= List of Interstate Intercollegiate Athletic Conference football standings =

This is a list of yearly Interstate Intercollegiate Athletic Conference football standings.

== Standings ==
1910 Illinois Intercollegiate Athletic Conference football standings
	Conf.					Overall
Team	W		L		T	W		L		T
Southern Illinois		–		–		7	–	1	–	0

1911 Illinois Intercollegiate Athletic Conference football standings
	Conf.					Overall
Team	W		L		T	W		L		T
Southern Illinois		–		–		3	–	4	–	0

1912 Illinois Intercollegiate Athletic Conference football standings
	Conf.					Overall
Team	W		L		T	W		L		T
Carthage	2	–	1	–	0	5	–	2	–	0
Southern Illinois			–			3	–	4	–	0

1913 Illinois Intercollegiate Athletic Conference football standings
	Conf.					Overall
Team	W		L		T	W		L		T
Southern Illinois			–			4	–	3	–	1
Carthage	1	–	2	–	0	3	–	3	–	1

1914 Illinois Intercollegiate Athletic Conference football standings
	Conf.					Overall
Team	W		L		T	W		L		T
Carthage	1	–	2	–	0	3	–	2	–	0
Southern Illinois			–			2	–	5	–	1

1915 Illinois Intercollegiate Athletic Conference football standings
	Conf.					Overall
Team	W		L		T	W		L		T
Southern Illinois			–			6	–	2	–	0
Carthage	2	–	3	–	0	3	–	4	–	0

1916 Illinois Intercollegiate Athletic Conference football standings
	Conf.					Overall
Team	W		L		T	W		L		T
Carthage	2	–	2	–	0	2	–	5	–	0
Southern Illinois			–			0	–	7	–	0

1917 Illinois Intercollegiate Athletic Conference football standings
	Conf.					Overall
Team	W		L		T	W		L		T
Carthage	3	–	0	–	0	4	–	1	–	1
Southern Illinois			–			3	–	2	–	3

1918 Illinois Intercollegiate Athletic Conference football standings
	Conf.					Overall
Team	W		L		T	W		L		T
Carthage	0	–	1	–	0	1	–	2	–	0

1919 Illinois Intercollegiate Athletic Conference football standings
	Conf.					Overall
Team	W		L		T	W		L		T
Carthage	3	–	2	–	0	5	–	3	–	0
Southern Illinois			–			4	–	3	–	1

1920 Illinois Intercollegiate Athletic Conference football standings
	Conf.					Overall
Team	W		L		T	W		L		T
Carthage	0	–	4	–	1	1	–	5	–	1

1921 Illinois Intercollegiate Athletic Conference football standings
	Conf.					Overall
Team	W		L		T	W		L		T
Carthage	4	–	2	–	0	6	–	2	–	0
Southern Illinois			–			4	–	3	–	2

1922 Illinois Intercollegiate Athletic Conference football standings
	Conf.					Overall
Team	W		L		T	W		L		T
Lombard +	3	–	0	–	0	7	–	0	–	2
Eastern Illinois	3	–	0	–	2	4	–	0	–	2
Shurtleff	4	–	1	–	1	4	–	1	–	1
Illinois Wesleyan	6	–	2	–	0	6	–	3	–	0
Northern Illinois State	3	–	1	–	1	5	–	4	–	1
Western Illinois	2	–	1	–	0	5	–	3	–	0
Eureka	4	–	3	–	0	5	–	3	–	0
Carthage	2	–	2	–	0	5	–	4	–	0
Lake Forest	0	–	0	–	1	4	–	3	–	2
McKendree	1	–	1	–	1	1	–	1	–	2
Mount Morris	1	–	1	–	0	3	–	3	–	0
Millikin	2	–	2	–	1	3	–	4	–	2
Monmouth (IL)	2	–	4	–	0	2	–	6	–	0
Knox (IL)	1	–	3	–	0	2	–	7	–	0
Illinois State Normal	1	–	3	–	3	1	–	4	–	3
Lincoln (IL)	1	–	3	–	0	1	–	5	–	0
Augustana (IL)	1	–	5	–	0	1	–	8	–	0
St. Viator	0	–	1	–	0	3	–	4	–	1
Wheaton (IL)	0	–	3	–	0	2	–	5	–	0
Southern Illinois	0	–	3	–	0	1	–	6	–	0
Illinois College	?	–	?	–	?	5	–	4	–	0
Blackburn	?	–	?	–	?	1	–	4	–	1
$ – Conference champion

1923 Illinois Intercollegiate Athletic Conference football standings
	Conf.					Overall
Team	W		L		T	W		L		T
Lombard $	4	–	0	–	0	6	–	1	–	0
Mount Morris	2	–	0	–	1	2	–	1	–	2
Knox (IL)	4	–	1	–	0	7	–	1	–	0
Illinois Wesleyan	7	–	2	–	0	7	–	2	–	0
Bradley	6	–	2	–	0	6	–	2	–	0
Southern Illinois	2	–	1	–	0	3	–	2	–	2
Lincoln (IL)	2	–	1	–	2	?	–	?	–	?
Eastern Illinois	3	–	2	–	2	4	–	2	–	2
Monmouth (IL)	4	–	3	–	1	6	–	3	–	1
Illinois College	3	–	3	–	1	3	–	4	–	1
Eureka	4	–	4	–	0	4	–	4	–	0
Millikin	4	–	4	–	0	4	–	5	–	0
Carthage	2	–	3	–	1	4	–	3	–	1
Illinois State Normal	2	–	3	–	2	2	–	4	–	2
Augustana (IL)	3	–	5	–	0	3	–	5	–	0
St. Viator	1	–	2	–	0	5	–	3	–	2
Lake Forest	1	–	3	–	0	2	–	6	–	1
Blackburn	1	–	4	–	1	1	–	5	–	1
Western Illinois	1	–	4	–	1	1	–	6	–	1
Wheaton (IL)	0	–	1	–	1	2	–	3	–	2
Northern Illinois State	0	–	2	–	3	1	–	4	–	3
Shurtleff	0	–	4	–	1	?	–	?	–	?
McKendree	0	–	4	–	0	1	–	5	–	1
$ – Conference champion

1924 Illinois Intercollegiate Athletic Conference football standings
	Conf.					Overall
Team	W		L		T	W		L		T
Lombard +	5	–	0	–	0	5	–	4	–	0
Knox (IL) +	4	–	0	–	0	7	–	1	–	0
Bradley	7	–	1	–	0	8	–	1	–	0
Eastern Illinois	5	–	2	–	0	6	–	2	–	0
McKendree *	4	–	2	–	0	4	–	4	–	0
Millikin	4	–	2	–	0	4	–	4	–	0
Monmouth (IL)	5	–	3	–	1	5	–	4	–	1
Shurtleff	3	–	2	–	0	3	–	3	–	0
Wheaton (IL)	3	–	2	–	0	4	–	3	–	0
Western Illinois	3	–	3	–	0	4	–	3	–	0
Illinois College	4	–	4	–	0	5	–	4	–	0
Illinois Wesleyan	4	–	4	–	0	4	–	4	–	0
Eureka	3	–	4	–	1	3	–	4	–	1
Carthage	2	–	3	–	1	3	–	4	–	1
Mount Morris	2	–	3	–	0	5	–	5	–	0
Illinois State Normal	2	–	4	–	2	2	–	4	–	2
Southern Illinois	1	–	2	–	0	6	–	2	–	0
St. Viator †	1	–	2	–	0	1	–	5	–	2
Northern Illinois State	1	–	3	–	0	4	–	4	–	0
Augustana (IL)	2	–	7	–	0	2	–	7	–	0
Lake Forest	1	–	4	–	0	1	–	6	–	0
Lincoln (IL)	1	–	5	–	1	2	–	5	–	1
Blackburn	0	–	4	–	0	1	–	7	–	0
$ – Conference champion; * – McKendree finished the season 5–0–1 in conference play, but forfeited a tie with Illinois College and a win over Eastern Illinois. † – St. Viator finished the season 2–1 in conference play, but forfeited a win over Illinois Wesleyan.

1925 Illinois Intercollegiate Athletic Conference football standings
	Conf.					Overall
Team	W		L		T	W		L		T
Bradley +	5	–	0	–	0	9	–	0	–	0
Monmouth (IL) +	6	–	0	–	1	7	–	0	–	2
Millikin	5	–	0	–	1	6	–	1	–	1
McKendree	5	–	1	–	0	5	–	3	–	1
Lake Forest	2	–	1	–	0	5	–	2	–	0
Knox (IL)	2	–	1	–	0	2	–	6	–	0
St. Viator	3	–	2	–	0	5	–	3	–	1
Carthage	3	–	2	–	1	4	–	4	–	1
Augustana (IL)	4	–	3	–	1	4	–	3	–	1
Western Illinois	4	–	3	–	1	4	–	3	–	1
Eureka	5	–	4	–	0	5	–	4	–	0
Hedding	1	–	1	–	0	2	–	2	–	1
Shurtleff	3	–	4	–	1	4	–	5	–	1
Eastern Illinois	1	–	2	–	0	4	–	3	–	1
Lincoln (IL)	2	–	4	–	1	2	–	5	–	1
Illinois College	2	–	4	–	3	2	–	5	–	3
Mount Morris	1	–	2	–	0	2	–	5	–	0
Wheaton (IL)	1	–	5	–	0	1	–	7	–	0
Illinois State Normal	1	–	6	–	0	1	–	6	–	0
Illinois Wesleyan	0	–	5	–	1	1	–	6	–	1
Southern Illinois	0	–	2	–	0	0	–	5	–	1
Blackburn	0	–	2	–	0	0	–	3	–	0
North-Western College	0	–	6	–	0	0	–	6	–	0
$ – Conference champion

1926 Illinois Intercollegiate Athletic Conference football standings
	Conf.					Overall
Team	W		L		T	W		L		T
Bradley +	5	–	0	–	0	9	–	0	–	0
Monmouth (IL) +	5	–	0	–	0	7	–	1	–	0
Lake Forest	1	–	0	–	0	2	–	3	–	3
Illinois College	6	–	2	–	0	6	–	2	–	0
Millikin	6	–	2	–	0	6	–	2	–	0
Shurtleff	6	–	2	–	0	6	–	2	–	0
Augustana (IL)	4	–	2	–	1	5	–	2	–	1
North Central	3	–	2	–	0	5	–	4	–	0
Western Illinois	4	–	3	–	0	4	–	3	–	1
Southern Illinois	1	–	1	–	1	5	–	1	–	2
Illinois State Normal	4	–	4	–	0	4	–	4	–	0
Illinois Wesleyan	3	–	3	–	0	3	–	3	–	1
Carthage	2	–	3	–	1	3	–	3	–	2
Eastern Illinois	2	–	3	–	0	3	–	5	–	1
St. Viator	1	–	2	–	0	3	–	5	–	0
Knox (IL)	1	–	3	–	1	2	–	5	–	1
McKendree	1	–	3	–	1	1	–	6	–	1
Lincoln (IL)	1	–	6	–	0	2	–	6	–	0
Wheaton (IL)	0	–	3	–	1	0	–	6	–	1
Mount Morris	0	–	5	–	1	0	–	6	–	1
Eureka	0	–	6	–	1	0	–	6	–	1
+ – Conference co-champions

1927 Illinois Intercollegiate Athletic Conference football standings
	Conf.					Overall
Team	W		L		T	W		L		T
Bradley $	6	–	1	–	0	6	–	3	–	0
Illinois Wesleyan	6	–	2	–	1	6	–	2	–	1
Eastern Illinois	3	–	1	–	0	5	–	2	–	0
Monmouth (IL)	3	–	1	–	0	4	–	4	–	0
Millikin	3	–	1	–	1	3	–	3	–	1
St. Viator	3	–	1	–	0	6	–	2	–	1
North Central	2	–	1	–	1	5	–	3	–	1
Southern Illinois	2	–	1	–	0	3	–	5	–	2
McKendree	3	–	2	–	1	6	–	2	–	2
Knox (IL)	3	–	2	–	0	4	–	4	–	0
Western Illinois	5	–	3	–	1	6	–	3	–	1
Lake Forest	0	–	0	–	1	3	–	2	–	3
Illinois State Normal	4	–	4	–	0	4	–	4	–	0
Illinois College	3	–	4	–	1	3	–	5	–	1
Mount Morris	2	–	3	–	0	5	–	3	–	0
Carthage	1	–	2	–	2	2	–	3	–	2
Shurtleff	1	–	2	–	2	4	–	3	–	1
Lincoln (IL)	2	–	6	–	0	3	–	6	–	0
Augustana (IL)	1	–	5	–	0	2	–	5	–	0
Wheaton (IL)	0	–	2	–	0	2	–	4	–	1
Eureka	0	–	9	–	0	0	–	9	–	0
$ – Conference champion

1928 Illinois Intercollegiate Athletic Conference football standings
	Conf.					Overall
Team	W		L		T	W		L		T
Eastern Illinois +	5	–	0	–	1	7	–	0	–	1
Millikin +	5	–	0	–	1	6	–	0	–	2
Augustana (IL)	6	–	1	–	0	7	–	1	–	0
Bradley	6	–	1	–	0	7	–	2	–	0
Monmouth (IL)	5	–	1	–	0	6	–	3	–	0
Southern Illinois	3	–	1	–	0	7	–	1	–	2
McKendree	2	–	1	–	0	5	–	5	–	0
Illinois Wesleyan	5	–	3	–	0	5	–	3	–	0
Carthage	2	–	2	–	1	2	–	3	–	2
Lake Forest	1	–	1	–	0	2	–	4	–	1
Illinois College	4	–	5	–	0	4	–	5	–	0
Eureka	3	–	4	–	1	3	–	4	–	1
North Central	2	–	3	–	1	4	–	3	–	2
Mount Morris	2	–	3	–	0	3	–	3	–	1
Western Illinois	2	–	3	–	2	2	–	3	–	3
St. Viator	1	–	3	–	0	3	–	5	–	0
Illinois State Normal	2	–	6	–	0	2	–	6	–	0
Knox (IL)	1	–	4	–	0	3	–	5	–	0
Wheaton (IL)	0	–	2	–	1	3	–	4	–	1
Northern Illinois State	0	–	2	–	1	0	–	6	–	1
Shurtleff	0	–	3	–	1	1	–	4	–	1
Lincoln (IL)	0	–	8	–	0	0	–	8	–	0
+ – Conference co-champions

1929 Illinois Intercollegiate Athletic Conference football standings
	Conf.					Overall
Team	W		L		T	W		L		T
Knox (IL) +	5	–	0	–	0	7	–	1	–	0
Lombard +	3	–	0	–	0	6	–	1	–	1
Millikin	5	–	1	–	0	7	–	1	–	0
Eastern Illinois	5	–	1	–	0	6	–	1	–	0
Monmouth (IL)	5	–	1	–	0	5	–	4	–	0
Northern Illinois State	4	–	1	–	1	6	–	1	–	1
Illinois Wesleyan	5	–	2	–	0	5	–	3	–	0
Elmhurst	2	–	1	–	0	8	–	1	–	0
Bradley	4	–	2	–	0	6	–	3	–	0
Southern Illinois	4	–	2	–	0	5	–	3	–	1
Shurtleff	3	–	2	–	0	5	–	3	–	0
Carthage	2	–	2	–	1	4	–	3	–	1
Eureka	3	–	3	–	2	3	–	3	–	2
Illinois College	3	–	3	–	0	4	–	4	–	0
Augustana (IL)	3	–	3	–	1	3	–	4	–	1
North Central *	2	–	4	–	1	3	–	5	–	1
Lake Forest	1	–	2	–	0	2	–	5	–	0
McKendree	1	–	4	–	0	4	–	6	–	0
Wheaton (IL)	1	–	4	–	1	2	–	6	–	1
Illinois State Normal	1	–	5	–	2	1	–	5	–	2
St. Viator	0	–	6	–	1	0	–	7	–	1
Mount Morris	0	–	6	–	0	2	–	6	–	0
Western Illinois †	0	–	7	–	0	0	–	8	–	0
+ – Conference co-champions; * – North Central finished the season 6–0–1 in conference play, but forfeited their share of the title and four wins, over Lake Forest, Augustana, Carthage, and Monmouth, because of an ineligible player. † – Western Illinois finished the season 3–4 in conference play, but forfeited three wins, over Shurtleff, Augustana, and Illinois State, because of an ineligible player.

1930 Illinois Intercollegiate Athletic Conference football standings
	Conf.					Overall
Team	W		L		T	W		L		T
Southern Illinois +	5	–	0	–	0	9	–	0	–	0
Millikin +	4	–	0	–	0	5	–	2	–	0
Mount Morris +	3	–	0	–	0	9	–	0	–	0
Eastern Illinois	5	–	1	–	1	6	–	1	–	1
Northern Illinois State	4	–	1	–	1	6	–	2	–	1
Knox (IL)	4	–	1	–	0	5	–	2	–	1
Monmouth (IL)	5	–	2	–	0	5	–	4	–	0
Lake Forest	2	–	1	–	0	5	–	1	–	1
Illinois Wesleyan	4	–	2	–	0	6	–	2	–	0
Elmhurst	3	–	2	–	0	6	–	2	–	0
Augustana (IL)	3	–	2	–	0	4	–	3	–	0
North Central	2	–	2	–	1	6	–	2	–	1
Bradley	2	–	2	–	1	4	–	3	–	1
Carthage	3	–	3	–	0	3	–	4	–	1
Western Illinois	3	–	4	–	0	4	–	4	–	0
Shurtleff	2	–	3	–	0	6	–	4	–	0
St. Viator	3	–	5	–	0	3	–	6	–	0
Eureka	2	–	6	–	0	2	–	6	–	0
Illinois State Normal	1	–	7	–	0	1	–	7	–	0
Wheaton (IL)	0	–	4	–	0	2	–	6	–	0
McKendree	0	–	5	–	0	3	–	6	–	0
Illinois College	0	–	7	–	0	0	–	8	–	0
+ – Conference co-champions

1931 Illinois Intercollegiate Athletic Conference football standings
	Conf.					Overall
Team	W		L		T	W		L		T
Monmouth (IL) $	5	–	0	–	1	9	–	0	–	1
Millikin	4	–	1	–	0	6	–	3	–	0
Bradley	4	–	1	–	0	5	–	3	–	0
Augustana (IL)	3	–	1	–	2	5	–	2	–	2
St. Viator	5	–	2	–	0	5	–	2	–	0
Southern Illinois	4	–	2	–	0	7	–	2	–	0
North Central	4	–	2	–	0	5	–	2	–	0
Northern Illinois State	4	–	2	–	0	5	–	3	–	0
Carthage	3	–	3	–	1	4	–	4	–	1
Elmhurst	3	–	3	–	0	4	–	4	–	0
Knox (IL)	2	–	2	–	1	3	–	5	–	1
Illinois Wesleyan	3	–	3	–	0	3	–	5	–	0
McKendree	2	–	3	–	1	4	–	4	–	1
Eastern Illinois	2	–	3	–	0	3	–	4	–	0
Mount Morris	1	–	2	–	1	4	–	4	–	1
Eureka	2	–	4	–	1	3	–	4	–	1
Shurtleff	2	–	4	–	1	3	–	4	–	1
Western Illinois	2	–	4	–	0	2	–	6	–	0
Illinois College	1	–	4	–	2	2	–	5	–	2
Illinois State Normal	1	–	6	–	1	1	–	6	–	1
Lake Forest	0	–	2	–	2	0	–	2	–	4
Wheaton (IL)	0	–	3	–	0	3	–	5	–	0
$ – Conference champion

1932 Illinois Intercollegiate Athletic Conference football standings
	Conf.					Overall
Team	W		L		T	W		L		T
Illinois Wesleyan +	6	–	0	–	0	6	–	2	–	0
McKendree +	5	–	0	–	0	9	–	1	–	0
Augustana (IL)	5	–	0	–	1	6	–	0	–	2
Illinois State Normal	6	–	2	–	0	7	–	2	–	0
Bradley	3	–	1	–	1	3	–	3	–	2
Western Illinois	4	–	2	–	1	4	–	2	–	1
St. Viator	2	–	1	–	0	3	–	4	–	1
Shurtleff	5	–	3	–	0	6	–	3	–	0
Millikin	3	–	2	–	0	5	–	2	–	1
Illinois College	3	–	3	–	0	3	–	4	–	0
Northern Illinois State	2	–	2	–	1	4	–	2	–	1
Monmouth (IL)	2	–	2	–	1	4	–	3	–	2
Lake Forest	2	–	2	–	0	4	–	3	–	1
North Central	2	–	4	–	0	4	–	5	–	0
Eureka	1	–	3	–	1	1	–	4	–	1
Wheaton (IL)	1	–	3	–	0	4	–	3	–	0
Southern Illinois	1	–	4	–	1	2	–	5	–	3
Carthage	0	–	4	–	3	1	–	4	–	4
Knox (IL)	0	–	4	–	0	0	–	8	–	0
Elmhurst	0	–	5	–	0	0	–	6	–	0
Eastern Illinois	0	–	6	–	0	1	–	7	–	0
+ – Conference co-champions

1933 Illinois Intercollegiate Athletic Conference football standings
	Conf.					Overall
Team	W		L		T	W		L		T
Illinois Wesleyan $	4	–	0	–	1	6	–	2	–	1
North Central	2	–	0	–	2	4	–	0	–	2
St. Viator	2	–	0	–	0	3	–	4	–	0
Millikin	1	–	0	–	2	3	–	1	–	2
McKendree	4	–	1	–	0	6	–	3	–	0
Augustana (IL)	4	–	1	–	1	7	–	1	–	1
Illinois College	4	–	1	–	1	4	–	2	–	1
Carthage	3	–	1	–	1	4	–	1	–	2
Illinois State Normal	5	–	2	–	0	6	–	3	–	0
Southern Illinois	4	–	2	–	0	4	–	4	–	1
Lake Forest	2	–	1	–	0	3	–	3	–	1
Bradley	3	–	2	–	1	3	–	5	–	2
Northern Illinois State	4	–	3	–	0	5	–	4	–	0
Monmouth (IL)	2	–	3	–	0	4	–	5	–	0
Western Illinois	2	–	4	–	0	3	–	5	–	0
Wheaton (IL)	1	–	2	–	2	2	–	2	–	3
Eastern Illinois	1	–	5	–	0	1	–	8	–	0
Elmhurst	0	–	3	–	1	0	–	5	–	1
Shurtleff	0	–	5	–	0	0	–	7	–	1
Knox (IL)	0	–	5	–	0	0	–	8	–	0
Eureka	0	–	7	–	0	0	–	7	–	0
$ – Conference champion

1934 Illinois Intercollegiate Athletic Conference football standings
	Conf.					Overall
Team	W		L		T	W		L		T
Augustana (IL) +	6	–	0	–	0	9	–	0	–	0
Millikin +	5	–	0	–	1	7	–	0	–	1
Southern Illinois	5	–	1	–	0	5	–	3	–	0
Illinois College	5	–	1	–	0	6	–	1	–	0
Northern Illinois State	4	–	1	–	2	5	–	1	–	2
Illinois Wesleyan	3	–	1	–	2	4	–	2	–	3
Western Illinois	4	–	2	–	0	5	–	3	–	0
Bradley	3	–	2	–	0	5	–	3	–	0
North Central	3	–	2	–	0	5	–	2	–	0
Elmhurst	2	–	2	–	0	4	–	2	–	1
Monmouth (IL)	2	–	2	–	0	6	–	2	–	1
Illinois State Normal	2	–	3	–	2	2	–	4	–	2
McKendree	1	–	4	–	0	4	–	5	–	0
Eastern Illinois	1	–	4	–	0	3	–	4	–	0
Carthage	1	–	4	–	0	2	–	6	–	0
Eureka	0	–	3	–	2	0	–	3	–	2
St. Viator	0	–	3	–	0	2	–	6	–	0
Wheaton (IL)	0	–	4	–	1	1	–	5	–	1
Knox (IL)	0	–	5	–	0	0	–	8	–	0
Lake Forest	0	–	4	–	0	3	–	4	–	1
+ – Conference co-champions

1935 Illinois Intercollegiate Athletic Conference football standings
	Conf.					Overall
Team	W		L		T	W		L		T
Millikin +	4	–	0	–	0	5	–	1	–	0
Monmouth (IL) +	4	–	0	–	0	6	–	3	–	0
Northern Illinois State	5	–	1	–	1	7	–	1	–	1
Illinois College	5	–	1	–	0	5	–	3	–	0
McKendree	4	–	1	–	1	5	–	3	–	1
Illinois Wesleyan	4	–	1	–	0	7	–	3	–	0
Illinois State Normal	4	–	2	–	1	5	–	2	–	2
Elmhurst	2	–	1	–	1	5	–	2	–	1
Knox (IL)	2	–	1	–	1	5	–	2	–	2
Augustana (IL)	3	–	2	–	0	5	–	3	–	0
North Central	3	–	3	–	0	4	–	3	–	0
Carthage	2	–	3	–	0	4	–	4	–	0
Wheaton (IL)	1	–	2	–	1	2	–	5	–	1
St. Viator	1	–	2	–	0	2	–	4	–	2
Southern Illinois	1	–	4	–	1	1	–	7	–	1
Bradley	1	–	5	–	1	1	–	6	–	1
Western Illinois	1	–	6	–	0	2	–	6	–	0
Lake Forest	0	–	1	–	0	3	–	4	–	0
Eastern Illinois	0	–	5	–	0	1	–	7	–	0
Eureka	0	–	6	–	0	0	–	6	–	0
+ – Conference co-champions

1936 Illinois Intercollegiate Athletic Conference football standings
	Conf.					Overall
Team	W		L		T	W		L		T
Illinois Wesleyan +	5	–	0	–	1	5	–	3	–	1
St. Viator +	3	–	0	–	0	5	–	2	–	0
Bradley	6	–	2	–	0	6	–	3	–	0
North Central	3	–	1	–	1	4	–	2	–	1
Lake Forest	2	–	1	–	0	4	–	2	–	1
Wheaton (IL)	2	–	1	–	2	3	–	2	–	2
Southern Illinois	3	–	2	–	1	2	–	7	–	0
Western Illinois	3	–	2	–	1	3	–	2	–	2
Northern Illinois State	3	–	2	–	1	4	–	3	–	1
Illinois College	2	–	2	–	1	4	–	3	–	1
Monmouth (IL)	2	–	2	–	0	4	–	4	–	0
Augustana (IL)	3	–	3	–	0	3	–	5	–	0
Illinois State Normal	2	–	3	–	1	3	–	4	–	2
Millikin	2	–	4	–	0	3	–	5	–	0
Eastern Illinois	2	–	4	–	0	4	–	4	–	0
Knox (IL)	1	–	2	–	0	3	–	5	–	0
Eureka	2	–	5	–	1	2	–	5	–	1
Elmhurst	1	–	3	–	1	3	–	3	–	1
Carthage	1	–	4	–	1	2	–	5	–	1
Shurtleff	0	–	1	–	0	0	–	4	–	0
McKendree	0	–	4	–	0	2	–	6	–	0
+ – Conference co-champions

1937 Illinois Intercollegiate Athletic Conference football standings
	Conf.					Overall
Team	W		L		T	W		L		T
Illinois College +	5	–	0	–	0	7	–	2	–	0
Bradley +	5	–	0	–	0	6	–	3	–	0
Illinois State Normal +	4	–	0	–	2	5	–	1	–	2
St. Viator	2	–	0	–	1	6	–	2	–	1
Monmouth (IL)	1	–	0	–	3	4	–	1	–	4
Augustana (IL)	4	–	1	–	1	5	–	2	–	1
Western Illinois	3	–	1	–	1	3	–	4	–	1
Knox (IL)	2	–	1	–	1	3	–	4	–	1
Illinois Wesleyan	3	–	2	–	1	5	–	3	–	1
Northern Illinois State	3	–	2	–	1	3	–	2	–	3
Lake Forest	1	–	1	–	1	3	–	1	–	2
Wheaton (IL)	3	–	3	–	0	3	–	5	–	0
Shurtleff	1	–	1	–	0	1	–	5	–	0
Elmhurst	2	–	3	–	1	3	–	3	–	2
McKendree	2	–	3	–	1	3	–	5	–	1
Southern Illinois	2	–	4	–	0	2	–	7	–	0
North Central	1	–	2	–	3	1	–	3	–	3
Eastern Illinois	1	–	4	–	1	3	–	4	–	1
Carthage	1	–	5	–	0	1	–	6	–	0
Eureka	0	–	6	–	0	0	–	6	–	0
Millikin	0	–	7	–	0	0	–	9	–	0
+ – Conference co-champions

1938 Illinois Intercollegiate Athletic Conference football standings
	Conf.					Overall
Team	W		L		T	W		L		T
Northern Illinois State $	4	–	0	–	0	6	–	1	–	1
Carthage	3	–	0	–	0	6	–	1	–	1
Illinois State Normal	4	–	1	–	0	5	–	4	–	1
Western Illinois	2	–	2	–	0	4	–	3	–	1
Eastern Illinois	1	–	3	–	0	5	–	3	–	0
Elmhurst	1	–	3	–	0	2	–	5	–	0
Eureka	0	–	2	–	0	1	–	6	–	0
Southern Illinois	0	–	4	–	0	2	–	7	–	0

1939 Illinois Intercollegiate Athletic Conference football standings
	Conf.					Overall
Team	W		L		T	W		L		T
Western Illinois $	3	–	0	–	1	5	–	1	–	1
Illinois State Normal	3	–	0	–	2	4	–	2	–	3
Northern Illinois State	3	–	1	–	0	5	–	2	–	1
Carthage	2	–	1	–	0	2	–	6	–	1
Eastern Illinois	2	–	2	–	1	4	–	3	–	1
Elmhurst	1	–	4	–	0	1	–	6	–	1
Eureka	0	–	2	–	0	0	–	7	–	0
Southern Illinois	0	–	4	–	0	0	–	8	–	0
$ – Conference champion

1940 Illinois Intercollegiate Athletic Conference football standings
	Conf.					Overall
Team	W		L		T	W		L		T
Illinois State Normal $	4	–	0	–	0	5	–	3	–	1
Carthage	2	–	0	–	0	5	–	2	–	1
Eastern Illinois	4	–	1	–	0	6	–	1	–	1
Northern Illinois State	2	–	2	–	0	6	–	3	–	0
Elmhurst	1	–	2	–	0	2	–	5	–	1
Western Illinois	0	–	3	–	1	1	–	6	–	1
Southern Illinois	0	–	3	–	1	2	–	5	–	1
Eureka	0	–	2	–	0	2	–	5	–	1

1941 Illinois Intercollegiate Athletic Conference football standings
	Conf.					Overall
Team	W		L		T	W		L		T
Northern Illinois State +	3	–	1	–	0	7	–	1	–	1
Illinois State Normal +	3	–	1	–	0	3	–	4	–	2
Southern Illinois	2	–	1	–	1	5	–	2	–	1
Western Illinois	1	–	2	–	1	3	–	4	–	1
Eastern Illinois	0	–	4	–	0	0	–	7	–	0
Eureka	0	–	0	–	0	3	–	3	–	1
+ – Conference co-champions

1942 Illinois Intercollegiate Athletic Conference football standings
	Conf.					Overall
Team	W		L		T	W		L		T
Western Illinois $	3	–	0	–	1	5	–	0	–	2
Northern Illinois State	1	–	0	–	2	3	–	2	–	2
Illinois State Normal	2	–	1	–	1	2	–	5	–	1
Southern Illinois	1	–	3	–	0	2	–	4	–	0
Eastern Illinois	0	–	3	–	0	1	–	6	–	0
$ – Conference champion

1943 Illinois Intercollegiate Athletic Conference football standings
	Conf.					Overall
Team	W		L		T	W		L		T
Northern Illinois State	1	–	0	–	0	4	–	1	–	1
Illinois State Normal	1	–	0	–	0	6	–	2	–	1
Western Illinois	0	–	2	–	0	1	–	6	–	0
Eastern Illinois	0	–	0	–	0	0	–	0	–	0
Southern Illinois	0	–	0	–	0	0	–	0	–	0

1944 Illinois Intercollegiate Athletic Conference football standings
	Conf.					Overall
Team	W		L		T	W		L		T
Northern Illinois State $	3	–	0	–	0	7	–	0	–	0
Illinois State Normal	1	–	0	–	0	3	–	4	–	1
Southern Illinois	2	–	1	–	0	3	–	3	–	0
Eastern Illinois	1	–	2	–	0	1	–	3	–	0
Western Illinois	0	–	4	–	0	0	–	8	–	0
$ – Conference champion

1945 Illinois Intercollegiate Athletic Conference football standings
	Conf.					Overall
Team	W		L		T	W		L		T
Illinois State Normal $	3	–	1	–	0	4	–	3	–	0
Southern Illinois	2	–	1	–	1	4	–	1	–	2
Northern Illinois State	2	–	2	–	0	4	–	3	–	0
Eastern Illinois	1	–	1	–	2	2	–	3	–	2
Western Illinois	0	–	3	–	1	1	–	5	–	1
$ – Conference champion

1946 Illinois Intercollegiate Athletic Conference football standings
	Conf.					Overall
Team	W		L		T	W		L		T
Northern Illinois State $	4	–	0	–	0	9	–	2	–	0
Southern Illinois	3	–	1	–	0	4	–	4	–	0
Illinois State Normal	2	–	2	–	0	6	–	3	–	0
Eastern Illinois	1	–	3	–	0	2	–	6	–	0
Western Illinois	0	–	4	–	0	2	–	6	–	0
$ – Conference champion

1947 Illinois Intercollegiate Athletic Conference football standings
	Conf.					Overall
Team	W		L		T	W		L		T
Southern Illinois $	3	–	0	–	1	7	–	2	–	1
Northern Illinois State	2	–	1	–	1	4	–	3	–	3
Illinois State Normal	1	–	1	–	2	4	–	3	–	2
Eastern Illinois	2	–	2	–	0	2	–	6	–	0
Western Illinois	0	–	4	–	0	4	–	4	–	1
$ – Conference champion

1948 Illinois Intercollegiate Athletic Conference football standings
	Conf.					Overall
Team	W		L		T	W		L		T
Eastern Illinois $	4	–	0	–	0	7	–	3	–	0
Illinois State Normal	3	–	1	–	0	7	–	2	–	0
Northern Illinois State	2	–	2	–	0	6	–	4	–	0
Western Illinois	1	–	3	–	0	4	–	4	–	0
Southern Illinois	0	–	4	–	0	2	–	6	–	0
$ – Conference champion

1949 Illinois Intercollegiate Athletic Conference football standings
	Conf.					Overall
Team	W		L		T	W		L		T
Western Illinois $	4	–	0	–	0	9	–	1	–	0
Northern Illinois State	2	–	1	–	1	7	–	2	–	1
Eastern Illinois	2	–	2	–	0	3	–	5	–	0
Illinois State Normal	1	–	2	–	1	6	–	2	–	1
Southern Illinois	0	–	4	–	0	2	–	7	–	0
$ – Conference champion

1950 Interstate Intercollegiate Athletic Conference football standings
	Conf.					Overall
Team	W		L		T	W		L		T
Illinois State Normal $	5	–	0	–	1	7	–	1	–	2
Western Illinois	4	–	1	–	0	7	–	1	–	0
Central Michigan	2	–	2	–	0	6	–	4	–	0
Eastern Illinois	2	–	2	–	0	5	–	3	–	0
Northern Illinois State	2	–	4	–	0	3	–	6	–	0
Southern Illinois	1	–	3	–	1	3	–	5	–	1
Michigan State Normal	0	–	4	–	0	3	–	6	–	0
$ – Conference champion

1951 Interstate Intercollegiate Athletic Conference football standings
	Conf.					Overall
Team	W		L		T	W		L		T
Northern Illinois State	6	–	0	–	0	9	–	0	–	0
Western Illinois	4	–	1	–	1	7	–	1	–	1
Central Michigan	4	–	2	–	0	5	–	3	–	0
Eastern Illinois	2	–	2	–	2	4	–	2	–	2
Michigan State Normal	2	–	4	–	0	4	–	5	–	0
Illinois State Normal	1	–	4	–	1	3	–	5	–	1
Southern Illinois	0	–	6	–	0	0	–	9	–	0
$ – Conference champion

1952 Interstate Intercollegiate Athletic Conference football standings
	Conf.					Overall
Team	W		L		T	W		L		T
Central Michigan $	6	–	0	–	0	7	–	2	–	0
Western Illinois	5	–	1	–	0	7	–	2	–	0
Michigan State Normal	3	–	2	–	1	5	–	3	–	1
Northern Illinois State	2	–	4	–	0	3	–	6	–	0
Southern Illinois	2	–	4	–	0	2	–	6	–	0
Illinois State Normal	1	–	4	–	1	1	–	6	–	2
Eastern Illinois	1	–	5	–	0	2	–	7	–	0
$ – Conference champion

1953 Interstate Intercollegiate Athletic Conference football standings
	Conf.					Overall
Team	W		L		T	W		L		T
Central Michigan $	5	–	0	–	1	7	–	1	–	1
Western Illinois	5	–	1	–	0	8	–	2	–	0
Michigan State Normal	4	–	1	–	1	7	–	1	–	1
Illinois State Normal	3	–	3	–	0	5	–	4	–	0
Southern Illinois	2	–	4	–	0	2	–	7	–	0
Northern Illinois State	1	–	5	–	0	1	–	8	–	0
Eastern Illinois	0	–	6	–	0	1	–	8	–	0
$ – Conference champion

1954 Interstate Intercollegiate Athletic Conference football standings
	Conf.					Overall
Team	W		L		T	W		L		T
Michigan State Normal +	5	–	1	–	0	8	–	1	–	0
Central Michigan +	5	–	1	–	0	8	–	2	–	0
Western Illinois	3	–	1	–	2	6	–	1	–	3
Illinois State Normal	3	–	2	–	1	5	–	3	–	1
Eastern Illinois	1	–	4	–	1	2	–	6	–	1
Southern Illinois	1	–	5	–	0	2	–	7	–	0
Northern Illinois State	1	–	5	–	0	2	–	7	–	0
+ – Conference co-champions

1955 Interstate Intercollegiate Athletic Conference football standings
	Conf.					Overall
Team	W		L		T	W		L		T
Central Michigan +	5	–	1	–	0	8	–	1	–	0
Michigan State Normal +	5	–	1	–	0	7	–	2	–	0
Southern Illinois	4	–	1	–	1	4	–	4	–	2
Western Illinois	2	–	3	–	1	5	–	4	–	1
Illinois State Normal	2	–	3	–	1	3	–	4	–	2
Eastern Illinois	1	–	5	–	0	3	–	6	–	0
Northern Illinois State	0	–	5	–	1	0	–	8	–	1
+ – Conference co-champions

1956 Interstate Intercollegiate Athletic Conference football standings
	Conf.					Overall
Team	W		L		T	W		L		T
Central Michigan $	6	–	0	–	0	9	–	0	–	0
Western Illinois	4	–	2	–	0	6	–	3	–	0
Eastern Michigan	3	–	3	–	0	4	–	4	–	0
Illinois State Normal	3	–	3	–	0	4	–	4	–	1
Southern Illinois	3	–	3	–	0	4	–	5	–	0
Eastern Illinois	2	–	4	–	0	2	–	7	–	0
Northern Illinois State	0	–	6	–	0	1	–	8	–	0
$ – Conference champion

1957 Interstate Intercollegiate Athletic Conference football standings
	Conf.					Overall
Team	W		L		T	W		L		T
Eastern Michigan $	6	–	0	–	0	6	–	3	–	0
Western Illinois	4	–	2	–	0	5	–	4	–	0
Central Michigan	4	–	2	–	0	4	–	6	–	0
Illinois State Normal	3	–	3	–	0	5	–	3	–	0
Southern Illinois	3	–	3	–	0	5	–	4	–	0
Northern Illinois	1	–	5	–	0	2	–	7	–	0
Eastern Illinois	0	–	6	–	0	0	–	8	–	0
$ – Conference champion

1958 Interstate Intercollegiate Athletic Conference football standings
	Conf.					Overall
Team	W		L		T	W		L		T
Western Illinois $	5	–	1	–	0	6	–	1	–	1
Southern Illinois	4	–	2	–	0	7	–	2	–	0
Central Michigan	4	–	2	–	0	7	–	3	–	0
Eastern Michigan	3	–	3	–	0	4	–	5	–	0
Northern Illinois	2	–	4	–	0	4	–	5	–	0
Illinois State Normal	2	–	4	–	0	3	–	6	–	0
Eastern Illinois	1	–	5	–	0	2	–	6	–	0
$ – Conference champion

1959 Interstate Intercollegiate Athletic Conference football standings
	Conf.					Overall
Team	W		L		T	W		L		T
No. 2 Western Illinois $	6	–	0	–	0	9	–	0	–	0
No. 17 Northern Illinois State	4	–	2	–	0	7	–	2	–	0
Central Michigan	4	–	2	–	0	7	–	3	–	0
Southern Illinois	4	–	2	–	0	5	–	4	–	0
Eastern Illinois	1	–	4	–	1	3	–	5	–	1
Eastern Michigan	1	–	5	–	0	1	–	7	–	0
Illinois State Normal	0	–	5	–	1	3	–	5	–	1
$ – Conference champion; Rankings from NAIA poll

1960 Interstate Intercollegiate Athletic Conference football standings
	Conf.					Overall
Team	W		L		T	W		L		T
No. 13 Southern Illinois $	6	–	0	–	0	8	–	2	–	0
Western Illinois	5	–	1	–	0	6	–	2	–	0
Northern Illinois	4	–	2	–	0	7	–	2	–	0
Central Michigan	3	–	3	–	0	3	–	5	–	0
Illinois State Normal	1	–	4	–	1	2	–	6	–	1
Eastern Illinois	1	–	5	–	0	2	–	7	–	0
Eastern Michigan	0	–	5	–	1	0	–	8	–	1
$ – Conference champion; Rankings from NAIA poll

1961 Interstate Intercollegiate Athletic Conference football standings
	Conf.					Overall
Team	W		L		T	W		L		T
Southern Illinois $	5	–	1	–	0	7	–	3	–	0
Western Illinois	4	–	2	–	0	5	–	3	–	0
Illinois State Normal	4	–	2	–	0	5	–	4	–	0
Eastern Illinois	3	–	2	–	1	4	–	3	–	1
Northern Illinois	3	–	2	–	1	4	–	4	–	1
Central Michigan	1	–	5	–	0	2	–	8	–	0
Eastern Michigan	0	–	6	–	0	0	–	8	–	1
$ – Conference champion

1962 Interstate Intercollegiate Athletic Conference football standings
	Conf.					Overall
Team	W		L		T	W		L		T
Central Michigan $	4	–	0	–	0	6	–	4	–	0
No. 9 Northern Illinois	3	–	1	–	0	8	–	2	–	0
Western Illinois	2	–	2	–	0	5	–	3	–	0
Illinois State Normal	1	–	3	–	0	5	–	4	–	0
Eastern Illinois	0	–	4	–	0	1	–	7	–	0
$ – Conference champion; Rankings from NAIA poll

1963 Interstate Intercollegiate Athletic Conference football standings
	Conf.					Overall
Team	W		L		T	W		L		T
No. 1 Northern Illinois $	4	–	0	–	0	10	–	0	–	0
Western Illinois	3	–	1	–	0	6	–	3	–	0
Central Michigan	2	–	2	–	0	4	–	5	–	1
Eastern Illinois	1	–	3	–	0	2	–	7	–	0
Illinois State Normal	0	–	4	–	0	3	–	6	–	0
$ – Conference champion; Rankings from NAIA poll

1964 Interstate Intercollegiate Athletic Conference football standings
	Conf.					Overall
Team	W		L		T	W		L		T
Northern Illinois +	3	–	1	–	0	7	–	2	–	0
Western Illinois +	3	–	1	–	0	6	–	3	–	0
Illinois State	2	–	2	–	0	5	–	4	–	0
Central Michigan	1	–	3	–	0	4	–	5	–	0
Eastern Illinois	1	–	3	–	0	3	–	6	–	0
+ – Conference co-champions

1965 Interstate Intercollegiate Athletic Conference football standings
	Conf.					Overall
Team	W		L		T	W		L		T
Northern Illinois $	4	–	0	–	0	9	–	1	–	0
Central Michigan	3	–	1	–	0	5	–	5	–	0
Western Illinois	2	–	2	–	0	4	–	5	–	0
Eastern Illinois	1	–	3	–	0	3	–	5	–	0
Illinois State	0	–	4	–	0	0	–	9	–	0
$ – Conference champion

1966 Interstate Intercollegiate Athletic Conference football standings
	Conf.					Overall
Team	W		L		T	W		L		T
Central Michigan $	3	–	0	–	0	5	–	5	–	0
Eastern Illinois	1	–	1	–	1	1	–	6	–	1
Western Illinois	1	–	2	–	0	1	–	7	–	1
Illinois State	0	–	2	–	1	2	–	5	–	2
$ – Conference champion

1967 Interstate Intercollegiate Athletic Conference football standings
	Conf.					Overall
Team	W		L		T	W		L		T
Central Michigan +	2	–	1	–	0	8	–	2	–	0
Illinois State +	2	–	1	–	0	8	–	2	–	0
Eastern Illinois	1	–	2	–	0	2	–	6	–	1
Western Illinois	1	–	2	–	0	2	–	6	–	0
+ – Conference co-champions

1968 Interstate Intercollegiate Athletic Conference football standings
	Conf.					Overall
Team	W		L		T	W		L		T
Central Michigan +	2	–	1	–	0	7	–	2	–	0
Illinois State +	2	–	1	–	0	6	–	4	–	0
Eastern Illinois	1	–	2	–	0	4	–	5	–	0
Western Illinois	1	–	2	–	0	2	–	7	–	1
+ – Conference co-champions

1969 Interstate Intercollegiate Athletic Conference football standings
	Conf.					Overall
Team	W		L		T	W		L		T
Western Illinois $	3	–	0	–	0	8	–	2	–	0
Central Michigan	2	–	1	–	0	7	–	3	–	0
Illinois State	1	–	2	–	0	5	–	6	–	0
Eastern Illinois	0	–	3	–	0	2	–	7	–	0
$ – Conference champion
