= List of Northern Illinois Huskies football seasons =

The following is a list of Northern Illinois Huskies football seasons for the football team that has represented Northern Illinois University in NCAA competition.

== Seasons ==
| Year | Coach | Overall | Conference | Standing | Bowl/playoffs | Coaches^{#} | AP^{°} |
|---|---|---|---|---|---|---|---|
John A. H. Keith (Independent) (1899–1903)
| 1899 | John A. H. Keith | 1–0–2 | | | | | |
| 1900 | John A. H. Keith | 2–2–2 | | | | | |
| 1901 | John A. H. Keith | 6–1 | | | | | |
| 1902 | John A. H. Keith | 5–1–1 | | | | | |
| 1903 | John A. H. Keith | 3–3 | | | | | |
| John A. H. Keith: | | 17–7–5 | | | | | |
Dixie Fleager (Independent) (1904)
| 1904 | Dixie Fleager | 5–0 | | | | | |
| Dixie Fleager: | | 5–0 | | | | | |
Harry Sauthoff (Independent) (1905)
| 1905 | Harry Sauthoff | 3–1–1 | | | | | |
| Harry Sauthoff: | | 3–1–1 | | | | | |
Nelson A. Kellogg (Independent) (1906–1909)
| 1906 | Nelson A. Kellogg | 4–2–1 | | | | | |
| 1907 | Nelson A. Kellogg | 1–4–1 | | | | | |
| 1908 | Nelson A. Kellogg | 1–5–1 | | | | | |
| 1909 | Nelson A. Kellogg | 2–6 | | | | | |
| Nelson A. Kellogg: | | 8–17–3 | | | | | |
William Wirtz (Independent) (1910–1916)
| 1910 | William Wirtz | 4–2–1 | | | | | |
| 1911 | William Wirtz | 8–1–2 | | | | | |
| 1912 | William Wirtz | 3–5 | | | | | |
| 1913 | William Wirtz | 3–3–3 | | | | | |
| 1914 | William Wirtz | 7–0–1 | | | | | |
| 1915 | William Wirtz | 2–5–1 | | | | | |
| 1916 | William Wirtz | 6–1–1 | | | | | |
| William Wirtz: | | 33–17–9 | | | | | |
| 1917–19 | No team – WWI | | | | | | |
Paul Harrison (Independent) (1920–1921)
| 1920 | Paul Harrison | 3–5 | | | | | |
| 1921 | Paul Harrison | 3–5 | | | | | |
Paul Harrison (Illinois Intercollegiate Athletic Conference) (1922)
| 1922 | Paul Harrison | 5–4–1 | 3–1–1 | | | | |
| Paul Harrison: | | 11–14–1 | 3–1–1 | | | | |
William Muir (Illinois Intercollegiate Athletic Conference) (1923–1924)
| 1923 | William Muir | 1–4–3 | 0–2–3 | T–20th | | | |
| 1924 | William Muir | 4–4 | 1–3 | 19th | | | |
William Muir (Independent) (1925)
| 1925 | William Muir | 6–1 | | | | | |
| William Muir: | | 11–9–3 | 1–5–3 | | | | |
Roland Cowell (Independent) (1926–1927)
| 1926 | Roland Cowell | 5–1–1 | | | | | |
| 1927 | Roland Cowell | 1–4–1 | | | | | |
Roland Cowell (Illinois Intercollegiate Athletic Conference) (1928)
| 1928 | Roland Cowell | 0–6–1 | 0–2–1 | T–19th | | | |
| Roland Cowell: | | 6–11–3 | 0–2–1 | | | | |
Chick Evans (Illinois/Interstate Intercollegiate Athletic Conference) (1929–1954)
| 1929 | Chick Evans | 6–1–1 | 4–1–1 | T–6th | | | |
| 1930 | Chick Evans | 6–2–1 | 4–1–1 | T–5th | | | |
| 1931 | Chick Evans | 5–3 | 4–2 | T–6th | | | |
| 1932 | Chick Evans | 4–2–1 | 2–2–1 | T–10th | | | |
| 1933 | Chick Evans | 5–4 | 4–3 | 13th | | | |
| 1934 | Chick Evans | 5–1–2 | 4–1–2 | 5th | | | |
| 1935 | Chick Evans | 7–1–1 | 5–1–1 | T–3rd | | | |
| 1936 | Chick Evans | 4–3–1 | 3–2–1 | T–7th | | | |
| 1937 | Chick Evans | 3–2–3 | 3–2–1 | T–9th | | | |
| 1938 | Chick Evans | 6–1–1 | 4–0 | 1st | | | |
| 1939 | Chick Evans | 5–2–1 | 3–1 | 3rd | | | |
| 1940 | Chick Evans | 6–3 | 2–2 | 4th | | | |
| 1941 | Chick Evans | 7–1–1 | 3–1 | T–1st | | | |
| 1942 | Chick Evans | 4–2–2 | 2–0–2 | 2nd | | | |
| 1943 | Chick Evans | 4–1–1 | 1–0 | | | | |
| 1944 | Chick Evans | 7–0 | 3–0 | 1st | | | |
| 1945 | Chick Evans | 4–3 | 2–2 | 3rd | | | |
| 1946 | Chick Evans | 9–2 | 4–0 | 1st | L Turkey | | |
| 1947 | Chick Evans | 4–3–3 | 2–1–1 | 2nd | L Hoosier | | |
| 1948 | Chick Evans | 6–4 | 2–2 | 3rd | | | |
| 1949 | Chick Evans | 7–2–1 | 2–1–1 | 2nd | | | |
| 1950 | Chick Evans | 3–6 | 2–4 | 5th | | | |
| 1951 | Chick Evans | 9–0 | 6–0 | 1st | | | |
| 1952 | Chick Evans | 3–6 | 2–4 | T–4th | | | |
| 1953 | Chick Evans | 1–8 | 1–5 | 6th | | | |
| 1954 | Chick Evans | 2–7 | 1–5 | T–6th | | | |
| Chick Evans: | | 132–70–20 | 75–43–12 | | | | |
Bob Kahler (Interstate Intercollegiate Athletic Conference) (1955)
| 1955 | Bob Kahler | 0–8–1 | 0–5–1 | T–6th | | | |
| Bob Kahler: | | 0–8–1 | 0–5–1 | | | | |
Howard Fletcher (Interstate Intercollegiate Athletic Conference) (1956–1965)
| 1956 | Howard Fletcher | 1–8 | 0–6 | 7th | | | |
| 1957 | Howard Fletcher | 2–7 | 1–5 | 6th | | | |
| 1958 | Howard Fletcher | 4–5 | 2–4 | T–5th | | | |
| 1959 | Howard Fletcher | 7–2 | 4–2 | 2nd | | | |
| 1960 | Howard Fletcher | 7–2 | 4–2 | 3rd | | | |
| 1961 | Howard Fletcher | 4–4–1 | 3–2–1 | T–4th | | | |
| 1962 | Howard Fletcher | 8–2 | 3–1 | 2nd | L Mineral Water | | |
| 1963 (Note: AP small college national champion) | Howard Fletcher | 10–0 | 4–0 | 1st | W Mineral Water | 2 (Note: Rankings from UPI coaches small college poll) | 1 (Note: Rankings from AP small college poll) |
| 1964 | Howard Fletcher | 7–2 | 3–1 | T–1st | | | |
| 1965 | Howard Fletcher | 9–1 | 4–0 | 1st | L Mineral Water | 7 (Note: Rankings from UPI coaches small college poll) | 6 (Note: Rankings from AP small college poll) |
Howard Fletcher (NCAA College Division independent) (1966–1968)
| 1966 | Howard Fletcher | 8–2 | | | | | |
| 1967 | Howard Fletcher | 5–5 | | | | | |
| 1968 | Howard Fletcher | 2–8 | | | | | |
| Howard Fletcher: | | 74–48–1 | 28–21–1 | | | | |
Doc Urich (NCAA University Division independent) (1969–1970)
| 1969 | Doc Urich | 3–7 | | | | | |
| 1970 | Doc Urich | 3–7 | | | | | |
| Doc Urich: | | 6–14 | | | | | |
Jerry Ippoliti (NCAA University Division / Division I independent) (1971–1974)
| 1971 | Jerry Ippoliti | 5–5–1 | | | | | |
| 1972 | Jerry Ippoliti | 7–4 | | | | | |
| 1973 | Jerry Ippoliti | 6–5 | | | | | |
| 1974 | Jerry Ippoliti | 4–7 | | | | | |
Jerry Ippoliti (Mid-American Conference) (1975)
| 1975 | Jerry Ippoliti | 3–8 | 2–3 | 7th | | | |
| Jerry Ippoliti: | | 25–29–1 | 2–3 | | | | |
Pat Culpepper (Mid-American Conference) (1976–1979)
| 1976 | Pat Culpepper | 1–10 | 0–6 | 10th | | | |
| 1977 | Pat Culpepper | 3–8 | 2–5 | 8th | | | |
| 1978 | Pat Culpepper | 5–6 | 2–4 | 7th | | | |
| 1979 | Pat Culpepper | 5–5–1 | 3–3–1 | T–4th | | | |
| Pat Culpepper: | | 14–29–1 | 7–18–1 | | | | |
Bill Mallory (Mid-American Conference) (1980–1983)
| 1980 | Bill Mallory | 7–4 | 4–3 | T–3rd | | | |
| 1981 | Bill Mallory | 3–8 | 2–7 | 9th | | | |
| 1982 | Bill Mallory | 5–5 | 5–4 | T–5th | | | |
| 1983 | Bill Mallory | 10–2 | 8–1 | 1st | W California | | |
| Bill Mallory: | | 25–19 | 19–15 | | | | |
Lee Corso (Mid-American Conference) (1984)
| 1984 | Lee Corso | 4–6–1 | 3–5–1 | 5th | | | |
| Lee Corso: | | 4–6–1 | 3–5–1 | | | | |
Jerry Pettibone (Mid-American Conference) (1985)
| 1985 | Jerry Pettibone | 4–7 | 4–4 | 5th | | | |
Jerry Pettibone (Independent) (1986–1990)
| 1986 | Jerry Pettibone | 2–9 | | | | | |
| 1987 | Jerry Pettibone | 5–5–1 | | | | | |
| 1988 | Jerry Pettibone | 7–4 | | | | | |
| 1989 | Jerry Pettibone | 9–2 | | | | | |
| 1990 | Jerry Pettibone | 6–5 | | | | | |
| Jerry Pettibone: | | 33–32–1 | 4–4 | | | | |
Charlie Sadler (Independent) (1991–1992)
| 1991 | Charlie Sadler | 2–9 | | | | | |
| 1992 | Charlie Sadler | 5–6 | | | | | |
Charlie Sadler (Big West Conference) (1993–1995)
| 1993 | Charlie Sadler | 4–7 | 3–3 | 5th | | | |
| 1994 | Charlie Sadler | 4–7 | 3–3 | T–5th | | | |
| 1995 | Charlie Sadler | 3–8 | 3–3 | T–4th | | | |
| Charlie Sadler: | | 18–37 | 9–9 | | | | |
Joe Novak (Independent) (1996)
| 1996 | Joe Novak | 1–10 | | | | | |
Joe Novak (Mid-American Conference) (1997–2007)
| 1997 | Joe Novak | 0–11 | 0–8 | 6th (West) | | | |
| 1998 | Joe Novak | 2–9 | 2–6 | 5th (West) | | | |
| 1999 | Joe Novak | 5–6 | 5–3 | T–2nd (West) | | | |
| 2000 | Joe Novak | 6–5 | 4–3 | T–3rd (West) | | | |
| 2001 | Joe Novak | 6–5 | 4–3 | T–2nd (West) | | | |
| 2002 | Joe Novak | 8–4 | 7–1 | T–1st (West) | | | |
| 2003 | Joe Novak | 10–2 | 6–2 | T–2nd (West) | | | |
| 2004 | Joe Novak | 9–3 | 7–1 | T–1st (West) | W Silicon Valley | | |
| 2005 | Joe Novak | 7–5 | 6–2 | T–1st (West) | | | |
| 2006 | Joe Novak | 7–6 | 5–3 | T–3rd (West) | L Poinsettia | | |
| 2007 | Joe Novak | 2–10 | 1–6 | 6th (West) | | | |
| Joe Novak: | | 63–76 | 47–38 | | | | |
Jerry Kill (Mid-American Conference) (2008–2010)
| 2008 | Jerry Kill | 6–7 | 5–3 | 4th (West) | L Independence | | |
| 2009 | Jerry Kill | 7–6 | 5–3 | 2nd (West) | L International | | |
| 2010 | Jerry Kill / Tom Matukewicz | 11–3 | 8–0 | 1st (West) | W Humanitarian | | |
| Jerry Kill: | | 23–16 | 18–6 | | | | |
| Tom Matukewicz: | | 1–0 | | | | | |
Dave Doeren (Mid-American Conference) (2011–2012)
| 2011 | Dave Doeren | 11–3 | 7–1 | T–1st (West) | W GoDaddy | | |
| 2012 | Dave Doeren / Rod Carey | 12–2 | 8–0 | 1st (West) | L Orange^{†} | 24 | 22 |
| Dave Doeren: | | 23–4 | 15–1 | | | | |
Rod Carey (Mid-American Conference) (2012–2018)
| 2013 | Rod Carey | 12–2 | 8–0 | 1st (West) | L Poinsettia | | |
| 2014 | Rod Carey | 11–3 | 7–1 | T–1st (West) | L Boca Raton | | |
| 2015 | Rod Carey | 8–6 | 6–2 | T–1st (West) | L Poinsettia | | |
| 2016 | Rod Carey | 5–7 | 5–3 | 3rd (West) | | | |
| 2017 | Rod Carey | 8–5 | 6–2 | T–2nd (West) | L Quick Lane | | |
| 2018 | Rod Carey | 8–6 | 6–2 | 1st (West) | L Boca Raton | | |
| Rod Carey: | | 52–30 | 38–10 | | | | |
Thomas Hammock (Mid-American Conference) (2019–2025)
| 2019 | Thomas Hammock | 5–7 | 4–4 | T–3rd (West) | | | |
| 2020 | Thomas Hammock | 0–6 | 0–6 | 6th (West) | | | |
| 2021 | Thomas Hammock | 9–5 | 6–2 | T–1st (West) | L Cure | | |
| 2022 | Thomas Hammock | 3–9 | 2–6 | 6th (West) | | | |
| 2023 | Thomas Hammock | 7–6 | 5–3 | 2nd (West) | W Camellia | | |
| 2024 | Thomas Hammock | 8–5 | 4–4 | T–6th | W Famous Idaho Potato | | |
| 2025 | Thomas Hammock | 3–9 | 2–6 | T–11th | | | |
| Thomas Hammock: | | 35–47 | 23–31 | | | | |
Rob Harley (Mountain West Conference) (2026–present)
| 2026 | Rob Harley | 0–0 | 0–0 | | | | |
| Total: | | 622–541–51 (.533) | | | | | |
National championship Conference title Conference division title or championship game berth
^{†}Indicates Bowl Coalition, Bowl Alliance, BCS, or CFP / New Years' Six bowl.; ^{#}Rankings from final Coaches Poll.; ^{°}Rankings from final AP Poll.
