= 1923 Southern Illinois Maroons football team =

American college football season

1923 Southern Illinois Maroons football
- Conference: Illinois Intercollegiate Athletic Conference
- Record: 3–2–2 (2–1 IIAC)
- Head coach: William McAndrew (7th season)
- Home stadium: Normal Field

1923 Illinois Intercollegiate Athletic Conference football standings
	Conf.					Overall
Team	W		L		T	W		L		T
Lombard $	4	–	0	–	0	6	–	1	–	0
Mount Morris	2	–	0	–	1	2	–	1	–	2
Knox (IL)	4	–	1	–	0	7	–	1	–	0
Illinois Wesleyan	7	–	2	–	0	7	–	2	–	0
Bradley	6	–	2	–	0	6	–	2	–	0
Southern Illinois	2	–	1	–	0	3	–	2	–	2
Lincoln (IL)	2	–	1	–	2	?	–	?	–	?
Eastern Illinois	3	–	2	–	2	4	–	2	–	2
Monmouth (IL)	4	–	3	–	1	6	–	3	–	1
Illinois College	3	–	3	–	1	3	–	4	–	1
Eureka	4	–	4	–	0	4	–	4	–	0
Millikin	4	–	4	–	0	4	–	5	–	0
Carthage	2	–	3	–	1	4	–	3	–	1
Illinois State Normal	2	–	3	–	2	2	–	4	–	2
Augustana (IL)	3	–	5	–	0	3	–	5	–	0
St. Viator	1	–	2	–	0	5	–	3	–	2
Lake Forest	1	–	3	–	0	2	–	6	–	1
Blackburn	1	–	4	–	1	1	–	5	–	1
Western Illinois	1	–	4	–	1	1	–	6	–	1
Wheaton (IL)	0	–	1	–	1	2	–	3	–	2
Northern Illinois State	0	–	2	–	3	1	–	4	–	3
Shurtleff	0	–	4	–	1	?	–	?	–	?
McKendree	0	–	4	–	0	1	–	5	–	1
$ – Conference champion

The 1923 Southern Illinois Maroons football team was an American football team that represented Southern Illinois Normal University—now known as Southern Illinois University Carbondale— as a member of the Illinois Intercollegiate Athletic Conference (IIAC) during the 1923 college football season. Led by seventh-year head coach William McAndrew, the Maroons compiled an overall record of 3–2–2 with a mark of 2–1 in conference play, tying for sixth place in the IIAC. Southern Illinois played home games at Normal Field in Carbondale, Illinois.

== Schedule ==
Date	Opponent	Site	Result	Source
October 19	Sesser Athletics*	Normal Field; Carbondale, IL	T 6–6	
October 25	at Cape Girardeau*	Cape Girardeau, MO	W 13–0	
November 2	Shurtleff	Normal Field; Carbondale, IL	W 14–6	
November 10	Cape Girardeau*^{†}	Normal Field; Carbondale, IL	L 12–13	
November 17	at Eastern Illinois	Charleston, IL	L 0–23	
November 17	Anna Athletics*	Normal Field; Carbondale, IL	T 6–6	
November 23	McKendree	Normal Field; Carbondale, IL	W 20–7	
*Non-conference game; ^{†}Homecoming
