= 1929 Southern Illinois Maroons football team =

American college football season

1929 Southern Illinois Maroons football
- Conference: Illinois Intercollegiate Athletic Conference
- Record: 5–3–1 (4–2–1 IIAC)
- Head coach: William McAndrew (13th season)

1929 Illinois Intercollegiate Athletic Conference football standings
	Conf.					Overall
Team	W		L		T	W		L		T
Knox (IL) +	5	–	0	–	0	7	–	1	–	0
Lombard +	3	–	0	–	0	6	–	1	–	1
Millikin	5	–	1	–	0	7	–	1	–	0
Eastern Illinois	5	–	1	–	0	6	–	1	–	0
Monmouth (IL)	5	–	1	–	0	5	–	4	–	0
Northern Illinois State	4	–	1	–	1	6	–	1	–	1
Illinois Wesleyan	5	–	2	–	0	5	–	3	–	0
Elmhurst	2	–	1	–	0	8	–	1	–	0
Bradley	4	–	2	–	0	6	–	3	–	0
Southern Illinois	4	–	2	–	0	5	–	3	–	1
Shurtleff	3	–	2	–	0	5	–	3	–	0
Carthage	2	–	2	–	1	4	–	3	–	1
Eureka	3	–	3	–	2	3	–	3	–	2
Illinois College	3	–	3	–	0	4	–	4	–	0
Augustana (IL)	3	–	3	–	1	3	–	4	–	1
North Central *	2	–	4	–	1	3	–	5	–	1
Lake Forest	1	–	2	–	0	2	–	5	–	0
McKendree	1	–	4	–	0	4	–	6	–	0
Wheaton (IL)	1	–	4	–	1	2	–	6	–	1
Illinois State Normal	1	–	5	–	2	1	–	5	–	2
St. Viator	0	–	6	–	1	0	–	7	–	1
Mount Morris	0	–	6	–	0	2	–	6	–	0
Western Illinois †	0	–	7	–	0	0	–	8	–	0
+ – Conference co-champions; * – North Central finished the season 6–0–1 in conference play, but forfeited their share of the title and four wins, over Lake Forest, Augustana, Carthage, and Monmouth, because of an ineligible player. † – Western Illinois finished the season 3–4 in conference play, but forfeited three wins, over Shurtleff, Augustana, and Illinois State, because of an ineligible player.

The 1929 Southern Illinois Maroons football team was an American football team that represented Southern Illinois Normal University (now known as Southern Illinois University Carbondale) in the Illinois Intercollegiate Athletic Conference (IIAC) during the 1929 college football season. In its 13th season under head coach William McAndrew, the team compiled a 5–3–1 record. The team played its home games at Normal Field in Carbondale, Illinois.

== Schedule ==
Date	Opponent	Site	Result	Source
September 28	at St. Viator	Bourbonnais, IL	W 6–0	
October 5	at Lombard	Galesburg, IL	L 0–26	
October 12	at Murray State*	Murray, KY	L 12–13	
October 19	at Illinois State Normal	McCormick Field; Normal, IL	W 6–0	
October 25	Illinois Wesleyan	Carbondale, IL	T 0–0	
November 2	Cape Girardeau*	Carbondale, IL	W 7–0	
November 8	Shurtleff	Carbondale, IL	W 3–0	
November 16	at Eastern Illinois	Schahrer Field; Charleston, IL	L 6–9	
November 23	at McKendree	Lebanon, IL	W 12–6	
*Non-conference game
