= 1926 Bradley Indians football team =

American college football season

1926 Bradley Indians football

IIAC co-champion
- Conference: Illinois Intercollegiate Athletic Conference
- Record: 9–0 (5–0 IIAC)
- Head coach: Alfred J. Robertson (7th season)
- Captain: Francis Pope
- Home stadium: Tech field

1926 Illinois Intercollegiate Athletic Conference football standings
	Conf.					Overall
Team	W		L		T	W		L		T
Bradley +	5	–	0	–	0	9	–	0	–	0
Monmouth (IL) +	5	–	0	–	0	7	–	1	–	0
Lake Forest	1	–	0	–	0	2	–	3	–	3
Illinois College	6	–	2	–	0	6	–	2	–	0
Millikin	6	–	2	–	0	6	–	2	–	0
Shurtleff	6	–	2	–	0	6	–	2	–	0
Augustana (IL)	4	–	2	–	1	5	–	2	–	1
North Central	3	–	2	–	0	5	–	4	–	0
Western Illinois	4	–	3	–	0	4	–	3	–	1
Southern Illinois	1	–	1	–	1	5	–	1	–	2
Illinois State Normal	4	–	4	–	0	4	–	4	–	0
Illinois Wesleyan	3	–	3	–	0	3	–	3	–	1
Carthage	2	–	3	–	1	3	–	3	–	2
Eastern Illinois	2	–	3	–	0	3	–	5	–	1
St. Viator	1	–	2	–	0	3	–	5	–	0
Knox (IL)	1	–	3	–	1	2	–	5	–	1
McKendree	1	–	3	–	1	1	–	6	–	1
Lincoln (IL)	1	–	6	–	0	2	–	6	–	0
Wheaton (IL)	0	–	3	–	1	0	–	6	–	1
Mount Morris	0	–	5	–	1	0	–	6	–	1
Eureka	0	–	6	–	1	0	–	6	–	1
+ – Conference co-champions

The 1926 Bradley Indians football team was an American football team that represented Bradley Polytechnic Institute (now known as Bradley University) during the 1926 college football season as a member of the Illinois Intercollegiate Athletic Conference (IIAC). In Alfred J. Robertson's seventh season as head coach, the team compiled a perfect record of 9–0 for second consecutive year and shared the conference title with the Monmouth Fighting Scots, as it did in 1925. Bradley finished the season on a 24-game winning streak dating back to a loss to Lombard on October 17, 1924.

Fullback Francis Pope was the team's captain. Four Bradley players received first-team honors on the 1926 All-IIAC football team: Pope at fullback; Al DeCremer at left halfback; Carlson at right end; and Becker at left end.

== Schedule ==
Date	Time	Opponent	Site	Result	Source
October 2	2:30 p.m.	at Western State Normal*	Normal field; Kalamazoo, MI	W 12–0	
October 9		Carthage	Peoria, IL	W 58–0	
October 16		St. Viator	Peoria, IL	W 20–0	
October 23		at Lombard*	Galesburg, IL	W 14–6	
October 30		at Wabash*	Crawfordsville, IN	W 14–0	
November 6		Millikin	Peoria, IL	W 20–0	
November 13		Illinois Wesleyan	Peoria, IL	W 12–0	
November 20		Eureka	Peoria, IL	W 31–0	
November 25		Franklin (IN)*	Peoria, IL	W 14–6	
*Non-conference game; All times are in Central time
