= 1924 Southern Illinois Maroons football team =

American college football season

1924 Southern Illinois Maroons football
- Conference: Illinois Intercollegiate Athletic Conference
- Record: 6–2 (1–2 IIAC)
- Head coach: William McAndrew (8th season)
- Home stadium: Normal Field

1924 Illinois Intercollegiate Athletic Conference football standings
	Conf.					Overall
Team	W		L		T	W		L		T
Lombard +	5	–	0	–	0	5	–	4	–	0
Knox (IL) +	4	–	0	–	0	7	–	1	–	0
Bradley	7	–	1	–	0	8	–	1	–	0
Eastern Illinois	5	–	2	–	0	6	–	2	–	0
McKendree *	4	–	2	–	0	4	–	4	–	0
Millikin	4	–	2	–	0	4	–	4	–	0
Monmouth (IL)	5	–	3	–	1	5	–	4	–	1
Shurtleff	3	–	2	–	0	3	–	3	–	0
Wheaton (IL)	3	–	2	–	0	4	–	3	–	0
Western Illinois	3	–	3	–	0	4	–	3	–	0
Illinois College	4	–	4	–	0	5	–	4	–	0
Illinois Wesleyan	4	–	4	–	0	4	–	4	–	0
Eureka	3	–	4	–	1	3	–	4	–	1
Carthage	2	–	3	–	1	3	–	4	–	1
Mount Morris	2	–	3	–	0	5	–	5	–	0
Illinois State Normal	2	–	4	–	2	2	–	4	–	2
Southern Illinois	1	–	2	–	0	6	–	2	–	0
St. Viator †	1	–	2	–	0	1	–	5	–	2
Northern Illinois State	1	–	3	–	0	4	–	4	–	0
Augustana (IL)	2	–	7	–	0	2	–	7	–	0
Lake Forest	1	–	4	–	0	1	–	6	–	0
Lincoln (IL)	1	–	5	–	1	2	–	5	–	1
Blackburn	0	–	4	–	0	1	–	7	–	0
$ – Conference champion; * – McKendree finished the season 5–0–1 in conference play, but forfeited a tie with Illinois College and a win over Eastern Illinois. † – St. Viator finished the season 2–1 in conference play, but forfeited a win over Illinois Wesleyan.

The 1924 Southern Illinois Maroons football team was an American football team that represented Southern Illinois Normal University (now known as Southern Illinois University Carbondale) in the Illinois Intercollegiate Athletic Conference (IIAC) during the 1924 college football season. In its 8th season under head coach William McAndrew, the team compiled a 6–2 record and shut out five of eight opponents. The team played its home games at Normal Field in Carbondale, Illinois.

== Schedule ==
Date	Opponent	Site	Result	Source
October 3	Flat River*	Carbondale, IL	W 41–0	
October 10	Will Mayfield*	Carbondale, IL	W 34–0	
October 17	at Ewing College*	Carbondale, IL	W 66–0	
October 23	at Cape Girardeau*	Cape Girardeau, MO	W 17–14	
October 31	Shurtleff	Carbondale, IL	L 10–14	
November 8	Cape Girardeau*^{†}	Carbondale, IL	W 23–0	
November 14	Eastern Illinois	Carbondale, IL	W 7–0	
November 21	at McKendree	Lebanon, IL	L 6–42	
*Non-conference game; ^{†}Homecoming
