= 1927 Southern Illinois Maroons football team =

American college football season

1927 Southern Illinois Maroons football
- Conference: Illinois Intercollegiate Athletic Conference
- Record: 3–5–2 (2–1 IIAC)
- Head coach: William McAndrew (11th season)

1927 Illinois Intercollegiate Athletic Conference football standings
	Conf.					Overall
Team	W		L		T	W		L		T
Bradley $	6	–	1	–	0	6	–	3	–	0
Illinois Wesleyan	6	–	2	–	1	6	–	2	–	1
Eastern Illinois	3	–	1	–	0	5	–	2	–	0
Monmouth (IL)	3	–	1	–	0	4	–	4	–	0
Millikin	3	–	1	–	1	3	–	3	–	1
St. Viator	3	–	1	–	0	6	–	2	–	1
North Central	2	–	1	–	1	5	–	3	–	1
Southern Illinois	2	–	1	–	0	3	–	5	–	2
McKendree	3	–	2	–	1	6	–	2	–	2
Knox (IL)	3	–	2	–	0	4	–	4	–	0
Western Illinois	5	–	3	–	1	6	–	3	–	1
Lake Forest	0	–	0	–	1	3	–	2	–	3
Illinois State Normal	4	–	4	–	0	4	–	4	–	0
Illinois College	3	–	4	–	1	3	–	4	–	1
Mount Morris	2	–	3	–	0	5	–	3	–	0
Carthage	1	–	2	–	2	2	–	3	–	2
Shurtleff	1	–	2	–	2	4	–	3	–	1
Lincoln (IL)	2	–	6	–	0	3	–	6	–	0
Augustana (IL)	1	–	5	–	0	2	–	5	–	0
Wheaton (IL)	0	–	2	–	0	2	–	4	–	1
Eureka	0	–	9	–	0	0	–	9	–	0
$ – Conference champion

The 1927 Southern Illinois Maroons football team was an American football team that represented Southern Illinois Normal University (now known as Southern Illinois University Carbondale) in the Illinois Intercollegiate Athletic Conference (IIAC) during the 1927 college football season. In its 11th season under head coach William McAndrew, the team compiled a 3–5–2 record. The team played its home games at Normal Field in Carbondale, Illinois.

== Schedule ==
Date	Opponent	Site	Result	Attendance	Source
September 24	at Saint Louis*	St. Louis University Athletic Field; St. Louis, MO	L 6–20	2,000	
September 30	at Murray State*	Murray, KY	L 3–6		
October 7	Will Mayfield*	Carbondale, IL	L 0–26		
October 14	Tennessee Junior*	Carbondale, IL	W 37–7		
October 21	at Jonesboro A&M*	Kays Field; Jonesboro, AR	L 0–14		
October 28	Shurtleff	Carbondale, IL	W 7–0		
November 5	Cape Girardeau*	Carbondale, IL	T 6–6		
November 12	at Eastern Illinois	Schahrer Field; Charleston, IL	L 2–14		
November 18	McKendree	Carbondale, IL	W 6–0		
November 24	at Cape Girardeau*	Cape Girardeau, MO	T 0–0		
*Non-conference game
