= 1925 Southern Illinois Maroons football team =

American college football season

1925 Southern Illinois Maroons football
- Conference: Illinois Intercollegiate Athletic Conference
- Record: 0–5–1 (0–2 IIAC)
- Head coach: William McAndrew (9th season)
- Captain: Floyd
- Home stadium: Normal Field

1925 Illinois Intercollegiate Athletic Conference football standings
	Conf.					Overall
Team	W		L		T	W		L		T
Bradley +	5	–	0	–	0	9	–	0	–	0
Monmouth (IL) +	6	–	0	–	1	7	–	0	–	2
Millikin	5	–	0	–	1	6	–	1	–	1
McKendree	5	–	1	–	0	5	–	3	–	1
Lake Forest	2	–	1	–	0	5	–	2	–	0
Knox (IL)	2	–	1	–	0	2	–	6	–	0
St. Viator	3	–	2	–	0	5	–	3	–	1
Carthage	3	–	2	–	1	4	–	4	–	1
Augustana (IL)	4	–	3	–	1	4	–	3	–	1
Western Illinois	4	–	3	–	1	4	–	3	–	1
Eureka	5	–	4	–	0	5	–	4	–	0
Hedding	1	–	1	–	0	2	–	2	–	1
Shurtleff	3	–	4	–	1	4	–	5	–	1
Eastern Illinois	1	–	2	–	0	4	–	3	–	1
Illinois College	2	–	4	–	3	3	–	4	–	3
Lincoln (IL)	2	–	4	–	1	2	–	5	–	1
Mount Morris	1	–	2	–	0	2	–	5	–	0
Wheaton (IL)	1	–	5	–	0	1	–	7	–	0
Illinois State Normal	1	–	6	–	0	1	–	6	–	0
Illinois Wesleyan	0	–	5	–	1	1	–	6	–	1
Southern Illinois	0	–	2	–	0	0	–	5	–	1
Blackburn	0	–	2	–	0	0	–	3	–	0
North-Western College	0	–	6	–	0	1	–	6	–	0
$ – Conference champion

The 1925 Southern Illinois Maroons football team was an American football team that represented Southern Illinois Normal University (now known as Southern Illinois University Carbondale) in the Illinois Intercollegiate Athletic Conference (IIAC) during the 1925 college football season. In its 9th season under head coach William McAndrew, the team compiled a 0–5–1 record, failed to score a point, and was outscored by a total of 31 to 0. The loss to Will Mayfield College was a forfeit resulting from confusion as to the date of the game. The team played its home games at Normal Field in Carbondale, Illinois.

== Schedule ==
Date	Opponent	Site	Result	Source
October 20	at Cape Girardeau*	Scott Field; Cape Girardeau, MO	L 0–10	
October 26	Scott Field*	Normal Field; Carbondale, IL	L 0–6	
October 31	Shurtleff	Normal Field; Carbondale, IL	L 0–7	
November 7	Cape Girardeau*^{†}	Normal Field; Carbondale, IL	T 0–0	
November 13	at Will Mayfield*	Marble Hill, MO	L 0–2 (forfeit)	
November 21	McKendree	Normal Field; Carbondale, IL	L 0–6	
*Non-conference game; ^{†}Homecoming
