= 1927 Bradley Indians football team =

American college football season

1927 Bradley Indians football

IIAC champion
- Conference: Illinois Intercollegiate Athletic Conference
- Record: 6–3 (6–1 IIAC)
- Head coach: Alfred J. Robertson (8th season)
- Home stadium: Bradley Field

1927 Illinois Intercollegiate Athletic Conference football standings
	Conf.					Overall
Team	W		L		T	W		L		T
Bradley $	6	–	1	–	0	6	–	3	–	0
Illinois Wesleyan	6	–	2	–	1	6	–	2	–	1
Eastern Illinois	3	–	1	–	0	5	–	2	–	0
Monmouth (IL)	3	–	1	–	0	4	–	4	–	0
Millikin	3	–	1	–	1	3	–	3	–	1
St. Viator	3	–	1	–	0	6	–	2	–	1
North Central	2	–	1	–	1	5	–	3	–	1
Southern Illinois	2	–	1	–	0	3	–	5	–	2
McKendree	3	–	2	–	1	6	–	2	–	2
Knox (IL)	3	–	2	–	0	4	–	4	–	0
Western Illinois	5	–	3	–	1	6	–	3	–	1
Lake Forest	0	–	0	–	1	3	–	2	–	3
Illinois State Normal	4	–	4	–	0	4	–	4	–	0
Illinois College	3	–	4	–	1	3	–	5	–	1
Mount Morris	2	–	3	–	0	5	–	3	–	0
Carthage	1	–	2	–	2	2	–	3	–	2
Shurtleff	1	–	2	–	2	4	–	3	–	1
Lincoln (IL)	2	–	6	–	0	3	–	6	–	0
Augustana (IL)	1	–	5	–	0	2	–	5	–	0
Wheaton (IL)	0	–	2	–	0	2	–	4	–	1
Eureka	0	–	9	–	0	0	–	9	–	0
$ – Conference champion

The 1927 Bradley Indians football team was an American football team that represented Bradley Polytechnic Institute (now known as Bradley University) as a member of the Illinois Intercollegiate Athletic Conference (IIAC) during the 1927 college football season. Led by eighth-year head coach Alfred J. Robertson, the Indians compiled and overall record of 6–3 with a mark of 6–1 in conference play, winning the IIAC title for the third consecutive season.

== Schedule ==
Date	Time	Opponent	Site	Result	Attendance	Source
September 24		Western Illinois	Peoria, IL	W 26–7		
October 1		at Illinois*	Memorial Stadium; Champaign, IL	L 0–19	9,000	
October 15		Knox (IL)^{†}	Peoria, IL	W 34–6	4,000	
October 22		at Augustana (IL)	Rock Island, IL	W 58–0		
October 29		St. Viator	Peoria, IL	W 43–0		
November 5		Wabash*	Bradley Field; Peoria, IL	L 7–13		
November 11		at Illinois Wesleyan	Wilder Field; Bloomington, IL	W 12–0		
November 19		Eureka	Peoria, IL	W 59–0		
November 24	2:00 p.m.	Millikin	Bradley Field; Peoria, IL	L 2–6	5,000	
*Non-conference game; ^{†}Homecoming
