= 1926 Southern Illinois Maroons football team =

American college football season

1926 Southern Illinois Maroons football
- Conference: Illinois Intercollegiate Athletic Conference
- Record: 5–1–2 (1–1–1 IIAC)
- Head coach: William McAndrew (10th season)
- Home stadium: Normal Field

1926 Illinois Intercollegiate Athletic Conference football standings
	Conf.					Overall
Team	W		L		T	W		L		T
Bradley +	5	–	0	–	0	9	–	0	–	0
Monmouth (IL) +	5	–	0	–	0	7	–	1	–	0
Lake Forest	1	–	0	–	0	2	–	3	–	3
Illinois College	6	–	2	–	0	6	–	2	–	0
Millikin	6	–	2	–	0	6	–	2	–	0
Shurtleff	6	–	2	–	0	6	–	2	–	0
Augustana (IL)	4	–	2	–	1	5	–	2	–	1
North Central	3	–	2	–	0	5	–	4	–	0
Western Illinois	4	–	3	–	0	4	–	3	–	1
Southern Illinois	1	–	1	–	1	5	–	1	–	2
Illinois State Normal	4	–	4	–	0	4	–	4	–	0
Illinois Wesleyan	3	–	3	–	0	3	–	3	–	1
Carthage	2	–	3	–	1	3	–	3	–	2
Eastern Illinois	2	–	3	–	0	3	–	5	–	1
St. Viator	1	–	2	–	0	3	–	5	–	0
Knox (IL)	1	–	3	–	1	2	–	5	–	1
McKendree	1	–	3	–	1	1	–	6	–	1
Lincoln (IL)	1	–	6	–	0	2	–	6	–	0
Wheaton (IL)	0	–	3	–	1	0	–	6	–	1
Mount Morris	0	–	5	–	1	0	–	6	–	1
Eureka	0	–	6	–	1	0	–	6	–	1
+ – Conference co-champions

The 1926 Southern Illinois Maroons football team was an American football team that represented Southern Illinois Normal University (now known as Southern Illinois University Carbondale) in the Illinois Intercollegiate Athletic Conference (IIAC) during the 1926 college football season. In its 10th season under head coach William McAndrew, the team compiled a 5–1–2 record. The team played its home games at Normal Field in Carbondale, Illinois.

== Schedule ==
Date	Opponent	Site	Result	Source
October 9	Will Mayfield*	Carbondale, IL	W 21–0	
October 15	at Hall-Moody*	Martin, TN	W 13–7	
October 22	Jonesboro A&M*	Carbondale, IL	W 10–0	
October 30	at Shurtleff	Alton, IL	L 0–20	
November 5	Cape Girardeau*	Carbondale, IL	T 0–0	
November 13	Eastern Illinois	Carbondale, IL	W 23–0	
November 20	at McKendree	Lebanon, IL	T 0–0	
November 25	at Cape Girardeau*	Cape Girardeau, MO	W 7–0	
*Non-conference game
