= 1924 Northern Illinois State Teachers football team =

American college football season

1924 Northern Illinois State Teachers football
- Conference: Illinois Intercollegiate Athletic Conference
- Record: 4–4 (1–3 IIAC)
- Head coach: William Muir (2nd season)
- Captain: Pete Ball
- Home stadium: Glidden Field

1924 Illinois Intercollegiate Athletic Conference football standings
	Conf.					Overall
Team	W		L		T	W		L		T
Lombard +	5	–	0	–	0	5	–	4	–	0
Knox (IL) +	4	–	0	–	0	7	–	1	–	0
Bradley	7	–	1	–	0	8	–	1	–	0
Eastern Illinois	5	–	2	–	0	6	–	2	–	0
McKendree *	4	–	2	–	0	4	–	4	–	0
Millikin	4	–	2	–	0	4	–	4	–	0
Monmouth (IL)	5	–	3	–	1	5	–	4	–	1
Shurtleff	3	–	2	–	0	3	–	3	–	0
Wheaton (IL)	3	–	2	–	0	4	–	3	–	0
Western Illinois	3	–	3	–	0	4	–	3	–	0
Illinois College	4	–	4	–	0	5	–	4	–	0
Illinois Wesleyan	4	–	4	–	0	4	–	4	–	0
Eureka	3	–	4	–	1	3	–	4	–	1
Carthage	2	–	3	–	1	3	–	4	–	1
Mount Morris	2	–	3	–	0	5	–	5	–	0
Illinois State Normal	2	–	4	–	2	2	–	4	–	2
Southern Illinois	1	–	2	–	0	6	–	2	–	0
St. Viator †	1	–	2	–	0	1	–	5	–	2
Northern Illinois State	1	–	3	–	0	4	–	4	–	0
Augustana (IL)	2	–	7	–	0	2	–	7	–	0
Lake Forest	1	–	4	–	0	1	–	6	–	0
Lincoln (IL)	1	–	5	–	1	2	–	5	–	1
Blackburn	0	–	4	–	0	1	–	7	–	0
$ – Conference champion; * – McKendree finished the season 5–0–1 in conference play, but forfeited a tie with Illinois College and a win over Eastern Illinois. † – St. Viator finished the season 2–1 in conference play, but forfeited a win over Illinois Wesleyan.

The 1924 Northern Illinois State Teachers football team represented Northern Illinois State Teachers College in the 1924 college football season. The team competed in the Illinois Intercollegiate Athletic Conference, which was also known as the Little Nineteen. They were led by second-year head coach William Muir and played their home games at Glidden Field, located on the east end of campus. The Teachers finished the season with a 4–4 record and an 1–3 record in conference play. Pete Ball was the team's captain.

== Schedule ==
Date	Opponent	Site	Result	Source
October 4	Elmhurst*	Glidden Field; DeKalb, IL	W 45–0	
October 9	Milton*	Glidden Field; DeKalb, IL	W 17–7	
October 17	at DePaul*	Chicago, IL	L 6–9	
October 25	at Illinois State Normal	Normal, IL	L 6–9	
November 1	at Mount Morris	Mount Morris, IL	L 0–37	
November 8	at St. Joseph's (IN)*	Rensselaer, IN	W 42–0	
November 15	Wheaton (IL)	Glidden Field; DeKalb, IL	W 33–14	
November 22	Eureka	Glidden Field; DeKalb, IL	L 7–9	
*Non-conference game
