= 1923 Lombard Olive football team =

American college football season

1923 Lombard Olive football

IIAC champion
- Conference: Illinois Intercollegiate Athletic Conference
- Record: 6–1 (4–0 IIAC)
- Head coach: Paul J. Schissler (3rd season)
- Captain: Bob Hannum
- Home stadium: Lombard Stadium

1923 Illinois Intercollegiate Athletic Conference football standings
	Conf.					Overall
Team	W		L		T	W		L		T
Lombard $	4	–	0	–	0	6	–	1	–	0
Mount Morris	2	–	0	–	1	2	–	1	–	2
Knox (IL)	4	–	1	–	0	7	–	1	–	0
Illinois Wesleyan	7	–	2	–	0	7	–	2	–	0
Bradley	6	–	2	–	0	6	–	2	–	0
Southern Illinois	2	–	1	–	0	3	–	2	–	2
Lincoln (IL)	2	–	1	–	2	?	–	?	–	?
Eastern Illinois	3	–	2	–	2	4	–	2	–	2
Monmouth (IL)	4	–	3	–	1	6	–	3	–	1
Illinois College	3	–	3	–	1	3	–	4	–	1
Eureka	4	–	4	–	0	4	–	4	–	0
Millikin	4	–	4	–	0	4	–	5	–	0
Carthage	2	–	3	–	1	4	–	3	–	1
Illinois State Normal	2	–	3	–	2	2	–	4	–	2
Augustana (IL)	3	–	5	–	0	3	–	5	–	0
St. Viator	1	–	2	–	0	5	–	3	–	2
Lake Forest	1	–	3	–	0	2	–	6	–	1
Blackburn	1	–	4	–	1	1	–	5	–	1
Western Illinois	1	–	4	–	1	1	–	6	–	1
Wheaton (IL)	0	–	1	–	1	2	–	3	–	2
Northern Illinois State	0	–	2	–	3	1	–	4	–	3
Shurtleff	0	–	4	–	1	?	–	?	–	?
McKendree	0	–	4	–	0	1	–	5	–	1
$ – Conference champion

The 1923 Lombard Olive football team was an American football team that represented Lombard College during the 1923 college football season. In its third year under head coach Paul J. Schissler, the team compiled a 6–1 record.

== Schedule ==
Date	Time	Opponent	Site	Result	Attendance	Source
October 7		at Notre Dame*	Cartier Field; Notre Dame, IN	L 0–14	8,000	
October 20		at Bradley	Pearoria, IL	W 13–7	6,550+	
October 26	2:30 p.m.	Illinois Wesleyan	Lombard Stadium; Galesburg, IL	W 37–0		
November 3		Wabash*	Lombard Stadium; Galesburg, IL	W 28–0		
November 9		Northern Illinois State	Lombard Stadium; Galesburg, IL (Swannie Day)	W 62–6		
November 16		Knox (IL)	Lombard Stadium; Galesburg, IL	W 20–0	5,000+	
November 29		Kalamazoo*	"Old" Football Stadium; Kalamazoo, MI	W 70–0		
*Non-conference game
