= 1923 Northern Illinois State Teachers football team =

American college football season

1923 Northern Illinois State Teachers football
- Conference: Illinois Intercollegiate Athletic Conference
- Record: 1–4–3 (0–2–3 IIAC)
- Head coach: William Muir (1st season)
- Captain: Elmer Kujala
- Home stadium: Glidden Field

1923 Illinois Intercollegiate Athletic Conference football standings
	Conf.					Overall
Team	W		L		T	W		L		T
Lombard $	4	–	0	–	0	6	–	1	–	0
Mount Morris	2	–	0	–	1	2	–	1	–	2
Knox (IL)	4	–	1	–	0	7	–	1	–	0
Illinois Wesleyan	7	–	2	–	0	7	–	2	–	0
Bradley	6	–	2	–	0	6	–	2	–	0
Southern Illinois	2	–	1	–	0	3	–	2	–	2
Lincoln (IL)	2	–	1	–	2	?	–	?	–	?
Eastern Illinois	3	–	2	–	2	4	–	2	–	2
Monmouth (IL)	4	–	3	–	1	6	–	3	–	1
Illinois College	3	–	3	–	1	3	–	4	–	1
Eureka	4	–	4	–	0	4	–	4	–	0
Millikin	4	–	4	–	0	4	–	5	–	0
Carthage	2	–	3	–	1	4	–	3	–	1
Illinois State Normal	2	–	3	–	2	2	–	4	–	2
Augustana (IL)	3	–	5	–	0	3	–	5	–	0
St. Viator	1	–	2	–	0	5	–	3	–	2
Lake Forest	1	–	3	–	0	2	–	6	–	1
Blackburn	1	–	4	–	1	1	–	5	–	1
Western Illinois	1	–	4	–	1	1	–	6	–	1
Wheaton (IL)	0	–	1	–	1	2	–	3	–	2
Northern Illinois State	0	–	2	–	3	1	–	4	–	3
Shurtleff	0	–	4	–	1	?	–	?	–	?
McKendree	0	–	4	–	0	1	–	5	–	1
$ – Conference champion

The 1923 Northern Illinois State Teachers football team represented Northern Illinois State Teachers College in the 1923 college football season. The team competed in the Illinois Intercollegiate Athletic Conference, which was also known as the Little Nineteen. They were led by first-year head coach William Muir and played their home games at Glidden Field, located on the east end of campus. The Teachers finished the season with an 1–4–3 record and an 0–2–3 record in conference play. Elmer Kujala was the team's captain.

== Schedule ==
Date	Opponent	Site	Result	Source
September 22	Elmhurst*	Glidden Field; DeKalb, IL	W 40–0	
September 29	at Beloit*	Beloit, WI	L 7–33	
October 6	at Whitewater State*	Whitewater, WI	L 0–29	
October 13	Illinois State Normal	Glidden Field; DeKalb, IL	T 0–0	
October 26	at Eureka	Eureka, IL	L 0–28	
November 9	at Lombard	Lombard Stadium; Lombard, IL	L 6–62	
November 16	Mount Morris	Glidden Field; DeKalb, IL	T 13–13	
November 24	at Wheaton (IL)	Wheaton, IL	T 7–7	
*Non-conference game
