= 1929 Northern Illinois State Teachers football team =

American college football season

1929 Northern Illinois State Teachers football
- Conference: Illinois Intercollegiate Athletic Conference
- Record: 6–1–1 (4–1–1 IIAC)
- Head coach: Chick Evans (1st season)
- Captain: Leland Strombom
- Home stadium: Glidden Field

1929 Illinois Intercollegiate Athletic Conference football standings
	Conf.					Overall
Team	W		L		T	W		L		T
Knox (IL) +	5	–	0	–	0	7	–	1	–	0
Lombard +	3	–	0	–	0	6	–	1	–	1
Millikin	5	–	1	–	0	7	–	1	–	0
Eastern Illinois	5	–	1	–	0	6	–	1	–	0
Monmouth (IL)	5	–	1	–	0	5	–	4	–	0
Northern Illinois State	4	–	1	–	1	6	–	1	–	1
Illinois Wesleyan	5	–	2	–	0	5	–	3	–	0
Elmhurst	2	–	1	–	0	8	–	1	–	0
Bradley	4	–	2	–	0	6	–	3	–	0
Southern Illinois	4	–	2	–	0	5	–	3	–	1
Shurtleff	3	–	2	–	0	5	–	3	–	0
Carthage	2	–	2	–	1	4	–	3	–	1
Eureka	3	–	3	–	2	3	–	3	–	2
Illinois College	3	–	3	–	0	4	–	4	–	0
Augustana (IL)	3	–	3	–	1	3	–	4	–	1
North Central *	2	–	4	–	1	3	–	5	–	1
Lake Forest	1	–	2	–	0	2	–	5	–	0
McKendree	1	–	4	–	0	4	–	6	–	0
Wheaton (IL)	1	–	4	–	1	2	–	6	–	1
Illinois State Normal	1	–	5	–	2	1	–	5	–	2
St. Viator	0	–	6	–	1	0	–	7	–	1
Mount Morris	0	–	6	–	0	2	–	6	–	0
Western Illinois †	0	–	7	–	0	0	–	8	–	0
+ – Conference co-champions; * – North Central finished the season 6–0–1 in conference play, but forfeited their share of the title and four wins, over Lake Forest, Augustana, Carthage, and Monmouth, because of an ineligible player. † – Western Illinois finished the season 3–4 in conference play, but forfeited three wins, over Shurtleff, Augustana, and Illinois State, because of an ineligible player.

The 1929 Northern Illinois State Teachers football team represented Northern Illinois State Teachers College—now known as Northern Illinois University—as a member of the Illinois Intercollegiate Athletic Conference (IIAC) during the 1929 college football season. Led by first-year head coach Chick Evans, the Evansmen compiled an overall record of 6–1–1 with a mark of 4–1–1 in conference play, tying for sixth place in the IIAC. The team played home games at the 5,500-seat Glidden Field, located on the east end of campus, in DeKalb, Illinois.

== Schedule ==
Date	Opponent	Site	Result	Source
September 28	LaSalle-Peru JC*	Glidden Field; DeKalb, IL	W 12–0	
October 5	at North Central	Naperville, IL	T 6–6	
October 12	at Elmhurst	Elmhurst, IL	W 14–0	
October 19	Mount Morris	Glidden Field; DeKalb, IL	W 26–0	
October 26	at Shurtleff	Alton, IL	L 0–6	
November 2	at Valparaiso*	Brown Field; Valparaiso, IN	W 34–0	
November 9	at Illinois State Normal	Normal, IL	W 12–6	
November 15	Wheaton (IL)	Glidden Field; DeKalb, IL	W 20–6	
*Non-conference game
