= Paul J. Schissler =

American sports coach

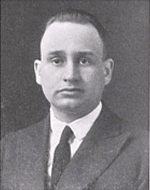
- Schissler from 1918 Cornhusker

Biographical details
- Born: November 11, 1893; Hastings, Nebraska, U.S.
- Died: April 16, 1968 (aged 74); Hastings, Nebraska, U.S.

Coaching career (HC unless noted)

Football
- 1913–1914: Hastings HS (NE)
- 1915: Doane
- 1916: St. Viator
- 1918–1920: Nebraska (assistant)
- 1921–1923: Lombard
- 1924–1932: Oregon Agricultural
- 1933–1934: Chicago Cardinals
- 1935–1936: Brooklyn Dodgers
- 1942–1944: March Field

Basketball
- 1915–1916: Doane
- 1918–1919: Nebraska Wesleyan
- 1919–1921: Nebraska

Baseball
- 1919–1921: Nebraska

Head coaching record
- Overall: 110–41–6 (college football); 14–29–3 (NFL); 41–17 (college basketball); 20–14 (college baseball)

Accomplishments and honors

Championships
- Football; 3 IIAC (1921–1923); 1 Northwest Conference (1925)

Paul John Schissler (November 11, 1893 – April 16, 1968) was an American football, basketball, and baseball coach. He coached football at the high school, college, and professional levels, and is credited with starting the National Football League's annual Pro Bowl.

== Coaching career ==
Schissler first coaching position was as the head football coach at Hastings High School in Hastings, Nebraska. He had been a stand-out athlete at HHS, graduating in 1911. He coached there for two seasons, from 1913 to 1914.

=== College ===
Schissler with the legendary coach of Notre Dame, Knute Rockne, 1928.

Schissler's first collegiate position was as the 16th head football coach at Doane College in Crete, Nebraska. He only coached one season with Doane College during the 1915 season and had a record of 5–3. Schissler left Doane to become the head football coach at St. Viator College in Bourbonnais, Illinois where he coached again for only one season in 1916.

In 1919, Schissler went to the University of Nebraska. There he was an assistant football coach, the head basketball coach, and the head baseball coach. Schissler was the head coach of the basketball team for two seasons, posting a 37–5 overall record.^{[i]} As the head baseball coach at Nebraska, Schissler posted a three-year record of 20–14.

In 1921, Schissler was appointed as the athletic director at Lombard College in Galesburg, Illinois.

Schissler was the head football coach for Oregon State from 1924 to 1932. During his nine-year tenure, he compiled a 48–30–2 (.613) record. He led the Beavers to three seven-win seasons in 1925, 1926, and 1930. He was known for opening seasons strong, having had a 76–0 win against Willamette University, a 67–0 win against Multnomah Athletic Club, and a 51–0 win against Willamette.

=== NFL ===
Schissler first foray in to coaching in the NFL came in 1933 when he was hired by Charles Bidwill, new owner of the Chicago Cardinals. He would remain in that position for the 1932 and 1933 seasons, compiling a two-year record of 6–15–1.

From 1935 to 1936, he was the head coach for the Brooklyn Dodgers, the second NFL team in New York City, compiling a record of 8–14–2.

=== Later career ===
Schissler later owned and coached the Hollywood Bears of the Pacific Coast Professional Football League (PCPFL). There he coached and played with Kenny Washington before Washington was allowed to play in the NFL. Schissler sold Washington's contract to the Los Angeles Rams in 1946. Schissler also coached the Hollywood Stars of the California Pro Football League, and during World War II served in the military where he also coached a football team. Later, Schissler helped start the Pro Bowl in 1951 while working for the Los Angeles Times.

== Death ==
Schissler died in Hastings, Nebraska, on April 16, 1968, at the age of 74.

== Head coaching record ==
=== College football ===
Year	Team	Overall	Conference	Standing	Bowl/playoffs	AP^{#}
Doane Tigers (Independent) (1915)
1915	Doane	5–3				
Doane:		5–3				
St. Viator (Illinois Intercollegiate Athletic Conference) (1916)
1916	St. Viator	6–2				
St. Viator:		6–2				
Lombard Olive (Illinois Intercollegiate Athletic Conference) (1921–1923)
1921	Lombard	9–0	5–0	1st		
1922	Lombard	7–0–2	3–0–1	T–1st		
1923	Lombard	6–1	4–0	1st		
Lombard:		22–1–2	12–0–1			
Oregon Agricultural Aggies (Northwest Conference / Pacific Coast Conference) (1924–1932)
1924	Oregon Agricultural	3–5	2–3 / 1–4	T–5th / 7th		
1925	Oregon Agricultural	7–2	7–0 / 3–2	T–1st / T–3rd		
Oregon Agricultural Aggies / Oregon State Aggies / Oregon State Beavers (Pacific Coast Conference) (1926–1932)
1926	Oregon Agricultural	7–1	4–1	T–3rd		
1927	Oregon State	3–3–1	2–3	T–5th		
1928	Oregon State	6–3	2–3	T–6th		
1929	Oregon State	5–4	1–4	T–7th		
1930	Oregon State	7–3	2–3	6th		
1931	Oregon State	6–3–1	1–3–1	7th		
1932	Oregon State	4–6	1–4	T–8th		
Oregon Agricultural / State:		48–30–2	22–27–1			
March Field Flyers (Independent) (1942–1944)
1942	March Field	11–2				
1943	March Field	9–1				10
1944	March Field	7–2–2				10
March Field:		27–5–2				
Total:		110–41–6				
National championship Conference title Conference division title or championship game berth
^{#}Rankings from final AP Poll.

== Notes ==
i. ^ ^{a} Nebraska basketball media guide has name spelled 'Schlisser', however other documents do show Schissler as a coach at Nebraska during that time frame, including the Nebraska baseball media guide.
