= 1924 Lombard Olive football team =

American college football season

1924 Lombard Olive football

IIAC co-champion
- Conference: Illinois Intercollegiate Athletic Conference
- Record: 5–4 (5–0 IIAC)
- Head coach: Harry M. Bell (1st season)
- Home stadium: Lombard Stadium

1924 Illinois Intercollegiate Athletic Conference football standings
	Conf.					Overall
Team	W		L		T	W		L		T
Lombard +	5	–	0	–	0	5	–	4	–	0
Knox (IL) +	4	–	0	–	0	7	–	1	–	0
Bradley	7	–	1	–	0	8	–	1	–	0
Eastern Illinois	5	–	2	–	0	6	–	2	–	0
McKendree *	4	–	2	–	0	4	–	4	–	0
Millikin	4	–	2	–	0	4	–	4	–	0
Monmouth (IL)	5	–	3	–	1	5	–	4	–	1
Shurtleff	3	–	2	–	0	3	–	3	–	0
Wheaton (IL)	3	–	2	–	0	4	–	3	–	0
Western Illinois	3	–	3	–	0	4	–	3	–	0
Illinois College	4	–	4	–	0	5	–	4	–	0
Illinois Wesleyan	4	–	4	–	0	4	–	4	–	0
Eureka	3	–	4	–	1	3	–	4	–	1
Carthage	2	–	3	–	1	3	–	4	–	1
Mount Morris	2	–	3	–	0	5	–	5	–	0
Illinois State Normal	2	–	4	–	2	2	–	4	–	2
Southern Illinois	1	–	2	–	0	6	–	2	–	0
St. Viator †	1	–	2	–	0	1	–	5	–	2
Northern Illinois State	1	–	3	–	0	4	–	4	–	0
Augustana (IL)	2	–	7	–	0	2	–	7	–	0
Lake Forest	1	–	4	–	0	1	–	6	–	0
Lincoln (IL)	1	–	5	–	1	2	–	5	–	1
Blackburn	0	–	4	–	0	1	–	7	–	0
$ – Conference champion; * – McKendree finished the season 5–0–1 in conference play, but forfeited a tie with Illinois College and a win over Eastern Illinois. † – St. Viator finished the season 2–1 in conference play, but forfeited a win over Illinois Wesleyan.

The 1924 Lombard Olive football team represented Lombard College in the 1924 college football season.

== Schedule ==
Date	Opponent	Site	Result	Attendance	Source
October 4	at Notre Dame*	Cartier Field; Notre Dame, IN	L 0–40	9,000	
October 17	Bradley	Lombard Stadium; Galesburg, IL	W 7–0		
October 25	at Illinois Wesleyan	Bloomington, IN	W 34–0		
November 1	at John Carroll*	Cleveland, OH	L 0–17		
November 8	Mount Morris	Lombard Stadium; Galesburg, IN	W 76–3		
November 15	Lake Forest	Lombard Stadium; Galesburg, IN	W 44–0		
November 22	Valparaiso	Lombard Stadium; Galesburg, IN	W 14–7		
November 27	at Tennessee Docs*	Russwood Park; Memphis, TN	L 7–40		
December 4	at Centenary*	Centenary Athletic Field; Shreveport, LA	L 0–38		
*Non-conference game
