= Sam J. McAllister =

American sports coach (1903–1975)

Biographical details
- Born: 1903
- Died: November 5, 1975 (aged 72)

Playing career
- 1923–1926: St. Viator
- Positions: Tackle (football); Guard (basketball); Pitcher (baseball)

Coaching career (HC unless noted)

Football
- 1926–1930: St. Viator
- 1938–1942: Florida (assistant)
- 1946–1950: Florida (assistant)

Basketball
- 1926–1930: St. Viator
- 1930–1933: Auburn
- 1937–1942: Florida
- 1946–1951: Florida

Baseball
- 1927–1930: St. Viator
- 1931–1933: Auburn
- 1940–1942: Florida
- 1946–1947: Florida

Head coaching record
- Overall: 15–25–2 (football); 194–133 (basketball); 91–74–4 (baseball) (Note: Auburn Tigers baseball records are incomplete for 1931 and 1932, and are omitted from career win–loss record.)

Samuel J. McAllister (1903 – November 5, 1975) was an American college basketball, baseball and football coach.

== Early life and education ==
McAllister attended St. Viator College in Bourbonnais, Illinois, where he was standout athlete for the St. Viator Irish football, basketball and baseball teams.

== Coaching career ==
McAllister graduated from St. Viator in 1926, and was elected the "head coach of athletics" immediately thereafter. He coached the St. Viator football, basketball and baseball teams from 1926 to 1930, and compiled win–loss records of 46–14 in baseball and 51–19 in basketball in four seasons.

In December 1930, McAllister was hired to be the head coach of the Auburn Tigers men's basketball and the Auburn Tigers baseball teams of Alabama Polytechnic Institute in Auburn, Alabama, positions he held from 1930 to 1933. He compiled an overall win–loss record of 25–18 as the Tigers' basketball coach; the Tigers' baseball records for 1931–1933 are incomplete.

McAllister later served as the head coach of the Florida Gators men's basketball team of the University of Florida in Gainesville, Florida, from 1937 to 1942 and again from 1946 to 1951, leading the Gators to an overall record of 119–96 in ten seasons. McAllister was also the head coach of the Florida Gators baseball team from 1940 to 1942 and from 1946 to 1947, and compiled an overall record of 40–56–4 in five seasons. During his stints as the head coach of the Gators' basketball and baseball teams, he also served as the line coach and assistant for the Florida Gators football team under head coaches Josh Cody, Tom Lieb and Raymond Wolf from 1938 to 1942, and again from 1946 to 1950, while doubling as the head coach of the Gators' freshman football team known as the "Omelette Squad."

== Late life and death ==
McAllister died on November 5, 1975, at the age of 72.

== Head coaching record ==
=== Football ===
Year	Team	Overall	Conference	Standing	Bowl/playoffs
St. Viator Irish (Illinois Intercollegiate Athletic Conference) (1926–1930)
1926	St. Viator	3–5	1–2	15th	
1927	St. Viator	6–2–1	3–1	T–2nd	
1928	St. Viator	3–5	1–3	16th	
1929	St. Viator	0–7–1	0–6–1	T–21st	
1930	St. Viator	3–6	3–5	17th	
St. Viator:		15–25–2	9–17–1		
Total:		15–25–2			

=== Basketball ===
Record table
Season	Team	Overall	Conference	Standing	Postseason
St. Viator Irish (Illinois Intercollegiate Athletic Conference) (1926–1930)
St. Viator:		51–19			
Auburn Tigers (Southern Conference) (1930–1932)
1930–31	Auburn	8–6			
1931–32	Auburn	12–3			
Auburn Tigers (Southeastern Conference) (1932–1933)
1932–33	Auburn	4–9			
Auburn:		24–18			
Florida Gators (Southeastern Conference) (1937–1942)
1937–38	Florida	11–9	3–7	11th	
1938–39	Florida	9–6	5–4	7th	
1939–40	Florida	13–9	5–4	5th	
1940–41	Florida	15–3	6–2	2nd	
1941–42	Florida	8–9	3–8	9th	
Florida Gators (Southeastern Conference) (1946–1951)
1946–47	Florida	17–9	4–4	6th	
1947–48	Florida	15–10	5–7	7th	
1948–49	Florida	11–15	4–8	9th	
1949–50	Florida	9–14	4–10	11th	
1950–51	Florida	11–12	6–8	8th	
Florida:		119–96	45–62		
Total:		194–133			

== Bibliography ==
- McCarthy, Kevin M., Baseball in Florida, Pineapple Press, Inc., Sarasota, Florida (1996). ISBN 1-56164-097-2.
