= Virgil Bingman =

American football/basketball player and coach

Biographical details
- Born: July 22, 1907
- Died: February 3, 1990 (aged 82)
- Education: Southern Illinois

Coaching career (HC unless noted)

Football
- 1941–1942: Defiance

Head coaching record
- Overall: 4–6

Virgil W. Bingman (July 22, 1907 – February 3, 1990) was an American football and basketball player and coach. He served as the head football coach at Defiance College in Defiance, Ohio from 1941 to 1942, compiling a record of 4–6.

Wingman played college basketball at Southern Illinois University Carbondale under head coach William McAndrew.
