= Chick Evans (coach) =

American sports coach and administrator (1901–1976)

Biographical details
- Born: June 18, 1901; Illinois, U.S.
- Died: November 23, 1976 (aged 75); San Diego, California, U.S.
- Education: Des Moines University (1923)

Playing career

Football
- 1918: Illinois
- c. 1920: Des Moines

Coaching career (HC unless noted)

Football
- 1924–1927: Boone HS (IA)
- 1928: DeKalb HS (IL)
- 1929–1954: Northern Illinois State

Basketball
- 1924–1927: Boone HS (IA)
- 1928–1929: DeKalb HS (IL)
- 1929–1940: Northern Illinois State

Baseball
- 1930–1934: Northern Illinois State
- 1937–1944: Northern Illinois State
- 1946–1947: Northern Illinois State

Administrative career (AD unless noted)
- 1929–1968: Northern Illinois State / Northern Illinois

Head coaching record
- Overall: 132–70–20 (college football); 125–93 (college basketball); 118–115–3 (college baseball)
- Bowls: 0–2

Accomplishments and honors

Championships
- Football; 5 IIAC (1938, 1941, 1944, 1946, 1951)

George G. "Chick" Evans (June 18, 1901 – November 23, 1976) was an American football, basketball, and baseball coach and college athletics administrator. He served as the head football coach at Northern Illinois University from 1929 to 1954, compiling a record of 132–70–20. Evans was also the head basketball coach at Northern Illinois from 1929 to 1940, tallying a mark of 125–93, and served three stints at head baseball coach at the school (1930–1934, 1937–1944, 1946–1947), amassing a record of 118–115–3. Evans was the athletic director at Northern Illinois from 1929 to 1968. His 132 wins are the most of any head coach in the Northern Illinois Huskies football program's history.

A native of El Paso, Illinois, Evans attended the University of Illinois, where was a member of the 1918 Illinois Fighting Illini football team led by head coach Robert Zuppke. He then moved on to the now-defunct Des Moines University in Des Moines, Iowa, which was later acquired by the University of Sioux Falls; this should not be confused with the present Des Moines University. At Des Moines, Evans won 11 varsity letters and captained teams in four different sports directed by head coach Harry M. Bell.

Evans began his coaching career at Boone High School in Boone, Iowa, where he spent four years before moving to DeKalb High School in DeKalb, Illinois for one year before becoming head football coach and athletic director of what was then Northern Illinois State Teachers College in 1929. As athletic director and coach, Evans oversaw Northern's growth from a teacher's college to a major university.

Evans later earned a master's degree from Columbia University. He died on November 23, 1976, at Kearney-Mesa Convalesclent Hospital in San Diego, California after a short illness. Evans and his wife, Venus, had moved there following his retirement as athletic director at Northern Illinois in 1968.

Chick Evans Field House, former home of the Huskies basketball team, is named for him.

== Head coaching record ==
=== College football ===
| Year | Team | Overall | Conference | Standing | Bowl/playoffs |
|---|---|---|---|---|---|
Northern Illinois State Teachers/Evansmen/Huskies (Illinois/Interstate Intercollegiate Athletic Conference) (1929–1954)
| 1929 | Northern Illinois State | 6–1–1 | 4–1–1 | T–6th | |
| 1930 | Northern Illinois State | 6–2–1 | 4–1–1 | T–5th | |
| 1931 | Northern Illinois State | 5–3 | 4–2 | T–6th | |
| 1932 | Northern Illinois State | 4–2–1 | 2–2–1 | T–10th | |
| 1933 | Northern Illinois State | 5–4 | 4–3 | 13th | |
| 1934 | Northern Illinois State | 5–1–2 | 4–1–2 | 5th | |
| 1935 | Northern Illinois State | 7–1–1 | 5–1–1 | T–3rd | |
| 1936 | Northern Illinois State | 4–3–1 | 3–2–1 | T–7th | |
| 1937 | Northern Illinois State | 3–2–3 | 3–2–1 | T–9th | |
| 1938 | Northern Illinois State | 6–1–1 | 4–0 | 1st | |
| 1939 | Northern Illinois State | 5–2–1 | 3–1 | 3rd | |
| 1940 | Northern Illinois State | 6–3 | 2–2 | 4th | |
| 1941 | Northern Illinois State | 7–1–1 | 3–1 | T–1st | |
| 1942 | Northern Illinois State | 4–2–2 | 2–0–2 | 2nd | |
| 1943 | Northern Illinois State | 4–1–1 | 1–0 | | |
| 1944 | Northern Illinois State | 7–0 | 3–0 | 1st | |
| 1945 | Northern Illinois State | 4–3 | 2–2 | 3rd | |
| 1946 | Northern Illinois State | 9–2 | 4–0 | 1st | L Turkey Bowl |
| 1947 | Northern Illinois State | 4–3–3 | 2–1–1 | 2nd | L Hoosier Bowl |
| 1948 | Northern Illinois State | 6–4 | 2–2 | 3rd | |
| 1949 | Northern Illinois State | 7–2–1 | 2–1–1 | 2nd | |
| 1950 | Northern Illinois State | 3–6 | 2–4 | 5th | |
| 1951 | Northern Illinois State | 9–0 | 6–0 | 1st | |
| 1952 | Northern Illinois State | 3–6 | 2–4 | T–4th | |
| 1953 | Northern Illinois State | 1–8 | 1–5 | 6th | |
| 1954 | Northern Illinois State | 2–7 | 1–5 | T–6th | |
| Northern Illinois State: | | 132–70–20 | 75–43–12 | | |
| Total: | | 132–70–20 | | | |
National championship Conference title Conference division title or championship game berth
