= William Muir (coach) =

American sports coach (1895–1967)

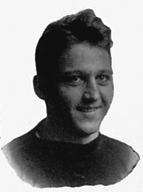
- Muir c. 1916 (left) and c. 1915 (right)

Biographical details
- Born: February 1, 1895; Brock, Nebraska, U.S.
- Died: January 5, 1967 (aged 71); Howard County, Missouri, U.S.

Playing career

Football
- 1915–1916: Missouri
- Position: Guard

Coaching career (HC unless noted)

Football
- 1923–1925: Northern Illinois State

Basketball
- 1923–1926: Northern Illinois State

Baseball
- 1924–1926: Northern Illinois State

Administrative career (AD unless noted)
- 1923–1926: Northern Illinois State

Head coaching record
- Overall: 11–9–3 (football); 24–6 (baseball)

William George Muir (February 1, 1895 – January 5, 1967) was an American football, basketball, and baseball coach. He served as the head football coach at Northern Illinois University from 1923 to 1925, compiling a record of 11–9–3. Muir was also the head basketball coach at Northern Illinois from 1923 to 1926 and the head baseball coach at the school from 1924 to 1926. He graduated from the University of Missouri and also attended coaching school at the University of Illinois. Prior to coming to Northern Illinois, he had taught and coached in Kansas, Texas, and in Decatur, Illinois.

== Head coaching record ==
=== Football ===
Year	Team	Overall	Conference	Standing	Bowl/playoffs
Northern Illinois State Teachers (Illinois Intercollegiate Athletic Conference) (1923–1924)
1923	Northern Illinois State	1–4–3	0–2–3	T–20th	
1924	Northern Illinois State	4–4	1–3	19th	
Northern Illinois State Teachers (Independent) (1925)
1925	Northern Illinois State	6–1			
Northern Illinois State:		11–9–3	1–5–3		
Total:		11–9–3			
