= William McAndrew (coach) =

American sports coach and college athletics administrator (1887–1943)

Biographical details
- Born: April 29, 1887; Lawrence County, Illinois, U.S.
- Died: February 11, 1943 (aged 55); Carbondale, Illinois, U.S.
- Education: Vincennes University

Coaching career (HC unless noted)

Football
- 1913–1916: Southern Illinois
- 1921–1938: Southern Illinois

Basketball
- 1913–1943: Southern Illinois

Baseball
- 1921–1924: Southern Illinois

Administrative career (AD unless noted)
- 1913–1943: Southern Illinois

Head coaching record
- Overall: 83–79–20 (football); 309–221 (basketball)

Accomplishments and honors

Championships
- Football; 1 IIAC (1930)

William McAndrew (April 29, 1887 – February 11, 1943) was an American football, basketball, and baseball coach and college athletics administrator. He served two stints at the head football coach at Southern Illinois University Carbondale, from 1913 to 1916 and then returning from 1921 to 1938, compiling a record of 83–79–20 in 22 seasons. His 83 wins are the most of any head coach in the history of the Southern Illinois Salukis football program. McAndrew was also the head basketball coach at Southern Illinois from 1913 to 1943, tallying a mark of 309–221, and the school head baseball coach from 1921 to 1924.

McAndrew was an alumnus of Vincennes University where he was a member of Sigma Pi fraternity. He also played professionally in the Central League before becoming a coach and teacher.

McAndrew Stadium on the Southern Illinois campus was named for him in 1943.

McAndrew was born in Lawrenceville, Illinois, and served as a captain in the United States Army during World War I. After the war he stayed in the National Guard and rose to the rank of brigadier general. He was a coach for the Lawrenceville Township High School until taking the job at SIU. When he died he was the commanding officer of the Third Brigade of the Illinois National Guard. He died on February 11, 1943, in Carbondale, Illinois.

== Head coaching record ==
=== College football ===
Year	Team	Overall	Conference	Standing	Bowl/playoffs
Southern Illinois Maroons (Illinois Intercollegiate Athletic Conference) (1913–1916)
1913	Southern Illinois	4–2–1			
1914	Southern Illinois	4–4			
1915	Southern Illinois	5–3			
1916	Southern Illinois	3–4			
Southern Illinois Maroons (Illinois Intercollegiate Athletic Conference) (1921–1938)
1921	Southern Illinois	2–2–3			
1922	Southern Illinois	1–6	0–3		
1923	Southern Illinois	3–2–2	2–1	T–6th	
1924	Southern Illinois	6–2	1–2	T–16th	
1925	Southern Illinois	0–5–1	0–2	T–21st	
1926	Southern Illinois	5–1–2	1–1–1	T–10th	
1927	Southern Illinois	3–5–2	2–1	T–7th	
1928	Southern Illinois	7–1–2	3–1	6th	
1929	Southern Illinois	5–3–1	4–2	T–8th	
1930	Southern Illinois	9–0	5–0	T–1st	
1931	Southern Illinois	7–2	4–2	T–6th	
1932	Southern Illinois	2–5–3	1–4–1	17th	
1933	Southern Illinois	4–4–1	4–2	T–10th	
1934	Southern Illinois	5–3	5–1	T–3rd	
1935	Southern Illinois	1–7–1	1–4–1	15th	
1936	Southern Illinois	3–4–1	3–2–1	T–7th	
1937	Southern Illinois	2–7	2–4	T–16th	
1938	Southern Illinois	2–7	0–4	T–7th	
Southern Illinois:		83–79–20			
Total:		83–79–20			
National championship Conference title Conference division title or championship game berth
