= 1943 Northern Illinois State Huskies football team =

American college football season

1943 Northern Illinois State Huskies football
- Conference: Illinois Intercollegiate Athletic Conference
- Record: 4–1–1 (1–0 IIAC)
- Head coach: Chick Evans (15th season)
- Captains: Sievert Block; Wayne Cook
- Home stadium: Glidden Field

1943 Illinois Intercollegiate Athletic Conference football standings
	Conf.					Overall
Team	W		L		T	W		L		T
Northern Illinois State	1	–	0	–	0	4	–	1	–	1
Illinois State Normal	1	–	0	–	0	6	–	2	–	1
Western Illinois	0	–	2	–	0	1	–	6	–	0
Eastern Illinois	0	–	0	–	0	0	–	0	–	0
Southern Illinois	0	–	0	–	0	0	–	0	–	0

The 1943 Northern Illinois State Huskies football team represented Northern Illinois State Teachers College—now known as Northern Illinois University—as a member of the Illinois Intercollegiate Athletic Conference (IIAC) during the 1943 college football season. Led by 15th-year head coach Chick Evans, the Huskies compiled an overall record of 4–1–1 with a mark of 1–0 in conference play. The team played home games at the 5,500-seat Glidden Field, located on the east end of campus, in DeKalb, Illinois.

== Schedule ==
Date	Opponent	Site	Result	Source
October 9	Wheaton (IL)*^{†}	Glidden Field; DeKalb, IL	T 0–0	
October 16	at Western Illinois	Macomb, IL	W 33–14	
October 23	Wilson JC*	Glidden Field; DeKalb, IL	W 39–12	
October 30	at Wheaton (IL)*	Wheaton, IL	L 13–20	
November 6	Concordia (IL)*	Glidden Field; DeKalb, IL	W 12–0	
November 13	Elmhurst	Glidden Field; DeKalb, IL	W 20–7	
*Non-conference game; ^{†}Homecoming
