= Bradley Braves football =

- First season: 1897; 129 years ago
- Last season: 1970; 56 years ago
- Location: Peoria, Illinois
- Stadium: Peoria Stadium
- Colors: Red and white
- All-time record: 308–240–32 (.559)

Conference championships
- 6

The Bradley Braves football program represented Bradley University in college football. The school, known as Bradley Polytechnic Institute until 1946, began its football program in 1897, the year the school was founded. With exception of an interruption during World War II (1943–1945), Bradley fielded a football team every year until 1970. The team was known as the Indians until the 1930s. Bradley played its home games at Peoria Stadium in Peoria, Illinois.
