= Mount Morris College =

Former educational institution

Coordinates: 42°2′51.9″N 89°26′3.8″W

Mount Morris College was a religious college affiliated with the Church of the Brethren in Mount Morris, Illinois, USA. The original institution at this location was Rock River Seminary, which was founded by the Methodist Church in 1839. The Methodists closed Rock River Seminary in 1878 and subsequently sold the seminary grounds and buildings to the Church of the Brethren. The Brethren reorganized the school and reopened it in 1879 as Mount Morris Seminary and Collegiate Institute. It officially became Mount Morris College in 1884.

Although the college initially attracted enough students to be successful, luck was never with it. A fire on the campus in January 1912 burned one of the college's main buildings to the ground. Diligent fundraising allowed the campus to continue, and a new building was constructed to replace what was lost. However, by the end of World War I, enrollments began to decline, and financial problems continued to plague the college. Enrollments began to rise again in 1929–1930, but another fire in April 1932 destroyed a dormitory and heavily damaged some classroom and administrative buildings. The financial strain of this second fire, coming during the worst years of the Great Depression was too much. At the end of the school year, in May 1932, Mount Morris College closed forever.

Mount Morris College was a member of the Illinois Intercollegiate Athletic Conference from 1922 to 1931.

== Notable alumni ==
Notable alumni of Mount Morris College include:

- Adaline Hohf Beery (1859–1929), American author, newspaper editor, songbook compiler, hymnwriter
- Aaron Brumbaugh, sixth president of Shimer College and a leading figure in the Hutchins Great Books movement
- Florence King, the first female patent attorney in America
- Emery Myers Emmert (1900–1962), Class of 1923. Professor of Horticulture at University of Kentucky 1928–1962, inventor of the plastic greenhouse.
- Henry C. Newcomer, Brigadier General, 1861–1952, Assistant Director of Chemical Warfare Section 1918–1919.

Notable alumni from the Methodist Rock River Seminary include:

- Smith D. Atkins, author, editor, and Civil War commander
- John Lourie Beveridge, Governor of Illinois
- Emelie C. S. Chilton (1838–1864), author, editor
- Shelby Moore Cullom, United States Senator
- Charles Henry Fowler, Bishop of the Methodist Episcopal Church
- S. M. I. Henry (1839–1900), evangelist, temperance reformer, poet, author
- James B. Herrick, physician and first describer of sickle-cell disease
- Robert R. Hitt, US Congressman
- Daniel Harris Johnson, Wisconsin State Assemblyman
- W.H.L. Wallace, Civil War Brigadier General, Hero of the Battle of Shiloh
