= McKendree Bearcats =

- University: McKendree University
- Nickname: Bearcats
- NCAA: Division II
- Conference: GLVC (primary); MIVA (men's volleyball); WWPA (men's and women's water polo)
- Athletic director: Anthony Francis
- Location: Lebanon, Illinois
- Varsity teams: 39 (18 men's and 18 women's and 3 co-ed)
- Football stadium: Leemon Field
- Basketball arena: Melvin Price Convocation Center
- Baseball stadium: Hypes Field
- Colors: Purple and white
- Mascot: Bogie
- Website: mckbearcats.com
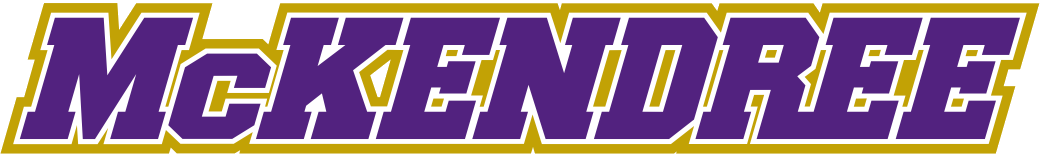

The McKendree Bearcats are the intercollegiate athletic programs that represent McKendree University, located in Lebanon, Illinois, United States. They are a member of the NCAA Division II ranks, primarily competing in the Great Lakes Valley Conference (GLVC); achieving D-II full member status in the 2013–14 academic year.

Prior to joining the NCAA, the Bearcats previously competed in the National Association of Intercollegiate Athletics (NAIA) as members of the American Midwest Conference (with the exception of football where they played in the Midwest League of the Mid-States Football Association (MSFA) from 1987–88 to 2010–11, as well as an NAIA/NCAA Division II Independent during the 2011–12 school year. They also competed in the Illinois Intercollegiate Athletic Conference (IIAC) from 1912–13 to 1937–38.

In addition to GLVC-sponsored sports, McKendree also fields NCAA-sanctioned teams in three sports at the National Collegiate level, that being the NCAA's standard term for championships open to members of more than one division. In women's bowling, McKendree competes as an independent. The bowling championship is open to members of all divisions through 2026–27, after which a separate Division II championship will be established. Men's volleyball, whose championship is open to members of Divisions I and II, competes in the Midwestern Intercollegiate Volleyball Association (MIVA), remaining in that conference despite the GLVC launching its own men's volleyball league in 2025–26. The women's bowling team won the NCAA National Collegiate Bowling Championship in 2017 and 2022. They were runner-up in the 2018 event. The Bearcats won the first official NCAA women's wrestling championship, also a National Collegiate sport (in this case, open to all NCAA members), in 2026.

The school also fields teams outside of the NCAA structure in two NCAA-sponsored sports and four non-NCAA sports. In the NCAA sports of men's ice hockey and women's lacrosse, McKendree is respectively a member of the ACHA Division II in the Mid-American Collegiate Hockey Association (MACHA) and the Western Intercollegiate Lacrosse Association (WILA). The non-NCAA sports sponsored by McKendree are men's bowling, men's and women's powerlifting, and co-ed bass fishing.

== Move to NCAA Division II ==
On July 12, 2010, the university was informed by the NCAA Division II Membership Committee that it was accepted into the NCAA Division II. McKendree continued to play in the NAIA during the two-year candidacy period, before it became a member of the GLVC during the provisional year. The fourth academic year, 2013–2014, the NCAA would vote to make McKendree an active member of NCAA D-II.

On October 6, 2010, it was announced that McKendree University received and accepted an invitation to the GLVC. The Bearcats became the 17th member of the GLVC in 2012. The university is now eligible for all conference and NCAA championships.

== Varsity teams ==
McKendree competes in 39 intercollegiate varsity sports: Men's sports include baseball, basketball, bowling, cross country, football, golf, ice hockey, powerlifting, rugby, soccer, swimming & diving, tennis, track & field, volleyball, water polo and wrestling; while women's sports include basketball, beach volleyball, bowling, cross country, golf, ice hockey, lacrosse, powerlifting, rugby, soccer, softball, swimming & diving, tennis, track & field, volleyball, water polo and wrestling; and co-ed sports include bass fishing, cheerleading and dance.

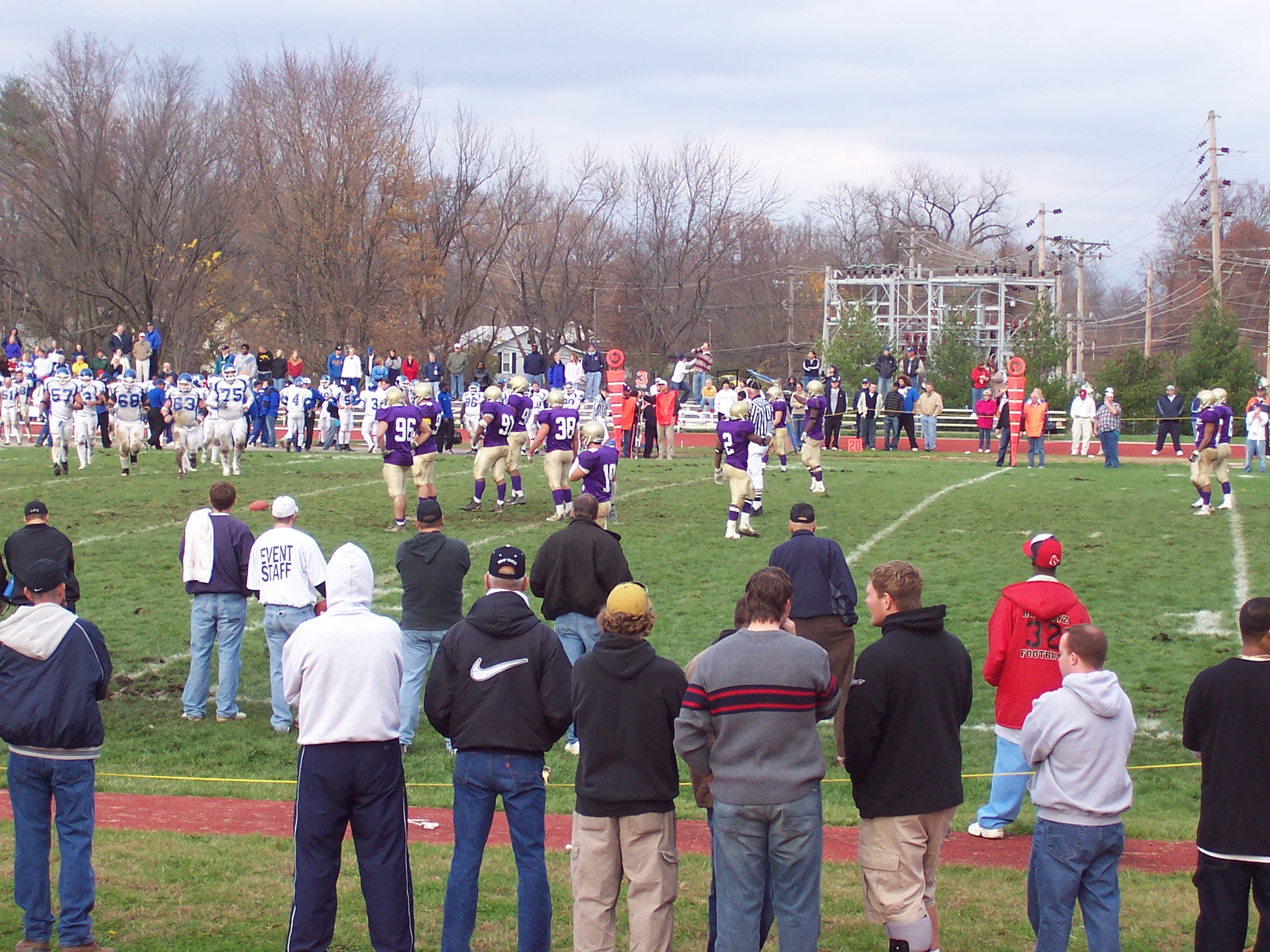
McKendree football game in 2009

Men's sports	Women's sports
Baseball	Basketball
Basketball	Beach Volleyball
Bowling	Bowling
Cross country	Cross country
Football	Golf
Golf	Ice Hockey (Note: Affiliated to the American Collegiate Hockey Association ("ACHA").)
Ice Hockey	Lacrosse
Powerlifting	Powerlifting
Rugby	Rugby
Soccer	Soccer
Swimming and diving	Softball
Tennis	Swimming and diving
Track and Field^{1}	Tennis
Volleyball	Track and Field^{1}
Water Polo	Volleyball
Wrestling	Water Polo
	Wrestling
Co-ed sports
Bass Fishing
Cheerleading
Dance
^{1} – includes both indoor and outdoor

=== Men's basketball ===
McKendree's men's former basketball coach, Harry Statham, at one point held the all-time record for wins at a four-year institution. On February 16, 2019, this record was broken by Duke University head coach Mike Krzyzewski. Statham's 1,122 wins during his 52 seasons at McKendree were previously unmatched by any other basketball coach at a four-year college or university in the United States.

=== Bowling ===
The McKendree University bowling team is headed by Shannon and Bryan O'Keefe. Shannon played softball up through high school and won the All-American award as a center fielder. She went to Portland State University and began to input herself in the amateur status. Bryan went to University of Nebraska and took many coaching classes. Shannon has been on bowling's Team USA for 15 years, and has won over 20 professional titles, including 14 on the PWBA Tour. Bryan was never much of a professional bowler, however was very passionate about coaching, and because of that landed himself a place in the Bowling Hall of Fame as one of the top coaches of the decade. Since their placement at McKendree University the bowling teams, together, have increased their overall average by 12 pins. They came to McKendree in the 2014–2015 school year to coach the men and women's programs. Under their supervision the men and women both went to the National Collegiate Bowling Competition. The women placed fifth and the men placed sixth. The 2016 men's team won the USBC national championship while the women's team won the 2017 NCAA National Championship, sweeping perennial powerhouse Nebraska 4–0 on April 15, 2017. A month later, the women's team also won the 2017 USBC Intercollegiate Team Championships held in Baton Rouge, Louisiana, completing a sweep of the two major college competitions. On April 16, 2022, the women's team won its second national championship, sweeping Stephen F. Austin 4–0 in the 2022 NCAA Bowling Championships.

== National championships ==
=== Team ===
Sport	Association	Division	Year	Opponent/Runner-up	Score
Men's indoor track and field (1)	NAIA	Single	2001	Azusa Pacific	59–48.5
Women's indoor track and field (4)	NAIA	Single	1999	Mary (ND)	96–64
Women's indoor track and field (4)	NAIA	Single	2000	Life	125–113
Women's indoor track and field (4)	NAIA	Single	2001	Life	66–64
Women's indoor track and field (4)	NAIA	Single	2002	Azusa Pacific	77–75
Women's outdoor track and field (1)	NAIA	Single	1999	Life	127–72 (+55)
Women's bowling (2)	NCAA	Single	2017	Nebraska	4–3 (best-of-seven final)
Women's bowling (2)	NCAA	Single	2022	Stephen F. Austin	4–0 (best-of-seven final)
Women's wrestling (1)	NCAA	Single	2026	Iowa	171–166 (+5)
