= St. Viator College =

Catholic liberal arts college in Illinois

- Type: Private
- Active: 1868–1938
- Affiliations: Catholic
- Students: 300
- Location: Bourbonnais, Illinois, U.S. 41.1536°N 87.8761°W
- Campus: Rural
- Sporting affiliations: Illinois Intercollegiate Athletic Conference

St. Viator College was a Catholic liberal arts college in Bourbonnais, Illinois, United States. It is no longer in operation. Today, the site is home to Olivet Nazarene University.

== History ==
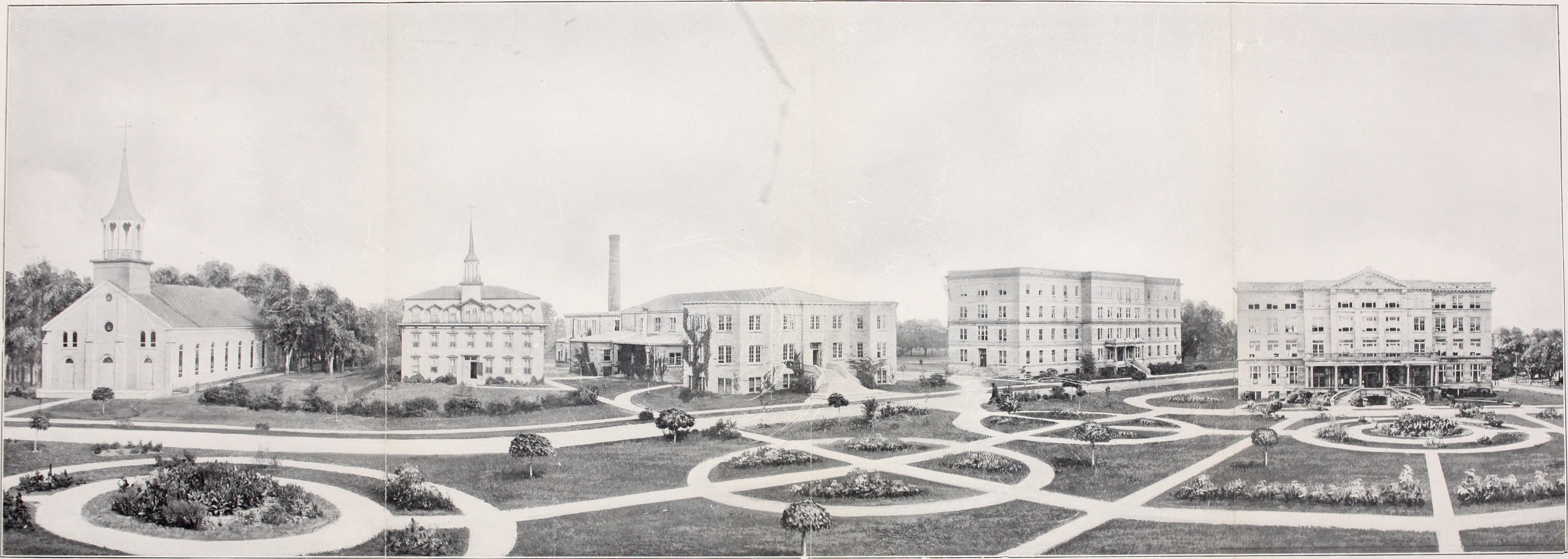
St. Viator College in 1920

St. Viator's grew out of the original Bourbonnais village school, founded in 1865 by the Viatorians, to an academy for boys with the help of Father P. Beaudoin and Brothers Martel and Bernard. On September 6, 1868 it became a four-year liberal arts college with the aid of Father Thomas Roy. After nine years of work, Father Roy returned to his home in Canada, and was succeeded by Father M. J. Marsile, who oversaw the college for another 25 years. In 1906, several buildings were destroyed by fire, but courses continued in improvised quarters and new buildings were erected. Father Marsile afterward resigned, and Reverend John Patrick O'Mahoney was appointed president. Under financial pressure, the college closed in 1938.

== Campus ==
Roy Memorial Chapel was named for Father Thomas Roy, who served as president of the college. Marsile Alumni Hall was named in honour of Father M. J. Marsile, who was college president for 25 years. After St. Viator's closed in 1938, the campus was purchased by Olivet Nazarene College from Olivet, Illinois. Four buildings on the Olivet Nazarene campus are original from the days of St. Viator's 39-acre campus.

== Academics ==
St. Viator College had a preparatory department and high school in addition to the college and seminary and, for most of its years, had an enrollment of over 300 students.

== Student life ==
During its existence, St. Viator was the host of the Catholic State Basketball Tournament for Illinois. St. Viator College was a member of the Illinois Intercollegiate Athletic Conference from 1916 to 1938.

== Notable persons ==
Many of the college's graduates were priests, but even more entered the professions of law and medicine.

SHEEN, F.J. REVEREND, BA 1917

Notable alumni included:

- Jack Berch, popular singer and personality on four networks during the Golden Age of Radio.
- John Tracy Ellis,
- Sam J. McAllister,
- Fulton J. Sheen,
- G. Raymond Sprague,
- Bernard James Sheil.
- Joseph James Smith, youngest son of the notorious gangster and con artist "Soapy" Smith.

== See also ==
- Clerics of St. Viator
- Johnson, Vic and the Bourbonnais Grove Historical Society. 2006. Bourbonnais, Charleston, SC: Arcadia Pub.
