= Interstate Intercollegiate Athletic Conference =

Sports league

- Formerly: Illinois Intercollegiate Athletic Conference
- Conference: NCAA
- Founded: 1908
- Folded: 1970
- Division: College Division (Small College)
- No. of teams: 8 (start), 4 (final), 29 (total)
- Region: Midwest

The Interstate Intercollegiate Athletic Conference (IIAC) was a college athletic conference that existed from 1908 to 1970 in the United States.

At one time the Illinois Intercollegiate Athletic Conference, or IIAC, was a robust league that claimed most of the Illinois institutions of higher education. It was nicknamed the "Little Nineteen," but in 1928 had a membership of 23 schools. Former Illinois State University track coach Joseph Cogdal, associated with the IIAC for 43 years of its 62-year history, noted that the league had roots in the 1870s when a number of schools banded together for oratorical contests. Their first intercollegiate football game was played in 1881 between Illinois State University and Knox College, and by 1894 a football association was established.

== History ==
The IIAC was formed in April 1908 with eight charter members: Bradley Polytechnic Institute (now Bradley University), Illinois College, Illinois State Normal University (now Illinois State University), Illinois Wesleyan University, Knox College, Lombard College, Millikin University and Monmouth College. The first track meet was held on May 22, 1908. The group quickly expanded. Eastern Illinois State Teachers College (now Eastern Illinois University) and Western Illinois University joined in 1912 and 1914 respectively.

In 1920, the name "Illinois Intercollegiate Athletic Conference" was adopted, providing the initials IIAC. Conference membership reached a peak of 23 member schools in 1928, when virtually all of the small colleges in Illinois were included.

Private schools withdrew during much of the 1930s, until in 1942 only the five state schools remained: Eastern Illinois University, Illinois State University, Northern Illinois University, Southern Illinois University Carbondale and Western Illinois University. In 1950, the league name became the Interstate Intercollegiate Athletic Conference, when Central Michigan University and Eastern Michigan University brought the membership to seven. In 1961-62, Eastern Michigan University and Southern Illinois University Carbondale withdrew; Northern Illinois University followed in 1965-66. The conference disbanded at the end of the 1969–70 academic year.

== Member schools ==
Interstate Intercollegiate Athletic Conference members (clickable map)

=== Final members ===
Institution	Location	Founded	Affiliation	Enrollment	Nickname	Joined	Left	Current conference	Current association
Central Michigan University	Mount Pleasant, Michigan	1892	Public	21,705	Chippewas	1950–51	1969–70	Mid-American (MAC)	Division I
Eastern Illinois University	Charleston, Illinois	1895	Public	8,626	Panthers	1912–13	1969–70	Ohio Valley (OVC)	Division I
Illinois State University	Normal, Illinois	1857	Public	20,706	Redbirds	1908–09	1969–70	Missouri Valley (MVC)	Division I
Western Illinois University	Macomb, Illinois	1899	Public	7,624	Leathernecks	1914–15	1969–70	Ohio Valley (OVC)	Division I

=== Former members ===
Institution	Location	Founded	Affiliation	Enrollment	Nickname	Joined	Left	Current conference	Current association
Augustana College	Rock Island, Illinois	1860	Private	2,513	Vikings	1912–13	1936–37	Illinois–Wisconsin (CCIW)	Division III
Blackburn College	Carlinville, Illinois	1837	Private	590	Beavers	1914–15	1922–23	St. Louis (SLIAC)	Division III
Bradley University	Peoria, Illinois	1897	Private	5,451	Braves	1908–09	1936–37	Missouri Valley (MVC)	Division I
Carthage College	Carthage, Illinois	1847	Private	2,374	Redmen (Note: Carthage changed its nickname from Redmen to Firebirds in 2021.)	1912–13	1940–41	Illinois–Wisconsin (CCIW)	Division III
Eastern Michigan University	Ypsilanti, Michigan	1849	Public	18,838	Hurons (Note: Eastern Michigan changed its nickname from Hurons to Eagles in 1991.)	1950–51	1961–62	Mid-American (MAC)	Division I
Elmhurst College (Note: Currently known as Elmhurst University since 2020.)	Elmhurst, Illinois	1871	Private	2,748	Pirates (Note: Elmhurst changed its nickname from Pirates to Bluejays in 2000.)	1929–30	1940–41	Illinois–Wisconsin (CCIW)	Division III
Eureka College	Eureka, Illinois	1855	Private	680	Red Devils	1910–11	1941–42	St. Louis (SLIAC)	Division III
Hedding College (Note: Defunct institution.)	Abingdon, Illinois	1855	Private	N/A	Orangemen	1910–11	1925–26	N/A	N/A
Illinois College	Jacksonville, Illinois	1829	Private	1,105	Blueboys & Lady Blues	1908–09	1936–37	Midwest (MWC)	Division III
Illinois Wesleyan University	Bloomington, Illinois	1850	Private	2,113	Titans	1908–09	1936–37	Illinois–Wisconsin (CCIW)	Division III
Knox College	Galesburg, Illinois	1837	Private	1,399	Prairie Fire	1908–09	1936–37	Midwest (MWC)	Division III
Lake Forest College	Lake Forest, Illinois	1857	Private	1,395	Foresters	1919–20	1936–37	Midwest (MWC)	Division III
Lincoln College	Lincoln, Illinois	1865	Private	800	Lynx	1910–11	1927–28	N/A	N/A
Lombard College	Galesburg, Illinois	1853	Private	N/A	Golden Tornado, Olive	1908–09	1928–29	N/A	N/A
McKendree College (Note: Currently known as McKendree University since 2007.)	Lebanon, Illinois	1828	Private	1,702	Bearcats	1912–13	1937–38	Great Lakes Valley (GLVC)	Division II
Millikin University	Decatur, Illinois	1901	Private	2,118	Big Blue	1908–09	1936–37	Illinois–Wisconsin (CCIW)	Division III
Monmouth College	Monmouth, Illinois	1853	Private	1,300	Fighting Scots	1908–09	1936–37	Midwest (MWC)	Division III
Mount Morris College	Mount Morris, Illinois	1839	Private	N/A	Mountaineers, Mounders	1922–23	1930–31	N/A	N/A
North Central College	Naperville, Illinois	1861	Private	2,490	Cardinals	1927–28	1936–37	Illinois–Wisconsin (CCIW)	Division III
Northern Illinois University	DeKalb, Illinois	1895	Public	17,169	Huskies	1920–21	1965–66	Mid-American (MAC)	Division I
Shurtleff College	Alton, Illinois	1827	Private	N/A	Pioneers, Bison	1910–11	1936–37	N/A	N/A
Southern Illinois University Carbondale	Carbondale, Illinois	1869	Public	11,695	Maroons, Salukis	1913–14	1961–62	Missouri Valley (MVC)	Division I
St. Viator College	Bourbonnais, Illinois	1865	Private	N/A	Irish, Green	1916–17	1937–38	N/A	N/A
Wheaton College	Wheaton, Illinois	1860	Private	2,282	Crusaders (Note: Wheaton changed its nickname from Crusaders to Thunder in 2000.)	1919–20	1936–37	Illinois–Wisconsin (CCIW)	Division III
William & Vashti College	Aledo, Illinois	1908	Private	N/A	unknown	1910–11	1916–17	N/A	N/A

== Football champions ==
=== Illinois Intercollegiate Athletic Conference ===
- 1910 – Illinois Wesleyan
- 1911 – Millikin
- 1912 – Carthage, Eastern Illinois, and William & Vashti
- 1913 – Eastern Illinois and William & Vashti
- 1914 – Eastern Illinois
- 1915 – Illinois College
- 1916 – Millikin
- 1917 – Lombard (IL)
- 1918 – No champion
- 1919 – Millikin
- 1920 – Millikin, North Central, and Wheaton
- 1921 – Lombard
- 1922 – Lombard
- 1923 – Lombard
- 1924 – Knox (IL) and Lombard
- 1925 – Bradley and Monmouth (IL)
- 1926 – Bradley and Monmouth (IL)
- 1927 – Bradley
- 1928 – Eastern Illinois and Millikin
- 1929 – Knox (IL) and Lombard
- 1930 – Millikin, Mount Morris, and Southern Illinois
- 1931 – Monmouth (IL)
- 1932 – Illinois Wesleyan and McKendree
- 1933 – Illinois Wesleyan
- 1934 – Augustana (IL) and Millikin
- 1935 – Millikin and Monmouth (IL)
- 1936 – Illinois Wesleyan and St. Viator
- 1937 – Bradley, Illinois College, and Illinois State Normal
- 1938 – Northern Illinois State
- 1939 – Western Illinois
- 1940 – Illinois State Normal
- 1941 – Illinois State Normal and Northern Illinois State
- 1942 – Western Illinois
- 1943 – No champion
- 1944 – Northern Illinois State
- 1945 – Illinois State Normal
- 1946 – Northern Illinois State
- 1947 – Southern Illinois
- 1948 – Western Illinois
- 1949 – Western Illinois

=== Interstate Intercollegiate Athletic Conference ===
- 1950 – Illinois State Normal
- 1951 – Northern Illinois State
- 1952 – Central Michigan
- 1953 – Central Michigan
- 1954 – Central Michigan and Michigan State Normal
- 1955 – Central Michigan and Michigan State Normal
- 1956 – Central Michigan
- 1957 – Eastern Michigan
- 1958 – Western Illinois
- 1959 – Western Illinois
- 1960 – Southern Illinois
- 1961 – Southern Illinois
- 1962 – Central Michigan
- 1963 – Northern Illinois
- 1964 – Northern Illinois and Western Illinois
- 1965 – Northern Illinois
- 1966 – Central Michigan
- 1967 – Central Michigan and Illinois State
- 1968 – Central Michigan and Illinois State
- 1969 – Western Illinois

== See also ==
- List of defunct college football conferences
- List of Interstate Intercollegiate Athletic Conference football standings
- Mid-American Conference
- Missouri Valley Football Conference
- Ohio Valley Conference
- College Conference of Illinois and Wisconsin
