= Northern Illinois Huskies football statistical leaders =

Logo of the Northern Illinois Huskies football team.

The Northern Illinois Huskies football statistical leaders are individual statistical leaders of the Northern Illinois Huskies football program in various categories, including passing, rushing, receiving, total offense, defensive stats, and kicking. Within those areas, the lists identify single-game, single-season, and career leaders. The Huskies currently represent Northern Illinois University in the NCAA Division I FBS Mountain West Conference.

Although Northern Illinois began competing in intercollegiate football in 1899, the school's official record book does not generally include statistics from earlier than the 1950s, as records before this period are often incomplete and inconsistent.

These lists are dominated by more recent players for several reasons:

- Since the 1950s, seasons have increased from 10 games to 11 and then 12 games in length.
- The NCAA didn't allow freshmen to play varsity football until 1972 (with the exception of the World War II years), allowing players to have four-year careers.
- Bowl games only began counting toward single-season and career statistics in 2002. The Huskies have played in 12 bowl games since then, giving recent players an extra chance to accumulate statistics. Similarly, the Huskies have played in the MAC Championship Game seven times since 2005, meaning many recent seasons included 14 games.
- The Huskies' 11 highest seasons in total offensive yardage have come since 2000, with the seven highest seasons being 2010 through 2016.

These lists are updated through the end of the 2025 season.

== Passing ==
=== Passing yards ===
Career
Rank	Player	Yards	Years
1	Chandler Harnish	8,944	2008 2009 2010 2011
2	George Bork	6,782	1960 1961 1962 1963
3	Chris Finlen	6,551	1997 1999 2000 2001
4	Jordan Lynch	6,209	2010 2011 2012 2013
5	Josh Haldi	6,015	2001 2002 2003 2004
6	Rocky Lombardi	5,516	2021 2022 2023
7	Phil Horvath	4,887	2004 2005 2006
8	Drew Hare	4,862	2013 2014 2015 2016
9	Marcus Childers	4,323	2017 2018 2019
10	Marshall Taylor	4,167	1985 1986 1987 1988

Single season
Rank	Player	Yards	Year
1	Chandler Harnish	3,216	2011
2	Jordan Lynch	3,138	2012
3	George Bork	3,077	1963
4	Jordan Lynch	2,892	2013
5	Rocky Lombardi	2,597	2021
6	Josh Haldi	2,544	2003
7	Chandler Harnish	2,530	2010
8	George Bork	2,506	1962
9	Drew Hare	2,322	2014
10	Rocky Lombardi	2,274	2023

Single game
Rank	Player	Yards	Year	Opponent
1	Rocky Lombardi	532	2021	Kent State
2	Phil Horvath	486	2005	Akron
3	George Bork	445	1963	Illinois State
4	George Bork	435	1962	Illinois State
5	George Bork	416	1963	UW-Whitewater
6	Jordan Lynch	407	2012	Toledo
7	George Bork	389	1963	Winona State
8	Chandler Harnish	370	2011	Central Michigan
9	Drew Hare	363	2015	Ball State
10	Drew Hare	360	2015	UNLV

=== Passing touchdowns ===
Career
Rank	Player	TDs	Years
1	Chandler Harnish	68	2008 2009 2010 2011
2	George Bork	60	1960 1961 1962 1963
3	Josh Haldi	55	2001 2002 2003 2004
4	Jordan Lynch	51	2010 2011 2012 2013
5	Chris Finlen	42	1997 1999 2000 2001
6	Bob Heimerdinger	38	1948 1949 1950 1951
7	Drew Hare	37	2013 2014 2015 2016
	Marcus Childers	37	2017 2018 2019
9	Ron Christian	36	1963 1964 1965
10	Lew Flinn	35	1957 1958 1959
	Phil Horvath	35	2004 2005 2006

Single season
Rank	Player	TDs	Year
1	George Bork	32	1963
2	Chandler Harnish	28	2011
3	Josh Haldi	25	2003
	Jordan Lynch	25	2012
5	Jordan Lynch	24	2013
6	Ron Christian	23	1965
7	George Bork	22	1962
8	Chandler Harnish	21	2010
9	Lew Flinn	18	1959
	Mike Griesman	18	1966
	Phil Horvath	18	2005
	Drew Hare	18	2014

Single game
Rank	Player	TDs	Year	Opponent
1	George Bork	7	1963	UW-Whitewater
2	Bob Heimerdinger	6	1951	Illinois State
	Josh Haldi	6	2004	Western Michigan
	Phil Horvath	6	2005	Akron
	Chandler Harnish	6	2011	Toledo
6	Scott Crabtree	5	1993	Nevada
	Chandler Harnish	5	2011	Army
	Ethan Hampton	5	2024	Western Illinois

== Rushing ==
=== Rushing yards ===
Career
Rank	Player	Yards	Years
1	Garrett Wolfe	5,164	2004 2005 2006
2	Michael Turner	4,941	2000 2001 2002 2003
3	Jordan Lynch	4,343	2010 2011 2012 2013
4	Mark Kellar	3,745	1971 1972 1973
5	Allen Ross	3,500	1977 1978 1979 1980
6	Adam Dach	3,438	1987 1988 1989 1990 1991
7	LeShon Johnson	3,314	1992 1993
8	Charles Talley	3,155	1993 1994 1995 1996
9	Antario Brown	3,090	2021 2022 2023 2024
10	Chandler Harnish	2,983	2008 2009 2010 2011

Single season
Rank	Player	Yards	Year
1	LeShon Johnson	1,976	1993
2	Garrett Wolfe	1,928	2006
3	Jordan Lynch	1,920	2013
4	Michael Turner	1,915	2002
5	Jordan Lynch	1,815	2012
6	Mark Kellar	1,719	1973
7	Garrett Wolfe	1,656	2004
8	Michael Turner	1,648	2003
9	Garrett Wolfe	1,580	2005
10	Charles Talley	1,540	1995

Single game
Rank	Player	Yards	Year	Opponent
1	Garrett Wolfe	353	2006	Ball State
2	Garrett Wolfe	325	2004	Eastern Michigan
3	LeShon Johnson	322	1993	Southern Illinois
4	Jordan Lynch	321	2013	Western Michigan
5	Jordan Lynch	316	2013	Central Michigan
6	Stacey Robinson	308	1990	Fresno State
7	LeShon Johnson	306	1993	Iowa
8	Michael Turner	282	2002	Western Illinois
9	Stacey Robinson	281	1989	Cincinnati
	Michael Turner	281	2000	Central Michigan

=== Rushing touchdowns ===
Career
Rank	Player	TDs	Years
1	Garrett Wolfe	52	2004 2005 2006
2	Chad Spann	49	2007 2008 2009 2010
3	Jordan Lynch	48	2010 2011 2012 2013
4	Michael Turner	43	2000 2001 2002 2003
5	Stacey Robinson	38	1988 1989 1990
6	Mark Kellar	32	1971 1972 1973
7	Joel Bouagnon	31	2013 2014 2015 2016
8	Allen Ross	30	1977 1978 1979 1980
9	Charles Talley	27	1993 1994 1995 1996
10	Antario Brown	26	2021 2022 2023 2024

Single season
Rank	Player	TDs	Year
1	Jordan Lynch	23	2013
2	Chad Spann	22	2010
3	Stacey Robinson	19	1989
	Stacey Robinson	19	1990
	Michael Turner	19	2002
	Chad Spann	19	2009
	Jordan Lynch	19	2012
8	Garrett Wolfe	18	2004
	Garrett Wolfe	18	2006
	Joel Bouagnon	18	2015

Single game
Rank	Player	TDs	Year	Opponent
1	Bill Anderson	7	1912	Wheaton
2	Navarre Edwards	5	1909	Dixon
	Steve Goehl	5	1971	Long Beach State
	Stacey Robinson	5	1989	Cincinnati
	Stacey Robinson	5	1990	Fresno State
	Thomas Hammock	5	2000	Akron
	Michael Turner	5	2002	Miami (Ohio)
	Michael Turner	5	2002	Eastern Michigan
	Garrett Wolfe	5	2005	Western Michigan
	Joel Bouagnon	5	2016	Bowling Green

== Receiving ==
=== Receptions ===
Career
Rank	Player	Rec	Years
1	Justin McCareins	204	1997 1998 1999 2000
2	Hugh Rohrschneider	183	1960 1961 1962 1963
3	P. J. Fleck	179	1999 2000 2001 2002
4	Martel Moore	178	2009 2010 2011 2012
5	Tommylee Lewis	172	2011 2012 2013 2014 2015
6	Kenny Golladay	160	2015 2016
7	Da'Ron Brown	155	2011 2012 2013 2014
	Cole Tucker	155	2018 2019 2020 2021 2022
9	Trayvon Rudolph	153	2020 2021 2023 2024
10	Dave Petzke	148	1977 1978

Single season
Rank	Player	Yards	Year
1	Dave Petzke	91	1978
2	Kenny Golladay	87	2016
3	Tommylee Lewis	86	2013
4	P. J. Fleck	77	2003
5	Hugh Rohrschneider	76	1962
6	Hugh Rohrschneider	75	1963
	Martel Moore	75	2012
8	Kenny Golladay	73	2015
9	Da'Ron Brown	68	2014
10	Justin McCareins	66	2000

Single game
Rank	Player	Rec	Year	Opponent
1	Gary Stearns	17	1963	Central Michigan
2	P. J. Fleck	14	2003	Ohio
	Sam Hurd	14	2005	Akron
	Kenny Golladay	14	2016	Toledo
	Trayvon Rudolph	14	2021	Kent State
6	Gary Stearns	13	1963	Illinois State
	P. J. Fleck	13	2003	Maryland
	Kenny Golladay	13	2016	Ball State
9	Sam Hurd	12	2005	Central Michigan
	Justin McCareins	12	1998	Western Michigan
	Dave Petzke	12	1978	Toledo
	Willie Hatter	12	1971	Western Michigan
	Tommylee Lewis	12	2013	Ball State
	Christian Blake	12	2017	San Diego State
	Tyrice Richie	12	2020	Western Michigan

=== Receiving yards ===
Career
Rank	Player	Yards	Years
1	Justin McCareins	2,991	1997 1998 1999 2000
2	Martel Moore	2,544	2009 2010 2011 2012
3	Sam Hurd	2,322	2002 2003 2004 2005
4	Da'Ron Brown	2,295	2011 2012 2013 2014
5	Kenny Golladay	2,285	2015 2016
6	Hugh Rohrschneider	2,224	1960 1961 1962 1963
7	P. J. Fleck	2,162	1999 2000 2001 2002 2003
8	Trayvon Rudolph	2,047	2020 2021 2023 2024
9	Cole Tucker	2,030	2018 2019 2020 2021 2022
10	Dan Sheldon	1,986	2001 2002 2003 2004

Single season
Rank	Player	Yards	Year
1	Dave Petzke	1,215	1978
2	Justin McCareins	1,168	2000
3	Kenny Golladay	1,156	2016
4	Kenny Golladay	1,129	2015
5	Martel Moore	1,083	2012
6	Sam Hurd	1,074	2005
7	Da'Ron Brown	1,065	2014
8	Hugh Rohrschneider	1,036	1963
9	P. J. Fleck	1,028	2003
10	Matt Simon	969	2007

Single game
Rank	Player	Yards	Year	Opponent
1	Trayvon Rudolph	309	2021	Kent State
2	Sam Hurd	266	2005	Central Michigan
3	P. J. Fleck	234	2003	Ohio
4	Martel Moore	224	2011	Arkansas State
5	Sam Hurd	223	2005	Miami (Ohio)
6	Hugh Rohrschneider	221	1962	Illinois State
7	Dan Sheldon	213	2004	Western Michigan
	Kenny Golladay	213	2015	UNLV
9	Da'Ron Brown	209	2013	Ball State
10	Matt Simon	205	2007	Central Michigan

=== Receiving touchdowns ===
Career
Rank	Player	TDs	Years
1	Justin McCareins	29	1997 1998 1999 2000
2	Martel Moore	24	2009 2010 2011 2012
3	John Spilis	22	1966 1967 1968 1969
4	Sam Hurd	21	2002 2003 2004 2005
5	Al Eck	19	1958 1959 1960
	Hugh Rohrschneider	19	1960 1961 1962 1963
	Da'Ron Brown	19	2011 2012 2013 2014
8	Dan Sheldon	18	2001 2002 2003 2004
	Kenny Golladay	18	2015 2016
10	Gary Stearns	17	1960 1961 1962 1963
	Shane Wimann	17	2014 2015 2016 2017

Single season
Rank	Player	TDs	Year
1	Hugh Rohrschneider	14	1963
2	Sam Hurd	13	2005
	Martel Moore	13	2012
4	Fran Cahill	11	1951
	Al Eck	11	1959
	Dave Petzke	11	1978
7	John Spilis	10	1968
	Justin McCareins	10	1999
	Justin McCareins	10	2000
	Kenny Golladay	10	2015

Single game
Rank	Player	TDs	Year	Opponent
1	Fran Cahill	4	1951	Illinois State
	Hugh Rohrschneider	4	1963	UW-Whitewater

== Total offense ==
Total offense is the sum of passing and rushing statistics. It does not include receiving or returns.

=== Total offense yards ===
Career
Rank	Player	Yards	Years
1	Chandler Harnish	11,927	2008 2009 2010 2011
2	Jordan Lynch	10,552	2010 2011 2012 2013
3	Chris Finlen	6,778	1997 1999 2000 2001
4	George Bork	6,402	1960 1961 1962 1963
5	Marshall Taylor	6,138	1985 1986 1987 1988
6	Rocky Lombardi	6,118	2021 2022 2023
7	Drew Hare	6,063	2013 2014 2015 2016
8	Josh Haldi	5,949	2001 2002 2003 2004
9	Marcus Childers	5,693	2017 2018 2019
10	Garrett Wolfe	5,214	2004 2005 2006

Single season
Rank	Player	Yards	Year
1	Jordan Lynch	4,953	2012
2	Jordan Lynch	4,812	2013
3	Chandler Harnish	4,595	2011
4	Chandler Harnish	3,366	2010
5	Drew Hare	3,222	2014
6	Rocky Lombardi	3,069	2021
7	George Bork	2,945	1963
8	Marcus Shilders	2,706	2018
9	Josh Haldi	2,479	2003
10	Rocky Lombardi	2,403	2023

Single game
Rank	Player	Yards	Year	Opponent
1	Jordan Lynch	569	2012	Toledo
2	Rocky Lombardi	554	2021	Kent State
3	Chandler Harnish	519	2011	Ball State
4	Phil Horvath	477	2005	Akron
5	Jordan Lynch	471	2013	Central Michigan
6	Jordan Lynch	468	2013	Ball State
7	Jordan Lynch	467	2012	Army
8	Chandler Harnish	465	2011	Central Michigan
9	Anthony Maddie	458	2016	Ball State
10	Chandler Harnish	452	2011	Bowling Green

=== Total touchdowns ===
Career
Rank	Player	TDs	Years
1	Jordan Lynch	99	2010 2011 2012 2013
2	Chandler Harnish	92	2008 2009 2010 2011
3	George Bork	65	1960 1961 1962 1963
4	Josh Haldi	61	2001 2002 2003 2004
5	Marcus Childers	53	2017 2018 2019
6	Chris Finlen	52	1997 1999 2000 2001
	Garrett Wolfe	52	2004 2005 2006
8	Stacey Robinson	51	1988 1989 1990
9	Drew Hare	48	2013 2014 2015 2016
	Rocky Lombardi	48	2021 2022 2023

Single season
Rank	Player	TDs	Year
1	Jordan Lynch	47	2013
2	Jordan Lynch	44	2012
3	Chandler Harnish	39	2011
4	George Bork	33	1963
5	Josh Haldi	28	2003
	Chandler Harnish	28	2010
7	Stacey Robinson	27	1990
8	George Bork	26	1962
	Drew Hare	26	2014
10	Ron Christian	25	1965

== Defense ==
=== Interceptions ===
Career
Rank	Player	Ints	Years
1	Dan Meyer	16	1964 1965 1966
2	Al Eck	15	1958 1959 1960
	Vince Thompson	15	1999 2000 2001 2002
4	Chris Blake	14	1971 1972 1973
5	Randee Drew	14	2000 2001 2002 2003
6	Steve Hirsch	13	1980 1981 1982 1983
7	Dan DeVito	12	1968 1969 1970
	Rich Marks	12	1971 1972 1973
	Shawun Lurry	12	2015 2016
10	Lionel Hickenbottom	11	2001 2003 2004
	Jimmie Ward	11	2010 2011 2012 2013
	Dechane Durante	11	2011 2012 2013 2014

Single season
Rank	Player	Ints	Year
1	Al Jones	10	1951
2	Shawun Lurry	9	2015
3	Dan Meyer	8	1965
4	Al Eck	7	1960
	Randee Drew	7	2002
	Jimmie Ward	7	2013

Single game
Rank	Player	Ints	Year	Opponent
1	Dan Mojica	4	1951	Illinois State
	Dan Meyer	4	1966	Hillsdale

=== Tackles ===
Career
Rank	Player	Tackles	Years
1	Frank Lewandoski	616	1976 1977 1978 1979
2	Tim Griffin	471	1982 1983 1984 1985
3	Larry Clark	446	1970 1971 1972
4	Ron Delisi	437	1986 1987 1988 1989
5	Larry Williams	434	1999 2000 2001 2002
6	Gerald Nickelbrry	419	1991 1992 1993 1994
7	Steve Wild	411	1990 1991 1992 1993
8	Mike Terna	408	1977 1978 1979 1980
9	Mandel Hester	375	1993 1994 1995 1996
10	Akil Grant	361	2000 2001 2002 2003

Single season
Rank	Player	Tackles	Year
1	Steve Henriksen	191	1991
2	Larry Clark	189	1972
3	Frank Lewandoski	179	1977
4	Frank Lewandoski	173	1979
5	Ron Delisi	171	1988
6	Tim Griffin	155	1985
7	Steve Henriksen	153	1990
8	Mike Terna	151	1980
9	Larry Alleyne	144	1981
10	Tony Smith	142	1992

Single game
Rank	Player	Tackles	Year	Opponent
1	Frank Lewandoski	33	1978	Western Michigan

=== Sacks ===
Career
Rank	Player	Sacks	Years
1	Larry English	31.5	2005 2006 2007 2008
2	Cary Caliendo	31.0	1987 1988 1989 1990
3	Sutton Smith	30.0	2016 2017 2018
4	Sean Progar-Jackson	24.0	2009 2010 2011 2012
5	Scott Kellar	23.0	1982 1983 1984
6	Devonte O'Malley	22.0	2020 2021 2022 2023 2024
7	Jake Coffman	20.0	2007 2008 2009 2010
8	C.J. Rose	19.0	1992 1993 1994 1995
9	Josh Corcoran	16.5	2015 2016 2017 2018
10	Larry Williams	16.0	1999 2000 2001 2002
	Brian Atkinson	16.0	2001 2002 2003 2004
	Alan Baxter	16.0	2009 2010 2011 2012

Single season
Rank	Player	Sacks	Year
1	Sutton Smith	15.0	2018
2	Sutton Smith	14.0	2017
3	Scott Kellar	12.0	1984
	Larry English	12.0	2006
5	Larry English	10.5	2007
6	Cary Caliendo	10.0	1987
	Larry Williams	10.0	2002
	Josh Corcoran	10.0	2018
9	Jake Coffman	9.5	2010
	Alan Baxter	9.5	2012

Single game
Rank	Player	Sacks	Year	Opponent
1	Larry English	5.0	2007	Idaho

== Kicking ==
=== Field goals made ===
Career
Rank	Player	FGs	Years
1	Steve Azar	73	2000 2001 2002 2003
2	John Richardson	61	2019 2020 2021 2022
3	Chris Nendick	57	2004 2005 2006 2007
4	Mathew Sims	54	2010 2011 2012 2013
5	John Ivanic	46	1987 1988 1989 1990
6	Vince Scott	41	1980 1981 1982 1983
7	Mike Salerno	37	2008 2009
8	Christian Hagan	34	2014 2015 2016
9	Rome Moga	31	1977 1978 1979 1980
	Brian Clark	31	1995 1996 1997 1998
	Kanon Woodill	31	2021 2023 2024

Single season
Rank	Player	FGs	Year
1	John Richardson	22	2021
2	Steve Azar	21	2003
3	Steve Azar	20	2001
	Chris Nendick	20	2006
	Mathew Sims	20	2011
6	Mike Salerno	19	2009
7	John Ivanic	18	1987
	Steve Azar	18	2002
	Mike Salerno	18	2008
	John Richardson	18	2022

Single game
Rank	Player	FGs	Year	Opponent
1	Vince Scott	5	1982	Ohio
	Chris Nendick	5	2006	Temple
	John Richardson	5	2021	Toledo

=== Field goal percentage ===
Career
Rank	Player	FG%	Years
1	Steve Azar	79.3%	2000 2001 2002 2003
2	John Richardson	79.2%	2019 2020 2021 2022
3	Andrew Glass	78.6%	2025
4	Vince Scott	75.9%	1980 1981 1982 1983
5	Mike Salerno	75.5%	2008 2009
6	John Ivanic	73.0%	1987 1988 1989 1990
7	Chris Nendick	72.2%	2004 2005 2006 2007
8	Christian Hagan	70.8%	2014 2015 2016
9	Brian Clark	68.9%	1995 1996 1997 1998
10	Mathew Sims	68.4%	2010 2011 2012 2013

Single season
Rank	Player	FG%	Year
1	Steve Azar	93.3%	2000
2	Kent Baker	85.7%	1999
3	Vince Scott	85.0%	1983
4	John Richardson	81.5%	2021
5	Steve Azar	80.8%	2003
6	John Ivanic	78.9%	1988
	Mathew Sims	78.9%	2012
8	Andrew Glass	78.6%	2025
9	John Richardson	78.3%	2022
10	Christian Hagan	77.8%	2015
	John Richardson	77.8%	2019
	John Richardson	77.8%	2020
