= Huskie Stadium =

Stadium in Illinois, United States

- "The House That Bork Built"

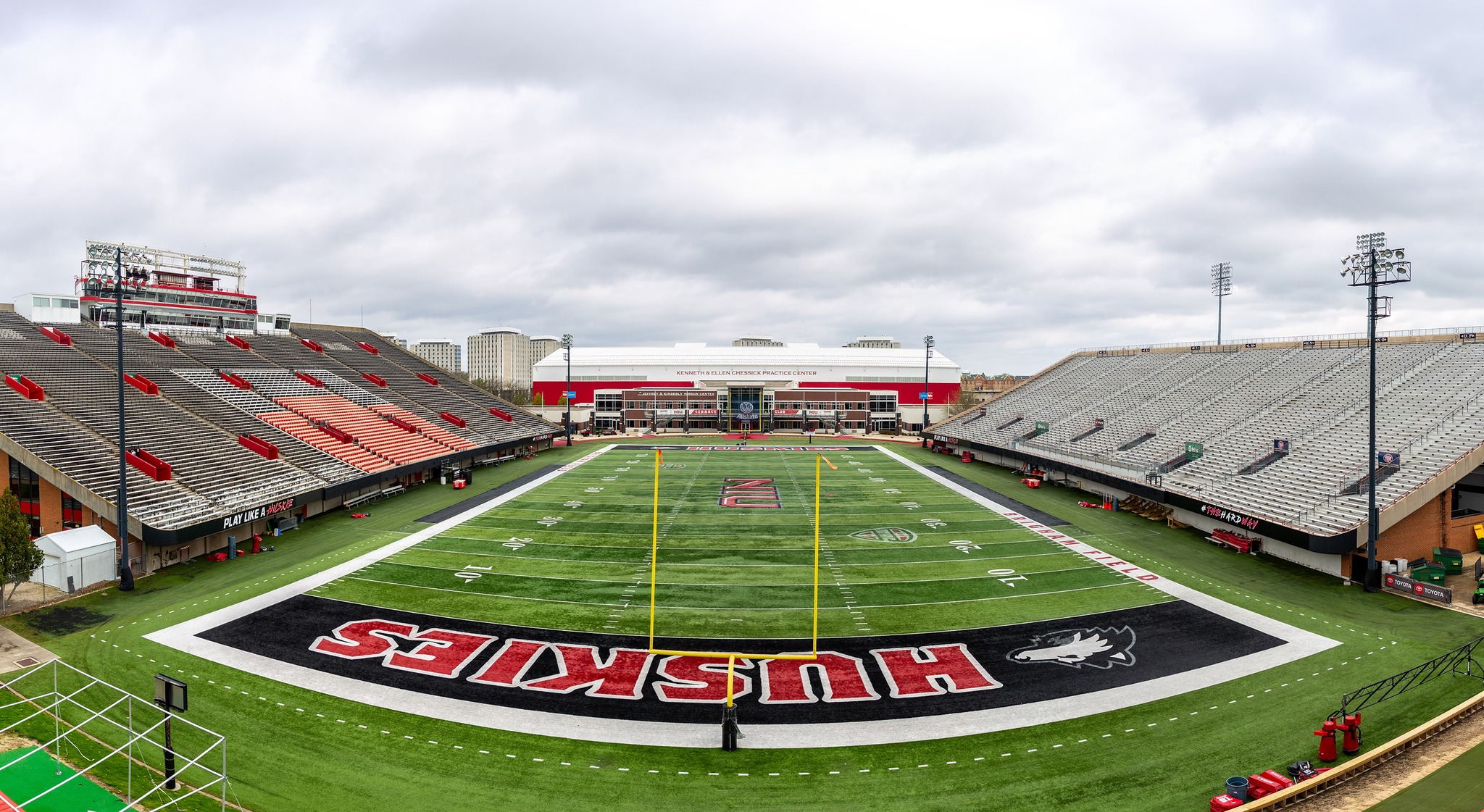
- Huskie Stadium in 2024

- Location in Illinois Location in the United States
- Full name: Brigham Field at Huskie Stadium
- Location: Northern Illinois University; 1245 Stadium Drive South; DeKalb, Illinois, U.S.
- Coordinates: 41.934°N 88.778°W
- Owner: Northern Illinois University
- Operator: NIU Athletics
- Capacity: 28,211 (2003–present)
- Surface: AstroTurf (2024-present); FieldTurf (2001–2023); AstroTurf (1969–2000); Natural grass (1965–1968)
- Record attendance: 28,221 (2003) (vs. Western Michigan)

Construction
- Groundbreaking: January 30, 1964
- Opened: November 6, 1965; 60 years ago
- Expanded: 1982, 1995, 2016
- Cost: $2,265,172 (original) ($23.1 million in 2025)
- Architects: Holabird & Root, Chicago (West); HOK Sport (East expansion)
- General contractor: Peterson-Roberts Construction

Tenants
- NIU Huskies (NCAA) football (1965–present); DeKalb High School (1966–2010); IHSA Football Playoffs (2013–2021, odd years)

Website
- niuhuskies.com/huskie-stadium

Huskie Stadium is a college football stadium located on the campus of Northern Illinois University in DeKalb, Illinois. Opened 61 years ago in 1965, it is the home field of the NIU Huskies of the Mountain West Conference (MWC).

== Location ==
Located on the west end of campus, Huskie Stadium is bordered by Stadium Drive to the south, the Yordon Athletic Center to the north, Mary Bell Field to the east, and Ralph McKinzie Field to the west. The playing field has a conventional north–south alignment at an elevation of 870 feet (265 m) above sea level.

== Stadium history ==
=== Early years ===
Before the 1965 season, the Huskies played at Glidden Field, a 5,500-seat facility on the east end of campus. However, after quarterback George Bork led the team to an AP small college national championship in 1963, they began the construction of Huskie Stadium. Marred by construction setbacks that put the opening day two months behind schedule, the stadium played host to its first official NIU football game on November 6, when the Huskies defeated the Illinois State Redbirds, 48–6. Through 1968, the playing surface was natural grass.

In 1969, the home opener against Idaho on September 20 marked the state's first major college gridiron contest played on artificial turf, and the Huskies won the night game, 47–30. The field was re-carpeted in 1980 and 1990 before the introduction of infilled FieldTurf in 2001. A new AstroTurf surface was installed in 2024.

The stadium originally consisted of the main concrete west stands (which used to contain practice facilities for the gymnastics and wrestling teams) and much smaller temporary stands on the east side. The east side was completely redone in 1995, creating a steel structure to mirror the concrete one. The university has maintained and enhanced the institution's all-around athletics facility, updating the scoreboard and video display system in both 2000 and 2001, and creating the South End Zone berm in 2002. In 2003, the field was renamed "Brigham Field" in honor of Robert J. Brigham, a former NIU player, coach, and athletic director.

The stadium was also the site of a few NCAA records. Against Fresno State in 1990, quarterback Stacey Robinson rushed for 287 yards in the first half, and finished with 308 overall, as NIU upset the 24th-ranked Bulldogs 73–18. In that game on October 6, the Huskies established school records for rushing yards (733), total offense (806), and first downs (36). It was also the first victory over a ranked opponent at the stadium. In 2013, Jordan Lynch rushed for 321 yards on November 26, setting an FBS record for most rushing yards in a game by a quarterback.

=== 21st century ===
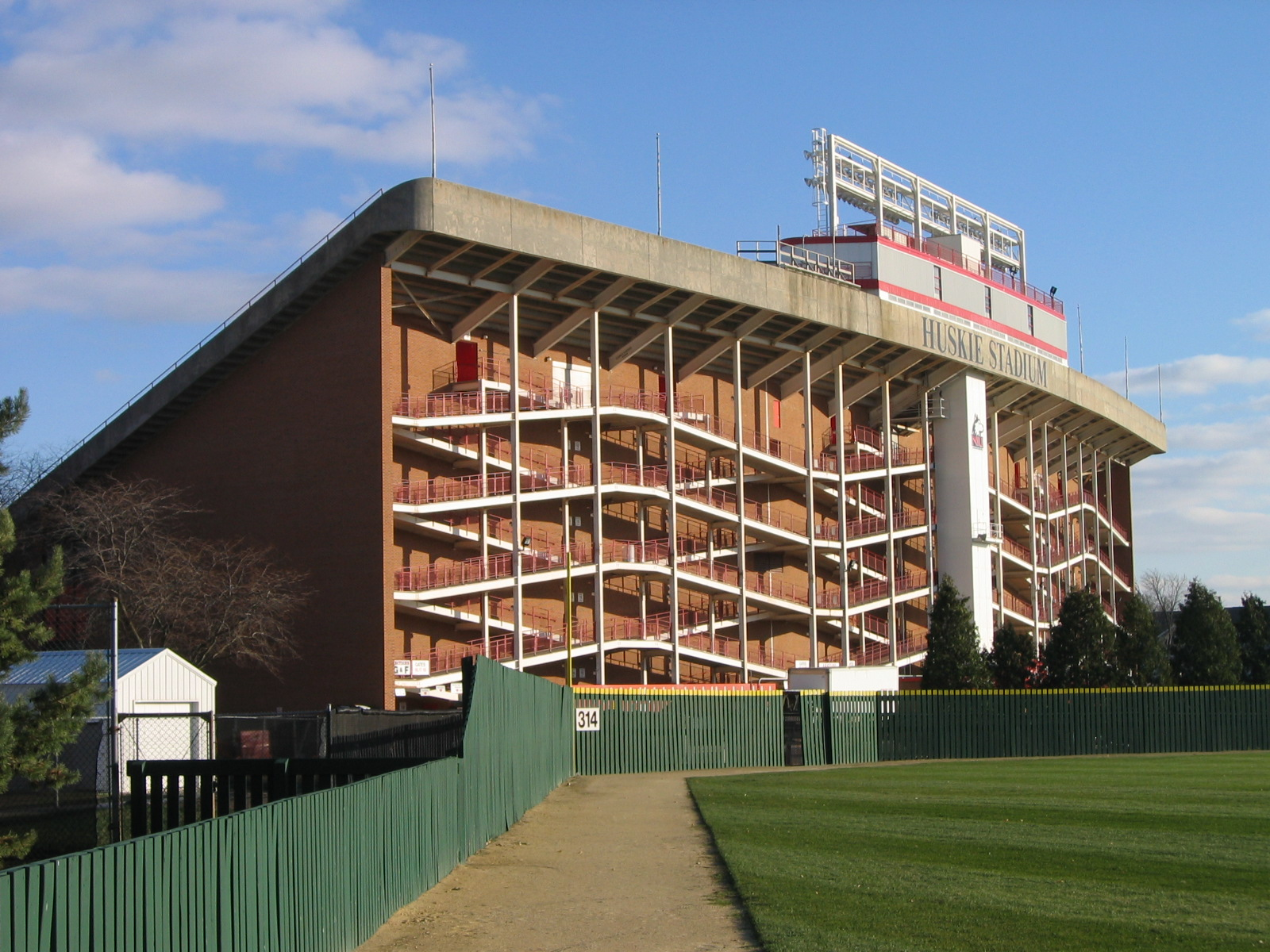
Exterior of the stadium in 2007

In the 21st century, the football program has generated national headlines for the institution. With seven consecutive winning seasons (best in the MAC), NIU has the 25th best record in the nation since 2000 (53–30)---including triumphs over Bowl Championship Series programs such as Notre Dame, Wisconsin, BYU, Nebraska, Georgia Tech, Wake Forest, Minnesota, University of Alabama, Kansas, University of Maryland, Purdue University (2009, 2013), Iowa, and Iowa State University among others. The Huskies finished ranked in the Top 30 during the 2003 and 2004 seasons and defeated Troy University, 34–21, in the 2004 Silicon Valley Football Classic. In 2006, NIU faced off against TCU in the Poinsettia Bowl in San Diego, California making it the second time in three years NIU had gone to a postseason bowl game. The Huskies made it four bowls in six years with a trip to the International Bowl in 2010 against the University of South Florida. Later, in 2012, they became the first non-AQ team with one loss to go to a BCS bowl game (Orange Bowl).

With the addition of the Yordon Athletic Center, the total capacity for the stadium has decreased to 23,595. In 2013, Huskie Stadium in its current seating format recorded two sellouts in the year. This was the first time since 2003 the Huskies recorded a sellout at the stadium.

== 2014 plans for renovation ==
NIU had announced plans in 2014 to renovate Huskie Stadium. Following the renovation, the stadium will have a horseshoe shape, with end zone seating added to the south side of the stadium. The capacity will be raised to between 30,000 and 35,000, with the potential to expand it further to 42,000 in the future. The gymnastics and wrestling practice areas housed within the stadium will be moved to make room on the west side for a full concourse, more concessions, and more easily accessible restrooms. The east side will hold new luxury seating sections, including suites, double suites, loge box seating, a club lounge, as well as both indoor and outdoor club seats. Naming rights for the stadium might be sold after its renovation.

With a capacity somewhere between 30,000 and 35,000, the renovation will make Huskie Stadium amongst the MAC's largest in capacity. Both InfoCision Stadium (Akron) and Waldo Stadium (Western Michigan) hold 30,000; Rynearson Stadium (Eastern Michigan) holds 30,200; Kelly/Shorts Stadium (Central Michigan) holds 30,255. The only three of the venues mentioned that are in the West Division of the MAC alongside the Huskies are Waldo Stadium, Rynearson Stadium, and Kelly/Shorts Stadium, meaning that post-renovation, Huskie Stadium will quite possibly be the largest stadium in the division, if not the MAC.

In the announcement of the planned renovations, athletic director Sean Frazier commented, “We always want more seats, but we also people to fill those seats"..."We want something very intimate. We have a great, great facility right now. What we want to do is build off of that. When that thing is full nobody wants to play in Huskie Stadium. It is definitely a difference-maker when you’re out there.”

The renovations will be part of a $138 million overhaul to NIU's athletic facilities. As part of this overhaul, Ralph McKinzie Field, located just west of Huskie Stadium, will be replaced by a new artificial-turf baseball stadium to be built northeast of the Convocation Center and south of the Outdoor Recreation Sports Complex. A tennis facility featuring four indoor courts and locker rooms will be built to the west of the Chessick Practice Center and house NIU's tennis teams. An 'Olympic sports facility' containing practice areas for golf, gymnastics, and wrestling, as well as locker rooms for multiple sports, will be built to the west of the tennis facility. The wrestling and gymnastics practice areas will replace those currently housed within Huskie Stadium. The Convocation Center will have a ring built behind the seating area to connect the lobbies on the north and south sides, allowing fans to walk from one side of the venue to the other using the concourse. Mary M. Bell Field will see an increase from 650 seats to 1,000 seats, and will also be given new restrooms, concessions, and locker rooms.

As of 2026, the stadium renovations have yet to take place.

== Yordon Athletic Center ==
In 2005, it was announced that the NIU Academic and Athletic Performance Center, a new field house and athletic training facility, would be built in the north end zone. At a press conference in conjunction with the annual NIU Spring Football Game, first-year Athletics Director Jim Phillips announced on April 23, 2005, that Huskie Intercollegiate Athletics would embark on the largest capital project in its history. Located at the north end zone, NIU began breaking ground for the new $14-million all-purpose facility in the fall of 2006, with the construction finishing the following summer and opening in August 2007.

Inside the Jeffrey and Kimberly Yordon Center is a 3,150 sq ft (293 m^{2}) football locker room with a 780 sq ft (72 m^{2}) gathering area, a 12,505 sq ft (1,161.8 m^{2}) strength and conditioning center (largest in the MAC), an academic support center, athletic training room with rehab pools, a 150-seat meeting room, video editing room, all ten coaches' offices, football equipment room, coaches' locker room, and computer classrooms for student-athletes.

== Chessick Practice Center ==
In October 2013, NIU opened their indoor Chessick Practice Center.

The practice center features a full-size 120-yard practice field with two end zones and overrun buffer space around the field for safety. The practice room itself is 80,600 square feet (7,490 m^{2}), with 6,400 square feet (590 m^{2}) in the adjoining Barsema Hall of Champions, and can house practice equipment for the NIU football, baseball, softball, and soccer teams.

== Attendance records ==
1. 28,211 vs. Western Michigan (10-18-2003)
2. 28,218 vs. Iowa State (09-27-2003)
3. 28,071 vs. Southern Illinois (09-11-2004)
4. 28,018 vs. Maryland (08-28-2003)
5. 27,802 vs. Long Beach State (09-12-1981)

== See also ==
- List of NCAA Division I FBS football stadiums
