= 1932 Northern Illinois State Evansmen football team =

American college football season

1932 Northern Illinois State Evansmen football
- Conference: Illinois Intercollegiate Athletic Conference
- Record: 4–2–1 (2–2–1 IIAC)
- Head coach: Chick Evans (4th season)
- Captain: Byron Kaiser
- Home stadium: Glidden Field

1932 Illinois Intercollegiate Athletic Conference football standings
	Conf.					Overall
Team	W		L		T	W		L		T
Illinois Wesleyan +	6	–	0	–	0	6	–	2	–	0
McKendree +	5	–	0	–	0	9	–	1	–	0
Augustana (IL)	5	–	0	–	1	6	–	0	–	2
Illinois State Normal	6	–	2	–	0	7	–	2	–	0
Bradley	3	–	1	–	1	3	–	3	–	2
Western Illinois	4	–	2	–	1	4	–	2	–	1
St. Viator	2	–	1	–	0	3	–	4	–	1
Shurtleff	5	–	3	–	0	6	–	3	–	0
Millikin	3	–	2	–	0	5	–	2	–	1
Illinois College	3	–	3	–	0	3	–	4	–	0
Northern Illinois State	2	–	2	–	1	4	–	2	–	1
Monmouth (IL)	2	–	2	–	1	4	–	3	–	2
Lake Forest	2	–	2	–	0	4	–	3	–	1
North Central	2	–	4	–	0	4	–	5	–	0
Eureka	1	–	3	–	1	1	–	4	–	1
Wheaton (IL)	1	–	3	–	0	4	–	3	–	0
Southern Illinois	1	–	4	–	1	2	–	5	–	3
Carthage	0	–	4	–	3	1	–	4	–	4
Knox (IL)	0	–	4	–	0	0	–	8	–	0
Elmhurst	0	–	5	–	0	0	–	6	–	0
Eastern Illinois	0	–	6	–	0	1	–	7	–	0
+ – Conference co-champions

The 1932 Northern Illinois State Evansmen football team represented Northern Illinois State Teachers College—now known as Northern Illinois University—as a member of the Illinois Intercollegiate Athletic Conference (IIAC) during the 1932 college football season. Led by fourth-year head coach Chick Evans, the Evansmen compiled an overall record of 4–2–1 with a mark of 2–2–1 in conference play, tying for tenth place in the IIAC. The team played home games at the 5,500-seat Glidden Field, located on the east end of campus, in DeKalb, Illinois.

== Schedule ==
Date	Opponent	Site	Result
October 1	Illinois State	Glidden Field; DeKalb, IL	L 7–8
October 8	at Eureka	Eureka, IL	L 0–7
October 15	Southern Illinois	Glidden Field; DeKalb, IL	T 0–0
October 22	Crane JC*	Chicago, IL	W 31–6
October 29	Wisconsin Tech*	Glidden Field; DeKalb, IL	W 25–6
November 4	North Central	Glidden Field; DeKalb, IL	W 7–6
November 12	at Wheaton (IL)	Wheaton, IL	W 6–0
*Non-conference game
