= 1932 Southern Illinois Maroons football team =

American college football season

1932 Southern Illinois Maroons football
- Conference: Illinois Intercollegiate Athletic Conference
- Record: 2–5–3 (1–4–1 IIAC)
- Head coach: William McAndrew (16th season)

1932 Illinois Intercollegiate Athletic Conference football standings
	Conf.					Overall
Team	W		L		T	W		L		T
Illinois Wesleyan +	6	–	0	–	0	6	–	2	–	0
McKendree +	5	–	0	–	0	9	–	1	–	0
Augustana (IL)	5	–	0	–	1	6	–	0	–	2
Illinois State Normal	6	–	2	–	0	7	–	2	–	0
Bradley	3	–	1	–	1	3	–	3	–	2
Western Illinois	4	–	2	–	1	4	–	2	–	1
St. Viator	2	–	1	–	0	3	–	4	–	1
Shurtleff	5	–	3	–	0	6	–	3	–	0
Millikin	3	–	2	–	0	5	–	2	–	1
Illinois College	3	–	3	–	0	3	–	4	–	0
Northern Illinois State	2	–	2	–	1	4	–	2	–	1
Monmouth (IL)	2	–	2	–	1	4	–	3	–	2
Lake Forest	2	–	2	–	0	4	–	3	–	1
North Central	2	–	4	–	0	4	–	5	–	0
Eureka	1	–	3	–	1	1	–	4	–	1
Wheaton (IL)	1	–	3	–	0	4	–	3	–	0
Southern Illinois	1	–	4	–	1	2	–	5	–	3
Carthage	0	–	4	–	3	1	–	4	–	4
Knox (IL)	0	–	4	–	0	0	–	8	–	0
Elmhurst	0	–	5	–	0	0	–	6	–	0
Eastern Illinois	0	–	6	–	0	1	–	7	–	0
+ – Conference co-champions

The 1932 Southern Illinois Maroons football team was an American football team that represented Southern Illinois Normal University (now known as Southern Illinois University Carbondale) in the Illinois Intercollegiate Athletic Conference (IIAC) during the 1932 college football season. In its 16th season under head coach William McAndrew, the team compiled a 2–5–3 record.

== Schedule ==
Date	Opponent	Site	Result	Source
September 16	Scott Field*	Carbondale, IL	W 32–0	
September 24	at Illinois Wesleyan	Wilder Field; Bloommington, IL	L 0–7	
September 30	Murray State*	Carbondale, IL	T 0–0	
October 7	Cape Girardeau*	Carbondale, IL	L 0–19	
October 15	at Northern Illinois State	Glidden Field; DeKalb, IL	T 0–0	
October 21	McKendree	Lebanon, IL	L 7–20	
October 28	Illinois State Normal	Carbondale, IL	L 6–20	
November 5	at Shurtleff	Alton, IL	L 0–6	
November 11	at Cape Girardeau*	Houck Stadium; Cape Girardeau, MO	T 0–0	
November 19	Eastern Illinois	Carbondale, IL	W 25–0	
*Non-conference game
