= Dave Petzke =

American football player (born c. 1957)

No. 6
- Positions: Split end, punter

Personal information
- Born: June 10, 1957 (age 69)
- Listed height: 6 ft 1 in (1.85 m)
- Listed weight: 182 lb (83 kg)

Career information
- High school: Highland (Pocatello, ID)
- College: Waldorf (1975–1976); Northern Illinois (1977–1978)

Awards and highlights
- NCAA receiving leader (1978); Third-team All-American (1978); MAC Co-Offensive Player of the Year (1978); Northern Illinois Huskies jersey No. 6 retired

David Karl Petzke (born June 10, 1957) is an American former football split end and punter. He played college football for Waldorf (1975–1976) and Northern Illinois (1977–1978). In 1978, he led the NCAA major-college players in receptions, receiving yards, and receiving touchdowns. He was selected as the 1978 Mid-American Conference co-player of the year, and his jersey (no. 6) was retired by Northern Illinois.

== Early life ==
Petze was born in 1957, the son of a Lutheran minister. He attended Highland High School in Pocatello, Idaho. He played football in his junior year at Highland, but he moved to Faribault, Minnesota, where he missed the first four games of his senior year due to knee injury.

== College football ==
Petzke received no scholarship offers from Division I schools. He enrolled at Waldorf Junior College in Forest City, Iowa. He recalled choosing Waldorf because it "had a good record of placing people into four-year colleges after they were done playing for them." At Waldorf, Petzke caught five passes as a freshman and 30 as a sophomore, but Waldorf's wishbone offense did not provide much opportunity as a receiver, and Petzke was used principally as a punter.

Petzke transferred to Northern Illinois as a junior in 1977. Northern Illinois head coach Pat Culpepper recalled the recruitment of Petzke: "His appearance wasn't all that impressive. He was slight of build and wore a beard and didn't say much. He was a rather nondescript person. But we liked him as a punter and thought he blocked well. We couldn't tell how good a receiver he was becuse Waldorf ran the veer and never threw to him."

Petzke was Northern Illinois' leading receiver in 1977, tallying 57 passes for 743 yards and five touchdowns. His 57 receptions ranked seventh nationally. He was also named the most valuable player on the 1977 team.

As a senior in 1978, Petzke led the NCAA major-college players in all three major receiving categories with 91 receptions, 1,215 receiving yards, and 11 receiving touchdowns. He led the NCAA in receptions by 29 catches over the second-best performer. At the time, his 91 receptions ranked fourth all time in NCAA history, trailing only Howard Twilley, Jay Miller, and Jerry Hendren. He was only the second Northern Illinois player to win a national individual statistical championship, following Mark Kellar in 1973. At the end of the 1978 season, Petzke was selected as the MAC co-offensive player of the year along with Western Michigan's Jerome Persell.

Northern Illinois coach Culpepper noted that Petzke accomplished these results despite not having great speed and receiving "double and sometimes triple coverage" and credited Petze's accomplishments to being a "great worker" with high concentration and his ability to "cut on a dime" and run tight routes. Petzke said that the "sideliner" was his favorite route, as he appreciated the "art" of knowing "exactly where you are" without looking at the sideline.

For his career at Northern Illinois, Petzke tallied 148 receptions for 1,958 yards and 16 touchdowns. Petzke was selected for the all-time Northern Illinois football team in 1995 and the all-century team in 1999. He is one of only four Northern Illinois football players to have their jersey number retired.

== Later life ==
Petzke was not selected in the NFL draft, but he had free agent tryouts with the Chicago Bears (NFL), Saskatchewan Roughriders (CFL), and Chicago Blitz (USFL).

Petzke later worked for American Funds Distributors in Boulder, Colorado.

== See also ==
- List of NCAA major college football yearly receiving leaders
