= 1960 Eastern Illinois Panthers football team =

American college football season

1960 Eastern Illinois Panthers football
- Conference: Interstate Intercollegiate Athletic Conference
- Record: 2–7 (1–5 IIAC)
- Head coach: Ralph Kohl (4th season)
- Home stadium: Lincoln Field

1960 Interstate Intercollegiate Athletic Conference football standings
	Conf.					Overall
Team	W		L		T	W		L		T
No. 13 Southern Illinois $	6	–	0	–	0	8	–	2	–	0
Western Illinois	5	–	1	–	0	6	–	2	–	0
Northern Illinois	4	–	2	–	0	7	–	2	–	0
Central Michigan	3	–	3	–	0	3	–	5	–	0
Illinois State Normal	1	–	4	–	1	2	–	6	–	1
Eastern Illinois	1	–	5	–	0	2	–	7	–	0
Eastern Michigan	0	–	5	–	1	0	–	8	–	1
$ – Conference champion; Rankings from NAIA poll

The 1960 Eastern Illinois Panthers football team represented Eastern Illinois University as a member of the Interstate Intercollegiate Athletic Conference (IIAC) during the 1960 college football season. The team was led by fourth-year head coach Ralph Kohl and played their home games at Lincoln Field in Charleston, Illinois. The Panthers finished the season with a 2–7 record overall and a 1–5 record in conference play.

== Schedule ==
Date	Opponent	Site	Result	Attendance	Source
September 17	Indiana State*	Lincoln Field; Charleston, IL	W 14–0		
September 24	at Wittenberg*	Wittenberg Stadium; Springfield, OH	L 0–27		
October 1	at Ball State*	Ball State Field; Muncie, IN	L 6–14	6,500	
October 8	at Northern Illinois	Glidden Field; DeKalb, IL	L 20–28	5,200	
October 15	No. 8 Southern Illinois	Lincoln Field; Charleston, IL	L 8–52		
October 22	at Eastern Michigan	Briggs Field; Ypsilanti, MI	W 8–0	5,200	
October 29	at Western Illinois	Hanson Field; Macomb, IL	L 6–43		
November 5	Central Michigan	Lincoln Field; Charleston, IL	L 12–35	2,000	
November 12	Illinois State Normal	Lincoln Field; Charleston, IL (rivalry)	L 6–26		
*Non-conference game; Rankings from AP Poll released prior to the game
