= 1960 Central Michigan Chippewas football team =

American college football season

1960 Central Michigan Chippewas football
- Conference: Interstate Intercollegiate Athletic Conference
- Record: 3–5 (3–3 IIAC)
- Head coach: Kenneth Kelly (10th season)
- MVP: Bob Fisher
- Home stadium: Alumni Field

1960 Interstate Intercollegiate Athletic Conference football standings
	Conf.					Overall
Team	W		L		T	W		L		T
No. 13 Southern Illinois $	6	–	0	–	0	8	–	2	–	0
Western Illinois	5	–	1	–	0	6	–	2	–	0
Northern Illinois	4	–	2	–	0	7	–	2	–	0
Central Michigan	3	–	3	–	0	3	–	5	–	0
Illinois State Normal	1	–	4	–	1	2	–	6	–	1
Eastern Illinois	1	–	5	–	0	2	–	7	–	0
Eastern Michigan	0	–	5	–	1	0	–	8	–	1
$ – Conference champion; Rankings from NAIA poll

The 1960 Central Michigan Chippewas football team represented Central Michigan University in the Interstate Intercollegiate Athletic Conference (IIAC) during the 1960 college football season. In their 10th season under head coach Kenneth Kelly, the Chippewas compiled a 3–5 record (3–3 against IIAC opponents) and were outscored by their opponents by a combined total of 165 to 161.

The team's statistical leaders included Wally Sadosty with 531 passing yards, Bob Fisher with 492 rushing yards, and Len Jagello with 150 receiving yards. Fisher received the team's most valuable player award. Two Central Michigan players (defensive backs Frank Gawkowski and Jerry O'Neil) received first-team honors on the All-IIAC team.

== Schedule ==
Date	Opponent	Site	Result	Attendance	Source
September 17	at Western Michigan*	Waldo Stadium; Kalamazoo, MI (rivalry)	L 0–31	11,000	
September 24	at Northern Michigan*	Marquette, MI	L 3–20	4,000	
October 1	at Western Illinois	Hanson Field; Macomb, IL	L 13–38	6,000	
October 8	Illinois State Normal	Alumni Field; Mount Pleasant, MI	W 50–0	5,300	
October 15	Eastern Michigan^{†}	Alumni Field; Mount Pleasant, MI (rivalry)	W 28–0	9,000–9,200	
October 22	at Northern Illinois	Glidden Field; DeKalb, IL	L 15–36	12,500	
October 29	at Eastern Illinois	Lincoln Field; Charleston, IL	W 35–12	2,000	
November 12	Southern Illinois	Alumni Field; Mount Pleasant, MI	L 17–28	6,100	
*Non-conference game; ^{†}Homecoming
