= 1960 Southern Illinois Salukis football team =

American college football season

1960 Southern Illinois Salukis football

IIAC champion
- Conference: Interstate Intercollegiate Athletic Conference
- Record: 8–2 (6–0 IIAC)
- Head coach: Carmen Piccone (2nd season)
- Home stadium: McAndrew Stadium

1960 Interstate Intercollegiate Athletic Conference football standings
	Conf.					Overall
Team	W		L		T	W		L		T
No. 13 Southern Illinois $	6	–	0	–	0	8	–	2	–	0
Western Illinois	5	–	1	–	0	6	–	2	–	0
Northern Illinois	4	–	2	–	0	7	–	2	–	0
Central Michigan	3	–	3	–	0	3	–	5	–	0
Illinois State Normal	1	–	4	–	1	2	–	6	–	1
Eastern Illinois	1	–	5	–	0	2	–	7	–	0
Eastern Michigan	0	–	5	–	1	0	–	8	–	1
$ – Conference champion; Rankings from NAIA poll

The 1960 Southern Illinois Salukis football team was an American football team that represented Southern Illinois University (now known as Southern Illinois University Carbondale) in the Interstate Intercollegiate Athletic Conference (IIAC) during the 1960 college football season. In their second year under head coach Carmen Piccone, the Salukis compiled a 8–2 record (6–0 in conference games), were outscored opponents by a total of 183 to 173, and won the IIAC championship.

The team played its home games at McAndrew Stadium in Carbondale, Illinois.

== Schedule ==
Date	Opponent	Rank	Site	Result	Attendance	Source
September 17	Missouri Mines*		McAndrew Stadium; Carbondale, IL	W 34–14		
September 24	Ohio Wesleyan*		McAndrew Stadium; Carbondale, IL	W 30–13	8,000	
October 1	at Northern Illinois		Glidden Field; DeKalb, IL	W 21–20	7,200	
October 8	Western Illinois		McAndrew Stadium; Carbondale, IL	W 21–12		
October 15	at Eastern Illinois	No. 8	Lincoln Field; Charleston, IL	W 52–8		
October 22	Illinois State Normal^{†}	No. 9	McAndrew Stadium; Carbondale, IL	W 30–6	12,000	
October 29	Eastern Michigan	No. 7	McAndrew Stadium; Carbondale, IL	W 66–8		
November 6	at No. 5 Bowling Green*	No. 6	University Stadium; Bowling Green, OH	L 6–27	6,200	
November 12	at Central Michigan		Alumni Field; Mount Pleasant, MI	W 28–17	6,100	
November 19	at No. 1 Ohio*		Peden Stadium; Athens, OH	L 6–48	11,000	
*Non-conference game; ^{†}Homecoming; Rankings from AP Poll released prior to the game

== NFL draft ==
The following Saluki was selected into the 1961 NFL draft following the season.

Round	Pick	Player	Position	NFL team
3	38	Houston Antwine	Guard	Detroit Lions
