= 1960 Northern Illinois Huskies football team =

American college football season

1960 Northern Illinois Huskies football
- Conference: Interstate Intercollegiate Athletic Conference
- Record: 7–2 (4–2 IIAC)
- Head coach: Howard Fletcher (5th season)
- MVP: Bob Soltis
- Captains: Robert Seamans; Derril Corbett
- Home stadium: Glidden Field

1960 Interstate Intercollegiate Athletic Conference football standings
	Conf.					Overall
Team	W		L		T	W		L		T
No. 13 Southern Illinois $	6	–	0	–	0	8	–	2	–	0
Western Illinois	5	–	1	–	0	6	–	2	–	0
Northern Illinois	4	–	2	–	0	7	–	2	–	0
Central Michigan	3	–	3	–	0	3	–	5	–	0
Illinois State Normal	1	–	4	–	1	2	–	6	–	1
Eastern Illinois	1	–	5	–	0	2	–	7	–	0
Eastern Michigan	0	–	5	–	1	0	–	8	–	1
$ – Conference champion; Rankings from NAIA poll

The 1960 Northern Illinois Huskies football team represented Northern Illinois University as a member of the Interstate Intercollegiate Athletic Conference (IIAC) during the 1960 college football season. Led by fifth-year head coach Howard Fletcher, the Huskies compiled an overall record of 7–2 with a mark of 4–2 in conference play, placing third in the IIAC. The team played home games at the 5,500-seat Glidden Field, located on the east end of campus, in DeKalb, Illinois.

== Schedule ==
Date	Opponent	Site	Result	Attendance	Source
September 17	North Central*	Glidden Field; DeKalb, IL	W 26–6	3,800	
September 24	at Wheaton (IL)*	Wheaton, IL	W 21–8	4,700	
October 1	Southern Illinois	Glidden Field; DeKalb, IL	L 20–21	7,200	
October 8	Eastern Illinois	Glidden Field; DeKalb, IL	W 28–20	5,200	
October 15	at Western Illinois	Hanson Field; Macomb, IL	L 19–30	13,500	
October 22	Central Michigan	Glidden Field; DeKalb, IL	W 36–15	12,500	
October 29	at Illinois State	Normal, IL	W 20–0	9,500	
November 5	at Eastern Michigan	Ypsilanti, MI	W 19–0	400	
November 12	La Crosse State*	Glidden Field; DeKalb, IL	W 28–26	12,000	
*Non-conference game
