= 1960 Eastern Michigan Hurons football team =

American college football season

1960 Eastern Michigan Hurons football
- Conference: Interstate Intercollegiate Athletic Conference
- Record: 0–8–1 (0–5–1 IIAC)
- Head coach: Fred Trosko (9th season)
- MVP: Leonard Natkowski
- Captain: Alfred E. Iverson
- Home stadium: Briggs Field

1960 Interstate Intercollegiate Athletic Conference football standings
	Conf.					Overall
Team	W		L		T	W		L		T
No. 13 Southern Illinois $	6	–	0	–	0	8	–	2	–	0
Western Illinois	5	–	1	–	0	6	–	2	–	0
Northern Illinois	4	–	2	–	0	7	–	2	–	0
Central Michigan	3	–	3	–	0	3	–	5	–	0
Illinois State Normal	1	–	4	–	1	2	–	6	–	1
Eastern Illinois	1	–	5	–	0	2	–	7	–	0
Eastern Michigan	0	–	5	–	1	0	–	8	–	1
$ – Conference champion; Rankings from NAIA poll

The 1960 Eastern Michigan Hurons football team represented Eastern Michigan University in the Interstate Intercollegiate Athletic Conference (IIAC) during the 1960 college football season. In their ninth season under head coach Fred Trosko, the Hurons compiled a 0–8–1 record (0–5–1 against IIAC opponents) and were outscored by their opponents, 230 to 38. The team played Illinois State to a 14–14 tie. Alfred E. Iverson was the team captain. The team's statistical leaders included Bill Yanis with 388 yards of total offense and the same measure in receiving yards, George Beaudette with 339 passing yards, and Jim Dills with 231 rushing yards. Leonard Natkowski received the team's most valuable player award.

The 1960 season was part of a 29-game winless streak that spanned from 1959 to 1962. The 1960 Eastern Michigan team had 35 fumbles. It also set an Eastern Michigan record (which still stands) for the fewest net yards of total offense – 554 (an average of 61.5 yards per game). The season reached a low point on October 29, 1960, with a 66-8 loss against the Southern Illinois Salukis, a game in which the Salukis scored two touchdowns in the first 23 seconds of the game.

== Schedule ==
Date	Opponent	Site	Result	Attendance	Source
September 17	Albion*	Briggs Field; Ypsilanti, MI	L 7–21	3,500	
September 22	at Youngstown State*	Youngstown, OH	L 7–27		
October 1	at Illinois State Normal	McCormick Field; Normal, IL	T 14–14		
October 7	Northern Michigan*	Briggs Field; Ypsilanti, MI	L 0–21	3,500	
October 15	at Central Michigan	Alumni Field; Mount Pleasant, MI (rivalry)	L 0–28	9,000–9,200	
October 22	Eastern Illinois	Briggs Field; Ypsilanti, MI	L 0–8	5,200	
October 29	at No. 7 Southern Illinois	McAndrew Stadium; Carbondale, IL	L 8–66		
November 5	Northern Illinois^{†}	Briggs Field; Ypsilanti, MI	L 0–19	400	
November 12	Western Illinois	Briggs Field; Ypsilanti, MI	L 2–26	400	
*Non-conference game; ^{†}Homecoming; Rankings from AP Poll released prior to the game
