= 1965 Eastern Illinois Panthers football team =

American college football season

1965 Eastern Illinois Panthers football
- Conference: Interstate Intercollegiate Athletic Conference
- Record: 3–5 (1–3 IIAC)
- Head coach: Clyde Biggers (1st season)
- Home stadium: Lincoln Field

1965 Interstate Intercollegiate Athletic Conference football standings
	Conf.					Overall
Team	W		L		T	W		L		T
Northern Illinois $	4	–	0	–	0	9	–	1	–	0
Central Michigan	3	–	1	–	0	5	–	5	–	0
Western Illinois	2	–	2	–	0	4	–	5	–	0
Eastern Illinois	1	–	3	–	0	3	–	5	–	0
Illinois State	0	–	4	–	0	0	–	9	–	0
$ – Conference champion

The 1965 Eastern Illinois Panthers football team represented Eastern Illinois University as a member of the Interstate Intercollegiate Athletic Conference (IIAC) during the 1965 NCAA College Division football season. The team was led by first-year head coach Clyde Biggers and played their home games at Lincoln Field in Charleston, Illinois. The Panthers finished the season with a 3–5 record overall and a 1–3 record in conference play.

== Schedule ==
Date	Opponent	Site	Result	Attendance	Source
September 18	at Indiana State*	Memorial Stadium; Terre Haute, IN	L 0–17		
September 25	Ferris State*	Lincoln Field; Charleston, IL	W 35–22		
October 2	Milwaukee*	Shorewood Stadium; Shorewood, WI	W 28–24		
October 9	at Illinois State	Hancock Stadium; Normal, IL (rivalry)	W 8–7		
October 16	Northwood*	Lincoln Field; Charleston, IL	L 7–42		
October 23	Western Illinois^{†}	Lincoln Field; Charleston, IL	L 8–28		
October 30	No. 8 Northern Illinois	Lincoln Field; Charleston, IL	L 11–20		
November 6	at Central Michigan	Alumni Field; Mount Pleasant, MI	L 6–48	6,200	
*Non-conference game; ^{†}Homecoming; Rankings from AP Poll released prior to the game
