= 1965 Central Michigan Chippewas football team =

American college football season

1965 Central Michigan Chippewas football
- Conference: Interstate Intercollegiate Athletic Conference
- Record: 5–5 (3–1 IIAC)
- Head coach: Kenneth Kelly (15th season)
- MVP: Pat Boyd
- Home stadium: Alumni Field

1965 Interstate Intercollegiate Athletic Conference football standings
	Conf.					Overall
Team	W		L		T	W		L		T
Northern Illinois $	4	–	0	–	0	9	–	1	–	0
Central Michigan	3	–	1	–	0	5	–	5	–	0
Western Illinois	2	–	2	–	0	4	–	5	–	0
Eastern Illinois	1	–	3	–	0	3	–	5	–	0
Illinois State	0	–	4	–	0	0	–	9	–	0
$ – Conference champion

The 1965 Central Michigan Chippewas football team represented Central Michigan University in the Interstate Intercollegiate Athletic Conference (IIAC) during the 1965 NCAA College Division football season. In their 15th season under head coach Kenneth Kelly, the Chippewas compiled a 5–5 record (3–1 against IIAC opponents), lost four straight games to start the season, won four straight to end the season, and outscored all opponents by a combined total of 193 to 144.

The team's statistical leaders included quarterback Pat Boyd with 1,604 passing yards, halfback Jim Acitelli with 445 rushing yards, and halfback Wally Hempton with 605 receiving yards. Boyd threw a school record 17 interceptions in 1965, but also set a school record for passing yards in a season and received the team's most valuable player award. Eight Central Michigan players (Hempton, Acitelli, halfback Don Krueger, tackles Norb Miller and John Plec, offensive guard/defensive end Lyle Spalding, center Tom Stoops, and defensive guard Paul Verska) received first-team honors on the All-IIAC team.

== Schedule ==
Date	Opponent	Site	Result	Attendance	Source
September 11	Whitewater State*	Alumni Field; Mount Pleasant, MI	L 13–35	7,200	
September 17	at Youngstown State*	Youngstown, OH	L 14–35	4,200	
September 25	Western Michigan*	Alumni Field; Mount Pleasant, MI (rivalry)	L 13–21	7,500	
October 2	Northern Illinois	Alumni Field; Mount Pleasant, MI	L 14–19	3,500	
October 9	at Northern Michigan*	Marquette, MI	W 13–0	4,600	
October 16	Hillsdale*^{†}	Alumni Field; Mount Pleasant, MI	L 0–13	9,200	
October 23	at Illinois State	Hancock Stadium; Normal, IL	W 32–8	11,500	
October 30	at Western Illinois	Hanson Field; Macomb, IL	W 9–7	11,250	
November 6	Eastern Illinois	Alumni Field; Mount Pleasant, MI	W 48–6	6,200	
November 13	at Ferris State*	Big Rapids, MI	W 37–0	2,000	
*Non-conference game; ^{†}Homecoming
