= Da'Ron Brown =

American football player (born 1991)

No. 4, 1, 14, 81
- Position: Wide receiver

Personal information
- Born: September 21, 1991 (age 35); Chicago, Illinois, U.S.
- Listed height: 6 ft 0 in (1.83 m)
- Listed weight: 199 lb (90 kg)

Career information
- High school: Morgan Park (Chicago)
- College: Northern Illinois
- NFL draft: 2015: 7th round, 233rd overall pick

Career history
- Kansas City Chiefs (2015–2016)*; New England Patriots (2016)*; New York Giants (2016)*; Miami Dolphins (2016)*; Los Angeles Chargers (2017)*
- * Offseason or practice squad member only

Awards and highlights
- Second-team All-MAC (2014)
- Stats at Pro Football Reference

Da'Ron Brown (born September 21, 1991) is an American former football wide receiver. He played college football at Northern Illinois.

== Professional career ==
Pre-draft measurables
Height	Weight	Arm length	Hand span	40-yard dash	10-yard split	20-yard split	20-yard shuttle	Three-cone drill	Vertical jump	Broad jump	Bench press
6 ft 0 1/8 in (1.83 m)	205 lb (93 kg)	32 in (0.81 m)	10 1/4 in (0.26 m)	4.54 s	1.55 s	2.62 s	4.11 s	7.04 s	37.0 in (0.94 m)	10 ft 0 in (3.05 m)	17 reps
All values from NFL Combine

=== Kansas City Chiefs ===
He was selected by the Kansas City Chiefs in the seventh round of the 2015 NFL draft. He spent the entire 2015 season on the practice squad and was signed to a reserve/futures contract at the end of the season. On September 3, 2016, he was released by the Chiefs.

=== New England Patriots ===
On September 27, 2016, Brown was signed to the New England Patriots' practice squad. He was released by the Patriots on October 1, 2016.

=== New York Giants ===
On November 9, 2016, Brown was signed to the New York Giants practice squad. He was released by the Giants on November 17, 2016.

=== Miami Dolphins ===
On December 1, 2016, Brown was signed to the Miami Dolphins practice squad.

=== Los Angeles Chargers ===
On January 19, 2017, Brown signed a futures contract with the Los Angeles Chargers. He was waived on September 2, 2017.
