= 1963 Central Michigan Chippewas football team =

American college football season

1963 Central Michigan Chippewas football
- Conference: Interstate Intercollegiate Athletic Conference
- Record: 4–5–1 (2–2 IIAC)
- Head coach: Kenneth Kelly (13th season)
- MVP: Chuck Koons
- Home stadium: Alumni Field

1963 Interstate Intercollegiate Athletic Conference football standings
	Conf.					Overall
Team	W		L		T	W		L		T
No. 1 Northern Illinois $	4	–	0	–	0	10	–	0	–	0
Western Illinois	3	–	1	–	0	6	–	3	–	0
Central Michigan	2	–	2	–	0	4	–	5	–	1
Eastern Illinois	1	–	3	–	0	2	–	7	–	0
Illinois State Normal	0	–	4	–	0	3	–	6	–	0
$ – Conference champion; Rankings from NAIA poll

The 1963 Central Michigan Chippewas football team represented Central Michigan University in the Interstate Intercollegiate Athletic Conference (IIAC) during the 1963 NCAA College Division football season. In their 13th season under head coach Kenneth Kelly, the Chippewas compiled a 4–5–1 record (2–2 against IIAC opponents) and outscored their opponents by a combined total of 209 to 195.

The team's statistical leaders included quarterback Pat Boyd with 817 passing yards, Bill Shuple with 693 rushing yards, and halfback Larry Moore with 397 receiving yards. Halfback Chuck Koons received the team's most valuable player award. Four Central Michigan players (Larry Moore, offensive guard Ken Bickel, linebacker Frank Goldberg, and offensive tackle Tom Lang) received first-team honors on the All-IIAC team.

== Schedule ==
Date	Opponent	Site	Result	Attendance	Source
September 14	vs. Bradley*	Saginaw, MI	L 6–12	6,500	
September 21	at Youngstown State*	Youngstown, OH	T 7–7	5,470	
September 28	Western Michigan*	Alumni Field; Mount Pleasant, MI (rivalry)	W 30–14	7,200	
October 5	Eastern Illinois	Alumni Field; Mount Pleasant, MI	W 35–15	6,500	
October 12	at Northern Michigan*	Marquette, MI	L 0–19	4,800	
October 19	at Western Illinois	Hanson Field; Macomb, IL	L 7–28	3,500	
October 26	at Illinois State Normal	Hancock Stadium; Normal, IL	W 24–22	12,000	
November 2	at Eastern Michigan*	Briggs Field; Ypsilanti, MI (rivalry)	W 55–20	5,550	
November 9	No. 1 Northern Illinois^{†}	Alumni Field; Mount Pleasant, MI	L 22–27	11,000–11,164	
November 16	Hillsdale *	Alumni Field; Mount Pleasant, MI	L 23–31	4,000	
*Non-conference game; ^{†}Homecoming; Rankings from AP Poll released prior to the game
