= Sam Hurd =

American football player (born 1985)

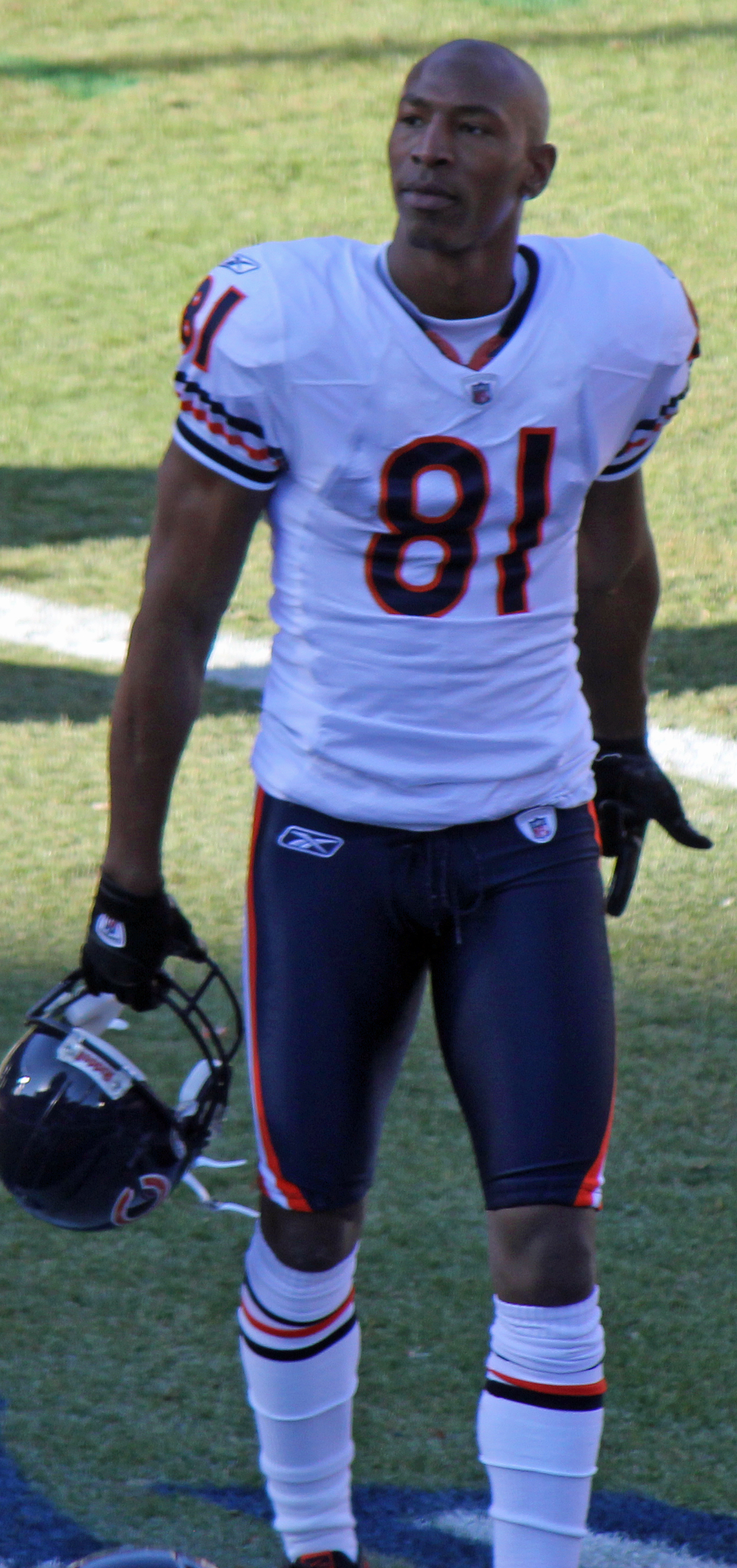
- Hurd with the Chicago Bears in 2011

No. 17, 81
- Position: Wide receiver

Personal information
- Born: April 24, 1985 (age 41); San Antonio, Texas, U.S.
- Listed height: 6 ft 3 in (1.91 m)
- Listed weight: 200 lb (91 kg)

Career information
- High school: Brackenridge (San Antonio)
- College: Northern Illinois
- NFL draft: 2006: undrafted

Career history
- Dallas Cowboys (2006–2010); Chicago Bears (2011)

Awards and highlights
- All-MAC (2005)

Career NFL statistics
- Receptions: 53
- Receiving yards: 739
- Receiving touchdowns: 2
- Stats at Pro Football Reference

Samuel George Hurd III (born April 24, 1985) is an American former professional football player who was convicted for dealing drugs. He played as a wide receiver in the National Football League (NFL) for the Dallas Cowboys and Chicago Bears. He played college football for the Northern Illinois Huskies.

== Early life ==
Hurd attended Brackenridge High School in San Antonio, Texas, where he practiced football, basketball and track. As a senior wide receiver, he posted 60 receptions for 1,639 yards and 23 touchdowns, receiving All-state honors.

== College career ==
Hurd accepted a football scholarship from Northern Illinois University. As a true freshman, he appeared in 12 games (2 starts), collecting 22 receptions for 512 yards and 3 touchdowns. As a sophomore, he registered 29 receptions for 438 yards and 2 touchdowns in 12 games (7 starts).

As a junior, he appeared in 10 games, making 27 receptions for 298 yards and 3 touchdowns. He helped NIU to a victory in the 2004 Silicon Valley Football Classic in a game that was delayed nearly 40 minutes due to a power outage.

A strong running offense limited Hurd's receiving stats until his senior year, when he registered 65 receptions for 1,074 yards, and 13 touchdowns (second best in school history). He also had the best receiving game in school history with 266 yards against Central Michigan University. He teamed with P. J. Fleck, Shatone Powers, and Dan Sheldon to form one of the best wide receiver groups in the MAC.

Hurd finished his college career with 143 receptions (tied for fifth in school history), 2,323 yards (second in school history), and 21 receiving touchdowns (third in school history).

== Professional career ==
=== Dallas Cowboys ===
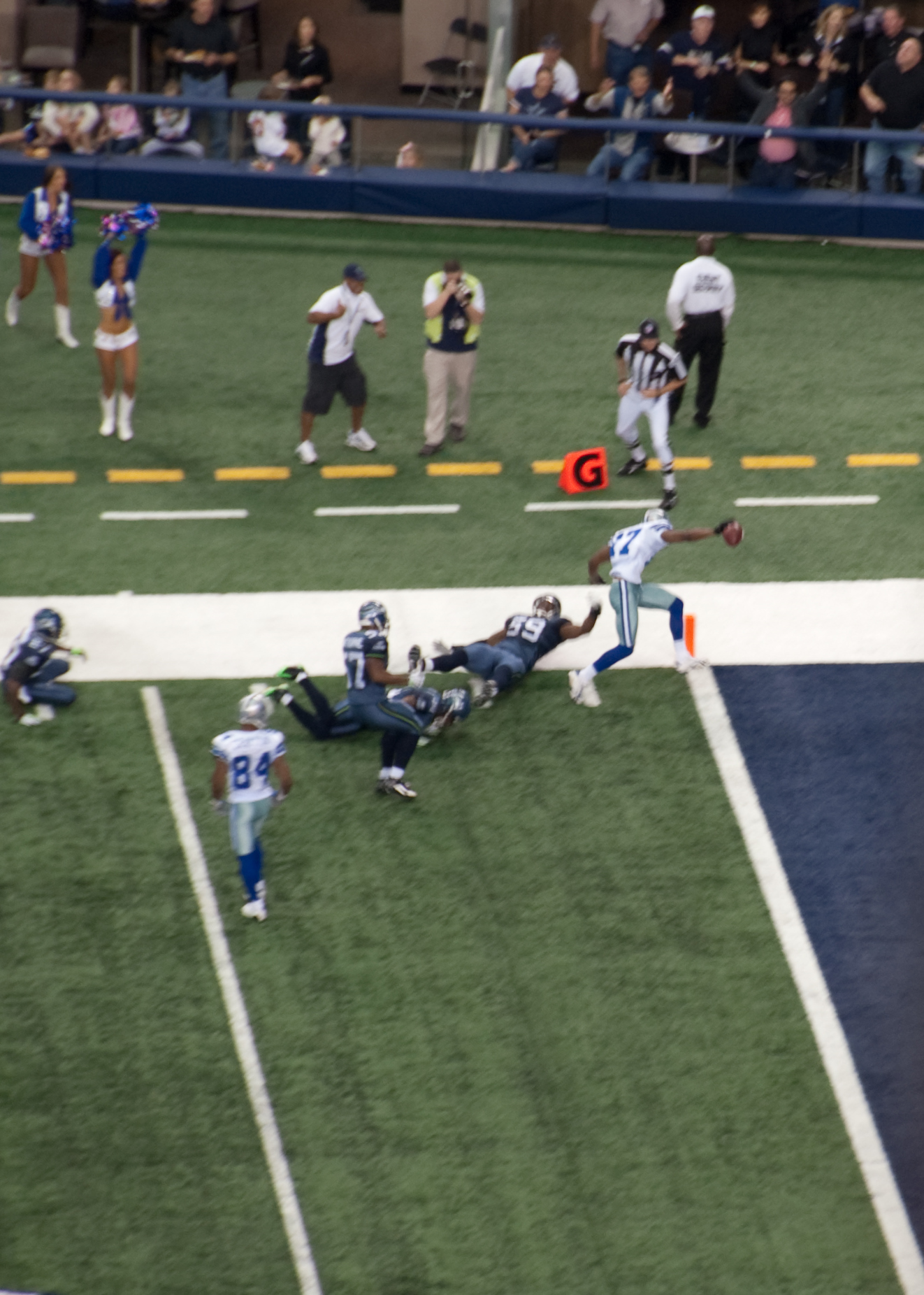
Hurd scoring a touchdown for the Cowboys against the Seahawks in 2009

Hurd was signed as an undrafted free agent by the Dallas Cowboys after the 2006 NFL draft on May 1. He recorded his first NFL reception on Tony Romo's first NFL pass (33 yards) against the Houston Texans. Four weeks later, he got his first start against the Arizona Cardinals, recording four catches for 42 yards and also caught a touchdown pass that was negated due to offensive pass interference against Patrick Crayton. He ended the season with 5 catches for 75 yards 16 special teams tackles (tied for second on the team), one forced fumble and one fumble recovery.

In 2007, he was the team's third receiver, tallying 19 receptions for 314 yards, one touchdown and 16 special teams tackles (sixth on the team).

In 2008, after the release of Terry Glenn, Hurd was given the opportunity to start opposite to Terrell Owens, but suffered a high left-ankle sprain in preseason that caused him to miss the first three games of the season. He returned to play in three games, before re-injuring his ankle and being placed on the injured reserve list on October 16. He finished with one special teams tackle.

In 2009, he led the Cowboys with 19 special teams tackles. In 2010, he was named special teams captain, finishing the season second on the team with 21 tackles.

During his time with the Cowboys he had some great training camp performances, but he never developed as a consistent wide receiver. His contributions came mainly as a key special teams performer, earning NFC Special Teams Player of the Week in 2006 as a rookie.

=== Chicago Bears ===
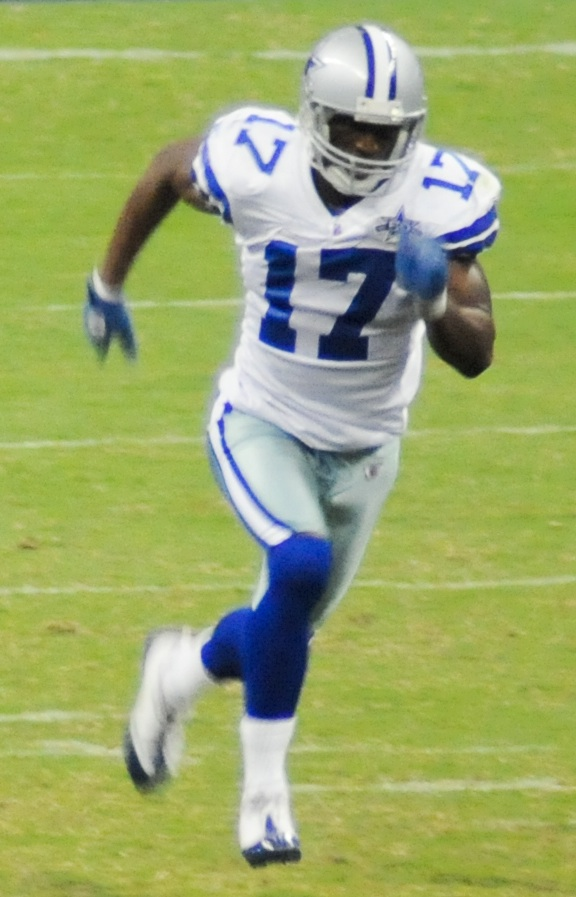
Hurd with the Cowboys in 2010

On July 29, 2011, he signed a three-year contract as a free agent with the Chicago Bears. The Bears named Hurd their special teams captain, but cut him from the team on December 16, following his arrest on drug-related charges.

== Personal life ==
In 2007, Hurd started co-hosting Inside the Huddle, a one-hour player commentary show that aired live on 105.3 FM radio in Dallas, as well as a 30-minute television show on Time Warner Cable's ESPN2 and Video on Demand service. It was originally co-hosted by quarterback Tony Romo, but in 2008, Hurd teamed up with wide receiver Terrell Owens for the show that aired on Tuesday nights on KLLI from the House of Blues in Dallas. Hurd ran a program called "Running with the Hurd", which is aimed at helping underprivileged young children.

=== Arrest and incarceration ===
On December 14, 2011, Hurd was arrested in Chicago for allegedly attempting to purchase and distribute large quantities of cocaine and marijuana, and faced federal drug charges in the Dallas Division of the Northern District of Texas. The case was investigated by the ICE (U.S. Immigration and Customs Enforcement). The investigation started in July 2011, during the NFL lockout, and while Hurd was a member of the Bears. The complaint alleged Hurd had negotiated to pay $25,000 per kilogram of cocaine, and another $1,000 per kilogram ($450/lb) of marijuana. Police believed Hurd was connected to a group of dealers arrested in California in August 2011, because a phone number traced to Hurd was found in the caller ID of one of the dealers. On January 24, after finding a new attorney, Hurd entered a plea of not guilty for setting up a drug-dealing network.

On August 9, 2012, Hurd was arrested again for violating his bond by failing two drug tests. The report stated Hurd failed his first drug test in May and a second on July 12, testing positive for marijuana and admitting to drug use both times. His attorney, Jay Ethington, said Hurd was going through a difficult time and succumbed to pressure, according to the report. A federal judge later ordered Hurd to be jailed indefinitely. On April 10, 2013, Hurd announced he would change his plea to guilty the following day. He faced a sentence of 10 years to life.

On November 13, 2013, Hurd was sentenced to 15 years in prison. Hurd was incarcerated at the Federal Correctional Institution in Bastrop, Texas. He was released from federal prison to community confinement on January 31, 2023. He was discharged from his sentence on February 23, 2023.

== See also ==
- List of professional sportspeople convicted of crimes
