= Randee Drew =

American gridiron football player (born 1981)

Profile
- Position: Defensive back

Personal information
- Born: November 22, 1981 (age 44); Milwaukee, Wisconsin
- Listed height: 5 ft 9 in (1.75 m)
- Listed weight: 190 lb (86 kg)

Career information
- College: Northern Illinois

Career history
- 2004: San Francisco 49ers*
- 2005: Cologne Centurions
- 2006: Orlando Predators
- 2006: Green Bay Blizzard
- 2006: BC Lions*
- 2007–2009: Montreal Alouettes
- 2009–2010: Edmonton Eskimos
- * Offseason or practice squad member only

Awards and highlights
- CFL East All-Star (2007); First-team All-MAC (2002)
- Stats at CFL.ca

Randee Drew (born November 22, 1982) is an American former professional football defensive back. He was signed by the San Francisco 49ers as an undrafted free agent in 2004. He played college football at Northern Illinois.

Drew was also a member of the Cologne Centurions, Orlando Predators, Green Bay Blizzard, BC Lions, Montreal Alouettes, and Edmonton Eskimos.
