= Howard Fletcher =

American football player and coach (1913–2001)

Biographical details
- Born: March 13, 1913; Streator, Illinois, U.S.
- Died: August 23, 2001 (aged 88); Fort Myers, Florida, U.S.

Playing career
- 1938–1939: Northern Illinois State
- Position: Tackle

Coaching career (HC unless noted)
- c. 1950: West Chicago HS (IL)
- 1952–1955: Walnut Hills HS (OH)
- 1956–1968: Northern Illinois State / Northern Illinois

Head coaching record
- Overall: 74–48–1 (college)
- Bowls: 1–2

Accomplishments and honors

Championships
- 1 NCAA College Division (1963); 3 IIAC (1963–1965)

Howard W. Fletcher (March 13, 1913 – August 23, 2001) was an American football player and coach. He served as the head football coach at the Northern Illinois University from 1956 to 1968, compiling a record of 74–48–1. Fletcher's Northern Illinois Huskies squad was named the NCAA College Division Champion by the Associated Press in 1963. He led the Huskies to three consecutive Interstate Intercollegiate Athletic Conference (IIAC) championships, in 1963, 1964, and 1965. The Huskies also won the Mineral Water Bowl in 1963.

== Head coaching record ==
=== College ===
Year	Team	Overall	Conference	Standing	Bowl/playoffs
Northern Illinois State / Northern Illinois Huskies (Interstate Intercollegiate Athletic Conference) (1956–1965)
1956	Northern Illinois State	1–8	0–6	7th	
1957	Northern Illinois	2–7	1–5	6th	
1958	Northern Illinois	4–5	2–4	T–5th	
1959	Northern Illinois	7–2	4–2	2nd	
1960	Northern Illinois	7–2	4–2	3rd	
1961	Northern Illinois	4–4–1	3–2–1	T–4th	
1962	Northern Illinois	8–2	3–1	2nd	L Mineral Water
1963	Northern Illinois	10–0	4–0	1st	W Mineral Water
1964	Northern Illinois	7–2	3–1	T–1st	
1965	Northern Illinois	9–1	4–0	1st	L Mineral Water
Northern Illinois Huskies (NCAA College Division independent) (1966–1968)
1966	Northern Illinois	8–2			
1967	Northern Illinois	5–5			
1968	Northern Illinois	2–8			
Northern Illinois:		74–48–1	28–21–1		
Total:		74–48–1			
National championship Conference title Conference division title or championship game berth
