= 1963 Eastern Illinois Panthers football team =

American college football season

1963 Eastern Illinois Panthers football
- Conference: Interstate Intercollegiate Athletic Conference
- Record: 2–7 (1–3 IIAC)
- Head coach: Ralph Kohl (7th season)
- Home stadium: Lincoln Field

1963 Interstate Intercollegiate Athletic Conference football standings
| | Conf. | | | | | Overall |
| Team | W | | L | | T | W | | L | | T |
|---|---|---|---|---|---|---|---|---|---|---|
| No. 1 Northern Illinois $ | 4 | – | 0 | – | 0 | 10 | – | 0 | – | 0 |
| Western Illinois | 3 | – | 1 | – | 0 | 6 | – | 3 | – | 0 |
| Central Michigan | 2 | – | 2 | – | 0 | 4 | – | 5 | – | 1 |
| Eastern Illinois | 1 | – | 3 | – | 0 | 2 | – | 7 | – | 0 |
| Illinois State Normal | 0 | – | 4 | – | 0 | 3 | – | 6 | – | 0 |
$ – Conference champion; Rankings from NAIA poll

The 1963 Eastern Illinois Panthers football team represented Eastern Illinois University as a member of the Interstate Intercollegiate Athletic Conference (IIAC) during the 1963 NCAA College Division football season. The team was led by seventh-year head coach Ralph Kohl and played their home games at Lincoln Field in Charleston, Illinois. The Panthers finished the season with a 2–7 record overall and a 1–3 record in conference play.

== Schedule ==
| Date | Opponent | Site | Result | Attendance | Source |
|---|---|---|---|---|---|
| September 21 | at Indiana State* | Memorial Stadium; Terre Haute, IN | L 6–14 | 7,000 | |
| September 28 | Central State (OH)* | Lincoln Field; Charleston, IL | L 14–28 | | |
| October 5 | at Central Michigan | Alumni Field; Mount Pleasant, MI | L 15–35 | 6,500 | |
| October 12 | at Illinois State Normal | Hancock Stadium; Normal, IL (rivalry) | W 14–13 | | |
| October 19 | Ferris State* | Lincoln Field; Charleston, IL | W 20–6 | | |
| October 26 | No. 1 Northern Illinois | Lincoln Field; Charleston, IL | L 0–43 | 6,803 | |
| November 2 | at Hillsdale* | Hillsdale Stadium; Hillsdale, MI | L 7–14 | | |
| November 9 | at Hope* | Riverview Park; Holland, MI | L 6–15 | 2,800 | |
| November 16 | Western Illinois | Lincoln Field; Charleston, IL | L 7–22 | | |
*Non-conference game; Rankings from AP Poll released prior to the game
