= 1963 Northern Illinois Huskies football team =

American college football season

1963 Northern Illinois Huskies football

AP small college national champion IIAC champion

Mineral Water Bowl, W 21–14 vs. Southwest Missouri State
- Conference: Interstate Intercollegiate Athletic Conference

Ranking
- AP: No. 1
- Record: 10–0 (4–0 IIAC)
- Head coach: Howard Fletcher (8th season)
- MVP: George Bork
- Captains: Michael Henigan; George Bork
- Home stadium: Glidden Field

1963 Interstate Intercollegiate Athletic Conference football standings
	Conf.					Overall
Team	W		L		T	W		L		T
No. 1 Northern Illinois $	4	–	0	–	0	10	–	0	–	0
Western Illinois	3	–	1	–	0	6	–	3	–	0
Central Michigan	2	–	2	–	0	4	–	5	–	1
Eastern Illinois	1	–	3	–	0	2	–	7	–	0
Illinois State Normal	0	–	4	–	0	3	–	6	–	0
$ – Conference champion; Rankings from NAIA poll

The 1963 Northern Illinois Huskies football team was an American football team that represented Northern Illinois University in the Interstate Intercollegiate Athletic Conference (IIAC) during the 1963 NCAA College Division football season. In their eighth year under head coach Howard Fletcher, the Huskies compiled a perfect 10–0 record, won the IIAC championship, and outscored opponents by 337 to 97. They appeared in the Mineral Water Bowl, defeating Southwest Missouri State. The Associated Press recognized the team as the 1963 small college national champion. However, the United Press International recognized Delaware as the small college champion. Northern Illinois played home games at the 5,500-seat Glidden Field on the east end of campus in DeKalb, Illinois.

Senior quarterback George Bork broke several national passing records, including single-season records for passing yardage (3,077), passing touchdowns (32), passes attempted (374), and completions (244). He also set single-game records for passes attempted (67), completions (43), and passing touchdowns (7). He was voted the team's most valuable player for the second consecutive year.

== Schedule ==
Date	Opponent	Rank	Site	Result	Attendance	Source
September 14	Whitewater State*		Glidden Field; DeKalb, IL	W 55–7	6,000	
September 21	at Winona State*		Maxwell Field; Winona, MN	W 61–0	4,000	
September 28	at Northeast Missouri State*		Stokes Stadium; Kirksville, MO	W 21–12	6,800	
October 5	Omaha*		Glidden Field; DeKalb, IL	W 18–7	9,007	
October 12	Hillsdale*		Glidden Field; DeKalb, IL	W 19–13	9,103	
October 19	Illinois State Normal	No. 1	Glidden Field; DeKalb, IL	W 43–0	9,767	
October 26	at Eastern Illinois	No. 1	Lincoln Field; Charleston, IL	W 43–0	6,803	
November 2	Western Illinois	No. 1	Glidden Field; DeKalb, IL	W 29–22	10,177	
November 9	at Central Michigan	No. 1	Mount Pleasant, MI	W 27–22	11,000–11,164	
November 30	vs. Southwest Missouri State*	No. 1	Roosevelt Field; Excelsior Springs, MO (Mineral Water Bowl)	W 21–14	6,500	
*Non-conference game; Rankings from AP Poll released prior to the game
