= 1965 Northern Illinois Huskies football team =

American college football season

1965 Northern Illinois Huskies football

IIAC champion

Mineral Water Bowl, L 20–37 vs. North Dakota
- Conference: Interstate Intercollegiate Athletic Conference
- Record: 9–1 (4–0 IIAC)
- Head coach: Howard Fletcher (10th season)
- Offensive coordinator: Bill Peck (1st season)
- MVP: Bob Stark
- Captains: Ron Christian; Terry Henigan
- Home stadium: Glidden Field; Huskie Stadium

1965 Interstate Intercollegiate Athletic Conference football standings
	Conf.					Overall
Team	W		L		T	W		L		T
Northern Illinois $	4	–	0	–	0	9	–	1	–	0
Central Michigan	3	–	1	–	0	5	–	5	–	0
Western Illinois	2	–	2	–	0	4	–	5	–	0
Eastern Illinois	1	–	3	–	0	3	–	5	–	0
Illinois State	0	–	4	–	0	0	–	9	–	0
$ – Conference champion

The 1965 Northern Illinois State Huskies football team represented Northern Illinois University as a member of the Interstate Intercollegiate Athletic Conference (IIAC) during the 1965 NCAA College Division football season. Led by tenth-year head coach Howard Fletcher, the Huskies compiled an overall record of 9–1 with a mark of 4–0 in conference play, winning the IIAC title. Northern Illinois was invited to the Mineral Water Bowl, where they lost to North Dakota. The Huskies playing their first three home games at Glidden Field before opening the newly constructed Huskie Stadium on November 6 against Illinois State.

== Schedule ==
Date	Opponent	Rank	Site	Result	Attendance	Source
September 18	Whitewater State*		Glidden Field; DeKalb, IL	W 28–14		
September 25	Omaha*		Glidden Field; DeKalb, IL	W 28–13		
October 2	at Central Michigan		Mount Pleasant, MI	W 19–14	3,500	
October 9	Northeast Missouri State*		Glidden Field; DeKalb, IL	W 22–20		
October 16	at Bradley*		Peoria, IL	W 27–7		
October 23	at Milwaukee*		Shorewood Stadium; Milwaukee, WI	W 38–12		
October 30	at Eastern Illinois	No. 8	Lincoln Field; Charleston, IL	W 20–11		
November 6	Illinois State^{†}	No. 7	Huskie Stadium; DeKalb, IL	W 48–6	18,858	
November 13	Western Illinois	No. 8	Huskie Stadium; DeKalb, IL	W 40–13	12,587	
November 27	vs. North Dakota*	No. 6	Roosevelt Field; Excelsior Springs, MO (Mineral Water Bowl)	L 20–37	4,000–5,000	
*Non-conference game; ^{†}Homecoming; Rankings from AP Poll released prior to the game
