= Jerome Persell =

American football player

Profile
- Position: Running back

Personal information
- Born: c. 1958; Detroit, Michigan, U.S.
- Listed height: 5 ft 10 in (1.78 m)
- Listed weight: 182 lb (83 kg)

Career information
- High school: Detroit Northern
- College: Western Michigan (1976–1978)

Jerome Persell (born c. 1958) is a former American football running back. He grew up on the north side of Detroit and attended Detroit Northern High School, where he was an all-city back averaging seven yards per carry. He played college football for the Western Michigan Broncos football team from 1976 to 1978. He ranked among the top ten major-college players in rushing yardage in each of his three years at Western Michigan, ranking fourth in 1976 with 1,505 yards (and 19 touchdowns ), fifth in 1977 with 1,339 yards (and 14 touchdowns), and tenth in 1978 with 1,346 yards (and six touchdowns in 1978). He gained an average of 136.2 yards per game during his college career, a figure that ranked fifth in Division I-A history at the time. He was the Mid-American Conference (MAC) Offensive Player of the Year three consecutive years from 1976 to 1978. and was inducted into the Western Michigan Athletics Hall of Fame in 1999.

== See also ==
- Western Michigan Broncos football statistical leaders#Rushing
