= Garrett Wolfe =

American gridiron football player (born 1984)

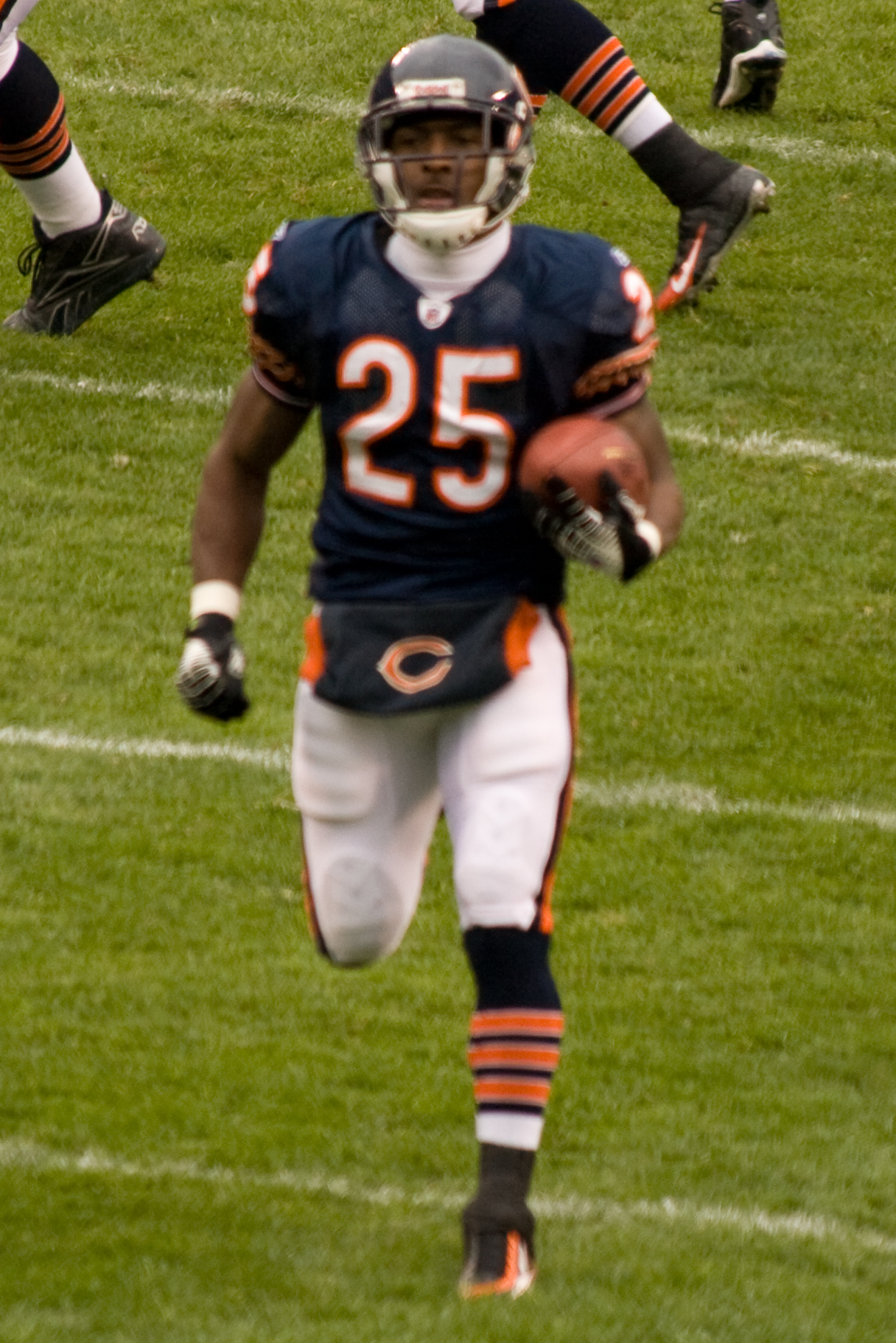
- Wolfe with the Chicago Bears in 2008

No. 25
- Position: Running back

Personal information
- Born: August 17, 1984 (age 42); Chicago, Illinois, U.S.
- Listed height: 5 ft 7 in (1.70 m)
- Listed weight: 185 lb (84 kg)

Career information
- High school: Holy Cross (IL)
- College: Northern Illinois
- NFL draft: 2007: 3rd round, 93rd overall pick

Career history
- Chicago Bears (2007–2010); Omaha Nighthawks (2011–2012); Montreal Alouettes (2012)*
- * Offseason or practice squad member only

Awards and highlights
- Third-team All-American (2006); MAC Most Valuable Player (2006); MAC Offensive Player of the Year (2006); 3× First-team All-MAC (2004-2006)

Career NFL statistics
- Rushing attempts: 72
- Rushing yards: 282
- Rushing touchdowns: 1
- Receptions: 11
- Receiving yards: 129
- Stats at Pro Football Reference

Garrett Wolfe (born August 17, 1984) is an American former professional football player who was a running back in the National Football League (NFL). He was selected by the Chicago Bears in the third round of the 2007 NFL draft. He played his college football for the Northern Illinois Huskies.

== Early life ==
A Chicago native, Wolfe attended Holy Cross High School in River Grove, Illinois. He rushed for 4,311 yards and 56 touchdowns during the final two years of his high school career. Wolfe set eleven school records during his tenure at Holy Cross and earned numerous honors from various Chicago media sources, including the Chicago Tribune and Chicago Sun-Times.

== College career ==
Wolfe spent most of his first year at Northern Illinois University on the sideline. He began to make significant progress his sophomore year when he became the team's starting running back and one of the most productive rushers in the nation. Wolfe managed to solidify his performance towards the end of the 2004 season, rushing for over 1,400 yards and scoring 17 touchdowns during the last seven games of the season.

His 2005 season was almost as successful. He earned national recognition with stout performances against the Michigan Wolverines and Northwestern Wildcats. Wolfe's season was hindered by a knee injury, which forced him to miss three games. Nevertheless, his achievements were recognized with an All-American selection and by being voted the Huskies' Most Valuable Player.

Wolfe started the 2006 season on a productive note by accumulating 285 total yards (171 rushing, 114 receiving) against the Ohio State Buckeyes, who were at the time the nation's top ranked team. He finished the season with an NCAA-high 1,928 rushing yards while averaging 157 yards per game.

== Professional career ==
=== Chicago Bears ===
The Chicago Bears selected Wolfe in the 2007 NFL draft's third round, with the 93rd overall selection. On May 15, 2007, Wolfe became the first of his draft class to sign, inking a four-year deal with the Bears. Financial terms were undisclosed.

Wolfe was placed on season-ending injured reserve with a torn hamstring on December 12, 2008. He finished the 2008 season with 15 carries for 69 yards.

Wolfe became a restricted free-agent after the 2010 season, but the Bears did not offer him a contract. He remained unsigned throughout the 2011 NFL lockout.

In May 2011, Wolfe was arrested and charged with retail theft, disorderly conduct, assault of a police officer and resisting an officer with violence following an altercation at a Miami Beach nightclub. All charges against Wolfe were later dropped.

=== Omaha Nighthawks ===
In late 2011, Wolfe signed with the Omaha Nighthawks.

=== Montreal Alouettes ===
On May 14, 2012, Wolfe signed with the Montreal Alouettes.

== Career statistics ==
=== NFL ===
Chicago Bears		Rushing					Receiving					Kickoff returns					Defense
Season	Games	Att	Yds	Avg	Lg	TD	Rec	Yds	Avg	Lg	TD	Ret	Yds	Avg	Lg	TD	Solo	Assist	Total Tackles
2007	13	31	85	2.7	25	0	9	117	13.0	33	0	1	27	27.0	27	0	5	0	5
2008	13	15	69	4.6	38	0	0	0	-.-	0	0	5	98	19.6	33	0	15	1	16
2009	8	22	120	5.0	36	1	2	12	6.0	12	0	0	0	-.-	0	0	8	2	10
2010	7	0	0	-.-	0	0	0	0	-.-	0	0	0	0	-.-	0	0	8	2	10
Total	41	68	274	4.0	38	1	11	129	11.7	33	0	6	125	20.8	33	0	36	5	41

=== College ===
NIU		Rushing					Receiving					Kickoff returns					Defense
Season	Games	Att	Yds	Avg	Lg	TD	Rec	Yds	Avg	Lg	TD	Ret	Yds	Avg	Lg	TD	Solo	Assist	Tackle
2004	11	256	1,656	6.5	84	18	10	117	11.7	40	3	0	0	0.0	0	0	0	0	0
2005	9	243	1,580	6.5	76	16	20	222	11.1	59	1	0	0	0	0	0	0	0	0
2006	12	289	1,976	6.6	75	18	26	247	9.5	65	1	0	0	0	0	0	0	0	0
Total	32	787	5,136	6.5	84	52	56	586	10.5	65	5	0	0	0	0	0	0	0	0

== See also ==
- List of NCAA Division I FBS career rushing touchdowns leaders
- List of NCAA major college football yearly rushing leaders
