= Chad Spann =

American football player (born 1988)

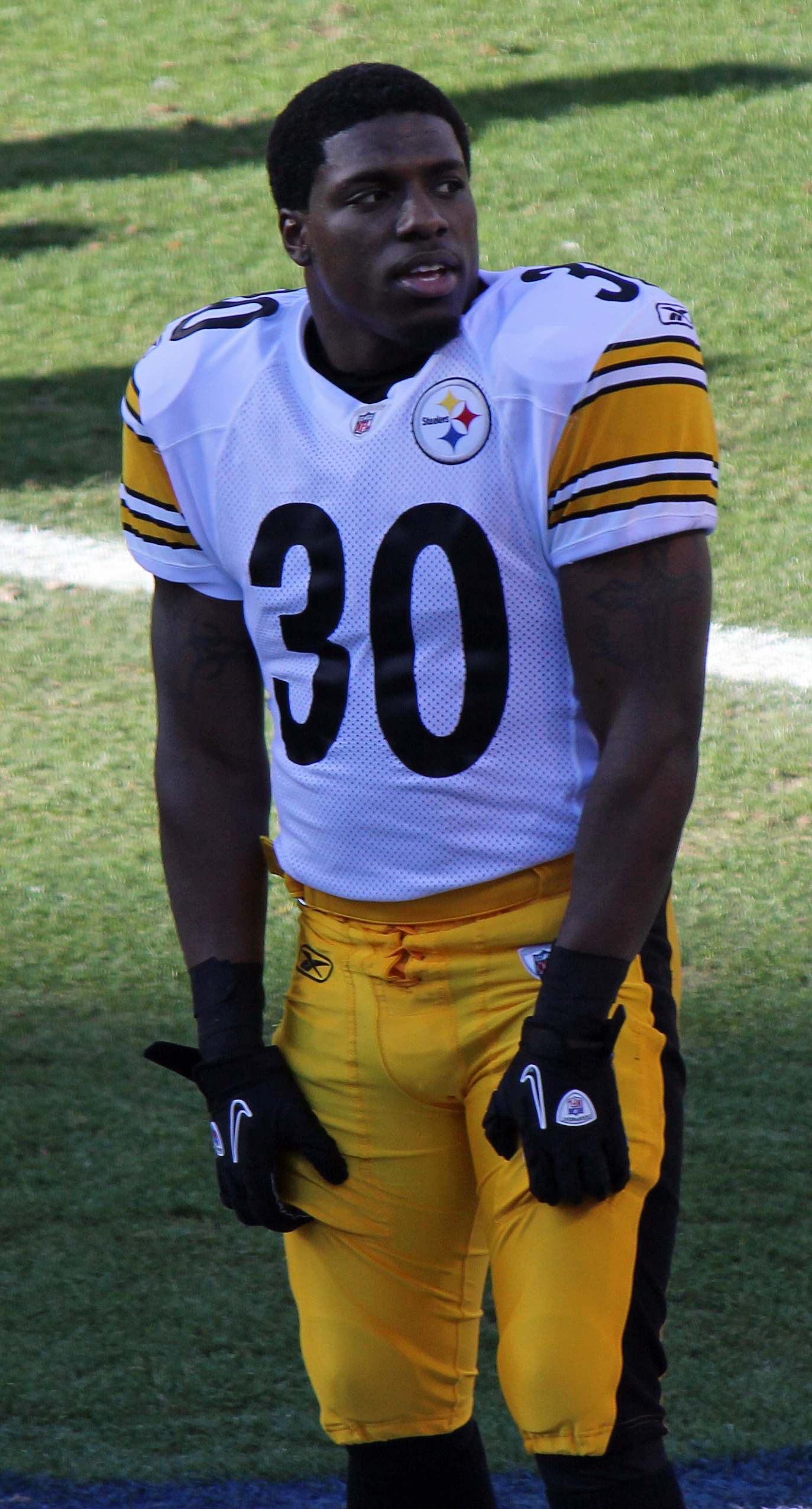
- Spann with the Pittsburgh Steelers in 2011

No. 41, 32, 30
- Position: Running back

Personal information
- Born: August 4, 1988 (age 38); Indianapolis, Indiana, U.S.
- Listed height: 5 ft 9 in (1.75 m)
- Listed weight: 210 lb (95 kg)

Career information
- High school: North Central (Indianapolis)
- College: Northern Illinois
- NFL draft: 2011: undrafted

Career history
- Indianapolis Colts (2011)*; Tampa Bay Buccaneers (2011)*; Pittsburgh Steelers (2011); Omaha Nighthawks (2012); New York Jets (2013)*; Houston Texans (2013); Saskatchewan Roughriders (2015)
- * Offseason or practice squad member only

Awards and highlights
- 2× First-team All-MAC (2009–2010); MAC Most Valuable Player (2010); MAC Offensive Player of the Year (2010)
- Stats at Pro Football Reference

Chad Spann (born August 4, 1988) is an American former professional football player who was a running back in the National Football League (NFL). He played college football for the Northern Illinois Huskies and was signed by the Indianapolis Colts of the National Football League (NFL) as an undrafted free agent in 2011.

In 2010, as a college senior, he rushed for 1,388 yards, led the nation with 22 rushing touchdowns, and contributed to the Huskies first 11-win season.

== Early life ==
Spann attended North Central High School in Indianapolis, where he was a first-team all-state selection his senior season. He holds the school single-season and career rushing yardage and touchdown records.

== College career ==
As a college player, Spann established a new single-season touchdown record for Northern Illinois. Spann received the Vern Smith Leadership Award given by the Mid-American Conference.

=== College highlights ===
- 2010 Vern Smith Leadership Award Winner
- 2010 MAC Offensive Player of the Year
- 2x 1st Team All MAC
- Back to Back 1000 yd seasons
- Led nation in rushing TDs (2010)
- Second on NIU's all-time list for career rushing touchdowns
- Walter Camp Foundation National Player of the Week (9/25)

=== College statistics ===
Year	Team	Att	Yards	Avg	Long	TD
2007	Northern Illinois	11	61	5.5	14	0
2008	Northern Illinois	88	429	4.9	55	8
2009	Northern Illinois	179	1,038	5.8	79	19
2010	Northern Illinois	258	1,388	5.4	79	22
Career		536	2,916	5.4	79	48

== Professional career ==
=== Indianapolis Colts ===
On July 29, 2011, he signed with the Indianapolis Colts as an undrafted free agent. On September 4, 2011, he was placed on injured reserve due to a hamstring injury. On September 6, 2011, he received an injury settlement.

=== Tampa Bay Buccaneers ===
On October 18, 2011, he signed with the Tampa Bay Buccaneers to join the practice squad. On November 7, 2011, he was released from the practice squad.

=== Pittsburgh Steelers ===
On January 4, 2012, he signed with the Pittsburgh Steelers. On January 8, 2012, he played in the Steelers' playoff loss to the Denver Broncos. On May 2, 2012, he was released.

=== New York Jets ===
Spann was signed by the New York Jets on July 27, 2013. He was released on August 26, 2013.

=== Houston Texans ===
On December 10, 2013, Spann signed with the Houston Texans. He played in one game for the Texans. He was released on May 15, 2014.

=== Saskatchewan Roughriders ===
Spann was signed to the Saskatchewan Roughriders' practice roster on September 9, 2015. He was promoted to the active roster on October 23. He played in one game for the Roughriders in 2015, rushing twice for 17 yards. He suffered a torn Achilles while with the Roughriders. He was released by the team on December 15, 2015.

== See also ==
- List of college football yearly rushing leaders
