= Mark Kellar =

American football player (1952–2023)

No. 39
- Position: Running back

Personal information
- Born: July 17, 1952; Chicago, Illinois, U.S.
- Died: November 23, 2023 (aged 71)
- Listed height: 6 ft 0 in (1.83 m)
- Listed weight: 225 lb (102 kg)

Career information
- High school: Irving (Carpentersville, Illinois)
- College: Northern Illinois
- NFL draft: 1974: 6th round, 155th overall pick

Career history
- Chicago Fire (1974); Chicago Winds (1975); San Antonio Wings (1975); Minnesota Vikings (1976–1978)

Awards and highlights
- Northern Illinois Huskies No. 31 retired
- Stats at Pro Football Reference

Mark Peter Kellar (July 17, 1952 – November 23, 2023) was an American professional football running back who played three seasons with the Minnesota Vikings of the National Football League (NFL). He was selected by the Vikings in the sixth round of the 1974 NFL draft. He played college football at Northern Illinois University. Kellar was also a member of the Chicago Fire, Chicago Winds, and San Antonio Wings of the World Football League (WFL).

== Early life ==
Kellar earned two varsity letters in football, two in basketball and three in track at Irving Crown High School in Carpentersville, Illinois. He finished third in the state discus throw his senior year. He also earned All-Tri-County Conference honours in all three sports. Kellar was part of the inaugural class of inductees into the Dundee-Crown Athletic Hall of Fame in 2004.

== College career ==
Kellar played for the Northern Illinois Huskies from 1971 to 1973. He led NCAA Division I-A in rushing yards with 1,719 in 1973. He set a school record for career rushing yards with 3,745 and also scored 33 touchdowns. Kellar played in the North-South Shrine Game his senior year in 1973. He was a three-time team co-MVP from 1971 to 1973 and was voted Huskies quad-captain in 1973. Kellar was also named an Honorable Mention All-American by the Associated Press, United Press International, Football News and Kodak during his college career. He was named to the All-Time Huskie Stadium Team in 1995 and the Huskies' All-Century Team in 1999. His jersey number 31 has been retired by the Huskies and he was inducted into the Northern Illinois University Athletics Hall of Fame in 1983.

== Professional career ==
Kellar was selected by the Minnesota Vikings of the NFL in the sixth round with the 155th overall pick in the 1974 NFL draft. He was selected by the Chicago Fire of the WFL in the seventh round (82nd overall) of the 1974 WFL Draft. He rushed for 778 yards and nine touchdowns on 189 attempts during the 1974 season. Kellar also accumulated 28 receptions for 342 yards and six touchdowns. He signed with the WFL's Chicago Winds in 1975. He recorded 179 yards and two touchdowns on 62 rushing attempts during the 1975 season. Kellar also accrued 19 receptions for 181 yards. The Winds folded only a few months into the 1975 season. He then signed with the San Antonio Wings of the WFL and played for them during the remainder of the 1975 season. He was signed by the Minnesota Vikings in 1976 and played in 33 games for the team from 1976 to 1978. Kellar then retired from football.

== Personal life and death ==
Kellar's brother Scott also played football at Northern Illinois University and in the National Football League.

Mark Kellar died November 23, 2023, at the age of 71.

== See also ==
- List of NCAA major college football yearly rushing leaders
