= George Bork =

American football player (1942–2026)

Profile
- Position: Quarterback

Personal information
- Born: February 8, 1942; Mount Prospect, Illinois, U.S.
- Died: May 27, 2026 (aged 84)

Career information
- College: Northern Illinois

Career history
- 1964, 1966–1967: Montreal Alouettes
- 1968–1969: Chicago Owls

Awards and highlights
- 2× First-team Little All-American (1962, 1963); 2× IIAC Player of the Year (1962, 1963); Northern Illinois University Athletics Hall of Fame; Northern Illinois Huskies No. 11 retired
- College Football Hall of Fame

George Bork (February 8, 1942 – May 27, 2026) was an American professional football player for the Montreal Alouettes of the Canadian Football League (CFL) in the 1960s. He played college football for the Northern Illinois Huskies.

== Biography ==
The 6 ft 1 in (1.85 m), 185-pound (84 kg) Bork rewrote the Northern Illinois University football record book with some help from end Hugh Rohrschneider during his junior and senior years at the DeKalb school. In 1962, Bork broke 14 college passing records ranging from yardage gained to best completion percentage. The following year, he bettered 10 of his records, tied one and set nine more for a total of 20. He also set a record of 244 pass completions during the 1963 NIU season.

Bork was the first college quarterback at any level to throw for 3,000 yards in one season. Bork first played football at Arlington High School, where he was an all-conference selection. Offered a basketball scholarship to Michigan, the athlete turned it down because he wanted to play football.

He played in 1964 to 1967 with the Montreal Alouettes in the Canadian Football League, while with the Alouettes he worked as a gym teacher at Sir Winston Churchill High School in Ville St-Laurent he then signed with the Chicago Owls of the Continental Football League in 1968.

He was inducted into the College Football Hall of Fame in 1999.

George Bork died on May 27, 2026, at the age of 84.
