= Glidden Field =

US athletic venue

- Interactive map of Glidden Field
- Location: Northern Illinois University; Lucinda Ave. and Gilbert Way; DeKalb, Illinois, U.S.
- Coordinates: 41.9354°N 88.7616°W
- Owner: Northern Illinois University
- Operator: Northern Illinois University
- Capacity: 5,500 (final; 1965)
- Surface: Natural grass

Construction
- Opened: 1903
- Closed: October 9, 1965; 61 years ago

Tenant
- NIU Huskies (NCAA) (1903–1965)

DeKalb (the United States)
DeKalb (Illinois)

Glidden Field was an athletic venue located on the campus of Northern Illinois University in DeKalb, Illinois. Opened in 1903, it was the home field of the Northern Illinois Huskies, primarily for football and track and field.

== Location ==
Glidden Field was located on the east end of campus, bordered by Lucinda Avenue to the north and Gilbert Way (along with Gilbert Hall and Still Gym) to the west; the Kishwaukee River provided a natural border to the east. The playing field had a conventional north–south alignment at an elevation of 850 feet (260 m) above sea level.

== About ==
The field dated back to NIU's origins, as the site originally was used as a harness racing track for the annual DeKalb Agricultural Fair. Joseph Glidden, a prominent farmer in the area and community benefactor, donated the land to help the institution expand. It was quickly put to use as a recreational field for the university's sports teams. Early iterations of the field included a covered grandstand boasting "400 strong" supporters in a 1904 football game. During the 1920s, the field was encircled by a cinder track, and even more bleachers were added after World War II.

Northern Illinois' football accomplishments, such as winning three consecutive Interstate Intercollegiate Athletic Conference championships and a national title, in the late 1950s and early 1960s prompted not only over-capacity crowds (some as large as 10,000), but also talks of a new stadium to accommodate the team's needs.

In 1964, construction began on Huskie Stadium for use at the start of the 1965 football season, but constant delays with the construction crew, and prolonged cold weather from the previous winter, kept the Huskies at Glidden Field for the first three home games of the season. After Huskie Stadium was completed, the bleachers and track were removed from Glidden and it became a public park.

The site is now shared by the Jack Arends Visual Arts Hall and the Boutell Memorial Music Hall.
