= Northern Illinois Huskies football =

American college football program

2026 Northern Illinois Huskies football team
- First season: 1899; 127 years ago
- Athletic director: Sean Frazier
- Head coach: Rob Harley (Interim); 1st season, 0–4 (.000)
- Location: DeKalb, Illinois
- Stadium: Huskie Stadium (capacity: 23,595)
- Field: Brigham Field
- NCAA division: Division I FBS
- Conference: Mountain West
- Colors: Cardinal and black
- All-time record: 622–541–51 (.533)
- Bowl record: 6–10 (.375)

Small college national championships
- 1963

Conference championships
- IIAC: 1938, 1944 IIAC: 1951, 1963, 1964, 1965 MAC: 1983, 2011, 2012, 2014, 2018, 2021

Division championships
- MAC West: 2001, 2002, 2004, 2005, 2010, 2011, 2012, 2013, 2014, 2015, 2018, 2021
- Consensus All-Americans: 2
- Rivalries: Ball State (rivalry)
- Fight song: "Huskie Fight Song"
- Mascot: Victor E. Huskie
- Marching band: The Pride of the Midwest
- Website: NIUHuskies.com

The Northern Illinois Huskies football team are a college football program representing Northern Illinois University (NIU) in the Football Bowl Subdivision (FBS) of college football. NIU football plays its home games at Huskie Stadium on the campus of the Northern Illinois University in DeKalb, Illinois.

The Huskies completed the most recent of their two stints in the Mid-American Conference (MAC) in the 2025 season, having first played in the conference from 1975 to 1985 before returning in 1997. They won six MAC championships – in 1983, 2011, 2012, 2014, 2018, and 2021. NIU has played in 12 postseason bowl games since 2004, most notably the 2013 Orange Bowl.

The Huskies moved to the Mountain West Conference as a football-only member in 2026.

== History ==
=== Early history ===
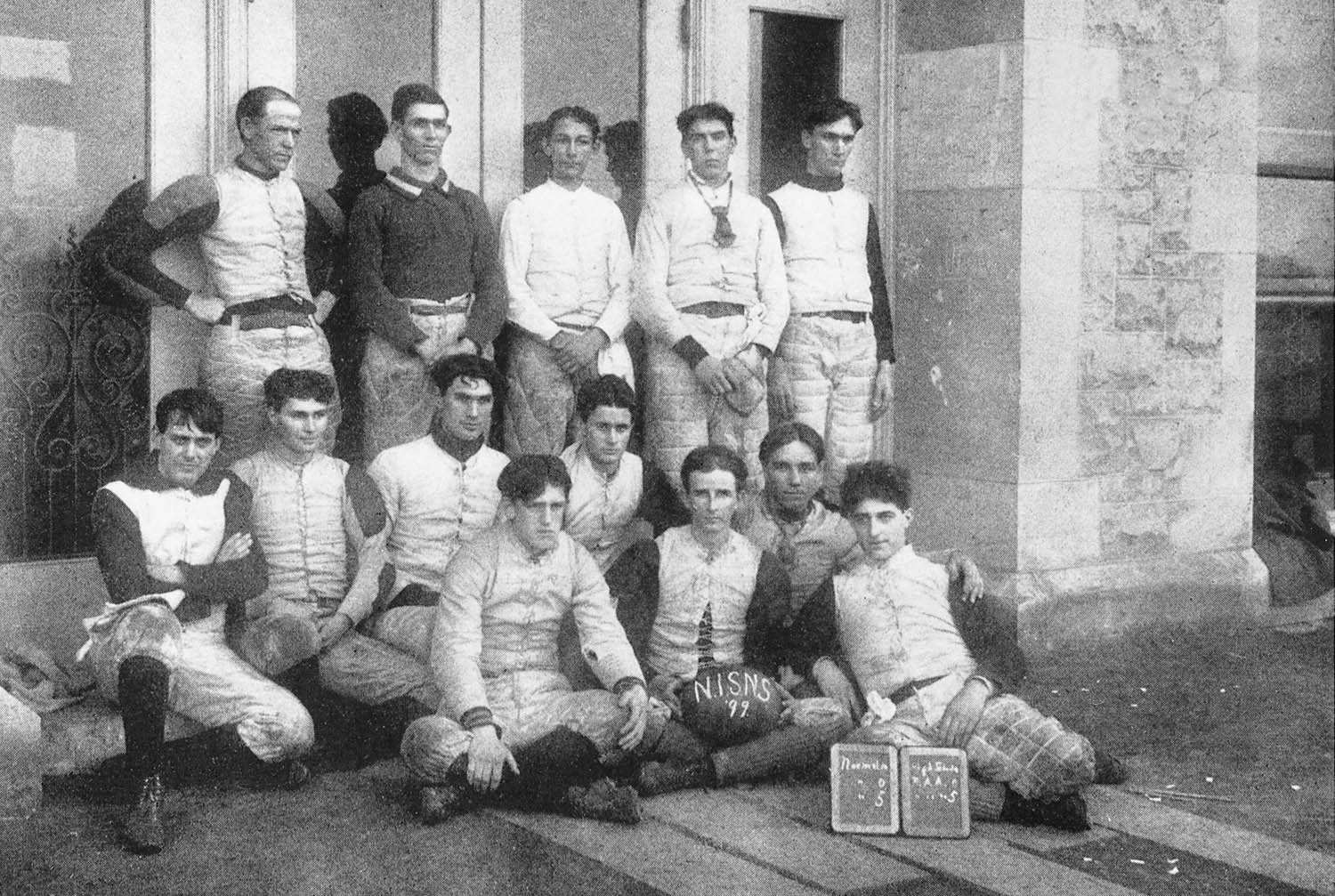
Northern Illinois first football team of 1899

NIU's football program was established in the late 19th century, playing its first ever game against DeKalb High School in 1899 and was led by coach John L. Keith to the team's first ever victory. NIU started in the independent scene from 1899 through 1919 before joining the Illinois Intercollegiate Athletic Conference. The team became independent again in 1925. NIU returned to the Illinois Intercollegiate Athletic Conference in 1928 and finished the season winless for the first time. In 1929 however, Chick Evans took over as the head football coach and immediately twisted the downhill fate of his team as he led his squad to a 6–1–1 record. Evans led the Huskies to continuous winning seasons since his take over, and his efforts paid off in 1938 as NIU captured the Illinois Intercollegiate Athletic Conference Championship, the team's first title. He followed it up with three more championships (1941, '44, and '46) and even led the Huskies' to a back-to-back bowl game appearance in 1946 and 1947.

In 1950, the Illinois Intercollegiate Athletic Conference, which had dwindled down to only five members (NIU, SIU, EIU, WIU, and ISU) accepted its first members from out of state and changed its name to the Interstate Intercollegiate Athletic Conference. With the exception of the spotless season (9–0–0) in 1951 that earned the team a 5th conference title, NIU failed to make a decent showing during the first few years in the newly named conference. Howard Fletcher though had other plans as he picked up the pieces of the miserable 0–8–1 season from Robert Kahler in 1956. The Huskies' had a slow progress that picked up in the late 1950s. The team's third bowl game appearance in 1962, although a loss, was only the beginning of good things to come as in the following season, the Huskies completed their sixth undefeated season which earned them the Interstate Intercollegiate Athletic Conference Championship, an AP College Division National championship selection, and a ticket to the prestigious Mineral Water Bowl which the team eventually won over Missouri State. The team made it a three-peat championship, adding up the 1964 and 1965 conference titles. NIU became independent from 1966 through '72 before joining the Mid-American Athletic Conference in 1973. The team claimed the MAC title in 1983 then went on to their first Bowl Game in the Division I-A, the California Bowl, which the Huskies won over Cal State-Fullerton. The team left the MAC after the 1985 season and first became independent from 1986 to 1992, then joined the Big West Conference from 1993 through '95, becoming independent again in '96, then finally was admitted back into the Mid-American Conference in 1997.

=== Joe Novak era (1996–2007) ===
Joe Novak took over the Huskies program in December 1995, and coached his first NIU game in September 1996. The first three years of Novak's tenure proved to be tumultuous, as his Huskies squads won a total of three games between 1996 and 1998. Despite this, Novak kept his job and turned the program around. On October 17, 1998, the Huskies broke their epic losing streak, by defeating Central Michigan University 17–6. The student body tore down the goal posts, and carried them down Lincoln Highway, planting the goal posts in a campus lagoon. University president John LaTourette personally paid to have new goal posts installed. In 1999, NIU won 5 games, and in 2000 Novak started a string of seven consecutive winning seasons, going 6–5 in both 2000 and 2001. After a 1–3 start to the 2002 season, fans began to see the fruits of Novak's labor as the team ripped off 7 consecutive wins, and only a 33–30 loss in their final game against rival Toledo prevented a MAC Championship Game appearance.

Optimism was high to start the 2003 season, with 12 returning starters including prospect and future NFL players Michael Turner, Doug Free, Brad Cieslak, P. J. Fleck, Dan Sheldon, Keith Perry, Vinson Reynolds, Akil Grant, Randee Drew, and Travis Moore. On opening weekend, the Huskies beat No. 15 Maryland, 20–13, in overtime. Then, the Huskies traveled to Tuscaloosa and beat No. 21 Alabama, 16–13. After beating Iowa State the following week, the Huskies were rolling and won their first 7 games. Following their week 5 win against Ohio, the first BCS standings were released, and by week 7 the Huskies had climbed to No. 10 overall. Novak and the Huskies could not keep that momentum going, as they lost in week 8 at No. 22 Bowling Green, which also featured the first ever ESPN GameDay appearance for a MAC football game. The Huskies lost one more game in 2003, to Toledo, finishing the year 10–2, unranked, and uninvited to a bowl game.

Novak's 2004 and 2006 teams both went to bowl games. The 2004 team went to the Silicon Valley Classic in San Jose, California and was the first Huskies team to go bowling in 21 years. The Huskies fell behind early, 14–0, to a Troy team that featured DeMarcus Ware, but were able to rally behind future NFL running back Garrett Wolfe and the accurate passing of Josh Haldi to win, 34–21. In 2006, Wolfe and company returned to a bowl, the Poinsettia Bowl, against TCU and lost 37–7.

Novak's final year was a tough one, winning only 2 games and finishing at the bottom of the MAC West. Overall Novak won 63 games as the Huskies' head coach. Novak died on July 28, 2026, at the age of 81.

The Huskies finished the 2007 season having produced a 1,000-yard rusher in the previous nine consecutive seasons, starting in 1999, including rushers Thomas Hammock, Michael Turner, Garrett Wolfe and Justin Anderson.

=== Jerry Kill era (2008–2010) ===
Jerry Kill was hired to replace the retiring Joe Novak after the 2007 season. Kill was previously the head coach at Southern Illinois University, an FCS football program, making NIU his first FBS head coaching job. Kill led the Huskies to three straight bowl appearances in his three years as head coach, all three with quarterback Chandler Harnish. In 2010, Kill led the Huskies to the MAC Championship, but NIU fell to Miami (Ohio). On December 5, 2010, the day after NIU's loss in the MAC Championship, Kill tendered his immediate resignation and accepted the position of head coach of the Minnesota Golden Gophers. Coach Kill's resignation would leave harsh feelings in the Huskie locker room, as the players learned of his resignation through email. This left the Huskies without a coach, less than two weeks before they were to appear in the 2010 Humanitarian Bowl.

Despite Kill's departure, the Huskies won their bowl game, defeating Fresno State in the 2010 Humanitarian Bowl.

=== Dave Doeren era (2011–2012) ===
On December 13, 2010, Dave Doeren was named the new head coach. The Huskies went 11–3 in his first season and they won their first MAC Championship since 1983 in a 23–20 comeback win against Ohio, while also defeating the Arkansas State Red Wolves in a come-from-behind game in the 2012 GoDaddy.com Bowl.

Inclusive of the 2012 season, NIU had won 10 conference and three division titles, appeared in 13 Division I-A and College Division bowl games (winning five), had accumulated 535 wins, and has an all-time winning percentage of .533.

2012 ended up being another memorable season in DeKalb, with the emergence of quarterback Jordan Lynch. Lynch was replacing Huskie QB Chandler Harnish, the decorated NIU starting QB for the previous three years. There was hope that Lynch would be a good quarterback, but no one could have predicted what Lynch ended up doing in the 2012 campaign. Lynch ended the season passing for 2962 yards, 24 touchdowns with five interceptions. He also ran for 1751 yards and 19 rushing touchdowns. The 1751 rushing yards were the most ever by a quarterback in the FBS at the time, surpassing a record set in 2011 by Denard Robinson of the University of Michigan. Lynch's marquee game was on November 14 against Toledo, where Lynch threw for 407 yards and three touchdowns, while rushing for another 162 yards. Lynch led the Huskies to an 11–1 record, a No. 21 ranking in the BCS poll and their third consecutive MAC West Divisional Championship. In the MAC Championship Game, NIU defeated No. 17 Kent State Golden Flashes 44–37 score in double overtime. Lynch scored the game-winning touchdown in overtime. The win eventually propelled the team to No. 15 in the BCS Standings, granting them their first-ever appearance in a BCS bowl game, the 2013 Orange Bowl against Florida State.

The day after the MAC Championship game, Doeren was hired as the new head coach for North Carolina State University. Rod Carey took over and coached the Huskies in the Orange Bowl, but NIU eventually lost 31–10 to the Seminoles. The Orange Bowl was the first of Carey's six bowl losses: Orange Bowl (2013), Poinsettia Bowl (2013 & 2015), the Boca Raton Bowl (2014 & 2018), and the Quick Lane Bowl (2017).

On September 28, 2024, Doeren coached against NIU for the first time in his career. NC State won the tight matchup, with a 17–24 win.

=== Rod Carey era (2013–2018) ===
Following a bitter end to the 2012 campaign, NIU looked to build their momentum in 2013. In front of two sellout crowds, the Huskies increased their NCAA record home win streak to 26 games. Following the conclusion of the regular season, NIU was poised to bust the BCS yet again. They sat 12–0 after cruising through their schedule, #14 in the BCS Standings, and were sitting above an AQ conference champion. Jordan Lynch became the first Huskie ever to be invited to the Heisman trophy ceremony in New York, finishing 3rd. Following their regular season, heartbreak happened for the Huskies. They lost both their conference championship, as well as their bowl game (Poinsettia Bowl) to finish the season 12–2, leaving Jordan Lynch with a career record of 24–4.

Following the season, 3 Huskies had All-American honors. Jordan Lynch was a first team all purpose AP All American, Jimmie Ward was a first team Sports Illustrated (second team AP), and Tommylee Lewis was an honorable mention (AP).

In 2014, the Huskies had another strong season despite the departure of Heisman finalist Jordan Lynch and NFL draft picks Jimmie Ward and Ken Bishop. NIU beat Big Ten program Northwestern in September and defeated Bowling Green 51–17 in the MAC Championship Game to win their 3rd MAC title in four seasons. They lost the Boca Raton Bowl to Conference USA Champion Marshall 52–23. The Huskies finished 11–3, their 5th consecutive season where they won at least 11 games and received votes in the AP Top 25 poll during the season.

In their 3rd game of 2015, the Huskies narrowly lost to defending National Champion and #1 ranked Ohio State 20–13 as 34.5 point underdogs, in a game that the Huskies did not trail until halfway through the 3rd quarter. NIU rattled off six consecutive wins to start MAC play, including a road win against #20 ranked Toledo, and won the MAC West division title for the 6th consecutive season. NIU ended the season with losses to Bowling Green in the MAC title game (34–14) and Boise State in the Poinsettia Bowl (55–7) where NIU was outgained 654 to 33 yards. Cornerback Shuwan Lurry was selected as a 1st team All-American by several outlets, after finishing the season with an FBS leading nine interceptions.

The following season the Huskies went 5–7, attaining only their 2nd losing season since 2000. In the offseason, Wide Receiver Kenny Golladay was drafted by the Detroit Lions in the 3rd round of the NFL draft after back-to-back 1000 yard receiving seasons for NIU.

On September 16, 2017, the Huskies defeated Nebraska 21–17, giving them a 6–4 record in their last 10 games against Big Ten opponents, 4–1 in their last 5. NIU finished 2017 with an 8–6 record after losing to Duke 36–14 in the Quick Lane Bowl. Defensive lineman Sutton Smith set a Huskie record for sacks (14), and led the nation in tackles for loss (29.5) and quarterback pressures (87). He was named a consensus All-American at the end of the season.

In 2018, NIU clinched its first MAC West division title since 2015. The Huskies defeated Buffalo 30–29 in the MAC Championship game after trailing by 19 points in the 3rd quarter. This was NIU's 4th MAC title since 2011. NIU was defeated by UAB 37–13 in the Boca Raton Bowl, giving NIU their 6th consecutive bowl game loss and 5th bowl game under Rod Carey where they were defeated by at least 21 points. Sutton Smith had another strong season, once again leading the nation in tackles for loss (27) and finishing third in sacks (15). He was named a 1st team All-American for the 2nd straight year by several outlets.

On January 11, 2019, it was announced that Rod Carey had accepted the head coaching position at Temple University after six seasons as NIU's head football coach.

In their search for a new football coach, NIU's potential candidates included Baltimore Ravens RB coach Thomas Hammock (former NIU RB), former Maryland OC Matt Canada (former NIU OC), SMU DC Kevin Kane (former NIU DC), and Wisconsin OC Joe Rudolph.

=== Thomas Hammock era (2019–2025) ===
On January 18, 2019, NIU announced the hiring of Thomas Hammock as the new head football coach. Hammock was a running back for the Huskies from 1999 to 2002 and was most recently the running backs coach for the NFL's Baltimore Ravens from 2014 to 2018. At his first press conference as NIU's head coach, Hammock stated that coaching at NIU "had always been [his] dream."

In Hammock's first year at the helm, the Huskies finished 5–7 including a 4–4 record in MAC play.

In a pandemic shortened 2020 season, NIU finished 0–6 with one of the youngest teams in the nation. This marked their first winless season since 1999.

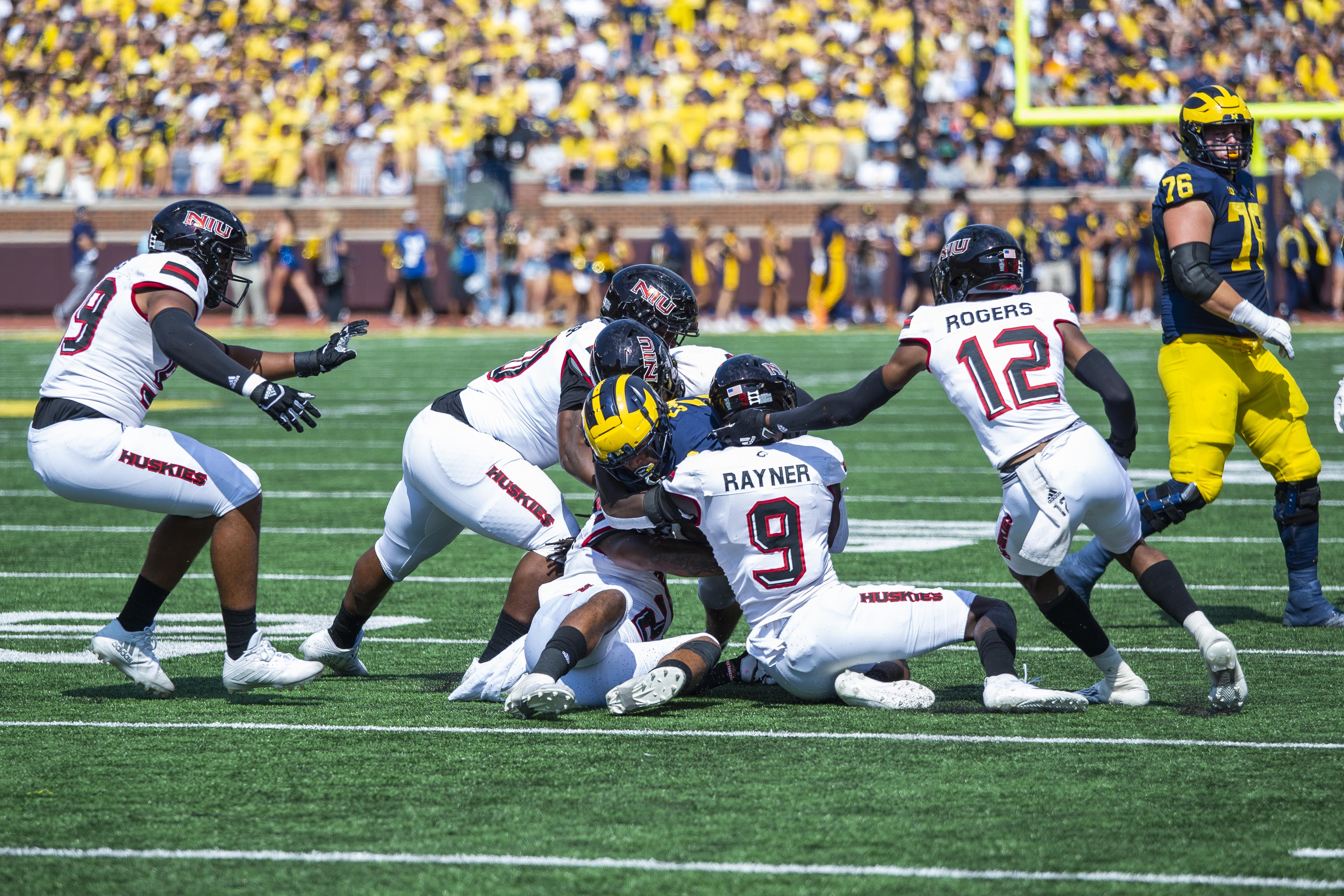
Northern Illinois at Michigan Stadium in 2021

Expectations were low for the 2021 season following a disappointing 2020. Michigan State QB Rocky Lombardi announced that he would be transferring to NIU in December 2020, and he was named the starting QB to enter the season. NIU opened the year as an 18-point underdog to Georgia Tech, but defeated the Yellow Jackets 22–21. This marked their 12th victory over a Power 5 program since 2000 and 8th since 2009. The Huskies claimed their 5th MAC title since 2011 with a 41–23 victory over Kent State. After their win in the MAC championship, NIU was selected to play in the Cure Bowl against Coastal Carolina, a game they lost 47–41.

During the 2024 season, Hammock's sixth year, NIU beat the University of Notre Dame during the Fighting Irish's home opener in South Bend, 16–14, with two interceptions and two blocked kicks. Notre Dame was ranked No. 5 at the time, making it the biggest upset in the history of Huskie football, the school's only top-10 win to date (all-time 1–14 against top 10), and the first ever top-5 win by the Mid-American Conference. NIU finished the season with a double overtime victory over Fresno State in the Famous Idaho Potato Bowl.

Hammock's 7th (and ultimately final season) saw the Huskies failing to capitalize on the success of their last season, going 3–9 (2–6 MAC) with a struggling offense and a hole in the quarterback position. Hammock was later hired by the defending Super Bowl champions, the Seattle Seahawks, to serve the role of running backs coach/senior offensive assistant. Rob Harley was named interim head coach.

== Conference affiliations ==
Northern Illinois has been a member of the following conferences.

- Independent (1899–1921)
- Illinois Intercollegiate Athletic Conference (1922–1925)
- Independent (1926–1927)
- Illinois Intercollegiate Athletic Conference (1928–1965)
- Independent (1966–1974)
- Mid-American Conference (1975–1985)
- Independent (1986–1992)
- Big West Conference (1993–1995)
- Independent (1996)
- Mid-American Conference (1997–2025)
- Mountain West Conference (2026–present)

== Championships ==
=== National championships ===
Year	Division	Coach	Selectors	Record	Conf. record
1963	NCAA College Division	Howard Fletcher	Associated Press	10–0	4–0

=== Conference championships ===
Northern Illinois has won twelve conference championships, 11 outright.

Year	Conference	Coach	Record	Conf. record
1938	Illinois Intercollegiate Athletic Conference	Chick Evans	6–1–1	4–0
1944	Illinois Intercollegiate Athletic Conference	Chick Evans	7–0	3–0
1951	Interstate Intercollegiate Athletic Conference	Chick Evans	9–0	6–0
1963	Interstate Intercollegiate Athletic Conference	Howard Fletcher	10–0	4–0
1964†	Interstate Intercollegiate Athletic Conference	Howard Fletcher	7–2	3–1
1965	Interstate Intercollegiate Athletic Conference	Howard Fletcher	9–1	4–0
1983	Mid-American Conference	Bill Mallory	10–2	8–1
2011	Mid-American Conference	Dave Doeren	11–3	7–1
2012	Mid-American Conference	Dave Doeren	12–1	8–0
2014	Mid-American Conference	Rod Carey	11–3	7–1
2018	Mid-American Conference	Rod Carey	8–6	6–2
2021	Mid-American Conference	Thomas Hammock	9–5	6–2

† Co-champions

=== Division championships ===
In the division era (1997–2023) of the MAC, Northern Illinois won 12 division titles.

Year	Division	Coach	Opponent	CG result
2001†	MAC West	Joe Novak	N/A lost tiebreaker to Toledo	
2002†	MAC West	Joe Novak	N/A lost tiebreaker to Toledo	
2004†	MAC West	Joe Novak	N/A lost tiebreaker to Toledo	
2005	MAC West	Joe Novak	Akron	L 30–31
2010	MAC West	Jerry Kill	Miami	L 21–26
2011†	MAC West	Dave Doeren	Ohio	W 23–20
2012	MAC West	Dave Doeren	Kent State	W 44–37^{2OT}
2013	MAC West	Rod Carey	Bowling Green	L 27–47
2014†	MAC West	Rod Carey	Bowling Green	W 51–17
2015†	MAC West	Rod Carey	Bowling Green	L 14–34
2018	MAC West	Rod Carey	Buffalo	W 30–29
2021†	MAC West	Thomas Hammock	Kent State	W 41–23

† Co-champions

== Bowl games ==
Northern Illinois has played in 16 bowl games, having a record of 6–10.

Season	Bowl	Opponent	Result
1983	California Bowl	Cal State Fullerton	W 20–13
2004	Silicon Valley Classic	Troy	W 34–21
2006	Poinsettia Bowl	TCU	L 7–37
2008	Independence Bowl	Louisiana Tech	L 10–17
2009	International Bowl	South Florida	L 3–27
2010	Humanitarian Bowl	Fresno State	W 40–17
2011	GoDaddy.com Bowl	Arkansas State	W 38–20
2012	Orange Bowl†	Florida State	L 10–31
2013	Poinsettia Bowl	Utah State	L 14–21
2014	Boca Raton Bowl	Marshall	L 23–52
2015	Poinsettia Bowl	Boise State	L 7–55
2017	Quick Lane Bowl	Duke	L 14–36
2018	Boca Raton Bowl	UAB	L 13–37
2021	Cure Bowl	Coastal Carolina	L 41–47
2023	Camellia Bowl	Arkansas State	W 21–19
2024	Famous Idaho Potato Bowl	Fresno State	W 28–20 (2OT)

† New Year's Six

Other bowl games

In years prior to having classifications for college football, Northern Illinois participated in five bowl games that are now considered as "College Division". They played in five bowl games, having a record of 1–4.

Season	Bowl	Opponent	Result
1946	Turkey Bowl	Evansville	L 7–19
1947	Hoosier Bowl	Evansville	L 0–20
1962	Mineral Water Bowl	Adams State	L 20–23
1963	Mineral Water Bowl	Southwest Missouri State	W 21–14
1965	Mineral Water Bowl	North Dakota	L 20–37

== Head coaches ==
Career records of NIU head coaches.

Coach	Tenure	Season(s)	Games	Record	Pct.
John A. H. Keith	1899–1903	5	29	17–7–5	.672
Dixie Fleager	1904	1	5	5–0	1.000
Harry Sauthoff	1905	1	5	3–1–1	.700
Nelson A. Kellogg	1906–1909	4	28	8–17–3	.339
William Wirtz	1910–1916	7	59	33–17–9	.636
No team	1917–1919				
Paul Harrison	1920–1922	3	26	11–14–1	.442
William Muir	1923–1925	3	23	11–9–3	.543
Roland Cowell	1926–1928	3	20	6–11–3	.375
Chick Evans	1929–1954	26	222	132–70–20	.640
Bob Kahler	1955	1	9	0–8–1	.056
Howard Fletcher	1956–1968	13	123	74–48–1	.606
Doc Urich	1969–1970	2	20	6–14	.300
Jerry Ippoliti	1971–1975	5	55	25–29–1	.464
Pat Culpepper	1976–1979	4	44	14–29–1	.330
Bill Mallory	1980–1983	4	44	25–19	.568
Lee Corso	1984	1	11	4–6–1	.409
Jerry Pettibone	1985–1990	6	66	33–32–1	.508
Charlie Sadler	1991–1995	5	55	18–37	.327
Joe Novak	1996–2007	12	139	63–76	.453
Jerry Kill	2008–2010	3	39	23–16	.590
Tom Matukewicz†	2010	1	1	1–0	1.000
Dave Doeren	2011–2012	2	27	23–4	.852
Rod Carey‡	2012–2018	7	81	52–29	.642
Thomas Hammock	2019–2025	7	70	35–47	.427
Rob Harley	2026–				

† Interim head coach for 2010 Humanitarian Bowl

‡ Interim head coach for 2013 Orange Bowl

== Rivalries ==
=== Ball State ===
Northern Illinois University leads the all-time series with Ball State with a record of 26–25–2 through the 2025 season.

== Individual honors ==
=== Retired jerseys ===
NIU has only officially retired one number, #6 for Jordan Lynch. The rest of the four players are honored by the university by "retiring" them.

Northern Illinois Huskies retired jerseys
No.	Player	Pos.	Tenure	No. ret.
6	Jordan Lynch	QB	2010-2013	2026
6	Dave Petzke	SE	1977–1978	
11	George Bork	QB	1960–1963	1983
12	Bob Heimerdinger	QB	1948–1951	1951
31	Mark Kellar	FB	1971–1973	1973

=== College Football Hall of Fame ===
There have been three former NIU players inducted into the College Football Hall of Fame.

Name	Position	Years	Inducted	Ref.
George Bork	QB	1960–1963	1999	
Tom Beck†	QB/HB	1959–1961	2004	
Jordan Lynch	QB	2009–2013	2026	

† Inducted as a coach

=== Heisman Trophy ===
Finishes for Northern Illinois players:

Year	Name	Position	Finish
1963	George Bork	QB	UA
1990	Stacey Robinson	QB	38th
1993	LeShon Johnson	RB	6th
2003	Michael Turner	RB	18th
2006	Garrett Wolfe	RB	11th
2012	Jordan Lynch	QB	7th
2013	Jordan Lynch	QB	3rd

=== Consensus All-Americans ===
- LeShon Johnson, 1993
- Sutton Smith, 2017

=== NCAA Rushing Leaders (By Year) ===
- Mark Kellar Year: 1973 Rushing Yards: 1719
- Stacie Robinson Year 1990 Rushing Touchdowns: 19
- Leshon Johnson Year:1993 Rushing Yards: 1976
- Garret Wolfe Year: 2006 Rushing Yards: 1928
- Chad Spann Year: 2010 Rushing Touchdowns: 22

List of NCAA major college football yearly rushing leaders

== Future non-conference opponents ==
Announced schedules as of August 19, 2026.

2026	2027	2028	2029	2030	2031	2032
at Iowa	South Florida	at Pittsburgh	at Iowa	Western Illinois	at San Diego State	at Missouri
Illinois State	at Nebraska	Rhode Island	at Middle Tennessee	Middle Tennessee		
at Arizona	Stony Brook	at Ohio State	Missouri	BYU		
at Georgia State	at Colorado	at Missouri				
