= List of Eastern Illinois Panthers football seasons =

The following is a list of Eastern Illinois Panthers football seasons for the football team that has represented Eastern Illinois University in NCAA competition.

== Seasons ==
Year	Coach	Overall Record	Conference Record	Standing
1899	Otis Caldwell	0–2	N/A	N/A
1900	Otis Caldwell	3–3	N/A	N/A
1901	Otis Caldwell	6–0–3	N/A	N/A
1902	Thornton Smallwood	2–4	N/A	N/A
1903	Thomas Briggs	4–3–2	N/A	N/A
1904	Joseph Brown	6–1–1	N/A	N/A
1905	Joseph Brown	2–5–1	N/A	N/A
1906	Joseph Brown	3–1–1	N/A	N/A
1907	Joseph Brown	3–1–3	N/A	N/A
1908	Joseph Brown	6–2–1	N/A	N/A
1909	Joseph Brown	0–3	N/A	N/A
1910	Harold Railsback	2–3–1	N/A	N/A
1911	Charles Lantz	4–2	N/A	N/A
Illinois Intercollegiate Athletic Conference (1912–1949)
1912	Charles Lantz	6–1	4–0	1st of 12
1913	Charles Lantz	6–2	5–1	1st of 15
1914	Charles Lantz	8–0–1	5–0–1	1st of 15
1915	Charles Lantz	4–3–1	3–1–1	4th of 18
1916	Charles Lantz	4–3	4–3	7th of 19
1917	Charles Lantz	4–1–1	4–1–1	4th of 18
1918	No Games Played	N/A	N/A	N/A
1919	Charles Lantz	3–5–1	2–4–1	14th of 19
1920	Charles Lantz	2–3	1–3	14th of 21
1921	Charles Lantz	2–5–1	1–5–1	18th of 23
1922	Charles Lantz	4–0–2	3–0–2	3rd of 23
1923	Charles Lantz	4–2–2	3–2–2	9th of 23
1924	Charles Lantz	6–2	5–1	4th of 22
1925	Charles Lantz	4–3–1	3–1	5th of 22
1926	Charles Lantz	3–5–1	2–2	9th of 19
1927	Charles Lantz	5–2	2–1	7th of 16
1928	Charles Lantz	7–1	5–1	1st of 22
1929	Charles Lantz	6–1	5–1	3rd of 23
1930	Charles Lantz	6–1–1	5–1–1	5th of 22
1931	Charles Lantz	3–4	2–3	14th of 22
1932	Charles Lantz	1–7	0–6	19th of 21
1933	Charles Lantz	1–8	1–5	17th of 21
1934	Charles Lantz	3–4	1–4	14th of 20
1935	Winfield Angus	1–7	0–5	18th of 20
1936	Gilbert Carson	4–4	2–4	14th of 21
1937	Gilbert Carson	3–4–1	1–4–1	18th of 21
1938	Harold Ave	5–3	1–3	5th of 8
1939	Gilbert Carson	4–3–1	1–2–1	4th of 5
1940	Gilbert Carson	6–1–1	3–0–1	2nd of 5
1941	Gilbert Carson	0–7	0–4	5th of 5
1942	Clayton Miller	1–6	0–4	5th of 5
1943	No Games Played	N/A	N/A	N/A
1944	Charles Lantz	1–3	1–2	4th of 5
1945	James Goff	2–3–2	1–1–2	4th of 5
1946	Maynard O'Brien	2–6	1–3	4th of 5
1947	Maynard O'Brien	2–6	2–2	3rd of 5
1948	Maynard O'Brien	7–3	4–0	1st of 5
1949	Maynard O'Brien	3–5	2–2	3rd of 5
Interstate Intercollegiate Athletic Conference (1950–1969)
1950	Maynard O'Brien	5–3	2–2	3rd of 7
1951	Rex Darling	4–2–2	2–2–2	4th of 7
1952	Maynard O'Brien	2–7	1–5	7th of 7
1953	Maynard O'Brien	1–8	0–6	7th of 7
1954	Maynard O'Brien	2–6–1	1–4–1	5th of 7
1955	Maynard O'Brien	3–6	1–5	6th of 7
1956	Keith Smith	2–7	1–4	6th of 7
1957	Ralph Kohl	0–8	0–6	7th of 7
1958	Ralph Kohl	2–6	1–5	7th of 7
1959	Ralph Kohl	3–5–1	1–4–1	5th of 7
1960	Ralph Kohl	2–7	1–5	6th of 7
1961	Ralph Kohl	4–3–1	3–2–1	4th of 7
1962	Ralph Kohl	1–7	0–5	5th of 5
1963	Ralph Kohl	2–7	1–3	4th of 5
1964	Ralph Kohl	3–6	1–3	4th of 5
1965	Clyde Biggers	3–5	1–3	4th of 5
1966	Clyde Biggers	1–6–1	1–1–1	2nd of 4
1967	Clyde Biggers	2–6–1	1–2	3rd of 4
1968	Clyde Biggers	4–5	1–2	3rd of 4
1969	Clyde Biggers	2–7	0–3	4th of 4
NCAA College Division Independent (1970–1972)
1970	Clyde Biggers	2–8	N/A	N/A
1971	Clyde Biggers	4–6	N/A	N/A
1972	Jack Dean	1–9	N/A	N/A
NCAA Division II Independent (1973–1977)
1973	Jack Dean	2–9	N/A	N/A
1974	Jack Dean	3–6–1	N/A	N/A
1975	John Konstantinos	3–5–2	N/A	N/A
1976	John Konstantinos	5–6	N/A	N/A
1977	John Konstantinos	1–10	N/A	N/A
Association of Mid–Continent Universities (1978–1984)
1978	Darrell Mudra	12–2	3–2	3rd of 6
1979	Darrell Mudra	7–4	1–4	T-4th of 6
1980	Darrell Mudra	11–3	4–0	1st of 5
1981	Darrell Mudra	6–5	2–1	T-1st of 4
1982	Darrell Mudra	11–1–1	2–0—1	T-1st of 4
1983	Al Molde	9–3	3–0	1st of 4
1984	Al Molde	6–5	2–1	T-1st of 4
Gateway Collegiate Athletic Conference (1985–1991)
1985	Al Molde	6–5	2–3	T-3rd of 6
1986	Al Molde	11–2	5–1	1st of 7
1987	Bob Spoo	5–6	3–3	T-3rd of 7
1988	Bob Spoo	5–6	2–4	T-5th of 7
1989	Bob Spoo	9–4	4–2	T-2nd of 7
1990	Bob Spoo	5–6	3–3	T-3rd of 7
1991	Bob Spoo	4–7	2–4	T-5th of 7
Gateway Football Conference (1992–1995)
1992	Bob Spoo	5–6	2–4	T-4th of 7
1993	Bob Spoo	3–7–1	2–3–1	T-4th of 7
1994	Bob Spoo	6–5	4–2	T-2nd of 7
1995	Bob Spoo	10–2	5–1	T-1st of 7
Ohio Valley Conference (1996–2022)
1996	Bob Spoo	8–4	6–2	T-2nd of 9
1997	Bob Spoo	8–3	5–2	T-2nd of 8
1998	Bob Spoo	6–5	4–3	T-4th of 8
1999	Bob Spoo	2–10	2–5	T-6th of 8
2000	Bob Spoo	8–4	6–1	2nd of 8
2001	Bob Spoo	9–2	6–0	1st of 7
2002	Bob Spoo	8–4	5–1	T-1st of 7
2003	Bob Spoo	4–8	3–5	T-6th of 9
2004	Bob Spoo	5–6	4–4	4th of 9
2005	Bob Spoo	9–3	8–0	1st of 9
2006	Bob Spoo; Mark Hutson (Interim)	8–5	7–1	T-1st of 9
2007	Bob Spoo	8–4	7–1	2nd of 10
2008	Bob Spoo	5–7	3–5	6th of 9
2009	Bob Spoo	8–4	6–2	1st of 9
2010	Bob Spoo	2–9	2–6	7th of 9
2011	Bob Spoo	2–9	1–7	9th of 9
2012	Dino Babers	7–5	6–1	1st of 9
2013	Dino Babers	12–2	8–0	1st of 9
2014	Kim Dameron	5–7	5–3	T-3rd of 9
2015	Kim Dameron	7–5	7–1	2nd of 9
2016	Kim Dameron	6–5	4–4	T-5th of 9
2017	Kim Dameron	6–5	5–3	3rd of 9
2018	Kim Dameron	3–8	3–5	T-6th of 9
2019	Adam Cushing	1–11	1–7	9th of 9
2020	Adam Cushing	1–5	1–5	8th of 8
2021	Adam Cushing	1–10	1–5	T-6th of 7
2022	Chris Wilkerson	2–9	1–4	T-6th of 7
OVC–Big South Football Association (2023–present)
2023	Chris Wilkerson	8–3	4–2	T-3rd of 10
2024	Chris Wilkerson	3–9	2–6	8th of 9
2025	Chris Wilkerson	3–9	2–6	8th of 9
Totals 124 Years; 26 Coaches		575–581–42 (.497)		19 Conf. Championships
