= List of Eastern Illinois Panthers men's basketball head coaches =

The following is a list of Eastern Illinois Panthers men's basketball head coaches. There have been 15 head coaches of the Panthers in their 113-season history.

Eastern Illinois' current head coach is Marty Simmons. He was hired as the Panthers' head coach in March 2021, replacing Jay Spoonhour, whose contract was not renewed after the 2020–21 season.

No.	Tenure	Coach	Years	Record	Pct.
1	1908–1910	Joseph Brown	2	4–6	.400
2	1911–1935 (Note: Eastern Illinois did not field a team for the 1917–18 season.); 1943–1944	Charles Lantz	24	197–208	.486
3	1935–1936	Winfield Angus	1	7–12	.368
4	1936–1942	Gilbert Carson	6	36–72	.333
5	1942–1943	Clayton Miller	1	8–10	.444
6	1944–1946	James Goff	2	20–25	.444
7	1946–1953	Bill Healey	7	136–41	.768
8	1953–1961; 1962–1964	Robert Carey	10	134–108	.554
9	1961–1962; 1964–1967	Rex Darling	4	42–55	.433
10	1967–1968	John Caine	1	9–16	.360
11	1968–1980	Don Eddy	12	208–129	.617
12	1980–2005	Rick Samuels	25	360–360	.500
13	2005–2012	Mike Miller	7	75–130	.366
14	2012–2021	Jay Spoonhour	9	119–157	.431
15	2021–present	Marty Simmons	2	14–48	.226
Totals		15 coaches	113 seasons	1,250–1,227	.505
Records updated through end of 2022–23 season Source
