= Clayton Miller (disambiguation) =

Clayton Miller (1899–1973), was an American football and basketball coach.

Clayton Miller may also refer to:

- Clayton Miller (academic) (fl. from 2006), academic and data scientist
- Clayton Miller (sport shooter) (born 1977), Canadian sports shooter
