= 1942 Eastern Illinois Panthers football team =

American college football season

1942 Eastern Illinois Panthers football
- Conference: Illinois Intercollegiate Athletic Conference
- Record: 1–6 (0–3 IIAC)
- Head coach: Clayton Miller (1st season)
- Home stadium: Schahrer Field

1942 Illinois Intercollegiate Athletic Conference football standings
	Conf.					Overall
Team	W		L		T	W		L		T
Western Illinois $	3	–	0	–	1	5	–	0	–	2
Northern Illinois State	1	–	0	–	2	3	–	2	–	2
Illinois State Normal	2	–	1	–	1	2	–	5	–	1
Southern Illinois	1	–	3	–	0	2	–	4	–	0
Eastern Illinois	0	–	3	–	0	1	–	6	–	0
$ – Conference champion

The 1942 Eastern Illinois Panthers football team represented Eastern Illinois State Teachers College as a member of the Illinois Intercollegiate Athletic Conference (IIAC) during the 1942 college football season. The team was led by first-year head coach Clayton Miller and played their home games at Schahrer Field in Charleston, Illinois. The Panthers finished the season with a 1–6 record overall and a 0–3 record in conference play.

== Schedule ==
Date	Opponent	Site	Result	Source
September 26	Manchester (IN)*	Schahrer Field; Charleston, IL	L 0–20	
October 3	at Indiana State*	Terre Haute, IN	L 0–26	
October 10	Indiana Central*	Schahrer Field; Charleston, IL	W 7–0	
October 17	at Illinois State Normal	Normal, IL (rivalry)	L 0–32	
October 24	Western Illinois^{†}	Schahrer Field; Charleston, IL	L 0–45	
October 31	at Millikin*	James Millikin University Field; Decatur, IL	L 6–56	
November 7	Southern Illinois	Schahrer Field; Charleston, IL	L 7–27	
November 14	at Northern Illinois State	Glidden Field; DeKalb, IL	Cancelled	
*Non-conference game; ^{†}Homecoming
