= Railsback =

Surname

Railsback is a surname. Notable people with the surname include:

- Alexis Railsback (born 1995), American beauty pageant winner
- Dick Railsback (1946–2021), American pole vaulter
- Harold Railsback, football coach for the Eastern Illinois University Panthers in Charleston, Illinois, USA
- Steve Railsback (born 1945), American theatre, film and television actor, born in Dallas, Texas
- Tom Railsback (1932–2020), served in the United States Congress from 1967 to 1983 for Moline, Illinois

== See also ==
- Railsback curve, the physical properties of the piano which affect its acoustics
