= 1953 Michigan State Normal Hurons football team =

American college football season

1953 Michigan State Normal Hurons football
- Conference: Interstate Intercollegiate Athletic Conference
- Record: 7–1–1 (4–1–1 IIAC)
- Head coach: Fred Trosko (2nd season)
- MVP: Robert L. Boyd
- Captain: Robert L. Boyd
- Home stadium: Briggs Field

1953 Interstate Intercollegiate Athletic Conference football standings
	Conf.					Overall
Team	W		L		T	W		L		T
Central Michigan $	5	–	0	–	1	7	–	1	–	1
Western Illinois	5	–	1	–	0	8	–	2	–	0
Michigan State Normal	4	–	1	–	1	7	–	1	–	1
Illinois State Normal	3	–	3	–	0	5	–	4	–	0
Southern Illinois	2	–	4	–	0	2	–	7	–	0
Northern Illinois State	1	–	5	–	0	1	–	8	–	0
Eastern Illinois	0	–	6	–	0	1	–	8	–	0
$ – Conference champion

The 1953 Michigan State Normal Hurons football team represented Michigan State Normal College (renamed Eastern Michigan College in 1956 and Eastern Michigan University in 1959) in the Interstate Intercollegiate Athletic Conference (IIAC) during the 1953 college football season. In their second season under head coach Fred Trosko, the Hurons compiled a 7–1–1 record (4–1–1 against IIAC opponents) and outscored their opponents, 212 to 105. Robert L. Boyd was the team captain. The team's statistical leaders included Bob Middlekauff with 675 yards of total offense, Tom Fagan with 388 rushing yards, and Nick Manych with seven touchdowns and 42 points. Boyd also received the team's most valuable player award.

== Schedule ==
Date	Opponent	Site	Result	Attendance	Source
September 19	at Hope*	Riverview Park; Holland, MI	W 21–6		
September 25	Hillsdale*	Briggs Field; Ypsilanti, MI	W 28–13		
October 3	Wayne*	Briggs Field; Ypsilanti, MI	W 13–6		
October 10	at Eastern Illinois	Lincoln Field; Charleston, IL	W 34–6		
October 17	at Northern Illinois State	Glidden Field; DeKalb, IL	W 20–14	8,000	
October 24	Southern Illinois^{†}	Briggs Field; Ypsilanti, MI	W 37–0		
October 31	at Western Illinois	Hanson Field; Macomb, IL	L 0–20		
November 7	Illinois State Normal	Briggs Field; Ypsilanti, MI	W 27–6		
November 14	Central Michigan	Briggs Field; Ypsilanti, MI (rivalry)	T 33–33		
*Non-conference game; ^{†}Homecoming
