= 1928 Bradley Indians football team =

American college football season

1928 Bradley Indians football
- Conference: Illinois Intercollegiate Athletic Conference
- Record: 7–2 (6–1 IIAC)
- Head coach: Alfred J. Robertson (9th season)
- Captain: Bill Metzger
- Home stadium: Tech Field

1928 Illinois Intercollegiate Athletic Conference football standings
	Conf.					Overall
Team	W		L		T	W		L		T
Eastern Illinois +	5	–	0	–	1	7	–	0	–	1
Millikin +	5	–	0	–	1	6	–	0	–	2
Augustana (IL)	6	–	1	–	0	7	–	1	–	0
Bradley	6	–	1	–	0	7	–	2	–	0
Monmouth (IL)	5	–	1	–	0	6	–	3	–	0
Southern Illinois	3	–	1	–	0	7	–	1	–	2
McKendree	2	–	1	–	0	5	–	5	–	0
Illinois Wesleyan	5	–	3	–	0	5	–	3	–	0
Carthage	2	–	2	–	1	2	–	3	–	2
Lake Forest	1	–	1	–	0	2	–	4	–	1
Illinois College	4	–	5	–	0	4	–	5	–	0
Eureka	3	–	4	–	1	3	–	4	–	1
North Central	2	–	3	–	1	4	–	3	–	2
Mount Morris	2	–	3	–	0	3	–	3	–	1
Western Illinois	2	–	3	–	2	2	–	3	–	3
St. Viator	1	–	3	–	0	3	–	5	–	0
Illinois State Normal	2	–	6	–	0	2	–	6	–	0
Knox (IL)	1	–	4	–	0	3	–	5	–	0
Wheaton (IL)	0	–	2	–	1	3	–	4	–	1
Northern Illinois State	0	–	2	–	1	0	–	6	–	1
Shurtleff	0	–	3	–	1	1	–	4	–	1
Lincoln (IL)	0	–	8	–	0	0	–	8	–	0
+ – Conference co-champions

The 1928 Bradley Indians football team represented Bradley Polytechnic Institute (now known as Bradley University) as a member of the Illinois Intercollegiate Athletic Conference (IIAC) during the 1928 college football season. Led by ninth-year head coach Alfred J. Robertson, the Indians compiled an overall record of 7–2 with a mark of 6–1 in conference play, finishing third in the IIAC.

== Schedule ==
Date	Time	Opponent	Site	Result	Attendance	Source
September 29		Western Illinois	Tech Field; Peoria, IL	W 25–6		
October 6	2:30 p.m.	at Illinois*	Memorial Stadium; Champaign, IL	L 6–33	21,477	
October 13		at Knox (IL)	Galesburg, IL	W 6–0		
October 20		Augustana (IL)	Peoria, IL	W 12–0		
October 27		St. Viator	Peoria, IL	W 32–7		
November 10		Illinois Wesleyan	Peoria, IL	W 6–0		
November 17	2:00 p.m.	at Millikin	J. M. U. athletic field; Decatur, IL	L 6–14		
November 24		McKendree	Peoria, IL	W 39–6		
November 29		Cornell (IA)*	Peoria, IL	W 33–13		
*Non-conference game; All times are in Central time
