= 1945 Northern Illinois State Huskies football team =

American college football season

1945 Northern Illinois State Huskies football
- Conference: Illinois Intercollegiate Athletic Conference
- Record: 4–3 (2–2 IIAC)
- Head coach: Chick Evans (17th season)
- Captains: Al Hodous; Richard Piatt
- Home stadium: Glidden Field

1945 Illinois Intercollegiate Athletic Conference football standings
	Conf.					Overall
Team	W		L		T	W		L		T
Illinois State Normal $	3	–	1	–	0	4	–	3	–	0
Southern Illinois	2	–	1	–	1	4	–	1	–	2
Northern Illinois State	2	–	2	–	0	4	–	3	–	0
Eastern Illinois	1	–	1	–	2	2	–	3	–	2
Western Illinois	0	–	3	–	1	1	–	5	–	1
$ – Conference champion

The 1945 Northern Illinois State Huskies football team represented Northern Illinois State Teachers College—now known as Northern Illinois University—as a member of the Illinois Intercollegiate Athletic Conference (IIAC) during the 1945 college football season. Led by 17th-year head coach Chick Evans, the Huskies compiled an overall record of 4–3 with a mark of 2–2 in conference play, placing third in the IIAC. The team played home games at the 5,500-seat Glidden Field, located on the east end of campus, in DeKalb, Illinois.

== Schedule ==
Date	Opponent	Site	Result	Attendance	Source
October 6	at Wheaton (IL)*	Wheaton, IL	W 7–0		
October 13	Western Illinois^{†}	Glidden Field; DeKalb, IL	W 12–6	3,000	
October 20	at Illinois Wesleyan*	Bloomington, IL	L 0–13		
October 27	at Illinois State Normal	McCormick Field; Normal, IL	L 7–19		
November 3	Elmhurst*	Glidden Field; DeKalb, IL	W 59–0		
November 10	Southern Illinois	Glidden Field; DeKalb, IL	W 13–7		
November 17	at Eastern Illinois	Schahrer Field; Charleston, IL	L 14–19		
*Non-conference game; ^{†}Homecoming
