= 1951 Eastern Illinois Panthers football team =

American college football season

1951 Eastern Illinois Panthers football
- Conference: Interstate Intercollegiate Athletic Conference
- Record: 4–2–2 (2–2–2 IIAC)
- Head coach: Rex Darling (1st season)
- Home stadium: Lincoln Field

1951 Interstate Intercollegiate Athletic Conference football standings
	Conf.					Overall
Team	W		L		T	W		L		T
Northern Illinois State	6	–	0	–	0	9	–	0	–	0
Western Illinois	4	–	1	–	1	7	–	1	–	1
Central Michigan	4	–	2	–	0	5	–	3	–	0
Eastern Illinois	2	–	2	–	2	4	–	2	–	2
Michigan State Normal	2	–	4	–	0	4	–	5	–	0
Illinois State Normal	1	–	4	–	1	3	–	5	–	1
Southern Illinois	0	–	6	–	0	0	–	9	–	0
$ – Conference champion

The 1951 Eastern Illinois Panthers football team represented Eastern Illinois State College (now known as Eastern Illinois University) as a member of the Interstate Intercollegiate Athletic Conference (IIAC) during the 1951 college football season. The team was led by Rex Darling in his first and only season as head coach and played their home games at Lincoln Field in Charleston, Illinois. The Panthers finished the season with a 4–2–2 record overall and a 2–2–2 record in conference play, placing fourth in the IIAC.

== Schedule ==
Date	Opponent	Site	Result	Source
September 29	Northern Illinois State	Lincoln Field; Charleston, IL	L 7–21	
October 6	Michigan State Normal	Lincoln Field; Charleston, IL	W 19–12	
October 13	at Central Michigan	Alumni Field; Mount Pleasant, MI	L 27–59	
October 20	Northwest Missouri State*^{†}	Lincoln Field; Charleston, IL	W 27–21	
October 27	at Southern Illinois	McAndrew Stadium; Carbondale, IL	W 47–19	
November 3	Western Illinois	Lincoln Field; Charleston, IL	T 21–21	
November 10	at Illinois State Normal	McCormick Field; Normal, IL (rivalry)	T 28–28	
November 17	Millikin*	Lincoln Field; Charleston, IL	W 46–6	
*Non-conference game; ^{†}Homecoming
