= 1945 Southern Illinois Maroons football team =

American college football season

1945 Southern Illinois Maroons football
- Conference: Illinois Intercollegiate Athletic Conference
- Record: 4–1–2 (2–1–1 IIAC)
- Head coach: Glenn Martin (6th season)
- Home stadium: McAndrew Stadium

1945 Illinois Intercollegiate Athletic Conference football standings
| | Conf. | | | | | Overall |
| Team | W | | L | | T | W | | L | | T |
|---|---|---|---|---|---|---|---|---|---|---|
| Illinois State Normal $ | 3 | – | 1 | – | 0 | 4 | – | 3 | – | 0 |
| Southern Illinois | 2 | – | 1 | – | 1 | 4 | – | 1 | – | 2 |
| Northern Illinois State | 2 | – | 2 | – | 0 | 4 | – | 3 | – | 0 |
| Eastern Illinois | 1 | – | 1 | – | 2 | 2 | – | 3 | – | 2 |
| Western Illinois | 0 | – | 3 | – | 1 | 1 | – | 5 | – | 1 |
$ – Conference champion

The 1945 Southern Illinois Maroons football team was an American football team that represented Southern Illinois Normal University (now known as Southern Illinois University Carbondale) in the Illinois Intercollegiate Athletic Conference (IIAC) during the 1945 college football season. Under sixth-year head coach Glenn Martin, the team compiled a 4–1–2 record. The team played its home games at McAndrew Stadium in Carbondale, Illinois.

== Schedule ==
| Date | Opponent | Site | Result | Source |
|---|---|---|---|---|
| September 22 | at Arkansas State* | Kays Stadium; Jonesboro, AR | W 6–0 | |
| October 6 | Arkansas State* | McAndrew Stadium; Carbondale, IL | T 6–6 | |
| October 13 | Illinois State Normal | McAndrew Stadium; Carbondale, IL | W 33–19 | |
| October 20 | at Eastern Illinois | Schahrer Field; Charleston, IL | T 0–0 | |
| October 27 | Western Illinois^{†} | McAndrew Stadium; Carbondale, IL | W 13–6 | |
| November 3 | at Northeast Missouri State* | Kirksville, MO | W 13–0 | |
| November 10 | at Northern Illinois State | Glidden Field; DeKalb, IL | L 7–13 | |
*Non-conference game; ^{†}Homecoming
