= Wix Garner =

American sports coach and college athletics administrator

- Garner pictured in Sequel 1943, Western Illinois yearbook

Biographical details
- Born: January 29, 1897; DeKalb, Illinois, U.S.
- Died: February 5, 1978 (aged 81); Highlands County, Florida, U.S.

Playing career

Football
- 1920: Northern Illinois

Basketball
- 1919–1921: Northern Illinois

Baseball
- 1920: Northern Illinois
- Positions: Quarterback (football); Outfielder (baseball)

Coaching career (HC unless noted)

Football
- 1942–1943: Western Illinois
- 1945–1947: Western Illinois

Basketball
- 1941–1942: Western Illinois

Baseball
- 1949–1955: Western Illinois

Administrative career (AD unless noted)
- 1943–1945: Western Illinois

Head coaching record
- Overall: 13–21–4 (football); 4–7 (basketball)

Accomplishments and honors

Championships
- Football; 1 IIAC (1942)

Charles Wix Garner (January 29, 1897 – February 5, 1978) was an American sports coach and college athletics administrator. He served as the head football coach at Western Illinois University in Macomb, Illinois for five seasons, from 1942 to 1943 and 1945 to 1947, compiling a record of 13–21–4.

== Head coaching record ==
=== Football ===
Year	Team	Overall	Conference	Standing	Bowl/playoffs
Western Illinois Leathernecks (Illinois Intercollegiate Athletic Conference) (1942–1943)
1942	Western Illinois	5–0–2	3–0–1	1st	
1943	Western Illinois	1–6	0–2	3rd	
Western Illinois Leathernecks (Illinois Intercollegiate Athletic Conference) (1945–1947)
1945	Western Illinois	1–5–1	0–3–1	T–3rd	
1946	Western Illinois	2–6	0–4	4th	
1947	Western Illinois	4–4–1	0–4	4th	
Western Illinois:		13–21–4	3–16–1		
Total:		13–21–4			
National championship Conference title Conference division title or championship game berth
