= 1928 Eastern Illinois Blue and Gray football team =

American college football season

1928 Eastern Illinois Blue and Gray football

IIAC champion
- Conference: Illinois Intercollegiate Athletic Conference
- Record: 7–0–1 (5–0–1 IIAC)
- Head coach: Charles Lantz (17th season)
- Home stadium: Schahrer Field

1928 Illinois Intercollegiate Athletic Conference football standings
	Conf.					Overall
Team	W		L		T	W		L		T
Eastern Illinois +	5	–	0	–	1	7	–	0	–	1
Millikin +	5	–	0	–	1	6	–	0	–	2
Augustana (IL)	6	–	1	–	0	7	–	1	–	0
Bradley	6	–	1	–	0	7	–	2	–	0
Monmouth (IL)	5	–	1	–	0	6	–	3	–	0
Southern Illinois	3	–	1	–	0	7	–	1	–	2
McKendree	2	–	1	–	0	5	–	5	–	0
Illinois Wesleyan	5	–	3	–	0	5	–	3	–	0
Carthage	2	–	2	–	1	2	–	3	–	2
Lake Forest	1	–	1	–	0	2	–	4	–	1
Illinois College	4	–	5	–	0	4	–	5	–	0
Eureka	3	–	4	–	1	3	–	4	–	1
North Central	2	–	3	–	1	4	–	3	–	2
Mount Morris	2	–	3	–	0	3	–	3	–	1
Western Illinois	2	–	3	–	2	2	–	3	–	3
St. Viator	1	–	3	–	0	3	–	5	–	0
Illinois State Normal	2	–	6	–	0	2	–	6	–	0
Knox (IL)	1	–	4	–	0	3	–	5	–	0
Wheaton (IL)	0	–	2	–	1	3	–	4	–	1
Northern Illinois State	0	–	2	–	1	0	–	6	–	1
Shurtleff	0	–	3	–	1	1	–	4	–	1
Lincoln (IL)	0	–	8	–	0	0	–	8	–	0
+ – Conference co-champions

The 1928 Eastern Illinois Blue and Gray football team represented Eastern Illinois State Teachers College (now known as Eastern Illinois University) as a member of the Illinois Intercollegiate Athletic Conference (IIAC) during the 1928 college football season. The team was led by seventeenth-year head coach Charles Lantz and played its home games at Schahrer Field. The Blue and Gray finished the season with a 7–0–1 record overall and a 5–0–1 record in conference play, making them conference co-champions with Millikin.

== Schedule ==
Date	Opponent	Site	Result	Source
October 6	Millikin	Schahrer Field; Charleston, IL	T 12–12	
October 13	Shurtleff	Schahrer Field; Charleston, IL	W 30–7	
October 20	Indiana State*	Schahrer Field; Charleston, IL	W 19–0	
October 27	at Rose Poly*	Terre Haute, IN	W 39–2	
November 3	at St. Viator	Bourbonnais, IL	W 26–0	
November 10	Illinois State Normal	Schahrer Field; Charleston, IL (rivalry)	W 19–0	
November 17	at Southern Illinois	Normal Field; Carbondale, IL	W 18–0	
November 23	Lincoln (IL)	Schahrer Field; Charleston, IL	W 75–0	
*Non-conference game
