= 1951 Western Illinois Leathernecks football team =

American college football season

1951 Western Illinois Leathernecks football
- Conference: Interstate Intercollegiate Athletic Conference
- Record: 7–1–1 (4–1–1 IIAC)
- Head coach: Vince DiFrancesca (3rd season)
- Home stadium: Hanson Field

1951 Interstate Intercollegiate Athletic Conference football standings
	Conf.					Overall
Team	W		L		T	W		L		T
Northern Illinois State	6	–	0	–	0	9	–	0	–	0
Western Illinois	4	–	1	–	1	7	–	1	–	1
Central Michigan	4	–	2	–	0	5	–	3	–	0
Eastern Illinois	2	–	2	–	2	4	–	2	–	2
Michigan State Normal	2	–	4	–	0	4	–	5	–	0
Illinois State Normal	1	–	4	–	1	3	–	5	–	1
Southern Illinois	0	–	6	–	0	0	–	9	–	0
$ – Conference champion

The 1951 Western Illinois Leathernecks football team was an American football team that represented Western Illinois University as a member of the Interstate Intercollegiate Athletic Conference (IIAC) during the 1951 college football season. Led by third-year head coach Vince DiFrancesca, the Leathernecks compiled an overall record of 7–1–1 with a mark of 4–1–1 in conference play, placing second in the IIAC.

== Schedule ==
Date	Opponent	Site	Result	Source
September 21	Hanover*	Hanson Field; Macomb, IL	W 25–0	
September 28	at Central Michigan	Alumni Field; Mount Pleasant, MI	W 27–6	
October 5	Michigan Tech*	Hanson Field; Macomb, IL	W 36–0	
October 12	Illinois State Normal	Hanson Field; Macomb, IL	W 28–7	
October 19	Southern Illinois	Hanson Field; Macomb, IL	W 54–12	
October 27	Michigan State Normal^{†}	Hanson Field; Macomb, IL	W 63–8	
November 3	Eastern Illinois	Hanson Field; Macomb, IL	T 21–21	
November 10	at Northern Illinois State	Glidden Field; DeKalb, IL	L 7–20	
November 16	at Carthage*	Carthage, IL	W 76–0	
*Non-conference game; ^{†}Homecoming
