= 1953 Southern Illinois Salukis football team =

American college football season

1953 Southern Illinois Salukis football
- Conference: Interstate Intercollegiate Athletic Conference
- Record: 2–7 (2–4 IIAC)
- Head coach: William O'Brien (2nd season)
- Home stadium: McAndrew Stadium

1953 Interstate Intercollegiate Athletic Conference football standings
	Conf.					Overall
Team	W		L		T	W		L		T
Central Michigan $	5	–	0	–	1	7	–	1	–	1
Western Illinois	5	–	1	–	0	8	–	2	–	0
Michigan State Normal	4	–	1	–	1	7	–	1	–	1
Illinois State Normal	3	–	3	–	0	5	–	4	–	0
Southern Illinois	2	–	4	–	0	2	–	7	–	0
Northern Illinois State	1	–	5	–	0	1	–	8	–	0
Eastern Illinois	0	–	6	–	0	1	–	8	–	0
$ – Conference champion

The 1953 Southern Illinois Salukis football team was an American football team that represented Southern Illinois University (now known as Southern Illinois University Carbondale) in the Interstate Intercollegiate Athletic Conference (IIAC) during the 1953 college football season. Under second-year head coach William O'Brien, the team compiled a 2–7 record. The team played its home games at McAndrew Stadium in Carbondale, Illinois.

== Schedule ==
Date	Time	Opponent	Site	Result	Attendance	Source
September 26		at Southeast Missouri State*	Houck Stadium; Cape Girardeau, MO	L 6–32	2,000	
October 3		at Illinois State Normal	McCormick Field; Normal, IL	L 20–27	3,000	
October 10		Northern Illinois State	McAndrew Stadium; Carbondale, IL	W 27–14	4,000	
October 17		Central Michigan	McAndrew Stadium; Carbondale, IL	L 6–19	2,500	
October 24		at Michigan State Normal	Briggs Field; Ypsilanti, MI	L 0–37		
October 31		Eastern Illinois	McAndrew Stadium; Carbondale, IL	W 6–0		
November 6		Missouri Mines*	McAndrew Stadium; Carbondale, IL	L 7–28		
November 14	2:00 p.m.	at Washington University*	Francis Field; St. Louis, MO	L 6–28	5,000	
November 19		at Western Illinois	Hanson Field; Macomb, IL	L 19–47		
*Non-conference game; All times are in Central time
