= 1951 Northern Illinois State Huskies football team =

American college football season

1951 Northern Illinois State Huskies football

IIAC champion
- Conference: Interstate Intercollegiate Athletic Conference
- Record: 9–0 (6–0 IIAC)
- Head coach: Chick Evans (23rd season)
- MVP: Bob Heimerdinger
- Captains: George Acker; Frank Bieber
- Home stadium: Glidden Field

1951 Interstate Intercollegiate Athletic Conference football standings
	Conf.					Overall
Team	W		L		T	W		L		T
Northern Illinois State	6	–	0	–	0	9	–	0	–	0
Western Illinois	4	–	1	–	1	7	–	1	–	1
Central Michigan	4	–	2	–	0	5	–	3	–	0
Eastern Illinois	2	–	2	–	2	4	–	2	–	2
Michigan State Normal	2	–	4	–	0	4	–	5	–	0
Illinois State Normal	1	–	4	–	1	3	–	5	–	1
Southern Illinois	0	–	6	–	0	0	–	9	–	0
$ – Conference champion

The 1951 Northern Illinois State Huskies football team represented Northern Illinois State Teachers College—now known as Northern Illinois University—as a member of the Interstate Intercollegiate Athletic Conference (IIAC) during the 1951 college football season. Led by 23rd-year head coach Chick Evans, the Huskies compiled an overall record of 9–0 with a mark of 6–0 in conference play, winning the IIAC title. The team played home games at the 5,500-seat Glidden Field, located on the east end of campus, in DeKalb, Illinois.

== Schedule ==
Date	Opponent	Site	Result	Source
September 22	at Whitewater State*	Hamilton Field; Whitewater, WI	W 20–7	
September 29	at Eastern Illinois	Lincoln Field; Charleston, IL	W 21–7	
October 6	at Southern Illinois	McAndrew Stadium; Carbondale, IL	W 14–7	
October 13	Michigan State Normal	Glidden Field; DeKalb, IL	W 35–21	
October 20	Illinois State Normal	Glidden Field; DeKalb, IL	W 39–13	
October 27	Peru State*	Glidden Field; DeKalb, IL	W 21–0	
November 2	at Central Michigan	Mount Pleasant, MI	W 26–13	
November 10	Western Illinois	Glidden Field; DeKalb, IL	W 20–7	
November 17	at Omaha*	Al F. Caniglia Field; Omaha, NE	W 27–26	
*Non-conference game
