= 1953 Northern Illinois State Huskies football team =

American college football season

1953 Northern Illinois State Huskies football
- Conference: Interstate Intercollegiate Athletic Conference
- Record: 1–8 (1–5 IIAC)
- Head coach: Chick Evans (25th season)
- MVP: Wes Luedeking
- Captain: Len Jacobson
- Home stadium: Glidden Field

1953 Interstate Intercollegiate Athletic Conference football standings
	Conf.					Overall
Team	W		L		T	W		L		T
Central Michigan $	5	–	0	–	1	7	–	1	–	1
Western Illinois	5	–	1	–	0	8	–	2	–	0
Michigan State Normal	4	–	1	–	1	7	–	1	–	1
Illinois State Normal	3	–	3	–	0	5	–	4	–	0
Southern Illinois	2	–	4	–	0	2	–	7	–	0
Northern Illinois State	1	–	5	–	0	1	–	8	–	0
Eastern Illinois	0	–	6	–	0	1	–	8	–	0
$ – Conference champion

The 1953 Northern Illinois State Huskies football team represented Northern Illinois State Teachers College—now known as Northern Illinois University—as a member of the Interstate Intercollegiate Athletic Conference (IIAC) during the 1953 college football season. Led by 25th-year head coach Chick Evans, the Huskies compiled an overall record of 1–8 with a mark of 1–5 in conference play, placing sixth in the IIAC. The team played home games at the 5,500-seat Glidden Field, located on the east end of campus, in DeKalb, Illinois.

== Schedule ==
Date	Opponent	Site	Result	Attendance	Source
September 16	at Lewis*	Joliet, IL	L 6–12		
October 3	at Beloit*	Beloit, WI	L 7–31		
October 10	at Southern Illinois	McAndrew Stadium; Carbondale, IL	L 14–27	4,000	
October 17	Michigan State Normal^{†}	Glidden Field; DeKalb, IL	L 14–20	8,000	
October 24	Illinois State Normal	Glidden Field; DeKalb, IL	L 0–39		
October 31	at Omaha*	Al F. Caniglia Field; Omaha, NE	L 14–47		
November 6	at Central Michigan	Alumni Field; Mount Pleasant, MI	L 0–46		
November 14	Western Illinois	Glidden Field; DeKalb, IL	L 0–27	3,500	
November 21	at Eastern Illinois	Lincoln Field; Charleston, IL	W 19–6		
*Non-conference game; ^{†}Homecoming
