= 1951 Southern Illinois Salukis football team =

American college football season

1951 Southern Illinois Salukis football
- Conference: Interstate Intercollegiate Athletic Conference
- Record: 0–9 (0–6 IIAC)
- Head coach: Bill Waller (2nd season)
- Home stadium: McAndrew Stadium

1951 Interstate Intercollegiate Athletic Conference football standings
	Conf.					Overall
Team	W		L		T	W		L		T
Northern Illinois State	6	–	0	–	0	9	–	0	–	0
Western Illinois	4	–	1	–	1	7	–	1	–	1
Central Michigan	4	–	2	–	0	5	–	3	–	0
Eastern Illinois	2	–	2	–	2	4	–	2	–	2
Michigan State Normal	2	–	4	–	0	4	–	5	–	0
Illinois State Normal	1	–	4	–	1	3	–	5	–	1
Southern Illinois	0	–	6	–	0	0	–	9	–	0
$ – Conference champion

The 1951 Southern Illinois Salukis football team was an American football team that represented Southern Illinois University (now known as Southern Illinois University Carbondale) in the Interstate Intercollegiate Athletic Conference (IIAC) during the 1951 college football season. Under second-year head coach Bill Waller, the team compiled a 0–9 record. The team played its home games at McAndrew Stadium in Carbondale, Illinois.

== Schedule ==
Date	Time	Opponent	Site	Result	Attendance	Source
September 22		Central Michigan	McAndrew Stadium; Carbondale, IL	L 13–34	2,000	
September 29	2:00 p.m.	at Illinois State Normal	McCormick Field; Normal, IL	L 0–20		
October 6		Northern Illinois State	McAndrew Stadium; Carbondale, IL	L 7–14		
October 13	2:00 p.m.	at Washington University*	Francis Field; St. Louis, MO	L 6–25	4,000	
October 19		at Western Illinois	Hanson Field; Macomb, IL	L 12–54		
October 27		Eastern Illinois	McAndrew Stadium; Carbondale, IL	L 19–47		
November 10		at Michigan State Normal	Briggs Field; Ypsilanti, MI	L 7–47		
November 17		at Southeast Missouri State*	Houck Stadium; Cape Girardeau, MO	L 6–45		
November 24		Arkansas State*	McAndrew Stadium; Carbondale, IL	L 0–68	1,000	
*Non-conference game; All times are in Central time
