= 1942 Northern Illinois State Huskies football team =

American college football season

1942 Northern Illinois State Huskies football
- Conference: Illinois Intercollegiate Athletic Conference
- Record: 3–2–2 (1–0–2 IIAC)
- Head coach: Chick Evans (14th season)
- Captain: John Farney
- Home stadium: Glidden Field

1942 Illinois Intercollegiate Athletic Conference football standings
	Conf.					Overall
Team	W		L		T	W		L		T
Western Illinois $	3	–	0	–	1	5	–	0	–	2
Northern Illinois State	1	–	0	–	2	3	–	2	–	2
Illinois State Normal	2	–	1	–	1	2	–	5	–	1
Southern Illinois	1	–	3	–	0	2	–	4	–	0
Eastern Illinois	0	–	3	–	0	1	–	6	–	0
$ – Conference champion

The 1942 Northern Illinois State Huskies football team represented Northern Illinois State Teachers College—now known as Northern Illinois University—as a member of the Illinois Intercollegiate Athletic Conference (IIAC) during the 1942 college football season. Led by 14th-year head coach Chick Evans, the Huskies compiled an overall record of 3–2–2 with a mark of 1–0–2 in conference play, placing second in the IIAC.

Northern Illinois was ranked at No. 344 (out of 590 college and military teams) in the final rankings under the Litkenhous Difference by Score System for 1942.

The team played home games at the 5,500-seat Glidden Field, located on the east end of campus, in DeKalb, Illinois.

== Schedule ==
Date	Opponent	Site	Result	Attendance	Source
September 26	Whitewater State*	Glidden Field; DeKalb, IL	W 13–0		
October 3	at Camp Grant*	Bell Bowl; Camp Grant, IL	L 0–43	10,000	
October 10	Western Illinois	Glidden Field; DeKalb, IL	T 14–14	2,500	
October 17	at Ball State*	Ball State Field; Muncie, IN (rivalry)	L 0–14		
October 24	at Stevens Point*	Stevens Point, WI	W 7–0		
October 31	Southern Illinois	Glidden Field; DeKalb, IL	W 34–7		
November 11	at Illinois State Normal	McCormick Field; Normal, IL	T 6–6	2,000	
November 14	Eastern Illinois	Glidden Field; DeKalb, IL	Canceled		
*Non-conference game
