= Joseph Young Bergen =

American botanist

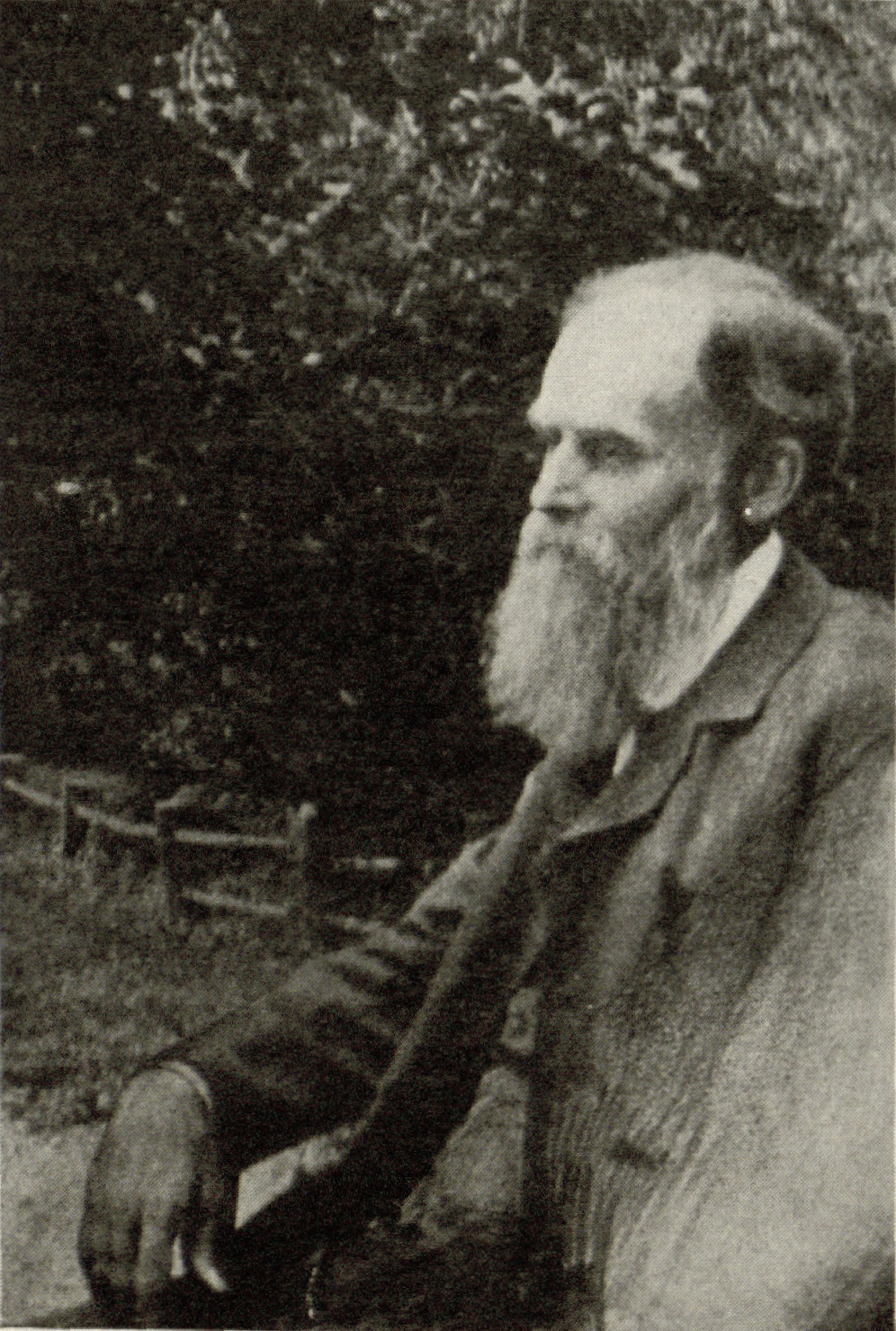
Joseph Young Bergen

Joseph Young Bergen (February 22, 1851 – October 10, 1917) was an American botanist.

== Career ==
Bergen was born in Red Beach, Maine. He graduated in 1872 from Antioch College, and was for a time successively a member of the Ohio Geological Survey and professor of natural sciences at Lombard College. In 1883, he became principal of the Peabody, Massachusetts high school and subsequently an instructor at the English High School of Boston (1889-1901). He was elected a Fellow of the American Academy of Arts and Sciences in 1915.

== Family ==
He married his fellow Antioch College graduate Fanny Dickerson on the 28 June 1876. They would write A Primer of Darwinism and Organic Evolution together, published in 1890. Fanny published numerous articles and books in her own right and was an acknowledge expert on American folklore.

== Publications ==
His publications include:

- Physics (with Prof E. H. Hall)
- A Primer of Darwinism and Organic Evolution (with F. D. Bergen, 1890)
- Elements of Botany (1896)
- Principles of Botany (with B. M. Davis, 1906)
- Practical Botany (with O. W. Caldwell, 1911)
- Introduction to Botany (with O. W. Caldwell, 1914)
