= 1951 Michigan State Normal Hurons football team =

American college football season

1951 Michigan State Normal Hurons football
- Conference: Interstate Intercollegiate Athletic Conference
- Record: 4–5 (2–4 IIAC)
- Head coach: Harry Ockerman (3rd season)
- Captain: Kenneth H. Wegner
- Home stadium: Briggs Field

1951 Interstate Intercollegiate Athletic Conference football standings
	Conf.					Overall
Team	W		L		T	W		L		T
Northern Illinois State	6	–	0	–	0	9	–	0	–	0
Western Illinois	4	–	1	–	1	7	–	1	–	1
Central Michigan	4	–	2	–	0	5	–	3	–	0
Eastern Illinois	2	–	2	–	2	4	–	2	–	2
Michigan State Normal	2	–	4	–	0	4	–	5	–	0
Illinois State Normal	1	–	4	–	1	3	–	5	–	1
Southern Illinois	0	–	6	–	0	0	–	9	–	0
$ – Conference champion

The 1951 Michigan State Normal Hurons football team represented Michigan State Normal College (later renamed Eastern Michigan University) in the Interstate Intercollegiate Athletic Conference (IIAC) during the 1951 college football season. In their third and final season under head coach Harry Ockerman, the Hurons compiled a 4–5 record (2–4 against IIAC opponents) and outscored their opponents, 186 to 183. Kenneth H. Wegner was the team captain. Vaskin Badalow, Nick Manych and Mike Orend were selected as first-team players on the All-IIAC team.

== Schedule ==
Date	Opponent	Site	Result	Attendance	Source
September 22	Hope*	Briggs Field; Ypsilanti, MI	W 20–7		
September 29	Kalamazoo*	Briggs Field; Ypsilanti, MI	W 20–6		
October 6	at Eastern Illinois	Lincoln Field; Charleston, IL	L 12–19		
October 13	at Northern Illinois State	Glidden Field; DeKalb, IL	L 21–35		
October 20	Central Michigan^{†}	Briggs Field; Ypsilanti, MI (rivalry)	L 13–19		
October 27	at Western Illinois	Hanson Field; Macomb, IL	L 28–63		
November 3	Illinois State Normal	Briggs Field; Ypsilanti, MI	W 12–0		
November 10	Southern Illinois	Briggs Field; Ypsilanti, MI	W 47–7		
November 17	at Wayne*	University of Detroit Stadium; Detroit, MI	L 13–27	2,347	
*Non-conference game; ^{†}Homecoming
