= 1953 Central Michigan Chippewas football team =

American college football season

1953 Central Michigan Chippewas football

IIAC champion
- Conference: Interstate Intercollegiate Athletic Conference
- Record: 7–1–1 (5–0–1 IIAC)
- Head coach: Kenneth Kelly (3rd season)
- MVP: Chuck Miller
- Home stadium: Alumni Field

1953 Interstate Intercollegiate Athletic Conference football standings
	Conf.					Overall
Team	W		L		T	W		L		T
Central Michigan $	5	–	0	–	1	7	–	1	–	1
Western Illinois	5	–	1	–	0	8	–	2	–	0
Michigan State Normal	4	–	1	–	1	7	–	1	–	1
Illinois State Normal	3	–	3	–	0	5	–	4	–	0
Southern Illinois	2	–	4	–	0	2	–	7	–	0
Northern Illinois State	1	–	5	–	0	1	–	8	–	0
Eastern Illinois	0	–	6	–	0	1	–	8	–	0
$ – Conference champion

The 1953 Central Michigan Chippewas football team represented Central Michigan College of Education, renamed Central Michigan University in 1959, in the Interstate Intercollegiate Athletic Conference (IIAC) during the 1953 college football season. In their third season under head coach Kenneth Kelly, the Chippewas compiled a 7–1–1 record (5–0–1 against IIAC opponents), won the IIAC championship, and outscored all opponents by a combined total of 244 to 129.

The team's statistical leaders included Lornie Kerr with 327 passing yards, Chuck Miller with 938 rushing yards, and Jim Podoley with 186 receiving yards. Miller received the team's most valuable player award and also received the IIAC most valuable player award. Four Central Michigan players (Miller, tackle Ken Barron, guard Jack Clary, and center Dick Kackmeister) received first-team honors on the All-IIAC team.

== Schedule ==
Date	Opponent	Site	Result	Attendance	Source
September 19	at Iowa State Teachers*	O. R. Latham Stadium; Cedar Falls, IA	W 34–20		
September 26	Western Michigan*	Alumni Field; Mount Pleasant, MI (rivalry)	W 21–0		
October 2	Eastern Illinois	Alumni Field; Mount Pleasant, MI	W 33–6		
October 10	vs. Great Lakes Naval*	Arthur Hill Stadium; Saginaw, MI	L 16–39	7,500	
October 17	at Southern Illinois	McAndrew Stadium; Carbondale, IL	W 19–6	2,500	
October 24	Western Illinois^{†}	Alumni Field; Mount Pleasant, MI	W 13–6		
October 31	at Illinois State Normal	McCormick Field; Normal, IL	W 29–19		
November 6	Northern Illinois	Alumni Field; Mount Pleasant, MI	W 46–0		
November 14	at Michigan State Normal	Briggs Field; Ypsilanti, MI (rivalry)	T 33–33		
*Non-conference game; ^{†}Homecoming
