= 1928 Northern Illinois State Teachers football team =

American college football season

1928 Northern Illinois State Teachers football
- Conference: Illinois Intercollegiate Athletic Conference
- Record: 0–6–1 (0–2–1 IIAC)
- Head coach: Roland Cowell (3rd season)
- Captain: Leslie Hedberg
- Home stadium: Glidden Field

1928 Illinois Intercollegiate Athletic Conference football standings
	Conf.					Overall
Team	W		L		T	W		L		T
Eastern Illinois +	5	–	0	–	1	7	–	0	–	1
Millikin +	5	–	0	–	1	6	–	0	–	2
Augustana (IL)	6	–	1	–	0	7	–	1	–	0
Bradley	6	–	1	–	0	7	–	2	–	0
Monmouth (IL)	5	–	1	–	0	6	–	3	–	0
Southern Illinois	3	–	1	–	0	7	–	1	–	2
McKendree	2	–	1	–	0	5	–	5	–	0
Illinois Wesleyan	5	–	3	–	0	5	–	3	–	0
Carthage	2	–	2	–	1	2	–	3	–	2
Lake Forest	1	–	1	–	0	2	–	4	–	1
Illinois College	4	–	5	–	0	4	–	5	–	0
Eureka	3	–	4	–	1	3	–	4	–	1
North Central	2	–	3	–	1	4	–	3	–	2
Mount Morris	2	–	3	–	0	3	–	3	–	1
Western Illinois	2	–	3	–	2	2	–	3	–	3
St. Viator	1	–	3	–	0	3	–	5	–	0
Illinois State Normal	2	–	6	–	0	2	–	6	–	0
Knox (IL)	1	–	4	–	0	3	–	5	–	0
Wheaton (IL)	0	–	2	–	1	3	–	4	–	1
Northern Illinois State	0	–	2	–	1	0	–	6	–	1
Shurtleff	0	–	3	–	1	1	–	4	–	1
Lincoln (IL)	0	–	8	–	0	0	–	8	–	0
+ – Conference co-champions

The 1928 Northern Illinois State Teachers football team represented Northern Illinois State Teachers College as a member of the Illinois Intercollegiate Athletic Conference during the 1928 college football season. Led by third-year head coach Roland Cowell, the Teachers compiled an overall record of 0–6–1 record with a mark of 0–2–1 record in conference play, tying for 19th place in the IIAC. Northern Illinois State played home games at Glidden Field, located on the east end of campus in DeKalb, Illinois. Leslie Hedberg was the team's captain.

== Schedule ==
Date	Opponent	Site	Result	Source
October 6	Illinois State Normal	Glidden Field; DeKalb, IL	L 0–10	
October 12	at Milwaukee Normal*	Milwaukee, WI	L 6–16	
October 20	Valparaiso*	Glidden Field; DeKalb, IL	L 6–12	
October 27	at Iowa State Teachers*	Cedar Falls, IA	L 0–39	
November 3	Michigan State Normal*	Glidden Field; DeKalb, IL	L 0–43	
November 10	at Mount Morris	Mount Morris, IL	L 0–19	
November 17	at Wheaton (IL)	Wheaton, IL	T 0–0	
*Non-conference game
