= 1953 Western Illinois Leathernecks football team =

American college football season

1953 Western Illinois Leathernecks football

Corn Bowl, W 32–0 vs. Iowa Wesleyan
- Conference: Interstate Intercollegiate Athletic Conference
- Record: 8–2 (5–1 IIAC)
- Head coach: Vince DiFrancesca (5th season)
- Home stadium: Hanson Field

1953 Interstate Intercollegiate Athletic Conference football standings
	Conf.					Overall
Team	W		L		T	W		L		T
Central Michigan $	5	–	0	–	1	7	–	1	–	1
Western Illinois	5	–	1	–	0	8	–	2	–	0
Michigan State Normal	4	–	1	–	1	7	–	1	–	1
Illinois State Normal	3	–	3	–	0	5	–	4	–	0
Southern Illinois	2	–	4	–	0	2	–	7	–	0
Northern Illinois State	1	–	5	–	0	1	–	8	–	0
Eastern Illinois	0	–	6	–	0	1	–	8	–	0
$ – Conference champion

The 1953 Western Illinois Leathernecks football team represented Western Illinois University as a member of the Interstate Intercollegiate Athletic Conference (IIAC) during the 1953 college football season. They were led by fifth-year head coach Vince DiFrancesca and played their home games at Hanson Field. The Leathernecks finished the season with a 8–2 record overall and a 5–1 record in conference play, placing second in the IIAC. They were invited to the postseason Corn Bowl, where they defeated Iowa Wesleyan 32–0.

== Schedule ==
Date	Opponent	Site	Result	Attendance	Source
September 19	at St. Ambrose*	Municipal Stadium; Davenport, IA	W 32–19		
September 25	Northeast Missouri State*	Hanson Field; Macomb, IL	W 19–13		
October 10	at Wheaton (IL)*	Wheaton, IL	L 13–14		
October 16	Illinois State Normal	Hanson Field; Macomb, IL	W 20–7		
October 24	at Central Michigan	Alumni Field; Mount Pleasant, MI	L 6–13		
October 31	Michigan State Normal	Hanson Field; Macomb, IL	W 20–0		
November 7	at Eastern Illinois	Lincoln Field; Charleston, IL	W 19–12		
November 14	at Northern Illinois State	Glidden Field; DeKalb, IL	W 27–0	3,500	
November 19	Southern Illinois	Hanson Field; Macomb, IL	W 47–19		
November 26	vs. Iowa Wesleyan*	Wesleyan Stadium; Bloomington, IL (Corn Bowl)	W 32–0	2,500	
*Non-conference game
