= 1942 Southern Illinois Maroons football team =

American college football season

1942 Southern Illinois Maroons football
- Conference: Illinois Intercollegiate Athletic Conference
- Record: 2–4 (1–3 IIAC)
- Head coach: Glenn Martin (4th season)
- Home stadium: McAndrew Stadium

1942 Illinois Intercollegiate Athletic Conference football standings
	Conf.					Overall
Team	W		L		T	W		L		T
Western Illinois $	3	–	0	–	1	5	–	0	–	2
Northern Illinois State	1	–	0	–	2	3	–	2	–	2
Illinois State Normal	2	–	1	–	1	2	–	5	–	1
Southern Illinois	1	–	3	–	0	2	–	4	–	0
Eastern Illinois	0	–	3	–	0	1	–	6	–	0
$ – Conference champion

The 1942 Southern Illinois Maroons football team was an American football team that represented Southern Illinois Normal University (now known as Southern Illinois University Carbondale) in the Illinois Intercollegiate Athletic Conference (IIAC) during the 1942 college football season. Under fourth-year head coach Glenn Martin, the team compiled a 2–4 record.

Southern Illinois was ranked at No. 505 (out of 590 college and military teams) in the final rankings under the Litkenhous Difference by Score System for 1942.

The team played its home games at McAndrew Stadium in Carbondale, Illinois.

== Schedule ==
Date	Opponent	Site	Result	Source
October 3	Cape Girardeau*	McAndrew Stadium; Carbondale, IL	L 7–26	
October 17	at Western Illinois	Morgan Field; Macomb, IL	L 0–26	
October 24	Illinois State Normal	McAndrew Stadium; Carbondale, IL	L 0–7	
October 31	at Northern Illinois State	Glidden Field; DeKalb, IL	L 0–34	
November 7	at Eastern Illinois	Schahrer Field; Charleston, IL	W 26–6	
November 14	Tennessee Junior*	McAndrew Stadium; Carbondale, IL	W 41–6	
*Non-conference game
