= 1953 Illinois State Normal Redbirds football team =

American college football season

1953 Illinois State Normal Redbirds football
- Conference: Interstate Intercollegiate Athletic Conference
- Record: 5–4 (3–3 IIAC)
- Head coach: Edwin Struck (9th season)
- MVP: Milt Kadlec
- Captains: Gene Hoffman; Jim Fox
- Home stadium: McCormick Field

1953 Interstate Intercollegiate Athletic Conference football standings
	Conf.					Overall
Team	W		L		T	W		L		T
Central Michigan $	5	–	0	–	1	7	–	1	–	1
Western Illinois	5	–	1	–	0	8	–	2	–	0
Michigan State Normal	4	–	1	–	1	7	–	1	–	1
Illinois State Normal	3	–	3	–	0	5	–	4	–	0
Southern Illinois	2	–	4	–	0	2	–	7	–	0
Northern Illinois State	1	–	5	–	0	1	–	8	–	0
Eastern Illinois	0	–	6	–	0	1	–	8	–	0
$ – Conference champion

The 1953 Illinois State Normal Redbirds football team represented Illinois State Normal University—now known as Illinois State University—as a member of the Interstate Intercollegiate Athletic Conference (IIAC) during the 1953 college football season. Led by ninth-year head coach Edwin Struck, the Redbirds compiled an overall record of 5–4 with a mark of 3–3 in conference play, placing fourth in the IIAC. Illinois State Normal played home games at McCormick Field in Normal, Illinois.

== Schedule ==
Date	Opponent	Site	Result	Attendance	Source
September 26	at Bradley*	Peoria Stadium; Peoria, IL	L 0–13		
October 3	Southern Illinois	McCormick Field; Normal, IL	W 27–20	3,000	
October 10	Beloit*	McCormick Field; Normal, IL	W 10–6		
October 16	at Western Illinois	Hanson Field; Macomb, IL	L 7–20		
October 24	at Northern Illinois State	Glidden Field; DeKalb, IL	W 39–0		
October 31	Central Michigan^{†}	McCormick Field; Normal, IL	L 19–29		
November 7	at Michigan State Normal	Briggs Field; Ypsilanti, MI	L 6–27		
November 14	Eastern Illinois	McCormick Field; Normal, IL (rivalry)	W 20–0		
November 21	Illinois Wesleyan*	McCormick Field; Normal, IL	W 13–6	4,000	
*Non-conference game; ^{†}Homecoming
