= Fanny D. Bergen =

American folklorist, ethnobiologist and author

- Born: Fanny Dickerson; 1846; Mansfield, Ohio
- Died: 1924 (aged 77–78); Boston
- Occupation: Folklorist
- Spouse: Joseph Young Bergen
- Children: 1

Fanny Dickerson Bergen (1846 – 1924) was an American folklorist, ethnobiologist and author.

== Biography ==
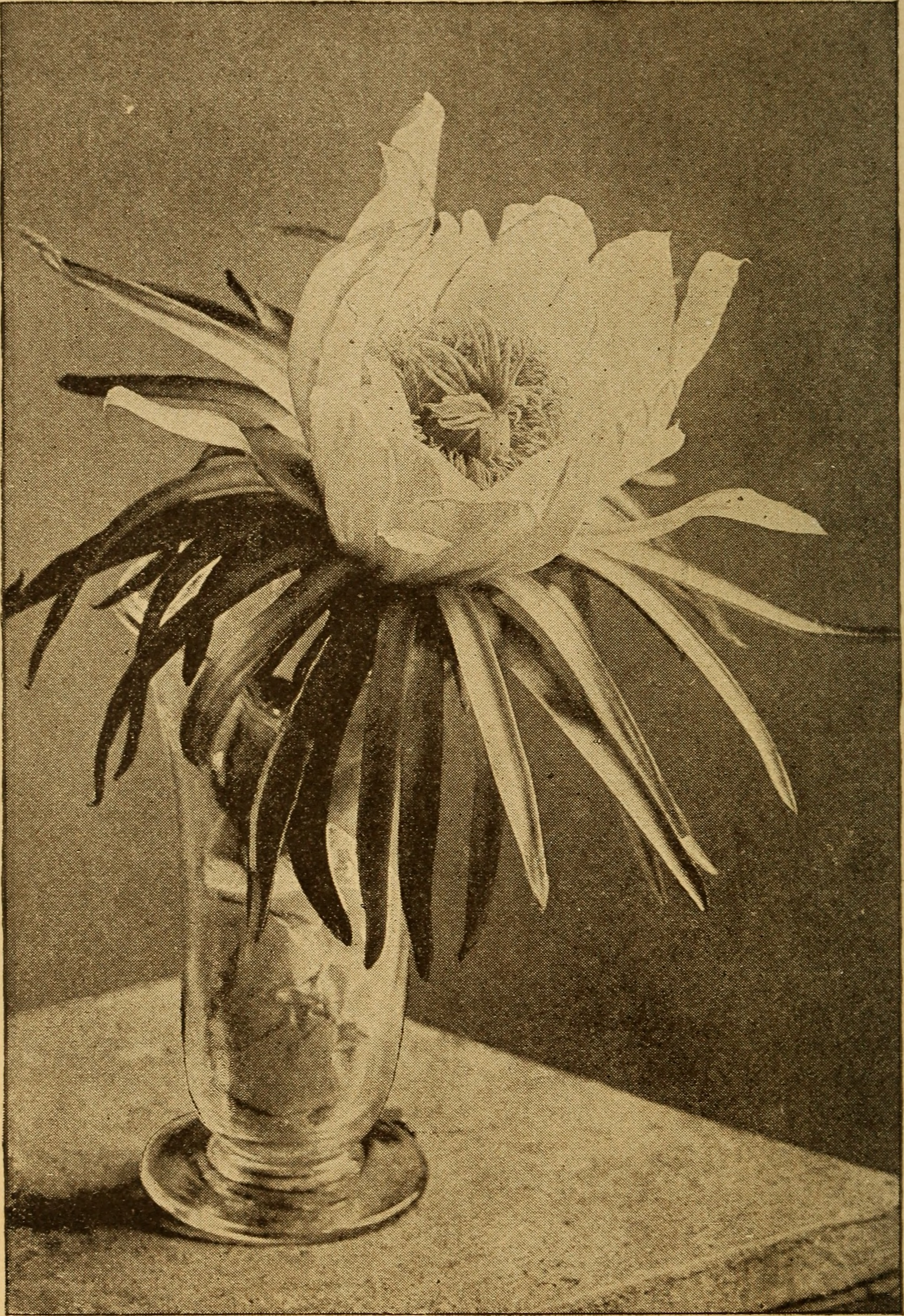
Glimpses at the Plant world illustration

Bergen was born Frances Dickerson in Mansfield, Ohio on 4 February 1846, to Thomas Dickerson and Rachel Gault of Richland County. Bergen worked as a teacher in old Woodville school then, Cleveland, Chicago and eventually at her alma mater Antioch College. Bergan attended Mansfield High school followed by Antioch College, Ohio graduating in 1875. During her time there her husband botanist Joseph Young Bergen had also attended, completing his master's while she was there. They married in 1876.

Bergen was a folklorist who worked on superstitions and customs. She had a specific interest in horticultural superstitions. As a result of her work documenting American immigrant animal and plant lore Bergen is regarded as being an early female pioneer of ethnobiology.

She worked with her husband on a number of botanical books. In 1879 Bergen became ill with a spinal disease which invalided her. She was also a contributor to Popular Science Monthly and Journal of American Folklore. She was considered an authority on folklore despite her inability to go into the field. Her grandmother told her stories from her life in Lake George, New York and talked about quilts. Very few patterns had been recorded when Bergen photographed and wrote about them in her article which was one of the earliest collection quiltmakers of names and designs in 1894.

Bergen lived in Cambridge, Massachusetts where they had a son Thomas Dickerson Bergen who was also a writer on Italian literature. He drowned in 1908. Bergen died in Boston in 1924.

== Bibliography ==
- Animal and plant lore; collected from the oral tradition of English speaking folk, (1899)
- Current superstitions: collected from the oral tradition of English speaking folk, (1896)
- The development theory, (1884)
- Glimpses at the plant world, (1894)
- A primer of Darwinism and organic evolution, (1890)
