= Elements of General Science =

1914 book by Caldwell & Eikenberry

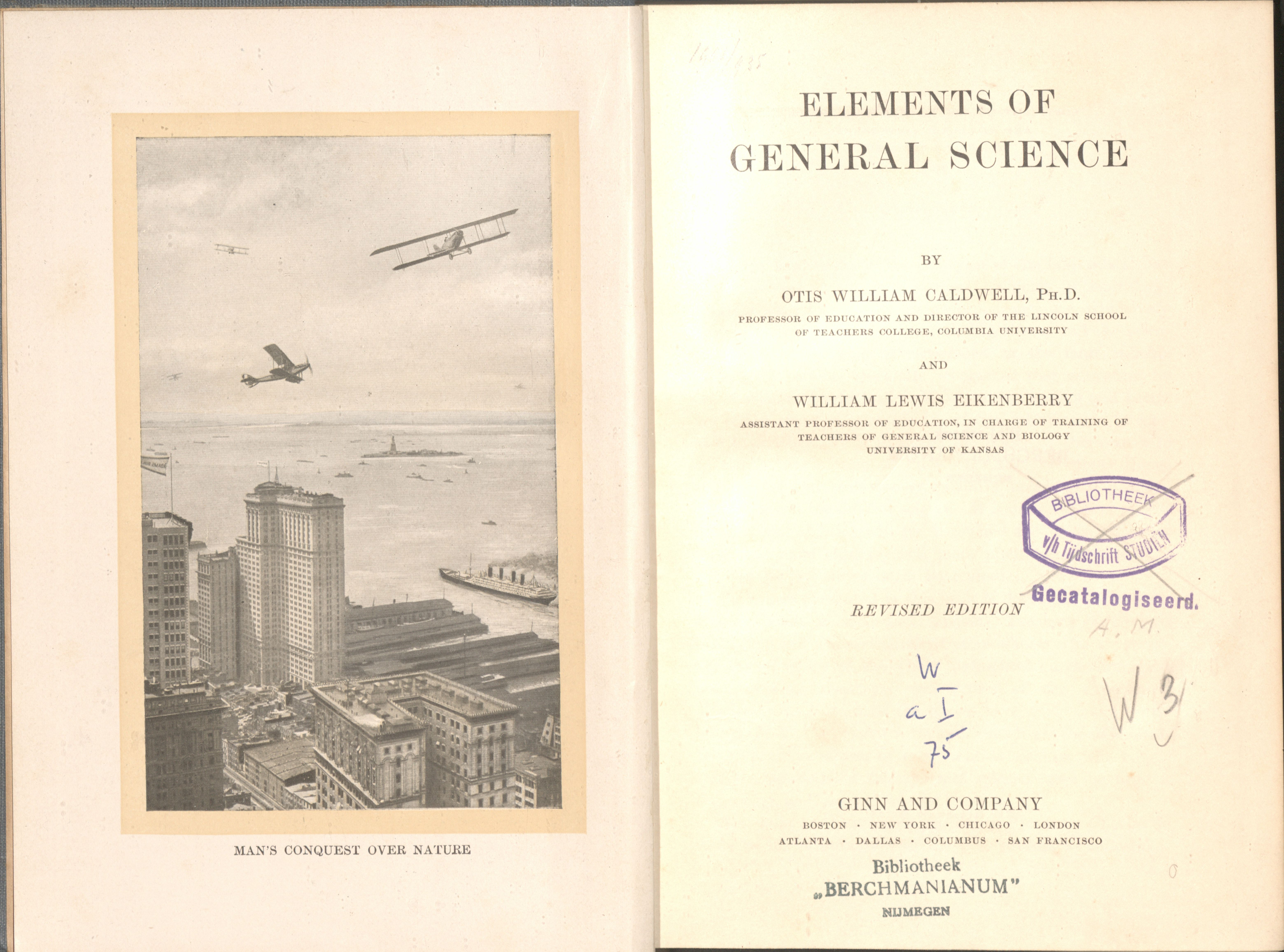
Title page of the 1918 version of the book "Elements of General Science"

Elements of General Science is a book written by Otis W. Caldwel and William L. Eikenberry that was first published by Ginn and Company in 1914. A revised version appeared in 1918. The book was designed to provide an introduction to the fundamental concepts of various scientific disciplines, aimed at high school students. It was the first general science textbook and contributed to the development of the general science movement in the United States in the early 20th century.

== Context ==
In 1893, the Committee of Ten of the National Education Association (NEA) in the United States called for the gap between the goals of secondary education and the academic standards of the university to be closed, citing the poor quality and lack of preparation for college at the secondary level. The new goal was to make education more practical and relevant to everyday life. This triggered a process of educational reorganisation in secondary education, leading to the emergence of the general science in the US. General science, in contrast to separate sciences such as biology, physics or chemistry, was an integrated or combined science that emerged as an introductory secondary school subject in the 20th century in the United States, United Kingdom and Japan. According to historians, the movement arose due to socio-economical changes, rise of progressive education movement, and the increasing number of secondary school students. Education in the US, UK and Japan called for democratisation, socialisation and practical application, with social efficiency being the priority for science teachers. General science was introduced by education authorities as a reform to adhere to this goals.

Otis W. Caldwell, botanist and a professor of education at the University of Chicago, responded to the need for more accessible science education in the US and to concerns about rising high school dropout rates and declining enrolment in science classes by proposing a unified high school science course called general science, and a unified introductory subject (for example elementary science, physical geography or physiography). This was the result of his field research at the beginning of the 20th century. Between 1908 and 1909, Caldwell visited up to 22 high schools in various locations, including Oak Park, Illinois; Columbus, Ohio; and several towns in Massachusetts and the eastern seaboard. He found that these courses were often too detailed, comprehensive, making them unsuitable for students not intending to pursue college education. Caldwell himself was an advocate of a more general approach to science education, with an emphasis on broad training and the experimental method. Caldwell intended to address the disparity between the educational standards recommended by the Committee of Ten and the actual conditions in many American schools. He also recognized that many teachers were not prepared to teach at the level required by these standards and that a significant number of schools lacked the necessary laboratory equipment to meet basic educational requirements. This led to the first adoptions of general science course in US's high schools. For example, In California, the general science course was introduced in 1906. In 1914, together with William Eikenberry, who was an instructor in botany at the Chicago's University High School, Otis Caldwell wrote the first general science textbook Elements of General Science. The laboratory manual was published in 1915 to accompany the book. This textbook, making up a course, was built upon years of experimentation in secondary school, specifically, Caldwell and Eikenberry's teaching of science at University High school in California, and contribution of many other science teachers. The objective of it was

...to develop a usable fund of knowledge about common things and helpful and trustworthy habits of considerig common experiences in the field of science. It is expected that pupils’ interests and abilities will be discovered and utilised in such ways that more effective and more profitable work may be done in the vocations or in later studies.

— O. Caldwell and W. Eikenberry

== Contents ==
The first edition of Elements of General Science contains five major topics, further divided in subdivisions, that compose a course intended for pupils of the first year of high school. These are:

- The Air: This section explores the composition and structure of air from various theoretical perspectives. It also covers air's role in food production, the distribution of dust, mold, and bacteria, and examines related concepts such as water, temperature, seasons, and weather.
- Water and Its Uses: This division discusses the properties and states of water (ice, liquid, and steam), the mechanical uses of water and air, the climatic effects of bodies of water, and issues related to water supply, sewage disposal, and commerce.
- Work and Energy: This section addresses common types of work, mechanical energy and heat, the production of heat and light from electrical currents, and the chemical and magnetic effects of electricity.
- The Earth's Crust: This part of the course examines the processes that transform rock into soil, the physical structure and fertility of soil, soil water management, drainage and irrigation, erosion, sedimentation, and the diversity of life within the soil.
- Life Upon the Earth: The final section covers the plant life that blankets the Earth, how plants utilize food, the nutritional processes in animals, the hygienic aspects of nutrition, reproduction in plants and animals, the struggle for existence, and the relationships between parents and offspring.

The topics are logically interconnected to ensure continuity. The book contains pictures, tables and illustrations of experiments that should be performed with the use of the laboratory manual. The experiments are suggested to be performed in the form of demonstrations, laboratory exercises, and home or school projects.

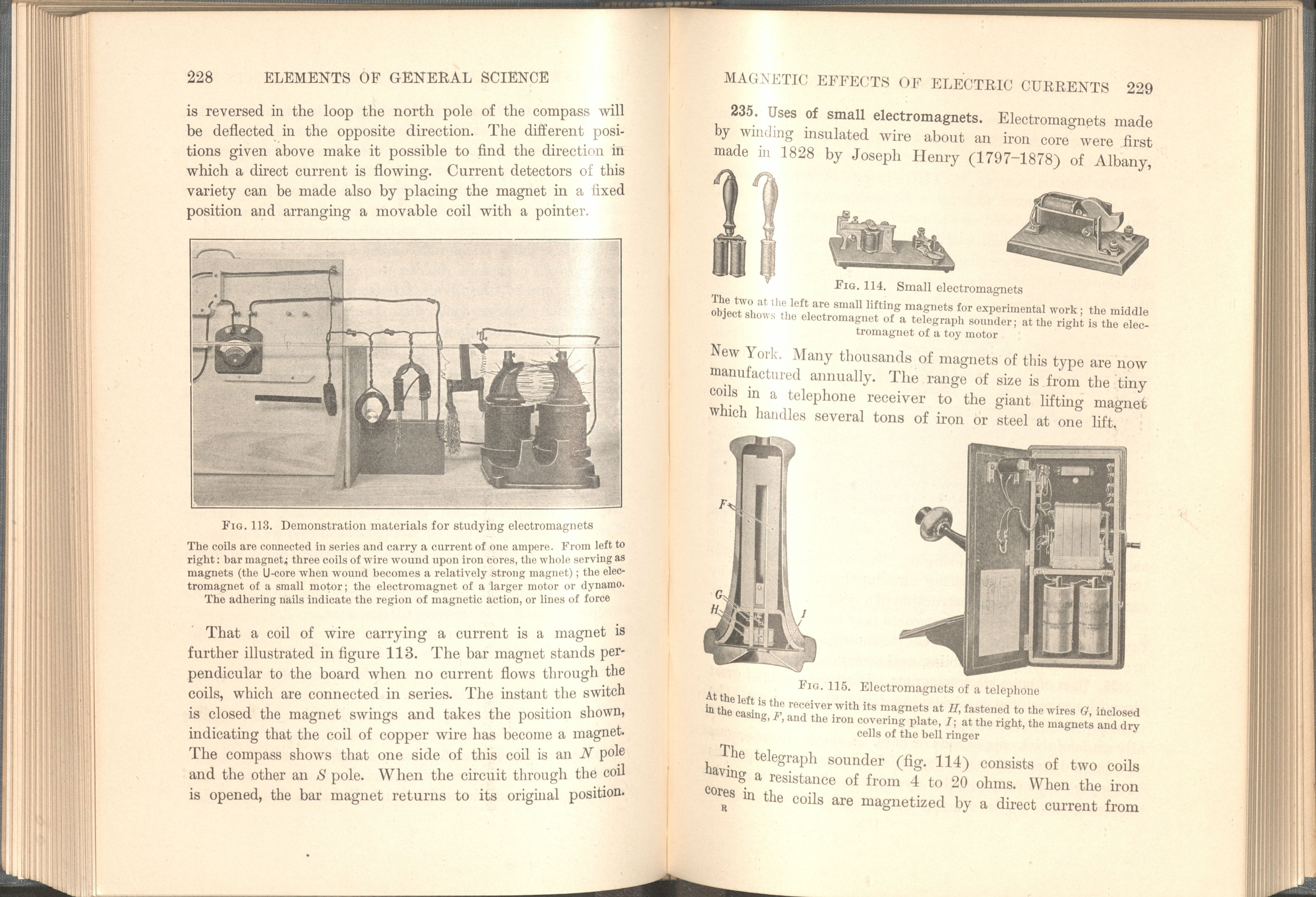
Part of the revised edition of the book. It illustrates the concepts in the chapter "The magnetic effects of electric currents".

The 1918 revised version of the book retained the organization and methodology of the original edition while incorporating updates based on scientific discoveries and educational experimentation. Certain topics were omitted from the revised edition. The Work and Energy major division was expanded to include electricity. An additional major section, The Earth in Relation to Other Astronomical Bodies, has been introduced. It discusses topics about the Moon, planets and comets, and the Sun and other stars. A list of Questions for Discussion was included at the beginning of each chapter, intended for teachers to read and discuss them briefly. These questions aimed to help students recall their previous experiences and establish new, relevant problems related to the book. According to the authors, they could serve as the best review of the material. The revised edition also includes fifty extra illustrations.

== Reception ==
=== Reviews ===
In the revised edition of The Elements of General Science, the authors claimed that the use of the course resulted in students feeling that they hadn't had any of the differentiated sciences (for example physics, chemistry or biology) and made them much more interested in studying these differentiated sciences in the future. The textbook was also taken positively by school teachers, mainly for the books effectiveness, simplicity and applicability in the everyday life, as stated by the reviews from 1915 and 1924. In 1920 and 1924 Caldwell, Eikenberry and Earl R. Glenn published a textbook Elements of General Science: Laboratory Problems, which was a new version of the 1915 laboratory manual A Laboratory Manual for General Science, which accompanied the general textbook. The new version of a laboratory manual appeared in 1924 and received immediate positive feedback for its practicality and engaging content.

The first edition of Elements of general science met criticism in 1995 by the professor of educational history and culture John M. Heffron for its emphasis on botany and practical applications at the expense of broader scientific principles. He noted that while the text provides detailed coverage of plant processes and their relevance to agriculture and human activities, it allocates limited space to physical sciences, with only 24 out of 302 pages devoted physical principles. He also pointed out that the book's treatment of these physical concepts is somewhat simplified, and focusing more on their practical implications rather than on the underlying scientific theories.

=== General science and future work ===
Being the first textbook on general science, Elements of General Science contributed to the development of general science movement in US. Following the publication of the textbook, Caldwell undertook field research to assess the extent to which the general science course was being used in various US states. For example, in 1914 and 1915, the graduate student of University of California, Aravilla Meek Taylor under the direction of Otis Caldwell, conducted investigations in the form of surveys in Iowa, were the course was introduced not long before the investigation, and California, where the course was introduced in 1906. In 1920, a few years after the publication of the Elements of General Science, the NEA Commission on the Reorganization of Secondary Schools recommended the introduction of a uniform general science course in the early grades of the secondary school. They called general science as "the science involved in normal human activities, and especially the science involved in the reconstruction period after the war", "the science of common use" and "the science of common sense". As stated in their report, it was not a substitute for any of the special sciences, but "a basis for discovery of interest in special sciences and of vocational opportunity". The same report suggested the books of Caldwell and Eikenberry, including Elements of General Science, as reading and reference books for the teaching of general science. The number of high schools teaching the general science course started to increase and the course became widely adopted in US high school curricula. By 1922, 18.3% of all high school students students in the country were enrolled in a general science course. Within 10 years of the publishing of the first version of the Caldwell and Eikenberry's book on general science, the number of various general science textbooks increased from 1 to 40. As a result of reformations and development of general science, by 1940s high schools adopted a dual tracking system, having two sets of courses with one directed at future college students and the other for non-college students, with the majority of students following the latter one. In the 1950s, after the death of Otis Caldwell, general science course was required in almost every high school and junior high school in the United States.

The general science course faced challenges such as the lack of clear definitions, despite Eikenberry's attempts to address this issue in 1922, and inadequate training in general science within teacher training programs. Not all educators could effectively grasp or teach the course, with many preferring to focus on specialized sciences or lacking the comprehensive understanding needed to teach general science. The professor of educational history and culture John M. Heffron's also criticised the general science course, developed and promoted by Caldwell and Eikenberry, for its approach to integrating science into general education, which he argued often diluted the rigour of scientific inquiry. He claimed that the course's emphasis on common sense and practical reasoning overshadowed the theoretical foundations of science, leading to a reduction in scientific education to problem-solving techniques applicable to everyday life. This, he suggested, compromised the integrity of science by blurring the line between science and non-science. Heffron noted that the course's broad sociological framing of science, while aimed at fulfilling educational and vocational goals, failed to foster a deep understanding of scientific principles, limiting its educational value.

Whether couched in broad sociological terms or in the language of common sense observation rejected by scientists over three centuries ago, the vision of science in general education articulated by Otis W. Caldwell and upheld in recent public discussions is fundamentally unscientific and, we might add, miseducative.

— J.M. Heffron,

Otis W. Caldwell and William L. Eikenberry continued to refine the general science course for several years following the publication of Elements of General Science. The laboratory manual accompanying Elements of General Science was subsequently updated in 1920 and 1924. In 1918, Caldwell became the chair of the National Education Association's Commission on the Reorganization of Secondary School Science, which played a significant role in establishing nationwide standards for science education. He became a key figure in the formation of various educational associations, where he conducted research on general science and the pedagogy of science education. He also published books about science and education, biology and superstitions. Eikenberry was also an active member of various educational associations and continued his career as a science teacher, publishing books and articles on general science and education.
