= 1928 Southern Illinois Maroons football team =

American college football season

1928 Southern Illinois Maroons football
- Conference: Illinois Intercollegiate Athletic Conference
- Record: 7–1–2 (3–1 IIAC)
- Head coach: William McAndrew (12th season)

1928 Illinois Intercollegiate Athletic Conference football standings
| | Conf. | | | | | Overall |
| Team | W | | L | | T | W | | L | | T |
|---|---|---|---|---|---|---|---|---|---|---|
| Eastern Illinois + | 5 | – | 0 | – | 1 | 7 | – | 0 | – | 1 |
| Millikin + | 5 | – | 0 | – | 1 | 6 | – | 0 | – | 2 |
| Augustana (IL) | 6 | – | 1 | – | 0 | 7 | – | 1 | – | 0 |
| Bradley | 6 | – | 1 | – | 0 | 7 | – | 2 | – | 0 |
| Monmouth (IL) | 5 | – | 1 | – | 0 | 6 | – | 3 | – | 0 |
| Southern Illinois | 3 | – | 1 | – | 0 | 7 | – | 1 | – | 2 |
| McKendree | 2 | – | 1 | – | 0 | 5 | – | 5 | – | 0 |
| Illinois Wesleyan | 5 | – | 3 | – | 0 | 5 | – | 3 | – | 0 |
| Carthage | 2 | – | 2 | – | 1 | 2 | – | 3 | – | 2 |
| Lake Forest | 1 | – | 1 | – | 0 | 2 | – | 4 | – | 1 |
| Illinois College | 4 | – | 5 | – | 0 | 4 | – | 5 | – | 0 |
| Eureka | 3 | – | 4 | – | 1 | 3 | – | 4 | – | 1 |
| North Central | 2 | – | 3 | – | 1 | 4 | – | 3 | – | 2 |
| Mount Morris | 2 | – | 3 | – | 0 | 3 | – | 3 | – | 1 |
| Western Illinois | 2 | – | 3 | – | 2 | 2 | – | 3 | – | 3 |
| St. Viator | 1 | – | 3 | – | 0 | 3 | – | 5 | – | 0 |
| Illinois State Normal | 2 | – | 6 | – | 0 | 2 | – | 6 | – | 0 |
| Knox (IL) | 1 | – | 4 | – | 0 | 3 | – | 5 | – | 0 |
| Wheaton (IL) | 0 | – | 2 | – | 1 | 3 | – | 4 | – | 1 |
| Northern Illinois State | 0 | – | 2 | – | 1 | 0 | – | 6 | – | 1 |
| Shurtleff | 0 | – | 3 | – | 1 | 1 | – | 4 | – | 1 |
| Lincoln (IL) | 0 | – | 8 | – | 0 | 0 | – | 8 | – | 0 |
+ – Conference co-champions

The 1928 Southern Illinois Maroons football team was an American football team that represented Southern Illinois Normal University (now known as Southern Illinois University Carbondale) in the Illinois Intercollegiate Athletic Conference (IIAC) during the 1928 college football season. In its 12th season under head coach William McAndrew, the team compiled a 7–1–2 record. The team played its home games at Normal Field in Carbondale, Illinois.

== Schedule ==
| Date | Time | Opponent | Site | Result | Source |
|---|---|---|---|---|---|
| September 28 | 2:30 p.m. | Murray State* | Normal Field; Carbondale, IL | T 0–0 | |
| October 5 | | Will Mayfield* | Normal Field; Carbondale, IL | W 39–0 | |
| October 12 | | at Tennessee Junior* | Martin, TN | W 32–0 | |
| October 20 | | Illinois Wesleyan | Normal Field; Carbondale, IL | W 12–0 | |
| October 26 | | at Cape Girardeau* | Cape Girardeau, MO | T 6–6 | |
| November 3 | | Scott Field* | Normal Field; Carbondale, IL | W 33–0 | |
| November 10 | | at Shurtleff | Lebanon, IL | W 12–7 | |
| November 17 | | Eastern Illinois | Normal Field; Carbondale, IL | L 0–18 | |
| November 24 | | Bethel (KY)* | Normal Field; Carbondale, IL | W 39–0 | |
| November 29 | | Illinois College | Normal Field; Carbondale, IL | W 7–0 | |
*Non-conference game; All times are in Central time
