= Edwin Struck =

American football coach

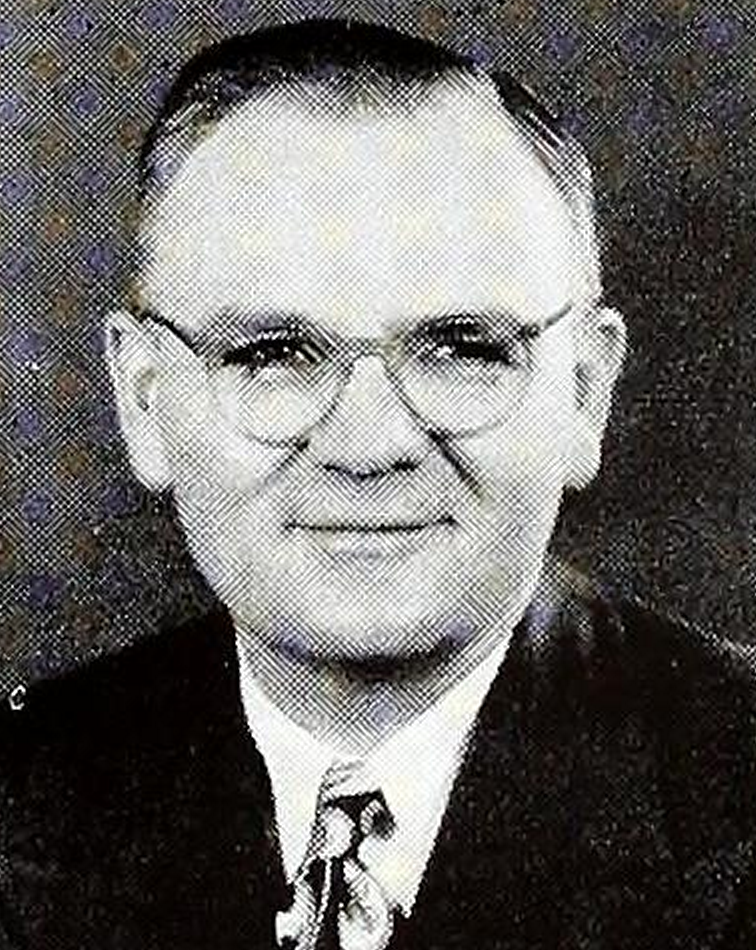
- Struck pictured in The Index 1952, Illinois State yearbook

Biographical details
- Born: March 27, 1905; Illinois, U.S.
- Died: September 24, 1981 (aged 76); Pinellas County, Florida, U.S.
- Education: DePauw University; Indiana University

Coaching career (HC unless noted)
- 1945–1964: Illinois State Normal / Illinois State

Head coaching record
- Overall: 86–78–14
- Tournaments: 0–1

Accomplishments and honors

Championships
- 2 IIAC (1945, 1950)

Edwin G. Struck (March 27, 1905 – September 24, 1981) was an American football coach. He was the 13th head football coach at Illinois State Normal University—now known as Illinois State University–in Normal, Illinois, serving for 20 seasons, from 1945 to 1964, and compiling a record of 86–78–14.

== Head coaching record ==
Year	Team	Overall	Conference	Standing	Bowl/playoffs
Illinois State Normal / Illinois State Redbirds (Illinois / Interstate Intercollegiate Athletic Conference) (1945–1964)
1945	Illinois State Normal	4–3	3–1	1st	
1946	Illinois State Normal	6–3	2–2	3rd	
1947	Illinois State Normal	4–3–2	1–1–2	T–3rd	
1948	Illinois State Normal	7–2	3–1	2nd	
1949	Illinois State Normal	6–2–1	1–2–1	T–3rd	
1950	Illinois State Normal	7–1–2	5–0–1	1st	L Corn
1951	Illinois State Normal	3–5–1	1–4–1	6th	
1952	Illinois State Normal	1–6–2	1–4–1	6th	
1953	Illinois State Normal	5–4	3–3	4th	
1954	Illinois State Normal	5–3–1	3–2–1	4th	
1955	Illinois State Normal	3–4–2	2–3–1	T–4th	
1956	Illinois State Normal	4–4–1	3–3	T–3rd	
1957	Illinois State Normal	5–3	3–3	T–4th	
1958	Illinois State Normal	3–6	2–4	T–5th	
1959	Illinois State Normal	3–5–1	0–5–1	7th	
1960	Illinois State Normal	2–6–1	1–4–1	5th	
1961	Illinois State Normal	5–4	4–2	T–2nd	
1962	Illinois State Normal	5–4	1–3	4th	
1963	Illinois State Normal	3–6	0–4	5th	
1964	Illinois State	5–4	2–2	3rd	
Illinois State Normal / Illinois State:		86–78–14	41–53–10		
Total:		86–78–14			
National championship Conference title Conference division title or championship game berth
