= 1951 Illinois State Normal Redbirds football team =

American college football season

1951 Illinois State Normal Redbirds football
- Conference: Interstate Intercollegiate Athletic Conference
- Record: 3–5–1 (1–4–1 IIAC)
- Head coach: Edwin Struck (7th season)
- MVP: Tony Liocci
- Captains: Al Buckwich; Howard Eades
- Home stadium: McCormick Field

1951 Interstate Intercollegiate Athletic Conference football standings
| | Conf. | | | | | Overall |
| Team | W | | L | | T | W | | L | | T |
|---|---|---|---|---|---|---|---|---|---|---|
| Northern Illinois State | 6 | – | 0 | – | 0 | 9 | – | 0 | – | 0 |
| Western Illinois | 4 | – | 1 | – | 1 | 7 | – | 1 | – | 1 |
| Central Michigan | 4 | – | 2 | – | 0 | 5 | – | 3 | – | 0 |
| Eastern Illinois | 2 | – | 2 | – | 2 | 4 | – | 2 | – | 2 |
| Michigan State Normal | 2 | – | 4 | – | 0 | 4 | – | 5 | – | 0 |
| Illinois State Normal | 1 | – | 4 | – | 1 | 3 | – | 5 | – | 1 |
| Southern Illinois | 0 | – | 6 | – | 0 | 0 | – | 9 | – | 0 |
$ – Conference champion

The 1951 Illinois State Normal Redbirds football team represented Illinois State Normal University—now known as Illinois State University—as a member of the Interstate Intercollegiate Athletic Conference (IIAC) during the 1951 college football season. Led by seventh-year head coach Edwin Struck, the Redbirds compiled an overall record of 3–5–1 with a mark of 1–4–1 in conference play, placing sixth in the IIAC. Illinois State Normal played home games at McCormick Field in Normal, Illinois.

== Schedule ==
| Date | Time | Opponent | Site | Result | Source |
|---|---|---|---|---|---|
| September 22 | 2:00 p.m. | Indiana State* | McCormick Field; Normal, IL | W 27–7 | |
| September 29 | | Southern Illinois | McCormick Field; Normal, IL | W 20–0 | |
| October 6 | 2:00 p.m. | Illinois Wesleyan* | McCormick Field; Normal, IL | L 6–13 | |
| October 12 | | at Western Illinois | Hanson Field; Macomb, IL | L 7–28 | |
| October 20 | | at Northern Illinois State | Glidden Field; DeKalb, IL | L 13–39 | |
| October 27 | | Central Michigan^{†} | McCormick Field; Normal, IL | L 0–26 | |
| November 3 | | at Michigan State Normal | Briggs Field; Ypsilanti, MI | L 0–12 | |
| November 10 | | Eastern Illinois | McCormick Field; Normal, IL (rivalry) | T 28–28 | |
| November 17 | | at Navy Pier* | St. Rita Stadium; Chicago, IL | W 26–12 | |
*Non-conference game; ^{†}Homecoming; All times are in Central time
