= 1953 Eastern Illinois Panthers football team =

American college football season

1953 Eastern Illinois Panthers football
- Conference: Interstate Intercollegiate Athletic Conference
- Record: 1–8 (0–6 IIAC)
- Head coach: Maynard O'Brien (7th season)
- Home stadium: Lincoln Field

1953 Interstate Intercollegiate Athletic Conference football standings
	Conf.					Overall
Team	W		L		T	W		L		T
Central Michigan $	5	–	0	–	1	7	–	1	–	1
Western Illinois	5	–	1	–	0	8	–	2	–	0
Michigan State Normal	4	–	1	–	1	7	–	1	–	1
Illinois State Normal	3	–	3	–	0	5	–	4	–	0
Southern Illinois	2	–	4	–	0	2	–	7	–	0
Northern Illinois State	1	–	5	–	0	1	–	8	–	0
Eastern Illinois	0	–	6	–	0	1	–	8	–	0
$ – Conference champion

The 1953 Eastern Illinois Panthers football team represented Eastern Illinois State College (now known as Eastern Illinois University) as a member of the Interstate Intercollegiate Athletic Conference (IIAC) during the 1953 college football season. The team was led by seventh-year head coach Maynard O'Brien and played their home games at Lincoln Field in Charleston, Illinois. The Panthers finished the season with a 1–8 record overall and an 0–6 record in conference play, finishing last in the IIAC.

== Schedule ==
Date	Opponent	Site	Result	Source
September 26	Lincoln (MO)*	Lincoln Field; Charleston, IL	L 0–30	
October 2	at Central Michigan	Alumni Field; Mount Pleasant, MI	L 6–33	
October 10	Michigan State Normal	Lincoln Field; Charleston, IL	L 6–34	
October 17	Northeast Missouri State*^{†}	Lincoln Field; Charleston, IL	L 2–7	
October 24	at Navy Pier*	Chicago, IL	W 20–6	
October 31	at Southern Illinois	McAndrew Stadium; Carbondale, IL	L 0–6	
November 7	Western Illinois	Lincoln Field; Charleston, IL	L 12–19	
November 14	at Illinois State Normal	McCormick Field; Normal, IL (rivalry)	L 0–20	
November 21	Northern Illinois State	Lincoln Field; Charleston, IL	L 6–19	
*Non-conference game; ^{†}Homecoming
