= 1945 Illinois State Normal Redbirds football team =

American college football season

1945 Illinois State Normal Redbirds football

IIAC champion
- Conference: Illinois Intercollegiate Athletic Conference
- Record: 4–3 (3–1 IIAC)
- Head coach: Edwin Struck (1st season)
- MVP: Melvin Kuethe
- Home stadium: McCormick Field

1945 Illinois Intercollegiate Athletic Conference football standings
	Conf.					Overall
Team	W		L		T	W		L		T
Illinois State Normal $	3	–	1	–	0	4	–	3	–	0
Southern Illinois	2	–	1	–	1	4	–	1	–	2
Northern Illinois State	2	–	2	–	0	4	–	3	–	0
Eastern Illinois	1	–	1	–	2	2	–	3	–	2
Western Illinois	0	–	3	–	1	1	–	5	–	1
$ – Conference champion

The 1945 Illinois State Normal Redbirds football team represented Illinois State Normal University—now known as Illinois State University—as a member of the Illinois Intercollegiate Athletic Conference (IIAC) during the 1945 college football season. Led by first-year head coach Edwin Struck, the Redbirds compiled an overall record of 4–3 with a mark of 3–1 in conference play, winning the IIAC title. Illinois State Normal played home games at McCormick Field in Normal, Illinois.

== Schedule ==
Date	Opponent	Site	Result	Source
September 29	at DePauw*	Greencastle, IN	L 0–32	
October 6	Indiana State*	McCormick Field; Normal, IL	W 13–6	
October 13	at Southern Illinois	McAndrew Stadium; Carbondale, IL	L 19–33	
October 20	at Western Illinois	Morgan Field; Macomb, IL	W 20–7	
October 27	Northern Illinois State^{†}	McCormick Field; Normal, IL	W 19–7	
November 10	Eastern Illinois	McCormick Field; Normal, IL (rivalry)	W 12–6	
November 17	Illinois Wesleyan*	McCormick Field; Normal, IL	L 6–24	
*Non-conference game; ^{†}Homecoming
