= 1951 Central Michigan Chippewas football team =

American college football season

1951 Central Michigan Chippewas football
- Conference: Interstate Intercollegiate Athletic Conference
- Record: 5–3 (4–2 IIAC)
- Head coach: Kenneth Kelly (1st season)
- Home stadium: Alumni Field

1951 Interstate Intercollegiate Athletic Conference football standings
	Conf.					Overall
Team	W		L		T	W		L		T
Northern Illinois State	6	–	0	–	0	9	–	0	–	0
Western Illinois	4	–	1	–	1	7	–	1	–	1
Central Michigan	4	–	2	–	0	5	–	3	–	0
Eastern Illinois	2	–	2	–	2	4	–	2	–	2
Michigan State Normal	2	–	4	–	0	4	–	5	–	0
Illinois State Normal	1	–	4	–	1	3	–	5	–	1
Southern Illinois	0	–	6	–	0	0	–	9	–	0
$ – Conference champion

The 1951 Central Michigan Chippewas football team represented Central Michigan College of Education, renamed Central Michigan University in 1959, in the Interstate Intercollegiate Athletic Conference (IIAC) during the 1951 college football season. In their first season under head coach Kenneth Kelly, the Chippewas compiled a 5–3 record (4–2 against IIAC opponents) and outscored all opponents by a total of 231 to 158.

Six Central Michigan players (quarterback Andy McDonald, halfback Dave Clark, guard Loren Dietrich, halfback Dick Flewelling, tackle Jim Schultz, and guard Tom Weede) received first-team honors on the All-IIAC team.

Coach Kelly was hired by Central Michigan in March 1951. A native of Mt. Pleasant, Michigan, Kelly was a Central Michigan alumnus who had won a school record 13 varsity letters in football, basketball, tennis, and baseball. He had been the athletic director and head football and basketball coach at Saginaw Arthur Hill High School for nine years.

== Schedule ==
Date	Opponent	Site	Result	Attendance	Source
September 22	at Southern Illinois	McAndrew Stadium; Carbondale, IL	W 34–12	2,000	
September 28	Western Illinois	Alumni Field; Mount Pleasant, MI	L 6–27		
October 13	Eastern Illinois^{†}	Alumni Field; Mount Pleasant, MI	W 59–27		
October 20	at Michigan State Normal	Briggs Field; Ypsilanti, MI (rivalry)	W 19–13		
October 27	at Illinois State Normal	McCormick Field; Normal, IL	W 26–0		
October 2	Northern Illinois	Alumni Field; Mount Pleasant, MI	L 13–26		
November 9	at Ferris Institute*	Big Rapids, MI	W 49–6		
November 17	Western Michigan*	Alumni Field; Mount Pleasant, MI (rivalry)	L 25–46		
*Non-conference game; ^{†}Homecoming

== Statistics ==
Quarterback Andy MacDonald led the team in passing. He completed 114 of 183 passes for 1,560 yards, 12 touchdowns, and seven interceptions.

The team's leading rushers were Dave Clark (301 yards on 50 carries, 6.02 yards per carry), Chuck Miller (293 yards on 49 carries, 5.98 yards per carry), and Verne Hawes (204 carries on 32 carries, 6.38 yards per carry).

The leading receivers were Chuck Miller (23 receptions for 322 yared), Porter Lewis (25 receptions for 286 yards), and Tom Mason (15 receptions for 227 yards).

The leading scorers were Chuck Miller (42 points) and Dave Clark (30 points).

Don Partenio handled most of the punting, averaging 34.2 yards on 14 punts.
