= 1945 Eastern Illinois Panthers football team =

American college football season

1945 Eastern Illinois Panthers football
- Conference: Illinois Intercollegiate Athletic Conference
- Record: 2–3–2 (1–1–2 IIAC)
- Head coach: James Goff (1st season)
- Home stadium: Schahrer Field

1945 Illinois Intercollegiate Athletic Conference football standings
| | Conf. | | | | | Overall |
| Team | W | | L | | T | W | | L | | T |
|---|---|---|---|---|---|---|---|---|---|---|
| Illinois State Normal $ | 3 | – | 1 | – | 0 | 4 | – | 3 | – | 0 |
| Southern Illinois | 2 | – | 1 | – | 1 | 4 | – | 1 | – | 2 |
| Northern Illinois State | 2 | – | 2 | – | 0 | 4 | – | 3 | – | 0 |
| Eastern Illinois | 1 | – | 1 | – | 2 | 2 | – | 3 | – | 2 |
| Western Illinois | 0 | – | 3 | – | 1 | 1 | – | 5 | – | 1 |
$ – Conference champion

The 1945 Eastern Illinois Panthers football team represented Eastern Illinois University as a member of the Illinois Intercollegiate Athletic Conference (IIAC) during the 1945 college football season. The team was led by first-year head coach James Goff and played their home games at Schahrer Field in Charleston, Illinois. The Panthers finished the season with a 2–3–2 record overall and a 1–1–2 record in conference play.

== Schedule ==
| Date | Opponent | Site | Result | Source |
|---|---|---|---|---|
| September 22 | Indiana State* | Schahrer Field; Charleston, IL | L 6–26 | |
| September 29 | at Butler* | Indianapolis, IN | W 12–7 | |
| October 13 | at Illinois Wesleyan* | Memorial Stadium; Bloomington, IL | L 0–20 | |
| October 20 | Southern Illinois | Schahrer Field; Charleston, IL | T 0–0 | |
| November 3 | at Western Illinois | Morgan Field; Macomb, IL | T 6–6 | |
| November 10 | at Illinois State Normal | McCormick Field; Normal, IL (rivalry) | L 6–12 | |
| November 17 | Northern Illinois State | Schahrer Field; Charleston, IL | W 19–14 | |
*Non-conference game
