= 1942 Western Illinois Leathernecks football team =

American college football season

1942 Western Illinois Leathernecks football

IIAC champion
- Conference: Illinois Intercollegiate Athletic Conference
- Record: 5–0–2 (3–0–1 IIAC)
- Head coach: Wix Garner (1st season)
- Home stadium: Morgan Field

1942 Illinois Intercollegiate Athletic Conference football standings
	Conf.					Overall
Team	W		L		T	W		L		T
Western Illinois $	3	–	0	–	1	5	–	0	–	2
Northern Illinois State	1	–	0	–	2	3	–	2	–	2
Illinois State Normal	2	–	1	–	1	2	–	5	–	1
Southern Illinois	1	–	3	–	0	2	–	4	–	0
Eastern Illinois	0	–	3	–	0	1	–	6	–	0
$ – Conference champion

The 1942 Western Illinois Leathernecks football team represented Western Illinois University as a member of the Illinois Intercollegiate Athletic Conference (IIAC) during the 1942 college football season. They were led by first-year head coach Wix Garner and played their home games at Morgan Field. The Leathernecks finished the season with a 5–0–2 record overall and a 3–0–1 record in conference play, winning the IIAC title.

Western Illinois was ranked at No. 357 (out of 590 college and military teams) in the final rankings under the Litkenhous Difference by Score System for 1942.

== Schedule ==
Date	Opponent	Site	Result	Attendance	Source
September 26	at Illinois College*	Jacksonville, IL	T 0–0		
October 3	Iowa Wesleyan*	Morgan Field; Macomb, IL	W 13–0		
October 10	at Northern Illinois State	Glidden Field; DeKalb, IL	T 14–14	2,500	
October 17	Southern Illinois	Morgan Field; Macomb, IL	W 26–0		
October 24	at Eastern Illinois	Charleston, IL	W 45–0		
October 31	Illinois State Normal	Morgan Field; Macomb, IL	W 12–7		
November 7	at Carthage*	Carthage, IL	W 14–7		
*Non-conference game
