= Clayton Miller (academic) =

Building data scientist

- Education: ETH Zurich (Dr. sc. ETH); National University of Singapore (MSc); University of Nebraska–Lincoln (BSAE, MAE)
- Known for: Building Data Genome Project; occupant-centric building control (IEA EBC Annex 79); Cozie smartwatch comfort platform
- Scientific career
- Fields: Urban informatics; building performance; data science
- Workplaces: Singapore Management University; National University of Singapore; ETH Zurich
- Thesis: Screening Meter Data: Characterization of Temporal Energy Data from Large Groups of Non-Residential Buildings (2016)

Clayton Miller is a building data scientist and urban informatics researcher. He is an associate professor of Urban Informatics at the College of Integrative Studies, Singapore Management University (SMU). Miller leads the Building and Urban Data Science (BUDS) Lab, which in September 2025 moved to SMU after operating at the National University of Singapore (NUS) from 2017 to 2025. He is known for open building-energy datasets, including the Building Data Genome Project, and for work on occupant-centric building design and operation.

== Education ==
Miller earned a B.S. in Architectural Engineering (2006) and an M.A.E. (2007) from the University of Nebraska–Lincoln. He completed an M.Sc. (Building) at the National University of Singapore in 2011, and a Doctor of Sciences (Dr. sc. ETH) at ETH Zurich in 2016 with the thesis Screening Meter Data: Characterization of Temporal Energy Data from Large Groups of Non-Residential Buildings.

== Career ==
From 2017 to 2025 Miller was on the faculty of the Department of the Built Environment at the National University of Singapore, where he established and led the Building and Urban Data Science (BUDS) Lab. In 2025 he joined the College of Integrative Studies at SMU as associate professor of Urban Informatics, where his group focuses on human experiences in indoor and outdoor environments and continues the BUDS Lab activities.

Miller has served as a co-leader of Subtask 4 (development and demonstration of occupant-centric building controls) of the International Energy Agency’s Energy in Buildings and Communities Programme (IEA EBC) Annex 79. He has also collaborated with the Berkeley Education Alliance for Research in Singapore (SinBerBEST/BEARS) on data-analytics themes for the built environment.

Miller’s research covers data analytics for buildings and cities, including methods to identify patterns in large energy-meter datasets and approaches for occupant-centric building operation. He was lead author of the Building Data Genome datasets, widely used for benchmarking and machine-learning studies in building energy prediction. He co-led international efforts on occupant-centric building controls within IEA EBC Annex 79, synthesizing real-world implementations and guidance for practice.

Miller’s group also develops the open-source Cozie smartwatch platform to gather right-here-right-now feedback on environmental comfort and related physiological data for indoor and urban studies.

== Teaching and outreach ==
In 2020 Miller created the online course Data Science for Construction, Architecture and Engineering, initially offered on edX and later made available on YouTube.

== Selected works ==
- Miller, C.; Nagy, Z.; Schlueter, A. (2015). “Automated daily pattern filtering of measured building performance data.” Automation in Construction, 49, 1–17.
- Miller, C.; Meggers, F. (2017). “The Building Data Genome Project: An open, public data set from non-residential building electrical meters.” eScholarship, University of California.
- Miller, C. et al. (2020). “The Building Data Genome Project 2, energy meter data from the ASHRAE Great Energy Predictor III competition.” Scientific Data 7:368.
- Tartarini, F.; Parkinson, T.; Miller, C. (2022). “Cozie Apple: An iOS mobile and smartwatch application for environmental quality, satisfaction and physiological data collection.” arXiv 2210.13977.
