= Thornton Smallwood =

American football coach

Thomton Smallwood
Coaching career (HC unless noted)
- 1902: Eastern Illinois

Head coaching record
- Overall: 2–4

Thomton Smallwood was an American football coach. He was the second head football coach at Eastern Illinois State Normal School—now known as Eastern Illinois University—in Charleston, Illinois, serving for one season, in 1902, and compiling a record of 2–4.

== Head coaching record ==
Year	Team	Overall	Conference	Standing	Bowl/playoffs
Eastern Illinois Blue and Gray (Independent) (1902)
1902	Eastern Illinois	2–4			
Eastern Illinois:		2–4			
Total:		2–4			
