= Maynard O'Brien =

American football coach (1907–1990)

Biographical details
- Born: January 12, 1907
- Died: March 16, 1990 (aged 83); Charleston, Illinois, U.S.
- Education: Illinois Wesleyan University; University of Illinois at Urbana–Champaign

Coaching career (HC unless noted)
- 1946–1950: Eastern Illinois
- 1952–1955: Eastern Illinois

Head coaching record
- Overall: 27–50–1
- Bowls: 0–1

Accomplishments and honors

Championships
- 1 IIAC (1948)

Maynard "Pat" O'Brien (January 12, 1907 – March 16, 1990) was an American college football coach. He was the 13th head football coach at Eastern Illinois State College—now known as Eastern Illinois University—in Charleston, Illinois, serving for nine seasons, from 1946 to 1950 and 1952 to 1955, and compiling a record of 27–50–1.

O'Brien Field was named in Maynard O'Brien's honor.

== Head coaching record ==
Year	Team	Overall	Conference	Standing	Bowl/playoffs
Eastern Illinois Panthers (Illinois / Interstate Intercollegiate Athletic Conference) (1946–1950)
1946	Eastern Illinois	2–6	1–3	4th	
1947	Eastern Illinois	2–6	2–2	T–3rd	
1948	Eastern Illinois	7–3	4–0	1st	L Corn
1949	Eastern Illinois	3–5	2–2	3rd	
1950	Eastern Illinois	5–3	2–2	T–3rd	
Eastern Illinois Panthers (Interstate Intercollegiate Athletic Conference) (1952–1955)
1952	Eastern Illinois	2–7	1–5	7th	
1953	Eastern Illinois	1–8	0–6	7th	
1954	Eastern Illinois	2–6–1	1–4–1	5th	
1955	Eastern Illinois	3–6	1–5	6th	
Eastern Illinois:		27–50–1	14–29–1		
Total:		27–50–1			
National championship Conference title Conference division title or championship game berth

== See also ==
- List of college football head coaches with non-consecutive tenure
