= Westville High School (Illinois) =

Location
- 918 N State St; Westville, Illinois 61883, Illinois; United States; 40.052002°N 87.64094°W

Information
- Type: Public
- Superintendent: Seth Miller
- Principal: Michelle Schaumburg
- Staff: 22.00 (FTE)
- Grades: 9-12
- Enrollment: 350 (2022–23)
- Student to teacher ratio: 15.91
- Colors: Orange; Black
- Athletics conference: Vermilion Valley (VVC)
- Mascot: Tiger
- Website: Westville High School website

Westville High School is a high school located in Westville, Vermilion County, Illinois, United States. WHS is a member of the Westville Community School District #2, which also includes one grade schools, Judith Giacoma Elementary (Grades K-6) and one junior high, Westville Junior High School (Grades 7–8). Westville High School, also offers many athletic activities including Boys' And Girls' Basketball, Boys' Football, Softball, Baseball, Wrestling, Esports, fishing and other activities, like band and chorus
