= Otis Caldwell =

American botanist, college football coach and science writer

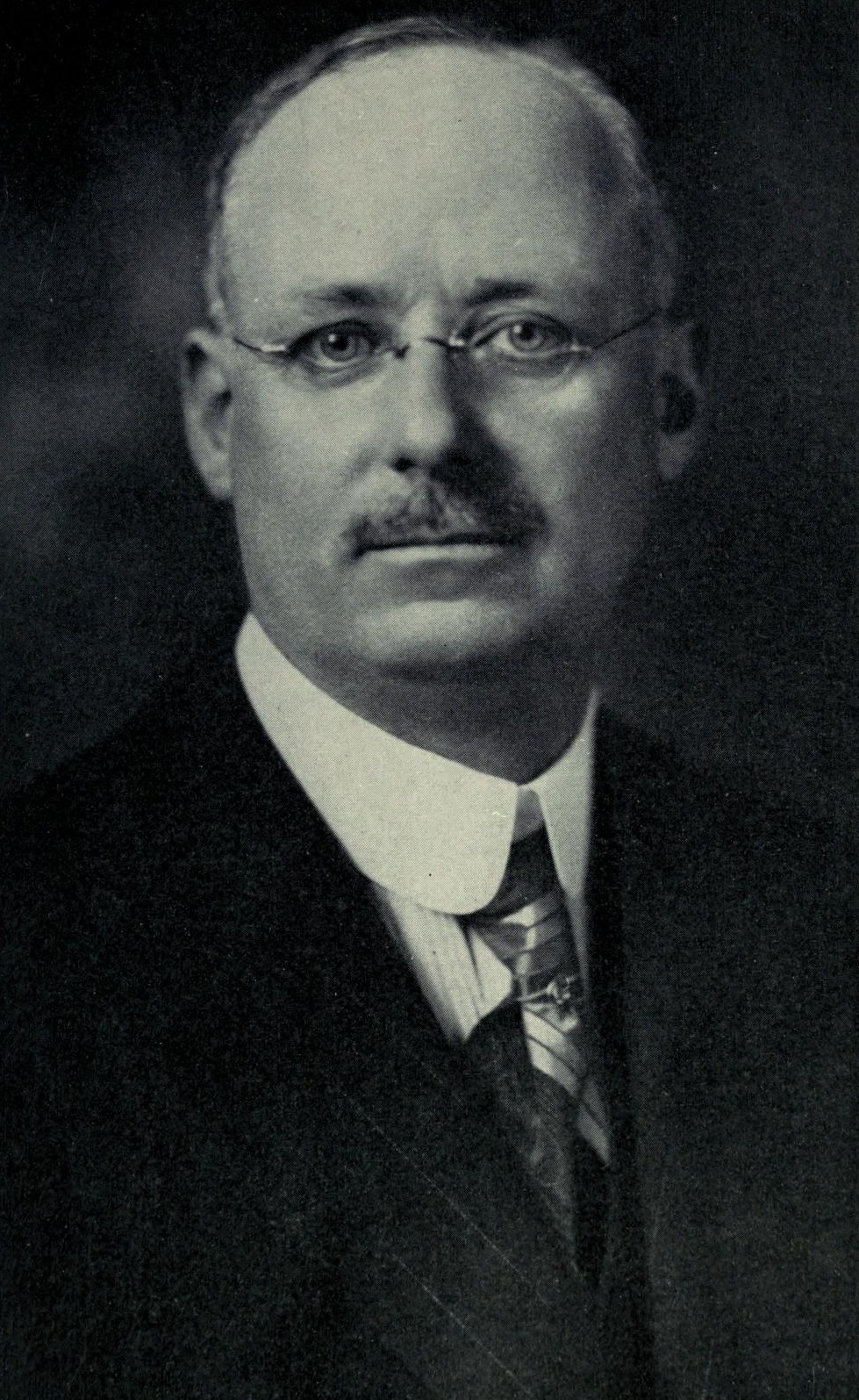

Biographical details
- Born: December 18, 1869; Lebanon, Indiana, U.S.
- Died: July 5, 1947

Coaching career (HC unless noted)
- 1899–1901: Eastern Illinois

Head coaching record
- Overall: 9–5–3

Otis William Caldwell (December 18, 1869 – July 5, 1947) was an American botanist, college football coach and science writer.

== Biography ==
Caldwell was born in Lebanon, Indiana. He was educated at Franklin (Ind.) College and obtained his B.S. degree in 1894. He studied botany and obtained his Ph.D. from the University of Chicago in 1898.

He was professor of botany at the Eastern Illinois State Normal School from 1899 to 1907. In 1907 he was named associate professor of botany at the University of Chicago. While at Eastern Illinois, Caldwell served as head coach of the school's football team for three seasons, from 1899 to 1901. He served on the board of trustees for Science Service, now known as Society for Science & the Public, from 1944 to 1947.

Caldwell was Chairman of the Committee on Science of the Commission on The Reorganization of Secondary Education. He was director of the Lincoln School at Teachers College, Columbia University. He worked as the General Secretary of the American Association for the Advancement of Science and organized the AAAS Committee on the Place of Science in Education. He was the founder of the American Science Teachers Association.

Caldwell was a skeptic. He did research on superstitious and unfounded beliefs. In 1934, he authored Do You Believe It?, an early text on anomalistic psychology.

== Head coaching record ==
Year	Team	Overall	Conference	Standing	Bowl/playoffs
Eastern Illinois Blue and Gray (Independent) (1899)
1899	Eastern Illinois	0–2			
1900	Eastern Illinois	3–3			
1901	Eastern Illinois	6–0–3			
Eastern Illinois:		9–5–3			
Total:		9–5–3			

== Selected publications ==
- A Laboratory Manual of Botany (1901; revised edition, 1902).
- Plant Morphology (1903; revised edition, 1904).
- The High School Course in Botany (1909).
- Practical Botany (1911, with J. Y. Bergen).
- A Laboratory Manual for Work in General Science (1915).
- Elements of General Science (1918, with William Lewis Eikenberry).
- Biology in the Public Press (1923, with Charles William Finley).
- Science Remaking the World (1923, with Edwin Emery Slosson).
- Then and Now in Education, 1845–1923 (1924, with Stuart A. Courtis).
- Open Doors to Science: With Experiments (1926, with William Herman Dietrich Meier).
- Do You Believe It? (1934, with Gerhard Emmanuel Lundeen.)
- Everyday Biology (1940, with Francis Curtis and Nina Sherman.)
