= Joseph Brown (coach) =

American football and basketball coach

Coaching career (HC unless noted)

Football
- 1904–1909: Eastern Illinois

Basketball
- 1908–1910: Eastern Illinois

Head coaching record
- Overall: 20–13–7 (football); 4–6 (basketball)

Joseph Brown was an American football and basketball coach. He was the fourth head football coach at Eastern Illinois State Normal School, now known as Eastern Illinois University, in Charleston, Illinois, serving for six seasons, from 1904 to 1909, and compiling a record of 11–10–5. Brown was also the first head basketball coach at Eastern Illinois, serving for two seasons, from 1908 to 1910, and tallying a mark of 4–6.

== Head coaching record ==
=== Football ===
Year	Team	Overall	Conference	Standing	Bowl/playoffs
Eastern Illinois Blue and Gray (Independent) (1904–1909)
1904	Eastern Illinois	6–1–1			
1905	Eastern Illinois	2–5–1			
1906	Eastern Illinois	3–1–1			
1907	Eastern Illinois	3–1–3			
1908	Eastern Illinois	6–2–1			
1909	Eastern Illinois	0–3			
Eastern Illinois:		20–13–7			
Total:		20–13–7			
