= Charles Lantz =

American sports coach and administrator (1884–1962)

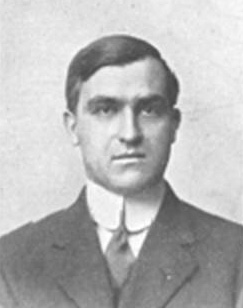
- Lantz pictured in The W'apper 1913, Eastern Illinois yearbook

Biographical details
- Born: December 14, 1884; West Fairview, Pennsylvania, U.S.
- Died: May 6, 1962 (aged 77); Naples, Florida, U.S.

Playing career

Football
- 1904–1907: Gettysburg

Basketball
- 1904–1908: Gettysburg

Baseball
- 1905–1908: Gettysburg
- Positions: Quarterback (football); Guard (basketball); Third baseman (baseball)

Coaching career (HC unless noted)

Football
- 1911–1934: Eastern Illinois
- 1944: Eastern Illinois

Basketball
- 1911–1935: Eastern Illinois
- 1943–1944: Eastern Illinois

Baseball
- 1912–1950: Eastern Illinois
- 1952: Eastern Illinois

Administrative career (AD unless noted)
- 1911–1952: Eastern Illinois

Head coaching record
- Overall: 95–66–13 (football); 197–208 (basketball); 171–216 (baseball)

Accomplishments and honors

Championships
- Football; 4 IIAC (1912–1914, 1928)

Charles Phillip Lantz (December 14, 1884 – May 6, 1962) was an American football, basketball, baseball coach and college athletics administrator. He was the sixth head football coach at Eastern Illinois University in Charleston, Illinois, serving 24 seasons, from 1911 to 1935 and again in 1944, compiling a record of 95–66–13. In 1967, the Lantz Arena complex was opened and named in his honor.

Lantz graduated from Gettysburg College in 1908. He died on May 6, 1962, in Naples, Florida.

== Head coaching record ==
=== Football ===
Year	Team	Overall	Conference	Standing	Bowl/playoffs
Eastern Illinois Blue and Gray (Independent) (1911)
1911	Eastern Illinois	4–2			
Eastern Illinois Blue and Gray / Panthers (Illinois Intercollegiate Athletic Conference) (1912–1934)
1912	Eastern Illinois	6–1		T–1st	
1913	Eastern Illinois	6–2		T–1st	
1914	Eastern Illinois	8–0–1		1st	
1915	Eastern Illinois	2–2–1			
1916	Eastern Illinois	4–3			
1917	Eastern Illinois	4–1–1			
1918	No team—World War I				
1919	Eastern Illinois	3–5–1			
1920	Eastern Illinois	2–3			
1921	Eastern Illinois	2–5–1			
1922	Eastern Illinois	4–0–2	3–0–2	2nd	
1923	Eastern Illinois	4–2–2	3–2–2	8th	
1924	Eastern Illinois	6–2	5–2	4th	
1925	Eastern Illinois	4–3–1	T–14th		
1926	Eastern Illinois	3–5–1	2–3	T–13th	
1927	Eastern Illinois	5–2	3–1	T–2nd	
1928	Eastern Illinois	7–0–1	5–0–1	T–1st	
1929	Eastern Illinois	6–1	5–1	T–3rd	
1930	Eastern Illinois	6–1–1	5–1–1	4th	
1931	Eastern Illinois	3–4	2–3	T–13th	
1932	Eastern Illinois	1–7	0–6	T–19th	
1933	Eastern Illinois	1–8	1–5	17th	
1934	Eastern Illinois	3–4	1–4	T–14th	
Eastern Illinois Panthers (Illinois Intercollegiate Athletic Conference) (1944)
1944	Eastern Illinois	1–3	1–2	4th	
Eastern Illinois:		95–66–13			
Total:		95–66–13			
National championship Conference title Conference division title or championship game berth

== See also ==
- List of college football head coaches with non-consecutive tenure
