= Clayton Miller =

American basketball coach

Biographical details
- Born: January 19, 1899; Wyanet, Illinois, U.S.
- Died: June 12, 1973 (aged 74)
- Education: Knox College

Coaching career (HC unless noted)

Football
- 1925–1940: Westville HS (IL)
- 1942: Eastern Illinois

Basketball
- 1942–1943: Eastern Illinois

Head coaching record
- Overall: 1–6 (college football); 8–10 (college basketball); 105–28 (high school football)

Clayton M. Miller (January 19, 1899 – June 12, 1973) was an American football and basketball coach. He was the tenth head football coach at Eastern Illinois State Teachers College—now known as Eastern Illinois University—in Charleston, Illinois, serving for one season, in 1942, and compiling a record of 1–7. Miller was also the head basketball coach at Eastern Illinois for the 1942–43 season, tallying a mark of 8–10. A graduate of Knox College in Galesburg, Illinois, Miller coach football at Westville High School in Westville, Illinois from 1925 to 1940, amassing a record of 105–28.

== Head coaching record ==
=== College football ===
Year	Team	Overall	Conference	Standing	Bowl/playoffs
Eastern Illinois Panthers (Illinois Intercollegiate Athletic Conference) (1942)
1942	Eastern Illinois	1–6	0–3	5th	
Eastern Illinois:		1–6	0–3		
Total:		1–6			
