= Gilbert Carson (American football) =

American football and basketball coach

Biographical details
- Born: July 8, 1901; Gunion, Wayne County, Illinois, U.S.
- Died: October 27, 1988 (aged 87); Independence, Iowa, U.S.

Coaching career (HC unless noted)

Football
- 1936–1937: Eastern Illinois
- 1939–1941: Eastern Illinois

Basketball
- 1936–1942: Eastern Illinois

Head coaching record
- Overall: 17–19–3 (football); 36–72 (basketball)

Gilbert Ted Carson (July 8, 1901 – October 27, 1988) was an American football and basketball coach. He was the eighth head football coach at Eastern Illinois State Teachers College—now known as Eastern Illinois University—in Charleston, Illinois, serving for five seasons, from 1936 to 1937 and again from 1939 to 1941, and compiling a record if 17–19–3. He married Maxine Powell. Carson was also the head basketball coach at Eastern Illinois from 1936 to 1942, tallying a mark of 36–72.

== Head coaching record ==
=== Football ===
| Year | Team | Overall | Conference | Standing | Bowl/playoffs |
|---|---|---|---|---|---|
Eastern Illinois Panthers (Illinois Intercollegiate Athletic Conference) (1936–1937)
| 1936 | Eastern Illinois | 4–4 | 2–4 | T–14th | |
| 1937 | Eastern Illinois | 3–4–1 | 1–4–1 | 18th | |
Eastern Illinois Panthers (Illinois Intercollegiate Athletic Conference) (1939–1941)
| 1939 | Eastern Illinois | 4–3–1 | 2–2–1 | 5th | |
| 1940 | Eastern Illinois | 6–1–1 | 4–1 | 3rd | |
| 1941 | Eastern Illinois | 0–7 | 0–4 | 5th | |
| Eastern Illinois: | | 17–19–3 | 9–15–2 | | |
| Total: | | 17–19–3 | | | |

== See also ==
- List of college football head coaches with non-consecutive tenure
