= Harold Railsback =

American football coach

Coaching career (HC unless noted)
- 1910: Eastern Illinois

Head coaching record
- Overall: 2–3–1

Harold Railsback was an American football coach. He was the fifth head football coach at Eastern Illinois State Normal School, now known as Eastern Illinois University, in Charleston, Illinois, serving for one season, in 1910, and compiling a record of 2–3–1.

== Head coaching record ==
| Year | Team | Overall | Conference | Standing | Bowl/playoffs |
|---|---|---|---|---|---|
Eastern Illinois Blue and Gray (Independent) (1910)
| 1910 | Eastern Illinois | 2–3–1 | | | |
| Eastern Illinois: | | 2–3–1 | | | |
| Total: | | 2–3–1 | | | |
