= Winfield Angus =

American football and basketball coach

Biographical details
- Born: January 10, 1896; Hoboken, New Jersey, U.S.
- Died: May 10, 1977 (aged 81); Dade County, Florida, U.S.

Coaching career (HC unless noted)

Football
- 1935: Eastern Illinois

Basketball
- 1935–1936: Eastern Illinois

Head coaching record
- Overall: 1–7 (football); 7–12 (basketball)

Winfield Scott Angus (January 10, 1896 – May 10, 1977) was an American football and basketball coach. He was the seventh head football coach at Eastern Illinois State Teachers College—now known as Eastern Illinois University—in Charleston, Illinois, serving for one season, in 1935, and compiling a record of 1–7. Angus was also the head basketball coach at Eastern Illinois for the 1935–36 season, tallying a mark of 7–12.

== Head coaching record ==
=== Football ===
Year	Team	Overall	Conference	Standing	Bowl/playoffs
Eastern Illinois Panthers (Illinois Intercollegiate Athletic Conference) (1935)
1935	Eastern Illinois	1–7	0–5	19th	
Eastern Illinois:		1–7	0–5		
Total:		1–7			
