= James Goff =

American athlete and coach (1912–1980)

Biographical details
- Born: May 13, 1912; Normal, Illinois, U.S.
- Died: February 28, 1980 (aged 67); Tucson, Arizona, U.S.

Playing career

Football
- c. 1930: Illinois State

Basketball
- 1930–1934: Illinois State
- 1939–1941: Hammond Ciesar All-Americans

Baseball
- c. 1934: Illinois State
- 1934: Baton Rouge Red Sticks/Clarksdale Ginners
- 1934: San Antonio Missions
- 1934: Palestine Pals
- 1935: Bloomington Bloomers
- 1935: Duluth Dukes
- 1936–1937: Davenport Blue Sox
- 1937: Fulton Eagles
- 1938: Hot Springs Bathers
- 1938: Hopkinsville Hoppers
- 1938–1939: Bloomington Bloomers
- 1939: Thomasville Orioles
- 1940–1941: Clinton Giants
- 1944: Kansas City Blues
- Positions: Halfback (football); Forward (basketball); Pitcher (baseball)

Coaching career (HC unless noted)

Football
- 1942: Millikin (assistant)
- 1945: Eastern Illinois

Basketball
- 1942–1943: Millikin
- 1944–1946: Eastern Illinois
- 1949–1957: Illinois State
- 1957–1960: Quincy

Baseball
- 1943: Millikin

Head coaching record
- Overall: 2–3–2 (football); 168–168 (basketball); 5–2 (baseball)

James Frederick "Pim" Goff (May 13, 1912 – February 28, 1980) was an American football, basketball, and baseball player and coach.

== Career ==
He was the 11th head football coach at Eastern Illinois State Teachers College—now known as Eastern Illinois University—serving for one season in 1945 season and compiling a record of 2–3–2. Goff was the head basketball coach at Millikin University in 1942–1943, at Eastern Illinois from 1944 to 1946, at Illinois State Normal University—now known as Illinois State University—from 1949 to 1957, and at Quincy College and Seminary—now known as Quincy University, compiling a career college basketball coaching record of 168–168. He was also the head baseball coach at Millikin in 1943, tallying a mark of 5–2.

Goff, whose hometown was Normal, Illinois, attended Illinois State University, where he lettered in football, tennis, basketball, baseball, and track. He also played professional baseball and professional basketball. He died in 1980 while vacationing in Tucson, Arizona.

== Head coaching record ==
=== Football ===
Year	Team	Overall	Conference	Standing	Bowl/playoffs
Eastern Illinois Panthers (Illinois Intercollegiate Athletic Conference) (1945)
1945	Eastern Illinois	2–3–2	1–1–2	T–3rd	
Eastern Illinois:		2–3–2	1–1–2		
Total:		2–3–2			
