= Rex Darling =

American football, basketball, and tennis coach

Biographical details
- Born: October 2, 1914; Lincoln, Kansas, U.S.
- Died: October 14, 1996 (aged 82); Charleston, Illinois, U.S.

Coaching career (HC unless noted)

Football
- 1945–1950: Eastern Illinois (assistant)
- 1951: Eastern Illinois

Basketball
- 1945–1964: Eastern Illinois (assistant)
- 1964–1967: Eastern Illinois

Tennis
- 1946–1974: Eastern Illinois

Head coaching record
- Overall: 4–2–2 (football); 42–55 (basketball)

Rex V. Darling (October 2, 1914 – October 14, 1996) was an American football, basketball, and tennis coach. He was the 12th head football coach at Eastern Illinois State College—now known as Eastern Illinois University—in Charleston, Illinois, serving for one season, in 1951, and compiling a record of 4–2–2. Darling was also the head basketball coach at Eastern Illinois from 1964 to 1967, tallying a mark of 42–55. He was the school's head tennis coach from 1946 to 1974.

== Head coaching record ==
=== Football ===
Year	Team	Overall	Conference	Standing	Bowl/playoffs
Eastern Illinois Panthers (Interstate Intercollegiate Athletic Conference) (1951)
1951	Eastern Illinois	4–2–2	2–2–2	4th	
Eastern Illinois:		4–2–2	2–2–2		
Total:		4–2–2			
