= Eastern Illinois Panthers football =

Intercollegiate American football team

2026 Eastern Illinois Panthers football team
- First season: 1899; 127 years ago
- Athletic director: Tom Michael
- Head coach: Chris Wilkerson; 5th season, 16–30 (.348)
- Location: Charleston, Illinois
- Stadium: O'Brien Field (capacity: 10,000)
- NCAA division: Division I FCS
- Conference: Ohio Valley
- Colors: Blue and gray
- All-time record: 537–586–44 (.479)
- Bowl record: 0–1 (.000)

NCAA Division II championships
- 1978

Conference championships
- IIAC: 1912, 1913, 1914, 1928, 1948 AMCU: 1980, 1981, 1982, 1983, 1984 GCAC: 1986 GFC: 1995 OVC: 2001, 2002, 2005, 2006, 2009, 2012, 2013
- Rivalries: Illinois State (rivalry)
- Fight song: Eastern State March
- Mascot: Billy the Panther
- Marching band: Panther Marching Band
- Outfitter: Nike
- Website: eiupanthers.com

The Eastern Illinois Panthers football program is the intercollegiate American football team for Eastern Illinois University in Charleston, Illinois. The team competes in the NCAA Division I Football Championship Subdivision (FCS) and is a member of the Ohio Valley Conference. The school's first football team was fielded in 1899. The team plays its home games at the 10,000 seat O'Brien Field, which is named after former head coach Maynard O'Brien. The school's most well-known player is former quarterback Tony Romo, who is the only Eastern Illinois player to be inducted into the College Football Hall of Fame (2021).

== History ==
The inaugural football team took the field only three weeks after the first students arrived on campus in 1899.

== Affiliations ==
=== Classifications ===
- 1960–1972: NCAA College Division (Small College)
- 1973–1980: NCAA Division II
- 1981–present: NCAA Division I FCS (Formerly Division I-AA)

=== Conference memberships ===
- 1899–1911: Independent
- 1912–1949: Illinois Intercollegiate Athletic Conference
- 1950–1969: Interstate Intercollegiate Athletic Conference
- 1970–1972: NCAA College Division Independent
- 1973–1977: NCAA Division II Independent
- 1978–1984: Association of Mid-Continent Universities
- 1985–1995: Gateway Collegiate Athletic Conference/ Gateway Football Conference
- 1996–2022: Ohio Valley Conference
- 2023–2025: OVC–Big South Football Association
- 2026–present: Ohio Valley Conference

== Championships ==
=== National championships ===
Eastern Illinois has won one national championship, doing so in 1978. They also made an appearance in the Division II National Championship Game in 1980, losing 13–21 to Cal Poly.

Year	Selector	Coach	Record	Opponent	Score
1978	Division II	Darrell Mudra	12–2	Delaware	10–9

=== Conference championships ===
Season	Conference	Coach	Overall Record	Conference Record
1912	Illinois Intercollegiate Athletic Conference	Charles Lantz	6–1	4–0
1913	Illinois Intercollegiate Athletic Conference	Charles Lantz	6–2	5–1
1914	Illinois Intercollegiate Athletic Conference	Charles Lantz	8–0–1	5–0–1
1928	Illinois Intercollegiate Athletic Conference	Charles Lantz	7–1	5–1
1948	Illinois Intercollegiate Athletic Conference	Maynard O'Brien	7–3	4–0
1980	Association of Mid-Continent Universities	Darrell Mudra	11–3	4–0
1981	Association of Mid-Continent Universities	Darrell Mudra	6–5	2–1
1982	Association of Mid-Continent Universities	Darrell Mudra	11–1–1	2–0–1
1983	Association of Mid-Continent Universities	Al Molde	9–3	3–0
1984	Association of Mid-Continent Universities	Al Molde	6–5	2–1
1986	Gateway Collegiate Athletic Conference	Al Molde	11–2	5–1
1995†	Gateway Football Conference	Bob Spoo	10–2	5–1
2001	Ohio Valley Conference	Bob Spoo	9–2	6–0
2002†	Ohio Valley Conference	Bob Spoo	8–4	5–1
2005	Ohio Valley Conference	Bob Spoo	9–3	8–0
2006	Ohio Valley Conference	Mark Hutson	8–5	7–1
2009	Ohio Valley Conference	Bob Spoo	8–4	6–2
2012	Ohio Valley Conference	Dino Babers	7–5	6–1
2013	Ohio Valley Conference	Dino Babers	12–2	8–0

† Co-champion

== Playoff appearances ==
=== NCAA Division I-AA/FCS playoffs ===
- NCAA Division I Football Championship playoff appearances: 1982, 1983, 1986, 1989, 1995, 1996, 2000, 2001, 2002, 2005, 2006, 2007, 2009, 2012, 2013, 2015
- All time playoff results

Year	First Round Home team		First Round Away team		Second Round Home		Second Round Away		Quarterfinal Home		Quarterfinal Away	
1982 ^{OT}	Eastern Illinois	16	Jackson State	13					Tennessee State	20	Eastern Illinois	19
1983 ^{2OT}	Indiana State	16	Eastern Illinois	13								
1986	Eastern Illinois	28	Murray State	21					Eastern Illinois	22	Eastern Kentucky	24
1989	Idaho	21	Eastern Illinois	38					Montana	25	Eastern Illinois	19
1995	Stephen F. Austin	34	Eastern Illinois	29								
1996	Northern Iowa	21	Eastern Illinois	14								
2000	Montana	45	Eastern Illinois	13								
2001	Eastern Illinois	43	Northern Iowa	49								
2002	Western Illinois	48	Eastern Illinois	9								
2005	Eastern Illinois	6	Southern Illinois	21								
2006	Eastern Illinois	13	Illinois State	24								
2007	Southern Illinois	30	Eastern Illinois	11								
2009	Southern Illinois	48	Eastern Illinois	7								
2012	South Dakota State	58	Eastern Illinois	10								
2013	Bye		Bye		Eastern Illinois	51	Tennessee State	10	Eastern Illinois	39	Towson	49
2015	Northern Iowa	53	Eastern Illinois	17								

=== NCAA Division II playoffs ===
The Panthers made two appearances in the Division II playoffs, with a combined record of 5-1.

Year	Round	Opponent	Result
1978	Quarterfinals; Semifinals; National Championship	UC Davis; Youngstown State; Delaware	W, 35–31; W, 26–22; W, 10–9
1980	Quarterfinals; Semifinals; National Championship	Northern Colorado; North Alabama; Cal Poly	W, 21–14; W, 56–31; L, 13–21

== Bowl games ==
Eastern Illinois has participated in one bowl game, going 0–1.

Season	Coach	Bowl	Opponent	Result
1948	Maynard O'Brien	Corn Bowl	Illinois Wesleyan	L 0–6

== Wins over FBS teams ==
Season	Opponent	Result
1989	Akron	27–17
1996	Western Michigan	28–20
1998	Northern Illinois	24–10
2004	Eastern Michigan	31–28
2013	San Diego State	40–19
2016	Miami Ohio	21–17

== All-time record vs. current OVC ==
Official record (including any NCAA imposed vacates and forfeits) against all current OVC opponents as of the completion of the 2024 season.

Opponent	Won	Lost	Pct.	First meeting
Charleston Southern	1	0	1.000	2023
Gardner–Webb	0	1	.000	2023
Lindenwood	1	2	.333	2022
Southeast Missouri State	18	14	.563	1956
UT Martin	15	15	.500	1995
Tennessee State	16	12	.571	1982
Western Illinois	22	42	.353	1930
Totals	73	86	.459	7 opponents

== Rivalries ==
=== Illinois State ===
The Mid-America Classic is the rivalry game between Illinois State and Eastern Illinois. The rivalry began in 1901 and is the second oldest in the state of Illinois. For the 100th game in the series, representatives from both schools met and developed the Mid-America Classic renaming for the rivalry. The two schools also collaborated on a traveling trophy, which holds plaques with the results of the previous 100 games in the series and has room for results of future games in the series. The two teams have played 113 times in total, with Illinois State holding a 61–43–9 advantage in the all-time series as of the end of the 2025 game.

== Head coaches ==
No.	Years	Name
1	1899–1901	Otis Caldwell
2	1902	Thornton Smallwood
3	1903	Thomas Briggs
4	1904–1909	Joseph Brown
5	1910	Harold Railsback
6	1911–1934, 44	Charles Lantz
7	1935	Winfield Angus
8	1936–1937, 39–41	Gilbert Carson
9	1938	Harold Ave
10	1942	Clayton Miller
11	1945	James Goff
12	1946–1950, 52–55	Maynard O'Brien
13	1951	Rex Darling
14	1956	Keith Smith
15	1957–1964	Ralph Kohl
16	1965–1971	Clyde Biggers
17	1972–1974	Jack Dean
18	1975–1977	John Konstantinos
19	1978–1982	Darrell Mudra
20	1983–1986	Al Molde
21	1987–2005, 07–11	Bob Spoo
22	2006	Mark Hutson
23	2012–2013	Dino Babers
24	2014–2018	Kim Dameron
25	2019–2021	Adam Cushing
26	2022–present	Chris Wilkerson

# Interim head coach

== Individual accomplishments ==
=== 1st Team All Americans ===
Selectors: AP-Associated Press, AFCA-American Football Coaches Association, FBG-FB Gazette, SN-Sports Network, WC-Walter Camp Football Foundation

Player	Year	Organization
Nate Anderson	1972	AFCA
Ted Petersen	1976	AP
James Warring	1978	AP, AFCA
Pete Catan	1979, 1980	AP, AFCA
Poke Cobb	1979	AP, AFCA
Kevin Gray	1981	AFCA
Robert Williams	1982, 1983	AP, AFCA
Bob Norris	1982	AP
Chris Nicholson	1983	AP
Jerry Wright	1984	AFCA
Roy Banks	1986	AP, AFCA
John Jurkovic	1988, 1989	AP, AFCA, SN
Tim Lance	1990	AP, SN, WC
Dan Dee	1992	WC, SN
Tim Carver	1995	FBG
Willie High	1995	FBG
J.R. Taylor	2002	AP, FBG, SN, WC
Nick Ricks	2002	AP, FBG, SN
Kevin Hill	2002	FBG, SN, WC
Tony Romo	2002	AP, AFCA, SN, WC
Clint Sellers	2005	AFCA, FBG
Tristan Burge	2006	AFCA
Erik Lora	2012, 2013	AP, AFCA, SN, WC
Jimmy Garoppolo	2013	AP, AFCA, SN, WC
Collin Seibert	2013, 2014	AP, AFCA, SN, WC
Dino Fanti	2015	AFCA

=== Award winners ===
- Walter Payton Award
  Tony Romo - 2002
  Jimmy Garoppolo - 2013
- Walter Payton Award finalists
  Tim Lance - 1990...3rd
  Willie High - 1994...15th
  Tony Romo - 2000...11th
  Tony Romo - 2001...10th
  Jimmy Garoppolo - 2012...10th
  Erik Lora - 2012...4th
  Erik Lora - 2013...7th
  Alexander Hollins - 2018...21st

=== College Football Hall of Fame members ===
Eastern Illinois has two inductees in the College Football Hall of Fame as of 2021.

Name	Position	Years	Inducted	Ref.
Darrell Mudra	Coach	1978–1982	2000	
Tony Romo	QB	1999–2002	2021	

== Retired numbers ==
Eastern Illinois Panthers retired numbers
No.	Player	Pos.	Tenure	Date retired	Ref.
17	Tony Romo	QB	1999–2002	October 17, 2009	
18	Sean Payton	QB	1983–1986	September 11, 2010	

== Future non-conference opponents ==
Announced schedules as of November 3, 2026.

2027	2028	2029
at Ole Miss	at Illinois State	at Indiana State
Murray State	Indiana State	at Indiana
at Tennessee Tech	at Kentucky	
Illinois State		

== Notable former players ==
Notable alumni include the following.

- Evan Arapostathis
- Greg Brown
- Anthony Buich
- Tristan Burge
- Pete Catan
- Brad Childress
- Jake Christensen
- Jeff Christensen
- Frank Cutolo
- Rob DeVita
- Ron Ellett
- Ray Fisher
- Jimmy Garoppolo
- Jeff Gossett
- Kamu Grugier-Hill
- Mike Heimerdinger
- Lenny High
- Alexander Hollins
- Otis Hudson
- Burl Ives
- John Jurkovic
- Tim Kelly
- Andrew Manley
- Pascal Matla
- Ray McElroy
- Greg McMahon
- Randy Melvin
- John Moyer
- Ryan Pace
- Steve Parker
- Sean Payton
- Ted Petersen
- Tony Romo
- Micah Rucker
- Terrance Sanders
- Mike Shanahan
- Chris Szarka
- Jeff Thorne
- Chevon Walker
- Pierre Walters
- Chris Watson
- Chris Wilkerson
