= List of Arkansas State Red Wolves football seasons =

The following is a list of Arkansas State Red Wolves football seasons for the football team that has represented Arkansas State University in NCAA competition.

== Seasons ==
Year	Coach	Overall	Conference	Standing	Bowl/playoffs	Coaches^{#}	AP^{°}
Independent (1911–1929)
1911	F. T. Parks	1–1					
1912	F. T. Parks	3–1					
1913	Clinton Young	3–1–1					
1914	Earl W. Brannon	4–3					
1915	Earl W. Brannon	4–1–1					
1916	Earl W. Brannon	4–3					
1917	Earl W. Brannon	4–2–1					
1918	No team						
1919	Foy Hammons	2–5					
1920	Foy Hammons	3–3					
1921	Foy Hammons	3–2–1					
1922	Tom Dandelet	0–7					
1923	Tom Dandelet	0–6–1					
1924	Basil Stanley	4–4					
1925	Herbert Schwartz	4–3–1					
1926	Herbert Schwartz	4–3–1					
1927	Herbert Schwartz	4–3					
1928	Herbert Schwartz	3–3–1					
1929	Herbert Schwartz	2–5					
Arkansas Intercollegiate Conference (1930–1950)
1930	Herbert Schwartz	1–4–3					
1931	Jack Dale	6–2					
1932	Jack Dale (coach)	3–4					
1933	Elza T. Renfro	2–4–2					
1934	Tommy Mills	2–5–1					
1935	Tommy Mills	2–7					
1936	Leslie Speck	3–5					
1937	Leslie Speck	1–5					
1938	Leslie Speck	3–3					
1939	Bill Adams	4–3					
1940	Bill Adams	1–4–2					
1941	Bill Adams	0–7					
1942	No team						
1943	No team						
1944	No team						
1945	Ike Tomlinson	2–4–1					
1946	Forrest England	4–3–3					
1947	Forrest England	4–2–3					
1948	Forrest England	4–4–1					
1949	Forrest England	5–4					
1950	Forrest England	6–3					
Independent (1951–1963)
1951	Forrest England	10–2					
1952	Forrest England	8–3					
1953	Forrest England	8–0–2					
1954	Glen Harmeson	1–8					
1955	Gene Harlow	6–3					
1956	Gene Harlow	5–4					
1957	Gene Harlow	4–5					
1958	Hugh Taylor	4–5					
1959	Hugh Taylor	3–6					
1960	King Block	4–5					
1961	King Block	3–6					
1962	King Block	6–3					
1963	Bennie Ellender	2–6					
Southland Conference (1964–1986)
1964	Bennie Ellender	7–0–2					
1965	Bennie Ellender	6–3					
1966	Bennie Ellender	7–2					
1967	Bennie Ellender	4–5					
1968	Bennie Ellender	7–3–1	3–0–1	1st	L Pecan		
1969	Bennie Ellender	8–1–1	4–0	1st	W Pecan	5	7
1970	Bennie Ellender	11–0	4–0	1st	W Pecan	1	1
1971	Bill Davidson	4–4–1	1–3–1	5th			
1972	Bill Davidson	3–8					
1973	Bill Davidson	7–3					
1974	Bill Davidson	7–3					
1975	Bill Davidson	11–0	5–0	1st			
1976	Bill Davidson	5–6					
1977	Bill Davidson	7–4					
1978	Bill Davidson	7–4					
1979	Larry Lacewell	4–7					
1980	Larry Lacewell	2–9					
1981	Larry Lacewell	6–5					
1982	Larry Lacewell	5–6					
1983	Larry Lacewell	5–5–1					
1984	Larry Lacewell	8–4–1	4–1–1	2nd	L I–AA Quarterfinals		
1985	Larry Lacewell	9–4	5–1	1st	L I–AA Quarterfinals		
1986	Larry Lacewell	12–2–1	5–0	1st	L I–AA Championship		
Independent (1987–1992)
1987	Larry Lacewell	8–4–1			L I–AA Quarterfinals		
1988	Larry Lacewell	5–6					
1989	Larry Lacewell	5–6					
1990	Al Kincaid	3–7–1					
1991	Al Kincaid	1–10					
1992	Ray Perkins	2–9					
Big West Conference (1993–1995)
1993	John Bobo	2–8–1	1–5	10th			
1994	John Bobo	1–10	0–6	10th			
1995	John Bobo	6–5	3–3	T–4th			
Independent (1996–1998)
1996	John Bobo	4–7					
1997	Joe Hollis	2–9					
1998	Joe Hollis	4–8					
Big West Conference (1999–2000)
1999	Joe Hollis	4–7	2–3	5th			
2000	Joe Hollis	1–10	1–4	6th			
Sun Belt Conference (2001–present)
2001	Joe Hollis	2–9	2–4	T–4th			
2002	Steve Roberts	6–7	3–3	3rd			
2003	Steve Roberts	5–7	3–3	T–3rd			
2004	Steve Roberts	3–8	3–4	6th			
2005	Steve Roberts	2^–6	1^–2	T–1st	L New Orleans		
2006	Steve Roberts	0^–6	0^–3	T–3rd			
2007	Steve Roberts	5–7	3–4	T–5th			
2008	Steve Roberts	6–6	4–3	T–3rd			
2009	Steve Roberts	4–8	3–5	T–6th			
2010	Steve Roberts	4–8	4–4	T–4th			
2011	Hugh Freeze	10–3	8–0	1st	L GoDaddy		
2012	Gus Malzahn	10–3	7–1	1st	W GoDaddy		
2013	Bryan Harsin	8–5	5–2	1st	W GoDaddy		
2014	Blake Anderson	7–6	5–3	T–4th	L GoDaddy		
2015	Blake Anderson	9–4	8–0	1st	L New Orleans		
2016	Blake Anderson	8–5	7–1	T–1st	W Cure		
2017	Blake Anderson	7–5	6–2	3rd	L Camellia		
2018	Blake Anderson	8–5	5–3	T–1st (West)	L Arizona		
2019	Blake Anderson	8–5	5–3	2nd (West)	W Camellia		
2020	Blake Anderson	4–7	2–6	T–3rd (West)			
2021	Butch Jones	2–10	1–7	5th (West)			
2022	Butch Jones	3–9	1–7	7th (West)			
2023	Butch Jones	6–7	4–4	T–2nd (West)	L Camellia		
2024	Butch Jones	8–5	5–3	T–2nd (West)	W 68 Ventures		
Total:							
National championship Conference title Conference division title or championship game berth
^{†}Indicates Bowl Coalition, Bowl Alliance, BCS, or CFP / New Years' Six bowl.; ^{#}Rankings from final Coaches Poll.; ^4 wins in 2005 and 6 wins in 2006 later vacated due to NCAA sanctions. On–field record was 6–6 for both seasons.
