= Abe Martin (Illinois coach) =

American sports coach, college athletics administrator

Biographical details
- Born: January 19, 1906; Burnt Prairie, Illinois, U.S.
- Died: April 17, 1997 (aged 91); Springfield, Illinois, U.S.

Playing career

Football
- 1929–1931: Southern Illinois
- 1932: Chicago Cardinals

Coaching career (HC unless noted)

Football
- 1933–1935: Fairfield HS (IL)
- 1936: Pontiac HS (IL)
- 1937: Princeton HS (IL)
- 1938: Southern Illinois (assistant)
- 1939–1949: Southern Illinois

Basketball
- 1933–1936: Fairfield HS (IL)
- 1936–1937: Pontiac HS (IL)
- 1937–1938: Princeton HS (IL)
- 1943–1946: Southern Illinois

Baseball
- 1947–1965: Southern Illinois

Administrative career (AD unless noted)
- 1945–1953: Southern Illinois

Head coaching record
- Overall: 31–42–5 (college football); 43–20 (college basketball); 281–156–2 (college baseball)
- Tournaments: Basketball; 7–1 (NAIA)

Accomplishments and honors

Championships
- Football; 1 IIAC (1947) Basketball; 1 NAIA (1946)

Morris Glenn Martin (January 19, 1906 – April 17, 1997), also known as Abe Martin, was an American football player, coach of football, basketball and baseball, and college athletics administrator. He was the fifth head football coach at the Southern Illinois University Carbondale (SIU), serving from 1939 to 1949 and compiling a record of 31–42–5. Martin was the school's head basketball coach from 1943 to 1946, tallying a mark of 43–20, head baseball coach from 1947 to 1965, amassing a record of 281–156–2. He was also the athletic director from 1945 to 1953.

On April 30, 1972, Southern Illinois' baseball field was dedicated in honor of Martin, who retired from the athletic department in 1971. The field was later renamed in honor of a different coach in 2014.

== Coaching career ==
Martin began his coaching career in 1933 at Fairfield High School in Fairfield, Illinois. He moved to Pontiac High School in Pontiac, Illinois in 1936 and then to Princeton High School in Princeton, Illinois a year later. He was hired at Southern Illinois Normal University—now known as Southern Illinois University Carbondale—as an assistant football coach in 1938. Martin succeeded William McAndrew as head football coach at Southern Illinois in 1939.

== Death ==
Martin died on April 17, 1997, at a retirement home Springfield, Illinois.

== Head coaching record ==
=== College football ===
Year	Team	Overall	Conference	Standing	Bowl/playoffs
Southern Illinois Maroons (Illinois Intercollegiate Athletic Conference) (1939–1949)
1939	Southern Illinois	0–8	0–4	8th	
1940	Southern Illinois	2–5–1	0–3–1	T–6th	
1941	Southern Illinois	5–2–1	2–1–1	3rd	
1942	Southern Illinois	2–4	1–3	4th	
1943	No team—World War II				
1944	Southern Illinois	3–3	2–1	3rd	
1945	Southern Illinois	4–1–2	2–1–1	2nd	
1946	Southern Illinois	4–4	3–1	2nd	
1947	Southern Illinois	7–2–1	3–0–1	1st	
1948	Southern Illinois	2–6	0–4	5th	
1949	Southern Illinois	2–7	0–4	5th	
Southern Illinois:		31–42–5	13–22		
Total:		31–42–5			
National championship Conference title Conference division title or championship game berth
