= 1938 Southern Illinois Maroons football team =

American college football season

1938 Southern Illinois Maroons football
- Conference: Illinois Intercollegiate Athletic Conference
- Record: 2–7 (0–4 IIAC)
- Head coach: William McAndrew (22nd season)

1938 Illinois Intercollegiate Athletic Conference football standings
	Conf.					Overall
Team	W		L		T	W		L		T
Northern Illinois State $	4	–	0	–	0	6	–	1	–	1
Carthage	3	–	0	–	0	6	–	1	–	1
Illinois State Normal	4	–	1	–	0	5	–	4	–	1
Western Illinois	2	–	2	–	0	4	–	3	–	1
Eastern Illinois	1	–	3	–	0	5	–	3	–	0
Elmhurst	1	–	3	–	0	2	–	5	–	0
Eureka	0	–	2	–	0	1	–	6	–	0
Southern Illinois	0	–	4	–	0	2	–	7	–	0

The 1938 Southern Illinois Maroons football team was an American football team that represented Southern Illinois Normal University (now known as Southern Illinois University Carbondale) in the Illinois Intercollegiate Athletic Conference (IIAC) during the 1938 college football season. In its 22nd and final season under head coach William McAndrew, the team compiled a 2–7 record.

== Schedule ==
Date	Opponent	Site	Result	Attendance	Source
September 24	at Illinois Wesleyan*	Wilder Field; Bloomington, IL	L 0–19	1,600	
October 1	Cape Girardeau*	McAndrew Stadium; Carbondale, IL	L 0–27		
October 8	at Northern Illinois State	Glidden Field; DeKalb, IL	L 0–26		
October 15	Arkansas State*	McAndrew Stadium; Carbondale, IL	W 6–0		
October 22	at Western Illinois	Morgan Field; Macomb, IL	L 0–19		
October 29	Illinois State Normal	McAndrew Stadium; Carbondale, IL	L 0–6		
November 4	at Cape Girardeau*	Houck Stadium; Cape Girardeau, MO	W 6–0		
November 11	at Eastern Illinois	Schahrer Field; Charleston, IL	L 0–15		
November 19	Austin Peay*	McAndrew Stadium; Carbondale, IL	L 9–12		
*Non-conference game
