= 1939 Western Illinois Leathernecks football team =

American college football season

1939 Western Illinois Leathernecks football

IIAC champion
- Conference: Illinois Intercollegiate Athletic Conference
- Record: 5–1–1 (3–0–1 IIAC)
- Head coach: Ray Hanson (14th season)
- Home stadium: Morgan Field

1939 Illinois Intercollegiate Athletic Conference football standings
	Conf.					Overall
Team	W		L		T	W		L		T
Western Illinois $	3	–	0	–	1	5	–	1	–	1
Illinois State Normal	3	–	0	–	2	4	–	2	–	3
Northern Illinois State	3	–	1	–	0	5	–	2	–	1
Carthage	2	–	1	–	0	2	–	6	–	1
Eastern Illinois	2	–	2	–	1	4	–	3	–	1
Elmhurst	1	–	4	–	0	1	–	6	–	1
Eureka	0	–	2	–	0	0	–	7	–	0
Southern Illinois	0	–	4	–	0	0	–	8	–	0
$ – Conference champion

The 1939 Western Illinois Leathernecks football team represented Western Illinois University as a member of the Illinois Intercollegiate Athletic Conference (IIAC) during the 1939 college football season. They were led by 14th-year head coach Ray Hanson and played their home games at Morgan Field. The Leathernecks finished the season with a 5–1–1 record overall and a 3–0–1 record in conference play, winning the IIAC title.

== Schedule ==
Date	Opponent	Site	Result	Source
September 23	William Penn*	Morgan Field; Macomb, IL	W 9–6	
September 30	at Parsons*	Fairfield, IA	L 6–12	
October 14	Illinois State Normal	Morgan Field; Macomb, IL	T 0–0	
October 21	at Southern Illinois	McAndrew Stadium; Carbondale, IL	W 20–7	
October 28	Eastern Illinois^{†}	Morgan Field; Macomb, IL	W 20–7	
November 3	Burlington*	Morgan Field; Macomb, IL	W 25–21	
November 11	at Carthage	Carthage, IL	W 14–7	
*Non-conference game; ^{†}Homecoming
