= 1940 Illinois State Normal Redbirds football team =

American college football season

1940 Illinois State Normal Redbirds football

IIAC champion
- Conference: Illinois Intercollegiate Athletic Conference
- Record: 5–3–1 (4–0 IIAC)
- Head coach: Howard Hancock (10th season)
- MVP: Harold Gaffney
- Captain: Jack Secord
- Home stadium: McCormick Field

1940 Illinois Intercollegiate Athletic Conference football standings
	Conf.					Overall
Team	W		L		T	W		L		T
Illinois State Normal $	4	–	0	–	0	5	–	3	–	1
Carthage	2	–	0	–	0	5	–	2	–	1
Eastern Illinois	4	–	1	–	0	6	–	1	–	1
Northern Illinois State	2	–	2	–	0	6	–	3	–	0
Elmhurst	1	–	2	–	0	2	–	5	–	1
Western Illinois	0	–	3	–	1	1	–	6	–	1
Southern Illinois	0	–	3	–	1	2	–	5	–	1
Eureka	0	–	2	–	0	2	–	5	–	1

The 1940 Illinois State Normal Redbirds football team represented Illinois State Normal University—now known as Illinois State University—as a member of the Illinois Intercollegiate Athletic Conference (IIAC) during the 1940 college football season. Led by tenth-year head coach Howard Hancock, the Redbirds compiled an overall record of 5–3–1 with a mark of 4–0 in conference play, winning the IIAC title.

Illinois State Normal was ranked at No. 266 (out of 697 college football teams) in the final rankings under the Litkenhous Difference by Score system for 1940.

Illinois State Normal played home games at McCormick Field in Normal, Illinois.

== Schedule ==
Date	Opponent	Site	Result	Source
September 21	Eastern Kentucky*	McCormick Field; Normal, IL	L 0–20	
September 28	Platteville State*	McCormick Field; Normal, IL	W 27–0	
October 4	at Michigan State Normal*	Briggs Field; Ypsilanti, MI	T 0–0	
October 12	at Indiana State*	Terre Haute, IN	L 0–6	
October 19	Eastern Illinois^{†}	McCormick Field; Normal, IL (rivalry)	W 30–12	
October 26	at Southern Illinois	McAndrew Stadium; Carbondale, IL	W 25–6	
November 1	at Western Illinois	Macomb, IL	W 36–0	
November 9	Northern Illinois State	McCormick Field; Normal, IL	W 26–14	
November 20	Illinois Wesleyan*	McCormick Field; Normal, IL	L 6–32	
*Non-conference game; ^{†}Homecoming
