= 1936 Arkansas State Indians football team =

American college football season

1936 Arkansas State Indians football
- Conference: Arkansas Intercollegiate Conference
- Record: 3–5 (2–2 AIC)
- Head coach: Leslie Speck (1st season)
- Home stadium: Kays Field

The 1936 Arkansas State Indians football team represented Arkansas State College—now known as Arkansas State University—as a member of the Arkansas Intercollegiate Conference (AIC) during the 1936 college football season. Led by second-year head coach Leslie Speck, the Indians compiled an overall record of 3–5 with a mark of 2–2 in conference play.

== Schedule ==
Date	Opponent	Site	Result	Source
September 19	Southwestern (TN)*	Kays Field; Jonesboro, AR	L 0–44	
September 26	at Southern Illinois*	Carbondale, IL	W 7–3	
October 2	at Delta State*	Delta Field; Cleveland, MS	L 6–53	
October 9	at Tennessee Junior College*	Martin, TN	L 0–34	
October 16	Hendrix	Kays Field; Jonesboro, AR	L 7–28	
October 31	Arkansas A&M	Kays Field; Jonesboro, AR	W 7–6	
November 13	at Magnolia A&M	Magnolia, AR	W 13–6	
November 20	at Arkansas State Teachers	Conway, AR	L 7–14	
*Non-conference game
