= 1945 Arkansas State Indians football team =

American college football season

1945 Arkansas State Indians football
- Conference: Arkansas Intercollegiate Conference
- Record: 2–4–1 (2–1 AIC)
- Head coach: Ike Tomlinson (1st season)
- Home stadium: Kays Stadium

The 1945 Arkansas State Indians football team represented Arkansas State College—now known as Arkansas State University—as a member of the Arkansas Intercollegiate Conference (AIC) during the 1945 college football season. Led by first-year head coach Ike Tomlinson, the Indians compiled am overall record of 2–4–1 with a mark of 2–1 in conference play.

== Schedule ==
Date	Opponent	Site	Result	Source
September 22	Southern Illinois*	Kays Stadium; Jonesboro, AR	L 0–6	
October 6	at Southern Illinois*	McAndrew Stadium; Carbondale, IL	T 6–6	
October 11	at Arkansas State Teachers	Estes Stadium; Conway, AR	W 18–0	
October 28	at Mississippi State B team*	Scott Field; Starkville, MS	L 0–43	
November 3	at Illinois Wesleyan*	Municipal Stadium; Bloomington, IL	L 6–27	
November 9	Henderson State	Kays Stadium; Jonesboro, AR	L 0–13	
November 16	Arkansas State Teachers	Kays Stadium; Jonesboro, AR	W 21–0	
*Non-conference game
