= 1939 Southern Illinois Maroons football team =

American college football season

1939 Southern Illinois Maroons football
- Conference: Illinois Intercollegiate Athletic Conference
- Record: 0–8 (0–4 IIAC)
- Head coach: Glenn Martin (1st season)
- Captains: George Holliday; Elbert Smith
- Home stadium: McAndrew Stadium

1939 Illinois Intercollegiate Athletic Conference football standings
	Conf.					Overall
Team	W		L		T	W		L		T
Western Illinois $	3	–	0	–	1	5	–	1	–	1
Illinois State Normal	3	–	0	–	2	4	–	2	–	3
Northern Illinois State	3	–	1	–	0	5	–	2	–	1
Carthage	2	–	1	–	0	2	–	6	–	1
Eastern Illinois	2	–	2	–	1	4	–	3	–	1
Elmhurst	1	–	4	–	0	1	–	6	–	1
Eureka	0	–	2	–	0	0	–	7	–	0
Southern Illinois	0	–	4	–	0	0	–	8	–	0
$ – Conference champion

The 1939 Southern Illinois Maroons football team was an American football team that represented Southern Illinois Normal University (now known as Southern Illinois University Carbondale) in the Illinois Intercollegiate Athletic Conference (IIAC) during the 1939 college football season. Under first-year head coach Glenn Martin, the team compiled a 0–8 record and finished in last place in the IIAC. The team played its home games at McAndrew Stadium in Carbondale, Illinois.

George Holliday, a fullback from Elkville, and Elbert Smith, a tackle from Carterville, were the team captains. Quarterback Bob Musgrave was the team's only representative on the Associated Press All-Illinois Intercollegiate Conference football team. Other key players included Heine Stumpf and Bill Groves.

== Schedule ==
Date	Opponent	Site	Result	Source
September 29	at Cape Girardeau*	Houck Field Stadium; Cape Girardeau, MO	L 2–9	
October 14	at Arkansas State*	Kays Stadium; Jonesboro, AR	L 0–7	
October 21	Western Illinois^{†}	McAndrew Stadium; Carbondale, IL	L 7–20	
October 28	at Illinois State Normal	McCormick Field; Normal, IL	L 7–13	
November 4	Northern Illinois State	McAndrew Stadium; Carbondale, IL	L 0–13	
November 10	Eastern Illinois	McAndrew Stadium; Carbondale, IL	L 7–12	
November 18	Austin Peay*	McAndrew Stadium; Carbondale, IL	L 6–26	
November 23	Cape Girardeau*	McAndrew Stadium; Carbondale, IL	L 0–24	
*Non-conference game; ^{†}Homecoming
