= Old Morrison Mill =

- U.S. National Register of Historic Places
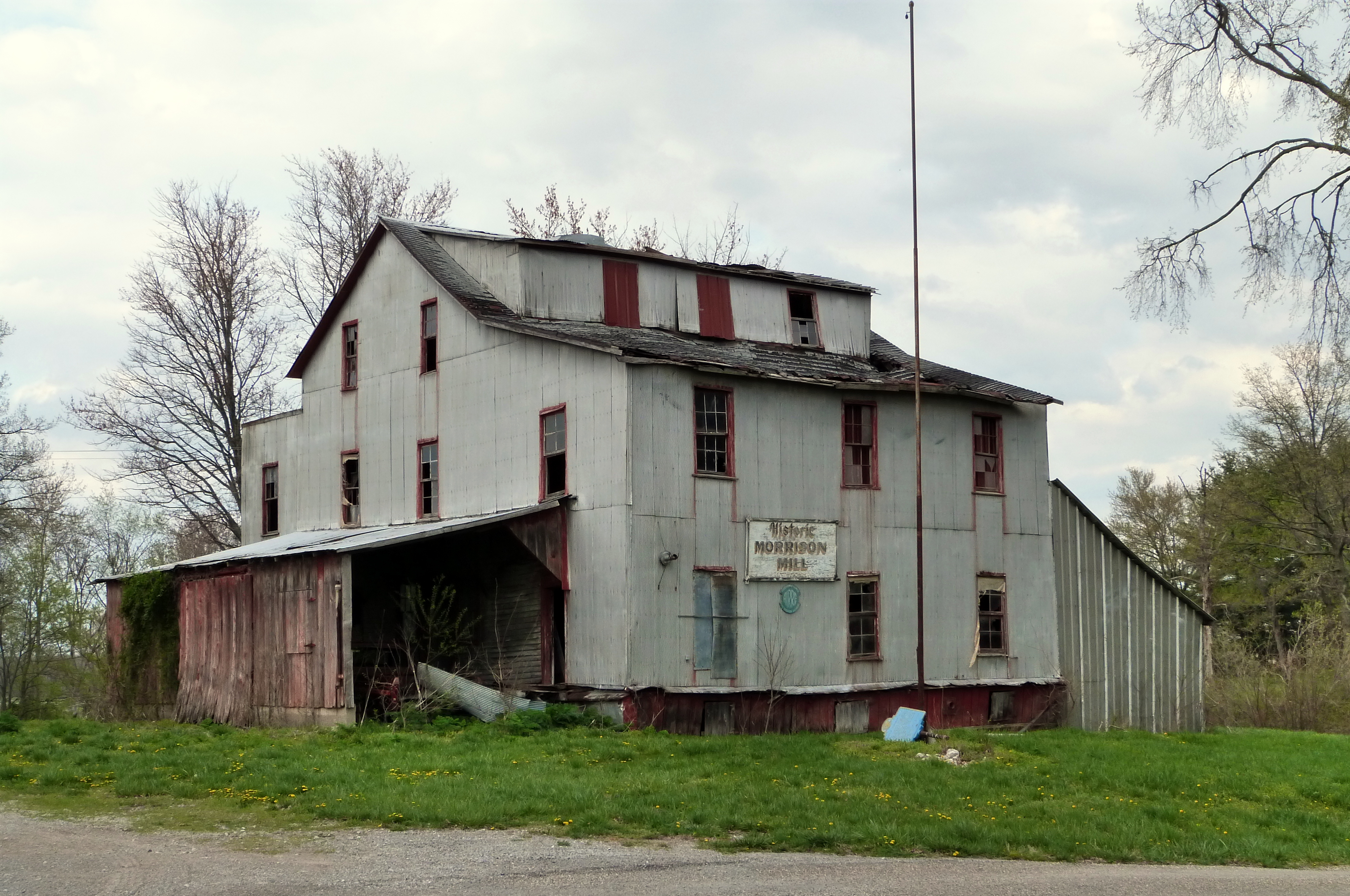

- Location within Illinois Location within the United States
- Location: Off Liberty Rd., Burnt Prairie, Illinois
- Coordinates: 38°14′59″N 88°15′30″W
- Area: less than one acre
- Built: 1859
- NRHP reference No.: 84001169
- Added to NRHP: July 11, 1984

The Old Morrison Mill is a historic gristmill in Burnt Prairie, Illinois. The mill was originally constructed in 1859 in Enfield and was moved to Burnt Prairie in the late nineteenth century, replacing another mill built in 1820. The mill served as the farming community's local grain processing facility, converting wheat to flour and corn to meal. While the mill was originally horse-powered, a wood-fueled boiler was installed in 1897; the boiler's power source later changed to coal, a diesel engine, and ultimately electricity. Parkin and Martin owned the mill after its relocation to Burnt Prairie until brothers R.S. and Cal Morrison purchased it in 1897. R.S. Morrison died in 1931; his sons continued to operate the mill with Cal until 1963. The mill currently sits vacant and houses a variety of well-preserved milling tools and machinery.

The mill was added to the National Register of Historic Places on July 11, 1984. As of December 2017, a portion of the building had collapsed.

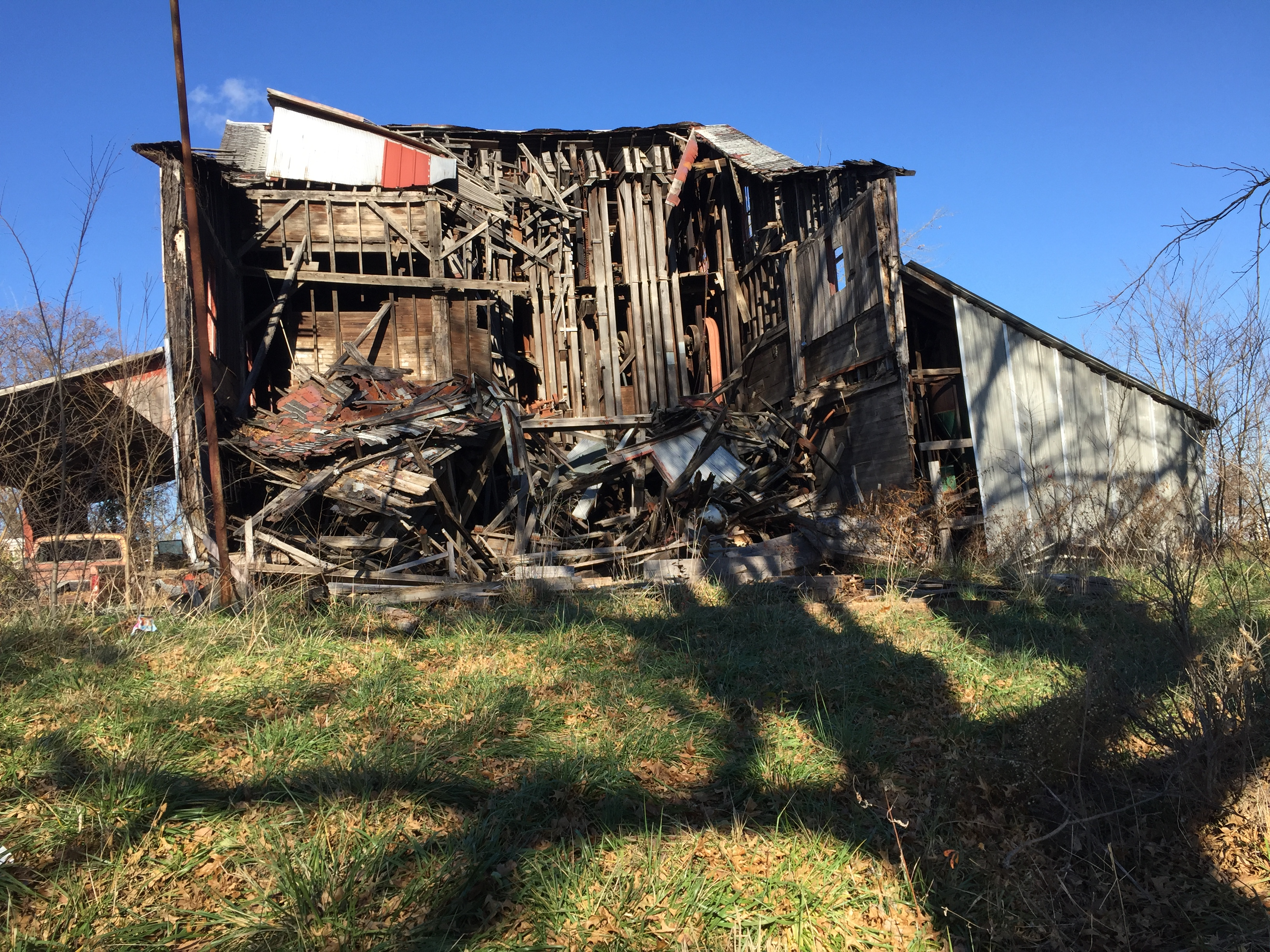
The mill by December, 2017
