= 1936 Southern Illinois Maroons football team =

American college football season

1936 Southern Illinois Maroons football
- Conference: Illinois Intercollegiate Athletic Conference
- Record: 3–4–1 (3–2–1 IIAC)
- Head coach: William McAndrew (20th season)

1936 Illinois Intercollegiate Athletic Conference football standings
	Conf.					Overall
Team	W		L		T	W		L		T
Illinois Wesleyan +	5	–	0	–	1	5	–	3	–	1
St. Viator +	3	–	0	–	0	5	–	2	–	0
Bradley	6	–	2	–	0	6	–	3	–	0
North Central	3	–	1	–	1	4	–	2	–	1
Lake Forest	2	–	1	–	0	4	–	2	–	1
Wheaton (IL)	2	–	1	–	2	3	–	2	–	2
Southern Illinois	3	–	2	–	1	2	–	7	–	0
Western Illinois	3	–	2	–	1	3	–	2	–	2
Northern Illinois State	3	–	2	–	1	4	–	3	–	1
Illinois College	2	–	2	–	1	4	–	3	–	1
Monmouth (IL)	2	–	2	–	0	4	–	4	–	0
Augustana (IL)	3	–	3	–	0	3	–	5	–	0
Illinois State Normal	2	–	3	–	1	3	–	4	–	2
Millikin	2	–	4	–	0	3	–	5	–	0
Eastern Illinois	2	–	4	–	0	4	–	4	–	0
Knox (IL)	1	–	2	–	0	3	–	5	–	0
Eureka	2	–	5	–	1	2	–	5	–	1
Elmhurst	1	–	3	–	1	3	–	3	–	1
Carthage	1	–	4	–	1	2	–	5	–	1
Shurtleff	0	–	1	–	0	0	–	4	–	0
McKendree	0	–	4	–	0	2	–	6	–	0
+ – Conference co-champions

The 1936 Southern Illinois Maroons football team was an American football team that represented Southern Illinois Normal University (now known as Southern Illinois University Carbondale) in the Illinois Intercollegiate Athletic Conference (IIAC) during the 1936 college football season. In its 20th season under head coach William McAndrew, the team compiled a 3–4–1 record.

== Schedule ==
Date	Opponent	Site	Result	Source
September 26	Arkansas State*	Carbondale, IL	L 3–7	
October 3	Illinois State	Carbondale, IL	W 6–0	
October 10	at Northern Illinois State	Glidden Field; DeKalb, IL	L 2–14	
October 17	McKendree	Carbondale, IL	W 13–0	
October 24	at Western Illinois	Morgan Field; Macomb, IL	T 7–7	
November 6	Cape Girardeau*	Carbondale, IL	L 4–6	
November 13	Eastern Illinois	Carbondale, IL	W 13–7	
November 21	St. Viator	Carbondale, IL	L 2–7	
*Non-conference game
