= 1941 Arkansas State Indians football team =

American college football season

1941 Arkansas State Indians football
- Conference: Arkansas Intercollegiate Conference
- Record: 0–7 (0–1 AIC)
- Head coach: Bill Adams (3rd season)
- Home stadium: Kays Stadium

The 1941 Arkansas State Indians football team represented Arkansas State College—now known as Arkansas State University—as a member of the Arkansas Intercollegiate Conference (AIC) during the 1941 college football season. Led by third-year head coach Bill Adams, the Indians compiled an overall record of 0–7 with a mark of 0–1 in conference play.

== Schedule ==
| Date | Opponent | Site | Result | Source |
|---|---|---|---|---|
| September 20 | at Missouri Mines* | Rolla, MO | L 0–46 | |
| September 26 | at Cape Girardeau* | Houck Stadium; Cape Girardeau, MO | L 0–44 | |
| October 3 | Sunflower Junior* | Kays Stadium; Jonesboro, AR | L 0–68 | |
| October 11 | Southern Illinois* | Kays Stadium; Jonesboro, AR | L 0–27 | |
| October 23 | at Austin Peay* | Murtland Field; Clarksville, TN | L 0–34 | |
| October 30 | at Union (TN)* | Jackson Stadium; Jackson, TN | L 0–70 | |
| November 8 | Magnolia A&M | Kays Stadium; Jonesboro, AR | L 0–19 | |
*Non-conference game
