= Earl W. Brannon =

American football coach

Biographical details
- Born: August 5, 1889; Belvidere, Nebraska, U.S.
- Died: December 1, 1952 (aged 63); Columbus, Ohio, U.S.
- Education: University of Nebraska

Coaching career (HC unless noted)
- 1914–1917: Jonesboro Aggies

Head coaching record
- Overall: 16–9–2

Earl William Brannon (August 5, 1889 – December 1, 1952) was an American college football coach. He served as the head football coach at the First District Agricultural School of Jonesboro, Arkansas—now known as Arkansas State University—from 1914 to 1917, compiling a record of 16–9–2. Brannon's wife, Cozette, served as his assistant coach and was the only female football coach in the United States at that time.

== Early life ==
Brannon was born on August 5, 1889 in Belvidere, Nebraska. He was a star athlete at Lincoln High School in Lincoln, Nebraska. He attended the International Young Men's Christian Association Training School in Springfield, Massachusetts for a year and a half and served as the physical director at the YMCA in David City, Nebraska for a year. In 1913, he graduated from the University of Nebraska. While still in college, he began a career in journalism. He served as the sporting editor at the Lincoln Star, The Kansas City Star, and Omaha World-Herald.

== Personal life ==
On March 19, 1913, Brannon married Cozette McManigell of Lincoln, Nebraska. They had three children, Earl Jr., Charles, and Mary Jane. Cozette Brannon died on August 21, 1945 from a heart ailment. Charles Bannon was killed in the Korean War and is buried in Arlington National Cemetery. Earl Brannon Jr. was a physician and brigadier general in the United States Air Force who was commander of the David Grant USAF Medical Center and served on the medical support time for Project Mercury and Project Gemini, including the first United States human spaceflight.

== Coaching ==
In 1914, Brannon became the head of the English department and head football coach at the State Agricultural College at Jonesboro, Arkansas. In 1915, his wife, Cozette, performed advance scouting, helped direct practice, and assisted with game planning. In 1916, she coached the second team, which played against high school teams. The school could only afford one football coach and typically a member of the faculty volunteered to coach the second time. However, there was no one else on the faculty with a suitable knowledge of the game. Cozette Brannon was the first woman college football coach.

== World War I ==
On January 18, 1918, Brannon resigned from the college to work for the YMCA's military recreation program. He was the physical director at Camp Logan. He enlisted in the United States Army in September 1918 and was assigned to Ellington Field. He was transferred to the infantry officers' training school Camp MacArthur, and then assigned to Fort Sill. He was discharged in December 1918. In 1919, he rejoined the YMCA and became the director of athletics for the Army of Occupation in Koblenz. He promoted boxing and wrestling matches, organized a series of international basketball contests between American and French army teams, and helped train the U.S. teams at the 1920 Summer Olympics.

== Return to the United States ==
Brannon returned to the United States in 1922 and served as the director of physical education at the Youngstown, Ohio YMCA. As a member of the Ohio National Guard, he oversaw the construction of athletic fields at Camp Perry. By 1925, he was the general secretary of the YMCA in Warren, Ohio. In 1929, he returned to higher education as public relations director at Magnolia A&M.

Brannon moved to Zanesville, Ohio, where he worked as an insurance agent. He was a candidate for the Ohio House of Representatives in 1936, but lost in the Republican primary to incumbent Ralph G. Marshall. On April 1, 1938, Brannon was appointed managing editor of the Sunday Times-Signal.

== World War II ==
In 1941, Bannon was named commander of the 3rd Battalion, 2nd Infantry regiment in the Ohio State Guard. The following year, he was appointed director of civilian defense for Zanesville and Muskingum County, Ohio. In June 1942, he was ordered to active duty and assigned to the office of the Ohio Adjutant General in Columbus, Ohio.

== Later life and death ==
In January 1945, Brannon was appointed reading clerk of the Ohio House of Representatives. That July, he returned to Zanesville to become acting editor of the Times Recorder. He left the paper in September to accept a position with WHIZ. In 1946, he was appointed publicity officer for the Ohio National Guard.

Brannon retired in 1949 due to ill health. He lived with his daughter for a while before moving to a nursing home in Columbus, where he died on December 1, 1952 from a suspected stroke.

== Head coaching record ==
Year	Team	Overall	Conference	Standing	Bowl/playoffs
Jonesboro Aggies (Independent) (1914–1917)
1914	Jonesboro Aggies	4–3			
1915	Jonesboro Aggies	4–1–1			
1916	Jonesboro Aggies	4–3			
1917	Jonesboro Aggies	4–2–1			
Jonesboro Aggies:		16–9–2			
Total:		16–9–2			
