= 1940 Northern Illinois State Huskies football team =

American college football season

1940 Northern Illinois State Huskies football
- Conference: Illinois Intercollegiate Athletic Conference
- Record: 6–3 (2–2 IIAC)
- Head coach: Chick Evans (12th season)
- Captain: Sam Smith
- Home stadium: Glidden Field

1940 Illinois Intercollegiate Athletic Conference football standings
	Conf.					Overall
Team	W		L		T	W		L		T
Illinois State Normal $	4	–	0	–	0	5	–	3	–	1
Carthage	2	–	0	–	0	5	–	2	–	1
Eastern Illinois	4	–	1	–	0	6	–	1	–	1
Northern Illinois State	2	–	2	–	0	6	–	3	–	0
Elmhurst	1	–	2	–	0	2	–	5	–	1
Western Illinois	0	–	3	–	1	1	–	6	–	1
Southern Illinois	0	–	3	–	1	2	–	5	–	1
Eureka	0	–	2	–	0	2	–	5	–	1

The 1940 Northern Illinois State Huskies football team represented Northern Illinois State Teachers College—now known as Northern Illinois University—as a member of the Illinois Intercollegiate Athletic Conference (IIAC) during the 1940 college football season. Led by 12th-year head coach Chick Evans, the Huskies compiled an overall record of 6–3 with a mark of 2–2 in conference play, placing fourth in the IIAC.

Northern Illinois was ranked at No. 353 (out of 697 college football teams) in the final rankings under the Litkenhous Difference by Score system for 1940.

The team played home games at the 5,500-seat Glidden Field, located on the east end of campus, in DeKalb, Illinois.

== Schedule ==
Date	Time	Opponent	Site	Result	Source
September 28		Whitewater State*	Glidden Field; DeKalb, IL	W 7–6	
October 5	1:00 p.m.	at Eastern Kentucky*	Hanger Stadium; Richmond, KY	L 0–35	
October 12		Central Michigan*	Glidden Field; DeKalb, IL	W 9–6	
October 19		at Oshkosh State*	Oshkosh, WI	W 21–7	
October 26		at Wheaton (IL)*	Wheaton, IL	W 12–6	
November 2		Southern Illinois	Glidden Field; DeKalb, IL	W 20–6	
November 9		at Illinois State Normal	McCormick Field; Normal, IL	L 14–26	
November 18		Eastern Illinois	Glidden Field; DeKalb, IL	L 0–12	
November 18		Western Illinois	Glidden Field; DeKalb, IL	W 32–13	
*Non-conference game; All times are in Central time
