= 1940 Arkansas State Indians football team =

American college football season

1940 Arkansas State Indians football
- Conference: Arkansas Intercollegiate Conference
- Record: 1–4–2 (0–0 AIC)
- Head coach: Bill Adams (2nd season)
- Home stadium: Kays Stadium

The 1940 Arkansas State Indians football team represented Arkansas State College—now known as Arkansas State University—as a member of the Arkansas Intercollegiate Conference (AIC) during the 1940 college football season. Led by second-year head coach Bill Adams, the Indians compiled an overall record of 1–4–2.

== Schedule ==
Date	Opponent	Site	Result	Source
September 20	Northwest Mississippi*	Kays Stadium; Jonesboro, AR	T 6–6	
September 29	at Missouri Mines*	Rolla, MO	L 12–44	
October 4	Sunflower Junior*	Kays Stadium; Jonesboro, AR	T 7–7	
October 13	at Southern Illinois*	McAndrew Stadium; Carbondale, IL	L 0–7	
October 26	Austin Peay*	Kays Stadium; Jonesboro, AR	W 13–0	
November 2	Union (TN)*	Kays Stadium; Jonesboro, AR	L 0–20	
November 8	at Tennessee Junior College*	Martin, TN	L 7–14	
*Non-conference game
