= 1939 Northern Illinois State Evansmen football team =

American college football season

1939 Northern Illinois State Evansmen football
- Conference: Illinois Intercollegiate Athletic Conference
- Record: 5–2–1 (3–1 IIAC)
- Head coach: Chick Evans (11th season)
- Captains: John Young; Paul Blair
- Home stadium: Glidden Field

1939 Illinois Intercollegiate Athletic Conference football standings
	Conf.					Overall
Team	W		L		T	W		L		T
Western Illinois $	3	–	0	–	1	5	–	1	–	1
Illinois State Normal	3	–	0	–	2	4	–	2	–	3
Northern Illinois State	3	–	1	–	0	5	–	2	–	1
Carthage	2	–	1	–	0	2	–	6	–	1
Eastern Illinois	2	–	2	–	1	4	–	3	–	1
Elmhurst	1	–	4	–	0	1	–	6	–	1
Eureka	0	–	2	–	0	0	–	7	–	0
Southern Illinois	0	–	4	–	0	0	–	8	–	0
$ – Conference champion

The 1939 Northern Illinois State Evansmen football team represented Northern Illinois State Teachers College—now known as Northern Illinois University—as a member of the Illinois Intercollegiate Athletic Conference (IIAC) during the 1939 college football season. Led by 11th-year head coach Chick Evans, the Evansmen compiled an overall record of 5–2–1 with a mark of 3–1 in conference play, placing third in the IIAC.

Northern Illinois was ranked at No. 293 (out of 609 teams) in the final Litkenhous Ratings for 1939.

The team played home games at the 5,500-seat Glidden Field, located on the east end of campus, in DeKalb, Illinois.

== Schedule ==
Date	Opponent	Site	Result
September 30	at Central Michigan*	Mount Pleasant, MI	L 0–6
October 7	at Elmhurst	Elmhurst, IL	W 13–0
October 14	Wheaton (IL)	Glidden Field; DeKalb, IL	W 19–7
October 21	Dubuque*	Glidden Field; DeKalb, IL	W 20–12
October 28	Milwaukee*	Glidden Field; DeKalb, IL	T 0–0
November 4	at Southern Illinois	McAndrew Stadium; Carbondale, IL	W 13–0
November 11	Illinois State	Glidden Field; DeKalb, IL	L 7–13
November 18	at Eastern Illinois	Charleston, IL	W 22–6
*Non-conference game
