= 1940 Southern Illinois Maroons football team =

American college football season

1940 Southern Illinois Maroons football
- Conference: Illinois Intercollegiate Athletic Conference
- Record: 2–5–1 (0–3–1 IIAC)
- Head coach: Glenn Martin (2nd season)
- Home stadium: McAndrew Stadium

1940 Illinois Intercollegiate Athletic Conference football standings
	Conf.					Overall
Team	W		L		T	W		L		T
Illinois State Normal $	4	–	0	–	0	5	–	3	–	1
Carthage	2	–	0	–	0	5	–	2	–	1
Eastern Illinois	4	–	1	–	0	6	–	1	–	1
Northern Illinois State	2	–	2	–	0	6	–	3	–	0
Elmhurst	1	–	2	–	0	2	–	5	–	1
Western Illinois	0	–	3	–	1	1	–	6	–	1
Southern Illinois	0	–	3	–	1	2	–	5	–	1
Eureka	0	–	2	–	0	2	–	5	–	1

The 1940 Southern Illinois Maroons football team was an American football team that represented Southern Illinois Normal University (now known as Southern Illinois University Carbondale) in the Illinois Intercollegiate Athletic Conference (IIAC) during the 1940 college football season. Under second-year head coach Glenn Martin, the team compiled a 2–5–1 record.

Southern Illinois was ranked at No. 473 (out of 697 college football teams) in the final rankings under the Litkenhous Difference by Score system for 1940.

The team played its home games at McAndrew Stadium in Carbondale, Illinois.

== Schedule ==
Date	Opponent	Site	Result	Source
September 28	at Evansville*	Evansville, IN	L 7–13	
October 5	Cape Girardeau*	McAndrew Stadium; Carbondale, IL	W 14–13	
October 13	Arkansas State*	McAndrew Stadium; Carbondale, IL	W 7–0	
October 19	at Western Illinois	Macomb, IL	T 6–6	
October 26	Illinois State Normal	McAndrew Stadium; Carbondale, IL	L 6–25	
November 2	at Northern Illinois State	Glidden Field; DeKalb, IL	L 6–20	
November 9	at Eastern Illinois	Charleston, IL	L 6–25	
November 21	at Cape Girardeau*	Houck Stadium; Cape Girardeau, MO	L 0–6	
*Non-conference game
