= Jonesboro Aggies football, 1911–1919 =

College football seasons

The Jonesboro Aggies football program from 1911 to 1919 represented the First District Agricultural School—now known as Arkansas State University—in its first decade of college football competition, competing as a junior college. The school did not field a team in 1918.

== 1911 ==
1911 Jonesboro Aggies football
- Conference: Independent
- Record: 1–1
- Head coach: F. T. Parks (1st season)
- Home stadium: League Park

The 1911 Jonesboro Aggies football team represented the First District Agricultural School—now known as Arkansas State University—as an independent during the 1911 college football season. Led by first-year head coach F. T. Parks, the Aggies compiled a record of 1–1. The team played one home game at League Park in Jonesboro, Arkansas.

=== Schedule ===
Date	Opponent	Site	Result	Source
November 24	at Paragould High School	Paragould, AR	L 6–11	
November 30	Paragould High School	League Park; Jonesboro, AR	W 6–0	

== 1912 ==
1912 Jonesboro Aggies football
- Conference: Independent
- Record: 3–1
- Head coach: F. T. Parks (2nd season)
- Home stadium: Agricultural school football grounds

The 1912 Jonesboro Aggies football team represented the First District Agricultural School—now known as Arkansas State University—as an independent during the 1912 college football season. Led by F. T. Parks in his second and final season as head coach, the Aggies compiled a record of 3–1.

=== Schedule ===
Date	Opponent	Site	Result	Source
September 21	at Paragould High School	Paragould, AR	W 7–0	
October 12	at Corning High School	Corning, AR	Cancelled	
October 26	Christian Brothers	Jonesboro, AR	L 6–20	
November 15	Corning High School	Jonesboro, AR	W 6–0 (forfeit?)	
November 28	Paragould High School	Agricultural school football grounds; Jonesboro, AR	W 20–0	

== 1913 ==
1913 Jonesboro Aggies football
- Conference: Independent
- Record: 5–2–1
- Head coach: Clint Young (1st season)

The 1913 Jonesboro Aggies football team represented the First District Agricultural School—now known as Arkansas State University—as an independent during the 1913 college football season. Led by Clint Young in his first and only season as head coach, the Aggies compiled a record of 5–2–1.

=== Schedule ===
Date	Time	Opponent	Site	Result	Source
October 1		at Arkansas College	Batesville, AR	W 12–0	
October 4		Corning High School	Jonesboro, AR	W 85–0	
October 11	3:00 p.m.	at Christian Brothers	Red Elm Park; Memphis, TN	T 0–0	
October 17		Arkansas College	Aggy football grounds; Jonesboro, AR	W 69–0	
October 25		Hendrix	Aggy campus; Jonesboro, AR	L 0–32	
November 1		Memphis University School	Jonesboro, AR	W 14–0	
November 14		at Central High School	Red Elm Park; Memphis, TN	L 0–7	
November 27		Memphis All-Stars	Jonesboro, AR	W 67–0	

== 1914 ==
1914 Jonesboro Aggies football
- Conference: Independent
- Record: 4–3
- Head coach: Earl W. Brannon (1st season)

The 1914 Jonesboro Aggies football team represented the First District Agricultural School—now known as Arkansas State University—as an independent during the 1914 college football season. Led by first-year head coach Earl W. Brannon, the Aggies compiled a record of 4–3.

=== Schedule ===
Date	Opponent	Site	Result	Source
September 26	Bolton College	Jonesboro, AR	W 6–0	
October 5	at Ole Miss	Oxford, MS	L 0–20	
October 14	at Henderson-Brown	Arkadelphia, AR	W 7–0	
October 24	at Ouachita Baptist	Arkadelphia, AR	L 0–62	
October 27	West Tennessee State Normal	Jonesboro, AR (rivalry)	W 18–6	
November 9	Arkansas College	Jonesboro, AR	W 6–0	
November 20	at Hendrix	Conway, AR	L 0–48	
November 26	Christian Brothers	Jonesboro, AR	W 48–0	
	Southwestern Presbyterian	Jonesboro, AR	L 6–20	

== 1915 ==
1915 Jonesboro Aggies football
- Conference: Independent
- Record: 4–1–1
- Head coach: Earl W. Brannon (2nd season)
- Home stadium: Kays Field

The 1915 Jonesboro Aggies football team represented the First District Agricultural School—now known as Arkansas State University—as an independent during the 1915 college football season. Led by second-year head coach Earl W. Brannon, the Aggies compiled a record of 4–1–1. The team played home games at Kays Field in Jonesboro, Arkansas.

=== Schedule ===
Date	Opponent	Site	Result	Attendance	Source
October 1	at Ole Miss	Hemingway Stadium; Oxford, MS	W 10–0		
October 8	West Tennessee State Normal	Kays Field; Jonesboro, AR (rivalry)	W 40–0	500	
October 15	Parrish College	Jonesboro, AR	W 26–0		
October 21	at Henderson-Brown	Arkadelphia, AR	T 0–0		
November 5	Ouachita Baptist	Kays Field; Jonesboro, AR	L 7–13		
November 19	at Arkansas College	Batesvills, AR	Cancelled		
November 25	Southern Illinois	Kays Field; Jonesboro, AR	W 16–0		

== 1916 ==
1916 Jonesboro Aggies football
- Conference: Independent
- Record: 4–3
- Head coach: Earl W. Brannon (3rd season)

The 1916 Jonesboro Aggies football team represented the First District Agricultural School—now known as Arkansas State University—as an independent during the 1916 college football season. Led by third-year head coach Earl W. Brannon, the Aggies compiled a record of 4–3. Brannon's wife, Cozette, was the varsity assistant and head coach of Jonesboro's second team, making her the only female football coach in the United States at that time.

=== Schedule ===
Date	Time	Opponent	Site	Result	Source
October 7		at Ole Miss	Hemingway Stadium; Oxford, MS	L 0–20	
October 13	3:00 p.m.	at Arkansas College	South Side Park; Batesville, AR	W 14–0	
October 20		Union (TN)	Jonesboro, AR	W 19–0	
October 28		at Arkansas State Normal	Conway, AR	L 0–19	
November 10		Arkansas College	Kays Field; Jonesboro, AR	W 6–0	
November 20		Ouachita Baptist	Jonesboro, AR	L 7–12	
November 30		West Tennessee State Normal	Jonesboro, AR (rivalry)	W 27–0	

== 1917 ==
1917 Jonesboro Aggies football
- Conference: Independent
- Record: 4–2–1
- Head coach: Earl W. Brannon (4th season)
- Home stadium: Kays Field

The 1917 Jonesboro Aggies football team represented the First District Agricultural School—now known as Arkansas State University—as an independent during the 1917 college football season. Led by Earl W. Brannon in is fourth and final season as head coach, the Aggies compiled a record of 4–2–1. The team played home games at Kays Field in Jonesboro, Arkansas.

=== Schedule ===
Date	Opponent	Site	Result	Attendance	Source
October 6	at Ole Miss	Hemingway Stadium; Oxford, MS	T 0–0		
October 12	Union (TN)	Kays Field; Jonesboro, AR	W 18–0		
October 19	West Tennessee State Normal	Kays Field; Jonesboro, AR (rivalry)	W 19–0		
October 26	at Cape Girardeau Normal	Fairgrounds Park; Cape Girardeau, MO	L 0–14		
November 2	Arkansas State Normal^{†}	Fairgrounds; Jonesboro, AR	W 101–0		
November 16	at Ouachita Baptist	Arkadelphia, AR	L 0–40		
November 29	Arkansas College	Jonesboro, AR	W 20–0		
^{†}Homecoming

== 1919 ==
1919 Jonesboro Aggies football
- Conference: Independent
- Record: 2–5
- Head coach: Foy Hammons (1st season)
- Home stadium: Kays Field

The 1919 Jonesboro Aggies football team represented the First District Agricultural School—now known as Arkansas State University—as an independent during the 1919 college football season. Led by first-year head coach Foy Hammons, the Aggies compiled a record of 2–5. The team played home games at Kays Field in Jonesboro, Arkansas.

=== Schedule ===
Date	Opponent	Site	Result	Source
October 4	at Ole Miss	Hemingway Stadium; Oxford, MS	L 0–26	
October 17	West Tennessee Normal	Kays Field; Jonesboro, AR	W 6–0	
October 24	at Arkansas State Normal	Normal Field; Conway, AR	L 0–8	
October 26	Camp Pike	Jonesboro, AR	L 7–16	
November 1	Ouachita Baptist	Kays Field; Jonesboro, AR	W 14–13	
November 21	at Russellville Aggies	Russellville, AR	L 0–14	
November 27	at Union (TN)	Jackon, TN	L 0–13	
