= 1938 Arkansas State Indians football team =

American college football season

1938 Arkansas State Indians football
- Conference: Arkansas Intercollegiate Conference
- Record: 3–3 (2–1 AIC)
- Head coach: Leslie Speck (3rd season)
- Home stadium: Kays Stadium

The 1938 Arkansas State Indians football team represented Arkansas State College—now known as Arkansas State University—as a member of the Arkansas Intercollegiate Conference (AIC) during the 1938 college football season. Led by third-year head coach Leslie Speck, the Indians compiled an overall record of 3–3 with a mark of 2–1 in conference play.

== Schedule ==
Date	Opponent	Site	Result	Source
October 1	West Tennessee State Teachers*	Kays Stadium; Jonesboro, AR (rivalry)	L 2–38	
October 7	at Tennessee Junior College*	Martin, TN	W 7–6	
October 15	at Southern Illinois*	McAndrew Stadium; Carbondale, IL	L 0–6	
October 22	Hendrix^{†}	Kays Stadium; Jonesboro, AR	L 0–6	
November 5	at Arkansas A&M	Monticello, AR	W 27–6	
November 11	Arkansas A&M	Kays Stadium; Jonesboro, AR	W 18–6	
*Non-conference game; ^{†}Homecoming
