= 1937 Arkansas State Indians football team =

American college football season

1937 Arkansas State Indians football
- Conference: Arkansas Intercollegiate Conference
- Record: 1–5 (0–3 AIC)
- Head coach: Leslie Speck (2nd season)
- Home stadium: Kays Stadium

The 1937 Arkansas State Indians football team represented Arkansas State College—now known as Arkansas State University—as a member of the Arkansas Intercollegiate Conference (AIC) during the 1937 college football season. Led by second-year head coach Leslie Speck, the Indians compiled an overall record of 1–5 with a mark of 0–3 in conference play.

== Schedule ==
Date	Opponent	Site	Result	Attendance	Source
September 18	at Southwestern (TN)*	Mid-South Fairgrounds; Memphis, TN	L 0–67	4,000	
October 4	Delta State*	Kays Stadium; Jonesboro, AR	L 0–28		
October 9	Tennessee Junior College*	Kays Stadium; Jonesboro, AR	W 16–7		
October 22	Hendrix	Kays Stadium; Jonesboro, AR	L 0–51		
October 29	at Arkansas A&M	Monticello, AR	L 0–19		
November 19	Arkansas State Teachers	Kays Stadium; Jonesboro, AR	L 0–95		
*Non-conference game
