= 1936 Northern Illinois State Evansmen football team =

American college football season

1936 Northern Illinois State Evansmen football
- Conference: Illinois Intercollegiate Athletic Conference
- Record: 4–3–1 (3–2–1 IIAC)
- Head coach: Chick Evans (8th season)
- Captains: William Walters; Karl Hein
- Home stadium: Glidden Field

1936 Illinois Intercollegiate Athletic Conference football standings
	Conf.					Overall
Team	W		L		T	W		L		T
Illinois Wesleyan +	5	–	0	–	1	5	–	3	–	1
St. Viator +	3	–	0	–	0	5	–	2	–	0
Bradley	6	–	2	–	0	6	–	3	–	0
North Central	3	–	1	–	1	4	–	2	–	1
Lake Forest	2	–	1	–	0	4	–	2	–	1
Wheaton (IL)	2	–	1	–	2	3	–	2	–	2
Southern Illinois	3	–	2	–	1	2	–	7	–	0
Western Illinois	3	–	2	–	1	3	–	2	–	2
Northern Illinois State	3	–	2	–	1	4	–	3	–	1
Illinois College	2	–	2	–	1	4	–	3	–	1
Monmouth (IL)	2	–	2	–	0	4	–	4	–	0
Augustana (IL)	3	–	3	–	0	3	–	5	–	0
Illinois State Normal	2	–	3	–	1	3	–	4	–	2
Millikin	2	–	4	–	0	3	–	5	–	0
Eastern Illinois	2	–	4	–	0	4	–	4	–	0
Knox (IL)	1	–	2	–	0	3	–	5	–	0
Eureka	2	–	5	–	1	2	–	5	–	1
Elmhurst	1	–	3	–	1	3	–	3	–	1
Carthage	1	–	4	–	1	2	–	5	–	1
Shurtleff	0	–	1	–	0	0	–	4	–	0
McKendree	0	–	4	–	0	2	–	6	–	0
+ – Conference co-champions

The 1936 Northern Illinois State Evansmen football team represented Northern Illinois State Teachers College—now known as Northern Illinois University—as a member of the Illinois Intercollegiate Athletic Conference (IIAC) during the 1936 college football season. Led by eighth-year head coach Chick Evans, the Evansmen compiled an overall record of 4–3–1 with a mark of 3–2–1 in conference play, tying for seventh place in the IIAC. The team played home games at the 5,500-seat Glidden Field, located on the east end of campus, in DeKalb, Illinois.

== Schedule ==
Date	Opponent	Site	Result
September 26	Whitewater State*	Glidden Field; DeKalb, IL	L 0–7
October 3	at Elmhurst	Glidden Field; DeKalb, IL	W 7–0
October 10	Southern Illinois	Glidden Field; DeKalb, IL	W 14-2
October 17	at Wheaton (IL)	Wheaton, IL	W 19–0
October 24	at Stevens Point*	Stevens Points, WI	W 28–0
October 31	Illinois State	Normal, IL	T 6–6
November 7	at Illinois Wesleyan	Glidden Field; DeKalb, IL	L 0–19
November 14	St. Viator	Kankakee, IL	L 0–13
*Non-conference game
