= David Gunn (American football) =

American athletic administrator, football coach, and player

Playing career
- 1982–1987: Arkansas
- Positions: Running back, defensive back

Coaching career (HC unless noted)
- 1990: Lake Highlands HS (TX) (RB)
- 1991–1995: Watson Chapel HS (AR) (RB/DB)
- 1996–2001: McClellan HS (AR)
- 2002–2011: Arkansas State (RB)
- 2011: Arkansas State (interim HC)
- 2012: Arkansas State (DB)

Administrative career (AD unless noted)
- 2013–2017: Auburn (asst AD for football)

Head coaching record
- Overall: 0–1 (college)
- Bowls: 0–1

David Gunn is an American former football player and coach and an athletic administrator. He most recently served as the assistant athletic director for football at Auburn University from 2013 to 2017. Gunn served as the interim head football coach at Arkansas State University for one game in 2011 after having served as an assistant coach since 2002 at that school. In January 2022, he was appointed head football coach at Paragould High School.

== Head coaching record ==
=== College ===
| Year | Team | Overall | Conference | Standing | Bowl/playoffs |
|---|---|---|---|---|---|
Arkansas State Red Wolves (Sun Belt Conference) (2011)
| 2011 | Arkansas State | 0–1 (Note: Hugh Freeze served as head coach for the regular season, leading Arkansas State to a 10–2 overall record and the Sun Belt Conference title with a mark of 8–0.) | | | L GoDaddy.com |
| Arkansas State: | | 0–1 | | | |
| Total: | | 0–1 | | | |
