= 1939 Arkansas State Indians football team =

American college football season

1939 Arkansas State Indians football
- Conference: Arkansas Intercollegiate Conference
- Record: 4–3 (0–1 AIC)
- Head coach: Bill Adams (1st season)
- Home stadium: Kays Stadium

The 1939 Arkansas State Indians football team represented Arkansas State College—now known as Arkansas State University—as a member of the Arkansas Intercollegiate Conference during the 1939 college football season. Led by first-year head coach Bill Adams, the Indians compiled an overall record of 4–3 with a mark of 0–1 in conference play.

== Schedule ==
| Date | Opponent | Site | Result | Source |
|---|---|---|---|---|
| September 23 | Northwest Mississippi* | Kays Stadium; Jonesboro, AR | W 13–0 | |
| September 29 | at West Tennessee State Teachers* | Crump Stadium; Memphis, TN (rivalry) | W 7–6 | |
| October 7 | at Missouri Mines* | Rolla, MO | L 6–39 | |
| October 14 | Southern Illinois*^{†} | Kays Stadium; Jonesboro, AR | W 7–0 | |
| October 19 | Hendrix | Kays Stadium; Jonesboro, AR | L 0–20 | |
| November 3 | at Union (TN)* | Jackson Stadium; Jackson, TN | L 6–20 | |
| November 11 | Tennessee Junior College* | Kays Stadium; Jonesboro, AR | W 26–13 | |
*Non-conference game; ^{†}Homecoming
