= 1938 Northern Illinois State Evansmen football team =

American college football season

1938 Northern Illinois State Evansmen football

IIAC champion
- Conference: Illinois Intercollegiate Athletic Conference
- Record: 6–1–1 (4–0 IIAC)
- Head coach: Chick Evans (10th season)
- Captain: Curtis Larsen
- Home stadium: Glidden Field

1938 Illinois Intercollegiate Athletic Conference football standings
	Conf.					Overall
Team	W		L		T	W		L		T
Northern Illinois State $	4	–	0	–	0	6	–	1	–	1
Carthage	3	–	0	–	0	6	–	1	–	1
Illinois State Normal	4	–	1	–	0	5	–	4	–	1
Western Illinois	2	–	2	–	0	4	–	3	–	1
Eastern Illinois	1	–	3	–	0	5	–	3	–	0
Elmhurst	1	–	3	–	0	2	–	5	–	0
Eureka	0	–	2	–	0	1	–	6	–	0
Southern Illinois	0	–	4	–	0	2	–	7	–	0

The 1938 Northern Illinois State Evansmen football team represented Northern Illinois State Teachers College—now known as Northern Illinois University—as a member of the Illinois Intercollegiate Athletic Conference (IIAC) during the 1938 college football season. Led by tenth-year head coach Chick Evans, the Evansmen compiled an overall record of 6–1–1 with a mark of 4–0 in conference play, winning the IIAC title. The team played home games at the 5,500-seat Glidden Field, located on the east end of campus, in DeKalb, Illinois.

== Schedule ==
Date	Opponent	Site	Result	Source
October 1	Eastern Illinois	Glidden Field; DeKalb, IL	W 7–0	
October 8	Southern Illinois	Glidden Field; DeKalb, IL	W 26–0	
October 15	at Wheaton (IL)*	Wheaton, IL	W 18–7	
October 22	at Dubuque*	Dubuque, IA	T 6–6	
October 29	Mankato State*	Glidden Field; DeKalb, IL	W 28–6	
November 4	Elmhurst	Glidden Field; DeKalb, IL	W 39–0	
November 12	at Illinois State	Normal, IL	W 2–0	
November 24	at Northeast Center*	Brown Field; Monroe, LA	L 7–15	
*Non-conference game
