= Clint Young (American football) =

American football coach

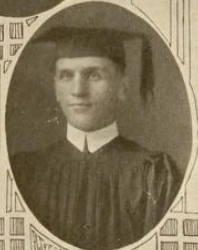

Biographical details
- Born: November 12, 1890; Gadsden, Tennessee, U.S.
- Died: December 2, 1978 (aged 88); Belleville, Illinois, U.S.

Playing career

Football
- 1910–1911: Arkansas

Basketball
- c. 1910: Arkansas

Baseball
- 1910–1911: Arkansas
- Position: Fullback (football)

Coaching career (HC unless noted)

Football
- 1913: Jonesboro Aggies
- 1915–1916: Jonesboro HS (AR)
- 1922: Jonesboro HS (AR)

Head coaching record
- Overall: 5–2–1 (college)

William Turner Clint Young (November 12, 1890 – December 2, 1978) was an American college football player and coach. He served as the head football coach at the First District Agricultural School of Jonesboro, Arkansas—now known as Arkansas State University—in 1913, compiling a record of 5–2–1.

Young graduated from Jonesboro High School, and then played football, basketball, and baseball for the University of Arkansas. He was a fullback on the football team.

Young took over as head football coach at Jonesboro after E. E. Tarr left due to his sister's illness. In 1915, Young was hired as the head football coach for his alma mater, Jonesboro High School. He returned as head coach in 1922.

After his coaching career, Young operated Young Motor Co., in East St. Louis, Illinois. In 1937, 20 cars were destroyed costing around $7,000 after faulty wiring caused a fire in the building he owned. In 1938, Young married Hazel Lane in Chicago. Young also owned the Young Lumber Company in East St. Louis. He died on December 2, 1978, at the Castle Haven Nursing Home in Belleville, Illinois.

== Head coaching record ==
=== College ===
| Year | Team | Overall | Conference | Standing | Bowl/playoffs |
|---|---|---|---|---|---|
Jonesboro Aggies (Independent) (1913)
| 1913 | Jonesboro Aggies | 5–2–1 | | | |
| Jonesboro Aggies: | | 5–2–1 | | | |
| Total: | | 5–2–1 | | | |
