= Ike Tomlinson =

American athletics coach and college administrator (1910–2000)

Biographical details
- Born: November 17, 1910
- Died: March 9, 2000 (aged 89); Jonesboro, Arkansas, U.S.

Coaching career (HC unless noted)

Football
- 1945: Arkansas State

Basketball
- 1944–1949: Arkansas State

Baseball
- 1947–1976: Arkansas State

Administrative career (AD unless noted)
- 1945–1969: Arkansas State

Head coaching record
- Overall: 2–4–1 (football); 51–69 (basketball); 363–423–7 (baseball)

James A. "Ike" Tomlinson (November 17, 1910 – March 9, 2000) was an American football, basketball, and baseball coach and college athletics administrator. He served as the head baseball coach at Arkansas State University from 1947 to 1976, compiling a record of 363–423–7 and becoming the longest-tenured athletic coach at the school. The school's baseball facility, Tomlinson Stadium–Kell Field, is named after him. Tomlinson was also the head football coach at Arkansas State for season in 1945, tallying a mark of 2–4–1, and school's head basketball coach from 1944 to 1949, amassing a record of 51–69.

== Head coaching record ==
=== Football ===
Year	Team	Overall	Conference	Standing	Bowl/playoffs
Arkansas State Indians (Arkansas Intercollegiate Conference) (1945)
1945	Arkansas State	2–4–1			
Arkansas State:		2–4–1			
Total:		2–4–1			
