= Burnt Prairie, Illinois =

Burnt Prairie
- Village
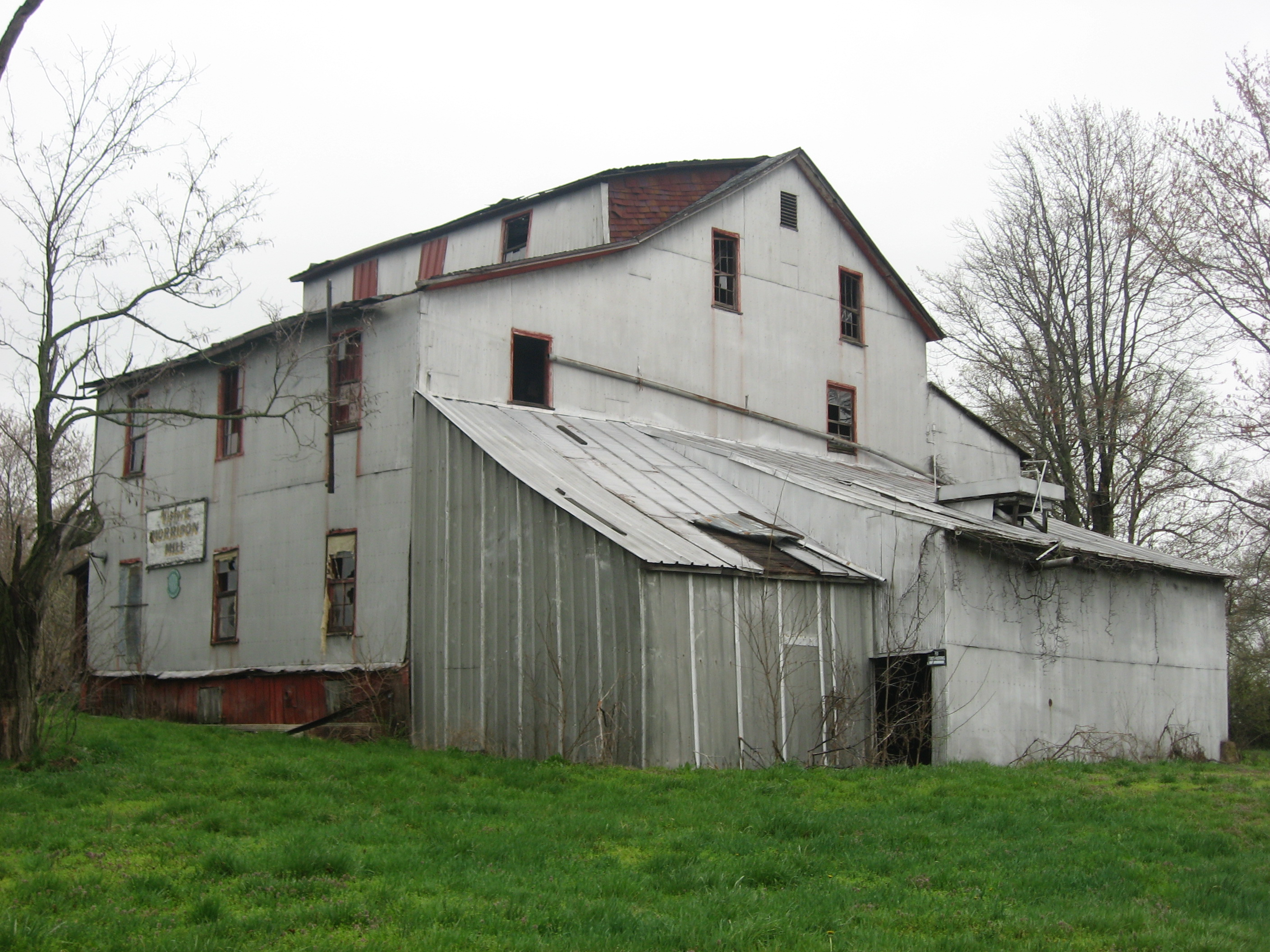
- The Old Morrison Mill, a local historic site

- Location of Burnt Prairie in White County, Illinois.
- Coordinates: 38°15′05″N 88°15′28″W
- Country: United States
- State: Illinois
- County: White

Area
  - Total: 0.077 sq mi (0.20 km^{2})
  - Land: 0.077 sq mi (0.20 km^{2})
  - Water: 0 sq mi (0.00 km^{2})
- Elevation: 459 ft (140 m)

Population (2020)
  - Total: 36
  - Density: 474.5/sq mi (183.22/km^{2})
- Time zone: UTC-6 (CST)
  - Summer (DST): UTC-5 (CDT)
- Zip code: 62820
- Area code: 618
- FIPS code: 17-09889
- GNIS ID: 2397503

Burnt Prairie (formerly known as Liberty) is a village in White County, Illinois, United States. As of the 2020 census, Burnt Prairie had a population of 36.

== Geography ==
Burnt Prairie is located adjacent to the northern border of the county.

According to the 2010 census, Burnt Prairie has a total area of 0.08 square miles (0.21 km^{2}), all land.

== Demographics ==
Historical population
Census	Pop.	Note	%±
1930	181		—
1940	202		11.6%
1950	172		−14.9%
1960	118		−31.4%
1970	134		13.6%
1980	114		−14.9%
1990	71		−37.7%
2000	58		−18.3%
2010	52		−10.3%
2020	36		−30.8%
U.S. Decennial Census

As of the census of 2000, there were 58 people, 31 households, and 15 families residing in the village. The population density was 728.3 inhabitants per square mile (281.2/km^{2}). There were 43 housing units at an average density of 539.9 per square mile (208.5/km^{2}). The racial makeup of the village was 100.00% White. Hispanic or Latino of any race were 1.72% of the population.

There were 31 households, out of which 16.1% had children under the age of 18 living with them, 45.2% were married couples living together, 3.2% had a female householder with no husband present, and 48.4% were non-families. 41.9% of all households were made up of individuals, and 32.3% had someone living alone who was 65 years of age or older. The average household size was 1.87 and the average family size was 2.50.

In the village, the population was spread out, with 12.1% under the age of 18, 12.1% from 18 to 24, 20.7% from 25 to 44, 29.3% from 45 to 64, and 25.9% who were 65 years of age or older. The median age was 53 years. For every 100 females, there were 87.1 males. For every 100 females age 18 and over, there were 88.9 males.

The median income for a household in the village was $18,125, and the median income for a family was $23,750. Males had a median income of $33,750 versus $23,750 for females. The per capita income for the village was $14,572. There were 18.2% of families and 28.3% of the population living below the poverty line, including no under eighteens and 33.3% of those over 64.
