= Bill Davidson (American football, born 1935) =

American football player, coach, and administrator (1935–1999)

Biographical details
- Born: January 21, 1935
- Died: May 2, 1999 (aged 64); Stuttgart, Arkansas, U.S.

Playing career
- 1954–1956: Arkansas State
- Positions: Center, linebacker

Coaching career (HC unless noted)
- 1957–1959: Earle HS (AR)
- 1960–1962: Jonesboro HS (AR)
- 1963–1970: Arkansas State (OC/OL)
- 1971–1978: Arkansas State

Head coaching record
- Overall: 51–32–1 (college); 56–12–1 (high school)

Accomplishments and honors

Championships
- 2 Southland (1975, 1978)

Bill "Bull" Davidson (January 21, 1935 – May 2, 1999) was an American football player and coach and college athletics administrator. He served as the head football coach at Arkansas State University from 1971 to 1978, compiling a record of 51–32–1. Davidson coached his 1975 team to a perfect season during its first year at the NCAA Division I level and was later inducted into the Arkansas Sports Hall of Fame.

== Playing career ==
Davidson attended high school at Manila, Arkansas where he played baseball and basketball since Manila did not have a football team at the time. In 1953, he enrolled at Arkansas State and went out for the football team. During his career as a player, he lettered three times as a center and linebacker.

== Coaching career ==
After graduating from college, Davidson coached high school football and earned a 28–7 record at Earle, Arkansas from 1957 to 1959 and a 28–5–1 record at Jonesboro High School from 1960 to 1962. He took the offensive coordinator and offensive line coach positions at Arkansas State in 1963.

Davidson amassed a 51–32–1 record as head coach of the Arkansas State Indians, now the Red Wolves, football team from 1971 to 1978. This record included a perfect 11–0 season in 1975. Davidson also participated in an 11–0 perfect season as an assistant coach in 1970, with the team earning the NCAA College Division national championship. When head coach Bennie Ellender headed to his alma mater Tulane, Davidson was elevated to the head coaching job. ASU's record with Davidson as an assistant coach from 1963 to 1970 was 52–20–4. Davidson coached 11 All-Americans during his tenure.

During Davidson's tenure, ASU gained a reputation as a physically tough and intimidating team. In 1975, ASU moved to NCAA Division I and dominated all eleven teams they faced that year by a combined score of 355–81. Davidson's team trailed only twice after half-time the entire year and never in the fourth quarter. ASU led the nation in rushing that year at 340.5 yards per game and ranked in the national top ten in seven defensive categories. Davidson's team took 13 of 22 slots on the Southland Conference's all conference team. Nearly 20 of Davidson's players from the 1975 perfect team were signed by NFL teams. Davidson earned the Southland Conference Coach of the Year that year and the team established the nation's longest winning streak (15 games) at the time. The 1975 season was almost unimaginable for a small college in its first year at the Division I level.

== Administrative career ==
Davidson retired as Arkansas State head coach in 1978 due to health problems. Davidson earned the Southland Conference Coach of the Year trophy again in his last year. Davidson returned to work in the 1980s when he served as an associate athletic director for the school.

Adapted from the article Bill Davidson, from Wikinfo, licensed under the GNU Free Documentation License.

== Head coaching record ==
=== College ===
Year	Team	Overall	Conference	Standing	Bowl/playoffs
Arkansas State Indians (Southland Conference) (1971–1978)
1971	Arkansas State	4–4–1	1–3–1	5th	
1972	Arkansas State	3–8	1–4	T–5th	
1973	Arkansas State	7–3	3–2	T–2nd	
1974	Arkansas State	7–3	3–2	3rd	
1975	Arkansas State	11–0	5–0	1st	
1976	Arkansas State	5–6	2–3	T–4th	
1977	Arkansas State	7–4	2–3	4th	
1978	Arkansas State	7–4	4–1	T–1st	
Arkansas State:		51–32–1	21–18–1		
Total:		51–32–1			
National championship Conference title Conference division title or championship game berth
