= F. T. Parks =

American college sports athlete and coach (1890–1959)

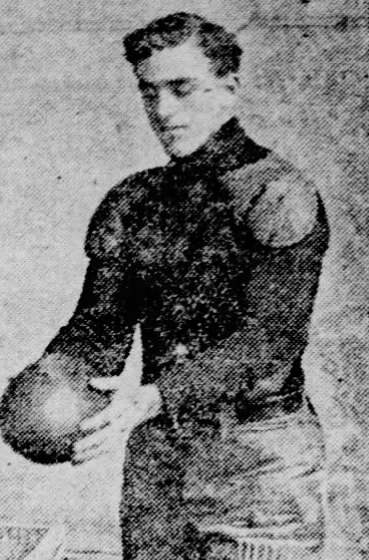

Biographical details
- Born: May 18, 1890; Bellaire, Kansas, U.S.
- Died: October 29, 1959 (aged 69); Denver, Colorado, U.S.

Playing career

Football
- 1910: Kansas State

Basketball
- 1910–1911: Kansas State

Baseball
- 1910–1911: Kansas State

Track and field
- 1910–1911: Kansas State
- Positions: Fullback (football); Forward (basketball); Center fielder (baseball)

Coaching career (HC unless noted)

Football
- 1911–1912: Jonesboro Aggies

Basketball
- 1911–1913: Jonesboro Aggies

Baseball
- 1912–1913: Jonesboro Aggies

Administrative career (AD unless noted)
- c. 1912: Jonesboro Aggies

Head coaching record
- Overall: 4–2 (football)

Frank Thomas Parks (May 18, 1890 – October 29, 1959) was an American college football, college basketball, and college baseball player and coach. He served as the head football coach at the First District Agricultural and Mechanical College of Jonesboro, Arkansas—now known as Arkansas State University—from 1911 to 1912, compiling a record of 4–2. Parks was also the head basketball coach at First District A&M from 1911 to 1913 and the school's head baseball coach from 1912 to 1913. During his team with First District A&M, he also served as the school's athletic director.

Parks played football, basketball, baseball, and ran track for Kansas State Agricultural College—now known as Kansas State University.

Parks also taught engineering with First District A&M. After two-and-a-half years with the Aggies, Parks left coaching and returned to Kansas. He later worked in the oil industry with the Empire Gas and Fuel Company in Bartlesville, Oklahoma.

Parks married Minnie L. Forceman in 1911, and together they had two children. He died on October 29, 1959 of a heart attack in Denver.

== Football head coaching record ==
Year	Team	Overall	Conference	Standing	Bowl/playoffs
Jonesboro Aggies (Independent) (1911–1912)
1911	Jonesboro Aggies	1–1			
1912	Jonesboro Aggies	3–1			
Jonesboro Aggies:		4–2			
Total:		4–2			
