= Leslie Speck =

American athlete and coach (1913–2004)

Biographical details
- Born: November 12, 1913; Frenchmans Bayou, Arkansas, U.S.
- Died: August 17, 2004 (aged 90); Blytheville, Arkansas, U.S.

Playing career

Football
- 1931–1934: Arkansas State

Basketball
- 1932–1935: Arkansas State

Track and field
- 1932–1935: Arkansas State
- Positions: Quarterback (football); Forward (basketball)

Coaching career (HC unless noted)

Football
- 1935: Hoxie HS (AR)
- 1936–1938: Arkansas State
- 1940–1941: Osceola HS (AR)
- 1950–1951: Osceola HS (AR)

Track and field
- 1936–1939: Arkansas State

Head coaching record
- Overall: 7–13 (college football)

Leslie Norman "Dukie" Speck (November 12, 1913 – August 14, 2004) was an American college football and college basketball player and coach of football. He served as the head football coach at Arkansas State College—now known as Arkansas State University—from 1936 to 1938, compiling a record of 7–13.

Speck played college football, basketball, and participated in track and field at Arkansas State. He was a quarterback for the football team and a forward for the basketball team.

After Speck's graduation he served the head football coach for Hoxie High School. After one season, he returned to his alma mater, Arkansas State, as the school's head football coach. He resigned after three seasons to become the project director for the National Youth Administration in Camden, Arkansas.

Speck would return to coaching after a year as the head football coach for Osceola High School. He left his post in 1941 to join the United States Navy. After returning from the service he opted not to return to coaching, instead, operating his own electrical appliance business in Osceola, Arkansas. He came out of retirement from coaching in 1950 to return as the head football coach for Osceola High School.

== Head coaching record ==
=== College football ===
Year	Team	Overall	Conference	Standing	Bowl/playoffs
Arkansas State Indians (Arkansas Intercollegiate Conference) (1936–1938)
1936	Arkansas State	3–5			
1937	Arkansas State	1–5			
1938	Arkansas State	3–3			
Arkansas State:		7–13			
Total:		7–13			
