= Larry Lacewell =

American football player, coach, scout and athletic director (1937–2022)

Biographical details
- Born: February 12, 1937; Fordyce, Arkansas, U.S.
- Died: May 18, 2022 (aged 85)

Playing career
- 1955–1958: Arkansas A&M
- Position: Halfback

Coaching career (HC unless noted)
- 1959: Alabama (GA)
- 1960–1961: Arkansas State (assistant)
- 1965: Kilgore (assistant)
- 1966: Oklahoma (freshmen)
- 1967: Wichita State (assistant)
- 1968: Iowa State (DC/E/LB)
- 1969: Oklahoma (DE)
- 1970–1972: Oklahoma (DC)
- 1973–1977: Oklahoma (AHC/DC)
- 1978: Arkansas State (volunteer)
- 1979–1989: Arkansas State
- 1990–1991: Tennessee (DC)

Administrative career (AD unless noted)
- 1979–1990: Arkansas State
- 1992–2004: Dallas Cowboys (director of scouting)

Head coaching record
- Overall: 69–58–4
- Tournaments: 6–4 (NCAA D-I-AA playoffs)

Accomplishments and honors

Championships
- 2 Southland champion (1985–1986)

Larry Lacewell (February 12, 1937 – May 18, 2022) was an American football player, coach, scout, and college athletics administrator He served as the head football coach at Arkansas State University from 1979 to 1989, compiling a record of 69–58–4. Lacewell was later the longtime director of scouting for the Dallas Cowboys of the National Football League (NFL).

== Early years ==
Lacewell was a native of Fordyce, Arkansas. He attended Fordyce High School, where he played halfback. He accepted a football scholarship from Arkansas A&M College. As a junior, he was named second-team All-AIC at running back.

== Professional career ==
Lacewell began his coaching career as a graduate assistant for Bear Bryant at the University of Alabama. He then moved on to coach at Arkansas State (1961), Arkansas A&M (1962-1963), Kilgore Junior College (1964-1965, winning the NJCAA National Football Championship), Oklahoma (1966), Wichita State (1967) and Iowa State (1968), before becoming defensive coordinator at Oklahoma in 1969. Lacewell became assistant head coach under Barry Switzer in 1973, and the teams won six Big Eight titles and two national championships in the ensuing years.

As the athletic director and head coach at Arkansas State University from 1978 to 1989. He compiled a record of 69-48-4, while capturing two Southland Conference titles and being named the conference's Coach of the Year on three occasions. He also led the program to four consecutive appearances in the NCAA Division I-AA playoffs, with the 1986 team making it all the way to the championship game before losing to Georgia Southern. He left as the winningest coach in school history.

In 1990, he became the defensive coordinator for the Tennessee Volunteers under Johnny Majors. He contributed to the program winning the SEC Championship and defeating the University of Virginia in the Sugar Bowl. In 1991, the team finished second in the SEC and received a Fiesta Bowl invitation.

On May 21, 1992, he joined the Dallas Cowboys as the Director of College Scouting, replacing Dick Mansperger. In the Spring of 1994, he was named the Director of College and Pro Scouting, adding the responsibility of coordinating the scouting efforts of all pro personnel.

After head coach Jimmy Johnson left the franchise on March 28, 1994, the subsequent drafts made by the Cowboys came under heavy scrutiny in the media and with the fans, as they were never able to replenish the talent base and holdovers of the Super Bowl teams of the early 1990s. In January 2005, two seasons after the arrival of head coach Bill Parcells, he retired and moved into a talent consultant role, while being replaced by Jeff Ireland, who was promoted to Vice President of Pro and College Scouting.

== Personal life ==
In 1987, he was inducted into the Arkansas State Athletics Hall of Honor. In 1996, he was inducted into the Arkansas Sports Hall of Fame. In 2003, he was inducted into the University of Arkansas at Monticello Sports Hall of Fame.

Lacewell resided in Jonesboro, Arkansas, with his wife, Criss. He died on May 18, 2022.

== Head coaching record ==
Year	Team	Overall	Conference	Standing	Bowl/playoffs	NCAA^{#}
Arkansas State Indians (Southland Conference) (1979–1986)
1979	Arkansas State	4–7	1–4	T–4th		
1980	Arkansas State	2–9	0–5	6th		
1981	Arkansas State	6–5	3–2	3rd		
1982	Arkansas State	5–6	2–3	T–3rd		
1983	Arkansas State	5–5–1	3–3	T–3rd		
1984	Arkansas State	8–4–1	4–1–1	2nd	L NCAA Division I-AA Second Round	10
1985	Arkansas State	9–4	5–1	1st	L NCAA Division I-AA Second Round	6
1986	Arkansas State	12–2–1	5–0	1st	L NCAA Division I-AA Championship	2
Arkansas State Indians (NCAA Division I-AA independent) (1987–1989)
1987	Arkansas State	8–4–1			L NCAA Division I-AA Second Round	12
1988	Arkansas State	5–6				
1989	Arkansas State	5–6				
Arkansas State:		69–58–4	22–19–1			
Total:		69–58–4				
National championship Conference title Conference division title or championship game berth
^{#}NCAA Division I-AA Football Committee poll.
