= Belvidere, Nebraska =

Village in Thayer County, Nebraska, United States

- Village
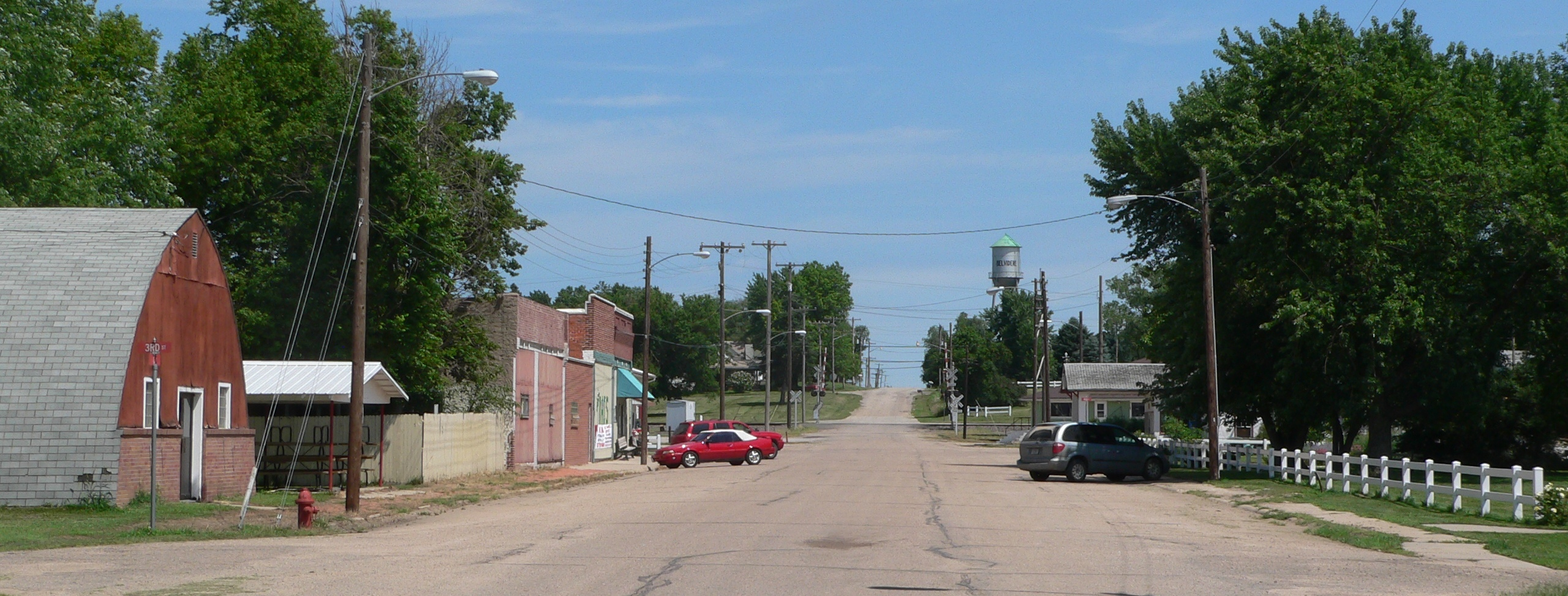
- Downtown Belvidere: C Street, looking north, July 2010

- Location of Belvidere, Nebraska
- Coordinates: 40°15′17″N 97°33′27″W
- Country: United States
- State: Nebraska
- County: Thayer

Area
  - Total: 0.47 sq mi (1.21 km^{2})
  - Land: 0.47 sq mi (1.21 km^{2})
  - Water: 0 sq mi (0.00 km^{2})
- Elevation: 1,516 ft (462 m)

Population (2020)
  - Total: 51
  - Estimate (2021): 50
  - Density: 110/sq mi (42.3/km^{2})
- Time zone: UTC-6 (Central (CST))
  - Summer (DST): UTC-5 (CDT)
- ZIP code: 68315
- Area code: 402
- FIPS code: 31-04160
- GNIS feature ID: 2398091

Belvidere is a village in Thayer County, Nebraska, United States. The population was 51 at the 2020 census.

== History ==
Belvidere started in 1872 with the construction of the railroad through the territory. The settlement was named by an official of the Saint Joseph and Grand Island Railroad, in keeping with the railroad's practice of naming stations in alphabetical order. The name may have been taken from Belvidere, Illinois or from Belvidere, New Jersey.

== Geography ==
According to the United States Census Bureau, the village has a total area of 0.48 square miles (1.24 km^{2}), all land.

== Demographics ==
Historical population
Census	Pop.	Note	%±
1880	264		—
1890	359		36.0%
1900	458		27.6%
1910	475		3.7%
1920	424		−10.7%
1930	358		−15.6%
1940	325		−9.2%
1950	274		−15.7%
1960	185		−32.5%
1970	162		−12.4%
1980	158		−2.5%
1990	117		−25.9%
2000	98		−16.2%
2010	48		−51.0%
2020	51		6.3%
2021 (est.)	50	▼	−2.0%
U.S. Decennial Census

=== 2010 census ===
At the census of 2010, there were 48 people, 24 households and 10 families residing in the village. The population density was 100.0 inhabitants per square mile (38.6/km^{2}). There were 32 housing units at an average density of 66.7 per square mile (25.8/km^{2}). The racial makeup of the village was 95.8% White and 4.2% from two or more races. Hispanic or Latino of any race were 2.1% of the population.

There were 24 households, of which 16.7% had children under the age of 18 living with them, 33.3% were married couples living together, 4.2% had a female householder with no husband present, 4.2% had a male householder with no wife present, and 58.3% were non-families. 54.2% of all households were made up of individuals, and 20.8% had someone living alone who was 65 years of age or older. The average household size was 2.00 and the average family size was 2.80.

The median age was 47.5 years. 22.9% of residents were under the age of 18; 8.4% were between the ages of 18 and 24; 18.8% were from 25 to 44; 33.4% were from 45 to 64; and 16.7% were 65 years of age or older. The gender make-up was 54.2% male and 45.8% female.

=== 2000 census ===
At the 2000 census, there were 98 people, 40 households and 21 families residing in the village. The population density was 204.1 inhabitants per square mile (78.8/km^{2}). There were 43 housing units at an average density of 89.6 per square mile (34.6/km^{2}). The racial makeup of the village was 100.00% White.

There were 40 households, of which 30.0% had children under the age of 18 living with them, 45.0% were married couples living together, 7.5% had a female householder with no husband present, and 47.5% were non-families. 42.5% of all households were made up of individuals, and 17.5% had someone living alone who was 65 years of age or older. The average household size was 2.45 and the average family size was 3.62.

The median age was 40 years. 30.6% of the population were under the age of 18, 6.1% from 18 to 24, 22.4% from 25 to 44, 29.6% from 45 to 64, and 11.2% who were 65 years of age or older. For every 100 females, there were 75.0 males. For every 100 females age 18 and over, there were 78.9 males.

The median household income was $26,250 and the median family income was $48,750. Males had a median income of $19,583 and females $17,500. The per capita income was $20,278. There were no families and 7.2% of the population living below the poverty line, including no under eighteens and 18.2% of those over 64.

== See also ==
- List of municipalities in Nebraska
