= Foy Hammons =

American football player and coach (1894–1961)

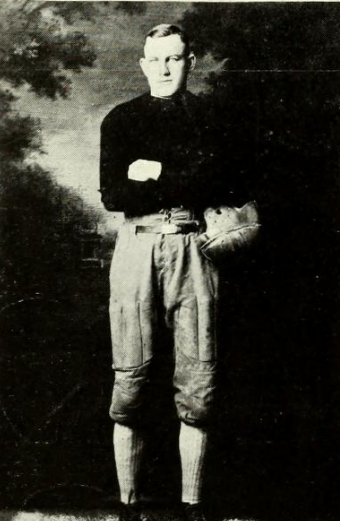

Biographical details
- Born: January 22, 1894; Little Rock, Arkansas, U.S.
- Died: July 16, 1961 (aged 67); Little Rock, Arkansas, U.S.

Playing career
- 1913–1915: Jonesboro Aggies
- 1919: Jonesboro Aggies

Coaching career (HC unless noted)
- 1919–1920: Jonesboro Aggies
- 1926–1930: Ouachita Baptist
- 1931–1933: Arkansas A&M

Head coaching record
- Overall: 41–30–12 (college)

Foy Hayden Hammons (January 22, 1894 – July 16, 1961) was an American college football player and coach. He served as the head football coach at the First District Agricultural School of Jonesboro, Arkansas (now known as Arkansas State University) from 1919 to 1920, at Ouachita Baptist University from 1926 to 1930, and at Arkansas Agricultural and Mechanical College (now known as the University of Arkansas at Monticello) from 1931 to 1933, compiling a career college head coaching football record of 41–30–12.

Hammons also coached high school football at Pine Bluff High School and Hope High School in Arkansas. He died in 1961 after a long illness.

== Head coaching record ==
=== College ===
Year	Team	Overall	Conference	Standing	Bowl/playoffs
Jonesboro Aggies (Independent) (1919–1920)
1919	Jonesboro Aggies	2–5			
1920	Jonesboro Aggies	3–3			
Jonesboro Aggies:		5–8			
Ouachita Baptist Tigers (Independent) (1926)
1926	Ouachita Baptist	6–0–1			
Ouachita Baptist Tigers (Arkansas Association) (1927)
1927	Ouachita Baptist	6–1–2			
Ouachita Baptist Tigers (Independent) (1928–1930)
1928	Ouachita Baptist	5–3–1			
1929	Ouachita Baptist	3–5–2			
1930	Ouachita Baptist	5–3–1			
Ouachita Baptist:		25–12–7			
Arkansas A&M Boll Weevils (Arkansas Intercollegiate Conference) (1931–1933)
1931	Arkansas A&M	7–2–1			
1932	Arkansas A&M	2–5–2			
1933	Arkansas A&M	2–3–2			
Arkansas A&M:		11–10–5			
Total:		41–30–12			
