= Bill Adams (American football coach) =

American football player and coach

Playing career
- 1935–1936: Arkansas State
- Position: Quarterback

Coaching career (HC unless noted)
- 1938: Walnut Ridge HS (AR) (assistant)
- 1939–1941: Arkansas State

Head coaching record
- Overall: 5–14–2

Bill Adams was an American football coach. He served as the head football coach at Arkansas State College—now known as Arkansas State University—from 1939 to 1941, compiling a record of 5–14–2. Adams attended Arkansas State, where he played college football as a quarterback from 1935 to 1936. He was an assistant football coach at Walnut Ridge High School in Walnut Ridge, Arkansas prior to be hired as the head football coach at his alma mater in May 1939.

== Head coaching record ==
Year	Team	Overall	Conference	Standing	Bowl/playoffs
Arkansas State Indians (Arkansas Intercollegiate Conference) (1939–1941)
1939	Arkansas State	4–3			
1940	Arkansas State	1–4–2			
1941	Arkansas State	0–7			
Arkansas State:		5–14–2			
Total:		5–14–2			
