= 2012 GoDaddy.com Bowl =

Arkansas State Red Wolves	Northern Illinois Huskies
(10–2)	(10–3)
Sun Belt	MAC
20	38
Head coach: David Gunn (interim)	Head coach: Dave Doeren
	1	2	3	4	Total
Arkansas State	13	0	0	7	20
Northern Illinois	7	14	7	10	38
- Date: January 8, 2012
- Season: 2011
- Stadium: Ladd–Peebles Stadium
- Location: Mobile, Alabama
- MVP: QB Chandler Harnish, NIU
- Favorite: Arkansas State by 1
- Referee: Tom McCreesh (ACC)
- Attendance: 38,734
- Payout: US$750,000

United States TV coverage
- Network: ESPN
- Announcers: Clay Matvick (play-by-play); Danny Kanell (analyst); Cara Capuano (sidelines)
- Nielsen ratings: 1.24

The 2012 GoDaddy.com Bowl the thirteenth edition of the GoDaddy.com Bowl, an American college football bowl game. Part of the 2011 NCAA Division I FBS football season, and one of the 2011–12 NCAA football bowl games, it took place on January 8, 2012, at Ladd–Peebles Stadium in Mobile, Alabama. The Northern Illinois Huskies from the Mid-American Conference (MAC) defeated the Arkansas State Red Wolves from the Sun Belt Conference, 38–20.

The first quarter saw the Red Wolves build up a 13–0 lead, but then the Huskies scored 31 unanswered points to put the game away in the second half.

== Teams ==
=== Arkansas State ===
ASU completed its best regular season since 1975 by winning 10 games and extending its overall winning streak to 9 games. The Red Wolves were led by junior quarterback Ryan Aplin (605 rushing yds., 9 TDs, 3,235 passing yards) who was the Sun Belt Conference Player of the Year and senior defensive lineman Brandon Joiner, the Defensive Player of the Year.

=== Northern Illinois ===
Northern Illinois defeated Ohio, 23-20, in the 2011 Marathon MAC Championship game at Ford Field in Detroit, MI, which was led offensively by QB Chandler Harnish (1,382 rushing yds., 11 TDs; 2,942 passing yards, 26 TDs), WR Nathan Palmer (683 receiving yds., 7 TDs); and defensively by LB Pat Schiller (108 tackles), DE Sean Progar (5.5 sacks), and DB Rashaan Melvin (2 INT).
