= Arkansas State Red Wolves football =

Football team representing Arkansas State University

2026 Arkansas State Red Wolves football team
- First season: 1911; 115 years ago
- Athletic director: Chris Pezman
- Head coach: Jalen Ortiz (interim)
- Location: Jonesboro, Arkansas
- Stadium: Centennial Bank Stadium (capacity: 30,406)
- NCAA division: Division I FBS
- Conference: Sun Belt
- Division: West
- Colors: Scarlet and black
- All-time record: 511–536–37 (.488)
- Bowl record: 6–7 (.462)

Small college national championships
- 1970

Conference championships
- Southland: 1968, 1969, 1970, 1975, 1978, 1985, 1986 SBC: 2011, 2012, 2013, 2015, 2016
- Rivalries: Memphis (rivalry)
- Fight song: ASU Loyalty
- Mascot: Howl
- Marching band: Sound of the Natural State
- Website: AStateRedWolves.com

The Arkansas State Red Wolves football team represents Arkansas State University in National Collegiate Athletic Association (NCAA) Division I Football Bowl Subdivision (FBS) college football competition. The team was founded in 1911 and has competed as a member of the Sun Belt Conference since 2001. Their home field is Centennial Bank Stadium and the head coach is Butch Jones.

The Red Wolves have claimed 12 conference championships. Arkansas State's most recent conference championship came in 2016. The team claims one national championship, which came in 1970 at the NCAA College Division level.

In 2008, the school changed its mascot from the Indians to the Red Wolves.

== History ==
=== Early years (1911–1953) ===
The school was founded in 1909, and, two years later, Arkansas State fielded its first football team. In 1918, the team was temporarily disbanded due to the First World War. Arkansas State played without conference affiliation until 1929 when it joined the Arkansas Intercollegiate Conference. From 1937 until 1953, Arkansas State competed as a member of the National Junior College Athletic Association (NJCAA). After the 1941 season, the football program was interrupted due to World War II and did not resume until the 1945 season. The school left the AIC in 1950 and would remain independent of conference affiliation for the next 12 years.

During the 1950s under coach Forrest England, A-State emerged as a bit of a regional football power, appearing in four post-season bowl games from 1951 to 1953. The Indians compiled a 48–22–9 record under England. The Indians played in two bowls at the end of the 1951 season, winning the Refrigerator Bowl and losing the Tangerine Bowl (now known as the Capital One Bowl). The Indians lost the 1952 Refrigerator Bowl and tied the 1953 Tangerine Bowl.

=== College Division years (1953–1972) ===
In 1953, Arkansas State moved to the NCAA, and played as a member of the College Division through 1972. The early part of this era was characterized by mediocre records under several short-term head coaches. In 1962 head coach King Block departed for Nebraska where he was to serve as defensive line coach.

Bennie Ellender was promoted from defensive backs coach to head coach, replacing Block in 1963 just prior to A-State joining the Southland Conference. Ellender would serve for 8 seasons compiling a 52–20–4 record culminating in an undefeated 11–0 College Division National Championship year in 1970. This championship season included a victory over Central Missouri State in the Pecan Bowl, the Indians' 3rd consecutive bowl appearance under Ellender and 3rd straight Southland Conference championship. Ellender departed after the 1970 season to accept the head football coach position at his alma mater Tulane.

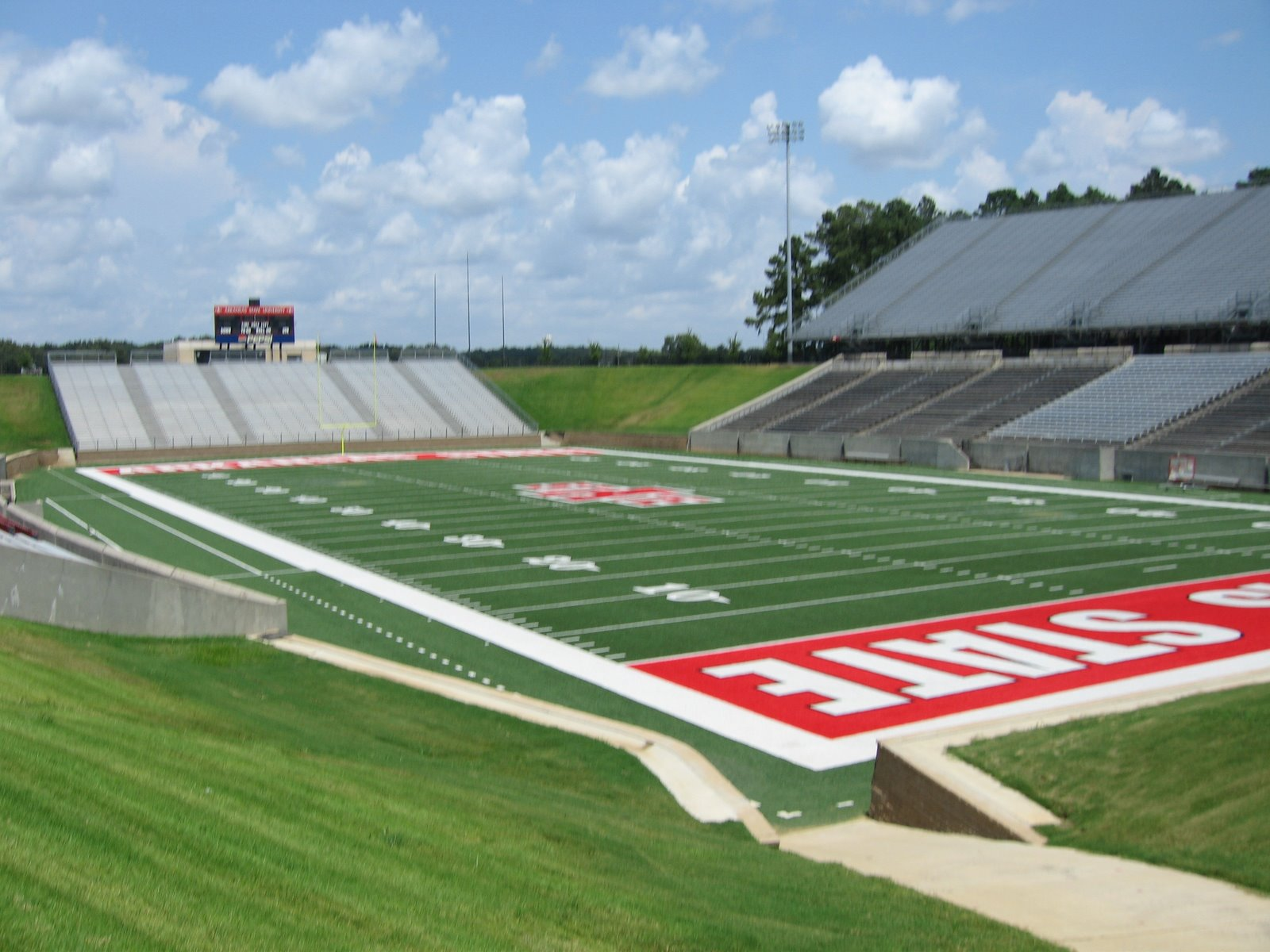
Centennial Bank Stadium, formerly known as Liberty Bank Stadium

=== Divisional realignment years (1973–1991) ===
In 1973, under head coach Bill Davidson, the Indians were assigned to the newly created Division II. They remained in this classification for one year before being promoted to Division I. Arkansas State recorded an undefeated season (going 11–0) in Division I in 1975 and was one of only two undefeated Division I football teams that year. Arkansas State is one of only four institutions to have gone undefeated and not win a national championship at the Division I-A (now Division I FBS) level. Since Arkansas State was a member of the Southland Conference, and the league did not have a bowl game tie-in, Arkansas State was not selected for post-season play despite being undefeated. As a result of this inequity, the Independence Bowl in Shreveport, Louisiana was created (though A-State has never played in the game). Davidson retired after the 1978 season due to health problems. Davidson compiled a 51–32–1 record during his tenure.

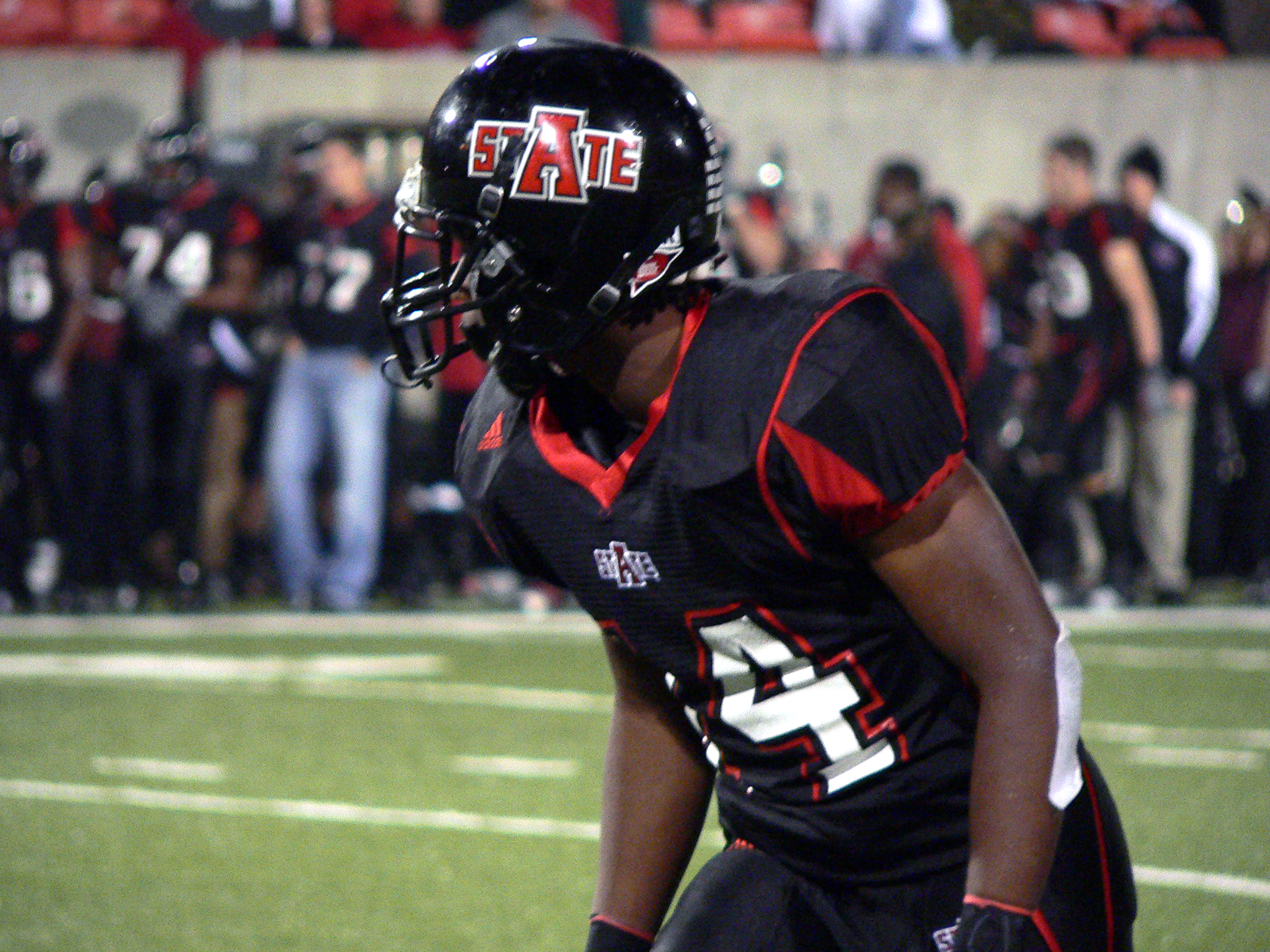
An Arkansas State player in home uniform.

During the 1980s, under head coach Larry Lacewell, Arkansas State played in the NCAA Division I-AA (now Division I FCS) compiling a 69–58–4 record and making four appearances in the playoffs, including a loss in the national championship game in 1986 to Georgia Southern, 48–21. After the 1986 season Arkansas State left the Southland Conference and became a I-AA Independent. Lacewell left A-State in 1989 after 11 seasons to accept an offer to be Johnny Majors' defensive coordinator at Tennessee.

Lacewell's departure came as the decision was being reached for Arkansas State to pursue entry into what is now Division I FBS.

=== FBS transition years (1992–2010) ===
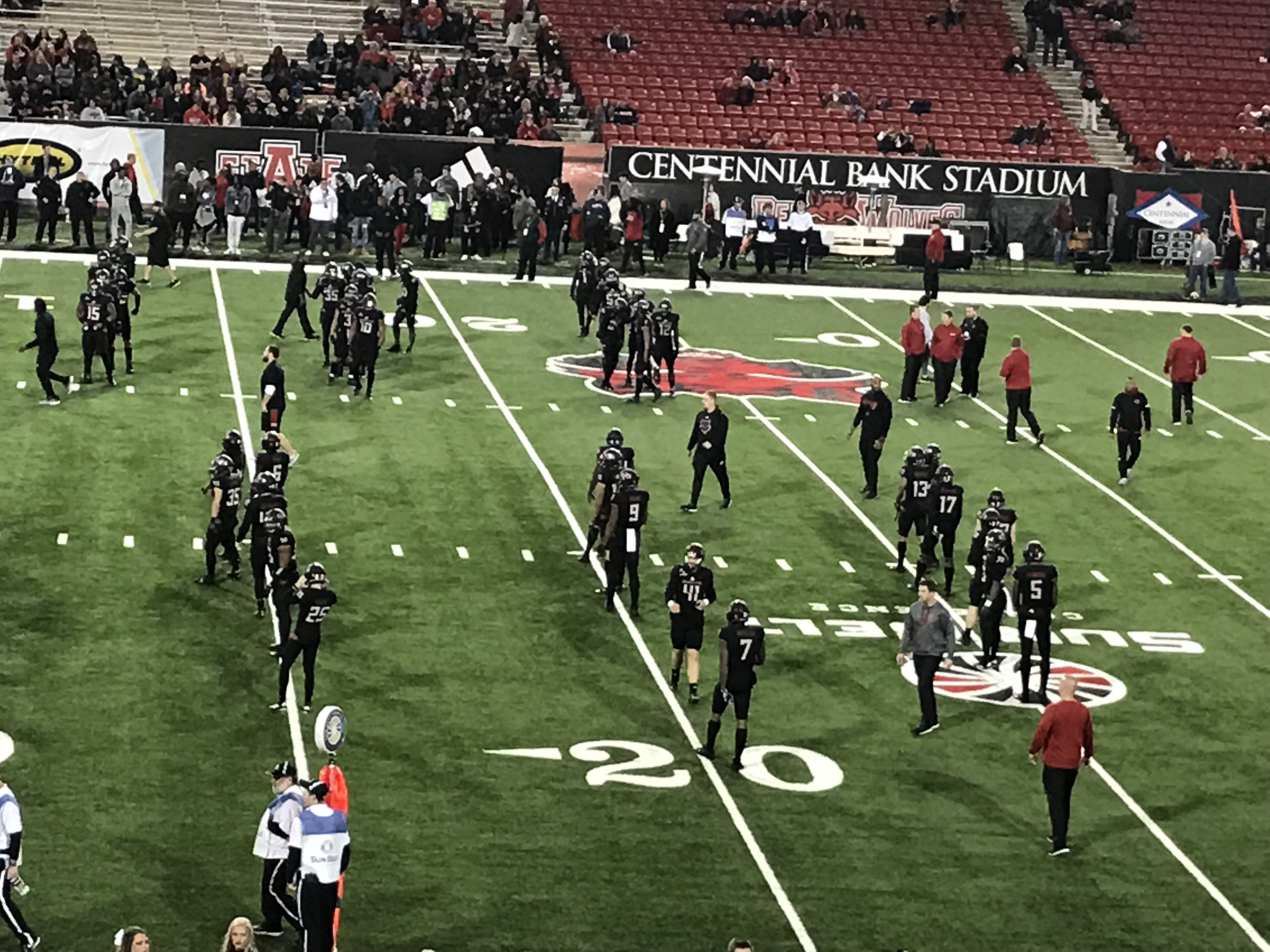
Arkansas State took on Troy in a decisive matchup for the Sun Belt Conference Title on Dec. 2, 2017. Troy went on to win by a score of 32–25.

The transition from I-AA (FCS) to I-A (FBS) football was a painful one for Arkansas State. The school spent most of the decade as a I-A Independent with two separate two-year stints as a member of the Big West Conference.

Al Kincaid came to Jonesboro from his post as an assistant at Alabama. He served as head coach for two seasons, posting 4–17–1 record before his dismissal. Kincaid was replaced by former Alabama head coach Ray Perkins. Perkins tenure was highly anticipated but ultimately a failure as he posted a 2–9 record in one season before joining Bill Parcells' staff with the New England Patriots as offensive coordinator.

Perkins was replaced by offensive line coach John Bobo who oversaw moderate improvements to the team's performance including A-State's first winning record since the start of the transition but he was unable to sustain that success and was fired after the 1996 season.

Bobo was replaced by the highly sought after offensive coordinator at Ohio State, Joe Hollis. Hollis was unable to adapt and posted a 13–43 record in five seasons before being relieved after the 2001 season.

In 2001 the Sun Belt Conference added football and Arkansas State joined the conference as an inaugural football member.

Steve Roberts came to Arkansas State from Northwestern State and was A-State's head football coach for nine seasons (2002–2010), where he compiled a 45–63 record. Although Roberts finished with an overall losing record at Arkansas State, the A-State football program made great strides under his leadership. During the 2005 football season, Arkansas State finished the regular season as Sun Belt Conference champions with a record of 6 wins and 5 losses and was invited to the New Orleans Bowl. This was the school's first bowl game since the trip to the 1970 Pecan Bowl and subsequent national college division championship. The Indians lost to The University of Southern Mississippi in the game, which was played that year in the city of Lafayette, Louisiana due to the lingering effects of Hurricane Katrina. The NCAA required Arkansas State to forfeit six football wins from the 2006 season and four from 2005 season in football saying the school used ineligible players. The NCAA also said that it has cut one football for two years. The penalties stem from the school allowing 31 ineligible athletes during the 2005–08 seasons because of a failure to meet NCAA rules on progress-toward-degree requirements.

In 2008, Arkansas State changed its name from the Indians to the Red Wolves and defeated Texas A&M in their inaugural game with the new mascot.

=== Freeze-Malzahn-Harsin era (2011–2013) ===
This three-year period saw the Red Wolves achieve remarkable success on the field in the midst of turnover in its coaching staff. The players recruited by Steve Roberts played in three conference championships and three bowl games, and had two 10-win seasons under three different head coaches. Red Wolf players played all three bowl games without their head coach and with depleted coaching staffs. The program's continued success during the adversity of constant coaching changes received considerable national attention.

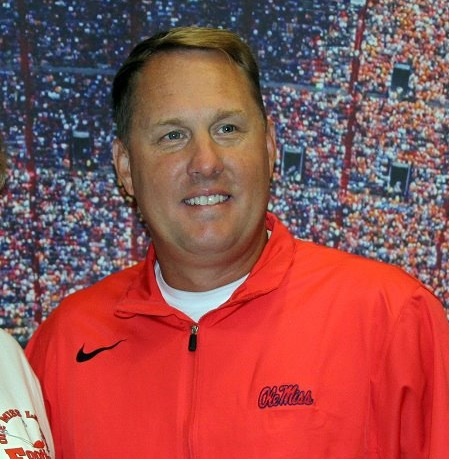
Hugh Freeze

In 2011, led by first-year head coach Hugh Freeze, Arkansas State went undefeated in the Sun Belt conference, a perfect 8–0 record, as well as going 10–2 overall. After the last regular season game, Freeze took the head coaching job at Ole Miss, taking four assistants with him. Running backs coach David Gunn was named the interim head coach and led the team to Mobile, Alabama for the 2012 GoDaddy.com Bowl. In that bowl, held on January 8, 2012, the Red Wolves were led by quarterback Ryan Aplin, as they squared off against the Northern Illinois Huskies at Ladd-Peebles Stadium. Northern Illinois rallied back from a thirteen-point deficit for a 38–20 victory. Also in attendance in Mobile was Gus Malzahn, who was named Arkansas State's new head football coach on December 14, 2011.

Gus Malzahn came to the Red Wolves from Auburn, where he had served the previous three seasons as offensive coordinator. In 2012, Arkansas State lost only one game in the Sun Belt Conference. For the first time in school history, they had back to back 10 win seasons (10–3 in 2012) and back to back Sun Belt conference championships. On December 4, 2012, Malzahn announced his return to Auburn as head coach, thus making it two years in a row the team would be coached by an interim in the post season. John Thompson coached the team to 17–13 victory at the 2013 GoDaddy.com Bowl against No. 25 Kent State on January 6, 2013. Former Texas Longhorns football offensive coordinator Bryan Harsin was named on December 11, 2012, to succeed the departing Malzahn.

In 2013, Arkansas State under Bryan Harsin won the Sun Belt Conference, and received a bid to the GoDaddy Bowl for the 3rd time in as many years with a 7–5 (5–2 conference) regular season record. They were deemed co-champions this year with the UL-Lafayette Ragin Cajuns who were also 5–2 in conference. Before the GoDaddy Bowl, Harsin joined his predecessors in announcing his departure after one season to coach at his alma mater, Boise State. Harsin's contract included a $1.75 million buyout which was paid by Boise State. Defensive Coordinator John Thompson coached the team in the GoDaddy Bowl where Arkansas State blocked a Ball State field goal in the final seconds to hold on to a 23–20 win. A noteworthy point of interest of all three of these coaches, they would all eventually go on to become the head coach of the Auburn Tigers.

=== Blake Anderson era (2014–2020) ===
On December 19, 2013, Arkansas State hired Blake Anderson as the new head coach away from his offensive coordinator post at the University of North Carolina. In an attempt to end the "One and Done" era and provide much-needed coaching stability, Arkansas State placed a hefty buyout provision in Anderson's $700,000 per year five-year contract specifying a $3 million buyout for the first two years, $2 million for the third and fourth years, and $1 million in the final year.

The Red Wolves opened the 2015 season 0–2 with losses to both No. 8 USC and No. 21 Missouri. Arkansas State would go on to win 9 of the next 11 with victories over App State and rival Louisiana-Monroe. With their win over App State on November 5, the Red Wolves glided to their 4th Sun Belt title since 2010 and an appearance in the New Orleans Bowl.

Expectations were high for the 2016 season but the Red Wolves started the campaign with four straight losses to Toledo, Auburn, Utah State and in-state FCS opponent Central Arkansas. But during Sun Belt Conference play the Red Wolves reeled off six straight victories including a road win against No. 25 Troy that denied the Trojans a share of the Sun Belt crown. The Red Wolves had a chance to secure a sole conference championship by winning its last two games but faltered when a last-second touchdown was reversed by replay at Louisiana. The Red Wolves secured a win in their final regular season game at Texas State which assured them of a shared conference championship with Appalachian State. The Red Wolves were selected for the 2016 Cure Bowl where they defeated UCF 31–13 in their own hometown. On Dec 10, 2020, Anderson resigned.

=== Butch Jones era (2020–present) ===
Butch Jones was announced as the Red Wolves head coach on December 12, 2020. Jones had previous head coaching stints at Central Michigan, Cincinnati and Tennessee and prior to his hire at Arkansas State was a special assistant to Nick Saban at Alabama.

== Division history ==
Year	Division
1937–1952	NJCAA
1953–1955	NCAA (pre-divisional split)
1956–1972	NCAA College Division (Small College)
1973–1974	NCAA Division II
1975–1977	NCAA Division I
1978–1981	NCAA Division I-A
1982–1991	NCAA Division I-AA
1992–present	NCAA Division I-A/FBS

== Conference affiliations ==
Arkansas State has been both independent and affiliated with multiple conferences.

- Independent (1911–1929, 1951–1963, 1987–1992, 1996–1998)
- Arkansas Intercollegiate Conference (1930–1950)
- Southland Conference (1964–1986)
- Big West Conference (1993–1995, 1999–2000)
- Sun Belt Conference (2001–present)

== Championships ==
=== National championships ===
Arkansas State claims one national championship, a 1970 NCAA Division II championship.

Year	Coach	Division	Record	CG Opponent	Result
1970	Bennie Ellender	NCAA Division II	11–0	Central Missouri	W 38–21

=== Conference championships ===
Arkansas State claims 12 conference titles, most recently of the Sun Belt Conference in 2016.

Year	Conference	Overall Record	Conference Record	Coach
1968	Southland Conference	7–3–1	3–0–1	Bennie Ellender
1969	Southland Conference	8–1–1	4–0	Bennie Ellender
1970	Southland Conference	11–0	4–0	Bennie Ellender
1975	Southland Conference	11–0	5–0	Bill Davidson
1978	Southland Conference	7–4		Bill Davidson
1985	Southland Conference	9–4	5–1	Larry Lacewell
1986	Southland Conference	12–2–1	5–0	Larry Lacewell
2011	Sun Belt Conference	10–3	8–0	Hugh Freeze
2012	Sun Belt Conference	10–3	7–1	Gus Malzahn
2013	Sun Belt Conference	8–5	5–2	Bryan Harsin
2015	Sun Belt Conference	9–4	8–0	Blake Anderson
2016†	Sun Belt Conference	8–5	7–1	Blake Anderson

† Co-champions

== Postseason games ==
=== College division and other bowl games ===
Arkansas State (then known as the Indians) went 3–3–1 in six games that were "College Division" bowl games prior to the NCAA instituting playoffs for lower division teams in 1973. They participated in two bowl game in one season (1951), playing one on December 2 and the other on January 1.

Season	Coach	Bowl	Opponent	Result
1951	Forrest England	Refrigerator Bowl	Camp Breckinridge	W 46–12
1951	Forrest England	Tangerine Bowl	Stetson	L 20–35
1952	Forrest England	Refrigerator Bowl	Western Kentucky State	L 19–34
1953	Forrest England	Tangerine Bowl	East Texas State	T 7–7
1968	Bennie Ellender	Pecan Bowl	North Dakota State	L 14–23
1969	Bennie Ellender	Pecan Bowl	Drake	W 29–21
1970	Bennie Ellender	Pecan Bowl	Central Missouri State	W 38–21

=== NCAA Division I-AA/FCS playoff games ===
The Red Wolves have appeared in the I-AA/FCS playoffs four times with an overall record of 6–4.

Season	Coach	Playoff	Opponent	Result
1984	Larry Lacewell	I-AA First Round; I-AA Quarterfinals	Tennessee-Chattanooga; Montana State	W 37–10; L 14–31
1985	Larry Lacewell	I-AA First Round; I-AA Quarterfinals	Grambling State; Nevada	W 10–7; L 23–24
1986	Larry Lacewell	I-AA First Round; I-AA Quarterfinals; I-AA Semifinals; I-AA Championship Game	Sam Houston State; Delaware; Eastern Kentucky; Georgia Southern	W 48–7; W 55–23; W 24–10; L 21–48
1987	Larry Lacewell	I-AA First Round; I-AA Quarterfinals	Jackson State; Northern Iowa	W 35–32; L 28–49

=== NCAA Division I-A/FBS bowl games ===
The Red Wolves have played in thirteen bowl games, garnering a record of 6–7.

Season	Coach	Bowl	Opponent	Result
2005	Steve Roberts	New Orleans Bowl	Southern Miss	L 19–31
2011	David Gunn	GoDaddy.com Bowl	Northern Illinois	L 20–38
2012	John Thompson	GoDaddy.com Bowl	Kent State	W 17–13
2013	John Thompson	GoDaddy Bowl	Ball State	W 23–20
2014	Blake Anderson	GoDaddy Bowl	Toledo	L 44–63
2015	Blake Anderson	New Orleans Bowl	Louisiana Tech	L 28–47
2016	Blake Anderson	Cure Bowl	UCF	W 31–13
2017	Blake Anderson	Camellia Bowl	Middle Tennessee	L 30–35
2018	Blake Anderson	Arizona Bowl	Nevada	L 13–16^{OT}
2019	Blake Anderson	Camellia Bowl	FIU	W 34–26
2023	Butch Jones	Camellia Bowl	Northern Illinois	L 19–21
2024	Butch Jones	68 Ventures Bowl	Bowling Green	W 38–31
2025	Butch Jones	Xbox Bowl	Missouri State	W 34–28

== Head coaches ==
There have been 34 different head coaching tenures at Arkansas State. The current head coach is Butch Jones, who was hired on December 12, 2020.

No.	Tenure	Coach	Seasons	Games	Record	Pct.
1	1911–1912	F. T. Parks	2	6	4–2	.667
2	1913	Clint Young	1	5	3–1–1	.700
3	1914–1917	Earl W. Brannon	4	27	16–9–2	.630
4	1919–1920	Foy Hammons	2	13	5–8	.385
5	1921–1923	Tom Dandelet	3	14	3–15–1	.184
6	1924	Basil Stanley	1	8	4–4	.500
7	1925–1930	Herbert Schwartz	6	46	18–21–7	.467
8	1931–1932	Jack Dale	2	15	9–6	.600
9	1933	Elza Renfro	1	8	2–4–2	.375
10	1934–1935	Tommy Mills	2	17	4–12–1	.265
11	1936–1938	Leslie Speck	3	20	7–13	.350
12	1939–1941	Bill Adams	3	21	5–14–2	.286
13	1945	Ike Tomlinson	1	7	2–4–1	.357
14	1946–1953	Forrest England	8	79	48–22–9	.665
15	1954	Glen Harmeson	1	9	1–8	.111
16	1955–1957	Gene Harlow	3	27	15–12	.556
17	1958–1959	Hugh Taylor	2	18	7–11	.389
18	1960–1962	King Block	3	27	13–14	.481
19	1963–1970	Bennie Ellender	8	76	52–20–4	.711
20	1971–1978	Bill Davidson	8	84	51–32–1	.613
21	1979–1989	Larry Lacewell	11	131	69–58–4	.542
22	1990–1991	Al Kincaid	2	22	4–17–1	.205
23	1992	Ray Perkins	1	11	2–9	.182
24	1993–1996	John Bobo	4	44	13–30–1	.307
25	1997–2001	Joe Hollis	5	56	13–43	.232
26	2002–2010	Steve Roberts	9	108	35–63†	.357
27	2011	Hugh Freeze	1	12	10–2	.833
28	2011	David Gunn‡	1	1	0–1	.000
29	2012	Gus Malzahn	1	12	9–3	.750
30	2012	John Thompson‡	1	1	1–0	1.000
31	2013	Bryan Harsin	1	12	7–5	.583
32	2013	John Thompson‡	1	1	1–0	1.000
33	2014–2020	Blake Anderson	7	88	51–37	.580
34	2021–present	Butch Jones	4	50	19–31	.380

† 10 wins later vacated due to NCAA sanctions, 45–63 record on-field.

‡ Interim head coach

== Rivalries ==
=== Memphis ===
The series between the Arkansas State Red Wolves and the Memphis Tigers is the oldest as well as the longest the A-State program has had and is the second most often played series for Memphis. The first game was played in 1914.

There have been some memorable moments in the series. In 2004, Memphis defeated Arkansas State 47–35 before 30,427 fans, the largest crowd to ever watch a game at then-named Indian Stadium. In 2006, Arkansas State beat Memphis at the Liberty Bowl Stadium in Memphis, Tennessee after a last second Hail Mary touchdown to secure the win, 26–23, and end a ten-game losing streak to the Tigers. The teams met again in 2007 at Indian Stadium, where the Indians rallied in the second half to beat the Tigers 35–31 after trailing 31–6 at halftime. The schools have met 62 times, with the Tigers leading the series 33–23–5.

In 2016, the schools announced the series will be brought back once again starting in 2020. Arkansas State and Memphis played four games from 2020 to 2023. The first game was played in Memphis on September 5, 2020. A further four games are scheduled between 2026 and 2029

== Players ==
=== Current NFL players ===
- Don Jones, S
- Demario Davis, LB, New Orleans Saints
- Blake Grupe, K, New Orleans Saints
- Kelcie McCray, S,
- Derek Newton, OT
- Ryan Carrethers, NT
- J. D. McKissic, RB, Washington Commanders
- Omar Bayless, WR, Carolina Panthers
- Kirk Merritt, WR, Miami Dolphins

=== Current CFL players ===
- Justin McInnis, WR,
- Kendall Sanders WR,
- Cody Grace, P
- Kyle Wilson, LB

=== Former players ===
- Ryan Aplin, QB
- Reggie Arnold, RB
- Fred Barnett, WR
- Bill Bergey, LB
- Alex Carrington, DT
- Maurice Carthon, RB
- Carlos Emmons, LB
- Bryan Hall, DT
- Leroy Harris, RB
- M. D. Jennings, S
- Bill Johnson, RB
- Tyrell Johnson, S
- Ken Jones, OL
- Cleo Lemon, QB
- Ron Meeks, DB
- Dennis Meyer, DB
- Jerry Muckensturm, LB
- Kyle Richardson, P
- Elbert Shelley, DB
- Ray Brown, OL
- Oren O'Neal, FB
- Corey Williams, DT
- Mitch Young, DE
- James Hickenbotham, All Purpose
- David Johnson, TE
- Chris Odom, LB

== Future non-conference opponents ==
Announced schedules as of October 14, 2026.

2026	2027	2028	2029	2031
at Memphis	at Virginia	at Georgia Tech	Memphis	at Mississippi State
West Georgia	Central Arkansas	Missouri State		
at TCU	Memphis	at Memphis		
Kennesaw State	at Missouri State			
