= List of Central Michigan Chippewas football seasons =

The following is a list of Central Michigan Chippewas football seasons for the football team that has represented Central Michigan University in NCAA competition.

== Seasons ==
Year	Coach	Overall	Conference	Standing	Bowl/playoffs	Coaches^{#}	AP^{°}
Pete McCormick (Independent) (1896)
1896	Pete McCormick	3–1					
Pete McCormick:		3–1					
Carl Pray (Independent) (1897–1899)
1897	Carl Pray	2–1					
1898	Carl Pray	1–2					
1899	Carl Pray	3–2					
Carl Pray:		6–5					
1900	Unknown	1–0					
1901	No team						
Charles Tambling (Independent) (1902–1905)
1902	Charles Tambling	4–0					
1903	Charles Tambling	6–0					
1904	Charles Tambling	0–1					
1905	Charles Tambling	7–1					
Charles Tambling (first stint):		17–2					
1906	No team						
Ralph Thacker (Independent) (1907)
1907	Ralph Thacker	2–4					
Ralph Thacker:		2–4					
Hugh Sutherland (Independent) (1908)
1908	Hugh Sutherland	4–3					
Hugh Sutherland:		4–3					
Harry Helmer (Independent) (1909–1912)
1909	Harry Helmer	4–3					
1910	Harry Helmer	6–1–1					
1911	Harry Helmer	3–3					
1912	Harry Helmer	2–1–2					
Harry Helmer:		15–8–3					
1913–15	No team						
Blake Miller (Independent) (1916)
1916	Blake Miller	1–5					
Blake Miller:		1–5					
Fred Johnson (American football coach) (Independent) (1917)
1917	Fred Johnson	1–2					
Fred Johnson:		1–2					
Charles Tambling (Independent) (1918)
1918	Charles Tambling	1–0					
Charles Tambling (second stint):		1–0					
Charles Tambling (total):		18–2					
Garland Nevitt (Independent) (1919)
1919	Garland Nevitt	2–2–3					
Garland Nevitt:		2–2–3					
Joe Simmons (Independent) (1920)
1920	Joe Simmons	4–3–1					
Joe Simmons:		4–3–1					
Wallace Parker (Independent) (1921–1923)
1921	Wallace Parker	5–1–1					
1922	Wallace Parker	6–0–2					
1923	Wallace Parker	5–1–2					
Wallace Parker (first stint):		16–2–5					
Lester Barnard (Independent) (1924–1925)
1924	Lester Barnard	7–1					
1925	Lester Barnard	4–1–3					
Lester Barnard:		11–2–3					
Wallace Parker (Independent) (1926)
1926	Wallace Parker	3–4–1					
Wallace Parker (Michigan Collegiate Conference) (1927–1928)
1927	Wallace Parker	7–1	2–1	2nd			
1928	Wallace Parker	6–3	2–1				
Wallace Parker (second stint):		16–8–1	3–3				
Wallace Parker (total):		32–10–6	3–3				
Butch Nowack (Michigan Collegiate Conference) (1929–1930)
1929	Butch Nowack	2–3–2	0–3	4th			
1930	Butch Nowack	6–2	1–2	3rd			
Butch Nowack:		8–5–2	1–5				
George Van Bibber (Independent) (1931–1933)
1931	George Van Bibber	4–3					
1932	George Van Bibber	3–4–1					
1933	George Van Bibber	5–2–1					
George Van Bibber:		12–9–2					
Alex Yunevich (Independent) (1934–1936)
1934	Alex Yunevich	5–3					
1935	Alex Yunevich	2–6					
1936	Alex Yunevich	3–4–1					
Alex Yunevich:		9–13–1					
Ron Finch (Independent) (1937–1946)
1937	Ron Finch	6–2					
1938	Ron Finch	7–1					
1939	Ron Finch	8–1					
1940	Ron Finch	4–3–1					
1941	Ron Finch	4–3					
1942	Ron Finch	6–0					
1943	Ron Finch	2–3					
1944	Ron Finch	5–2					
1945	Ron Finch	6–1					
1946	Ron Finch	6–2					
Ron Finch:		54–18–1					
Lyle Bennett (Independent) (1947–1949)
1947	Lyle Bennett	2–5–1					
1948	Lyle Bennett	3–6					
1949	Lyle Bennett	3–4					
Lyle Bennett:		8–15–1					
Warren Schmakel (Interstate Intercollegiate Athletic Conference) (1950)
1950	Warren Schmakel	6–4	2–2	T–3rd			
Warren Schmakel:		6–4	2–2				
Kenneth Kelly (Interstate Intercollegiate Athletic Conference) (1951–1966)
1951	Kenneth Kelly	5–3	4–2	3rd			
1952	Kenneth Kelly	7–2	6–0	1st			
1953	Kenneth Kelly	7–1–1	5–0–1	1st			
1954	Kenneth Kelly	8–2	5–1	T–1st			
1955	Kenneth Kelly	8–1	5–1	T–1st			
1956	Kenneth Kelly	9–0	6–0	1st			
1957	Kenneth Kelly	4–6	4–2	T–2nd			
1958	Kenneth Kelly	7–3	4–2	T–2nd			
1959	Kenneth Kelly	7–3	4–2	T–2nd			
1960	Kenneth Kelly	3–5	3–3	4th			
1961	Kenneth Kelly	2–8	1–5	6th			
1962	Kenneth Kelly	6–4	4–0	1st			
1963	Kenneth Kelly	4–5–1	2–2	3rd			
1964	Kenneth Kelly	4–5	1–3	T–4th			
1965	Kenneth Kelly	5–5	3–1	2nd			
1966	Kenneth Kelly	5–5	3–0	1st			
Kenneth Kelly:		91–58–2	70–24–1				
Roy Kramer (Interstate Intercollegiate Athletic Conference) (1967–1969)
1967	Roy Kramer	8–2	2–1	T–1st			
1968	Roy Kramer	7–2	2–1	T–1st			
1969	Roy Kramer	7–3	2–1	2nd			
Roy Kramer (NCAA College Division / Division II independent) (1970–1974)
1970	Roy Kramer	7–3					
1971	Roy Kramer	5–5					
1972	Roy Kramer	5–5–1					
1973	Roy Kramer	7–4					
1974	Roy Kramer	12–1			W NCAA Division II Championship	7 (Note: Rankings from UPI coaches small college poll)	1 (Note: Rankings from AP small college poll)
Roy Kramer (Mid-American Conference) (1975–1977)
1975	Roy Kramer	8–2–1	4–1–1	2nd			
1976	Roy Kramer	7–4	4–3	T–5th			
1977	Roy Kramer	10–1	7–1	2nd			
Roy Kramer:		83–32–2	21–8–1				
Herb Deromedi (Mid-American Conference) (1978–1993)
1978	Herb Deromedi	9–2	8–1	2nd			
1979	Herb Deromedi	10–0–1	8–0–1	1st			
1980	Herb Deromedi	9–2	7–2	1st			
1981	Herb Deromedi	7–4	7–2	3rd			
1982	Herb Deromedi	6–4–1	5–3–1	4th			
1983	Herb Deromedi	8–3	7–2	T–2nd			
1984	Herb Deromedi	8–2–1	6–2–1	3rd			
1985	Herb Deromedi	7–3	6–3	3rd			
1986	Herb Deromedi	5–5	4–4	T–5th			
1987	Herb Deromedi	5–5–1	3–4–1	6th			
1988	Herb Deromedi	7–4	5–3	T–2nd			
1989	Herb Deromedi	5–5–1	5–2–1	4th			
1990	Herb Deromedi	8–3–1	7–1	T–1st	L California		
1991	Herb Deromedi	6–1–4	3–1–4	2nd			
1992	Herb Deromedi	5–6	4–5	7th			
1993	Herb Deromedi	5–6	5–4	4th			
Herb Deromedi:		110–55–10	90–55–9				
Dick Flynn (Mid-American Conference) (1994–1999)
1994	Dick Flynn	9–3	8–1	1st	L Las Vegas		
1995	Dick Flynn	4–7	2–6	T–7th			
1996	Dick Flynn	5–6	4–4	5th			
1997	Dick Flynn	2–9	1–7	5th (West)			
1998	Dick Flynn	6–5	5–3	T–2nd (West)			
1999	Dick Flynn	4–7	3–5	5th (West)			
Dick Flynn:		30–37	23–26				
Mike DeBord (Mid-American Conference) (2000–2003)
2000	Mike DeBord	2–9	2–6	6th (West)			
2001	Mike DeBord	3–8	2–6	5th (West)			
2002	Mike DeBord	4–8	2–6	5th (West)			
2003	Mike DeBord	3–9	1–7	7th (West)			
Mike DeBord:		12–34	7–25				
Brian Kelly (Mid-American Conference) (2004–2006)
2004	Brian Kelly	4–7	3–5	5th (West)			
2005	Brian Kelly	6–5	5–3	4th (West)			
2006	Brian Kelly / Jeff Quinn	10–4	7–1	1st (West)	W Motor City		
Brian Kelly:		19–16	15–9				
Jeff Quinn:		1–0					
Butch Jones (Mid-American Conference) (2007–2009)
2007	Butch Jones	8–6	6–1	1st (West)	L Motor City		
2008	Butch Jones	8–5	6–2	T–2nd (West)	L Motor City		
2009	Butch Jones / Steve Stripling	12–2	8–0	1st (West)	W GMAC	24	23
Butch Jones:		27–13	20–3				
Steve Stripling:		1–0					
Dan Enos (Mid-American Conference) (2010–2014)
2010	Dan Enos	3–9	2–6	T–5th (West)			
2011	Dan Enos	3–9	2–6	6th (West)			
2012	Dan Enos	7–6	4–4	4th (West)	W Little Caesars		
2013	Dan Enos	6–6	5–3	T–3rd (West)			
2014	Dan Enos	7–6	5–3	4th (West)	L Bahamas		
Dan Enos:		26–36	18–22				
John Bonamego (Mid-American Conference) (2015–2018)
2015	John Bonamego	7–6	6–2	T–1st (West)	L Quick Lane		
2016	John Bonamego	6–7	3–5	5th (West)	L Miami Beach		
2017	John Bonamego	8–5	6–2	T–2nd (West)	L Famous Idaho Potato		
2018	John Bonamego	1–11	0–8	6th (West)			
John Bonamego:		22–29	15–17				
Jim McElwain (Mid-American Conference) (2019–2024)
2019	Jim McElwain	8–6	6–2	1st (West)	L New Mexico		
2020	Jim McElwain	3–3	3–3	4th (West)			
2021	Jim McElwain	9–4	6–2	T–1st (West)	W Sun		
2022	Jim McElwain	4–8	3–5	T–4th (West)			
2023	Jim McElwain	5–7	3–5	T–4th (West)			
2024	Jim McElwain	4–8	2–6	T–9th			
Jim McElwain:		33–36	23–23				
Matt Drinkall (Mid-American Conference) (2025–present)
2025	Matt Drinkall	7–6	5–3	5th	L GameAbove Sports		
Matt Drinkall:		7–6	5–3				
Total:		658–464–36 (.584)					
National championship Conference title Conference division title or championship game berth
^{#}Rankings from final Coaches Poll.; ^{°}Rankings from final AP Poll.
