= 1985 Central Michigan Chippewas football team =

American college football season

1985 Central Michigan Chippewas football
- Conference: Mid-American Conference
- Record: 7–3 (6–3 MAC)
- Head coach: Herb Deromedi (8th season)
- MVPs: Carl Kloosterman; Steve Sklenar
- Home stadium: Kelly/Shorts Stadium

1985 Mid-American Conference football standings
	Conf.					Overall
Team	W		L		T	W		L		T
Bowling Green $	9	–	0	–	0	11	–	1	–	0
Miami (OH)	7	–	1	–	1	8	–	2	–	1
Central Michigan	6	–	3	–	0	7	–	3	–	0
Western Michigan	4	–	4	–	1	4	–	6	–	1
Northern Illinois	4	–	4	–	0	4	–	7	–	0
Ball State	3	–	6	–	0	4	–	7	–	0
Eastern Michigan	3	–	6	–	0	4	–	7	–	0
Toledo	3	–	6	–	0	4	–	7	–	0
Kent State	2	–	6	–	0	3	–	8	–	0
Ohio	2	–	7	–	0	2	–	9	–	0
$ – Conference champion

The 1985 Central Michigan Chippewas football team represented Central Michigan University in the Mid-American Conference (MAC) during the 1985 NCAA Division I-A football season. In their eighth season under head coach Herb Deromedi, the Chippewas compiled a 7–3 record (6–3 against MAC opponents), finished in third place in the MAC standings, and outscored their opponents, 194 to 143. The team played its home games in Kelly/Shorts Stadium in Mount Pleasant, Michigan, with attendance of 96,735 in five home games.

The team's statistical leaders included quarterback Ron Fillmore with 1,191 passing yards, Tony Brown with 655 rushing yards, and John DeBoer with 494 receiving yards. Cornerback Carl Kloosterman and outside linebacker Steve Sklenar received the team's most valuable player award. Three Central Michigan players (Kloosterman, Sklenar, and offensive guard Rick Poljan) received first-team All-MAC honors.

== Schedule ==
Date	Opponent	Site	Result	Attendance	Source
September 14	Pacific (CA)*	Kelly/Shorts Stadium; Mount Pleasant, MI	W 27–10	24,922	
September 28	at Ohio	Peden Stadium; Athens, OH	W 13–7		
October 5	Kent State	Kelly/Shorts Stadium; Mount Pleasant, MI	W 21–17	18,463	
October 12	at Western Michigan	Waldo Stadium; Kalamazoo, MI (rivalry)	W 24–17	18,072	
October 19	at Bowling Green	Doyt Perry Stadium; Bowling Green, OH	L 18–23	16,500	
October 26	Eastern Michigan	Kelly/Shorts Stadium; Mount Pleasant, MI (rivalry)	W 17–10		
November 2	Miami (OH)	Kelly/Shorts Stadium; Mount Pleasant, MI	L 14–19	15,321	
November 9	at Toledo	Glass Bowl; Toledo, OH	L 7–10		
November 16	at Ball State	Scheumann Stadium; Muncie, IN	W 23–9		
November 23	Northern Illinois	Kelly/Shorts Stadium; Mount Pleasant, MI	W 30–21	12,016	
*Non-conference game
