= 1985 Western Michigan Broncos football team =

American college football season

1985 Western Michigan Broncos football
- Conference: Mid-American Conference
- Record: 4–6–1 (4–4–1 MAC)
- Head coach: Jack Harbaugh (4th season)
- Offensive coordinator: Dan Ferrigno (1st season)
- MVP: John Offerdahl
- Captains: Chris Conklin; Sam Culbert; John Offerdahl
- Home stadium: Waldo Stadium

1985 Mid-American Conference football standings
	Conf.					Overall
Team	W		L		T	W		L		T
Bowling Green $	9	–	0	–	0	11	–	1	–	0
Miami (OH)	7	–	1	–	1	8	–	2	–	1
Central Michigan	6	–	3	–	0	7	–	3	–	0
Western Michigan	4	–	4	–	1	4	–	6	–	1
Northern Illinois	4	–	4	–	0	4	–	7	–	0
Ball State	3	–	6	–	0	4	–	7	–	0
Eastern Michigan	3	–	6	–	0	4	–	7	–	0
Toledo	3	–	6	–	0	4	–	7	–	0
Kent State	2	–	6	–	0	3	–	8	–	0
Ohio	2	–	7	–	0	2	–	9	–	0
$ – Conference champion

The 1985 Western Michigan Broncos football team represented Western Michigan University in the Mid-American Conference (MAC) during the 1985 NCAA Division I-A football season. In their fourth season under head coach Jack Harbaugh, the Broncos compiled a 4–6–1 record (4–4–1 against MAC opponents), finished in a tie for fourth place in the MAC, and were outscored by their opponents, 212 to 182. The team played its home games at Waldo Stadium in Kalamazoo, Michigan.

The team's statistical leaders included Chris Conklin with 1,574 passing yards, Lewis Howard with 819 rushing yards, and Paul Sorce with 567 receiving yards. Quarterback Chris Conklin, safety Sam Culbert, and linebacker John Offerdahl were the team captains. For the second consecutive year, Offerdahl received the team's most outstanding player award; he was also selected as the MAC defensive player of the year.

== Schedule ==
Date	Opponent	Site	Result	Attendance	Source
September 7	at Northern Illinois	Huskie Stadium; DeKalb, IL	L 0–17	21,362	
September 14	at Army*	Michie Stadium; West Point, NY	L 6–48	28,620	
September 28	at Michigan State*	Spartan Stadium; East Lansing, MI	L 3–7	63,829	
October 5	Bowling Green	Waldo Stadium; Kalamazoo, MI	L 7–48	12,000	
October 12	Central Michigan	Waldo Stadium; Kalamazoo, MI (rivalry)	L 17–24	18,072	
October 19	at Miami (OH)	Yager Stadium; Oxford, OH	T 10–10		
October 26	Ball State	Waldo Stadium; Kalamazoo, MI	W 34–0		
November 2	Toledo	Waldo Stadium; Kalamazoo, MI	W 18–13		
November 9	at Ohio	Peden Stadium; Athens, OH	L 15–21	12,900	
November 16	at Kent State	Dix Stadium; Kent, OH	W 34–3	3,579	
November 23	Eastern Michigan	Waldo Stadium; Kalamazoo, MI	W 38–21	3,405	
*Non-conference game
