= 1952 Michigan State Normal Hurons football team =

American college football season

1952 Michigan State Normal Hurons football
- Conference: Interstate Intercollegiate Athletic Conference
- Record: 5–3–1 (3–2–1 IIAC)
- Head coach: Fred Trosko (1st season)
- MVP: Chris Armelagos
- Captain: Chris Armelagos
- Home stadium: Briggs Field

1952 Interstate Intercollegiate Athletic Conference football standings
	Conf.					Overall
Team	W		L		T	W		L		T
Central Michigan $	6	–	0	–	0	7	–	2	–	0
Western Illinois	5	–	1	–	0	7	–	2	–	0
Michigan State Normal	3	–	2	–	1	5	–	3	–	1
Northern Illinois State	2	–	4	–	0	3	–	6	–	0
Southern Illinois	2	–	4	–	0	2	–	6	–	0
Illinois State Normal	1	–	4	–	1	1	–	6	–	2
Eastern Illinois	1	–	5	–	0	2	–	7	–	0
$ – Conference champion

The 1952 Michigan State Normal Hurons football team represented Michigan State Normal College (renamed Eastern Michigan College in 1956 and Eastern Michigan University in 1959) in the Interstate Intercollegiate Athletic Conference (IIAC) during the 1952 college football season. In their first season under head coach Fred Trosko, the Hurons compiled a 5–3–1 record (3–2–1 against IIAC opponents), finished in third place in the IIAC, and outscored their opponents, 154 to 146. The team was rated as the best team fielded by the school since 1945.

Lineman Christopher J. Armelagos was the team captain. He was also voted as the team's most valuable player. The team's statistical leaders included Bob Middlekauff with 540 yards of total offense, Ed Skowneski with 328 rushing yards, and Dick Moseley with seven touchdowns and 42 points. Chris Armelagos received the team's most valuable player award.

Trosko was hired as the school's head coach in July 1952. In 1951, he had coached Owosso High School to an undefeated and was named Michigan's high school coach of the year by the Detroit Free Press. He had previously played at the halfback position for the University of Michigan football team from 1937 to 1939. Trosko remained as the head football coach at Michigan State Normal/Eastern Michigan for 13 years through the 1964 season.

== Schedule ==
Date	Opponent	Site	Result	Attendance	Source
September 19	at Hope*	Holland, MI	W 13–6		
September 27	Ball State*	Briggs Field; Ypsilanti, MI	W 26–14		
October 4	Western Illinois	Briggs Field; Ypsilanti, MI	L 13–20		
October 11	Eastern Illinois	Briggs Field; Ypsilanti, MI	W 13–7		
October 18	Northern Illinois State^{†}	Briggs Field; Ypsilanti, MI	W 19–7		
October 25	at Central Michigan	Mount Pleasant, MI (rivalry)	L 7–26	6,500	
October 31	at Wayne*	University of Detroit Stadium; Detroit, MI	L 19–46	3,515	
November 7	at Illinois State Normal	McCormick Field; Normal, IL	T 14–14		
November 14	at Southern Illinois	McAndrew Stadium; Carbondale, IL	W 30–6		
*Non-conference game; ^{†}Homecoming
