= 1952 Central Michigan Chippewas football team =

American college football season

1952 Central Michigan Chippewas football

IIAC champion
- Conference: Interstate Intercollegiate Athletic Conference
- Record: 7–2 (6–0 IIAC)
- Head coach: Kenneth Kelly (2nd season)
- Home stadium: Alumni Field

1952 Interstate Intercollegiate Athletic Conference football standings
	Conf.					Overall
Team	W		L		T	W		L		T
Central Michigan $	6	–	0	–	0	7	–	2	–	0
Western Illinois	5	–	1	–	0	7	–	2	–	0
Michigan State Normal	3	–	2	–	1	5	–	3	–	1
Northern Illinois State	2	–	4	–	0	3	–	6	–	0
Southern Illinois	2	–	4	–	0	2	–	6	–	0
Illinois State Normal	1	–	4	–	1	1	–	6	–	2
Eastern Illinois	1	–	5	–	0	2	–	7	–	0
$ – Conference champion

The 1952 Central Michigan Chippewas football team represented Central Michigan College of Education, renamed Central Michigan University in 1959, in the Interstate Intercollegiate Athletic Conference (IIAC) during the 1952 college football season. In their second season under head coach Kenneth Kelly, the Chippewas compiled a 7–2 record (6–0 against IIAC opponents), won the IIAC championship, and outscored all opponents by a combined total of 285 to 85.

The team's statistical leaders included quarterback Don Koleber with 417 passing yards, fullback Vern Hawes with 540 rushing yards, and Al Droth with 302 receiving yards. Guard Loren Dietrich received the team's most valuable player award. Eight Central Michigan players (Dietrich, Hawes, center Bill Banaszak, tackle Ken Barron, halfback Dave Clark, halfback Bill Doser, guard Marty Klozik, and halfback Chuck Miller) received first-team honors on the All-IIAC team.

== Schedule ==
Date	Opponent	Site	Result	Attendance	Source
September 12	vs. St. Ambrose*	Saginaw, MI	W 38–14	9,000	
September 20	Bowling Green*	Alumni Field; Mount Pleasant, MI	L 7–20		
September 27	at Northern Illinois	Glidden Field; DeKalb, IL	W 56–7		
October 4	Western Michigan*	Alumni Field; Mount Pleasant, MI (rivalry)	L 0–18	3,500	
October 11	at Western Illinois	Hanson Field; Macomb, IL	W 27–0		
October 18	Southern Illinois	Alumni Field; Mount Pleasant, MI	W 55–7		
October 25	Michigan State Normal^{†}	Alumni Field; Mount Pleasant, MI (rivalry)	W 26–7	6,500	
November 1	Illinois State Normal	Alumni Field; Mount Pleasant, MI	W 35–12		
November 8	at Eastern Illinois	Lincoln Field; Charleston, IL	W 41–0		
*Non-conference game; ^{†}Homecoming
