= 1985 Eastern Michigan Hurons football team =

American college football season

1985 Eastern Michigan Hurons football
- Conference: Mid-American Conference
- Record: 4–7 (3–6 MAC)
- Head coach: Jim Harkema (3rd season)
- Captain: Game captains
- Home stadium: Rynearson Stadium

1985 Mid-American Conference football standings
	Conf.					Overall
Team	W		L		T	W		L		T
Bowling Green $	9	–	0	–	0	11	–	1	–	0
Miami (OH)	7	–	1	–	1	8	–	2	–	1
Central Michigan	6	–	3	–	0	7	–	3	–	0
Western Michigan	4	–	4	–	1	4	–	6	–	1
Northern Illinois	4	–	4	–	0	4	–	7	–	0
Ball State	3	–	6	–	0	4	–	7	–	0
Eastern Michigan	3	–	6	–	0	4	–	7	–	0
Toledo	3	–	6	–	0	4	–	7	–	0
Kent State	2	–	6	–	0	3	–	8	–	0
Ohio	2	–	7	–	0	2	–	9	–	0
$ – Conference champion

The 1985 Eastern Michigan Hurons football team represented Eastern Michigan University in the 1985 NCAA Division I-A football season. In their third season under head coach Jim Harkema, the Hurons compiled a 4–7 record (3–6 against conference opponents), finished in a tie for sixth place in the Mid-American Conference, and were outscored by their opponents, 252 to 188. The team's statistical leaders included Ron Adams with 977 passing yards, Gary Patton with 631 rushing yards, and Don Vesling with 354 receiving yards.

== Schedule ==
Date	Opponent	Site	Result	Attendance	Source
September 7	Youngstown State*	Rynearson Stadium; Ypsilanti, MI	W 27–22	13,702	
September 21	at Akron*	Rubber Bowl; Akron, OH	L 12–16	12,236	
September 28	at Kent State	Dix Stadium; Kent, OH	L 3–28	9,646	
October 5	Toledo	Rynearson Stadium; Ypsilanti, MI	W 21–10		
October 12	Bowling Green^{†}	Rynearson Stadium; Ypsilanti, MI	L 24–42	15,204	
October 19	at Ohio	Peden Stadium; Athens, OH	W 27–21		
October 26	at Central Michigan	Kelly/Shorts Stadium; Mount Pleasant, MI (rivalry)	L 10–17		
November 2	at Ball State	Ball State Stadium; Muncie, IN	W 27–24	10,530	
November 9	Northern Illinois	Rynearson Stadium; Ypsilanti, MI	L 0–3	2,000	
November 16	Miami (OH)	Rynearson Stadium; Ypsilanti, MI	L 16–31	3,000	
November 23	at Western Michigan	Waldo Stadium; Kalamazoo, MI	L 21–38	3,405	
*Non-conference game; ^{†}Homecoming
