= 1985 Ohio Bobcats football team =

American college football season

1985 Ohio Bobcats football
- Conference: Mid-American Conference
- Record: 2–9 (2–7 MAC)
- Head coach: Cleve Bryant (1st season)
- Offensive coordinator: Bob Wylie (1st season)
- Defensive coordinator: Tom Hollman (1st season)
- Home stadium: Peden Stadium

1985 Mid-American Conference football standings
| | Conf. | | | | | Overall |
| Team | W | | L | | T | W | | L | | T |
|---|---|---|---|---|---|---|---|---|---|---|
| Bowling Green $ | 9 | – | 0 | – | 0 | 11 | – | 1 | – | 0 |
| Miami (OH) | 7 | – | 1 | – | 1 | 8 | – | 2 | – | 1 |
| Central Michigan | 6 | – | 3 | – | 0 | 7 | – | 3 | – | 0 |
| Western Michigan | 4 | – | 4 | – | 1 | 4 | – | 6 | – | 1 |
| Northern Illinois | 4 | – | 4 | – | 0 | 4 | – | 7 | – | 0 |
| Ball State | 3 | – | 6 | – | 0 | 4 | – | 7 | – | 0 |
| Eastern Michigan | 3 | – | 6 | – | 0 | 4 | – | 7 | – | 0 |
| Toledo | 3 | – | 6 | – | 0 | 4 | – | 7 | – | 0 |
| Kent State | 2 | – | 6 | – | 0 | 3 | – | 8 | – | 0 |
| Ohio | 2 | – | 7 | – | 0 | 2 | – | 9 | – | 0 |
$ – Conference champion

The 1985 Ohio Bobcats football team was an American football team that represented Ohio University in the Mid-American Conference (MAC) during the 1985 NCAA Division I-A football season. In their first season under head coach Cleve Bryant, the Bobcats compiled a 2–9 record (2–7 against MAC opponents), finished in last place in the MAC, and were outscored by all opponents by a combined total of 305 to 181. They played their home games in Peden Stadium in Athens, Ohio.

== Schedule ==
| Date | Opponent | Site | Result | Attendance | Source |
|---|---|---|---|---|---|
| September 14 | at Marshall* | Fairfield Stadium; Huntington, WV (rivalry) | L 7–31 | 17,511 | |
| September 21 | at Duke* | Wallace Wade Stadium; Durham, NC | L 13–34 | 18,150 | |
| September 28 | Central Michigan | Peden Stadium; Athens, OH | L 7–13 | | |
| October 5 | at Miami (OH) | Yager Stadium; Oxford, OH (rivalry) | L 22–29 | 29,981 | |
| October 12 | Ball State | Peden Stadium; Athens, OH | L 23–36 | | |
| October 19 | Eastern Michigan | Peden Stadium; Athens, OH | L 21–27 | | |
| October 26 | at Toledo | Glass Bowl; Toledo, OH | L 10–24 | | |
| November 2 | at Kent State | Dix Stadium; Kent, OH | W 33–23 | 5,132 | |
| November 9 | Western Michigan | Peden Stadium; Athens, OH | W 21–15 | 12,900 | |
| November 16 | at Northern Illinois | Huskie Stadium; DeKalb, IL | L 7–35 | | |
| November 23 | Bowling Green | Peden Stadium; Athens, OH | L 17–38 | 6,782 | |
*Non-conference game
