= Hugh Sutherland =

Hugh Sutherland may refer to:

- Hugh Sutherland (American football), American football coach
- Hugh Sutherland (ice hockey) (1907–1990), Canadian ice hockey player
- Hugh McKay Sutherland (1843–1926), Canadian politician, lumber merchant and railway promotor
