= William O'Brien (American football) =

American football player, coach, and official (1923–2000)

Biographical details
- Born: March 11, 1923; Schulter, Oklahoma, U.S.
- Died: December 1, 2000 (aged 77); Energy, Illinois, U.S.

Playing career

Football
- 1941–1942: Southern Illinois

Baseball
- 1947: Southern Illinois

Coaching career (HC unless noted)

Football
- 1952–1954: Southern Illinois

Baseball
- 1952: Southern Illinois (assistant)

Head coaching record
- Overall: 6–20

William Edward O'Brien (March 11, 1923 – December 1, 2000) was an American football coach and official. He was the seventh head football coach at the Southern Illinois University Carbondale, serving for three seasons, from 1952 to 1954, and compiling a record of 6–20. O'Brien was an official in the National Football League (NFL) for 18 seasons, from 1967 through 1983, officiating in Super Bowl X in 1976. He wore number 83 for the major part of his NFL career. He was also a professor at Southern Illinois University.

O'Brien was born on March 11, 1923, in Schulter, Oklahoma. He graduated in 1941 from Zeigler High School in Zeigler, Illinois. O'Brien served in the United States Marine Corps during World War II and the Korean War, retiring as a colonel in 1983. He died on December 1, 2000, at Cardinal Health Care in Energy, Illinois, after battling Alzheimer's disease for 13 years.

== Head coaching record ==
| Year | Team | Overall | Conference | Standing | Bowl/playoffs |
|---|---|---|---|---|---|
Southern Illinois Salukis (Interstate Intercollegiate Athletic Conference) (1952–1954)
| 1952 | Southern Illinois | 2–6 | 2–4 | T–4th | |
| 1953 | Southern Illinois | 2–7 | 2–4 | 5th | |
| 1954 | Southern Illinois | 2–7 | 1–5 | T–6th | |
| Southern Illinois: | | 6–20 | 5–13 | | |
| Total: | | 6–20 | | | |
