= 1968 Milwaukee Panthers football team =

American college football season

1968 Milwaukee Panthers football
- Conference: Independent
- Record: 2–7
- Head coach: Wally Dreyer (9th season)
- Home stadium: Shorewood Stadium; Milwaukee County Stadium

1968 NCAA College Division independents football records
	Conf.			Overall
Team	W	L	T	W		L		T
No. 2 San Diego State		–		9	–	0	–	1
No. 3 Chattanooga		–		9	–	1	–	0
Indiana State		–		9	–	1	–	0
Indiana (PA)		–		9	–	1	–	0
Nevada Southern		–		8	–	1	–	0
Ashland		–		8	–	2	–	0
No. 7 Eastern Michigan		–		8	–	2	–	0
Lincoln (MO)		–		8	–	2	–	0
St. Norbert		–		6	–	2	–	1
Tennessee State		–		6	–	2	–	1
UC Riverside		–		6	–	2	–	1
Hawaii		–		7	–	3	–	0
No. 14 Tampa		–		7	–	3	–	0
No. 17 Akron		–		7	–	3	–	1
Northeastern		–		6	–	3	–	0
Southern Illinois		–		6	–	3	–	0
Cortland		–		5	–	3	–	0
Boston University		–		5	–	3	–	1
Northern Arizona		–		6	–	4	–	0
Pacific (CA)		–		6	–	4	–	0
Samford		–		6	–	4	–	0
Northern Michigan		–		5	–	4	–	0
Parsons		–		5	–	4	–	0
Wheaton (IL)		–		5	–	4	–	0
Drake		–		5	–	5	–	0
UC Santa Barbara		–		4	–	4	–	1
Santa Clara		–		4	–	5	–	0
Portland State		–		4	–	6	–	0
Illinois College		–		2	–	4	–	2
Wayne State (MI)		–		3	–	6	–	0
Wabash		–		3	–	6	–	0
Colorado College		–		2	–	6	–	0
Kentucky State		–		2	–	7	–	0
Milwaukee		–		2	–	7	–	0
Lake Forest		–		2	–	8	–	0
Northern Illinois		–		2	–	8	–	0
Mississippi Valley State		–		1	–	7	–	0
UC San Diego		–		0	–	7	–	0
Rose Poly		–		0	–	8	–	0
Cal Poly Pomona		–		0	–	10	–	0
Rankings from AP small college poll

The 1968 Milwaukee Panthers football team represented the University of Wisconsin–Milwaukee as an independent during the 1968 NCAA College Division football season. Led by Wally Dreyer in his ninth season as head coach, Milwaukee compiled a record of 2–7. The Panthers offense scored 105 points while the defense allowed 208 points.

== Schedule ==
Date	Opponent	Site	Result	Attendance	Source
September 14	Illinois State	Shorewood Stadium; Shorewood, WI	L 14–34	4,000	
September 21	at Eastern Illinois	Lincoln Field; Charleston, IL	L 14–15	5,000	
September 28	at Baldwin–Wallace	Ray E. Watts Stadium; Berea, OH	L 8–48	8,524	
October 5	Western Illinois	Shorewood Stadium; Shorewood, WI	L 12–13	4,000	
October 12	Missouri–Rolla	Shorewood Stadium; Shorewood, WI	L 6–10	3,000	
October 19	Chicago Circle	Milwaukee County Stadium; Milwaukee, WI	L 3–19	7,129	
October 26	at Quantico Marines	Butler Stadium; Quantico, VA	L 12–41	3,200	
November 2	St. Norbert	Shorewood Stadium; Shorewood, WI	W 14–7	3,500	
November 9	at Bradley	Peoria Stadium; Peoria, IL	W 22–21	3,000	
