= 1952 Illinois State Normal Redbirds football team =

American college football season

1952 Illinois State Normal Redbirds football
- Conference: Interstate Intercollegiate Athletic Conference
- Record: 1–6–2 (1–4–1 IIAC)
- Head coach: Edwin Struck (8th season)
- MVP: Wes Bair
- Captains: George Egofske; Dorian Smith
- Home stadium: McCormick Field

1952 Interstate Intercollegiate Athletic Conference football standings
	Conf.					Overall
Team	W		L		T	W		L		T
Central Michigan $	6	–	0	–	0	7	–	2	–	0
Western Illinois	5	–	1	–	0	7	–	2	–	0
Michigan State Normal	3	–	2	–	1	5	–	3	–	1
Northern Illinois State	2	–	4	–	0	3	–	6	–	0
Southern Illinois	2	–	4	–	0	2	–	6	–	0
Illinois State Normal	1	–	4	–	1	1	–	6	–	2
Eastern Illinois	1	–	5	–	0	2	–	7	–	0
$ – Conference champion

The 1952 Illinois State Normal Redbirds football team represented Illinois State Normal University—now known as Illinois State University—as a member of the Interstate Intercollegiate Athletic Conference (IIAC) during the 1952 college football season. Led by eighth-year head coach Edwin Struck, the Redbirds compiled an overall record of 1–6–2 with a mark of 1–4–1 in conference play, placing sixth in the IIAC. Illinois State Normal played home games at McCormick Field in Normal, Illinois.

Sophomore quarterback Wes Bair completed 136 passes during the season, breaking the small college record for most passes completed in a single season.

== Schedule ==
Date	Opponent	Site	Result	Attendance	Source
September 20	at Indiana State*	Memorial Stadium; Terre Haute, IN	L 7–33		
September 27	Scott Field*	McCormick Field; Normal, IL	L 20–32		
October 4	at Southern Illinois	McAndrew Stadium; Carbondale, IL	L 20–27		
October 11	Illinois Wesleyan*	McCormick Field; Normal, IL	T 14–14		
October 18	Western Illinois^{†}	McCormick Field; Normal, IL	L 7–20	6,500	
October 25	Northern Illinois State	McCormick Field; Normal, IL	L 20–28		
November 1	at Central Michigan	Alumni Field; Mount Pleasant, MI	L 12–35		
November 8	Michigan State Normal	McCormick Field; Normal, IL	T 14–14		
November 15	at Eastern Illinois	Lincoln Field; Charleston, IL (rivalry)	W 27–26		
*Non-conference game; ^{†}Homecoming
