= Michigan MAC Trophy =

Three-way American sports rivalry

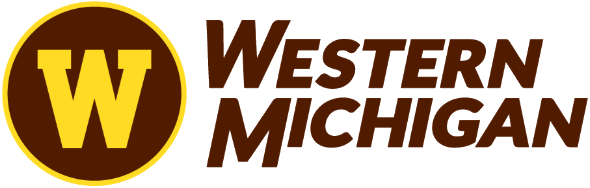
Central; Michigan; Chippewas	Eastern; Michigan; Eagles	Western; Michigan; Broncos
- Football
- Originated: 2005
- Current holder: Western Michigan
Central; Michigan (6); 2006 2009; 2010 2013; 2017 2021	Eastern Michigan (5); 2007 2008; 2011 2012; 2022	Western Michigan (11); 2005 2014; 2015 2016; 2018 2019; 2020 2023; 2024 2025; 2026
- Men's Basketball
- Originated: 2006
- Current holder: Western Michigan
Central; Michigan (7); 2010 2012; 2015 2016; 2019 2024; 2025	Eastern Michigan (5); 2017 2018; 2020 2022; 2023	Western Michigan (9); 2006 2007; 2008 2009; 2011 2013; 2014 2021 2026

Locations of CMU, EMU, and WMU

The Michigan MAC Trophy is given to the Mid-American Conference (MAC) university from Michigan – Central Michigan University (CMU), Eastern Michigan University (EMU) and Western Michigan University (WMU) – which has the best head-to-head record in each season of each sport. There are two separate trophies, one for football and the other for men's basketball. It is one of a handful of trophies in college sports contested among three teams; others are the Commander-in-Chief's Trophy and the irregularly awarded Florida Cup and Beehive Boot.

In the event of a tie the Michigan MAC Trophy remains with the previous holder until one of the other rivals claims the title.

Western Michigan has won the most total trophies with 20, 9 in basketball and 11 in football. They currently hold both trophies.

== History ==
The Michigan MAC Trophy was created in 2005 by the Michigan Sports Hall of Fame. There are two trophies, one given to the winner of the football series and the other to the winner of the men's basketball series. CMU, EMU and WMU have been competing together in the MAC since 1974 (although WMU joined the MAC in 1948).

Central Michigan won the football trophy in 2009 after Eastern Michigan won the previous two. The football trophy was won by all three schools in the trophy's first three years of existence. WMU won the first four basketball trophies before CMU won in 2010.

Western Michigan University claimed the inaugural Michigan MAC Trophy for each sport. Western Michigan also has the most trophies with 20, 11 in football and 9 in basketball.

== Results ==
Central Michigan victories	Eastern Michigan victories	Western Michigan victories	Tied series

* Tie; retained trophy

=== Football ===
Year	Winner	Summary	CMU vs. EMU	CMU vs. WMU	EMU vs. WMU	References
2005	Western Michigan	WMU 2–0, EMU 1–1, CMU 0–2	EMU 23–20 (OT)	WMU 31–24	WMU 44–36	
2006	Central Michigan	CMU 2–0, WMU 1–1, EMU 0–2	CMU 24–17 (OT)	CMU 31–7	WMU 18–15	
2007	Eastern Michigan	EMU 2–0, CMU 1–1, WMU 0–2	EMU 48–45	CMU 34–31	EMU 19–2	
2008	Eastern Michigan *	CMU 1–1, EMU 1–1, WMU 1–1	EMU 56–52	CMU 38–28	WMU 31–10	
2009	Central Michigan	CMU 2–0, WMU 1–1, EMU 0–2	CMU 56–8	CMU 34–23	WMU 35–14	
2010	Central Michigan	CMU 2–0, WMU 1–1, EMU 0–2	CMU 52–14	CMU 26–22	WMU 45–30	
2011	Eastern Michigan	EMU 2–0, WMU 1–1, CMU 0–2	EMU 35–28	WMU 44–14	EMU 14–10	
2012	Eastern Michigan *	CMU 1–1, EMU 1–1, WMU 1–1	CMU 34–31	WMU 42–31	EMU 29–23	
2013	Central Michigan	CMU 2–0, EMU 1–1, WMU 0–2	CMU 42–10	CMU 27–22	EMU 35–32 (OT)	
2014	Western Michigan	WMU 2–0, CMU 1–1, EMU 0–2	CMU 38–7	WMU 32–20	WMU 51–7	
2015	Western Michigan	WMU 2–0, CMU 1–1, EMU 0–2	CMU 35–28	WMU 41–39	WMU 58–28	
2016	Western Michigan	WMU 2–0, EMU 1–1, CMU 0–2	EMU 26–21	WMU 49–10	WMU 45–31	
2017	Central Michigan	CMU 2–0, WMU 1–1, EMU 0–2	CMU 42–30	CMU 35–28	WMU 20–17 (OT)	
2018	Western Michigan	WMU 2–0, EMU 1–1, CMU 0–2	EMU 17–7	WMU 35–10	WMU 27–24	
2019	Western Michigan *	CMU 1–1, EMU 1–1, WMU 1–1	CMU 42–16	WMU 31–15	EMU 34–27	
2020	Western Michigan *	CMU 1–1, EMU 1–1, WMU 1–1	CMU 31–23	WMU 52–44	EMU 53–42	
2021	Central Michigan	CMU 2–0, EMU 1–1, WMU 0–2	CMU 31–10	CMU 42–30	EMU 22–21	
2022	Eastern Michigan	EMU 2–0, WMU 1–1, CMU 0–2	EMU 38–19	WMU 12–10	EMU 45–23	
2023	Western Michigan	WMU 2–0, CMU 1–1 EMU 0–2	CMU 26–23	WMU 38–28	WMU 45–21	
2024	Western Michigan *	CMU 1–1, EMU 1–1, WMU 1–1	EMU 38–34	CMU 16–14	WMU 26–18	
2025	Western Michigan	WMU 2–0, CMU 1–1, EMU 0–2	CMU 24–13	WMU 24–21	WMU 31–21	
2026	Western Michigan	WMU 2–0, CMU 1–1, EMU 0–2	CMU 35–7	WMU 21–14	WMU 34–27	

=== Men's basketball ===
Year	Winner	Summary	CMU vs. EMU	CMU vs. WMU	EMU vs. WMU	References
2006	Western Michigan	WMU 4–0, EMU 2–2, CMU 0–4	EMU 81–75; EMU 80–69	WMU 75–71; WMU 68–57	WMU 68–62; WMU 67–64	
2007	Western Michigan	WMU 3–1, CMU 2–2, EMU 1–3	CMU 74–68; EMU 87–83 (OT)	WMU 86–76; CMU 71–66	WMU 84–80; WMU 80–61	
2008	Western Michigan *	CMU 2–2, EMU 2–2, WMU 2–2	CMU 62–53; EMU 67–64	WMU 72–52; CMU 72–68	EMU 81–71; WMU 70–52	
2009	Western Michigan	WMU 3–1, EMU 2–2, CMU 1–3	EMU 84–77 (2OT); EMU 57–56	WMU 72–63; CMU 71–68	WMU 53–45; WMU 46–38	
2010	Central Michigan	CMU 3–1, WMU 2–2, EMU 1–3	CMU 71–63; CMU 56–55	WMU 70–61; CMU 74–66	WMU 61–47; EMU 66–52	
2011	Western Michigan	WMU 4–0, CMU 1–3, EMU 1–3	EMU 41–38; CMU 66–60	WMU 63–56; WMU 81–68	WMU 65–48; WMU 87–60	
2012	Central Michigan	CMU 3–1, EMU 2–2, WMU 1–3	CMU 60–56; CMU 55–52	WMU 64–61; CMU 76–70	EMU 62–59 (OT); EMU 54–53	
2013	Western Michigan	WMU 3–1, EMU 2–2, CMU 1–3	EMU 58–52; CMU 61–59	WMU 76–59; WMU 71–68	WMU 63–59; EMU 50–49 (OT)	
2014	Western Michigan *	EMU 3–1, WMU 3–1, CMU 0–4	EMU 72–59; EMU 64–42	WMU 75–72; WMU 76–64	EMU 56–37; WMU 75–67	
2015	Central Michigan	CMU 3–1, WMU 2–2, EMU 1–3	CMU 65–51; CMU 72–56	CMU 70–65; WMU 74–62	EMU 69–63; WMU 80–72	
2016	Central Michigan *	EMU 3–1, WMU 3–1, CMU 0–4	EMU 99–80; EMU 71–56	WMU 92–85; WMU 91–82 (OT)	WMU 94–86; EMU 74–63	
2017	Eastern Michigan	EMU 3–1, WMU 2–2, CMU 1–3	EMU 85–63; EMU 109–81	CMU 86–82; WMU 88-80	EMU 86–80; WMU 88–80	
2018	Eastern Michigan	EMU 3–1, WMU 2–2, CMU 1–3	EMU 79–74; EMU 72–67	WMU 83–81 (OT); CMU 84–71	WMU 71–57; EMU 74-58	
2019	Central Michigan	CMU 4–0, EMU 2–2, WMU 0–4	CMU 86–82; CMU 77–66	CMU 85–64; CMU 82–75	EMU 93–67; EMU 77–76	
2020	Eastern Michigan	EMU 3–1, CMU 2–2, WMU 1–3	EMU 73–70; EMU 67–63	CMU 85–78; CMU 85–68	EMU 69–51; WMU 70–54	
2021	Western Michigan	WMU 2–1, CMU 2–2, EMU 1–2	CMU 87–60; CMU 75–64	WMU 76–61; WMU 67–65	EMU 64–63	
2022	Eastern Michigan	EMU 3–1, WMU 2–2, CMU 1–3	EMU 99–68; EMU 75–70	CMU 65–55; WMU 77–63	EMU 85–79; WMU 71–60	
2023	Eastern Michigan	EMU 2–1, WMU 2–2, CMU 1–2	EMU 62–56	CMU 70–69; WMU 81–65	WMU 85–79; EMU 66–59	
2024	Central Michigan	CMU 4–0, EMU 1–3, WMU 1–3	CMU 80–64; CMU 65–62 (OT)	CMU 62–55; CMU 69–42	WMU 73–56; EMU 70–67	
2025	Central Michigan	CMU 3–1, WMU 1–2, EMU 1–2	CMU 82–63; EMU 84–73	CMU 73–52; CMU 86–57	WMU 61–54	
2026	Western Michigan	WMU 3–1, CMU 2–2, EMU 1–3	CMU 100–65; EMU 66–54	WMU 77–65; CMU 83–70	WMU 79–62; WMU 76–62	
2027	TBD	WMU 0-0, CMU 0-0, EMU 0-0	Dec 12; Feb 9	Jan 23; Feb 27	Jan 5 Jan 30	

== Total trophies ==
University	Football trophies	Basketball trophies	Total trophies
Western Michigan	11	9	20
Central Michigan	6	7	13
Eastern Michigan	5	5	10

== Total records ==
=== Football ===
University	W	L	PCT
Western Michigan	27	17	.605
Central Michigan	23	21	.523
Eastern Michigan	16	28	.372

=== Men's basketball ===
University	W	L	PCT
Western Michigan	43	33	.566
Eastern Michigan	38	35	.521
Central Michigan	32	44	.421

== See also ==
- Central Michigan–Western Michigan football rivalry
- Central Michigan–Eastern Michigan football rivalry
