= 1985 Bowling Green Falcons football team =

American college football season

1985 Bowling Green Falcons football

MAC champion

California Bowl, L 7–51 vs. Fresno State
- Conference: Mid-American Conference
- Record: 11–1 (9–0 MAC)
- Head coach: Denny Stolz (9th season)
- Home stadium: Doyt Perry Stadium

1985 Mid-American Conference football standings
	Conf.					Overall
Team	W		L		T	W		L		T
Bowling Green $	9	–	0	–	0	11	–	1	–	0
Miami (OH)	7	–	1	–	1	8	–	2	–	1
Central Michigan	6	–	3	–	0	7	–	3	–	0
Western Michigan	4	–	4	–	1	4	–	6	–	1
Northern Illinois	4	–	4	–	0	4	–	7	–	0
Ball State	3	–	6	–	0	4	–	7	–	0
Eastern Michigan	3	–	6	–	0	4	–	7	–	0
Toledo	3	–	6	–	0	4	–	7	–	0
Kent State	2	–	6	–	0	3	–	8	–	0
Ohio	2	–	7	–	0	2	–	9	–	0
$ – Conference champion

The 1985 Bowling Green Falcons football team was an American football team that represented Bowling Green University in the Mid-American Conference (MAC) during the 1985 NCAA Division I-A football season. In their ninth season under head coach Denny Stolz, the Falcons compiled an 11–1 record (9–0 against MAC opponents), won the MAC championship, lost to Fresno State by a 51–7 score in the 1985 California Bowl, and outscored their opponents by a combined total of 355 to 223.

The team's statistical leaders included Brian McClure with 2,674 passing yards, Bernard White with 949 rushing yards, and Stan Hunter with 761 receiving yards.

== Schedule ==
Date	Opponent	Rank	Site	Result	Attendance	Source
September 7	at Ball State		Ball State Stadium; Muncie, IN	W 31–6	10,201	
September 14	at Kentucky*		Commonwealth Stadium; Lexington, KY	W 30–26	57,620	
September 21	Miami (OH)		Doyt Perry Stadium; Bowling Green, OH	W 28–24	23,500	
September 28	Akron*		Doyt Perry Stadium; Bowling Green, OH	W 27–22	25,000	
October 5	at Western Michigan		Waldo Stadium; Kalamazoo, MI	W 48–7	12,000	
October 12	at Eastern Michigan		Rynearson Stadium; Ypsilanti, MI	W 42–24	15,204	
October 19	Central Michigan		Doyt Perry Stadium; Bowling Green, OH	W 23–18	16,500	
October 26	Kent State		Doyt Perry Stadium; Bowling Green, OH (Anniversary Award)	W 26–14		
November 2	at Northern Illinois		Huskie Stadium; DeKalb, IL	W 34–14	22,600	
November 16	Toledo		Doyt Perry Stadium; Bowling Green, OH (rivalry)	W 21–0	28,110	
November 23	at Ohio		Peden Stadium; Athens, OH	W 38–17	6,782	
December 14	at Fresno State*	No. 20	Bulldog Stadium; Fresno, CA (California Bowl)	L 7–51	32,554	
*Non-conference game; Rankings from AP Poll released prior to the game
