= 1985 Kent State Golden Flashes football team =

American college football season

1985 Kent State Golden Flashes football
- Conference: Mid-American Conference
- Record: 3–8 (2–6 MAC)
- Head coach: Dick Scesniak (3rd season)
- Home stadium: Dix Stadium

1985 Mid-American Conference football standings
	Conf.					Overall
Team	W		L		T	W		L		T
Bowling Green $	9	–	0	–	0	11	–	1	–	0
Miami (OH)	7	–	1	–	1	8	–	2	–	1
Central Michigan	6	–	3	–	0	7	–	3	–	0
Western Michigan	4	–	4	–	1	4	–	6	–	1
Northern Illinois	4	–	4	–	0	4	–	7	–	0
Ball State	3	–	6	–	0	4	–	7	–	0
Eastern Michigan	3	–	6	–	0	4	–	7	–	0
Toledo	3	–	6	–	0	4	–	7	–	0
Kent State	2	–	6	–	0	3	–	8	–	0
Ohio	2	–	7	–	0	2	–	9	–	0
$ – Conference champion

The 1985 Kent State Golden Flashes football team was an American football team that represented Kent State University in the Mid-American Conference (MAC) during the 1985 NCAA Division I-A football season. In their third season under head coach Dick Scesniak, the Golden Flashes compiled a 3–8 record (2–6 against MAC opponents), finished in ninth place in the MAC, and were outscored by all opponents by a combined total of 277 to 212.

The team's statistical leaders included Eric Wilkerson with 594 rushing yards, Steve Poth with 1,221 passing yards, and Jim Kilbane with 806 receiving yards. Two Kent State players were selected as first-team All-MAC players: defensive lineman Lee Bullington and wide receiver Jim Kilbane.

== Schedule ==
Date	Opponent	Site	Result	Attendance	Source
September 14	at Akron*	Rubber Bowl; Akron, OH (Wagon Wheel)	L 0–24	32,183	
September 21	at Syracuse*	Carrier Dome; Syracuse, NY	L 0–34	29,822	
September 28	Eastern Michigan	Dix Stadium; Kent, OH	W 28–3	9,646	
October 5	at Central Michigan	Kelly/Shorts Stadium; Mount Pleasant, MI	L 17–21	18,463	
October 12	UTEP*	Dix Stadium; Kent, OH	W 51–24	10,329	
October 19	Ball State	Dix Stadium; Kent, OH	W 45–16	9,519	
October 26	at Bowling Green	Doyt Perry Stadium; Bowling Green, OH (Anniversary Award)	L 14–26		
November 2	Ohio	Dix Stadium; Kent, OH	L 23–33	5,132	
November 9	at Miami (OH)	Yager Stadium; Oxford, OH	L 24–52		
November 16	Western Michigan	Dix Stadium; Kent, OH	L 3–34	3,579	
November 23	at Toledo	Glass Bowl; Toledo, OH	L 7–10	11,177	
*Non-conference game
