= 1952 Western Illinois Leathernecks football team =

American college football season

1952 Western Illinois Leathernecks football
- Conference: Interstate Intercollegiate Athletic Conference
- Record: 7–2 (5–1 IIAC)
- Head coach: Vince DiFrancesca (4th season)
- Home stadium: Hanson Field

1952 Interstate Intercollegiate Athletic Conference football standings
	Conf.					Overall
Team	W		L		T	W		L		T
Central Michigan $	6	–	0	–	0	7	–	2	–	0
Western Illinois	5	–	1	–	0	7	–	2	–	0
Michigan State Normal	3	–	2	–	1	5	–	3	–	1
Northern Illinois State	2	–	4	–	0	3	–	6	–	0
Southern Illinois	2	–	4	–	0	2	–	6	–	0
Illinois State Normal	1	–	4	–	1	1	–	6	–	2
Eastern Illinois	1	–	5	–	0	2	–	7	–	0
$ – Conference champion

The 1952 Western Illinois Leathernecks football team represented Western Illinois University as a member of the Interstate Intercollegiate Athletic Conference (IIAC) during the 1952 college football season. They were led by fourth-year head coach Vince DiFrancesca and played their home games at Hanson Field. The Leathernecks finished the season with a 7–2 record overall and a 5–1 record in conference play, placing second in the IIAC.

== Schedule ==
Date	Opponent	Site	Result	Attendance	Source
September 20	at Whitewater State*	Whitewater, WI	W 10–0		
September 26	Northeast Missouri State*	Kirksville, MO	L 0–19		
October 4	at Michigan State Normal	Briggs Field; Ypsilanti, MI	W 20–13		
October 11	Central Michigan	Hanson Field; Macomb, IL	L 0–27		
October 18	at Illinois State Normal	McCormick Field; Normal, IL	W 20–7	6,500	
October 23	at St. Ambrose*	Hanson Field; Macomb, IL	W 46–0		
November 1	Eastern Illinois^{†}	Hanson Field; Macomb, IL	W 7–6	6,000	
November 7	at Southern Illinois	McAndrew Stadium; Carbondale, IL	W 38–7		
November 15	Northern Illinois State	Hanson Field; Macomb, IL	W 39–14		
*Non-conference game; ^{†}Homecoming
