= 1967 Eastern Illinois Panthers football team =

American college football season

1967 Eastern Illinois Panthers football
- Conference: Interstate Intercollegiate Athletic Conference
- Record: 2–6–1 (1–2 IIAC)
- Head coach: Clyde Biggers (3rd season)
- Home stadium: Lincoln Field

1967 Interstate Intercollegiate Athletic Conference football standings
	Conf.					Overall
Team	W		L		T	W		L		T
Central Michigan +	2	–	1	–	0	8	–	2	–	0
Illinois State +	2	–	1	–	0	8	–	2	–	0
Eastern Illinois	1	–	2	–	0	2	–	6	–	1
Western Illinois	1	–	2	–	0	2	–	6	–	0
+ – Conference co-champions

The 1967 Eastern Illinois Panthers football team represented Eastern Illinois University as a member of the Interstate Intercollegiate Athletic Conference (IIAC) during the 1967 NCAA College Division football season. The team was led by third-year head coach Clyde Biggers and played their home games at Lincoln Field in Charleston, Illinois. The Panthers finished the season with a 2–6–1 record overall and a 1–2 record in conference play.

== Schedule ==
Date	Opponent	Site	Result	Attendance	Source
September 16	at Indiana State*	Memorial Stadium; Terre Haute, IN	L 6–41	11,000	
September 23	at Milwaukee*	Shorewood Stadium; Shorewood, WI	L 6–30	4,000–4,500	
September 30	Eastern Michigan*	Lincoln Field; Charleston, IL	L 12–28	4,500–5,000	
October 7	at Central Michigan	Alumni Field; Mount Pleasant, MI	L 0–21	5,000	
October 14	Illinois State	Lincoln Field; Charleston, IL (rivalry)	L 6–28	4,000	
October 21	at Bradley*	Peoria Stadium; Peoria, IL	L 12–20	4,000	
October 28	Western Illinois^{†}	Lincoln Field; Charleston, IL	W 12–7	5,500	
November 4	at Chicago Circle*	Hanson Park; Chicago, IL	T 6–6	200	
November 11	Wayne State*	Lincoln Field; Charleston, IL	W 20–14	2,000	
*Non-conference game; ^{†}Homecoming
