= 1967 Illinois State Redbirds football team =

American college football season

1967 Illinois State Redbirds football

IIAC co-champion
- Conference: Interstate Intercollegiate Athletic Conference
- Record: 8–2 (2–1 IIAC)
- Head coach: Larry Bitcon (3rd season)
- MVP: Mike Phillips
- Captains: Mike Phillips; Dick Zimmerman
- Home stadium: Hancock Stadium

1967 Interstate Intercollegiate Athletic Conference football standings
	Conf.					Overall
Team	W		L		T	W		L		T
Central Michigan +	2	–	1	–	0	8	–	2	–	0
Illinois State +	2	–	1	–	0	8	–	2	–	0
Eastern Illinois	1	–	2	–	0	2	–	6	–	1
Western Illinois	1	–	2	–	0	2	–	6	–	0
+ – Conference co-champions

The 1967 Illinois State Redbirds football team represented Illinois State University as a member of the Interstate Intercollegiate Athletic Conference (IIAC) during the 1967 NCAA College Division football season. Led by third-year head coach Larry Bitcon, the Redbirds compiled an overall record of 8–2 with a mark of 2–1 in conference play, sharing the IIAC title with Central Michigan. Illinois State played home games at Hancock Stadium in Normal, Illinois.

== Schedule ==
Date	Opponent	Site	Result	Attendance	Source
September 16	Milwaukee*	Hancock Stadium; Normal, IL	W 21–0	6,000	
September 23	at Illinois Wesleyan*	Bloomington, IL	W 27–7	8,000	
September 30	at Chicago Circle*	Winnemac Park; Chicago, IL	W 16–14		
October 7	Central Missouri State*	Hancock Stadium; Normal, IL	W 27–0	8,500	
October 14	at Eastern Illinois	Charleston, IL (rivalry)	W 28–6	4,000	
October 21	at Western Illinois	Hanson Field; Macomb, IL	W 21–17	12,700	
October 28	Central Michigan^{†}	Hancock Stadium; Normal, IL	L 14–19	18,000	
November 4	Winona State*	Hancock Stadium; Normal, IL	W 41–7	5,500	
November 11	Mankato State*	Hancock Stadium; Normal, IL	W 30–14	10,000	
November 18	at Bradley*	Richwood Stadium; Peoria, IL	L 0–14		
*Non-conference game; ^{†}Homecoming
