= 1985 Toledo Rockets football team =

American college football season

1985 Toledo Rockets football
- Conference: Mid-American Conference
- Record: 4–7 (3–6 MAC)
- Head coach: Dan Simrell (4th season)
- Home stadium: Glass Bowl

1985 Mid-American Conference football standings
	Conf.					Overall
Team	W		L		T	W		L		T
Bowling Green $	9	–	0	–	0	11	–	1	–	0
Miami (OH)	7	–	1	–	1	8	–	2	–	1
Central Michigan	6	–	3	–	0	7	–	3	–	0
Western Michigan	4	–	4	–	1	4	–	6	–	1
Northern Illinois	4	–	4	–	0	4	–	7	–	0
Ball State	3	–	6	–	0	4	–	7	–	0
Eastern Michigan	3	–	6	–	0	4	–	7	–	0
Toledo	3	–	6	–	0	4	–	7	–	0
Kent State	2	–	6	–	0	3	–	8	–	0
Ohio	2	–	7	–	0	2	–	9	–	0
$ – Conference champion

The 1985 Toledo Rockets football team was an American football team that represented the University of Toledo in the Mid-American Conference (MAC) during the 1985 NCAA Division I-A football season. In their fourth season under head coach Dan Simrell, the Rockets compiled a 4–7 record (3–6 against MAC opponents), finished in a tie for sixth place in the MAC, and were outscored by all opponents by a combined total of 187 to 135.

The team's statistical leaders included A. J. Sager with 1,335 passing yards, Kelvin Farmer with 748 rushing yards, and Jay Walsh with 284 receiving yards.

== Schedule ==
Date	Opponent	Site	Result	Attendance	Source
September 7	at Arizona*	Arizona Stadium; Tucson, AZ	L 10–23	44,691	
September 21	at Wichita State*	Cessna Stadium; Wichita, KS	W 22–15	18,165	
September 28	Ball State	Glass Bowl; Toledo, OH	L 19–23	23,671	
October 5	at Eastern Michigan	Rynearson Stadium; Ypsilanti, MI	L 10–21		
October 12	Miami (OH)	Glass Bowl; Toledo, OH	L 14–26		
October 19	at Northern Illinois	Huskie Stadium; DeKalb, IL	L 3–16	26,420	
October 26	Ohio	Glass Bowl; Toledo, OH	W 24–10		
November 2	at Western Michigan	Waldo Stadium; Kalamazoo, MI	L 13–18		
November 9	Central Michigan	Glass Bowl; Toledo, OH	W 10–7		
November 16	at Bowling Green	Doyt Perry Stadium; Bowling Green, OH (rivalry)	L 0–21	28,110	
November 23	Kent State	Glass Bowl; Toledo, OH	W 10–7	11,177	
*Non-conference game

== After the season ==
=== NFL draft ===
The following Rocket was selected in the 1986 NFL draft following the season.

Round	Pick	Player	Position	NFL club
7	192	Brent Williams	Defensive end	New England Patriots
