= 1952 Eastern Illinois Panthers football team =

American college football season

1952 Eastern Illinois Panthers football
- Conference: Interstate Intercollegiate Athletic Conference
- Record: 2–7 (1–5 IIAC)
- Head coach: Maynard O'Brien (6th season)
- Home stadium: Lincoln Field

1952 Interstate Intercollegiate Athletic Conference football standings
	Conf.					Overall
Team	W		L		T	W		L		T
Central Michigan $	6	–	0	–	0	7	–	2	–	0
Western Illinois	5	–	1	–	0	7	–	2	–	0
Michigan State Normal	3	–	2	–	1	5	–	3	–	1
Northern Illinois State	2	–	4	–	0	3	–	6	–	0
Southern Illinois	2	–	4	–	0	2	–	6	–	0
Illinois State Normal	1	–	4	–	1	1	–	6	–	2
Eastern Illinois	1	–	5	–	0	2	–	7	–	0
$ – Conference champion

The 1952 Eastern Illinois Panthers football team represented Eastern Illinois State College (now known as Eastern Illinois University) as a member of the Interstate Intercollegiate Athletic Conference (IIAC) during the 1952 college football season. The team was led by sixth-year head coach Maynard O'Brien and played their home games at Lincoln Field in Charleston, Illinois. The Panthers finished the season with a 2–7 record overall and a 1–5 record in conference play, finishing last in the IIAC.

== Schedule ==
Date	Opponent	Site	Result	Attendance	Source
September 27	Millikin*	Lincoln Field; Charleston, IL	W 28–19		
October 4	at Scott Field*	Belleville, IL	L 13–18		
October 11	at Michigan State Normal	Briggs Field; Ypsilanti, MI	L 7–13		
October 18	at Northwest Missouri State*	Maryville, MO	L 19–27		
October 25	Southern Illinois^{†}	Lincoln Field; Charleston, IL	L 7–22		
November 1	at Western Illinois	Hanson Field; Macomb, IL	L 6–7	6,000	
November 8	Central Michigan	Lincoln Field; Charleston, IL	L 0–41		
November 15	Illinois State Normal	Lincoln Field; Charleston, IL (rivalry)	L 26–27		
November 22	at Northern Illinois State	Glidden Field; DeKalb, IL	W 7–0		
*Non-conference game; ^{†}Homecoming
