= 1985 Miami Redskins football team =

American college football season

1985 Miami Redskins football
- Conference: Mid-American Conference
- Record: 8–2–1 (7–1–1 MAC)
- Head coach: Tim Rose (3rd season)
- Defensive coordinator: Dean Pees (3rd season)
- Home stadium: Yager Stadium

1985 Mid-American Conference football standings
	Conf.					Overall
Team	W		L		T	W		L		T
Bowling Green $	9	–	0	–	0	11	–	1	–	0
Miami (OH)	7	–	1	–	1	8	–	2	–	1
Central Michigan	6	–	3	–	0	7	–	3	–	0
Western Michigan	4	–	4	–	1	4	–	6	–	1
Northern Illinois	4	–	4	–	0	4	–	7	–	0
Ball State	3	–	6	–	0	4	–	7	–	0
Eastern Michigan	3	–	6	–	0	4	–	7	–	0
Toledo	3	–	6	–	0	4	–	7	–	0
Kent State	2	–	6	–	0	3	–	8	–	0
Ohio	2	–	7	–	0	2	–	9	–	0
$ – Conference champion

The 1985 Miami Redskins football team was an American football team that represented Miami University in the Mid-American Conference (MAC) during the 1985 NCAA Division I-A football season. In its third season under head coach Tim Rose, the team compiled an 8–2–1 record (7–1–1 against MAC opponents), finished in second place in the MAC, and outscored all opponents by a combined total of 266 to 211.

The team's statistical leaders included Terry Morris with 1,471 passing yards, George Swarn with 1,511 rushing yards, and Tom Murphy with 430 receiving yards.

== Schedule ==
Date	Opponent	Site	Result	Attendance	Source
September 14	at Ball State	Ball State Stadium; Muncie, IN	W 17–13	9,510	
September 21	at Bowling Green	Doyt Perry Stadium; Bowling Green, OH	L 24–28	23,500	
September 28	at No. 7 Oklahoma State*	Lewis Field; Stillwater, OK	L 10–45		
October 5	Ohio	Yager Stadium; Oxford, OH (rivalry)	W 29–22	29,981	
October 12	at Toledo	Glass Bowl; Toledo, OH	W 26–14		
October 19	Western Michigan	Yager Stadium; Oxford, OH	T 10–10		
October 26	Northern Illinois	Yager Stadium; Oxford, OH	W 32–15		
November 2	at Central Michigan	Kelly/Shorts Stadium; Mount Pleasant, MI	W 19–14	15,321	
November 9	Kent State	Yager Stadium; Oxford, OH	W 52–24		
November 16	at Eastern Michigan	Rynearson Stadium; Ypsilanti, MI	W 31–16	3,000	
November 23	Cincinnati*	Yager Stadium; Oxford, OH (rivalry)	W 16–10	21,893	
*Non-conference game; Rankings from AP Poll released prior to the game
