= Larry Bitcon =

American football player and coach (1934–1973)

Biographical details
- Born: October 20, 1934; Iowa, US
- Died: May 3, 1973 (aged 38); Monmouth, Illinois, US

Playing career
- 1953–1954: Iowa State Teachers
- Position: Halfback

Coaching career (HC unless noted)
- 1956: Scranton HS (IA)
- 1957–1959: Grundy Center HS (IA)
- 1960–1962: State College of Iowa (assistant)
- 1963–1964: Arkansas (assistant)
- 1965–1971: Illinois State

Head coaching record
- Overall: 32–35–2 (college); 28–4 (high school)

Accomplishments and honors

Championships
- 2 IIAC (1967–1968)

Lawrence "Bub" Bitcon (October 20, 1934 – May 3, 1973) was an American football coach. He was the 14th head football coach at Illinois State University in Normal, Illinois, serving for seven seasons, from 1965 to 1971 and compiling a record of 32–35–2.

Bitcon was killed in a head-on automobile crash near Monmouth, Illinois on May 3, 1973.

== Head coaching record ==
=== College ===
Year	Team	Overall	Conference	Standing	Bowl/playoffs
Illinois State Redbirds (Interstate Intercollegiate Athletic Conference) (1965–1969)
1965	Illinois State	0–9	0–4	5th	
1966	Illinois State	2–5–2	0–2–1	4th	
1967	Illinois State	8–2	2–1	T–1st	
1968	Illinois State	6–4	2–1	T–1st	
1969	Illinois State	5–5	1–2	3rd	
Illinois State Redbirds (NCAA College Division independent) (1970–1971)
1970	Illinois State	5–5			
1971	Illinois State	6–5			
Illinois State:		32–35–2	5–10–1		
Total:		32–35–2			
National championship Conference title Conference division title or championship game berth
