= 1985 Northern Illinois Huskies football team =

American college football season

1985 Northern Illinois Huskies football
- Conference: Mid-American Conference
- Record: 4–7 (4–4 MAC)
- Head coach: Jerry Pettibone (1st season)
- Offensive coordinator: Pat Ruel (1st season)
- Defensive coordinator: Ted Huber (2nd season)
- MVP: Tim Griffin
- Captains: Tim Griffin; Scott Kellar; Curt Pardridge
- Home stadium: Huskie Stadium

1985 Mid-American Conference football standings
| | Conf. | | | | | Overall |
| Team | W | | L | | T | W | | L | | T |
|---|---|---|---|---|---|---|---|---|---|---|
| Bowling Green $ | 9 | – | 0 | – | 0 | 11 | – | 1 | – | 0 |
| Miami (OH) | 7 | – | 1 | – | 1 | 8 | – | 2 | – | 1 |
| Central Michigan | 6 | – | 3 | – | 0 | 7 | – | 3 | – | 0 |
| Western Michigan | 4 | – | 4 | – | 1 | 4 | – | 6 | – | 1 |
| Northern Illinois | 4 | – | 4 | – | 0 | 4 | – | 7 | – | 0 |
| Ball State | 3 | – | 6 | – | 0 | 4 | – | 7 | – | 0 |
| Eastern Michigan | 3 | – | 6 | – | 0 | 4 | – | 7 | – | 0 |
| Toledo | 3 | – | 6 | – | 0 | 4 | – | 7 | – | 0 |
| Kent State | 2 | – | 6 | – | 0 | 3 | – | 8 | – | 0 |
| Ohio | 2 | – | 7 | – | 0 | 2 | – | 9 | – | 0 |
$ – Conference champion

The 1985 Northern Illinois Huskies football team represented Northern Illinois University as a member of the Mid-American Conference (MAC) during the 1985 NCAA Division I-A football season. Led by first-year head coach Jerry Pettibone, the Huskies compiled an overall record of 4–7 with a mark of 4–4 in conference play, placing fifth in the MAC. Northern Illinois played home games at Huskie Stadium in DeKalb, Illinois.

== Schedule ==
| Date | Opponent | Site | Result | Attendance | Source |
|---|---|---|---|---|---|
| September 7 | Western Michigan | Huskie Stadium; DeKalb, IL | W 17–0 | 21,362 | |
| September 14 | at Wisconsin* | Camp Randall Stadium; Madison, WI | L 17–38 | 69,131 | |
| September 21 | at No. 4 Iowa* | Kinnick Stadium; Iowa City, IA | L 20–48 | 66,014 | |
| September 28 | at Northwestern* | Dyche Stadium; Evanston, IL | L 16–38 | 28,882 | |
| October 5 | at Ball State | Ball State Stadium; Muncie, IN (rivalry) | L 0–29 | 10,125 | |
| October 19 | Toledo^{†} | Huskie Stadium; DeKalb, IL | W 16–3 | 26,420 | |
| October 26 | at Miami (OH) | Yager Stadium; Oxford, OH | L 15–32 | | |
| November 2 | Bowling Green | Huskie Stadium; DeKalb, IL | L 14–34 | 22,600 | |
| November 9 | at Eastern Michigan | Rynearson Stadium; Ypsilanti, MI | W 3–0 | 2,000 | |
| November 16 | Ohio | Huskie Stadium; DeKalb, IL | W 35–7 | | |
| November 23 | at Central Michigan | Kelly/Shorts Stadium; Mount Pleasant, MI | L 21–30 | 12,016 | |
*Non-conference game; ^{†}Homecoming; Rankings from AP Poll released prior to the game

== Roster ==
1985 Northern Illinois Huskies football team roster
Players
Coaches
Offense

| Pos. | # | Name | Class |
|---|---|---|---|
| WR | 82 | Curt Pardridge | Sr |
| OT | 76 | Todd Peat | Jr |
| QB | 1 | Marshall Taylor | Fr |
| QB | 4 | Pete Genatempo | So |
| RB | 35 | Darryl Richardson | Sr |

Defense

| Pos. | # | Name | Class |
|---|---|---|---|
| LB | 39 | Doug Bartlett | Jr |
| DT | 99 | Scott Kellar | Sr |
| SS | 49 | Clarence Vaughn | Jr |

Special teams

| Pos. | # | Name | Class |

Head coach

- Jerry Pettibone

Coordinators/assistant coaches

Legend

- (C) Team captain
- (S) Suspended
- (I) Ineligible
- Injured
- Redshirt
