= 1952 Southern Illinois Salukis football team =

American college football season

1952 Southern Illinois Salukis football
- Conference: Interstate Intercollegiate Athletic Conference
- Record: 2–6 (2–4 IIAC)
- Head coach: William O'Brien (1st season)
- Home stadium: McAndrew Stadium

1952 Interstate Intercollegiate Athletic Conference football standings
| | Conf. | | | | | Overall |
| Team | W | | L | | T | W | | L | | T |
|---|---|---|---|---|---|---|---|---|---|---|
| Central Michigan $ | 6 | – | 0 | – | 0 | 7 | – | 2 | – | 0 |
| Western Illinois | 5 | – | 1 | – | 0 | 7 | – | 2 | – | 0 |
| Michigan State Normal | 3 | – | 2 | – | 1 | 5 | – | 3 | – | 1 |
| Northern Illinois State | 2 | – | 4 | – | 0 | 3 | – | 6 | – | 0 |
| Southern Illinois | 2 | – | 4 | – | 0 | 2 | – | 6 | – | 0 |
| Illinois State Normal | 1 | – | 4 | – | 1 | 1 | – | 6 | – | 2 |
| Eastern Illinois | 1 | – | 5 | – | 0 | 2 | – | 7 | – | 0 |
$ – Conference champion

The 1952 Southern Illinois Salukis football team was an American football team that represented Southern Illinois University (now known as Southern Illinois University Carbondale) in the Interstate Intercollegiate Athletic Conference (IIAC) during the 1952 college football season. Under first-year head coach William O'Brien, the team compiled a 2–6 record. The team played its home games at McAndrew Stadium in Carbondale, Illinois.

== Schedule ==
| Date | Opponent | Site | Result | Attendance | Source |
|---|---|---|---|---|---|
| September 27 | Southeast Missouri State* | McAndrew Stadium; Carbondale, IL | L 0–20 | | |
| October 4 | Illinois State Normal | McAndrew Stadium; Carbondale, IL | W 27–20 | | |
| October 11 | at Northern Illinois State | Glidden Field; DeKalb, IL | L 7–21 | 7,000 | |
| October 18 | at Central Michigan | Alumni Field; Mount Pleasant, MI | L 7–55 | | |
| October 25 | at Eastern Illinois | Lincoln Field; Charleston, IL | W 22–7 | | |
| November 1 | Washington University*^{†} | McAndrew Stadium; Carbondale, IL | L 14–19 | 5,500 | |
| November 7 | Western Illinois | McAndrew Stadium; Carbondale, IL | L 7–38 | | |
| November 15 | Michigan State Normal | McAndrew Stadium; Carbondale, IL | L 6–30 | | |
*Non-conference game; ^{†}Homecoming
