= 1985 Ball State Cardinals football team =

American college football season

1985 Ball State Cardinals football
- Conference: Mid-American Conference
- Record: 4–7 (3–6 MAC)
- Head coach: Paul Schudel (1st season)
- Home stadium: Ball State Stadium

1985 Mid-American Conference football standings
	Conf.					Overall
Team	W		L		T	W		L		T
Bowling Green $	9	–	0	–	0	11	–	1	–	0
Miami (OH)	7	–	1	–	1	8	–	2	–	1
Central Michigan	6	–	3	–	0	7	–	3	–	0
Western Michigan	4	–	4	–	1	4	–	6	–	1
Northern Illinois	4	–	4	–	0	4	–	7	–	0
Ball State	3	–	6	–	0	4	–	7	–	0
Eastern Michigan	3	–	6	–	0	4	–	7	–	0
Toledo	3	–	6	–	0	4	–	7	–	0
Kent State	2	–	6	–	0	3	–	8	–	0
Ohio	2	–	7	–	0	2	–	9	–	0
$ – Conference champion

The 1985 Ball State Cardinals football team was an American football team that represented Ball State University in the Mid-American Conference (MAC) during the 1985 NCAA Division I-A football season. In its first season under head coach Paul Schudel, the team compiled a 4–7 record (3–6 against conference opponents) and finished in a three-way tie for sixth place out of ten teams in the MAC. The team played its home games at Ball State Stadium in Muncie, Indiana.

The team's statistical leaders included Wade Kosakowski with 1,614 passing yards, Carlton Campbell with 747 rushing yards, Deon Chester with 617 receiving yards, and John Diettrich with 87 points scored.

== Schedule ==
Date	Opponent	Site	Result	Attendance	Source
September 7	Bowling Green	Ball State Stadium; Muncie, IN	L 6–31	10,201	
September 14	Miami (OH)	Ball State Stadium; Muncie, IN	L 13–17	9,510	
September 21	at Purdue*	Ross–Ade Stadium; West Lafayette, IN	L 18–37	63,162	
September 28	at Toledo	Glass Bowl; Toledo, OH	W 23–19	23,671	
October 5	Northern Illinois	Ball State Stadium; Muncie, IN (rivalry)	W 29–0	10,125	
October 12	at Ohio	Peden Stadium; Athens, OH	W 36–23		
October 19	at Kent State	Dix Stadium; Kent, OH	L 16–45	9,519	
October 26	at Western Michigan	Waldo Stadium; Kalamazoo, MI	L 0–34		
November 2	Eastern Michigan	Ball State Stadium; Muncie, IN	L 24–27	10,530	
November 9	vs. Indiana State*	Hoosier Dome; Indianapolis, IN (Blue Key Victory Bell)	W 29–27	11,575	
November 16	Central Michigan	Ball State Stadium; Muncie, IN	L 9–23		
*Non-conference game
