= 1968 Eastern Illinois Panthers football team =

American college football season

1968 Eastern Illinois Panthers football
- Conference: Interstate Intercollegiate Athletic Conference
- Record: 4–5 (1–2 IIAC)
- Head coach: Clyde Biggers (4th season)
- Home stadium: Lincoln Field

1968 Interstate Intercollegiate Athletic Conference football standings
	Conf.					Overall
Team	W		L		T	W		L		T
Central Michigan +	2	–	1	–	0	7	–	2	–	0
Illinois State +	2	–	1	–	0	6	–	4	–	0
Eastern Illinois	1	–	2	–	0	4	–	5	–	0
Western Illinois	1	–	2	–	0	2	–	7	–	1
+ – Conference co-champions

The 1968 Eastern Illinois Panthers football team was an American football team that represented Eastern Illinois University in the Interstate Intercollegiate Athletic Conference (IIAC) during the 1968 NCAA College Division football season. Led by fourth-year head coach Clyde Biggers, the Panthers compiled an overall record of 4–5 with a mark of 1–2 in conference play, tying for third place in the IIAC. The team played its home games at Lincoln Field in Charleston, Illinois.

Quarterback Joe Davis led the team with 1,363 yards of total offense, an average of 151.4 yards per game. Davis also set an EIU single-season record with 307 yards of total offense.

Fullback Dennis Bundy was the leading rusher with 529 rushing yards and 10 touchdowns on 155 carries.

Tight end Ed Stephens was the team's leading receiver with 40 catches for 483 yards and three touchdowns. Stephens also set an EIU single-season record with 99 receiving yards against Wayne State. The club also set the school's single-game total offense record with 545 yards against Wayne State.

== Schedule ==
Date	Opponent	Site	Result	Attendance	Source
September 14	Indiana State*	Lincoln Field; Charleston, IL	L 0–23	5,000	
September 21	Milwaukee*	Lincoln Field; Charleston, IL	W 15–14	5,000	
September 28	Fairmont State*	Lincoln Field; Charleston, IL	L 0–6	3,000	
October 5	Central Michigan	Lincoln Field; Charleston, IL	L 16–23	2,800–3,500	
October 12	at No. 18 Illinois State	Hancock Stadium; Normal, IL (rivalry)	L 14–41	8,500	
October 19	Bradley*	Lincoln Field; Charleston, IL	L 28–37	6,500	
October 26	at Western Illinois	Hanson Field; Macomb, IL	W 14–8	12,450	
November 2	at Chicago Circle*	Soldier Field; Chicago, IL	W 8–7	5,000	
November 9	at Wayne State (MI)*	Tartar Field; Detroit, MI	W 60–19	737	
*Non-conference game; Rankings from AP Poll released prior to the game

== Roster ==
1968 Eastern Illinois Panthers football team roster
Players			Coaches
Offense: Pos. / # / Name / Class; QB / 12 / Joe Davis / Sr	Defense: Pos. / # / Name / Class	Special teams: Pos. / # / Name / Class	Head coach Coordinators/assistant coaches Legend: (C) Team captain; (S) Suspended; (I) Ineligible; Injured; Redshirt
