= 1952 Northern Illinois State Huskies football team =

American college football season

1952 Northern Illinois State Huskies football
- Conference: Interstate Intercollegiate Athletic Conference
- Record: 3–6 (2–4 IIAC)
- Head coach: Chick Evans (24th season)
- MVP: Jim McKinzie
- Captain: Game captains
- Home stadium: Glidden Field

1952 Interstate Intercollegiate Athletic Conference football standings
	Conf.					Overall
Team	W		L		T	W		L		T
Central Michigan $	6	–	0	–	0	7	–	2	–	0
Western Illinois	5	–	1	–	0	7	–	2	–	0
Michigan State Normal	3	–	2	–	1	5	–	3	–	1
Northern Illinois State	2	–	4	–	0	3	–	6	–	0
Southern Illinois	2	–	4	–	0	2	–	6	–	0
Illinois State Normal	1	–	4	–	1	1	–	6	–	2
Eastern Illinois	1	–	5	–	0	2	–	7	–	0
$ – Conference champion

The 1952 Northern Illinois State Huskies football team represented Northern Illinois State Teachers College—now known as Northern Illinois University—as a member of the Interstate Intercollegiate Athletic Conference (IIAC) during the 1952 college football season. Led by 24th-year head coach Chick Evans, the Huskies compiled an overall record of 3–6 with a mark of 2–4 in conference play, tying for fourth place in the IIAC. The team played home games at the 5,500-seat Glidden Field, located on the east end of campus, in DeKalb, Illinois.

== Schedule ==
Date	Opponent	Site	Result	Attendance	Source
September 20	at Lewis*	Joliet, IL	L 7–12		
September 27	Central Michigan	Glidden Field; DeKalb, IL	L 7–56		
October 4	at Beloit*	Strong Memorial Stadium; Beloit, WI	L 7–28		
October 11	Southern Illinois^{†}	Glidden Field; DeKalb, IL	W 21–7	7,000	
October 18	at Michigan State Normal	Briggs Field; Ypsilanti, MI	L 7–19		
October 25	at Illinois State Normal	McCormick Field; Normal, IL	W 28–20		
November 1	Omaha*	Glidden Field; DeKalb, IL	W 20–6		
November 15	at Western Illinois	Hanson Field; Macomb, IL	L 14–39		
November 22	Eastern Illinois	Glidden Field; DeKalb, IL	L 0–7		
*Non-conference game; ^{†}Homecoming
