= 1968 Illinois State Redbirds football team =

American college football season

1968 Illinois State Redbirds football

IIAC co-champion
- Conference: Interstate Intercollegiate Athletic Conference
- Record: 6–4 (2–1 IIAC)
- Head coach: Larry Bitcon (4th season)
- MVP: Guy Homoly
- Captains: Denny Nelson; Hank Guenther
- Home stadium: Hancock Stadium

1968 Interstate Intercollegiate Athletic Conference football standings
	Conf.					Overall
Team	W		L		T	W		L		T
Central Michigan +	2	–	1	–	0	7	–	2	–	0
Illinois State +	2	–	1	–	0	6	–	4	–	0
Eastern Illinois	1	–	2	–	0	4	–	5	–	0
Western Illinois	1	–	2	–	0	2	–	7	–	1
+ – Conference co-champions

The 1968 Illinois State Redbirds football team represented Illinois State University as a member of the Interstate Intercollegiate Athletic Conference (IIAC) during the 1968 NCAA College Division football season. Led by fourth-year head coach Larry Bitcon, the Redbirds compiled an overall record of 6–4 with a mark of 2–1 in conference play, sharing the IIAC title with Central Michigan for the second consecutive season. Illinois State played home games at Hancock Stadium in Normal, Illinois.

== Schedule ==
Date	Opponent	Rank	Site	Result	Attendance	Source
September 14	at Milwaukee*		Shorewood Stadium; Shorewood, WI	W 34–14	4,500	
September 21	Illinois Wesleyan*		Hancock Stadium; Normal, IL	W 34–0	15,000	
September 28	Chicago Circle*		Hancock Stadium; Normal, IL	W 26–14	13,000–14,000	
October 5	at Central Missouri State*		Vernon Kennedy Field	L 0–28	3,500	
October 12	Eastern Illinois	No. 18	Hancock Stadium; Normal, IL (rivalry)	W 41–14	8,500	
October 19	Western Illinois^{†}		Hancock Stadium; Normal, IL	W 21–10	20,000	
October 26	at Central Michigan		Alumni Field; Mount Pleasant, MI	L 16–19	12,000	
November 2	at No. 15 Akron*		Rubber Bowl; Akron, OH	L 0–46	3,500–3,559	
November 9	at Ferris State*		Top Taggart Field; Big Rapids, MI	L 28–29	4,000	
November 16	Bradley*		Hancock Stadium; Normal, IL	W 42–26	5,000	
*Non-conference game; ^{†}Homecoming; Rankings from AP Poll released prior to the game
