= Tom Hollman =

American football coach

Biographical details
- Born: c. 1946

Playing career
- 1964–1967: Ohio Northern

Coaching career (HC unless noted)
- 1968–1970: Sidney HS (OH) (assistant)
- 1971–1973: Greenville HS (OH)
- 1974–1975: Fremont Ross HS (OH)
- 1976: Ohio Northern (DC)
- 1977–1980: Wooster
- 1981–1982: Ball State (DB)
- 1983–1984: Ball State (AHC/DC)
- 1985–1987: Ohio (DC)
- 1988–1999: Edinboro

Head coaching record
- Overall: 102–60–3 (college); 41–5–4 (high school)
- Tournaments: 1–5 (NCAA D-II playoffs)

Accomplishments and honors

Championships
- 2 PSAC West Division (1989, 1995)

Thomas C. "Scooter" Hollman (born c. 1946) is an American former football player and coach. He served as the head football coach the College of Wooster from 1977 to 1980 and Edinboro University of Pennsylvania—now known as Pennsylvania Western University, Edinboro—from 1988 to 1999, compiling a career college football head coaching record of 102–60–3.

A native of St. Marys, Ohio, Hollman played college football at Ohio Northern University from 1964 to 1967. He began his coaching career at the high school level in Ohio. Hollman was the head football coach at Greenville High School in Greenville, Ohio from 1971 to 1972 and Fremont Ross High School in Fremont, Ohio from 1973 to 1975, leading his teams at the two schools to a record of 41–5–4 in five seasons. After spending the 1976 season as his alma mater, Ohio Northern, as defensive coordinator, Hollman was hired at Wooster in early 1977. He left Wooster after four seasons, in 1981, to become an assistant football coach at Ball State University under head coach Dwight Wallace. In 1983, he was promoted to assistant head football coach at Ball State.

At Edinboro, Hollman led his teams to two Pennsylvania State Athletic Conference (PSAC) West Division titles, in 1989 and 1995, and five appearances in the NCAA Division II football championship playoffs. He guided the Edinboro Fighting Scots to 78–49–2 record in 12 season,s but was fired in 1999 following three consecutive losing campaigns.

== Head coaching record ==
=== College ===
Year	Team	Overall	Conference	Standing	Bowl/playoffs	NCAA^{#}
Wooster Fighting Scots (Ohio Athletic Conference) (1977–1980)
1977	Wooster	6–3	3–2	3rd (Red)		
1978	Wooster	6–3	3–2	3rd (Red)		
1979	Wooster	6–3	3–2	T–2nd (Blue)		
1980	Wooster	6–2–1	3–2–1	3rd (Blue)		
Wooster:		24–11–1	12–8–1			
Edinboro Fighting Scots (Pennsylvania State Athletic Conference) (1988–1999)
1988	Edinboro	5–4–1	5–1–1	3rd (West)		
1989	Edinboro	8–3	6–0	1st (West)	L NCAA Division II First Round	7
1990	Edinboro	9–3	5–1	2nd (West)	L NCAA Division II Quarterfinal	11
1991	Edinboro	7–4	3–3	4th (West)		
1992	Edinboro	8–2–1	4–1–1	3rd (West)	L NCAA Division II First Round	15
1993	Edinboro	8–3	5–1	2nd (West)	L NCAA Division II First Round	T–20
1994	Edinboro	7–3	4–2	T–2nd (West)		17
1995	Edinboro	9–2	6–0	1st (West)	L NCAA Division II First Round	8
1996	Edinboro	6–4	4–2	T–3rd (West)		
1997	Edinboro	4–6	2–4	T–4th (West)		
1998	Edinboro	4–7	2–4	T–4th (West)		
1999	Edinboro	3–8	2–4	T–4th (West)		
Edinboro:		78–49–2	48–23–2			
Total:		102–60–3				
National championship Conference title Conference division title or championship game berth
