= 1968 Central Michigan Chippewas football team =

American college football season

1968 Central Michigan Chippewas football

IIAC co-champion
- Conference: Interstate Intercollegiate Athletic Conference
- Record: 7–2 (2–1 IIAC)
- Head coach: Roy Kramer (2nd season)
- MVP: Craig Tefft
- Home stadium: Alumni Field

1968 Interstate Intercollegiate Athletic Conference football standings
	Conf.					Overall
Team	W		L		T	W		L		T
Central Michigan +	2	–	1	–	0	7	–	2	–	0
Illinois State +	2	–	1	–	0	6	–	4	–	0
Eastern Illinois	1	–	2	–	0	4	–	5	–	0
Western Illinois	1	–	2	–	0	2	–	7	–	1
+ – Conference co-champions

The 1968 Central Michigan Chippewas football team represented Central Michigan University in the Interstate Intercollegiate Athletic Conference (IIAC) during the 1968 NCAA College Division football season. In their second season under head coach Roy Kramer, the Chippewas compiled a 7–2 record (2–1 against IIAC opponents), tied for the IIAC championship and outscored their opponents, 256 to 132. The team's statistical leaders included quarterback Bob Miles with 918 passing yards, tailback Craig Tefft with 1,126 rushing yards, and Dave Lemere with 325 receiving yards. Tefft received the team's most valuable player award. Seven Central Michigan players (Tefft, defensive end Bucky Colton, guard Fred Ferguson, linebacker Steve Lockman, defensive back Bob Markey, tackle Mike Post, and offensive tackle Ralph Sarnowski) received first-team honors on the All-IIAC team.

== Schedule ==
Date	Opponent	Rank	Site	Result	Attendance	Source
September 14	at Bradley*		Peoria, IL	W 41–6	3,000	
September 21	Youngstown State*		Alumni Field; Mount Pleasant, MI	W 24–20	8,100	
September 28	No. 7 Northern Michigan*	No. 8	Alumni Field; Mount Pleasant, MI	L 24–28	8,200	
October 5	at Eastern Illinois		Lincoln Field; Charleston, IL	W 23–16	2,800–3,500	
October 12	at Hillsdale*		Hillsdale, MI	W 35–10	5,300	
October 19	Central State (OH)*		Alumni Field; Mount Pleasant, MI	W 27–0	7,200	
October 26	Illinois State^{†}		Alumni Field; Mount Pleasant, MI	W 19–16	12,000	
November 2	Western Illinois	No. 16	Alumni Field; Mount Pleasant, MI	L 28–30	7,300	
November 16	Wayne State (MI)*		Alumni Field; Mount Pleasant, MI	W 35–6	2,500	
*Non-conference game; ^{†}Homecoming; Rankings from AP Poll released prior to the game
