= 1967 Central Michigan Chippewas football team =

American college football season

1967 Central Michigan Chippewas football

IIAC co-champion
- Conference: Interstate Intercollegiate Athletic Conference
- Record: 8–2 (2–1 IIAC)
- Head coach: Roy Kramer (1st season)
- MVP: Wally Hempton
- Home stadium: Alumni Field

1967 Interstate Intercollegiate Athletic Conference football standings
	Conf.					Overall
Team	W		L		T	W		L		T
Central Michigan +	2	–	1	–	0	8	–	2	–	0
Illinois State +	2	–	1	–	0	8	–	2	–	0
Eastern Illinois	1	–	2	–	0	2	–	6	–	1
Western Illinois	1	–	2	–	0	2	–	6	–	0
+ – Conference co-champions

The 1967 Central Michigan Chippewas football team represented Central Michigan University in the Interstate Intercollegiate Athletic Conference (IIAC) during the 1967 NCAA College Division football season. In their first season under head coach Roy Kramer, the Chippewas compiled an 8–2 record (2–1 against IIAC opponents), tied for the IIAC championship, held five of their ten opponents to fewer than seven points, and outscored all opponents by a combined total of 207 to 84.

The team's statistical leaders included quarterback Gene Gilin with 611 passing yards, tailback Craig Tefft with 1,046 rushing yards, and end Greg Hoefler with 292 receiving yards. Fullback Wally Hempton received the team's most valuable player award. Ten Central Michigan players (Tefft, Hoefler, Hempton, backs Chuck Barker and Bruce Cameron, defensive ends Bucky Colton and Mark Maksimovicz, guard Al McNeal, and tackles Ralph Sarnowski and Raleigh Smith) received first-team honors on the All-IIAC team.

Bill Kelly retired as Central Michigan's head football coach at the end of the 1966 season after 16 years in the position. Roy Kramer, who had served as Central's freshman football coach in 1966, was hired to replace him.

== Schedule ==
Date	Opponent	Site	Result	Attendance	Source
September 16	Bradley*	Alumni Field; Mount Pleasant, MI	W 23–21	7,500	
September 22	at Youngstown State*	Youngstown, OH	W 16–2	4,500	
September 30	vs. Northern Michigan*	Saginaw, MI	L 15–21	10,500	
October 7	Eastern Illinois	Alumni Field; Mount Pleasant, MI	W 21–0	5,000	
October 14	Hillsdale*^{†}	Alumni Field; Mount Pleasant, MI	W 30–6	12,000	
October 21	at Central State (OH)*	Wilberforce, OH	W 33–0	5,000	
October 28	at Illinois State	Hancock Stadium; Normal, IL	W 19–14	18,000	
November 4	at Western Illinois	Hanson Field; Macomb, IL	L 7–13	9,000	
November 11	Morehead State*	Alumni Field; Mount Pleasant, MI	W 9–7	5,000	
November 18	at Wayne State (MI)*	Tartar Field; Detroit, MI	W 34–0	3,000–5,000	
*Non-conference game; ^{†}Homecoming
