= Dan Ferrigno =

American football player and coach (born 1953)

Biographical details
- Born: March 24, 1953 (age 73); San Francisco, California, U.S.

Playing career
- 1971–1974: San Francisco State
- Position: Wide receiver

Coaching career (HC unless noted)
- 1975–1977: St. Ignatius Prep (CA) (WR/TE/DB)
- 1978: San Francisco State (WR/TE)
- 1979: Pacific (CA) (WR)
- 1980: California (TE)
- 1981: California (OL)
- 1982–1983: Western Michigan (RB)
- 1984: Western Michigan (OL)
- 1985: Western Michigan (OC/OL)
- 1986: Western Michigan (OC/QB)
- 1987–1990: Oregon State (ST/RB)
- 1991–1995: Oregon State (ST/OLB)
- 1996–1998: California (ST/WR/TE)
- 1999: California (ST/WR)
- 2000: USC (ST/WR)
- 2001–2005: Oregon (WR)
- 2006–2007: California (WR)
- 2008: Saint Mary's College HS (CA)
- 2009–2010: San Diego State (ST/TE)
- 2011–2014: Michigan (ST/TE)
- 2015–2016: San Jose State (ST/TE)
- 2017–2019: Cal Poly (ST/WR)
- 2020–2022: Washington State (OA)
- 2023: Washington State (STQC)
- 2024–present: Mission College Prep (ST/WR)

Head coaching record
- Overall: 5–5

Dan Ferrigno (born March 24, 1953) is an American football coach and former player. He was most recently a special teams quality control coach at Washington State University in 2023. Ferrigno is a member of the San Francisco Prep Hall of Fame. During his playing career, he set records at San Francisco State University and Archbishop Riordan High School in San Francisco, California.

== Head coaching record ==
Year	Team	Overall	Conference	Standing	Bowl/playoffs
Saint Mary's College Panthers () (2008)
2008	Saint Mary's College	5–5	4–3	4th	
Saint Mary's College:		5–5	4–3		
Total:		5–5			
