= Charles Tambling =

American football, basketball, and baseball coach

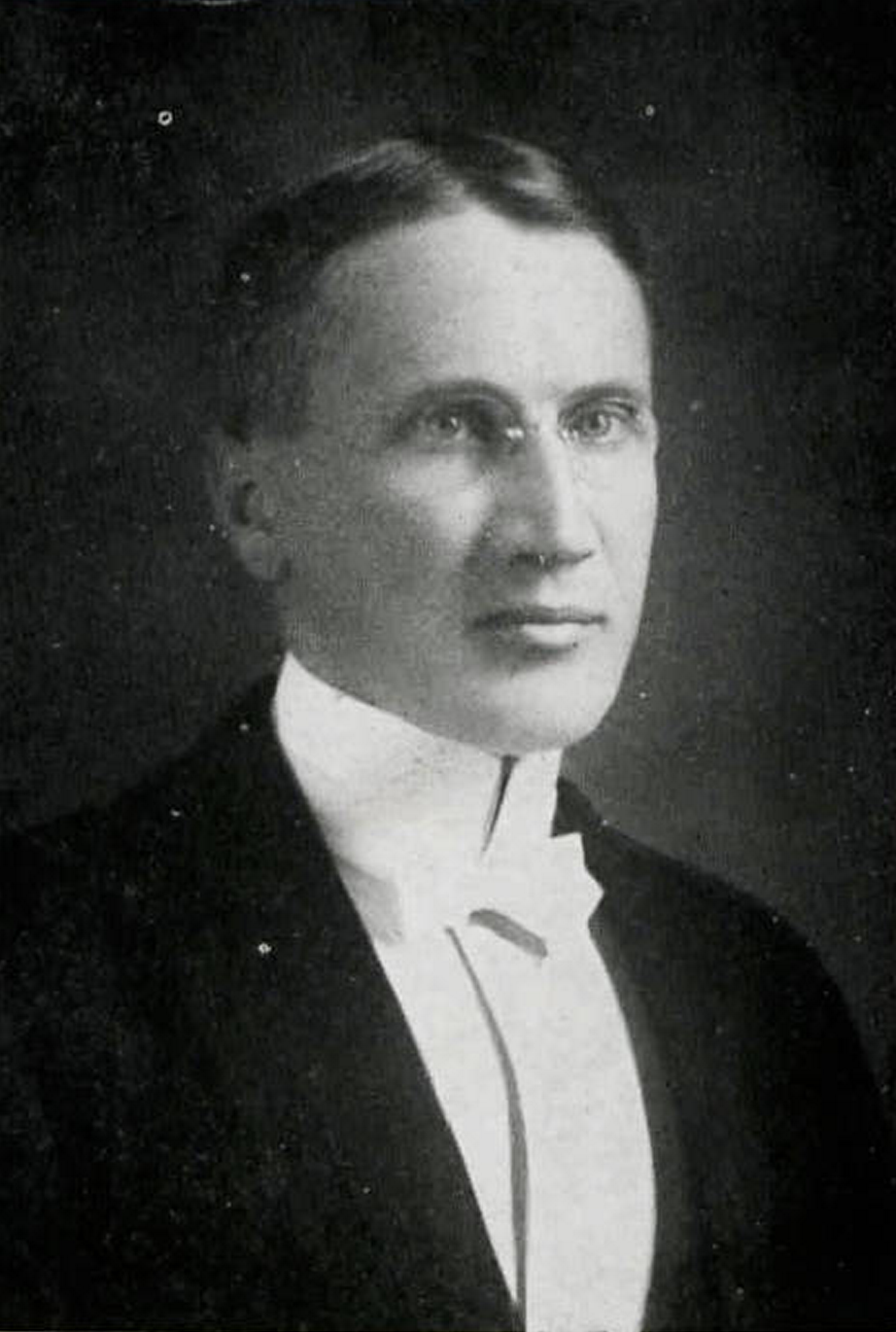
- Tambling pictured in Chippewa 1919, Central Michigan yearbook

Biographical details
- Born: November 1, 1871; Oberlin, Ohio, U.S.
- Died: May 6, 1958 (aged 86); Cathedral City, California, U.S.

Coaching career (HC unless noted)

Football
- 1902–1905: Central Michigan
- 1918: Central Michigan

Basketball
- 1904–1910: Central Michigan
- 1917–1919: Central Michigan

Baseball
- 1901–1907: Central Michigan

Head coaching record
- Overall: 18–2 (football); 60–36 (basketball); 9–6 (baseball)

Charles Finney Tambling (November 1, 1871 – May 6, 1958) was an American college football, college basketball, and college baseball coach. He served as the head football coach at Central Michigan Normal School—now known as Central Michigan University—from 1902 to 1905 and again in 1918. Tambling was the head basketball coach at Central Michigan from 1904 to 1910 and again from 1917 to 1919. He was the school's head baseball coach from 1901 to 1907. Tambling was also the head of the physiology and physical training department at Central Michigan. Tambling graduated from Oberlin College. He moved to Redlands, California in 1937. He resided there for ten years before moving to Cathedral City, California, where he died on May 6, 1958.

== Head coaching record ==
=== Football ===
Year	Team	Overall	Conference	Standing	Bowl/playoffs
Central Michigan Normalites (Independent) (1902–1905)
1902	Central Michigan	4–0			
1903	Central Michigan	6–0			
1904	Central Michigan	0–1			
1905	Central Michigan	7–1			
Central Michigan Normalites (Independent) (1918)
1918	Central Michigan	1–0			
Central Michigan:		18–2			
Total:		18–2			
