= Central Michigan Chippewas football =

Football team of Central Michigan University

2026 Central Michigan Chippewas football team
- First season: 1896; 130 years ago
- Athletic director: Amy Folan
- Head coach: Matt Drinkall; 2nd season, 7–6 (.538)
- Location: Mount Pleasant, Michigan
- Stadium: Kelly/Shorts Stadium (capacity: 35,127)
- NCAA division: Division I FBS
- Conference: MAC
- Colors: Maroon and gold
- All-time record: 658–464–36 (.584)
- Bowl record: 4–10 (.286)

NCAA Division II championships
- 1974

Small college national championships
- 1974

Conference championships
- IIAC: 1952, 1953, 1954, 1955, 1956, 1962, 1966, 1967, 1968 MAC: 1979, 1980, 1990, 1994, 2006, 2007, 2009

Division championships
- MAC West: 2006, 2007, 2009, 2019, 2021
- Rivalries: Western Michigan (rivalry); Eastern Michigan (rivalry)

Uniforms
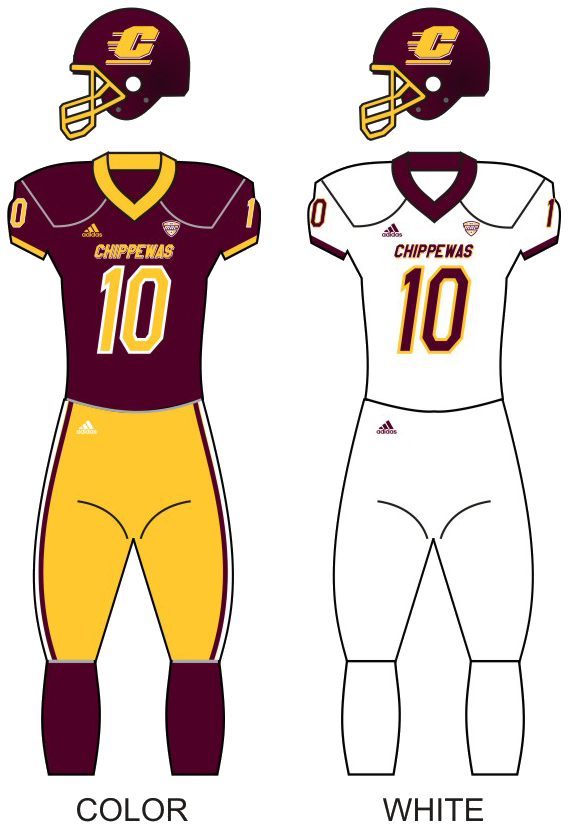
- Fight song: The Fighting Chippewa
- Marching band: The Marching Chippewas
- Website: CMUChippewas.com

The Central Michigan Chippewas are a college football program in Division I FBS, representing Central Michigan University (CMU).

The Chippewas have played in six bowl games in the last nine years, most recently defeating Washington State in the 2021 Sun Bowl. CMU drew 60,624 fans in the 2007 Motor City Bowl. CMU has played a total of eighteen post-season games (conference championships and bowl games), winning seven.

== Conference affiliations ==
Central Michigan has been a member of the following conferences.

- Independent (1896–1926)
- Michigan Collegiate Conference (1927–1930)
- Independent (1931–1949)
- Interstate Intercollegiate Athletic Conference (1950–1969)
- Independent (1970–1974)
- Mid-American Conference (1975–present)

== Championships ==
=== National championships ===
The Chippewas won the 1974 NCAA Division II National Championship.

Year	League	Coach	Record	CG Opponent	Result
1974	NCAA Division II	Roy Kramer	12–1	Delaware	W 54–14

=== Conference championships ===
Central Michigan has won 16 conference championships, including seven Mid-American conference championships.

Season	Conference	Head coach	Overall record	Conference record
1952	Interstate Intercollegiate Athletic Conference	Bill Kelly	7–2	6–0
1953	Interstate Intercollegiate Athletic Conference	Bill Kelly	7–1–1	5–0–1
1954†	Interstate Intercollegiate Athletic Conference	Bill Kelly	8–2	5–1
1955	Interstate Intercollegiate Athletic Conference	Bill Kelly	8–1	5–1
1956	Interstate Intercollegiate Athletic Conference	Bill Kelly	9–0	6–0
1962	Interstate Intercollegiate Athletic Conference	Bill Kelly	6–4	4–0
1966	Interstate Intercollegiate Athletic Conference	Bill Kelly	5–5	3–0
1967†	Interstate Intercollegiate Athletic Conference	Roy Kramer	8–2	2–1
1968†	Interstate Intercollegiate Athletic Conference	Roy Kramer	7–2	2–1
1979	Mid-American Conference	Herb Deromedi	10–0–1	8–0–1
1980	Mid-American Conference	Herb Deromedi	9–2	7–2
1990	Mid-American Conference	Herb Deromedi	8–3–1	7–1
1994	Mid-American Conference	Dick Flynn	9–3	8–1
2006	Mid-American Conference	Brian Kelly	10–4	7–1
2007	Mid-American Conference	Butch Jones	8–6	6–1
2009	Mid-American Conference	Butch Jones	12–2	8–0

† Co-champions

=== Division championships ===
In the division era (1997–2023) of the MAC, Central Michigan has won 5 division championships:

Year	Division	Coach	Opponent	CG result
2006	MAC West	Brian Kelly	Ohio	W 31–10
2007†	MAC West	Butch Jones	Miami	W 35–10
2009	MAC West	Butch Jones	Ohio	W 20–10
2019	MAC West	Jim McElwain	Miami	L 21–26
2021†	MAC West	Jim McElwain	N/A lost tiebreaker to Northern Illinois	

† Co-champions

== Head coaches ==
Many notable coaches have contributed to CMU's culture. Some include "Wild" Bill Kelly who won seven conference championships in sixteen years and whom Kelly/Shorts Stadium is named after; national championship winning coach Roy Kramer who had a 72% winning percentage and never had a losing season in more than a decade; College Football Hall of Fame coach Herb Deromedi who is the winningest coach in MAC history and Brian Kelly and Butch Jones who combined for three MAC Championships in four years, four consecutive bowl appearance and top 25 finish in the nation.

CMU head coaches through the 2025 season.

Coach	Seasons	Years	Record
Pete McCormick	1896	1	3–1
Carl Pray	1897–1899	3	6–5
Unknown	1900	1	1–0
No team	1901		
Charles Tambling	1902–1905, 1918	5	18–2
No team	1906		
Ralph Thacker	1907	1	2–4
Hugh Sutherland	1908	1	4–3
Harry Helmer	1909–1912	4	14–9–2
No team	1913–1915		
Blake Miller	1916	1	1–5
Fred Johnson	1917	1	1–2
Garland Nevitt	1919	1	2–2–3
Joe Simmons	1920	1	4–3–1
Wallace Parker	1921–1923, 1926–1928	6	32–10–6
Lester Barnard	1924–1925	2	11–2–3
Butch Nowack	1929–1930	2	8–5–2
George Van Bibber	1931–1933	3	12–9–2
Alex Yunevich	1934–1936	3	9–13–1
Ron Finch	1937–1946	10	54–18–1
Lyle Bennett	1947–1949	3	8–15–1
Warren Schmakel	1950	1	6–4
Kenneth Kelly	1951–1966	16	91–58–2
Roy Kramer	1967–1977	11	83–32–2
Herb Deromedi	1978–1993	16	110–55–10
Dick Flynn	1994–1999	6	30–37
Mike DeBord	2000–2003	4	12–34
Brian Kelly	2004–2006	3	19–16
Jeff Quinn†	2006	–	1–0
Butch Jones	2007–2009	3	27–13
Steve Stripling†	2009	–	1–0
Dan Enos	2010–2014	5	26–36
John Bonamego	2015–2018	4	22–29
Jim McElwain	2019–2024	6	33–36
Matt Drinkall	2025–present	2	7–6

† Interim

== Bowl games ==
Central Michigan holds a 4–10 record in bowl games.

Year	Bowl	Opponent	Result
1990	California Bowl	San Jose State	L 24–48
1994	Las Vegas Bowl	UNLV	L 24–52
2006	Motor City Bowl	Middle Tennessee State	W 31–14
2007	Motor City Bowl	Purdue	L 48–51
2008	Motor City Bowl	Florida Atlantic	L 21–24
2009	GMAC Bowl	Troy	W 44–41
2012	Little Caesars Pizza Bowl	Western Kentucky	W 24–21
2014	Bahamas Bowl	Western Kentucky	L 48–49
2015	Quick Lane Bowl	Minnesota	L 14–21
2016	Miami Beach Bowl	Tulsa	L 10–55
2017	Famous Idaho Potato Bowl	Wyoming	L 14–37
2019	New Mexico Bowl	San Diego State	L 11–48
2021	Sun Bowl	Washington State	W 24–21
2025	GameAbove Sports Bowl	Northwestern	L 7–34

== Playoff appearances ==
=== NCAA Division II playoffs ===
The Chippewas made one appearance in the Division II playoffs, with a combined record of 3–0.

Year	Round	Opponent	Result
1974	Quarterfinals; Semifinals; National Championship	Boise State; Louisiana Tech; Delaware	W, 20–6; W, 35–14; W, 54–14

== Rivalries ==
=== Western Michigan ===
These archrivals first met in 1907 and have faced one another annually since 1943. Since the two schools are separated by a two-hour drive, the visiting team typically has a strong fan and student presence at the game. The winner of the game receives the Cannon Trophy. The outcome also helps determine the winner of the Michigan MAC Trophy, a trophy fought over between Michigan's three MAC football teams: the Central Michigan Chippewas, the Western Michigan Broncos, and the Eastern Michigan Eagles. WMU leads the series overall 53–40–2 as of November 1, 2025.

=== Eastern Michigan ===
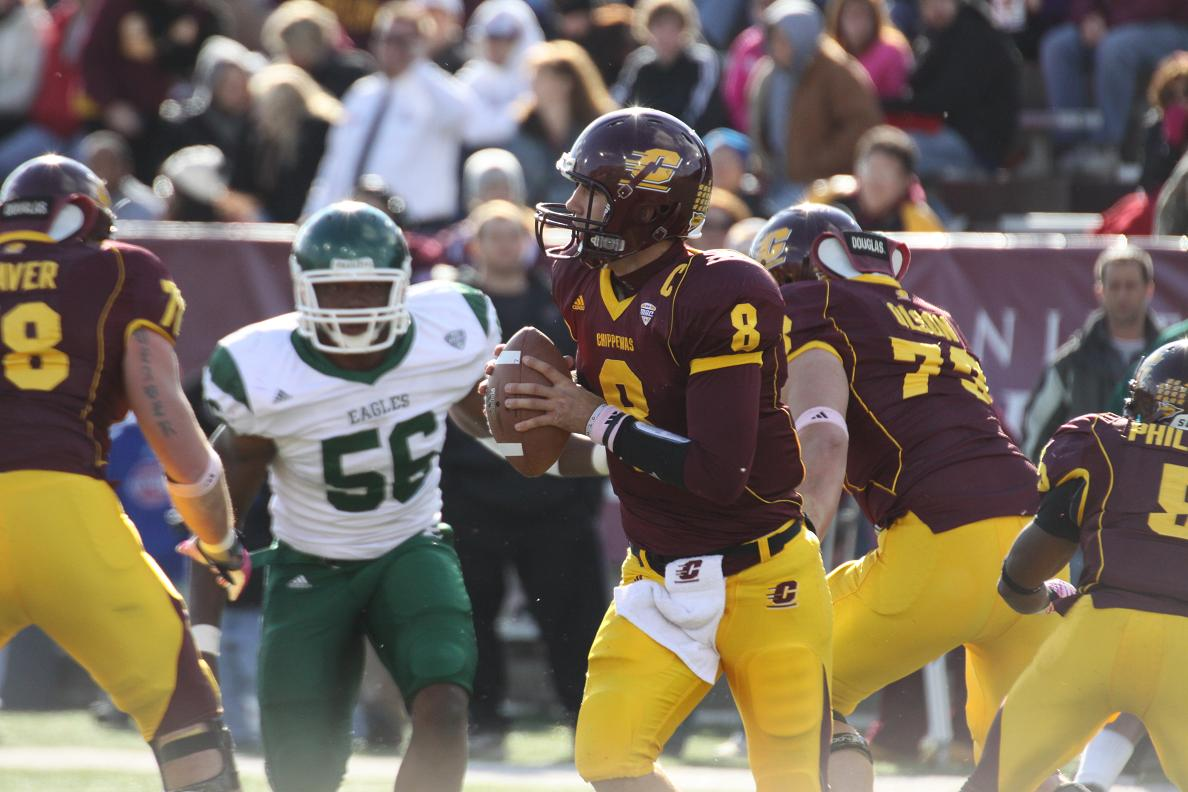
Ryan Radcliff looks to pass during a 2011 game against Eastern Michigan

The Chippewas and Eagles maintain a less prominent, but steady rivalry. CMU holds the series lead over Eastern Michigan, leading 65–32–6.

== Traditions ==
=== Kelly/Shorts game day experience ===
Central Michigan has the largest on-campus stadium in the Mid-American Conference, seating 32,885 fans and has been playing home football games dating back to 1896. The Sporting News has named Kelly/Shorts Stadium "the finest football facility in the Mid-American Conference" and "the best game day atmosphere in the MAC".

The East End of the stadium (as of 2014) once again hosts the CMU Student section backing the football team. The Chippewa Marching Band, cheerleaders, and dance team add to the game day experience and has helped CMU to get a .671 winning percentage all-time at Kelly/Shorts Stadium.

CMU drew a capacity crowd of 35,127 fans for the Central Michigan–Michigan State game televised on ESPNU and has hosted schools from the ACC, Big Ten, and Big 12 conferences. Future opponents at home include schools from the Big Ten, ACC, Big 12, Pac-12 and Mountain West conferences.

In 2010, the CMU Board of Trustees designed and set course to construct a state of the art stadium expansion to integrate a hotel, restaurant, and conference center connected by a glass atrium to new stadium suites on the east side. This addition will be custom-built into Kelly/Shorts Stadium.

Newer upgrades include a video scoreboard standing six stories and featuring two video replay boards—one facing into the stadium and a second board facing outside the stadium by tailgating areas. NFL-quality permanent lighting has been installed for television and future ESPN night games.

== College Football Hall of Fame ==
Two former Central Michigan coaches have been inducted into the College Football Hall of Fame.

Name	Position	Career	Induction
Herb Deromedi	Head coach	1978–1993	2007
Roy Kramer	Head coach	1967-1977	2023

== Notable players ==
- Curtis Adams (1984) – AP All-American, San Diego Chargers running back, NFL draft choice
- Jahleel Addae (2012) - Los Angeles Chargers Safety
- Vince Agnew – NFL and CFL player
- Ron Bartell (2004) – cornerback, 2nd round NFL draft choice, nine-year NFL veteran finishing career with the Detroit Lions
- Dan Bazuin (2006) – All-American, Chicago Bears defensive end, 2007 NFL 2nd round draft choice
- Walter Beach (1959) – AP All-American, Cleveland Browns safety, NFL draft choice of the New York Giants
- Nick Bellore (2010) - Seattle Seahawks fullback/linebacker
- Ray Bentley (1985) – Buffalo Bills linebacker, started two Super Bowl games, recent sports radio personality, ABC College Football and NFL on Fox broadcaster
- Novo Bojovic (1984) – St. Louis Cardinals kicker
- John Bonamego (1986) – Los Angeles Rams special teams coordinator and coordinator for five different NFL teams
- Jim Bowman (1984) – AP All-American, New England Patriots free safety, played in Super Bowl, NFL 2nd round draft choice
- Antonio Brown (2009) – 7× Pro Bowl (2011, 2013–2018), 2× First-team All-American (2008, 2009), 2× First-team All-MAC (2008, 2009)
- Tyler Conklin (2018) - New York Jets tight end - drafted in the 5th round
- Titus Davis (2014) – Wide receiver
- Tony Elliott (1984) – Green Bay Packers nickel back and safety
- Eric Fisher (2012) – Kansas City Chiefs offensive tackle - 1st overall pick of the 2013 NFL draft, First-team All-American, First-team All-MAC
- Kavon Frazier (2016) - Dallas Cowboys Safety - drafted in the 5th round
- Eric Ghiaciuc (2004) – Cincinnati Bengals center, 2005 NFL 4th round draft choice
- Josh Gordy (2009) – Defensive back - played for several NFL teams, Super Bowl XLV champion
- Brock Gutierrez (1996) – ten-year NFL veteran at center finishing career with the Detroit Lions
- Brett Hartmann (2010) – Houston Texans punter. Suffered a career-ending injury
- Gary Hogeboom (1979) – NFL quarterback 11 seasons, primarily a backup with the Dallas Cowboys and the Indianapolis Colts; NFL 5th round draft choice; Notable Survivor reality T.V. contestant.
- Tory Humphrey (2004) – New Orleans Saints, Super Bowl champion, tight end.
- Robert Jackson (1981) – Cincinnati Bengals safety, eight seasons and NFL draft choice
- Sean Murphy-Bunting (2018) - Cornerback, First-team All-MAC (2018), 2019 2nd-round draft pick (pick 39 overall) for the Tampa Bay Buccaneers, Super Bowl LV champion
- Jake Olson (2013) – offensive tackle - played 3 CFL seasons
- Jim Podoley (1956) – AP All-American, Washington Redskins running back, Pro Bowl player, NFL 4th round draft choice
- Thomas Rawls (2015) - Running back, formerly of New York Jets & Seattle Seahawks
- Scott Rehberg (1996) – New England Patriots offensive lineman and NFL 7th round draft choice
- Cooper Rush (2017) - Atlanta Falcons quarterback
- Joe Staley (2006) – San Francisco 49ers offensive tackle - 28th pick of the 2007 NFL draft, 6× Pro Bowl (2011–2015,2017)
- L.T. Walton (2015) - Pittsburgh Steelers Defensive end - drafted in the 6th round
- Frank Zombo (2009) - Kansas City Chiefs Linebacker - Super Bowl XLV Starter and Champion, 2x First-team ALL-MAC (2008, 2009)
- Cullen Jenkins (2003) - Green Bay Packers, NY Giants, Washington Redskins and Philadelphia Eagles defensive lineman - Super Bowl XLV Champion

== Retired numbers ==
Central Michigan Chippewas retired numbers
No.	Player	Pos.	Tenure	Ref.
62	Jim Podoley	HB	1952–1956	

== Media ==
=== Radio ===
The CMU Sports Network broadcasts all games live throughout Michigan and online for free.

CMU Sports Network Affiliates:

- 1270 AM WXYT, Detroit
- 1210 AM WJNL, Traverse City
- 98.5 FM WUPS, Houghton Lake/ Mount Pleasant
- 96.1 FM WMAX, Grand Rapids
- 1230 AM WTKG, Grand Rapids
- 1090 AM WKBZ, Muskegon
- 1110 AM WWMN, Petoskey

=== Television ===
The ESPN family of channels and Fox Sports affiliates have provided national and local television coverage.

CMU Sports Zone provides live and archive Internet video-feed of games, gameday coverage, and coaches shows.

== Future non-conference opponents ==
Announced schedules as of July 29, 2026.

2027	2028	2029	2030	2031	2032
at Michigan State (8/28)	at Michigan (9/2)	New Mexico (9/8)	at Michigan State (8/31)	at Michigan (8/30)	at Old Dominion (9/18)
Monmouth (9/3)	at Tennessee (9/9)	at Rutgers (9/15)	Troy (9/7)		
Old Dominion (9/18)	at Troy (9/16)		at San Diego State (9/21)		
at Wyoming (9/25)					
