= Hugh Sutherland (American football) =

American football coach

Coaching career (HC unless noted)
- 1908: Central Michigan

Head coaching record
- Overall: 4–3

Hugh Sutherland was the head coach of the Central Michigan University college football program in 1908.

== Head coaching record ==
Year	Team	Overall	Conference	Standing	Bowl/playoffs
Central Michigan Normalites (Independent) (1908)
1908	Central Michigan	4–3			
Central Michigan:		4–3			
Total:		4–3			
