= Central Michigan–Eastern Michigan football rivalry =

Sports rivalry

- Central Michigan Chippewas Eastern Michigan Eagles
- Sport: Football
- First meeting: November 1, 1902; Central Michigan, 10–0
- Latest meeting: November 4, 2026; Central Michigan, 35–7
- Next meeting: 2027

Statistics
- Total meetings: 104
- All-time series: CMU leads 66–32–6
- Largest victory: EMU 63–0 (1917)
- Longest win streak: CMU, 8 (1937–1947)
- Current win streak: CMU, 2 (2025–present)

Locations of Central Michigan and Eastern Michigan

The Central Michigan–Eastern Michigan football rivalry is an annual college football game between Central Michigan University (CMU) and Eastern Michigan University (EMU). The football series between the two universities dates back to 1902 and is the oldest rivalry in the Mid-American Conference (MAC), having begun five years before the Central Michigan–Western Michigan rivalry and six years before the Miami–Ohio rivalry. With 104 games having been played, it is also the most frequently-played series between MAC schools.

Michigan State Normal, as EMU was then known, dominated the series in the first 25 meetings, compiling a record of 14–8–3 from 1902 to 1936. The tide then shifted to CMU which compiled a 37–5–3 from 1937 to 1992. From 1993 to 2025, CMU has won 20 games to 13 for EMU.

== History ==
=== Early years: 1902–1939 ===
The first game in the rivalry series was played on November 1, 1902, at Ypsilanti, Michigan. Central Michigan, under coach Charles Tambling, won the game by a 10–0 score.

Eastern Michigan, then known as the Michigan State Normal School, achieved its first victory in the series on November 16, 1907. The Ypsilanti team won the game by a score of 38–0. The game was played starting at 9:30 a.m. to allow both teams to attend the Michigan–Michigan Agricultural football game in Ann Arbor.

On October 20, 1917, Michigan State Normal defeated Central by a score of 63 to 0 – the largest margin of victory by either school in the rivalry's long history. The Detroit Free Press reported: "Mt. Pleasant failed to make a first down and gained only about 15 yards in the entire game, their team being light and lacking experience."

From 1925 to 1930, Michigan State Normal compiled a 40–4–2 record under head coach Elton Rynearson. Rynearson's teams won five consecutive games against Central during this period, outscoring Central by a total of 119 to 0. Michigan State Normal dominated the series in the first 25 meetings, compiling a record of 14–8–3 from 1902 to 1936.

=== Middle years: 1937–1992 ===
From 1937 to 1992, the tide shifted heavily in Central Michigan's favor. During that period, Central compiled 37–5–3 record against Eastern Michigan.

In November 1963, the teams terminated the rivalry due to Eastern Michigan's affiliation with the Presidents' Athletic Conference. At the time, the Detroit Free Press called it an "honored . . . rivalry" and "one of Michigan's all-time great collegiate football series." Central Michigan won the 1963 game by a 55–20, leading the UPI to report: "A rivalry that began in 1902 ended somewhat inauspiciously . . ."

After the longest break in the rivalry's history, lasting from 1964 to 1971, the teams met in October 1972 at the new Perry Shorts Stadium in Mount Pleasant. The 1972 match was also the 50th gridiron game between the two schools. Eastern defeated Central, 28–3, as Houston Booth threw three touchdown passes and George Duranko had a 100-yard interception return.

In 1972, Central Michigan won the NCAA Division II championship and defeated Eastern by a score of 28–13. In 1979, Central Michigan won the Mid-America Conference championship, compiled an undefeated record, and defeated Eastern by a 37–14 score.

=== Modern era: 1993–present ===
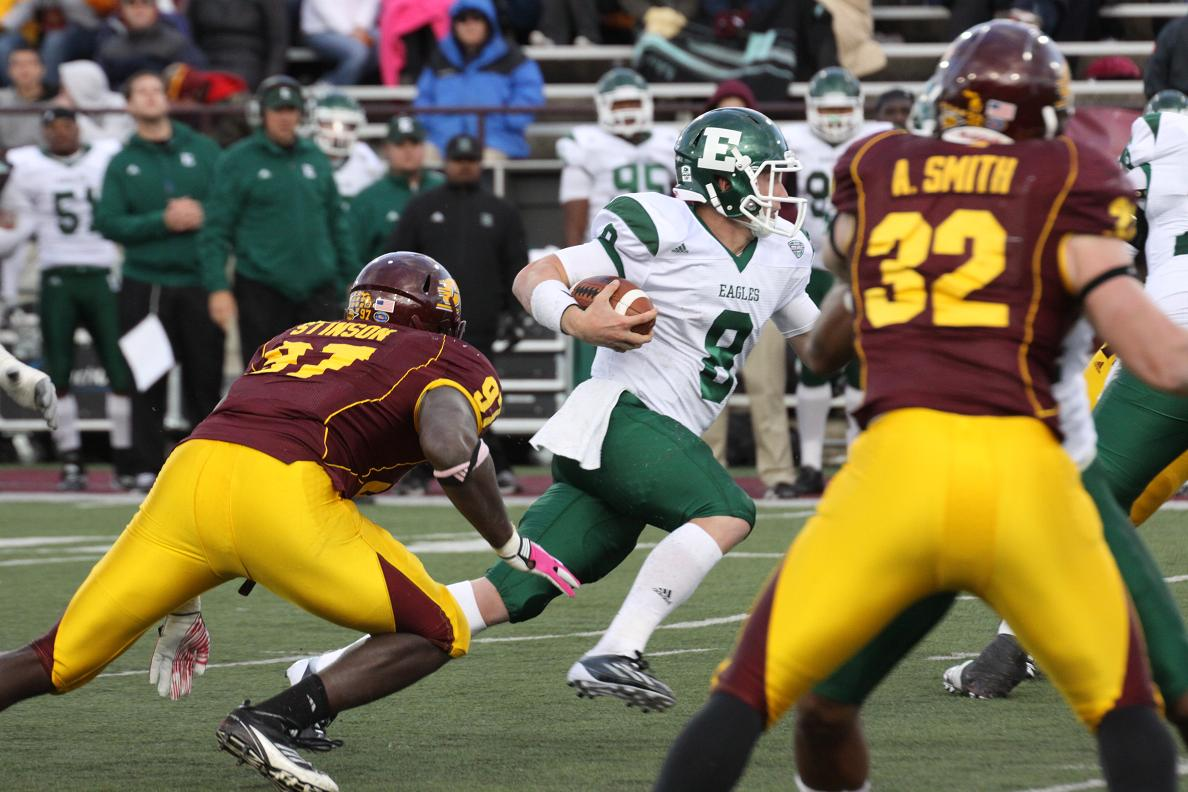
The 2011 edition of the rivalry game at Kelly/Shorts Stadium

From 1993 to 2017, the rivalry again became competitive. During that time, Central Michigan won 15 games to 10 for Eastern Michigan. Central Michigan coach Brian Kelly noted in 2005: "I think the rivalry's when two teams are very competitive. It wasn't much of a rivalry because I think Central had beaten Eastern for a number of years. Now Eastern obviously holds the upper hand ... It creates a real rivalry situation."

In 1995, Charlie Batch, who went on to play in the NFL from 1998 to 2012, ran for three touchdowns and passed for 385 yards to lead Eastern Michigan to a 34–24 victory over Central Michigan.

In 1996, Central Michigan came back from a 27–10 deficit in the second half to win by a 41–36 score. CMU receiver set a school record with 14 receptions for 241 yards.

In 1997, Charlie Batch, playing in his final year of college football, threw three touchdown passes and ran for the winning touchdown as Eastern Michigan defeated Central Michigan, 31–24.

In 2002, Central Michigan's Robbie Mixon broke the MAC single-game record with 377 rushing yards in a 47–21 victory over Eastern Michigan.

In 2004, the teams played at Ford Field in Detroit. In the highest scoring game in the rivalry's history, Eastern Michigan defeated Brian Kelly's Central team by a 61–58 score in five-hour, quadruple overtime game.

In 2005, the Michigan Sports Hall of Fame created the Michigan MAC Trophy awarded annually to the team with the best head-to-head record among Michigan's three Mid-American Conference programs – Central Michigan, Eastern Michigan, and Western Michigan University. Since its inception, Central Michigan has won the Michigan MAC Trophy five times, and Eastern Michigan and Western Michigan have each won it four times.

Days before the 2008 game, Eastern Michigan's head coach Jeff Genyk was fired. During pregame warmups, Central's coach Butch Jones approached one of the Eastern coaches to say "'I know you guys are out of a job and I'm not going to help you' with a few expletives thrown in there." Jones' comments inspired the Eastern players who scored 42 points in the first half and won the game by a 56–52 score. Eastern's quarterback Andy Schmitt also broke Drew Brees' NCAA Division I-A record with 58 pass completions in the game. Genyk credited his team's performance to "the emotion of the rivalry."

In 2011, Ryan Radcliff led Central to two touchdowns and a two-point conversion in the last five-and-a-half minutes to tie the score at 28–28. Eastern Michigan then scored a touchdown with 37 seconds remaining to secure the win. After the game, Eastern coach Ron English said: "The one thing about rivalry games is you have to be able to win them in the end. There are tremendous highs and tremendous lows, but what happens is both sides usually keep playing because it means so much to everybody."

== Game results ==
| Central Michigan victories | Eastern Michigan victories | Tie games |

| No. | Date | Location | Winner | Score |
|---|---|---|---|---|
| 1 | November 1, 1902 | Mount Pleasant | Central Michigan | 10–0 |
| 2 | November 17, 1905 | Mount Pleasant | Central Michigan | 13–0 |
| 3 | November 16, 1907 | Ypsilanti | Michigan State Normal | 38–0 |
| 4 | November 7, 1908 | Mount Pleasant | Central Michigan | 11–0 |
| 5 | November 5, 1909 | Ypsilanti | Michigan State Normal | 17–0 |
| 6 | November 12, 1910 | Mount Pleasant | Central Michigan | 13–0 |
| 7 | November 9, 1912 | Mount Pleasant | Tie | 0–0 |
| 8 | October 20, 1917 | Ypsilanti | Michigan State Normal | 63–0 |
| 9 | November 7, 1919 | Mount Pleasant | Tie | 7–7 |
| 10 | October 16, 1920 | Ypsilanti | Michigan State Normal | 7–6 |
| 11 | October 15, 1921 | Mount Pleasant | Michigan State Normal | 7–6 |
| 12 | November 4, 1922 | Ypsilanti | Tie | 0–0 |
| 13 | October 27, 1923 | Mount Pleasant | Central Michigan | 27–3 |
| 14 | October 25, 1924 | Ypsilanti | Central Michigan | 13–0 |
| 15 | October 23, 1926 | Mount Pleasant | Michigan State Normal | 41–0 |
| 16 | October 29, 1927 | Mount Pleasant | Michigan State Normal | 6–0 |
| 17 | October 27, 1928 | Mount Pleasant | Michigan State Normal | 36–0 |
| 18 | October 26, 1929 | Ypsilanti | Michigan State Normal | 24–0 |
| 19 | October 25, 1930 | Mount Pleasant | Michigan State Normal | 13–0 |
| 20 | October 24, 1931 | Ypsilanti | Central State | 20–12 |
| 21 | October 22, 1932 | Mount Pleasant | Michigan State Normal | 28–0 |
| 22 | October 21, 1933 | Ypsilanti | Michigan State Normal | 13–7 |
| 23 | October 20, 1934 | Mount Pleasant | Central State | 13–12 |
| 24 | October 19, 1935 | Ypsilanti | Michigan State Normal | 7–0 |
| 25 | October 24, 1936 | Mount Pleasant | Michigan State Normal | 13–7 |
| 26 | October 23, 1937 | Ypsilanti | Central Michigan | 27–10 |
| 27 | October 21, 1938 | Mount Pleasant | Central Michigan | 7–6 |
| 28 | October 21, 1939 | Ypsilanti | Central Michigan | 14–0 |
| 29 | October 25, 1940 | Mount Pleasant | Central Michigan | 24–0 |
| 30 | October 24, 1941 | Ypsilanti | Central Michigan | 12–6 |
| 31 | October 16, 1942 | Mount Pleasant | Central Michigan | 14–0 |
| 32 | October 19, 1946 | Ypsilanti | Central Michigan | 26–13 |
| 33 | November 1, 1947 | Mount Pleasant | Central Michigan | 33–0 |
| 34 | November 6, 1948 | Ypsilanti | Michigan State Normal | 6–0 |
| 35 | November 4, 1949 | Mount Pleasant | Central Michigan | 18–7 |
| 36 | October 28, 1950 | Ypsilanti | Central Michigan | 26–7 |
| 37 | October 20, 1951 | Ypsilanti | Central Michigan | 19–13 |
| 38 | October 25, 1952 | Mount Pleasant | Central Michigan | 26–7 |
| 39 | November 14, 1953 | Ypsilanti | Tie | 33–33 |
| 40 | November 13, 1954 | Mount Pleasant | Central Michigan | 28–7 |
| 41 | November 5, 1955 | Ypsilanti | Central Michigan | 27–20 |
| 42 | November 3, 1956 | Mount Pleasant | Central Michigan | 19–0 |
| 43 | October 11, 1957 | Ypsilanti | Eastern Michigan | 39–6 |
| 44 | October 11, 1958 | Mount Pleasant | Central Michigan | 7–6 |
| 45 | October 17, 1959 | Ypsilanti | Central Michigan | 21–8 |
| 46 | October 15, 1960 | Mount Pleasant | Central Michigan | 28–0 |
| 47 | October 21, 1961 | Ypsilanti | Central Michigan | 13–11 |
| 48 | October 20, 1962 | Mount Pleasant | Central Michigan | 24–0 |
| 49 | November 2, 1963 | Ypsilanti | Central Michigan | 55–20 |
| 50 | November 18, 1972 | Mount Pleasant | Eastern Michigan | 28–3 |
| 51 | November 3, 1973 | Mount Pleasant | Central Michigan | 31–21 |
| 52 | November 2, 1974 | Ypsilanti | Central Michigan | 28–13 |
| 53 | October 11, 1975 | Mount Pleasant | Central Michigan | 20–7 |

| No. | Date | Location | Winner | Score |
|---|---|---|---|---|
| 54 | November 6, 1976 | Ypsilanti | Eastern Michigan | 30–27 |
| 55 | September 10, 1977 | Mount Pleasant | Central Michigan | 9–3 |
| 56 | November 11, 1978 | Ypsilanti | Central Michigan | 41–9 |
| 57 | November 10, 1979 | Mount Pleasant | Central Michigan | 37–14 |
| 58 | November 1, 1980 | Ypsilanti | Central Michigan | 51–15 |
| 59 | October 3, 1981 | Mount Pleasant | Central Michigan | 63–14 |
| 60 | October 2, 1982 | Ypsilanti | Central Michigan | 13–8 |
| 61 | October 8, 1983 | Mount Pleasant | Central Michigan | 24–3 |
| 62 | October 6, 1984 | Ypsilanti | Tie | 16–16 |
| 63 | October 26, 1985 | Mount Pleasant | Central Michigan | 17–10 |
| 64 | October 25, 1986 | Ypsilanti | Eastern Michigan | 34–16 |
| 65 | October 10, 1987 | Mount Pleasant | Central Michigan | 16–6 |
| 66 | October 8, 1988 | Ypsilanti | Central Michigan | 20–6 |
| 67 | October 28, 1989 | Mount Pleasant | Central Michigan | 24–9 |
| 68 | October 27, 1990 | Ypsilanti | Central Michigan | 16–12 |
| 69 | November 2, 1991 | Ypsilanti | Tie | 14–14 |
| 70 | November 7, 1992 | Mount Pleasant | Central Michigan | 30–13 |
| 71 | October 16, 1993 | Mount Pleasant | Eastern Michigan | 28–21 |
| 72 | September 17, 1994 | Ypsilanti | Central Michigan | 30–29 |
| 73 | October 7, 1995 | Ypsilanti | Eastern Michigan | 34–24 |
| 74 | October 19, 1996 | Mount Pleasant | Central Michigan | 41–36 |
| 75 | September 27, 1997 | Mount Pleasant | Eastern Michigan | 31–24 |
| 76 | October 10, 1998 | Ypsilanti | Central Michigan | 36–23 |
| 77 | November 13, 1999 | Mount Pleasant | Central Michigan | 29–26 |
| 78 | November 4, 2000 | Ypsilanti | Eastern Michigan | 31–15 |
| 79 | November 10, 2001 | Mount Pleasant | Central Michigan | 35–30 |
| 80 | November 2, 2002 | Ypsilanti | Central Michigan | 47–21 |
| 81 | November 1, 2003 | Mount Pleasant | Central Michigan | 38–10 |
| 82 | November 6, 2004 | Detroit | Eastern Michigan | 61–58 |
| 83 | September 24, 2005 | Mount Pleasant | Eastern Michigan | 23–20 |
| 84 | September 23, 2006 | Ypsilanti | Central Michigan | 24–17 |
| 85 | November 16, 2007 | Mount Pleasant | Eastern Michigan | 48–45 |
| 86 | November 28, 2008 | Ypsilanti | Eastern Michigan | 56–52 |
| 87 | October 10, 2009 | Mount Pleasant | Central Michigan | 56–8 |
| 88 | September 18, 2010 | Ypsilanti | Central Michigan | 52–14 |
| 89 | October 15, 2011 | Mount Pleasant | Eastern Michigan | 35–28 |
| 90 | November 10, 2012 | Ypsilanti | Central Michigan | 34–31 |
| 91 | November 29, 2013 | Mount Pleasant | Central Michigan | 42–10 |
| 92 | November 1, 2014 | Ypsilanti | Central Michigan | 38–7 |
| 93 | November 27, 2015 | Mount Pleasant | Central Michigan | 35–28 |
| 94 | November 22, 2016 | Ypsilanti | Eastern Michigan | 26–21 |
| 95 | November 8, 2017 | Mount Pleasant | Central Michigan | 42–30 |
| 96 | November 3, 2018 | Ypsilanti | Eastern Michigan | 17–7 |
| 97 | October 5, 2019 | Mount Pleasant | Central Michigan | 42–16 |
| 98 | November 27, 2020 | Ypsilanti | Central Michigan | 31–23 |
| 99 | November 26, 2021 | Mount Pleasant | Central Michigan | 31–10 |
| 100 | November 25, 2022 | Ypsilanti | Eastern Michigan | 38–19 |
| 101 | September 30, 2023 | Mount Pleasant | Central Michigan | 26–23 |
| 102 | October 19, 2024 | Ypsilanti | Eastern Michigan | 38–34 |
| 103 | September 27, 2025 | Mount Pleasant | Central Michigan | 24–13 |
| 104 | November 4, 2026 | Detroit | Central Michigan | 35–7 |
Series: Central Michigan leads 66–32–6

== See also ==
- List of NCAA college football rivalry games
- List of most-played college football series in NCAA Division I
- Michigan MAC Trophy
