= Central Michigan–Western Michigan football rivalry =

American college football rivalry

- Central Michigan Chippewas Western Michigan Broncos
- Sport: Football
- First meeting: October 19, 1907; Western State, 29–0
- Latest meeting: October 17, 2026; Western Michigan, 21–14
- Next meeting: 2027
- Trophy: Victory Cannon

Statistics
- Total meetings: 97
- All-time series: WMU leads 55–40–2
- Trophy series: WMU leads 12–7
- Largest victory: WMU, 54–0 (1930)
- Longest win streak: WMU, 13 (1928–1944)
- Current win streak: WMU, 2 (2025–present)

Locations of Central Michigan and Western Michigan

The Central Michigan–Western Michigan football rivalry is an annual college football game between Central Michigan University (CMU) and Western Michigan University (WMU). The winner receives the Victory Cannon. In its first appearance, it was awarded to CMU after the October 18, 2008, game.

== History ==
The teams first played each other in 1907, and Western held the title until 1910. They did not meet again for another 15 years until 1925, when they met in Kalamazoo, and the game ended in a tie.

Central picked up its first win in 1927, but Western dominated the rivalry from 1928 to 1952, taking victory in 20 of 21 games.

Starting in 1975, Central Michigan held a 27–16–1 edge against Western. Central Michigan kept its winning record until 1994, losing only twice to the Broncos, in 1988 and 1992.

Western Michigan earned back a series of consecutive wins from 2001 to 2003.

== Victory Cannon ==
A cannon, which represents the cannons fired at both CMU's Kelly/Shorts Stadium and WMU's Waldo Stadium, sits atop the trophy, and each of the schools' wins are noted on both sides. The trophy was first awarded in 2008.

Western Michigan ended the Chippewas five year winning streak with a 30-point win in 2011, and backed it up with a win in 2012, the Broncos' first win in Mount Pleasant since 2002. Although the Broncos lead the all-time series 55–40–2, since both teams began competing together in the NCAA Division I in 1975, Central Michigan leads the series 29–22–1. However, since the adoption of the Victory Cannon trophy, Western Michigan leads the series 12–7.

== Game results ==
| Central Michigan victories | Western Michigan victories | Tie games |

| No. | Date | Location | Winner | Score |
|---|---|---|---|---|
| 1 | October 19, 1907 | Mount Pleasant, Michigan | Western State | 29–0 |
| 2 | November 21, 1908 | Kalamazoo, Michigan | Western State | 11–5 |
| 3 | November 19, 1909 | Mount Pleasant, Michigan | Western State | 11–0 |
| 4 | November 4, 1910 | Kalamazoo, Michigan | Western State | 16–6 |
| 5 | November 6, 1925 | Kalamazoo, Michigan | Tie | 0–0 |
| 6 | October 22, 1927 | Mount Pleasant, Michigan | Central Michigan | 18–12 |
| 7 | November 24, 1928 | Kalamazoo, Michigan | Western State | 19–0 |
| 8 | November 9, 1929 | Mount Pleasant, Michigan | Western State | 25–6 |
| 9 | October 10, 1930 | Kalamazoo, Michigan | Western State | 54–0 |
| 10 | November 21, 1931 | Mount Pleasant, Michigan | Western State | 7–6 |
| 11 | November 5, 1932 | Kalamazoo, Michigan | Western State | 7–0 |
| 12 | November 4, 1933 | Mount Pleasant, Michigan | Western State | 19–0 |
| 13 | November 3, 1934 | Kalamazoo, Michigan | Western State | 13–0 |
| 14 | November 9, 1935 | Mount Pleasant, Michigan | Western State | 13–0 |
| 15 | November 7, 1936 | Kalamazoo, Michigan | Western State | 33–0 |
| 16 | November 6, 1937 | Mount Pleasant, Michigan | Western State | 7–0 |
| 17 | November 12, 1938 | Kalamazoo, Michigan | Western State | 35–0 |
| 18 | September 18, 1943 | Mount Pleasant, Michigan | Western Michigan | 19–0 |
| 19 | October 7, 1944 | Kalamazoo, Michigan | Western Michigan | 35–14 |
| 20 | September 29, 1945 | Mount Pleasant, Michigan | Central Michigan | 6–0 |
| 21 | November 2, 1946 | Kalamazoo, Michigan | Western Michigan | 27–21 |
| 22 | October 11, 1947 | Mount Pleasant, Michigan | Western Michigan | 20–12 |
| 23 | October 9, 1948 | Kalamazoo, Michigan | Western Michigan | 7–0 |
| 24 | October 22, 1949 | Mount Pleasant, Michigan | Western Michigan | 35–8 |
| 25 | September 30, 1950 | Kalamazoo, Michigan | Western Michigan | 21–13 |
| 26 | November 17, 1951 | Kalamazoo, Michigan | Western Michigan | 46–25 |
| 27 | October 4, 1952 | Mount Pleasant, Michigan | Western Michigan | 18–0 |
| 28 | September 26, 1953 | Mount Pleasant, Michigan | Central Michigan | 21–0 |
| 29 | September 25, 1954 | Kalamazoo, Michigan | Central Michigan | 25–19 |
| 30 | September 24, 1955 | Mount Pleasant, Michigan | Central Michigan | 27–12 |
| 31 | September 22, 1956 | Kalamazoo, Michigan | Central Michigan | 14–7 |
| 32 | September 21, 1957 | Mount Pleasant, Michigan | Western Michigan | 33–0 |
| 33 | September 20, 1958 | Kalamazoo, Michigan | Central Michigan | 33–32 |
| 34 | September 19, 1959 | Mount Pleasant, Michigan | Central Michigan | 21–15 |
| 35 | September 17, 1960 | Kalamazoo, Michigan | Western Michigan | 31–0 |
| 36 | September 16, 1961 | Mount Pleasant, Michigan | Western Michigan | 27–21 |
| 37 | September 15, 1962 | Kalamazoo, Michigan | Western Michigan | 28–0 |
| 38 | September 28, 1963 | Mount Pleasant, Michigan | Central Michigan | 30–14 |
| 39 | September 26, 1964 | Kalamazoo, Michigan | Central Michigan | 18–6 |
| 40 | September 25, 1965 | Mount Pleasant, Michigan | Western Michigan | 21–13 |
| 41 | September 24, 1966 | Kalamazoo, Michigan | Western Michigan | 31–14 |
| 42 | September 13, 1969 | Kalamazoo, Michigan | Western Michigan | 24–0 |
| 43 | September 12, 1970 | Mount Pleasant, Michigan | Western Michigan | 41–0 |
| 44 | September 8, 1973 | Mount Pleasant, Michigan | Western Michigan | 18–13 |
| 45 | November 9, 1974 | Kalamazoo, Michigan | Central Michigan | 42–6 |
| 46 | September 6, 1975 | Mount Pleasant, Michigan | Central Michigan | 34–0 |
| 47 | November 20, 1976 | Kalamazoo, Michigan | Western Michigan | 42–14 |
| 48 | November 19, 1977 | Mount Pleasant, Michigan | Central Michigan | 28–23 |
| 49 | November 18, 1978 | Kalamazoo, Michigan | Central Michigan | 35–14 |

| No. | Date | Location | Winner | Score |
|---|---|---|---|---|
| 50 | September 8, 1979 | Mount Pleasant, Michigan | Central Michigan | 10–0 |
| 51 | November 15, 1980 | Kalamazoo, Michigan | Central Michigan | 22–10 |
| 52 | October 10, 1981 | Kalamazoo, Michigan | Central Michigan | 15–13 |
| 53 | October 9, 1982 | Mount Pleasant, Michigan | Tie | 18–18 |
| 54 | September 24, 1983 | Kalamazoo, Michigan | Central Michigan | 32–14 |
| 55 | September 22, 1984 | Mount Pleasant, Michigan | Central Michigan | 38–19 |
| 56 | October 12, 1985 | Kalamazoo, Michigan | Central Michigan | 24–17 |
| 57 | October 11, 1986 | Mount Pleasant, Michigan | Central Michigan | 18–10 |
| 58 | October 31, 1987 | Mount Pleasant, Michigan | Central Michigan | 30–27 |
| 59 | October 29, 1988 | Kalamazoo, Michigan | Western Michigan | 42–24 |
| 60 | October 14, 1989 | Kalamazoo, Michigan | Central Michigan | 34–6 |
| 61 | October 13, 1990 | Mount Pleasant, Michigan | Central Michigan | 20–13 |
| 62 | November 16, 1991 | Mount Pleasant, Michigan | Central Michigan | 27–17 |
| 63 | November 14, 1992 | Kalamazoo, Michigan | Western Michigan | 19–14 |
| 64 | October 9, 1993 | Kalamazoo, Michigan | Central Michigan | 23–18 |
| 65 | October 8, 1994 | Mount Pleasant, Michigan | Central Michigan | 35–28 |
| 66 | November 18, 1995 | Kalamazoo, Michigan | Western Michigan | 48–31 |
| 67 | September 21, 1996 | Mount Pleasant, Michigan | Central Michigan | 38–28 |
| 68 | November 8, 1997 | Kalamazoo, Michigan | Western Michigan | 38–24 |
| 69 | October 24, 1998 | Mount Pleasant, Michigan | Central Michigan | 26–24 |
| 70 | October 2, 1999 | Kalamazoo, Michigan | Western Michigan | 38–16 |
| 71 | November 11, 2000 | Mount Pleasant, Michigan | Central Michigan | 21–17 |
| 72 | November 17, 2001 | Kalamazoo, Michigan | Western Michigan | 20–17 |
| 73 | November 23, 2002 | Mount Pleasant, Michigan | Western Michigan | 35–10 |
| 74 | November 15, 2003 | Kalamazoo, Michigan | Western Michigan | 44–21 |
| 75 | October 30, 2004 | Mount Pleasant, Michigan | Central Michigan | 24–21 |
| 76 | November 12, 2005 | Kalamazoo, Michigan | Western Michigan | 31–24 |
| 77 | November 10, 2006 | Mount Pleasant, Michigan | Central Michigan | 31–7 |
| 78 | November 6, 2007 | Kalamazoo, Michigan | Central Michigan | 34–31 |
| 79 | October 18, 2008 | Mount Pleasant, Michigan | Central Michigan | 38–28 |
| 80 | October 17, 2009 | Kalamazoo, Michigan | Central Michigan | 34–23 |
| 81 | November 5, 2010 | Mount Pleasant, Michigan | Central Michigan | 26–22 |
| 82 | September 17, 2011 | Kalamazoo, Michigan | Western Michigan | 44–14 |
| 83 | November 3, 2012 | Mount Pleasant, Michigan | Western Michigan | 42–31 |
| 84 | November 16, 2013 | Kalamazoo, Michigan | Central Michigan | 27–22 |
| 85 | November 22, 2014 | Mount Pleasant, Michigan | Western Michigan | 32–20 |
| 86 | October 10, 2015 | Kalamazoo, Michigan | Western Michigan | 41–39 |
| 87 | October 1, 2016 | Mount Pleasant, Michigan | Western Michigan | 49–10 |
| 88 | November 1, 2017 | Kalamazoo, Michigan | Central Michigan | 35–28 |
| 89 | October 20, 2018 | Mount Pleasant, Michigan | Western Michigan | 35–10 |
| 90 | September 28, 2019 | Kalamazoo, Michigan | Western Michigan | 31–15 |
| 91 | November 18, 2020 | Mount Pleasant, Michigan | Western Michigan | 52–44 |
| 92 | November 3, 2021 | Kalamazoo, Michigan | Central Michigan | 42–30 |
| 93 | November 16, 2022 | Mount Pleasant, Michigan | Western Michigan | 12–10 |
| 94 | November 7, 2023 | Kalamazoo, Michigan | Western Michigan | 38–28 |
| 95 | November 19, 2024 | Mount Pleasant, Michigan | Central Michigan | 16–14 |
| 96 | November 1, 2025 | Kalamazoo, Michigan | Western Michigan | 24–21 |
| 97 | October 17, 2026 | Mount Pleasant, Michigan | Western Michigan | 21–14 |
Series: Western Michigan leads 55–40–2

== See also ==
- List of NCAA college football rivalry games
- Michigan MAC Trophy
