= 1968 Ball State Cardinals football team =

American college football season

1968 Ball State Cardinals football
- Conference: Independent
- Record: 5–4
- Head coach: Wave Myers (1st season)
- Home stadium: Ball State Stadium

1968 NCAA College Division independents football records
	Conf.			Overall
Team	W	L	T	W		L		T
No. 2 San Diego State		–		9	–	0	–	1
No. 3 Chattanooga		–		9	–	1	–	0
Indiana State		–		9	–	1	–	0
Indiana (PA)		–		9	–	1	–	0
Nevada Southern		–		8	–	1	–	0
Ashland		–		8	–	2	–	0
No. 7 Eastern Michigan		–		8	–	2	–	0
Lincoln (MO)		–		8	–	2	–	0
St. Norbert		–		6	–	2	–	1
Tennessee State		–		6	–	2	–	1
UC Riverside		–		6	–	2	–	1
Hawaii		–		7	–	3	–	0
No. 14 Tampa		–		7	–	3	–	0
No. 17 Akron		–		7	–	3	–	1
Northeastern		–		6	–	3	–	0
Southern Illinois		–		6	–	3	–	0
Cortland		–		5	–	3	–	0
Boston University		–		5	–	3	–	1
Northern Arizona		–		6	–	4	–	0
Pacific (CA)		–		6	–	4	–	0
Samford		–		6	–	4	–	0
Northern Michigan		–		5	–	4	–	0
Parsons		–		5	–	4	–	0
Wheaton (IL)		–		5	–	4	–	0
Drake		–		5	–	5	–	0
UC Santa Barbara		–		4	–	4	–	1
Santa Clara		–		4	–	5	–	0
Portland State		–		4	–	6	–	0
Wayne State (MI)		–		3	–	6	–	0
Wabash		–		3	–	6	–	0
Colorado College		–		2	–	6	–	0
Kentucky State		–		2	–	7	–	0
Milwaukee		–		2	–	7	–	0
Lake Forest		–		2	–	8	–	0
Northern Illinois		–		2	–	8	–	0
Mississippi Valley State		–		1	–	7	–	0
UC San Diego		–		0	–	7	–	0
Rose Poly		–		0	–	8	–	0
Cal Poly Pomona		–		0	–	10	–	0
Rankings from AP small college poll

The 1968 Ball State Cardinals football team was an American football team that represented Ball State University as an independent during the 1968 NCAA College Division football season. In its first season under head coach Wave Myers, the team compiled a 5–4 record. The team played its home games at Ball State Stadium in Muncie, Indiana.

== Schedule ==
Date	Opponent	Site	Result	Attendance	Source
September 14	Northern Illinois	Ball State Stadium; Muncie, IN (rivalry, Band Day)	L 20–40	15,500–15,560	
September 21	at Bowling Green	Doyt Perry Stadium; Bowling Green, OH	L 8–62	16,129	
September 28	Valparaiso	Ball State Stadium; Muncie, IN	W 26–11	5,716	
October 5	at Evansville	Reitz Bowl; Evansville, IN	W 26–3	3,500	
October 12	Eastern Michigan^{†}	Ball State Stadium; Muncie, IN	L 7–43	16,850–17,700	
October 19	DePauw	Ball State Stadium; Muncie, IN	W 17–12	4,060	
October 26	at Butler	Butler Bowl; Indianapolis, IN	W 24–21	8,875	
November 2	Indiana State	Ball State Stadium; Muncie, IN (Blue Key Victory Bell)	L 14–20	13,200	
November 9	at Saint Joseph's	Rensselaer, IN	W 47–6	2,700	
^{†}Homecoming
