= 1968 Drake Bulldogs football team =

American college football season

1968 Drake Bulldogs football
- Conference: Independent
- Record: 5–5
- Head coach: Jack Wallace (4th season)
- Home stadium: Drake Stadium

1968 NCAA College Division independents football records
| | Conf. | | | Overall |
| Team | W | L | T | W | | L | | T |
|---|---|---|---|---|---|---|---|---|
| No. 2 San Diego State | | – | | 9 | – | 0 | – | 1 |
| No. 3 Chattanooga | | – | | 9 | – | 1 | – | 0 |
| Indiana State | | – | | 9 | – | 1 | – | 0 |
| Indiana (PA) | | – | | 9 | – | 1 | – | 0 |
| Nevada Southern | | – | | 8 | – | 1 | – | 0 |
| Ashland | | – | | 8 | – | 2 | – | 0 |
| No. 7 Eastern Michigan | | – | | 8 | – | 2 | – | 0 |
| Lincoln (MO) | | – | | 8 | – | 2 | – | 0 |
| St. Norbert | | – | | 6 | – | 2 | – | 1 |
| Tennessee State | | – | | 6 | – | 2 | – | 1 |
| UC Riverside | | – | | 6 | – | 2 | – | 1 |
| Hawaii | | – | | 7 | – | 3 | – | 0 |
| No. 14 Tampa | | – | | 7 | – | 3 | – | 0 |
| No. 17 Akron | | – | | 7 | – | 3 | – | 1 |
| Northeastern | | – | | 6 | – | 3 | – | 0 |
| Southern Illinois | | – | | 6 | – | 3 | – | 0 |
| Cortland | | – | | 5 | – | 3 | – | 0 |
| Boston University | | – | | 5 | – | 3 | – | 1 |
| Northern Arizona | | – | | 6 | – | 4 | – | 0 |
| Pacific (CA) | | – | | 6 | – | 4 | – | 0 |
| Samford | | – | | 6 | – | 4 | – | 0 |
| Northern Michigan | | – | | 5 | – | 4 | – | 0 |
| Parsons | | – | | 5 | – | 4 | – | 0 |
| Wheaton (IL) | | – | | 5 | – | 4 | – | 0 |
| Drake | | – | | 5 | – | 5 | – | 0 |
| UC Santa Barbara | | – | | 4 | – | 4 | – | 1 |
| Santa Clara | | – | | 4 | – | 5 | – | 0 |
| Portland State | | – | | 4 | – | 6 | – | 0 |
| Illinois College | | – | | 2 | – | 4 | – | 2 |
| Wayne State (MI) | | – | | 3 | – | 6 | – | 0 |
| Wabash | | – | | 3 | – | 6 | – | 0 |
| Colorado College | | – | | 2 | – | 6 | – | 0 |
| Kentucky State | | – | | 2 | – | 7 | – | 0 |
| Milwaukee | | – | | 2 | – | 7 | – | 0 |
| Lake Forest | | – | | 2 | – | 8 | – | 0 |
| Northern Illinois | | – | | 2 | – | 8 | – | 0 |
| Mississippi Valley State | | – | | 1 | – | 7 | – | 0 |
| UC San Diego | | – | | 0 | – | 7 | – | 0 |
| Rose Poly | | – | | 0 | – | 8 | – | 0 |
| Cal Poly Pomona | | – | | 0 | – | 10 | – | 0 |
Rankings from AP small college poll

The 1968 Drake Bulldogs football team was an American football team that represented Drake University as an independent during the 1968 NCAA College Division football season. In its fourth season under head coach Jack Wallace, the team compiled a 5–5 record and was outscored by a total of 278 to 266.

The team's statistical leaders included quarterback Gary McCoy (2,161 passing yards), tailback Bob Misner (610 rushing yards), and split end Dick Hewins (1,316 receiving yards, 78 points scored).

The team played its home games at Drake Stadium in Des Moines, Iowa.

== Schedule ==
| Date | Opponent | Site | Result | Attendance | Source |
|---|---|---|---|---|---|
| September 14 | Northern Arizona | Drake Stadium; Des Moines, IA | W 30–14 | 5,000 | |
| September 21 | Arkansas State | Drake Stadium; Des Moines, IA | L 14–46 | 9,000 | |
| September 28 | Quantico Marines | Drake Stadium; Des Moines, IA | L 31–33 | 5,700 | |
| October 5 | at Wichita State | Veterans Field; Wichita, KS | W 26–23 | 4,813 | |
| October 12 | at State College of Iowa | O. R. Latham Stadium; Cedar Falls, IA | L 19–21 | 7,000 | |
| October 19 | at Nebraska–Omaha | Omaha, NE | W 32–14 | 10,000 | |
| October 26 | Southern Illinois | Drake Stadium; Des Moines, IA | L 20–21 | 10,000 | |
| November 2 | at South Dakota | Inman Field; Vermillion, SD | L 28–49 | 5,000 | |
| November 16 | South Dakota State | Drake Stadium; Des Moines, IA | W 28–20 | 1,000 | |
| November 23 | at Louisville | Fairgrounds Stadium; Louisville, KY | W 38–37 | 6,110 | |
