= 1968 North Texas State Mean Green football team =

American college football season

1968 North Texas State Mean Green football
- Conference: Missouri Valley Conference
- Record: 8–2 (4–1 MVC)
- Head coach: Rod Rust (2nd season)
- Home stadium: Fouts Field

1968 Missouri Valley Conference football standings
	Conf.					Overall
Team	W		L		T	W		L		T
Memphis State $	5	–	0	–	0	6	–	4	–	0
North Texas State	4	–	1	–	0	8	–	2	–	0
Cincinnati	3	–	2	–	0	5	–	4	–	1
Louisville	2	–	3	–	0	5	–	5	–	0
Tulsa	2	–	3	–	0	3	–	7	–	0
Wichita State	0	–	5	–	0	0	–	10	–	0
$ – Conference champion; Memphis State's game against Southern Miss and Cincinnati's game against Miami (OH) counted in the conference standings.

The 1968 North Texas State Mean Green football team was an American football team that represented North Texas State University (now known as the University of North Texas) during the 1968 NCAA University Division football season as a member of the Missouri Valley Conference. In their second year under head coach Rod Rust, the team compiled a 8–2 record.

Defensive tackle Joe Greene was a consensus pick for the 1968 All-America team. Greene would be selected by the Pittsburgh Steelers 4th overall in the 1969 NFL/AFL draft. North Texas would retire Greene's no. 75 jersey in 1981 and induct him into the UNT Hall of Fame. Greene would be enshrined in the College Football Hall of Fame three years later in 1984.

Barry Moore ranked among the national leaders with 69 receptions (sixth nationally) for 1,053 yards (ninth nationally.

== Schedule ==
Date	Opponent	Site	Result	Attendance	Source
September 21	New Mexico State*	Fouts Field; Denton, TX	W 47–20	9,217–9,500	
September 28	at Colorado State*	Hughes Stadium; Fort Collins, CO	W 17–12	22,000	
October 5	Memphis State	Fouts Field; Denton, TX	L 12–30	12,800	
October 12	Northern Michigan*	Fouts Field; Denton, TX	W 17–3	8,500	
October 19	at Tulsa	Skelly Field; Tulsa, OK	W 20–17	26,250	
October 26	at No. 16 Arkansas*	War Memorial Stadium; Little Rock, AR	L 15–17	45,000–45,802	
November 2	Cincinnati^{†}	Fouts Field; Denton, TX	W 55–34	18,500–19,000	
November 9	at UTEP*	Sun Bowl; El Paso, TX	W 34–31	20,160	
November 16	at Louisville	Fairgrounds Stadium; Louisville, KY	W 36–14	6,000	
November 23	at Wichita State	Veterans Field; Wichita, KS	W 44–6	6,537	
*Non-conference game; ^{†}Homecoming; Rankings from AP Poll released prior to the game

== Game summaries ==
=== At No. 16 Arkansas ===
	1	2	3	4	Total
Mean Green	0	3	0	12	15
No. 16 Razorbacks	0	10	7	0	17
