= Dick Towers =

American football coach (1931–2023)

Biographical details
- Born: February 10, 1931; Kansas City, Kansas, U.S.
- Died: April 23, 2023 (aged 92); Manhattan, Kansas, U.S.

Playing career
- 1950–1952: Kansas State
- Position: Halfback

Coaching career (HC unless noted)
- 1955–1957: Leavenworth HS (KS)
- 1958–1962: Manhattan HS (KS)
- 1963: Hutchinson
- 1964–1965: Kansas State (OB)
- 1966: Southern Illinois (assistant)
- 1967–1973: Southern Illinois
- 1974–1976: Duke (OB)

Administrative career (AD unless noted)
- 1981–1985: Kansas State

Head coaching record
- Overall: 29–37–2 (college); 8–2 (junior college)

Accomplishments and honors

Championships
- 1 KJCCC (1963)

Richard Ephraim Towers (February 10, 1931 – April 23, 2023) was an American football coach and college athletics administrator. He was the 12th head football coach at Southern Illinois University Carbondale, serving for seven seasons, from 1967 to 1973. He compiled a record of 29–37–2. Towers was the athletic director at Kansas State University from 1981 to 1985, Iowa State associate athletic director 1986–1989.

A native of Olathe, Kansas, Towers attended Kansas State University, where he played football as a halfback and ran track, competing in the half-mile and 400 metres hurdles. He was an All-American for the Kansas State Wildcats track and field team, placing 8th in the mile run at the 1952 NCAA track and field championships.

Towers died from complications of multiple myeloma in Manhattan, Kansas, on April 23, 2023. He was 92.

== Head coaching record ==
=== College ===
Year	Team	Overall	Conference	Standing	Bowl/playoffs
Southern Illinois Salukis (NCAA College Division / Division I independent) (1967–1973)
1967	Southern Illinois	3–7			
1968	Southern Illinois	6–3			
1969	Southern Illinois	5–5			
1970	Southern Illinois	6–3			
1971	Southern Illinois	6–4			
1972	Southern Illinois	1–8–1			
1973	Southern Illinois	3–7–1			
Southern Illinois:		29–37–2			
Total:		29–37–2			

=== Junior college ===
Year	Team	Overall	Conference	Standing	Bowl/playoffs
Hutchinson Blue Dragons (Kansas Jayhawk Community College Conference) (1963)
1963	Hutchinson	8–2	7–1	T–1st	
Hutchinson:		8–2	7–1		
Total:		8–2			
National championship Conference title Conference division title or championship game berth
