= 1968 Indiana State Sycamores football team =

American college football season

1968 Indiana State Sycamores football
- Conference: Independent
- Record: 9–1
- Head coach: Jerry Huntsman (3rd season)
- Home stadium: Memorial Stadium

1968 NCAA College Division independents football records
	Conf.			Overall
Team	W	L	T	W		L		T
No. 2 San Diego State		–		9	–	0	–	1
No. 3 Chattanooga		–		9	–	1	–	0
Indiana State		–		9	–	1	–	0
Indiana (PA)		–		9	–	1	–	0
Nevada Southern		–		8	–	1	–	0
Ashland		–		8	–	2	–	0
No. 7 Eastern Michigan		–		8	–	2	–	0
Lincoln (MO)		–		8	–	2	–	0
St. Norbert		–		6	–	2	–	1
Tennessee State		–		6	–	2	–	1
UC Riverside		–		6	–	2	–	1
Hawaii		–		7	–	3	–	0
No. 14 Tampa		–		7	–	3	–	0
No. 17 Akron		–		7	–	3	–	1
Northeastern		–		6	–	3	–	0
Southern Illinois		–		6	–	3	–	0
Cortland		–		5	–	3	–	0
Boston University		–		5	–	3	–	1
Northern Arizona		–		6	–	4	–	0
Pacific (CA)		–		6	–	4	–	0
Samford		–		6	–	4	–	0
Northern Michigan		–		5	–	4	–	0
Parsons		–		5	–	4	–	0
Wheaton (IL)		–		5	–	4	–	0
Drake		–		5	–	5	–	0
UC Santa Barbara		–		4	–	4	–	1
Santa Clara		–		4	–	5	–	0
Portland State		–		4	–	6	–	0
Wayne State (MI)		–		3	–	6	–	0
Wabash		–		3	–	6	–	0
Colorado College		–		2	–	6	–	0
Kentucky State		–		2	–	7	–	0
Milwaukee		–		2	–	7	–	0
Lake Forest		–		2	–	8	–	0
Northern Illinois		–		2	–	8	–	0
Mississippi Valley State		–		1	–	7	–	0
UC San Diego		–		0	–	7	–	0
Rose Poly		–		0	–	8	–	0
Cal Poly Pomona		–		0	–	10	–	0
Rankings from AP small college poll

The 1968 Indiana State Sycamores football team represented Indiana State University in the 1968 NCAA College Division football season. It was the third season of head coach Jerry Huntsman's tenure and his finest season as the head of the ISU program. It was the first nine-win season in the history of the program and remains only one of three such seasons. It is the winningest season in the history of the program with a .900 winning percentage. Future NFLer Jim Brumfield was a member of the squad as was future Indiana State University Hall of Famer Verbie Walder

It marked the first season since 1950 the Sycamores were not a member of a conference. A charter member of the Indiana Collegiate Conference; Indiana State resigned from the conference prior to the football season; in a bit of irony, the Sycamores would defeat every former conference foe; this after finishing 2nd in each of the previous two seasons.

Six Sycamores set school records during the season, Verbie Walder would set a school record for total offense (1,102 yards); Jim Brumfield, increased his career scoring record to 114 points, in addition to setting new records in rushing (single game) with 182 yards (vs. DePauw) and rushing (season) with 916. Dean Klink established a new school career rushing record at 1,496; he remains at #11 in school history. Steve Schmid established a new single season record for touchdown reception (8), it would be tied in 2015 (by Gary Ownes) and be broken by (Robert Tonyan) in 2016. Schmid also set new marks in career receptions (69) and receiving yards (814). Both records have since fallen.

On the defensive side of the field; Butch Penn set a new school record with a 95-yard interception return and Mike Russell intercepted nine passes on the season - exceeding the entire ISU team in 1967.

Two team records were also set; total points scored (274) and most interceptions (25). Head Coach Jerry Huntsman was named the NCAA District Coach of the Year.

Despite the team strong finish; the earlier loss to Akron, kept the Sycamores from a berth in the Grantland Rice Bowl. Ironically, Akron received the berth; largely on their win vs. the Sycamores.

== Schedule ==
Date	Time	Opponent	Site	Result	Attendance	Source
September 14	2:00 pm	at Eastern Illinois	Lincoln Field; Charleston, IL	W 23–0	5,000	
September 21	8:00 pm	at Akron	Rubber Bowl; Akron, OH	L 13–41	43,068	
September 28	1:30 pm	at Butler	Butler Bowl; Indianapolis, IN	W 28–12	4,100	
October 5	2:00 pm	Northern Illinois	Memorial Stadium; Terre Haute, IN	W 19–7	4,000–5,602	
October 12	2:00 pm	Saint Joseph's (IN)^{†}	Memorial Stadium; Terre Haute, IN	W 48–6	14,378	
October 19	1:30 pm	at Valparaiso	Brown Field; Valparaiso, IN	W 28–0	6,978	
October 26	2:00 pm	Evansville	Memorial Stadium; Terre Haute, IN	W 40–14	6,120	
November 2	2:00 pm	at Ball State	Ball State Stadium; Muncie, IN	W 20–14	13,200	
November 9	2:00 pm	DePauw	Memorial Stadium; Terre Haute, IN	W 41–17	8,803	
November 16	2:00 pm	at Western Illinois	Hanson Field; Macomb, IL	W 14–10	3,900	
^{†}Homecoming; All times are in Eastern time
