= Walt Hackett =

American football player and coach

- Hackett, c. 1961

Biographical details
- Born: c. 1923; Tuscola, Illinois, U.S.
- Died: April 24, 1971 (aged 47); Long Beach, California, U.S.

Playing career
- c. 1949: Whittier
- Position: Tackle

Coaching career (HC unless noted)
- 1956: Bellflower HS (CA)
- 1957–1958: Cerritos (assistant)
- 1959–1961: Baylor (assistant)
- 1962–1966: San Diego Chargers (DL)
- 1968: UC San Diego
- 1969–1970: Pittsburgh Steelers (DL)

Walter W. Hackett (c. 1923 – April 24, 1971) was an American football coach. He served as the defensive line coach for the San Diego Chargers of the American Football League (AFL) from 1962 to 1966 and the Pittsburgh Steelers of the National Football League (NFL) from 1969 to 1970. Hackett was the head football coach at the University of California, San Diego during that school's lone season with a football program, in 1968.

Hackett attended Ramona High School in Ramona, San Diego County, California, where he played high school football. He played four years of college football at Whittier College in Whittier, California under head coach Wallace Newman. Hackett died at the age of 47, on April 24, 1971, in Long Beach, California, after collapsing as he prepared to scout the Long Beach State football team.

== Head coaching record ==
Year	Team	Overall	Conference	Standing	Bowl/playoffs
UC San Diego Tritons (Independent) (1968)
1968	UC San Diego	0–7			
UC San Diego:		0–7			
Total:		0–7			
