= Gordon K. Larson =

Biographical details
- Born: June 15, 1924; Akron, Ohio, U.S.
- Died: June 12, 2005 (aged 80); The Villages, Florida, U.S.

Playing career

Basketball
- 1942–1943: Bowling Green

Coaching career (HC unless noted)

Football
- 1950s: Twinsburg HS (OH)
- 1959–1960: Ohio State (assistant)
- 1961–1972: Akron

Administrative career (AD unless noted)
- 1970–1984: Akron

Head coaching record
- Overall: 74–33–5 (college)
- Bowls: 0–1

Gordon K. Larson (June 15, 1924 – June 12, 2005) was an American football coach and college athletics administrator in Ohio. He served as the head coach at the University of Akron from 1961 to 1972, compiling a record of 74–33–5. Larson's 74 wins are second most in the history of the Akron Zips football program, trailing only the 80 tallied by his assistant and successor, Jim Dennison. Larson died at the age of 80 on June 12, 2005, at his home in The Villages, Florida.

== Head coaching record ==
=== College ===
Year	Team	Overall	Conference	Standing	Bowl/playoffs
Akron Zips (Ohio Athletic Conference) (1961–1965)
1961	Akron	6–2	6–1	2nd	
1962	Akron	7–2	7–1	2nd	
1963	Akron	6–3	5–2	5th	
1964	Akron	6–3	4–3	T–4th	
1965	Akron	5–3–1	4–1	T–2nd	
Akron Zips (NCAA College Division independent) (1966–1972)
1966	Akron	6–3			
1967	Akron	4–4–1			
1968	Akron	7–3–1			L Grantland Rice
1969	Akron	9–1			
1970	Akron	7–3			
1971	Akron	8–2			
1972	Akron	3–4–2			
Akron:		74–33–5	26–8		
Total:		74–33–5			
