= 1968 Northern Illinois Huskies football team =

American college football season

1968 Northern Illinois Huskies football
- Conference: Independent
- Record: 2–8
- Head coach: Howard Fletcher (13th season)
- Offensive coordinator: Bill Peck (4th season)
- MVPs: John Spilis; James Faggetti
- Captains: John Spilis; James Faggetti
- Home stadium: Huskie Stadium

1968 NCAA College Division independents football records
	Conf.			Overall
Team	W	L	T	W		L		T
No. 2 San Diego State		–		9	–	0	–	1
No. 3 Chattanooga		–		9	–	1	–	0
Indiana State		–		9	–	1	–	0
Indiana (PA)		–		9	–	1	–	0
Nevada Southern		–		8	–	1	–	0
Ashland		–		8	–	2	–	0
No. 7 Eastern Michigan		–		8	–	2	–	0
Lincoln (MO)		–		8	–	2	–	0
St. Norbert		–		6	–	2	–	1
Tennessee State		–		6	–	2	–	1
UC Riverside		–		6	–	2	–	1
Hawaii		–		7	–	3	–	0
No. 14 Tampa		–		7	–	3	–	0
No. 17 Akron		–		7	–	3	–	1
Northeastern		–		6	–	3	–	0
Southern Illinois		–		6	–	3	–	0
Cortland		–		5	–	3	–	0
Boston University		–		5	–	3	–	1
Northern Arizona		–		6	–	4	–	0
Pacific (CA)		–		6	–	4	–	0
Samford		–		6	–	4	–	0
Northern Michigan		–		5	–	4	–	0
Parsons		–		5	–	4	–	0
Wheaton (IL)		–		5	–	4	–	0
Drake		–		5	–	5	–	0
UC Santa Barbara		–		4	–	4	–	1
Santa Clara		–		4	–	5	–	0
Portland State		–		4	–	6	–	0
Wayne State (MI)		–		3	–	6	–	0
Wabash		–		3	–	6	–	0
Colorado College		–		2	–	6	–	0
Kentucky State		–		2	–	7	–	0
Milwaukee		–		2	–	7	–	0
Lake Forest		–		2	–	8	–	0
Northern Illinois		–		2	–	8	–	0
Mississippi Valley State		–		1	–	7	–	0
UC San Diego		–		0	–	7	–	0
Rose Poly		–		0	–	8	–	0
Cal Poly Pomona		–		0	–	10	–	0
Rankings from AP small college poll

The 1968 Northern Illinois Huskies football team represented Northern Illinois University as an independent during the 1968 NCAA College Division football season. Led by Howard Fletcher in his 13th and final season as head coach, the Huskies compiled a record of 2–8. Northern Illinois played home games at Huskie Stadium in DeKalb, Illinois.

== Schedule ==
Date	Opponent	Site	Result	Attendance	Source
September 14	at Ball State	Ball State Stadium; Muncie, IN (rivalry)	W 40–20	15,500–15,560	
September 20	at San Diego State	San Diego Stadium; San Diego, CA	L 21–40	30,560	
September 28	No. 3 North Dakota State	Huskie Stadium; DeKalb, IL	L 13–31	17,797	
October 5	at Indiana State	Memorial Stadium; Terre Haute, IN	L 7–19	4,000–5,602	
October 12	Northern Arizona	Huskie Stadium; DeKalb, IL	L 14–43	12,162	
October 19	Xavier	Huskie Stadium; DeKalb, IL	L 20–24	8,247	
October 26	New Mexico State	Huskie Stadium; DeKalb, IL	L 13–27	18,339	
November 9	Buffalo	Huskie Stadium; DeKalb, IL	L 7–20	15,153	
November 16	Bowling Green	Huskie Stadium; DeKalb, IL	W 7–6	8,700–8,800	
November 23	at No. 17 (UD) Ohio	Doyt Perry Stadium; Bowling Green, OH	L 12–28	18,206	
Rankings from AP Poll released prior to the game
