= 1968 Tulsa Golden Hurricane football team =

American college football season

1968 Tulsa Golden Hurricane football
- Conference: Missouri Valley Conference
- Record: 3–7 (2–3 MVC)
- Head coach: Glenn Dobbs (8th season)
- Home stadium: Skelly Stadium

1968 Missouri Valley Conference football standings
	Conf.					Overall
Team	W		L		T	W		L		T
Memphis State $	5	–	0	–	0	6	–	4	–	0
North Texas State	4	–	1	–	0	8	–	2	–	0
Cincinnati	3	–	2	–	0	5	–	4	–	1
Louisville	2	–	3	–	0	5	–	5	–	0
Tulsa	2	–	3	–	0	3	–	7	–	0
Wichita State	0	–	5	–	0	0	–	10	–	0
$ – Conference champion; Memphis State's game against Southern Miss and Cincinnati's game against Miami (OH) counted in the conference standings.

The 1968 Tulsa Golden Hurricane football team represented the University of Tulsa during the 1968 NCAA University Division football season. In their eighth year under head coach Glenn Dobbs, the Golden Hurricane compiled a 3–7 record, 2–3 against conference opponents, and finished in fifth place in the Missouri Valley Conference.

The team's statistical leaders included Mike Stripling with 1,968 passing yards and 307 rushing yards and Harry Wood with 988 receiving yards.

The most notable member of this team was middle linebacker Phillip "Dr. Phil" McGraw.

== Schedule ==
Date	Opponent	Site	Result	Attendance	Source
September 28	at Arkansas*	Razorback Stadium; Fayetteville, AR	L 13–56	41,000–41,712	
October 5	Southern Illinois*	Skelly Field; Tulsa, OK	W 20–3	21,700	
October 12	at Louisville	Fairgrounds Stadium; Louisville, KY	L 7–16	11,132	
October 19	North Texas State	Skelly Stadium; Tulsa, OK	L 17–20	26,250	
October 26	at Cincinnati	Nippert Stadium; Cincinnati, OH	W 34–27	15,569	
November 2	Memphis State^{†}	Skelly Stadium; Tulsa, OK	L 6–32	11,900	
November 9	Tulane*	Tulane Stadium; New Orleans, LA	L 15–25	10,260	
November 16	at Air Force*	Falcon Stadium; Colorado Springs, CO	L 8–28	32,175	
November 23	at No. 11 Houston*	Houston Astromome; Houston, TX	L 6–100	34,098	
November 28	Wichita State	Skelly Stadium; Tulsa, OK	W 23–7	8,000	
*Non-conference game; ^{†}Homecoming; Rankings from Coaches' Poll released prior to the game

== After the season ==
=== 1969 NFL/AFL draft ===
The following Golden Hurricane players were selected in the 1969 NFL/AFL draft following the season.

Round	Pick	Player	Position	Club
3	55	Al Jenkins	Guard	Cleveland Browns (NFL)
8	202	Chuck Reynolds	Center	Cleveland Browns (NFL)
9	213	Mike Stripling	Running back	Cincinnati Bengals (AFL)
15	370	Brant Conley	Running back	Boston Patriots (AFL)
