= 1968 Southern Illinois Salukis football team =

American college football season

1968 Southern Illinois Salukis football
- Conference: Independent
- Record: 6–3
- Head coach: Dick Towers (2nd season)
- Home stadium: McAndrew Stadium

1968 NCAA College Division independents football records
| | Conf. | | | Overall |
| Team | W | L | T | W | | L | | T |
|---|---|---|---|---|---|---|---|---|
| No. 2 San Diego State | | – | | 9 | – | 0 | – | 1 |
| No. 3 Chattanooga | | – | | 9 | – | 1 | – | 0 |
| Indiana State | | – | | 9 | – | 1 | – | 0 |
| Indiana (PA) | | – | | 9 | – | 1 | – | 0 |
| Nevada Southern | | – | | 8 | – | 1 | – | 0 |
| Ashland | | – | | 8 | – | 2 | – | 0 |
| No. 7 Eastern Michigan | | – | | 8 | – | 2 | – | 0 |
| Lincoln (MO) | | – | | 8 | – | 2 | – | 0 |
| St. Norbert | | – | | 6 | – | 2 | – | 1 |
| Tennessee State | | – | | 6 | – | 2 | – | 1 |
| UC Riverside | | – | | 6 | – | 2 | – | 1 |
| Hawaii | | – | | 7 | – | 3 | – | 0 |
| No. 14 Tampa | | – | | 7 | – | 3 | – | 0 |
| No. 17 Akron | | – | | 7 | – | 3 | – | 1 |
| Northeastern | | – | | 6 | – | 3 | – | 0 |
| Southern Illinois | | – | | 6 | – | 3 | – | 0 |
| Cortland | | – | | 5 | – | 3 | – | 0 |
| Boston University | | – | | 5 | – | 3 | – | 1 |
| Northern Arizona | | – | | 6 | – | 4 | – | 0 |
| Pacific (CA) | | – | | 6 | – | 4 | – | 0 |
| Samford | | – | | 6 | – | 4 | – | 0 |
| Northern Michigan | | – | | 5 | – | 4 | – | 0 |
| Parsons | | – | | 5 | – | 4 | – | 0 |
| Wheaton (IL) | | – | | 5 | – | 4 | – | 0 |
| Drake | | – | | 5 | – | 5 | – | 0 |
| UC Santa Barbara | | – | | 4 | – | 4 | – | 1 |
| Santa Clara | | – | | 4 | – | 5 | – | 0 |
| Portland State | | – | | 4 | – | 6 | – | 0 |
| Illinois College | | – | | 2 | – | 4 | – | 2 |
| Wayne State (MI) | | – | | 3 | – | 6 | – | 0 |
| Wabash | | – | | 3 | – | 6 | – | 0 |
| Colorado College | | – | | 2 | – | 6 | – | 0 |
| Kentucky State | | – | | 2 | – | 7 | – | 0 |
| Milwaukee | | – | | 2 | – | 7 | – | 0 |
| Lake Forest | | – | | 2 | – | 8 | – | 0 |
| Northern Illinois | | – | | 2 | – | 8 | – | 0 |
| Mississippi Valley State | | – | | 1 | – | 7 | – | 0 |
| UC San Diego | | – | | 0 | – | 7 | – | 0 |
| Rose Poly | | – | | 0 | – | 8 | – | 0 |
| Cal Poly Pomona | | – | | 0 | – | 10 | – | 0 |
Rankings from AP small college poll

The 1968 Southern Illinois Salukis football team was an American football team that represented Southern Illinois University (now known as Southern Illinois University Carbondale) as an independent during the 1968 NCAA College Division football season. Under second-year head coach Dick Towers, the team compiled a 6–3 record. The team played its home games at McAndrew Stadium in Carbondale, Illinois.

== Schedule ==
| Date | Opponent | Site | Result | Attendance | Source |
|---|---|---|---|---|---|
| September 21 | Louisville | McAndrew Stadium; Carbondale, IL | L 10–33 | 7,000 | |
| October 5 | at Tulsa | Skelly Stadium; Tulsa, OK | L 3–20 | 21,700 | |
| October 12 | Lamar Tech | McAndrew Stadium; Carbondale, IL | W 24–7 | 7,500 | |
| October 19 | at Dayton | Baujan Field; Dayton, OH | W 18–17 | 14,600–14,613 | |
| October 26 | at Drake | Drake Stadium; Des Moines, IA | W 21–20 | 10,000 | |
| November 2 | Youngstown State | McAndrew Stadium; Carbondale, IL | L 15–18 | 14,000 | |
| November 9 | Northern Michigan | McAndrew Stadium; Carbondale, IL | W 23–20 | 4,000 | |
| November 16 | at Tampa | Tampa Stadium; Tampa, FL | W 23–20 | 23,260 | |
| November 22 | vs. Southwest Missouri State | Busch Stadium (Gateway Classic); St. Louis, MO | W 68–6 | 5,507 | |
