= 1968 North Carolina A&T Aggies football team =

American college football season

1968 North Carolina A&T Aggies football

Black college national co-champion
- Conference: Central Intercollegiate Athletic Association
- Record: 8–1 (6–1 CIAA)
- Head coach: Hornsby Howell (1st season)
- Home stadium: World War Memorial Stadium

1968 Central Intercollegiate Athletic Association football standings
	Conf.					Overall
Team	W		L		T	W		L		T
No. 12 Morgan State $	7	–	1	–	0	8	–	1	–	0
No. 14 North Carolina A&T	6	–	1	–	0	8	–	1	–	0
North Carolina College	6	–	2	–	0	6	–	2	–	0
Elizabeth City State	7	–	1	–	0	8	–	1	–	0
Maryland State	3	–	2	–	1	5	–	2	–	1
Virginia State	5	–	2	–	1	5	–	2	–	1
Hampton	4	–	2	–	1	4	–	3	–	2
Livingstone	4	–	3	–	0	4	–	4	–	0
Howard	2	–	3	–	0	3	–	5	–	0
Norfolk State	2	–	4	–	1	2	–	5	–	1
Johnson C. Smith	3	–	3	–	0	5	–	4	–	0
Virginia Union	2	–	6	–	0	3	–	6	–	0
Delaware State	2	–	4	–	0	4	–	6	–	0
Winston-Salem State	2	–	5	–	1	3	–	5	–	1
Fayetteville State	2	–	5	–	0	2	–	5	–	0
Shaw	1	–	7	–	1	1	–	7	–	1
Saint Paul's (VA)	0	–	7	–	0	1	–	7	–	0
$ – Conference champion; Conference standings were based on the Dickinson System.; Rankings from NAIA poll for North Carolina A&T and AP small college poll for Morgan State

The 1968 North Carolina A&T College Aggies football team represented the Agricultural and Technical College of North Carolina—now known as North Carolina A&T State University—as a member of the Central Intercollegiate Athletic Association (CIAA) during the 1968 NCAA College Division football season. The team was led by first-year head coach Hornsby Howell and played their home games at World War Memorial Stadium in Greensboro, North Carolina. The Aggies finished the season 8–1 overall and 6–1 in conference play, placing second in the CIAA. North Carolina A&T won its first black college football national championship.

== Previous season ==
In the previous season, the Aggies finished the season 3–5–1. The aggies lost conference games against: Norfolk, Maryland Eastern Shore, Morgan State and FAMU.

== Schedule ==
Date	Opponent	Site	Result	Attendance	Source
September 28	South Carolina State*	World War Memorial Stadium; Greensboro, NC (rivalry)	W 20–15	10,000	
October 5	at Johnson C. Smith	American Legion Memorial Stadium; Charlotte, NC	W 21–17	6,224	
October 12	Norfolk State	World War Memorial Stadium; Greensboro, NC	W 61–14		
September 19	at Maryland State	Princess Anne, MD	L 6–9		
October 26	at Winston-Salem State	Bowman Gray Stadium; Winston-Salem, NC (rivalry)	W 60–0		
November 2	Morgan State	World War Memorial Stadium; Greensboro, NC	W 7–6	14,000	
November 9	at Florida A&M*	Bragg Memorial Stadium; Tallahassee, FL	W 9–6		
November 16	Virginia State	War Memorial Stadium; Greensboro, NC	W 33–7		
November 28	at North Carolina College	Durham County Memorial Stadium; Durham, NC (rivalry)	W 21–6	11,500	
*Non-conference game; Source:

== Postseason ==
=== 1969 NFL/AFL Draft ===
The 1969 NFL/AFL draft was held on January 28–29, 1969 at the Belmont Plaza Hotel in New York, New York. The following A&T players were either selected or signed as undrafted free agents following the draft.

Player	Position	Round	Overall Pick	NFL team
Willie Pearson	Defensive Back	5	115	Miami Dolphins
