= 1968 Memphis State Tigers football team =

American college football season

1968 Memphis State Tigers football

MVC champion
- Conference: Missouri Valley Conference
- Record: 6–4 (5–0 MVC)
- Head coach: Billy J. Murphy (11th season)
- Home stadium: Memphis Memorial Stadium

1968 Missouri Valley Conference football standings
	Conf.					Overall
Team	W		L		T	W		L		T
Memphis State $	5	–	0	–	0	6	–	4	–	0
North Texas State	4	–	1	–	0	8	–	2	–	0
Cincinnati	3	–	2	–	0	5	–	4	–	1
Louisville	2	–	3	–	0	5	–	5	–	0
Tulsa	2	–	3	–	0	3	–	7	–	0
Wichita State	0	–	5	–	0	0	–	10	–	0
$ – Conference champion; Memphis State's game against Southern Miss and Cincinnati's game against Miami (OH) counted in the conference standings.

The 1968 Memphis State Tigers football team represented Memphis State University (now known as the University of Memphis) as a member of the Missouri Valley Conference (MVC) during the 1968 NCAA University Division football season. In its 11th season under head coach Billy J. Murphy, the team compiled a 6–4 record (5–0 against conference opponents), won the MVC championship, and outscored opponents by a total of 258 to 170. The team played home games at Memphis Memorial Stadium in Memphis, Tennessee.

The team's statistical leaders included Danny Pierce with 925 passing yards, Ray Jamieson with 573 rushing yards, Preston Riley with 484 receiving yards, and Jay McCoy with 60 points scored.

== Schedule ==
Date	Opponent	Site	Result	Attendance	Source
September 21	Ole Miss*	Memphis Memorial Stadium; Memphis, TN (rivalry)	L 7–21	51,046	
September 28	at No. 16 Tennessee*	Neyland Stadium; Knoxville, TN	L 17–24	61,792	
October 5	at North Texas State	Fouts Field; Denton, TX	W 30–12	12,800	
October 12	West Texas State*	Memphis Memorial Stadium; Memphis, TN	W 42–21	25,027	
October 19	at Florida State*	Doak Campbell Stadium; Tallahassee, FL	L 10–20	30,182	
October 26	Southern Miss (Note: Memphis State's game against Southern Miss counted in the MVC standings.)	Memphis Memorial Stadium; Memphis, TN (Black and Blue Bowl)	W 29–7	30,080	
November 2	at Tulsa	Skelly Field; Tulsa, OK	W 32–6	11,900	
November 9	No. 13 Houston*	Memphis Memorial Stadium; Memphis, TN	L 7–27	35,592	
November 16	Wichita State	Memphis Memorial Stadium; Memphis, TN	W 40–18	13,334	
November 30	at Louisville	Fairgrounds Stadium; Louisville, KY (rivalry)	W 44–14	5,024	
*Non-conference game; Rankings from AP Poll released prior to the game
