= 1968 Louisville Cardinals football team =

American college football season

1968 Louisville Cardinals football
- Conference: Missouri Valley Conference
- Record: 5–5 (2–3 MVC)
- Head coach: Frank Camp (23rd season)
- Home stadium: Fairgrounds Stadium

1968 Missouri Valley Conference football standings
	Conf.					Overall
Team	W		L		T	W		L		T
Memphis State $	5	–	0	–	0	6	–	4	–	0
North Texas State	4	–	1	–	0	8	–	2	–	0
Cincinnati	3	–	2	–	0	5	–	4	–	1
Louisville	2	–	3	–	0	5	–	5	–	0
Tulsa	2	–	3	–	0	3	–	7	–	0
Wichita State	0	–	5	–	0	0	–	10	–	0
$ – Conference champion; Memphis State's game against Southern Miss and Cincinnati's game against Miami (OH) counted in the conference standings.

The 1968 Louisville Cardinals football team was an American football team that represented the University of Louisville in the Missouri Valley Conference (MVC) during the 1968 NCAA University Division football season. In their 23rd and final season under head coach Frank Camp, the Cardinals compiled a 5–5 record (2–3 against conference opponents) and were outscored by a total of 233 to 192.

The team's statistical leaders included QB Wally Oyler completing 46.7% of passes for 1,410 passing yards and 19 interceptions. RB Herbie Phelps with 468 rushing yards (4.9 yards per carry) and 36 points scored. TE Rick Getch and WR Larry Hart each had 25 receptions for 315 and 375 yards respectively.

== Schedule ==
Date	Opponent	Site	Result	Attendance	Source
September 21	at Southern Illinois*	McAndrew Stadium; Carbondale, IL	W 33–10	7,000	
October 5	at Dayton*	Baujan Field; Dayton, OH	L 14–28	12,238	
October 12	Tulsa	Fairgrounds Stadium; Louisville, KY	W 16–7	11,132	
October 19	at Marshall*	Fairfield Stadium; Huntington, WV	W 13–10	4,500	
October 26	at Wichita State	Veterans Stadium; Wichita, KS	W 21–14	6,309	
November 2	Kent State*	Fairgrounds Stadium; Louisville, KY	W 23–9	8,000	
November 9	at Cincinnati	Nippert Stadium; Cincinnati, OH (The Keg of Nails)	L 7–37	10,123	
November 16	North Texas State	Fairgrounds Stadium; Louisville, KY	L 14–36	6,000	
November 23	Drake*	Fairgrounds Stadium; Louisville, KY	L 37–38	6,110	
November 30	Memphis State	Fairgrounds Stadium; Louisville, KY (rivalry)	L 14–44	5,024	
*Non-conference game

== Roster ==
1968 Louisville Cardinals football team roster
Players
Coaches
Offense

Pos.	#	Name	Class
RB	46	Lee Bouggess	Jr
TE	86	Cookie Brinkman	So
QB	16	Wally Oyler	Sr
C	50	Cleo Walker	Jr

Defense

Pos.	#	Name	Class
DT	74	Horace Jones	So

Special teams

Pos.	#	Name	Class

Head coach

- Frank Camp

Coordinators/assistant coaches

Legend

- (C) Team captain
- (S) Suspended
- (I) Ineligible
- Injured
- Redshirt
