= 1968 Cincinnati Bearcats football team =

American college football season

1968 Cincinnati Bearcats football
- Conference: Missouri Valley Conference
- Record: 5–4–1 (3–2 MVC)
- Head coach: Homer Rice (2nd season)
- Captains: Greg Cook; Milt Balkum
- Home stadium: Nippert Stadium

1968 Missouri Valley Conference football standings
	Conf.					Overall
Team	W		L		T	W		L		T
Memphis State $	5	–	0	–	0	6	–	4	–	0
North Texas State	4	–	1	–	0	8	–	2	–	0
Cincinnati	3	–	2	–	0	5	–	4	–	1
Louisville	2	–	3	–	0	5	–	5	–	0
Tulsa	2	–	3	–	0	3	–	7	–	0
Wichita State	0	–	5	–	0	0	–	10	–	0
$ – Conference champion; Memphis State's game against Southern Miss and Cincinnati's game against Miami (OH) counted in the conference standings.

The 1968 Cincinnati Bearcats football team represented University of Cincinnati as a member of the (MVC) during the 1968 NCAA University Division football season. Led by second-year head coach Homer Rice, the Bearcats compiled an overall record of 5–4–1 with a mark of 3–2 in conference play, placing third in the MVC. The team played home games at Nippert Stadium in Cincinnati.

== Schedule ==
Date	Opponent	Site	Result	Attendance	Source
September 21	at Texas Tech*	Jones Stadium; Lubbock, TX	T 10–10	35,200–35,258	
September 28	Xavier*	Nippert Stadium; Cincinnati, OH (rivalry)	W 17–14	21,991	
October 4	at No. 12 Houston*	Houston Astrodome; Houston, TX	L 33–71	31,881	
October 12	Tampa*	Nippert Stadium; Cincinnati, OH	W 31–28	11,307	
October 19	at Wichita State	Veterans Field; Wichita, KS	W 40–27	8,000	
October 26	Tulsa^{†}	Nippert Stadium; Cincinnati, OH	L 27–34	15,569	
November 2	at North Texas State	Fouts Field; Denton, TX	L 34–55	18,500–19,000	
November 9	Louisville	Nippert Stadium; Cincinnati, OH (rivalry)	W 37–7	10,123	
November 16	No. 17 Ohio*	Nippert Stadium; Cincinnati, OH	L 48–60	9,690	
November 23	Miami (OH) (Note: Cincinnati's game against Miami (OH) counted in the MVC standings.)	Nippert Stadium; Cincinnati, OH (Victory Bell)	W 23–21	13,028	
*Non-conference game; ^{†}Homecoming; Rankings from AP Poll released prior to the game

== Roster ==
1968 Cincinnati Bearcats football team roster
Players
Coaches
Offense

Pos.	#	Name	Class
QB	12	Greg Cook	Sr
WR	88	Jim O'Brien	Jr
RB	20	Lloyd Pate	Sr

Defense

Pos.	#	Name	Class

Special teams

Pos.	#	Name	Class

Head coach

- Homer Rice

Coordinators/assistant coaches

Legend

- (C) Team captain
- (S) Suspended
- (I) Ineligible
- Injured
- Redshirt
