= 1968 Wichita State Shockers football team =

American college football season

1968 Wichita State Shockers football
- Conference: Missouri Valley Conference
- Record: 0–10 (0–5 MVC)
- Head coach: Eddie Kriwiel (1st season)
- Home stadium: Veterans Field

1968 Missouri Valley Conference football standings
	Conf.					Overall
Team	W		L		T	W		L		T
Memphis State $	5	–	0	–	0	6	–	4	–	0
North Texas State	4	–	1	–	0	8	–	2	–	0
Cincinnati	3	–	2	–	0	5	–	4	–	1
Louisville	2	–	3	–	0	5	–	5	–	0
Tulsa	2	–	3	–	0	3	–	7	–	0
Wichita State	0	–	5	–	0	0	–	10	–	0
$ – Conference champion; Memphis State's game against Southern Miss and Cincinnati's game against Miami (OH) counted in the conference standings.

The 1968 Wichita Shockers football team was an American football team that represented Wichita State University as a member of the Missouri Valley Conference during the 1968 NCAA University Division football season. In its first season under head coach Eddie Kriwiel, the team compiled a 0–10 record (0–5 against conference opponents), finished in last place out of six teams in the MVC, and was outscored by a total of 342 to 131. The team played its home games at Veterans Field, now known as Cessna Stadium.

== Schedule ==
Date	Opponent	Site	Result	Attendance	Source
September 21	at West Texas State*	Buffalo Bowl; Canyon, TX	L 0–26	15,100	
September 28	at Utah State*	Romney Stadium; Logan, UT	L 0–38	10,324	
October 5	Drake*	Veterans Field; Wichita, KS	L 23–26	4,813	
October 12	Colorado State*	Veterans Field; Wichita, KS	L 15–37	8,226	
October 19	Cincinnati	Veterans Field; Wichita, KS	L 27–40	8,000	
October 26	Louisville	Veterans Field; Wichita, KS	L 14–21	6,309	
November 9	at New Mexico State*	Memorial Stadium; Las Cruces, NM	L 21–47	7,300	
November 16	at Memphis State	Memphis Memorial Stadium; Memphis, TN	L 18–40	13,334	
November 23	North Texas State	Veterans Field; Wichita, KS	L 6–44	6,537	
November 28	at Tulsa	Skelly Field; Tulsa, OK	L 7–23	8,000	
*Non-conference game
