= 1968 Grantland Rice Bowl =

- 1968 Program cover
Akron Zips	Louisiana Tech Bulldogs
(7–2–1)	(8–2)
Independent	Gulf States Conference
13	33
Head coach: Gordon K. Larson	Head coach: Maxie Lambright
	1	2	3	4	Total
Akron	0	7	6	0	13
Louisiana Tech	21	0	0	12	33
- Date: December 14, 1968
- Season: 1968
- Stadium: Horace Jones Field
- Location: Murfreesboro, Tennessee
- MVP: Terry Bradshaw (QB, La. Tech)
- Attendance: 2,500

The 1968 Grantland Rice Bowl was an NCAA College Division game following the 1968 season, between the Akron Zips and the Louisiana Tech Bulldogs. This was the last time that the Grantland Rice Bowl was played in Murfreesboro, Tennessee.

== Notable participants ==
Louisiana Tech quarterback Terry Bradshaw was selected first in the 1970 NFL draft by the Pittsburgh Steelers. His teammates Larry Brewer and Tommy Spinks were also drafted. Bradshaw and Spinks are inductees of their university's athletic hall of fame, as is head coach Maxie Lambright. Bradshaw is an inductee of both the College Football Hall of Fame and the Pro Football Hall of Fame.

The Akron squad has been designated a Team of Distinction by their university's sports hall of fame; head coach Gordon K. Larson was inducted to the hall in 1975, running back John "Jack" Beidleman was inducted in 1980, and quarterback Don Zwisler was inducted in 1981.

== Scoring summary ==
Scoring summary

Quarter	Time	Drive			Team	Scoring information	Score	
Quarter	Time	Plays	Yards	TOP	Team	Scoring information	Akron	La. Tech
1	8:00	4	41		La. Tech	Terry Bradshaw 16-yard touchdown run, Richie Golmon kick good	0	7
1	3:23	6	67		La. Tech	Tommy Spinks 36-yard touchdown reception from Terry Bradshaw, Richie Golmon kick good	0	14
1	1:17		10		La. Tech	Buster Herren 2-yard touchdown run, Richie Golmon kick good	0	21
2	1:50	4	8		Akron	John Vargo 1-yard touchdown run, John Harrison kick good	7	21
3	5:38	19	80	9:30	Akron	John Beidleman 13-yard touchdown run, John Harrison kick no good (blocked)	13	21
4		10	62		La. Tech	Larry Brewer 6-yard touchdown reception from Terry Bradshaw, Richie Golmon kick no good	13	27
4	9:45	5	46		La. Tech	Terry Bradshaw 8-yard touchdown run, 2-point pass failed	13	33
"TOP" = time of possession. For other American football terms, see Glossary of American football.							13	33

=== Statistics ===
	1	2	3	4	Total
Zips	0	7	6	0	13
Bulldogs	21	0	0	12	33

Statistics	Akron	La. Tech
First downs	14	21
Total offense, yards	196	347
Rushes-yards (net)	54–118	36–86
Passing yards (net)	78	261
Passes, Comp-Att-Int	6–21–3	19–33–2
Time of Possession		

Team	Category	Player	Statistics
Akron	Passing	Don Zwisler	
Akron	Rushing	Ron Lemon	18 car, 75 yds
Akron	Receiving	Dan Ruff	4 rec, 56 yds
La. Tech	Passing	Terry Bradshaw	19/33, 261 yds, 2 TD, 2 INT
La. Tech	Rushing	Terry Bradshaw	12 car, 35 yds, 2 TD
La. Tech	Receiving	Tommy Spinks	12 rec, 167 yds, 1 TD
