= 1968 UC San Diego Tritons football team =

American college football season

1968 UC San Diego Tritons football
- Conference: Independent
- Record: 0–7
- Head coach: Walt Hackett (1st season)

1968 NCAA College Division independents football records
	Conf.			Overall
Team	W	L	T	W		L		T
No. 2 San Diego State		–		9	–	0	–	1
No. 3 Chattanooga		–		9	–	1	–	0
Indiana State		–		9	–	1	–	0
Indiana (PA)		–		9	–	1	–	0
Nevada Southern		–		8	–	1	–	0
Ashland		–		8	–	2	–	0
No. 7 Eastern Michigan		–		8	–	2	–	0
Lincoln (MO)		–		8	–	2	–	0
St. Norbert		–		6	–	2	–	1
Tennessee State		–		6	–	2	–	1
UC Riverside		–		6	–	2	–	1
Hawaii		–		7	–	3	–	0
No. 14 Tampa		–		7	–	3	–	0
No. 17 Akron		–		7	–	3	–	1
Northeastern		–		6	–	3	–	0
Southern Illinois		–		6	–	3	–	0
Cortland		–		5	–	3	–	0
Boston University		–		5	–	3	–	1
Northern Arizona		–		6	–	4	–	0
Pacific (CA)		–		6	–	4	–	0
Samford		–		6	–	4	–	0
Northern Michigan		–		5	–	4	–	0
Parsons		–		5	–	4	–	0
Wheaton (IL)		–		5	–	4	–	0
Drake		–		5	–	5	–	0
UC Santa Barbara		–		4	–	4	–	1
Santa Clara		–		4	–	5	–	0
Portland State		–		4	–	6	–	0
Illinois College		–		2	–	4	–	2
Wayne State (MI)		–		3	–	6	–	0
Wabash		–		3	–	6	–	0
Colorado College		–		2	–	6	–	0
Kentucky State		–		2	–	7	–	0
Milwaukee		–		2	–	7	–	0
Lake Forest		–		2	–	8	–	0
Northern Illinois		–		2	–	8	–	0
Mississippi Valley State		–		1	–	7	–	0
UC San Diego		–		0	–	7	–	0
Rose Poly		–		0	–	8	–	0
Cal Poly Pomona		–		0	–	10	–	0
Rankings from AP small college poll

The 1968 UC San Diego Tritons football team was an American football team that represented the University of California, San Diego as an independent during the 1968 NCAA College Division football season. In their only year under head coach Walt Hackett, the team compiled an 0–7 record. This represented the lone season of Tritons football as the program was officially discontinued prior to the 1969 season.

Their 34–31 loss against the California Institute of Technology at Pasadena, ended a 34-game losing streak for the Engineers that stretched back to their 1964 season.

== Schedule ==
Date	Opponent	Site	Result	Attendance	Source
September 28	La Verne	San Diego, CA	L 6–41		
October 5	at Cal Lutheran	Thousand Oaks, CA	L 8–56		
October 12	at Loyola (CA)	Westchester H.S. Stadium; Los Angeles, CA	L 14–34	2,032	
November 2	Cal Western	San Diego, CA	L 7–34	2,461	
November 9	at Caltech	Tournament Park; Pasadena, CA	L 31–34		
November 16	at Nevada Southern	Cashman Field; Las Vegas, NV	L 6–27	600–2,000	
November 23	vs. Saint Mary's	Miramonte H.S. Stadium; Orinda, CA	L 13–27		
