= 1968 Boston University Terriers football team =

American college football season

1968 Boston University Terriers football
- Conference: Independent
- Record: 5–3–1
- Head coach: Warren Schmakel (5th season)
- Home stadium: Nickerson Field

1968 NCAA College Division independents football records
	Conf.			Overall
Team	W	L	T	W		L		T
No. 2 San Diego State		–		9	–	0	–	1
No. 3 Chattanooga		–		9	–	1	–	0
Indiana State		–		9	–	1	–	0
Indiana (PA)		–		9	–	1	–	0
Nevada Southern		–		8	–	1	–	0
Ashland		–		8	–	2	–	0
No. 7 Eastern Michigan		–		8	–	2	–	0
Lincoln (MO)		–		8	–	2	–	0
St. Norbert		–		6	–	2	–	1
Tennessee State		–		6	–	2	–	1
UC Riverside		–		6	–	2	–	1
Hawaii		–		7	–	3	–	0
No. 14 Tampa		–		7	–	3	–	0
No. 17 Akron		–		7	–	3	–	1
Northeastern		–		6	–	3	–	0
Southern Illinois		–		6	–	3	–	0
Cortland		–		5	–	3	–	0
Boston University		–		5	–	3	–	1
Northern Arizona		–		6	–	4	–	0
Pacific (CA)		–		6	–	4	–	0
Samford		–		6	–	4	–	0
Northern Michigan		–		5	–	4	–	0
Parsons		–		5	–	4	–	0
Wheaton (IL)		–		5	–	4	–	0
Drake		–		5	–	5	–	0
UC Santa Barbara		–		4	–	4	–	1
Santa Clara		–		4	–	5	–	0
Portland State		–		4	–	6	–	0
Illinois College		–		2	–	4	–	2
Wayne State (MI)		–		3	–	6	–	0
Wabash		–		3	–	6	–	0
Colorado College		–		2	–	6	–	0
Kentucky State		–		2	–	7	–	0
Milwaukee		–		2	–	7	–	0
Lake Forest		–		2	–	8	–	0
Northern Illinois		–		2	–	8	–	0
Mississippi Valley State		–		1	–	7	–	0
UC San Diego		–		0	–	7	–	0
Rose Poly		–		0	–	8	–	0
Cal Poly Pomona		–		0	–	10	–	0
Rankings from AP small college poll

The 1968 Boston University Terriers football team was an American football team that represented Boston University as an independent during the 1968 NCAA College Division football season. In its fifth and final season under head coach Warren Schmakel, the team compiled a 5–3–1 record and was outscored by a total of 125 to 117.

== Schedule ==
Date	Opponent	Site	Result	Attendance	Source
September 21	Colgate	Nickerson Field; Boston, MA	L 0–28	9,000	
September 28	at Maine	Alumni Field; Orono, ME	W 6–3	6,000	
October 5	Temple	Nickerson Field; Boston, MA	W 7–0	4,000	
October 12	at UMass	Alumni Stadium; Amherst, MA	W 21–7	13,000–13,200	
October 19	Holy Cross	Nickerson Field; Boston, MA	T 7–7	8,000	
November 2	at Connecticut	Memorial Stadium; Storrs, CT (Band Day)	W 33–23	12,053	
November 9	at Rhode Island	Meade Stadium; Kingston, RI	W 20–3	4,000–4,500	
November 16	at Delaware	Delaware Stadium; Newark, DE	L 13–41	10,350	
November 23	Buffalo	Nickerson Field; Boston, MA	L 10–13	8,000	
