= 1968 Pacific Tigers football team =

American college football season

1968 Pacific Tigers football
- Conference: Independent
- Record: 6–4
- Head coach: Doug Scovil (3rd season)
- Home stadium: Pacific Memorial Stadium

1968 NCAA College Division independents football records
	Conf.			Overall
Team	W	L	T	W		L		T
No. 2 San Diego State		–		9	–	0	–	1
No. 3 Chattanooga		–		9	–	1	–	0
Indiana State		–		9	–	1	–	0
Indiana (PA)		–		9	–	1	–	0
Nevada Southern		–		8	–	1	–	0
Ashland		–		8	–	2	–	0
No. 7 Eastern Michigan		–		8	–	2	–	0
Lincoln (MO)		–		8	–	2	–	0
St. Norbert		–		6	–	2	–	1
Tennessee State		–		6	–	2	–	1
UC Riverside		–		6	–	2	–	1
Hawaii		–		7	–	3	–	0
No. 14 Tampa		–		7	–	3	–	0
No. 17 Akron		–		7	–	3	–	1
Northeastern		–		6	–	3	–	0
Southern Illinois		–		6	–	3	–	0
Cortland		–		5	–	3	–	0
Boston University		–		5	–	3	–	1
Northern Arizona		–		6	–	4	–	0
Pacific (CA)		–		6	–	4	–	0
Samford		–		6	–	4	–	0
Northern Michigan		–		5	–	4	–	0
Parsons		–		5	–	4	–	0
Wheaton (IL)		–		5	–	4	–	0
Drake		–		5	–	5	–	0
UC Santa Barbara		–		4	–	4	–	1
Santa Clara		–		4	–	5	–	0
Portland State		–		4	–	6	–	0
Illinois College		–		2	–	4	–	2
Wayne State (MI)		–		3	–	6	–	0
Wabash		–		3	–	6	–	0
Colorado College		–		2	–	6	–	0
Kentucky State		–		2	–	7	–	0
Milwaukee		–		2	–	7	–	0
Lake Forest		–		2	–	8	–	0
Northern Illinois		–		2	–	8	–	0
Mississippi Valley State		–		1	–	7	–	0
UC San Diego		–		0	–	7	–	0
Rose Poly		–		0	–	8	–	0
Cal Poly Pomona		–		0	–	10	–	0
Rankings from AP small college poll

The 1968 Pacific Tigers football team represented the University of the Pacific (UOP) as an independent during the 1968 NCAA College Division football season. Led by third-year head coach Doug Scovil, the Tigers compiled a record of 6–4 and outscored opponents 179 to 158. This was the first winning season for Pacific since 1961. The team played home games at Pacific Memorial Stadium in Stockton, California.

== Schedule ==
Date	Opponent	Site	Result	Attendance	Source
September 21	Miami (OH)	Pacific Memorial Stadium; Stockton, CA	W 21–20	13,500	
September 28	at West Texas State	Buffalo Bowl; Canyon, TX	L 7–23	14,250	
October 5	vs. Idaho	old Bronco Stadium; Boise, ID	L 14–31	8,500	
October 12	Santa Clara	Pacific Memorial Stadium; Stockton, CA	W 30–22	7,800	
October 19	Utah State	Pacific Memorial Stadium; Stockton, CA	W 18–7	10,040	
October 26	at Colorado State	Hughes Stadium; Fort Collins, CO	W 31–0	12,003–14,200	
November 2	San Jose State	Pacific Memorial Stadium; Stockton, CA (Victory Bell)	W 28–0	3,400	
November 9	at UC Santa Barbara	Campus Stadium; Santa Barbara, CA	W 27–21	9,000	
November 16	Stanford	Pacific Memorial Stadium; Stockton, CA	L 0–24	20,500	
November 23	at Fresno State	Ratcliffe Stadium; Fresno, CA	L 3–10	7,752	

== NFL/AFL draft ==
Two Tigers were selected in the 1969 NFL/AFL draft.

Player	Position	Round	Overall	Franchise
Bob Heinz	Defensive lineman	2	37	Miami Dolphins
Rudy Redmond	Defensive back	4	91	Chicago Bears

The following finished their college career at Pacific, were not drafted, but played in the NFL starting with the 1969 season.

Player	Position	First NFL / AFL team
Bob Adams	Tight end – Tackle	1969 Pittsburgh Steelers
Bruce Coslet	Tight end	1969 Cincinnati Bengals
