= Barry Moore (American football) =

American football player (1948–2008)

- Barry Moore, 1970

Profile
- Positions: Wide receiver, defensive back

Personal information
- Born: November 26, 1947
- Died: August 31, 2008 (aged 60); Gilmer, Texas, U.S.
- Listed height: 5 ft 10 in (1.78 m)
- Listed weight: 175 lb (79 kg)

Career information
- High school: Gilmer (Gilmer, Texas)
- College: Cisco JC (1966–1967); North Texas (1968–1969)

Career history
- Houston Oilers (1970)*; Fort Worth Braves (1971)
- * Offseason or practice squad member only

Robert Barry Moore (1948 – August 31, 2008) was an American football wide receiver and defensive back.

== Career ==
After graduating in 1966 from Gilmer High School in Gilmer, Texas, he attended Cisco Junior College, playing football in 1966 and 1967 at end on offense and defensive halfback on defense. After his sophomore year, he transferred to North Texas State University in Denton, Texas; he played at split end for the North Texas Mean Green in 1968 and 1969. At North Texas, he ranked among the national receiving leaders with 69 receptions in 1968 (sixth), 71 receptions in 1969 (fourth), 1,053 receiving yards in 1968 (ninth), and 1,130 receiving yards in 1969 (fifth). He also set a North Texas single-game record against UTEP with 228 receiving yards.

Moore also played professional football. He played in the 1970 preseason with the Houston Oilers of the National Football League and during the 1970 regular season with the Fort Worth Braves of the Texas Football League. At Fort Worth, he played defensive back.

Moore later worked as a carpenter. In 2002, he was inducted into the North Texas Athletic Hall of Fame.

== Death ==
He died in 2008 in Gilmer, Texas, at age 59.

== See also ==
- North Texas Mean Green football statistical leaders
