= 1968 Tampa Spartans football team =

American college football season

1968 Tampa Spartans football
- Conference: Independent
- Record: 7–3
- Head coach: Fran Curci (1st season)
- Home stadium: Tampa Stadium

1968 NCAA College Division independents football records
	Conf.			Overall
Team	W	L	T	W		L		T
No. 2 San Diego State		–		9	–	0	–	1
No. 3 Chattanooga		–		9	–	1	–	0
Indiana State		–		9	–	1	–	0
Indiana (PA)		–		9	–	1	–	0
Nevada Southern		–		8	–	1	–	0
Ashland		–		8	–	2	–	0
No. 7 Eastern Michigan		–		8	–	2	–	0
Lincoln (MO)		–		8	–	2	–	0
St. Norbert		–		6	–	2	–	1
Tennessee State		–		6	–	2	–	1
UC Riverside		–		6	–	2	–	1
Hawaii		–		7	–	3	–	0
No. 14 Tampa		–		7	–	3	–	0
No. 17 Akron		–		7	–	3	–	1
Northeastern		–		6	–	3	–	0
Southern Illinois		–		6	–	3	–	0
Cortland		–		5	–	3	–	0
Boston University		–		5	–	3	–	1
Northern Arizona		–		6	–	4	–	0
Pacific (CA)		–		6	–	4	–	0
Samford		–		6	–	4	–	0
Northern Michigan		–		5	–	4	–	0
Parsons		–		5	–	4	–	0
Wheaton (IL)		–		5	–	4	–	0
Drake		–		5	–	5	–	0
UC Santa Barbara		–		4	–	4	–	1
Santa Clara		–		4	–	5	–	0
Portland State		–		4	–	6	–	0
Illinois College		–		2	–	4	–	2
Wayne State (MI)		–		3	–	6	–	0
Wabash		–		3	–	6	–	0
Colorado College		–		2	–	6	–	0
Kentucky State		–		2	–	7	–	0
Milwaukee		–		2	–	7	–	0
Lake Forest		–		2	–	8	–	0
Northern Illinois		–		2	–	8	–	0
Mississippi Valley State		–		1	–	7	–	0
UC San Diego		–		0	–	7	–	0
Rose Poly		–		0	–	8	–	0
Cal Poly Pomona		–		0	–	10	–	0
Rankings from AP small college poll

The 1968 Tampa Spartans football team represented the University of Tampa in the 1968 NCAA College Division football season. It was the Spartans' 32nd season. The team was led by head coach Fran Curci, in his first year, and played their home games at Tampa Stadium in Tampa, Florida. They finished with a record of seven wins and three losses (7–3). Curci was officially hired as the replacement for Sam Bailey as head coach on January 25, 1968, from the Miami Hurricanes, and he won his first game as head coach on the road against UC Santa Barbara. Other games of note during the season included upsets at Tulane and over Mississippi State, both of the NCAA University Division.

== Schedule ==
Date	Opponent	Site	Result	Attendance	Source
September 21	at UC Santa Barbara	Harder Stadium; Santa Barbara, CA	W 18–7	8,000	
September 28	Akron	Tampa Stadium; Tampa, FL	W 24–9	15,212	
October 5	at Tulane	Tulane Stadium; New Orleans, LA	W 17–14	17,000	
October 12	at Cincinnati	Nippert Stadium; Cincinnati, OH	L 28–31	11,307	
October 19	Eastern Michigan	Tampa Stadium; Tampa, FL	W 21–0	18,860	
October 26	Mississippi State	Tampa Stadium; Tampa, FL	W 24–17	23,340	
November 2	Northern Michigan	Tampa Stadium; Tampa, FL	W 22–19	24,620	
November 9	at East Carolina	Ficklen Memorial Stadium; Greenville, NC	W 28–21	15,000	
November 16	Southern Illinois	Tampa Stadium; Tampa, FL	L 20–23	23,280	
November 23	Southern Miss	Tampa Stadium; Tampa, FL	L 7–21	20,890	
