= 1968 Hawaii Rainbows football team =

American college football season

1968 Hawaii Rainbows football
- Conference: Independent
- Record: 7–3
- Head coach: Dave Holmes (1st season)
- Home stadium: Honolulu Stadium

1968 NCAA College Division independents football records
	Conf.			Overall
Team	W	L	T	W		L		T
No. 2 San Diego State		–		9	–	0	–	1
No. 3 Chattanooga		–		9	–	1	–	0
Indiana State		–		9	–	1	–	0
Indiana (PA)		–		9	–	1	–	0
Nevada Southern		–		8	–	1	–	0
Ashland		–		8	–	2	–	0
No. 7 Eastern Michigan		–		8	–	2	–	0
Lincoln (MO)		–		8	–	2	–	0
St. Norbert		–		6	–	2	–	1
Tennessee State		–		6	–	2	–	1
UC Riverside		–		6	–	2	–	1
Hawaii		–		7	–	3	–	0
No. 14 Tampa		–		7	–	3	–	0
No. 17 Akron		–		7	–	3	–	1
Northeastern		–		6	–	3	–	0
Southern Illinois		–		6	–	3	–	0
Cortland		–		5	–	3	–	0
Boston University		–		5	–	3	–	1
Northern Arizona		–		6	–	4	–	0
Pacific (CA)		–		6	–	4	–	0
Samford		–		6	–	4	–	0
Northern Michigan		–		5	–	4	–	0
Parsons		–		5	–	4	–	0
Wheaton (IL)		–		5	–	4	–	0
Drake		–		5	–	5	–	0
UC Santa Barbara		–		4	–	4	–	1
Santa Clara		–		4	–	5	–	0
Portland State		–		4	–	6	–	0
Wayne State (MI)		–		3	–	6	–	0
Wabash		–		3	–	6	–	0
Colorado College		–		2	–	6	–	0
Kentucky State		–		2	–	7	–	0
Milwaukee		–		2	–	7	–	0
Lake Forest		–		2	–	8	–	0
Northern Illinois		–		2	–	8	–	0
Mississippi Valley State		–		1	–	7	–	0
UC San Diego		–		0	–	7	–	0
Rose Poly		–		0	–	8	–	0
Cal Poly Pomona		–		0	–	10	–	0
Rankings from AP small college poll

The 1968 Hawaii Rainbows football team represented the University of Hawaiʻi at Mānoa as an independent during the 1968 NCAA College Division football season. In their first season under head coach Dave Holmes, the Rainbows compiled a 7–3 record.

== Schedule ==
Date	Opponent	Site	Result	Attendance	Source
September 21	Humboldt State	Honolulu Stadium; Honolulu, HI	W 34–20	15,478	
September 28	Puget Sound	Honolulu Stadium; Honolulu, HI	W 38–28	15,440	
October 5	UBC	Honolulu Stadium; Honolulu, HI	W 48–0	12,533–15,891	
October 12	at UC Santa Barbara	Campus Stadium; Santa Barbara, CA	L 14–49	8,500	
October 19	Santa Clara	Honolulu Stadium; Honolulu, HI	W 23–12	19,852–21,867	
November 2	at Cal State Los Angeles	Rose Bowl; Pasadena, CA	L 33–46	2,914	
November 9	Whitworth	Honolulu Stadium; Honolulu, HI	W 54–14	8,721	
November 16	Linfield	Honolulu Stadium; Honolulu, HI	W 35–13	12,950	
November 23	Nevada^{†}	Honolulu Stadium; Honolulu, HI	W 21–0	14,005	
November 30	California	Honolulu Stadium; Honolulu, HI	L 12–17	19,042	
^{†}Homecoming
