= 1968 UC Santa Barbara Gauchos football team =

American college football season

1968 UC Santa Barbara Gauchos football
- Conference: Independent
- Record: 4–4–1
- Head coach: Jack Curtice (6th season)
- Home stadium: Campus Stadium

1968 NCAA College Division independents football records
	Conf.			Overall
Team	W	L	T	W		L		T
No. 2 San Diego State		–		9	–	0	–	1
No. 3 Chattanooga		–		9	–	1	–	0
Indiana State		–		9	–	1	–	0
Indiana (PA)		–		9	–	1	–	0
Nevada Southern		–		8	–	1	–	0
Ashland		–		8	–	2	–	0
No. 7 Eastern Michigan		–		8	–	2	–	0
Lincoln (MO)		–		8	–	2	–	0
St. Norbert		–		6	–	2	–	1
Tennessee State		–		6	–	2	–	1
UC Riverside		–		6	–	2	–	1
Hawaii		–		7	–	3	–	0
No. 14 Tampa		–		7	–	3	–	0
No. 17 Akron		–		7	–	3	–	1
Northeastern		–		6	–	3	–	0
Southern Illinois		–		6	–	3	–	0
Cortland		–		5	–	3	–	0
Boston University		–		5	–	3	–	1
Northern Arizona		–		6	–	4	–	0
Pacific (CA)		–		6	–	4	–	0
Samford		–		6	–	4	–	0
Northern Michigan		–		5	–	4	–	0
Parsons		–		5	–	4	–	0
Wheaton (IL)		–		5	–	4	–	0
Drake		–		5	–	5	–	0
UC Santa Barbara		–		4	–	4	–	1
Santa Clara		–		4	–	5	–	0
Portland State		–		4	–	6	–	0
Wayne State (MI)		–		3	–	6	–	0
Wabash		–		3	–	6	–	0
Colorado College		–		2	–	6	–	0
Kentucky State		–		2	–	7	–	0
Milwaukee		–		2	–	7	–	0
Lake Forest		–		2	–	8	–	0
Northern Illinois		–		2	–	8	–	0
Mississippi Valley State		–		1	–	7	–	0
UC San Diego		–		0	–	7	–	0
Rose Poly		–		0	–	8	–	0
Cal Poly Pomona		–		0	–	10	–	0
Rankings from AP small college poll

The 1968 UC Santa Barbara Gauchos football team represented the University of California, Santa Barbara (UCSB) as an independent during the 1968 NCAA College Division football season. Led by sixth-year head coach Jack Curtice, the Gauchos compiled a record of 4–4–1 and outscored their opponents 253 to 163. The team played home games at Campus Stadium in Santa Barbara, California.

This was the last season win which UC Santa Barbara competed at the NCAA College Division. The Gauchos moved up to the NCAA University Division in 1969 as a charter member of the Pacific Coast Athletic Association (PCAA).

== Schedule ==
Date	Opponent	Site	Result	Attendance	Source
September 14	at UTEP	Sun Bowl; El Paso, TX	T 14–14	26,820	
September 21	Tampa	Campus Stadium; Santa Barbara, CA	L 7–18	8,000	
September 28	at Nevada	Mackay Stadium; Reno, NV	L 13–17	3,000–5,000	
October 5	Whittier	Campus Stadium; Santa Barbara, CA	W 58–14	8,000	
October 12	Hawaii	Campus Stadium; Santa Barbara, CA	W 49–14	8,500	
October 19	at Long Beach State	Veterans Memorial Stadium; Long Beach, CA	W 42–21	5,000	
November 2	at Santa Clara	Buck Shaw Stadium; Santa Clara, CA	W 35–14	4,222	
November 9	Pacific (CA)	Campus Stadium; Santa Barbara, CA	L 21–27	9,000	
November 16	Cal Poly	Campus Stadium; Santa Barbara, CA	L 14–24	10,000	

== Team players in the NFL ==
The following Santa Barbara Gaucho players were selected in the 1969 NFL/AFL draft.

Player	Position	Round	Overall	NFL team
David Chapple	Punter	10	250	San Francisco 49ers
Tom Broadhead	Running back	12	293	New Orleans Saints
Dick Heinz	Defensive tackle	13	331	St. Louis Cardinals
