= 1968 Nevada Southern Rebels football team =

American college football season

1968 Nevada Southern Rebels football
- Conference: Independent
- Record: 8–1
- Head coach: Bill Ireland (1st season)
- Home stadium: Cashman Field

1968 NCAA College Division independents football records
| | Conf. | | | Overall |
| Team | W | L | T | W | | L | | T |
|---|---|---|---|---|---|---|---|---|
| No. 2 San Diego State | | – | | 9 | – | 0 | – | 1 |
| No. 3 Chattanooga | | – | | 9 | – | 1 | – | 0 |
| Indiana State | | – | | 9 | – | 1 | – | 0 |
| Indiana (PA) | | – | | 9 | – | 1 | – | 0 |
| Nevada Southern | | – | | 8 | – | 1 | – | 0 |
| Ashland | | – | | 8 | – | 2 | – | 0 |
| No. 7 Eastern Michigan | | – | | 8 | – | 2 | – | 0 |
| Lincoln (MO) | | – | | 8 | – | 2 | – | 0 |
| St. Norbert | | – | | 6 | – | 2 | – | 1 |
| Tennessee State | | – | | 6 | – | 2 | – | 1 |
| UC Riverside | | – | | 6 | – | 2 | – | 1 |
| Hawaii | | – | | 7 | – | 3 | – | 0 |
| No. 14 Tampa | | – | | 7 | – | 3 | – | 0 |
| No. 17 Akron | | – | | 7 | – | 3 | – | 1 |
| Northeastern | | – | | 6 | – | 3 | – | 0 |
| Southern Illinois | | – | | 6 | – | 3 | – | 0 |
| Cortland | | – | | 5 | – | 3 | – | 0 |
| Boston University | | – | | 5 | – | 3 | – | 1 |
| Northern Arizona | | – | | 6 | – | 4 | – | 0 |
| Pacific (CA) | | – | | 6 | – | 4 | – | 0 |
| Samford | | – | | 6 | – | 4 | – | 0 |
| Northern Michigan | | – | | 5 | – | 4 | – | 0 |
| Parsons | | – | | 5 | – | 4 | – | 0 |
| Wheaton (IL) | | – | | 5 | – | 4 | – | 0 |
| Drake | | – | | 5 | – | 5 | – | 0 |
| UC Santa Barbara | | – | | 4 | – | 4 | – | 1 |
| Santa Clara | | – | | 4 | – | 5 | – | 0 |
| Portland State | | – | | 4 | – | 6 | – | 0 |
| Wayne State (MI) | | – | | 3 | – | 6 | – | 0 |
| Wabash | | – | | 3 | – | 6 | – | 0 |
| Colorado College | | – | | 2 | – | 6 | – | 0 |
| Kentucky State | | – | | 2 | – | 7 | – | 0 |
| Milwaukee | | – | | 2 | – | 7 | – | 0 |
| Lake Forest | | – | | 2 | – | 8 | – | 0 |
| Northern Illinois | | – | | 2 | – | 8 | – | 0 |
| Mississippi Valley State | | – | | 1 | – | 7 | – | 0 |
| UC San Diego | | – | | 0 | – | 7 | – | 0 |
| Rose Poly | | – | | 0 | – | 8 | – | 0 |
| Cal Poly Pomona | | – | | 0 | – | 10 | – | 0 |
Rankings from AP small college poll

The 1968 Nevada Southern Rebels football team was an American football team that represented Nevada Southern University (now University of Nevada, Las Vegas) as an independent during the 1968 NCAA College Division football season. In the football program's first year, the Rebels were led by head coach Bill Ireland, played their home games at Cashman Field, and compiled an 8–1 record.

== Schedule ==
| Date | Time | Opponent | Site | Result | Attendance | Source |
|---|---|---|---|---|---|---|
| September 14 | 8:00 pm | Saint Mary's | Cashman Field; Las Vegas, NV | W 27–20 | 8,500 | |
| September 21 | 2:00 pm | at Azusa Pacific | Cougar Athletic Stadium; Azusa, CA | W 29–8 | 300 | |
| September 28 | 8:00 pm | at San Francisco | Kezar Stadium; San Francisco, CA | W 23–7 | 2,500 | |
| October 5 | 8:00 pm | Westminster (UT) | Cashman Field; Las Vegas, NV | W 27–7 | 6,800 | |
| October 19 | 8:00 pm | Southern Colorado | Cashman Field; Las Vegas, NV | W 25–21 | 7,000 | |
| October 26 | 8:00 pm | Caltech | Cashman Field; Las Vegas, NV | W 69–0 | 6,500 | |
| November 2 | 1:30 pm | Southern Utah | Cashman Field; Las Vegas, NV | W 26–17 | 7,000 | |
| November 16 | 1:30 pm | UC San Diego | Cashman Field; Las Vegas, NV | W 27–6 | 600–2,000 | |
| November 23 | 1:30 pm | Cal Lutheran | Cashman Field; Las Vegas, NV | L 13–17 | 8,000 | |
All times are in Pacific time
