= 1968 UC Riverside Highlanders football team =

American college football season

1968 UC Riverside Highlanders football
- Conference: Independent
- Record: 6–2–1
- Head coach: Pete Kettela (4th season)
- Home stadium: Highlander Stadium

1968 NCAA College Division independents football records
	Conf.			Overall
Team	W	L	T	W		L		T
No. 2 San Diego State		–		9	–	0	–	1
No. 3 Chattanooga		–		9	–	1	–	0
Indiana State		–		9	–	1	–	0
Indiana (PA)		–		9	–	1	–	0
Nevada Southern		–		8	–	1	–	0
Ashland		–		8	–	2	–	0
No. 7 Eastern Michigan		–		8	–	2	–	0
Lincoln (MO)		–		8	–	2	–	0
St. Norbert		–		6	–	2	–	1
Tennessee State		–		6	–	2	–	1
UC Riverside		–		6	–	2	–	1
Hawaii		–		7	–	3	–	0
No. 14 Tampa		–		7	–	3	–	0
No. 17 Akron		–		7	–	3	–	1
Northeastern		–		6	–	3	–	0
Southern Illinois		–		6	–	3	–	0
Cortland		–		5	–	3	–	0
Boston University		–		5	–	3	–	1
Northern Arizona		–		6	–	4	–	0
Pacific (CA)		–		6	–	4	–	0
Samford		–		6	–	4	–	0
Northern Michigan		–		5	–	4	–	0
Parsons		–		5	–	4	–	0
Wheaton (IL)		–		5	–	4	–	0
Drake		–		5	–	5	–	0
UC Santa Barbara		–		4	–	4	–	1
Santa Clara		–		4	–	5	–	0
Portland State		–		4	–	6	–	0
Wayne State (MI)		–		3	–	6	–	0
Wabash		–		3	–	6	–	0
Colorado College		–		2	–	6	–	0
Kentucky State		–		2	–	7	–	0
Milwaukee		–		2	–	7	–	0
Lake Forest		–		2	–	8	–	0
Northern Illinois		–		2	–	8	–	0
Mississippi Valley State		–		1	–	7	–	0
UC San Diego		–		0	–	7	–	0
Rose Poly		–		0	–	8	–	0
Cal Poly Pomona		–		0	–	10	–	0
Rankings from AP small college poll

The 1968 UC Riverside Highlanders football team represented the University of California, Riverside as an independent during the 1968 NCAA College Division football season. Led by fourth-year head coach Pete Kettela, UC Riverside compiled a record of 6–2–1. The Highlanders played home games at Highlander Stadium in Riverside, California.

This was the last year that Highlanders competed as an independent as they joined the California Collegiate Athletic Association (CCAA) in 1969.

== Schedule ==
Date	Time	Opponent	Site	Result	Attendance	Source
September 28	8:00 p.m.	at Loyola (CA)	Westchester High School; Angeles, CA	W 27–13	3,019–3,100	
October 5		at La Verne	Arnett Field; La Verne, CA	L 19–24	3,000	
October 12		Saint Mary's	Highlander Stadium; Riverside, CA	W 40–28	3,500	
October 19		at Redlands	Redlands Stadium; Redlands, CA	W 35–29	3,500	
October 26		Claremont-Mudd	Highlander Stadium; Riverside, CA	W 49–30	3,500	
November 2		Pomona	Highlander Stadium; Riverside, CA	T 21–21	3,500–4,000	
November 9		San Francisco	Highlander Stadium; Riverside, CA	W 49–26	4,100–4,200	
November 16		Azusa Pacific	Highlander Stadium; Riverside, CA	W 56–6	2,500	
November 23		Cal State Hayward	Highlander Stadium; Riverside, CA	L 14–40	3,500	
All times are in Pacific time
