= 1968 Cal Poly Pomona Broncos football team =

American college football season

1968 Cal Poly Pomona Broncos football
- Conference: Independent
- Record: 0–10
- Head coach: Ray Daugherty (2nd season)
- Home stadium: Kellogg Field

1968 NCAA College Division independents football records
	Conf.			Overall
Team	W	L	T	W		L		T
No. 2 San Diego State		–		9	–	0	–	1
No. 3 Chattanooga		–		9	–	1	–	0
Indiana State		–		9	–	1	–	0
Indiana (PA)		–		9	–	1	–	0
Nevada Southern		–		8	–	1	–	0
Ashland		–		8	–	2	–	0
No. 7 Eastern Michigan		–		8	–	2	–	0
Lincoln (MO)		–		8	–	2	–	0
St. Norbert		–		6	–	2	–	1
Tennessee State		–		6	–	2	–	1
UC Riverside		–		6	–	2	–	1
Hawaii		–		7	–	3	–	0
No. 14 Tampa		–		7	–	3	–	0
No. 17 Akron		–		7	–	3	–	1
Northeastern		–		6	–	3	–	0
Southern Illinois		–		6	–	3	–	0
Cortland		–		5	–	3	–	0
Boston University		–		5	–	3	–	1
Northern Arizona		–		6	–	4	–	0
Pacific (CA)		–		6	–	4	–	0
Samford		–		6	–	4	–	0
Northern Michigan		–		5	–	4	–	0
Parsons		–		5	–	4	–	0
Wheaton (IL)		–		5	–	4	–	0
Drake		–		5	–	5	–	0
UC Santa Barbara		–		4	–	4	–	1
Santa Clara		–		4	–	5	–	0
Portland State		–		4	–	6	–	0
Wayne State (MI)		–		3	–	6	–	0
Wabash		–		3	–	6	–	0
Colorado College		–		2	–	6	–	0
Kentucky State		–		2	–	7	–	0
Milwaukee		–		2	–	7	–	0
Lake Forest		–		2	–	8	–	0
Northern Illinois		–		2	–	8	–	0
Mississippi Valley State		–		1	–	7	–	0
UC San Diego		–		0	–	7	–	0
Rose Poly		–		0	–	8	–	0
Cal Poly Pomona		–		0	–	10	–	0
Rankings from AP small college poll

The 1968 Cal Poly Pomona Broncos football team represented California State Polytechnic College, Kellogg-Voorhis—now known as California State Polytechnic University, Pomona—as an independent during the 1968 NCAA College Division football season. Led by Ray Daugherty in his second and final season, Cal Poly Pomona compiled a record of 0–10. The team was outscored by its opponents 376 to 158 for the season. The Broncos played home games at Kellogg Field in Pomona, California.

Cal Poly Pomona joined the California Collegiate Athletic Association (CCAA) in 1967, but the football team's games in 1967 and 1968 did not count as conference play since they did not play a full conference schedule.

== Schedule ==
Date	Time	Opponent	Site	Result	Attendance	Source
September 21		at Cal State Hayward	Pioneer Stadium; Hayward, CA	L 23–61	2,900–3,000	
September 28	2:00 p.m.	at Sacramento State	Hornet Field; Sacramento, CA	L 13–26	4,500	
October 5		at Santa Clara	Buck Shaw Stadium; Santa Clara, CA	L 13–34	6,275	
October 12		Cal State Los Angeles	Rose Bowl; Pasadena, CA	L 28–63	2,171–2,200	
October 19		at Chico State	University Stadium; Chico, CA	L 13–24	4,000–4,500	
October 26		UC Davis	Kellogg Field; Pomona, CA	L 15–17	1,500–2,500	
November 2		at Whittier	Memorial Stadium; Whittier, CA	L 7–42	1,500	
November 9		Valley State	Kellogg Field; Pomona, CA	L 17–31	2,000–2,500	
November 23		Humboldt State	Kellogg Field; Pomona, CA	L 9–40	1,500–3,500	
November 28		Cal Poly	Kellogg Field; Pomona, CA	L 20–38	1,500–2,000	
All times are in Pacific time
