= 1968 Chattanooga Moccasins football team =

American college football season

1968 Chattanooga Moccasins football
- Conference: Independent

Ranking
- AP: No. 3
- Record: 9–1
- Head coach: Harold Wilkes (1st season)
- Home stadium: Chamberlain Field

1968 NCAA College Division independents football records
	Conf.			Overall
Team	W	L	T	W		L		T
No. 2 San Diego State		–		9	–	0	–	1
No. 3 Chattanooga		–		9	–	1	–	0
Indiana State		–		9	–	1	–	0
Indiana (PA)		–		9	–	1	–	0
Nevada Southern		–		8	–	1	–	0
Ashland		–		8	–	2	–	0
No. 7 Eastern Michigan		–		8	–	2	–	0
Lincoln (MO)		–		8	–	2	–	0
St. Norbert		–		6	–	2	–	1
Tennessee State		–		6	–	2	–	1
UC Riverside		–		6	–	2	–	1
Hawaii		–		7	–	3	–	0
No. 14 Tampa		–		7	–	3	–	0
No. 17 Akron		–		7	–	3	–	1
Northeastern		–		6	–	3	–	0
Southern Illinois		–		6	–	3	–	0
Cortland		–		5	–	3	–	0
Boston University		–		5	–	3	–	1
Northern Arizona		–		6	–	4	–	0
Pacific (CA)		–		6	–	4	–	0
Samford		–		6	–	4	–	0
Northern Michigan		–		5	–	4	–	0
Parsons		–		5	–	4	–	0
Wheaton (IL)		–		5	–	4	–	0
Drake		–		5	–	5	–	0
UC Santa Barbara		–		4	–	4	–	1
Santa Clara		–		4	–	5	–	0
Portland State		–		4	–	6	–	0
Illinois College		–		2	–	4	–	2
Wayne State (MI)		–		3	–	6	–	0
Wabash		–		3	–	6	–	0
Colorado College		–		2	–	6	–	0
Kentucky State		–		2	–	7	–	0
Milwaukee		–		2	–	7	–	0
Lake Forest		–		2	–	8	–	0
Northern Illinois		–		2	–	8	–	0
Mississippi Valley State		–		1	–	7	–	0
UC San Diego		–		0	–	7	–	0
Rose Poly		–		0	–	8	–	0
Cal Poly Pomona		–		0	–	10	–	0
Rankings from AP small college poll

The 1968 Chattanooga Moccasins football team was an American football team that represented the University of Chattanooga (now known as the University of Tennessee at Chattanooga) during the 1968 NCAA College Division football season. In their first year under head coach Harold Wilkes, the team compiled a 9–1 record.

== Schedule ==
Date	Opponent	Rank	Site	Result	Attendance	Source
September 21	at Austin Peay		Municipal Stadium; Clarksville, TN	W 41–13	5,200	
September 28	at Jacksonville State		Paul Snow Stadium; Jacksonville, AL	W 32–14	8,500	
October 5	Middle Tennessee		Chamberlain Field; Chattanooga, TN	W 28–15	11,500	
October 12	at Wofford	No. 17	Snyder Field; Spartanburg, SC	W 35–14	6,000	
October 19	East Tennessee State	No. 9	Chamberlain Field; Chattanooga, TN	W 16–6	8,000	
October 26	The Citadel^{†}	No. 5	Chamberlain Field; Chattanooga, TN	W 31–9	11,500	
November 2	at Tennessee Tech	No. 3	Overall Field; Cookeville, TN	W 20–6	5,500	
November 9	at Ole Miss	No. 3	Hemingway Stadium; Oxford, MS	L 16–38	15,000	
November 16	Furman	No. 5	Chamberlain Field; Chattanooga, TN	W 31–14	8,000	
November 23	Samford	No. 4	Chamberlain Field; Chattanooga, TN	W 40–7	5,000–7,500	
^{†}Homecoming; Rankings from AP Poll released prior to the game
