= 1968 New Mexico Highlands Cowboys football team =

American college football season

1968 New Mexico Highlands Cowboys football
- Conference: Independent
- Record: 9–0
- Head coach: John Levra (2nd season)

1968 NAIA independents football records
	Conf.			Overall
Team	W	L	T	W		L		T
No. 7 Doane		–		10	–	0	–	0
New Mexico Highlands		–		9	–	0	–	0
No. 15 Ferris State		–		7	–	0	–	1
No. 9 Cal Lutheran		–		9	–	1	–	0
No. 10 Emory and Henry		–		9	–	1	–	0
Indiana (PA)		–		9	–	1	–	0
No. 16 Austin		–		8	–	1	–	0
No. 11 Appalachian State		–		8	–	2	–	0
Boise State		–		8	–	2	–	0
No. 20 Carson–Newman		–		8	–	2	–	0
La Verne		–		7	–	2	–	0
Hillsdale		–		6	–	3	–	0
St. Mary of the Plains		–		6	–	4	–	0
Oklahoma Panhandle State		–		5	–	5	–	1
Eastern New Mexico		–		4	–	5	–	1
Simon Fraser		–		4	–	5	–	0
Southern Colorado State		–		4	–	6	–	0
Southwest State (MN)		–		3	–	5	–	0
Wofford		–		4	–	7	–	0
Westminster (UT)		–		3	–	6	–	0
Georgetown (KY)		–		2	–	6	–	0
Azusa Pacific		–		2	–	7	–	0
Kentucky State		–		2	–	7	–	0
Missouri Southern		–		2	–	8	–	0
Iowa Wesleyan		–		1	–	7	–	1
Rankings from NAIA poll

The 1968 New Mexico Highlands Cowboys football team was an American football team that represented New Mexico Highlands University as an independent during the 1968 NAIA football season. In their second year under head coach John Levra, the Cowboys compiled a perfect 9–0 record and outscored opponents by a total of 533 to 53.

The Cowboys set new school records with 533 points scored and 4,685 yards of total offense. They gained an average of 520.6 yards of total offense per game, consisting of 331.0 rushing yards and 189.6 passing yards. On defense, the Cowboys held opponents to an average of 191.2 yards per game, 84.2 yards rushing and 107.0 yards passing.

Halfback Carl Garrett was selected as a first-team player on the 1968 Little All-America college football team. He tallied 1,373 rushing yards (8.3 yards per carry, 171.6 yards per game) in 1968 and scored 132 points. He received Little All-American honors each year from 1966 to 1968 and totaled 3,364 rushing yards. Other key players included quarterback Grady Herold (broke school records with 22 touchdown passes and .642 completion percentage), fullback Benny Cortez (646 yards, 4.1 yards per carry), and George Taplin (broke school record with nine touchdown receptions and 540 receiving yards).

At the end of the season, the NAIA placed New Mexico Highlands on probation until June 30, 1969. The NAIA took the action as a result of Highlands' cancelling four basketball games without giving sufficient notice. As a result, the football team was disqualified from competing in the NAIA playoffs despite being ranked No. 1.

== Schedule ==
Date	Opponent	Site	Result	Source
September 14	Simon Fraser	Las Vegas, NM	W 34–9	
September 21	Southern Utah	Las Vegas, NM	W 85–0	
September 28	Hiram Scott	Las Vegas, NM	W 72–0	
October 5	at Adams State	Alamosa, CO	W 28–6	
October 12	at Westminster (UT)	Salt Lake City, UT	W 49–0	
October 19	Colorado Mines^{†}	Las Vegas, NM	W 85–14	
October 26	Western New Mexico	Las Vegas, NM	W 62–7	
November 2	at Western State (CO)	Gunnison, CO	W 70–7	
November 9	at Southern Colorado	Pueblo, CO	W 48–10	
^{†}Homecoming

== Personnel ==
The following 36 players received varsity letters for their participation on the 1968 New Mexico Highlands football team:

1. Carl Browning, sophomore, defensive end-center, Midland, TX
2. Permon Chavious, senior, tackle, Columbia, SC
3. Ben Cortez, senior, fullback, Kingsville, TX
4. Andrew Crawford, junior, defensive end, Corpus Christi, TX
5. Roy Culberson, junior, linebacker, El Paso, TX
6. Jim Elam, senior, defensive back, Kingsville, TX
7. McKinney Evans, sophomore, defensive back, Denton, TX
8. Jim Fortner, junior, defensive back, Lovington, NM
9. Carl Garrett, senior, halfback, Denton, TX
10. Leonard Garrett, sophomore, tight end, Silsbee, TX
11. Ron Gentry, senior, guard, Corpus Christi, TX
12. Tom Gillespie, senior, flanker, Centerline, MI
13. George Gomez, sophomore, defensive tackle, El Paso, TX
14. David Graham, junior, defensive tackle, Abilene, TX
15. Fred Hernandez, senior, center, Corpus Christi, TX
16. Grady Herold, senior, quarterback, Cercedes, TX
17. Larry Herold, junior, fullback, Mercedes, TX
18. John Keith, junior, linebacker-end, Rantoul, IL
19. Larry Kell, junior, split end, Corpus Christi, TX
20. Gary Killion, sophomore, linebacker, Weatherford, TX
21. Pat Lindelow, sophomore, tackle, Kansas City, KS
22. Harry Long, senior, guard, Richmond, KY
23. George Parr, freshman, safety, El Paso, TX
24. Steve Pruitt, sophomore, quarterback, Borger, TX
25. Buddy Roberts, junior, punter, Harlingen, TX
26. David Robledo, senior, defensive safety, Harlingen, TX
27. Greg Roero, junior, defensive tackle, Opa Locka, FL
28. Al Sheldon, junior, tackle, Corpus Christi, TX
29. John Smith, junior, linebacker, Santa Fe, NM
30. Ralph Szydlik, junior, halfback, Centerline, MI
31. George Taplin, sophomore, flanker, Fort Worth, TX
32. Al Tolentino, junior, safety, El Paso, TX
33. Hayden White, sophomore, center, Port Neches, TX
34. Floyd Worlow, freshman, tackle, Springtown, TX
35. Ron L. Young, sophomore, guard-linebacker, Lubbock, TX
36. Ron S. Young, senior, guard, Miami, FL
