= 1968 Akron Zips football team =

American college football season

1968 Akron Zips football

Grantland Rice Bowl, L 13–33 vs. Louisiana Tech
- Conference: Independent
- Record: 7–3–1
- Head coach: Gordon K. Larson (8th season)
- Captain: Don Zwisler; Nate Hagins
- Home stadium: Rubber Bowl

1968 NCAA College Division independents football records
| | Conf. | | | Overall |
| Team | W | L | T | W | | L | | T |
|---|---|---|---|---|---|---|---|---|
| No. 2 San Diego State | | – | | 9 | – | 0 | – | 1 |
| No. 3 Chattanooga | | – | | 9 | – | 1 | – | 0 |
| Indiana State | | – | | 9 | – | 1 | – | 0 |
| Indiana (PA) | | – | | 9 | – | 1 | – | 0 |
| Nevada Southern | | – | | 8 | – | 1 | – | 0 |
| Ashland | | – | | 8 | – | 2 | – | 0 |
| No. 7 Eastern Michigan | | – | | 8 | – | 2 | – | 0 |
| Lincoln (MO) | | – | | 8 | – | 2 | – | 0 |
| St. Norbert | | – | | 6 | – | 2 | – | 1 |
| Tennessee State | | – | | 6 | – | 2 | – | 1 |
| UC Riverside | | – | | 6 | – | 2 | – | 1 |
| Hawaii | | – | | 7 | – | 3 | – | 0 |
| No. 14 Tampa | | – | | 7 | – | 3 | – | 0 |
| No. 17 Akron | | – | | 7 | – | 3 | – | 1 |
| Northeastern | | – | | 6 | – | 3 | – | 0 |
| Southern Illinois | | – | | 6 | – | 3 | – | 0 |
| Cortland | | – | | 5 | – | 3 | – | 0 |
| Boston University | | – | | 5 | – | 3 | – | 1 |
| Northern Arizona | | – | | 6 | – | 4 | – | 0 |
| Pacific (CA) | | – | | 6 | – | 4 | – | 0 |
| Samford | | – | | 6 | – | 4 | – | 0 |
| Northern Michigan | | – | | 5 | – | 4 | – | 0 |
| Parsons | | – | | 5 | – | 4 | – | 0 |
| Wheaton (IL) | | – | | 5 | – | 4 | – | 0 |
| Drake | | – | | 5 | – | 5 | – | 0 |
| UC Santa Barbara | | – | | 4 | – | 4 | – | 1 |
| Santa Clara | | – | | 4 | – | 5 | – | 0 |
| Portland State | | – | | 4 | – | 6 | – | 0 |
| Illinois College | | – | | 2 | – | 4 | – | 2 |
| Wayne State (MI) | | – | | 3 | – | 6 | – | 0 |
| Wabash | | – | | 3 | – | 6 | – | 0 |
| Colorado College | | – | | 2 | – | 6 | – | 0 |
| Kentucky State | | – | | 2 | – | 7 | – | 0 |
| Milwaukee | | – | | 2 | – | 7 | – | 0 |
| Lake Forest | | – | | 2 | – | 8 | – | 0 |
| Northern Illinois | | – | | 2 | – | 8 | – | 0 |
| Mississippi Valley State | | – | | 1 | – | 7 | – | 0 |
| UC San Diego | | – | | 0 | – | 7 | – | 0 |
| Rose Poly | | – | | 0 | – | 8 | – | 0 |
| Cal Poly Pomona | | – | | 0 | – | 10 | – | 0 |
Rankings from AP small college poll

The 1968 Akron Zips football team represented Akron University in the 1968 NCAA College Division football season as an independent. Led by eighth-year head coach Gordon K. Larson, the Zips played their home games at the Rubber Bowl in Akron, Ohio. They finished the regular season with a record of 7–2–1, ranked No. 17 in the nation, and were invited to play in the Grantland Rice Bowl, functionally the Mideast regional championship game for the NCAA's College Division, against the Louisiana Tech Bulldogs.

After their postseason loss, the Zips finished the season 7–3–1, having outscored their opponents 327–172 in total.

== Schedule ==
| Date | Opponent | Rank | Site | Result | Attendance | Source |
|---|---|---|---|---|---|---|
| September 14 | at Butler | | Butler Bowl; Indianapolis, IN | W 32–7 | 3,800 | |
| September 21 | Indiana State | | Rubber Bowl; Akron, OH | W 41–13 | 43,068 | |
| September 28 | at Tampa | No. 5 | Tampa Stadium; Tampa, FL | L 9–24 | 15,212 | |
| October 5 | Eastern Michigan | No. T–17 | Rubber Bowl; Akron, OH | L 7–16 | 2,051 | |
| October 12 | at Bradley | | Peoria Stadium; Peoria, IL | W 27–13 | 3,000 | |
| October 19 | at No. 3 Eastern Kentucky | | Hanger Field; Richmond, KY | W 31–20 | 12,500 | |
| November 2 | Illinois State | No. 15 | Rubber Bowl; Akron, OH | W 46–0 | 3,500–3,559 | |
| November 9 | Baldwin–Wallace | No. 15 | Rubber Bowl; Akron, OH | W 59–19 | 4,763 | |
| November 16 | at No. 8 Western Kentucky | No. 15 | L. T. Smith Stadium; Bowling Green, KY | T 14–14 | 7,335–9,000 | |
| November 22 | at Youngstown State | No. 16 | Rayen Stadium; Youngstown, OH (Steel Tire) | W 48–13 | 5,000 | |
| December 14 | vs. Louisiana Tech | No. 17 | Horace Jones Field; Murfreesboro, TN (Grantland Rice Bowl) | L 13–33 | 2,500 | |
Rankings from AP Poll released prior to the game
