= 1968 San Diego State Aztecs football team =

American college football season

1968 San Diego State Aztecs football

UPI small college national champion
- Conference: Independent

Ranking
- Coaches: No. 1 (UPI small college)
- AP: No. 2 (AP small college)
- Record: 9–0–1
- Head coach: Don Coryell (8th season)
- Offensive coordinator: Rod Dowhower (1st season)
- Offensive scheme: Air Coryell
- Home stadium: San Diego Stadium

1968 NCAA College Division independents football records
	Conf.			Overall
Team	W	L	T	W		L		T
No. 2 San Diego State		–		9	–	0	–	1
No. 3 Chattanooga		–		9	–	1	–	0
Indiana State		–		9	–	1	–	0
Indiana (PA)		–		9	–	1	–	0
Nevada Southern		–		8	–	1	–	0
Ashland		–		8	–	2	–	0
No. 7 Eastern Michigan		–		8	–	2	–	0
Lincoln (MO)		–		8	–	2	–	0
St. Norbert		–		6	–	2	–	1
Tennessee State		–		6	–	2	–	1
UC Riverside		–		6	–	2	–	1
Hawaii		–		7	–	3	–	0
No. 14 Tampa		–		7	–	3	–	0
No. 17 Akron		–		7	–	3	–	1
Northeastern		–		6	–	3	–	0
Southern Illinois		–		6	–	3	–	0
Cortland		–		5	–	3	–	0
Boston University		–		5	–	3	–	1
Northern Arizona		–		6	–	4	–	0
Pacific (CA)		–		6	–	4	–	0
Samford		–		6	–	4	–	0
Northern Michigan		–		5	–	4	–	0
Parsons		–		5	–	4	–	0
Wheaton (IL)		–		5	–	4	–	0
Drake		–		5	–	5	–	0
UC Santa Barbara		–		4	–	4	–	1
Santa Clara		–		4	–	5	–	0
Portland State		–		4	–	6	–	0
Illinois College		–		2	–	4	–	2
Wayne State (MI)		–		3	–	6	–	0
Wabash		–		3	–	6	–	0
Colorado College		–		2	–	6	–	0
Kentucky State		–		2	–	7	–	0
Milwaukee		–		2	–	7	–	0
Lake Forest		–		2	–	8	–	0
Northern Illinois		–		2	–	8	–	0
Mississippi Valley State		–		1	–	7	–	0
UC San Diego		–		0	–	7	–	0
Rose Poly		–		0	–	8	–	0
Cal Poly Pomona		–		0	–	10	–	0
Rankings from AP small college poll

The 1968 San Diego State Aztecs football team represented San Diego State College (Note: San Diego State University was known as San Diego State College from 1935 to 1971.) during the 1968 NCAA College Division football season.

This was San Diego State's last year in the College Division of the NCAA. They had been a member of the California Collegiate Athletic Association (CCAA) for the previous 29 years, but competed as an Independent during the 1968 season. The team was led by head coach Don Coryell, in his eighth year, and played their home games at San Diego Stadium (Note: San Diego County Credit Union Stadium (SDCCU Stadium) was known as San Diego Stadium from its opening in 1967 through 1980.) in San Diego, California.

The team finished the season undefeated for the second time under Coach Coryell, with nine wins, zero losses, and one tie (9–0–1). At the end of the season, the Aztecs were voted the College Division national champion for the third consecutive year in the UPI small college football rankings and No. 2 in the AP small college football rankings.

== Schedule ==
Date	Opponent	Rank	Site	Result	Attendance	Source
September 14	UT Arlington*		San Diego Stadium; San Diego, CA	W 23–18	35,227	
September 20	Northern Illinois*		San Diego Stadium; San Diego, CA	W 40–21	30,560	
September 28	at Montana State*	No. 1	Gatton Field; Bozeman, MT	W 34–22	9,000	
October 12	Texas Southern*	No. 1	San Diego Stadium; San Diego, CA	W 42–23	38,305	
October 19	Cal State Los Angeles*	No. 1	San Diego Stadium; San Diego, CA	W 37–14	44,169	
October 26	San Jose State*	No. 1	San Diego Stadium; San Diego, CA	W 48–6	34,641	
November 2	Fresno State*	No. 1	San Diego Stadium; San Diego, CA (rivalry)	W 42–12	24,387	
November 9	Southern Miss*	No. 1	San Diego Stadium; San Diego, CA	W 68–7	43,766	
November 23	Tennessee State*	No. 1	San Diego Stadium; San Diego, CA	T 13–13	37,713	
November 30	Utah State*	No. 2	San Diego Stadium; San Diego, CA	W 30–19	37,425	
*Non-conference game; Rankings from AP Poll released prior to the game

== Roster ==
1968 San Diego State Aztecs football team roster
Players
Coaches
Offense

Pos.	#	Name	Class
QB	12	Dennis Shaw

Defense

Pos.	#	Name	Class
DE	77	Fred Dryer
S	27	Nate Wright

Special teams

Pos.	#	Name	Class

Head coach

Don Coryell

Coordinators/assistant coaches

Legend

- (C) Team captain
- (S) Suspended
- (I) Ineligible
- Injured
- Redshirt

== Team players in the NFL/AFL ==
The following San Diego State players were selected in the 1969 NFL/AFL draft.

Player	Position	Round	Overall	NFL team
Fred Dryer	Defensive end	1	13	New York Giants
Lloyd Edwards	Tight end	3	75	Oakland Raiders
Tom Nettles	Flanker	7	179	Kansas City Chiefs
Doug Fisher	Linebacker	12	290	Pittsburgh Steelers

The following finished their college career in 1968, were not drafted, but played in the NFL.

Player	Position	First NFL Team
Clancy Oliver	Defensive back	1969 Pittsburgh Steelers
Nate Wright	Defensive back	1969 Atlanta Falcons

== Team awards ==
Award	Player
Most Valuable Player (John Simcox Memorial Trophy)	Tom Nettles
Outstanding Offensive & Defensive Linemen (Byron H. Chase Memorial Trophy)	Larry Findley, Off; Fred Dryer, Def
Team captains Dr. R. Hardy / C.E. Peterson Memorial Trophy	Dennis Shaw, Off; Mike Meagher, Def
Most Inspirational Player	Mike Meagher
