= 1968 NCAA College Division football season =

American college football season

- Champion(s): North Dakota State (AP); San Diego State (UPI); Alcorn A&M (black); North Carolina A&T (black)

The 1968 NCAA College Division football season was the 13th season of college football in the United States organized by the National Collegiate Athletic Association at the NCAA College Division level.

== Conference standings ==
1968 Big Sky Conference football standings
	Conf.					Overall
Team	W		L		T	W		L		T
Weber State +	3	–	1	–	0	7	–	2	–	0
Montana State +	3	–	1	–	0	6	–	4	–	0
Idaho +	3	–	1	–	0	5	–	5	–	0
Idaho State	1	–	3	–	0	4	–	5	–	0
Montana	0	–	4	–	0	2	–	7	–	0
+ – Conference co-champions

1968 California Collegiate Athletic Association football standings
	Conf.					Overall
Team	W		L		T	W		L		T
No. 18 Fresno State $	4	–	0	–	0	7	–	4	–	0
Cal Poly	2	–	2	–	0	7	–	3	–	0
Cal State Los Angeles	2	–	2	–	0	6	–	3	–	0
Valley State	1	–	3	–	0	5	–	4	–	0
Long Beach State	1	–	3	–	0	3	–	7	–	0
$ – Conference champion; Rankings from UPI small college poll

1968 Central Intercollegiate Athletic Association football standings
	Conf.					Overall
Team	W		L		T	W		L		T
No. 12 Morgan State $	7	–	1	–	0	8	–	1	–	0
No. 14 North Carolina A&T	6	–	1	–	0	8	–	1	–	0
North Carolina College	6	–	2	–	0	6	–	2	–	0
Elizabeth City State	7	–	1	–	0	8	–	1	–	0
Maryland State	3	–	2	–	1	5	–	2	–	1
Virginia State	5	–	2	–	1	5	–	2	–	1
Hampton	4	–	2	–	1	4	–	3	–	2
Livingstone	4	–	3	–	0	4	–	4	–	0
Howard	2	–	3	–	0	3	–	5	–	0
Norfolk State	2	–	4	–	1	2	–	5	–	1
Johnson C. Smith	3	–	3	–	0	5	–	4	–	0
Virginia Union	2	–	6	–	0	2	–	6	–	0
Delaware State	2	–	4	–	0	4	–	6	–	0
Winston-Salem State	2	–	5	–	1	3	–	5	–	1
Fayetteville State	2	–	5	–	0	2	–	5	–	0
Shaw	1	–	7	–	1	1	–	7	–	1
Saint Paul's (VA)	0	–	7	–	0	1	–	7	–	0
$ – Conference champion; Conference standings were determined by Dickinson Rating; Rankings from NAIA poll for North Carolina A&T and AP small college poll for Morgan State

1968 Central Intercollegiate Conference football standings
	Conf.					Overall
Team	W		L		T	W		L		T
Nebraska–Omaha $	4	–	0	–	0	4	–	5	–	0
Emporia State	2	–	1	–	1	5	–	2	–	2
Pittsburg State	2	–	1	–	1	4	–	5	–	1
Washburn	1	–	3	–	0	2	–	7	–	0
Fort Hays State	0	–	4	–	0	2	–	7	–	0
$ – Conference champion

1968 College Athletic Conference football standings
	Conf.					Overall
Team	W		L		T	W		L		T
Centre +	3	–	1	–	0	5	–	3	–	1
Southwestern (TN) +	3	–	1	–	0	4	–	5	–	0
Sewanee	2	–	2	–	0	4	–	4	–	0
Washington and Lee	2	–	2	–	0	3	–	5	–	1
Washington University	0	–	4	–	0	2	–	8	–	0
+ – Conference co-champions

1968 College Conference of Illinois and Wisconsin football standings
	Conf.					Overall
Team	W		L		T	W		L		T
Augustana (IL) $	6	–	1	–	0	6	–	3	–	0
Illinois Wesleyan	5	–	2	–	0	6	–	3	–	0
North Park	5	–	2	–	0	6	–	3	–	0
Carroll (WI)	4	–	3	–	0	5	–	3	–	0
Carthage	4	–	3	–	0	4	–	5	–	0
Millikin	3	–	4	–	0	3	–	5	–	0
North Central (IL)	1	–	6	–	0	1	–	8	–	0
Elmhurst	0	–	7	–	0	0	–	9	–	0
$ – Conference champion

1968 Eastern Football Conference football standings
	Conf.					Overall
Team	W		L		T	W		L		T
Southern Connecticut State $	4	–	0	–	1	4	–	4	–	1
Central Connecticut State	3	–	2	–	0	6	–	2	–	1
Bridgeport	3	–	2	–	0	4	–	5	–	0
Trenton State	2	–	2	–	1	5	–	2	–	1
Glassboro State	1	–	4	–	0	2	–	6	–	0
Montclair State	1	–	4	–	0	2	–	7	–	0
$ – Conference champion

1968 Far Western Conference football standings
	Conf.					Overall
Team	W		L		T	W		L		T
No. 16 AP / #10 UPI Humboldt State $	6	–	0	–	0	10	–	1	–	0
Sacramento State	4	–	2	–	0	8	–	3	–	0
UC Davis	3	–	3	–	0	5	–	4	–	0
San Francisco State	3	–	3	–	0	5	–	5	–	0
Chico State	2	–	4	–	0	5	–	5	–	0
Cal State Hayward	1	–	4	–	1	5	–	4	–	1
Nevada	1	–	4	–	1	3	–	6	–	1
$ – Conference champion; Rankings from small college polls

1968 Gulf States Conference football standings
	Conf.					Overall
Team	W		L		T	W		L		T
No. 8/10 Southwestern Louisiana $	4	–	1	–	0	8	–	2	–	0
Louisiana Tech	3	–	2	–	0	9	–	2	–	0
Northeast Louisiana State	3	–	2	–	0	6	–	4	–	0
Northwestern State	2	–	3	–	0	5	–	4	–	0
Southeastern Louisiana	2	–	3	–	0	4	–	6	–	0
McNeese State	1	–	4	–	0	4	–	6	–	0
$ – Conference champion; Rankings from NAIA poll and AP small college poll

1968 Independent College Athletic Conference football standings
	Conf.					Overall
Team	W		L		T	W		L		T
Union (NY) $	3	–	0	–	0	7	–	1	–	0
Alfred	1	–	1	–	0	2	–	5	–	0
RPI	1	–	1	–	0	2	–	7	–	0
Hobart	1	–	2	–	0	3	–	5	–	0
St. Lawrence	1	–	3	–	0	2	–	6	–	0
$ – Conference champion

1968 Indiana Collegiate Conference football standings
	Conf.					Overall
Team	W		L		T	W		L		T
Valparaiso $	4	–	0	–	0	4	–	5	–	0
DePauw	3	–	1	–	0	6	–	3	–	0
Evansville	2	–	2	–	0	3	–	6	–	0
Butler	1	–	3	–	0	2	–	7	–	0
Saint Joseph's (IN)	0	–	4	–	0	1	–	8	–	0
$ – Conference champion

1968 Interstate Intercollegiate Athletic Conference football standings
	Conf.					Overall
Team	W		L		T	W		L		T
Central Michigan +	2	–	1	–	0	7	–	2	–	0
Illinois State +	2	–	1	–	0	6	–	4	–	0
Eastern Illinois	1	–	2	–	0	4	–	5	–	0
Western Illinois	1	–	2	–	0	2	–	7	–	1
+ – Conference co-champions

1968 Iowa Conference football standings
	Conf.					Overall
Team	W		L		T	W		L		T
Wartburg $	6	–	0	–	1	7	–	1	–	1
Simpson (IA)	5	–	0	–	2	6	–	1	–	2
Upper Iowa	4	–	3	–	0	4	–	4	–	0
Central (IA)	3	–	3	–	1	5	–	3	–	1
Dubuque	3	–	4	–	0	4	–	5	–	0
William Penn	2	–	5	–	0	4	–	5	–	0
Buena Vista	2	–	5	–	0	2	–	7	–	0
Luther	1	–	6	–	0	2	–	7	–	0
$ – Conference champion

1968 Little Three Conference football standings
	Conf.					Overall
Team	W		L		T	W		L		T
Amherst $	2	–	0	–	0	7	–	1	–	0
Wesleyan	1	–	1	–	0	5	–	3	–	0
Williams	0	–	2	–	0	4	–	4	–	0
$ – Conference champion

1968 Maine Intercollegiate Athletic Association football standings
	Conf.					Overall
Team	W		L		T	W		L		T
Bowdoin $	2	–	0	–	0	2	–	5	–	0
Bates	1	–	1	–	0	5	–	4	–	0
Colby	0	–	2	–	0	0	–	7	–	1
$ – Conference champion

1968 Mason–Dixon Conference football standings
	Conf.					Overall
Team	W		L		T	W		L		T
Randolph–Macon $	5	–	0	–	0	9	–	0	–	0
Bridgewater	3	–	1	–	0	5	–	3	–	0
Johns Hopkins	1	–	1	–	0	7	–	2	–	0
Western Maryland	2	–	2	–	0	5	–	4	–	0
Hampden–Sydney	1	–	3	–	0	3	–	5	–	2
Shepherd	1	–	3	–	0	2	–	7	–	0
Gallaudet	0	–	3	–	0	1	–	7	–	0
Towson State	0	–	0	–	0	2	–	5	–	0
$ – Conference champion; Conference standings were based on the Dickinson Scoring System.

1968 Michigan Intercollegiate Athletic Association football standings
	Conf.					Overall
Team	W		L		T	W		L		T
No. 12 Alma $	5	–	0	–	0	8	–	0	–	0
Albion	4	–	1	–	0	6	–	3	–	0
Hope	2	–	3	–	0	4	–	5	–	0
Olivet	2	–	3	–	0	3	–	5	–	0
Kalamazoo	1	–	4	–	0	2	–	6	–	0
Adrian	1	–	4	–	0	1	–	7	–	0
$ – Conference champion; Rankings from NAIA poll

1968 Middle Atlantic Conference football standings
	Conf.					Overall
Team	W		L		T	W		L		T
University Division
Delaware x	5	–	0	–	0	7	–	3	–	0
Bucknell	3	–	2	–	0	5	–	5	–	0
Lehigh	2	–	2	–	0	3	–	7	–	0
Lafayette	2	–	2	–	0	7	–	3	–	0
Temple	2	–	2	–	0	4	–	6	–	0
Hofstra	1	–	3	–	0	5	–	5	–	0
Gettysburg	1	–	4	–	0	1	–	8	–	0
West Chester *	0	–	1	–	0	5	–	3	–	0
Northern College Division
Albright x	7	–	0	–	0	8	–	1	–	0
No. T–19 Wilkes x	6	–	0	–	0	8	–	0	–	0
Delaware Valley	5	–	2	–	0	6	–	2	–	0
Juniata	4	–	2	–	0	7	–	2	–	0
Upsala	3	–	4	–	0	4	–	4	–	0
Moravian	3	–	6	–	0	3	–	6	–	0
Susquehanna	1	–	5	–	0	2	–	6	–	1
Lycoming	1	–	7	–	0	1	–	7	–	0
Wagner *	3	–	1	–	0	3	–	6	–	0
Southern College Division
Franklin & Marshall x	6	–	1	–	0	6	–	2	–	0
Johns Hopkins x	6	–	1	–	0	7	–	2	–	0
Muhlenberg	6	–	3	–	0	6	–	3	–	0
Western Maryland	3	–	3	–	0	5	–	4	–	0
Lebanon Valley	4	–	4	–	0	4	–	4	–	0
Ursinus	3	–	5	–	0	3	–	5	–	0
Pennsylvania Military	2	–	5	–	0	2	–	7	–	0
Haverford	1	–	6	–	0	1	–	6	–	0
Swarthmore	1	–	6	–	0	1	–	7	–	0
Dickinson	1	–	7	–	0	1	–	7	–	0
Drexel *	3	–	1	–	0	4	–	4	–	0
x – Division champion/co-champions; * – Ineligible for championship due to insufficient conference games; Rankings from AP small college poll

1968 Midwest Conference football standings
	Conf.					Overall
Team	W		L		T	W		L		T
Ripon $	7	–	1	–	0	7	–	1	–	0
Monmouth (IL)	6	–	1	–	1	6	–	1	–	1
Cornell (IA)	6	–	2	–	0	6	–	2	–	0
St. Olaf	5	–	2	–	1	5	–	2	–	1
Coe	4	–	4	–	0	4	–	4	–	0
Beloit	3	–	5	–	0	3	–	5	–	0
Carleton	3	–	5	–	0	3	–	5	–	0
Grinnell	3	–	5	–	0	3	–	5	–	0
Lawrence	2	–	6	–	0	2	–	6	–	0
Knox	0	–	8	–	0	0	–	8	–	0
$ – Conference champion

1968 Minnesota Intercollegiate Athletic Conference football standings
	Conf.					Overall
Team	W		L		T	W		L		T
Gustavus Adolphus $	6	–	0	–	1	7	–	1	–	1
No. 18 Hamline	6	–	1	–	0	8	–	1	–	0
Concordia (MN)	4	–	3	–	0	7	–	3	–	0
Saint John's (MN)	4	–	3	–	0	6	–	4	–	0
Macalester	3	–	3	–	1	5	–	4	–	1
Minnesota–Duluth	2	–	5	–	0	4	–	6	–	0
St. Thomas (MN)	2	–	5	–	0	2	–	8	–	0
Augsburg	0	–	7	–	0	1	–	8	–	0
$ – Conference champion; Rankings from NAIA poll

1968 Missouri Intercollegiate Athletic Association football standings
	Conf.					Overall
Team	W		L		T	W		L		T
SE Missouri State $	5	–	0	–	0	6	–	4	–	0
Central Missouri State	4	–	1	–	0	7	–	2	–	1
NE Missouri State	2	–	3	–	0	5	–	4	–	0
Missouri–Rolla	2	–	3	–	0	4	–	5	–	0
SW Missouri State	2	–	3	–	0	2	–	8	–	0
NW Missouri State	0	–	5	–	0	0	–	9	–	0
$ – Conference champion

1968 North Central Conference football standings
	Conf.					Overall
Team	W		L		T	W		L		T
No. 1 North Dakota State $	6	–	0	–	0	10	–	0	–	0
No. 8 South Dakota	5	–	1	–	0	9	–	1	–	0
State College of Iowa	3	–	3	–	0	5	–	5	–	0
North Dakota	3	–	3	–	0	3	–	5	–	0
South Dakota State	2	–	4	–	0	4	–	6	–	0
Morningside	2	–	4	–	0	4	–	5	–	0
Augustana (SD)	0	–	6	–	0	2	–	7	–	0
$ – Conference champion; Rankings from AP small college poll

1968 Northern Intercollegiate Conference football standings
	Conf.					Overall
Team	W		L		T	W		L		T
Mankato State +	4	–	1	–	0	5	–	4	–	0
Winona State +	4	–	1	–	0	5	–	4	–	0
St. Cloud State	3	–	2	–	0	5	–	3	–	1
Moorhead State	3	–	2	–	0	4	–	5	–	0
Bemidji State	1	–	4	–	0	3	–	6	–	0
Michigan Tech	0	–	5	–	0	1	–	7	–	0
Minnesota Morris *			–			7	–	1	–	0
+ – Conference co-champions; * – did not compete for championship

1968 Ohio Athletic Conference football standings
	Conf.					Overall
Team	W		L		T	W		L		T
Baldwin–Wallace $	4	–	0	–	0	8	–	1	–	0
Ohio Wesleyan	6	–	1	–	0	8	–	1	–	0
Marietta	6	–	1	–	0	7	–	2	–	0
Muskingum	5	–	2	–	0	6	–	2	–	1
Wooster	5	–	2	–	0	6	–	3	–	0
Wittenberg	3	–	2	–	0	6	–	3	–	0
Capital	4	–	3	–	0	5	–	3	–	0
Mount Union	3	–	3	–	0	5	–	4	–	0
Kenyon	2	–	3	–	0	5	–	4	–	0
Denison	2	–	4	–	0	4	–	5	–	0
Otterbein	2	–	4	–	0	3	–	6	–	0
Oberlin	1	–	5	–	0	2	–	5	–	1
Heidelberg	0	–	6	–	0	2	–	7	–	0
Hiram	0	–	7	–	0	1	–	7	–	0
$ – Conference champion

1968 Ohio Valley Conference football standings
	Conf.					Overall
Team	W		L		T	W		L		T
No. 9/8 Eastern Kentucky $	7	–	0	–	0	8	–	2	–	0
No. 19/17 Western Kentucky	5	–	2	–	0	7	–	2	–	1
Murray State	5	–	2	–	0	7	–	2	–	1
East Tennessee State	4	–	3	–	0	5	–	5	–	0
Austin Peay	3	–	4	–	0	5	–	5	–	0
Tennessee Tech	2	–	5	–	0	2	–	8	–	0
Morehead State	1	–	6	–	0	3	–	6	–	1
Middle Tennessee	1	–	6	–	0	2	–	8	–	0
$ – Conference champion; Rankings from AP/UPI small college polls

1968 Pennsylvania State College Athletic Conference football standings
	Conf.					Overall
Team	W		L		T	W		L		T
East Division
East Stroudsburg xy+	6	–	0	–	0	8	–	0	–	1
West Chester	5	–	1	–	0	6	–	3	–	0
Bloomsburg	3	–	3	–	0	3	–	4	–	1
Kutztown	2	–	3	–	1	3	–	4	–	1
Millersville	2	–	3	–	1	2	–	5	–	1
Mansfield	2	–	4	–	0	2	–	7	–	0
Cheyney	0	–	6	–	0	0	–	8	–	0
West Division
California (PA) xy+	5	–	0	–	0	6	–	2	–	1
Clarion	4	–	1	–	0	6	–	3	–	0
Shippensburg	3	–	2	–	0	5	–	3	–	0
Slippery Rock	2	–	3	–	0	3	–	6	–	0
Lock Haven	1	–	4	–	0	2	–	7	–	0
Edinboro	0	–	5	–	0	2	–	7	–	0
Championship: California 28, East Stroudsburg 28
+ – Conference co-champions; x – Division champion/co-champions; y – Championship game participant; Cheyney forfeited games to West Chester and Millersville.

1968 Presidents' Athletic Conference football standings
	Conf.					Overall
Team	W		L		T	W		L		T
Allegheny $	6	–	0	–	0	7	–	1	–	0
Thiel	4	–	2	–	0	6	–	2	–	0
Bethany (WV)	4	–	2	–	0	4	–	4	–	0
John Carroll	4	–	2	–	0	4	–	4	–	0
Western Reserve	2	–	4	–	0	2	–	6	–	0
Washington & Jefferson	1	–	5	–	0	1	–	7	–	0
Case Tech	0	–	6	–	0	0	–	7	–	0
$ – Conference champion

1968 Rocky Mountain Athletic Conference football standings
	Conf.					Overall
Team	W		L		T	W		L		T
Adams State $	3	–	0	–	0	8	–	1	–	0
Colorado State–Greeley	1	–	1	–	0	5	–	3	–	0
Western State (CO)	1	–	2	–	0	3	–	6	–	0
Colorado Mines	0	–	2	–	0	4	–	4	–	0
$ – Conference champion

1968 Southern California Intercollegiate Athletic Conference football standings
	Conf.					Overall
Team	W		L		T	W		L		T
Whittier $	4	–	1	–	0	5	–	4	–	0
Occidental	3	–	1	–	1	3	–	5	–	1
Redlands	3	–	2	–	0	5	–	5	–	0
Claremont-Mudd	2	–	2	–	1	3	–	4	–	2
Pomona	2	–	3	–	0	4	–	5	–	1
Caltech	0	–	5	–	0	1	–	7	–	0
$ – Conference champion; Caltech forfeited to Whittier and Redlands; the forfeits were included only in conference records.

1968 Southern Intercollegiate Athletic Conference football standings
	Conf.					Overall
Team	W		L		T	W		L		T
Division I
No. T–19 Florida A&M x	5	–	0	–	0	8	–	2	–	0
South Carolina State	4	–	1	–	0	7	–	2	–	0
Bethune–Cookman	3	–	2	–	0	4	–	4	–	0
Alabama A&M	2	–	3	–	0	5	–	4	–	0
Morris Brown	1	–	4	–	0	2	–	7	–	0
Allen	0	–	5	–	0	0	–	7	–	0
Division II
Tuskegee x	6	–	0	–	0	8	–	2	–	0
Alabama State	4	–	1	–	1	8	–	1	–	1
Lane	4	–	1	–	0	6	–	2	–	0
Fort Valley State	4	–	2	–	0	7	–	2	–	0
Clark (GA)	3	–	4	–	0	4	–	5	–	0
Morehouse	2	–	3	–	1	3	–	3	–	2
Fisk	1	–	6	–	0	2	–	8	–	0
Knoxville	0	–	7	–	0	0	–	7	–	0
x – Division champion/co-champions; Rankings from UPI small college poll

1968 Southland Conference football standings
	Conf.					Overall
Team	W		L		T	W		L		T
No. 15 Arkansas State $	3	–	0	–	1	7	–	3	–	1
UT Arlington	3	–	1	–	0	6	–	4	–	0
Trinity (TX)	2	–	2	–	0	5	–	4	–	0
Abilene Christian	1	–	2	–	1	4	–	5	–	1
Lamar Tech	0	–	4	–	0	0	–	10	–	0
$ – Conference champion; Rankings from AP small college poll

1968 Southwestern Athletic Conference football standings
	Conf.					Overall
Team	W		L		T	W		L		T
No. 3 Alcorn A&M +	6	–	1	–	0	8	–	1	–	0
Grambling +	6	–	1	–	0	9	–	2	–	0
Texas Southern +	6	–	1	–	0	6	–	4	–	0
Arkansas AM&N	4	–	3	–	0	5	–	5	–	0
Southern	3	–	4	–	0	4	–	6	–	0
Prairie View A&M	2	–	5	–	0	4	–	6	–	0
Jackson State	1	–	6	–	0	3	–	6	–	0
Wiley	0	–	7	–	0	2	–	8	–	0
+ – Conference co-champions; Rankings from NAIA poll

1968 Yankee Conference football standings
	Conf.					Overall
Team	W		L		T	W		L		T
New Hampshire +	4	–	1	–	0	6	–	2	–	0
Connecticut +	4	–	1	–	0	4	–	6	–	0
Maine	2	–	3	–	0	3	–	5	–	0
Rhode Island	2	–	3	–	0	3	–	6	–	0
UMass	2	–	3	–	0	2	–	8	–	0
Vermont	1	–	4	–	0	3	–	6	–	0
+ – Conference co-champions

1968 NCAA College Division independents football records
	Conf.			Overall
Team	W	L	T	W		L		T
No. 2 San Diego State		–		9	–	0	–	1
No. 3 Chattanooga		–		9	–	1	–	0
Indiana State		–		9	–	1	–	0
Indiana (PA)		–		9	–	1	–	0
Nevada Southern		–		8	–	1	–	0
UC Riverside		–		7	–	1	–	1
Ashland		–		8	–	2	–	0
No. 7 Eastern Michigan		–		8	–	2	–	0
Lincoln (MO)		–		8	–	2	–	0
St. Norbert		–		6	–	2	–	1
Tennessee State		–		6	–	2	–	1
Hawaii		–		7	–	3	–	0
No. 14 Tampa		–		7	–	3	–	0
No. 17 Akron		–		7	–	3	–	1
Northeastern		–		6	–	3	–	0
Southern Illinois		–		6	–	3	–	0
Cortland		–		5	–	3	–	0
Boston University		–		5	–	3	–	1
Northern Arizona		–		6	–	4	–	0
Pacific (CA)		–		6	–	4	–	0
Samford		–		6	–	4	–	0
Northern Michigan		–		5	–	4	–	0
Parsons		–		5	–	4	–	0
Drake		–		5	–	5	–	0
UC Santa Barbara		–		4	–	4	–	1
Santa Clara		–		4	–	5	–	0
Portland State		–		4	–	6	–	0
Wayne State (MI)		–		3	–	6	–	0
Wabash		–		3	–	6	–	0
Colorado College		–		2	–	6	–	0
Kentucky State		–		2	–	7	–	0
Milwaukee		–		2	–	7	–	0
Lake Forest		–		2	–	8	–	0
Northern Illinois		–		2	–	8	–	0
Mississippi Valley State		–		1	–	7	–	0
UC San Diego		–		0	–	7	–	0
Rose Poly		–		0	–	8	–	0
Cal Poly Pomona		–		0	–	10	–	0
Rankings from AP small college poll

== Rankings ==
College Division teams (also referred to as "small college") were ranked in polls by the AP (a panel of writers) and by UPI (coaches). The national champion(s) for each season were determined by the final poll rankings, published at or near the end of the regular season, before any bowl games were played.

=== Small college final polls ===
In 1968, the wire services disagreed as to the champion. UPI picked San Diego State (9–0–1) as number one, while the AP panel chose North Dakota State. San Diego State did not play in the postseason, while North Dakota State later won the Pecan Bowl to finish 10–0.

United Press International (coaches) final poll
Published on November 27

Rank	School	Record	No. 1 votes	Total points
1	San Diego State	8–0–1†	21	312
2	North Dakota State	9–0	9	300
3	Chattanooga	9–1†		236
4	New Mexico Highlands	9–0	4	209
5	Texas A&I	9–1†		184
6	Morgan State	8–1		129
7	Troy State	9–1		80
8	Eastern Kentucky	8–2		69
9	Adams State	8–1		52
10	Humboldt State	9–1		47

†Denotes team won a game after UPI poll, hence record differs in AP poll

Associated Press (writers) final poll
Published on December 5

Rank	School	Record	No. 1 votes	Total points
1	North Dakota State.	9–0	6	220
2	San Diego State	9–0–1	3	204
3	Chattanooga	10–1	1	162
4	New Mexico Highlands	9–0		147
5	IUP	9–0	1	142
6	Texas A&I	10–1	1	125
7	Eastern Michigan	8–2		97
8	South Dakota	9–1		77
9	Eastern Kentucky	8–2		72
10	Southwestern Louisiana	8–2		51

== Bowl games ==
The postseason consisted of four bowl games as regional finals, all played on December 14. The Boardwalk Bowl succeeded the Tangerine Bowl, and the Pecan Bowl moved within Texas, from Abilene to Arlington. In 1969, the Grantland Rice Bowl moved from Murfreesboro, Tennessee to Baton Rouge, Louisiana.

Bowl	Region	Location	Winning team		Losing team		Ref
Boardwalk	East	Atlantic City, New Jersey	Delaware	31	IUP	24	
Grantland Rice	Mideast	Murfreesboro, Tennessee	Louisiana Tech	33	Akron	13	
Pecan	Midwest	Arlington, Texas	North Dakota State	23	Arkansas State	14	
Camellia	West	Sacramento, California	Humboldt State	29	Fresno State	14	

== See also ==
- 1968 NCAA University Division football season
- 1968 NAIA football season
