= 1968 small college football rankings =

- Selectors: AP, UPI
- No. 1: North Dakota State (AP)
- No. 1: San Diego State (UPI)
- Small college football rankings (AP, UPI)
- «1967 1969»

The 1968 small college football rankings are rankings of college football teams representing smaller college and university teams during the 1968 college football season, including the 1968 NCAA College Division football season and the 1968 NAIA football season. Separate rankings were published by the Associated Press (AP) and the United Press International (UPI). The AP rankings were selected by a board of sports writers, and the UPI rankings were selected by a board of small-college coaches.

North Dakota State (10–0) and San Diego State were ranked as the top two teams: North Dakota State No. 1 by the AP and No. 2 by the UPI; and San Diego State No. 1 by the UPI and No. 2 by the AP. Chattanooga (9–1) and New Mexico Highlands (9–0) were ranked third and fourth, respectively, in both polls.

== Legend ==
	Increase in ranking
	Decrease in ranking
	Not ranked previous week
(#–#)	Win–loss record
(Italics)	Number of first place votes
т	Tied with team above or below also with this symbol

== AP poll ==
	Week 1 Sept 26	Week 2 Oct 3	Week 3 Oct 10	Week 4 Oct 17	Week 5 Oct 24	Week 6 Oct 31	Week 7 Nov 7	Week 8 Nov 14	Week 9 Nov 21	Week 10 Nov 28	Week 11 Dec 5	
1.	San Diego State (2–0) (12)	San Diego State (3–0) (12)	San Diego State (3–0) (9)	San Diego State (4–0) (10)	San Diego State (5–0) (10)	San Diego State (6–0) (14)	San Diego State (7–0) (10)	San Diego State (8–0) (11)	San Diego State (8–0) (12)	North Dakota State (9–0) (5)	North Dakota State (9–0) (6)	1.
2.	Eastern Kentucky (1–0) (1)	North Dakota State (3–0)	North Dakota State (4–0) (1)	North Dakota State (5–0)	North Dakota State (6–0)	North Dakota State (7–0)	North Dakota State (8–0) (1)	North Dakota State (9–0) (1)	North Dakota State (7–2) (1)	San Diego State (8–0–1) (3)	San Diego State (9–0–1) (3)	2.
3.	North Dakota State (2–0)	Eastern Kentucky (2–0) (2)	Eastern Kentucky (3–0)	Eastern Kentucky (4–0)	Western Kentucky (6–0) (2)	Chattanooga (7–0) (1)	Chattanooga (8–0) (1)	New Mexico Highlands (9–0)	New Mexico Highlands (9–0)	New Mexico Highlands (9–0) (1)	Chattanooga (10–1) (1)	3.
4.	Lenoir–Rhyne	Northern Michigan (4–0)	Northern Michigan (4–0) (1)	Western Kentucky (4–0) (2)	New Mexico Highlands (7–0)	New Mexico Highlands (8–0)	New Mexico Highlands (9–0) (1)	Tampa (7–1)	Chattanooga (9–1)	Chattanooga (10–1) (1)	New Mexico Highlands (9–0)	4.
5.	Akron	Lenoir–Rhyne	New Mexico Highlands (4–0)	Texas A&I (4–0) (1)	Chattanooga (6–0)	Weber State (6–0)	Tampa (6–1)	Chattanooga (8–1)	IUP (9–0) (1)	IUP (9–0) (1)	IUP (9–0) (1)	5.
6.	Texas–Arlington (1–1) (Note: In the actual printed polls, Texas–Arlington was listed as Texas at Arlington (UPI))	Weber State	Texas A&I (3–0) (1)	New Mexico Highlands (5–0)	Weber State (5–0)	Tampa (5–1)	Eastern Kentucky (6–1)	Eastern Kentucky (7–1) (1)	Texas A&I (8–1) (1)	Texas A&I (9–1) (1)	Texas A&I (10–1) (1)	6.
7.	Northern Michigan (3–0) (1)	Texas A&I (2–0)	Weber State	Weber State (4–0)	Northern Michigan (6–1)	Eastern Kentucky (5–1)	IUP (8–0) (1)	Texas A&I (7–1) (1)	Tampa (7–2)	Eastern Michigan (8–2)	Eastern Michigan (8–2)	7.
8.	Central Michigan	New Mexico Highlands (3–0)	Lenoir–Rhyne (1)	Northern Michigan	Arkansas State (6–1) (1)	IUP (7–0) (1)	Texas A&I (6–1)	Western Kentucky (8–1)	Eastern Michigan (8–2)	South Dakota (9–1)	South Dakota (9–1)	8.
9.	Fairmont State	Fairmont State	Morgan State	Chattanooga (4–0)	IUP (6–0)	Morgan State (5–0)	Western Kentucky (7–1)	IUP (9–0) (1)	Western Kentucky (8–1–1)	Eastern Kentucky (8–2)	Eastern Kentucky (8–2)	9.
10.	Texas A&I (1–0)	Tennessee A&I	Western Kentucky (1)	Arkansas State (4–1)	Texas A&I (4–1)	Western Kentucky (6–1)	Arkansas State (7–1–1)	Weber State (7–1)	Eastern Kentucky (7–2)	Willamette (9–0) (2)	Southwestern Louisiana (8–2)	10.
11.	Tennessee A&I	Louisiana Tech (2–0)	Arkansas State (3–1)	Morgan State	Eastern Kentucky (4–1)	Texas A&I (5–1)	Weber State (6–1)	Central Missouri State (7–0–1) (1)	Morgan State (7–1)	Morgan State (8–1)	Troy State (9–1)	11.
12.	Weber State	Texas–Arlington	Louisiana Tech (2–1)	Texas–Arlington	Morgan State (4–0)	Texas–Arlington (4–3)	Lenoir–Rhyne (6–1)	Morgan State (6–1)	Willamette (9–0)	Manual	Morgan State (8–1)	12.
13.	New Mexico Highlands	Morgan State	Tennessee A&I	IUP (1)	Appalachian State (5–0) (2)	Arkansas State (6–1–1)	Appalachian State (6–1)	Troy State (8–1)	South Dakota (9–1)	Humboldt State (9–1) (1)	Willamette (9–0)	13.
14.	Western Kentucky	Eastern Washington (2–0)	Trinity (TX)	Tampa (3–1)	Tampa (4–1)	Northern Michigan (6–2)	Morgan State (5–1)	South Dakota (8–1)	Central Missouri State (7–1–1)	Troy State (9–1)	Tampa (7–3)	14.
15.	Louisiana Tech	Arkansas State	IUP (1)	Appalachian State (1)	Akron (4–2)	Akron (4–2)	Akron (5–2)	Akron (6–2)	Troy State (9–1)	Western Kentucky (8–2–1) (1)	Arkansas State (7–2–1)	15.
16.	Wittenberg	Western Kentucky	Tampa (3–0)	Trinity (TX)	East Texas State (4–1)	Central Michigan (6–1) (1)	Troy State (8–0)	Willamette (8–0)	Akron (6–2–1)	Tampa (7–3)	Humboldt State (9–1)	16.
17.	West Chester	Tampa т	Chattanooga (3–0)	Tennessee A&I	Lenoir–Rhyne (4–1) т	East Texas State (4–1)	Kings Point (7–0)	Texas–Arlington (5–3)	Kings Point (7–1)	Akron (7–2–1)	Akron (7–2–1)	17.
18.	Eastern Michigan т	Akron т	Illinois State	Eastern Michigan	Tennessee State (3–1) т	Lenoir–Rhyne (5–1)	Texas–Arlington (7–1) т	Appalachian State (7–1) т	Humboldt State (8–1)	Arkansas State (7–2–1)	Ferris State (7–0–1)	18.
19.	Eastern Washington (1–0) т	IUP	Wittenberg	Emory & Henry	Texas–Arlington (3–3) т	Troy State (7–0) т	Emory & Henry (7–1) т	Humboldt State (7–1) т	Arkansas State (7–2–1)	Central Missouri State (7–1–1)	Wilkes (8–0) т	19.
20.	Carson–Newman	Trinity (TX)	Fairmont State	Lenoir–Rhyne	Troy State (6–0) т	Appalachian State (5–1) т	Northern Michigan (6–3)	Kings Point (7–1)	Weber State (7–2)	Ferris State (7–0–1)	Western Kentucky (8–2–1) т	20.
21.					Willamette (5–0) т							21.
	Week 1 Sept 26	Week 2 Oct 3	Week 3 Oct 10	Week 4 Oct 17	Week 5 Oct 24	Week 6 Oct 31	Week 7 Nov 7	Week 8 Nov 14	Week 9 Nov 21	Week 10 Nov 28	Week 11 Dec 5	
		Dropped: 8 Central Michigan; 16 Wittenberg; 17 West Chester; 18 Eastern Michigan; 20 Carson–Newman	Dropped: 12 Texas–Arlington; 14 Eastern Washington; 18 Akron	Dropped: 12 Louisiana Tech; 18 Illinois State; 19 Wittenberg; 20 Fairmont State	Dropped: 16 Trinity (TX); 17 Tennessee A&I; 18 Eastern Michigan; 19 Emory & Henry	Dropped: 18 Tennessee State; 20 Willamette	Dropped: 16 Central Michigan; 17 East Texas State	Dropped: 10 Arkansas State; 12 Lenoir–Rhyne; 19 Emory & Henry; 20 Northern Michigan	Dropped: 17 Texas–Arlington; 18 Appalachian State	Dropped: 17 Kings Point; 20 Weber State	Dropped: 19 Central Missouri State	

== UPI coaches poll ==
	Week 1 Sept 25	Week 2 Oct 2	Week 3 Oct 9	Week 4 Oct 16	Week 5 Oct 23	Week 6 Oct 30	Week 7 Nov 6	Week 8 Nov 13	Week 9 Nov 20	Week 10 Nov 27	
1.	San Diego State (2–0) (26)	San Diego State (3–0) (27)	San Diego State (3–0) (25)	San Diego State (4–0) (25)	San Diego State (5–0) (22)	San Diego State (6–0) (26)	San Diego State (7–0) (28)	San Diego State (8–0)	San Diego State (8–0) (29)	San Diego State (8–0–1) (21)	1.
2.	North Dakota State (2–0) (2)	North Dakota State (3–0) (4)	North Dakota State (4–0) (5)	North Dakota State (5–0) (4)	North Dakota State (6–0) (5)	North Dakota State (7–0) (3)	North Dakota State (8–0) (3)	North Dakota State (9–0)	North Dakota State (9–0) (3)	North Dakota State (9–0) (9)	2.
3.	Northern Michigan (3–0)	Northern Michigan (4–0) (1)	Texas A&I (3–0)	Texas A&I (4–0)	New Mexico Highlands (6–0) (4)	Chattanooga (6–0)	Chattanooga (7–0)	Tampa (8–1)	New Mexico Highlands (9–0) (2)	Chattanooga (9–1)	3.
4.	Eastern Kentucky (1–0) (2)	Eastern Kentucky (2–0) (1)	Northern Michigan (4–0) (1)	Eastern Kentucky (4–0) (1)	Chattanooga (5–0)	Tampa (5–1)	Tampa (6–1)	New Mexico Highlands (9–0)	Chattanooga (8–1)	New Mexico Highlands (9–0) (4)	4.
5.	Texas A&I (1–0)	Texas A&I (2–0) (1)	Eastern Kentucky (3–0)	New Mexico Highlands (5–0) (3)	Tampa (4–1)	New Mexico Highlands (7–0) (4)	New Mexico Highlands (8–0) (3)	Chattanooga (7–1)	Texas A&I (8–1)	Texas A&I (9–1)	5.
6.	West Chester (1–0)	Eastern Washington (2–0)	New Mexico Highlands (4–0) (1)	Chattanooga (4–0)	Western Kentucky (5–0) (2)	Weber State (6–0) (1)	Eastern Kentucky (6–1)	Eastern Kentucky (7–1)	Morgan State (7–1)	Morgan State (8–1)	6.
7.	Texas–Arlington (1–1)	New Mexico Highlands (3–0)	Chattanooga (3–0) (1)	Arkansas State (4–1)	Weber State (5–0) (1)	Morgan State (5–0)	Texas A&I (6–1)	Texas A&I (7–1)	Tampa (7–2)	Troy State (9–1)	7.
8.	Eastern Washington (1–0)	Louisiana Tech (2–0)	Tampa (3–0) (1)	Tampa (3–1)	Morgan State (4–0)	Eastern Kentucky (5–1)	Troy State (8–0) (1)	Weber State (7–1)	Western Kentucky (7–1–1)	Eastern Kentucky (8–2)	8.
9.	Montana State (2–0)	Chattanooga (2–0)	Arkansas State (3–1)	Western Kentucky (4–0) (1)	Northern Michigan (5–1)	Texas A&I (5–1)	Arkansas State (6–1)	Morgan State (6–1)	Troy State (9–1)	Adams State (8–1)	9.
10.	Southwest Texas State (1–0)	Adams State (2–0)	Louisiana Tech (2–1)	Weber State (4–0)	Texas A&I (4–1)	Troy State (6–0) (1)	Weber State (6–1)	Western Kentucky (7–1)	Adams State (8–1)	Humboldt State (9–1)	10.
11.	Fairmont State	Arkansas State	Weber State	Morgan State	Arkansas State (6–1)	Arkansas State (6–1–1)	Morgan State (5–1)	Adams State	Eastern Kentucky (7–2)	Tampa (7–3)	11.
12.	New Mexico Highlands	Montana State	Texas–Arlington	C.W. Post	Troy State (6–0)	Western Kentucky (6–1)	Western Kentucky (7–1)	Willamette (8–0)	Humboldt State (8–1)	Willamette (9–0)	12.
13.	San Francisco State	Texas–Arlington	Morgan State	Alcorn A&M	Eastern Kentucky (4–1)	Willamette	Willamette	Humboldt State (7–1)	IUP (9–0)	IUP (9–0)	13.
14.	Adams State	Temple	Western Kentucky	Texas–Arlington	East Texas State (4–1)	Northern Michigan (6–2)	Arkansas Tech	North Carolina A&T	Willamette (9–0)	Arkansas State (7–2–1)	14.
15.	UMass (Note: In the actual printed polls, UMass was listed as Massachusetts)	Morgan State	Lenoir–Rhyne	Northern Iowa	Willamette (5–0)	Florida A&M	Adams State	IUP (9–0)	Weber State (7–2)	Delaware	15.
16.	Chattanooga (1) т	Alcorn A&M	Alcorn A&M	Troy State	Arkansas Tech	Texas–Arlington (4–3)	Florida A&M	Troy State (8–1)	Arkansas State (7–2–1)	Weber State	16.
17.	Eastern Michigan т	Fairmont State	West Chester	Montana State	Appalachian State (5–0) т	Ashland т	East Texas State	Gustavus Adolphus	North Carolina A&T	Western Kentucky (8–2–1)	17.
18.	Louisiana Tech (1)	West Chester т	Northern Iowa	Colorado State (Greeley) т	Adams State т	Adams State т	Kings Point (7–0)	Eastern Michigan т	Kings Point (7–1) т	Fresno State	18.
19.	Whitewater (Note: In the actual printed polls, Whitewater State was listed as Whitewater)	Western Kentucky т	C.W. Post	Willamette т	St. Norbert (Note: In the actual printed polls, St. Norbert was listed as St. Norbert’s)	Arkansas Tech т	Alcorn State	Central Missouri State (7–0–1) т	Florida A&M т	Kings Point т	19.
20.	Alcorn A&M	Weber State	Eastern Washington т	Appalachian State т	Texas–Arlington (3–3) т	Kings Point т	Humboldt State	Kings Point (7–1) т	Delaware	Florida A&M т	20.
21.			Willamette т		Gustavus Adolphus т	East Texas State (4–1) т				North Carolina A&T т	21.
22.						Arkansas State College т					22.
	Week 1 Sept 25	Week 2 Oct 2	Week 3 Oct 9	Week 4 Oct 16	Week 5 Oct 23	Week 6 Oct 30	Week 7 Nov 6	Week 8 Nov 13	Week 9 Nov 20	Week 10 Nov 27	
		Dropped: 10 Southwest Texas State; 13 San Francisco State; 15 UMass; 17 Eastern Michigan; 19 Whitewater	Dropped: 10 Adams State; 12 Montana State; 14 Temple; 17 Fairmont State	Dropped: 4 Northern Michigan; 10 Louisiana Tech; 15 Lenoir–Rhyne; 17 West Chester; 20 Eastern Washington	Dropped: 12 C.W. Post; 13 Alcorn A&M; 15 Northern Iowa; 17 Montana State; 18 Colorado State (Greeley)	Dropped: 17 Appalachian State; 19 St. Norbert; 20 Gustavus Adolphus	Dropped: 14 Northern Michigan; 16 Texas–Arlington; 17 Ashland; 20 Arkansas State College	Dropped: 9 Arkansas State; 14 Arkansas Tech; 16 Florida A&M; 17 East Texas State; 19 Alcorn State	Dropped: 17 Gustavus Adolphus; 18 Eastern Michigan; 19 Central Missouri State	None	

== HBCU rankings ==
The New Pittsburgh Courier, a leading African American newspaper, ranked the top 1968 teams from historically black colleges and universities in an era when college football was often racially segregated.

The rankings were published on December 7:

- 1. North Carolina A&T (8–1)
- 2. Morgan State (8–1)
- 3. Alcorn State (9–1)
- 4. Alabama State (8–1–1)
- 5. Lincoln (MO) (8–1)
- 6. Elizabeth City State (8–1)
- 7. Florida A&M (7–1)
- 8. West Virginia State (8–1)
- 9. Grambling (8–2)
- 10. Tuskegee (8–2)
- 11. South Carolina State (7–2)
- 12. Tennessee State (6–2–1)
- 13. North Carolina College (6–2)
- 14. Bishop (6–2)
- 15. Lane (6–2)
- 16. Fort Valley State (6–2)
- 17. Maryland State (5–2–1)
- 18. Virginia State (5–2–1)
- 19. Texas Southern (6–4)
- 20. Hampton (4–3–2)
- 21. Johnson C. Smith (5–4)
- 22. Alabama A&M (5–4)
