= 1964 Arlington State Rebels football team =

American college football season

1964 Arlington State Rebels football
- Conference: Southland Conference
- Record: 3–6–1 (0–3–1 Southland)
- Head coach: Chena Gilstrap (12th season)
- Home stadium: Memorial Stadium

1964 Southland Conference football standings
	Conf.					Overall
Team	W		L		T	W		L		T
Lamar Tech $	3	–	0	–	1	6	–	3	–	1
Arkansas State	2	–	0	–	2	7	–	0	–	2
Trinity (TX)	2	–	2	–	0	3	–	7	–	0
Abilene Christian	1	–	3	–	0	5	–	5	–	0
Arlington State	0	–	3	–	1	3	–	6	–	1
$ – Conference champion

The 1964 Arlington State Rebels football team was an American football team that represented Arlington State College (now known as the University of Texas at Arlington) in the Southland Conference during the 1964 NCAA College Division football season. In their twelfth year under head coach Chena Gilstrap, the team compiled a 3–6–1 record.

== Schedule ==
Date	Opponent	Site	Result	Attendance	Source
September 19	at New Mexico State*	Memorial Stadium; Las Cruces, NM	L 0–3	12,000	
September 26	at Arizona State–Flagstaff*	Lumberjack Stadium; Flagstaff, AZ	W 10–9	4,000–4,200	
October 3	at SMU*	Cotton Bowl; Dallas, TX	L 0–14	20,000	
October 10	Arkansas State	Memorial Stadium; Arlington, TX	T 7–7	6,000–6,500	
October 17	at Louisiana Tech*	Tech Stadium; Ruston, LA	L 7–19	7,500	
October 24	McMurry*	Memorial Stadium; Arlington, TX	W 17–7	6,000	
October 31	at Lamar Tech	Cardinal Stadium; Beaumont, TX	L 7–17	11,021	
November 7	at Abilene Christian	Shotwell Stadium; Abilene, TX	L 14–37	7,000–10,000	
November 14	Trinity (TX)	Memorial Stadium; Arlington, TX	L 7–23	7,000	
November 21	West Texas State*	Memorial Stadium; Arlington, TX	W 20–16	2,000	
*Non-conference game
