= 1964 Arkansas State Indians football team =

American college football season

1964 Arkansas State Indians football
- Conference: Southland Conference

Ranking
- Coaches: No. 15
- Record: 7–0–2 (2–0–2 Southland)
- Head coach: Bennie Ellender (2nd season)
- Home stadium: Kays Stadium

1964 Southland Conference football standings
	Conf.					Overall
Team	W		L		T	W		L		T
Lamar Tech $	3	–	0	–	1	6	–	3	–	1
Arkansas State	2	–	0	–	2	7	–	0	–	2
Trinity (TX)	2	–	2	–	0	3	–	7	–	0
Abilene Christian	1	–	3	–	0	5	–	5	–	0
Arlington State	0	–	3	–	1	3	–	6	–	1
$ – Conference champion

The 1964 Arkansas State Indians football team represented Arkansas State College—now known as Arkansas State University—as an independent during the 1964 NCAA College Division football season. Led by second-year head coach Bennie Ellender, the Indians compiled an overall record of 7–0–2 with a mark of 2–0–2 in conference play, finishing second out of five teams in the Southland.

== Schedule ==
Date	Opponent	Rank	Site	Result	Attendance	Source
September 19	Tennessee Tech*		Kays Stadium; Jonesboro, AR	W 27–0	5,000	
September 26	at Florence State*		Braly Municipal Stadium; Florence, AL	W 10–7	3,000	
October 3	at Stephen F. Austin*		Memorial Stadium; Nacogdoches, TX	W 17–6	4,765	
October 10	at Arlington State		Memorial Stadium; Arlington, TX	T 7–7	6,000–6,500	
October 17	Trinity (TX)		Kays Stadium; Jonesboro, AR	W 35–13	5,234–5,875	
October 24	at Abilene Christian		Shotwell Stadium; Abilene, TX	W 21–7	3,375–3,625	
October 31	at Murray State*		Cutchin Stadium; Murray, KY	W 17–8	4,700	
November 7	Delta State*	No. 9	Kays Stadium; Jonesboro, AR	W 7–6	4,879	
November 14	Lamar Tech	No. 10	Kays Stadium; Jonesboro, AR	T 7–7	4,400	
*Non-conference game; Rankings from AP Poll released prior to the game
