= Vernon Glass =

American football player and coach (1928–2005)

Biographical details
- Born: October 14, 1928; Bloomburg, Texas, U.S.
- Died: December 3, 2005 (aged 77); Cuero, Texas, U.S.

Playing career
- 1948–1950: Rice
- Position: Quarterback

Coaching career (HC unless noted)
- 1956–1958: Del Mar (assistant)
- 1959: Del Mar
- 1960–1962: Baylor (assistant)
- 1963–1975: Lamar Tech / Lamar

Head coaching record
- Overall: 63–68–1 (college); 8–1–1 (junior college)
- Bowls: 0–1 (college); 0–1 (junior college)

Accomplishments and honors

Championships
- 1 Pioneer (1959); 4 Southland (1964–1966, 1971)

Vernon Glass (October 14, 1928 – December 3, 2005) was an American football coach. He served as head football coach at Lamar University from 1963 to 1975, compiling a record of 63–68–1.

Glass was a standout quarterback in Corpus Christi, Texas, and played in the 1947 Oil Bowl alongside Hayden Fry. He chose to attend Rice University, where he was a three-year letter-winner in both football and baseball. He captained the 1950 football team and the 1951 baseball team. He keyed Rice's drive to the 1949 Southwest Conference crown, including a 17–15 win over Texas in a showdown in Austin, Texas. Rice also won the 1950 Cotton Bowl Classic against North Carolina, which was led by Charlie Justice, also known as "Choo Choo".

Before joining the coaching profession, Glass spent two years in the United States Air Force, leading Carswell Air Force Base to the 1952 national service championship. He also played one year of professional baseball at Corpus Christi in 1953. Glass started his coaching career at Del Mar College, a junior college in Corpus Christi. After three seasons as assistant, he spent one year as head coach, guiding the Vikings to a 8–0–1 record before falling in the Junior Rose Bowl. Glass then left Del Mar to serve as an assistant coach under John Bridgers at Baylor University from 1960 to 1962.

== Lamar ==
In 1963, he became head coach at Lamar State College of Technology—now known as Lamar University—in Beaumont, Texas, guiding the Cardinals to 6–3–1 record and the Southland Conference (SLC) title in just his second year. Lamar was invited to the Pecan Bowl, where they lost 19–17 to the State College of Iowa. Glass also helped Lamar win SLC titles in 1965 and 1966, which gave the Cardinals three straight conference championships. The other SLC title came in 1971. His best season at Lamar was in 1974 when the Cardinals posted an 8–2 record. He was named SLC Coach of the Year in 1970 and 1974. In addition, Glass was named NCAA College Division Coach of the Year in 1964 and 1965 and was recognized by the Texas Sports Writers Association at Junior College Coach of the Year in 1959.

In September 2009, Bart Simmons, a Lamar University alumnus, donated $200,000 to create a football practice facility, the "Coach Vernon Glass Field of Champions".

== Head coaching record ==
=== College ===
Year	Team	Overall	Conference	Standing	Bowl/playoffs
Lamar Cardinals (NCAA College Division independent) (1963)
1963	Lamar Tech	5–4			
Lamar Cardinals (Southland Conference) (1964–1975)
1964	Lamar Tech	6–3–1	3–0–1	1st	L Pecan Bowl
1965	Lamar Tech	6–4	3–1	1st	
1966	Lamar Tech	6–4	3–1	T–1st	
1967	Lamar Tech	7–3	3–1	2nd	
1968	Lamar Tech	0–10	0–4	5th	
1969	Lamar Tech	3–7	0–4	5th	
1970	Lamar Tech	3–7	1–3	4th	
1971	Lamar	5–6	4–1	T–1st	
1972	Lamar	8–3	3–2	T–3rd	
1973	Lamar	5–5	3–2	T–2nd	
1974	Lamar	8–2	4–1	2nd	
1975	Lamar	1–10	0–5	6th	
Lamar Tech / Lamar:		63–68–1	27–25–1		
Total:		63–68–1			
National championship Conference title Conference division title or championship game berth

=== Junior college ===
Year	Team	Overall	Conference	Standing	Bowl/playoffs
Del Mar Vikings (Pioneer Conference) (1959)
1959	Del Mar	8–1–1	5–0	1st	L Junior Rose Bowl
Del Mar:		8–1–1	5–0		
Total:		8–1–1			
National championship Conference title Conference division title or championship game berth
