= List of Southland Conference football champions =

Since 1964, the Southland Conference has awarded a championship in football. From 1964 to 1972, the conference was part of the NCAA College Division. It was classified as Division II for 1973 and 1974 before going back to Division I in 1975. It has been part of what is referred to as the FCS since 1982. Due to the scheduling structure at the time in 2018 (in which 10 of its 11 teams played nine games while one team played eight), a co-champion was declared when Nicholls (7-2) and Incarnate Word (6-2) finished with the same amount of conference losses.

== List of champions ==
Year	Champion(s)
1964	Lamar Tech
1965	Lamar
1966	Arlington State
1967	UT Arlington
1968	Arkansas State
1969	Arkansas State
1970	Arkansas State
1971	Louisiana Tech
1972	Louisiana Tech
1973	Louisiana Tech
1974	Louisiana Tech
1975	Arkansas State
1976	McNeese State, Southwestern Louisiana
1977	Louisiana Tech
1978	Louisiana Tech
1979	McNeese State
1980	McNeese State
1981	Texas-Alington
1982	Louisiana Tech
1983	North Texas, Northeast Louisiana
1984	Louisiana Tech
1985	Arkansas State
1986	Arkansas State
1987	Northeast Louisiana
1988	Northwestern State
1989	Stephen F. Austin
1990	Northeast Louisiana
1991	McNeese State
1992	Northeast Louisiana
1993	McNeese State
1994	North Texas
1995	McNeese State
1996	Troy State
1997	Northwestern Louisiana State, McNeese State
1998	Northwestern Louisiana State
1999	Stephen F. Austin, Troy State
2000	Troy State
2001	Sam Houston State, McNeese State (5-1)
2002	McNeese State (6-0)
2003	McNeese State (5-0)
2004	Sam Houston State, Northwestern Louisiana State (4-1)
2005	Nicholls State, Texas State (5-1)
2006	McNeese State (5-1)
2007	McNeese State (7-0)
2008	Texas State (5-2) [Central Arkansas, while 6-1, was not yet eligible]
2009	Stephen F. Austin, McNeese State (6-1)
2010	Stephen F. Austin (7-1)
2011	Sam Houston State (7-0)
2012	Central Arkansas, Sam Houston State (6-1)
2013	Southeastern Louisiana
2014	Sam Houston State, Southeastern Louisiana (7-1)
2015	McNeese State
2016	Sam Houston State
2017	Central Arkansas
2018	Nicholls (7-2), Incarnate Word (6-2)
2019	Nicholls, Central Arkansas (7-2)
2020	Sam Houston State
2021	Incarnate Word
2022	Southeastern Louisiana, Incarnate Word (5-1)
2023	Nicholls
2024	Incarnate Word
2025	
