= 1968 Arkansas State Indians football team =

American college football season

1968 Arkansas State Indians football

Southland champion

Pecan Bowl, L 14–23 vs. North Dakota State
- Conference: Southland Conference

Ranking
- Coaches: No. 14
- AP: No. 15
- Record: 7–3–1 (3–0–1 Southland)
- Head coach: Bennie Ellender (6th season)
- Home stadium: Kays Stadium; War Memorial Stadium

1968 Southland Conference football standings
	Conf.					Overall
Team	W		L		T	W		L		T
No. 15 Arkansas State $	3	–	0	–	1	7	–	3	–	1
UT Arlington	3	–	1	–	0	6	–	4	–	0
Trinity (TX)	2	–	2	–	0	5	–	4	–	0
Abilene Christian	1	–	2	–	1	4	–	5	–	1
Lamar Tech	0	–	4	–	0	0	–	10	–	0
$ – Conference champion; Rankings from AP small college poll

The 1968 Arkansas State Indians football team represented Arkansas State University as a member of the Southland Conference during the 1968 NCAA College Division football season. Led by sixth-year head coach Bennie Ellender, the Arkansas State compiled an overall record of 7–3–1 with a mark of 3–0–1 in conference play, winning the Southland title. The Indians were invited to the Pecan Bowl, where they were defeated by North Dakota State.

== Schedule ==
Date	Opponent	Rank	Site	Result	Attendance	Source
September 14	at Western Michigan*		Waldo Stadium; Kalamazoo, MI	L 0–20	15,500	
September 21	at Drake*		Drake Stadium; Des Moines, IA	W 46–14	9,000	
September 28	No. T–18 Eastern Michigan*		Kays Stadium; Jonesboro, AR	W 26–7	7,800	
October 5	Tennessee Tech*	No. 15	Kays Stadium; Jonesboro, AR	W 15–12	2,760	
October 12	Southeastern Louisiana*	No. 11	Kays Stadium; Jonesboro, AR	W 17–7	8,112	
October 19	No. 16 Trinity (TX)	No. 10	War Memorial Stadium; Little Rock, AR	W 31–14	18,500	
October 26	at Abilene Christian	No. 8	Shotwell Stadium; Abilene, TX	T 17–17	5,500–8,800	
November 2	Lamar Tech^{†}	No. 13	Kays Stadium; Jonesboro, AR	W 48–17	9,556	
November 9	at Southwestern Louisiana*	No. 10	McNaspy Stadium; Lafayette, LA	L 9–20	11,600	
November 16	at No. 17 UT Arlington		Memorial Stadium; Arlington, TX	W 22–21	9,750	
December 14	vs. No. 1 North Dakota State	No. 15	Memorial Stadium; Arlington, TX (Pecan Bowl)	L 14–23	7,200	
*Non-conference game; ^{†}Homecoming; Rankings from AP Poll released prior to the game
