= 1968 East Texas State Lions football team =

American college football season

1968 East Texas State Lions football
- Conference: Lone Star Conference
- Record: 7–2–1 (5–1–1 LSC)
- Head coach: Ernest Hawkins (5th season)
- Home stadium: Memorial Stadium

1968 Lone Star Conference football standings
	Conf.					Overall
Team	W		L		T	W		L		T
No. 2/6 Texas A&I $^	6	–	1	–	0	10	–	2	–	0
East Texas State	5	–	1	–	1	7	–	2	–	1
McMurry	5	–	2	–	0	8	–	2	–	0
Sam Houston State	3	–	3	–	1	5	–	4	–	1
Southwest Texas State	3	–	4	–	0	5	–	5	–	0
Sul Ross	2	–	4	–	1	5	–	4	–	1
Howard Payne	1	–	5	–	1	2	–	7	–	1
Stephen F. Austin	1	–	6	–	0	3	–	7	–	0
Tarleton State *	0	–	0	–	0	2	–	7	–	0
Angelo State *	0	–	0	–	0	2	–	9	–	0
$ – Conference champion; ^ – NAIA playoff participant * – did not complete for conference title; Rankings from NAIA poll and AP small college poll

The 1968 East Texas State Lions football team represented East Texas State University in the 1968 NAIA football season. They were led by head coach Ernest Hawkins, who was in his fifth season at East Texas State. The Lions played their home games at Memorial Stadium and were members of the Lone Star Conference. The Lions finished second in the conference standings the season with a 7–2–1 record overall and a 5–1–1 record in LSC play. The season highlight was a 35–27 win over the NAIA's No. 1 team, Texas A&I, on October 19.

== Schedule ==
Date	Time	Opponent	Site	Result	Attendance	Source
September 21		at Abilene Christian*	Shotwell Stadium; Abilene, TX	W 29–22	8,500–9,000	
September 28		Southwest Missouri State*	Memorial Stadium; Commerce, TX	W 52–0		
October 5		at No. 12 UT Arlington*	Memorial Stadium; Arlington, TX	L 30–41	10,500	
October 12		McMurry	Memorial Stadium; Commerce, TX	W 20–0		
October 19	7:30 p.m.	No. 5 Texas A&I	Memorial Stadium; Commerce, TX	W 35–27		
October 26		at Sul Ross	Jackson Field; Alpine, TX	T 28–28		
November 2		Howard Payne	Memorial Stadium; Commerce, TX	W 24–14		
November 9		at Sam Houston State	Pritchett Field; Huntsville, TX	L 21–24	3,500	
November 16		Southwest Texas State	Memorial Stadium; Commerce, TX	W 51–14	5,000	
November 23		at Stephen F. Austin	Memorial Stadium; Nacogdoches, TX	W 28–20		
*Non-conference game; Rankings from AP Poll released prior to the game; All times are in Central time

== Postseason awards ==
=== All-Americans ===
- Chad Brown, First Team offensive tackle
- Arthur James, First Team tailback
- Tom Black, Honorable Mention tight end
- Bruce Butler, Honorable Mention linebacker

=== All-Lone Star Conference ===
==== LSC First Team ====
- Bill Allison, fullback
- Arthur James, tailback

==== LSC Second Team ====
- Chad Brown, offensive rackle
- Tom Black, receiver
- Bruce Butler, linebacker
- Rich Houston, receiver
- Don Hynds, defensive end

==== LSC Honorable Mention ====
- Jack Herrington, offensive tackle
- Jay Johnson, defensive tackle
- Grady Ivy, linebacker
- Ben Kirkland, quarterback
- Ralph Weaver, linebacker
