= 1969 Abilene Christian Wildcats football team =

American college football season

1969 Abilene Christian Wildcats football
- Conference: Southland Conference
- Record: 8–2 (2–2 Southland)
- Head coach: Wally Bullington (2nd season)
- Home stadium: Shotwell Stadium

1969 Southland Conference football standings
	Conf.					Overall
Team	W		L		T	W		L		T
No. 7 Arkansas State $	4	–	0	–	0	8	–	1	–	1
Abilene Christian	2	–	2	–	0	8	–	2	–	0
UT Arlington	2	–	2	–	0	5	–	5	–	0
Trinity (TX)	2	–	2	–	0	4	–	6	–	0
Lamar Tech	0	–	4	–	0	3	–	7	–	0
$ – Conference champion; Rankings from AP small college poll

The 1969 Abilene Christian Wildcats football team was an American football team that represented Abilene Christian College (now known as Abilene Christian University) in the Southland Conference during the 1969 NCAA College Division football season. In their second year under head coach Wally Bullington, the team compiled a 8–2 record.

== Schedule ==
Date	Opponent	Rank	Site	Result	Attendance	Source
September 13	at Arkansas Tech*		Thone Stadium; Russellville, AR	W 35–17	9,500	
September 20	at East Texas State*		Memorial Stadium; Commerce, TX	W 28–23	8,000	
September 27	at Howard Payne*		Lion Stadium; Brownwood, TX	W 36–27	6,500	
October 4	vs. McMurry*		Shotwell Stadium; Abilene, TX	W 30–2	12,000	
October 19	Lamar Tech	No. 12	Shotwell Stadium; Abilene, TX	W 22–9	7,500–8,000	
October 25	at Arkansas State	No. 10	Kays Stadium; Jonesboro, AR	L 22–34	8,500	
November 1	Eastern New Mexico*	No. 16	Shotwell Stadium; Abilene, TX	W 42–13	9,500	
November 8	at UT Arlington	No. 11	Memorial Stadium; Arlington, TX	W 28–24	9,800	
November 15	Trinity (TX)	No. 13	Shotwell Stadium; Abilene, TX	L 13–16	3,000–4,000	
November 22	Angelo State*		Shotwell Stadium; Abilene, TX	W 51–19	4,000	
*Non-conference game; Rankings from AP Poll released prior to the game
