= 1968 UT Arlington Rebels football team =

American college football season

1968 UT Arlington Rebels football
- Conference: Southland Conference
- Record: 6–4 (3–1 Southland)
- Head coach: Burley Bearden (3rd season)
- Home stadium: Memorial Stadium

1968 Southland Conference football standings
	Conf.					Overall
Team	W		L		T	W		L		T
No. 15 Arkansas State $	3	–	0	–	1	7	–	3	–	1
UT Arlington	3	–	1	–	0	6	–	4	–	0
Trinity (TX)	2	–	2	–	0	5	–	4	–	0
Abilene Christian	1	–	2	–	1	4	–	5	–	1
Lamar Tech	0	–	4	–	0	0	–	10	–	0
$ – Conference champion; Rankings from AP small college poll

The 1968 UT Arlington Rebels football team was an American football team that represented the University of Texas at Arlington in the Southland Conference during the 1968 NCAA College Division football season. In their third year under head coach Burley Bearden, the team compiled a 6–4 record.

== Schedule ==
Date	Opponent	Rank	Site	Result	Attendance	Source
September 14	at San Diego State*		San Diego Stadium; San Diego, CA	L 18–23	35,227	
September 21	Northeast Louisiana State*		Memorial Stadium; Arlington, TX	W 24–14	9,500	
September 28	at New Mexico State*	No. 6	Memorial Stadium; Las Cruces, NM	L 20–21	15,338	
October 5	East Texas State*	No. 12	Memorial Stadium; Arlington, TX	W 41–30	10,500	
October 12	McNeese State*		Memorial Stadium; Arlington, TX	W 46–21	9,000	
October 19	at West Texas State*	No. 12	Buffalo Bowl; Canyon, TX	L 0–41	17,200	
October 26	Trinity (TX)	No. T–17	Memorial Stadium; Arlington, TX	W 27–14	7,200	
November 9	at Abilene Christian	No. T–18	Shotwell Stadium; Abilene, TX	W 30–20	9,000	
November 16	Arkansas State	No. 17	Memorial Stadium; Arlington, TX	L 21–22	9,750	
November 23	at Lamar Tech		Cardinal Stadium; Beaumont, TX	W 37–20	5,921–5,931	
*Non-conference game; Rankings from AP Poll released prior to the game
