= 1969 Lamar Tech Cardinals football team =

American college football season

1969 Lamar Tech Cardinals football
- Conference: Southland Conference
- Record: 3–7 (0–4 Southland)
- Head coach: Vernon Glass (7th season)
- Home stadium: Cardinal Stadium

1969 Southland Conference football standings
	Conf.					Overall
Team	W		L		T	W		L		T
No. 7 Arkansas State $	4	–	0	–	0	8	–	1	–	1
Abilene Christian	2	–	2	–	0	8	–	2	–	0
UT Arlington	2	–	2	–	0	5	–	5	–	0
Trinity (TX)	2	–	2	–	0	4	–	6	–	0
Lamar Tech	0	–	4	–	0	3	–	7	–	0
$ – Conference champion; Rankings from AP small college poll

The 1969 Lamar Tech Cardinals football team represented Lamar State College of Technology—now known as Lamar University—as a member of the Southland Conference during the 1969 NCAA College Division football season. Led by seventh-year head coach Vernon Glass, the Cardinals compiled an overall record of 3–7 with a mark of 0–4 in conference play, placing last out of five teams in the Southland. Lamar Tech played home games at Cardinal Stadium in Beaumont, Texas.

== Schedule ==
Date	Opponent	Site	Result	Attendance	Source
September 20	at McNeese State*	Cowboy Stadium; Lake Charles, LA (Battle of the Border)	W 13–7	12,300–12,600	
September 27	at Southeastern Louisiana*	Strawberry Stadium; Hammond, LA	L 19–21	6,500	
October 4	New Mexico State*	Cardinal Stadium; Beaumont, TX	W 9–7	13,747	
October 11	Southern Illinois*	Cardinal Stadium; Beaumont, TX	W 20–16	11,651	
October 19	at No. 12 Abilene Christian	Shotwell Stadium; Abilene, TX	L 9–22	7,500–8,000	
October 25	at Southwestern Louisiana*	Cardinal Stadium; Beaumont, TX (rivalry)	L 16–24	11,175	
November 1	at No. 11 Arkansas State	Kays Stadium; Jonesboro, AR	L 20–0	11,254	
November 8	Trinity (TX)	Cardinal Stadium; Beaumont, TX	L 0–22	8,133	
November 15	at No. 7 Louisiana Tech*	Louisiana Tech Stadium; Ruston, LA	L 40–77	10,000	
November 22	at UT Arlington	Memorial Stadium; Arlington, TX	L 16–53	6,500	
*Non-conference game; Rankings from AP Poll released prior to the game
