= 1966 Arkansas State Indians football team =

American college football season

1966 Arkansas State Indians football
- Conference: Southland Conference

Ranking
- Coaches: No. 11
- AP: No. 6
- Record: 7–2 (2–2 Southland)
- Head coach: Bennie Ellender (4th season)
- Home stadium: Kays Stadium

1966 Southland Conference football standings
	Conf.					Overall
Team	W		L		T	W		L		T
Arlington State +	3	–	1	–	0	6	–	4	–	0
Lamar Tech +	3	–	1	–	0	6	–	4	–	0
No. 6 Arkansas State	2	–	2	–	0	7	–	2	–	0
Trinity (TX)	2	–	2	–	0	5	–	4	–	0
Abilene Christian	0	–	4	–	0	4	–	6	–	0
+ – Conference co-champions; Rankings from AP small college poll

The 1966 Arkansas State Indians football team represented Arkansas State College—now known as Arkansas State University—as a member of the Southland Conference during the 1966 NCAA College Division football season. Led by fourth-year head coach Bennie Ellender, the Indians compiled an overall record of 7–2 with a mark of 2–2 in conference play, tying for third place in the Southland.

== Schedule ==
Date	Opponent	Rank	Site	Result	Attendance	Source
September 17	Tennessee Tech*		Kays Stadium; Jonesboro, AR	W 49–13	6,000	
September 24	at Florence State*		Braly Municipal Stadium; Florence, AL	W 27–7	3,000	
October 8	Louisiana Tech*		Kays Stadium; Jonesboro, AR	W 26–13	7,200	
October 15	at Murray State*	No. 9	Cutchin Stadium; Murray, KY	W 44–0	2,500	
October 22	at Abilene Christian	No. 8	Shotwell Stadium; Abilene, TX	W 33–22	2,000–4,800	
October 29	Lamar Tech	No. 5	Kays Stadium; Jonesboro, AR	L 0–17	9,242	
November 5	at Southwestern Louisiana*	No. 6	McNaspy Stadium; Lafayette, LA	W 17–14	9,000	
November 12	at Arlington State	No. 7	Memorial Stadium; Arlington, TX	L 6–16	10,022	
November 19	Trinity (TX)		Kays Stadium; Jonesboro, AR	W 20–7	4,317–9,317	
*Non-conference game; Rankings from AP Poll released prior to the game
