= 1964 Abilene Christian Wildcats football team =

American college football season

1964 Abilene Christian Wildcats football
- Conference: Southland Conference
- Record: 5–5 (1–3 Southland)
- Head coach: Les Wheeler (3rd season)
- Home stadium: Shotwell Stadium

1964 Southland Conference football standings
	Conf.					Overall
Team	W		L		T	W		L		T
Lamar Tech $	3	–	0	–	1	6	–	3	–	1
Arkansas State	2	–	0	–	2	7	–	0	–	2
Trinity (TX)	2	–	2	–	0	3	–	7	–	0
Abilene Christian	1	–	3	–	0	5	–	5	–	0
Arlington State	0	–	3	–	1	3	–	6	–	1
$ – Conference champion

The 1964 Abilene Christian Wildcats football team was an American football team that represented Abilene Christian College (now known as Abilene Christian University) in the Southland Conference during the 1964 NCAA College Division football season. In their third year under head coach Les Wheeler, the team compiled a 5–5 record.

== Schedule ==
Date	Opponent	Site	Result	Attendance	Source
September 12	at Howard Payne*	Lions Stadium; Brownwood, TX	W 24–6	4,200	
September 19	East Texas State*	Shotwell Stadium; Abilene, TX	W 17–11	8,000–10,000	
September 26	at Lamar Tech	Cardinal Stadium; Beaumont, TX	L 3–14	14,381	
October 3	vs. McMurry*	Shotwell Stadium; Abilene, TX	W 22–15	6,500	
October 10	at Northwestern State*	Demon Stadium; Natchitoches, LA	W 36–26	7,000	
October 17	at Dayton*	Baujan Field; Dayton, OH	L 14–21	13,636–14,500	
October 24	Arkansas State	Shotwell Stadium; Abilene, TX	L 7–21	3,375–3,625	
October 31	at Trinity (TX)	Alamo Stadium; San Antonio, TX	L 7–26	1,890	
November 7	Arlington State^{†}	Shotwell Stadium; Abilene, TX	W 37–14	7,000–10,000	
November 14	at Drake*	Drake Stadium; Des Moines, IA	L 3–14	5,000	
*Non-conference game; ^{†}Homecoming
