= 1969 Trinity Tigers football team =

American college football season

1969 Trinity Tigers football
- Conference: Southland Conference
- Record: 4–6 (2–2 Southland)
- Head coach: Earl Gartman (3rd season)
- Home stadium: Alamo Stadium

1969 Southland Conference football standings
	Conf.					Overall
Team	W		L		T	W		L		T
No. 7 Arkansas State $	4	–	0	–	0	8	–	1	–	1
Abilene Christian	2	–	2	–	0	8	–	2	–	0
UT Arlington	2	–	2	–	0	5	–	5	–	0
Trinity (TX)	2	–	2	–	0	4	–	6	–	0
Lamar Tech	0	–	4	–	0	3	–	7	–	0
$ – Conference champion; Rankings from AP small college poll

The 1969 Trinity Tigers football team was an American football team that represented Trinity University in the Southland Conference during the 1969 NCAA College Division football season. In their third year under head coach Earl Gartman, the team compiled a 4–6 record.

== Schedule ==
Date	Opponent	Site	Result	Attendance	Source
September 20	Texas A&I*	Alamo Stadium; San Antonio, TX	L 6–21	5,073	
September 27	at Southwest Texas State*	Evans Field; San Marcos, TX	W 10–9	8,100	
October 4	Davidson*	Alamo Stadium; San Antonio, TX	L 16–17	1,756	
October 11	at Southeastern Louisiana*	Strawberry Stadium; Hammond, LA	L 14–43	6,000–6,500	
October 25	UT Arlington	Alamo Stadium; San Antonio, TX	L 7–34	1,646–1,684	
November 1	Texas Lutheran*^{†}	Alamo Stadium; San Antonio, TX	L 14–23	2,304–2,306	
November 8	at Lamar Tech	Cardinal Stadium; Beaumont, TX	W 22–0	8,133	
November 15	at No. 13 Abilene Christian	Shotwell Stadium; Abilene, TX	W 16–13	3,000–4,000	
November 22	No. 9 Arkansas State	Alamo Stadium; San Antonio, TX	L 17–27	2,107–2,143	
November 29	at UNAM*	Estadio Olímpico Universitario; Mexico City, Mexico	W 49–6	7,000	
*Non-conference game; ^{†}Homecoming; Rankings from AP Poll released prior to the game
