= 1966 Abilene Christian Wildcats football team =

American college football season

1966 Abilene Christian Wildcats football
- Conference: Southland Conference
- Record: 4–6 (0–4 Southland)
- Head coach: Les Wheeler (5th season)
- Home stadium: Shotwell Stadium

1966 Southland Conference football standings
	Conf.					Overall
Team	W		L		T	W		L		T
Arlington State +	3	–	1	–	0	6	–	4	–	0
Lamar Tech +	3	–	1	–	0	6	–	4	–	0
No. 6 Arkansas State	2	–	2	–	0	7	–	2	–	0
Trinity (TX)	2	–	2	–	0	5	–	4	–	0
Abilene Christian	0	–	4	–	0	4	–	6	–	0
+ – Conference co-champions; Rankings from AP small college poll

The 1966 Abilene Christian Wildcats football team was an American football team that represented Abilene Christian College (now known as Abilene Christian University) in the Southland Conference during the 1966 NCAA College Division football season. In their fifth year under head coach Les Wheeler, the team compiled a 4–6 record.

== Schedule ==
Date	Opponent	Site	Result	Attendance	Source
September 17	East Texas State*	Shotwell Stadium; Abilene, TX	W 7–0	6,500	
September 24	Howard Payne*	Shotwell Stadium; Abilene, TX	W 17–9	4,000	
October 1	vs. McMurry*	Shotwell Stadium; Abilene, TX	W 28–7	7,500–9,000	
October 8	at Chattanooga*	Chamberlain Field; Chattanooga, TN	L 8–45	7,500	
October 15	at Lamar Tech	Cardinal Stadium; Beaumont, TX	L 16–42	12,100–12,832	
October 22	No. 8 Arkansas State	Shotwell Stadium; Abilene, TX	L 22–33	2,000–4,800	
October 29	at Cal State Los Angeles*	Rose Bowl; Pasadena, CA	L 7–23	4,450–4,458	
November 5	Arlington State	Shotwell Stadium; Abilene, TX	L 0–23	8,000–9,200	
November 12	at Trinity (TX)	Alamo Stadium; San Antonio, TX	L 27–37	2,250–2,482	
November 19	Angelo State*	Shotwell Stadium; Abilene, TX	W 28–18	2,000	
*Non-conference game; Rankings from AP Poll released prior to the game
