= 1968 Southwest Texas State Bobcats football team =

American college football season

1968 Southwest Texas State Bobcats football
- Conference: Lone Star Conference
- Record: 5–5 (3–4 LSC)
- Head coach: Bill Miller (4th season)
- Home stadium: Evans Field

1968 Lone Star Conference football standings
	Conf.					Overall
Team	W		L		T	W		L		T
No. 2/6 Texas A&I $^	6	–	1	–	0	10	–	2	–	0
East Texas State	5	–	1	–	1	7	–	2	–	1
McMurry	5	–	2	–	0	8	–	2	–	0
Sam Houston State	3	–	3	–	1	5	–	4	–	1
Southwest Texas State	3	–	4	–	0	5	–	5	–	0
Sul Ross	2	–	4	–	1	5	–	4	–	1
Howard Payne	1	–	5	–	1	2	–	7	–	1
Stephen F. Austin	1	–	6	–	0	3	–	7	–	0
Tarleton State *	0	–	0	–	0	2	–	7	–	0
Angelo State *	0	–	0	–	0	2	–	9	–	0
$ – Conference champion; ^ – NAIA playoff participant * – did not complete for conference title; Rankings from NAIA poll and AP small college poll

The 1968 Southwest Texas State Bobcats football team was an American football team that represented Southwest Texas State College (now known as Texas State University) during the 1968 NAIA football season as a member of the Lone Star Conference (LSC). In their fourth year under head coach Bill Miller, the team compiled an overall record of 5–5 with a mark of 3–4 in conference play.

== Schedule ==
Date	Time	Opponent	Site	Result	Attendance	Source
September 21		Texas Lutheran*	Evans Field; San Marcos, TX	W 40–0	8,500	
September 28		at Trinity (TX)*	Alamo Stadium; San Antonio, TX	L 12–13	5,877	
October 5		at Sul Ross	Jackson Field; Alpine, TX	L 21–36		
October 12		Angelo State*	Evans Field; San Marcos, TX	W 43–7		
October 19		Howard Payne	Evans Field; San Marcos, TX	W 27–7		
October 26		at Sam Houston State	Pritchett Field; Huntsville, TX (rivalry)	W 31–15		
November 2		at McMurry	Shotwell Stadium; Abilene, TX	L 17–21		
November 9		Stephen F. Austin	Evans Field; San Marcos, TX	W 43–6		
November 16		at East Texas State	Memorial Stadium; Commerce, TX	L 14–51	5,000	
November 23	7:30 p.m.	No. 6 Texas A&I	Evans Field; San Marcos, TX	L 0–39	13,500	
*Non-conference game; Rankings from AP Poll released prior to the game; All times are in Central time
