= 1970 UT Arlington Rebels football team =

American college football season

1970 UT Arlington Rebels football
- Conference: Southland Conference
- Record: 0–10 (0–4 Southland)
- Head coach: Burley Bearden (5th season)
- Home stadium: Turnpike Stadium

1970 Southland Conference football standings
	Conf.					Overall
Team	W		L		T	W		L		T
No. 1 Arkansas State $	4	–	0	–	0	11	–	0	–	0
No. 14 Abilene Christian	3	–	1	–	0	9	–	2	–	0
Trinity (TX)	2	–	2	–	0	5	–	6	–	0
Lamar Tech	1	–	3	–	0	3	–	7	–	0
UT Arlington	0	–	4	–	0	0	–	10	–	0
$ – Conference champion; Rankings from AP small college poll

The 1970 UT Arlington Rebels football team was an American football team that represented the University of Texas at Arlington in the Southland Conference during the 1970 NCAA College Division football season. In their fifth year under head coach Burley Bearden, the team compiled an 0–10 record. After the conclusion of the season on December 9, head coach Bearden resigned to take a position as an assistant professor within UTA's physical education department. The 1970 season also marked the final UTA competed as the Rebels before transitioning to the Mavericks for their 1971 season.

== Schedule ==
Date	Time	Opponent	Site	Result	Attendance	Source
September 12		at TCU*	Amon G. Carter Stadium; Fort Worth, TX	L 7–31	25,427	
October 19		at New Mexico State*	Memorial Stadium; Las Cruces, NM	L 7–35	10,012	
September 26		at Southern Miss*	Faulkner Field; Hattiesburg, MS	L 20–26	9,074–9,500	
October 3		Texas Lutheran*	Turnpike Stadium; Arlington, TX	L 6–17	6,500	
October 17		No. T–13 Southwestern Louisiana*	Turnpike Stadium; Arlington, TX	L 7–28	4,000	
October 24		Trinity (TX)^{†}	Turnpike Stadium; Arlington, TX	L 0–24	4,000–7,000	
October 31	8:00 p.m.	West Texas State*	Turnpike Stadium; Arlington, TX	L 8–33	4,200	
November 7		at No. 16 Abilene Christian	Shotwell Stadium; Abilene, TX	L 7–21	13,000	
November 14		No. 1 Arkansas State	Arlington Stadium; Arlington, TX	L 7–27	1,200	
November 21		at Lamar Tech	Cardinal Stadium; Beaumont, TX	L 0–24	9,821	
*Non-conference game; ^{†}Homecoming; Rankings from AP Poll released prior to the game; All times are in Central time
