= 1966 Arlington State Rebels football team =

American college football season

1966 Arlington State Rebels football

Southland co-champion
- Conference: Southland Conference
- Record: 6–4 (3–1 Southland)
- Head coach: Burley Bearden (1st season)
- Home stadium: Memorial Stadium

1966 Southland Conference football standings
	Conf.					Overall
Team	W		L		T	W		L		T
Arlington State +	3	–	1	–	0	6	–	4	–	0
Lamar Tech +	3	–	1	–	0	6	–	4	–	0
No. 6 Arkansas State	2	–	2	–	0	7	–	2	–	0
Trinity (TX)	2	–	2	–	0	5	–	4	–	0
Abilene Christian	0	–	4	–	0	4	–	6	–	0
+ – Conference co-champions; Rankings from AP small college poll

The 1966 Arlington State Rebels football team was an American football team that represented Arlington State College (now known as the University of Texas at Arlington) in the Southland Conference during the 1966 NCAA College Division football season. In their first year under head coach Burley Bearden, the team compiled a 6–4 record and were Southland Conference co-champions.

== Schedule ==
Date	Opponent	Site	Result	Attendance	Source
September 17	at West Texas State*	Buffalo Bowl; Canyon, TX	L 6–38	13,000–15,000	
September 24	at New Mexico State*	Memorial Stadium; Las Cruces, NM	L 10–23	12,000	
October 1	East Texas State*	Memorial Stadium; Arlington, TX	W 27–10	10,000	
October 8	McNeese State*	Memorial Stadium; Arlington, TX	W 20–0	8,000	
October 15	at Texas Western*	Sun Bowl; El Paso, TX	L 21–68	25,624	
October 22	Trinity (TX)	Memorial Stadium; Arlington, TX	W 20–7	7,000	
October 29	Tarleton State*	Memorial Stadium; Arlington, TX	W 46–15	8,500	
November 5	at Abilene Christian	Shotwell Stadium; Abilene, TX	W 23–0	8,000–9,000	
November 12	No. 7 Arkansas State	Memorial Stadium; Arlington, TX	W 16–6	10,022	
November 19	at Lamar Tech	Cardinal Stadium; Beaumont, TX	L 7–27	11,417	
*Non-conference game; Rankings from AP Poll released prior to the game
