= 1969 UT Arlington Rebels football team =

American college football season

1969 UT Arlington Rebels football
- Conference: Southland Conference
- Record: 5–5 (2–2 Southland)
- Head coach: Burley Bearden (4th season)
- Home stadium: Memorial Stadium

1969 Southland Conference football standings
	Conf.					Overall
Team	W		L		T	W		L		T
No. 7 Arkansas State $	4	–	0	–	0	8	–	1	–	1
Abilene Christian	2	–	2	–	0	8	–	2	–	0
UT Arlington	2	–	2	–	0	5	–	5	–	0
Trinity (TX)	2	–	2	–	0	4	–	6	–	0
Lamar Tech	0	–	4	–	0	3	–	7	–	0
$ – Conference champion; Rankings from AP small college poll

The 1969 UT Arlington Rebels football team was an American football team that represented the University of Texas at Arlington in the Southland Conference during the 1969 NCAA College Division football season. In their fourth year under head coach Burley Bearden, the team compiled a 5–5 record.

== Schedule ==
Date	Opponent	Site	Result	Attendance	Source
September 20	at Northeast Louisiana*	Brown Stadium; Monroe, LA	W 17–3	7,800	
September 27	New Mexico State*	Memorial Stadium; Arlington, TX	L 7–16	9,500	
October 4	at East Texas State*	Memorial Stadium; Commerce, TX	W 38–28	9,800	
October 11	at McNeese State*	Cowboy Stadium; Lake Charles, LA	W 13–7	9,000	
October 18	San Diego State*	Memorial Stadium; Arlington, TX	L 10–27	9,500	
October 25	at Trinity (TX)	Alamo Stadium; San Antonio, TX	W 34–7	1,646–1,684	
November 1	West Texas State*	Memorial Stadium; Arlington, TX	L 7–41	7,000	
November 8	No. 11 Abilene Christian	Memorial Stadium; Arlington, TX	L 24–28	9,800	
November 15	at No. 15 Arkansas State	Kays Stadium; Jonesboro, AR	L 3–13	6,500	
November 22	Lamar Tech	Memorial Stadium; Arlington, TX	W 53–16	6,500	
*Non-conference game; Rankings from AP Poll released prior to the game
