= 1970 Arkansas State Indians football team =

American college football season

1970 Arkansas State Indians football

AP small college national champion; UPI small college national champion; Southland champion; Pecan Bowl champion

Pecan Bowl, W 38–21 vs. Central Missouri State
- Conference: Southland Conference

Ranking
- Coaches: No. 1
- AP: No. 1
- Record: 11–0 (4–0 Southland)
- Head coach: Bennie Ellender (8th season)
- Home stadium: Kays Stadium

1970 Southland Conference football standings
	Conf.					Overall
Team	W		L		T	W		L		T
No. 1 Arkansas State $	4	–	0	–	0	11	–	0	–	0
No. 14 Abilene Christian	3	–	1	–	0	9	–	2	–	0
Trinity (TX)	2	–	2	–	0	5	–	6	–	0
Lamar Tech	1	–	3	–	0	3	–	7	–	0
UT Arlington	0	–	4	–	0	0	–	10	–	0
$ – Conference champion; Rankings from AP small college poll

The 1970 Arkansas State Indians football team was an American football team that represented Arkansas State University as a member of the Southland Conference during the 1970 NCAA College Division football season. Led by Bennie Ellender in his eighth and final season as head coach, the Arkansas State compiled an overall record of 11–0 with a mark of 4–0 in conference play, winning the Southland title for the third consecutive season. The Indians were invited to the Pecan Bowl, where they defeated Central Missouri State. Arkansas State was recognized by the Associated Press as the NCAA College Division national champion and by the UPI as the small college national champion.

Guard Bill Phillips received first-team honors on the 1970 Little All-America college football team. Running back Calvin Harrell defensive back Dennis Meyer received second-team honors.

== Schedule ==
Date	Time	Opponent	Rank	Site	Result	Attendance	Source
September 19	1:30 p.m.	at Wichita State*		Cessna Stadium; Wichita, KS	W 53–14	30,050–30,055	
September 26		at Southeastern Louisiana*	No. 1	Strawberry Stadium; Hammond, LA	W 12–3	6,500	
October 3		vs. The Citadel*	No. 1	War Memorial Stadium; Little Rock, AR	W 24–7	16,000	
October 10		Trinity (TX)	No. 1	Kays Stadium; Jonesboro, AR	W 21–14	8,500–9,500	
October 17		Louisiana Tech*	No. 1	Kays Stadium; Jonesboro, AR	W 38–17	8,300	
October 24		at No. 12 Abilene Christian	No. 1	Shotwell Stadium; Abilene, TX	W 28–23	10,000	
October 31		Lamar Tech	No. 1	Kays Stadium; Jonesboro, AR	W 69–7	7,200–8,500	
November 7		North Dakota*^{†}	No. 1	Kays Stadium; Jonesboro, AR	W 23–18	10,200–10,400	
November 14		at UT Arlington	No. 1	Turnpike Stadium; Arlington, TX	W 27–7	1,200	
November 21		Southern Illinois*	No. 1	Kays Stadium; Jonesboro, AR	W 27–13	9,000	
December 12	1:20 p.m.	vs. Central Missouri State*	No. 1	Turnpike Stadium; Arlington, TX (Pecan Bowl)	W 38–21	9,500	
*Non-conference game; ^{†}Homecoming; Rankings from AP Poll released prior to the game; All times are in Central time
