= 1968 college football season =

1968 college football season may refer to:

- 1968 NCAA University Division football season
- 1968 NCAA College Division football season
- 1968 NAIA football season
