= Burley Bearden =

American football coach

Biographical details
- Born: August 28, 1917; Waxahachie, Texas, U.S.
- Died: January 18, 1997 (aged 79); Mansfield, Texas, U.S.

Coaching career (HC unless noted)
- 1966–1970: Arlington State / UT Arlington

Head coaching record
- Overall: 27–24
- Bowls: 1–0

Accomplishments and honors

Championships
- 2 Southland (1966–1967)

Burley Lewis Bearden (August 28, 1917 – January 18, 1997) was an American college football coach. He served as the head football coach at the University of Texas at Arlington from 1966 to 1970, compiling record of 27–24. In 1967, he led his team to victory in the Pecan Bowl, beating North Dakota State, 13–0.

Bearden was born on August 28, 1917.

== Head coaching record ==
Year	Team	Overall	Conference	Standing	Bowl/playoffs
Arlington State / UT Arlington Rebels (Southland Conference) (1966–1970)
1966	Arlington State	6–4	3–1	T–1st	
1967	UT Arlington	10–1	4–0	1st	W Pecan
1968	UT Arlington	6–4	3–1	2nd	
1969	UT Arlington	5–5	2–2	T–2nd	
1970	UT Arlington	0–10	0–4	5th	
Arlington State / UT Arlington:		27–24	12–8		
Total:		27–24			
National championship Conference title Conference division title or championship game berth
