= 1969 Pecan Bowl =

- NCAA College Division regional final
Arkansas State Indians	Drake Bulldogs
(8–1–1)	(7–2–2)
29	21
Head coach: Bennie Ellender	Head coach: Jack Wallace
	1	2	3	4	Total
Arkansas State	7	15	0	7	29
Drake	0	0	13	8	21
- Date: December 16, 1969
- Season: 1969
- Stadium: Memorial Stadium
- Location: Arlington, Texas
- MVP: Offense: Wayne "Bubba" Crocker, Defense: Clovis Swinney (Arkansas State)
- National anthem: Marching Bands
- Halftime show: Marching Bands
- Attendance: 7,500

United States TV coverage
- Network: ABC

The 1969 Pecan Bowl was a college football bowl game played between Drake Bulldogs and Arkansas State Indians at Memorial Stadium in Arlington, Texas. It was one of four regional finals in the NCAA College Division, which became Division II (and III) in 1973. The other three regional finals in 1969 were the Boardwalk, Grantland Rice, and Camellia bowls.

ASU jumped out to a 22–0 lead at halftime and held on to win, 29–21.

The Pecan Bowl was played again in Arlington in 1970, then was succeeded by the Pioneer Bowl in Wichita Falls in 1971.

Arkansas State changed its nickname from Indians to Red Wolves in 2008.

== Scoring summary ==
First quarter

- Arkansas State - Lockhart 75-yard pass from Crocker (Everett kick)

Second quarter

- Arkansas State - Peyton 8-yard pass from Crocker (Crocker run)
- Arkansas State - Croker 5-yard run (Everett kick)

Third quarter

- Drake - Sharpe 2-yard run (pass failed)
- Drake - Miller 51-yard pass from Grejbowski (Chase kick)

Fourth quarter

- Arkansas State - Harrell 3-yard run (Everett kick)
- Drake- Rogers 1-yard pass from Grejbowski ( Herbert pass from Grejbowski)

== Individual statistics ==
Program cover for 1969 game

Rushing

ASU- Harrell 34-160, Carr 9-49

DU- Sharpe 19-60, Rodgers 3-16

Passing

ASU- Crocker 6-11-176

DU- Grejbowski 15-37-

Receiving

ASU- Lockhart 2-110, Harrell 1-42, Johnson 2-16

DU- Miller 9-192, Rodgers 5-63
