= 1970 Abilene Christian Wildcats football team =

American college football season

1970 Abilene Christian Wildcats football
- Conference: Southland Conference
- Record: 9–2 (3–1 Southland)
- Head coach: Wally Bullington (3rd season)
- Home stadium: Shotwell Stadium

1970 Southland Conference football standings
	Conf.					Overall
Team	W		L		T	W		L		T
No. 1 Arkansas State $	4	–	0	–	0	11	–	0	–	0
No. 14 Abilene Christian	3	–	1	–	0	9	–	2	–	0
Trinity (TX)	2	–	2	–	0	5	–	6	–	0
Lamar Tech	1	–	3	–	0	3	–	7	–	0
UT Arlington	0	–	4	–	0	0	–	10	–	0
$ – Conference champion; Rankings from AP small college poll

The 1970 Abilene Christian Wildcats football team was an American football team that represented Abilene Christian College (now known as Abilene Christian University) in the Southland Conference during the 1970 NCAA College Division football season. In their third year under head coach Wally Bullington, the team compiled a 9–2 record.

== Schedule ==
Date	Opponent	Rank	Site	Result	Attendance	Source
September 12	Howard Payne*		Shotwell Stadium; Abilene, TX	L 27–35	9,500	
September 19	East Texas State*		Shotwell Stadium; Abilene, TX	W 41–21	8,500	
September 26	at Angelo State*		San Angelo Stadium; San Angelo, TX	W 17–13	2,500	
October 3	at No. 14 Northern Colorado*		Jackson Field; Greeley, CO	W 38–7	7,500	
October 10	Eastern New Mexico*	No. 20	Shotwell Stadium; Abilene, TX	W 61–7	8,000	
October 17	at Lamar Tech	No. 11	Cardinal Stadium; Beaumont, TX	W 42–27	8,500–8,959	
October 24	No. 1 Arkansas State	No. 12	Shotwell Stadium; Abilene, TX	L 23–28	10,000	
October 31	at Drake*	No. 16	Drake Stadium; Des Moines, IA	W 33–13	13,500	
November 7	UT Arlington	No. 16	Shotwell Stadium; Abilene, TX	W 21–7	13,000	
November 14	at Trinity (TX)	No. 9	Alamo Stadium; San Antonio, TX	W 20–15	2,004–2,100	
November 30	vs. McMurry*	No. 15	Shotwell Stadium; Abilene, TX	W 43–26	6,000	
*Non-conference game; Rankings from AP Poll released prior to the game
