= Bennie Ellender =

American football player and coach (1925–2011)

- Ellender pictured in Jambalaya 1976, Tulane yearbook

Biographical details
- Born: March 2, 1925; Sulphur, Louisiana, U.S.
- Died: December 22, 2011 (aged 86); Metairie, Louisiana, U.S.

Playing career
- 1943–1944: Tulane
- 1946–1947: Tulane
- Positions: Quarterback, safety

Coaching career (HC unless noted)
- 1959: Tulane (freshmen)
- 1960–1961: Tulane (OB)
- 1962: Arkansas State (DB)
- 1963–1970: Arkansas State
- 1971–1975: Tulane

Head coaching record
- Overall: 79–49–4
- Bowls: 2–2

Accomplishments and honors

Championships
- 1 NCAA College Division (1970); 3 Southland (1968–1970)

Awards
- AFCA College Division Coach of the Year (1970)

Bennie Ellender Jr. (March 2, 1925 – December 22, 2011) was an American college football player and coach. He served as the head football coach at Arkansas State University from 1963 to 1970 and at Tulane University from 1971 to 1975, compiling a career college football record of 79–49–4.

Ellender led the Arkansas State program to three consecutive Pecan Bowl games, which was one of the regional bowl games set up for the NCAA College Division to choose a champion. His 1970 team finished 11–0 and was ranked #1 in the final polls, earning his team the College Division championship. Ellender was selected AFCA College Division Coach of the Year following the season. After the 1970 season, Ellender left ASU to become head football coach at his alma mater, Tulane.

== Head coaching record ==
Year	Team	Overall	Conference	Standing	Bowl/playoffs	Coaches^{#}	AP^{°}
Arkansas State Indians (NCAA College Division independent) (1963)
1963	Arkansas State	2–6					
Arkansas State Indians (Southland Conference) (1964–1970)
1964	Arkansas State	7–0–2	2–0–2	2nd		15	
1965	Arkansas State	6–3	1–3	5th			
1966	Arkansas State	7–2	2–2	T–3rd		11	6
1967	Arkansas State	4–5	2–2	3rd			
1968	Arkansas State	7–3–1	3–0–1	1st	L Pecan	14	15
1969	Arkansas State	8–1–1	4–0	1st	W Pecan	5	7
1970	Arkansas State	11–0	4–0	1st	W Pecan	1	1
Arkansas State:		52–20–4	18–7–3				
Tulane Green Wave (NCAA University Division / Division I independent) (1971–1975)
1971	Tulane	3–8					
1972	Tulane	6–5					
1973	Tulane	9–3			L Astro-Bluebonnet	15	20
1974	Tulane	5–6					
1975	Tulane	4–7					
Tulane:		27–29					
Total:		79–49–4					
National championship Conference title Conference division title or championship game berth
^{#}Rankings from final Coaches Poll.; ^{°}Rankings from final AP Poll.
