= 1968 Trinity Tigers football team =

American college football season

1968 Trinity Tigers football
- Conference: Southland Conference
- Record: 5–4 (2–2 Southland)
- Head coach: Earl Gartman (2nd season)
- Home stadium: E. M. Stevens Field; Alamo Stadium

1968 Southland Conference football standings
	Conf.					Overall
Team	W		L		T	W		L		T
No. 15 Arkansas State $	3	–	0	–	1	7	–	3	–	1
UT Arlington	3	–	1	–	0	6	–	4	–	0
Trinity (TX)	2	–	2	–	0	5	–	4	–	0
Abilene Christian	1	–	2	–	1	4	–	5	–	1
Lamar Tech	0	–	4	–	0	0	–	10	–	0
$ – Conference champion; Rankings from AP small college poll

The 1968 Trinity Tigers football team was an American football team that represented Trinity University in the Southland Conference during the 1968 NCAA College Division football season. In their second year under head coach Earl Gartman, the team compiled a 5–4 record.

== Schedule ==
Date	Time	Opponent	Rank	Site	Result	Attendance	Source
September 14		UNAM*		E. M. Stevens Field; San Antonio, TX	W 53–0	2,200–2,500	
September 21	7:30 p.m.	at Texas A&I*		Javelina Stadium; Kingsville, TX	L 0–6	10,000	
September 28		Southwest Texas State*		Alamo Stadium; San Antonio, TX	W 13–12	5,877	
October 5		at Texas Lutheran*		Matador Field; Seguin, TX	W 41–21	1,000	
October 19		at No. 10 Arkansas State	No. 16	War Memorial Stadium; Little Rock, AR	L 14–31	18,500	
October 26		at No. T–17 UT Arlington		Memorial Stadium; Arlington, TX	L 14–27	7,200	
November 2		Southeastern Louisiana*^{†}		Alamo Stadium; San Antonio, TX	L 3–7	3,179	
November 9		Lamar Tech		Alamo Stadium; San Antonio, TX	W 24–20	1,500–2,527	
November 16		Abilene Christian		Alamo Stadium; San Antonio, TX	W 13–7	2,000–2,100	
*Non-conference game; ^{†}Homecoming; Rankings from AP Poll released prior to the game; All times are in Central time
