= 1968 Abilene Christian Wildcats football team =

American college football season

1968 Abilene Christian Wildcats football
- Conference: Southland Conference
- Record: 4–5–1 (1–2–1 Southland)
- Head coach: Wally Bullington (1st season)
- Home stadium: Shotwell Stadium

1968 Southland Conference football standings
	Conf.					Overall
Team	W		L		T	W		L		T
No. 15 Arkansas State $	3	–	0	–	1	7	–	3	–	1
UT Arlington	3	–	1	–	0	6	–	4	–	0
Trinity (TX)	2	–	2	–	0	5	–	4	–	0
Abilene Christian	1	–	2	–	1	4	–	5	–	1
Lamar Tech	0	–	4	–	0	0	–	10	–	0
$ – Conference champion; Rankings from AP small college poll

The 1968 Abilene Christian Wildcats football team was an American football team that represented Abilene Christian College (now known as Abilene Christian University) in the Southland Conference during the 1968 NCAA College Division football season. In their first year under head coach Wally Bullington, the team compiled a 4–5–1 record.

== Schedule ==
Date	Opponent	Site	Result	Attendance	Source
September 14	at Northwestern State*	Demon Field; Natchitoches, LA	W 17–16	5,000–9,500	
September 21	East Texas State*	Shotwell Stadium; Abilene, TX	L 22–29	8,500–9,000	
September 28	Howard Payne*	Shotwell Stadium; Abilene, TX	W 50–49	5,500	
October 5	vs. McMurry*	Shotwell Stadium; Abilene, TX	L 3–16	11,000	
October 19	at Lamar Tech	Cardinal Stadium; Beaumont, TX	W 38–14	8,597–10,114	
October 26	No. 8 Arkansas State	Shotwell Stadium; Abilene, TX	T 17–17	5,500–8,800	
November 2	at Eastern New Mexico*	Portales, NM	L 14–26	2,000	
November 9	No. T–18 UT Arlington	Shotwell Stadium; Abilene, TX	L 20–30	9,000	
November 16	at Trinity (TX)	Alamo Stadium; San Antonio, TX	L 7–13	2,000–2,100	
November 23	Angelo State*	Shotwell Stadium; Abilene, TX	W 60–14	2,500	
*Non-conference game; Rankings from AP Poll released prior to the game
