= 1964 Trinity Tigers football team =

American college football season

1964 Trinity Tigers football
- Conference: Southland Conference
- Record: 3–7 (2–2 Southland)
- Head coach: W. C. McElhannon (3rd season)
- Home stadium: Alamo Stadium

1964 Southland Conference football standings
	Conf.					Overall
Team	W		L		T	W		L		T
Lamar Tech $	3	–	0	–	1	6	–	3	–	1
Arkansas State	2	–	0	–	2	7	–	0	–	2
Trinity (TX)	2	–	2	–	0	3	–	7	–	0
Abilene Christian	1	–	3	–	0	5	–	5	–	0
Arlington State	0	–	3	–	1	3	–	6	–	1
$ – Conference champion

The 1964 Trinity Tigers football team was an American football team that represented Trinity University in the Southland Conference during the 1964 NCAA College Division football season. In their third year under head coach W. C. McElhannon, the team compiled a 3–7 record.

== Schedule ==
Date	Opponent	Site	Result	Attendance	Source
September 12	at Houston*	Rice Stadium; Houston, TX	L 7–34	13,000	
September 19	Texas A&I*	Alamo Stadium; San Antonio, TX	L 21–32	4,046	
September 26	Southwest Texas State*	Alamo Stadium; San Antonio, TX	L 7–20	4,061–4,134	
October 3	No. 2 Lamar Tech	Alamo Stadium; San Antonio, TX	L 7–14	2,026–2,067	
October 10	at New Mexico State*	Memorial Stadium; Las Cruces, NM	L 6–14	6,000	
October 17	at Arkansas State	Kays Stadium; Jonesboro, AR	L 13–35	5,234–5,875	
October 24	at West Texas State*	Buffalo Bowl; Canyon, TX	L 6–21	3,000	
October 31	Abilene Christian	Alamo Stadium; San Antonio, TX	W 26–7	1,890	
November 7	McMurry*^{†}	Alamo Stadium; San Antonio, TX	W 30–24	1,909–1,989	
November 14	at Arlington State	Memorial Stadium; Arlington, TX	W 23–7	7,000	
*Non-conference game; ^{†}Homecoming; Rankings from AP Poll released prior to the game
