= 1968 Sam Houston State Bearkats football team =

American college football season

1968 Sam Houston State Bearkats football
- Conference: Lone Star Conference
- Record: 5–4–1 (3–3–1 LSC)
- Head coach: Tom Page (1st season)
- Home stadium: Pritchett Field

1968 Lone Star Conference football standings
	Conf.					Overall
Team	W		L		T	W		L		T
No. 2/6 Texas A&I $^	6	–	1	–	0	10	–	2	–	0
East Texas State	5	–	1	–	1	7	–	2	–	1
McMurry	5	–	2	–	0	8	–	2	–	0
Sam Houston State	3	–	3	–	1	5	–	4	–	1
Southwest Texas State	3	–	4	–	0	5	–	5	–	0
Sul Ross	2	–	4	–	1	5	–	4	–	1
Howard Payne	1	–	5	–	1	2	–	7	–	1
Stephen F. Austin	1	–	6	–	0	3	–	7	–	0
Tarleton State *	0	–	0	–	0	2	–	7	–	0
Angelo State *	0	–	0	–	0	2	–	9	–	0
$ – Conference champion; ^ – NAIA playoff participant * – did not complete for conference title; Rankings from NAIA poll and AP small college poll

The 1968 Sam Houston State Bearkats football team represented Sam Houston State College (now known as Sam Houston State University) as a member of the Lone Star Conference (LSC) during the 1968 NAIA football season. Led by first-year head coach Tom Page, the Bearkats compiled an overall record of 5–4–1 with a mark of 3–3–1 in conference play, and finished fourth in the LSC. After he served as an assistant coach for the Bearkats for a decade, Page was promoted to head coach in December 1967 after Paul Pierce resigned to take a full-time faculty position.

== Schedule ==
Date	Time	Opponent	Site	Result	Attendance	Source
September 21		Southwestern State (OK)*	Pritchett Field; Huntsville, TX	W 7–0		
September 28		Tarleton State*	Pritchett Field; Huntsville, TX	W 28–7		
October 5		at Troy State*	Rip Hewes Stadium; Dothan, AL	L 19–37		
October 12		at Howard Payne	Brownwood, TX	T 14–14		
October 19		at McMurry	Shotwell Stadium; Abilene, TX	L 7–10		
October 26		Southwest Texas State	Pritchett Field; Huntsville, TX	L 15–31		
November 2		at Stephen F. Austin	Memorial Stadium; Nacogdoches, TX (rivalry)	W 30–28		
November 9		East Texas State	Pritchett Field; Huntsville, TX	W 24–21	3,500	
November 16	7:30 p.m.	at No. 7 Texas A&I	Javelina Stadium; Kingsville, TX	L 21–54		
November 23		Sul Ross	Pritchett Field; Huntsville, TX	W 41–6		
*Non-conference game; Rankings from AP Poll released prior to the game; All times are in Central time
