= 1966 Trinity Tigers football team =

American college football season

1966 Trinity Tigers football
- Conference: Southland Conference
- Record: 5–4 (2–2 Southland)
- Head coach: Wilson Waites (1st season)
- Home stadium: Alamo Stadium

1966 Southland Conference football standings
	Conf.					Overall
Team	W		L		T	W		L		T
Arlington State +	3	–	1	–	0	6	–	4	–	0
Lamar Tech +	3	–	1	–	0	6	–	4	–	0
No. 6 Arkansas State	2	–	2	–	0	7	–	2	–	0
Trinity (TX)	2	–	2	–	0	5	–	4	–	0
Abilene Christian	0	–	4	–	0	4	–	6	–	0
+ – Conference co-champions; Rankings from AP small college poll

The 1966 Trinity Tigers football team was an American football team that represented Trinity University in the Southland Conference during the 1966 NCAA College Division football season. In their first year under head coach Wilson Waites, the team compiled a 5–4 record.

== Schedule ==
Date	Opponent	Site	Result	Attendance	Source
September 24	Southwest Texas State*	Alamo Stadium; San Antonio, TX	L 0–16	7,706	
October 1	Texas A&I*	Alamo Stadium; San Antonio, TX	L 6–7	3,500–3,507	
October 8	Southeastern Louisiana*	Alamo Stadium; San Antonio, TX	W 14–7	1,601	
October 15	at Angelo State*	San Angelo Stadium; San Angelo, TX	W 24–7	4,000	
October 22	at Arlington State	Memorial Stadium; Arlington, TX	L 7–20	7,000	
October 29	at Texas Lutheran*	Matador Stadium; Seguin, TX	W 17–7	1,500–2,000	
November 5	Lamar Tech	Alamo Stadium; San Antonio, TX	W 23–14	2,384	
November 12	Abilene Christian	Alamo Stadium; San Antonio, TX	W 37–27	2,250–2,482	
November 19	at Arkansas State	Kays Stadium; Jonesboro, AR	L 7–20	4,317–9,317	
*Non-conference game
