= 1969 Arkansas State Indians football team =

American college football season

1969 Arkansas State Indians football

Southland champion

Pecan Bowl, W 29–21 vs. Drake
- Conference: Southland Conference

Ranking
- Coaches: No. 5
- AP: No. 7
- Record: 8–1–1 (4–0 Southland)
- Head coach: Bennie Ellender (7th season)
- Home stadium: Kays Stadium; War Memorial Stadium

1969 Southland Conference football standings
	Conf.					Overall
Team	W		L		T	W		L		T
No. 7 Arkansas State $	4	–	0	–	0	8	–	1	–	1
Abilene Christian	2	–	2	–	0	8	–	2	–	0
UT Arlington	2	–	2	–	0	5	–	5	–	0
Trinity (TX)	2	–	2	–	0	4	–	6	–	0
Lamar Tech	0	–	4	–	0	3	–	7	–	0
$ – Conference champion; Rankings from AP small college poll

The 1969 Arkansas State Indians football team represented Arkansas State University as a member of the Southland Conference during the 1969 NCAA College Division football season. Led by seventh-year head coach Bennie Ellender, Arkansas State compiled an overall record of 8–1–1 with mark of 4–0 in conference play, winning the Southland title for the second consecutive season. The Indians were invited to the Pecan Bowl, where they beat Drake.

== Schedule ==
Date	Opponent	Rank	Site	Result	Attendance	Source
September 20	Eastern New Mexico*		Kays Stadium; Jonesboro, AR	W 53–20		
September 27	at The Citadel*	No. 5	Johnson Hagood Stadium; Charleston, SC	L 10–14	19,276	
October 4	at Tennessee Tech*	No. 16	Tucker Stadium; Cookeville, TN	W 29–22		
October 18	Southwestern Louisiana*	No. 16	War Memorial Stadium; Little Rock, AR	W 26–0	14,000	
October 25	No. 10 Abilene Christian		Kays Stadium; Jonesboro, AR	W 34–22	8,500	
November 1	Lamar Tech	No. 11	Kays Stadium; Jonesboro, AR	W 20–0	11,254	
November 8	Drake*^{†}	No. 4	Kays Stadium; Jonesboro, AR	T 21–21		
November 15	UT Arlington	No. 8	Kays Stadium; Jonesboro, AR	W 13–3	6,500	
November 22	at Trinity (TX)	No. 9	Alamo Stadium; San Antonio, TX	W 27–17	2,107–2,143	
December 13	vs. Drake*	No. 7	Memorial Stadium; Arlington, TX (Pecan Bowl)	W 29–21	7,500	
*Non-conference game; ^{†}Homecoming; Rankings from AP Poll released prior to the game
