= 1964 Lamar Tech Cardinals football team =

American college football season

1964 Lamar Tech Cardinals football

Southland champion

Pecan Bowl, L 17–19 vs. State College of Iowa
- Conference: Southland Conference
- Record: 6–3–1 (3–0–1 Southland)
- Head coach: Vernon Glass (2nd season)
- Home stadium: Cardinal Stadium

1964 Southland Conference football standings
| | Conf. | | | | | Overall |
| Team | W | | L | | T | W | | L | | T |
|---|---|---|---|---|---|---|---|---|---|---|
| Lamar Tech $ | 3 | – | 0 | – | 1 | 6 | – | 3 | – | 1 |
| Arkansas State | 2 | – | 0 | – | 2 | 7 | – | 0 | – | 2 |
| Trinity (TX) | 2 | – | 2 | – | 0 | 3 | – | 7 | – | 0 |
| Abilene Christian | 1 | – | 3 | – | 0 | 5 | – | 5 | – | 0 |
| Arlington State | 0 | – | 3 | – | 1 | 3 | – | 6 | – | 1 |
$ – Conference champion

The 1964 Lamar Tech Cardinals football season represented Lamar State College of Technology—now known as Lamar University—as a member of the Southland Conference during the 1964 NCAA College Division football season. Led by second-year head coach Vernon Glass, the Cardinals compiled an overall record of 6–3–1 with a mark of 3–0–1 in conference play, winning the Southland title. Lamar Tech was invited to the inaugural Pecan Bowl, losing to the State College of Iowa by the score of 19–17. The team played home game at the newly-opened Cardinal Stadium, located on Lamar Tech's campus in Beaumont, Texas.

Glass was named NCAA College Division Coach of the Year for the season.

== Schedule ==
| Date | Opponent | Rank | Site | Result | Attendance | Source |
|---|---|---|---|---|---|---|
| September 19 | East Central* | | Cardinal Stadium; Beaumont, TX | W 21–0 | 13,567 | |
| September 26 | Abilene Christian | | Cardinal Stadium; Beaumont, TX | W 14–3 | 14,381 | |
| October 3 | at Trinity (TX) | No. 2 | Alamo Stadium; San Antonio, TX | W 14–7 | 2,026–2,067 | |
| October 17 | at San Diego Marines* | No. 4 | Hall Field; San Diego, CA | L 28–33 | 5,000 | |
| October 24 | No. 7 Texas A&I* | No. 10 | Cardinal Stadium; Beaumont, TX | L 12–13 | 12,256 | |
| October 31 | Arlington State | | Cardinal Stadium; Beaumont, TX | W 17–7 | 11,021 | |
| November 7 | New Mexico State* | | Cardinal Stadium; Beaumont, TX | W 21–14 | 11,252 | |
| November 14 | at No. 10 Arkansas State | | Kays Stadium; Jonesboro, AR | T 7–7 | 4,400 | |
| November 21 | at Southwest Missouri State* | | Briggs Stadium; Springfield, MO | W 14–7 | 512 | |
| December 12 | vs. State College of Iowa* | | Shotwell Stadium; Abilene, TX (Pecan Bowl) | L 17–19 | 7,500 | |
*Non-conference game; Rankings from AP Poll released prior to the game
