= 1964 State College of Iowa Panthers football team =

American college football season

1964 State College of Iowa Panthers football

NCC champion

Pecan Bowl, W 19–17 vs. Lamar Tech
- Conference: North Central Conference
- Record: 9–2 (5–1 NCC)
- Head coach: Stan Sheriff (5th season)
- MVPs: Randy Schultz; Phil Minnick
- Home stadium: O. R. Latham Stadium

1964 North Central Conference football standings
	Conf.					Overall
Team	W		L		T	W		L		T
North Dakota State +	5	–	1	–	0	10	–	1	–	0
North Dakota +	5	–	1	–	0	8	–	1	–	0
State College of Iowa +	5	–	1	–	0	9	–	2	–	0
Morningside	2	–	4	–	0	4	–	5	–	0
South Dakota	2	–	4	–	0	3	–	6	–	0
South Dakota State	2	–	4	–	0	2	–	8	–	0
Augustana (SD)	0	–	6	–	0	1	–	8	–	0
+ – Conference co-champions

The 1964 State College of Iowa Panthers football team was an American football team that represented the State College of Iowa (now known as the University of Northern Iowa) as a member of the North Central Conference (NCC) during the 1964 NCAA College Division football season. In their fifth season under head coach Stan Sheriff, the Panthers compiled a 9–2 record (5–1 in conference games) and outscored opponents by a total of 269 to 100. The team concluded its season with the first bowl game victory in program history, a 19-17 win over Lamar Tech in the Pecan Bowl.

Junior halfback Randy Schultz received first-team honors on the 1964 Little All-America college football team after tallying more rushing yards than all of the Panthers' opponents. Three S.C.I. players were named to the all-NCC team: Schultz; tackle Merle Masonholder; and guard Phil Minnick. Schultz and Minnick were chosen as the team's co-most valuable players.

The team played its home games at O. R. Latham Stadium in Cedar Falls, Iowa.

== Schedule ==
Date	Opponent	Site	Result	Attendance	Source
September 12	Northern Michigan*	O. R. Latham Stadium; Cedar Falls, IA	W 14–7	7,500	
September 19	at Mankato State*	Blakeslee Stadium; Mankato, MN	W 36–0		
September 23	North Dakota State	O. R. Latham Stadium; Cedar Falls, IA	L 7–14	7,000	
October 3	at North Dakota	Memorial Stadium; Grand Forks, ND	W 34–0	2,500–2,677	
October 10	Drake*	O. R. Latham Stadium; Cedar Falls, IA	W 41–14		
October 17	Morningside^{†}	O. R. Latham Stadium; Cedar Falls, IA	W 24–14	7,600	
October 24	at Augustana (SD)	Howard Wood Stadium; Sioux Falls, SD	W 49–0	2,500	
October 31	at South Dakota State	Coughlin–Alumni Stadium; Brookings, SD	W 23–14		
November 7	at South Dakota	Inman Field; Vermillion, SD	W 13–6	5,000	
November 14	at Northern Illinois*	Glidden Field; DeKalb, IL	L 9–14	7,018–7,019	
December 12	vs. Lamar Tech*	Shotwell Stadium; Abilene, TX (Pecan Bowl)	W 19–17	7,500	
*Non-conference game; ^{†}Homecoming

== SCI players in the NFL ==
- Running back Randy Schultz was drafted by the Cleveland Browns in the 5th round (74th overall) of the 1966 NFL draft and was also drafted by the New York Jets in the 20th round (177th overall) of the AFL 1966 Draft.
