= 1964 North Dakota State Bison football team =

American college football season

1964 North Dakota State Bison football

NCC co-champion

Mineral Water Bowl, W 14–13 vs. Western State (CO)
- Conference: North Central Conference
- Record: 10–1 (5–1 NCC)
- Head coach: Darrell Mudra (2nd season)
- Home stadium: Dacotah Field

1964 North Central Conference football standings
	Conf.					Overall
Team	W		L		T	W		L		T
North Dakota State +	5	–	1	–	0	10	–	1	–	0
North Dakota +	5	–	1	–	0	8	–	1	–	0
State College of Iowa +	5	–	1	–	0	9	–	2	–	0
Morningside	2	–	4	–	0	4	–	5	–	0
South Dakota	2	–	4	–	0	3	–	6	–	0
South Dakota State	2	–	4	–	0	2	–	8	–	0
Augustana (SD)	0	–	6	–	0	1	–	8	–	0
+ – Conference co-champions

The 1964 North Dakota State Bison football team was an American football team that represented North Dakota State University during the 1964 NCAA College Division football season as a member of the North Central Conference. In their second year under head coach Darrell Mudra, the team compiled a 10–1 record, finished as NCC co-champion, and defeated Western State in the Mineral Water Bowl.

== Schedule ==
Date	Opponent	Site	Result	Attendance	Source
September 12	Moorhead State*	Dacotah Field; Fargo, ND	W 20–13		
September 19	Morningside	Dacotah Field; Fargo, ND	W 46–12		
September 26	at State College of Iowa	O. R. Latham Stadium; Cedar Falls, IA	W 14–7	7,000	
October 3	South Dakota State	Dacotah Field; Fargo, ND (rivalry)	W 20–13	6,000	
October 10	Augustana (SD)^{†}	Dacotah Field; Fargo, ND	W 42–7		
October 17	at North Dakota	Memorial Stadium; Grand Forks, ND (Nickel Trophy)	L 13–20	11,200–11,288	
October 24	Montana State*	Dacotah Field; Fargo, ND	W 7–0	4,500	
October 31	at South Dakota	Inman Field; Vermillion, SD	W 14–9	4,800	
November 7	at Idaho State*	Spud Bowl; Pocatello, ID	W 28–21	3,500	
November 14	at Milwaukee*	Pearse Field; Milwaukee, WI	W 34–6		
November 28	vs. Western State (CO)*	Roosevelt Field; Excelsior Springs, MO (Mineral Water Bowl)	W 14–13		
*Non-conference game; ^{†}Homecoming
