= 1966 Lamar Tech Cardinals football team =

American college football season

1966 Lamar Tech Cardinals football

Southland co-champion
- Conference: Southland Conference
- Record: 6–4 (3–1 Southland)
- Head coach: Vernon Glass (4th season)
- Home stadium: Cardinal Stadium

1966 Southland Conference football standings
	Conf.					Overall
Team	W		L		T	W		L		T
Arlington State +	3	–	1	–	0	6	–	4	–	0
Lamar Tech +	3	–	1	–	0	6	–	4	–	0
No. 6 Arkansas State	2	–	2	–	0	7	–	2	–	0
Trinity (TX)	2	–	2	–	0	5	–	4	–	0
Abilene Christian	0	–	4	–	0	4	–	6	–	0
+ – Conference co-champions; Rankings from AP small college poll

The 1966 Lamar Tech Cardinals football team represented Lamar State College of Technology—now known as Lamar University—as a member of the Southland Conference during the 1966 NCAA College Division football season. Led by fourth-year head coach Vernon Glass, the Cardinals compiled an overall record of 6–4 with a mark of 3–1 in conference play, sharing the Southland title .sharing the conference championship with Arlington State. Lamar Tech played home games at Cardinal Stadium in Beaumont, Texas.

== Schedule ==
Date	Opponent	Site	Result	Attendance	Source
September 17	at Western Michigan*	Waldo Stadium; Kalamazoo, MI	L 14–16	14,000–16,000	
September 24	Southwest Missouri State*	Cardinal Stadium; Beaumont, TX	W 55–12	15,643	
October 8	at Southwestern Louisiana*	McNaspy Stadium; Lafayette, LA (rivalry)	L 14–16	10,200	
October 15	Abilene Christian	Cardinal Stadium; Beaumont, TX	W 42–16	12,100–12,832	
October 22	McNeese State*	Cardinal Stadium; Beaumont, TX (Battle of the Border)	W 10–7	12,121	
October 29	at No. 5 Arkansas State	Kays Stadium; Jonesboro, AR	W 17–0	9,242	
November 5	at Trinity (TX)	Alamo Stadium; San Antonio, TX	L 14–23	2,384	
November 12	Louisiana Tech*	Cardinal Stadium; Beaumont, TX	W 21–16	10,691	
November 19	Arlington State	Cardinal Stadium; Beaumont, TX	W 27–7	11,417	
November 24	at Quantico Marines*	Butler Stadium; Quantico, VA	L 26–30	3,000	
*Non-conference game; Rankings from AP Poll released prior to the game
