= 1968 Texas A&I Javelinas football team =

American college football season

1968 Texas A&I Javelinas football

LSC champion

NAIA National Championship Game, L 35–43 vs. Troy State
- Conference: Lone Star Conference
- Record: 10–2 (6–1 LSC)
- Head coach: Gil Steinke (15th season)
- Captains: Dwayne Nix; Carlos Saldana
- Home stadium: Javelina Stadium

1968 Lone Star Conference football standings
	Conf.					Overall
Team	W		L		T	W		L		T
No. 2/6 Texas A&I $^	6	–	1	–	0	10	–	2	–	0
East Texas State	5	–	1	–	1	7	–	2	–	1
McMurry	5	–	2	–	0	8	–	2	–	0
Sam Houston State	3	–	3	–	1	5	–	4	–	1
Southwest Texas State	3	–	4	–	0	5	–	5	–	0
Sul Ross	2	–	4	–	1	5	–	4	–	1
Howard Payne	1	–	5	–	1	2	–	7	–	1
Stephen F. Austin	1	–	6	–	0	3	–	7	–	0
Tarleton State *	0	–	0	–	0	2	–	7	–	0
Angelo State *	0	–	0	–	0	2	–	9	–	0
$ – Conference champion; ^ – NAIA playoff participant * – did not complete for conference title; Rankings from NAIA poll and AP small college poll

The 1968 Texas A&I Javelinas football team represented the Texas College of Arts and Industries—now known as Texas A&M University–Kingsville—as a member of the Lone Star Conference (LSC) during the 1968 NAIA football season. Led by 15th-year head coach Gil Steinke, the Javelinas compiled an overall record of 10–2 with a mark of 6–1 in conference play, winning the LSC title for the second consecutive season. Texas A&I advanced to the NAIA football national championship playoffs, where the Javelinas defeated Northern State in the semifinal before losing to Troy State championship game.

== Schedule ==
Date	Time	Opponent	Rank	Site	Result	Attendance	Source
September 21	7:30 p.m.	Trinity (TX)*		Javelina Stadium; Kingsville, TX	W 6–0	10,000	
September 27		at Long Beach State*	No. 10	Veterans Memorial Stadium; Long Beach, CA	W 35–7	3,763	
October 5	8:00 p.m.	at Angelo State*	No. 7	San Angelo, TX	W 44–0		
October 12	7:30 p.m.	Stephen F. Austin	No. 6	Javelina Stadium; Kingsville, TX	W 34–0	14,000	
October 19	7:30 p.m.	at East Texas State	No. 5	Memorial Stadium; Commerce, TX	L 27–35		
October 26	7:30 p.m.	McMurry^{†}	No. 10	Javelina Stadium; Kingsville, TX	W 14–9	13,000	
November 2	7:30 p.m.	Sul Ross	No. 11	Javelina Stadium; Kingsville, TX	W 43–0		
November 9	2:00 p.m.	at Howard Payne	No. 8	Brownwood, TX	W 20–14		
November 16	7:30 p.m.	Sam Houston State	No. 7	Javelina Stadium; Kingsville, TX	W 54–21		
November 23	7:30 p.m.	at Southwest Texas State	No. 6	Evans Field; San Marcos, TX	W 39–0	13,500	
November 30	2:00 p.m.	Northern State*	No. 6	Javelina Stadium; Kingsville, TX (NAIA Semifinal)	W 20–0	8,500	
December 14	1:30 p.m.	vs. No. 11 Troy State*	No. 6	Cramton Bowl; Montgomery, AL (NAIA Championship)	L 35–43	15,000	
*Non-conference game; ^{†}Homecoming; Rankings from AP Poll released prior to the game; All times are in Central time
