= 1970 Lamar Tech Cardinals football team =

American college football season

1970 Lamar Tech Cardinals football
- Conference: Southland Conference
- Record: 3–7 (1–3 Southland)
- Head coach: Vernon Glass (8th season)
- Home stadium: Cardinal Stadium

1970 Southland Conference football standings
| | Conf. | | | | | Overall |
| Team | W | | L | | T | W | | L | | T |
|---|---|---|---|---|---|---|---|---|---|---|
| No. 1 Arkansas State $ | 4 | – | 0 | – | 0 | 11 | – | 0 | – | 0 |
| No. 14 Abilene Christian | 3 | – | 1 | – | 0 | 9 | – | 2 | – | 0 |
| Trinity (TX) | 2 | – | 2 | – | 0 | 5 | – | 6 | – | 0 |
| Lamar Tech | 1 | – | 3 | – | 0 | 3 | – | 7 | – | 0 |
| UT Arlington | 0 | – | 4 | – | 0 | 0 | – | 10 | – | 0 |
$ – Conference champion; Rankings from AP small college poll

The 1970 Lamar Tech Cardinals football team represented Lamar State College of Technology—now known as Lamar University—as a member of the Southland Conference during the 1970 NCAA College Division football season. Led by eighth-year head coach Vernon Glass, the Cardinals compiled an overall record of 3–7 with a mark of 1–3 in conference play, placing fourth in the Southland. Lamar Tech played home games at Cardinal Stadium in Beaumont, Texas.

== Schedule ==
| Date | Time | Opponent | Rank | Site | Result | Attendance | Source |
|---|---|---|---|---|---|---|---|
| September 19 | 7:30 p.m. | West Texas State* | | Cardinal Stadium; Beaumont, TX | W 33–28 | 14,217 | |
| September 26 | | No. 8 Louisiana Tech* | | Cardinal Stadium; Beaumont, TX | W 6–0 | 7,729 | |
| October 3 | | at Southern Illinois* | No. 17 | McAndrew Stadium; Carbondale, IL | L 16–32 | 10,000 | |
| October 11 | | McNeese State* | | Cardinal Stadium; Beaumont, TX (Battle of the Border) | L 12–17 | 15,165 | |
| October 17 | | No. 11 Abilene Christian | | Cardinal Stadium; Beaumont, TX | L 27–42 | 8,500–8,959 | |
| October 24 | | at No. 13 Southwestern Louisiana* | | McNaspy Stadium; Lafayette, LA (rivalry) | L 6–15 | 11,000–12,000 | |
| October 31 | | at No. 1 Arkansas State | | Kays Stadium; Jonesboro, AR | L 7–69 | 7,200–8,500 | |
| November 7 | | at Trinity (TX) | | Alamo Stadium; San Antonio, TX | L 31–37 | 3,500–4,500 | |
| November 14 | | at New Mexico State* | | Memorial Stadium; Las Cruces, NM | L 37–69 | 9,800 | |
| November 22 | | UT Arlington | | Cardinal Stadium; Beaumont, TX | W 24–0 | 9,821 | |
*Non-conference game; Rankings from AP Poll released prior to the game; All times are in Central time
