= 1968 Lamar Tech Cardinals football team =

American college football season

1968 Lamar Tech Cardinals football
- Conference: Southland Conference
- Record: 0–10 (0–4 Southland)
- Head coach: Vernon Glass (6th season)
- Home stadium: Cardinal Stadium

1968 Southland Conference football standings
	Conf.					Overall
Team	W		L		T	W		L		T
No. 15 Arkansas State $	3	–	0	–	1	7	–	3	–	1
UT Arlington	3	–	1	–	0	6	–	4	–	0
Trinity (TX)	2	–	2	–	0	5	–	4	–	0
Abilene Christian	1	–	2	–	1	4	–	5	–	1
Lamar Tech	0	–	4	–	0	0	–	10	–	0
$ – Conference champion; Rankings from AP small college poll

The 1968 Lamar Tech Cardinals football team represented Lamar State College of Technology—now known as Lamar University—as a member of the Southland Conference during the 1968 NCAA College Division football season. Led by sixth-year head coach Vernon Glass, the Cardinals compiled an overall record of 0–10 with a mark of 0–4 in conference play, placing last out of five teams in the Southland. Lamar Tech played home games at Cardinal Stadium in Beaumont, Texas.

== Schedule ==
Date	Opponent	Site	Result	Attendance	Source
September 14	at West Texas State*	Buffalo Bowl; Canyon, TX	L 7–45	15,500	
September 21	McNeese State*	Cardinal Stadium; Beaumont, TX (Battle of the Border)	L 0–10	14,633	
October 5	New Mexico State*	Cardinal Stadium; Beaumont, TX	L 14–16	8,558	
October 12	at Southern Illinois*	McAndrew Stadium; Carbondale, IL	L 7–24	7,500	
October 19	Abilene Christian	Cardinal Stadium; Beaumont, TX	L 14–38	8,597–10,114	
October 26	at Southwestern Louisiana*	McNaspy Stadium; Lafayette, LA (rivalry)	L 14–20	15,000	
November 2	at No. 13 Arkansas State	Kays Stadium; Jonesboro, AR	L 17–48	9,556	
November 9	at Trinity (TX)	Alamo Stadium; San Antonio, TX	L 20–24	1,500–2,527	
November 16	Louisiana Tech*	Cardinal Stadium; Beaumont, TX	L 7–34	10,218	
November 23	UT Arlington	Cardinal Stadium; Beaumont, TX	L 20–37	5,921–5,931	
*Non-conference game; Rankings from AP Poll released prior to the game
