= 1970 Trinity Tigers football team =

American college football season

1970 Trinity Tigers football
- Conference: Southland Conference
- Record: 5–6 (2–2 Southland)
- Head coach: Gene Offield (1st season)
- Home stadium: Alamo Stadium

1970 Southland Conference football standings
	Conf.					Overall
Team	W		L		T	W		L		T
No. 1 Arkansas State $	4	–	0	–	0	11	–	0	–	0
No. 14 Abilene Christian	3	–	1	–	0	9	–	2	–	0
Trinity (TX)	2	–	2	–	0	5	–	6	–	0
Lamar Tech	1	–	3	–	0	3	–	7	–	0
UT Arlington	0	–	4	–	0	0	–	10	–	0
$ – Conference champion; Rankings from AP small college poll

The 1970 Trinity Tigers football team was an American football team that represented Trinity University in the Southland Conference during the 1970 NCAA College Division football season. In their first year under head coach Gene Offield, the team compiled a 5–6 record.

== Schedule ==
Date	Opponent	Site	Result	Attendance	Source
September 12	at Whitewater State*	Warhawks Stadium; Whitewater, WI	W 35–10	6,500–9,000	
September 19	at Texas A&I*	Javelina Stadium; Kingsville, TX	L 0–23	14,700–14,900	
September 26	Southwest Texas State*	Alamo Stadium; San Antonio, TX	L 6–13	1,200	
October 3	at Davidson*	Richardson Stadium; Davidson, NC	W 20–9	6,000	
October 10	at No. 1 Arkansas State	Kays Stadium; Jonesboro, AR	L 14–21	8,500–9,500	
October 17	Southeastern Louisiana*	Alamo Stadium; San Antonio, TX	W 17–9	2,798	
October 24	at UT Arlington	Turnpike Stadium; Arlington, TX	W 24–0	4,000–7,000	
November 7	Lamar Tech	Alamo Stadium; San Antonio, TX	W 37–31	3,500–4,500	
November 14	Abilene Christian	Alamo Stadium; San Antonio, TX	L 15–20	2,004–2,100	
November 19	UTEP*	Alamo Stadium; San Antonio, TX	L 16–37	1,500–1,675	
November 28	at Southern Miss*	Faulkner Field; Hattiesburg, MS	L 31–53	5,000–7,000	
*Non-conference game; Rankings from AP Poll released prior to the game
