= Wally Bullington =

American gridiron football player and coach (1931–2018)

Biographical details
- Born: May 17, 1931; Athens, Alabama, U.S.
- Died: July 20, 2018 (aged 87); Abilene, Texas, U.S.
- Education: Abilene Christian University

Playing career
- 1949–1952: Abilene Christian
- Position: Offensive lineman

Coaching career (HC unless noted)
- 1960–1965: Abilene HS (TX)
- 1968–1976: Abilene Christian

Administrative career (AD unless noted)
- 1969–1988: Abilene Christian
- 2002: Abilene Christian (interim AD)

Head coaching record
- Overall: 62–32–2 (college)
- Bowls: 1–0
- Tournaments: 2–0 (NAIA D-I playoffs)

Accomplishments and honors

Championships
- 1 NAIA Division I (1973); 1 LSC (1973)

Awards
- LSC Coach of the Year (1973)

Wallace Bullington (May 17, 1931 – July 20, 2018), known as Coach Bully, was an American football player, coach, and college athletics administrator. He served Abilene Christian University in Abilene, Texas for 39 years as football player, assistant football coach, head football coach and athletic director before he retired from the university's athletic staff in 1988, but not before leading the school to its first national championship in 1973.

== Playing career ==
As a player on the offensive line at Abilene Christian, Bullington was a four-year letterman and helped lead the Wildcats to the only perfect season in school history for the 1950 season with a record of 11–0. Bullington was named to the All-Texas Conference football team in 1950, 1951 and 1952 and was selected an All-American in 1952. He was selected to the ACU "team of the century" as both a player and coach.

== Coaching career ==
Bullington got started in coaching at Abilene High School from 1960 to 1965. While an assistant coach at Abilene High School, the Dallas Morning News named the squad the "Team of the Century" due to their 49-game winning streak.

Bullington was the tenth head football coach at Abilene Christian University in Abilene, Texas and he held that position for nine seasons, from 1968 until 1976. His coaching record at Abilene Christian was 62–32–2.

The 1973 season saw his team finish with 11 wins and one loss while winning the NAIA Division I National Championship by defeating Elon College by a score of 42–14. In 1976, his team won the San Juncito Shrine Bowl with a victory over Southwestern Oklahoma State by a score of 24–7.

While coaching at ACU, Bullington coached Ove Johansson who kicked a world-record 69 yard field goal on October 16, 1976 at the homecoming game against East Texas State (now Texas A&M-Commerce).

The Lone Star Conference inducted Bullington into its "Wall of Honor" in 1999 for his accomplishments as a player, coach, and administrator.

== Return to athletics ==
In 2002, Bullington came out of retirement to serve as the interim athletic director at Abilene Christian, a position he had previously held.

== Death ==
Bullington died in Abilene, Texas on July 20, 2018, at the age of 87.

== Head coaching record ==
=== College ===
Year	Team	Overall	Conference	Standing	Bowl/playoffs
Abilene Christian Wildcats (Southland Conference) (1968–1972)
1968	Abilene Christian	4–5–1	1–2–1	4th	
1969	Abilene Christian	8–2	2–2	T–2nd	
1970	Abilene Christian	9–2	3–1	2nd	
1971	Abilene Christian	5–5	1–4	T–6th	
1972	Abilene Christian	3–8	1–4	T–5th	
Abilene Christian Wildcats (Lone Star Conference) (1973–1976)
1973	Abilene Christian	11–1	9–0	1st	W NAIA Division I Championship
1974	Abilene Christian	7–4	6–3	T–3rd	
1975	Abilene Christian	6–3–1	5–3–1	5th	
1976	Abilene Christian	9–2	5–2	2nd	W NAIA Shrine Bowl
Abilene Christian:		62–32–2	33–21–2		
Total:		62–32–2			
National championship Conference title Conference division title or championship game berth
