= 1964 South Dakota Coyotes football team =

American college football season

1964 South Dakota Coyotes football
- Conference: North Central Conference
- Record: 3–6 (2–4 NCC)
- Head coach: Marv Rist (2nd season)
- Home stadium: Inman Field

1964 North Central Conference football standings
	Conf.					Overall
Team	W		L		T	W		L		T
North Dakota State +	5	–	1	–	0	10	–	1	–	0
North Dakota +	5	–	1	–	0	8	–	1	–	0
State College of Iowa +	5	–	1	–	0	9	–	2	–	0
Morningside	2	–	4	–	0	4	–	5	–	0
South Dakota	2	–	4	–	0	3	–	6	–	0
South Dakota State	2	–	4	–	0	2	–	8	–	0
Augustana (SD)	0	–	6	–	0	1	–	8	–	0
+ – Conference co-champions

The 1964 South Dakota Coyotes football team was an American football team that represented the University of South Dakota in the North Central Conference (NCC) during the 1964 NCAA College Division football season. In its second season under head coach Marv Rist, the team compiled a 3–6 record (2–4 against NCC opponents), finished in a three-way tie for fourth place out of seven teams in the NCC, and was outscored by a total of 193 to 95. The team played its home games at Inman Field in Vermillion, South Dakota.

== Schedule ==
Date	Opponent	Site	Result	Attendance	Source
September 12	at Bemidji State*	Bemidji, MN	W 14–0	1,200	
September 19	at Nebraska*	Memorial Stadium; Lincoln, NE	L 0–56	34,200–38,625	
September 26	Drake*	Inman Field; Vermillion, SD	L 14–28	4,000–4,500	
October 3	at Augustana (SD)	Howard Wood Stadium; Sioux Falls, SD	W 14–12	5,000	
October 10	at Morningside	Public Schools Stadium; Sioux City, IA	L 14–42	5,500	
October 17	South Dakota State	Inman Field; Vermillion, SD (rivalry, Dakota Day)	W 10–7	8,500–9,000	
October 24	at North Dakota	Memorial Stadium; Grand Forks, ND (rivalry)	L 14–21	4,100–5,011	
October 31	North Dakota State	Inman Field; Vermillion, SD	L 9–14	4,800	
November 7	State College of Iowa	Inman Field; Vermillion, SD	L 6–13	5,000	
*Non-conference game
