= 1968 Troy State Red Wave football team =

American college football season

1968 Troy State Red Wave football
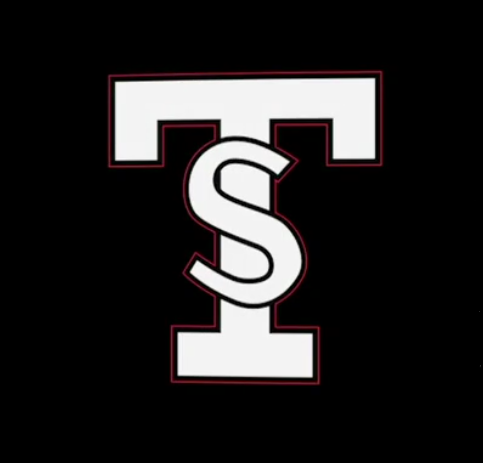

NAIA national champion ACC champion

NAIA National Championship Game, W 43–35 vs. Texas A&I
- Conference: Alabama Collegiate Conference
- Record: 11–1 (3–0 ACC)
- Head coach: Billy Atkins (2nd season)
- Offensive scheme: Spread offense
- Home stadium: Veterans Memorial Stadium

The 1968 Troy State Red Wave football team represented Troy State University as a member of the Alabama Collegiate Conference (ACC) during the 1968 NAIA football season. Led by second-year head coach Billy Atkins, the Red Wave finished the season with an 11–1 record and advanced to the NAIA playoffs. Troy State defeated Texas A&I, 43–35, in the NAIA National Championship Game to secure the program's first national championship. The Red Wave played their home games at Veterans Memorial Stadium in Troy, Alabama.

== Schedule ==
Date	Time	Opponent	Rank	Site	Result	Attendance	Source
September 14		at Samford*		Seibert Stadium; Homewood, AL	W 49–31		
September 21		Gordon Military*		Veterans Memorial Stadium; Troy, AL	W 47–7		
September 28		vs. Livingston		Cramton Bowl; Montgomery, AL	W 42–23		
October 5		Sam Houston State*		Rip Hewes Stadium; Dothan, AL	W 37–19		
October 12		Delta State*		Veterans Memorial Stadium; Troy, AL	W 35–23		
October 19		at Jacksonville State		Paul Snow Stadium; Jacksonville, AL (Battle for the Ol' School Bell)	W 31–0		
October 26		at Florence State		Braly Municipal Stadium; Florence, AL	W 41–0		
November 2		McNeese State*		Veterans Memorial Stadium; Troy, AL	W 52–0	9,000	
November 9		at Tennessee–Martin*		Pacer Stadium; Martin, TN	L 3–12	6,500	
November 16		Concord*		Veterans Memorial Stadium; Troy, AL	W 76–0		
November 28		vs. No. 3 Willamette*	No. 4	Cramton Bowl; Montgomery, AL (NAIA Semifinal)	W 63–10		
December 14	1:30 p.m.	vs. No. 1 Texas A&I*	No. 4	Cramton Bowl; Montgomery, AL (NAIA Championship)	W 43–35	15,000	
*Non-conference game; Rankings from NAIA Poll released prior to the game; All times are in Central time
