= 1964 North Dakota Fighting Sioux football team =

American college football season

1964 North Dakota Fighting Sioux football

NCC co-champion
- Conference: North Central Conference
- Record: 8–1 (5–1 NCC)
- Head coach: Marvin C. Helling (8th season)
- Home stadium: Memorial Stadium

1964 North Central Conference football standings
	Conf.					Overall
Team	W		L		T	W		L		T
North Dakota State +	5	–	1	–	0	10	–	1	–	0
North Dakota +	5	–	1	–	0	8	–	1	–	0
State College of Iowa +	5	–	1	–	0	9	–	2	–	0
Morningside	2	–	4	–	0	4	–	5	–	0
South Dakota	2	–	4	–	0	3	–	6	–	0
South Dakota State	2	–	4	–	0	2	–	8	–	0
Augustana (SD)	0	–	6	–	0	1	–	8	–	0
+ – Conference co-champions

The 1964 North Dakota Fighting Sioux football team, also known as the Nodaks, was an American football team that represented the University of North Dakota in the North Central Conference (NCC) during the 1964 NCAA College Division football season. In its eighth year under head coach Marvin C. Helling, the team compiled an 8–1 record (5–1 against NCC opponents), tied for the NCC championship, and outscored opponents by a total of 199 to 110. The team played its home games at Memorial Stadium in Grand Forks, North Dakota.

== Schedule ==
Date	Opponent	Site	Result	Attendance	Source
September 12	St. Thomas (MN)*	Memorial Stadium; Grand Forks, ND	W 30–6	5,500–5,567	
September 19	at Bemidji State*	Bemidji, MN	W 10–0	1,200	
September 26	at Morningside	Public Schools Stadium; Sioux City, IA	W 26–8	3,500	
October 3	State College of Iowa	Memorial Stadium; Grand Forks, ND	L 0–34	2,500–2,677	
October 10	at South Dakota State	Brookings, SD (Hobo Day)	W 35–28	9,300	
October 17	North Dakota State	Memorial Stadium; Grand Forks, ND (rivalry)	W 20–13	11,200–11,288	
October 24	South Dakota	Memorial Stadium; Grand Forks, ND (rivalry)	W 21–14	4,100–5,011	
October 31	Montana State	Memorial Stadium; Grand Forks, ND	W 9–7	4,000–4,239	
November 7	at Augustana (SD)	Howard Wood Stadium; Sioux Falls, SD	W 48–0	500	
*Non-conference game
