= 1968 NAIA football season =

American college football season

- Regular season: August–November 1968
- Postseason: November 28–December 14, 1968
- National Championship: Cramton Bowl Montgomery, AL
- Champion: Troy State

The 1968 NAIA football season was the 13th season of college football sponsored by the NAIA.

The season was played from August to November 1968, culminating in the 1968 NAIA Championship Bowl, played this year on December 14, 1968 at the Cramton Bowl in Montgomery, Alabama.

Troy State defeated Texas A&I in the Championship Bowl, 43–35, to win their first NAIA national title.

== Conference realignment ==
=== Conference changes ===
- This was the final season of play for the Central Intercollegiate Conference. After the end of play, the remaining members of the conference, four from Kansas and one from Nebraska, would subsequently join the Rocky Mountain Athletic Conference.

== Conference standings ==
1968 Arkansas Intercollegiate Conference football standings
	Conf.					Overall
Team	W		L		T	W		L		T
No. 4 Arkansas Tech $	5	–	1	–	0	10	–	2	–	0
Henderson State	4	–	2	–	0	8	–	3	–	0
Ouachita Baptist	4	–	2	–	0	7	–	2	–	1
State College of Arkansas	3	–	3	–	0	7	–	3	–	0
Arkansas A&M	3	–	3	–	0	5	–	4	–	0
Southern Arkansas	2	–	4	–	0	3	–	6	–	0
Harding	0	–	6	–	0	2	–	8	–	0
$ – Conference champion; Rankings from NAIA poll

1968 Carolinas Conference football standings
	Conf.					Overall
Team	W		L		T	W		L		T
Lenoir Rhyne +	5	–	1	–	0	7	–	2	–	0
Presbyterian +	5	–	1	–	0	7	–	4	–	0
Elon	3	–	3	–	0	4	–	5	–	0
Western Carolina	3	–	3	–	0	4	–	5	–	0
Newberry	2	–	4	–	0	3	–	7	–	0
Catawba	2	–	4	–	0	2	–	8	–	0
Guilford	1	–	5	–	0	2	–	8	–	0
+ – Conference co-champions

1968 Central Intercollegiate Athletic Association football standings
	Conf.					Overall
Team	W		L		T	W		L		T
No. 12 Morgan State $	7	–	1	–	0	8	–	1	–	0
No. 14 North Carolina A&T	6	–	1	–	0	8	–	1	–	0
North Carolina College	6	–	2	–	0	6	–	2	–	0
Elizabeth City State	7	–	1	–	0	8	–	1	–	0
Maryland State	3	–	2	–	1	5	–	2	–	1
Virginia State	5	–	2	–	1	5	–	2	–	1
Hampton	4	–	2	–	1	4	–	3	–	2
Livingstone	4	–	3	–	0	4	–	4	–	0
Howard	2	–	3	–	0	3	–	5	–	0
Norfolk State	2	–	4	–	1	2	–	5	–	1
Johnson C. Smith	3	–	3	–	0	5	–	4	–	0
Virginia Union	2	–	6	–	0	2	–	6	–	0
Delaware State	2	–	4	–	0	4	–	6	–	0
Winston-Salem State	2	–	5	–	1	3	–	5	–	1
Fayetteville State	2	–	5	–	0	2	–	5	–	0
Shaw	1	–	7	–	1	1	–	7	–	1
Saint Paul's (VA)	0	–	7	–	0	1	–	7	–	0
$ – Conference champion; Conference standings were determined by Dickinson Rating; Rankings from NAIA poll for North Carolina A&T and AP small college poll for Morgan State

1968 Central Intercollegiate Conference football standings
	Conf.					Overall
Team	W		L		T	W		L		T
Nebraska–Omaha $	4	–	0	–	0	4	–	5	–	0
Emporia State	2	–	1	–	1	5	–	2	–	2
Pittsburg State	2	–	1	–	1	4	–	5	–	1
Washburn	1	–	3	–	0	2	–	7	–	0
Fort Hays State	0	–	4	–	0	2	–	7	–	0
$ – Conference champion

1968 College Conference of Illinois and Wisconsin football standings
	Conf.					Overall
Team	W		L		T	W		L		T
Augustana (IL) $	6	–	1	–	0	6	–	3	–	0
Illinois Wesleyan	5	–	2	–	0	6	–	3	–	0
North Park	5	–	2	–	0	6	–	3	–	0
Carroll (WI)	4	–	3	–	0	5	–	3	–	0
Carthage	4	–	3	–	0	4	–	5	–	0
Millikin	3	–	4	–	0	3	–	5	–	0
North Central (IL)	1	–	6	–	0	1	–	8	–	0
Elmhurst	0	–	7	–	0	0	–	9	–	0
$ – Conference champion

1968 Eastern Football Conference football standings
	Conf.					Overall
Team	W		L		T	W		L		T
Southern Connecticut State $	4	–	0	–	1	4	–	4	–	1
Central Connecticut State	3	–	2	–	0	6	–	2	–	1
Bridgeport	3	–	2	–	0	4	–	5	–	0
Trenton State	2	–	2	–	1	5	–	2	–	1
Glassboro State	1	–	4	–	0	2	–	6	–	0
Montclair State	1	–	4	–	0	2	–	7	–	0
$ – Conference champion

1968 Evergreen Conference football standings
	Conf.					Overall
Team	W		L		T	W		L		T
Central Washington $	6	–	0	–	0	6	–	3	–	0
Eastern Washington	3	–	3	–	0	3	–	7	–	0
Western Washington	2	–	4	–	0	3	–	6	–	0
Whitworth	1	–	5	–	0	1	–	9	–	0
$ – Conference champion

1968 Frontier Conference football standings
	Conf.					Overall
Team	W		L		T	W		L		T
Eastern Montana $	5	–	0	–	0	7	–	2	–	0
Northern Montana	4	–	1	–	0	6	–	2	–	0
Western Montana	3	–	2	–	0	3	–	4	–	0
Montana Tech	2	–	3	–	0	2	–	6	–	0
Carroll (MT)	1	–	4	–	0	1	–	7	–	0
Rocky Mountain	0	–	5	–	0	1	–	7	–	0
$ – Conference champion

1968 Gateway Conference football standings
	Conf.					Overall
Team	W		L		T	W		L		T
Lakeland $	4	–	0	–	0	7	–	2	–	0
Milton	3	–	1	–	0	?	–	?	–	?
Eureka	2	–	2	–	0	2	–	5	–	1
Northwestern (WI)	1	–	3	–	0	?	–	?	–	?
St. Procopius	0	–	4	–	0	2	–	6	–	0
$ – Conference champion

1968 Gulf States Conference football standings
	Conf.					Overall
Team	W		L		T	W		L		T
No. 8/10 Southwestern Louisiana $	4	–	1	–	0	8	–	2	–	0
Louisiana Tech	3	–	2	–	0	9	–	2	–	0
Northeast Louisiana State	3	–	2	–	0	6	–	4	–	0
Northwestern State	2	–	3	–	0	5	–	4	–	0
Southeastern Louisiana	2	–	3	–	0	4	–	6	–	0
McNeese State	1	–	4	–	0	4	–	6	–	0
$ – Conference champion; Rankings from NAIA poll and AP small college poll

1968 Hoosier Conference football standings
	Conf.					Overall
Team	W		L		T	W		L		T
Manchester (IN) +	5	–	1	–	0	7	–	1	–	0
Anderson (IN) +	5	–	1	–	0	6	–	3	–	0
Hanover	4	–	2	–	0	5	–	4	–	0
Earlham	3	–	3	–	0	4	–	3	–	1
Taylor	2	–	4	–	0	3	–	5	–	1
Indiana Central	1	–	5	–	0	2	–	6	–	0
Franklin (IN)	1	–	5	–	0	2	–	8	–	0
+ – Conference co-champions

1968 Iowa Conference football standings
	Conf.					Overall
Team	W		L		T	W		L		T
Wartburg $	6	–	0	–	1	7	–	1	–	1
Simpson (IA)	5	–	0	–	2	6	–	1	–	2
Upper Iowa	4	–	3	–	0	4	–	4	–	0
Central (IA)	3	–	3	–	1	5	–	3	–	1
Dubuque	3	–	4	–	0	4	–	5	–	0
William Penn	2	–	5	–	0	4	–	5	–	0
Buena Vista	2	–	5	–	0	2	–	7	–	0
Luther	1	–	6	–	0	2	–	7	–	0
$ – Conference champion

1968 Kansas Collegiate Athletic Conference football standings
	Conf.					Overall
Team	W		L		T	W		L		T
Southwestern (KS) $	7	–	1	–	1	7	–	1	–	1
Kansas Wesleyan	7	–	2	–	0	7	–	2	–	0
Friends	6	–	3	–	0	6	–	3	–	0
Ottawa	5	–	4	–	0	5	–	4	–	0
College of Emporia	5	–	4	–	0	5	–	4	–	0
Bethany (KS)	3	–	5	–	1	3	–	5	–	1
Baker	3	–	6	–	0	3	–	6	–	0
Bethel (KS)	3	–	6	–	0	3	–	6	–	0
Sterling	3	–	6	–	0	3	–	6	–	0
McPherson	2	–	7	–	0	2	–	7	–	0
$ – Conference champion

1968 Lone Star Conference football standings
	Conf.					Overall
Team	W		L		T	W		L		T
No. 2/6 Texas A&I $^	6	–	1	–	0	10	–	2	–	0
East Texas State	5	–	1	–	1	7	–	2	–	1
McMurry	5	–	2	–	0	8	–	2	–	0
Sam Houston State	3	–	3	–	1	5	–	4	–	1
Southwest Texas State	3	–	4	–	0	5	–	5	–	0
Sul Ross	2	–	4	–	1	5	–	4	–	1
Howard Payne	1	–	5	–	1	2	–	7	–	1
Stephen F. Austin	1	–	6	–	0	3	–	7	–	0
Tarleton State *	0	–	0	–	0	2	–	7	–	0
Angelo State *	0	–	0	–	0	2	–	9	–	0
$ – Conference champion; ^ – NAIA playoff participant * – did not complete for conference title; Rankings from NAIA poll and AP small college poll

1968 Michigan Intercollegiate Athletic Association football standings
	Conf.					Overall
Team	W		L		T	W		L		T
No. 12 Alma $	5	–	0	–	0	8	–	0	–	0
Albion	4	–	1	–	0	6	–	3	–	0
Hope	2	–	3	–	0	4	–	5	–	0
Olivet	2	–	3	–	0	3	–	5	–	0
Kalamazoo	1	–	4	–	0	2	–	6	–	0
Adrian	1	–	4	–	0	1	–	7	–	0
$ – Conference champion; Rankings from NAIA poll

1968 Mid-Ohio Conference football standings
	Conf.					Overall
Team	W		L		T	W		L		T
Defiance $	3	–	0	–	0	7	–	2	–	0
Findlay	2	–	1	–	0	4	–	6	–	0
Wilmington (OH)	1	–	2	–	0	2	–	7	–	1
Bluffton	0	–	3	–	0	2	–	7	–	0
$ – Conference champion

1968 Midwest Conference football standings
	Conf.					Overall
Team	W		L		T	W		L		T
Ripon $	7	–	1	–	0	7	–	1	–	0
Monmouth (IL)	6	–	1	–	1	6	–	1	–	1
Cornell (IA)	6	–	2	–	0	6	–	2	–	0
St. Olaf	5	–	2	–	1	5	–	2	–	1
Coe	4	–	4	–	0	4	–	4	–	0
Beloit	3	–	5	–	0	3	–	5	–	0
Carleton	3	–	5	–	0	3	–	5	–	0
Grinnell	3	–	5	–	0	3	–	5	–	0
Lawrence	2	–	6	–	0	2	–	6	–	0
Knox	0	–	8	–	0	0	–	8	–	0
$ – Conference champion

1968 Minnesota Intercollegiate Athletic Conference football standings
	Conf.					Overall
Team	W		L		T	W		L		T
Gustavus Adolphus $	6	–	0	–	1	7	–	1	–	1
No. 18 Hamline	6	–	1	–	0	8	–	1	–	0
Concordia (MN)	4	–	3	–	0	7	–	3	–	0
Saint John's (MN)	4	–	3	–	0	6	–	4	–	0
Macalester	3	–	3	–	1	5	–	4	–	1
Minnesota–Duluth	2	–	5	–	0	4	–	6	–	0
St. Thomas (MN)	2	–	5	–	0	2	–	8	–	0
Augsburg	0	–	7	–	0	1	–	8	–	0
$ – Conference champion; Rankings from NAIA poll

1968 Missouri College Athletic Union football standings
	Conf.					Overall
Team	W		L		T	W		L		T
William Jewell $	2	–	0	–	0	9	–	1	–	0
Tarkio	3	–	1	–	0	6	–	3	–	0
Central Methodist	2	–	1	–	1	6	–	1	–	1
Graceland	2	–	3	–	0	4	–	5	–	0
Missouri Valley	1	–	2	–	1	3	–	4	–	3
Culver–Stockton	0	–	3	–	0	5	–	4	–	0
$ – Conference champion

1968 Nebraska College Conference football standings
	Conf.					Overall
Team	W		L		T	W		L		T
Kearney State $	4	–	0	–	0	5	–	4	–	0
Chadron State	3	–	1	–	0	8	–	1	–	0
Wayne State (NE)	2	–	2	–	0	3	–	5	–	0
Hastings	1	–	3	–	0	3	–	6	–	0
Peru State	0	–	4	–	0	2	–	6	–	0
$ – Conference champion

1968 North Dakota College Athletic Conference football standings
	Conf.					Overall
Team	W		L		T	W		L		T
Jamestown $	6	–	0	–	0	8	–	0	–	0
Minot State	4	–	1	–	1	5	–	2	–	1
Wahpeton Science	4	–	2	–	0	?	–	?	–	?
Valley City State	2	–	2	–	2	2	–	3	–	2
Dickinson State	2	–	3	–	1	3	–	4	–	1
Mayville State	1	–	5	–	0	1	–	7	–	0
Ellendale	0	–	6	–	0	0	–	8	–	0
$ – Conference champion

1968 Northern Intercollegiate Conference football standings
	Conf.					Overall
Team	W		L		T	W		L		T
Mankato State +	4	–	1	–	0	5	–	4	–	0
Winona State +	4	–	1	–	0	5	–	4	–	0
St. Cloud State	3	–	2	–	0	5	–	3	–	1
Moorhead State	3	–	2	–	0	4	–	5	–	0
Bemidji State	1	–	4	–	0	3	–	6	–	0
Michigan Tech	0	–	5	–	0	1	–	7	–	0
Minnesota Morris *			–			7	–	1	–	0
+ – Conference co-champions; * – did not compete for championship

1968 Northwest Conference football standings
	Conf.					Overall
Team	W		L		T	W		L		T
No. 6 Willamette $^	6	–	0	–	0	9	–	1	–	0
Linfield	4	–	1	–	1	6	–	2	–	1
Lewis & Clark	4	–	2	–	0	6	–	3	–	0
Pacific Lutheran	2	–	2	–	2	3	–	4	–	2
Whitman	1	–	4	–	1	4	–	4	–	1
College of Idaho	1	–	4	–	1	3	–	5	–	1
Pacific (OR)	0	–	5	–	1	1	–	7	–	1
$ – Conference champion; ^ – NAIA playoff participant; Rankings from NAIA poll

1968 Oklahoma Collegiate Conference football standings
	Conf.					Overall
Team	W		L		T	W		L		T
SW Oklahoma State $	6	–	1	–	0	7	–	4	–	0
East Central	5	–	1	–	1	7	–	2	–	1
Northeastern State	4	–	3	–	0	6	–	4	–	0
SE Oklahoma State	4	–	3	–	0	4	–	5	–	1
Central State (OK)	3	–	3	–	1	6	–	4	–	1
Panhandle	2	–	4	–	1	5	–	5	–	1
NW Oklahoma State	1	–	5	–	1	1	–	7	–	2
Langston	1	–	6	–	0	2	–	9	–	0
$ – Conference champion

1968 Oregon Collegiate Conference football standings
	Conf.					Overall
Team	W		L		T	W		L		T
Oregon College $	4	–	0	–	0	7	–	2	–	0
Southern Oregon	3	–	1	–	0	4	–	6	–	0
Oregon Tech	2	–	2	–	0	2	–	6	–	1
Eastern Oregon	1	–	3	–	0	1	–	8	–	0
George Fox	0	–	4	–	0	0	–	8	–	0
$ – Conference champion

1968 Rocky Mountain Athletic Conference football standings
	Conf.					Overall
Team	W		L		T	W		L		T
Adams State $	3	–	0	–	0	8	–	1	–	0
Colorado State–Greeley	1	–	1	–	0	5	–	3	–	0
Western State (CO)	1	–	2	–	0	3	–	6	–	0
Colorado Mines	0	–	2	–	0	4	–	4	–	0
$ – Conference champion

1968 South Dakota Intercollegiate Conference football standings
	Conf.					Overall
Team	W		L		T	W		L		T
No. 5 Northern State $^	6	–	0	–	0	9	–	1	–	0
Black Hills State	4	–	2	–	0	4	–	5	–	0
South Dakota Tech	3	–	2	–	1	3	–	4	–	1
Dakota Wesleyan	3	–	3	–	0	6	–	3	–	0
Huron	2	–	4	–	0	2	–	6	–	1
General Beadle	1	–	4	–	1	2	–	5	–	1
Southern State (SD)	1	–	5	–	0	1	–	8	–	0
$ – Conference champion; ^ – NAIA playoff participant; Rankings from NAIA poll

1968 Southern California Intercollegiate Athletic Conference football standings
	Conf.					Overall
Team	W		L		T	W		L		T
Whittier $	4	–	1	–	0	5	–	4	–	0
Occidental	3	–	1	–	1	3	–	5	–	1
Redlands	3	–	2	–	0	5	–	5	–	0
Claremont-Mudd	2	–	2	–	1	3	–	4	–	2
Pomona	2	–	3	–	0	4	–	5	–	1
Caltech	0	–	5	–	0	1	–	7	–	0
$ – Conference champion; Caltech forfeited to Whittier and Redlands; the forfeits were included only in conference records.

1968 Southern Intercollegiate Athletic Conference football standings
	Conf.					Overall
Team	W		L		T	W		L		T
Division I
No. T–19 Florida A&M x	5	–	0	–	0	8	–	2	–	0
South Carolina State	4	–	1	–	0	7	–	2	–	0
Bethune–Cookman	3	–	2	–	0	4	–	4	–	0
Alabama A&M	2	–	3	–	0	5	–	4	–	0
Morris Brown	1	–	4	–	0	2	–	7	–	0
Allen	0	–	5	–	0	0	–	7	–	0
Division II
Tuskegee x	6	–	0	–	0	8	–	2	–	0
Alabama State	4	–	1	–	1	8	–	1	–	1
Lane	4	–	1	–	0	6	–	2	–	0
Fort Valley State	4	–	2	–	0	7	–	2	–	0
Clark (GA)	3	–	4	–	0	4	–	5	–	0
Morehouse	2	–	3	–	1	3	–	3	–	2
Fisk	1	–	6	–	0	2	–	8	–	0
Knoxville	0	–	7	–	0	0	–	7	–	0
x – Division champion/co-champions; Rankings from UPI small college poll

1968 Southwestern Athletic Conference football standings
	Conf.					Overall
Team	W		L		T	W		L		T
No. 3 Alcorn A&M +	6	–	1	–	0	8	–	1	–	0
Grambling +	6	–	1	–	0	9	–	2	–	0
Texas Southern +	6	–	1	–	0	6	–	4	–	0
Arkansas AM&N	4	–	3	–	0	5	–	5	–	0
Southern	3	–	4	–	0	4	–	6	–	0
Prairie View A&M	2	–	5	–	0	4	–	6	–	0
Jackson State	1	–	6	–	0	3	–	6	–	0
Wiley	0	–	7	–	0	2	–	8	–	0
+ – Conference co-champions; Rankings from NAIA poll

1968 Tri-State Conference football standings
	Conf.					Overall
Team	W		L		T	W		L		T
Westmar $	6	–	0	–	0	9	–	0	–	0
Concordia (NE)	5	–	1	–	0	6	–	3	–	0
Northwestern (IA)	4	–	2	–	0	7	–	2	–	0
Dana	2	–	4	–	0	3	–	6	–	0
Sioux Falls	2	–	4	–	0	3	–	6	–	0
Yankton	1	–	4	–	1	1	–	7	–	1
Midland	0	–	5	–	1	0	–	8	–	1
$ – Conference champion

1968 West Penn Conference football standings
	Conf.					Overall
Team	W		L		T	W		L		T
No. 19 Waynesburg $	2	–	0	–	0	7	–	2	–	0
Westminster (PA)	1	–	1	–	0	6	–	2	–	0
Geneva	0	–	2	–	0	0	–	7	–	1
$ – Conference champion; Rankings from NAIA poll

1968 West Virginia Intercollegiate Athletic Conference football standings
	Conf.					Overall
Team	W		L		T	W		L		T
West Virginia State $	5	–	1	–	0	8	–	1	–	0
Fairmont State	3	–	1	–	0	6	–	2	–	0
Salem	6	–	2	–	0	6	–	2	–	0
West Liberty State	5	–	2	–	0	5	–	3	–	1
Glenville State	5	–	2	–	0	6	–	3	–	0
Bluefield State	3	–	4	–	0	3	–	4	–	0
West Virginia Tech	3	–	4	–	0	4	–	4	–	0
West Virginia Wesleyan	1	–	5	–	0	1	–	7	–	0
Concord	0	–	7	–	0	0	–	10	–	0
Shepherd *	0	–	3	–	0	2	–	7	–	0
$ – Conference champion; * – Did not qualify for conference standings Conference standings based on power ratings

1968 Wisconsin State University Conference football standings
	Conf.					Overall
Team	W		L		T	W		L		T
No. 13 Platteville State +	7	–	1	–	0	8	–	1	–	0
Oshkosh State +	7	–	1	–	0	8	–	2	–	0
Whitewater State	5	–	3	–	0	6	–	3	–	1
La Crosse State	5	–	3	–	0	5	–	5	–	0
Eau Claire State	3	–	3	–	2	3	–	4	–	2
River Falls State	2	–	5	–	1	3	–	6	–	1
Stout State	2	–	5	–	1	3	–	6	–	1
Stevens Point State	2	–	5	–	1	2	–	7	–	1
Superior State	0	–	7	–	1	0	–	9	–	1
+ – Conference co-champions; Rankings from NAIA poll

1968 NAIA independents football records
	Conf.			Overall
Team	W	L	T	W		L		T
No. 7 Doane		–		10	–	0	–	0
New Mexico Highlands		–		9	–	0	–	0
No. 15 Ferris State		–		7	–	0	–	1
No. 9 Cal Lutheran		–		9	–	1	–	0
No. 10 Emory and Henry		–		9	–	1	–	0
Indiana (PA)		–		9	–	1	–	0
No. 16 Austin		–		8	–	1	–	0
No. 11 Appalachian State		–		8	–	2	–	0
Boise State		–		8	–	2	–	0
No. 20 Carson–Newman		–		8	–	2	–	0
La Verne		–		7	–	2	–	0
Hillsdale		–		6	–	3	–	0
St. Mary of the Plains		–		6	–	4	–	0
Wheaton (IL)		–		5	–	4	–	0
Oklahoma Panhandle State		–		5	–	5	–	1
Eastern New Mexico		–		4	–	5	–	1
Simon Fraser		–		4	–	5	–	0
Southern Colorado State		–		4	–	6	–	0
Southwest State (MN)		–		3	–	5	–	0
Wofford		–		4	–	7	–	0
Westminster (UT)		–		3	–	6	–	0
Georgetown (KY)		–		2	–	6	–	0
Azusa Pacific		–		2	–	7	–	0
Kentucky State		–		2	–	7	–	0
Missouri Southern		–		2	–	8	–	0
[[{{{school}}}|Iowa Wesleyan]]		–		1	–	7	–	1
Rankings from NAIA poll

== Postseason ==
Semifinals; November 28–30, 1968
Northern State	0
Texas A&I*	20
Willamette	10
Troy State*	63

NAIA Championship Bowl; December 14, 1968; Montgomery, AL
Texas A&I	35
Troy State	43

== See also ==
- 1968 NCAA University Division football season
- 1968 NCAA College Division football season
