= Pecan Bowl =

Pecan Bowl (defunct)
- Stadium: Turnpike Stadium (1970); Memorial Stadium (1968–1969); Shotwell Stadium (1964–1967)
- Location: Arlington, Texas (1968–1970); Abilene, Texas (1964–1967); Orangeburg, South Carolina (1946–1947)
- Operated: 1964–1970; 1946–1947

The Pecan Bowl was the name of two college football bowl games played in two different eras. The initial version, in 1946 and 1947, was contested by historically black colleges and universities (HBCUs). The later version, held from 1964 through 1970, was an NCAA College Division regional final.

== History ==
=== HBCUs ===
The original Pecan Bowl was played in Orangeburg, South Carolina in 1946 and 1947. Both games were hosted (and won) by South Carolina State.

=== College Division ===
The Pecan Bowl name was revived for one of the four regional finals of the College Division, before it was subdivided into Division II and Division III in 1973. The game served as the championship for the Midwest Region from 1964 to 1970, at a time when there were no playoffs at any level of NCAA football. For the smaller colleges and universities, as for the major programs, the national champion was determined by polls conducted by the leading news wire services.

The bowl was played in Abilene, Texas from 1964 to 1967 and in Arlington, Texas, from 1968 to 1970. The intent for the Midwest game was to match the two best non-major teams from a region of eleven states: North Dakota, South Dakota, Minnesota, Iowa, Nebraska, Missouri, Kansas, Arkansas, Oklahoma, Texas, and Louisiana. The other three regional finals were the Tangerine (later Boardwalk), Grantland Rice, and Camellia bowls. Louisiana was moved to the Mideast Region in 1967, prior to the Grantland Rice Bowl relocating from Murfreesboro, Tennessee, to Baton Rouge.

The bowl name was selected through a public contest in 1964, and was considered appropriate as Abilene is in the Texas pecan belt. The game was played four times at Shotwell Stadium in Abilene, before moving to Arlington's Memorial Stadium in 1968. The last Pecan Bowl was held at Arlington's Turnpike Stadium, a minor-league baseball facility subsequently expanded to serve as the initial home of the Texas Rangers in 1972.

The inaugural game matched the State College of Iowa (now the University of Northern Iowa) and Lamar Tech (now Lamar University), and was won by State College. Two schools made three appearances in the Pecan Bowl, North Dakota State and Arkansas State, with both winning twice and losing once. They played each other in 1968, in a game won by top-ranked NDSU.

In March 1971 the Midwest regional final was moved from Arlington to Wichita Falls, Texas, where it was rebranded as the Pioneer Bowl.

== Game results ==
=== HBCUs ===
Date	Winner		Loser		Location	Attendance	Ref.
December 7, 1946	South Carolina State	13	Johnson C. Smith	6	Orangeburg, South Carolina	4,000	
December 13, 1947	South Carolina State	7	Allen	0	Orangeburg, South Carolina	3,000	

=== College Division ===
Date	Winning team		Losing team		Location	Attendance	Notes	Ref.
December 12, 1964	State College of Iowa	19	Lamar Tech	17	Abilene, Texas	7,500		
December 11, 1965	North Dakota State	20	Grambling	7	Abilene, Texas	8,500		
December 10, 1966	North Dakota	42	Parsons	24	Abilene, Texas	8,000		
December 16, 1967	Texas–Arlington	13	North Dakota State	0	Abilene, Texas	1,200		
December 14, 1968	North Dakota State	23	Arkansas State	14	Arlington, Texas	7,200		
December 13, 1969	Arkansas State	29	Drake	21	Arlington, Texas	7,500	notes	
December 12, 1970	Arkansas State	38	Central Missouri State	21	Arlington, Texas	9,500		

== See also ==
- List of college bowl games
