= Memorial Stadium (Arlington, Texas) =

University of Texas stadium in Arlington, Texas

- Location: Arlington, Texas
- Owner: University of Texas at Arlington
- Operator: University of Texas at Arlington Athletic Department
- Capacity: 10,022
- Surface: Natural grass
- Record attendance: 10,500

Construction
- Built: 1951
- Renovated: East stands, 1962
- Expanded: 1962
- Demolished: 1973
- Cost: US$60,000

Tenants
- UT Arlington Mavericks football Arlington Independent School District football

Memorial Stadium was a 10,022-seat stadium on the campus of The University of Texas at Arlington that served as the home site for the numerous teams that would become UT Arlington Mavericks as well as the Arlington Independent School District.

== Features ==
The steel and wood stadium opened for the 1951 football season and cost $60,000 to construct. Original capacity was 5,500. The stadium was oriented north-south from end zone to end zone with a playing field, west-side stands and a press box. In 1962, Memorial Stadium was expanded, reaching its final capacity of 10,022 with the addition of east-side stands. The stadium was located immediately west of the present Maverick Activities Center on what is now a field of flat recreational space and east of the nearby creek.

== History ==
The Arlington State College Rebels won the national junior college championship in 1956 and 1957. The school would rise to four-year status in 1959. UTA would play as an NCAA College Division Independent for a half decade before founding the Southland Conference and playing its first conference game as a University in 1964. The stadium would host the 1966 SLC co-champions and the 1967 outright champions, the first SLC team to post a perfect conference record. The 1967 team would finish the regular season ranked third in the UPI poll and beat North Dakota State, who was ranked second in that poll, 13–0 in the 1967 Pecan Bowl.

One of the more memorable games came in the 1968 season. In what was the equivalent of the Southland Conference championship game, UTA hosted the Arkansas State Indians with a 15-game home winning streak and Southland Conference championship on the line. UTA was sporting a 2–0 SLC mark while Arkansas State was 3–0 in the five-team league. A win for Arkansas State would give them the title outright, while a UTA victory would guarantee a share. UTA led 21–14 when Arkansas State scored a touchdown and added a two-point conversion to go up 22–21 with three minutes remaining. UTA would fumble a punt with under two minutes to seal the game.

Single game crowds
Date	Opponent	Attendance	Result
November 4, 1967	Abilene Christian^	10,500	34-7
November 18, 1967	Lamar*	10,500	16-10
October 10, 1968	East Texas State	10,500	41-30
October 1, 1966	East Texas State	10,000	27-10
November 12, 1966	Arkansas State^*	10,000	16-6
October 30, 1965	Arizona State College^	9,900	27-6
September 15, 1962	Southern Mississippi	9,800	7-28
November 8, 1969	Abilene Christian^	9,800	24-28
November 16, 1968	Arkansas State^	9,750	21-22
	^ Homecoming * Clinched SLC championship		

UTA teams played at Memorial Stadium until the conclusion of the 1969 season while Arlington high school teams played games there until the completion of the 1973 high school football season.

Memorial Stadium provided a home field advantage the program would never see again. From 1959 to 1969, the Rebels were 35-17-1, a winning percentage of .670. Included was a winning streak of 15 games that spanned from the last home game of 1965 to the last home game of 1968, the aforementioned Arkansas State game. Ironically, the longest losing streak came immediately after the winning streak as UTA would lose five in a row until winning the final game of the 1969 season, also the final game at Memorial.

As UTA prepared to move up the highest level of college football, officials at the University deemed Memorial too small and old to host higher level schools, which was needed to move up. The City of Arlington had just purchased Turnpike Stadium from Tarrant County, a minor league baseball stadium with the ability to host football games. The stadium was a lure for a major league team (eventually becoming the home of the Texas Rangers in 1972), but the City did not have a full-time tenant during the fall. Seeing a cost-effective solution, UTA would play their home games there beginning in 1970 leaving the UTA campus for the city-owned venue three miles away. UTA wouldn't play another home game on campus until the opening of Maverick Stadium in 1980, after Arlington Stadium was locked into a permanent baseball configuration.

After the last high school game of the 1973 season, Memorial Stadium was demolished. In 1975, the Maverick Activities Center opened east of the site, and provided UTA students recreational opportunities not previously available on campus.
