= Shotwell Stadium =

Football stadium in Abilene, Texas

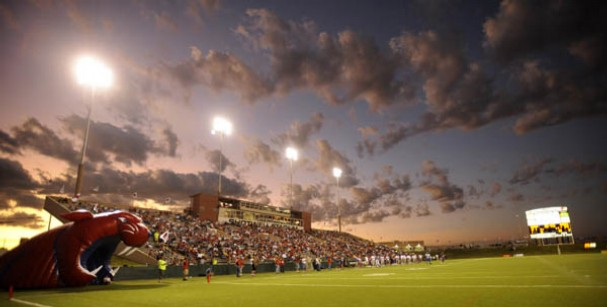
- Interactive map of Shotwell Stadium
- Former names: Public Schools Stadium (1959–1960)
- Location: Abilene, Texas
- Coordinates: 32°26′01.5″N 99°41′53.5″W
- Owner: Abilene Independent School District
- Capacity: 15,075
- Surface: Artificial turf

Construction
- Opened: 1959

Tenants
- Pecan Bowl (1964–68); Cooper Cougars; Abilene High Eagles; Abilene Christian Wildcats (1959–2016); McMurry Indians (1960–1973)

Shotwell Stadium is a stadium in Abilene, Texas. It was built in 1959, using Rice Stadium as a model. It was initially named the Public Schools Stadium. The first game played in the stadium was in the fall of 1959. Shortly after the first season, the stadium was renamed Shotwell Stadium, after P. E. Shotwell, a longtime football coach at Abilene High School.

== Size and uses ==
Shotwell Stadium is primarily used for American football and soccer. Each of the stadium's two concrete grandstands has a permanent seating capacity of 7,500 in an all-bleacher configuration. Several semi-permanent metal bleacher structures are located behind the north end zone, allowing for overflow seating in excess of the facility's 15,000 permanent seats. There are also standing room-only areas at the corners of the stadium, raising total capacity to approximately 20,000.

Shotwell Stadium is the home field of Abilene High School and Cooper High School. The Abilene High/Cooper High rivalry game is played here every year and always fills the stadium.

The stadium was long home to NCAA football. The Abilene Christian University Wildcats football team, currently a member of NCAA Division I FCS, played at Shotwell from 1959 through 2016. ACU opened a new on-campus stadium for the 2017 season.

Shotwell was for many years the "informal" designated site for the six-man football championships of the University Interscholastic League, which governs sports competition among public high schools in Texas (as the majority of six-man schools are in West Texas). In 2010, it was formally designated as the championship site. During 2013-2014 the title games moved to AT&T Stadium but returned in 2015 to Shotwell, as AT&T Stadium was unavailable due to a conflict with a Dallas Cowboys home game.

== Turf ==
Shotwell has used FieldTurf's artificial turf since 2012. The current Vertex Prime turf was installed in 2019, replacing the Revolution turf installed in 2012. The stadium's first artificial turf, SafePlay, was installed in 2002, replacing the natural grass turf that had been used since the stadium's opening.

== Lighting ==
Shotwell is equipped with Musco lighting, with two light standards on each side of the field. The current lighting system was installed following the collapse of one of the original lighting structures in 2009. The light fixtures were upgraded to LEDs in 2021.

The remnants of the stadium's original lighting design, which included four concrete columns on each grandstand, were ultimately removed as part of the 2023 press box reconstruction.

== History ==
The longest field goal in the history of all levels of organized football was kicked at Shotwell Stadium. On October 16, 1976, Ove Johansson, the Swedish-born placekicker for Abilene Christian University, kicked a 69-yard field goal against East Texas State in ACU's homecoming win against the Lions. This is currently the record for the longest recorded field goal in football history.

== Improvements ==
In the spring of 2002, the Abilene ISD Board of Trustees approved an exclusive vendor contract with Abtex Beverage Corporation, which provided funding for major renovations to the stadium. The initial upgrades included the installation of SafePlay turf, the latest generation of artificial playing surface for athletic fields. The new turf, drain system, access ramps, goalposts, and other changes were completed in late summer of 2002, in time for the 2002 football season. In August 2003, as a result of corporate sponsorship, a state-of-the-art scoreboard with an integrated color animation screen was installed on the north end. The south end scoreboard was upgraded and integrated with the new scoreboard. As a result, Shotwell Stadium became one of only a few high school stadiums in Texas with two scoreboards. Soon after, the parking lots were all paved and the dressing rooms were renovated. A new $479,080 40'-wide, 34'-tall scoreboard featuring a 14'x24' high-definition video screen that displays instant replays, AISD messages and advertising, complete with sound, was installed in 2007. It was installed on the north side of the stadium to replace the scoreboard placed four years prior, which had not functioned properly.
