= 1967 Idaho Vandals football team =

American college football season

1967 Idaho Vandals football
- Conference: Big Sky Conference
- Record: 4–6 (2–2 Big Sky)
- Head coach: Steve Musseau (3rd season)
- Home stadium: Neale Stadium

1967 Big Sky Conference football standings
	Conf.					Overall
Team	W		L		T	W		L		T
Montana State $	4	–	0	–	0	7	–	3	–	0
Montana	2	–	2	–	0	7	–	3	–	0
Weber State	2	–	2	–	0	6	–	4	–	0
Idaho	2	–	2	–	0	4	–	6	–	0
Idaho State	0	–	4	–	0	1	–	9	–	0
$ – Conference champion

The 1967 Idaho Vandals football team represented the University of Idaho in the 1967 NCAA College Division football season. The Vandals were led by third-year head coach Steve Musseau and played a third season in the Big Sky Conference. Two home games were played on campus at Neale Stadium in Moscow, with another in Boise at old Bronco Stadium at Boise Junior College. The Vandals were 4–6 (2–2 in Big Sky, tied for second) and were outscored 332 to 156.

After fullback Ray McDonald won the NCAA rushing title in 1966, the Vandals were involuntarily dropped by the NCAA to the College Division in 1967. After two seasons, Idaho returned to the University Division in 1969.

Entering November at 4–3, Idaho lost its last three games, all on the road; at Weber State and non-conference blowout losses at Washington State (14–52) and Houston (6–77). The latter was at the two-year-old Astrodome and was Idaho's first game on artificial turf.

Although Musseau's 13–17 (.433) record was better than each of the previous eight head coaches, pressure from alumni and boosters forced his resignation, despite a signed petition by the Vandal football players that he remain for a fourth year. He stayed with the university in 1968, but outside the athletic department in a fund-raising role under the university president.

Of the five assistant coaches, only first-year line coach Ed Troxel was retained for 1968. Formerly at Borah High School in Boise, he also coached track and became the Vandals' head track coach in May 1970. Troxel was an assistant coach in football at Idaho through 1973, then was the head coach for four seasons (1974–1977).

== Schedule ==
Date	Time	Opponent	Site	TV	Result	Attendance	Source
September 16	8:00 pm	at Pacific (CA)*	Pacific Memorial Stadium; Stockton, CA		L 6–42	10,000	
September 23	8:00 pm	at Fresno State*	Ratcliffe Stadium; Fresno, CA		W 30–14	5,500	
September 30	12:30 pm	vs. Idaho State	old Bronco Stadium; Boise, ID (rivalry)		W 16–6	10,500	
October 7	1:30 pm	Montana State^{†}	Neale Stadium; Moscow, ID		L 14–41	16,500	
October 14	11:05 am	at Montana	Dornblaser Field; Missoula, MT (rivalry)	KREM	W 19–14	7,200	
October 21	1:30 pm	at Oregon*	Autzen Stadium; Eugene, OR		L 6–31	16,000	
October 28	1:30 pm	Parsons*	Neale Stadium; Moscow, ID		W 28–27	5,000	
November 4	12:30 pm	at Weber State	Wildcat Stadium; Ogden, UT		L 17–28	8,100	
November 11	1:30 pm	at Washington State*	Rogers Field; Pullman, WA (rivalry)		L 14–52	15,100	
November 18	5:30 pm	at Houston*	Houston Astrodome; Houston, TX		L 6–77	40,050–40,464	
*Non-conference game; ^{†}Homecoming; All times are in Pacific time

== Roster ==
1967 Idaho Vandals football team roster
Players
Coaches
Offense

Pos.	#	Name	Class
QB	11	Steve Olson	So
QB	14	Paul Gentle	Sr
QB	18	Steve Garman	Jr
RB	20	Pat Davidson	Sr
RB, P	34	Rudy Linterman	So
RB	36	Ron Roberts	So
RB	42	Rob Young	Jr
RB	43	Jim Pearsall	Jr
RB	44	Jeff Guillory	So
C	51	Gary Atkinson	Jr
C	52	Andy Streumpf
C	54	Dick Chatfield	Jr
RG	61	Karl Kleinkopf	Sr
G	62	Tom Nelson	So
LG	67	Steve Ulrich	Sr
G	69	Danny Eichhorn
RT	71	Jim Thiemens	Sr
OT	72	Brian Evans	Sr
OT	77	Bob Haney	So
LT	79	Gary Grove	Jr
WR	81	Rich Toney	Sr
WR	84	Jerry Hendren	So
TE	89	Gordon DeWaard	So

Defense

Pos.	#	Name	Class
DB, QB	10	Jim Wickboldt	So
S	16	Wayne Marquess	So
DB	20	Doug Clark	Jr
CB	21	Dick Nelson	Jr
DB	22	John Forland
S	24	Byron Strickland	Sr
CB	27	Kenny Dotson	Jr
SS, PK	36	Darrell Danielson	Sr
LB	40	Art Chubb
DE	45	Mike Eugene
LB	50	Chris Schuh
LB	55	Joe Tasby	So
MG	60	Tom Carson	So
LB	65	Roosevelt Owens	So
DT	66	Ed Clauson	So
DT	70	Brock Jackley	So
LB	73	Ed Schmidt
MG	74	Vic Mann	Sr
DT	78	John Jacobson	So
DE	80	John Knowles	So
DT	82	Doug Whidder
DE	83	Bill Kluth
DE	85	Kurt Miller	So
S	86	George Smith	Sr
S	88	Jim Fields	So

Special teams

Pos.	#	Name	Class
P	34	Rudy Linterman	So
PK	36	Darrell Danielson	Sr

Head coach

- Steve Musseau (3rd year)

Coordinators/assistant coaches

- Billy Hughes (DB)
- George Davis (DL)
- Herb Adams (OB)
- Ed Troxel (OL)
- Norm Thomas
  (Freshmen team)

Legend

- (C) Team captain
- (S) Suspended
- (I) Ineligible
- Injured
- Redshirt

== All-conference ==
Center Steve Ulrich was a repeat selection to the all-conference team, joined by tackle Jim Thiemens, running back Jim Pearsall, and cornerback Ken Dotson. Second team (honorable mention) picks were quarterback Steve Garman, wide receiver Jerry Hendren, and linebacker Roosevelt Owens.

== NFL draft ==
Two sophomores from the 1967 Vandals were selected in the 1970 NFL draft, which lasted 17 rounds (442 selections).

Player	Position	Round	Overall	Franchise
Jerry Hendren	WR	4th	89	Denver Broncos
Bob Haney	T	15th	383	Detroit Lions
