= 1968 Weber State Wildcats football team =

American college football season

1968 Weber State Wildcats football

Big Sky co-champion
- Conference: Big Sky Conference
- Record: 7–2 (3–1 Big Sky)
- Head coach: Sark Arslanian (4th season)
- Home stadium: Wildcat Stadium

1968 Big Sky Conference football standings
	Conf.					Overall
Team	W		L		T	W		L		T
Weber State +	3	–	1	–	0	7	–	2	–	0
Montana State +	3	–	1	–	0	6	–	4	–	0
Idaho +	3	–	1	–	0	5	–	5	–	0
Idaho State	1	–	3	–	0	4	–	5	–	0
Montana	0	–	4	–	0	2	–	7	–	0
+ – Conference co-champions

The 1968 Weber State Wildcats football team represented Weber State College (now known as Weber State University) as a member of the Big Sky Conference during the 1968 NCAA College Division football season. Led by fourth-year head coach Sark Arslanian, the Wildcats compiled an overall record of 7–2, with a mark of 3–1 in conference play, and finished as Big Sky co-champion.

== Schedule ==
Date	Opponent	Rank	Site	Result	Attendance	Source
September 14	at South Dakota State*		Alumni Stadium; Brookings, SD	W 27–12	7,000	
September 28	at Northern Arizona*	No. 12	Lumberjack Stadium; Flagstaff, AZ	W 21–14	6,000	
October 5	Boise State*	No. 6	Wildcat Stadium; Ogden, UT	W 44–3	12,923	
October 12	at Portland State*	No. 7	Civic Stadium; Portland, OR	W 28–12	1,838	
October 19	Montana State	No. 7	Wildcat Stadium; Ogden, UT	W 20–14	9,200	
October 26	Idaho State^{†}	No. 6	Wildcat Stadium; Ogden, UT	W 23–16	10,723	
November 2	at Idaho	No. 5	Neale Stadium; Moscow, ID	L 42–50	10,005	
November 9	at Montana	No. 11	Dornblaser Field; Missoula, MT	W 20–16	3,000	
November 16	Valley State*	No. 10	Wildcat Stadium; Ogden, UT	L 18–29	6,300–6,600	
*Non-conference game; ^{†}Homecoming; Rankings from AP Poll released prior to the game
