= 1967 Idaho State Bengals football team =

American college football season

1967 Idaho State Bengals football
- Conference: Big Sky Conference
- Record: 1–9 (0–4 Big Sky)
- Head coach: Leo McKillip (2nd season)
- Home stadium: Spud Bowl

1967 Big Sky Conference football standings
	Conf.					Overall
Team	W		L		T	W		L		T
Montana State $	4	–	0	–	0	7	–	3	–	0
Montana	2	–	2	–	0	7	–	3	–	0
Weber State	2	–	2	–	0	6	–	4	–	0
Idaho	2	–	2	–	0	4	–	6	–	0
Idaho State	0	–	4	–	0	1	–	9	–	0
$ – Conference champion

The 1967 Idaho State Bengals football team represented Idaho State University as a member of the Big Sky Conference during the 1967 NCAA College Division football season. Led by second-year head coach Leo McKillip, the Bengals compiled an overall record of 1–9, with a mark of 0–4 in conference play, and finished fifth in the Big Sky.

== Schedule ==
Date	Opponent	Site	Result	Attendance	Source
September 16	at New Mexico*	University Stadium; Albuquerque, NM	L 3–24	17,042	
September 23	South Dakota State*	Spud Bowl; Pocatello, ID	L 22–24	3,500	
September 30	vs. Idaho	Bronco Stadium; Boise, ID (rivalry)	L 6–16	10,500	
October 7	at Tulsa*	Skelly Stadium; Tulsa, OK	L 0–58	23,500	
October 14	Montana State	Spud Bowl; Pocatello, ID	L 7–24	6,500	
October 21	at Montana	Dornblaser Field; Missoula, MT	L 0–20	9,000	
October 28	Weber State	Spud Bowl; Pocatello, ID	L 7–19	4,000	
November 4	at Hawaii*	Honolulu Stadium; Honolulu, HI	L 6–21	8,000–14,500	
November 11	at Parsons*	Blum Stadium; Fairfield, IA	L 0–24	12,000	
November 23	at Portland State*	Civic Stadium; Portland, OR	W 22–21	9,500	
*Non-conference game
