= 1967 Montana State Bobcats football team =

American college football season

1967 Montana State Bobcats football

Big Sky champion
- Conference: Big Sky Conference
- Record: 7–3 (4–0 Big Sky)
- Head coach: Jim Sweeney (5th season)
- Home stadium: Gatton Field

1967 Big Sky Conference football standings
| | Conf. | | | | | Overall |
| Team | W | | L | | T | W | | L | | T |
|---|---|---|---|---|---|---|---|---|---|---|
| Montana State $ | 4 | – | 0 | – | 0 | 7 | – | 3 | – | 0 |
| Montana | 2 | – | 2 | – | 0 | 7 | – | 3 | – | 0 |
| Weber State | 2 | – | 2 | – | 0 | 6 | – | 4 | – | 0 |
| Idaho | 2 | – | 2 | – | 0 | 4 | – | 6 | – | 0 |
| Idaho State | 0 | – | 4 | – | 0 | 1 | – | 9 | – | 0 |
$ – Conference champion

The 1967 Montana State Bobcats football team was an American football team that represented Montana State University in the Big Sky Conference during the 1967 NCAA College Division football season. In their fifth and final season under head coach Jim Sweeney, the Bobcats compiled a 7–3 record (4–0 against Big Sky opponents) and won the conference championship.

== Schedule ==
| Date | Opponent | Rank | Site | Result | Attendance | Source |
|---|---|---|---|---|---|---|
| September 9 | vs. North Dakota State* | | Memorial Stadium; Great Falls, MT | L 6–24 | 8,000–10,000 | |
| September 16 | at West Texas State* | | Buffalo Bowl; Canyon, TX | L 26–35 | 15,500 | |
| September 23 | Portland State* | | Gatton Field; Bozeman, MT | W 52–7 | 8,500 | |
| September 30 | at Fresno State* | No. 10 | Ratcliffe Stadium; Fresno, CA | W 21–20 | 7,678–8,000 | |
| October 7 | at Idaho | | Neale Stadium; Moscow, ID | W 41–14 | 16,500 | |
| October 14 | at Idaho State | | Spud Bowl; Pocatello, ID | W 24–7 | 6,500 | |
| October 21 | Weber State^{†} | | Gatton Field; Bozeman, MT | W 21–6 | 9,500 | |
| October 28 | North Dakota* | | Gatton Field; Bozeman, MT | W 20–16 | 4,500–4,600 | |
| November 4 | Montana | | Gatton Field; Bozeman, MT (rivalry) | W 14–8 | 10,200–10,500 | |
| November 18 | at No. 1 San Diego State* | | San Diego Stadium; San Diego, CA | L 3–14 | 47,125 | |
*Non-conference game; ^{†}Homecoming; Rankings from AP Poll released prior to the game
