= 1967 Montana Grizzlies football team =

American college football season

1967 Montana Grizzlies football
- Conference: Big Sky Conference
- Record: 7–3 (2–2 Big Sky)
- Head coach: Jack Swarthout (1st season)
- Captains: Larry Huggins; Ed Steiner
- Home stadium: Dornblaser Field

1967 Big Sky Conference football standings
	Conf.					Overall
Team	W		L		T	W		L		T
Montana State $	4	–	0	–	0	7	–	3	–	0
Montana	2	–	2	–	0	7	–	3	–	0
Weber State	2	–	2	–	0	6	–	4	–	0
Idaho	2	–	2	–	0	4	–	6	–	0
Idaho State	0	–	4	–	0	1	–	9	–	0
$ – Conference champion

The 1967 Montana Grizzlies football team represented the University of Montana in the 1967 NCAA College Division football season as a member of the Big Sky Conference (Big Sky). The Grizzlies were led by first-year head coach Jack Swarthout, played their home games at Dornblaser Field, and finished the season with a record of seven wins and three losses (7–3, 2–2 Big Sky, second).

== Schedule ==
Date	Opponent	Site	Result	Attendance	Source
September 16	at North Dakota*	Memorial Stadium; Grand Forks, ND	W 19–14	8,100	
September 23	vs. South Dakota*	Daylis Stadium; Billings, MT	W 7–3	6,000	
September 30	at Weber State	Wildcat Stadium; Ogden, UT	W 13–12	7,300	
October 7	Pacific (CA)*	Dornblaser Field; Missoula, MT	W 21–7	7,000–7,800	
October 14	Idaho	Dornblaser Field; Missoula, MT (rivalry)	L 14–19	7,200	
October 21	Idaho State	Dornblaser Field; Missoula, MT	W 20–0	9,000	
October 28	Northern Arizona*	Dornblaser Field; Missoula, MT	W 10–7	6,500	
November 4	at Montana State	Gatton Field; Bozeman, MT (rivalry)	L 8–14	10,200–10,500	
November 11	at Utah State*	Romney Stadium; Logan, UT	L 14–20	8,396–8,400	
November 18	at Portland State*	Civic Stadium; Portland, OR	W 55–7	1,200	
*Non-conference game

== Coaching staff ==
- Jack Elway (AHC)
- Bill Betcher (line)
- Wally Brown (line)
- Pinky Erickson (LB, E)
