= 1968 Montana State Bobcats football team =

American college football season

1968 Montana State Bobcats football

Big Sky co-champion
- Conference: Big Sky Conference
- Record: 6–4 (3–1 Big Sky)
- Head coach: Tom Parac (1st season)
- Home stadium: Gatton Field

1968 Big Sky Conference football standings
	Conf.					Overall
Team	W		L		T	W		L		T
Weber State +	3	–	1	–	0	7	–	2	–	0
Montana State +	3	–	1	–	0	6	–	4	–	0
Idaho +	3	–	1	–	0	5	–	5	–	0
Idaho State	1	–	3	–	0	4	–	5	–	0
Montana	0	–	4	–	0	2	–	7	–	0
+ – Conference co-champions

The 1968 Montana State Bobcats football team was an American football team that represented Montana State University in the Big Sky Conference during the 1968 NCAA College Division football season. In their first season under head coach Tom Parac, the Bobcats compiled a 6–4 record (3–1 against Big Sky opponents) and tied for the conference championship.

== Schedule ==
Date	Opponent	Site	Result	Attendance	Source
September 14	vs. Idaho	Memorial Stadium; Great Falls, MT	W 17–14	7,500–8,500	
September 21	at Portland State*	Civic Stadium; Portland, OR	W 17–6	1,838	
September 28	No. 1 San Diego State*	Gatton Field; Bozeman, MT	L 22–34	9,000	
October 5	West Texas State*	Gatton Field; Bozeman, MT	L 20–35	7,000	
October 12	Idaho State^{†}	Gatton Field; Bozeman, MT	W 31–14	9,000	
October 19	at No. 7 Weber State	Wildcat Stadium; Ogden, UT	L 14–20	9,200	
October 26	Northern Arizona*	Gatton Field; Bozeman, MT	W 20–15	5,000	
November 2	at Montana	Dornblaser Field; Missoula, MT (rivalry)	W 29–24	12,000	
November 9	at North Dakota*	Memorial Stadium; Grand Forks, ND	W 41–7	1,500–2,100	
November 16	at Fresno State*	Ratcliffe Stadium; Fresno, CA	L 16–37	6,500–7,245	
*Non-conference game; ^{†}Homecoming; Rankings from AP Poll released prior to the game
