= 1968 Texas Southern Tigers football team =

American college football season

1968 Texas Southern Tigers football

SWAC co-champion
- Conference: Southwestern Athletic Conference
- Record: 6–4 (6–1 SWAC)
- Head coach: Clifford Paul (4th season)
- Home stadium: Astrodome; Jeppesen Stadium; Rice Stadium

1968 Southwestern Athletic Conference football standings
	Conf.					Overall
Team	W		L		T	W		L		T
No. 3 Alcorn A&M +	6	–	1	–	0	8	–	1	–	0
Grambling +	6	–	1	–	0	9	–	2	–	0
Texas Southern +	6	–	1	–	0	6	–	4	–	0
Arkansas AM&N	4	–	3	–	0	5	–	5	–	0
Southern	3	–	4	–	0	4	–	6	–	0
Prairie View A&M	2	–	5	–	0	4	–	6	–	0
Jackson State	1	–	6	–	0	3	–	6	–	0
Wiley	0	–	7	–	0	2	–	8	–	0
+ – Conference co-champions; Rankings from NAIA poll

The 1968 Texas Southern Tigers football team was an American football team that represented Texas Southern University as a member of the Southwestern Athletic Conference (SWAC) during the 1968 NAIA football season. Led by fourth-year head coach Clifford Paul, the Tigers compiled an overall record of 6–4, with a mark of 6–1 in conference play, and finished as SWAC co-champion.

== Schedule ==
Date	Opponent	Site	Result	Attendance	Source
September 21	Southern	Rice Stadium; Houston, TX	W 6–3		
September 28	vs. Wiley	Public School Stadium; Galveston, TX	W 42–5		
October 5	at Tennessee State*	Hale Stadium; Nashville, TN	L 10–11	9,500	
October 12	at San Diego State*	San Diego Stadium; San Diego, CA	L 23–42	38,305	
October 19	at Alcorn A&M	Henderson Stadium; Lorman, MS	W 35–21		
November 2	Grambling	Astrodome; Houston, TX	L 18–28	35,465	
November 9	at Jackson State	Alumni Field; Jackson, MS	W 14–0		
November 16	at Arkansas AM&N	Pumphrey Stadium; Pine Bluff, AR	W 17–11		
November 23	Prairie View A&M	Jeppesen Stadium; Houston, TX (rivalry)	W 22–14		
November 30	vs. Florida A&M*	Tampa Stadium; Tampa, FL	L 7–20	16,000	
*Non-conference game
