= 1968 San Francisco State Gators football team =

American college football season

1968 San Francisco State Gators football
- Conference: Far Western Conference
- Record: 5–5 (3–3 FWC)
- Head coach: Vic Rowen (8th season)
- Home stadium: Cox Stadium

1968 Far Western Conference football standings
	Conf.					Overall
Team	W		L		T	W		L		T
No. 16 AP / #10 UPI Humboldt State $	6	–	0	–	0	10	–	1	–	0
Sacramento State	4	–	2	–	0	8	–	3	–	0
UC Davis	3	–	3	–	0	5	–	4	–	0
San Francisco State	3	–	3	–	0	5	–	5	–	0
Chico State	2	–	4	–	0	5	–	5	–	0
Cal State Hayward	1	–	4	–	1	5	–	4	–	1
Nevada	1	–	4	–	1	3	–	6	–	1
$ – Conference champion; Rankings from small college polls

The 1968 San Francisco State Gators football team represented San Francisco State College—now known as San Francisco State University—as a member of the Far Western Conference (FWC) during the 1968 NCAA College Division football season. Led by eighth-year head coach Vic Rowen, San Francisco State compiled an overall record of 5–5 with a mark of 3–3 in conference play, tying for third place in the FWC. For the season the team was outscored by its opponents 195 to 125. The Gators played home games at Cox Stadium in San Francisco.

== Schedule ==
Date	Opponent	Site	Result	Attendance	Source
September 21	Santa Clara*	Cox Stadium; San Francisco, CA	W 19–7	5,000	
September 28	at Cal Poly*	Mustang Stadium; San Luis Obispo, CA	L 0–27	5,850	
October 5	Chico State	Cox Stadium; San Francisco, CA	W 21–19	2,000	
October 12	at Cal State Hayward	Pioneer Stadium; Hayward, CA	W 10–7	4,500–7,200	
October 19	Sacramento State	Cox Stadium; San Francisco, CA	W 14–13	3,500	
October 26	at Humboldt State	Redwood Bowl; Arcata, CA	L 20–37	8,250	
November 2	UC Davis	Cox Stadium; San Francisco, CA	L 6–30	500	
November 9	Southern Oregon*	Cox Stadium; San Francisco, CA	W 14–6	200	
November 16	at Nevada	Mackay Stadium; Reno, NV	L 7–21	1,000–2,000	
November 23	at Long Beach State*	Veterans Stadium; Long Beach, CA	L 14–28	700	
*Non-conference game
