= 1968 Idaho State Bengals football team =

American college football season

1968 Idaho State Bengals football
- Conference: Big Sky Conference
- Record: 4–5 (1–3 Big Sky)
- Head coach: Ed Cavanaugh (1st season)
- Home stadium: Spud Bowl

1968 Big Sky Conference football standings
	Conf.					Overall
Team	W		L		T	W		L		T
Weber State +	3	–	1	–	0	7	–	2	–	0
Montana State +	3	–	1	–	0	6	–	4	–	0
Idaho +	3	–	1	–	0	5	–	5	–	0
Idaho State	1	–	3	–	0	4	–	5	–	0
Montana	0	–	4	–	0	2	–	7	–	0
+ – Conference co-champions

The 1968 Idaho State Bengals football team represented Idaho State University as a member of the Big Sky Conference during the 1968 NCAA College Division football season. Led by first-year head coach Ed Cavanaugh, the Bengals compiled an overall record of 4–5, with a mark of 1–3 in conference play, and finished fourth in the Big Sky.

== Schedule ==
Date	Opponent	Site	Result	Attendance	Source
September 14	Portland State*	Spud Bowl; Pocatello, ID	W 52–30	4,500	
September 21	at Fresno State*	Ratcliffe Stadium; Fresno, CA	W 38–23	8,615	
September 28	Idaho	Spud Bowl; Pocatello, ID (rivalry)	L 15–35	7,200	
October 12	at Montana State	Gatton Field; Bozeman, MT	L 14–31	9,000	
October 19	Montana	Spud Bowl; Pocatello, ID	W 23–13	6,000	
October 26	at No. 6 Weber State	Wildcat Stadium; Ogden, UT	L 16–23	10,723	
November 2	at Boise State*	Bronco Stadium; Boise, ID	L 20–27	7,500	
November 9	at South Dakota State*	Alumni Stadium; Brookings, SD	L 22–41	1,200	
November 16	at Nebraska–Omaha*	Caniglia Field; Omaha, NE	W 16–13	1,500	
*Non-conference game; Rankings from AP Poll released prior to the game
