= 1968 North Dakota Fighting Sioux football team =

American college football season

1968 North Dakota Fighting Sioux football
- Conference: North Central Conference
- Record: 3–5 (3–3 NCC)
- Head coach: Jerry Olson (1st season)
- Home stadium: Memorial Stadium

1968 North Central Conference football standings
	Conf.					Overall
Team	W		L		T	W		L		T
No. 1 North Dakota State $	6	–	0	–	0	10	–	0	–	0
No. 8 South Dakota	5	–	1	–	0	9	–	1	–	0
State College of Iowa	3	–	3	–	0	5	–	5	–	0
North Dakota	3	–	3	–	0	3	–	5	–	0
South Dakota State	2	–	4	–	0	4	–	6	–	0
Morningside	2	–	4	–	0	4	–	5	–	0
Augustana (SD)	0	–	6	–	0	2	–	7	–	0
$ – Conference champion; Rankings from AP small college poll

The 1968 North Dakota Fighting Sioux football team, also known as the Nodaks, was an American football team that represented the University of North Dakota in the North Central Conference (NCC) during the 1968 NCAA College Division football season. In its first year under head coach Jerry Olson, the team compiled a 3–5 record (3–3 against NCC opponents), finished in fourth place out of seven teams in the NCC, and was outscored by a total of 179 to 148. The team played its home games at Memorial Stadium in Grand Forks, North Dakota.

== Schedule ==
Date	Opponent	Site	Result	Attendance	Source
September 14	vs. Montana*	Daylis Stadium; Billings, MT	L 10–37	7,000	
September 21	State College of Iowa	Memorial Stadium; Grand Forks, ND	L 10–14	8,000	
September 28	South Dakota	Memorial Stadium; Grand Forks, ND (Sitting Bull Trophy)	L 16–17	5,000–5,500	
October 12	at South Dakota State	Coughlin–Alumni Stadium; Brookings, SD	W 21–16	10,500	
October 19	No. 2 North Dakota State	Memorial Stadium; Grand Forks, ND (Nickel Trophy)	L 8–14	9,350–9,750	
October 26	at Augustana (SD)	Howard Wood Field; Sioux Falls, SD	W 39–20	7,000	
November 2	at Morningside	Sioux City, IA	W 37–20	3,500	
November 9	Montana State*	Memorial Stadium; Grand Forks, ND	L 7–41	1,500–2,100	
*Non-conference game; Rankings from AP Poll released prior to the game
