= 1968 Valley State Matadors football team =

American college football season

1968 Valley State Matadors football
- Conference: California Collegiate Athletic Association
- Record: 5–4 (1–3 CCAA)
- Head coach: Sam Winningham (7th season)
- Home stadium: Birmingham High School

1968 California Collegiate Athletic Association football standings
	Conf.					Overall
Team	W		L		T	W		L		T
No. 18 Fresno State $	4	–	0	–	0	7	–	4	–	0
Cal Poly	2	–	2	–	0	7	–	3	–	0
Cal State Los Angeles	2	–	2	–	0	6	–	3	–	0
Valley State	1	–	3	–	0	5	–	4	–	0
Long Beach State	1	–	3	–	0	3	–	7	–	0
$ – Conference champion; Rankings from UPI small college poll

The 1968 Valley State Matadors football team represented San Fernando Valley State College—now known as California State University, Northridge—as a member of the California Collegiate Athletic Association (CCAA) during the 1968 NCAA College Division football season. Led by Sam Winningham in his seventh and final season as head coach, Valley State compiled an overall record of 5–4 with a mark of 1–3 in conference play, tying for fourth place in the CCAA. This was the second straight winning season for the Matadors. Valley State played home games at Birmingham High School in Van Nuys, California.

== Schedule ==
Date	Opponent	Site	Result	Attendance	Source
September 28	Whittier*	Birmingham High School; Van Nuys, CA	L 7–13	5,300	
October 5	Long Beach State	Birmingham High School; Van Nuys, CA	W 21–20	5,413	
October 12	at Fresno State	Ratcliffe Stadium; Fresno, CA	L 12–35	6,346–6,500	
October 19	at Northern Arizona*	Lumberjack Stadium; Flagstaff, AZ	W 21–20	7,900	
October 26	at Cal Poly	Mustang Stadium; San Luis Obispo, CA	L 21–31	6,600	
November 2	Portland State*	Birmingham High School; Van Nuys, CA	W 62–20	6,300	
November 9	at Cal Poly Pomona*	Kellogg Field; Pomona, CA	W 31–17	2,000–2,500	
November 16	at Weber State*	Wildcat Stadium; Ogden, UT	W 29–18	6,300–6,600	
November 23	Cal State Los Angeles	Birmingham High School; Van Nuys, CA	L 27–42	7,200–7,400	
*Non-conference game
