= 1968 Arkansas AM&N Golden Lions football team =

American college football season

1968 Arkansas AM&N Golden Lions football
- Conference: Southwestern Athletic Conference
- Record: 5–5 (4–3 SWAC)
- Head coach: Vannette W. Johnson (7th season)
- Home stadium: Pumphrey Stadium

1968 Southwestern Athletic Conference football standings
	Conf.					Overall
Team	W		L		T	W		L		T
No. 3 Alcorn A&M +	6	–	1	–	0	8	–	1	–	0
Grambling +	6	–	1	–	0	9	–	2	–	0
Texas Southern +	6	–	1	–	0	6	–	4	–	0
Arkansas AM&N	4	–	3	–	0	5	–	5	–	0
Southern	3	–	4	–	0	4	–	6	–	0
Prairie View A&M	2	–	5	–	0	4	–	6	–	0
Jackson State	1	–	6	–	0	3	–	6	–	0
Wiley	0	–	7	–	0	2	–	8	–	0
+ – Conference co-champions; Rankings from NAIA poll

The 1968 Arkansas AM&N Golden Lions football team represented the Arkansas Agricultural, Mechanical and Normal College (now known as the University of Arkansas at Pine Bluff) as a member of the Southwestern Athletic Conference (SWAC) during the 1968 NCAA College Division football season. Led by seventh-year head coach Vannette W. Johnson, the Golden Lions compiled an overall record of 5–5, with a conference record of 4–3, and finished fourth in the SWAC.

== Schedule ==
Date	Opponent	Site	Result	Attendance	Source
September 21	Mississippi Valley State*	Pumphrey Stadium; Pine Bluff, AR	W 49–6		
September 28	at Lincoln (MO)*	LU Stadium; Jefferson City, MO	L 8–21		
October 5	at Jackson State	Alumni Field; Jackson, MS	W 15–14	6,445	
October 12	Southern	Pumphrey Stadium; Pine Bluff, AR	W 24–14		
October 19	at Wiley	Maverick Stadium; Marshall, TX	W 25–19		
October 26	at Prairie View A&M	Edward L. Blackshear Field; Prairie View, TX	W 9–0		
November 2	Alcorn A&M	Pumphrey Stadium; Pine Bluff, AR	L 0–53		
November 9	at Grambling	Grambling Stadium; Grambling, LA	L 20–46		
November 16	Texas Southern	Pumphrey Stadium; Pine Bluff, AR	L 11–17		
November 23	Bishop*	Pumphrey Stadium; Pine Bluff, AR	L 21–24		
*Non-conference game
