= 1968 Northern Arizona Lumberjacks football team =

American college football season

1968 Northern Arizona Lumberjacks football
- Conference: Independent
- Record: 6–4
- Head coach: Andy MacDonald (4th season)
- Home stadium: Lumberjack Stadium

1968 NCAA College Division independents football records
	Conf.			Overall
Team	W	L	T	W		L		T
No. 2 San Diego State		–		9	–	0	–	1
No. 3 Chattanooga		–		9	–	1	–	0
Indiana State		–		9	–	1	–	0
Indiana (PA)		–		9	–	1	–	0
Nevada Southern		–		8	–	1	–	0
Ashland		–		8	–	2	–	0
No. 7 Eastern Michigan		–		8	–	2	–	0
Lincoln (MO)		–		8	–	2	–	0
St. Norbert		–		6	–	2	–	1
Tennessee State		–		6	–	2	–	1
UC Riverside		–		6	–	2	–	1
Hawaii		–		7	–	3	–	0
No. 14 Tampa		–		7	–	3	–	0
No. 17 Akron		–		7	–	3	–	1
Northeastern		–		6	–	3	–	0
Southern Illinois		–		6	–	3	–	0
Cortland		–		5	–	3	–	0
Boston University		–		5	–	3	–	1
Northern Arizona		–		6	–	4	–	0
Pacific (CA)		–		6	–	4	–	0
Samford		–		6	–	4	–	0
Northern Michigan		–		5	–	4	–	0
Parsons		–		5	–	4	–	0
Wheaton (IL)		–		5	–	4	–	0
Drake		–		5	–	5	–	0
UC Santa Barbara		–		4	–	4	–	1
Santa Clara		–		4	–	5	–	0
Portland State		–		4	–	6	–	0
Illinois College		–		2	–	4	–	2
Wayne State (MI)		–		3	–	6	–	0
Wabash		–		3	–	6	–	0
Colorado College		–		2	–	6	–	0
Kentucky State		–		2	–	7	–	0
Milwaukee		–		2	–	7	–	0
Lake Forest		–		2	–	8	–	0
Northern Illinois		–		2	–	8	–	0
Mississippi Valley State		–		1	–	7	–	0
UC San Diego		–		0	–	7	–	0
Rose Poly		–		0	–	8	–	0
Cal Poly Pomona		–		0	–	10	–	0
Rankings from AP small college poll

The 1968 Northern Arizona Lumberjacks football team represented Northern Arizona University as an independent during the 1968 NCAA College Division football season. Led by fourth-year head coach Andy MacDonald, the Lumberjacks compiled an overall record of 6–4.

== Schedule ==
Date	Opponent	Site	Result	Attendance	Source
September 14	at Drake	Drake Stadium; Des Moines, IA	L 15–30	5,000	
September 21	Long Beach State	Lumberjack Stadium; Flagstaff, AZ	W 26–20	7,000	
September 28	No. 12 Weber State	Lumberjack Stadium; Flagstaff, AZ	L 14–21	6,000	
October 5	at Nebraska–Omaha	Johnny Rosenblatt Stadium; Omaha, NE	W 7–6	879	
October 12	at Northern Illinois	Huskie Stadium; DeKalb, IL	W 43–14	12,162	
October 19	Valley State	Lumberjack Stadium; Flagstaff, AZ	L 20–21	7,900	
October 26	at Montana State	Gatton Field; Bozeman, MT	L 15–20	5,000	
November 2	Hiram Scott	Lumberjack Stadium; Flagstaff, AZ	W 37–7	7,200	
November 9	at Eastern New Mexico	Greyhound Stadium; Portales, NM	W 35–17	4,000	
November 16	Montana	Lumberjack Stadium; Flagstaff, AZ	W 18–0	2,400–4,000	
Rankings from AP Poll released prior to the game
