= 1968 UC Davis Aggies football team =

American college football season

1968 UC Davis Aggies football
- Conference: Far Western Conference
- Record: 5–4 (3–3 FWC)
- Head coach: Herb Schmalenberger (6th season)
- Captains: George Bauslaugh; Richard Tortosa
- Home stadium: Toomey Field

1968 Far Western Conference football standings
	Conf.					Overall
Team	W		L		T	W		L		T
No. 16 AP / #10 UPI Humboldt State $	6	–	0	–	0	10	–	1	–	0
Sacramento State	4	–	2	–	0	8	–	3	–	0
UC Davis	3	–	3	–	0	5	–	4	–	0
San Francisco State	3	–	3	–	0	5	–	5	–	0
Chico State	2	–	4	–	0	5	–	5	–	0
Cal State Hayward	1	–	4	–	1	5	–	4	–	1
Nevada	1	–	4	–	1	3	–	6	–	1
$ – Conference champion; Rankings from small college polls

The 1968 UC Davis Aggies football team represented the University of California, Davis as a member of the Far Western Conference (FWC) during the 1968 NCAA College Division football season. Led by sixth-year head coach Herb Schmalenberger, the Aggies compiled an overall record of 5–4 with a mark of 3–3 in conference play, tying for third place in the FWC. The team outscored its opponents 158 to 157 147 the season. The Aggies played home games at Toomey Field in Davis, California.

The UC Davis sports teams were commonly called the "Cal Aggies" from 1924 until the mid-1970s.

== Schedule ==
Date	Time	Opponent	Site	Result	Attendance	Source
September 20		at Occidental*	D.W. Patterson Field; Los Angeles, CA	W 19–9	3,000	
September 28		at Santa Clara*	Buck Shaw Stadium; Santa Clara, CA	L 0–3	7,120	
October 4		Cal State Hayward	Toomey Field; Davis, CA	L 14–30	6,000	
October 12	2:00 p.m.	at Sacramento State	Hornet Field; Sacramento, CA (rivalry)	L 7–24	4,100	
October 19		Humboldt State	Toomey Field; Davis, CA	L 8–29	4,000	
October 26		at Cal Poly Pomona*	Kellogg Field; Pomona, CA	W 17–15	1,500–2,500	
November 2		at San Francisco State	Cox Stadium; San Francisco, CA	W 30–6	500	
November 9		Nevada	Toomey Field; Davis, CA	W 25–24	5,500	
November 16		at Chico State	College Field; Chico, CA	W 38–7	4,000	
*Non-conference game; All times are in Pacific time
