= 1968 Florida A&M Rattlers football team =

American college football season

1968 Florida A&M Rattlers football

SIAC Division I champion

Orange Blossom Classic, L 9–36 vs. Alcorn A&M
- Conference: Southern Intercollegiate Athletic Conference
- Division I
- Record: 8–2 (5–0 SIAC)
- Head coach: Jake Gaither (24th season)
- Home stadium: Bragg Memorial Stadium

1968 Southern Intercollegiate Athletic Conference football standings
	Conf.					Overall
Team	W		L		T	W		L		T
Division I
No. T–19 Florida A&M x	5	–	0	–	0	8	–	2	–	0
South Carolina State	4	–	1	–	0	7	–	2	–	0
Bethune–Cookman	3	–	2	–	0	4	–	4	–	0
Alabama A&M	2	–	3	–	0	5	–	4	–	0
Morris Brown	1	–	4	–	0	2	–	7	–	0
Allen	0	–	5	–	0	0	–	7	–	0
Division II
Tuskegee x	6	–	0	–	0	8	–	2	–	0
Alabama State	4	–	1	–	1	8	–	1	–	1
Lane	4	–	1	–	0	6	–	2	–	0
Fort Valley State	4	–	2	–	0	7	–	2	–	0
Clark (GA)	3	–	4	–	0	4	–	5	–	0
Morehouse	2	–	3	–	1	3	–	3	–	2
Fisk	1	–	6	–	0	2	–	8	–	0
Knoxville	0	–	7	–	0	0	–	7	–	0
x – Division champion/co-champions; Rankings from UPI small college poll

The 1968 Florida A&M Rattlers football team represented Florida A&M University as a member of Division I of the Southern Intercollegiate Athletic Conference (SIAC) during the 1968 NCAA College Division football season. Led by 24th-year head coach Jake Gaither, the Rattlers finished the season overall record of 8–2 and a mark of 5–0 in conference play, and won the SIAC Division I title. Florida A&M was defeated by Alcorn A&M in the Orange Blossom Classic.

== Schedule ==
Date	Opponent	Site	Result	Attendance	Source
September 28	Allen	Bragg Memorial Stadium; Tallahassee, FL	W 48–0	7,000	
October 5	at South Carolina State	State College Stadium; Orangeburg, SC	W 25–3		
October 12	Alabama A&M	Bragg Memorial Stadium; Tallahassee, FL	W 33–7		
October 18	at Morris Brown	Herndon Stadium; Atlanta, GA	W 7–0		
October 26	Tennessee State*	Bragg Memorial Stadium; Tallahassee, FL	W 32–13	16,000	
November 9	North Carolina A&T*^{†}	Bragg Memorial Stadium; Tallahassee, FL	L 6–9		
November 16	at Southern*	University Stadium; Baton Rouge, LA	W 33–24		
November 23	at Bethune–Cookman	Welch Stadium; Daytona Beach, FL (Florida Classic)	W 23–20		
November 30	vs. Texas Southern*	Tampa Stadium; Tampa, FL	W 20–7	16,000	
December 7	vs. Alcorn A&M*	Miami Orange Bowl; Miami, FL (Orange Blossom Classic)	L 9–36	37,390	
*Non-conference game; ^{†}Homecoming; Source:
