= 1968 Chico State Wildcats football team =

American college football season

1968 Chico State Wildcats football
- Conference: Far Western Conference
- Record: 5–5 (2–4 FWC)
- Head coach: Pete Riehlman (1st season)
- Home stadium: College Field

1968 Far Western Conference football standings
	Conf.					Overall
Team	W		L		T	W		L		T
No. 16 AP / #10 UPI Humboldt State $	6	–	0	–	0	10	–	1	–	0
Sacramento State	4	–	2	–	0	8	–	3	–	0
UC Davis	3	–	3	–	0	5	–	4	–	0
San Francisco State	3	–	3	–	0	5	–	5	–	0
Chico State	2	–	4	–	0	5	–	5	–	0
Cal State Hayward	1	–	4	–	1	5	–	4	–	1
Nevada	1	–	4	–	1	3	–	6	–	1
$ – Conference champion; Rankings from small college polls

The 1968 Chico State Wildcats football team represented Chico State College—now known as California State University, Chico—as a member of the Far Western Conference (FWC) during the 1968 NCAA College Division football season. Led by second-year head coach Pete Riehlman, Chico State compiled an overall record of 5–5 with a mark of 2–4 in conference play, placing fifth in the FWC. The team was outscored by its opponents 206 to 149 for the season. The Wildcats played home games at College Field in Chico, California.

== Schedule ==
Date	Opponent	Site	Result	Attendance	Source
September 14	Oregon Tech*	College Field; Chico, CA	W 21–7	5,700	
September 21	at Redlands*	Redlands Stadium; Redlands, CA	L 7–10	3,000	
September 28	at Southern Oregon*	Fuller Field; Ashland, OR	W 20–10	3,000	
October 5	at San Francisco State	Cox Stadium; San Francisco, CA	L 19–21	2,000	
October 12	Nevada	College Field; Chico, CA	W 20–15	3,000	
October 19	Cal Poly Pomona*	College Field; Chico, CA	W 24–13	4,000–4,500	
October 26	Cal State Hayward	College Field; Chico, CA	W 24–21	7,000–8,000	
November 2	at Sacramento State	Hornet Field; Sacramento, CA	L 0–14	5,000	
November 9	at Humboldt State	Redwood Bowl; Arcata, CA	L 7–57	6,000–6,500	
November 16	UC Davis	College Field; Chico, CA	L 7–38	4,000	
*Non-conference game
