= 1968 Montana Grizzlies football team =

American college football season

1968 Montana Grizzlies football
- Conference: Big Sky Conference
- Record: 2–7 (0–4 Big Sky)
- Head coach: Jack Swarthout (2nd season)
- Captain: Jim Kelly
- Home stadium: Dornblaser Field

1968 Big Sky Conference football standings
	Conf.					Overall
Team	W		L		T	W		L		T
Weber State +	3	–	1	–	0	7	–	2	–	0
Montana State +	3	–	1	–	0	6	–	4	–	0
Idaho +	3	–	1	–	0	5	–	5	–	0
Idaho State	1	–	3	–	0	4	–	5	–	0
Montana	0	–	4	–	0	2	–	7	–	0
+ – Conference co-champions

The 1968 Montana Grizzlies football team represented the University of Montana in the 1968 NCAA College Division football season as a member of the Big Sky Conference (Big Sky). The Grizzlies were led by second-year head coach Jack Swarthout, played their home games at Dornblaser Field, and finished the season with a record of two wins and seven losses (2–7, 0–4 in Big Sky, last).

== Schedule ==
Date	Time	Opponent	Site	Result	Attendance	Source
September 14	8:00 pm	vs. North Dakota*	Daylis Stadium; Billings, MT	W 37–10	7,000	
September 21	6:30 pm	at South Dakota*	Inman Field; Vermillion, SD	L 0–21	9,000–9,500	
September 28	1:30 pm	Portland State*	Dornblaser Field; Missoula, MT	W 58–0	8,500	
October 5	1:30 pm	Utah State*^{†}	Dornblaser Field; Missoula, MT	L 3–50	11,000	
October 12	2:35 pm	at Idaho	Neale Stadium; Moscow, ID (Little Brown Stein)	L 45–56	10,793	
October 19	2:00 pm	at Idaho State	Spud Bowl; Pocatello, ID	L 13–23	6,000	
November 2	1:30 pm	Montana State	Dornblaser Field; Missoula, MT (rivalry)	L 24–29	12,000	
November 9	1:30 pm	Weber State	Dornblaser Field; Missoula, MT	L 16–20	3,000	
November 16	1:30 pm	at Northern Arizona*	Lumberjack Stadium; Flagstaff, AZ	L 0–18	2,400–4,000	
*Non-conference game; ^{†}Homecoming; All times are in Mountain time

== Coaching staff ==
- Jack Elway (AHC, DB)
- Bill Betcher (line)
- Wally Brown (line)
- Ron Nord (LB, E)
