= 1968 Boise State Broncos football team =

American college football season

1968 Boise State Broncos football
- Conference: Independent
- Record: 8–2
- Head coach: Tony Knap (1st season)
- Home stadium: Bronco Stadium

1968 NAIA independents football records
| | Conf. | | | Overall |
| Team | W | L | T | W | | L | | T |
|---|---|---|---|---|---|---|---|---|
| No. 7 Doane | | – | | 10 | – | 0 | – | 0 |
| New Mexico Highlands | | – | | 9 | – | 0 | – | 0 |
| No. 15 Ferris State | | – | | 7 | – | 0 | – | 1 |
| No. 9 Cal Lutheran | | – | | 9 | – | 1 | – | 0 |
| No. 10 Emory and Henry | | – | | 9 | – | 1 | – | 0 |
| Indiana (PA) | | – | | 9 | – | 1 | – | 0 |
| No. 16 Austin | | – | | 8 | – | 1 | – | 0 |
| No. 11 Appalachian State | | – | | 8 | – | 2 | – | 0 |
| Boise State | | – | | 8 | – | 2 | – | 0 |
| No. 20 Carson–Newman | | – | | 8 | – | 2 | – | 0 |
| La Verne | | – | | 7 | – | 2 | – | 0 |
| Hillsdale | | – | | 6 | – | 3 | – | 0 |
| St. Mary of the Plains | | – | | 6 | – | 4 | – | 0 |
| Oklahoma Panhandle State | | – | | 5 | – | 5 | – | 1 |
| Eastern New Mexico | | – | | 4 | – | 5 | – | 1 |
| Simon Fraser | | – | | 4 | – | 5 | – | 0 |
| Southern Colorado State | | – | | 4 | – | 6 | – | 0 |
| Southwest State (MN) | | – | | 3 | – | 5 | – | 0 |
| Wofford | | – | | 4 | – | 7 | – | 0 |
| Westminster (UT) | | – | | 3 | – | 6 | – | 0 |
| Georgetown (KY) | | – | | 2 | – | 6 | – | 0 |
| Azusa Pacific | | – | | 2 | – | 7 | – | 0 |
| Kentucky State | | – | | 2 | – | 7 | – | 0 |
| Missouri Southern | | – | | 2 | – | 8 | – | 0 |
| Iowa Wesleyan | | – | | 1 | – | 7 | – | 1 |
Rankings from NAIA poll

The 1968 Boise State Broncos football team represented Boise State College during the 1968 NAIA football season, the first season of Bronco football at the four-year level. It was the first of two seasons Boise played as an NAIA independent after departing the NJCAA and the Intermountain Collegiate Athletic Conference. It was also the first season under the school's new name, after being known as Boise College since 1965.

The Broncos played their home games on campus at the original Bronco Stadium in Boise, Idaho. Led by first-year head coach Tony Knap, who succeeded legendary Bronco head coach Lyle Smith, the Broncos finished with an 8–2 record. After starting the season 1–2, the Broncos finished strong with seven straight victories, including wins over Evergreen Conference champions Central Washington and in-state rivals Idaho State and the College of Idaho. BSC was listed among the top thirty small college teams at the end of the season.

== Schedule ==
| Date | Time | Opponent | Site | Result | Attendance | Source |
|---|---|---|---|---|---|---|
| September 21 | 8:00 pm | Linfield | Bronco Stadium; Boise, ID | L 7–17 | 6,300 | |
| September 28 | 8:00 pm | Westminster (UT) | Bronco Stadium; Boise, ID | W 50–2 | | |
| October 5 | 8:00 pm | at Weber State | Wildcat Stadium; Ogden, UT | L 3–44 | | |
| October 12 | 8:00 pm | Eastern Washington | Bronco Stadium; Boise, ID | W 20–0 | 4,300 | |
| October 19 | 2:30 pm | at Whitworth | Joe Albi Stadium; Spokane, WA | W 49–0 | 2,000 | |
| October 26 | 2:30 pm | at Eastern Oregon | Community Stadium; La Grande, OR | W 50–27 | | |
| November 2 | 1:30 pm | Idaho State^{†} | Bronco Stadium; Boise, ID | W 27–20 | 7,500 | |
| November 9 | 1:30 pm | Western State (CO) | Bronco Stadium; Boise, ID | W 41–0 | 3,500 | |
| November 16 | 2:30 pm | at Central Washington | Tomlinson Stadium; Ellensburg, WA | W 61–7 | | |
| November 23 | 2:00 pm | at College of Idaho | Simplot Stadium; Caldwell, ID | W 16–7 | | |
^{†}Homecoming; All times are in Mountain time
