= 1968 Southern Jaguars football team =

American college football season

1968 Southern Jaguars football
- Conference: Southwestern Athletic Conference
- Record: 4–6 (3–4 SWAC)
- Head coach: Robert E. Smith (4th season)
- Home stadium: University Stadium

1968 Southwestern Athletic Conference football standings
	Conf.					Overall
Team	W		L		T	W		L		T
No. 3 Alcorn A&M +	6	–	1	–	0	8	–	1	–	0
Grambling +	6	–	1	–	0	9	–	2	–	0
Texas Southern +	6	–	1	–	0	6	–	4	–	0
Arkansas AM&N	4	–	3	–	0	5	–	5	–	0
Southern	3	–	4	–	0	4	–	6	–	0
Prairie View A&M	2	–	5	–	0	4	–	6	–	0
Jackson State	1	–	6	–	0	3	–	6	–	0
Wiley	0	–	7	–	0	2	–	8	–	0
+ – Conference co-champions; Rankings from NAIA poll

The 1968 Southern Jaguars football team was an American football team that represented Southern University as a member of the Southwestern Athletic Conference (SWAC) during the 1968 NCAA College Division football season. Led by Robert E. Smith in his fourth season as head coach, the Jaguars compiled an overall record of 4–6 with a mark of 3–4 in conference play, placing fifth in the SWAC.

== Schedule ==
Date	Opponent	Site	Result	Attendance	Source
September 21	at Texas Southern	Rice Stadium; Houston, TX	L 3–6		
September 28	Prairie View A&M	University Stadium; Baton Rouge, LA	W 26–0		
October 5	at Mississippi Valley State*	Magnolia Stadium; Itta Bena, MS	W 27–0		
October 12	at Arkansas AM&N	Pumphrey Stadium; Pine Bluff, AR	L 14–24		
October 19	Jackson State	University Stadium; Baton Rouge, LA	W 30–16		
October 26	at Alcorn A&M	Henderson Stadium; Lorman, MS	L 14–26	7,000–7,600	
November 2	at Tennessee State*	Hale Stadium; Nashville, TN	L 0–16		
November 9	Wiley	University Stadium; Baton Rouge, LA	W 22–9		
November 16	Florida A&M*	University Stadium; Baton Rouge, LA	L 24–33		
November 23	Grambling	University Stadium; Baton Rouge, LA (rivalry)	L 32–34		
*Non-conference game
