= 1968 Prairie View A&M Panthers football team =

American college football season

1968 Prairie View A&M Panthers football
- Conference: Southwestern Athletic Conference
- Record: 4–6 (2–5 SWAC)
- Head coach: Hoover J. Wright (3rd season)
- Home stadium: Edward L. Blackshear Field

1968 Southwestern Athletic Conference football standings
	Conf.					Overall
Team	W		L		T	W		L		T
No. 3 Alcorn A&M +	6	–	1	–	0	8	–	1	–	0
Grambling +	6	–	1	–	0	9	–	2	–	0
Texas Southern +	6	–	1	–	0	6	–	4	–	0
Arkansas AM&N	4	–	3	–	0	5	–	5	–	0
Southern	3	–	4	–	0	4	–	6	–	0
Prairie View A&M	2	–	5	–	0	4	–	6	–	0
Jackson State	1	–	6	–	0	3	–	6	–	0
Wiley	0	–	7	–	0	2	–	8	–	0
+ – Conference co-champions; Rankings from NAIA poll

The 1968 Prairie View A&M Panthers football team represented Prairie View A&M University as a member of the Southwestern Athletic Conference (SWAC) during the 1968 NCAA College Division football season. They were led by third-year head coach Hoover J. Wright and played their home games at Edward L. Blackshear Field in Prairie View, Texas. Prairie View A&M finished the season with an overall record of 4–6 and a mark of 2–5 in conference play, placing sixth in the SWAC.

== Schedule ==
Date	Opponent	Site	Result	Source
September 21	at Jackson State	Mississippi Veterans Memorial Stadium; Jackson, MS	W 10–8	
September 28	at Southern	A. W. Mumford Stadium; Baton Rouge, LA	L 0–26	
October 5	Grambling*	Edward L. Blackshear Field; Prairie View, TX	L 14–22	
October 19	at Bishop*	Dallas, TX (State Fair Classic)	L 10–13	
October 26	Arkansas AM&N	Edward L. Blackshear Field; Prairie View, TX	L 0–9	
November 2	Mississippi Valley State*	Edward L. Blackshear Field; Prairie View, TX	W 19–7	
November 9	at Allen*	Columbia, SC	W 20–2	
November 16	Alcorn A&M	Edward L. Blackshear Field; Prairie View, TX	L 3–17	
November 23	at Texas Southern	Jeppesen Stadium; Houston, TX	L 14–22	
November 30	at Wiley	Maverick Stadium; Marshall, TX	W 22–15	
*Non-conference game
