= 1967 Weber State Wildcats football team =

American college football season

1967 Weber State Wildcats football
- Conference: Big Sky Conference
- Record: 6–4 (2–2 Big Sky)
- Head coach: Sark Arslanian (3rd season)
- Home stadium: Wildcat Stadium

1967 Big Sky Conference football standings
	Conf.					Overall
Team	W		L		T	W		L		T
Montana State $	4	–	0	–	0	7	–	3	–	0
Montana	2	–	2	–	0	7	–	3	–	0
Weber State	2	–	2	–	0	6	–	4	–	0
Idaho	2	–	2	–	0	4	–	6	–	0
Idaho State	0	–	4	–	0	1	–	9	–	0
$ – Conference champion

The 1967 Weber State Wildcats football team represented Weber State College (now known as Weber State University) as a member of the Big Sky Conference during the 1967 NCAA College Division football season. Led by third-year head coach Sark Arslanian, the Wildcats compiled an overall record of 6–4, with a mark of 2–2 in conference play, and finished tied for second in the Big Sky.

== Schedule ==
Date	Opponent	Site	Result	Attendance	Source
September 16	Northern Arizona*	Wildcat Stadium; Ogden, UT	W 29–28	13,186	
September 23	at No. 1 San Diego State*	San Diego Stadium; San Diego, CA	L 12–58	36,741	
September 30	Montana	Wildcat Stadium; Ogden, UT	L 12–13	7,284	
October 7	Cal State Los Angeles*	Wildcat Stadium; Ogden, UT	W 13–3	6,800–6,857	
October 14	Parsons*	Wildcat Stadium; Ogden, UT	L 14–31	6,345	
October 21	at Montana State	Gatton Field; Bozeman, MT	L 6–21	9,500	
October 28	at Idaho State	Spud Bowl; Pocatello, ID	W 19–7	4,000	
November 4	Idaho	Wildcat Stadium; Ogden, UT	W 28–17	8,100	
November 11	Portland State*	Wildcat Stadium; Ogden, UT	W 40–21	6,046	
November 18	at Western State (CO)*	Gunnison, CO	W 20–0	1,500	
*Non-conference game; Rankings from AP Poll released prior to the game
