= 1968 Idaho Vandals football team =

American college football season

1968 Idaho Vandals football

Big Sky co-champion
- Conference: Big Sky Conference
- Record: 5–5 (3–1 Big Sky)
- Head coach: Y C McNease (1st season)
- MVP: Jerry Hendren
- Captains: Kenny Dotson; Rob Young
- Home stadium: Neale Stadium

1968 Big Sky Conference football standings
	Conf.					Overall
Team	W		L		T	W		L		T
Weber State +	3	–	1	–	0	7	–	2	–	0
Montana State +	3	–	1	–	0	6	–	4	–	0
Idaho +	3	–	1	–	0	5	–	5	–	0
Idaho State	1	–	3	–	0	4	–	5	–	0
Montana	0	–	4	–	0	2	–	7	–	0
+ – Conference co-champions

The 1968 Idaho Vandals football team represented the University of Idaho in the 1968 NCAA College Division football season. The Vandals were led by first-year head coach Y C McNease and played in the Big Sky Conference. Home games were played on campus at Neale Stadium in Moscow, with one home game in Boise at old Bronco Stadium at Boise Junior College.

This was the last season for Neale Stadium, which opened 31 years earlier in 1937. It hosted only two games in 1968, and the final one was a win over Weber State on November 2. Due to soil erosion, the wooden grandstands were deemed unsafe the following summer and home games were moved to Rogers Field in Pullman for two seasons.

After fullback Ray McDonald won the NCAA rushing title in 1966, the Vandals were involuntarily dropped by the NCAA to the college division in 1967. After two seasons, Idaho returned to the university division in 1969.

Hired in early January, McNease was previously an assistant coach at Michigan under Bump Elliott. For the second straight season, Idaho allowed 77 points at the Astrodome in Houston.

== Schedule ==
Date	Time	Opponent	Site	Result	Attendance	Source
September 14	7:00 pm	vs. Montana State	Memorial Stadium; Great Falls, MT	L 14–17	7,500–8,500	
September 21	1:30 pm	at Washington State*	Joe Albi Stadium; Spokane, WA (Battle of the Palouse)	L 7–14	23,612	
September 28	1:00 pm	at Idaho State	Spud Bowl; Pocatello, ID	W 35–15		
October 5	12:30 pm	vs. Pacific (CA)*	old Bronco Stadium; Boise, ID	W 31–14	8,500	
October 12	1:30 pm	Montana^{†}	Neale Stadium; Moscow, ID (Little Brown Stein)	W 56–45	10,793	
October 19	1:30 pm	at Oregon*	Autzen Stadium; Eugene, OR	L 8–23	17,250	
October 26	1:30 pm	at Washington*	Husky Stadium; Seattle, WA	L 7–37	49,538	
November 2	12:30 pm	Weber State	Neale Stadium; Moscow, ID	W 50–42	10,005	
November 9	8:00 pm	at San Jose State*	Spartan Stadium; San Jose, CA	W 35–17	10,500	
November 16	5:30 pm	at No. 14 Houston*	Houston Astrodome; Houston, TX	L 3–77	30,412	
*Non-conference game; ^{†}Homecoming; Rankings from AP Poll released prior to the game; All times are in Pacific time

== Roster ==
1968 Idaho Vandals football team roster
Players
Coaches
Offense

Pos.	#	Name	Class
WR	10	Jim Wickboldt	Jr
QB	11	Steve Olson	So
QB	14	Mitch Lansdell	So
RB, P	12	Ron Davis	So
RB	35	Dale Yount	So
WR	38	Russ Peterson
RB, PK	42	Rob Young (C)	Sr
RB	43	Jim Pearsall	Sr
RB	44	Jeff Guillory	Jr
WR	45	Jim Wilund	So
C	51	Gary Atkinson
RG	61	Dick Chatfield
LG	62	Tom Nelson	Jr
OL	67	John Durham	So
OL	68	Jim Wimer	So
OL	70	David Bennett
OL	71	Jim Thiemens
OL	74	Bruce Langmade	So
LT	77	Bob Haney	Jr
OL	78	Larry Kelly
RT	79	Gary Grove
TE	82	Mike Dempsey	Jr
WR	84	Jerry Hendren	Jr
TE, P	88	Dwight Bennett
TE	89	Gordon DeWaard	Jr

Defense

Pos.	#	Name	Class
S	16	Wayne Marquess	Jr
DB	20	Doug Clark	Jr
DB	21	Dick Nelson
S	24	Bob Juba	Jr
CB	26	Art Chubb
CB	27	Kenny Dotson (C)	Sr
LB	31	Mike Wiscombe	So
LB	36	Fred Gabourie
DB	40	Craig Wiegman
LB	50	Roosevelt Owens	Jr
LB	55	Joe Tasby	Jr
DL	60	Tom Carson	Jr
DL	63	Pat Flynn	So
DL	66	Ed Clauson	Jr
DL	69	Brock Jackley	So
DL	73	Joe Allen
DL	75	Ken Salesky
LB	80	John Knowles	Jr
LB	86	Ed Schmidt

Special teams

Pos.	#	Name	Class
PK	42	Rob Young	Sr

Head coach

- Y C McNease (1st year)

Coordinators/assistant coaches

- Harvey Griffin (OB, AHC)
- Benson Holland (DB)
- Don Robbins (DL)
- Gary Sloan (Rec)
- Ed Troxel (OL)

Legend

- (C) Team captain
- (S) Suspended
- (I) Ineligible
- Injured
- Redshirt

== All-conference ==
Wide receiver Jerry Hendren and linebacker Joe Tasby were unanimous selections to the all-conference team, and were joined by running back Rob Young.

== NFL draft ==
Two juniors from the 1968 Vandals were selected in the 1970 NFL draft, which lasted 17 rounds (442 selections).

Player	Position	Round	Overall	Franchise
Jerry Hendren	WR	4th	89	Denver Broncos
Bob Haney	T	15th	383	Detroit Lions
