= 1968 Jackson State Tigers football team =

American college football season

1968 Jackson State Tigers football
- Conference: Southwestern Athletic Conference
- Record: 3–6 (1–6 SWAC)
- Head coach: Rod Paige (5th season)
- Home stadium: Alumni Field; Mississippi Veterans Memorial Stadium

1968 Southwestern Athletic Conference football standings
	Conf.					Overall
Team	W		L		T	W		L		T
No. 3 Alcorn A&M +	6	–	1	–	0	8	–	1	–	0
Grambling +	6	–	1	–	0	9	–	2	–	0
Texas Southern +	6	–	1	–	0	6	–	4	–	0
Arkansas AM&N	4	–	3	–	0	5	–	5	–	0
Southern	3	–	4	–	0	4	–	6	–	0
Prairie View A&M	2	–	5	–	0	4	–	6	–	0
Jackson State	1	–	6	–	0	3	–	6	–	0
Wiley	0	–	7	–	0	2	–	8	–	0
+ – Conference co-champions; Rankings from NAIA poll

The 1968 Jackson State Tigers football team represented Jackson State College (now known as Jackson State University) as a member of the Southwestern Athletic Conference (SWAC) during the 1968 NCAA College Division football season. Led by fifth-year head coach Rod Paige, the Tigers compiled an overall record of 3–6, with a conference record of 1–6, and finished seventh in the SWAC.

== Schedule ==
Date	Opponent	Site	Result	Attendance	Source
September 21	Prairie View A&M	Mississippi Veterans Memorial Stadium; Jackson, MS	L 8–10	11,321	
September 28	No. 20 Alcorn A&M	Henderson Stadium; Lorman, MS	L 6–30	8,240	
October 5	Arkansas AM&N	Alumni Field; Jackson, MS	L 14–15	6,445	
October 19	at Southern	University Stadium; Baton Rouge, LA (rivalry)	L 16–30	11,648	
October 26	at Grambling	Grambling Stadium; Grambling, LA	L 33–35	18,000	
November 2	Wiley	Alumni Field; Jackson, MS	W 23–7	7,486	
November 9	Texas Southern	Alumni Field; Jackson, MS	L 0–14	3,267	
November 16	at Bishop*	Dallas, TX	W 21–15	3,682	
November 23	at Mississippi Valley State*	Mississippi Veterans Memorial Stadium; Jackson, MS	W 32–7	10,763	
*Non-conference game; Rankings from AP Poll released prior to the game
