= 1968 North Dakota State Bison football team =

American college football season

1968 North Dakota State Bison football

AP small college national champion NCC champion

Pecan Bowl, W 23–14 vs. Arkansas State
- Conference: North Central Conference
- Record: 10–0 (6–0 NCC)
- Head coach: Ron Erhardt (3rd season)
- Home stadium: Dacotah Field

1968 North Central Conference football standings
	Conf.					Overall
Team	W		L		T	W		L		T
No. 1 North Dakota State $	6	–	0	–	0	10	–	0	–	0
No. 8 South Dakota	5	–	1	–	0	9	–	1	–	0
State College of Iowa	3	–	3	–	0	5	–	5	–	0
North Dakota	3	–	3	–	0	3	–	5	–	0
South Dakota State	2	–	4	–	0	4	–	6	–	0
Morningside	2	–	4	–	0	4	–	5	–	0
Augustana (SD)	0	–	6	–	0	2	–	7	–	0
$ – Conference champion; Rankings from AP small college poll

The 1968 North Dakota State Bison football team was an American football team that represented North Dakota State University as a member of the North Central Conference (NCC) during the 1968 NCAA College Division football season. In their third season under head coach Ron Erhardt, the team compiled a 10–0 record (6–0 against conference opponents), won the conference championship, and defeated Arkansas State in the Pecan Bowl. The team was ranked No. 1 in the AP small college poll. The 1968 season was part of an unbeaten streak that lasted from the team's defeat in the 1967 Pecan Bowl until October 16, 1971.

== Schedule ==
Date	Opponent	Rank	Site	Result	Attendance	Source
September 14	Nebraska–Omaha*		Dacotah Field; Fargo, ND	W 49–7	9,850	
September 21	South Dakota State		Dacotah Field; Fargo, ND (rivalry)	W 21–3	10,220	
September 28	at Northern Illinois*	No. 3	Huskie Stadium; DeKalb, IL	W 31–3	17,797	
October 5	at South Dakota	No. 2	Inman Memorial Stadium; Vermillion, SD	W 35–13	4,500	
October 12	Augustana (SD)	No. 2	Dacotah Field; Fargo, ND	W 70–18	10,925	
October 19	at North Dakota	No. 2	Memorial Stadium; Grand Forks, ND (Nickel Trophy)	W 14–8	9,350–9,750	
October 26	Morningside	No. 2	Dacotah Field; Fargo, ND	W 42–14	8,425	
November 2	at State College of Iowa	No. 2	O. R. Latham Stadium; Cedar Falls, IA	W 31–15	8,000	
November 9	Mankato State	No. 2	Dacotah Field; Fargo, ND	W 63–8	4,100	
December 14	vs. No. 15 Arkansas State	No. 1	Memorial Stadium; Arlington, TX (Pecan Bowl)	W 23–14	7,200	
*Non-conference game; Rankings from AP Poll released prior to the game
