= 1968 Cal Poly Mustangs football team =

American college football season

1968 Cal Poly Mustangs football
- Conference: California Collegiate Athletic Association
- Record: 7–3 (2–2 CCAA)
- Head coach: Joe Harper (1st season)
- Home stadium: Mustang Stadium

1968 California Collegiate Athletic Association football standings
	Conf.					Overall
Team	W		L		T	W		L		T
No. 18 Fresno State $	4	–	0	–	0	7	–	4	–	0
Cal Poly	2	–	2	–	0	7	–	3	–	0
Cal State Los Angeles	2	–	2	–	0	6	–	3	–	0
Valley State	1	–	3	–	0	5	–	4	–	0
Long Beach State	1	–	3	–	0	3	–	7	–	0
$ – Conference champion; Rankings from UPI small college poll

The 1968 Cal Poly Mustangs football team represented California Polytechnic State College—now known as California Polytechnic State University, San Luis Obispo—as a member of the California Collegiate Athletic Association (CCAA) during the 1968 NCAA College Division football season. Led by first-year head coach Joe Harper, Cal Poly compiled an overall record of 7–3 with a mark of 2–2 in conference play, tying for second place in the CCAA. The Mustangs played home games at Mustang Stadium in San Luis Obispo, California.

== Schedule ==
Date	Opponent	Site	Result	Attendance	Source
September 14	Santa Clara*	Mustang Stadium; San Luis Obispo, CA	W 23–16	5,400	
September 21	Sacramento State*	Mustang Stadium; San Luis Obispo, CA	L 7–13	6,400	
September 28	at San Francisco State*	Cox Stadium; San Francisco, CA	W 27–0	5,850	
October 12	Cal Western*	Balboa Stadium?; San Diego, CA	W 31–0	2,200	
October 19	at Fresno State	Ratcliffe Stadium; Fresno, CA	L 0–17	9,500–10,071	
October 26	Valley State	Mustang Stadium; San Luis Obispo, CA	W 31–21	6,600	
November 2	at Long Beach State	Veterans Stadium; Long Beach, CA	L 7–12	5,128	
November 9	Cal State Los Angeles	Mustang Stadium; San Luis Obispo, CA	W 22–20	3,800–3,900	
November 16	at UC Santa Barbara*	Campus Stadium; Santa Barbara, CA	W 24–14	10,000	
November 25	at Cal Poly Pomona*	Kellogg Field; Pomona, CA	W 38–20	1,500–2,000	
*Non-conference game
