= 1968 Alcorn A&M Braves football team =

American college football season

1968 Alcorn A&M Braves football

Black college football national champion SWAC champion
- Conference: Southwestern Athletic Conference
- Record: 9–1 (7–1 SWAC)
- Head coach: Marino Casem (3rd season)
- Home stadium: Henderson Stadium

1968 Southwestern Athletic Conference football standings
	Conf.					Overall
Team	W		L		T	W		L		T
No. 3 Alcorn A&M +	6	–	1	–	0	8	–	1	–	0
Grambling +	6	–	1	–	0	9	–	2	–	0
Texas Southern +	6	–	1	–	0	6	–	4	–	0
Arkansas AM&N	4	–	3	–	0	5	–	5	–	0
Southern	3	–	4	–	0	4	–	6	–	0
Prairie View A&M	2	–	5	–	0	4	–	6	–	0
Jackson State	1	–	6	–	0	3	–	6	–	0
Wiley	0	–	7	–	0	2	–	8	–	0
+ – Conference co-champions; Rankings from NAIA poll

The 1968 Alcorn A&M Braves football team was an American football team that represented Alcorn A&M University in the Southwestern Athletic Conference (SWAC) during 1968 NCAA College Division football season. In their third season under head coach Marino Casem, Alcorn compiled a 9–1 record (7–1 against conference opponents), won the SWAC championship, and outscored opponents by a total of 359 to 85.

Alcorn A&M was also recognized as the black college national champion.

== Schedule ==
Date	Opponent	Rank	Site	Result	Attendance	Source
September 22	at Grambling		Grambling Stadium; Grambling, LA	W 28–12	6,300	
September 28	Jackson State	No. 20	Henderson Stadium; Lorman, MS	W 30–6	6,400	
October 12	at Wiley	No. 16	Maverick Stadium; Marshall, TX	W 60–5	600	
October 19	Texas Southern	No. 14	Henderson Stadium; Lorman, MS	L 21–35	7,200	
October 26	Southern		Henderson Stadium; Lorman, MS	W 26–14	7,000–7,600	
November 2	at Arkansas AM&N		Pumphrey Stadium; Pine Bluff, AR	W 53–0	5,400	
November 9	at Mississippi Valley State	No. 19	Magnolia Stadium; Itta Bena, MS	W 40–0	800	
November 16	at Prairie View A&M		Edward L. Blackshear Field; Prairie View, TX	W 17–3	2,200	
November 23	vs. Kentucky State*		City Park Stadium; Vicksburg, MS	W 48–0	3,000	
December 7	vs. Florida A&M		Miami Orange Bowl; Miami, FL (Orange Blossom Classic)	W 36–9	37,390	
*Non-conference game; Rankings from UPI Poll released prior to the game
