= Dick Trachok =

American athletic director, football coach and former player (1925–2020)

Biographical details
- Born: December 27, 1925; Jerome, Pennsylvania, U.S.
- Died: August 2, 2020 (aged 94); Reno, Nevada, U.S.

Playing career
- 1943: Pittsburgh
- 1946–1948: Nevada
- Positions: Halfback, fullback

Coaching career (HC unless noted)
- 1949–1958: Reno HS (NV)
- 1959–1968: Nevada

Administrative career (AD unless noted)
- 1969–1986: Nevada

Head coaching record
- Overall: 40–48–3 (college)

Richard Matthew Trachok (December 27, 1925 – August 2, 2020) was an American university athletic director and college football coach. He served as the head coach at the University of Nevada, Reno from 1959 to 1968. He amassed a 40–48–3 record during his tenure. Trachok served as the University of Nevada athletic director until 1986.

During World War II, he served in the United States Army Air Corps. He then attended the University of Nevada, Reno, where he played on the football team as a halfback from 1946 to 1948.

Trachok coached the Reno High School football team, where the Deseret News described him as "one of Nevada's most successful high school gridiron coaches." During a coaching clinic held in 1957 at the University of Utah, he recommended that coaches keep their offenses and defenses simple.

In April 1959, Nevada hired Trachok as its head coach. In November 1960, Trachok canceled a six-hour flight to Denver in favor of a 32-hour bus ride after a plane crash killed sixteen players from California Polytechnic. The Nevada flight had been booked with Arctic-Pacific, the same carrier that Cal Poly had used. Trachok finished his coaching tenure with a 40–48–3 record, and took over as Nevada's athletic director. He held that post until 1986. In 1975, the university inducted Trachok into the Nevada Athletics Hall of Fame.

Trachok died on August 2, 2020, at the age of 94.

== Head coaching record ==
=== College ===
Year	Team	Overall	Conference	Standing	Bowl/playoffs
Nevada Wolf Pack (Far Western Conference) (1959–1968)
1959	Nevada	4–3	3–2	3rd	
1960	Nevada	3–6	2–3	T–3rd	
1961	Nevada	5–4	2–3	T–4th	
1962	Nevada	5–3–1	2–2–1	3rd	
1963	Nevada	3–6	2–3	5th	
1964	Nevada	1–9	1–4	5th	
1965	Nevada	6–4	4–1	2nd	
1966	Nevada	6–3	3–3	T–3rd	
1967	Nevada	4–4–1	2–3–1	5th	
1968	Nevada	3–6–1	1–4–1	T–6th	
Nevada:		40–48–3	22–28–3		
Total:		40–48–3			
