= 1968 Sacramento State Hornets football team =

American college football season

1968 Sacramento State Hornets football

Pasadena Bowl, L 7–34 vs. Grambling
- Conference: Far Western Conference
- Record: 8–3 (4–2 FWC)
- Head coach: Ray Clemons (8th season)
- Home stadium: Hornet Field, Charles C. Hughes Stadium

1968 Far Western Conference football standings
	Conf.					Overall
Team	W		L		T	W		L		T
No. 16 AP / #10 UPI Humboldt State $	6	–	0	–	0	10	–	1	–	0
Sacramento State	4	–	2	–	0	8	–	3	–	0
UC Davis	3	–	3	–	0	5	–	4	–	0
San Francisco State	3	–	3	–	0	5	–	5	–	0
Chico State	2	–	4	–	0	5	–	5	–	0
Cal State Hayward	1	–	4	–	1	5	–	4	–	1
Nevada	1	–	4	–	1	3	–	6	–	1
$ – Conference champion; Rankings from small college polls

The 1968 Sacramento State Hornets football team represented Sacramento State College—now known as California State University, Sacramento—as a member of the Far Western Conference (FWC) during the 1968 NCAA College Division football season. Led by eighth-year head coach Ray Clemons, Sacramento State compiled an overall record of 8–3 with a mark of 4–2 in conference play, placing second in the FWC. The team outscored its opponents 245 to 137 for the season. The Hornets played home games at Hornet Field and Charles C. Hughes Stadium in Sacramento, California.

At the end of the season, the Hornets were invited to play in the Pasadena Bowl, where they lost to Grambling, 34–7. This was the second time Sacramento State had been invited to a bowl game, the previous being the Camellia Bowl in 1964.

== Schedule ==
Date	Time	Opponent	Site	Result	Attendance	Source
September 21		at Cal Poly*	Mustang Stadium; San Luis Obispo, CA	W 13–7	6,400	
September 28	2:00 p.m.	Cal Poly Pomona*	Hornet Field; Sacramento, CA	W 26–13	4,500	
October 5	8:00 p.m.	Humboldt State	Charles C. Hughes Stadium; Sacramento, CA	L 13–20	6,200–7,500	
October 12	2:00 p.m.	UC Davis	Hornet Field; Sacramento, CA (rivalry)	W 24–7	4,100	
October 19		at San Francisco State	Cox Stadium; San Francisco, CA	L 13–14	3,500	
October 26		at Nevada	Mackay Stadium; Reno, NV	W 17–14	5,000–6,200	
November 2		Chico State^{†}	Hornet Field; Sacramento, CA	W 14–0	5,000	
November 9		at Cal State Hayward	Pioneer Stadium; Hayward, CA	W 16–14	1,500–2,000	
November 16	2:00 p.m.	San Francisco*	Hornet Field; Sacramento, CA	W 76–0	1,500	
November 23	2:00 p.m.	at Cal Western*	Balboa Stadium; San Diego, CA	W 26–14	2,300–3,000	
December 7		vs. Grambling*	Rose Bowl; Pasadena, CA (Pasadena Bowl)	L 7–34	34,127	
*Non-conference game; ^{†}Homecoming; All times are in Pacific time
