= 1968 Tennessee State Tigers football team =

American college football season

1968 Tennessee State Tigers football
- Conference: Independent
- Record: 6–2–1
- Head coach: John Merritt (6th season)
- Home stadium: Hale Stadium

1968 NCAA College Division independents football records
	Conf.			Overall
Team	W	L	T	W		L		T
No. 2 San Diego State		–		9	–	0	–	1
No. 3 Chattanooga		–		9	–	1	–	0
Indiana State		–		9	–	1	–	0
Indiana (PA)		–		9	–	1	–	0
Nevada Southern		–		8	–	1	–	0
Ashland		–		8	–	2	–	0
No. 7 Eastern Michigan		–		8	–	2	–	0
Lincoln (MO)		–		8	–	2	–	0
St. Norbert		–		6	–	2	–	1
Tennessee State		–		6	–	2	–	1
UC Riverside		–		6	–	2	–	1
Hawaii		–		7	–	3	–	0
No. 14 Tampa		–		7	–	3	–	0
No. 17 Akron		–		7	–	3	–	1
Northeastern		–		6	–	3	–	0
Southern Illinois		–		6	–	3	–	0
Cortland		–		5	–	3	–	0
Boston University		–		5	–	3	–	1
Northern Arizona		–		6	–	4	–	0
Pacific (CA)		–		6	–	4	–	0
Samford		–		6	–	4	–	0
Northern Michigan		–		5	–	4	–	0
Parsons		–		5	–	4	–	0
Wheaton (IL)		–		5	–	4	–	0
Drake		–		5	–	5	–	0
UC Santa Barbara		–		4	–	4	–	1
Santa Clara		–		4	–	5	–	0
Portland State		–		4	–	6	–	0
Wayne State (MI)		–		3	–	6	–	0
Wabash		–		3	–	6	–	0
Colorado College		–		2	–	6	–	0
Kentucky State		–		2	–	7	–	0
Milwaukee		–		2	–	7	–	0
Lake Forest		–		2	–	8	–	0
Northern Illinois		–		2	–	8	–	0
Mississippi Valley State		–		1	–	7	–	0
UC San Diego		–		0	–	7	–	0
Rose Poly		–		0	–	8	–	0
Cal Poly Pomona		–		0	–	10	–	0
Rankings from AP small college poll

The 1968 Tennessee State Tigers football team represented Tennessee State University as an independent during the 1968 NCAA College Division football season. Led by sixth-year head coach John Merritt, the Tigers compiled an overall record of 6–2–1.

== Schedule ==
Date	Opponent	Site	Result	Attendance	Source
September 21	Kentucky State	Hale Stadium; Nashville, TN	W 40–7	8,000	
September 28	at Parsons	Blum Stadium; Fairfield, IA	W 21–12	4,500	
October 5	Texas Southern	Hale Stadium; Nashville, TN	W 11–10	9,500	
October 12	at Grambling	Grambling Stadium; Grambling, LA	L 21–30	16,000	
October 26	at Florida A&M	Bragg Memorial Stadium; Tallahassee, FL	L 13–32	16,000	
November 2	Southern	Hale Stadium; Nashville, TN	W 16–0	9,000	
November 9	Morris Brown	Hale Stadium; Nashville, TN	W 58–6	4,000	
November 23	at No. 1 San Diego State	San Diego Stadium; San Diego, CA	T 13–13	37,713	
November 28	Bishop	Hale Stadium; Nashville, TN	W 48–12	12,000	
Rankings from AP Poll released prior to the game
