= 1968 Grambling Tigers football team =

American college football season

1968 Grambling Tigers football

SWAC co-champion

Pasadena Bowl, W 34–7 vs. Sacramento State
- Conference: Southwestern Athletic Conference
- Record: 9–2 (6–1 SWAC)
- Head coach: Eddie Robinson (26th season)
- Home stadium: Grambling Stadium

1968 Southwestern Athletic Conference football standings
	Conf.					Overall
Team	W		L		T	W		L		T
No. 3 Alcorn A&M +	6	–	1	–	0	8	–	1	–	0
Grambling +	6	–	1	–	0	9	–	2	–	0
Texas Southern +	6	–	1	–	0	6	–	4	–	0
Arkansas AM&N	4	–	3	–	0	5	–	5	–	0
Southern	3	–	4	–	0	4	–	6	–	0
Prairie View A&M	2	–	5	–	0	4	–	6	–	0
Jackson State	1	–	6	–	0	3	–	6	–	0
Wiley	0	–	7	–	0	2	–	8	–	0
+ – Conference co-champions; Rankings from NAIA poll

The 1968 Grambling Tigers football team represented Grambling College (now known as Grambling State University) as a member of the Southwestern Athletic Conference (SWAC) during the 1968 NCAA College Division football season. Led by 26th-year head coach Eddie Robinson, the Tigers compiled an overall record of 9–2 and a mark of 6–1 in conference play, and finished as SWAC co-champions.

== Schedule ==
Date	Opponent	Site	Result	Attendance	Source
September 21	Alcorn A&M	Grambling Stadium; Grambling, LA	L 13–28		
September 28	vs. Morgan State*	Yankee Stadium; Bronx, NY	L 7–9	60,811	
October 5	at Prairie View A&M	Edward L. Blackshear Field; Prairie View, TX (rivalry)	W 22–14		
October 12	Tennessee State*	Grambling Stadium; Grambling, LA	W 30–21		
October 19	at Mississippi Valley State*	Magnolia Stadium; Itta Bena, MS	W 28–13		
October 26	Jackson State	Grambling Stadium; Grambling, LA	W 35–33	18,000	
November 2	at Texas Southern	Houston Astrodome; Houston, TX	W 28–18	35,465	
November 9	Arkansas AM&N	Grambling Stadium; Grambling, LA	W 46–20		
November 16	at Wiley	Maverick Stadium; Marshall, TX	W 37–6		
November 23	at Southern	University Stadium; Baton Rouge, LA (rivalry)	W 34–32		
December 7	vs. Sacramento State*	Rose Bowl; Pasadena, CA (Pasadena Bowl)	W 34–7	34,127	
*Non-conference game
