= 1968 Wiley Wildcats football team =

American college football season

1968 Wiley Wildcats football
- Conference: Southwestern Athletic Conference
- Record: 2–8 (0–7 SWAC)
- Head coach: Bob Moorman (3rd season)
- Home stadium: Maverick Stadium

1968 Southwestern Athletic Conference football standings
| | Conf. | | | | | Overall |
| Team | W | | L | | T | W | | L | | T |
|---|---|---|---|---|---|---|---|---|---|---|
| No. 3 Alcorn A&M + | 6 | – | 1 | – | 0 | 8 | – | 1 | – | 0 |
| Grambling + | 6 | – | 1 | – | 0 | 9 | – | 2 | – | 0 |
| Texas Southern + | 6 | – | 1 | – | 0 | 6 | – | 4 | – | 0 |
| Arkansas AM&N | 4 | – | 3 | – | 0 | 5 | – | 5 | – | 0 |
| Southern | 3 | – | 4 | – | 0 | 4 | – | 6 | – | 0 |
| Prairie View A&M | 2 | – | 5 | – | 0 | 4 | – | 6 | – | 0 |
| Jackson State | 1 | – | 6 | – | 0 | 3 | – | 6 | – | 0 |
| Wiley | 0 | – | 7 | – | 0 | 2 | – | 8 | – | 0 |
+ – Conference co-champions; Rankings from NAIA poll

The 1968 Wiley Wildcats football team represented Wiley College as a member of the Southwestern Athletic Conference (SWAC) during the 1968 NCAA College Division football season. Led by third-year head coach Bob Moorman, the Wildcats compiled an overall record of 2–8, with a conference record of 0–7, and finished eighth in the SWAC.

== Schedule ==
| Date | Opponent | Site | Result | Source |
|---|---|---|---|---|
| September 14 | Langston* | Maverick Stadium; Marshall, TX | W 20–10 | |
| September 21 | at Lincoln (MO)* | LU Field; Jefferson City, MO | W 7–6 | |
| September 28 | vs. Texas Southern | Public School Stadium; Galveston, TX | L 5–42 | |
| October 5 | at Bishop* | Bishop Stadium; Dallas, TX | L 13–16 | |
| October 12 | No. 16 Alcorn A&M | Maverick Stadium; Marshall, TX | L 5–60 | |
| October 19 | Arkansas AM&N^{†} | Maverick Stadium; Marshall, TX | L 19–25 | |
| November 2 | at Jackson State | Alumni Field; Jackson, MS | L 7–23 | |
| November 9 | at Southern | University Stadium; Baton Rouge, LA | L 9–22 | |
| November 16 | Grambling | Maverick Stadium; Marshall, TX | L 6–37 | |
| November 30 | Prairie View A&M | Maverick Stadium; Marshall, TX | L 15–22 | |
*Non-conference game; ^{†}Homecoming; Rankings from AP Poll released prior to the game
