= 1968 State College of Iowa Panthers football team =

American college football season

1968 State College of Iowa Panthers football
- Conference: North Central Conference
- Record: 5–5 (3–3 NCC)
- Head coach: Stan Sheriff (9th season)
- Home stadium: O. R. Latham Stadium

1968 North Central Conference football standings
	Conf.					Overall
Team	W		L		T	W		L		T
No. 1 North Dakota State $	6	–	0	–	0	10	–	0	–	0
No. 8 South Dakota	5	–	1	–	0	9	–	1	–	0
State College of Iowa	3	–	3	–	0	5	–	5	–	0
North Dakota	3	–	3	–	0	3	–	5	–	0
South Dakota State	2	–	4	–	0	4	–	6	–	0
Morningside	2	–	4	–	0	4	–	5	–	0
Augustana (SD)	0	–	6	–	0	2	–	7	–	0
$ – Conference champion; Rankings from AP small college poll

The 1968 State College of Iowa Panthers football team was an American football team that represented the State College of Iowa (now known as the University of Northern Iowa) as a member of the North Central Conference (NCC) during the 1968 NCAA College Division football season. In its ninth season under head coach Stan Sheriff, the team compiled a 5–5 record (3–3 in conference games) and finished in a tie for third place in the NCC.

The team's statistical leaders included junior fullback Dennis Kettner (826 rushing yards, 50 points scored), senior quarterback Phil Schooley (1,745 passing yards), and senior end Marv Johnson (586 receiving yards). Four S.C.I. players were named to the all-NCC team: halfback Tom Pinkham; offensive guard Dan Goddard; center Warren Woepking; and linebacker John Williams.

The team played its home games at O. R. Latham Stadium in Cedar Falls, Iowa.

== Schedule ==
Date	Opponent	Site	Result	Attendance
September 7	at Northern Michigan*	Marquette, MI	L 13–24	5,000
September 14	Western Illinois*	O. R. Latham Stadium; Cedar Falls, IA	W 33–6	7,000
September 21	at North Dakota	Memorial Stadium; Grand Forks, ND	W 14–10	8,000
September 28	at Augustana (SD)	Sioux Falls, SD	W 34–12	5,000
October 5	South Dakota State	O. R. Latham Stadium; Cedar Falls, IA	W 38–10	5,500
October 12	Drake*	O. R. Latham Stadium; Cedar Falls, IA	W 21–19	7,000
October 19	Morningside	O. R. Latham Stadium; Cedar Falls, IA	L 13–14	9,000
October 26	at South Dakota	Inman Field; Vermillion, SD	L 7–13	7,000
November 2	North Dakota State	O. R. Latham Stadium; Cedar Falls, IA	L 15–31	8,000
November 9	at Eastern Michigan*	Briggs Field; Ypsilanti, MI	L 7–34	4,000
*Non-conference game
