= 1968 Cal State Hayward Pioneers football team =

American college football season

1968 Cal State Hayward Pioneers football
- Conference: Far Western Conference
- Record: 5–4–1 (1–4–1 FWC)
- Head coach: Les Davis (3rd season)
- Home stadium: Pioneer Stadium

1968 Far Western Conference football standings
	Conf.					Overall
Team	W		L		T	W		L		T
No. 16 AP / #10 UPI Humboldt State $	6	–	0	–	0	10	–	1	–	0
Sacramento State	4	–	2	–	0	8	–	3	–	0
UC Davis	3	–	3	–	0	5	–	4	–	0
San Francisco State	3	–	3	–	0	5	–	5	–	0
Chico State	2	–	4	–	0	5	–	5	–	0
Cal State Hayward	1	–	4	–	1	5	–	4	–	1
Nevada	1	–	4	–	1	3	–	6	–	1
$ – Conference champion; Rankings from small college polls

The 1968 Cal State Hayward Pioneers football team represented California State College at Hayward—now known California State University, East Bay—as a member of the Far Western Conference (FWC) during the 1968 NCAA College Division football season. Led by third-year head coach Les Davis, Cal State Hayward compiled an overall record of 5–4–1 with a mark of 1–4–1 in conference play, tying for sixth place in the FWC. The team was outscored by its opponents 262 to 165 for the season. The Pioneers played home games at Pioneer Stadium in Hayward, California.

== Schedule ==
Date	Opponent	Site	Result	Attendance	Source
September 21	Cal Poly Pomona*	Pioneer Stadium; Hayward, CA	W 61–23	2,900–3,000	
September 28	at Occidental*	D.W. Patterson Field; Los Angeles, CA	W 33–27	1,300	
October 4	at UC Davis	Toomey Field; Davis, CA	W 30–14	6,000	
October 12	San Francisco State	Pioneer Stadium; Hayward, CA	L 7–10	4,500–7,200	
October 19	Nevada	Pioneer Stadium; Hayward, CA	T 7–7	3,800	
October 26	at Chico State	College Field; Chico, CA	L 21–24	7,000–8,000	
November 2	San Francisco*	Pioneer Stadium; Hayward, CA	W 33–0	1,800	
November 9	Sacramento State	Pioneer Stadium; Hayward, CA	L 14–16	1,500–2,000	
November 16	at No. T–19 Humboldt State	Redwood Bowl; Arcata, CA	L 16–30	6,500	
November 23	at UC Riverside*	Highlander Stadium; Riverside, CA	W 40–14	3,500	
*Non-conference game; Rankings from AP Poll released prior to the game
