= 1968 Mississippi Valley State Delta Devils football team =

American college football season

1968 Mississippi Valley State Delta Devils football
- Conference: Independent
- Record: 1–7
- Head coach: William Glosson (1st season)
- Home stadium: Magnolia Stadium

1968 NCAA College Division independents football records
	Conf.			Overall
Team	W	L	T	W		L		T
No. 2 San Diego State		–		9	–	0	–	1
No. 3 Chattanooga		–		9	–	1	–	0
Indiana State		–		9	–	1	–	0
Indiana (PA)		–		9	–	1	–	0
Nevada Southern		–		8	–	1	–	0
Ashland		–		8	–	2	–	0
No. 7 Eastern Michigan		–		8	–	2	–	0
Lincoln (MO)		–		8	–	2	–	0
St. Norbert		–		6	–	2	–	1
Tennessee State		–		6	–	2	–	1
UC Riverside		–		6	–	2	–	1
Hawaii		–		7	–	3	–	0
No. 14 Tampa		–		7	–	3	–	0
No. 17 Akron		–		7	–	3	–	1
Northeastern		–		6	–	3	–	0
Southern Illinois		–		6	–	3	–	0
Cortland		–		5	–	3	–	0
Boston University		–		5	–	3	–	1
Northern Arizona		–		6	–	4	–	0
Pacific (CA)		–		6	–	4	–	0
Samford		–		6	–	4	–	0
Northern Michigan		–		5	–	4	–	0
Parsons		–		5	–	4	–	0
Wheaton (IL)		–		5	–	4	–	0
Drake		–		5	–	5	–	0
UC Santa Barbara		–		4	–	4	–	1
Santa Clara		–		4	–	5	–	0
Portland State		–		4	–	6	–	0
Wayne State (MI)		–		3	–	6	–	0
Wabash		–		3	–	6	–	0
Colorado College		–		2	–	6	–	0
Kentucky State		–		2	–	7	–	0
Milwaukee		–		2	–	7	–	0
Lake Forest		–		2	–	8	–	0
Northern Illinois		–		2	–	8	–	0
Mississippi Valley State		–		1	–	7	–	0
UC San Diego		–		0	–	7	–	0
Rose Poly		–		0	–	8	–	0
Cal Poly Pomona		–		0	–	10	–	0
Rankings from AP small college poll

The 1968 Mississippi Valley State Delta Devils football team represented Mississippi Valley State College (now known as Mississippi Valley State University) as an independent school during the 1968 NCAA College Division football season. Led by first-year head coach William Glosson, the Delta Devils compiled an overall record of 1–7.

== Schedule ==
Date	Opponent	Site	Result	Attendance	Source
September 21	at Arkansas AM&N	Pumphrey Stadium; Pine Bluff, AR	L 6–49		
September 28	at Kentucky State	Thorobred Field; Frankfort, KY	L 7–13		
October 5	Southern	Magnolia Stadium; Itta Bena, MS	L 0–27		
October 19	Grambling	Magnolia Stadium; Itta Bena, MS	L 13–28		
November 2	at Prairie View A&M	Edward L. Blackshear Field; Prairie View, TX	L 7–19		
November 9	No. 19 Alcorn A&M	Magnolia Stadium; Itta Bena, MS	L 0–40	800	
November 16	Bethune–Cookman	Magnolia Stadium; Itta Bena, MS	W 26–6		
November 23	at Jackson State	Mississippi Veterans Memorial Stadium; Jackson, MS	L 7–32	10,763	
Rankings from UPI Poll released prior to the game
