= 1968 Cal State Los Angeles Diablos football team =

American college football season

1968 Cal State Los Angeles Diablos football
- Conference: California Collegiate Athletic Association
- Record: 6–3 (2–2 CCAA)
- Head coach: Jim Williams (3rd season)
- Home stadium: Rose Bowl

1968 California Collegiate Athletic Association football standings
| | Conf. | | | | | Overall |
| Team | W | | L | | T | W | | L | | T |
|---|---|---|---|---|---|---|---|---|---|---|
| No. 18 Fresno State $ | 4 | – | 0 | – | 0 | 7 | – | 4 | – | 0 |
| Cal Poly | 2 | – | 2 | – | 0 | 7 | – | 3 | – | 0 |
| Cal State Los Angeles | 2 | – | 2 | – | 0 | 6 | – | 3 | – | 0 |
| Valley State | 1 | – | 3 | – | 0 | 5 | – | 4 | – | 0 |
| Long Beach State | 1 | – | 3 | – | 0 | 3 | – | 7 | – | 0 |
$ – Conference champion; Rankings from UPI small college poll

The 1968 Cal State Los Angeles Diablos football team represented California State College at Los Angeles—now known as California State University, Los Angeles—as a member of the California Collegiate Athletic Association (CCAA) during the 1968 NCAA College Division football season. Led by third-year head coach Jim Williams, Cal State Los Angeles compiled an overall record of 6–3 with a mark of 2–2 in conference play, tying for second place in the CCAA. The Diablos played home games at the Rose Bowl in Pasadena, California.

== Schedule ==
| Date | Opponent | Site | Result | Attendance | Source |
|---|---|---|---|---|---|
| September 28 | at Cal Western* | Balboa Stadium; San Diego, CA | W 55–20 | 2,200 | |
| October 5 | Parsons (IA)* | Rose Bowl; Pasadena, CA | W 29–12 | 2,100–2,124 | |
| October 12 | Cal Poly Pomona* | Rose Bowl; Pasadena, CA | W 63–28 | 2,171–2,200 | |
| October 19 | at No. 1 San Diego State* | San Diego Stadium; San Diego, CA | L 14–37 | 44,169–44,900 | |
| October 25 | Fresno State | Rose Bowl; Pasadena, CA | L 20–42 | 1,800–1,815 | |
| November 2 | Hawaii* | Rose Bowl; Pasadena, CA | W 46–33 | 2,800–2,914 | |
| November 9 | at Cal Poly | Mustang Stadium; San Luis Obispo, CA | L 20–22 | 3,800–3,900 | |
| November 16 | Long Beach State | Rose Bowl; Pasadena, CA | W 46–29 | 1,800–2,078 | |
| November 23 | at Valley State | Birmingham High School; Van Nuys, CA | W 42–27 | 7,200–7,400 | |
*Non-conference game; Rankings from AP Poll released prior to the game
