= 1968 Fresno State Bulldogs football team =

American college football season

1968 Fresno State Bulldogs football

CCAA champion

Camellia Bowl, L 14–29 vs. Humboldt State
- Conference: California Collegiate Athletic Association
- Record: 7–4 (4–0 CCAA)
- Head coach: Darryl Rogers (3rd season)
- Defensive coordinator: Bob Padilla (1st season)
- Home stadium: Ratcliffe Stadium

1968 California Collegiate Athletic Association football standings
	Conf.					Overall
Team	W		L		T	W		L		T
No. 18 Fresno State $	4	–	0	–	0	7	–	4	–	0
Cal Poly	2	–	2	–	0	7	–	3	–	0
Cal State Los Angeles	2	–	2	–	0	6	–	3	–	0
Valley State	1	–	3	–	0	5	–	4	–	0
Long Beach State	1	–	3	–	0	3	–	7	–	0
$ – Conference champion; Rankings from UPI small college poll

The 1968 Fresno State Bulldogs football team represented Fresno State College—now known as California State University, Fresno—as a member of the California Collegiate Athletic Association (CCAA) during the 1968 NCAA College Division football season. Led by third-year head coach Darryl Rogers, Fresno State compiled an overall record of 7–4 with a mark of 4–0 in conference play, winning the CCAA title. As champion, the Bulldogs qualified for the 1968 Camellia Bowl, which was played in Sacramento, California against the champion of the Far Western Conference, the Humboldt State Lumberjacks. Humboldt State prevailed, 29–14.

The Bulldogs played home games at Ratcliffe Stadium on the campus of Fresno City College in Fresno, California. This was the last season Fresno State competed in the NCAA College Division and the CCAA. The following year, Bulldogs moved to the NCAA University Division and became a charter member of the Pacific Coast Athletic Association (PCAA).

== Schedule ==
Date	Opponent	Site	Result	Attendance	Source
September 21	Idaho State*	Ratcliffe Stadium; Fresno, CA	L 23–38	8,615	
September 28	at San Jose State*	Spartan Stadium; San Jose, CA (rivalry)	L 21–25	9,500	
October 5	at Portland State*	Civic Stadium; Portland, OR	W 30–13		
October 12	Valley State	Ratcliffe Stadium; Fresno, CA	W 35–12	6,346–6,500	
October 19	Cal Poly	Ratcliffe Stadium; Fresno, CA	W 17–0	9,500–10,071	
October 25	Cal State Los Angeles	Rose Bowl; Pasadena, CA	W 42–20	1,815	
November 2	at No. 1 San Diego State*	San Diego Stadium; San Diego, CA (rivalry)	L 12–42	24,387	
November 9	Long Beach State	Ratcliffe Stadium; Fresno, CA	W 34–28	8,201	
November 16	Montana State*	Ratcliffe Stadium; Fresno, CA	W 31–16	7,245	
November 23	Pacific (CA)*	Ratcliffe Stadium; Fresno, CA	W 10–3	7,752	
December 14	Humboldt State*	Hughes Stadium; Sacramento, CA (Camellia Bowl)	L 14–29	8,168	
*Non-conference game; Rankings from AP Poll released prior to the game

== Team players in the NFL ==
The following were selected in the 1969 NFL/AFL draft.

Player	Position	Round	Overall	NFL team
John Stahl	Guard	16	407	Detroit Lions
