= 1968 Eastern Michigan Hurons football team =

American college football season

1968 Eastern Michigan Hurons football
- Conference: Independent
- Record: 8–2
- Head coach: Dan Boisture (2nd season)
- Captains: Ivory Hood; John Schmidt
- Home stadium: Briggs Field

1968 NCAA College Division independents football records
	Conf.			Overall
Team	W	L	T	W		L		T
No. 2 San Diego State		–		9	–	0	–	1
No. 3 Chattanooga		–		9	–	1	–	0
Indiana State		–		9	–	1	–	0
Indiana (PA)		–		9	–	1	–	0
Nevada Southern		–		8	–	1	–	0
Ashland		–		8	–	2	–	0
No. 7 Eastern Michigan		–		8	–	2	–	0
Lincoln (MO)		–		8	–	2	–	0
St. Norbert		–		6	–	2	–	1
Tennessee State		–		6	–	2	–	1
UC Riverside		–		6	–	2	–	1
Hawaii		–		7	–	3	–	0
No. 14 Tampa		–		7	–	3	–	0
No. 17 Akron		–		7	–	3	–	1
Northeastern		–		6	–	3	–	0
Southern Illinois		–		6	–	3	–	0
Cortland		–		5	–	3	–	0
Boston University		–		5	–	3	–	1
Northern Arizona		–		6	–	4	–	0
Pacific (CA)		–		6	–	4	–	0
Samford		–		6	–	4	–	0
Northern Michigan		–		5	–	4	–	0
Parsons		–		5	–	4	–	0
Wheaton (IL)		–		5	–	4	–	0
Drake		–		5	–	5	–	0
UC Santa Barbara		–		4	–	4	–	1
Santa Clara		–		4	–	5	–	0
Portland State		–		4	–	6	–	0
Illinois College		–		2	–	4	–	2
Wayne State (MI)		–		3	–	6	–	0
Wabash		–		3	–	6	–	0
Colorado College		–		2	–	6	–	0
Kentucky State		–		2	–	7	–	0
Milwaukee		–		2	–	7	–	0
Lake Forest		–		2	–	8	–	0
Northern Illinois		–		2	–	8	–	0
Mississippi Valley State		–		1	–	7	–	0
UC San Diego		–		0	–	7	–	0
Rose Poly		–		0	–	8	–	0
Cal Poly Pomona		–		0	–	10	–	0
Rankings from AP small college poll

The 1968 Eastern Michigan Hurons football team represented Eastern Michigan University as an independent during the 1968 NCAA College Division football season. In their second season under head coach Dan Boisture, the Hurons compiled an 8–2 record and outscored their opponents, 248 to 91. On November 2, 1968, the Hurons played their final homecoming day game at Walter O. Briggs Field, which had been the team's home since 1938. Playing before a record crowd of 15,451, the Hurons defeated Northeastern, 41–0. On November 9, 1968, the Hurons played their final game at Briggs Field, a 34-7 victory over Northern Iowa. Briggs Field was razed in 1972 to make room for expanded parking facilities.

== Schedule ==
Date	Opponent	Rank	Site	Result	Attendance	Source
September 14	Morningside		Briggs Field; Ypsilanti, MI	W 46–16		
September 21	Southern Connecticut		Briggs Field; Ypsilanti, MI	W 40–0		
September 28	at Arkansas State	No. T–18	Kays Stadium; Jonesboro, AR	L 7–26	7,800	
October 5	at No. T–17 Akron		Rubber Bowl; Akron, OH	W 16–7	2,051	
October 12	at Ball State		Ball State Stadium; Muncie, IN	W 43–7	16,850–17,700	
October 19	at Tampa	No. 18	Tampa Stadium; Tampa, FL	L 0–21		
October 26	Kentucky State		Briggs Field; Ypsilanti, MI	W 7–0		
November 2	Northeastern		Briggs Field; Ypsilanti, MI	W 41–0		
November 9	State College of Iowa		Briggs Field; Ypsilanti, MI	W 34–7	4,000	
November 16	at Wittenberg		Springfield, OH	W 14–7		
Rankings from AP Poll released prior to the game
