= 1968 South Dakota Coyotes football team =

American college football season

1968 South Dakota Coyotes football
- Conference: North Central Conference
- Record: 9–1 (5–1 NCC)
- Head coach: Joe Salem (3rd season)
- Home stadium: Inman Field

1968 North Central Conference football standings
	Conf.					Overall
Team	W		L		T	W		L		T
No. 1 North Dakota State $	6	–	0	–	0	10	–	0	–	0
No. 8 South Dakota	5	–	1	–	0	9	–	1	–	0
State College of Iowa	3	–	3	–	0	5	–	5	–	0
North Dakota	3	–	3	–	0	3	–	5	–	0
South Dakota State	2	–	4	–	0	4	–	6	–	0
Morningside	2	–	4	–	0	4	–	5	–	0
Augustana (SD)	0	–	6	–	0	2	–	7	–	0
$ – Conference champion; Rankings from AP small college poll

The 1968 South Dakota Coyotes football team was an American football team that represented the University of South Dakota in the North Central Conference (NCC) during the 1968 NCAA College Division football season. In its third season under head coach Joe Salem, the team compiled a 9–1 record (5–1 against NCC opponents), finished in second place out of seven teams in the NCC, and outscored opponents by a total of 299 to 173. The team played its home games at Inman Field in Vermillion, South Dakota.

== Schedule ==
Date	Opponent	Rank	Site	Result	Attendance	Source
September 14	at Mankato State*		Blakeslee Stadium; Mankato, MN	W 28–14	3,500	
September 21	Montana*		Inman Field; Vermillion, SD	W 21–0	9,000–9,500	
September 28	at North Dakota		Memorial Stadium; Grand Forks, ND (Sitting Bull Trophy)	W 17–16	5,000–5,550	
October 5	No. 2 North Dakota State		Inman Field; Vermillion, SD	L 13–35	4,500	
October 12	at Morningside		Sioux City, IA	W 35–13	9,000	
October 19	South Dakota State		Inman Field; Vermillion, SD (rivalry)	W 55–32	10,000	
October 26	State College of Iowa		Inman Field; Vermillion, SD	W 13–7	7,000	
November 2	Drake*		Inman Field; Vermillion, SD	W 49–28	5,000	
November 9	at Augustana (SD)		Howard Wood Field; Sioux Falls, SD	W 33–14	4,000	
November 16	at Colorado State–Greeley*	No. 14	Jackson Field; Greeley, CO	W 35–14	1,114	
*Non-conference game; Rankings from AP Poll released prior to the game
