= 1968 Long Beach State 49ers football team =

American college football season

1968 Long Beach State 49ers football
- Conference: California Collegiate Athletic Association
- Record: 3–7 (1–3 CCAA)
- Head coach: Don Reed (11th season)
- Home stadium: Veterans Memorial Stadium

1968 California Collegiate Athletic Association football standings
	Conf.					Overall
Team	W		L		T	W		L		T
No. 18 Fresno State $	4	–	0	–	0	7	–	4	–	0
Cal Poly	2	–	2	–	0	7	–	3	–	0
Cal State Los Angeles	2	–	2	–	0	6	–	3	–	0
Valley State	1	–	3	–	0	5	–	4	–	0
Long Beach State	1	–	3	–	0	3	–	7	–	0
$ – Conference champion; Rankings from UPI small college poll

The 1968 Long Beach State 49ers football team represented California State College, Long Beach—now known as California State University, Long Beach—as a member of the California Collegiate Athletic Association (CCAA) during the 1968 NCAA College Division football season. Led by Don Reed in his 11th and final season as head coach, the 49ers compiled an overall record of 3–7 with a mark of 1–4 in conference play, tying for fourth place in the CCAA. The team played home games at Veterans Memorial Stadium adjacent to the campus of Long Beach City College in Long Beach, California.

== Schedule ==
Date	Opponent	Site	Result	Attendance	Source
September 21	at Northern Arizona*	Lumberjack Stadium; Flagstaff, AZ	L 20–26	7,000	
September 27	Texas A&I*	Veterans Memorial Stadium; Long Beach, CA	L 7–35	3,763	
October 5	at Valley State	Birmingham High School; Van Nuys, CA	L 20–21	5,413	
October 12	at UTEP*	Sun Bowl; El Paso, TX	W 22–21	21,120	
October 19	UC Santa Barbara*	Veterans Memorial Stadium; Long Beach, CA	L 21–42	5,000	
October 26	at Santa Clara*	Stevens Stadium; Santa Clara, CA	L 21–27	7,650	
November 2	Cal Poly	Veterans Memorial Stadium; Long Beach, CA	W 12–7	5,128	
November 9	at Fresno State	Ratcliffe Stadium; Fresno, CA	L 28–34	8,201	
November 16	at Cal State Los Angeles	Rose Bowl; Pasadena, CA	L 29–46	1,800–2,078	
November 23	San Francisco State*	Veterans Memorial Stadium; Long Beach, CA	W 28–14		
*Non-conference game
