= 1968 Humboldt State Lumberjacks football team =

American college football season

1968 Humboldt State Lumberjacks football

FWC champion Camellia Bowl champion College Division western region champion

Camellia Bowl, W 29–14 vs. Fresno State
- Conference: Far Western Conference

Ranking
- Coaches: No. 10 (UPI small college)
- AP: No. 16 (AP small college)
- Record: 10–1 (6–0 FWC)
- Head coach: Bud Van Deren (3rd season)
- Home stadium: Redwood Bowl

1968 Far Western Conference football standings
	Conf.					Overall
Team	W		L		T	W		L		T
No. 16 AP / #10 UPI Humboldt State $	6	–	0	–	0	10	–	1	–	0
Sacramento State	4	–	2	–	0	8	–	3	–	0
UC Davis	3	–	3	–	0	5	–	4	–	0
San Francisco State	3	–	3	–	0	5	–	5	–	0
Chico State	2	–	4	–	0	5	–	5	–	0
Cal State Hayward	1	–	4	–	1	5	–	4	–	1
Nevada	1	–	4	–	1	3	–	6	–	1
$ – Conference champion; Rankings from small college polls

The 1968 Humboldt State Lumberjacks football team represented Humboldt State College—now known as California State Polytechnic University, Humboldt—as a member of the Far Western Conference (FWC) during the 1968 NCAA College Division football season. Led by third-year head coach Bud Van Deren, the Lumberjacks compiled an overall record of 10–1 with a mark of 6–0 in conference play, winning the FWC title. Humboldt State finished the regular season ranked No. 16 in the AP small college poll and No. 10 in the UPI small college poll. At the end of the season the Lumberjacks were invited to the Camellia Bowl. There was no playoff in the NCAA College Division at this time, so the Camellia Bowl was one of four regional championship games in the division. Humboldt State faced California Collegiate Athletic Association (CCAA) champion Fresno State, and defeated the Bulldogs, 29–14, to win the western region title. The team outscored its opponents 375 to 138 for the season. Humboldt State played home games at the Redwood Bowl in Arcata, California.

== Schedule ==
Date	Time	Opponent	Rank	Site	Result	Attendance	Source
September 21		at Hawaii*		Honolulu Stadium; Honolulu, HI	L 20–34	15,478	
September 28		Oregon Tech*		Redwood Bowl; Arcata, CA	W 43–0	4,300	
October 5	8:00 p.m.	at Sacramento State		Charles C. Hughes Stadium; Sacramento, CA	W 20–13	6,200–7,500	
October 12		Central Washington*		Redwood Bowl; Arcata, CA	W 50–0	4,500	
October 19		at UC Davis		Toomey Field; Davis, CA	W 29–8	4,000	
October 26		San Francisco State		Redwood Bowl; Arcata, CA	W 37–20	8,250	
November 2		at Nevada		Mackay Stadium; Reno, NV	W 30–17	1,200–3,000	
November 9		Chico State	No. 20 UPI	Redwood Bowl; Arcata, CA	W 57–7	6,000–6,500	
November 16		Cal State Hayward	No. T–18 AP / 13 UPI	Redwood Bowl; Arcata, CA	W 30–14	6,500	
November 23		at Cal Poly Pomona*	No. 18 AP / 12 UPI	Kellogg Field; Pomona, CA	W 40–9	1,500–3,500	
December 14		vs. No. 18 UPI Fresno State*	No. 16 AP / 10 UPI	Charles C. Hughes Stadium; Sacramento, CA (Camellia Bowl)	W 29–14	8,168	
*Non-conference game; Rankings from AP/UPI small college Poll released prior to the game
