= 1968 Nevada Wolf Pack football team =

American college football season

1968 Nevada Wolf Pack football
- Conference: Far Western Conference
- Record: 3–6–1 (1–4–1 FWC)
- Head coach: Dick Trachok (10th season)
- Home stadium: Mackay Stadium

1968 Far Western Conference football standings
| | Conf. | | | | | Overall |
| Team | W | | L | | T | W | | L | | T |
|---|---|---|---|---|---|---|---|---|---|---|
| No. 16 AP / #10 UPI Humboldt State $ | 6 | – | 0 | – | 0 | 10 | – | 1 | – | 0 |
| Sacramento State | 4 | – | 2 | – | 0 | 8 | – | 3 | – | 0 |
| UC Davis | 3 | – | 3 | – | 0 | 5 | – | 4 | – | 0 |
| San Francisco State | 3 | – | 3 | – | 0 | 5 | – | 5 | – | 0 |
| Chico State | 2 | – | 4 | – | 0 | 5 | – | 5 | – | 0 |
| Cal State Hayward | 1 | – | 4 | – | 1 | 5 | – | 4 | – | 1 |
| Nevada | 1 | – | 4 | – | 1 | 3 | – | 6 | – | 1 |
$ – Conference champion; Rankings from small college polls

The 1968 Nevada Wolf Pack football team represented the University of Nevada, Reno as a member of the Far Western Conference (FWC) during the 1968 NCAA College Division football season. Led by Dick Trachok in his tenth and final season as head coach, the Wolf Pack compiled an overall record of 3–6–1 with a mark of 1–4–1 in conference play, tying for sixth place in the FWC. The team played home games at Mackay Stadium in Reno, Nevada.

Trachok resigned after the season to take the job as Nevada's athletic director. This was the Wolf Pack's last year as a member of the FWC as they went independent for the 1969 season.

== Schedule ==
| Date | Opponent | Site | Result | Attendance | Source |
|---|---|---|---|---|---|
| September 21 | at Willamette* | McCulloch Stadium; Salem, OR | L 13–40 | | |
| September 28 | UC Santa Barbara* | Mackay Stadium; Reno, NV | W 17–13 | 3,000–5,000 | |
| October 5 | San Francisco* | Mackay Stadium; Reno, NV | W 48–13 | 3,400–5,000 | |
| October 12 | at Chico State | College Field; Chico, CA | L 15–20 | 3,000 | |
| October 19 | at Cal State Hayward | Pioneer Stadium; Hayward, CA | T 7–7 | 3,800 | |
| October 26 | Sacramento State^{†} | Mackay Stadium; Reno, NV | L 14–17 | 5,000–6,200 | |
| November 2 | Humboldt State | Mackay Stadium; Reno, NV | L 17–20 | 1,200–3,000 | |
| November 9 | at UC Davis | Toomey Field; Davis, CA | L 24–25 | 5,500 | |
| November 16 | San Francisco State | Mackay Stadium; Reno, NV | W 21–7 | 1,000–2,000 | |
| November 23 | at Hawaii* | Honolulu Stadium; Honolulu, HI | L 0–21 | 8,000–14,005 | |
*Non-conference game; ^{†}Homecoming

== Personnel ==
1968 Nevada Wolf Pack football team roster
Players
Coaches
Offense

| Pos. | # | Name | Class |
|---|---|---|---|
| QB | 14 | John Barnes | Jr |
| OL | 75 | Terry Hermeling | Jr |

Defense

| Pos. | # | Name | Class |

Special teams

| Pos. | # | Name | Class |

Head coach

- Dick Trachok

Coordinators/assistant coaches

Legend

- (C) Team captain
- (S) Suspended
- (I) Ineligible
- Injured
- Redshirt
