= Neale Stadium =

Athletic stadium in Moscow, Idaho

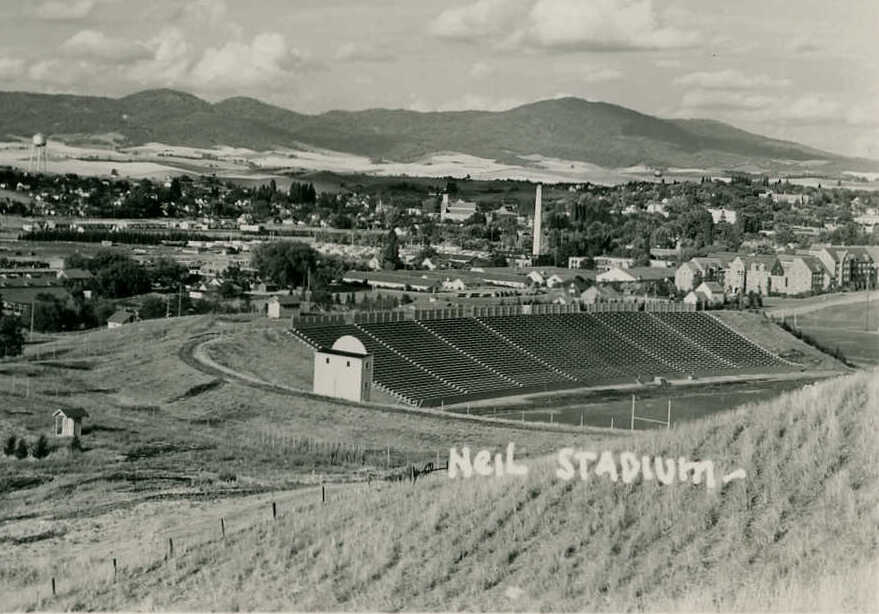
- View from southwest, circa 1940s

- Location in the United States Location in Idaho
- Interactive map of Neale Stadium
- Address: S. Rayburn Street
- Location: University of Idaho; Moscow, Idaho, U.S.
- Coordinates: 46.726°N 117.017°W
- Elevation: 2,610 ft (800 m) AMSL
- Owner: University of Idaho
- Operator: University of Idaho
- Capacity: 16,000 (approx.)
- Surface: Natural grass track – cinder
- Record attendance: 22,500 (approx.) vs. Washington State (Battle of the Palouse); October 4, 1947

Construction
- Groundbreaking: October 1936
- Opened: September 25, 1937; 89 years ago
- Closed: 1969 – summer Fire: south grandstand November 23, 1969; 56 years ago
- Demolished: 1970–71
- Cost: $47,770 ($1.07 million in 2025)

Tenants
- Idaho Vandals (NCAA) (1937–1968)

Neale Stadium was an outdoor athletic stadium located on the campus of the University of Idaho in Moscow, Idaho. Opened 89 years ago in 1937 for college football, it was used for over three decades, through the 1968 football season; the track team moved to the venue in the late 1940s.

Its replacement, the enclosed Kibbie Dome, currently occupies the same site on the west end of campus; the outdoor track is adjacent to the west.

== History ==
Neale Stadium was the home field for the Idaho Vandals of the Pacific Coast Conference (PCC) (and later the Big Sky) from 1937 through 1968. In addition to football, it was also used for track and field events after World War II. Approval for the stadium was granted by the board of regents in August 1936, and grading began shortly after. During construction the next spring, it was named for Mervin G. Neale, the university's president from 1930 to 1937. Its first game was the season-opener in 1937, a 7–6 upset win over conference foe Oregon State on September 25.

Neale Stadium was an earthen horseshoe bowl, opening to the east toward campus. The wooden grandstands were along the sidelines only, with approximately thirty rows of bench seating. The unlit stadium included the quarter-mile (402 m) cinder running track, and the white wooden scoreboard was located at the west end, on the rim of the unseated bowl. (photo) The Kibbie Dome currently occupies the site in the same east-west configuration, unorthodox for football.

There were no locker room facilities at the venue, the teams dressed in the Memorial Gymnasium well to the east. Locker rooms were finally installed in 1982, with the East End Addition to the Kibbie Dome. The press box was above the south sideline's grandstand and the elevation of the playing field was 2,610 feet (795 m) above sea level.

Unknown at the time, the final football season at Neale was 58 years ago in 1968, when it hosted two conference games, both high-scoring, close wins. Longtime rival Montana was defeated in October, and Weber State in early November.

Before Neale Stadium, football was played at MacLean Field, the large athletic field between the Mem Gym and the Shattuck Arboretum, behind (west of) the Administration Building. It was named for James Alexander MacLean, the university president from 1900 to 1913. The baseball infield was originally in the southwest corner, with the football field set north-south, in the outfield. After Neale Stadium opened, the baseball infield was moved to the northeast corner of MacLean, on the site of the current College of Education building. The primary spectator area was on the slope along the east sideline (later the third base line). (1921 photo – (campus photo - circa 1940) The former infield in the southwest became the site of the utilitarian Field House (1948–75), succeeded by three outdoor tennis courts (south). Track and field remained at MacLean until the late 1940s, then moved west to Neale when its running track was finally developed.

Prior to 1914, the football stadium was off-campus at the north end of Moscow, at the southwest corner of Main and "E" Streets.

== Battle of the Palouse ==
In 1947, an estimated 22,500 attended the Battle of the Palouse game with Washington State on October 4, won 7–0 by the Cougars. At the time it was the largest-ever crowd on the Palouse and the state of Idaho.

Idaho's only victory over WSU at Neale Stadium came in 1964, before another overflow crowd of 18,600. The Vandals opened up a 21–0 lead in the third quarter with sophomore fullback "Thunder Ray" McDonald running the ball and won convincingly; a late Cougar touchdown made the final score 28–13. After a 17–13 Idaho win in 1965 at Rogers Field in Pullman, a third straight win over the Cougars was nearly in hand at Neale in 1966 on a cold and sloppy afternoon, with Idaho playing ball control in the mudbath with a 7–0 lead in the fourth quarter. Two Vandal fumbles led to two quick Cougar touchdowns and a 14–7 WSU road win before 16,500. The 1966 game was the last UI-WSU contest in Neale Stadium and the last in the state of Idaho. All 26 games with WSU since 1967 have been played in Washington, with 22 in Pullman, three in Spokane, and one in Seattle.

== Condemned in 1969 ==
The wooden grandstands of Neale Stadium were condemned for safety reasons during the summer of 1969, due to soil erosion underneath the grandstands. Idaho used WSU's Rogers Field, in nearby Pullman, Washington, for their limited home schedule in 1969 (three Palouse home games), and was planning to do the same in 1970, with four home games scheduled. Idle for football for a year, a suspected arson late on Sunday, November 23, 1969, burned the central portion of the south grandstand and press box at Neale Stadium.

Less than five months later, a similar fire occurred at Rogers Field in April 1970. Also a suspected arson, it severely damaged the south grandstand and press box of Pullman's wooden venue. This reduction in capacity forced WSU to play all of its home schedule in 1970 and 1971 at Joe Albi Stadium in Spokane, but Idaho continued to play its games at Rogers Field in 1970, using the north grandstand and temporary seating. The two teams met in the so-called "Displaced Bowl" in Spokane on September 19, handily won by WSU.

== Idaho Stadium – 1971 ==
In 1971, the remainder of the south grandstand of Rogers Field at WSU was demolished to construct Martin Stadium, which opened the following year. Weather delayed construction in the spring and Idaho's new stadium was a month behind schedule, which forced the Vandals to play their first two home games of the 1971 season away from the Palouse. The first was the season-opener at the year-old Bronco Stadium in Boise in the first-ever meeting with Boise State College; the "visiting" Broncos pulled off the 42–14 upset before 16,123 on September 11 for an instant rivalry. The second was at Joe Albi Stadium in Spokane on September 25, a 10–0 victory over Colorado State.

Vandal football finally returned to campus two weeks later, when the new concrete "Idaho Stadium" opened on October 9, built on the site of Neale Stadium. With the first game on campus in nearly three years, the Vandals responded with a 40–3 victory over Idaho State. The playing field was natural grass in 1971; synthetic Tartan Turf by 3M was installed in 1972 and the stadium was fully enclosed in September 1975 to become the Kibbie Dome.

A new all-weather outdoor track and field venue was built west of the stadium in 1971, and it held its first meet in April 1972. It was named for gold medalist decathlete Dan O'Brien following the 1996 Summer Olympics, and underwent a $2.5 million renovation in 2011–12.

== Noted Vandals ==
Among the Vandal greats who played at Neale Stadium were Jerry Kramer and Wayne Walker, both future NFL all-stars and selected early in the 1958 NFL draft.
