= Dornblaser Field =

Former athletic stadium in Missoula, MT

University of Montana Dornblaser Field
- Interactive map of University of Montana; Dornblaser Field
- Full name: Dornblaser Field
- Location: Higgins & South Streets – II; Missoula, Montana
- Owner: University of Montana
- Capacity: 12,500
- Surface: natural grass

Construction
- Opened: 1968 – II; 1912 – I
- Closed: 1986 – II (football); 1967 – I

Tenants
- Montana Grizzlies football (1968–1986) – II (1912–1967) – I

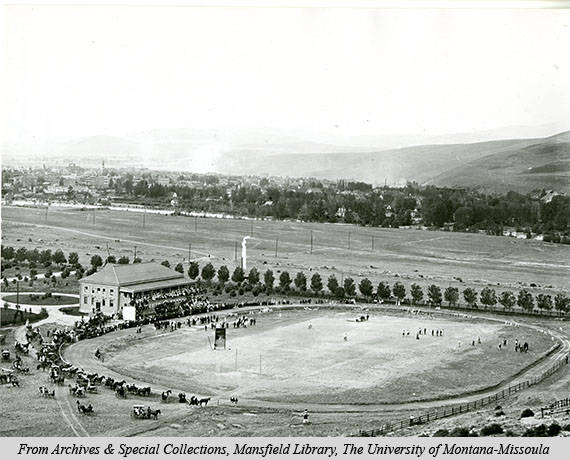
High-angle view of the University of Montana's original Dornblaser Field, circa 1906.

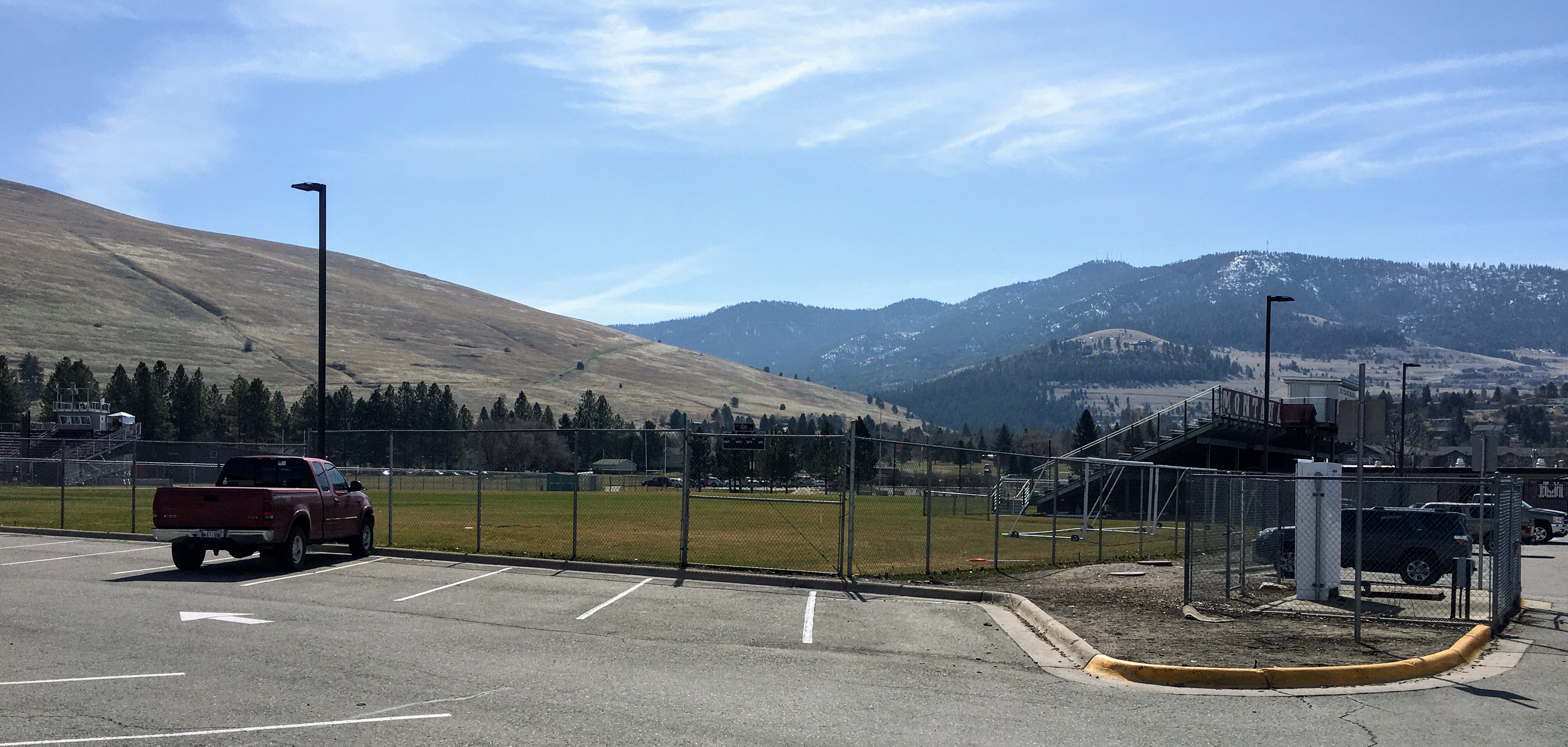
Dornblaser Field at the University of Montana in Missoula, Montana, in 2021.

Missoula (the United States)

Dornblaser Field is the name of two outdoor athletic stadiums in the western United States, located in Missoula, Montana. Both were former home fields of the University of Montana Grizzlies football teams and were named for Paul Dornblaser, a captain of the football team in 1912 who was killed in World War I. Both stadiums had conventional north–south orientations at an approximate elevation of 3,200 feet (980 m) above sea level.

The first ivy-covered stone venue opened 114 years ago in 1912 on campus at the base of Mount Sentinel and east of University Hall. Its southwestern portion (46.859°N 113.983°W) is now the location of the Mansfield Library, completed in 1978. It hosted the Griz until an off-campus stadium opened in 1968, a "temporary" stadium about a mile (1.6 km) southwest which held 12,500 spectators in steel and wood bleachers. The second stadium was replaced for football when Washington–Grizzly Stadium opened in October 1986, back on campus, east of Dahlberg Arena.

The Campbell ballpark for baseball was adjacent to the north end of Dornblaser and aligned southeast (home plate to center field); the Grizzly baseball program was dropped after the 1972 season.

Recently renovated, Dornblaser Field continues as the home venue for the Grizzlies' track and field teams.
