= 1967 NAIA football season =

American college football season

- Regular season: August–November 1967
- Postseason: November 25–December 9, 1967
- National Championship: Mountaineer Field Morgantown, WV
- Champion: Fairmont State

The 1967 NAIA football season was the 12th season of college football sponsored by the NAIA.

The season was played from August to November 1967, culminating in the 1967 NAIA Championship Bowl, played this year on December 9, 1967 at Mountaineer Field in Morgantown, West Virginia.

Fairmont State defeated Eastern Washington in the Championship Bowl, 28–21, to win their first NAIA national title.

== Conference realignment ==
=== Conference changes ===
- The Montana Collegiate Conference was renamed as the Frontier Conference.

== Conference standings ==
1967 Alabama Collegiate Conference football standings
	Conf.					Overall
Team	W		L		T	W		L		T
Troy State $	3	–	0	–	0	8	–	2	–	0
Jacksonville State	1	–	1	–	1	4	–	5	–	1
Florence State	1	–	2	–	0	2	–	6	–	1
Livingston	0	–	2	–	1	4	–	5	–	1
$ – Conference champion

1967 Arkansas Intercollegiate Conference football standings
	Conf.					Overall
Team	W		L		T	W		L		T
Arkansas A&M $	4	–	1	–	1	6	–	3	–	1
Arkansas Tech	3	–	2	–	1	5	–	3	–	1
Southern Arkansas	3	–	2	–	1	5	–	3	–	1
State College of Arkansas	3	–	2	–	1	5	–	3	–	1
Ouachita Baptist	3	–	3	–	0	6	–	4	–	0
Henderson State	3	–	3	–	0	5	–	4	–	0
Harding	0	–	6	–	0	3	–	7	–	0
$ – Conference champion

1967 Carolinas Conference football standings
	Conf.					Overall
Team	W		L		T	W		L		T
No. 9 Lenoir Rhyne $	6	–	1	–	0	8	–	1	–	0
Appalachian State	5	–	2	–	0	7	–	3	–	0
Elon	4	–	2	–	1	5	–	3	–	1
Presbyterian	4	–	3	–	0	5	–	4	–	1
Guilford	3	–	4	–	0	6	–	4	–	0
Catawba	2	–	4	–	1	5	–	4	–	1
Western Carolina	2	–	4	–	1	4	–	5	–	1
Newberry	0	–	6	–	1	1	–	8	–	1
$ – Conference champion; Rankings from NAIA poll

1967 Central Intercollegiate Conference football standings
	Conf.					Overall
Team	W		L		T	W		L		T
Omaha $	4	–	0	–	0	7	–	3	–	0
Pittsburg State	3	–	1	–	0	6	–	2	–	1
Fort Hays State	2	–	2	–	0	3	–	5	–	0
Emporia State	1	–	3	–	0	1	–	9	–	0
Washburn	0	–	4	–	0	0	–	9	–	0
$ – Conference champion

1967 College Conference of Illinois and Wisconsin football standings
	Conf.					Overall
Team	W		L		T	W		L		T
Carthage $	6	–	0	–	0	7	–	1	–	0
Illinois Wesleyan	5	–	1	–	0	7	–	2	–	0
Carroll (WI)	4	–	2	–	0	5	–	3	–	0
Augustana (IL)	3	–	3	–	0	4	–	5	–	0
North Park	1	–	5	–	0	3	–	6	–	0
North Central (IL)	1	–	5	–	0	2	–	7	–	0
Millikin	1	–	5	–	0	1	–	8	–	0
$ – Conference champion

1967 Eastern Football Conference football standings
	Conf.					Overall
Team	W		L		T	W		L		T
Central Connecticut State +	4	–	1	–	0	7	–	1	–	0
Southern Connecticut State +	4	–	1	–	0	6	–	3	–	0
Bridgeport	2	–	2	–	0	2	–	6	–	0
Montclair State	2	–	3	–	0	4	–	5	–	0
Glassboro State	1	–	3	–	0	3	–	5	–	0
Trenton State	1	–	4	–	0	2	–	6	–	0
+ – Conference co-champions

1967 Evergreen Conference football standings
	Conf.					Overall
Team	W		L		T	W		L		T
No. 2 Eastern Washington $^	6	–	0	–	0	11	–	1	–	0
Central Washington	3	–	3	–	0	4	–	6	–	0
Western Washington	2	–	4	–	0	3	–	6	–	0
Whitworth	1	–	5	–	0	2	–	7	–	0
$ – Conference champion; ^ – NAIA playoff participant; Rankings from NAIA poll

1967 Frontier Conference football standings
	Conf.					Overall
Team	W		L		T	W		L		T
Western Montana $	5	–	0	–	0	6	–	1	–	0
Eastern Montana	4	–	1	–	0	5	–	2	–	1
Northern Montana	3	–	2	–	0	3	–	3	–	1
Carroll (MT)	2	–	3	–	0	2	–	5	–	0
Rocky Mountain	1	–	4	–	0	2	–	5	–	1
Montana Tech	0	–	5	–	0	0	–	6	–	0
$ – Conference champion

1967 Gateway Conference football standings
	Conf.					Overall
Team	W		L		T	W		L		T
Lakeland $	4	–	0	–	0	8	–	1	–	0
St. Procopius	3	–	1	–	0	4	–	4	–	0
Milton	2	–	2	–	0	2	–	6	–	0
Northwestern (WI)	1	–	3	–	0	1	–	7	–	0
Eureka	0	–	4	–	0	1	–	7	–	0
$ – Conference champion

1967 Iowa Conference football standings
	Conf.					Overall
Team	W		L		T	W		L		T
No. 11 Central (IA) $	7	–	0	–	0	9	–	0	–	0
Simpson (IA)	6	–	1	–	0	7	–	1	–	1
Luther	4	–	2	–	1	4	–	4	–	1
William Penn	3	–	4	–	0	4	–	5	–	0
Upper Iowa	2	–	4	–	1	3	–	5	–	1
Buena Vista	2	–	5	–	0	2	–	6	–	0
Dubuque	1	–	4	–	2	1	–	6	–	2
Wartburg	1	–	6	–	0	1	–	8	–	0
$ – Conference champion; Rankings from NAIA poll

1967 Kansas Collegiate Athletic Conference football standings
	Conf.					Overall
Team	W		L		T	W		L		T
No. 15 Southwestern (KS) $	9	–	0	–	0	9	–	0	–	1
Ottawa	8	–	1	–	0	8	–	1	–	0
Baker	6	–	3	–	0	6	–	3	–	0
Kansas Wesleyan	6	–	3	–	0	6	–	3	–	0
College of Emporia	5	–	4	–	0	5	–	4	–	0
Friends	4	–	4	–	1	4	–	4	–	1
Sterling	3	–	5	–	1	3	–	5	–	1
Bethany (KS)	2	–	7	–	0	2	–	7	–	0
Bethel (KS)	1	–	8	–	0	1	–	8	–	0
McPherson	0	–	9	–	0	0	–	9	–	0
$ – Conference champion; Rankings from NAIA poll

1967 Lone Star Conference football standings
	Conf.					Overall
Team	W		L		T	W		L		T
No. 4 Texas A&I $	7	–	0	–	0	9	–	0	–	0
No. 8 Southwest Texas State	6	–	1	–	0	9	–	1	–	0
Howard Payne	4	–	3	–	0	7	–	3	–	0
McMurry	4	–	3	–	0	6	–	4	–	0
East Texas State	3	–	4	–	0	4	–	6	–	0
Stephen F. Austin	3	–	4	–	0	4	–	6	–	0
Sam Houston State	1	–	6	–	0	3	–	6	–	0
Sul Ross	0	–	7	–	0	3	–	7	–	0
$ – Conference champion; Rankings from NAIA poll

1967 Michigan Intercollegiate Athletic Association football standings
	Conf.					Overall
Team	W		L		T	W		L		T
No. 20 Alma $	5	–	0	–	0	8	–	0	–	0
Olivet	4	–	1	–	0	8	–	1	–	0
Albion	2	–	2	–	0	2	–	5	–	1
Hope	1	–	3	–	0	2	–	6	–	0
Kalamazoo	1	–	4	–	0	2	–	6	–	0
Adrian	1	–	4	–	0	1	–	7	–	0
$ – Conference champion; Rankings from NAIA poll

1967 Mid-Ohio Conference football standings
	Conf.					Overall
Team	W		L		T	W		L		T
Bluffton $	2	–	0	–	0	5	–	3	–	1
Defiance	1	–	1	–	0	7	–	2	–	0
Wilmington (OH)	0	–	2	–	0	2	–	6	–	0
$ – Conference champion

1967 Midwest Conference football standings
	Conf.					Overall
Team	W		L		T	W		L		T
Lawrence $	8	–	0	–	0	8	–	0	–	0
St. Olaf	6	–	2	–	0	6	–	2	–	0
Monmouth (IL)	5	–	3	–	0	5	–	3	–	0
Beloit	4	–	4	–	0	4	–	4	–	0
Coe	4	–	4	–	0	4	–	4	–	0
Cornell (IA)	4	–	4	–	0	4	–	4	–	0
Ripon	4	–	4	–	0	4	–	4	–	0
Carleton	2	–	5	–	1	2	–	5	–	1
Grinnell	2	–	6	–	0	2	–	6	–	0
Knox	0	–	7	–	1	0	–	7	–	1
$ – Conference champion

1967 Minnesota Intercollegiate Athletic Conference football standings
	Conf.					Overall
Team	W		L		T	W		L		T
Gustavus Adolphus $	6	–	1	–	0	6	–	3	–	0
Concordia (MN)	5	–	1	–	1	7	–	1	–	1
Minnesota–Duluth	5	–	1	–	1	7	–	1	–	1
St. Thomas (MN)	4	–	3	–	0	6	–	3	–	0
Saint John's (MN)	3	–	4	–	0	3	–	5	–	0
Hamline	2	–	5	–	0	4	–	5	–	0
Macalester	2	–	5	–	0	3	–	6	–	0
Augsburg	0	–	7	–	0	1	–	8	–	0
$ – Conference champion

1967 Missouri College Athletic Union football standings
	Conf.					Overall
Team	W		L		T	W		L		T
Tarkio +	3	–	0	–	0	6	–	2	–	1
No. 16 William Jewell +	2	–	0	–	0	10	–	0	–	1
Missouri Valley	1	–	1	–	0	6	–	4	–	0
Central Methodist	1	–	1	–	1	6	–	1	–	1
Culver–Stockton	1	–	2	–	0	5	–	4	–	0
Graceland	0	–	4	–	1	1	–	6	–	2
+ – Conference co-champions; Rankings from NAIA poll

1967 Nebraska College Conference football standings
	Conf.					Overall
Team	W		L		T	W		L		T
No. 6 Kearney State $	4	–	0	–	0	9	–	0	–	0
Wayne State (NE)	3	–	1	–	0	6	–	4	–	0
Chadron State	2	–	2	–	0	3	–	6	–	0
Peru State	1	–	3	–	0	1	–	7	–	1
Hastings	0	–	4	–	0	2	–	8	–	0
$ – Conference champion; Rankings from NAIA poll

1967 North Dakota College Athletic Conference football standings
	Conf.					Overall
Team	W		L		T	W		L		T
No. 19 Jamestown $	6	–	0	–	0	8	–	0	–	0
Minot State	5	–	1	–	0	6	–	2	–	0
Mayville State	3	–	2	–	1	4	–	3	–	1
Valley City State	3	–	3	–	0	4	–	4	–	0
Ellendale	1	–	4	–	1	1	–	4	–	1
Dickinson State	1	–	5	–	0	2	–	6	–	0
Wahpeton Science	0	–	4	–	2	0	–	5	–	2
$ – Conference champion; Rankings from NAIA poll

1967 Northern Intercollegiate Conference football standings
	Conf.					Overall
Team	W		L		T	W		L		T
St. Cloud State $	5	–	0	–	0	8	–	1	–	0
Winona State	4	–	1	–	0	6	–	3	–	0
Mankato State	3	–	2	–	0	5	–	4	–	0
Bemidji State	1	–	3	–	1	3	–	5	–	1
Moorhead State	1	–	3	–	1	2	–	5	–	1
Michigan Tech	0	–	5	–	0	0	–	7	–	1
$ – Conference champion

1967 Northwest Conference football standings
	Conf.					Overall
Team	W		L		T	W		L		T
Linfield +	5	–	1	–	0	8	–	1	–	0
Willamette +	5	–	1	–	0	7	–	2	–	0
Lewis & Clark +	5	–	1	–	0	7	–	2	–	0
Pacific (OR)	2	–	4	–	0	3	–	6	–	0
Pacific Lutheran	2	–	4	–	0	2	–	7	–	0
Whitman	1	–	5	–	0	2	–	6	–	0
College of Idaho	1	–	5	–	0	2	–	7	–	0
+ – Conference co-champions

1967 Oklahoma Collegiate Conference football standings
	Conf.					Overall
Team	W		L		T	W		L		T
East Central +	6	–	1	–	0	8	–	2	–	0
SE Oklahoma State +	6	–	1	–	0	6	–	3	–	0
Langston	5	–	1	–	1	7	–	1	–	1
Panhandle	4	–	3	–	0	6	–	5	–	0
NW Oklahoma State	3	–	4	–	0	4	–	6	–	0
Central State (OK)	2	–	4	–	1	4	–	5	–	1
Northeastern State	1	–	6	–	0	1	–	7	–	1
SW Oklahoma State	0	–	7	–	0	3	–	7	–	0
+ – Conference co-champions; SW Oklahoma State forfefeited win over Langston, Panhandle A&M, NW Oklahoma State, Central State (OK), and Northeastern State due to an ineligible player.

1967 Oregon Collegiate Conference football standings
	Conf.					Overall
Team	W		L		T	W		L		T
Southern Oregon +	3	–	1	–	0	5	–	4	–	0
Oregon College +	3	–	1	–	0	4	–	4	–	0
Eastern Oregon	2	–	2	–	0	2	–	6	–	0
Oregon Tech	1	–	3	–	0	3	–	6	–	0
George Fox	1	–	3	–	0	1	–	6	–	0
+ – Conference co-champions

1967 Rocky Mountain Conference football standings
	Conf.					Overall
Team	W		L		T	W		L		T
Adams State $	3	–	0	–	0	8	–	1	–	0
Colorado State–Greeley	2	–	1	–	0	6	–	2	–	1
Western State (CO)	1	–	2	–	0	4	–	5	–	0
Colorado Mines	0	–	3	–	0	1	–	7	–	1
$ – Conference champion

1967 South Dakota Intercollegiate Conference football standings
	Conf.					Overall
Team	W		L		T	W		L		T
Northern State $	6	–	0	–	0	8	–	1	–	0
Huron	4	–	1	–	1	5	–	3	–	1
Dakota Wesleyan	4	–	2	–	0	4	–	5	–	0
Southern State (SD)	2	–	4	–	0	3	–	6	–	0
General Beadle	2	–	4	–	0	4	–	5	–	0
South Dakota Tech	1	–	4	–	1	3	–	4	–	1
Black Hills State	1	–	5	–	0	2	–	6	–	0
$ – Conference champion

1967 Southern California Intercollegiate Athletic Conference football standings
	Conf.					Overall
Team	W		L		T	W		L		T
Whittier $	4	–	1	–	0	4	–	5	–	0
Occidental	3	–	2	–	0	5	–	4	–	0
Redlands	3	–	2	–	0	5	–	5	–	0
Pomona	3	–	2	–	0	3	–	6	–	0
Claremont-Mudd	2	–	3	–	0	2	–	7	–	0
Caltech	0	–	5	–	0	0	–	8	–	0
$ – Conference champion; Caltech forfeited to Whittier and Redlands; the forfeits were included only in conference records.

1967 Southwestern Athletic Conference football standings
	Conf.					Overall
Team	W		L		T	W		L		T
No. 10 Grambling $	6	–	1	–	0	9	–	1	–	0
Texas Southern	5	–	2	–	0	7	–	3	–	0
Jackson State	4	–	3	–	0	6	–	3	–	0
Southern	4	–	3	–	0	5	–	5	–	0
Arkansas AM&N	3	–	4	–	0	6	–	4	–	0
Alcorn A&M	3	–	4	–	0	5	–	4	–	0
Prairie View A&M	2	–	5	–	0	5	–	5	–	0
Wiley	1	–	6	–	0	3	–	7	–	0
$ – Conference champion; Rankings from NAIA poll

1967 Tri-State Conference football standings
	Conf.					Overall
Team	W		L		T	W		L		T
Westmar $	6	–	0	–	0	8	–	1	–	0
Yankton	5	–	1	–	0	8	–	1	–	0
Sioux Falls	4	–	2	–	0	7	–	2	–	0
Dana	2	–	3	–	1	2	–	4	–	2
Midland	1	–	3	–	2	2	–	6	–	0
Concordia (NE)	1	–	5	–	0	2	–	7	–	0
Northwestern (IA)	0	–	5	–	1	0	–	7	–	1
$ – Conference champion

1967 West Penn Conference football standings
	Conf.					Overall
Team	W		L		T	W		L		T
No. 7 Waynesburg $	2	–	0	–	0	8	–	1	–	0
Westminster (PA)	2	–	1	–	0	6	–	2	–	0
Grove City	1	–	1	–	0	6	–	3	–	0
Geneva	0	–	3	–	0	1	–	7	–	0
$ – Conference champion; Rankings from NAIA poll

1967 West Virginia Intercollegiate Athletic Conference football standings
	Conf.					Overall
Team	W		L		T	W		L		T
No. 1 Fairmont State $^	7	–	0	–	0	11	–	0	–	0
No. 14 Concord	5	–	1	–	0	7	–	2	–	0
Glenville State	5	–	1	–	1	5	–	2	–	1
Salem	4	–	3	–	1	5	–	3	–	1
West Liberty State	4	–	4	–	0	4	–	5	–	0
West Virginia Wesleyan	2	–	3	–	0	3	–	5	–	0
Bluefield State	1	–	6	–	1	2	–	6	–	1
West Virginia State	1	–	5	–	0	2	–	6	–	0
West Virginia Tech	0	–	6	–	1	1	–	7	–	1
Shepherd *	1	–	1	–	0	3	–	5	–	0
$ – Conference champion; ^ – NAIA playoff participant * – Did not qualify for conference standings Conference standings based on power ratings; Rankings from NAIA poll

1967 Wisconsin State University Conference football standings
	Conf.					Overall
Team	W		L		T	W		L		T
No. 18 Whitewater State $	7	–	1	–	0	8	–	1	–	0
Stevens Point State	6	–	1	–	1	6	–	2	–	1
Oshkosh State	6	–	2	–	0	6	–	3	–	0
La Crosse State	4	–	3	–	1	4	–	4	–	1
Platteville State	4	–	4	–	0	5	–	4	–	0
Superior State	3	–	5	–	0	3	–	6	–	0
Eau Claire State	2	–	6	–	0	3	–	6	–	0
River Falls State	2	–	6	–	0	2	–	7	–	0
Stout State	1	–	6	–	0	1	–	7	–	0
$ – Conference champion; Rankings from NAIA poll

1967 NAIA independents football records
	Conf.			Overall
Team	W	L	T	W		L		T
No. 12 Ashland		–		8	–	0	–	1
No. 17 Doane		–		8	–	0	–	1
No. 5 New Mexico Highlands ^		–		9	–	1	–	0
No. 3 Northern Michigan ^		–		9	–	1	–	0
Cal Lutheran		–		7	–	2	–	0
Wheaton (IL)		–		7	–	2	–	0
Simon Fraser		–		6	–	2	–	0
Emory and Henry		–		7	–	3	–	0
Austin		–		6	–	3	–	0
Iowa Wesleyan		–		6	–	3	–	0
La Verne		–		6	–	3	–	0
Kentucky State		–		5	–	3	–	1
Carson–Newman		–		6	–	4	–	0
Findlay		–		4	–	3	–	1
Oklahoma Panhandle State		–		6	–	5	–	0
Wofford		–		4	–	6	–	0
Azusa Pacific		–		3	–	5	–	1
Hillsdale		–		3	–	5	–	0
Southern Colorado State		–		3	–	6	–	1
Eastern New Mexico		–		3	–	6	–	0
St. Mary of the Plains		–		2	–	5	–	2
Georgetown (KY)		–		2	–	7	–	0
Westminster (UT)		–		1	–	7	–	0
Rankings from NAIA poll

== Postseason ==
Semifinals; November 25, 1967
Eastern Washington	28
New Mexico Highlands*	14
Northern Michigan	7
Fairmont State*	21

NAIA Champions Bowl; December 9, 1967; Morgantown, WV
Eastern Washington	21
Fairmont State	28

=== Champion Bowl: Eastern Washington ===
Champion Bowl: E. Washington vs Fairmont State

	1	2	3	4	Total
Eastern Washington	0	14	0	7	21
• Fairmont State	0	7	14	7	28

- Date: December 9
- Location: Morgantown, WV
- Game attendance: 12,250 (est)

Scoring summary
2		E. WASH.	Dave Svendsen 3-yard pass from Bill Diedrick (Pat Zlateff kick)	E. WASH. 7–0
2		E. WASH.	Zlateff 34-yard pass from Diedrick (Zlateff kick)	E. WASH. 14–0
2		FAIRMONT	Larry Blackstone 1-yard run (John Huff kick)	E. WASH 14–7
3		FAIRMONT	Jim Mertens 18-yard pass from Roy Michael (Huff kick)	TIE 14–14
3		FAIRMONT	Blackstone 1-yard run (Huff kick)	FAIRMONT 21–14
4		E. WASH.	Rick Hardie 31-yard pass from Roy Stookey (Zlateff kick)	TIE 21–21
4		FAIRMONT	George Edwards 27-yard run (Huff kick)	FAIRMONT 28–21

== See also ==
- 1967 NCAA University Division football season
- 1967 NCAA College Division football season
