= 1967 East Tennessee State Buccaneers football team =

American college football season

1967 East Tennessee State Buccaneers football
- Conference: Ohio Valley Conference
- Record: 3–6–1 (3–4 OVC)
- Head coach: John Robert Bell (2nd season)
- Home stadium: University Stadium

1967 Ohio Valley Conference football standings
	Conf.					Overall
Team	W		L		T	W		L		T
No. 5/11 Eastern Kentucky $	5	–	0	–	2	7	–	1	–	2
Western Kentucky	5	–	1	–	1	7	–	1	–	1
Middle Tennessee	4	–	3	–	0	5	–	5	–	0
East Tennessee State	3	–	4	–	0	3	–	6	–	1
Tennessee Tech	3	–	4	–	0	3	–	7	–	0
Morehead State	2	–	4	–	1	4	–	5	–	1
Murray State	2	–	5	–	0	4	–	6	–	0
Austin Peay	2	–	5	–	0	2	–	8	–	0
$ – Conference champion; Rankings from AP/UPI small college polls

The 1967 East Tennessee State Buccaneers football team represented East Tennessee State University as a member of the Ohio Valley Conference (OVC) during the 1967 NCAA College Division football season. Led by second-year head coach John Robert Bell, the Buccaneers compiled an overall record of 3–6–1, with a mark of 3–4 in conference play, and finished tied for fourth in the OVC.

== Schedule ==
Date	Opponent	Site	Result	Attendance	Source
September 16	vs. Parsons*	J. Fred Johnson Stadium; Kingsport, TN	T 0–0	7,000	
September 23	Eastern Kentucky	University Stadium; Johnson City, TN	L 7–35	7,000	
September 30	at Western Kentucky	Bowling Green, KY	L 3–6	12,000	
October 7	at Tennessee Tech	Tucker Stadium; Cookeville, TN	L 22–43	8,000	
October 14	Chattanooga*	University Stadium; Johnson City, TN	L 14–15	4,000	
October 21	Murray State	University Stadium; Johnson City, TN	W 8–7	8,000	
October 28	at Quantico Marines*	Butler Stadium; Quantico, VA	L 0–3	7,000	
November 4	at Morehead State	Jayne Stadium; Morehead, KY	W 16–0	3,000	
November 11	Middle Tennessee	University Stadium; Johnson City, TN	L 26–36	3,000	
November 18	at Austin Peay	Municipal Stadium; Clarksville, TN	W 37–0	3,000	
*Non-conference game; Source:
