= 1967 college football season =

1967 college football season may refer to:

- 1967 NCAA University Division football season
- 1967 NCAA College Division football season
- 1967 NAIA football season
