= 1967 East Texas State Lions football team =

American college football season

1967 East Texas State Lions football
- Conference: Lone Star Conference
- Record: 4–6 (3–4 LSC)
- Head coach: Ernest Hawkins (4th season)
- Home stadium: Memorial Stadium

1967 Lone Star Conference football standings
	Conf.					Overall
Team	W		L		T	W		L		T
No. 4 Texas A&I $	7	–	0	–	0	9	–	0	–	0
No. 8 Southwest Texas State	6	–	1	–	0	9	–	1	–	0
Howard Payne	4	–	3	–	0	7	–	3	–	0
McMurry	4	–	3	–	0	6	–	4	–	0
East Texas State	3	–	4	–	0	4	–	6	–	0
Stephen F. Austin	3	–	4	–	0	4	–	6	–	0
Sam Houston State	1	–	6	–	0	3	–	6	–	0
Sul Ross	0	–	7	–	0	3	–	7	–	0
$ – Conference champion; Rankings from NAIA poll

The 1967 East Texas State Lions football team represented East Texas State University in the 1967 NAIA football season. They were led by head coach Ernest Hawkins, who was in his fourth season at East Texas State. The Lions played their home games at Memorial Stadium and were members of the Lone Star Conference. The Lions finished the season with a 4–6 record.

== Schedule ==
Date	Opponent	Site	Result	Attendance	Source
September 16	Abilene Christian*	Memorial Stadium; Commerce, TX	L 16–24	7,500	
September 23	at Southwest Missouri State*	SMS Stadium; Springfield, MO	W 37–15		
September 30	No. 6 UT Arlington*	Memorial Stadium; Commerce, TX	L 6–7	10,000	
October 7	at McMurry	Shotwell Stadium; Abilene, TX	L 9–13		
October 14	at Texas A&I	Javelina Stadium; Kingsville, TX	L 6–24		
October 21	Sul Ross	Memorial Stadium; Commerce, TX	W 31–0		
October 27	at Howard Payne	Lion Stadium; Brownwood, TX	L 14–28		
November 4	Sam Houston State	Memorial Stadium; Commerce, TX	W 31–8		
November 11	at No. 10 Southwest Texas State	Evans Field; San Marcos, TX	L 26–48		
November 18	Stephen F. Austin	Memorial Stadium; Commerce, TX	W 12–10		
*Non-conference game; Rankings from AP Poll released prior to the game

== Postseason awards ==
=== All-Americans ===
- Sam Walton, Second Team offensive line
- Tom Black, Honorable Mention tight end
- Arthur James, Honorable Mention tailback
- Mike Venable, Honorable Mention linebacker

=== All-Lone Star Conference ===
==== LSC First Team ====
- Tom Black, tight end
- Arthur James, tailback
- Sam Walton, offensive tackle

==== LSC Second Team ====
- Chad Brown, offensive tackle
- Tommy Briscoe, offensive guard
- Mike Venable, linebacker

==== LSC Honorable Mention ====
- Charles Froneberger, center
