= Arnold Jeter =

American football player and coach (1939–2022)

Arnold F. Jeter
Biographical details
- Born: February 28, 1939
- Died: January 1, 2022 (aged 82); Toms River, New Jersey, U.S.

Playing career
- 1960: Kent State
- Position: Halfback

Coaching career (HC unless noted)
- 1966: Iowa (freshmen backfield)
- 1967–1974: Delaware State
- 1975–1976: Marshall (assistant)
- 1977–1986: Wisconsin (DL)
- 1987–1989: Arizona (DL)
- 1990–1992: Rutgers (associate HC)
- 1995–2000: New Jersey City (assistant)
- 2001–2002: New Jersey City

Head coaching record
- Overall: 28–63–1

Arnold F. Jeter (February 28, 1939 – January 1, 2022) was an American football player and coach. He served as the head football coach at Delaware State University from 1967 to 1974 and New Jersey City University (NJCU) from 2001 to 2002, compiling a career college football coaching record of 28–63–1. A native of Steubenville, Ohio, Jeter played college football at Kent State University as a halfback and was second on the team in scoring as a senior.

== Coaching career ==
Jeter began coaching football at the junior high and high school levels in Warren, Ohio. From the spring of 1966 to the spring of 1967, he was a backfield coach for the freshman football team at the University of Iowa, where he earned a master's degree in physical education.

Jeter landed his first head coaching job at Delaware State University, a position he held from 1967 to 1974, compiling an overall record of 25–48–1. In 1973 the Hornets went winless, finishing 0–11. From 1975 through 1992, Jeter hopped around as an assistant or associate head coach at Marshall, Wisconsin, Arizona and Rutgers. In 1995, he became an assistant coach at New Jersey City University (NJCU), a position he held for six seasons until being named the program's ninth head coach in January 2001. Jeter was the head coach of the Gothic Knights for only two years until NJCU dropped its football program after the 2002 season due to budget cuts. He remained at NJCU as an assistant athletic director.

== Personal life and death ==
Jeter died on January 1, 2022, at the age of 82.

== Head coaching record ==
Year	Team	Overall	Conference	Standing	Bowl/playoffs
Delaware State Hornets (Central Intercollegiate Athletic Association) (1967–1970)
1967	Delaware State	2–6–1	2–3–1	9th	
1968	Delaware State	4–6	2–4	13th	
1969	Delaware State	4–5	3–3	9th	
1970	Delaware State	6–2	4–1	3rd (Northern)	
Delaware State Hornets (Mid-Eastern Athletic Conference) (1971–1974)
1971	Delaware State	1–8	1–5	T–6th	
1972	Delaware State	5–4	2–4	T–5th	
1973	Delaware State	0–11	0–6	7th	
1974	Delaware State	3–6	0–6	7th	
Delaware State:		25–48–1	13–32–1		
New Jersey City Gothic Knights (New Jersey Athletic Conference) (2001–2002)
2001	New Jersey City	2–7	1–5	T–6th	
2002	New Jersey City	1–8	1–5	6th	
New Jersey City:		3–15	2–10		
Total:		28–63–1			
