= Les Wheeler =

American football player and coach (1931–1989)

Biographical details
- Born: 1931
- Died: August 12, 1989 (aged 57–58); Alice, Texas, U.S.

Playing career
- 1949–1951: Abilene Christian
- Position: Tackle

Coaching career (HC unless noted)
- 1955: Lamesa HS (TX) (assistant)
- 1956–1961: Abilene Christian (line)
- 1962–1967: Abilene Christian

Head coaching record
- Overall: 30–27

Lester Wheeler (1931 – August 12, 1989) was an American football player and coach. A tackle from Abilene Christian College—now known as Abilene Christian University—he was selected 245th overall by the Philadelphia Eagles in the 21st round of the 1952 NFL draft. After coaching at Lamesa High School in Lamesa, Texas, Wheeler returned to his alma mater in 1956 as line coach. He was the ninth head football coach at Abilene Christian, serving for six seasons, from 1962 to 1967, and compiling a record of 30–27.

== Head coaching record ==
Year	Team	Overall	Conference	Standing	Bowl/playoffs
Abilene Christian Wildcats (NCAA College Division independent) (1962–1963)
1962	Abilene Christian	6–4			
1963	Abilene Christian	8–1			
Abilene Christian Wildcats (Southland Conference) (1964–1967)
1964	Abilene Christian	5–5	1–3	4th	
1965	Abilene Christian	4–5	2–2	T–2nd	
1966	Abilene Christian	4–6	0–4	5th	
1967	Abilene Christian	3–6	0–4	5th	
Abilene Christian:		30–27	3–13		
Total:		30–27			
