= 1967 Abilene Christian Wildcats football team =

American college football season

1967 Abilene Christian Wildcats football
- Conference: Southland Conference
- Record: 3–6 (0–4 Southland)
- Head coach: Les Wheeler (6th season)
- Home stadium: Shotwell Stadium

1967 Southland Conference football standings
	Conf.					Overall
Team	W		L		T	W		L		T
No. 6 UT Arlington $	4	–	0	–	0	10	–	1	–	0
Lamar Tech	3	–	1	–	0	7	–	3	–	0
Arkansas State	2	–	2	–	0	4	–	5	–	0
Trinity (TX)	1	–	3	–	0	3	–	7	–	0
Abilene Christian	0	–	4	–	0	3	–	6	–	0
$ – Conference champion; Rankings from AP small college poll

The 1967 Abilene Christian Wildcats football team was an American football team that represented Abilene Christian College (now known as Abilene Christian University) in the Southland Conference during the 1967 NCAA College Division football season. In their sixth year under head coach Les Wheeler, the team compiled a 3–6 record.

== Schedule ==
Date	Opponent	Site	Result	Attendance	Source
September 16	at East Texas State*	Memorial Stadium; Commerce, TX	W 24–16	7,500	
September 23	at Howard Payne*	Lion Stadium; Brownwood, TX	L 19–23	4,900	
September 30	vs. McMurry*	Shotwell Stadium; Abilene, TX	W 13–10	11,000–11,500	
October 14	Lamar Tech	Shotwell Stadium; Abilene, TX	L 13–54	3,000–4,000	
October 21	at Arkansas State	Kays Stadium; Jonesboro, AR	L 14–24	8,527	
October 28	Eastern New Mexico*	Shotwell Stadium; Abilene, TX	W 27–3	2,500	
November 4	at No. 5 UT Arlington	Memorial Stadium; Arlington, TX	L 7–34	10,050–10,500	
November 11	Trinity (TX)	Shotwell Stadium; Abilene, TX	L 7–20	10,000	
November 18	at Angelo State*	San Angelo Stadium; San Angelo, TX	L 6–17	2,500	
*Non-conference game; Rankings from AP Poll released prior to the game
