= 1967 Western Kentucky Hilltoppers football team =

American college football season

1967 Western Kentucky Hilltoppers football
- Conference: Ohio Valley Conference
- Record: 7–1–1 (5–1–1 OVC)
- Head coach: Nick Denes (11th season)
- Captains: Wes Simpson; Bill Taylor

1967 Ohio Valley Conference football standings
	Conf.					Overall
Team	W		L		T	W		L		T
No. 5/11 Eastern Kentucky $	5	–	0	–	2	7	–	1	–	2
Western Kentucky	5	–	1	–	1	7	–	1	–	1
Middle Tennessee	4	–	3	–	0	5	–	5	–	0
East Tennessee State	3	–	4	–	0	3	–	6	–	1
Tennessee Tech	3	–	4	–	0	3	–	7	–	0
Morehead State	2	–	4	–	1	4	–	5	–	1
Murray State	2	–	5	–	0	4	–	6	–	0
Austin Peay	2	–	5	–	0	2	–	8	–	0
$ – Conference champion; Rankings from AP/UPI small college polls

The 1967 Western Kentucky Hilltoppers football team represented Western Kentucky University as a member of the Ohio Valley Conference (OVC) during the 1967 NCAA College Division football season. Led by Nick Denes in his 11th and final season as head coach, the Hilltoppers compiled an overall record of 7–1–1 with a mark of 5–1–1 in conference play, placing second in the OVC.

Assistant coach Jimmy Feix succeeded Denes as head coach after the season. Also on the coaching staff were future National Football League (NFL) head coaches Jerry Glanville and Joe Bugel. The team roster included future NFL players Roy Bondurant, Lawrence Brame, and Bill "Jelly" Green, as well as future NFL coach Romeo Crennel. Dickie Moore was named to the AP All-American team and was Ohio Valley Conference Player of the Year. The All-OVC team included Bondurant, Jim Garrett, Walt Heath, Allan Hogan, Moore, Larry Watkins, Brame, Bill Hape, Johnny Jaggers, and Fred Snyder.

== Schedule ==
Date	Opponent	Site	Result	Attendance	Source
September 16	at Saint Joseph's (IN)*	Alumni Stadium; Rensselaer, IN	W 47–7	3,500–4,500	
September 23	at Austin Peay	Municipal Stadium; Clarksville, TN	W 31–6	4,500–6,500	
September 30	East Tennessee State	Bowling Green, KY	W 6–3	7,500–8,003	
October 14	Tennessee Tech	Bowling Green, KY	W 56–0	8,000–8,506	
October 21	at No. 4 Eastern Kentucky	Hanger Field; Richmond, KY (Battle of the Bluegrass)	T 14–14	15,000	
October 28	Morehead State^{†}	Bowling Green, KY	W 30–19	13,000–13,059	
November 4	at Middle Tennessee	Johnny "Red" Floyd Stadium; Murfreesboro, TN (100 Miles of Hate)	L 14–16	7,000–8,353	
November 11	at Butler*	Butler Bowl; Indianapolis, IN	W 36–14	2,000	
November 18	Murray State	Bowling Green, KY (rivalry)	W 42–19	7,500	
*Non-conference game; ^{†}Homecoming; Rankings from AP Poll released prior to the game
