= Ron Roberts (coach) =

American football, wrestling, and tennis coach (1931–2023)

Bernard Heselton
Biographical details
- Born: February 5, 1931; Chicago, Illinois, U.S.
- Died: December 2, 2012 (aged 81); Oshkosh, Wisconsin, U.S.

Playing career

Football
- 1950: Wisconsin
- 1952–1953: Wisconsin

Wrestling
- c. 1953: Wisconsin
- Positions: Center, Guard (football)

Coaching career (HC unless noted)

Football
- 1957–1959: Crane HS (IL)
- 1960–1962: East Leyden HS (IL)
- 1963–1964: Lawrence (line)
- 1965–1983: Lawrence
- 1989: Lawrence (OC)
- 1992: Lawrence

Wrestling
- 1960–1962: East Leyden HS (IL) (assistant)
- 1963–1969: Lawrence
- 1972–1974: Lawrence
- 1985–1993: Lawrence

Men's tennis
- 1964–1969: Lawrence

Administrative career (AD unless noted)
- 1970–1984: Lawrence
- 1992: Lawrence

Head coaching record
- Overall: 121–54–1 (college football)
- Tournaments: Football; 1–1 (NCAA D-III playoffs)

Accomplishments and honors

Championships
- Football; 6 MWC (1966–1967, 1975, 1979–1981); 1 MWC Red Division (1979) Men's tennis 1 MWC (1968)

Ronald D. Roberts (February 5, 1931 – December 2, 2012) was an American football, wrestling, and tennis coach and college athletics administrator. He was the head football coach at Lawrence University in Appleton, Wisconsin, from 1965 to 1983 and in 1992, compiling a record of 121–54–1. His 121 wins are the most of any head coach in the history of the Lawrence Vikings football program. Roberts also had three stints as Lawrence's wrestling coach, from 1963 to 1969, 1972 to 1974, and 1985 to 1993, and coached the school's men's tennis team from 1964 to 1969.

Born in Chicago, Roberts attended the University of Wisconsin, where he lettered in football, wrestling, and boxing. He played center and guard on the Wisconsin Badgers football team and was a member of the 1952 Badgers team that appeared in the 1953 Rose Bowl. After serving in the United States Army, Roberts began his coaching career at Crane High School in Chicago and then East Leyden High School in Franklin Park, Illinois. He was hired by Lawrence in 1963 as head wrestling coach, head tennis coach, and line coach for the football team under Bernie Heselton.

Roberts succeeded Heselton as Lawrence's head football coach in 1965 and then as the school's athletic director in 1970.

Roberts died on December 2, 2012, at Bethel Home in Oshkosh, Wisconsin.

== Head coaching record ==
=== College football ===
Year	Team	Overall	Conference	Standing	Bowl/playoffs
Lawrence Vikings (Midwest Conference) (1965–1983)
1965	Lawrence	5–3	5–3	T–3rd	
1966	Lawrence	7–1	7–1	T–1st	
1967	Lawrence	8–0	8–0	1st	
1968	Lawrence	2–6	2–6	9th	
1969	Lawrence	6–3	6–3	T–3rd	
1970	Lawrence	3–6	2–6	T–7th	
1971	Lawrence	6–3	5–3	T–3rd	
1972	Lawrence	1–6–1	1–6–1	8th	
1973	Lawrence	4–4	4–4	6th	
1974	Lawrence	7–2	5–2	T–2nd	
1975	Lawrence	8–1	7–1	1st	
1976	Lawrence	7–2	3–1	2nd (East)	
1977	Lawrence	8–1	3–1	2nd (East)	
1978	Lawrence	7–2	3–2	3rd (Red)	
1979	Lawrence	9–1	5–0	1st (Red)	
1980	Lawrence	8–1	7–1	T–1st	
1981	Lawrence	10–1	8–0	1st	L NCAA Division III Semifinal
1982	Lawrence	6–2	3–1	2nd (North)	
1983	Lawrence	7–2	3–1	2nd (North)	
Lawrence Vikings (Midwest Conference) (1992)
1992	Lawrence	2–7	1–4	T–5th (North)	
Lawrence:		121–54–1	92–68–4		
Total:		121–54–1			
National championship Conference title Conference division title or championship game berth
