= 1967 State College of Iowa Panthers football team =

American college football season

1967 State College of Iowa Panthers football
- Conference: North Central Conference
- Record: 7–3 (5–1 NCC)
- Head coach: Stan Sheriff (8th season)
- Home stadium: O. R. Latham Stadium

1967 North Central Conference football standings
	Conf.					Overall
Team	W		L		T	W		L		T
North Dakota State $	6	–	0	–	0	9	–	1	–	0
State College of Iowa	5	–	1	–	0	7	–	3	–	0
North Dakota	4	–	2	–	0	4	–	6	–	0
Augustana (SD)	2	–	4	–	0	4	–	5	–	0
Morningside	2	–	4	–	0	4	–	5	–	0
South Dakota State	2	–	4	–	0	4	–	6	–	0
South Dakota	0	–	6	–	0	2	–	8	–	0
$ – Conference champion

The 1967 State College of Iowa Panthers football team represented the State College of Iowa (later renamed University of Northern Iowa) as a member of the North Central Conference (NCC) during the 1967 NCAA College Division football season. In its eighth season under head coach Stan Sheriff, the team compiled a 7–3 record (5–1 in conference games) and finished in second place in the NCC.

The team's statistical leaders included junior quarterback Phil Schooley (1,193 passing yards); senior fullback Ralph Thomsen (776 rushing yards, 48 points scored); and junior end Marv Johnson (403 receiving yards). Three S.C.I. players were named to the all-NCC team: linebacker Larry Clement; defensive tackle Ray Pedersen; and halfback Bill Smith. Pedersen was also selected as a first-team All-American by the Associated Press and as the team's most valuable player. Smith set a school record with eight interceptions during the 1967 season.

The team played its home games at O. R. Latham Stadium in Cedar Falls, Iowa.

== Schedule ==
Date	Opponent	Site	Result	Attendance	Source
September 9	Northern Michigan*	O. R. Latham Stadium; Cedar Falls, IA	L 3–7	7,500	
September 16	at Western Illinois*	Hanson Field; Macomb, IL	W 12–0		
September 23	at North Dakota State	Dacotah Field; Fargo, ND	L 9–10	10,050	
September 30	North Dakota	O. R. Latham Stadium; Cedar Falls, IA	W 7–0	7,000	
October 7	Augustana (SD)	O. R. Latham Stadium; Cedar Falls, IA	W 23–10		
October 14	at Drake	Drake Stadium; Des Moines, IA	L 7–10	11,000	
October 21	at Morningside	Roberts Stadium; Sioux City, IA	W 29–19		
October 28	at South Dakota State	Brookings, SD	W 17–16		
November 4	South Dakota	O. R. Latham Stadium; Cedar Falls, IA	W 15–7	5,000	
November 11	Eastern Michigan*	O. R. Latham Stadium; Cedar Falls, IA	W 14–6	4,000	
*Non-conference game
