= Earl Banks =

American football player and coach (1924–1993)

Biographical details
- Born: June 11, 1924; Philadelphia, Pennsylvania, U.S.
- Died: October 27, 1993 (aged 69); Baltimore, Maryland, U.S.

Playing career

Football
- 1946–1949: Iowa
- 1950: New York Yanks
- Position: Guard

Coaching career (HC unless noted)

Football
- 1951–1959: Maryland State (assistant)
- 1960–1973: Morgan State

Baseball
- 1957–1959: Maryland State

Administrative career (AD unless noted)
- 1970–1983: Morgan State

Head coaching record
- Overall: 96–31–2 (football)
- Bowls: 2–2

Accomplishments and honors

Championships
- Football; 1 black college national (1967); 5 CIAA (1962, 1965–1968); 1 MEAC (1971)

Awards
- First-team All-Big Nine (1946)
- College Football Hall of Fame; Inducted in 1992 (profile)

Earl C. Banks (June 11, 1924 – October 27, 1993) was an American football player, coach, and college athletics administrator. He served as the head coach at Morgan State College—now known as Morgan State University—from 1960 to 1973, compiling a record of 96–31–2, and as the athletic director at the school from 1970 to 1983. Banks was inducted into the College Football Hall of Fame as a coach in 1992. He died on October 27, 1993, as a result of a car crash in Baltimore.

== Head coaching record ==
=== Football ===
Year	Team	Overall	Conference	Standing	Bowl/playoffs
Morgan State Bears (Central Intercollegiate Athletic Association) (1960–1970)
1960	Morgan State	3–3–1	3–3–1	8th	
1961	Morgan State	5–4	5–4	8th	
1962	Morgan State	8–1	8–1	1st	
1963	Morgan State	8–2	8–1	2nd	L Orange Blossom Classic
1964	Morgan State	7–2	7–2	2nd	
1965	Morgan State	9–0	8–0	1st	W Orange Blossom Classic
1966	Morgan State	9–0	8–0	1st	W Tangerine
1967	Morgan State	8–0	8–0	1st	
1968	Morgan State	8–1	7–1	1st	
1969	Morgan State	6–4	6–2	5th	
1970	Morgan State	8–2	5–0	1st (Northern)	L Boardwalk
Morgan State Bears (Mid-Eastern Athletic Conference) (1971–1973)
1971	Morgan State	6–4–1	5–0–1	1st	
1972	Morgan State	5–5	4–2	T–2nd	
1973	Morgan State	6–3	4–2	T–3rd	
Morgan State:		96–31–2	86–18–2		
Total:		96–31–2			
National championship Conference title Conference division title or championship game berth
