= 1967 Middle Tennessee Blue Raiders football team =

American college football season

1967 Middle Tennessee Blue Raiders football
- Conference: Ohio Valley Conference
- Record: 5–5 (4–3 OVC)
- Head coach: Charles M. Murphy (21st season)
- Captains: Matheny; Robertson
- Home stadium: Horace Jones Field

1967 Ohio Valley Conference football standings
| | Conf. | | | | | Overall |
| Team | W | | L | | T | W | | L | | T |
|---|---|---|---|---|---|---|---|---|---|---|
| No. 5/11 Eastern Kentucky $ | 5 | – | 0 | – | 2 | 7 | – | 1 | – | 2 |
| Western Kentucky | 5 | – | 1 | – | 1 | 7 | – | 1 | – | 1 |
| Middle Tennessee | 4 | – | 3 | – | 0 | 5 | – | 5 | – | 0 |
| East Tennessee State | 3 | – | 4 | – | 0 | 3 | – | 6 | – | 1 |
| Tennessee Tech | 3 | – | 4 | – | 0 | 3 | – | 7 | – | 0 |
| Morehead State | 2 | – | 4 | – | 1 | 4 | – | 5 | – | 1 |
| Murray State | 2 | – | 5 | – | 0 | 4 | – | 6 | – | 0 |
| Austin Peay | 2 | – | 5 | – | 0 | 2 | – | 8 | – | 0 |
$ – Conference champion; Rankings from AP/UPI small college polls

The 1967 Middle Tennessee Blue Raiders football team represented Middle Tennessee State University—as a member of the Ohio Valley Conference (OVC) during the 1967 NCAA College Division football season. Led by 21st-year head coach Charles M. Murphy, the Blue Raiders compiled a record an overall record of 5–5 with a mark of 4–3 in conference play, placing third in the OVC. The team's captains were Matheny and Robertson.

== Schedule ==
| Date | Opponent | Site | Result | Attendance | Source |
|---|---|---|---|---|---|
| September 16 | at Pensacola Navy* | Warrington, FL | W 28–7 | 8,000 | |
| September 23 | at Morehead State | Jayne Stadium; Morehead, KY | L 19–21 | 7,000 | |
| September 30 | Chattanooga* | Horace Jones Field; Murfreesboro, TN | L 13–30 | 8,999–10,000 | |
| October 7 | Eastern Kentucky | Horace Jones Field; Murfreesboro, TN | L 7–14 | 8,152 | |
| October 14 | Murray State | Horace Jones Field; Murfreesboro, TN | L 14–35 | 6,670 | |
| October 21 | at Austin Peay | Clarksville Municipal Stadium; Clarksville, TN | W 34–20 | 8,000 | |
| October 28 | at Tennessee–Martin* | Pacer Stadium; Martin, TN | L 36–44 | 7,500 | |
| November 4 | Western Kentucky | Horace Jones Field; Murfreesboro, TN (rivalry) | W 16–14 | 7,000–8,353 | |
| November 11 | at East Tennessee State | State College Stadium; Johnson City, TN | W 36–26 | 4,000 | |
| November 23 | Tennessee Tech | Horace Jones Field; Murfreesboro, TN | W 33–20 | 9,900 | |
*Non-conference game

== After the season ==
=== NFL draft ===
The following Blue Raider was selected in the National Football League draft following the season.

| Round | Pick | Player | Position | NFL club |
|---|---|---|---|---|
| 10 | 252 | Bob Langford | Tackle | Denver Broncos |
