= 1967 Sam Houston State Bearkats football team =

American college football season

1967 Sam Houston State Bearkats football
- Conference: Lone Star Conference
- Record: 3–6 (1–6 LSC)
- Head coach: Paul Pierce (16th season)
- Home stadium: Pritchett Field

1967 Lone Star Conference football standings
	Conf.					Overall
Team	W		L		T	W		L		T
No. 4 Texas A&I $	7	–	0	–	0	9	–	0	–	0
No. 8 Southwest Texas State	6	–	1	–	0	9	–	1	–	0
Howard Payne	4	–	3	–	0	7	–	3	–	0
McMurry	4	–	3	–	0	6	–	4	–	0
East Texas State	3	–	4	–	0	4	–	6	–	0
Stephen F. Austin	3	–	4	–	0	4	–	6	–	0
Sam Houston State	1	–	6	–	0	3	–	6	–	0
Sul Ross	0	–	7	–	0	3	–	7	–	0
$ – Conference champion; Rankings from NAIA poll

The 1967 Sam Houston State Bearkats football team represented Sam Houston State College (now known as Sam Houston State University) as a member of the Lone Star Conference (LSC) during the 1967 NAIA football season. Led by 16th-year head coach Paul Pierce, the Bearkats compiled an overall record of 3–6 with a mark of 1–6 in conference play, and finished seventh in the LSC.

== Schedule ==
Date	Opponent	Site	Result	Source
September 16	Northwestern State (OK)*	Pritchett Field; Huntsville, TX	W 38–0	
September 30	at Tarleton State*	Memorial Stadium; Stephenville, TX	W 23–6	
October 7	Howard Payne	Pritchett Field; Huntsville, TX	L 0–20	
October 14	McMurry	Pritchett Field; Huntsville, TX	L 0–7	
October 21	at Southwest Texas State	Evans Field; San Marcos, TX	L 0–61	
October 28	Stephen F. Austin	Pritchett Field; Huntsville, TX (rivalry)	L 3–29	
November 4	at East Texas State	Memorial Stadium; Commerce, TX	L 8–31	
November 11	No. 8 Texas A&I	Pritchett Field; Huntsville, TX	L 6–48	
November 18	at Sul Ross	Jackson Field; Alpine, TX	W 24–21	
*Non-conference game; Rankings from AP Poll released prior to the game
