= 1967 South Dakota Coyotes football team =

American college football season

1967 South Dakota Coyotes football
- Conference: North Central Conference
- Record: 2–8 (0–6 NCC)
- Head coach: Joe Salem (2nd season)
- Home stadium: Inman Field

1967 North Central Conference football standings
	Conf.					Overall
Team	W		L		T	W		L		T
North Dakota State $	6	–	0	–	0	9	–	1	–	0
State College of Iowa	5	–	1	–	0	7	–	3	–	0
North Dakota	4	–	2	–	0	4	–	6	–	0
Augustana (SD)	2	–	4	–	0	4	–	5	–	0
Morningside	2	–	4	–	0	4	–	5	–	0
South Dakota State	2	–	4	–	0	4	–	6	–	0
South Dakota	0	–	6	–	0	2	–	8	–	0
$ – Conference champion

The 1967 South Dakota Coyotes football team was an American football team that represented the University of South Dakota in the North Central Conference (NCC) during the 1967 NCAA College Division football season. In its second season under head coach Joe Salem, the team compiled a 2–8 record (0–6 against NCC opponents), finished in seventh place out of seven teams in the NCC, and was outscored by a total of 226 to 127. The team played its home games at Inman Field in Vermillion, South Dakota.

== Schedule ==
Date	Opponent	Site	Result	Attendance	Source
September 16	Wayne State (NE)*	Inman Field; Vermillion, SD	W 20–6	8,500	
September 23	vs. Montana*	Daylis Stadium; Billings, MT	L 3–7	6,000	
September 30	Augustana (SD)	Inman Field; Vermillion, SD	L 6–28	9,000	
October 7	North Dakota	Inman Field; Vermillion, SD (Sitting Bull Trophy)	L 6–9	4,500	
October 14	Morningside	Inman Field; Vermillion, SD	L 14–23	10,000	
October 21	South Dakota State	Inman Field; Vermillion, SD (rivalry)	L 14–42		
October 28	at No. 3 North Dakota State	Dacotah Field; Fargo, ND	L 0–34	5,500	
November 4	at State College of Iowa	O. R. Latham Stadium; Cedar Falls, IA	L 7–15		
November 11	at Drake*	Drake Stadium; Des Moines, IA	W 37–35		
November 18	at Omaha*	Al F. Caniglia Field; Omaha, NE	L 20–27		
*Non-conference game; Rankings from AP Poll released prior to the game
