= 1967 Delaware State Hornets football team =

American college football season

1967 Delaware State Hornets football
- Conference: Central Intercollegiate Athletic Association
- Record: 2–6–1 (2–3–1 CIAA)
- Head coach: Arnold Jeter (1st season)
- Home stadium: Alumni Stadium

1967 Central Intercollegiate Athletic Association football standings
| | Conf. | | | | | Overall |
| Team | W | | L | | T | W | | L | | T |
|---|---|---|---|---|---|---|---|---|---|---|
| No. 9 Morgan State $ | 8 | – | 0 | – | 0 | 8 | – | 0 | – | 0 |
| Maryland State | 5 | – | 1 | – | 0 | 5 | – | 2 | – | 0 |
| Johnson C. Smith | 5 | – | 0 | – | 1 | 6 | – | 2 | – | 1 |
| Virginia Union | 5 | – | 3 | – | 0 | 5 | – | 3 | – | 0 |
| North Carolina A&T | 3 | – | 3 | – | 1 | 3 | – | 5 | – | 1 |
| Elizabeth City State | 6 | – | 2 | – | 0 | 7 | – | 2 | – | 0 |
| Virginia State | 4 | – | 3 | – | 1 | 4 | – | 3 | – | 1 |
| Norfolk State | 3 | – | 4 | – | 0 | 4 | – | 4 | – | 0 |
| Delaware State | 2 | – | 3 | – | 1 | 2 | – | 6 | – | 1 |
| Hampton | 3 | – | 4 | – | 0 | 3 | – | 5 | – | 0 |
| Winston-Salem State | 3 | – | 4 | – | 0 | 3 | – | 5 | – | 0 |
| Howard | 2 | – | 3 | – | 0 | 2 | – | 6 | – | 0 |
| Livingstone | 2 | – | 4 | – | 0 | 2 | – | 6 | – | 0 |
| North Carolina College | 1 | – | 5 | – | 1 | 1 | – | 7 | – | 1 |
| Fayetteville State | 1 | – | 4 | – | 1 | 2 | – | 5 | – | 1 |
| Saint Paul's (VA) | 1 | – | 5 | – | 1 | 2 | – | 5 | – | 1 |
| Shaw | 1 | – | 7 | – | 1 | 1 | – | 7 | – | 1 |
$ – Conference champion; Rankings from AP small college poll

The 1967 Delaware State Hornets football team represented Delaware State College—now known as Delaware State University—as a member of the Central Intercollegiate Athletic Association (CIAA) in the 1967 NCAA College Division football season. Led by first-year head coach Arnold Jeter, the Hornets compiled an overall record of 2–6–1 and a mark of 2–3–1 in conference play, placing ninth in the CIAA.

== Schedule ==
| Date | Opponent | Site | Result | Attendance | Source |
|---|---|---|---|---|---|
| September 16 | at IUP* | Indiana, PA | L 0–16 | | |
| September 23 | Mansfield* | Alumni Stadium; Dover, DE | L 6–26 | | |
| September 30 | at Hampton | Armstrong Stadium; Hampton, VA | L 6–35 | | |
| October 7 | Howard | Alumni Stadium; Dover, DE | W 16–0 | | |
| October 14 | at Saint Paul's (VA) | Lawrenceville, VA | T 0–0 | | |
| October 21 | Morgan State | Alumni Stadium; Dover, DE | L 0–27 | 3,500 | |
| November 4 | Elizabeth City State | Alumni Stadium; Dover, DE | W 13–12 | | |
| November 11 | Maryland State | Alumni Stadium; Dover, DE | L 8–37 | 2,000 | |
| November 18 | at Montclair State* | Sprague Field; Upper Montclair, NJ | L 3–16 | | |
*Non-conference game
