= 1967 Trinity Tigers football team =

American college football season

1967 Trinity Tigers football
- Conference: Southland Conference
- Record: 3–7 (1–3 Southland)
- Head coach: Earl Gartman (1st season)
- Home stadium: E. M. Stevens Field; Alamo Stadium

1967 Southland Conference football standings
	Conf.					Overall
Team	W		L		T	W		L		T
No. 6 UT Arlington $	4	–	0	–	0	10	–	1	–	0
Lamar Tech	3	–	1	–	0	7	–	3	–	0
Arkansas State	2	–	2	–	0	4	–	5	–	0
Trinity (TX)	1	–	3	–	0	3	–	7	–	0
Abilene Christian	0	–	4	–	0	3	–	6	–	0
$ – Conference champion; Rankings from AP small college poll

The 1967 Trinity Tigers football team was an American football team that represented Trinity University in the Southland Conference during the 1967 NCAA College Division football season. In their first year under head coach Earl Gartman, the team compiled a 3–7 record.

== Schedule ==
Date	Opponent	Site	Result	Attendance	Source
September 24	UNAM*	E. M. Stevens Field; San Antonio, TX	W 20–0	4,000	
September 23	at Southwest Texas State*	Evans Field; San Marcos, TX	L 0–23	7,000–8,500	
September 30	at Texas A&I*	Javelina Stadium; Kingsville, TX	L 7–17	7,500	
October 7	at Southeastern Louisiana*	Strawberry Stadium; Hammond, LA	L 0–31	5,000	
October 14	Angelo State*	E. M. Stevens Field; San Antonio, TX	W 48–20	2,500	
October 21	No. 6 UT Arlington	Alamo Stadium; San Antonio, TX	L 16–31	1,969	
October 28	Texas Lutheran*^{†}	Alamo Stadium; San Antonio, TX	L 12–34	2,303	
November 4	at No. 6 Lamar Tech	Cardinal Stadium; Beaumont, TX	L 0–6	15,132–15,153	
November 11	at Abilene Christian	Shotwell Stadium; Abilene, TX	W 20–7	10,000	
November 18	Arkansas State	Alamo Stadium; San Antonio, TX	L 10–13	1,200–1,202	
*Non-conference game; ^{†}Homecoming; Rankings from AP Poll released prior to the game
