= 1967 Lamar Tech Cardinals football team =

American college football season

1967 Lamar Tech Cardinals football
- Conference: Southland Conference
- Record: 7–3 (3–1 Southland)
- Head coach: Vernon Glass (5th season)
- Home stadium: Cardinal Stadium

1967 Southland Conference football standings
	Conf.					Overall
Team	W		L		T	W		L		T
No. 6 UT Arlington $	4	–	0	–	0	10	–	1	–	0
Lamar Tech	3	–	1	–	0	7	–	3	–	0
Arkansas State	2	–	2	–	0	4	–	5	–	0
Trinity (TX)	1	–	3	–	0	3	–	7	–	0
Abilene Christian	0	–	4	–	0	3	–	6	–	0
$ – Conference champion; Rankings from AP small college poll

The 1967 Lamar Tech Cardinals football team represented the Lamar State College of Technology—now known as Lamar University as a member of the Southland Conference during the 1967 NCAA College Division football season. Led by fifth-year head coach Vernon Glass, the Cardinals compiled an overall record of 7–3 with a mark of 3–1 in conference play, placing second in the Southland. Lamar Tech played home games at Cardinal Stadium in Beaumont, Texas.

== Schedule ==
Date	Opponent	Rank	Site	Result	Attendance	Source
September 16	at New Mexico State*		Memorial Stadium; Las Cruces, NM	L 6–17	10,000	
September 23	Southwestern Louisiana*		Cardinal Stadium; Beaumont, TX (rivalry)	W 14–13	13,277	
September 30	Southeastern Louisiana*		Cardinal Stadium; Beaumont, TX	W 34–21	11,712	
October 7	Quantico Marines*		Cardinal Stadium; Beaumont, TX	W 41–6	11,014	
October 14	at Abilene Christian		Shotwell Stadium; Abilene, TX	W 54–13	3,000–4,000	
October 21	at McNeese State*		Cowboy Stadium; Lake Charles, LA (Battle of the Border)	W 24–8	11,000	
October 28	Arkansas State	No. 9	Cardinal Stadium; Beaumont, TX	W 28–23	14,279	
November 4	Trinity (TX)	No. 6	Cardinal Stadium; Beaumont, TX	W 6–0	15,132–15,153	
November 11	at Louisiana Tech*	No. 7	Tech Stadium; Ruston, LA	L 31–41	6,500–7,500	
November 18	at No. 6 UT Arlington		Memorial Stadium; Arlington, TX	L 10–16	10,500	
*Non-conference game; Rankings from AP Poll released prior to the game
