= 1967 North Dakota State Bison football team =

American college football season

1967 North Dakota State Bison football

NCC champion

Pecan Bowl, L 0–13 vs. UT Arlington
- Conference: North Central Conference
- Record: 9–1 (6–0 NCC)
- Head coach: Ron Erhardt (2nd season)
- Home stadium: Dacotah Field

1967 North Central Conference football standings
	Conf.					Overall
Team	W		L		T	W		L		T
North Dakota State $	6	–	0	–	0	9	–	1	–	0
State College of Iowa	5	–	1	–	0	7	–	3	–	0
North Dakota	4	–	2	–	0	4	–	6	–	0
Augustana (SD)	2	–	4	–	0	4	–	5	–	0
Morningside	2	–	4	–	0	4	–	5	–	0
South Dakota State	2	–	4	–	0	4	–	6	–	0
South Dakota	0	–	6	–	0	2	–	8	–	0
$ – Conference champion

The 1967 North Dakota State Bison football team was an American football team that represented North Dakota State University during the 1967 NCAA College Division football season as a member of the North Central Conference. In their second year under head coach Ron Erhardt, the team compiled a 9–1 record, finished as NCC champion, and lost in the Pecan Bowl to UT Arlington.

== Schedule ==
Date	Opponent	Rank	Site	Result	Attendance	Source
September 9	vs. Montana State*		Memorial Stadium; Great Falls, MT	W 24–6	8,000–10,000	
September 16	at Omaha*		Al F. Caniglia Field; Omaha, NE	W 41–33	6,000	
September 23	State College of Iowa	No. 2	Dacotah Field; Fargo, ND	W 10–9	10,050	
September 30	at South Dakota State	No. 4	Coughlin–Alumni Stadium; Brookings, SD (rivalry)	W 34–14	7,500	
October 7	Milwaukee*	No. 3	Dacotah Field; Fargo, ND	W 71–0	8,000	
October 14	at Augustana (SD)	No. 3	Howard Wood Field; Sioux Falls, SD	W 64–19	8,000	
October 21	North Dakota^{†}	No. 3	Dacotah Field; Fargo, ND (Nickel Trophy)	W 34–10	13,100–13,143	
October 28	South Dakota	No. 3	Dacotah Field; Fargo, ND	W 34–0	5,500	
November 4	at Morningside	No. 3	Roberts Field; Sioux City, IA	W 41–7	1,000	
December 16	vs. No. 6 UT Arlington*	No. 2	Shotwell Stadium; Abilene, TX (Pecan Bowl)	L 0–13	1,200	
*Non-conference game; ^{†}Homecoming; Rankings from AP Poll released prior to the game
