= 1967 College of Emporia Fighting Presbies football team =

American college football season

1967 College of Emporia Fighting Presbies football
- Conference: Kansas Collegiate Athletic Conference
- Record: 5–4 (5–4 KCAC)
- Head coach: Dick Banister (1st season)

1967 Kansas Collegiate Athletic Conference football standings
| | Conf. | | | | | Overall |
| Team | W | | L | | T | W | | L | | T |
|---|---|---|---|---|---|---|---|---|---|---|
| No. 15 Southwestern (KS) $ | 9 | – | 0 | – | 0 | 9 | – | 0 | – | 1 |
| Ottawa | 8 | – | 1 | – | 0 | 8 | – | 1 | – | 0 |
| Baker | 6 | – | 3 | – | 0 | 6 | – | 3 | – | 0 |
| Kansas Wesleyan | 6 | – | 3 | – | 0 | 6 | – | 3 | – | 0 |
| College of Emporia | 5 | – | 4 | – | 0 | 5 | – | 4 | – | 0 |
| Friends | 4 | – | 4 | – | 1 | 4 | – | 4 | – | 1 |
| Sterling | 3 | – | 5 | – | 1 | 3 | – | 5 | – | 1 |
| Bethany (KS) | 2 | – | 7 | – | 0 | 2 | – | 7 | – | 0 |
| Bethel (KS) | 1 | – | 8 | – | 0 | 1 | – | 8 | – | 0 |
| McPherson | 0 | – | 9 | – | 0 | 0 | – | 9 | – | 0 |
$ – Conference champion; Rankings from NAIA poll

The 1967 College of Emporia Fighting Presbies football team represented the College of Emporia as a member of the Kansas Collegiate Athletic Conference (KCAC) during the 1967 NAIA football season. Led by first-year head coach Dick Banister, the Presbies compiled an overall record of 5–4 record with an identical mark in conference play, placing fifth in the KCAC.

== Schedule ==
| Date | Opponent | Site | Result | Source |
|---|---|---|---|---|
| September 16 | McPherson | Emporia, KS | W 22–7 | |
| September 22 | at Bethany (KS) | Lindsborg, KS | W 19–0 | |
| September 30 | at Baker | Baldwin City, KS | L 7–35 | |
| October 7 | Ottawa (KS) | Emporia, KS | L 0–10 | |
| October 14 | at Bethel (KS) | North Newton, KS | W 52–7 | |
| October 21 | Sterling^{†} | Emporia, KS | W 33–0 | |
| October 28 | Friends | Emporia, KS | W 40–19 | |
| November 4 | at Kansas Wesleyan | Salina, KS | L 20–25 | |
| November 11 | Southwestern (KS) | Emporia, KS | L 10–25 | |
^{†}Homecoming
