= 1967 North Dakota Fighting Sioux football team =

American college football season

1967 North Dakota Fighting Sioux football
- Conference: North Central Conference
- Record: 4–6 (4–2 NCC)
- Head coach: Marvin C. Helling (10th season)
- Home stadium: Memorial Stadium

1967 North Central Conference football standings
	Conf.					Overall
Team	W		L		T	W		L		T
North Dakota State $	6	–	0	–	0	9	–	1	–	0
State College of Iowa	5	–	1	–	0	7	–	3	–	0
North Dakota	4	–	2	–	0	4	–	6	–	0
Augustana (SD)	2	–	4	–	0	4	–	5	–	0
Morningside	2	–	4	–	0	4	–	5	–	0
South Dakota State	2	–	4	–	0	4	–	6	–	0
South Dakota	0	–	6	–	0	2	–	8	–	0
$ – Conference champion

The 1967 North Dakota Fighting Sioux football team, also known as the Nodaks, was an American football team that represented the University of North Dakota in the North Central Conference (NCC) during the 1967 NCAA College Division football season. In its tenth year under head coach Marvin C. Helling, the team compiled a 4–6 record (4–2 against NCC opponents), finished in third place out of seven teams in the NCC, and was outscored by a total of 164 to 123. The team played its home games at Memorial Stadium in Grand Forks, North Dakota.

== Schedule ==
Date	Opponent	Site	Result	Attendance	Source
September 9	at Northern Arizona*	Lumberjack Stadium; Flagstaff, AZ	L 10–39	5,100–6,300	
September 16	Montana*	Memorial Stadium; Grand Forks, ND	L 14–19	8,100	
September 23	Morningside	Memorial Stadium; Grand Forks, ND	W 14–0	7,065	
September 30	at State College of Iowa	O. R. Latham Stadium; Cedar Falls, IA	L 0–7	7,000	
October 7	at South Dakota	Inman Field; Vermillion, SD (Sitting Bull Trophy)	W 9–6	4,500	
October 14	South Dakota State	Memorial Stadium; Grand Forks, ND	W 9–7	8,678	
October 21	at No. 3 North Dakota State	Dacotah Field; Fargo, ND (Nickel Trophy)	L 10–34	13,100–13,143	
October 28	at Montana State*	Gatton Field; Bozeman, MT	L 16–20	4,500–4,600	
November 4	Augustana (SD)	Memorial Stadium; Grand Forks, ND	W 35–7	2,155	
November 11	No. 8 Northern Michigan*	Memorial Stadium; Grand Forks, ND	L 6–25	3,070	
*Non-conference game; Rankings from AP Poll released prior to the game
