= 1967 UT Arlington Rebels football team =

American college football season

1967 UT Arlington Rebels football

Southland champion

Pecan Bowl, W 13–0 vs. North Dakota State
- Conference: Southland Conference
- Record: 10–1 (4–0 Southland)
- Head coach: Burley Bearden (2nd season)
- Home stadium: Memorial Stadium

1967 Southland Conference football standings
	Conf.					Overall
Team	W		L		T	W		L		T
No. 6 UT Arlington $	4	–	0	–	0	10	–	1	–	0
Lamar Tech	3	–	1	–	0	7	–	3	–	0
Arkansas State	2	–	2	–	0	4	–	5	–	0
Trinity (TX)	1	–	3	–	0	3	–	7	–	0
Abilene Christian	0	–	4	–	0	3	–	6	–	0
$ – Conference champion; Rankings from AP small college poll

The 1967 UT Arlington Rebels football team was an American football team that represented the University of Texas at Arlington in the Southland Conference during the 1967 NCAA College Division football season. In their second year under head coach Burley Bearden, the team compiled a 10–1 record, were Southland Conference champion and won the Pecan Bowl.

== Schedule ==
Date	Opponent	Rank	Site	Result	Attendance	Source
September 16	Cal State Los Angeles*		Memorial Stadium; Arlington, TX	W 17–14	8,000	
September 23	New Mexico State*	No. 9	Memorial Stadium; Arlington, TX	W 15–14	8,500	
September 30	at East Texas State*	No. 7	Memorial Stadium; Commerce, TX	W 7–6	10,000	
October 7	at McNeese State*	No. 7	Cowboy Stadium; Lake Charles, LA	W 17–16	10,000	
October 14	Tarleton State*	No. 6	Memorial Stadium; Arlington, TX	W 37–7	8,500	
October 21	at Trinity (TX)	No. 6	Alamo Stadium; San Antonio, TX	W 31–16	1,969	
October 28	at West Texas State*	No. 4	Buffalo Bowl; Canyon, TX	L 27–37	17,550	
November 4	Abilene Christian	No. 5	Memorial Stadium; Arlington, TX	W 34–7	10,050–10,500	
November 11	at Arkansas State	No. 6	Kays Stadium; Jonesboro, AR	W 16–14	5,600–5,675	
November 18	Lamar Tech	No. 6	Memorial Stadium; Arlington, TX	W 16–10	10,500	
December 16	vs. No. 2 North Dakota State*	No. 6	Shotwell Stadium; Abilene, TX (Pecan Bowl)	W 13–0	1,200	
*Non-conference game; Rankings from AP Poll released prior to the game
