= 1969 Delaware State Hornets football team =

American college football season

1969 Delaware State Hornets football
- Conference: Central Intercollegiate Athletic Association
- Record: 4–5 (3–3 CIAA)
- Head coach: Arnold Jeter (3rd season)
- Home stadium: Alumni Stadium

1969 Central Intercollegiate Athletic Association football standings
	Conf.					Overall
Team	W		L		T	W		L		T
Johnson C. Smith $	6	–	1	–	0	8	–	2	–	0
North Carolina Central	7	–	1	–	1	7	–	2	–	1
Elizabeth City State	8	–	1	–	0	8	–	1	–	0
North Carolina A&T	5	–	1	–	1	6	–	2	–	1
Morgan State	6	–	2	–	0	6	–	4	–	0
Norfolk State	4	–	3	–	0	4	–	4	–	0
Virginia Union	5	–	4	–	0	5	–	4	–	0
Livingstone	4	–	3	–	0	5	–	3	–	0
Delaware State	3	–	3	–	0	4	–	5	–	0
Fayetteville State	3	–	3	–	1	3	–	4	–	1
Virginia State	3	–	5	–	1	3	–	5	–	1
Howard	2	–	3	–	0	3	–	6	–	0
Shaw	2	–	5	–	0	2	–	6	–	0
Maryland State	1	–	5	–	0	1	–	7	–	0
Winston-Salem State	1	–	7	–	0	2	–	7	–	0
Saint Paul's (VA)	0	–	6	–	0	1	–	7	–	0
Hampton	0	–	7	–	0	0	–	9	–	0
$ – Conference champion; Conference standings were determined by Dickinson Rating

The 1969 Delaware State Hornets football team represented Delaware State College—now known as Delaware State University—as a member of the Central Intercollegiate Athletic Association (CIAA) in the 1969 NCAA College Division football season. Led by third-year head coach Arnold Jeter, the Hornets compiled an overall record of 4–5 and a mark of 3–3 in conference play, placing ninth in the CIAA.

== Schedule ==
Date	Opponent	Site	Result	Attendance	Source
September 20	at Clarion*	Clarion, PA	L 14–20		
September 27	Montclair State*	Alumni Stadium; Dover, DE	W 28–9		
October 4	at Hampton	Armstrong Stadium; Hampton, VA	W 20–0		
October 11	Howard	Alumni Stadium; Dover, DE	W 10–0		
October 18	at Saint Paul's (VA)	Lawrenceville, VA	W 27–20		
October 25	Morgan State	Alumni Stadium; Dover, DE	L 3–38	1,800	
November 1	at East Stroudsburg*	East Stroudsburg, PA	L 12–35		
November 8	Elizabeth City State	Alumni Stadium; Dover, DE	L 6–31		
November 15	Maryland State	Alumni Stadium; Dover, DE	L 19–21		
*Non-conference game
