= 1967 Arkansas State Indians football team =

American college football season

1967 Arkansas State Indians football
- Conference: Southland Conference
- Record: 4–5 (2–2 Southland)
- Head coach: Bennie Ellender (5th season)
- Home stadium: Kays Stadium; War Memorial Stadium

1967 Southland Conference football standings
| | Conf. | | | | | Overall |
| Team | W | | L | | T | W | | L | | T |
|---|---|---|---|---|---|---|---|---|---|---|
| No. 6 UT Arlington $ | 4 | – | 0 | – | 0 | 10 | – | 1 | – | 0 |
| Lamar Tech | 3 | – | 1 | – | 0 | 7 | – | 3 | – | 0 |
| Arkansas State | 2 | – | 2 | – | 0 | 4 | – | 5 | – | 0 |
| Trinity (TX) | 1 | – | 3 | – | 0 | 3 | – | 7 | – | 0 |
| Abilene Christian | 0 | – | 4 | – | 0 | 3 | – | 6 | – | 0 |
$ – Conference champion; Rankings from AP small college poll

The 1967 Arkansas State Indians football team represented Arkansas State College—now known as Arkansas State University—as a member of the Southland Conference during the 1967 NCAA College Division football season. Led by fifth-year head coach Bennie Ellender, the Indians compiled an overall record of 4–5 with a mark of 2–2 in conference play, placing third in the Southland.

== Schedule ==
| Date | Opponent | Rank | Site | Result | Attendance | Source |
|---|---|---|---|---|---|---|
| September 23 | Western Michigan* | No. 5 | Kays Stadium; Jonesboro, AR | W 21–8 | 7,950–7,953 | |
| September 30 | at Tennessee Tech* | No. 3 | Tucker Stadium; Cookeville, TN | W 15–7 | 6,000 | |
| October 7 | The Citadel* | No. 4 | War Memorial Stadium; Little Rock, AR | L 7–20 | 17,033 | |
| October 14 | at Louisiana Tech* | No. 7 | Tech Stadium; Ruston, LA | L 3–6 | 10,000 | |
| October 21 | Abilene Christian | | Kays Stadium; Jonesboro, AR | W 24–14 | 8,527 | |
| October 28 | at No. 9 Lamar Tech | | Cardinal Stadium; Beaumont, TX | L 23–28 | 14,279 | |
| November 4 | Southwestern Louisiana* | | Kays Stadium; Jonesboro, AR | L 6–7 | 5,300 | |
| November 11 | No. 6 UT Arlington | | Kays Stadium; Jonesboro, AR | L 14–16 | 5,600–5,675 | |
| November 18 | at Trinity (TX) | | Alamo Stadium; San Antonio, TX | W 13–10 | 1,200–1,202 | |
*Non-conference game; Rankings from AP Poll released prior to the game
