= 1967 Florida A&M Rattlers football team =

American college football season

1967 Florida A&M Rattlers football

SIAC Division I champion

Orange Blossom Classic, L 25–28 vs. Grambling
- Conference: Southern Intercollegiate Athletic Conference
- Division I
- Record: 8–2 (5–0 SIAC)
- Head coach: Jake Gaither (23rd season)
- Home stadium: Bragg Memorial Stadium

The 1967 Florida A&M Rattlers football team represented Florida A&M University as a member of Division I of the Southern Intercollegiate Athletic Conference (SIAC) during the 1967 NCAA College Division football season. Led by 23rd-year head coach Jake Gaither, the Rattlers finished the season overall record of 8–2 and a mark of 5–0 in conference play, and won the SIAC Division I title. Florida A&M was defeated by Grambling in the Orange Blossom Classic.

== Schedule ==
Date	Opponent	Site	Result	Attendance	Source
September 16	at Allen	Perry Stadium; Columbia, SC	W 43–0	7,000	
September 23	South Carolina State	Bragg Memorial Stadium; Tallahassee, FL	W 25–0	10,000	
October 7	at Alabama A&M	Milton Frank Stadium; Huntsville, AL	W 45–36		
October 14	Morris Brown	Bragg Memorial Stadium; Tallahassee, FL	W 44–0	11,000	
October 21	at Tennessee A&I*	Hale Stadium; Nashville, TN	L 8–32		
November 4	at North Carolina A&T*	World War Memorial Stadium; Greensboro, NC	W 63–6	7,000	
November 11	Southern*	Bragg Memorial Stadium; Tallahassee, FL	W 36–25		
November 18	Bethune–Cookman	Bragg Memorial Stadium; Tallahassee, FL (Florida Classic)	W 30–6		
November 25	vs. Texas Southern*	Tampa Stadium; Tampa, FL (Golden Triangle Classic)	W 30–7		
December 2	vs. Grambling*	Miami Orange Bowl; Miami, FL (Orange Blossom Classic)	L 25–28	37,681	
*Non-conference game; Source:
