= 1968 Delaware State Hornets football team =

American college football season

1968 Delaware State Hornets football
- Conference: Central Intercollegiate Athletic Association
- Record: 4–6 (2–4 CIAA)
- Head coach: Arnold Jeter (2nd season)
- Home stadium: Alumni Stadium

1968 Central Intercollegiate Athletic Association football standings
| | Conf. | | | | | Overall |
| Team | W | | L | | T | W | | L | | T |
|---|---|---|---|---|---|---|---|---|---|---|
| No. 12 Morgan State $ | 7 | – | 1 | – | 0 | 8 | – | 1 | – | 0 |
| No. 14 North Carolina A&T | 6 | – | 1 | – | 0 | 8 | – | 1 | – | 0 |
| North Carolina College | 6 | – | 2 | – | 0 | 6 | – | 2 | – | 0 |
| Elizabeth City State | 7 | – | 1 | – | 0 | 8 | – | 1 | – | 0 |
| Maryland State | 3 | – | 2 | – | 1 | 5 | – | 2 | – | 1 |
| Virginia State | 5 | – | 2 | – | 1 | 5 | – | 2 | – | 1 |
| Hampton | 4 | – | 2 | – | 1 | 4 | – | 3 | – | 2 |
| Livingstone | 4 | – | 3 | – | 0 | 4 | – | 4 | – | 0 |
| Howard | 2 | – | 3 | – | 0 | 3 | – | 5 | – | 0 |
| Norfolk State | 2 | – | 4 | – | 1 | 2 | – | 5 | – | 1 |
| Johnson C. Smith | 3 | – | 3 | – | 0 | 5 | – | 4 | – | 0 |
| Virginia Union | 2 | – | 6 | – | 0 | 3 | – | 6 | – | 0 |
| Delaware State | 2 | – | 4 | – | 0 | 4 | – | 6 | – | 0 |
| Winston-Salem State | 2 | – | 5 | – | 1 | 3 | – | 5 | – | 1 |
| Fayetteville State | 2 | – | 5 | – | 0 | 2 | – | 5 | – | 0 |
| Shaw | 1 | – | 7 | – | 1 | 1 | – | 7 | – | 1 |
| Saint Paul's (VA) | 0 | – | 7 | – | 0 | 1 | – | 7 | – | 0 |
$ – Conference champion; Conference standings were determined by Dickinson Rating; Rankings from NAIA poll for North Carolina A&T and AP small college poll for Morgan State

The 1968 Delaware State Hornets football team represented Delaware State College—now known as Delaware State University—as a member of the Central Intercollegiate Athletic Association (CIAA) in the 1968 NCAA College Division football season. Led by second-year head coach Arnold Jeter and quarterback Norris Saunders, the Hornets compiled an overall record of 4–6 and a mark of 2–4 in conference play, placing 13th in the CIAA.

== Schedule ==
| Date | Opponent | Site | Result | Attendance | Source |
|---|---|---|---|---|---|
| September 14 | at IUP* | Indiana, PA | L 0–17 | | |
| September 21 | Clarion* | Alumni Stadium; Dover, DE | W 34–22 | 750 | |
| September 28 | Montclair State* | Alumni Stadium; Dover, DE | W 34–14 | | |
| October 5 | Hampton | Alumni Stadium; Dover, DE | L 10–17 | | |
| October 12 | at Howard | Washington, DC | W 48–7 | | |
| October 19 | Saint Paul's (VA) | Alumni Stadium; Dover, DE | W 25–0 | | |
| October 26 | at No. 12 Morgan State | Hughes Stadium; Baltimore, MD | L 3–38 | | |
| November 2 | East Stroudsburg* | Alumni Stadium; Dover, DE | L 7–47 | | |
| November 9 | at Elizabeth City State | Elizabeth City, NC | L 3–10 | | |
| November 16 | at Maryland State | Princess Anne, MD | L 20–33 | | |
*Non-conference game; Rankings from AP Poll released prior to the game
