= 1967 small college football rankings =

- Selectors: AP, UPI
- No. 1: San Diego State
- Small college football rankings (AP, UPI)
- «1966 1968»

The 1967 small college football rankings are rankings of college football teams representing smaller college and university teams during the 1967 college football season, including the 1967 NCAA College Division football season and the 1967 NAIA football season. Separate rankings were published by the Associated Press (AP) and the United Press International (UPI). The AP rankings were selected by a board of sports writers, and the UPI rankings were selected by a board of small-college coaches.

The 1967 San Diego State Aztecs football team (10–1), led by head coach Don Coryell, was rated as the small-college champion by both the AP and UPI. The Aztecs' only loss was to a University Division team, Utah State. North Dakota State was ranked second by both, then lost to Texas–Arlington in the Pecan Bowl.

== Legend ==
| | Increase in ranking |
| | Decrease in ranking |
| | Not ranked previous week |
| (#–#) | Win–loss record |
| (Italics) | Number of first place votes |
| т | Tied with team above or below also with this symbol |

== AP poll ==
| | Week 1 Sept 21 | Week 2 Sept 28 | Week 3 Oct 5 | Week 4 Oct 12 | Week 5 Oct 19 | Week 6 Oct 26 | Week 7 Nov 2 | Week 8 Nov 9 | Week 9 Nov 16 | Week 10 Nov 23 | |
|---|---|---|---|---|---|---|---|---|---|---|---|
| 1. | San Diego State (8) | San Diego State (12) | San Diego State (5) | San Diego State (6) | San Diego State (5–0) (4) | San Diego State (6–0) (5) | San Diego State (7–0) (7) | San Diego State (7–0) (6) | San Diego State (8–0) (5) | San Diego State (9–0) (12) | 1. |
| 2. | North Dakota State (2) | Tennessee State (1) | Waynesburg (1) | Waynesburg (3) | Waynesburg (5–0) (3) | Waynesburg (6–0) (5) | Waynesburg (7–0) (5) | North Dakota State (9–0) (3) | North Dakota State (9–0) (2) | North Dakota State (9–0) (2) | 2. |
| 3. | Waynesburg (2) | Arkansas State (2) | North Dakota State (1) | North Dakota State (1) | North Dakota State (6–0) (1) | North Dakota State (7–0) (1) | North Dakota State (8–0) (1) | Eastern Kentucky (2) | Eastern Kentucky (7–1–1) (2) | New Mexico Highlands (9–0) (1) | 3. |
| 4. | Tennessee State | North Dakota State (1) | Arkansas State (2) | Northwestern State (1) | Eastern Kentucky (4–1) | Texas–Arlington (6–0) | Eastern Kentucky | New Mexico Highlands (8–0) (1) | New Mexico Highlands (8–0) (1) | Texas A&I (9–0) (1) | 4. |
| 5. | Arkansas State | Waynesburg (1) | Northwestern State (1) | Parsons | Northwestern State (4–0) (1) | Northwestern State (5–0) (1) | Texas–Arlington (6–1) | Waynesburg | Waynesburg (8–1) | Eastern Kentucky | 5. |
| 6. | Weber State | Northwestern State | Parsons | Texas–Arlington | Texas–Arlington (5–0) | Eastern Kentucky | Lamar Tech | Texas–Arlington (7–1) | Texas–Arlington (8–1) | Texas–Arlington (9–1) | 6. |
| 7. | Northwestern State (Note: In the actual printed polls, Northwestern State was listed as Northwestern Louisiana) | Texas–Arlington | Texas–Arlington | Arkansas State | Parsons (4–0) | Wittenberg (5–0) | New Mexico Highlands (6–0) | Lamar Tech | Northern Michigan (9–0) | Waynesburg (8–1) | 7. |
| 8. | West Chester | Parsons | Tennessee State | Tennessee–Martin (1) | Northern Arizona (4–2) | Northern Arizona | Southwest Texas State (7–0) (2) | Northern Michigan (8–0) | Texas A&I (8–0) (1) | Northern Michigan (9–0) | 8. |
| 9. | Texas–Arlington (Note: In the actual printed polls, Texas–Arlington was listed as Texas at Arlington (AP) or Arlington State (UPI)) | Florida A&M | Presbyterian | Eastern Kentucky | Tennessee–Martin (4–0) | Lamar Tech | Northwestern State | Texas A&I | Southwest Texas State (9–0) | Morgan State | 9. |
| 10. | Florida A&M | Montana State | Tennessee–Martin (1) | Wittenberg | Wittenberg (4–0) | Parsons | Northern Michigan (7–0) (1) | Southwest Texas State (8–0) | Morgan State (7–0) | Southwest Texas State | 10. |
| | Week 1 Sept 21 | Week 2 Sept 28 | Week 3 Oct 5 | Week 4 Oct 12 | Week 5 Oct 19 | Week 6 Oct 26 | Week 7 Nov 2 | Week 8 Nov 9 | Week 9 Nov 16 | Week 10 Nov 23 | |
| | | Dropped: 6 Weber State; 8 West Chester | Dropped: 9 Florida A&M; 10 Montana State | Dropped: 8 Tennessee State; 9 Presbyterian | Dropped: 7 Arkansas State | Dropped: 9 Tennessee–Martin | Dropped: 7 Wittenberg; 8 Northern Arizona; 10 Parsons | Dropped: 9 Northwestern State | Dropped: 7 Lamar Tech | None | |

== UPI coaches poll ==
| | Week 1 Sept 27 | Week 2 Oct 4 | Week 3 Oct 11 | Week 4 Oct 18 | Week 5 Oct 25 | Week 6 Nov 1 | Week 7 Nov 8 | Week 8 Nov 15 | Week 9 Nov 22 | Week 10 Nov 29 | |
|---|---|---|---|---|---|---|---|---|---|---|---|
| 1. | San Diego State (17) | San Diego State (17) | San Diego State (27) | San Diego State (5–0) (28) | San Diego State (6–0) (31) | San Diego State (7–0) (32) | San Diego State (7–0) (29) | San Diego State (8–0) (31) | San Diego State (9–0) (31) | San Diego State (9–1) (17) | 1. |
| 2. | North Dakota State (1) | North Dakota State (1) | North Dakota State (2) | North Dakota State (6–0) (1) | North Dakota State (7–0) | North Dakota State (8–0) | North Dakota State (9–0) (1) | North Dakota State (9–0) | North Dakota State (9–0) (1) | North Dakota State (9–0) (14) | 2. |
| 3. | Tennessee State (1) | Waynesburg | Waynesburg | Waynesburg (5–0) | Waynesburg (6–0) | Waynesburg (7–0) | New Mexico Highlands (8–0) (3) | New Mexico Highlands (8–0) (2) | New Mexico Highlands (9–0) (2) | Texas–Arlington (9–1) (2) | 3. |
| 4. | Waynesburg | Ball State | New Mexico Highlands | New Mexico Highlands (4–0) (3) | New Mexico Highlands (5–0) (2) | New Mexico Highlands (6–0) (2) | Northern Michigan (8–0) (1) | Northern Michigan (9–0) | Northern Michigan (9–0) (1) | Fairmont State (10–0) (1) | 4. |
| 5. | Texas–Arlington | Arkansas State (1) | Texas Southern | Texas Southern (5–0) | Texas–Arlington (6–0) | Montana State (6–2) (1) | Montana State (7–2) | Montana State (7–2) | Texas–Arlington (9–1) | West Chester (9–0) (1) | 5. |
| 6. | Ball State | Texas Southern | Northwestern State | Texas–Arlington (4–0) | Texas Southern (5–0) | Northern Michigan (7–0) | Santa Clara (6–0) | Santa Clara (7–0) | West Chester (9–0) | Eastern Washington (11–0) (1) | 6. |
| 7. | Northwestern State | Northwestern State | Texas–Arlington (1) | Northwestern State (4–0) | Northwestern State (5–0) | Santa Clara (5–0) | Texas–Arlington (7–1) | Texas–Arlington (8–1) (1) | Fairmont State (9–0) | Texas A&I (9–0) | 7. |
| 8. | Arkansas State | New Mexico Highlands (1) | Montana State | Montana State (4–2) | Montana State (5–2) | Texas–Arlington (6–1) | Southwest Texas State (8–0) (1) | Southwest Texas State (9–0) | Texas A&I (9–0) | New Mexico Highlands (9–1) | 8. |
| 9. | New Mexico Highlands | Texas–Arlington (1) | Hofstra | Northern Michigan (5–0) (2) | Northern Michigan (6–0) (1) | Southwest Texas State (7–0) | West Chester (7–0) | West Chester (8–0) | Waynesburg (8–1) | Northern Michigan (9–1) | 9. |
| 10. | Florida A&M | Hofstra | Northern Michigan | Parsons | Wittenberg (5–0) | West Chester (6–0) | Fairmont State (7–0) | Fairmont State (8–0) | Santa Clara (7–1) | Waynesburg (8–1) | 10. |
| 11. | Kearney State | West Chester | West Chester | Santa Clara | Santa Clara | Kearney State | Eastern Kentucky | Eastern Kentucky (7–1–1) | Eastern Kentucky | Eastern Kentucky | 11. |
| 12. | Hofstra | Montana State | Santa Clara | West Chester | West Chester | Texas Southern | Waynesburg | Waynesburg (8–1) | Wagner | Santa Clara | 12. |
| 13. | Montana State | Florida A&M | Florida A&M | Florida A&M | Kearney State | Northwestern State | Kearney State | Wagner | Eastern Washington | Southwest Texas State | 13. |
| 14. | North Dakota | Northern Michigan | Wittenberg | Kearney State | Southwest Texas State | Lamar Tech | Wagner | Kearney State | San Francisco State | Wagner | 14. |
| 15. | West Chester | Santa Clara | UC Santa Barbara | Wittenberg (4–0) | Parsons | Eastern Kentucky | Adams State | Texas Southern | Southwest Texas State | Adams State | 15. |
| 16. | San Francisco State | UC Santa Barbara | Arkansas State | Eastern Kentucky | Lamar Tech | Tennessee–Martin | Lamar Tech | Adams State | Texas Southern | Kearney State | 16. |
| 17. | Northern Michigan | Kearney State | Kearney State | Southwest Texas State | Eastern Kentucky | Adams State | Chattanooga | Texas A&I (8–0) | Montana State | San Francisco State | 17. |
| 18. | UC Santa Barbara | Temple | Parsons | Hofstra | Tennessee–Martin | Wittenberg | Texas Southern | Eastern Washington | Adams State | Montana State | 18. |
| 19. | UMass (Note: In the actual printed polls, UMass was listed as Massachusetts) | Wittenberg | Montana | Chattanooga | Adams State | Eastern Washington | Eastern Washington | San Francisco State | Tennessee–Martin | Tennessee–Martin | 19. |
| 20. | Boston University | Adams State | Southwest Texas State | Lamar Tech | Hofstra | Chattanooga | Tennessee–Martin | Tennessee–Martin | UMass | Wittenberg | 20. |
| 21. | | | Chattanooga | | | Montana | Wittenberg | UMass | | | 21. |
| | Week 1 Sept 27 | Week 2 Oct 4 | Week 3 Oct 11 | Week 4 Oct 18 | Week 5 Oct 25 | Week 6 Nov 1 | Week 7 Nov 8 | Week 8 Nov 15 | Week 9 Nov 22 | Week 10 Nov 29 | |
| | | Dropped: 3 Tennessee State; 14 North Dakota; 16 San Francisco State; 19 UMass; 20 Boston University | Dropped: 4 Ball State; 18 Temple; 20 Adams State | Dropped: 15 UC Santa Barbara; 16 Arkansas State; 19 Montana | Dropped: 13 Florida A&M; 19 Chattanooga | Dropped: 15 Parsons; 20 Hofstra | Dropped: 13 Northwestern State; 20 Montana | Dropped: 16 Lamar Tech; 17 Chattanooga; 20 Wittenberg | Dropped: 14 Kearney State | Dropped: 16 Texas Southern; 20 UMass | |

== HBCU rankings ==
The New Pittsburgh Courier, a leading African American newspaper, ranked the top 1967 teams from historically black colleges and universities in an era when college football was often racially segregated.

The rankings were published on December 16:

- 1. Morgan State (8–0)
- 2. Grambling (9–1)
- 3. Tuskegee (8–0–1)
- 4. Florida A&M (8–2)
- 5. South Carolina State (7–1)
- 6. Alabama State (9–1)
- 7. Tennessee A&I (6–3)
- 8. Jackson State (6–3)
- 9. Bethune-Cookman (5–2)
- 10. Maryland State (5–2)
- 11. Virginia State (4–3–1)
- 12. Elizabeth City State (7–2)
- 13. Kentucky State (5–3–1)
- 14. Alcorn A&M (5–4)
- 15. Southern (5–5)
- 16. Johnson C. Smith (6–2–1)
- 17. Savannah State (6–2–1)
- 18. Arkansas AM&N (6–4)
- 19. Virginia Union (5–3)
- 20. Edward Waters (5–3–1)
- 21. Fort Valley State (4–3–2)
- 22. Prairie View A&M (5–5)
