= 1967 Morgan State Bears football team =

American college football season

1967 Morgan State Bears football

Black college national co-champion CIAA champion
- Conference: Central Intercollegiate Athletic Association
- Record: 8–0 (8–0 CIAA)
- Head coach: Earl Banks (8th season)
- Home stadium: Hughes Stadium

1967 Central Intercollegiate Athletic Association football standings
	Conf.					Overall
Team	W		L		T	W		L		T
No. 9 Morgan State $	8	–	0	–	0	8	–	0	–	0
Maryland State	5	–	1	–	0	5	–	2	–	0
Johnson C. Smith	5	–	0	–	1	6	–	2	–	1
Virginia Union	5	–	3	–	0	5	–	3	–	0
North Carolina A&T	3	–	3	–	1	3	–	5	–	1
Elizabeth City State	6	–	2	–	0	7	–	2	–	0
Virginia State	4	–	3	–	1	4	–	3	–	1
Norfolk State	3	–	4	–	0	4	–	4	–	0
Delaware State	2	–	3	–	1	2	–	6	–	1
Hampton	3	–	4	–	0	3	–	5	–	0
Winston-Salem State	3	–	4	–	0	3	–	5	–	0
Howard	2	–	3	–	0	2	–	6	–	0
Livingstone	2	–	4	–	0	2	–	6	–	0
North Carolina College	1	–	5	–	1	1	–	7	–	1
Fayetteville State	1	–	4	–	1	2	–	5	–	1
Saint Paul's (VA)	1	–	5	–	1	2	–	5	–	1
Shaw	1	–	7	–	1	1	–	7	–	1
$ – Conference champion; Rankings from AP small college poll

The 1967 Morgan State Bears football team was an American football team that represented Morgan State College in the Central Intercollegiate Athletic Association (CIAA) during the 1967 NCAA College Division football season. In their eighth season under head coach Earl Banks, the Bears compiled a perfect 8–0 record, won the CIAA championship, and outscored all opponents by a total of 285 to 78.

The Bears were recognized by the New Pittsburgh Courier as the black college national co-champion. They were also ranked No. 9 in the final Associated Press small college rankings.

== Schedule ==
Date	Opponent	Rank	Site	Result	Attendance	Source
September 30	at North Carolina College		O'Kelly Field; Durham, NC	W 23–0		
October 7	Maryland State		Hughes Stadium; Baltimore, MD	W 36–26	8,000	
October 14	at Virginia Union		Hovey Field; Richmond, VA	W 47–16		
October 21	at Delaware State		Alumni Stadium; Dover, DE	W 27–0	3,500	
October 28	North Carolina A&T		Memorial Stadium; Baltimore, MD	W 27–20		
November 4	at Hampton		Armstrong Stadium; Hampton, VA	W 28–13		
November 11	Norfolk State		Hughes Stadium; Baltimore, MD	W 63–0		
November 18	Virginia State	No. 10	Hughes Stadium; Baltimore, MD	W 34–3		
Rankings from AP Poll released prior to the game
