= 1967 Lawrence Vikings football team =

American college football season

1967 Lawrence Vikings football
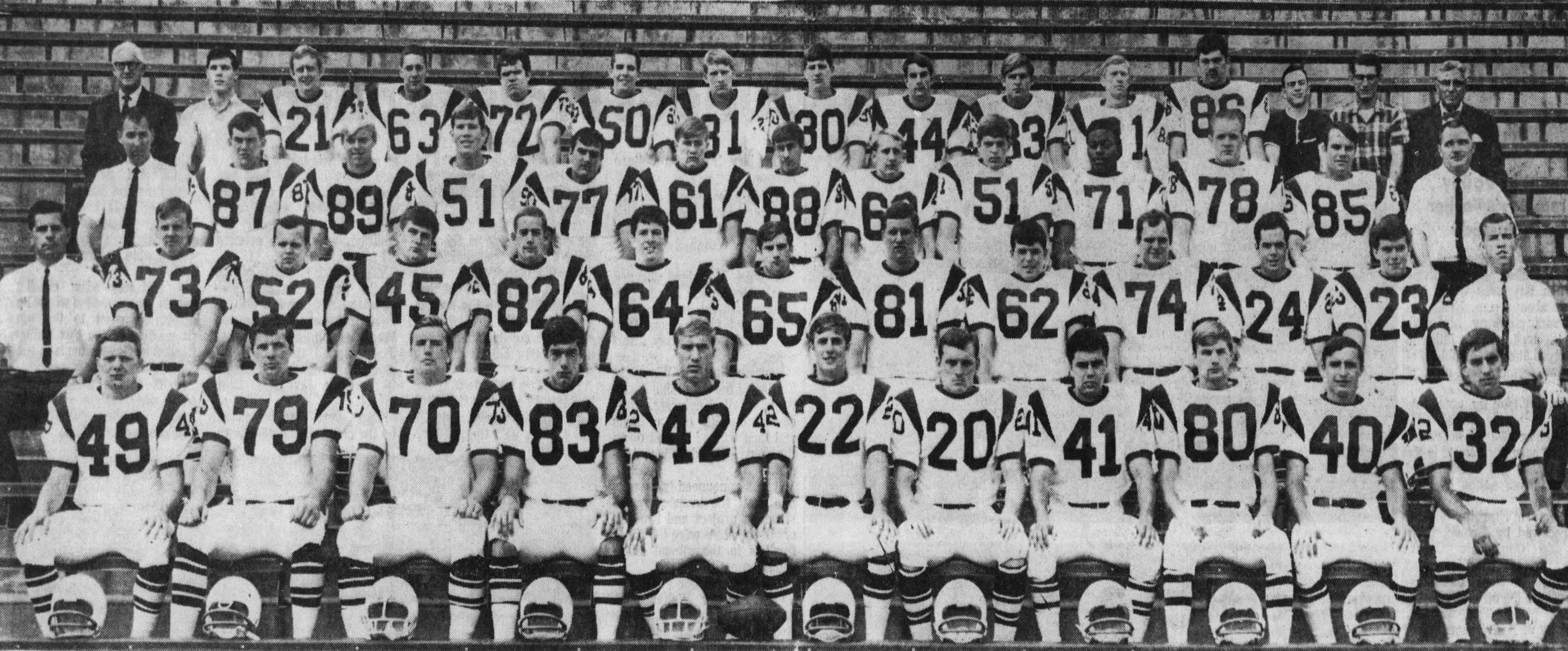

MWC champion
- Conference: Midwest Conference
- Record: 8–0 (8–0 MWC)
- Head coach: Ron Roberts (3rd season)
- Captains: Chuck McKee; Gary Hietpas
- Home stadium: Lawrence Bowl

1967 Midwest Conference football standings
	Conf.					Overall
Team	W		L		T	W		L		T
Lawrence $	8	–	0	–	0	8	–	0	–	0
St. Olaf	6	–	2	–	0	6	–	2	–	0
Monmouth (IL)	5	–	3	–	0	5	–	3	–	0
Beloit	4	–	4	–	0	4	–	4	–	0
Coe	4	–	4	–	0	4	–	4	–	0
Cornell (IA)	4	–	4	–	0	4	–	4	–	0
Ripon	4	–	4	–	0	4	–	4	–	0
Carleton	2	–	5	–	1	2	–	5	–	1
Grinnell	2	–	6	–	0	2	–	6	–	0
Knox	0	–	7	–	1	0	–	7	–	1
$ – Conference champion

The 1967 Lawrence Vikings football team was an American football team that represented Lawrence University as a member of the Midwest Conference (MWC) during the 1967 NCAA College Division football season. In their third year under head coach Ron Roberts, the Vikings compiled a perfect 8–0 record (8–0 in conference games), won the MWC championship, and outscored all opponents by a total of 213 to 67. It was the first undefeated Lawrence team since 1951.

Lawrence gained 1,715 rushing yards (214.4 per game) and 1,193 passing yards (91 completions in 197 attempts) On defense, they held opponents to only 720 rushing yards (90 per game) and 974 passing yards with 25 pass interceptions.

The team's leading players included the following:

- Quarterback Charles McKee led the team with 1,772 yards of total offense (650 rushing, 1,122 passing). After the season, he was selected as the first-team quarterback on the 1967 Little All-America college football team.
- Rod Clark led the team in receiving with 24 catches for 343 yards and two touchdowns.
- Free safety John Biolo intercepted 11 passes.
- Co-captain Gary Hietpas was selected as the team's most valuable defensive player.

The team's assistant coaches were Bob Mueller, Ted Ross, Clyde Rusk, and Pete Thomas.

The team played its home games at the Lawrence Bowl in Appleton, Wisconsin.

== Schedule ==
Date	Opponent	Site	Result	Attendance	Source
September 23	at Coe	Cedar Rapids, IA	W 22–13		
September 30	at Carleton	Northfield, MN	W 21–12		
October 7	St. Olaf	Lawrence Bowl; Appleton, WI	W 28–7	3,606	
October 14	Cornell (IA)^{†}	Lawrence Bowl; Appleton, WI	W 34–7	4,712	
October 21	at Ripon	Ripon, WI (rivalry)	W 15–7		
October 28	Knox	Galesburg, IL	W 28–7		
November 4	Grinnell	Lawrence Bowl; Appleton, WI	W 47–0	3,936	
November 11	Monmouth (IL)	Lawrence Bowl; Appleton, WI	W 18–14	4,476	
^{†}Homecoming
