= 1967 Wiley Wildcats football team =

American college football season

1967 Wiley Wildcats football
- Conference: Southwestern Athletic Conference
- Record: 3–7 (1–6 SWAC)
- Head coach: Bob Moorman (2nd season)
- Home stadium: Wiley Field

1967 Southwestern Athletic Conference football standings
	Conf.					Overall
Team	W		L		T	W		L		T
No. 10 Grambling $	6	–	1	–	0	9	–	1	–	0
Texas Southern	5	–	2	–	0	7	–	3	–	0
Jackson State	4	–	3	–	0	6	–	3	–	0
Southern	4	–	3	–	0	5	–	5	–	0
Arkansas AM&N	3	–	4	–	0	6	–	4	–	0
Alcorn A&M	3	–	4	–	0	5	–	4	–	0
Prairie View A&M	2	–	5	–	0	5	–	5	–	0
Wiley	1	–	6	–	0	3	–	7	–	0
$ – Conference champion; Rankings from NAIA poll

The 1967 Wiley Wildcats football team represented Wiley College as a member of the Southwestern Athletic Conference (SWAC) during the 1967 NCAA College Division football season. Led by second-year head coach Bob Moorman, the Wildcats compiled an overall record of 3–7, with a conference record of 1–6, and finished eighth in the SWAC.

== Schedule ==
Date	Opponent	Site	Result	Source
September 16	Bishop*	Wiley Field; Marshall, TX	W 12–0	
September 23	at Texas Southern	Jeppesen Stadium; Houston, TX	L 13–48	
September 30	at Edward Waters*	Gator Bowl Stadium; Jacksonville, FL	W 14–13	
October 7	at Alcorn A&M	Henderson Stadium; Lorman, MS	L 0–69	
October 14	at Arkansas AM&N	Pumphrey Stadium; Pine Bluff, AR	L 3–31	
October 21	at Lincoln (MO)*	LU Stadium; Jefferson City, MO	L 19–26	
October 28	Jackson State	Wiley Field; Marshall, TX	W 20–6	
November 4	vs. Southern	State Fair Stadium; Shreveport, LA	L 3–50	
November 11	at Grambling	Grambling Stadium; Grambling, LA	L 12–70	
November 25	Prairie View A&M	Wiley Field; Marshall, TX	L 13–16	
*Non-conference game
