= 1967 Southwest Texas State Bobcats football team =

American college football season

1967 Southwest Texas State Bobcats football
- Conference: Lone Star Conference
- Record: 9–1 (6–1 LSC)
- Head coach: Bill Miller (3rd season)
- Home stadium: Evans Field

1967 Lone Star Conference football standings
	Conf.					Overall
Team	W		L		T	W		L		T
No. 4 Texas A&I $	7	–	0	–	0	9	–	0	–	0
No. 8 Southwest Texas State	6	–	1	–	0	9	–	1	–	0
Howard Payne	4	–	3	–	0	7	–	3	–	0
McMurry	4	–	3	–	0	6	–	4	–	0
East Texas State	3	–	4	–	0	4	–	6	–	0
Stephen F. Austin	3	–	4	–	0	4	–	6	–	0
Sam Houston State	1	–	6	–	0	3	–	6	–	0
Sul Ross	0	–	7	–	0	3	–	7	–	0
$ – Conference champion; Rankings from NAIA poll

The 1967 Southwest Texas State Bobcats football team was an American football team that represented Southwest Texas State College (now known as Texas State University) during the 1967 NAIA football season as a member of the Lone Star Conference (LSC). In their third year under head coach Bill Miller, the team compiled an overall record of 9–1 with a mark of 6–1 in conference play.

== Schedule ==
Date	Opponent	Rank	Site	Result	Attendance	Source
September 16	at Texas Lutheran*		Matador Field; Seguin, TX	W 30–7		
September 23	Trinity (TX)*		Evans Field; San Marcos, TX	W 23–0	7,000–8,500	
September 30	Sul Ross		Evans Field; San Marcos, TX	W 47–13	9,000	
October 7	at Angelo State*		San Angelo Stadium; San Angelo, TX	W 47–20		
October 13	at Howard Payne		Lion Stadium; Brownwood, TX	W 24–6	4,800	
October 21	Sam Houston State		Evans Field; San Marcos, TX (rivalry)	W 61–0		
October 28	McMurry		Evans Field; San Marcos, TX	W 59–0		
November 4	at Stephen F. Austin	No. 8	Memorial Stadium; Nacogdoches, TX	W 14–13	13,604	
November 11	East Texas State	No. 10	Evans Field; San Marcos, TX	W 48–26	6,500	
November 18	at No. 8 Texas A&I	No. 9	Javelina Stadium; Kingsville, TX	L 21–23		
*Non-conference game; Rankings from AP Poll released prior to the game
