= 1967 Arkansas AM&N Golden Lions football team =

American college football season

1967 Arkansas AM&N Golden Lions football
- Conference: Southwestern Athletic Conference
- Record: 6–4 (3–4 SWAC)
- Head coach: Vannette W. Johnson (6th season)
- Home stadium: Pumphrey Stadium

1967 Southwestern Athletic Conference football standings
	Conf.					Overall
Team	W		L		T	W		L		T
No. 10 Grambling $	6	–	1	–	0	9	–	1	–	0
Texas Southern	5	–	2	–	0	7	–	3	–	0
Jackson State	4	–	3	–	0	6	–	3	–	0
Southern	4	–	3	–	0	5	–	5	–	0
Arkansas AM&N	3	–	4	–	0	6	–	4	–	0
Alcorn A&M	3	–	4	–	0	5	–	4	–	0
Prairie View A&M	2	–	5	–	0	5	–	5	–	0
Wiley	1	–	6	–	0	3	–	7	–	0
$ – Conference champion; Rankings from NAIA poll

The 1967 Arkansas AM&N Golden Lions football team represented the Arkansas Agricultural, Mechanical and Normal College (now known as the University of Arkansas at Pine Bluff) as a member of the Southwestern Athletic Conference (SWAC) during the 1967 NCAA College Division football season. Led by sixth-year head coach Vannette W. Johnson, the Golden Lions compiled an overall record of 6–4, with a conference record of 3–4, and finished fifth in the SWAC.

== Schedule ==
Date	Opponent	Site	Result	Attendance	Source
September 16	at Mississippi Valley State*	Magnolia Stadium; Itta Bena, MS	W 34–0		
September 23	Lincoln (MO)*	Pumphrey Stadium; Pine Bluff, AR	W 37–0		
September 30	Jackson State	Pumphrey Stadium; Pine Bluff, AR	W 38–6	5,128	
October 7	at Southern	University Stadium; Baton Rouge, LA	L 16–21		
October 14	Wiley	Pumphrey Stadium; Pine Bluff, AR	W 31–3		
October 21	Prairie View A&M	Pumphrey Stadium; Pine Bluff, AR	W 64–7		
October 28	at Alcorn A&M	Henderson Stadium; Lorman, MS	L 8–25		
November 4	Grambling	Pumphrey Stadium; Pine Bluff, AR	L 13–39		
November 11	at Texas Southern	Jeppesen Stadium; Houston, TX	L 7–14		
November 18	at Bishop*	Bishop Stadium; Dallas, TX	W 84–6	1,500	
*Non-conference game
