= 1967 Grambling Tigers football team =

American college football season

1967 Grambling Tigers football

Black national co-champion SWAC champion

Orange Blossom Classic, W 28–25 vs. Florida A&M
- Conference: Southwestern Athletic Conference
- Record: 9–1 (6–1 SWAC)
- Head coach: Eddie Robinson (25th season)
- Home stadium: Grambling Stadium

1967 Southwestern Athletic Conference football standings
	Conf.					Overall
Team	W		L		T	W		L		T
No. 10 Grambling $	6	–	1	–	0	9	–	1	–	0
Texas Southern	5	–	2	–	0	7	–	3	–	0
Jackson State	4	–	3	–	0	6	–	3	–	0
Southern	4	–	3	–	0	5	–	5	–	0
Arkansas AM&N	3	–	4	–	0	6	–	4	–	0
Alcorn A&M	3	–	4	–	0	5	–	4	–	0
Prairie View A&M	2	–	5	–	0	5	–	5	–	0
Wiley	1	–	6	–	0	3	–	7	–	0
$ – Conference champion; Rankings from NAIA poll

The 1967 Grambling Tigers football team represented Grambling College (now known as Grambling State University) as a member of the Southwestern Athletic Conference (SWAC) during the 1967 NCAA College Division football season. In its 25th season under head coach Eddie Robinson, Grambling compiled a 9–1 record (6–1 against conference opponents), won the SWAC championship, defeated Florida A&M in the Orange Blossom Classic, and outscored opponents by a total of 318 to 145. The team is recognized as the black college football national co-champion for 1967.

== Schedule ==
Date	Opponent	Site	Result	Attendance	Source
September 16	at Alcorn A&M	Henderson Stadium; Lorman, MS	W 13–7		
September 30	Prairie View A&M	Grambling Stadium; Grambling, LA (rivalry)	W 13–10		
October 7	at Tennessee A&I*	Hale Stadium; Nashville, TN	W 26–24		
October 14	Mississippi Valley State*	Grambling Stadium; Grambling, LA	W 68–0		
October 21	at Jackson State	Mississippi Memorial Stadium; Jackson, MS	L 14–20		
October 28	Texas Southern	Grambling Stadium; Grambling, LA	W 20–14	12,000	
November 4	at Arkansas AM&N	Pumphrey Stadium; Pine Bluff, AR	W 39–13		
November 11	Wiley	Grambling Stadium; Grambling, LA	W 70–12	29,000	
November 18	Southern	Grambling Stadium; Grambling, LA (rivalry)	W 27–20	27,161	
December 2	vs. Florida A&M*	Orange Bowl; Miami, FL (Orange Blossom Classic)	W 28–25	37,681	
*Non-conference game
