= 1967 Prairie View A&M Panthers football team =

American college football season

1967 Prairie View A&M Panthers football
- Conference: Southwestern Athletic Conference
- Record: 5–5 (2–5 SWAC)
- Head coach: Hoover J. Wright (2nd season)
- Home stadium: Edward L. Blackshear Field

1967 Southwestern Athletic Conference football standings
| | Conf. | | | | | Overall |
| Team | W | | L | | T | W | | L | | T |
|---|---|---|---|---|---|---|---|---|---|---|
| No. 10 Grambling $ | 6 | – | 1 | – | 0 | 9 | – | 1 | – | 0 |
| Texas Southern | 5 | – | 2 | – | 0 | 7 | – | 3 | – | 0 |
| Jackson State | 4 | – | 3 | – | 0 | 6 | – | 3 | – | 0 |
| Southern | 4 | – | 3 | – | 0 | 5 | – | 5 | – | 0 |
| Arkansas AM&N | 3 | – | 4 | – | 0 | 6 | – | 4 | – | 0 |
| Alcorn A&M | 3 | – | 4 | – | 0 | 5 | – | 4 | – | 0 |
| Prairie View A&M | 2 | – | 5 | – | 0 | 5 | – | 5 | – | 0 |
| Wiley | 1 | – | 6 | – | 0 | 3 | – | 7 | – | 0 |
$ – Conference champion; Rankings from NAIA poll

The 1967 Prairie View A&M Panthers football team represented Prairie View A&M College of Texas (now known as Prairie View A&M University) as a member of the Southwestern Athletic Conference (SWAC) during the 1967 NCAA College Division football season. Led by second-year head coach Hoover J. Wright, the Panthers compiled an overall record of 5–5, with a conference record of 2–5, and finished seventh in the SWAC.

== Schedule ==
| Date | Opponent | Site | Result | Attendance | Source |
|---|---|---|---|---|---|
| September 16 | Jackson State | Edward L. Blackshear Field; Prairie View, TX | L 6–19 | 4,674 | |
| September 23 | Southern | Edward L. Blackshear Field; Prairie View, TX | W 20–3 | | |
| September 30 | at Grambling | Grambling Stadium; Grambling, LA | L 10–13 | | |
| October 16 | at Bishop* | Cotton Bowl; Dallas, TX (State Fair Classic) | W 12–31 | 8,000 | |
| October 21 | at Arkansas AM&N | Pumphrey Stadium; Pine Bluff, AR | L 7–64 | | |
| October 28 | at Mississippi Valley State* | Magnolia Stadium; Itta Bena, MS | W 21–14 | | |
| November 4 | Allen* | Edward L. Blackshear Field; Prairie View, TX | W 25–22 | | |
| November 11 | at Alcorn A&M | Henderson Stadium; Lorman, MS | L 21–46 | | |
| November 18 | at Texas Southern | Jeppesen Stadium; Houston, TX (rivalry) | L 3–13 | | |
| November 25 | at Wiley | Wiley Field; Marshall, TX | W 16–13 | | |
*Non-conference game
