= 1967 Alcorn A&M Braves football team =

American college football season

1967 Alcorn A&M Braves football
- Conference: Southwestern Athletic Conference
- Record: 5–4 (3–4 SWAC)
- Head coach: Marino Casem (4th season)
- Home stadium: Henderson Stadium

1967 Southwestern Athletic Conference football standings
	Conf.					Overall
Team	W		L		T	W		L		T
No. 10 Grambling $	6	–	1	–	0	9	–	1	–	0
Texas Southern	5	–	2	–	0	7	–	3	–	0
Jackson State	4	–	3	–	0	6	–	3	–	0
Southern	4	–	3	–	0	5	–	5	–	0
Arkansas AM&N	3	–	4	–	0	6	–	4	–	0
Alcorn A&M	3	–	4	–	0	5	–	4	–	0
Prairie View A&M	2	–	5	–	0	5	–	5	–	0
Wiley	1	–	6	–	0	3	–	7	–	0
$ – Conference champion; Rankings from NAIA poll

The 1967 Alcorn A&M Braves football team represented Alcorn A&M College (now known as Alcorn State University) as a member of the Southwestern Athletic Conference (SWAC) during the 1967 NCAA College Division football season. Led by fourth-year head coach Marino Casem, the Braves compiled an overall record of 5–4, with a conference record of 3–4, and finished tied for fifth in the SWAC.

== Schedule ==
Date	Opponent	Site	Result	Attendance	Source
September 9	at Paul Quinn*	Baylor Stadium; Waco, TX	W 101–0		
September 16	Grambling	Henderson Stadium; Lorman, MS	L 7–13		
September 23	at Jackson State	Mississippi Veterans Memorial Stadium; Jackson, MS (rivalry)	L 6–7	10,287	
October 7	Wiley	Henderson Stadium; Lorman, MS	W 69–0		
October 14	at Texas Southern	Jeppesen Stadium; Houston, TX	L 8–20		
October 21	at Southern	University Stadium; Baton Rouge, LA	L 7–10		
October 28	Arkansas AM&N	Henderson Stadium; Lorman, MS	W 25–8		
November 4	Mississippi Valley State*	Henderson Stadium; Lorman, MS	W 34–0		
November 11	Prairie View A&M	Henderson Stadium; Lorman, MS	W 46–21		
*Non-conference game
