= 1967 Texas Southern Tigers football team =

American college football season

1967 Texas Southern Tigers football
- Conference: Southwestern Athletic Conference
- Record: 7–3 (5–2 SWAC)
- Head coach: Clifford Paul (3rd season)
- Home stadium: Jeppesen Stadium

1967 Southwestern Athletic Conference football standings
	Conf.					Overall
Team	W		L		T	W		L		T
No. 10 Grambling $	6	–	1	–	0	9	–	1	–	0
Texas Southern	5	–	2	–	0	7	–	3	–	0
Jackson State	4	–	3	–	0	6	–	3	–	0
Southern	4	–	3	–	0	5	–	5	–	0
Arkansas AM&N	3	–	4	–	0	6	–	4	–	0
Alcorn A&M	3	–	4	–	0	5	–	4	–	0
Prairie View A&M	2	–	5	–	0	5	–	5	–	0
Wiley	1	–	6	–	0	3	–	7	–	0
$ – Conference champion; Rankings from NAIA poll

The 1967 Texas Southern Tigers football team was an American football team that represented Texas Southern University as a member of the Southwestern Athletic Conference (SWAC) during the 1967 NAIA football season. Led by third-year head coach Clifford Paul, the Tigers compiled an overall record of 7–3, with a mark of 5–2 in conference play, and finished second in the SWAC.

== Schedule ==
Date	Opponent	Site	Result	Source
September 16	at Southern	University Stadium; Baton Rouge, LA	L 17–21	
September 23	Wiley	Jeppesen Stadium; Houston, TX	W 48–13	
September 30	Tennessee A&I*	Jeppesen Stadium; Houston, TX	W 14–10	
October 7	at Mississippi Valley State*	Magnolia Stadium; Itta Bena, MS	W 64–0	
October 14	Alcorn A&M	Jeppesen Stadium; Houston, TX	W 20–8	
October 28	at Grambling	Grambling Stadium; Grambling, LA	L 14–20	
November 5	Jackson State	Jeppesen Stadium; Houston, TX	W 9–7	
November 11	Arkansas AM&N	Jeppesen Stadium; Houston, TX	W 14–7	
November 18	Prairie View A&M	Jeppesen Stadium; Houston, TX (rivalry)	W 13–3	
November 25	vs. Florida A&M*	Tampa Stadium; Tampa, FL (Golden Triangle Classic)	L 7–30	
*Non-conference game
