= 1967 Southern Jaguars football team =

American college football season

1967 Southern Jaguars football
- Conference: Southwestern Athletic Conference
- Record: 5–5 (4–3 SWAC)
- Head coach: Robert E. Smith (3rd season)
- Home stadium: University Stadium

1967 Southwestern Athletic Conference football standings
	Conf.					Overall
Team	W		L		T	W		L		T
No. 10 Grambling $	6	–	1	–	0	9	–	1	–	0
Texas Southern	5	–	2	–	0	7	–	3	–	0
Jackson State	4	–	3	–	0	6	–	3	–	0
Southern	4	–	3	–	0	5	–	5	–	0
Arkansas AM&N	3	–	4	–	0	6	–	4	–	0
Alcorn A&M	3	–	4	–	0	5	–	4	–	0
Prairie View A&M	2	–	5	–	0	5	–	5	–	0
Wiley	1	–	6	–	0	3	–	7	–	0
$ – Conference champion; Rankings from NAIA poll

The 1967 Southern Jaguars football team was an American football team that represented Southern University as a member of the Southwestern Athletic Conference (SWAC) during the 1967 NCAA College Division football season. Led by Robert E. Smith in his third season as head coach, the Jaguars compiled an overall record of 5–5, with a mark of 4–3 in conference play, and finished tied for third in the SWAC.

== Schedule ==
Date	Opponent	Site	Result	Attendance	Source
September 16	Texas Southern	University Stadium; Baton Rouge, LA	W 21–17		
September 23	at Prairie View A&M	Edward L. Blackshear Field; Prairie View, TX	L 3–20		
September 30	Mississippi Valley State*	University Stadium; Baton Rouge, LA	W 50–14		
October 7	Arkansas AM&N	University Stadium; Baton Rouge, LA	W 21–16		
October 14	at Jackson State	Alumni Field; Jackson, MS (rivalry)	L 0–3	5,438	
October 21	Alcorn A&M^{†}	University Stadium; Baton Rouge, LA	W 10–7		
October 28	Tennessee A&I*	University Stadium; Baton Rouge, LA	L 16–27		
November 4	vs. Wiley	State Fair Stadium; Shreveport, LA	W 50–3		
November 11	at Florida A&M*	Bragg Memorial Stadium; Tallahassee, FL	L 25–36		
November 18	at Grambling	Grambling Stadium; Grambling, LA	L 20–27	27,161	
*Non-conference game; ^{†}Homecoming
