= 1967 Jackson State Tigers football team =

American college football season

1967 Jackson State Tigers football
- Conference: Southwestern Athletic Conference
- Record: 6–3 (4–3 SWAC)
- Head coach: Rod Paige (4th season)
- Home stadium: Alumni Field; Mississippi Veterans Memorial Stadium

1967 Southwestern Athletic Conference football standings
| | Conf. | | | | | Overall |
| Team | W | | L | | T | W | | L | | T |
|---|---|---|---|---|---|---|---|---|---|---|
| No. 10 Grambling $ | 6 | – | 1 | – | 0 | 9 | – | 1 | – | 0 |
| Texas Southern | 5 | – | 2 | – | 0 | 7 | – | 3 | – | 0 |
| Jackson State | 4 | – | 3 | – | 0 | 6 | – | 3 | – | 0 |
| Southern | 4 | – | 3 | – | 0 | 5 | – | 5 | – | 0 |
| Arkansas AM&N | 3 | – | 4 | – | 0 | 6 | – | 4 | – | 0 |
| Alcorn A&M | 3 | – | 4 | – | 0 | 5 | – | 4 | – | 0 |
| Prairie View A&M | 2 | – | 5 | – | 0 | 5 | – | 5 | – | 0 |
| Wiley | 1 | – | 6 | – | 0 | 3 | – | 7 | – | 0 |
$ – Conference champion; Rankings from NAIA poll

The 1967 Jackson State Tigers football team represented Jackson State College (now known as Jackson State University) as a member of the Southwestern Athletic Conference (SWAC) during the 1967 NCAA College Division football season. Led by fourth-year head coach Rod Paige, the Tigers compiled an overall record of 6–3, with a conference record of 4–3, and finished tied for third in the SWAC.

== Schedule ==
| Date | Opponent | Site | Result | Attendance | Source |
|---|---|---|---|---|---|
| September 16 | at Prairie View A&M | Blackshear Field; Prairie View, TX | W 19–6 | 4,674 | |
| September 23 | Alcorn A&M | Mississippi Veterans Memorial Stadium; Jackson, MS (rivalry) | W 7–6 | 10,287 | |
| September 30 | at Arkansas AM&N | Pumphrey Stadium; Pine Bluff, AR | L 6–38 | 5,128 | |
| October 14 | Southern | Alumni Field; Jackson, MS (rivalry) | W 3–0 | 5,438 | |
| October 21 | Grambling | Mississippi Veterans Memorial Stadium; Jackson, MS | W 20–14 | 21,176 | |
| October 28 | at Wiley | Wildcat Stadium; Marshall, TX | L 6–20 | 2,001 | |
| November 5 | at Texas Southern | Jeppesen Stadium; Houston, TX | L 7–9 | 4,568 | |
| November 11 | Bishop* | Alumni Field; Jackson, MS | W 48–12 | 3,520 | |
| November 18 | at Mississippi Valley State | Magnolia Stadium; Itta Bena, MS | W 14–7 | 5,678 | |
*Non-conference game
