= 1967 NCAA College Division football season =

American college football season

- Champion(s): San Diego State (AP, UPI); Grambling (black); Morgan State (black)

The 1967 NCAA College Division football season was the 12th season of college football in the United States organized by the National Collegiate Athletic Association at the NCAA College Division level.

== Conference standings ==
1967 Big Sky Conference football standings
	Conf.					Overall
Team	W		L		T	W		L		T
Montana State $	4	–	0	–	0	7	–	3	–	0
Montana	2	–	2	–	0	7	–	3	–	0
Weber State	2	–	2	–	0	6	–	4	–	0
Idaho	2	–	2	–	0	4	–	6	–	0
Idaho State	0	–	4	–	0	1	–	9	–	0
$ – Conference champion

1967 California Collegiate Athletic Association football standings
	Conf.					Overall
Team	W		L		T	W		L		T
No. 1/1 San Diego State $	5	–	0	–	0	10	–	1	–	0
Valley State	3	–	2	–	0	6	–	4	–	0
Long Beach State	3	–	2	–	0	5	–	5	–	0
Fresno State	3	–	2	–	0	3	–	8	–	0
Cal Poly	1	–	4	–	0	3	–	7	–	0
Cal State Los Angeles	0	–	5	–	0	1	–	9	–	0
$ – Conference champion; Rankings from AP/UPI small college polls

1967 Central Intercollegiate Athletic Association football standings
	Conf.					Overall
Team	W		L		T	W		L		T
No. 9 Morgan State $	8	–	0	–	0	8	–	0	–	0
Maryland State	5	–	1	–	0	5	–	2	–	0
Johnson C. Smith	5	–	0	–	1	6	–	2	–	1
Virginia Union	5	–	3	–	0	5	–	3	–	0
North Carolina A&T	3	–	3	–	1	3	–	5	–	1
Elizabeth City State	6	–	2	–	0	7	–	2	–	0
Virginia State	4	–	3	–	1	4	–	3	–	1
Norfolk State	3	–	4	–	0	4	–	4	–	0
Delaware State	2	–	3	–	1	2	–	6	–	1
Hampton	3	–	4	–	0	3	–	5	–	0
Winston-Salem State	3	–	4	–	0	3	–	5	–	0
Howard	2	–	3	–	0	2	–	6	–	0
Livingstone	2	–	4	–	0	2	–	6	–	0
North Carolina College	1	–	5	–	1	1	–	7	–	1
Fayetteville State	1	–	4	–	1	2	–	5	–	1
Saint Paul's (VA)	1	–	5	–	1	2	–	5	–	1
Shaw	1	–	7	–	1	1	–	7	–	1
$ – Conference champion; Rankings from AP small college poll

1967 Central Intercollegiate Conference football standings
	Conf.					Overall
Team	W		L		T	W		L		T
Omaha $	4	–	0	–	0	7	–	3	–	0
Pittsburg State	3	–	1	–	0	6	–	2	–	1
Fort Hays State	2	–	2	–	0	3	–	5	–	0
Emporia State	1	–	3	–	0	1	–	9	–	0
Washburn	0	–	4	–	0	0	–	9	–	0
$ – Conference champion

1967 College Athletic Conference football standings
	Conf.					Overall
Team	W		L		T	W		L		T
Sewanee $	3	–	1	–	0	5	–	2	–	0
Centre	2	–	2	–	0	7	–	2	–	0
Washington and Lee	2	–	2	–	0	5	–	4	–	0
Washington University	2	–	2	–	0	5	–	4	–	1
Southwestern (TN)	1	–	3	–	0	3	–	4	–	0
$ – Conference champion

1967 College Conference of Illinois and Wisconsin football standings
	Conf.					Overall
Team	W		L		T	W		L		T
Carthage $	6	–	0	–	0	7	–	1	–	0
Illinois Wesleyan	5	–	1	–	0	7	–	2	–	0
Carroll (WI)	4	–	2	–	0	5	–	3	–	0
Augustana (IL)	3	–	3	–	0	4	–	5	–	0
North Park	1	–	5	–	0	3	–	6	–	0
North Central (IL)	1	–	5	–	0	2	–	7	–	0
Millikin	1	–	5	–	0	1	–	8	–	0
$ – Conference champion

1967 Eastern Football Conference football standings
	Conf.					Overall
Team	W		L		T	W		L		T
Central Connecticut State +	4	–	1	–	0	7	–	1	–	0
Southern Connecticut State +	4	–	1	–	0	6	–	3	–	0
Bridgeport	2	–	2	–	0	2	–	6	–	0
Montclair State	2	–	3	–	0	4	–	5	–	0
Glassboro State	1	–	3	–	0	3	–	5	–	0
Trenton State	1	–	4	–	0	2	–	6	–	0
+ – Conference co-champions

1967 Far Western Conference football standings
	Conf.					Overall
Team	W		L		T	W		L		T
No. 17 San Francisco State $	6	–	0	–	0	9	–	2	–	0
Sacramento State	4	–	2	–	0	7	–	3	–	0
Humboldt State	3	–	2	–	1	6	–	3	–	1
Cal State Hayward	3	–	3	–	0	7	–	3	–	0
Nevada	2	–	3	–	1	4	–	4	–	1
UC Davis	2	–	4	–	0	3	–	6	–	0
Chico State	0	–	6	–	0	2	–	8	–	0
$ – Conference champion; Rankings from UPI small college poll

1967 Gulf States Conference football standings
	Conf.					Overall
Team	W		L		T	W		L		T
McNeese State $	4	–	1	–	0	4	–	5	–	0
Southwestern Louisiana	3	–	2	–	0	6	–	4	–	0
Northeast Louisiana State	3	–	2	–	0	7	–	3	–	0
Northwestern State	3	–	2	–	0	6	–	3	–	0
Southeastern Louisiana	2	–	3	–	0	4	–	5	–	0
Louisiana Tech	0	–	5	–	0	3	–	7	–	0
$ – Conference champion

1967 Hoosier Conference football standings
	Conf.					Overall
Team	W		L		T	W		L		T
Taylor $	5	–	1	–	0	7	–	2	–	0
Franklin (IN)	4	–	2	–	0	6	–	3	–	0
Hanover	3	–	2	–	1	4	–	4	–	1
Manchester (IN)	3	–	3	–	0	3	–	5	–	0
Earlham	2	–	2	–	1	3	–	3	–	1
Anderson (IN)	1	–	4	–	0	1	–	7	–	0
Indiana Central	1	–	5	–	0	1	–	7	–	1
$ – Conference champion

1967 Independent College Athletic Conference football standings
	Conf.					Overall
Team	W		L		T	W		L		T
Alfred $	3	–	0	–	0	6	–	1	–	0
Union (NY)	3	–	1	–	0	4	–	4	–	0
RPI	1	–	1	–	0	4	–	4	–	0
St. Lawrence	0	–	2	–	1	1	–	6	–	1
Hobart	0	–	3	–	1	0	–	7	–	1
$ – Conference champion

1967 Indiana Collegiate Conference football standings
	Conf.					Overall
Team	W		L		T	W		L		T
Ball State $^	5	–	1	–	0	7	–	3	–	0
DePauw	4	–	1	–	1	6	–	2	–	1
Indiana State	4	–	2	–	0	5	–	4	–	0
Saint Joseph's (IN)	3	–	3	–	0	3	–	6	–	0
Evansville	2	–	3	–	1	2	–	5	–	2
Valparaiso	1	–	5	–	0	3	–	6	–	0
Butler	1	–	5	–	0	2	–	7	–	0
$ – Conference champion; ^ – Grantland Rice Bowl participant

1967 Interstate Intercollegiate Athletic Conference football standings
	Conf.					Overall
Team	W		L		T	W		L		T
Central Michigan +	2	–	1	–	0	8	–	2	–	0
Illinois State +	2	–	1	–	0	8	–	2	–	0
Eastern Illinois	1	–	2	–	0	2	–	6	–	1
Western Illinois	1	–	2	–	0	2	–	6	–	0
+ – Conference co-champions

1967 Iowa Conference football standings
	Conf.					Overall
Team	W		L		T	W		L		T
No. 11 Central (IA) $	7	–	0	–	0	9	–	0	–	0
Simpson (IA)	6	–	1	–	0	7	–	1	–	1
Luther	4	–	2	–	1	4	–	4	–	1
William Penn	3	–	4	–	0	4	–	5	–	0
Upper Iowa	2	–	4	–	1	3	–	5	–	1
Buena Vista	2	–	5	–	0	2	–	6	–	0
Dubuque	1	–	4	–	2	1	–	6	–	2
Wartburg	1	–	6	–	0	1	–	8	–	0
$ – Conference champion; Rankings from NAIA poll

1967 Little Three Conference football standings
	Conf.					Overall
Team	W		L		T	W		L		T
Williams $	2	–	0	–	0	7	–	0	–	1
Amherst	1	–	1	–	0	3	–	4	–	1
Wesleyan	0	–	2	–	0	4	–	4	–	0
$ – Conference champion

1967 Maine Intercollegiate Athletic Association football standings
	Conf.					Overall
Team	W		L		T	W		L		T
Bates $	2	–	0	–	0	5	–	3	–	0
Bowdoin	1	–	1	–	0	2	–	5	–	0
Colby	0	–	2	–	0	2	–	6	–	0
$ – Conference champion

1967 Mason–Dixon Conference football standings
	Conf.					Overall
Team	W		L		T	W		L		T
Randolph–Macon $	5	–	1	–	0	7	–	2	–	0
Hampden–Sydney	3	–	1	–	0	5	–	5	–	0
Western Maryland	3	–	2	–	0	6	–	3	–	0
Johns Hopkins	1	–	1	–	0	6	–	1	–	0
Gallaudet	1	–	2	–	0	2	–	6	–	0
Shepherd	1	–	4	–	0	3	–	5	–	0
Bridgewater	1	–	4	–	0	2	–	6	–	0
$ – Conference champion

1967 Michigan Intercollegiate Athletic Association football standings
	Conf.					Overall
Team	W		L		T	W		L		T
No. 20 Alma $	5	–	0	–	0	8	–	0	–	0
Olivet	4	–	1	–	0	8	–	1	–	0
Albion	2	–	2	–	0	2	–	5	–	1
Hope	1	–	3	–	0	2	–	6	–	0
Kalamazoo	1	–	4	–	0	2	–	6	–	0
Adrian	1	–	4	–	0	1	–	7	–	0
$ – Conference champion; Rankings from NAIA poll

1967 Middle Atlantic Conference football standings
	Conf.					Overall
Team	W		L		T	W		L		T
University Division
Temple x	4	–	0	–	0	7	–	2	–	0
Hofstra	3	–	1	–	0	8	–	2	–	0
Bucknell	3	–	2	–	0	4	–	6	–	0
Gettysburg	2	–	3	–	0	4	–	5	–	0
Delaware	2	–	3	–	0	2	–	7	–	0
Lafayette	2	–	3	–	0	4	–	5	–	0
Lehigh	0	–	4	–	0	1	–	8	–	0
West Chester *	0	–	0	–	0	9	–	0	–	0
Northern College Division
Wilkes x	8	–	0	–	0	8	–	0	–	0
Wagner x	5	–	0	–	0	9	–	0	–	0
Juniata x	5	–	0	–	0	7	–	1	–	0
Delaware Valley	5	–	2	–	0	6	–	2	–	0
Albright	4	–	3	–	0	5	–	4	–	0
Upsala	4	–	4	–	0	4	–	4	–	0
Lycoming	3	–	5	–	0	3	–	5	–	0
Moravian	3	–	6	–	0	3	–	6	–	0
Susquehanna *	0	–	3	–	0	1	–	8	–	0
Southern College Division
Johns Hopkins x	6	–	0	–	0	6	–	1	–	0
Western Maryland	3	–	2	–	0	6	–	3	–	0
Franklin & Marshall	4	–	3	–	0	4	–	4	–	0
Swarthmore	3	–	5	–	0	3	–	5	–	0
Lebanon Valley	3	–	5	–	0	3	–	5	–	0
Dickinson	3	–	5	–	0	3	–	5	–	0
Pennsylvania Military	3	–	5	–	0	3	–	6	–	0
Haverford	2	–	4	–	0	2	–	5	–	0
Muhlenberg	2	–	5	–	1	2	–	5	–	1
Ursinus	1	–	6	–	1	1	–	6	–	1
Drexel	1	–	5	–	0	3	–	5	–	0
x – Division champion/co-champions; * – Ineligible for championship due to insufficient conference games

1967 Midwest Conference football standings
	Conf.					Overall
Team	W		L		T	W		L		T
Lawrence $	8	–	0	–	0	8	–	0	–	0
St. Olaf	6	–	2	–	0	6	–	2	–	0
Monmouth (IL)	5	–	3	–	0	5	–	3	–	0
Beloit	4	–	4	–	0	4	–	4	–	0
Coe	4	–	4	–	0	4	–	4	–	0
Cornell (IA)	4	–	4	–	0	4	–	4	–	0
Ripon	4	–	4	–	0	4	–	4	–	0
Carleton	2	–	5	–	1	2	–	5	–	1
Grinnell	2	–	6	–	0	2	–	6	–	0
Knox	0	–	7	–	1	0	–	7	–	1
$ – Conference champion

1967 Minnesota Intercollegiate Athletic Conference football standings
	Conf.					Overall
Team	W		L		T	W		L		T
Gustavus Adolphus $	6	–	1	–	0	6	–	3	–	0
Concordia (MN)	5	–	1	–	1	7	–	1	–	1
Minnesota–Duluth	5	–	1	–	1	7	–	1	–	1
St. Thomas (MN)	4	–	3	–	0	6	–	3	–	0
Saint John's (MN)	3	–	4	–	0	3	–	5	–	0
Hamline	2	–	5	–	0	4	–	5	–	0
Macalester	2	–	5	–	0	3	–	6	–	0
Augsburg	0	–	7	–	0	1	–	8	–	0
$ – Conference champion

1967 Missouri Intercollegiate Athletic Association football standings
	Conf.					Overall
Team	W		L		T	W		L		T
SE Missouri State $	5	–	0	–	0	8	–	2	–	0
Central Missouri State	4	–	1	–	0	6	–	4	–	0
NE Missouri State	2	–	3	–	0	4	–	5	–	0
SW Missouri State	2	–	3	–	0	4	–	6	–	0
NW Missouri State	2	–	3	–	0	3	–	6	–	0
Missouri–Rolla	0	–	5	–	0	2	–	7	–	0
$ – Conference champion

1967 North Central Conference football standings
	Conf.					Overall
Team	W		L		T	W		L		T
North Dakota State $	6	–	0	–	0	9	–	1	–	0
State College of Iowa	5	–	1	–	0	7	–	3	–	0
North Dakota	4	–	2	–	0	4	–	6	–	0
Augustana (SD)	2	–	4	–	0	4	–	5	–	0
Morningside	2	–	4	–	0	4	–	5	–	0
South Dakota State	2	–	4	–	0	4	–	6	–	0
South Dakota	0	–	6	–	0	2	–	8	–	0
$ – Conference champion

1967 Northern Intercollegiate Conference football standings
	Conf.					Overall
Team	W		L		T	W		L		T
St. Cloud State $	5	–	0	–	0	8	–	1	–	0
Winona State	4	–	1	–	0	6	–	3	–	0
Mankato State	3	–	2	–	0	5	–	4	–	0
Bemidji State	1	–	3	–	1	3	–	5	–	1
Moorhead State	1	–	3	–	1	2	–	5	–	1
Michigan Tech	0	–	5	–	0	0	–	7	–	1
$ – Conference champion

1967 Ohio Athletic Conference football standings
	Conf.					Overall
Team	W		L		T	W		L		T
Ohio Wesleyan $	6	–	0	–	0	8	–	0	–	1
Muskingum	5	–	1	–	0	8	–	1	–	0
Wooster	5	–	1	–	0	6	–	3	–	0
Marietta	4	–	1	–	1	4	–	4	–	1
Wittenberg	3	–	1	–	0	8	–	1	–	0
Capital	5	–	2	–	0	5	–	3	–	0
Denison	4	–	3	–	0	6	–	3	–	0
Heidelberg	2	–	4	–	0	4	–	4	–	1
Baldwin–Wallace	1	–	2	–	0	5	–	3	–	1
Mount Union	2	–	5	–	1	2	–	6	–	1
Hiram	2	–	5	–	0	3	–	5	–	0
Otterbein	1	–	5	–	0	2	–	7	–	0
Oberlin	1	–	5	–	0	1	–	7	–	0
Kenyon	0	–	6	–	0	0	–	8	–	0
$ – Conference champion

1967 Ohio Valley Conference football standings
	Conf.					Overall
Team	W		L		T	W		L		T
No. 5/11 Eastern Kentucky $	5	–	0	–	2	7	–	1	–	2
Western Kentucky	5	–	1	–	1	7	–	1	–	1
Middle Tennessee	4	–	3	–	0	5	–	5	–	0
East Tennessee State	3	–	4	–	0	3	–	6	–	1
Tennessee Tech	3	–	4	–	0	3	–	7	–	0
Morehead State	2	–	4	–	1	4	–	5	–	1
Murray State	2	–	5	–	0	4	–	6	–	0
Austin Peay	2	–	5	–	0	2	–	8	–	0
$ – Conference champion; Rankings from AP/UPI small college polls

1967 Pennsylvania State College Athletic Conference football standings
	Conf.					Overall
Team	W		L		T	W		L		T
East Division
West Chester xy$	6	–	0	–	0	10	–	1	–	0
East Stroudsburg	5	–	1	–	0	7	–	1	–	0
Bloomsburg	3	–	3	–	0	6	–	3	–	0
Mansfield	3	–	3	–	0	6	–	3	–	0
Millersville	2	–	4	–	0	3	–	6	–	0
Cheyney	1	–	5	–	0	3	–	5	–	0
Kutztown	1	–	5	–	0	1	–	7	–	0
West Division
Clarion xy	5	–	0	–	0	8	–	2	–	0
California (PA)	3	–	2	–	0	5	–	3	–	0
Shippensburg	3	–	2	–	0	3	–	5	–	0
Lock Haven	3	–	2	–	0	2	–	7	–	0
Edinboro	1	–	4	–	0	2	–	7	–	0
Slippery Rock	0	–	5	–	0	2	–	7	–	0
Championship: West Chester 27, Clarion 7
$ – Conference champion; x – Division champion/co-champions; y – Championship game participant

1967 Prairie College Conference football standings
	Conf.					Overall
Team	W		L		T	W		L		T
Principia $	2	–	0	–	0	4	–	3	–	1
Rose Poly	0	–	1	–	1	1	–	6	–	2
Illinois College	0	–	1	–	1	1	–	6	–	1
$ – Conference champion

1967 Presidents' Athletic Conference football standings
	Conf.					Overall
Team	W		L		T	W		L		T
Thiel $	5	–	0	–	0	7	–	1	–	0
Bethany (WV)	4	–	2	–	0	5	–	3	–	0
Allegheny	3	–	2	–	0	5	–	2	–	0
John Carroll	3	–	2	–	0	3	–	4	–	0
Western Reserve	2	–	3	–	0	2	–	5	–	0
Washington & Jefferson	1	–	4	–	0	1	–	6	–	0
Case Tech	0	–	5	–	0	0	–	7	–	0
$ – Conference champion

1967 Rocky Mountain Conference football standings
	Conf.					Overall
Team	W		L		T	W		L		T
Adams State $	3	–	0	–	0	8	–	1	–	0
Colorado State–Greeley	2	–	1	–	0	6	–	2	–	1
Western State (CO)	1	–	2	–	0	4	–	5	–	0
Colorado Mines	0	–	3	–	0	1	–	7	–	1
$ – Conference champion

1967 Southern California Intercollegiate Athletic Conference football standings
	Conf.					Overall
Team	W		L		T	W		L		T
Whittier $	4	–	1	–	0	4	–	5	–	0
Occidental	3	–	2	–	0	5	–	4	–	0
Redlands	3	–	2	–	0	5	–	5	–	0
Pomona	3	–	2	–	0	3	–	6	–	0
Claremont-Mudd	2	–	3	–	0	2	–	7	–	0
Caltech	0	–	5	–	0	0	–	8	–	0
$ – Conference champion; Caltech forfeited to Whittier and Redlands; the forfeits were included only in conference records.

1967 Southland Conference football standings
	Conf.					Overall
Team	W		L		T	W		L		T
No. 6 UT Arlington $	4	–	0	–	0	10	–	1	–	0
Lamar Tech	3	–	1	–	0	7	–	3	–	0
Arkansas State	2	–	2	–	0	4	–	5	–	0
Trinity (TX)	1	–	3	–	0	3	–	7	–	0
Abilene Christian	0	–	4	–	0	3	–	6	–	0
$ – Conference champion; Rankings from AP small college poll

1967 Southwestern Athletic Conference football standings
	Conf.					Overall
Team	W		L		T	W		L		T
No. 10 Grambling $	6	–	1	–	0	9	–	1	–	0
Texas Southern	5	–	2	–	0	7	–	3	–	0
Jackson State	4	–	3	–	0	6	–	3	–	0
Southern	4	–	3	–	0	5	–	5	–	0
Arkansas AM&N	3	–	4	–	0	6	–	4	–	0
Alcorn A&M	3	–	4	–	0	5	–	4	–	0
Prairie View A&M	2	–	5	–	0	5	–	5	–	0
Wiley	1	–	6	–	0	3	–	7	–	0
$ – Conference champion; Rankings from NAIA poll

1967 Yankee Conference football standings
	Conf.					Overall
Team	W		L		T	W		L		T
UMass $	5	–	0	–	0	7	–	2	–	0
Connecticut	4	–	1	–	0	5	–	4	–	0
Rhode Island	2	–	2	–	1	6	–	2	–	1
New Hampshire	2	–	3	–	0	5	–	3	–	0
Vermont	1	–	3	–	1	3	–	5	–	1
Maine	0	–	5	–	0	0	–	8	–	0
$ – Conference champion

1967 NCAA College Division independents football records
	Conf.			Overall
Team	W	L	T	W		L		T
Ashland		–		8	–	0	–	1
Northern Michigan		–		9	–	1	–	0
Indiana (PA)		–		8	–	1	–	0
Santa Clara		–		8	–	1	–	0
Northeastern		–		7	–	1	–	0
Samford		–		8	–	2	–	1
Wayne State (MI)		–		6	–	2	–	0
Chattanooga		–		7	–	3	–	0
Eastern Michigan		–		6	–	3	–	0
Tennessee A&I		–		6	–	3	–	0
Parsons		–		6	–	3	–	1
Kentucky State		–		5	–	3	–	1
Hawaii		–		6	–	4	–	0
St. Norbert		–		5	–	4	–	0
Akron		–		4	–	4	–	1
Carnegie Mellon		–		4	–	4	–	0
Cortland		–		4	–	4	–	0
Northern Arizona		–		5	–	5	–	0
Northern Illinois		–		5	–	5	–	0
UC Riverside		–		4	–	4	–	1
UC Santa Barbara		–		5	–	5	–	0
Drake		–		4	–	5	–	0
Pacific (CA)		–		4	–	5	–	0
Portland State		–		4	–	6	–	0
Lincoln (MO)		–		3	–	5	–	0
Boston University		–		3	–	6	–	0
Lake Forest		–		3	–	6	–	0
Milwaukee		–		3	–	6	–	0
Mississippi Valley State		–		3	–	6	–	0
Southern Illinois		–		3	–	7	–	0
Colorado College		–		2	–	5	–	1
Rose Poly		–		1	–	6	–	2
Tampa		–		2	–	7	–	0
Wabash		–		2	–	7	–	0
Cal Poly Pomona		–		2	–	8	–	0

== Rankings ==
College Division teams (also referred to as "small college") were ranked in polls by the AP (a panel of writers) and by UPI (coaches). The national champion(s) for each season were determined by the final poll rankings, published at or near the end of the regular season, before any bowl games were played.

=== Small college final polls ===
In 1967, both services ranked San Diego State first and North Dakota State second. San Diego State later defeated San Francisco State 34–6 in the Camellia Bowl, while North Dakota State later lost to Texas–Arlington in the Pecan Bowl, 13–0.

Associated Press (writers) final poll
Published on November 24

Rank	School	Record	No. 1 votes	Total points
1	San Diego State	9–0†	12	157
2	North Dakota State	9–0	2	137
3	New Mexico Highlands	9–0†	1	93
4	Texas A&I	9–0	1	76
5	Eastern Kentucky	7–1–2		75
6	Texas–Arlington	9–1		70
7	Waynesburg	8–1		54
8	Northern Michigan	9–0†		53
9	Morgan State	8–0		34
10	Southwest Texas State	8–1		21

†Denotes team lost a game after AP poll, hence record differs in UPI poll

United Press International (coaches) final poll
Published on November 30

Rank	School	Record	No. 1 votes	Total points
1	San Diego State	9–1	17	317
2	North Dakota State	9–0	14	299
3	Texas–Arlington	9–1	2	205
4	Fairmont State	10–0	1	194
5	West Chester	9–0	1	132
6	Eastern Washington	11–0	1	121
7	Texas A&I	9–0		106
8	New Mexico Highlands	9–1		84
9	Northern Michigan	9–1		69
10	Waynesburg	8–1		65

== Bowl games ==
The postseason consisted of four bowl games as regional finals; Mideast and West played on December 9, while East and Midwest played on December 16.

Bowl	Region	Location	Winning team		Losing team		Ref
Tangerine	East	Orlando, Florida	Tennessee–Martin	25	West Chester	8	
Grantland Rice	Mideast	Murfreesboro, Tennessee	Eastern Kentucky	27	Ball State	13	
Pecan	Midwest	Abilene, Texas	Texas–Arlington	13	North Dakota State	0	
Camellia	West	Sacramento, California	San Diego State	34	San Francisco State	6	

In 1968, the Boardwalk Bowl succeeded the Tangerine Bowl, and the Pecan Bowl moved within Texas, from Abilene to Arlington.

== See also ==
- 1967 NCAA University Division football season
- 1967 NAIA football season
