= 1967 Drake Bulldogs football team =

American college football season

1967 Drake Bulldogs football
- Conference: Independent
- Record: 4–5
- Head coach: Jack Wallace (3rd season)
- Home stadium: Drake Stadium

1967 NCAA College Division independents football records
	Conf.			Overall
Team	W	L	T	W		L		T
Ashland		–		8	–	0	–	1
Northern Michigan		–		9	–	1	–	0
Indiana (PA)		–		8	–	1	–	0
Santa Clara		–		8	–	1	–	0
Northeastern		–		7	–	1	–	0
Wheaton (IL)		–		7	–	2	–	0
Samford		–		8	–	2	–	1
Wayne State (MI)		–		6	–	2	–	0
Chattanooga		–		7	–	3	–	0
Eastern Michigan		–		6	–	3	–	0
Tennessee A&I		–		6	–	3	–	0
Parsons		–		6	–	3	–	1
Kentucky State		–		5	–	3	–	1
Hawaii		–		6	–	4	–	0
St. Norbert		–		5	–	4	–	0
Akron		–		4	–	4	–	1
Carnegie Mellon		–		4	–	4	–	0
Cortland		–		4	–	4	–	0
Northern Arizona		–		5	–	5	–	0
Northern Illinois		–		5	–	5	–	0
UC Riverside		–		4	–	4	–	1
UC Santa Barbara		–		5	–	5	–	0
Drake		–		4	–	5	–	0
Pacific (CA)		–		4	–	5	–	0
Portland State		–		4	–	6	–	0
Lincoln (MO)		–		3	–	5	–	0
Boston University		–		3	–	6	–	0
Lake Forest		–		3	–	6	–	0
Milwaukee		–		3	–	6	–	0
Southern Illinois		–		3	–	7	–	0
Colorado College		–		2	–	5	–	1
Rose Poly		–		1	–	6	–	2
Tampa		–		2	–	7	–	0
Wabash		–		2	–	7	–	0
Cal Poly Pomona		–		2	–	8	–	0
Mississippi Valley State		–		1	–	8	–	0

The 1967 Drake Bulldogs football team was an American football team that represented Drake University as an independent during the 1967 NCAA College Division football season. In its third season under head coach Jack Wallace, the team compiled a 4–5 record and was outscored by a total of 248 to 139.

The team's statistical leaders included sophomore quarterback Gary McCoy (674 passing yards), junior halfback Bob Misner (373 rushing yards, 42 points scored), and junior end Dick Ewins (386 receiving yards).

The team played its home games at Drake Stadium in Des Moines, Iowa.

== Schedule ==
Date	Opponent	Site	Result	Attendance	Source
September 16	Louisville	Drake Stadium; Des Moines, IA	L 7–46	6,500	
September 23	at North Texas State	Fouts Field; Denton, TX	L 0–31	12,600	
September 30	at Wichita State	Veterans Field; Wichita, KS	L 13–46	12,220	
October 7	at Northwest Missouri State	Bearcat Stadium; Maryville, MO	W 7–0	750	
October 14	State College of Iowa	Drake Stadium; Des Moines, IA	W 10–7	10,000	
October 21	Omaha	Drake Stadium; Des Moines, IA	W 23–15	7,200	
November 4	at South Dakota State	Drake Stadium; Des Moines, IA	W 34–21	600	
November 11	South Dakota	Drake Stadium; Des Moines, IA	L 35–37	6,500	
November 18	at Southern Illinois	McAndrew Stadium; Carbondale, IL	L 17–45	6,000	
