= 1967 Milwaukee Panthers football team =

American college football season

1967 Milwaukee Panthers football
- Conference: Independent
- Record: 3–6
- Head coach: Wally Dreyer (8th season)
- Home stadium: Shorewood Stadium; Pearse Field

1967 NCAA College Division independents football records
	Conf.			Overall
Team	W	L	T	W		L		T
Ashland		–		8	–	0	–	1
Northern Michigan		–		9	–	1	–	0
Indiana (PA)		–		8	–	1	–	0
Santa Clara		–		8	–	1	–	0
Northeastern		–		7	–	1	–	0
Wheaton (IL)		–		7	–	2	–	0
Samford		–		8	–	2	–	1
Wayne State (MI)		–		6	–	2	–	0
Chattanooga		–		7	–	3	–	0
Eastern Michigan		–		6	–	3	–	0
Tennessee A&I		–		6	–	3	–	0
Parsons		–		6	–	3	–	1
Kentucky State		–		5	–	3	–	1
Hawaii		–		6	–	4	–	0
St. Norbert		–		5	–	4	–	0
Akron		–		4	–	4	–	1
Carnegie Mellon		–		4	–	4	–	0
Cortland		–		4	–	4	–	0
Northern Arizona		–		5	–	5	–	0
Northern Illinois		–		5	–	5	–	0
UC Riverside		–		4	–	4	–	1
UC Santa Barbara		–		5	–	5	–	0
Drake		–		4	–	5	–	0
Pacific (CA)		–		4	–	5	–	0
Portland State		–		4	–	6	–	0
Lincoln (MO)		–		3	–	5	–	0
Boston University		–		3	–	6	–	0
Lake Forest		–		3	–	6	–	0
Milwaukee		–		3	–	6	–	0
Southern Illinois		–		3	–	7	–	0
Colorado College		–		2	–	5	–	1
Rose Poly		–		1	–	6	–	2
Tampa		–		2	–	7	–	0
Wabash		–		2	–	7	–	0
Cal Poly Pomona		–		2	–	8	–	0
Mississippi Valley State		–		1	–	8	–	0

The 1967 Milwaukee Panthers football team represented the University of Wisconsin–Milwaukee as an independent during the 1967 NCAA College Division football season. Led by Wally Dreyer in his eighth season as head coach, Milwaukee compiled a record of 3–6. The Panthers offense scored 155 points while the defense allowed 251 points.

== Schedule ==
Date	Opponent	Site	Result	Attendance	Source
September 16	at Illinois State	Hancock Stadium; Normal, IL	L 0–21	6,000	
September 23	Eastern Illinois	Shorewood Stadium; Shorewood, WI	W 30–6	5,000	
September 30	Wayne State (MI)	Pearse Field; Milwaukee, WI	L 31–39	5,000	
October 7	at No. 3 North Dakota State	Dacotah Field; Fargo, ND	L 0–71	8,000	
October 21	at Chicago Circle	Soldier Field; Chicago, IL	L 6–20	8,026	
October 28	Ferris State	Shorewood Stadium; Shorewood, WI	W 32–14	4,000	
November 4	at St. Norbert	Minahan Stadium; De Pere, WI	L 6–25	1,800	
November 11	Bradley	Shorewood Stadium; Shorewood, WI	W 21–18	4,645	
November 18	Wittenberg	Shorewood Stadium; Shorewood, WI	L 29–37	2,036	
Rankings from AP Poll released prior to the game; Source:
