= 1967 Mississippi Valley State Delta Devils football team =

American college football season

1967 Mississippi Valley State Delta Devils football
- Conference: Independent
- Record: 1–8
- Head coach: Curtis Maddox (2nd season)
- Home stadium: Magnolia Stadium

1967 NCAA College Division independents football records
	Conf.			Overall
Team	W	L	T	W		L		T
Ashland		–		8	–	0	–	1
Northern Michigan		–		9	–	1	–	0
Indiana (PA)		–		8	–	1	–	0
Santa Clara		–		8	–	1	–	0
Northeastern		–		7	–	1	–	0
Wheaton (IL)		–		7	–	2	–	0
Samford		–		8	–	2	–	1
Wayne State (MI)		–		6	–	2	–	0
Chattanooga		–		7	–	3	–	0
Eastern Michigan		–		6	–	3	–	0
Tennessee A&I		–		6	–	3	–	0
Parsons		–		6	–	3	–	1
Kentucky State		–		5	–	3	–	1
Hawaii		–		6	–	4	–	0
St. Norbert		–		5	–	4	–	0
Akron		–		4	–	4	–	1
Carnegie Mellon		–		4	–	4	–	0
Cortland		–		4	–	4	–	0
Northern Arizona		–		5	–	5	–	0
Northern Illinois		–		5	–	5	–	0
UC Riverside		–		4	–	4	–	1
UC Santa Barbara		–		5	–	5	–	0
Drake		–		4	–	5	–	0
Pacific (CA)		–		4	–	5	–	0
Portland State		–		4	–	6	–	0
Lincoln (MO)		–		3	–	5	–	0
Boston University		–		3	–	6	–	0
Lake Forest		–		3	–	6	–	0
Milwaukee		–		3	–	6	–	0
Mississippi Valley State		–		3	–	6	–	0
Southern Illinois		–		3	–	7	–	0
Colorado College		–		2	–	5	–	1
Rose Poly		–		1	–	6	–	2
Tampa		–		2	–	7	–	0
Wabash		–		2	–	7	–	0
Cal Poly Pomona		–		2	–	8	–	0

The 1967 Mississippi Valley State Delta Devils football team represented Mississippi Valley State College (now known as Mississippi Valley State University) as an independent school during the 1967 NCAA College Division football season. Led by second-year head coach Curtis Maddox, the Delta Devils compiled an overall record of 1–8.

== Schedule ==
Date	Opponent	Site	Result	Attendance	Source
September 16	Arkansas AM&N	Magnolia Stadium; Itta Bena, MS	L 0–34		
September 23	at Paul Quinn	Waco, TX	W 36–6		
September 30	at Southern	University Stadium; Baton Rouge, LA	L 14–50		
October 7	Texas Southern	Magnolia Stadium; Itta Bena, MS	L 0–64		
October 14	at Grambling	Grambling Stadium; Grambling, LA	L 0–68		
October 21	at Edward Waters	Sun Valley Stadium; Jacksonville, FL	L 6–27		
October 28	Prairie View A&M	Magnolia Stadium; Itta Bena, MS	L 14–21		
November 4	at Alcorn A&M	Henderson Stadium; Lorman, MS	L 0–34		
November 18	Jackson State	Magnolia Stadium; Itta Bena, MS	L 7–14	5,678	
