= 1965 Eastern Michigan Hurons football team =

American college football season

1965 Eastern Michigan Hurons football
- Conference: Presidents' Athletic Conference
- Record: 3–4–1 (3–1–1 PAC)
- Head coach: Jerry Raymond (1st season)
- Captains: Jim Hadley; Hildred Lewis
- Home stadium: Briggs Field

1965 Presidents' Athletic Conference football standings
	Conf.					Overall
Team	W		L		T	W		L		T
Bethany (WV) $	5	–	1	–	0	5	–	3	–	0
John Carroll	5	–	1	–	1	5	–	1	–	1
Eastern Michigan	3	–	1	–	1	3	–	4	–	1
Wayne State (MI)	3	–	2	–	1	3	–	4	–	1
Western Reserve	3	–	4	–	1	3	–	4	–	1
Washington & Jefferson	2	–	4	–	0	4	–	4	–	0
Allegheny	2	–	4	–	0	3	–	5	–	0
Case Tech	2	–	5	–	0	3	–	5	–	0
Thiel	2	–	5	–	0	3	–	5	–	0
$ – Conference champion

The 1965 Eastern Michigan Hurons football team represented Eastern Michigan University in the Presidents' Athletic Conference (PAC) during the 1965 NCAA College Division football season. In their first season under head coach Jerry Raymond, the Hurons compiled a 3–4–1 record (3–1–1 against PAC opponents) and were outscored by their opponents, 129 to 125.

In the middle of August 1965, Fred Trosko, who had been the head football coach since 1952, abruptly quit. Jerry Raymond, an Eastern Michigan alumnus who had been the school's freshman football coach, was named as Trosko's replacement.

== Schedule ==
Date	Opponent	Site	Result	Attendance
September 25	Western Illinois*	Briggs Field; Ypsilanti, MI	L 7–44	5,000
October 1	Ohio Northern*	Briggs Field; Ypsilanti, MI	L 0–7	4,200
October 8	John Carroll	Briggs Field; Ypsilanti, MI	L 6–7	2,500
October 16	at Allegheny	Meadville, PA	W 23–8	4,000
October 23	Wayne State (MI)^{†}	Briggs Field; Ypsilanti, MI	W 20–0	7,200
October 30	at Western Reserve	Clarke Field; Cleveland, OH	T 14–14	
November 6	Case Tech	Briggs Field; Ypsilanti, MI	W 41–20	
November 13	at Baldwin–Wallace*	Berea, OH	L 14–29	
*Non-conference game; ^{†}Homecoming
