= Wayne Williamson =

American football player and coach (born 1938)

Biographical details
- Born: January 27, 1938; Luverne, Alabama, U.S.
- Died: June 7, 2021

Playing career
- 1957–1959: Florida
- Position: Quarterback

Coaching career (HC unless noted)
- 1968–1969: Parsons

Administrative career (AD unless noted)
- 1968–1970: Parsons
- 1970–1999: Hillsborough HS (FL)

Head coaching record
- Overall: 7–12

Kendrick Wayne Williamson (born January 27, 1938) is an American former football player and coach. He served as the head football coach at Parsons College from 1968 to 1969, compiling a record of 7–12.
