= 1967 Eastern Michigan Hurons football team =

American college football season

1967 Eastern Michigan Hurons football
- Conference: Independent
- Record: 6–3
- Head coach: Dan Boisture (1st season)
- Captains: Ron Arnold; Bob Edelbrock
- Home stadium: Briggs Field

1967 NCAA College Division independents football records
	Conf.			Overall
Team	W	L	T	W		L		T
Ashland		–		8	–	0	–	1
Northern Michigan		–		9	–	1	–	0
Indiana (PA)		–		8	–	1	–	0
Santa Clara		–		8	–	1	–	0
Northeastern		–		7	–	1	–	0
Wheaton (IL)		–		7	–	2	–	0
Samford		–		8	–	2	–	1
Wayne State (MI)		–		6	–	2	–	0
Chattanooga		–		7	–	3	–	0
Eastern Michigan		–		6	–	3	–	0
Tennessee A&I		–		6	–	3	–	0
Parsons		–		6	–	3	–	1
Kentucky State		–		5	–	3	–	1
Hawaii		–		6	–	4	–	0
St. Norbert		–		5	–	4	–	0
Akron		–		4	–	4	–	1
Carnegie Mellon		–		4	–	4	–	0
Cortland		–		4	–	4	–	0
Northern Arizona		–		5	–	5	–	0
Northern Illinois		–		5	–	5	–	0
UC Riverside		–		4	–	4	–	1
UC Santa Barbara		–		5	–	5	–	0
Drake		–		4	–	5	–	0
Pacific (CA)		–		4	–	5	–	0
Portland State		–		4	–	6	–	0
Lincoln (MO)		–		3	–	5	–	0
Boston University		–		3	–	6	–	0
Lake Forest		–		3	–	6	–	0
Milwaukee		–		3	–	6	–	0
Southern Illinois		–		3	–	7	–	0
Colorado College		–		2	–	5	–	1
Rose Poly		–		1	–	6	–	2
Tampa		–		2	–	7	–	0
Wabash		–		2	–	7	–	0
Cal Poly Pomona		–		2	–	8	–	0
Mississippi Valley State		–		1	–	8	–	0

The 1967 Eastern Michigan Hurons football team represented Eastern Michigan University as an independent during the 1967 NCAA College Division football season. In their first season under head coach Dan Boisture, the Hurons compiled a 6–3 record and outscored their opponents, 173 to 77.

Eastern Michigan hired Boisture as its head football coach in July 1967. Boisture later commented that he was willing to go to a smaller school, saying, "There weren't many jobs open . . . Joan and I looked at the campus. It was a cute campus." Under his leadership, the team produced the longest period of sustained success since Elton Rynearson's days. The team posted winning seasons in all seven years of Boisture's coaching, including a 13-game winning streak that remains a school record.

== Schedule ==
Date	Opponent	Site	Result	Attendance	Source
September 16	Findlay	Briggs Field; Ypsilanti, MI	W 17–0	6,300	
September 23	Baldwin–Wallace	Briggs Field; Ypsilanti, MI	W 15–13	6,500	
September 30	at Eastern Illinois	Lincoln Field; Charleston, IL	W 28–12	4,500–5,000	
October 7	at Western Reserve	Ralph P. Adams Stadium; Cuyahoga Heights, OH	W 47–0	500	
October 14	John Carroll^{†}	Briggs Field; Ypsilanti, MI	W 34–0	12,400	
October 21	at Ferris State	Top Taggart Field; Big Rapids, MI	W 13–6	4,500	
October 28	at Wayne State (MI)	Tartar Field; Detroit, MI	L 3–20	4,500–6,000	
November 4	at Northeast Louisiana State	Brown Stadium; Monroe, LA	L 10–12	6,000	
November 11	at State College of Iowa	O. R. Latham Stadium; Cedar Falls, IA	L 6–14	4,000	
^{†}Homecoming
