= 1967 Cincinnati Bearcats football team =

American college football season

1967 Cincinnati Bearcats football
- Conference: Missouri Valley Conference
- Record: 3–6 (2–2 MVC)
- Head coach: Homer Rice (1st season)
- Captains: Tony Jackson; Jerry Mislik
- Home stadium: Nippert Stadium

1967 Missouri Valley Conference football standings
	Conf.					Overall
Team	W		L		T	W		L		T
North Texas State $	4	–	0	–	0	7	–	1	–	1
Tulsa	3	–	1	–	0	7	–	3	–	0
Cincinnati	2	–	2	–	0	3	–	6	–	0
Louisville	1	–	3	–	0	5	–	5	–	0
Wichita State	0	–	4	–	0	2	–	7	–	0
$ – Conference champion

The 1967 Cincinnati Bearcats football team represented University of Cincinnati as a member of the Missouri Valley Conference (MVC) during the 1967 NCAA University Division football season. Led by first-year head coach Homer Rice, the Bearcats compiled an overall record of 3–6 with a mark of 2–2 in conference play, placing third in the MVC. The team played home games at Nippert Stadium in Cincinnati.

== Schedule ==
Date	Opponent	Site	Result	Attendance	Source
September 23	Dayton*	Nippert Stadium; Cincinnati, OH	L 13–27	20,500	
September 30	at Memphis State*	Memphis Memorial Stadium; Memphis, TN (rivalry)	L 0–17	20,509	
October 7	Wichita State	Nippert Stadium; Cincinnati, OH	W 14–6	12,500	
October 14	Xavier*	Nippert Stadium; Cincinnati, OH (rivalry)	L 10–15	24,500	
October 21	at Tulsa	Skelly Stadium; Tulsa, OK	L 6–35	22,000	
October 28	North Texas State	Nippert Stadium; Cincinnati, OH	L 14–34	10,000	
November 4	Boston College*	Nippert Stadium; Cincinnati, OH	W 27–21	12,500	
November 11	at Louisville	Fairgrounds Stadium; Louisville, KY (rivalry)	W 13–7	10,679	
November 18	Miami (OH)*	Nippert Stadium; Cincinnati, OH (Victory Bell)	L 14–27	13,600	
*Non-conference game

== Roster ==
1967 Cincinnati Bearcats football team roster
Players
Coaches
Offense

Pos.	#	Name	Class
QB	12	Greg Cook	Jr
OT	77	Ron Nelson	Sr
WR	88	Jim O'Brien	So
RB	20	Lloyd Pate	Jr

Defense

Pos.	#	Name	Class

Special teams

Pos.	#	Name	Class

Head coach

- Homer Rice

Coordinators/assistant coaches

Legend

- (C) Team captain
- (S) Suspended
- (I) Ineligible
- Injured
- Redshirt
