= 1967 Southern Illinois Salukis football team =

American college football season

1967 Southern Illinois Salukis football
- Conference: Independent
- Record: 3–7
- Head coach: Dick Towers (1st season)
- Home stadium: McAndrew Stadium

1967 NCAA College Division independents football records
	Conf.			Overall
Team	W	L	T	W		L		T
Ashland		–		8	–	0	–	1
Northern Michigan		–		9	–	1	–	0
Indiana (PA)		–		8	–	1	–	0
Santa Clara		–		8	–	1	–	0
Northeastern		–		7	–	1	–	0
Wheaton (IL)		–		7	–	2	–	0
Samford		–		8	–	2	–	1
Wayne State (MI)		–		6	–	2	–	0
Chattanooga		–		7	–	3	–	0
Eastern Michigan		–		6	–	3	–	0
Tennessee A&I		–		6	–	3	–	0
Parsons		–		6	–	3	–	1
Kentucky State		–		5	–	3	–	1
Hawaii		–		6	–	4	–	0
St. Norbert		–		5	–	4	–	0
Akron		–		4	–	4	–	1
Carnegie Mellon		–		4	–	4	–	0
Cortland		–		4	–	4	–	0
Northern Arizona		–		5	–	5	–	0
Northern Illinois		–		5	–	5	–	0
UC Riverside		–		4	–	4	–	1
UC Santa Barbara		–		5	–	5	–	0
Drake		–		4	–	5	–	0
Pacific (CA)		–		4	–	5	–	0
Portland State		–		4	–	6	–	0
Lincoln (MO)		–		3	–	5	–	0
Boston University		–		3	–	6	–	0
Lake Forest		–		3	–	6	–	0
Milwaukee		–		3	–	6	–	0
Southern Illinois		–		3	–	7	–	0
Colorado College		–		2	–	5	–	1
Rose Poly		–		1	–	6	–	2
Tampa		–		2	–	7	–	0
Wabash		–		2	–	7	–	0
Cal Poly Pomona		–		2	–	8	–	0
Mississippi Valley State		–		1	–	8	–	0

The 1967 Southern Illinois Salukis football team was an American football team that represented Southern Illinois University (now known as Southern Illinois University Carbondale) as an independent during the 1967 NCAA College Division football season. Under first-year head coach Dick Towers, the team compiled a 3–7 record. The team played its home games at McAndrew Stadium in Carbondale, Illinois.

== Schedule ==
Date	Opponent	Site	Result	Attendance	Source
September 16	Northeast Missouri State	McAndrew Stadium; Carbondale, IL	W 18–7	3,000	
September 23	at Louisville	Fairgrounds Stadium; Louisville, KY	L 0–26	17,211	
September 30	Lincoln (MO)	McAndrew Stadium; Carbondale, IL	L 10–19	7,000	
October 7	at East Carolina	Ficklen Memorial Stadium; Greenville, NC	L 8–21	14,500	
October 14	Dayton	McAndrew Stadium; Carbondale, IL	L 14–34	4,500	
October 21	North Texas State	McAndrew Stadium; Carbondale, IL	L 0–37	3,000	
October 28	Tulsa	McAndrew Stadium; Carbondale, IL	W 16–13	15,500	
November 4	at Youngstown State	Rayen Stadium; Youngstown, OH	L 3–29	7,000	
November 11	at Ball State	Ball State Stadium; Muncie, IN	L 6–24	3,100	
November 18	Drake	McAndrew Stadium; Carbondale, IL	W 45–17	6,000	
