= Vernon Gale =

American football coach

Biographical details
- Born: c. 1929; Wyoming, U.S.
- Died: February 7, 1989

Playing career

Football
- 1949–1950: Wyoming
- Position: Halfback

Coaching career (HC unless noted)

Football
- 1953: Wyoming (assistant)
- 1954–1959: Valley City State
- 1960–1964: Iowa State (assistant)
- 1965–1971: Wayne State (MI)

Baseball
- 1955–1959: Valley City State

Head coaching record
- Overall: 51–44–5 (football); 18–24–2 (baseball)

Accomplishments and honors

Championships
- 2 NDIC (1954, 1958)

Vernon K. Gale (c. 1929 – February 7, 1989) was an American football player and college football and baseball coach. He served as the head football coach (1954–1959) and head baseball coach (1955–1959) at Valley City State University in Valley City, North Dakota. After serving as an assistant football coach at Iowa State University, he was lured to the head football coaching position at Wayne State University in Detroit, Michigan, where he stayed from 1965 to 1971.

== Head coaching record ==
=== Football ===
Year	Team	Overall	Conference	Standing	Bowl/playoffs
Valley City State Vikings (North Dakota Intercollegiate Conference) (1954–1959)
1954	Valley City State	7–1	6–0	T–1st	
1955	Valley City State	1–5	1–5	T–8th	
1956	Valley City State	1–4–3	1–2–3	7th	
1957	Valley City State	4–2–1	4–1–1	3rd	
1958	Valley City State	6–1	6–1	T–1st	
1959	Valley City State	4–3	3–3	4th	
Valley City State:		23–16–4	21–12–4		
Wayne State Tartars (Presidents' Athletic Conference) (1965)
1965	Wayne State	3–4–1	3–2–1	4th	
Wayne State Tartars (NCAA College Division independent) (1966–1971)
1966	Wayne State	2–6			
1967	Wayne State	6–2			
1968	Wayne State	3–6			
1969	Wayne State	4–4			
1970	Wayne State	6–2			
1971	Wayne State	4–4			
Wayne State:		28–28–1	3–2–1		
Total:		51–44–5			
National championship Conference title Conference division title or championship game berth
