= 1964 Eastern Michigan Hurons football team =

American college football season

1964 Eastern Michigan Hurons football
- Conference: Presidents' Athletic Conference
- Record: 4–3 (3–2 PAC)
- Head coach: Fred Trosko (13th season)
- MVP: Terrance Hurley
- Captains: George Hanoian; Bill MacGillivray
- Home stadium: Briggs Field

1964 Presidents' Athletic Conference football standings
	Conf.					Overall
Team	W		L		T	W		L		T
Wayne State (MI) $	4	–	1	–	1	4	–	3	–	1
Bethany (WV)	4	–	2	–	0	5	–	3	–	0
Eastern Michigan	3	–	2	–	0	4	–	3	–	0
John Carroll	4	–	3	–	0	4	–	4	–	0
Thiel	4	–	3	–	0	4	–	4	–	0
Western Reserve	4	–	3	–	1	4	–	3	–	1
Washington & Jefferson	3	–	3	–	0	5	–	3	–	0
Allegheny	2	–	4	–	0	3	–	5	–	0
Case Tech	0	–	7	–	0	0	–	8	–	0
$ – Conference champion

The 1964 Eastern Michigan Hurons football team represented Eastern Michigan University in the Presidents' Athletic Conference (PAC) during the 1964 NCAA College Division football season. In their 13th season under head coach Fred Trosko, the Hurons compiled a 4–3 record (3–2 against PAC opponents) and were outscored by their opponents, 110 to 73.

Trosko had success as the team's coach in the 1950s, but the program suffered a 29-game winless streak (0–27–2) from 1959 to 1962. The program's decline followed the decision of the Eastern Michigan administration not to award athletic scholarships. Competing with non-scholarship athletes against schools with scholarship athletes, Trosko's Eastern Michigan teams were unable to compete. In August 1965, Trosko abruptly quit as the school's head football coach, and it was reported that the resignation was the result of "an apparent break with school administrators over policy."

== Schedule ==
Date	Opponent	Site	Result	Attendance
September 26	Adrian*	Briggs Field; Ypsilanti, MI	W 7–0	5,500
October 10	at John Carroll	University Heights, OH	L 3–7	4,000
October 17	Allegheny^{†}	Briggs Field; Ypsilanti, MI	W 28–7	7,432
October 24	at Wayne State (MI)	Detroit, MI	L 0–13	3,000
October 31	Western Reserve	Briggs Field; Ypsilanti, MI	W 17–7	4,400
November 7	at Case Tech	Clarke Field; Cleveland, OH	W 48–26	1,000
November 14	at Ashland*	Ashland, OH	L 7–13	2,600
*Non-conference game; ^{†}Homecoming
