= Wayne State Tartars football, 1960–1969 =

American college football season

1960–1969 Wayne State Tartars football
- Conference: Presidents' Athletic Conference
- Head coach: Harold D. Willard (1960–1963); Stanley Marshall (1964); Vernon Gale (1965–1971)

The Wayne State Tartars football program, 1960–1969 represented Wayne State University during the 1960s as a member of the Presidents' Athletic Conference (PAC). The team was led by three head coaches during the decade: Harold D. Willard (1960–1963); Stanley Marshall (1964); and Vernon Gale (1965–1971).

== 1960 ==
1960 Wayne State Tartars football
- Conference: Presidents' Athletic Conference
- Record: 4–3 (3–2 PAC)
- Head coach: Harold D. Willard (1st season)

1960 Presidents' Athletic Conference football standings
	Conf.					Overall
Team	W		L		T	W		L		T
Western Reserve $	6	–	0	–	0	6	–	1	–	0
Thiel	4	–	1	–	0	4	–	2	–	1
John Carroll	3	–	2	–	0	3	–	4	–	0
Wayne State (MI)	3	–	2	–	0	4	–	3	–	0
Allegheny	3	–	3	–	0	3	–	3	–	1
Washington & Jefferson	1	–	4	–	0	1	–	6	–	0
Case Tech	1	–	5	–	0	1	–	5	–	1
Bethany (WV)	1	–	5	–	0	1	–	6	–	0
$ – Conference champion

The 1960 Wayne State Tartars football team represented Wayne State University of Detroit. In their first year under head coach Harold D. Willard, the Tartars compiled a 4–3 record (3–2 in conference games), tied for third place in the PAC, and outscored opponents by a total of 140 to 119.

=== Schedule ===
Date	Opponent	Site	Result	Attendance	Source
October 1	Millikin*	Detroit, MI	L 7–20	884	
October 8	at Case Tech	Cleveland, OH	W 33–14		
October 15	at Washington & Jefferson	Washington, PA	W 22–15		
October 22	John Carroll	Detroit, MI	L 20–28	1,105	
October 29	Western Reserve	Detroit, MI	L 18–28	970	
November 5	at Allegheny	Meadville, PA	W 26–6		
November 12	Taylor*	Detroit, MI	W 14–8	1,706	
*Non-conference game

== 1961 ==
1961 Wayne State Tartars football
- Conference: Presidents' Athletic Conference
- Record: 1–6 (1–4 PAC)
- Head coach: Harold D. Willard (2nd season)

1961 Presidents' Athletic Conference football standings
	Conf.					Overall
Team	W		L		T	W		L		T
Allegheny $	5	–	1	–	0	6	–	1	–	0
John Carroll	4	–	1	–	0	5	–	2	–	0
Western Reserve	5	–	2	–	0	5	–	2	–	0
Case Tech	4	–	2	–	0	4	–	3	–	0
Bethany (WV)	2	–	4	–	0	2	–	5	–	0
Thiel	2	–	4	–	0	2	–	4	–	0
Wayne State (MI)	1	–	4	–	0	1	–	5	–	0
Washington & Jefferson	0	–	5	–	0	0	–	7	–	0
$ – Conference champion

The 1961 Wayne State Tartars football team represented Wayne State University of Detroit. In their second year under head coach Harold D. Willard, the team compiled a 1–6 record (1–4 against PAC opponents), was outscored by a total of 271 to 37, and finished seventh in the PAC.

Wayne State linebacker Barry Sarver was named to the 1961 All-Presidents Athletic Conference football team.

On October 28, Wayne State suffered the worst defeat in PAC history, losing, 62-0, against John Carroll. The Tartars tallied minus-nine yards rushing in the game. Three weeks later, the team then lost to Wittenberg by a 77-0 margin.

=== Schedule ===
Date	Opponent	Site	Result	Attendance	Source
October 7	Wheaton (IL)*	Tartar Field; Detroit, MI	L 0–57		
October 14	Case Tech	Tartar Field; Detroit, MI	L 7–19		
October 21	Washington & Jefferson	Tartar Field; Detroit, MI	W 16–8		
October 28	at John Carroll^{†}	Hosford Stadium; Cleveland, OH	L 0–62	3,000	
November 4	at Western Reserve	Cleveland, OH	L 6–28		
November 11	Allegheny^{†}	Tartar Field; Detroit, MI	L 8–20	2,089	
November 18	at Wittenberg*	Wittenberg Stadium; Springfield, OH	L 0–77	4,200	
*Non-conference game; ^{†}Homecoming

== 1962 ==
1962 Wayne State Tartars football
- Conference: Presidents' Athletic Conference
- Record: 0–6–1 (0–4–1 PAC)
- Head coach: Harold D. Willard (3rd season)

1962 Presidents' Athletic Conference football standings
	Conf.					Overall
Team	W		L		T	W		L		T
John Carroll $	7	–	0	–	0	7	–	0	–	0
Bethany (WV)	6	–	1	–	0	6	–	1	–	0
Western Reserve	3	–	2	–	1	3	–	3	–	1
Washington & Jefferson	3	–	3	–	0	4	–	3	–	0
Allegheny	2	–	3	–	0	2	–	5	–	0
Thiel	2	–	5	–	0	2	–	5	–	0
Case Tech	1	–	6	–	0	1	–	6	–	0
Wayne State (MI)	0	–	4	–	1	0	–	6	–	1
$ – Conference champion

The 1962 Wayne State Tartars football team represented Wayne State University of Detroit. In their third year under head coach Harold D. Willard, the Tartars compiled a 0–6–1 record (0–4–1 in conference games), finished last in the PAC, and outscored opponents by a total of 197 to 53.

=== Schedule ===
Date	Opponent	Site	Result	Attendance	Source
October 6	at Wheaton*	Wheaton, IL	L 14–34		
October 13	John Carroll	Detroit, MI	L 14–67	1,304	
October 20	Western Reserve	Detroit, MI	T 0–0		
October 27	at Albion*	Albion, MI	L 6–30	4,500	
November 1	Thiel	Detroit, MI	L 6–27		
November 10	at Case Tech	Cleveland, OH	L 7–18		
November 17	Bethany (WV)	Detroit, MI	L 6–21		
*Non-conference game

== 1963 ==
1963 Wayne State Tartars football
- Conference: Presidents' Athletic Conference
- Record: 3–4 (3–3 PAC)
- Head coach: Harold D. Willard (4th season)

1963 Presidents' Athletic Conference football standings
	Conf.					Overall
Team	W		L		T	W		L		T
John Carroll $	6	–	0	–	0	7	–	0	–	0
Washington & Jefferson	4	–	2	–	0	5	–	2	–	0
Thiel	4	–	2	–	1	4	–	2	–	1
Wayne State (MI)	3	–	3	–	0	3	–	4	–	0
Allegheny	2	–	3	–	0	4	–	3	–	0
Bethany (WV)	2	–	5	–	0	2	–	5	–	0
Case Tech	2	–	5	–	0	2	–	5	–	0
Western Reserve	1	–	4	–	1	1	–	5	–	1
$ – Conference champion

The 1963 Wayne State Tartars football team represented Wayne State University of Detroit. In their fourth year under head coach Harold D. Willard, the Tartars compiled a 3–4 record (3–3 in conference games), finished in fourth place in the PAC, and were outscored by a total of 102 to 76.

=== Schedule ===
Date	Opponent	Site	Result	Attendance	Source
October 5	Marietta*	Detroit, MI	L 9–13		
October 12	at John Carroll	Cleveland, OH	L 0–20		
October 19	at Western Reserve	Cleveland, OH	W 19–13		
October 26	at Allegheny	Meadville, PA	L 21–22		
November 2	Thiel	Detroit, MI	W 6–0		
November 9	at Case Tech	Cleveland, OH	W 21–10		
November 16	at Bethany (WV)	Bethany, WV	L 0–24		
*Non-conference game

== 1964 ==
1964 Wayne State Tartars football

PAC champion
- Conference: Presidents' Athletic Conference
- Record: 4–3–1 (4–1–1 PAC)
- Head coach: Stanley Marshall (1st season)

1964 Presidents' Athletic Conference football standings
	Conf.					Overall
Team	W		L		T	W		L		T
Wayne State (MI) $	4	–	1	–	1	4	–	3	–	1
Bethany (WV)	4	–	2	–	0	5	–	3	–	0
Eastern Michigan	3	–	2	–	0	4	–	3	–	0
John Carroll	4	–	3	–	0	4	–	4	–	0
Thiel	4	–	3	–	0	4	–	4	–	0
Western Reserve	4	–	3	–	1	4	–	3	–	1
Washington & Jefferson	3	–	3	–	0	5	–	3	–	0
Allegheny	2	–	4	–	0	3	–	5	–	0
Case Tech	0	–	7	–	0	0	–	8	–	0
$ – Conference champion

The 1964 Wayne State Tartars football team represented Wayne State University as a member of the Presidents' Athletic Conference (PAC) during the 1964 NCAA College Division football season. In their first and only year under head coach Stanley Marshall, the Tartars compiled a 4–3–1 record (4–1–1 in conference games), won the PAC championship, and outscored opponents by a total of 79 to 77.

=== Schedule ===
Date	Opponent	Site	Result	Attendance	Source
September 26	at Allegheny	Meadville, PA	L 0–7		
October 3	John Carroll	Detroit, MI	W 19–14		
October 10	Western Reserve	Detroit, MI	T 0–0		
October 17	at Milwaukee	Shorewood Stadium; Shorewood, WI	L 9–33		
October 24	Eastern Michigan	Detroit, MI	W 13–0	3,000	
October 31	at Case Tech	Cleveland, OH	W 23–9		
November 7	at Thiel	Greenville, PA	W 12–7		
November 14	at Marietta	Marietta, OH	L 3–7		

== 1965 ==
1965 Wayne State Tartars football
- Conference: Presidents' Athletic Conference
- Record: 3–4–1 (3–2–1 PAC)
- Head coach: Vernon Gale (1st season)

1965 Presidents' Athletic Conference football standings
	Conf.					Overall
Team	W		L		T	W		L		T
Bethany (WV) $	5	–	1	–	0	5	–	3	–	0
John Carroll	5	–	1	–	1	5	–	1	–	1
Eastern Michigan	3	–	1	–	1	3	–	4	–	1
Wayne State (MI)	3	–	2	–	1	3	–	4	–	1
Western Reserve	3	–	4	–	1	3	–	4	–	1
Washington & Jefferson	2	–	4	–	0	4	–	4	–	0
Allegheny	2	–	4	–	0	3	–	5	–	0
Case Tech	2	–	5	–	0	3	–	5	–	0
Thiel	2	–	5	–	0	3	–	5	–	0
$ – Conference champion

The 1965 Wayne State Tartars football team represented Wayne State University as a member of the Presidents' Athletic Conference (PAC) during the 1965 NCAA College Division football season. In their first year under head coach Vernon Gale, the Tartars compiled a 3–4–1 record (3–2–1 in conference games), finished in fourth place in the PAC, and were outscored by a total of 126 to 91.

=== Schedule ===
Date	Opponent	Site	Result	Attendance	Source
September 25	Allegheny	Detroit, MI	W 7–0	1,071	
October 2	at John Carroll	Cleveland, OH	T 0–0	3,500	
October 9	at Western Reserve	Cleveland, OH	L 6–22	1,500	
October 17	Milwaukee*	Tartar Field; Detroit, MI	L 34–41	1,701	
October 23	at Eastern Michigan*	Briggs Field; Ypsilanti, MI	L 0–20	7,200-7,500	
October 30	at Case Tech	Cleveland, OH	W 23–7	1,850	
November 6	Thiel	Detroit, MI	W 7–6	850	
November 13	Albion*	Detroit, MI	L 14–30	1,478	
*Non-conference game

== 1966 ==
1966 Wayne State Tartars football
- Conference: Independent
- Record: 2–6
- Head coach: Vernon Gale (2nd season)

1966 NCAA College Division independents football records
	Conf.			Overall
Team	W	L	T	W		L		T
St. Norbert		–		7	–	1	–	1
Parsons		–		9	–	2	–	0
Drake		–		8	–	2	–	0
Northern Illinois		–		8	–	2	–	0
Indiana (PA)		–		7	–	2	–	0
Santa Clara		–		7	–	2	–	0
Cortland		–		6	–	2	–	0
Northeastern		–		6	–	2	–	0
Akron		–		6	–	3	–	0
Northern Michigan		–		6	–	3	–	1
Samford		–		6	–	3	–	1
Carnegie Tech		–		5	–	3	–	0
Eastern Michigan		–		5	–	3	–	1
Ashland		–		5	–	3	–	2
Northern Arizona		–		6	–	4	–	0
UC Santa Barbara		–		6	–	4	–	0
Wheaton (IL)		–		5	–	4	–	0
Boston University		–		5	–	5	–	0
Cal Poly Pomona		–		5	–	5	–	0
Chattanooga		–		5	–	5	–	0
Colorado College		–		4	–	4	–	0
Wabash		–		4	–	4	–	1
Milwaukee		–		4	–	5	–	1
Southern Illinois		–		4	–	5	–	1
UC Riverside		–		4	–	5	–	0
Tampa		–		4	–	5	–	0
Rose Poly		–		3	–	4	–	1
Hawaii		–		4	–	6	–	0
Portland State		–		4	–	6	–	0
Lake Forest		–		2	–	5	–	0
Wayne State (MI)		–		2	–	6	–	0
Mississippi Valley State		–		2	–	7	–	0

The 1966 Wayne State Tartars football team represented Wayne State University as a member of the Presidents' Athletic Conference (PAC) during the 1966 NCAA College Division football season. In their second year under head coach Vernon Gale, the Tartars compiled a 2–6 record and were outscored by a total of 233 to 128.

=== Schedule ===
Date	Opponent	Site	Result	Attendance	Source
September 24	Milwaukee	UD Stadium; Detroit, MI	L 20–37	3,360	
October 1	at Washington University	St. Louis, MO	L 12–56	1,000	
October 15	at Chicago Circle	Gately Stadium; Chicago, IL	L 36–39	1,000	
October 22	Western Reserve	Detroit, MI	W 27–24	1,000	
October 29	at Eastern Michigan	Briggs Field; Ypsilanti, MI	L 0–16	5,000	
November 5	Case Tech	Detroit, MI	W 26–0	400	
November 12	Alma	Detroit, MI	L 7–17	2,000	
November 19	at Central Michigan	Alumni Field; Mount Pleasant, MI	L 0–44	1,000	

== 1967 ==
1967 Wayne Tartars football
- Conference: Independent
- Record: 6–2
- Head coach: Vernon Gale (3rd season)
- Captains: Dave Krupski; A. J. Vaughn
- Home stadium: Tartar Field

1967 NCAA College Division independents football records
	Conf.			Overall
Team	W	L	T	W		L		T
Ashland		–		8	–	0	–	1
Northern Michigan		–		9	–	1	–	0
Indiana (PA)		–		8	–	1	–	0
Santa Clara		–		8	–	1	–	0
Northeastern		–		7	–	1	–	0
Wheaton (IL)		–		7	–	2	–	0
Samford		–		8	–	2	–	1
Wayne State (MI)		–		6	–	2	–	0
Chattanooga		–		7	–	3	–	0
Eastern Michigan		–		6	–	3	–	0
Tennessee A&I		–		6	–	3	–	0
Parsons		–		6	–	3	–	1
Kentucky State		–		5	–	3	–	1
Hawaii		–		6	–	4	–	0
St. Norbert		–		5	–	4	–	0
Akron		–		4	–	4	–	1
Carnegie Mellon		–		4	–	4	–	0
Cortland		–		4	–	4	–	0
Northern Arizona		–		5	–	5	–	0
Northern Illinois		–		5	–	5	–	0
UC Riverside		–		4	–	4	–	1
UC Santa Barbara		–		5	–	5	–	0
Drake		–		4	–	5	–	0
Pacific (CA)		–		4	–	5	–	0
Portland State		–		4	–	6	–	0
Lincoln (MO)		–		3	–	5	–	0
Boston University		–		3	–	6	–	0
Lake Forest		–		3	–	6	–	0
Milwaukee		–		3	–	6	–	0
Southern Illinois		–		3	–	7	–	0
Colorado College		–		2	–	5	–	1
Rose Poly		–		1	–	6	–	2
Tampa		–		2	–	7	–	0
Wabash		–		2	–	7	–	0
Cal Poly Pomona		–		2	–	8	–	0
Mississippi Valley State		–		1	–	8	–	0

The 1967 Wayne State Tartars football team represented Wayne State University as an independent during the 1967 NCAA College Division football season. The team compiled a 7–2 record, averaged 376.1 yard of total offense per game, and scored 275 points and 40 touchdowns, each of which was a school record at the time. Vernon Gale was in his third year as the team's head coach. The team's tallies of 48 points against Michigan Tech and 49 points against Western Reserve were the highest point totals by a Wayne football team since 1951.

The team began the season with seven consecutive victories. In the sixth victory against Eastern Michigan, a capacity crowd was drawn to Tartar Field, leading Detroit Free Press columnist Joe Falls to write: "They were standing on rooftops, fence tops, car tops and tree tops – anything that would hold them. They jammed into those rickety old porches along Hobart Street and they climbed telephone poles and held on for dear life. . . . This was backyard football at its best – maybe the finest moment in the history of Wayne State University."

The team's statistical leaders included quarterback A. J. "Apple Juice" Vaughn with 1,090 passing yards and 776 rushing yards and Paul Hay with 253 receiving yards. Vaughn set school records (since broken) with 17 touchdown passes, 207.3 yards of total offense per game, 1,882 yards of total offense, and a 142.01 passing efficiency rating. In Wayne's victory over Wisconsin-Milwaukee, Vaughn set a national NCAA College Division record with 555 yards of total offense (271 rushing yards on 26 carries and 284 passing yards with 11 completions on 21 passes). At the end of the 1967 season, the Detroit Free Press joked that "the Wayne State crew turned out more records in the past nine weeks than Motown, let alone the RCA victors."

The 1967 season was the last year in which Wayne State played its home games at Tartar Field. WSU Stadium opened in 1968.

=== Schedule ===
Date	Opponent	Site	Result	Attendance	Source
September 23	Michigan Tech	Tartar Field; Detroit, MI	W 48–7		
September 30	at Milwaukee	Shorewood Stadium; Shorewood, WI	W 39–31	5,000	
October 7	Chicago Circle	Tartar Field; Detroit, MI	W 31–6	1,329	
October 14	Ferris State	Tartar Field; Detroit, MI	W 27–13		
October 21	at Western Reserve	Cleveland, OH	W 49–20		
October 28	Eastern Michigan	Tartar Field; Detroit, MI	W 20–3	4,500	
November 4	at Case Tech	Shaw Stadium; Cleveland, OH	W 47–18		
November 11	at Eastern Illinois	Panther Stadium; Charleston, IL	L 14–20	2,000	
November 18	Central Michigan^{†}	Tartar Field; Detroit, MI	L 0–34	3,000–5,000	
^{†}Homecoming

=== Players ===
The following players were awarded letters for their participation on Wayne State's 1967 football team:

- Leonard Boehm
- Jeffrey Cetlinski
- Wilfred Cortis Jr.
- George Crawford
- Alan Faigin
- Gregory Gargulinski
- Peter Garrisi
- Richard Goranowski
- Edward Grewe
- Paul Hay
- Louis Howson
- Restine Jackson III
- Leit Jones
- Charles Kirkland
- James Konopka
- David Krupski - co-captain
- David Lillvis
- Ronald Lock
- Edward Pavoris
- Joseph Piersante
- David Redman
- Douglas Rynaert
- Mark Rich
- Douglas Rowe
- Kenneth Semelsberger
- Marshall Shencopp
- Thomas Sheppard
- Ronald Solack
- Alexander Tischler
- A. J. Vaughn - co-captain
- Thomas Wilson

== 1968 ==
1968 Wayne State Tartars football
- Conference: Independent
- Record: 3–6
- Head coach: Vernon Gale (4th season)

1968 NCAA College Division independents football records
	Conf.			Overall
Team	W	L	T	W		L		T
No. 2 San Diego State		–		9	–	0	–	1
No. 3 Chattanooga		–		9	–	1	–	0
Indiana State		–		9	–	1	–	0
Indiana (PA)		–		9	–	1	–	0
Nevada Southern		–		8	–	1	–	0
Ashland		–		8	–	2	–	0
No. 7 Eastern Michigan		–		8	–	2	–	0
Lincoln (MO)		–		8	–	2	–	0
St. Norbert		–		6	–	2	–	1
Tennessee State		–		6	–	2	–	1
UC Riverside		–		6	–	2	–	1
Hawaii		–		7	–	3	–	0
No. 14 Tampa		–		7	–	3	–	0
No. 17 Akron		–		7	–	3	–	1
Northeastern		–		6	–	3	–	0
Southern Illinois		–		6	–	3	–	0
Cortland		–		5	–	3	–	0
Boston University		–		5	–	3	–	1
Northern Arizona		–		6	–	4	–	0
Pacific (CA)		–		6	–	4	–	0
Samford		–		6	–	4	–	0
Northern Michigan		–		5	–	4	–	0
Parsons		–		5	–	4	–	0
Wheaton (IL)		–		5	–	4	–	0
Drake		–		5	–	5	–	0
UC Santa Barbara		–		4	–	4	–	1
Santa Clara		–		4	–	5	–	0
Portland State		–		4	–	6	–	0
Illinois College		–		2	–	4	–	2
Wayne State (MI)		–		3	–	6	–	0
Wabash		–		3	–	6	–	0
Colorado College		–		2	–	6	–	0
Kentucky State		–		2	–	7	–	0
Milwaukee		–		2	–	7	–	0
Lake Forest		–		2	–	8	–	0
Northern Illinois		–		2	–	8	–	0
Mississippi Valley State		–		1	–	7	–	0
UC San Diego		–		0	–	7	–	0
Rose Poly		–		0	–	8	–	0
Cal Poly Pomona		–		0	–	10	–	0
Rankings from AP small college poll

The 1968 Wayne State Tartars football team represented Wayne State University as an independent during the 1968 NCAA College Division football season. In their fourth year under head coach Vernon Gale, the Tartars compiled a 3–6 record and were outscored by a total of 232 to 144.

=== Schedule ===
Date	Opponent	Site	Result	Attendance	Source
September 21	at Michigan Tech	Houghton, MI	W 23–13	3,250–3,500	
September 28	Temple	Detroit, MI	L 6–26	5,210–8,212	
October 4	at Chicago Circle	Soldier Field; Chicago, IL	L 0–13	3,500	
October 12	at Ferris State	Big Rapids, MI	L 8–16	10,000	
October 19	at Augustana (SD)	Sioux Falls, SD	L 7–34		
October 26	Washington University	Detroit, MI	W 61–29	3,318	
November 2	Washington & Jefferson	Detroit, MI	W 14–6	1,111	
November 9	Eastern Illinois	Detroit, MI	L 19–60	737	
November 16	at Central Michigan	Alumni Field; Mount Pleasant, MI	L 6–35	2,500	

== 1969 ==
1969 Wayne State Tartars football
- Conference: Independent
- Record: 4–4
- Head coach: Vernon Gale (5th season)

1969 NCAA College Division independents football records
	Conf.			Overall
Team	W	L	T	W		L		T
No. 3 Akron		–		9	–	1	–	0
Indiana (PA)		–		8	–	1	–	0
Boston University		–		9	–	2	–	0
No. 9 Tampa		–		8	–	2	–	0
Tennessee State		–		7	–	1	–	1
Colorado College		–		6	–	2	–	0
Drake		–		7	–	2	–	2
Northern Arizona		–		7	–	3	–	0
Illinois College		–		5	–	2	–	1
Mankato State		–		6	–	3	–	0
Hawaii		–		6	–	3	–	1
Indiana State		–		6	–	3	–	1
Ashland		–		5	–	3	–	1
Lincoln (MO)		–		5	–	3	–	1
Portland State		–		6	–	4	–	0
Santa Clara		–		6	–	4	–	0
UNLV		–		6	–	4	–	0
Eastern Michigan		–		5	–	4	–	0
St. Norbert		–		5	–	4	–	0
Cortland		–		4	–	4	–	0
Northern Michigan		–		5	–	5	–	0
Nevada		–		5	–	5	–	0
Rose Poly		–		4	–	4	–	0
Southern Illinois		–		5	–	5	–	0
Wayne State (MI)		–		4	–	4	–	0
Chattanooga		–		4	–	6	–	0
Chicago		–		2	–	4	–	0
Milwaukee		–		3	–	6	–	0
Northeastern		–		3	–	6	–	0
Wabash		–		3	–	6	–	0
Wheaton (IL)		–		3	–	6	–	0
Samford		–		2	–	6	–	1
Lake Forest		–		2	–	6	–	0
Parsons		–		2	–	8	–	0
Kentucky State		–		0	–	8	–	0
Rankings from AP small college poll

The 1969 Wayne State Tartars football team represented Wayne State University as an independent during the 1969 NCAA College Division football season. In their fifth year under head coach Vernon Gale, the Tartars compiled a 4–4 record and outscored opponents by a total of 155 to 147.

=== Schedule ===
Date	Opponent	Site	Result	Attendance	Source
September 20	Ferris State	Detroit, MI	W 14–7	4,218	
September 27	at Coast Guard	New London, CT	W 21–7	3,500	
October 4	at Temple	Temple Stadium; Philadelphia, PA	L 0–34	9,000	
October 11	Bradley	Detroit, MI	W 47–21	2,814	
October 18	at Augustana (SD)	Sioux Falls, SD	L 7–25	5,825	
November 1	Chicago Circle	Wayne Stadium; Detroit, MI	W 33–0	1,875	
November 8	at Kalamazoo	Kalamazoo, MI	L 13–18	1,200	
November 15	Central Michigan	Detroit, MI	L 20–35	1,392	
