= 1967 Louisville Cardinals football team =

American college football season

1967 Louisville Cardinals football
- Conference: Missouri Valley Conference
- Record: 5–5 (1–3 MVC)
- Head coach: Frank Camp (22nd season)
- Home stadium: Fairgrounds Stadium

1967 Missouri Valley Conference football standings
	Conf.					Overall
Team	W		L		T	W		L		T
North Texas State $	4	–	0	–	0	7	–	1	–	1
Tulsa	3	–	1	–	0	7	–	3	–	0
Cincinnati	2	–	2	–	0	3	–	6	–	0
Louisville	1	–	3	–	0	5	–	5	–	0
Wichita State	0	–	4	–	0	2	–	7	–	0
$ – Conference champion

The 1967 Louisville Cardinals football team was an American football team that represented the University of Louisville in the Missouri Valley Conference (MVC) during the 1967 NCAA University Division football season. In their 22nd season under head coach Frank Camp, the Cardinals compiled a 5–5 record (1–3 against conference opponents) and outscored opponents by a total of 260 to 162.

The team's statistical leaders included Wally Oyler with 1,039 passing yards, Wayne Patrick with 582 rushing yards and 60 points scored, and Jim Zamberlan with 559 receiving yards.

== Schedule ==
Date	Opponent	Site	Result	Attendance	Source
September 16	at Drake*	Drake Stadium; Des Moines, IA	W 46–7	6,500	
September 23	Southern Illinois*	Fairgrounds Stadium; Louisville, KY	W 26–0	17,211	
September 30	at North Texas State	Fouts Field; Denton, TX	L 28–30	12,500	
October 7	Dayton*	Fairgrounds Stadium; Louisville, KY	W 29–7	15,012	
October 14	at East Carolina*	Ficklen Memorial Stadium; Greenville, NC	L 13–18	11,118	
October 21	Marshall*	Fairgrounds Stadium; Louisville, KY	W 43–7	12,507	
October 28	Wichita State	Fairgrounds Stadium; Louisville, KY	W 24–17	10,000	
November 4	at Kent State*	Memorial Stadium; Kent, OH	L 21–28	11,500	
November 11	Cincinnati	Fairgrounds Stadium; Louisville, KY (rivalry)	L 7–13	10,679	
December 2	at Tulsa	Skelly Field; Tulsa, OK	L 23–35	12,000	
*Non-conference game
