= Stanley Marshall =

American football player and coach

Biographical details
- Born: January 8, 1927; Yankton, South Dakota, U.S.
- Died: June 14, 1980 (aged 53); Brookings, South Dakota, U.S.

Playing career

Football
- 1947–1949: South Dakota State

Coaching career (HC unless noted)

Football
- 1954–1956: Jamestown
- 1957–1963: South Dakota State (assistant)
- 1964: Wayne State (MI)

Administrative career (AD unless noted)
- 1965–1980: South Dakota State

Head coaching record
- Overall: 20–8–2 (college football)

Accomplishments and honors

Championships
- Football; 2 NDIC (1955–1956); 1 PAC (1964)

Stanley J. Marshall (January 8, 1927 – June 14, 1980) was an American football player, coach of football and track, and college athletics administrator. He served as the head football coach at Jamestown College—now known at the University of Jamestown—in Jamestown, North Dakota from 1954 to 1956 an at Wayne State University in Detroit, Michigan for one season in 1964, compiling a career college football coaching record of 20–8–2. He also coached track at Jamestown. Marshall was the athletic director at South Dakota State University from 1965 to 1980. He began his coaching career in the early 1950s at high school level, coaching football, basketball, and track in South Dakota.

== Head coaching record ==
=== College football ===
Year	Team	Overall	Conference	Standing	Bowl/playoffs
Jamestown Jimmies (North Dakota Intercollegiate Conference) (1954–1956)
1954	Jamestown	6–2	5–1	3rd	
1955	Jamestown	6–1	5–1	T–1st	
1956	Jamestown	4–2–1	4–1–1	1st	
Jamestown:		16–5–1	14–3–1		
Wayne State Tartars (Presidents' Athletic Conference) (1964)
1964	Wayne State	4–3–1	4–1–1	1st	
Jamestown:		4–3–1	4–1–1		
Total:		20–8–2			
National championship Conference title Conference division title or championship game berth
