= Boyd Converse =

American football coach and college athletics administrator

Biographical details
- Born: February 18, 1932; Milburn, Oklahoma, U.S.
- Died: May 31, 2010 (aged 78); Tishomingo, Oklahoma, U.S.

Playing career

Football
- c. 1952: Southeastern State

Basketball
- c. 1952: Southeastern State

Baseball
- c. 1952: Southeastern State
- Positions: End (football); Guard (basketball); Pitcher (baseball)

Coaching career (HC unless noted)

Football
- c. 1954: Fort Huachuca (assistant)
- 1957: Paris (assistant)
- 1958–1961: Paris
- 1964–1966: Kilgore
- 1967: Wichita State

Basketball
- 1956–1967: East Texas State (assistant)
- 1957–1962: Paris
- 1962–1963: Baylor (freshmen)

Baseball
- c. 1954: Fort Huachuca

Administrative career (AD unless noted)
- 1972–1989: Northeastern Oklahoma A&M

Head coaching record
- Overall: 2–7–1 (college football); 41–27–2 (junior college football)
- Bowls: 2–0 (junior college)

Accomplishments and honors

Championships
- Football; 1 NJCAA National (1966); 1 TJCFF (1966)

Boyd Franklin "Cotton" Converse (February 18, 1932 – May 31, 2010) was an American college football and college basketball coach and athletics administrator. He served as the head football coach at Wichita State University for one season in 1967, compiling a record of 2–7–1. Converse was also the head football coach at Paris Junior College in Paris, Texas from 1958 to 1961 and Kilgore College in Kilgore, Texas. At Kilgore, he led his 1966 team to the NJCAA National Football Championship. Converse was the athletic director at Northeastern Oklahoma A&M College from 1972 to 1989.

Converse attended Southeastern State College—now known as Southeastern Oklahoma State University, where he won 11 varsity letters in three sports. He played football as an end, basketball as a guard and baseball as a pitcher. After graduating from Southeastern State, Converse served in the United States Army. At Fort Huachuca in Cochise County, Arizona, he was an assistant football coach and head baseball coach. Following to years in the army, Converse went to East Texas State Teachers College—now known as Texas A&M University–Commerce to pursue a master's degree and work as an assistant basketball coach. In early 1957, Converse was hired at Paris Junior College as head basketball coach and line coach for the football team under head coach Dee Alexander.

Converse succeeded Alexander as head football coach at Paris in 1958, and led the team to a record of 20–19–1 in four seasons before the program was disbanded. He remained head basketball coach at Paris through 1962 and then went to Baylor University as coach of the freshmen basketball team.

Converse died in 2010 after a long illness.

== Head coaching record ==
=== College football ===
Year	Team	Overall	Conference	Standing	Bowl/playoffs
Wichita State Shockers (Missouri Valley Conference) (1967)
1967	Wichita State	2–7–1	0–4	5th	
Wichita State:		2–7–1	0–4		
Total:		2–7–1			

=== Junior college football ===
Year	Team	Overall	Conference	Standing	Bowl/playoffs
Paris Dragons (Texas Eastern Conference) (1958–1961)
1958	Paris	3–5–1	0–3	4th	
1959	Paris	3–6	1–2	3rd	
1960	Paris	6–4	4–4	T–2nd	
1961	Paris	5–5	3–5	4th	
Paris:		17–20–1	8–14		
Kilgore Rangers (Texas Junior College Football Federation) (1964–1966)
1964	Kilgore	6–3–1	4–3–1	4th	
1965	Kilgore	8–3	4–3	T–2nd	W El Karubah Shrine Bowl
1966	Kilgore	10–1	6–1	T–1st	W Shrine Bowl
Kilgore:		24–7–1	14–7–1		
Total:		41–27–2			
National championship Conference title Conference division title or championship game berth
