= 1967 North Texas State Mean Green football team =

American college football season

1967 North Texas State Mean Green football

MVC champion
- Conference: Missouri Valley Conference
- Record: 7–1–1 (4–0 MVC)
- Head coach: Rod Rust (1st season)
- Home stadium: Fouts Field

1967 Missouri Valley Conference football standings
	Conf.					Overall
Team	W		L		T	W		L		T
North Texas State $	4	–	0	–	0	7	–	1	–	1
Tulsa	3	–	1	–	0	7	–	3	–	0
Cincinnati	2	–	2	–	0	3	–	6	–	0
Louisville	1	–	3	–	0	5	–	5	–	0
Wichita State	0	–	4	–	0	2	–	7	–	0
$ – Conference champion

The 1967 North Texas State Mean Green football team was an American football team that represented North Texas State University (now known as the University of North Texas) during the 1967 NCAA University Division football season as a member of the Missouri Valley Conference. In their first year under head coach Rod Rust, the team compiled a 7–1–1 record.

== Schedule ==
Date	Opponent	Site	Result	Attendance	Source
September 23	Drake*	Fouts Field; Denton, TX	W 31–0	12,600	
September 30	Louisville	Fouts Field; Denton, TX	W 30–28	12,500	
October 7	at New Mexico State*	Memorial Stadium; Las Cruces, NM	T 31–31		
October 14	Colorado State*	Fouts Field; Denton, TX	W 21–10	9,500	
October 21	at Southern Illinois*	McAndrew Stadium; Carbondale, IL	W 37–0	3,000	
October 28	at Cincinnati	Nippert Stadium; Cincinnati, OH	W 34–14	10,000	
November 11	Wichita State^{†}	Fouts Field; Denton, TX	W 20–14	18,900	
November 18	Tulsa	Fouts Field; Denton, TX	W 54–12	16,000–16,200	
November 25	at Memphis State*	Memphis Memorial Stadium; Memphis, TN	L 20–29	14,102	
*Non-conference game; ^{†}Homecoming
