= 1967 Tulsa Golden Hurricane football team =

American college football season

1967 Tulsa Golden Hurricane football
- Conference: Missouri Valley Conference
- Record: 7–3 (3–1 MVC)
- Head coach: Glenn Dobbs (7th season)
- Home stadium: Skelly Stadium

1967 Missouri Valley Conference football standings
| | Conf. | | | | | Overall |
| Team | W | | L | | T | W | | L | | T |
|---|---|---|---|---|---|---|---|---|---|---|
| North Texas State $ | 4 | – | 0 | – | 0 | 7 | – | 1 | – | 1 |
| Tulsa | 3 | – | 1 | – | 0 | 7 | – | 3 | – | 0 |
| Cincinnati | 2 | – | 2 | – | 0 | 3 | – | 6 | – | 0 |
| Louisville | 1 | – | 3 | – | 0 | 5 | – | 5 | – | 0 |
| Wichita State | 0 | – | 4 | – | 0 | 2 | – | 7 | – | 0 |
$ – Conference champion

The 1967 Tulsa Golden Hurricane football team represented the University of Tulsa during the 1967 NCAA University Division football season. In their seventh year under head coach Glenn Dobbs, the Golden Hurricane compiled a 7–3 record, 3–1 against conference opponents, and finished in second place in the Missouri Valley Conference.

The team's statistical leaders included Mike Stripling with 1,271 passing yards, Cee Ellison with 661 rushing yards, and Rick Eber with 1,168 receiving yards.

== Schedule ==
| Date | Opponent | Site | Result | Attendance | Source |
|---|---|---|---|---|---|
| September 30 | at Arkansas* | Razorback Stadium; Fayetteville, AR | W 14–12 | 41,000 | |
| October 7 | Idaho State* | Skelly Stadium; Tulsa, OK | W 58–0 | 23,500 | |
| October 14 | Tampa* | Skelly Stadium; Tulsa, OK | W 77–0 | 21,500 | |
| October 21 | Cincinnati | Skelly Stadium; Tulsa, OK | W 35–6 | 22,000 | |
| October 28 | at Southern Illinois* | McAndrew Stadium; Carbondale, IL | L 13–16 | 15,500 | |
| November 4 | at Wichita State | Veterans Field; Wichita, KS | W 14–0 | 12,803 | |
| November 11 | Wake Forest*^{†} | Skelly Stadium; Tulsa, OK | L 24–31 | 23,500 | |
| November 18 | at North Texas State | Fouts Field; Denton, TX | L 12–54 | 16,000–16,200 | |
| November 25 | No. 10 Houston* | Skelly Stadium; Tulsa, OK | W 22–13 | 26,300 | |
| December 2 | Louisville | Skelly Stadium; Tulsa, OK | W 35–23 | 12,000 | |
*Non-conference game; ^{†}Homecoming; Rankings from AP Poll released prior to the game

== After the season ==
=== 1968 NFL/AFL draft ===
The following Golden Hurricane players were selected in the 1968 NFL/AFL draft following the season.

| Round | Pick | Player | Position | Club |
|---|---|---|---|---|
| 4 | 85 | Willie Crittendon | Defensive tackle | New Orleans Saints (NFL) |
| 6 | 162 | Rick Eber | Wide receiver | Atlanta Falcons (NFL) |
| 8 | 214 | Karl Henke | Defensive end | New York Jets (AFL) |
| 9 | 223 | Joe Blake | Tackle | New Orleans Saints (NFL) |
| 9 | 227 | Gary McDermott | Running back | Buffalo Bills (AFL) |
| 9 | 229 | Greg Barton | Quarterback | Detroit Lions (NFL) |
| 13 | 334 | Bob Joswick | Defensive end | Miami Dolphins (AFL) |
