= Homer Rice =

American football player and coach (1927–2024)

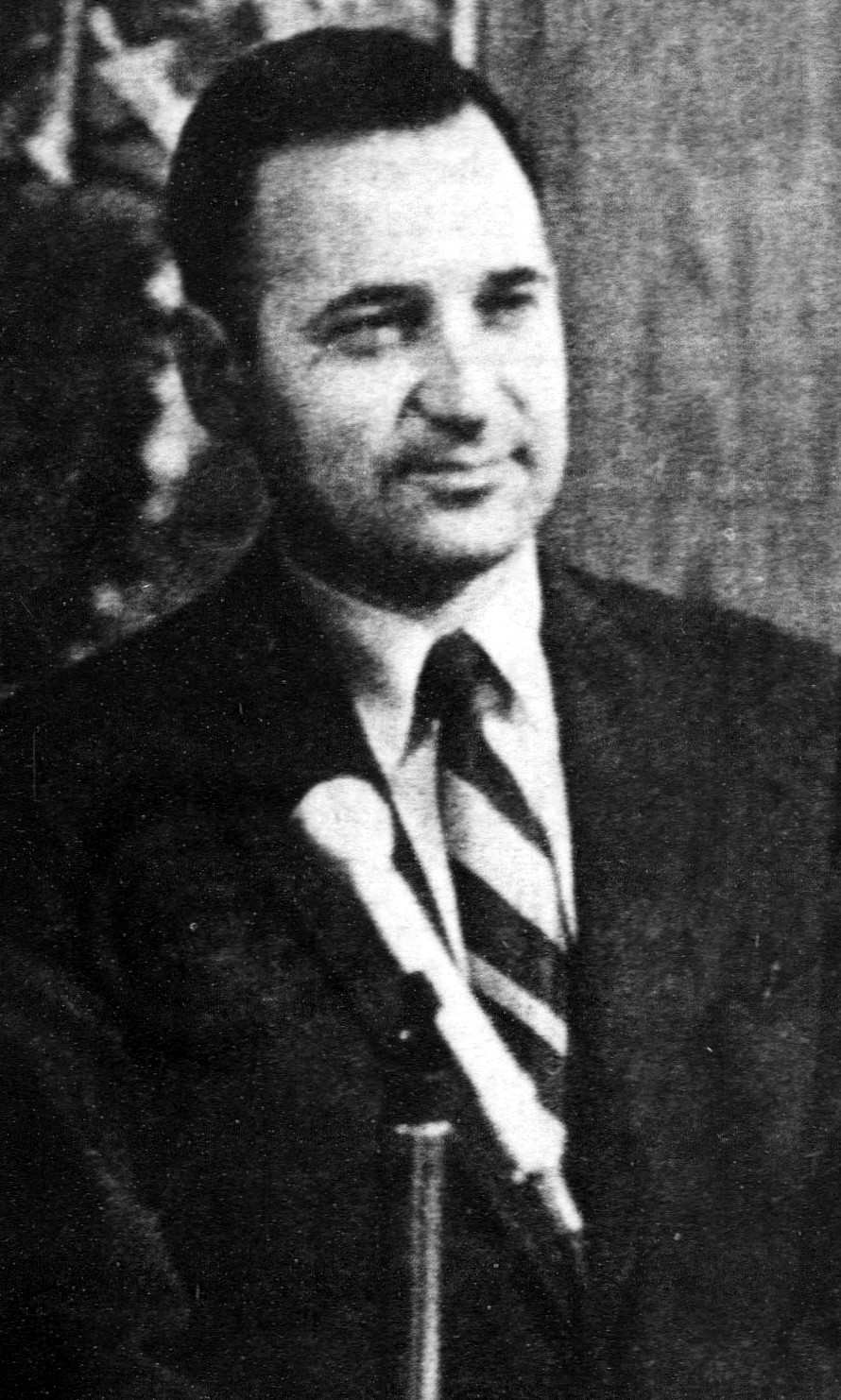
- Rice in 1969

Biographical details
- Born: February 20, 1927; Bellevue, Kentucky, U.S.
- Died: June 10, 2024 (aged 97)

Coaching career (HC unless noted)
- 1951: Wartburg Central HS (TN)
- 1952–1953: Spring City HS (TN)
- 1954–1961: Ft. Thomas Highlands HS (KY)
- 1962–1965: Kentucky (assistant)
- 1966: Oklahoma (backs)
- 1967–1968: Cincinnati
- 1976–1977: Rice
- 1978–1979: Cincinnati Bengals

Administrative career (AD unless noted)
- 1969–1975: North Carolina
- 1976–1977: Rice
- 1980–1997: Georgia Tech

Head coaching record
- Overall: 12–28–1 (college); 8–19 (NFL); 101–9–7 (high school)

Homer C. Rice (February 20, 1927 – June 10, 2024) was an American football player, coach, and college athletics administrator. As Director of Athletics at Georgia Tech, Rice successfully developed and implemented the Total Person Program which is now the model for NCAA Life Skills Program that is in place at universities throughout the nation.

== Career ==
=== Early career ===
Rice attended Centre College in Danville, Kentucky, where he lettered in both football and baseball. He was a Collier's All-American in football in 1948 and made a lasting impact on the Centre football program, as the team hands out the Homer Rice Award to its special team's most valuable player each season. He was named to the Centre Athletics Hall of Fame in 1992. From 1951 to 1961 Rice coached high school football in Tennessee and Kentucky, compiling a record of 101–9–7 while utilizing the triple option offense. In 1962, Charlie Bradshaw hired Rice to be his offensive coordinator at the University of Kentucky. He coached the offense at Kentucky for four years, leading the SEC in offense and winning the national passing title. During the 1966 season, he served as offensive coordinator for the University of Oklahoma under head coach Jim Mackenzie. From 1967 to 1968, he served as the head football coach at the University of Cincinnati, where he compiled an 8–10–1 record. After Rice accepted the head coaching position at the University of Cincinnati, Oklahoma's coach Mackenzie died of a massive heart attack. Upon Mackenzie's death, Oklahoma's athletic director and the president called Rice to request that he return to replace Mackenzie as head coach at Oklahoma. Rice had already hired his staff at Cincinnati and turned down the Oklahoma job to stay committed to his staff at Cincinnati.

From 1969 to 1975, he served as the athletic director at the University of North Carolina at Chapel Hill, and from 1976 to 1977, he served as both the athletic director and the head coach at Rice University. As Rice's head coach, he compiled a 4–18 record. He was the head coach of the Cincinnati Bengals of the National Football League (NFL) from 1978 to 1979. The air option offense was pioneered by Rice.

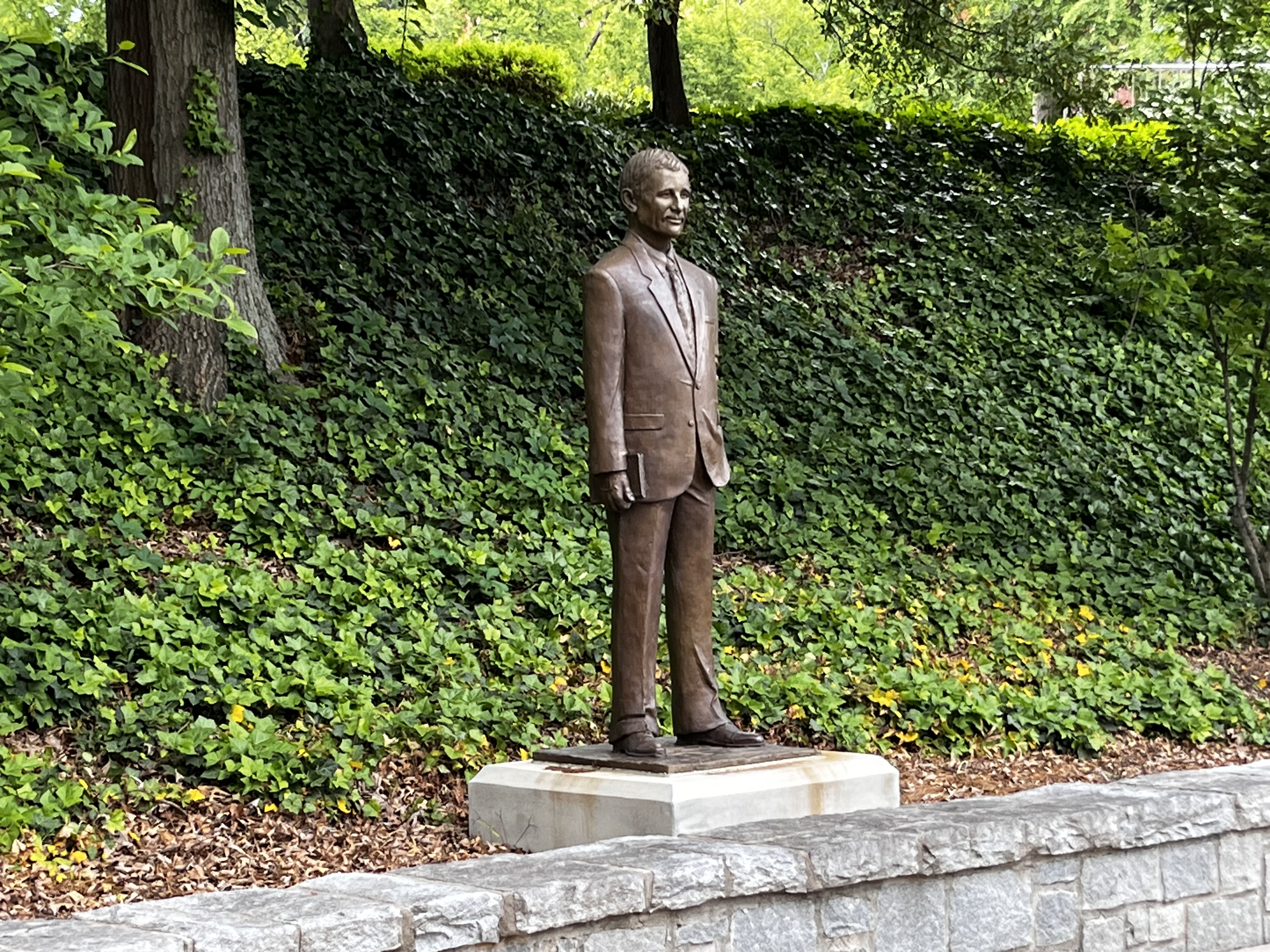
Statue at Georgia Tech honoring Homer Rice

=== Georgia Tech ===
His longest tenure as an athletic director though came at the Georgia Institute of Technology, where he served from 1980 to 1997, and was inducted into Omicron Delta Kappa. Rice joined Georgia Tech after being fired by the Cincinnati Bengals following an unsuccessful two-year stint as head coach (8-19) of that team. Upon firing Rice, Bengals General Manager Paul Brown stated, “It was rather obvious to all that a change had to be made.”

In his first year as Rice's Athletic Director, Rice and the Georgia Tech Athletic Association started the Student-Athlete Total Person Program to prepare their student-athletes for the world of collegiate sports, and beyond. The seven-pillar program focuses on personal growth, academic success, and career preparation in addition to athletic achievement. It saw great success and was soon offered to all Georgia Tech Students. Rice's Total Person Program later became the model for the NCAA's Life Skills Program, offered at over 200 colleges and universities across the United States.

Athletic success during Rice's tenure included a 1990 National Championship in football, 1990 Men's Basketball NCAA Final Four, nine consecutive appearances in the NCAA Tournament in basketball, three ACC Tournament Championships in basketball, 18 players selected in the NBA draft, 1994 College Baseball World Series runner-up, 13 consecutive NCAA appearances in baseball, six first-round selections in Major League Baseball draft, 1994 NCAA runner-up in golf, two golfers named Player of Year in the 1990s, three Olympic gold medalists in track and three Olympians in baseball, four top ten finishes in Track and 14 ACC team championships including football (1), baseball (4), basketball (3), golf (5) and volleyball (1).

Notable hires of Rice's include Bobby Ross (football), George O’Leary (football), Bobby Cremins (men's basketball), Jim Morris (baseball), Danny Hall (baseball), and Bernadette McGlade (women's basketball), who is Georgia Tech’s first full-time female coach.

=== Accolades ===
The Homer Rice Award, established by the National Association of Collegiate Directors of Athletics, is given annually to a FBS director as recognition of achievement. Rice joined John Heisman and Bobby Dodd as collegiate sport award namesakes affiliated with Georgia Tech Athletics.

A statue of Rice was unveiled on Georgia Tech's Campus outside the Homer Rice Center for Sports Performance, near the entrance to Bobby Dodd Stadium in 2021. The only other statues from Georgia Tech Athletics on the campus are John Heisman and Bobby Dodd.

== Publications and academics ==
Rice authored 7 books during his career on football, leadership, and personal success. He authored “Homer Rice on Triple Option Football” which was published in 1973 and authored “Winning Football with the Air Option Passing Game” along with Steve Moore, published in 1985. He wrote multiple books on success and leadership, authoring "Leadership for Leaders" in 1984 and “Lessons for Leaders” in 2000. “Lessons for Leaders” sold out in its first year and was followed by “Leadership Fitness: Developing and Reinforcing Successful, Positive Leaders” published in 2005.

After retiring from coaching and administration, Rice joined the teaching faculty at Georgia Tech and began teaching a class on positive leadership and success. His experiences teaching the class of juniors and seniors helped shape his book "Leadership Fitness: Developing and Reinforcing Successful, Positive Leaders". Rice taught the class as a seminar based on group discussion and invited guest speakers with high-level experience in various industries to speak and share lunch with his students. He regarded this class as the continuation of his work helping to develop students as positive leaders for the future.

== Personal life ==
Rice was born on February 20, 1927, in Bellevue, Kentucky to his parents Grace Rice and Dr. Samuel Rice and is of Cherokee heritage. His mother Grace was a second-grade school teacher, and his father Samuel was a Methodist minister. On Homer’s 12th birthday, his father gave him the book on goal setting “I Dare You”, which Rice attributed as an inspiration for his lifelong work cultivating the system for leadership and success described in his publications.

At the age of 17, Rice joined the US Navy to fight in World War II, where he served on the Pacific front in the Philippines, seeing combat and running supplies until a brush with malaria ended his time there. After the war, Homer attended college and played football at Centre College in Danville, Kentucky where he received his Ph.D. After graduation, he sold insurance while starting his coaching career at Wartburg Central High School in Tennessee, as well as coaching the local prison team in exchange for borrowing their equipment for the high school. While coaching at Wartburg Central High School, he began implementing what would later become the Total Person Program. Rice was a devout Christian and philanthropist who assisted in bringing improvements to the city of Atlanta while helping to organize the 1996 Summer Olympic Games, hosted in Atlanta and in part on the Georgia Tech campus.

Homer met his wife Phyllis when they were in grade school in 1939, and they married after World War II and college in 1950. Homer and Phyllis had three daughters, Nancy Hetherington, Phyllis Ingle, and Angela Miller as well as seven grandchildren and four great-grandchildren at the time of his death. After 64 years of marriage, his wife Phyllis died in 2013. Homer married his wife Karen in 2015, and they were married until his death in 2024.

== Death ==
Rice died June 10, 2024, at the age of 97.

== Head coaching record ==
=== College ===
Year	Team	Overall	Conference	Standing
Cincinnati Bearcats (Missouri Valley Conference) (1967–1968)
1967	Cincinnati	3–6	2–2	3rd
1968	Cincinnati	5–4–1	3–2	3rd
Cincinnati:		8–10–1	5–4	
Rice Owls (Southwest Conference) (1976–1977)
1976	Rice	3–8	2–6	T–7th
1977	Rice	1–10	0–8	9th
Rice:		4–18	2–14	
Total:		12–28–1		

=== NFL ===
Team	Year	Regular season					Postseason			
Team	Year	Won	Lost	Ties	Win %	Finish	Won	Lost	Win %	Result
CIN	1978	4	7	0	.364	4th in AFC Central	–	–	–	–
CIN	1979	4	12	0	.250	4th in AFC Central	–	–	–	–
CIN Total		8	19	0	.296		–	–	–	
Total		8	19	0	.296		–	–	–	

== Bibliography ==
- Rice, Homer (1985). Winning football with the air option passing game. West Nyack, N.Y: Parker Pub. Co. ISBN 9780139610387.
