= John J. Pershing College =

Coordinates: 40°15′39″N 96°47′22″W

John J. Pershing College was a private liberal arts college that operated from 1966 to 1971 in Beatrice, Nebraska, United States.

Pershing was one of several Midwestern colleges established by local civic leaders with the support and encouragement of Parsons College in Fairfield, Iowa. These Parsons "satellite schools" were by-products of the strong growth and apparent success of Parsons during the late 1950s and early 1960s, and all followed the "Parsons Plan" academic model developed at that school. None of the schools, however, were ultimately successful.

The "Parsons Plan" academic model employed at Pershing was the brainchild of Millard Roberts, the president of Parsons College from 1955 to 1967. The multi-faceted plan featured innovative teaching and administrative techniques, and emphasized the recruitment of a geographically and academically diverse student body. Among other characteristics, the "Parsons Plan" schools welcomed unconventional students who had not seen success at other colleges. In the 1960s, the schools were also attended by a substantial number of young men seeking draft deferments that would allow them to avoid military service during the Vietnam War.

At least initially, Pershing's reputation and fortunes were strongly tied to those of Parsons, and when Parsons faltered in the late 1960s the prospects for Pershing and the other Parsons satellite schools grew bleak. Although the satellite schools ended their relationships with Parsons, they suffered from a lack of funding, high student turnover, and accreditation issues. Ultimately, none of the "Parsons Plan" colleges became economically viable, and all closed by the mid-1970s. Pershing College ceased operating in 1971, and its former site is now occupied by the Beatrice campus of Southeast Community College.
