= Don King (coach) =

American football player and coach (born 1926)

Biographical details
- Born: February 1926 (age 100)

Playing career
- late 1940s: Modesto
- 1950–1951: Fresno State

Coaching career (HC unless noted)
- 1955–1962: Shasta (line)
- 1963–1965: Shasta
- 1966: Hawaii (assistant)
- 1967: Hawaii
- 1969–1970: Northwood (TX)

Head coaching record
- Overall: 14–17 (college); 11–15 (junior college)
- Bowls: 0–1 (junior college)

Accomplishments and honors

Championships
- 1 GVC (1965)

Don King (born February 1926) is an American former football player and coach. He served as the head coach at the University of Hawaii for one season, in 1967. King came to Hawaii in 1966 as an assistant under Phil Sarboe. From 1963 to 1965, he served as the head football coach at Shasta College, compiling a record of 11–15. King played football at Hughson Union High School in Hughson, California, Modesto Junior College, and Fresno State College.

== Head coaching record ==
Year	Team	Overall	Conference	Standing	Bowl/playoffs
Hawaii Rainbows (NCAA College Division independent) (1967)
1967	Hawaii	6–4			
Hawaii:		6–4			
Northwood Knights (NAIA Division II independent) (1969–1970)
1969	Northwood	2–8			
1970	Northwood	6–5			
Northwood:		8–13			
Total:		14–17			

=== Junior college ===
Year	Team	Overall	Conference	Standing	Bowl/playoffs
Shasta Knights (Golden Valley Conference) (1963–1965)
1963	Shasta		0–5	6th	
1964	Shasta		1–4	T–4th	
1965	Shasta	6–4	5–0	1st	L Empire Bowl
Shasta:		11–15	6–9		
Total:		11–15			
National championship Conference title Conference division title or championship game berth
