= 1967 Wichita State Shockers football team =

American college football season

1967 Wichita State Shockers football
- Conference: Missouri Valley Conference
- Record: 2–7–1 (0–4 MVC)
- Head coach: Boyd Converse (1st season)
- Home stadium: Veterans Field

1967 Missouri Valley Conference football standings
	Conf.					Overall
Team	W		L		T	W		L		T
North Texas State $	4	–	0	–	0	7	–	1	–	1
Tulsa	3	–	1	–	0	7	–	3	–	0
Cincinnati	2	–	2	–	0	3	–	6	–	0
Louisville	1	–	3	–	0	5	–	5	–	0
Wichita State	0	–	4	–	0	2	–	7	–	0
$ – Conference champion

The 1967 Wichita Shockers football team was an American football team that represented Wichita State University as a member of the Missouri Valley Conference during the 1967 NCAA University Division football season. In its first season under head coach Boyd Converse, the team compiled a 2–7–1 record (0–4 against conference opponents), finished in last place out of five teams in the MVC, and was outscored by a total of 201 to 140. The team played its home games at Veterans Field, now known as Cessna Stadium.

== Schedule ==
Date	Opponent	Site	Result	Attendance	Source
September 16	Utah State*	Veterans Field; Wichita, KS	T 3–3	11,292	
September 30	Drake*	Veterans Field; Wichita, KS	W 46–13	12,220	
October 7	at Cincinnati	Nippert Stadium; Cincinnati, OH	L 6–14	12,500	
October 14	New Mexico State*	Veterans Field; Wichita, KS	L 14–27	12,000	
October 21	at No. 10 Wyoming*	War Memorial Stadium; Laramie, WY	L 7–30	18,141	
October 28	at Louisville	Fairgrounds Stadium; Louisville, KY	L 17–24	10,000	
November 4	Tulsa	Veterans Field; Wichita, KS	L 0–14	12,803	
November 11	at North Texas State	Fouts Field; Denton, TX	L 14–20	18,900	
November 18	West Texas State*	Veterans Field; Wichita, KS	W 22–13	6,880	
November 25	at Colorado State*	Colorado Field; Fort Collins, CO	L 11–43	6,500	
*Non-conference game; Rankings from AP Poll released prior to the game
