= Fred Trosko =

American football player and coach (1917–1999)

- Trosko cropped from 1939 Michigan team photograph

Biographical details
- Born: August 16, 1917
- Died: February 6, 1999 (aged 81); Hilton Head Island, South Carolina, U.S.

Playing career
- 1937–1939: Michigan
- Position: Halfback

Coaching career (HC unless noted)
- 1946–1948: Flint Northern HS (MI) (assistant)
- 1949: Owosso HS (MI) (assistant)
- 1950–1951: Owosso HS (MI)
- 1952–1964: Michigan State Normal / Eastern Michigan

Head coaching record
- Overall: 50–56–4 (college)

Accomplishments and honors

Championships
- 3 IIAC (1954–1955, 1957)

Fred Trosko (September 5, 1917 – February 6, 1999) was an American football player and coach. He played at the halfback position for the University of Michigan football team from 1937 to 1939. He later served as the head football coach at Eastern Michigan University from 1952 to 1964.

== Flint Northern High School ==
Trosko attended Flint Northern High School where he was a star athlete in football, basketball and baseball, earning three varsity letters in each sport. In 1934, he was selected as an All-Michigan football player and broke the All-Valley Conference scoring record with 71 points (breaking his own record of 66 points set in 1933).

== University of Michigan ==
Trosko enrolled at the University of Michigan in 1936. Trosko was a multi-sport star at Michigan, earning nine letters in football, baseball and basketball. He played three years as a halfback for the Michigan Wolverines football team from 1937 to 1939. Trosko also handled place-kicking duties for the Wolverines and kicked the extra point that led Michigan to a 7–6 win over Illinois in 1937. He received the Meyer Morton Award in 1937 as the football player who showed the greatest development and most promise as a result of the annual spring practice. In 1939, he led Michigan to a 21–14 win over Ohio State when he ran 32 yards for the winning touchdown on a fake field goal attempt with 50 seconds left.

Trosko earned both bachelor's and master's degree in education from the University of Michigan.

== World War II ==
After graduating from Michigan, Trosko accepted a position as the high school baseball, basketball and football coach at Hudson, Michigan. With the entry of the United States into World War II, Trosko joined the U.S. Army Air Corps. He attained the rank of captain and served two of his five years of military service in the European Theater of Operations. While serving in Europe, he met and married his wife. He was discharged from the military in May 1946.

== High school coach ==
In 1946, Trosko was hired as an assistant football coach at his alma mater, Flint Northern High School. He served three years as an assistant coach under Guy Huston, who had been his coach in the 1930s.

In 1949, Trosko was hired as an assistant football coach at Owosso High School in Owosso, Michigan. He was promoted to head coach in 1950.

== Eastern Michigan University ==
In July 1952, Trosko was hired as head football coach at Eastern Michigan University (then known as Michigan State Normal College) in Ypsilanti, Michigan. The team improved markedly during Trosko's early years as head coach. In his first seven seasons, the team attained a record of 41–19–2, including a 7–1–1 record in 1953 and an 8–1–0 record in 1954. His teams won Interstate Intercollegiate Athletic Conference ("IIAC") championships in 1954 and 1957.

The team's success came to an abrupt end in 1959. Trosko's teams had a 29-game winless streak (0–27–2) starting with the third game of the 1959 season and continuing through the fifth game of the 1962 season. The precipitous decline followed the decision of the Eastern Michigan administration not to follow an IIAC policy that allowed member schools to award scholarships. Competing with non-scholarship athletes against conference schools with scholarship athletes, Trosko's Eastern Michigan teams were unable to compete. In August 1965, Trosko announced his resignation as the school's head football coach, and it was reported that the resignation was the result of "an apparent break with school administrators over policy."

Trosko had the second longest tenure of any head coach at the school. He also taught at Eastern Michigan and remained on the faculty at Eastern Michigan after retiring as football coach. He ultimately retired in 1981 as a professor emeritus. In 1982, he was inducted into the Eastern Michigan Sports Hall of Fame.

== Death and family ==
Trosko died at his home at Hilton Head Island, South Carolina in February 1999. He was survived by his wife of 53 years, Leona, a daughter, Maureen, a son, Fred Trosko, Jr., and five grandchildren.

== Head coaching record ==
=== College ===
Year	Team	Overall	Conference	Standing	Bowl/playoffs
Michigan State Normal / Eastern Michigan Hurons (Interstate Intercollegiate Athletic Conference) (1952–1961)
1952	Michigan State Normal	5–3–1	3–2–1	3rd	
1953	Michigan State Normal	7–1–1	4–1–1	3rd	
1954	Michigan State Normal	8–1	5–1	T–1st	
1955	Michigan State Normal	7–2	5–1	T–1st	
1956	Eastern Michigan	4–4	3–3	T–3rd	
1957	Eastern Michigan	6–3	6–0	1st	
1958	Eastern Michigan	4–5	3–3	4th	
1959	Eastern Michigan	1–7	1–5	7th	
1960	Eastern Michigan	0–8–1	0–5–1	7th	
1961	Eastern Michigan	0–8–1	0–6	7th	
Eastern Michigan Hurons (NCAA College Division independent) (1962–1963)
1962	Eastern Michigan	2–5			
1963	Eastern Michigan	2–6			
Eastern Michigan Hurons (Presidents' Athletic Conference) (1964)
1964	Eastern Michigan	4–3	3–2	3rd	
Eastern Michigan:		50–56–4	33–29–3		
Total:		50–56–4			
National championship Conference title Conference division title or championship game berth
