= 1967 Boston University Terriers football team =

American college football season

1967 Boston University Terriers football
- Conference: Independent
- Record: 3–6
- Head coach: Warren Schmakel (4th season)
- Home stadium: Nickerson Field

1967 NCAA College Division independents football records
	Conf.			Overall
Team	W	L	T	W		L		T
Ashland		–		8	–	0	–	1
Northern Michigan		–		9	–	1	–	0
Indiana (PA)		–		8	–	1	–	0
Santa Clara		–		8	–	1	–	0
Northeastern		–		7	–	1	–	0
Wheaton (IL)		–		7	–	2	–	0
Samford		–		8	–	2	–	1
Wayne State (MI)		–		6	–	2	–	0
Chattanooga		–		7	–	3	–	0
Eastern Michigan		–		6	–	3	–	0
Tennessee A&I		–		6	–	3	–	0
Parsons		–		6	–	3	–	1
Kentucky State		–		5	–	3	–	1
Hawaii		–		6	–	4	–	0
St. Norbert		–		5	–	4	–	0
Akron		–		4	–	4	–	1
Carnegie Mellon		–		4	–	4	–	0
Cortland		–		4	–	4	–	0
Northern Arizona		–		5	–	5	–	0
Northern Illinois		–		5	–	5	–	0
UC Riverside		–		4	–	4	–	1
UC Santa Barbara		–		5	–	5	–	0
Drake		–		4	–	5	–	0
Pacific (CA)		–		4	–	5	–	0
Portland State		–		4	–	6	–	0
Lincoln (MO)		–		3	–	5	–	0
Boston University		–		3	–	6	–	0
Lake Forest		–		3	–	6	–	0
Milwaukee		–		3	–	6	–	0
Southern Illinois		–		3	–	7	–	0
Colorado College		–		2	–	5	–	1
Rose Poly		–		1	–	6	–	2
Tampa		–		2	–	7	–	0
Wabash		–		2	–	7	–	0
Cal Poly Pomona		–		2	–	8	–	0
Mississippi Valley State		–		1	–	8	–	0

The 1967 Boston University Terriers football team was an American football team that represented Boston University as an independent during the 1967 NCAA College Division football season. In its fourth season under head coach Warren Schmakel, the team compiled a 3–6 record and was outscored by a total of 151 to 114.

== Schedule ==
Date	Opponent	Site	Result	Attendance	Source
September 16	Bucknell	Nickerson Field; Boston, MA	W 20–16	8,000	
September 23	at Colgate	Andy Kerr Stadium; Hamilton, NY	W 20–14	6,500	
September 30	at Temple	Temple Stadium; Philadelphia, PA	L 16–22	10,000	
October 7	at Harvard	Harvard Stadium; Boston, MA	L 14–29	31,621	
October 14	at Buffalo	Rotary Field; Buffalo, NY	L 0–6	8,573	
October 21	at Holy Cross	Fitton Field; Worcester, MA	L 17–21	12,912	
October 28	UMass	Nickerson Field; Boston, MA	L 0–24	10,000	
November 4	Rhode Island	Nickerson Field; Boston, MA	L 6–7	4,000	
November 11	Connecticut	Nickerson Field; Boston, MA	W 21–12	4,000	
