= 1967 Tennessee A&I Tigers football team =

American college football season

1967 Tennessee A&I Tigers football
- Conference: Independent
- Record: 6–3
- Head coach: John Merritt (5th season)
- Home stadium: Hale Stadium

1967 NCAA College Division independents football records
	Conf.			Overall
Team	W	L	T	W		L		T
Ashland		–		8	–	0	–	1
Northern Michigan		–		9	–	1	–	0
Indiana (PA)		–		8	–	1	–	0
Santa Clara		–		8	–	1	–	0
Northeastern		–		7	–	1	–	0
Wheaton (IL)		–		7	–	2	–	0
Samford		–		8	–	2	–	1
Wayne State (MI)		–		6	–	2	–	0
Chattanooga		–		7	–	3	–	0
Eastern Michigan		–		6	–	3	–	0
Tennessee A&I		–		6	–	3	–	0
Parsons		–		6	–	3	–	1
Kentucky State		–		5	–	3	–	1
Hawaii		–		6	–	4	–	0
St. Norbert		–		5	–	4	–	0
Akron		–		4	–	4	–	1
Carnegie Mellon		–		4	–	4	–	0
Cortland		–		4	–	4	–	0
Northern Arizona		–		5	–	5	–	0
Northern Illinois		–		5	–	5	–	0
UC Riverside		–		4	–	4	–	1
UC Santa Barbara		–		5	–	5	–	0
Drake		–		4	–	5	–	0
Pacific (CA)		–		4	–	5	–	0
Portland State		–		4	–	6	–	0
Lincoln (MO)		–		3	–	5	–	0
Boston University		–		3	–	6	–	0
Lake Forest		–		3	–	6	–	0
Milwaukee		–		3	–	6	–	0
Southern Illinois		–		3	–	7	–	0
Colorado College		–		2	–	5	–	1
Rose Poly		–		1	–	6	–	2
Tampa		–		2	–	7	–	0
Wabash		–		2	–	7	–	0
Cal Poly Pomona		–		2	–	8	–	0
Mississippi Valley State		–		1	–	8	–	0

The 1967 Tennessee A&I Tigers football team represented Tennessee Agricultural & Industrial State College (now known as Tennessee State University) as an independent during the 1967 NCAA College Division football season. Led by fifth-year head coach John Merritt, the Tigers compiled an overall record of 6–3.

== Schedule ==
Date	Opponent	Site	Result	Attendance	Source
September 15	at San Diego State	San Diego Stadium; San Diego, CA	L 8–16	45,296	
September 23	North Carolina A&T	Hale Stadium; Nashville, TN	W 35–0		
September 30	at Texas Southern	Jeppesen Stadium; Houston, TX	L 10–14		
October 7	Grambling	Hale Stadium; Nashville, TN	L 24–26		
October 21	Florida A&M	Hale Stadium; Nashville, TN	W 32–8		
October 28	at Southern	University Stadium; Baton Rouge, LA	W 27–16		
November 3	at Morris Brown	Herndon Stadium; Atlanta, GA	W 34–0	4,500	
November 18	at Kentucky State	Alumni Field; Frankfort, KY	W 13–0	3,200	
November 23	Allen (SC)^{†}	Hale Stadium; Nashville, TN	W 67–0	7,000	
^{†}Homecoming
