= 1967 Akron Zips football team =

American college football season

1967 Akron Zips football
- Conference: Independent
- Record: 4–4–1
- Head coach: Gordon K. Larson (7th season)
- Captain: Jon Denholm; Craig Hartz; Charlie Marquess
- Home stadium: Rubber Bowl

1967 NCAA College Division independents football records
	Conf.			Overall
Team	W	L	T	W		L		T
Ashland		–		8	–	0	–	1
Northern Michigan		–		9	–	1	–	0
Indiana (PA)		–		8	–	1	–	0
Santa Clara		–		8	–	1	–	0
Northeastern		–		7	–	1	–	0
Wheaton (IL)		–		7	–	2	–	0
Samford		–		8	–	2	–	1
Wayne State (MI)		–		6	–	2	–	0
Chattanooga		–		7	–	3	–	0
Eastern Michigan		–		6	–	3	–	0
Tennessee A&I		–		6	–	3	–	0
Parsons		–		6	–	3	–	1
Kentucky State		–		5	–	3	–	1
Hawaii		–		6	–	4	–	0
St. Norbert		–		5	–	4	–	0
Akron		–		4	–	4	–	1
Carnegie Mellon		–		4	–	4	–	0
Cortland		–		4	–	4	–	0
Northern Arizona		–		5	–	5	–	0
Northern Illinois		–		5	–	5	–	0
UC Riverside		–		4	–	4	–	1
UC Santa Barbara		–		5	–	5	–	0
Drake		–		4	–	5	–	0
Pacific (CA)		–		4	–	5	–	0
Portland State		–		4	–	6	–	0
Lincoln (MO)		–		3	–	5	–	0
Boston University		–		3	–	6	–	0
Lake Forest		–		3	–	6	–	0
Milwaukee		–		3	–	6	–	0
Southern Illinois		–		3	–	7	–	0
Colorado College		–		2	–	5	–	1
Rose Poly		–		1	–	6	–	2
Tampa		–		2	–	7	–	0
Wabash		–		2	–	7	–	0
Cal Poly Pomona		–		2	–	8	–	0
Mississippi Valley State		–		1	–	8	–	0

The 1967 Akron Zips football team represented Akron University in the 1967 NCAA College Division football season as an independent. Led by seventh-year head coach Gordon K. Larson, the Zips played their home games at the Rubber Bowl in Akron, Ohio. They finished the season with a record of 4–4–1 and outscored their opponents 162–155.

== Schedule ==
Date	Opponent	Site	Result	Attendance	Source
September 16	at Northern Michigan	Memorial Field; Marquette, MI	L 17–34	6,000	
September 23	Tampa	Rubber Bowl; Akron, OH	W 6–0	38,267	
September 30	Quantico Marines	Rubber Bowl; Akron, OH	W 20–0	5,700	
October 7	Youngstown State	Rubber Bowl; Akron, OH (Steel Tire)	W 19–12	4,108	
October 21	at Baldwin–Wallace	Ray E. Watts Stadium; Berea, OH	T 23–23	8,106	
October 28	vs. Bradley	Clifford Stadium; Cuyahoga Falls, OH	W 42–12	4,752	
November 4	at VMI	Alumni Memorial Field; Lexington, VA	L 14–38	4,800	
November 11	at Wittenberg	Wittenberg Stadium; Springfield, OH	L 0–14	4,000	
November 18	at Temple	Temple Stadium; Philadelphia, PA	L 21–22	5,000	
Rankings from AP Poll released prior to the game
