= 1967 Chattanooga Moccasins football team =

American college football season

1967 Chattanooga Moccasins football
- Conference: Independent
- Record: 7–3
- Head coach: Scrappy Moore (37th season)
- Home stadium: Chamberlain Field

1967 NCAA College Division independents football records
	Conf.			Overall
Team	W	L	T	W		L		T
Ashland		–		8	–	0	–	1
Northern Michigan		–		9	–	1	–	0
Indiana (PA)		–		8	–	1	–	0
Santa Clara		–		8	–	1	–	0
Northeastern		–		7	–	1	–	0
Wheaton (IL)		–		7	–	2	–	0
Samford		–		8	–	2	–	1
Wayne State (MI)		–		6	–	2	–	0
Chattanooga		–		7	–	3	–	0
Eastern Michigan		–		6	–	3	–	0
Tennessee A&I		–		6	–	3	–	0
Parsons		–		6	–	3	–	1
Kentucky State		–		5	–	3	–	1
Hawaii		–		6	–	4	–	0
St. Norbert		–		5	–	4	–	0
Akron		–		4	–	4	–	1
Carnegie Mellon		–		4	–	4	–	0
Cortland		–		4	–	4	–	0
Northern Arizona		–		5	–	5	–	0
Northern Illinois		–		5	–	5	–	0
UC Riverside		–		4	–	4	–	1
UC Santa Barbara		–		5	–	5	–	0
Drake		–		4	–	5	–	0
Pacific (CA)		–		4	–	5	–	0
Portland State		–		4	–	6	–	0
Lincoln (MO)		–		3	–	5	–	0
Boston University		–		3	–	6	–	0
Lake Forest		–		3	–	6	–	0
Milwaukee		–		3	–	6	–	0
Southern Illinois		–		3	–	7	–	0
Colorado College		–		2	–	5	–	1
Rose Poly		–		1	–	6	–	2
Tampa		–		2	–	7	–	0
Wabash		–		2	–	7	–	0
Cal Poly Pomona		–		2	–	8	–	0
Mississippi Valley State		–		1	–	8	–	0

The 1967 Chattanooga Moccasins football team was an American football team that represented the University of Chattanooga (now known as the University of Tennessee at Chattanooga) during the 1967 NCAA College Division football season. In their 37th year under head coach Scrappy Moore, the team compiled a 7–3 record.

== Schedule ==
Date	Opponent	Site	Result	Attendance	Source
September 16	Austin Peay	Chamberlain Field; Chattanooga, TN	W 23–8	10,500	
September 23	at Auburn	Cliff Hare Stadium; Auburn, AL	L 6–40	20,573–27,000	
September 30	at Middle Tennessee	Horace Jones Field; Murfreesboro, TN	W 30–13	8,999–10,000	
October 7	Northeast Louisiana State	Chamberlain Field; Chattanooga, TN	W 21–14	8,000	
October 14	at East Tennessee State	University Stadium; Johnson City, TN	W 15–14	5,000	
October 21	Xavier	Chamberlain Field; Chattanooga, TN	L 28–40	10,500–11,500	
October 28	Tennessee Tech^{†}	Chamberlain Field; Chattanooga, TN	W 28–13	9,000	
November 4	at Samford	Seibert Stadium; Homewood, AL	W 28–0	5,200	
November 11	at Tampa	Tampa Stadium; Tampa, FL	L 16–20	9,500	
November 18	Jacksonville State	Chamberlain Field; Chattanooga, TN	W 51–0	6,500	
^{†}Homecoming
