= Lloyd Pate =

American football player (born 1946)

No. 33
- Position: Running back

Personal information
- Born: March 11, 1946 (age 80); Columbus, Ohio, U.S.
- Listed height: 6 ft 1 in (1.85 m)
- Listed weight: 205 lb (93 kg)

Career information
- High school: South (Columbus)
- College: Cincinnati (1965-1968)
- NFL draft: 1969: 12th round, 287th overall pick

Career history
- Buffalo Bills (1969-1970)

Career NFL statistics
- Rushing yards: 162
- Rushing average: 3.5
- Receptions: 19
- Receiving yards: 103
- Total touchdowns: 1
- Stats at Pro Football Reference

Lloyd Pate (born March 11, 1946) is an American former professional football player who was a running backfor the Buffalo Bills of the American Football League (AFL) in 1970. He played college football for the Cincinnati Bearcats.
