= 1967 UC Santa Barbara Gauchos football team =

American college football season

1967 UC Santa Barbara Gauchos football
- Conference: Independent
- Record: 5–5
- Head coach: Jack Curtice (5th season)
- Home stadium: Campus Stadium

1967 NCAA College Division independents football records
	Conf.			Overall
Team	W	L	T	W		L		T
Ashland		–		8	–	0	–	1
Northern Michigan		–		9	–	1	–	0
Indiana (PA)		–		8	–	1	–	0
Santa Clara		–		8	–	1	–	0
Northeastern		–		7	–	1	–	0
Wheaton (IL)		–		7	–	2	–	0
Samford		–		8	–	2	–	1
Wayne State (MI)		–		6	–	2	–	0
Chattanooga		–		7	–	3	–	0
Eastern Michigan		–		6	–	3	–	0
Tennessee A&I		–		6	–	3	–	0
Parsons		–		6	–	3	–	1
Kentucky State		–		5	–	3	–	1
Hawaii		–		6	–	4	–	0
St. Norbert		–		5	–	4	–	0
Akron		–		4	–	4	–	1
Carnegie Mellon		–		4	–	4	–	0
Cortland		–		4	–	4	–	0
Northern Arizona		–		5	–	5	–	0
Northern Illinois		–		5	–	5	–	0
UC Riverside		–		4	–	4	–	1
UC Santa Barbara		–		5	–	5	–	0
Drake		–		4	–	5	–	0
Pacific (CA)		–		4	–	5	–	0
Portland State		–		4	–	6	–	0
Lincoln (MO)		–		3	–	5	–	0
Boston University		–		3	–	6	–	0
Lake Forest		–		3	–	6	–	0
Milwaukee		–		3	–	6	–	0
Mississippi Valley State		–		3	–	6	–	0
Southern Illinois		–		3	–	7	–	0
Colorado College		–		2	–	5	–	1
Rose Poly		–		1	–	6	–	2
Tampa		–		2	–	7	–	0
Wabash		–		2	–	7	–	0
Cal Poly Pomona		–		2	–	8	–	0

The 1967 UC Santa Barbara Gauchos football team represented the University of California, Santa Barbara (UCSB) as an independent during the 1967 NCAA College Division football season. Led by fifth-year head coach Jack Curtice, the Gauchos compiled a record of 5–5 and outscored their opponents 230 to 205. The team played home games at Campus Stadium in Santa Barbara, California.

== Schedule ==
Date	Opponent	Site	Result	Attendance	Source
September 16	at UTEP	Sun Bowl; El Paso, TX	L 14–50	29,642	
September 23	Pacific (CA)	Campus Stadium; Santa Barbara, CA	W 24–20	8,000	
September 30	Nevada	Campus Stadium; Santa Barbara, CA	W 34–7	7,135	
October 7	at Whittier	Hadley Field; Whittier, CA	W 21–0	1,200	
October 14	Long Beach State	Campus Stadium; Santa Barbara, CA	L 24–34	7,200	
October 21	at Cal Poly Pomona	Kellogg Field; Pomona, CA	W 31–14	1,000–2,500	
October 28	Valley State	Campus Stadium; Santa Barbara, CA	L 27–28	6,500	
November 11	at Hawaii	Honolulu Stadium; Honolulu, HI	L 7–15	17,500–18,000	
November 18	Santa Clara^{†}	Campus Stadium; Santa Barbara, CA	W 34–7	9,500	
November 25	at Cal Poly	Mustang Stadium; San Luis Obispo, CA	L 14–30	2,500	
^{†}Homecoming

== Team players in the NFL ==
The following Santa Barbara Gaucho players were selected in the 1968 NFL/AFL draft.

Player	Position	Round	Overall	NFL team
Dave Zivich	Tackle	14	365	Washington Redskins
