= 1967 Northern Illinois Huskies football team =

American college football season

1967 Northern Illinois Huskies football
- Conference: Independent
- Record: 5–5
- Head coach: Howard Fletcher (12th season)
- Offensive coordinator: Bill Peck (3rd season)
- MVP: Jim Hering
- Captains: Jack Frost; Eugene Johnston
- Home stadium: Huskie Stadium

1967 NCAA College Division independents football records
	Conf.			Overall
Team	W	L	T	W		L		T
Ashland		–		8	–	0	–	1
Northern Michigan		–		9	–	1	–	0
Indiana (PA)		–		8	–	1	–	0
Santa Clara		–		8	–	1	–	0
Northeastern		–		7	–	1	–	0
Wheaton (IL)		–		7	–	2	–	0
Samford		–		8	–	2	–	1
Wayne State (MI)		–		6	–	2	–	0
Chattanooga		–		7	–	3	–	0
Eastern Michigan		–		6	–	3	–	0
Tennessee A&I		–		6	–	3	–	0
Parsons		–		6	–	3	–	1
Kentucky State		–		5	–	3	–	1
Hawaii		–		6	–	4	–	0
St. Norbert		–		5	–	4	–	0
Akron		–		4	–	4	–	1
Carnegie Mellon		–		4	–	4	–	0
Cortland		–		4	–	4	–	0
Northern Arizona		–		5	–	5	–	0
Northern Illinois		–		5	–	5	–	0
UC Riverside		–		4	–	4	–	1
UC Santa Barbara		–		5	–	5	–	0
Drake		–		4	–	5	–	0
Pacific (CA)		–		4	–	5	–	0
Portland State		–		4	–	6	–	0
Lincoln (MO)		–		3	–	5	–	0
Boston University		–		3	–	6	–	0
Lake Forest		–		3	–	6	–	0
Milwaukee		–		3	–	6	–	0
Mississippi Valley State		–		3	–	6	–	0
Southern Illinois		–		3	–	7	–	0
Colorado College		–		2	–	5	–	1
Rose Poly		–		1	–	6	–	2
Tampa		–		2	–	7	–	0
Wabash		–		2	–	7	–	0
Cal Poly Pomona		–		2	–	8	–	0

The 1967 Northern Illinois Huskies football team represented Northern Illinois University as independent during the 1967 NCAA College Division football season. Led by 12th-year head coach Howard Fletcher, the Huskies compiled a record of 5–5. Northern Illinois played home games at Huskie Stadium in DeKalb, Illinois.

== Schedule ==
Date	Opponent	Site	Result	Attendance	Source
September 16	at Butler	Butler Bowl; Indianapolis, IN	W 24–7	4,400	
September 23	at Kent State	Memorial Stadium; Kent, OH	L 0–35	14,100	
September 30	Indiana State	Huskie Stadium; DeKalb, IL	W 34–0	18,057	
October 7	Ball State	Huskie Stadium; DeKalb, IL (rivalry)	W 28–14	12,527	
October 14	at Bradley	Peoria, IL	W 29–12	6,724–8,354	
October 21	San Diego State	Huskie Stadium; DeKalb, IL	L 6–47	12,537	
October 28	Hillsdale^{†}	Huskie Stadium; DeKalb, IL	W 24–14	16,834	
November 4	West Texas State	Huskie Stadium; DeKalb, IL	L 10–17	16,737	
November 11	at Toledo	Glass Bowl; Toledo, OH	L 0–35	8,810	
November 18	at Bowling Green	Doyt Perry Stadium; Bowling Green, OH	L 7–17	7,297	
^{†}Homecoming
