= 1967 Northern Arizona Lumberjacks football team =

American college football season

1967 Northern Arizona Lumberjacks football
- Conference: Independent
- Record: 5–5
- Head coach: Andy MacDonald (3rd season)
- Home stadium: Lumberjack Stadium

1967 NCAA College Division independents football records
	Conf.			Overall
Team	W	L	T	W		L		T
Ashland		–		8	–	0	–	1
Northern Michigan		–		9	–	1	–	0
Indiana (PA)		–		8	–	1	–	0
Santa Clara		–		8	–	1	–	0
Northeastern		–		7	–	1	–	0
Wheaton (IL)		–		7	–	2	–	0
Samford		–		8	–	2	–	1
Wayne State (MI)		–		6	–	2	–	0
Chattanooga		–		7	–	3	–	0
Eastern Michigan		–		6	–	3	–	0
Tennessee A&I		–		6	–	3	–	0
Parsons		–		6	–	3	–	1
Kentucky State		–		5	–	3	–	1
Hawaii		–		6	–	4	–	0
St. Norbert		–		5	–	4	–	0
Akron		–		4	–	4	–	1
Carnegie Mellon		–		4	–	4	–	0
Cortland		–		4	–	4	–	0
Northern Arizona		–		5	–	5	–	0
Northern Illinois		–		5	–	5	–	0
UC Riverside		–		4	–	4	–	1
UC Santa Barbara		–		5	–	5	–	0
Drake		–		4	–	5	–	0
Pacific (CA)		–		4	–	5	–	0
Portland State		–		4	–	6	–	0
Lincoln (MO)		–		3	–	5	–	0
Boston University		–		3	–	6	–	0
Lake Forest		–		3	–	6	–	0
Milwaukee		–		3	–	6	–	0
Mississippi Valley State		–		3	–	6	–	0
Southern Illinois		–		3	–	7	–	0
Colorado College		–		2	–	5	–	1
Rose Poly		–		1	–	6	–	2
Tampa		–		2	–	7	–	0
Wabash		–		2	–	7	–	0
Cal Poly Pomona		–		2	–	8	–	0

The 1967 Northern Arizona Lumberjacks football team represented Northern Arizona University as an independent during the 1967 NCAA College Division football season. Led by third-year head coach Andy MacDonald, the Lumberjacks compiled an overall record of 5–5.

== Schedule ==
Date	Opponent	Rank	Site	Result	Attendance	Source
September 9	North Dakota		Lumberjack Stadium; Flagstaff, AZ	W 39–10	5,100–6,300	
September 16	at Weber State		Wildcat Stadium; Ogden, UT	L 28–29	13,186	
September 23	Eastern New Mexico		Lumberjack Stadium; Flagstaff, AZ	L 0–7	7,000	
September 30	at Whittier		Hadley Field; Whittier, CA	W 46–29		
October 7	Omaha^{†}		Lumberjack Stadium; Flagstaff, AZ	W 41–13		
October 14	Western Illinois		Lumberjack Stadium; Flagstaff, AZ	W 34–0		
October 20	at Long Beach State	No. 8	Veterans Memorial Stadium; Long Beach, CA	W 26–21	5,500	
October 28	at Montana	No. 8	Dornblaser Field; Missoula, MT	L 7–10	6,500	
November 4	East Central		Lumberjack Stadium; Flagstaff, AZ	L 7–13		
November 11	at New Mexico State		Memorial Stadium; Las Cruces, NM	L 0–90	10,000	
^{†}Homecoming; Rankings from AP Poll released prior to the game
