= 1967 Tampa Spartans football team =

American college football season

1967 Tampa Spartans football
- Conference: Independent
- Record: 2–7
- Head coach: Sam Bailey (4th season)
- Home stadium: Phillips Field; Tampa Stadium

1967 NCAA College Division independents football records
	Conf.			Overall
Team	W	L	T	W		L		T
Ashland		–		8	–	0	–	1
Northern Michigan		–		9	–	1	–	0
Indiana (PA)		–		8	–	1	–	0
Santa Clara		–		8	–	1	–	0
Northeastern		–		7	–	1	–	0
Wheaton (IL)		–		7	–	2	–	0
Samford		–		8	–	2	–	1
Wayne State (MI)		–		6	–	2	–	0
Chattanooga		–		7	–	3	–	0
Eastern Michigan		–		6	–	3	–	0
Tennessee A&I		–		6	–	3	–	0
Parsons		–		6	–	3	–	1
Kentucky State		–		5	–	3	–	1
Hawaii		–		6	–	4	–	0
St. Norbert		–		5	–	4	–	0
Akron		–		4	–	4	–	1
Carnegie Mellon		–		4	–	4	–	0
Cortland		–		4	–	4	–	0
Northern Arizona		–		5	–	5	–	0
Northern Illinois		–		5	–	5	–	0
UC Riverside		–		4	–	4	–	1
UC Santa Barbara		–		5	–	5	–	0
Drake		–		4	–	5	–	0
Pacific (CA)		–		4	–	5	–	0
Portland State		–		4	–	6	–	0
Lincoln (MO)		–		3	–	5	–	0
Boston University		–		3	–	6	–	0
Lake Forest		–		3	–	6	–	0
Milwaukee		–		3	–	6	–	0
Mississippi Valley State		–		3	–	6	–	0
Southern Illinois		–		3	–	7	–	0
Colorado College		–		2	–	5	–	1
Rose Poly		–		1	–	6	–	2
Tampa		–		2	–	7	–	0
Wabash		–		2	–	7	–	0
Cal Poly Pomona		–		2	–	8	–	0

The 1967 Tampa Spartans football team represented the University of Tampa in the 1967 NCAA College Division football season. It was the Spartans' 31st season. The team was led by head coach Sam Bailey, in his fourth year, and played their home games at Phillips Field for their first two home games and then at Tampa Stadium for their final five home games in Tampa, Florida. They finished with a record of two wins and seven losses (2–7). The 1967 season is noted for the dedication of Tampa Stadium in the Spartans' 38–0 loss against Tennessee.

== Schedule ==
Date	Opponent	Site	Result	Attendance	Source
September 16	Virginia Tech	Phillips Field; Tampa, FL	L 3–13	10,000	
September 23	at Akron	Rubber Bowl; Akron, OH	L 0–6	38,267	
October 7	at Southern Miss	Faulkner Field; Hattiesburg, MS	L 0–48	9,000	
October 14	at Tulsa	Skelly Stadium; Tulsa, OK	L 0–77	21,500	
October 21	Furman	Phillips Field; Tampa, FL	W 39–13	8,000	
November 4	No. 3 Tennessee	Tampa Stadium; Tampa, FL	L 0–38	26,500	
November 11	Chattanooga	Tampa Stadium; Tampa, FL	W 20–16	9,500	
November 18	South Dakota State^{†}	Tampa Stadium; Tampa, FL	L 7–14	9,200	
November 24	Indiana State	Tampa Stadium; Tampa, FL	L 7–9	7,000	
^{†}Homecoming; Rankings from AP Poll released prior to the game
