= 1967 UC Riverside Highlanders football team =

American college football season

1967 UC Riverside Highlanders football
- Conference: Independent
- Record: 4–4–1
- Head coach: Pete Kettela (3rd season)
- Home stadium: Highlander Stadium

1967 NCAA College Division independents football records
	Conf.			Overall
Team	W	L	T	W		L		T
Ashland		–		8	–	0	–	1
Northern Michigan		–		9	–	1	–	0
Indiana (PA)		–		8	–	1	–	0
Santa Clara		–		8	–	1	–	0
Northeastern		–		7	–	1	–	0
Wheaton (IL)		–		7	–	2	–	0
Samford		–		8	–	2	–	1
Wayne State (MI)		–		6	–	2	–	0
Chattanooga		–		7	–	3	–	0
Eastern Michigan		–		6	–	3	–	0
Tennessee A&I		–		6	–	3	–	0
Parsons		–		6	–	3	–	1
Kentucky State		–		5	–	3	–	1
Hawaii		–		6	–	4	–	0
St. Norbert		–		5	–	4	–	0
Akron		–		4	–	4	–	1
Carnegie Mellon		–		4	–	4	–	0
Cortland		–		4	–	4	–	0
Northern Arizona		–		5	–	5	–	0
Northern Illinois		–		5	–	5	–	0
UC Riverside		–		4	–	4	–	1
UC Santa Barbara		–		5	–	5	–	0
Drake		–		4	–	5	–	0
Pacific (CA)		–		4	–	5	–	0
Portland State		–		4	–	6	–	0
Lincoln (MO)		–		3	–	5	–	0
Boston University		–		3	–	6	–	0
Lake Forest		–		3	–	6	–	0
Milwaukee		–		3	–	6	–	0
Mississippi Valley State		–		3	–	6	–	0
Southern Illinois		–		3	–	7	–	0
Colorado College		–		2	–	5	–	1
Rose Poly		–		1	–	6	–	2
Tampa		–		2	–	7	–	0
Wabash		–		2	–	7	–	0
Cal Poly Pomona		–		2	–	8	–	0

The 1967 UC Riverside Highlanders football team represented the University of California, Riverside as an independent during the 1967 NCAA College Division football season. Led by third-year head coach Pete Kettela, UC Riverside compiled a record of 4–4–1. The team was outscored by its opponents 180 to 169 for the season. The Highlanders played home games at Highlander Stadium in Riverside, California.

== Schedule ==
Date	Opponent	Site	Result	Attendance	Source
September 23	UC Davis	Highlander Stadium; Riverside, CA	L 6–19	2,000–3,200	
September 30	La Verne	Highlander Stadium; Riverside, CA	L 7–27	3,000	
October 7	at San Francisco	Kezar Stadium; San Francisco, CA	L 7–28	3,900	
October 14	Redlands	Highlander Stadium; Riverside, CA	L 14–27	3,500	
October 21	at Claremont-Mudd	Fritz B. Burns Stadium; Claremont, CA	W 20–7	1,500	
October 28	at Pomona	Claremont Alumni Field; Claremont, CA	W 40–27	3,100	
November 4	Caltech	Highlander Stadium; Riverside, CA	W 28–14	1,500	
November 11	at Azusa Pacific	Citrus Stadium; Azusa, CA	T 21–21	1,500	
November 18	Coast Guard	Highlander Stadium; Riverside, CA	W 26–10	3,500	
