= 1967 Pacific Tigers football team =

American college football season

1967 Pacific Tigers football
- Conference: Independent
- Record: 4–5
- Head coach: Doug Scovil (2nd season)
- Home stadium: Pacific Memorial Stadium

1967 NCAA College Division independents football records
	Conf.			Overall
Team	W	L	T	W		L		T
Ashland		–		8	–	0	–	1
Northern Michigan		–		9	–	1	–	0
Indiana (PA)		–		8	–	1	–	0
Santa Clara		–		8	–	1	–	0
Northeastern		–		7	–	1	–	0
Wheaton (IL)		–		7	–	2	–	0
Samford		–		8	–	2	–	1
Wayne State (MI)		–		6	–	2	–	0
Chattanooga		–		7	–	3	–	0
Eastern Michigan		–		6	–	3	–	0
Tennessee A&I		–		6	–	3	–	0
Parsons		–		6	–	3	–	1
Kentucky State		–		5	–	3	–	1
Hawaii		–		6	–	4	–	0
St. Norbert		–		5	–	4	–	0
Akron		–		4	–	4	–	1
Carnegie Mellon		–		4	–	4	–	0
Cortland		–		4	–	4	–	0
Northern Arizona		–		5	–	5	–	0
Northern Illinois		–		5	–	5	–	0
UC Riverside		–		4	–	4	–	1
UC Santa Barbara		–		5	–	5	–	0
Drake		–		4	–	5	–	0
Pacific (CA)		–		4	–	5	–	0
Portland State		–		4	–	6	–	0
Lincoln (MO)		–		3	–	5	–	0
Boston University		–		3	–	6	–	0
Lake Forest		–		3	–	6	–	0
Milwaukee		–		3	–	6	–	0
Mississippi Valley State		–		3	–	6	–	0
Southern Illinois		–		3	–	7	–	0
Colorado College		–		2	–	5	–	1
Rose Poly		–		1	–	6	–	2
Tampa		–		2	–	7	–	0
Wabash		–		2	–	7	–	0
Cal Poly Pomona		–		2	–	8	–	0

The 1967 Pacific Tigers football team represented the University of the Pacific (UOP) as an independent during the 1967 NCAA College Division football season. Led by second -year head coach Doug Scovil, the Tigers compiled a record of 4–5 and outscored opponents 201 to 158. The team played home games at Pacific Memorial Stadium in Stockton, California.

== Schedule ==
Date	Opponent	Site	Result	Attendance	Source
September 16	Idaho	Pacific Memorial Stadium; Stockton, CA	W 43–6	10,000	
September 23	at UC Santa Barbara	Campus Stadium; Santa Barbara, CA	L 20–24	8,000	
September 30	at West Texas State	Buffalo Bowl; Canyon, TX	L 6–34	10,000	
October 7	at Montana	Dornblaser Field (Note: There were two stadiums named Dornblaser Field built to host Montana football games. This is the original stadium, built in 1912 and replaced in 1978.); Missoula, MT	L 7–21	7,000–7,800	
October 14	at Utah State	Romney Stadium (Note: This stadium is the predecessor to the current Maverik Stadium (Romney Stadium) that has served as the home of the Aggies since 1968.); Logan, UT	L 6–7	14,662	
October 28	at San Jose State	Spartan Stadium; San Jose, CA (Victory Bell)	W 34–14	13,300	
November 4	Colorado State	Pacific Memorial Stadium; Stockton, CA	L 15–24	8,000	
November 11	Fresno State	Pacific Memorial Stadium; Stockton, CA	W 32–20	10,550–10,580	
November 18	Long Beach State	Pacific Memorial Stadium; Stockton, CA	W 39–8	5,000	

== NFL/AFL draft ==
Two Tigers were selected in the 1968 NFL/AFL draft.

Player	Position	Round	Overall	Franchise
Mark Nordquist	Guard – Center	5	124	Philadelphia Eagles
Bob Lee	Quarterback – Punter	17	441	Minnesota Vikings
