= 1967 Hawaii Rainbows football team =

American college football season

1967 Hawaii Rainbows football
- Conference: Independent
- Record: 6–4
- Head coach: Don King (1st season)
- Home stadium: Honolulu Stadium

1967 NCAA College Division independents football records
| | Conf. | | | Overall |
| Team | W | L | T | W | | L | | T |
|---|---|---|---|---|---|---|---|---|
| Ashland | | – | | 8 | – | 0 | – | 1 |
| Northern Michigan | | – | | 9 | – | 1 | – | 0 |
| Indiana (PA) | | – | | 8 | – | 1 | – | 0 |
| Santa Clara | | – | | 8 | – | 1 | – | 0 |
| Northeastern | | – | | 7 | – | 1 | – | 0 |
| Wheaton (IL) | | – | | 7 | – | 2 | – | 0 |
| Samford | | – | | 8 | – | 2 | – | 1 |
| Wayne State (MI) | | – | | 6 | – | 2 | – | 0 |
| Chattanooga | | – | | 7 | – | 3 | – | 0 |
| Eastern Michigan | | – | | 6 | – | 3 | – | 0 |
| Tennessee A&I | | – | | 6 | – | 3 | – | 0 |
| Parsons | | – | | 6 | – | 3 | – | 1 |
| Kentucky State | | – | | 5 | – | 3 | – | 1 |
| Hawaii | | – | | 6 | – | 4 | – | 0 |
| St. Norbert | | – | | 5 | – | 4 | – | 0 |
| Akron | | – | | 4 | – | 4 | – | 1 |
| Carnegie Mellon | | – | | 4 | – | 4 | – | 0 |
| Cortland | | – | | 4 | – | 4 | – | 0 |
| Northern Arizona | | – | | 5 | – | 5 | – | 0 |
| Northern Illinois | | – | | 5 | – | 5 | – | 0 |
| UC Riverside | | – | | 4 | – | 4 | – | 1 |
| UC Santa Barbara | | – | | 5 | – | 5 | – | 0 |
| Drake | | – | | 4 | – | 5 | – | 0 |
| Pacific (CA) | | – | | 4 | – | 5 | – | 0 |
| Portland State | | – | | 4 | – | 6 | – | 0 |
| Lincoln (MO) | | – | | 3 | – | 5 | – | 0 |
| Boston University | | – | | 3 | – | 6 | – | 0 |
| Lake Forest | | – | | 3 | – | 6 | – | 0 |
| Milwaukee | | – | | 3 | – | 6 | – | 0 |
| Mississippi Valley State | | – | | 3 | – | 6 | – | 0 |
| Southern Illinois | | – | | 3 | – | 7 | – | 0 |
| Colorado College | | – | | 2 | – | 5 | – | 1 |
| Rose Poly | | – | | 1 | – | 6 | – | 2 |
| Tampa | | – | | 2 | – | 7 | – | 0 |
| Wabash | | – | | 2 | – | 7 | – | 0 |
| Cal Poly Pomona | | – | | 2 | – | 8 | – | 0 |

The 1967 Hawaii Rainbows football team represented the University of Hawaiʻi at Mānoa as an independent during the 1967 NCAA College Division football season. In their first season under head coach Don King, the Rainbows compiled a 6–4 record.

== Schedule ==
| Date | Opponent | Site | Result | Attendance | Source |
|---|---|---|---|---|---|
| September 23 | Linfield | Honolulu Stadium; Honolulu, HI | L 13–15 | 20,000–20,500 | |
| September 30 | Lewis & Clark | Honolulu Stadium; Honolulu, HI | W 34–3 | 15,000 | |
| October 14 | Central Washington | Honolulu Stadium; Honolulu, HI | W 30–7 | 18,500–20,000 | |
| October 21 | at Humboldt State | Redwood Bowl; Arcata, CA | L 0–13 | 3,000–3,500 | |
| October 28 | Cal State Los Angeles | Honolulu Stadium; Honolulu, HI | L 3–9 | 16,842–17,500 | |
| November 4 | Idaho State | Honolulu Stadium; Honolulu, HI | W 21–6 | 8,000–14,500 | |
| November 11 | UC Santa Barbara | Honolulu Stadium; Honolulu, HI | W 15–7 | 17,500–18,000 | |
| November 18 | at Cal Western | Balboa Stadium; San Diego, CA | W 40–14 | 4,000 | |
| November 25 | Fresno State^{†} | Honolulu Stadium; Honolulu, HI (rivalry) | W 29–19 | 18,000–18,500 | |
| December 2 | Utah | Honolulu Stadium; Honolulu, HI | L 20–25 | 18,500–19,500 | |
^{†}Homecoming
