= Parsons College =

Private college in Fairfield, Iowa, US

Coordinates: 41.0174°N 91.9680°W

- Parsons College seal
- Motto: Est Modus In Rebus
- Type: Private liberal arts
- Established: 1875, closed in 1973
- Affiliations: North Central Association
- President: Millard G. Roberts, 1955–67
- Location: Fairfield, Iowa, United States
- Campus: Rural 272 acres (110.1 ha)
- Colors: Rose, Green and White
- Nickname: Wildcats
- Website: Parsons College alumni web site

Parsons College was a private liberal arts college from 1875 to 1973 located in Fairfield, Iowa.

The school was named for its wealthy benefactor, Lewis B. Parsons Sr., and was founded in 1875 with one building and 34 students. Over the years new buildings were constructed as enrollment expanded. The school lost its accreditation in 1948 but regained it two years later. In 1955 the school appointed Millard G. Roberts as its president and this began a period of rapid expansion with the student population rising as high as 5,000 by 1966. There was a turning point, however, in 1966 when Life magazine published an article criticizing the college and its president. In the spring of 1967, the school lost its accreditation and Roberts was asked to resign as president. Although they regained their accreditation in the spring of 1970, enrollment had quickly declined and the college floundered with $14 million in debt and closed under bankruptcy in 1973.

== History ==
=== 1875 to 1954 ===
Parsons College was named for Lewis B. Parsons Sr., a wealthy New York merchant who died in 1855 and left much of his estate as an endowment for an institution of higher learning in Iowa. His sons, the executors of Parsons' estate, considered a number of possible locations for the school and 20 years later chose a tract of land just north of Fairfield. The residents of Fairfield promised $27,516 towards the college, and its committee paid W. H. Jordan $13,000 for Henn Mansion building and 20 acres of land.

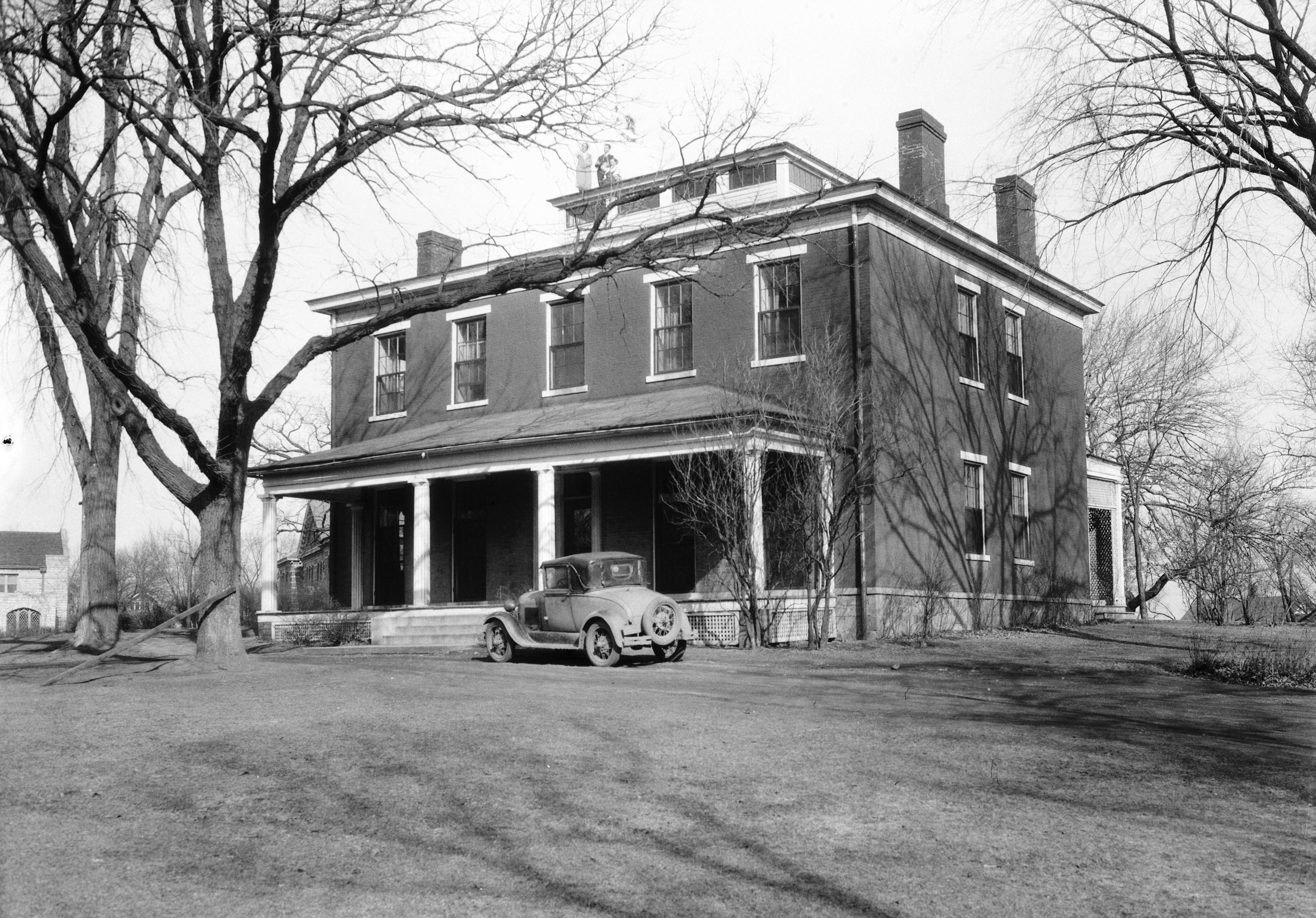
Ewing Hall in 1934

O.B. (Oscar Bernard) Nelson, coach

The college opened in 1875 with 34 students who attended classes in the brick home called "the Mansion" that was built in 1857 by Congressman Bernhart Henn. The faculty were three Presbyterian ministers and enrollment grew to 63 students by year end. Alexander G. Wilson was in charge of faculty and held the title of "rector." He also oversaw the college's preparatory department, which later became the Parsons Academy until its closure in 1917. A $7,000 chapel building was erected in 1876, and John Armstrong succeeded Wilson and assumed the title of college president, until August 12, 1879, when he died suddenly. The third president was Thomas Davis Ewing, who served from 1880 to 1890; the Mansion was later renamed Ewing Hall in his honor. A west wing was added to the chapel in 1882 by Des Moines architects Bell & Hackney, and an east wing was added in 1890-91 with a $15,000 donation from W. R. Ankeny of Des Moines, for whom the chapel was renamed Ankeny Hall.

The first football game played at Parsons was on September 16, 1893. Parsons won by a score of 70-0. This monumental win prompted the construction of Blum Stadium for the 1894 season. In 1896 Daniel E. Jenkins became college president at the age of 30 and was the youngest of the 16 who held the title during the school's 98-year history. Ankeny Hall contained the chapel, the library, and the classrooms when it was destroyed by fire in August 1902, leaving the college with only two buildings: Henn Mansion and a newly constructed women's dormitory called Ballard Hall.

The college rebounded by raising funds from board members and other local residents for new construction. In 1903 Fairfield Hall and Foster Hall were completed and the Carnegie Library was opened in 1907 due in part to a donation from philanthropist Andrew Carnegie. These new buildings were in the Beaux Arts-style and were designed by Chicago architect Henry K. Holsman. In 1908, college trustee Theodore Wells Barhydt donated $33,000 for a chapel, which was built in Norman Gothic style and designed by Holsman. It was completed in 1909 and named the Barhydt Memorial Chapel in honor of Barhydt's parents. The chapel included $1,800 worth of art-glass windows. The Trustee Gymnasium opened in 1910 and later an extension to the chapel called the Bible Building and later renamed Parsons Hall.

Enrollment steadily increased after World War I but declined during the World War II years, and in 1948 Parsons lost its accreditation. The college was strengthened by appointment of college President Tom E. Shearer in 1948, and it regained accreditation in 1950.

=== 1955 to 1973 ===
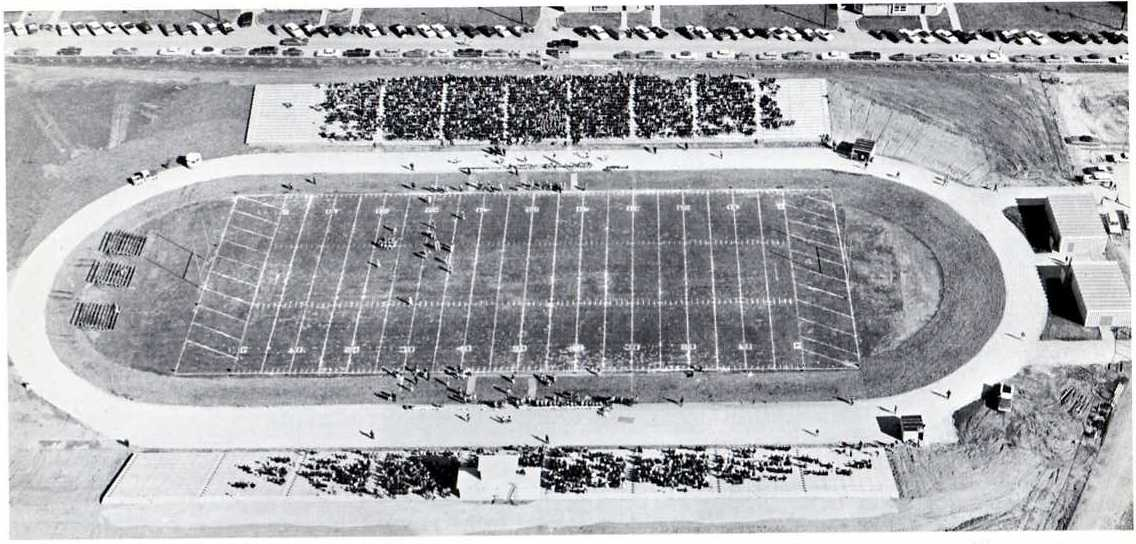
Blum Stadium, October 22, 1966 vs. Delta State

In 1955, the trustees appointed a Presbyterian minister from New York City, Millard G. Roberts, as president of the 357-student college. Over the years, Roberts was both hailed and criticized for his flamboyant management style. His first objective was to increase enrollment, and for ten years Parsons College allegedly had the highest percentage of enrollment increase nationwide. When the number of students reached 1,000, new dormitories were built to keep up with the demand.

Roberts instituted the multi-pronged Parsons Plan. Features included:

- Division of the year into three 4-month trimesters. This gave students more time to delve deeply into their classes.
- Establishment of the Summer Fine Arts Festival. Each of the three trimesters carried equal academic weight, but the summer trimester included unique art, music, dance, and theater class and performance offerings not available at other times of the year. (Because each trimester carried equal academic weight, students who had to take a term off to work could do so during any term, thereby avoiding the competition for summer jobs.)
- Division of the student body into three cohorts. The top tier, comprising academic "stars", were offered full scholarships; the bottom two tiers, comprising average and below-average students who couldn't get into (or had flunked out of) other colleges, paid full tuition.
- The tutorial system, whereby lectures were conducted by doctorate professors two or three times a week. On the other days of the week, students met with Masters-level tutors who conducted smaller discussion-oriented sessions; students thereby met five days a week.
- Admission was offered to marginal students right out of high school, who otherwise might not have been able to go to college, as well as to students who had flunked out of other colleges.

Among Roberts's innovations was the establishment of the trimester system, which made possible year-round use of the facility and allowed students to reduce the time needed to obtain a degree. He lowered admission requirements and Parsons became known as a school that gave students a second chance. He increased the student-teacher ratio, slashed the academic curriculum, and established recruiters around the country.

In 1962, six professors filed a formal complaint against the college. The North Central Association (NCA) conducted an investigation and put the college on probation in 1963. In 1964 student enrollment reached 2,500; the probation was lifted in 1965, and enrollment reached 5,000 students in 1966. Roberts reportedly raided other campuses for "strong faculty" by offering higher salaries and more benefits. By 1966 the college had the third highest-paid faculty in the nation. However, despite huge increases in enrollment, the college debt increased by an average of $100,000 per month during the 12 years that Roberts was president.

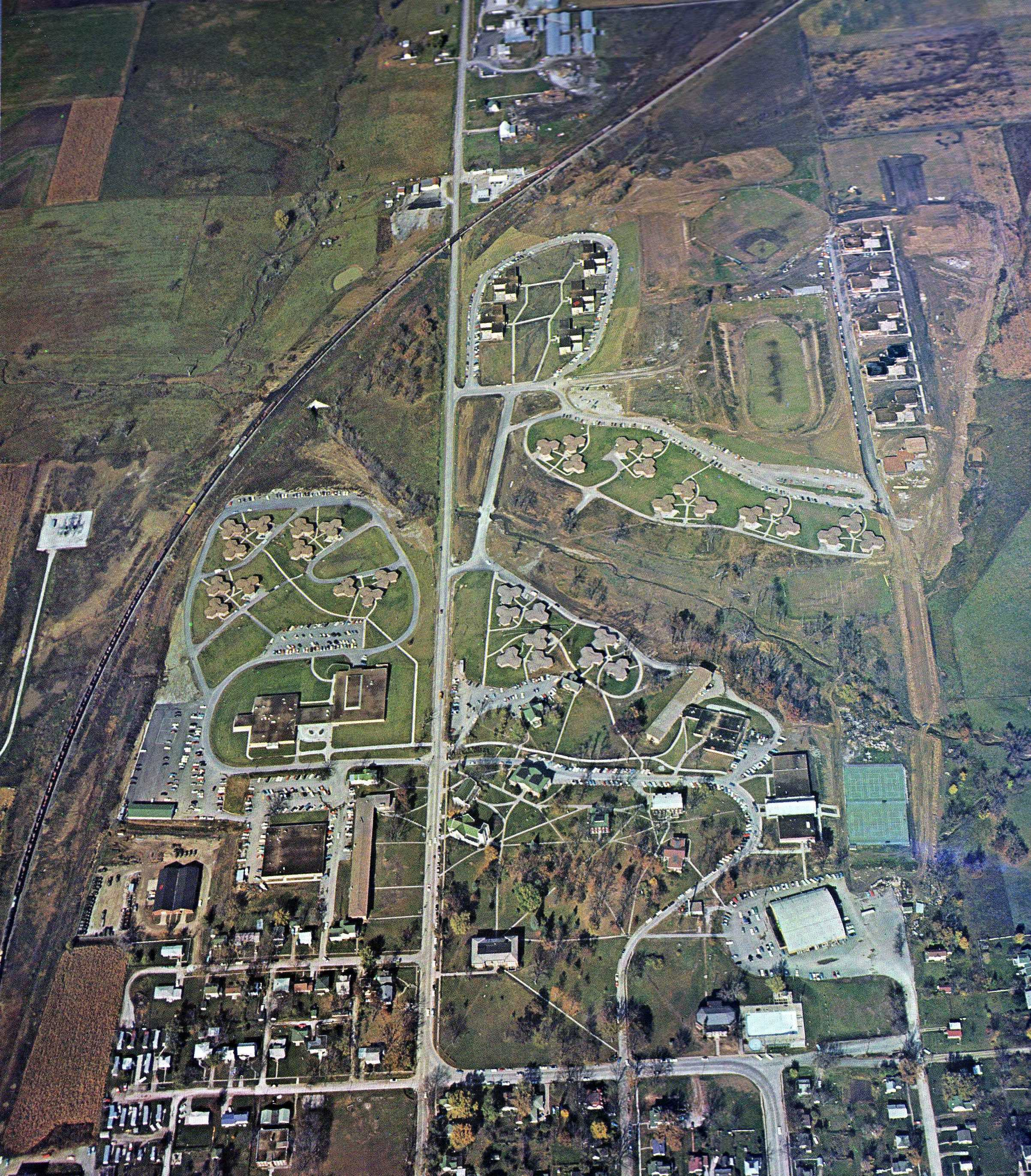
Aerial view in 1964

In 1966, a new football stadium, Blum Stadium was dedicated.

An article criticizing Roberts and the college titled "The Wizard of Flunk-Out U." was published in the 3 June 1966 issue of LIFE. In 1967 the NCA revoked the college's accreditation citing "administrative weakness" and a $14 million debt. Roberts responded with threats of a lawsuit, but the faculty voted 101 to 58 to remove Roberts from his position. In June 1967 the board of trustees asked for his resignation. William B. Munson became acting president for two months and was succeeded by Wayne E. Stamper, who served from 1967-1968. The school played its final season of football in 1970. Within a year enrollment had dropped to 2,000 students. The school's enrollment plunged from 5,000 to 1,500, and though accreditation was regained in the spring of that year, the upheaval of the late 1960s had fatally undermined its reputation. In 1973, Everett E. Hadley became acting president of the college.

Two innovative programs, "Foreign Language - Foreign Service Institute" and "Religious Service Community," attracted new students. However, enrollment dropped to 925 students, and the school went into bankruptcy - permanently closing in 1973. Over the years Roberts had created satellite colleges that operated under the leadership of Parsons. They were Lea College in Albert Lea, Minnesota, John J. Pershing College in Beatrice, Nebraska; Charles City College in Charles City, Iowa; College of Artesia in Artesia, New Mexico; Hiram Scott College in Scottsbluff, Nebraska.; and Midwestern College in Denison, Iowa. However, by 1973, all had fallen into bankruptcy. In August 1974, the campus was purchased by Maharishi International University.

== Notable alumni ==
- William E. Andrews, U.S. congressman from Nebraska
- Ron Cochran, network television anchor
- David T. Fischer, former United States ambassador to Morocco
- Rich Folkers, MLB pitcher
- Maruta Gardner, educator and community activist
- H. Robert Heller, economist, banker, and Federal Reserve Board member
- Mike Hennigan, former NFL player and college football coach (Tennessee Tech)
- Carol M. Highsmith, America's documentarian – America Collection in the Library of Congress
- Richard L. Lawson, United States Air Force general
- F. Dickinson Letts, U.S. congressman (Iowa) and federal judge
- Rhine McLin, 54th mayor of Dayton, Ohio
- Allen E. Paul, Indiana state senator, Republican representing District 27 from 1986 to 2014
- Claude R. Porter, member of the Iowa General Assembly and United States Attorney
- Don Reinhoudt, American powerlifter and strongman.
- Bob Stiller, founder of Keurig Green Mountain coffee company now Keurig Dr Pepper
- Jim Todd, MLB pitcher
- Marcia Wallace, Emmy award-winning actress (The Bob Newhart Show, The Simpsons) and game show panelist
