= List of Duquesne Dukes football seasons =

The Duquesne Dukes football team competes in the National Collegiate Athletic Association (NCAA) representing Duquesne University. The team competes in the NCAA Division I Football Championship Subdivision (FCS) and is a member of the Northeast Conference.

== Seasons ==
Yellow = .500 record; Orange = above .500 record; Green = undefeated

| Year | Wins | Losses | Ties | Coach | Ranking | Regular Season Championship/Postseason Appearance | National Championship |
|---|---|---|---|---|---|---|---|
| 1891 (Note: Season included a 6–0 win vs. Pittsburgh High School, a 4–0 loss vs. the Western University of Pennsylvania second team, an 18–2 win vs. Butler, and, in March 1892 (in the same academic year as the aforementioned games), a 6–0 win vs. Hazelwood.) | 3 | 1 | 0 | Dan Barr | | | |
| 1892 (Note: Season included a 28–0 win vs. Hazelwood, a 14–0 win vs. Wilkinsburg Athletic Assn., and a 4–4 tie vs. the Pittsburgh Athletic Club reserve team.) | 2 | 0 | 1 | Dan Barr | | | |
| 1893 | 6 | 2 | 0 | Coach Unknown | | | |
| 1894 | 8 (Note: Includes victories claimed by the school in games with disputed outcomes.) | 3 | 0 | Dr. G.S. Proctor | | | |
| 1896 | 12 | 1 | | Ernest "Rags" Brown | | | |
| 1897 | 3 | 5 | 2 | J.P. Wolfe | | | |
| 1898 | 6 | 4 | 1 | John Van Cleve | | | |
| 1899 | 2 | 0 | 2 | Will Walker | | | |
| 1900 | 3 | 3 | 1 | Coach Unknown | | | |
| 1901 | 3 | 3 | 0 | Coach Unknown | | | |
| 1902 | 1 | 6 | 0 | Captain Hickson | | | |
| 1903 | 3 | 5 | 0 | T.A. Giblin | | | |
| 1913 | 3 | 5 | 1 | Norman "Bill" Budd | | | |
| 1914 | 1 | 5 | 0 | Norman "Bill" Budd | | | |
| 1920 | 3 | 3 | 1 | E.A. Jake Stahl | | | |
| 1921 | 0 | 4 | 1 | E.A. Jake Stahl | | | |
| 1922 | 0 | 8 | 0 | Hal Ballin | | | |
| 1923 | 4 | 4 | 0 | Hal Ballin | | | |
| 1924 | 2 | 4 | 2 | Mike Shortley | | | |
| 1925 | 0 | 7 | 0 | Frank McDermott | | | |
| 1926 | 2 | 5 | 1 | Frank McDermott | | | |
| 1927 | 4 | 4 | 1 | Elmer Layden | | | |
| 1928 | 8 | 1 | 0 | Elmer Layden | | | |
| 1929 | 9 | 0 | 1 | Elmer Layden | | | |
| 1930 | 7 | 3 | 0 | Elmer Layden | | | |
| 1931 | 3 | 5 | 3 | Elmer Layden | | | |
| 1932 | 7 | 2 | 1 | Elmer Layden | | | |
| 1933 | 10 | 1 | 0 | Elmer Layden | | Festival of Palms Bowl Champions | |
| 1934 | 8 | 2 | 0 | Joe Bach | | | |
| 1935 | 6 | 3 | 0 | Christie Flanagan | | | |
| 1936 | 8 | 2 | 0 | Clipper Smith | #14 NCAA Division I FBS (AP) | Orange Bowl Champions | |
| 1937 | 6 | 4 | 0 | Clipper Smith | | | |
| 1938 | 4 | 6 | 0 | Clipper Smith | | | |
| 1939 | 8 | 0 | 1 | Aldo Donelli | #10 NCAA Division I FBS (AP) | declined Cotton Bowl, Sun Bowl and "Olympic Bowl" invitations | |
| 1940 | 7 | 1 | 0 | Aldo Donelli | | | |
| 1941 | 8 | 0 | 0 | Aldo Donelli | #8 NCAA Division I Football Bowl Subdivision (Associated Press) | | #1 NCAA Division I FBS (Massey Ratings) |
| 1942 | 6 | 3 | 1 | Aldo Donelli | | | |
| 1947 | 2 | 8 | 0 | Kass Kovalcheck | | | |
| 1948 | 2 | 7 | 0 | Kass Kovalcheck | | | |
| 1949 | 3 | 6 | 0 | Phil Ahwesh | | | |
| 1950 | 2 | 6 | 1 | Phil Ahwesh / Doc Skender | | | |
| 1969 | 2 | 4 | 0 | Joe Nicoletti | | (School brings football back at the club level) | |
| 1970 | 4 | 3 | 1 | Dan McCann | #15 club football (National Club Football Association) | | |
| 1971 | 4 | 4 | 0 | Dan McCann | | | |
| 1972 | 7 | 1 | 0 | Dan McCann | #3 club football (NCFA) | | |
| 1973 | 10 | 0 | 0 | Dan McCann | #1 club football (NCFA) | Children's Hospital Bowl Champions | NCFA National Champions |
| 1974 | 5 | 2 | 0 | Dan McCann | #6 club football (NCFA) | | |
| 1975 | 5 | 4 | 0 | Dan McCann | | | |
| 1976 | 6 | 2 | 0 | Dan McCann | #4 club football (NCFA) | | |
| 1977 | 7 | 2 | 0 | Dan McCann | #2 club football (NCFA) | NCFA Championship Game Runners-up | |
| 1978 | 5 | 3 | 0 | Dan McCann | #7 club football (NCFA) | | |
| 1979 | 5 | 4 | 0 | Dan McCann | | (First season at NCAA Division III level) | |
| 1980 | 4 | 5 | 0 | Dan McCann | | | |
| 1981 | 4 | 5 | 0 | Dan McCann | | | |
| 1982 | 6 | 3 | 0 | Dan McCann | | | |
| 1983 | 5 | 4 | 1 | Dan McCann | | | |
| 1984 | 3 | 5 | 1 | Terry Russell | | | |
| 1985 | 3 | 6 | 0 | Terry Russell | | | |
| 1986 | 5 | 3 | 1 | Terry Russell | | | |
| 1987 | 2 | 7 | 0 | Terry Russell | | | |
| 1988 | 2 | 7 | 0 | Dan McCann | | | |
| 1989 | 6 | 4 | 0 | Dan McCann | | | |
| 1990 | 1 | 8 | 1 | Dan McCann | | | |
| 1991 | 0 | 9 | 0 | Dan McCann | | | |
| 1992 | 5 | 4 | 0 | Dan McCann | | | |
| 1993 | 4 | 6 | 0 | Greg Gattuso | | (First season at NCAA Division I FCS level) | |
| 1994 | 6 | 4 | 0 | Greg Gattuso | | (First season in MAAC) | |
| 1995 | 10 | 1 | 0 | Greg Gattuso | | MAAC Champions; ECAC Bowl Champions | |
| 1996 | 10 | 1 | 0 | Greg Gattuso | | MAAC Champions; ECAC Bowl Runners-up | |
| 1997 | 7 | 3 | 0 | Greg Gattuso | | | |
| 1998 | 8 | 3 | 0 | Greg Gattuso | | | |
| 1999 | 8 | 3 | 0 | Greg Gattuso | | MAAC Champions | |
| 2000 | 10 | 1 | 0 | Greg Gattuso | | MAAC Champions | |
| 2001 | 8 | 3 | 0 | Greg Gattuso | #4 NCAA Division I FCS Mid-Major (Sports Network) | MAAC Champions; ECAC Bowl Runners-up | |
| 2002 | 11 | 1 | 0 | Greg Gattuso | #2 NCAA Division I FCS Mid-Major (Sports Network) | MAAC Champions; ECAC Bowl Runners-up | |
| 2003 | 8 | 3 | 0 | Greg Gattuso | #1 NCAA Division I FCS Mid-Major (Sports Network) | MAAC Champions; Eastern College Athletic Conference Bowl Champions | NCAA Division I FCS Mid-Major national champions |
| 2004 | 7 | 3 | 0 | Greg Gattuso | #5 NCAA Division I FCS Mid-Major (Sports Network) | MAAC Champions | |
| 2005 | 7 | 3 | 0 | Jerry Schmitt | #3 NCAA Division I FCS Mid-Major (Sports Network) | MAAC Champions | |
| 2006 | 7 | 3 | 0 | Jerry Schmitt | #6 NCAA Division I FCS Mid-Major (Sports Network) | MAAC Champions | |
| 2007 | 6 | 4 | 0 | Jerry Schmitt | #8 NCAA Division I NCAA Division I FCS Mid-Major (Sports Network) | Metro Atlantic Athletic Conference Champions | |
| 2008 | 3 | 7 | 0 | Jerry Schmitt | | (First season in NEC) | |
| 2009 | 3 | 8 | 0 | Jerry Schmitt | | | |
| 2010 | 7 | 4 | 0 | Jerry Schmitt | | | |
| 2011 | 9 | 2 | 0 | Jerry Schmitt | | NEC Champions | |
| 2012 | 5 | 6 | 0 | Jerry Schmitt | | | |
| 2013 | 7 | 4 | 0 | Jerry Schmitt | | NEC Champions | |
| 2014 | 6 | 6 | 0 | Jerry Schmitt | | | |
| 2015 | 8 | 4 | 0 | Jerry Schmitt | | NEC Champions/NCAA Division I First Round | |
| 2016 | 8 | 3 | 0 | Jerry Schmitt | | NEC Champions | |
| 2017 | 7 | 4 | 0 | Jerry Schmitt | | | |
| 2018 | 9 | 4 | 0 | Jerry Schmitt | #22 National Collegiate Athletic Association Division I Football Championship Subdivision Writers Poll, #24 NCAA Division I FCS Coaches Poll | Northeast Conference Champions/NCAA Division I Second Round | |
| 2019 | 6 | 5 | 0 | Jerry Schmitt | | | |
| 2020 | 4 | 1 | 0 | Jerry Schmitt | | NEC Championship runner-up | |
| 2020 | 7 | 3 | 0 | Jerry Schmitt | | | |
| 2022 | 4 | 7 | 0 | Jerry Schmitt | | | |
| 2023 | 7 | 5 | 0 | Jerry Schmitt | | NEC Champions/NCAA Division I First Round | |
| 2024 | 8 | 3 | 0 | Jerry Schmitt | | NEC Co-champion | |
