= List of Geneva Golden Tornadoes football seasons =

The Geneva Golden Tornadoes football team represents Geneva College in collegiate level football. The team competes in NCAA Division III and is affiliated with the Presidents' Athletic Conference (PAC). The team is also a member of the National Christian College Athletic Association. Since its initial season in 1890, the team has won over 500 games. Home games are currently played at Reeves Field, in Beaver Falls, Pennsylvania.

== Results ==
=== Yearly results ===
The Geneva Golden Tornadoes football team's first season of football was in 1890, and as of 2010, has completed 117 seasons of football. (Geneva did not field a team during the 1906, 1943, 1944, and 1945 seasons).

| Year | Conference | Coach | Overall | | | | Conference | | | | Notes |
| Year | Conference | Coach | Win | Loss | Tie | Pct. | Win | Loss | Tie | Pct. | Notes |
|---|---|---|---|---|---|---|---|---|---|---|---|
| 1890 | None | William McCracken | 0 | 1 | 0 | .000 | | | | | |
| 1891 | None | William McCracken | 4 | 2 | 0 | .667 | | | | | |
| 1892 | None | William McCracken | 3 | 3 | 0 | .500 | | | | | |
| 1893 | None | William McCracken | 2 | 2 | 1 | .500 | | | | | |
| 1894 | None | William McCracken | 5 | 1 | 0 | .833 | | | | | |
| 1895 | None | William McCracken | 0 | 5 | 0 | .000 | | | | | |
| 1896 | None | William McCracken | 3 | 4 | 0 | .429 | | | | | |
| 1897 | None | Ross Fiscus | 3 | 4 | 1 | .438 | | | | | |
| 1898 | None | Ross Fiscus | 1 | 4 | 1 | .250 | | | | | |
| 1899 | None | Ross Fiscus | 2 | 1 | 0 | .667 | | | | | |
| . | | 1890–99 Totals | 23 | 27 | 3 | .462 | | | | | 53 Total Games |
| 1900 | None | J.B. Craig | 5 | 1 | 1 | .786 | | | | | |
| 1901 | None | J.B. Craig | 5 | 1 | 2 | .750 | | | | | |
| 1902 | None | J.B. Craig | 7 | 0 | 0 | 1.000 | | | | | |
| 1903 | None | J.B. Craig | 9 | 1 | 0 | .900 | | | | | |
| 1904 | None | Smith Alford | 1 | 4 | 2 | .286 | | | | | |
| 1905 | None | Archibald Leech | 4 | 6 | 0 | .400 | | | | | |
| 1906 | | | | | | | | | | | No Football Team |
| 1907 | None | Arthur McKean | 4 | 5 | 2 | .455 | | | | | |
| 1908 | None | Arthur McKean | 0 | 6 | 2 | .000 | | | | | |
| 1909 | None | Arthur McKean | 4 | 2 | 0 | .667 | | | | | |
| . | | 1900-09 Totals | 39 | 26 | 9 | .588 | | | | | 74 Total Games |
| 1910 | None | Arthur McKean | 2 | 5 | 2 | .333 | | | | | |
| 1911 | None | Arthur McKean | 0 | 6 | 1 | .071 | | | | | |
| 1912 | None | Graydon Long | 3 | 4 | 0 | .429 | | | | | |
| 1913 | None | C.B. Metheny | 4 | 3 | 0 | .571 | | | | | |
| 1914 | None | C.B. Metheny | 5 | 3 | 0 | .625 | | | | | |
| 1915 | None | C.B. Metheny | 5 | 3 | 0 | .625 | | | | | |
| 1916 | None | C.B. Metheny | 2 | 5 | 2 | .333 | | | | | |
| 1917 | None | P.H. Bridenbaugh | 5 | 3 | 1 | .611 | | | | | |
| 1918 | None | P.H. Bridenbaugh | 4 | 2 | 0 | .667 | | | | | |
| 1919 | None | P.H. Bridenbaugh | 4 | 2 | 2 | .625 | | | | | |
| | | 1910–19 Totals | 34 | 36 | 8 | .487 | | | | | 78 Total Games |
| 1920 | None | P.H. Bridenbaugh | 5 | 2 | 1 | .688 | | | | | |
| 1921 | None | P.H. Bridenbaugh | 5 | 3 | 1 | .611 | | | | | |
| 1922 | None | Robert Park | 4 | 6 | 0 | .400 | | | | | |
| 1923 | None | Tom Davies | 6 | 2 | 1 | .722 | | | | | |
| 1924 | None | Jack Sack | 3 | 4 | 2 | .444 | | | | | |
| 1925 | None | Bo McMillin | 6 | 3 | 0 | .667 | | | | | |
| 1926 | None | Bo McMillin | 8 | 2 | 0 | .800 | | | | | Defeated Oglethorpe in the Orange Blossoms Football Classic. |
| 1927 | None | Bo McMillin | 8 | 0 | 1 | .944 | | | | | |
| 1928 | None | Mack Flenniken | 5 | 5 | 0 | .500 | | | | | |
| 1929 | None | Mack Flenniken | 2 | 6 | 1 | .278 | | | | | |
| | | 1920–29 Totals | 52 | 33 | 7 | .603 | | | | | 92 Total games |
| 1930 | None | Howard Harpster | 9 | 1 | 0 | .900 | | | | | |
| 1931 | None | Howard Harpster | 6 | 2 | 2 | .700 | | | | | |
| 1932 | None | Howard Harpster | 7 | 3 | 0 | .700 | | | | | |
| 1933 | None | Jimmy Robertson | 7 | 3 | 0 | .700 | | | | | |
| 1934 | None | Dwight V. Beede | 2 | 5 | 2 | .333 | | | | | |
| 1935 | None | Dwight V. Beede | 8 | 1 | 0 | .889 | | | | | |
| 1936 | None | Dwight V. Beede | 4 | 4 | 1 | .500 | | | | | |
| 1937 | None | Edgar P. Weltner | 3 | 4 | 2 | .444 | | | | | |
| 1938 | None | Edgar P. Weltner | 5 | 5 | 0 | .500 | | | | | |
| 1939 | None | Edgar P. Weltner | 5 | 4 | 0 | .556 | | | | | |
| | | 1930–39 Totals | 56 | 32 | 7 | .626 | | | | | 95 Total Games |
| 1940 | None | Edgar P. Weltner | 3 | 6 | 0 | .333 | | | | | |
| 1941 | None | A.C. Ransom | 4 | 3 | 2 | .556 | | | | | |
| 1942 | None | Cal Hubbard | 6 | 3 | 0 | .667 | | | | | |
| 1943 | | | | | | | | | | | No Football Team |
| 1944 | | | | | | | | | | | No Football Team |
| 1945 | | | | | | | | | | | No Football Team |
| 1946 | None | A.C. Ransom | 7 | 1 | 0 | .875 | | | | | |
| 1947 | None | A.C. Ransom | 7 | 2 | 0 | .778 | | | | | |
| 1948 | None | A.C. Ransom | 2 | 6 | 0 | .250 | | | | | |
| 1949 | None | Walter J. West | 7 | 2 | 1 | .750 | | | | | |
| | | 1940–49 Totals | 36 | 23 | 3 | .605 | | | | | 62 Total Games |
| 1950 | None | Walter J. West | 8 | 1 | 0 | .889 | | | | | |
| 1951 | None | Walter J. West | 2 | 5 | 0 | .286 | | | | | |
| 1952 | None | Walter J. West | 1 | 6 | 1 | .188 | | | | | |
| 1953 | None | Byron Morgan | 4 | 5 | 0 | .444 | | | | | |
| 1954 | None | Byron Morgan | 6 | 2 | 1 | .722 | | | | | |
| 1955 | None | Byron Morgan | 6 | 3 | 0 | .667 | | | | | |
| 1956 | None | Byron Morgan | 5 | 3 | 1 | .611 | | | | | |
| 1957 | None | Byron Morgan | 4 | 3 | 2 | .556 | | | | | |
| 1958 | None | Byron Morgan | 5 | 3 | 1 | .611 | | | | | |
| 1959 | None | Byron Morgan | 7 | 2 | 0 | .778 | | | | | |
| | | 1950–59 Totals | 48 | 33 | 6 | .586 | | | | | 87 Total Games |
| 1960 | None | Byron Morgan | 4 | 5 | 0 | .444 | | | | | |
| 1961 | None | Byron Morgan | 4 | 4 | 0 | .500 | | | | | |
| 1962 | None | Byron Morgan | 1 | 5 | 1 | .214 | | | | | |
| 1963 | None | Donald Lederick | 1 | 7 | 0 | .125 | | | | | |
| 1964 | None | Donald Lederick | 1 | 6 | 1 | .188 | | | | | |
| 1965 | None | Donald Lederick | 3 | 5 | 0 | .375 | | | | | |
| 1966 | None | Donald Lederick | 0 | 8 | 0 | .000 | | | | | |
| 1967 | None | Joe Banks | 1 | 7 | 0 | .125 | | | | | |
| 1968 | None | Joe Banks | 0 | 7 | 1 | .063 | | | | | |
| 1969 | None | Dan Fraiser | 1 | 6 | 1 | .188 | | | | | |
| | | 1960–69 Totals | 16 | 60 | 4 | .225 | | | | | 80 Total Games |
| 1970 | None | Dan Fraiser | 1 | 8 | 0 | .111 | | | | | |
| 1971 | None | Dan Fraiser | 7 | 2 | 0 | .778 | | | | | |
| 1972 | None | Max Holm | 8 | 1 | 0 | .889 | | | | | |
| 1973 | None | Max Holm | 4 | 5 | 0 | .444 | | | | | |
| 1974 | None | Dick Lasse | 1 | 8 | 0 | .111 | | | | | |
| 1975 | None | Dick Lasse | 0 | 9 | 0 | .000 | | | | | |
| 1976 | None | Gene Sullivan | 1 | 8 | 0 | .111 | | | | | |
| 1977 | None | Gene Sullivan | 1 | 8 | 0 | .111 | | | | | |
| 1978 | None | Gene Sullivan | 3 | 7 | 0 | .300 | | | | | |
| 1979 | None | Gene Sullivan | 3 | 6 | 0 | .667 | | | | | |
| | | 1970–79 Totals | 29 | 62 | 0 | .319 | | | | | 91 Total Games |
| 1980 | None | Gene Sullivan | 4 | 5 | 0 | .444 | | | | | |
| 1981 | None | Gene Sullivan | 5 | 3 | 1 | .611 | | | | | |
| 1982 | None | Gene Sullivan | 4 | 5 | 0 | .444 | | | | | |
| 1983 | None | Gene Sullivan | 5 | 4 | 0 | .556 | | | | | |
| 1984 | None | Gene Sullivan | 3 | 6 | 0 | .333 | | | | | |
| 1985 | None | Gene Sullivan | 5 | 4 | 0 | .556 | | | | | |
| 1986 | None | Gene Sullivan | 4 | 6 | 0 | .400 | | | | | |
| 1987 | None | Gene Sullivan | 11 | 2 | 0 | .846 | | | | | Reached NAIA Semi-Finals |
| 1988 | None | Gene Sullivan | 8 | 2 | 0 | .800 | | | | | |
| 1989 | None | Gene Sullivan | 6 | 3 | 0 | .667 | | | | | |
| | | 1980–89 Totals | 55 | 40 | 1 | .578 | | | | | 96 Total Games |
| 1990 | None | Gene Sullivan | 5 | 5 | 0 | .667 | | | | | |
| 1991 | None | Gene Sullivan | 3 | 6 | 1 | .350 | | | | | |
| 1992 | None | Gene Sullivan | 4 | 5 | 0 | .444 | | | | | |
| 1993 | None | Geno DeMarco | 4 | 5 | 0 | .444 | | | | | |
| 1994 | None | Geno DeMarco | 6 | 3 | 0 | .667 | | | | | |
| 1995 | None | Geno DeMarco | 9 | 2 | 0 | .818 | | | | | Lost to Malone University in First Round of NAIA Playoffs. |
| 1996 | None | Geno DeMarco | 7 | 3 | 0 | .700 | | | | | Lost to Findlay University in First Round of NAIA Playoffs. |
| 1997 | None | Geno DeMarco | 11 | 2 | 0 | .846 | | | | | Lost to Findlay University in Second Round of NAIA Playoffs. |
| 1998 | None | Geno DeMarco | 8 | 3 | 0 | .727 | | | | | Defeated Maranatha Baptist College in 1998 Victory Bowl. |
| 1999 | None | Geno DeMarco | 8 | 3 | 0 | .727 | | | | | Defeated MidAmerican Nazarene in the 1999 Victory Bowl. |
| | | 1990–99 Totals | 65 | 37 | 1 | .636 | | | | | 103 Total Games |
| 2000 | None | Geno DeMarco | 7 | 3 | 0 | .700 | | | | | |
| 2001 | None | Geno DeMarco | 4 | 6 | 0 | .400 | | | | | |
| 2002 | None | Geno DeMarco | 7 | 5 | 0 | .583 | | | | | Defeated Northwestern in the 2002 Victory Bowl. |
| 2003 | None | Geno DeMarco | 7 | 4 | 0 | .636 | | | | | Defeated North Greenville in the 2003 Victory Bowl. |
| 2004 | None | Geno DeMarco | 5 | 5 | 0 | .500 | | | | | |
| 2005 | None | Geno DeMarco | 8 | 4 | 0 | .667 | | | | | Lost to Georgetown College in First Round of NAIA Playoffs. |
| 2006 | None | Geno DeMarco | 4 | 5 | 0 | .444 | | | | | |
| 2007 | PAC | Geno DeMarco | 8 | 3 | 0 | .727 | 7 | 1 | 0 | .875 | Lost to Malone University in the 2007 Victory Bowl |
| 2008 | PAC | Geno DeMarco | 5 | 5 | 0 | .500 | 5 | 3 | 0 | .625 | |
| 2009 | PAC | Geno DeMarco | 8 | 3 | 0 | .727 | 5 | 3 | 0 | .625 | Defeated Greenville University in the 2009 Victory Bowl. |
| . | | 2000-09 Totals | 63 | 43 | 0 | .594 | | | | | 106 Total Games |
| 2010 | PAC | Geno DeMarco | 5 | 5 | 0 | .500 | 4 | 4 | 0 | .500 | |
| | | Totals | 521 | 457 | 49 | .531 | 21 | 12 | 0 | .656 | 1027 Total Games |

=== Postseason bowl results ===
Geneva has appeared in seven post season bowl games. The Golden Tornadoes have had good success, going 6–1 all-time in bowl games. The Golden Tornadoes have also decline two bowl invitations. (2000 Victory Bowl and 2007 ECAC Bowl).

Geneva College Bowl Games
| Date | Bowl Game | Home | Visitor | Outcome | Stadium | Location |
|---|---|---|---|---|---|---|
| Jan. 1 1927 | Orange Blossom Football Classic | Geneva College | Olgethorpe University | W 9-7 | Fairfield Stadium (neural site) | Jacksonville, FL |
| 1998 | Victory Bowl | Geneva College | Maranatha Baptist Bible College | W 27-6 | Fawcett Stadium (neural site) | Canton, OH |
| 1999 | Victory Bowl | Geneva College | MidAmerica Nazarene | W 31-26 | Fawcett Stadium (neutral site) | Canton, OH |
| 2002 | Victory Bowl | Northwestern(MN) | Geneva College | W 19-9 | Hubert H. Humphrey Metrodome | Minneapolis, MN |
| 2003 | Victory Bowl | Geneva College | North Greenville College | W 37-14 | Reeves Field | Beaver Falls, PA |
| 2007 | Victory Bowl | Geneva College | Malone University | L 45-17 | Reeves Field | Beaver Falls, PA |
| 2009 | Victory Bowl | Greenville College | Geneva College | W 29-28 | Francis Field | Greenville, IL |

=== Postseason playoff results ===
Prior to joining NCAA Division-III, Geneva competed in eight NAIA playoff games, finishing with a record of 4–4 (including forfeit victory) and reaching the national semi-finals in 1987. The Golden Tornadoes joined the Presidents' Athletic Conference in 2007 and had to undergo a four-year provisional period, where they were ineligible for the NCAA Division-III playoffs, and conference awards. In 2007, the Golden Tornadoes would have finished second in the PAC, with a 7–1 record against PAC opponents. Had they not been provisional members, the GTs might have qualified for the NCAA Division-III playoffs.

Geneva College Playoff Games
| Date | Playoff Game | Opponent | Outcome | Note |
|---|---|---|---|---|
| 1987 | NAIA First-Round | Bluffton University | W 16-13 | |
| 1987 | NAIA Second-Round | Westminster College | W 16-15 | |
| 1987 | NAIA Semi-Finals | Wisconsin-Stevens Point | W 25-48 | UW-SP forfeited the victory for use of an ineligible player. |
| 1995 | NAIA First Round | Malone University | L 23-24 | |
| 1996 | NAIA First Round | Findlay University | L 13-38 | |
| 1997 | NAIA First Round | Campbellsville University | W 34-13 | |
| 1997 | NAIA Second Round | Findlay University | L 7-28 | |
| 2005 | NAIA First Round | Georgetown College | L 35-36 | |

== Milestones ==
=== Wins ===
- 1st – 42-0 vs Westminster (1891)
- 100th – 31-0 vs Thiel (1920)
- 200th – 13-7 vs Drexel (1939)
- 300th – 30-26 vs Juniata (1965)
- 400th – 44-28 vs Wilmington (1992)
- 500th – 29-7 vs LaSalle (2007)

=== Games ===
- 1st – 1890 vs Pitt (L 4-10)
- 100th – 1905 vs Penn State (L 0-73)
- 200th – 1919 vs Muskingum (W 32-0)
- 300th – 1930 vs Canisius (W 33-7)
- 400th – 1940 vs Washington & Jefferson (L 0-10)
- 500th – 1955 vs Washington & Jefferson (W 46-6)
- 600th – 1967 vs Westminster (L 0-26)
- 700th – 1978 vs Westminster (L 7-34)
- 800th – 1989 vs Frostburg State (L 6-12)
- 900th – 1998 vs Maranatha Baptist (W 27-6)
- 1000th – 2008 vs Washington & Jefferson (L 14-43)

== Statistics ==
=== Best decades ===
1. 1990s .636
2. 1930s .626
3. 1940s .605
4. 1920s .603
5. 2000s .594

=== Worst decades ===
1. 1960s .225
2. 1970s .319
3. 1890s .462
4. 1910s .487
5. 1980s .578
