= 1959 John Carroll Blue Streaks football team =

American college football season

1959 John Carroll Blue Streaks football

PAC champion
- Conference: Presidents' Athletic Conference
- Record: 7–0 (6–0 PAC)
- Head coach: John Ray (1st season)
- Home stadium: Hosford Stadium

1959 Presidents' Athletic Conference football standings
| | Conf. | | | | | Overall |
| Team | W | | L | | T | W | | L | | T |
|---|---|---|---|---|---|---|---|---|---|---|
| John Carroll $ | 6 | – | 0 | – | 0 | 7 | – | 0 | – | 0 |
| Allegheny | 4 | – | 1 | – | 0 | 6 | – | 2 | – | 0 |
| Wayne State (MI) | 4 | – | 1 | – | 0 | 4 | – | 3 | – | 0 |
| Western Reserve | 3 | – | 2 | – | 0 | 3 | – | 4 | – | 0 |
| Thiel | 1 | – | 4 | – | 1 | 1 | – | 5 | – | 1 |
| Case Tech | 1 | – | 4 | – | 0 | 1 | – | 6 | – | 0 |
| Bethany (WV) | 1 | – | 4 | – | 0 | 1 | – | 8 | – | 0 |
| Washington & Jefferson | 0 | – | 4 | – | 1 | 1 | – | 6 | – | 0 |
$ – Conference champion

The 1959 John Carroll Blue Streaks football team was an American football team that represented John Carroll University as a member of the Presidents' Athletic Conference (PAC) during the 1959 college football season. In their first season under head coach John Ray, the Blue Streaks compiled a perfect 7–0 record, won the PAC championship, shut out five of seven opponents, and outscored all opponents by a total of 218 to 20. They gave up only three touchdowns, one of which was off an interception returned for a touchdown. The team was inducted into the John Carroll University Athletic Hall of Fame in 2009. It is one of three perfect seasons in John Carroll football history along with 1962 and 1963.

The team played its home games at Hosford Stadium in Cleveland Heights, Ohio.

== Schedule ==
| Date | Opponent | Site | Result | Attendance | Source |
|---|---|---|---|---|---|
| October 3 | Bethany (WV) | Hosford Stadium; Cleveland Heights, OH | W 45–0 | | |
| October 10 | at Waynesburg* | Waynesburg, PA | W 33–14 | | |
| October 17 | Wayne State | Hosford Stadium; Cleveland Heights, OH | W 40–0 | | |
| October 24 | at Case Tech | Cleveland, OH | W 48–6 | | |
| October 31 | Thiel | Hosford Stadium; Cleveland Heights, OH | W 12–0 | | |
| November 7 | Western Reserve | Hosford Stadium; Cleveland Heights, OH | W 20–0 | | |
| November 14 | at Washington & Jefferson | Washington, PA | W 20–0 | | |
*Non-conference game
