= 1961 Presidents' Athletic Conference football season =

- Sport: Football
- Teams: 8
- Champion: Allegheny

Football seasons
- 1960 1962

1961 Presidents' Athletic Conference football standings
	Conf.					Overall
Team	W		L		T	W		L		T
Allegheny $	5	–	1	–	0	6	–	1	–	0
John Carroll	4	–	1	–	0	5	–	2	–	0
Western Reserve	5	–	2	–	0	5	–	2	–	0
Case Tech	4	–	2	–	0	4	–	3	–	0
Bethany (WV)	2	–	4	–	0	2	–	5	–	0
Thiel	2	–	4	–	0	2	–	4	–	0
Wayne State (MI)	1	–	4	–	0	1	–	5	–	0
Washington & Jefferson	0	–	5	–	0	0	–	7	–	0
$ – Conference champion

The 1961 Presidents' Athletic Conference football season was the season of college football played by the eight member schools of the Presidents' Athletic Conference (PAC) as part of the 1961 college football season.

The 1961 Allegheny Gators football team compiled a 6–1 record and won the PAC championship. Stoner Tracy led the team and received all-conference honors both at quarterback and defensive halfback.

The 1961 All-PAC football team was led by John Carroll (five spots); Western Reserve (five spots); Allegheny (four spots); and Case Tech (four spots).

== Teams ==
=== Allegheny ===
1961 Allegheny Gators football

PAC champion
- Conference: Presidents' Athletic Conference
- Record: 6–1 (5–1 PAC)
- Head coach: John R. Chuckran (4th season)

The 1961 Allegheny Gators football team represented Allegheny College of Meadville, Pennsylvania. In their fourth year under head coach John R. Chuckran, the team compiled a 6–1 record (5–1 against PAC opponents) and won the PAC championship. The Gators were undefeated through the first six games, losing to the Thiel Tomcats in the final game of the season.

Allegheny players took four spots on the 1961 All-Presidents Athletic Conference football team: Stoner Tracy (quarterback on offense, halfbacks on defense); Joe Valentino (defensive tackle); and Phil Crichton (cornerback).

Date	Opponent	Site	Result	Attendance	Source
October 7	Bethany (WV)	Meadville, PA	W 33–14		
October 14	at Washington & Jefferson	Washington, PA	W 10–0	3,500	
October 21	Western Reserve^{†}	Meadville, PA	W 7–0	3,500	
October 28	at Case Tech	Clarke Field; Cleveland, OH	W 33–14		
November 4	at Grove City*	Grove City, PA	W 26–0	5,000	
November 11	at Wayne State	Tartar Field; Detroit, MI	W 20–8	2,089	
November 18	at Thiel	Greenville, PA	L 22–35		
*Non-conference game; ^{†}Homecoming

=== John Carroll ===
1961 John Carroll Blue Streaks football
- Conference: Presidents' Athletic Conference
- Record: 5–1 (4–1 PAC)
- Head coach: John Ray (3rd season)

The 1961 John Carroll Blue Streaks football team represented John Carroll University of University Heights, Ohio. In their third year under head coach John Ray, the team compiled a 5–1 record (4–1 against PAC opponents) and finished second in the PAC.

John Carroll took five spots on the 1961 All-Presidents Athletic Conference football team: Gordon Priemer (halfbacks on offense); Ted Uritis (end on offense); Gene Smith (guard on offense); John Kovach (end on defense); and Ron Timpanaro (linebacker).

Date	Opponent	Site	Result	Attendance	Source
October 7	Case Tech	Clarke Field; Cleveland, OH	W 6–0	5,100	
October 14	at Thiel	Greenville, PA	W 41–8		
October 21	Bethany (WV)	Cleveland, OH	W 34–12		
October 28	Wayne State^{†}	Hosford Stadium	W 62–0	3,000	
November 4	at Wabash*	Ingalls Field; Crawfordsville, IN	L 6–7		
November 11	Western Reserve	Clarke Field; Cleveland, OH	L 0–6	6,000	
November 18	at Hobart*	Boswell Field; Geneva, NY	W 6–0	1,800	
*Non-conference game; ^{†}Homecoming

=== Western Reserve ===
1961 Western Reserve Red Cats football
- Conference: Presidents' Athletic Conference
- Record: 5–2 (5–1 PAC)
- Head coach: Edward L. Finnigan (11th season)

The 1961 Western Reserve Red Cats football team represented Western Reserve University (now part of Case Western Reserve University) of Cleveland. In their 11th year under head coach Edward L. Finnigan, the team compiled a 5–2 record (5–1 against PAC opponents) and finished third in the PAC.

Western Reserve players took five spots on the 1961 All-Presidents Athletic Conference football team: Bob Swingle (fullback); Jay Schnackle (offensive tackle); Rudy Elaus (offensive guard); Dave Heiser (middle guard); and Doug Wilson (cornerback).

Date	Opponent	Site	Result	Attendance	Source
October 7	at Washington & Jefferson	Washington, PA	W 14–8		
October 14	Bethany (WV)	Cleveland, OH	W 20–0		
October 21	at Allegheny	Meadville, PA	L 0–7	3,500	
October 28	at Thiel	Greenville, PA	W 12–6		
November 4	Wayne State	Cleveland, OH	W 28–6	5,800	
November 11	John Carroll	Clarke Field; Cleveland, OH	W 6–0	6,000	
November 18	Case Tech	Cleveland, OH	L 20–21		

=== Case Tech ===
1961 Case Tech Rough Riders football
- Conference: Presidents' Athletic Conference
- Record: 4–3 (4–2 PAC)
- Head coach: Doug Mooney (5th season)

The 1961 Case Tech Rough Riders football team represented Case Institute of Technology (now part of Case Western Reserve University) of Cleveland. In their fifth year under head coach Doug Mooney, the team compiled a 4–3 record (4–2 against PAC opponents) and finished fourth in the PAC.

Case Tech players took four spots on the 1961 All-Presidents Athletic Conference football team: Dick Millie (quarterback on offense, halfback on defense); Ron Shilling (offensive end); and Bob Hugus (center).

Date	Opponent	Site	Result	Attendance	Source
October 7	John Carroll	Clarke Field; Cleveland, OH	L 0–6	5,100	
October 14	at Wayne State	Tartar Field; Detroit, MI	W 19–7		
October 21	Thiel^{†}	Clarke Field; Cleveland, OH	W 29–12		
October 28	Allegheny	Clarke Field; Cleveland, OH	L 14–33		
November 4	at Bethany (WV)	Bethany, WV	W 18–12		
November 11	at Indiana (PA)	Indiana, PA	L 6–37		
November 18	Western Reserve	Cleveland, OH	W 21–20		
^{†}Homecoming

=== Bethany ===
1961 Bethany Bison football
- Conference: Presidents' Athletic Conference
- Record: 2–5 (2–4 PAC)
- Head coach: John J. Knight (9th season)

The 1961 Bethany Bison football team represented Bethany College of Bethany, West Virginia. In their ninth year under head coach John J. Knight, the team compiled a 2–5 record (2–4 against PAC opponents) and tied for fifth place in the PAC.

Bethany took three spots on the 1961 All-Presidents Athletic Conference football team: Don Ashton (halfbacks on offense) and Ray Hack (tackle on offense and defense).

Date	Opponent	Site	Result	Attendance	Source
October 7	at Allegheny	Meadville, PA	L 14–33		
October 14	at Western Reserve	Cleveland, OH	L 0–20		
October 21	at John Carroll	Cleveland, OH	L 12–34		
October 28	Washington & Jefferson	Bethany, WV	W 14–12		
November 4	Case Tech	Bethany, WV	L 12–18		
November 11	Thiel	Bethany, WV	W 14–12		
November 18	West Virginia Wesleyan*	Bethany, WV	L 0–30		
*Non-conference game

=== Thiel ===
1961 Thiel Tomcats football
- Conference: Presidents' Athletic Conference
- Record: 2–4 (2–4 PAC)
- Head coach: Joe Difebo (7th season)

The 1961 Thiel Tomcats football team represented Thiel College of Greenville, Pennsylvania. In their seventh year under head coach Joe Difebo, the team compiled a 2–4 record (2–4 against PAC opponents) and tied for fifth place in the PAC.

Thiel defensive end was named to the 1961 All-Presidents Athletic Conference football team.

Date	Opponent	Site	Result	Attendance	Source
October 7	Lebanon Valley		Cancelled		
October 14	John Carroll	Greenville, PA	L 8–41		
October 21	at Case Tech	Clarke Field; Cleveland, OH	L 12–29		
October 28	Western Reserve	Greenville, PA	L 6–12		
November 4	at Washington & Jefferson	Washington, PA	W 28–7		
November 11	Bethany (WV)	Bethany, WV	L 12–14		
November 18	Allegheny	Greenville, PA	W 35–22		

=== Wayne State ===
1961 Wayne State Tartars football
- Conference: Presidents' Athletic Conference
- Record: 1–6 (1–4 PAC)
- Head coach: Harold D. Willard (2nd season)

The 1961 Wayne State Tartars football team represented Wayne State University of Detroit. In their second year under head coach Harold D. Willard, the team compiled a 1–6 record (1–4 against PAC opponents), was outscored by a total of 271 to 37, and finished seventh in the PAC.

Wayne State linebacker Barry Sarver was named to the 1961 All-Presidents Athletic Conference football team.

On October 28, Wayne State suffered the worst defeat in PAC history, losing, 62-0, against John Carroll. The Tartars tallied minus-nine yards rushing in the game. Three weeks later, the team then lost to Wittenberg by a 77-0 margin.

Date	Opponent	Site	Result	Attendance	Source
October 7	Wheaton (IL)*	Tartar Field; Detroit, MI	L 0–57		
October 14	Case Tech	Tartar Field; Detroit, MI	L 7–19		
October 21	Washington & Jefferson	Tartar Field; Detroit, MI	W 16–8		
October 28	at John Carroll^{†}	Hosford Stadium; Cleveland, OH	L 0–62	3,000	
November 4	at Western Reserve	Cleveland, OH	L 6–28		
November 11	Allegheny^{†}	Tartar Field; Detroit, MI	L 8–20	2,089	
November 18	at Wittenberg*	Springfield, OH	L 0–77	4,200	
*Non-conference game; ^{†}Homecoming

=== Washington & Jefferson ===
1961 Washington & Jefferson Presidents football
- Conference: Presidents' Athletic Conference
- Record: 0–7 (0–5 PAC)
- Head coach: Chuck Ream (2nd season)

The 1961 Washington & Jefferson Presidents football team represented Washington & Jefferson College of Washington, Pennsylvania. In their second year under head coach Chuck Ream, the team compiled a 0–7 record (0–5 against PAC opponents) and finished last in the PAC.

Date	Opponent	Site	Result	Attendance	Source
October 7	Western Reserve	Washington, PA	L 8–14		
October 14	Allegheny	Washington, PA	L 0–10	1,100	
October 21	at Wayne State	Tartar Field; Detroit, MI	L 8–16		
October 28	at Bethany (WV)	Bethany, WV	L 12–14		
November 4	Thiel	Washington, PA	L 7–28		
November 11	at Grove City*	Grove City, PA	L 0–26		
November 18	at Carnegie Tech*	Pittsburgh, PA	L 2–34	1,800	
*Non-conference game

== All-conference selections ==
At the end of the season, the conference coaches selected an all-conference team as follows:

Offense

- Quarterbacks - Dick Millie, Case Tech; Stoner Tracy, Allegheny
- Halfbacks - Don Ashton, Bethany; Gordon Priemer, John Carroll
- Fullback - Bob Swingle, Western Reserve
- Ends - Ted Uritis, John Carroll; Ron Shilling, Case Tech
- Tackles - Jay Schnackle, Western Reserve; Ray Hack, Bethany
- Guards - Gene Smith, John Carroll; Rudy Elaus, Western Reserve
- Center - Bob Hugus, Case Tech

Defense

- Ends - John Kovach, John Carroll; Bill Merkovsky, Thiel
- Tackles - Joe Valentino, Allegheny; Ray Hack, Bethany
- Middle guard - Dave Heiser, Western Reserve
- Linebackers - Barry Sarver, Wayne State; Ron Timpanaro, John Carroll
- Cornerbacks - Phil Crichton, Allegheny; Doug Wilson, Western Reserve
- Halfbacks - Dick Millie, Case Tech; Stoner Tracy, Allegheny
