= 1929 Duquesne Dukes football team =

American college football season

1929 Duquesne Dukes football

Tri-State champion
- Conference: Tri-State Conference
- Record: 9–0–1 (3–0 Tri-State)
- Head coach: Elmer Layden (3rd season)
- Captain: Aldo Donelli
- Home stadium: Duquesne campus, Forbes Field

1929 Tri-State Conference football standings
	Conf.					Overall
Team	W		L		T	W		L		T
Duquesne $	3	–	0	–	0	9	–	0	–	1
Thiel	2	–	1	–	0	2	–	5	–	2
Waynesburg	2	–	2	–	0	5	–	4	–	0
Westminster (PA)	2	–	2	–	0	3	–	4	–	0
Geneva	1	–	3	–	0	2	–	6	–	1
Bethany (WV)	0	–	2	–	0	1	–	7	–	0
$ – Conference champion

The 1929 Duquesne Dukes football team was an American football team that represented Duquesne University as a member of the Tri-State Conference during the 1929 college football season. In their third year under head coach Elmer Layden, the Dukes compiled a 9–0–1 record (3–0 in conference games), outscored opponents by a total of 154 to 53, and won the Tri-State championship. In three years under Layden, the Dukes improved from four losses in 1927 to one loss in 1928 to zero losses in 1929.

Team captain and halfback Aldo Donelli won a reputation as "one of the most certain passers and kickers in the game." The team's key players also included junior tackle Tom Kirby, fullback Kass Kovalcheck, tackle Babe Kelleher, quarterback Bud Divinney, and center Maurice Silverstein.

Duquesne played two home games on Bluff Field on the school's Pittsburgh campus and six homes games at Forbes Field in Pittsburgh.

== Schedule ==
Date	Opponent	Site	Result	Attendance	Source
September 21	Edinboro*	Duquesne campus; Pittsburgh, PA	W 12–0	4,000	
September 28	Slippery Rock*	Duquesne campus; Pittsburgh, PA	W 12–0	3,000	
October 5	at West Virginia*	Morgantown, WV	T 7–7		
October 12	Albion*	Forbes Field; Pittsburgh, PA	W 18–0		
October 19	Loyola (IL)*	Forbes Field; Pittsburgh, PA	W 7–6		
November 1	Geneva	Forbes Field; Pittsburgh, PA	W 27–7	20,000	
November 9	at Catholic University*^{†}	Brookland, Washington, DC	W 19–13	5,000	
November 15	Westminster (PA)	Forbes Field; Pittsburgh, PA	W 31–7	18,000	
November 23	Haskell*	Forbes Field; Pittsburgh, PA	W 7–6	5,000	
November 27	Waynesburg	Forbes Field; Pittsburgh, PA	W 14–7	5,000	
*Non-conference game; ^{†}Homecoming
