= Jerry Schweickert =

American athlete, coach, and educator

Biographical details
- Education: John Carroll University (B.A., M.A.); University of Akron (M.A., Ph.D.)

Playing career

Football
- 1957–1959: John Carroll
- Positions: Quarterback, punter, running back, defensive back

Coaching career (HC unless noted)

Football
- 1960–1964: John Carroll (freshmen)
- 1965–1976: John Carroll

Baseball
- 1973–1976: John Carroll
- 1979–1995: John Carroll

Women's volleyball
- 1986–1994: John Carroll (assistant)

Administrative career (AD unless noted)
- 1981–1986: John Carroll

Head coaching record
- Overall: 57–40–4 (football)

Accomplishments and honors

Championships
- Football; 4 PAC (1969, 1971, 1973–1974); Baseball; 8 PAC (1980, 1982–1985, 1987–1989)

Awards
- Baseball; 2 PAC Coach of the Year (1988–1989); OAC Coach of the Year (1992)

Gerald J. Schweickert is an American former athlete, coach, and administrator at John Carroll University. He played for and later coached the John Carroll Blue Streaks football, founded and coached the John Carroll baseball team, and was the school's athletic director.

== Football ==
A native of Chicago, Schweickert enrolled at John Carroll in 1955. He played quarterback, running back, defensive back, punter, punt returner, kick returner, and placekicker for the Blue Streaks. He was All-Presidents' Athletic Conference at quarterback in 1957 and 1958 and running back in 1959. He was the PAC's top punter in 1957, led the conference in passing yards in 1958, and scored the most points in the PAC in 1959. He was a member of the 1959 John Carroll Blue Streaks football team that compiled the first perfect record (7–0) in school history, won the PAC championship, shut out five of seven opponents, and outscored all opponents by a total of 218 to 20.

After graduating, Schweickert remained with the team as an assistant coach. In 1965, the 27-year-old Schweickert was promoted to head coach after Bill Dando became the defensive ends and linebackers coach at SMU. He resigned as coach after the 1976 season, but continued to coach the John Carroll baseball team and teach physical education classes. In his twelve seasons as head coach, Schweickert's teams compiled a 57–40–4 record and won the PAC championship 1969, 1971, 1973 and 1974.

== Baseball ==
Schweickert founded the John Carroll baseball team and served as its head coach from 1973 to 1976 and 1979 to 1995. He led the Blue Streaks to 8 PAC titles and an appearance in the 1984 NCAA Division III baseball tournament. He was named the PAC Coach of the Year in 1988 and 1989 and Ohio Athletic Conference Coach of the Year in 1992.

== Other work ==
Schweickert was John Carroll's athletic director from 1981 to 1986 and assistant volleyball coach from 1986 to 1994.

== Honors ==
Schweickert was inducted into the John Carroll Athletic Hall of Fame in 1968. The school named the Gerald J. Schweickert Outstanding Achievement Award in Athletics in his honor. John Carroll's home baseball field is also named after Schweickert.

== Head coaching record ==
=== Football ===
Year	Team	Overall	Conference	Standing	Bowl/playoffs
John Carroll Blue Streaks (Presidents' Athletic Conference) (1965–1976)
1965	John Carroll	5–1–1	5–1–1	2nd	
1966	John Carroll	4–3	4–1	2nd	
1967	John Carroll	3–4	3–2	T–3rd	
1968	John Carroll	4–4	4–2	T–2nd	
1969	John Carroll	7–1	6–0	1st	
1970	John Carroll	2–5–1	2–2–1	3rd	
1971	John Carroll	4–5	4–1	1st	
1972	John Carroll	7–3	5–2	T–2nd	
1973	John Carroll	7–1–2	5–0–2	1st	
1974	John Carroll	7–2	6–1	T–1st	
1975	John Carroll	4–5	3–3	T–3rd	
1976	John Carroll	3–6	2–5	T–5th	
John Carroll:		57–40–4	49–20–4		
Total:		57–40–4			
National championship Conference title Conference division title or championship game berth
