= John J. Knight =

Athletic director and athletics coach (1899–1988)

Biographical details
- Born: December 20, 1899; Grafton, West Virginia, U.S.
- Died: July 12, 1988 (aged 88); San Diego, California, U.S.
- Education: West Virginia Wesleyan College (1923)

Playing career

Football
- 1919–1922: West Virginia Wesleyan

Basketball
- 1919–1922: West Virginia Wesleyan

Baseball
- 1919–1922: West Virginia Wesleyan

Coaching career (HC unless noted)

Football
- 1923–1924: Weston HS (WV)
- 1925–1929: Wheeling HS (WV)
- 1930–1944: Bethany (WV)
- 1953–1962: Bethany (WV)

Sprint football
- 1948: Ohio State

Basketball
- 1925–1929: Wheeling HS (WV)
- 1930–?: Bethany (WV)

Baseball
- 1930–1947: Bethany (WV)

Golf
- 1930–1970: Bethany (WV)

Administrative career (AD unless noted)
- 1933–1969: Bethany (WV)
- 1959–1960: NAIA (president)

Head coaching record
- Overall: 66–110–6 (college football)

Accomplishments and honors

Awards
- NAIA Hall of Fame (1963); Bethany (WV) Hall of Fame (1977); West Virginia Wesleyan Hall of Fame

John J. Knight (December 20, 1899 – July 12, 1988) was an American athletic director and college football coach. He was the athletic director for Bethany College from 1933 until his retirement in 1969. He was the head football for Bethany from 1930 to 1944 and from 1953 to 1962.

== Playing career ==
Knight grew up in Grafton, West Virginia, and attended Grafton High School. He played college football, basketball, and baseball for West Virginia Wesleyan. He earned twelve letters while playing for the Bobcats.

== Coaching career ==
In 1923, Knight was the head football coach for Weston High School. In 1925, he served as the head coach for Wheeling High School. In 1930, he earned his first college football head coaching position for Bethany College. He took over following the departure of David C. Morrow. He held the position until 1944. In his first fifteen seasons with the school he produced four winning seasons and a high of 6–2 in 1936, 1940, and 1942. In 1948, Knight was the head football coach for the Ohio State sprint football team. In 1953, he returned to Bethany as their head coach. He coached for ten more seasons and finished his overall career with the Bison with an overall record of 66–110–6. He retired after the 1962 season.

From 1925 to 1929, Knight served as the head basketball coach for Wheeling High School. In 1930, he held the same position for Bethany.

From 1930 to 1947, Knight was the baseball coach for Bethany.

From 1930 to 1970, Knight was the golf coach for Bethany.

== Administrative career ==
In 1933, Knight was hired as the athletic director for Bethany College. He served the position until his retirement following the 1969 school year. From 1959 to 1960 he served as the president of the National Association of Intercollegiate Athletics (NAIA).

== Honors and death ==
Knight is a member of the NAIA, Bethany, and West Virginia Wesleyan halls of fame.

Knight died on July 12, 1988, in San Diego.

== Head coaching record ==
=== College ===
Year	Team	Overall	Conference	Standing	Bowl/playoffs
Bethany Bison (Tri-State Conference / West Virginia Athletic Conference) (1930–1932)
1930	Bethany	0–8	0–3 / 0–2	5th / N/A (Note: Did not qualify for conference standings)	
1931	Bethany	1–6	0–2 / 1–2	4th / N/A	
1932	Bethany	0–5–2	0–3 / 0–2	6th / N/A	
Bethany Bison (Tri-State Conference) (1933)
1933	Bethany	0–5–1	0–3	6th	
Bethany Bison (West Virginia Athletic Conference / West Virginia Intercollegiate Athletic Conference) (1934–1944)
1934	Bethany	1–5		N/A	
1935	Bethany	5–3	1–0	N/A	
1936	Bethany	6–2		N/A	
1937	Bethany	2–6	1–2	N/A	
1938	Bethany	2–6	0–4	9th	
1938	Bethany	3–3–1	1–1–1	N/A	
1940	Bethany	6–2	2–2	5th	
1941	Bethany	0–6–1	0–2–1	N/A	
1942	Bethany	6–2	1–2	N/A	
1943	Bethany	0–6		N/A	
1944	Bethany	1–4		N/A	
Bethany Bison (West Virginia Intercollegiate Athletic Conference) (1953–1961)
1953	Bethany	3–4	1–0	N/A	
1954	Bethany	2–5	1–0	N/A	
1955	Bethany	6–1	2–0	N/A	
1956	Bethany	6–2	2–0	N/A	
1957	Bethany	5–3	1–0	N/A	
1958	Bethany	1–6–1	0–0–1	N/A	
1959	Bethany	1–8	0–1	N/A (Western)	
1960	Bethany	1–6	0–1	N/A (Western)	
1961	Bethany	2–5	0–1	N/A	
Bethany Bison (Presidents' Athletic Conference) (1962)
1962	Bethany	6–1	6–1	2nd	
Bethany:		66–110–6			
Total:		66–110–6			
