= Doug Mooney =

American football and tennis coach (1929–2018)

Biographical details
- Born: January 31, 1929; Bowling Green, Ohio, U.S.
- Died: January 13, 2018 (aged 88); Middleburg Heights, Ohio, U.S.
- Education: Bowling Green State University (1954)

Playing career

Football
- 1946–1947: Bowling Green
- 1948: Pensacola NAS
- 1949–1950: Bowling Green
- 1951–1952: Fort Meade
- Positions: End, defensive end

Coaching career (HC unless noted)

Football
- 1953: Bowling Green (SA)
- 1954: John Marshall HS (OH) (assistant)
- 1955–1956: Case Tech (line)
- 1957–1969: Case Tech

Basketball
- 1953: Bowling Green (SA)
- 1954: John Marshall HS (OH) (assistant)

Tennis
- 1955–1956: Case Tech
- 1970–1988: Case Western Reserve

Head coaching record
- Overall: 18–72–3 (football); 143–62 (tennis dual match)

Accomplishments and honors

Championships
- Tennis; 7 PAC

Douglas Eugene Mooney (January 31, 1929 – January 13, 2018) was an American college football and tennis coach. He was the head football coach for Case Institute of Technology from 1957 until its athletics merged with Western Reserve University in 1969 after the schools had merged in 1967. He was the men's tennis coach for Case Tech, and when it was later known as Case Western Reserve, from 1955 to 1956 and from 1970 to 1988.

== Early life, playing career, and military career ==
Mooney was born on January 31, 1929, to Douglas A. and Agnes Mooney in Bowling Green, Ohio. He attended and played high school football for Bowling Green High School and was a member of the 1945 team that won the Buckeye League. He attended Bowling Green and played college football as an end and defensive end from 1946 to 1947. He earned playing time in his sophomore season after an injury to co-captain Jimmy Knierim. In 1948, He missed the season to serve in the Naval Aviation Cadet Program at the Naval Air Station Pensacola. He returned to Bowling Green in 1949 and remained until 1950. In his senior season he was voted team captain. He suffered rib cartilage separation in October and was replaced in both his offensive and defensive positions by Phil White and Hal Dunham. Mooney was called into the United States Army in 1951 and served until 1953. He played on Fort Meade's football team while serving in the Counterintelligence Corps. He obtained his degree from Bowling Green State University in 1954.

== Coaching career ==
In 1953, Mooney's coaching career began as a student assistant freshman football and basketball coach for his alma mater, Bowling Green. In 1954, he served as an assistant football and basketball coach for John Marshall High School. In 1955, he was hired as the line coach for the Case Tech football team and as the head tennis coach. He served in both roles for two years before being promoted to head football coach and relinquishing his role as head tennis coach in 1957. He led the Rough Riders football team for thirteen seasons and led them to an overall record of 18–72–3. His best year, and his only winning season, came in 1961, as the team finished 4–3 overall. He held the position until 1969 after Case Tech had merged athletics with Western Reserve and Flory Mauriocourt was retained as the now-combined team's head coach.

After Mooney was relieved of his football coaching duties, he returned to be the head tennis coach for Case Western Reserve. As head coach, he helped lead the tennis team to seven Presidents' Athletic Conference (PAC) championships from 1972 to 1979. His 1974 team won all six singles and all three doubles titles in the PAC tournament. He finished with a duel match record of 143–62. He retired from coaching after the 1988 season.

== Personal life and honors ==
Mooney was inducted into the Case Western Reserve Hall of Fame in 1996.

After Mooney graduated from Bowling Green, he served as the president of the City Softball Association in Bowling Green, Ohio. Mooney's son was born in 1952. He died on January 13, 2018, in Middleburg Heights, Ohio, at 88 years old.

== Head coaching record ==
=== Football ===
Year	Team	Overall	Conference	Standing	Bowl/playoffs
Case Tech Rough Riders (Presidents' Athletic Conference) (1957–1969)
1957	Case Tech	0–5–1	0–3	4th	
1958	Case Tech	2–4–1	2–3–1	6th	
1959	Case Tech	1–6	1–4	T–6th	
1960	Case Tech	1–5–1	1–5	T–7th	
1961	Case Tech	4–3	4–2	4th	
1962	Case Tech	1–6	1–6	7th	
1963	Case Tech	2–5	2–5	T–6th	
1964	Case Tech	0–8	0–7	9th	
1965	Case Tech	3–5	2–5	T–8th	
1966	Case Tech	2–5	1–4	T–5th	
1967	Case Tech	0–7	0–5	7th	
1968	Case Tech	0–7	0–6	7th	
1969	Case Tech	2–6	1–5	T–5th	
Case Tech:		18–72–3	15–60–1		
Total:		18–72–3			
