= John R. Chuckran =

American football player and coach, athletic director (1926–1991)

Biographical details
- Born: May 7, 1926; Lansford, Pennsylvania, U.S.
- Died: December 1, 1991 (aged 65); State College, Pennsylvania, U.S.

Playing career
- 1944, 1948–1949: Penn State

Coaching career (HC unless noted)
- 1954–1957: Tyrone HS (PA)
- 1958–1969: Allegheny
- 1970: Penn State (freshmen)
- 1971–1977: Penn State (OL)

Administrative career (AD unless noted)
- 1981–1988: Rhode Island

Head coaching record
- Overall: 51–37–2 (college)

Accomplishments and honors

Championships
- 2 PAC (1961, 1968)

John Richard Chuckran (May 7, 1926 – December 1, 1991) was an American football player, coach, professor of physical education, and college athletics administrator. He served as the head football coach at Allegheny College in Meadville, Pennsylvania for 12 seasons, from 1958 to 1969, compiling a record of 51–37–2 (.578). Chuckran was the as the athletic director at the University of Rhode Island from 1981 to 1988.

Chuckran died at the age of 65 on December 1, 1991, at Centre Community Hospital in State College, Pennsylvania.

== Head coaching record ==
=== College ===
Year	Team	Overall	Conference	Standing	Bowl/playoffs
Allegheny Gators (Presidents' Athletic Conference) (1958–1969)
1958	Allegheny	3–4–1	3–1–1	2nd	
1959	Allegheny	6–2	4–1	T–2nd	
1960	Allegheny	3–3–1	3–3	5th	
1961	Allegheny	6–1	5–1	1st	
1962	Allegheny	2–5	2–3	5th	
1963	Allegheny	4–3	2–3	5th	
1964	Allegheny	3–5	2–4	8th	
1965	Allegheny	3–5	2–4	T–6th	
1966	Allegheny	4–3	3–2	3rd	
1967	Allegheny	5–2	3–2	T–3rd	
1968	Allegheny	7–1	6–0	1st	
1969	Allegheny	5–3	4–2	T–2nd	
Allegheny:		51–37–2	39–26–1		
Total:		51–37–2			
