= 1962 John Carroll Blue Streaks football team =

American college football season

1962 John Carroll Blue Streaks football

PAC champion
- Conference: Presidents' Athletic Conference
- Record: 7–0 (7–0 PAC)
- Head coach: John Ray (4th season)

1962 Presidents' Athletic Conference football standings
	Conf.					Overall
Team	W		L		T	W		L		T
John Carroll $	7	–	0	–	0	7	–	0	–	0
Bethany (WV)	6	–	1	–	0	6	–	1	–	0
Western Reserve	3	–	2	–	1	3	–	3	–	1
Washington & Jefferson	3	–	3	–	0	4	–	3	–	0
Allegheny	2	–	3	–	0	2	–	5	–	0
Thiel	2	–	5	–	0	2	–	5	–	0
Case Tech	1	–	6	–	0	1	–	6	–	0
Wayne State (MI)	0	–	4	–	1	0	–	6	–	1
$ – Conference champion

The 1962 John Carroll Blue Streaks football team was an American football team that represented John Carroll University in the Presidents' Athletic Conference (PAC) during the 1962 NCAA College Division football season. The team compiled a 7–0 record, won the PAC championship, and outscored opponents by a total of 211 to 20.

John Ray was the team's head coach for the fourth year. His assistant coaches included backfield coach Bill Dando and line coach Dave Hurd.

The team set four national defensive records, including holding opponents to (a) an average of minus one yard per game in rushing, (b) an average of one yard per offensive play, minus 0.32 yards per rush.

== Schedule ==
Date	Opponent	Site	Result	Attendance	Source
October 6	at Bethany (WV)	Bethany, WV	W 42–6		
October 13	at Wayne State (MI)	Tartar Field; Detroit, MI	W 67–14	1,304	
October 20	Allegheny	Cleveland, OH	W 26–0		
October 27	Western Reserve	Cleveland, OH	W 7–0	3,100	
November 3	Case Tech	Cleveland, OH	W 44–0		
November 10	Thiel	Cleveland, OH	W 12–0		
November 17	Washington & Jefferson	Washington, PA	W 13–0		
