= 1963 John Carroll Blue Streaks football team =

American college football season

1963 John Carroll Blue Streaks football

PAC champion
- Conference: Presidents' Athletic Conference
- Record: 7–0 (6–0 PAC)
- Head coach: John Ray (5th season)

1963 Presidents' Athletic Conference football standings
	Conf.					Overall
Team	W		L		T	W		L		T
John Carroll $	6	–	0	–	0	7	–	0	–	0
Washington & Jefferson	4	–	2	–	0	5	–	2	–	0
Thiel	4	–	2	–	1	4	–	2	–	1
Wayne State (MI)	3	–	3	–	0	3	–	4	–	0
Allegheny	2	–	3	–	0	4	–	3	–	0
Bethany (WV)	2	–	5	–	0	2	–	5	–	0
Case Tech	2	–	5	–	0	2	–	5	–	0
Western Reserve	1	–	4	–	1	1	–	5	–	1
$ – Conference champion

The 1963 John Carroll Blue Streaks football team was an American football team that represented John Carroll University in the Presidents' Athletic Conference (PAC) during the 1963 NCAA College Division football season. The team compiled a 7–0 record, won the PAC championship, and outscored opponents by a total of 140 to 28. It was the team's second consecutive undefeated season.

John Ray was the team's head coach for the fifth year. In January 1964, he resigned his position with John Carroll to join Ara Parseghian's staff at Notre Dame.

== Schedule ==
Date	Opponent	Site	Result	Attendance	Source
October 5	Bethany (WV)	Cleveland, OH	W 21–6		
October 12	Wayne State (MI)	Cleveland, OH	W 20–0		
October 19	at Ohio Northern*	Ada, OH	W 14–0		
October 26	Western Reserve	Cleveland, OH	W 9–3	2,500	
November 2	Case Tech	Cleveland, OH	W 20–13		
November 9	at Thiel	Greenville, PA	W 42–0	3,500	
November 16	Washington & Jefferson	Cleveland, OH	W 14–6		
*Non-conference game
