= John Ray (American football) =

American football player and coach (1926–2007)

Biographical details
- Born: June 4, 1926; Detroit, Michigan, U.S.
- Died: November 14, 2007 (aged 81); Granger, Indiana, U.S.
- Education: Olivet College (B.A., 1950)

Playing career
- ?: Olivet
- 1944: Notre Dame
- Position: Center

Coaching career (HC unless noted)
- 1955–1958: Detroit (assistant)
- 1959–1963: John Carroll
- 1964–1968: Notre Dame First Asst. Headcoach in the school’s history. Coached the National championship team in 1966.
- 1969–1972: Kentucky
- 1973–1976: Buffalo Bills (DC)

Head coaching record
- Overall: 39–39

Accomplishments and honors

Championships
- 3 PAC (1959, 1962–1963)

Awards
- Olivet College Athletic Hall of Fame (1972)

John W. Ray (June 4, 1926 – November 14, 2007) was an American football player and coach. He served as the head football coach at John Carroll University from 1959 to 1963 and at the University of Kentucky from 1969 to 1972, compiling a career college football record of 39–39.

Ray was a native of Detroit, Michigan and grew up in South Bend, Indiana. He played football at Notre Dame and at Olivet College. After graduating Ray was the head football coach at Sturgis High School and Three Rivers High School, both in Michigan, and then was an assistant coach at the University of Detroit and head coach at John Carroll University from 1959 to 1963.

From 1964 to 1968 Ray served as an assistant coach and defensive coordinator at Notre Dame under Ara Parseghian. He oversaw a 4-4-3 defense that gave up a measly 3.8 points a game in 1966, leading Notre Dame to an undefeated national championship that season.

Ray became the head coach at the University of Kentucky in late 1968, replacing Charlie Bradshaw. In his second game, Kentucky upset quarterback Archie Manning's highly regarded Ole Miss team, which was ranked No. 8 in the AP Poll, by a score of 10–9. Ray also coached the Wildcats to a 16–3 win over No. 13 Kansas State in 1970. The Wildcats also lost close games to ranked teams, such as No. 9 Tennessee (31–26 in 1969), at #5 Ole Miss (20–17, 1970), at No. 15 LSU (14–7, 1970) and No. 12 LSU (17–13, 1971). However, Ray's teams played very solid defense but consistently lacked the players to play well on both sides of the ball. Over his four years as head coach, Kentucky won only 10 games while losing 33. In 1969 Kentucky finished 2–8; in 1970, 2–9; in 1971 and 1972 the Wildcats' final record was 3–8 each season. Ray's contract was not renewed after the 1972 season and he was replaced by Fran Curci.

During Ray's tenure, Kentucky's recruitment of African-American players increased, notably with star running back Sonny Collins. Ray brought more African-American players to Kentucky than any previous coach, and did so at a time when African-American players were rare in the Southeastern Conference. Also during Ray's tenure plans were made and construction undertaken for Commonwealth Stadium, the current home of the Wildcats. While at Kentucky Ray coached future NFL players such as Dave Roller and Joe Federspiel.

After leaving Kentucky Ray was an assistant coach in the NFL including as defensive coordinator for the Buffalo Bills.

Ray died at his home in Granger, Indiana at age 81 on November 14, 2007.

== Head coaching record ==
Year	Team	Overall	Conference	Standing	Bowl/playoffs
John Carroll Blue Streaks (Presidents' Athletic Conference) (1959–1963)
1959	John Carroll	7–0	6–0	1st	
1960	John Carroll	3–4	3–2	T–3rd	
1961	John Carroll	5–2	4–1	2nd	
1962	John Carroll	7–0	7–0	1st	
1963	John Carroll	7–0	6–0	1st	
John Carroll:		29–6	26–3		
Kentucky Wildcats (Southeastern Conference) (1969–1972)
1969	Kentucky	2–8	1–6	9th	
1970	Kentucky	2–9	0–7	10th	
1971	Kentucky	3–8	1–6	T–8th	
1972	Kentucky	3–8	2–5	T–7th	
Kentucky:		10–33	12–30		
Total:		39–39			
National championship Conference title Conference division title or championship game berth
