= 1925 Duquesne Dukes football team =

American college football season

1925 Duquesne Dukes football
- Conference: Tri-State Conference
- Record: 0–7 (0–4 Tri-State)
- Head coach: Frank McDermott (1st season)

1925 Tri-State Conference football standings
	Conf.					Overall
Team	W		L		T	W		L		T
Geneva $	5	–	0	–	0	6	–	3	–	0
Waynesburg	2	–	1	–	1	3	–	5	–	1
Thiel	3	–	2	–	0	4	–	5	–	0
Bethany (WV)	2	–	2	–	1	3	–	4	–	1
Westminster (PA)	1	–	4	–	0	2	–	6	–	0
Duquesne	0	–	4	–	0	0	–	7	–	0
$ – Conference champion

The 1925 Duquesne Dukes football team represented Duquesne University during the 1925 college football season. The head coach was Frank McDermott, coaching his first season with the Dukes.

== Schedule ==
Date	Opponent	Site	Result
October 3	at Bethany (WV)	Wellsburg, WV	L 7–14
October 10	at John Carroll*	Cleveland, OH	L 0–33
October 17	at Davis & Elkins*	Elkins, WV	L 0–54
October 24	Thiel	Pittsburgh, PA	L 0–19
October 30	Salem*	Pittsburgh, PA	L 0–32
November 7	Westminster (PA)	Pittsburgh, PA	L 2–6
November 14	Geneva	Pittsburgh, PA	L 0–7
*Non-conference game
