= 1926 Geneva Covenanters football team =

American college football season

1926 Geneva Covenanters football

Tri-State champion
- Conference: Tri-State Conference
- Record: 8–2 (4–0 Tri-State)
- Head coach: Bo McMillin (2nd season)
- Home stadium: Reeves Field

1926 Tri-State Conference football standings
	Conf.					Overall
Team	W		L		T	W		L		T
Geneva $	4	–	0	–	0	8	–	2	–	0
Bethany (WV)	2	–	1	–	2	2	–	5	–	2
Waynesburg	3	–	2	–	0	5	–	3	–	0
Thiel	2	–	3	–	0	3	–	6	–	0
Duquesne	1	–	3	–	1	2	–	5	–	1
Westminster (PA)	0	–	3	–	1	1	–	4	–	1
$ – Conference champion

The 1926 Geneva Covenanters football team was an American football team that represented Geneva College as a member of the Tri-State Conference during the 1926 college football season. Led by first-year head coach Bo McMillin, the team compiled an overall record of 8–2 with a mark of 4–0 in conference play, winning the Tri-State title.

== Schedule ==
Date	Opponent	Site	Result	Attendance	Source
September 25	at Cornell*	Schoellkopf Field; Ithaca, NY	L 0–6		
October 2	at Harvard*	Harvard Stadium; Boston, MA	W 16–7		
October 9	Duquesne	Reeves Field; Beaver Falls, PA	W 56–0		
October 16	at Canisius*	Buffalo, NY	W 28–9		
October 22	at Waynesburg	Waynesburg, PA	W 20–6		
October 30	Thiel	Reeves Field; Beaver Falls, PA	W 19–0		
November 13	Grove City*	Reeves Field; Beaver Falls, PA	L 0–3		
November 20	Allegheny*	Reeves Field; Beaver Falls, PA	W 15–0		
November 27	Bethany (WV)	Reeves Field; Beaver Falls, PA	W 20–0		
January 1	vs. Oglethorpe*	Jacksonville, FL (Orange Blossom festival)	W 9–7	6,000	
*Non-conference game
