= 1924 Geneva Covenanters football team =

American college football season

1924 Geneva Covenanters football

Tri-State co-champion
- Conference: Tri-State Conference
- Record: 3–4–2 (2–0–1 Tri-State)
- Head coach: Jack Sack (1st season)

1924 Tri-State Conference football standings
	Conf.					Overall
Team	W		L		T	W		L		T
Geneva +	2	–	0	–	1	3	–	4	–	2
Thiel +	2	–	0	–	1	3	–	5	–	1
Westminster (PA)	1	–	2	–	0	4	–	6	–	0
Bethany (WV)	0	–	1	–	0	1	–	7	–	1
Duquesne	0	–	2	–	0	2	–	4	–	2
+ – Conference co-champions

The 1924 Geneva Covenanters football team was an American football team that represented Geneva College as a member of the Tri-State Conference during the 1924 college football season. Led by Jack Sack in his first and only season as head coach, the team compiled an overall record of 3–4–2 with a mark of 2–0–1 in conference play, sharing the Tri-State title with Thiel.

== Schedule ==
Date	Time	Opponent	Site	Result	Attendance	Source
September 27		at Washington & Jefferson*	Washington, PA	L 6–19		
October 4		Waynesburg*	Beaver Falls, PA	L 6–7		
October 11		Bethany (WV)	Beaver Falls, PA	W 10–0		
October 18		West Virginia*	Mountaineer Field; Morgantown, WV	L 0–55		
October 25		St. Bonaventure*	Beaver Falls, PA	W 14–0		
November 1		Thiel	Beaver Falls, PA	T 0–0		
November 8	2:30 p.m.	at Pittsburgh*	Pittsburgh, PA	L 0–13	4,000	
November 15		at Grove City*	Grove City, PA	T 0–0		
November 22		Westminster (PA)	Beaver Falls, PA	W 21–13		
*Non-conference game; All times are in Eastern time
