= 1924 Duquesne Dukes football team =

American college football season

1924 Duquesne Dukes football
- Conference: Tri-State Conference
- Record: 2–4–2 (0–2 Tri-State)
- Head coach: Mike Shortley (1st season)

1924 Tri-State Conference football standings
	Conf.					Overall
Team	W		L		T	W		L		T
Geneva +	2	–	0	–	1	3	–	4	–	2
Thiel +	2	–	0	–	1	3	–	5	–	1
Westminster (PA)	1	–	2	–	0	4	–	6	–	0
Bethany (WV)	0	–	1	–	0	1	–	7	–	1
Duquesne	0	–	2	–	0	2	–	4	–	2
+ – Conference co-champions

The 1924 Duquesne Dukes football team represented Duquesne University during the 1924 college football season. The head coach was Mike Shortley, coaching his first season with the Dukes.

== Schedule ==
Date	Opponent	Site	Result
September 27	Broaddus*	Pittsburgh, PA	T 0–0
October 4	Davis & Elkins*	Pittsburgh, PA	T 0–0
October 11	at Niagara*	Lewiston, NY	W 13–12
October 18	at Dayton*	Dayton, OH	L 0–28
October 25	Salem*	Pittsburgh, PA	W 6–0
November 8	at Thiel	Greenville, PA	L 7–28
November 15	Westminster (PA)	Pittsburgh, PA	L 0–13
November 22	at Mount St. Mary's*	Emmitsburg, MD	L 0–25
*Non-conference game
