= 1925 Geneva Covenanters football team =

American college football season

1925 Geneva Covenanters football

Tri-State champion
- Conference: Tri-State Conference
- Record: 6–3 (5–0 Tri-State)
- Head coach: Bo McMillin (1st season)

1925 Tri-State Conference football standings
	Conf.					Overall
Team	W		L		T	W		L		T
Geneva $	5	–	0	–	0	6	–	3	–	0
Waynesburg	2	–	1	–	1	3	–	5	–	1
Thiel	3	–	2	–	0	4	–	5	–	0
Bethany (WV)	2	–	2	–	1	3	–	4	–	1
Westminster (PA)	1	–	4	–	0	2	–	6	–	0
Duquesne	0	–	4	–	0	0	–	7	–	0
$ – Conference champion

The 1925 Geneva Covenanters football team was an American football team that represented Geneva College as a member of the Tri-State Conference during the 1925 college football season. Led by first-year head coach Bo McMillin, the team compiled an overall record of 6–3 with a mark of 5–0 in conference play, winning the Tri-State title.

== Schedule ==
Date	Opponent	Site	Result	Source
September 26	Washington & Jefferson*	Beaver Falls, PA	L 12–20	
October 3	Westminster (PA)	Beaver Falls, PA	W 24–0	
October 10	Allegheny*	Beaver Falls, PA	L 0–14	
October 17	Adrian*	Beaver Falls, PA	W 21–0	
October 24	Thiel	Beaver Falls, PA	W 12–0	
October 31	Bethany (WV)	Beaver Falls, PA	W 20–0	
November 7	Grove City*	Beaver Falls, PA	L 6–7	
November 14	at Duquesne	Pittsburgh, PA	W 7–0	
November 21	Waynesburg	Beaver Falls, PA	W 10–0	
*Non-conference game
