= Susan Traverso =

American administrator

Susan Traverso is the President of Thiel College. She is their first female President, was officially announced as Thiel College's 20th president on May 17, 2016, took office August 1, 2016 and celebrated her inauguration on May 5, 2017. Traverso was Professor of History at North Central College, and then served as the provost of Elizabethtown College from 2007 to 2016. Her Peace Corps service in Yemen and further service of educational coordinator was of interest to the search committee. She also served in Morocco and Yemen.

President Traverso is also a board of trustees member for the Pittsburgh-based Dietrich Foundation. The Dietrich Foundation's primary mission is to benefit higher education, principally in the greater Pittsburgh area, by providing ongoing and increasing financial support to six educational institutions. The Foundation also distributes funds to nine other charitable beneficiaries in western Pennsylvania.

She previously chaired the board of the Lancaster Symphony Orchestra and was a member of the board of the Pennsylvania College of Art and Design.

== Education ==
She has a bachelor's degree in history and communication from Simmons College (1983) and doctoral and master's degrees in history from the University of Wisconsin-Madison (1989 and 1995).
