= 1961 West Virginia Wesleyan Bobcats football team =

American college football season

1961 West Virginia Wesleyan Bobcats football

WVIAC champion WVIAC Western Division champion

West Virginia Bowl, W 12–0 vs. Salem
- Conference: West Virginia Intercollegiate Athletic Conference
- Western Division
- Record: 8–1 (4–1 WVIAC)
- Head coach: Samuel Ross (4th season)

1961 West Virginia Intercollegiate Athletic Conference football standings
	Conf.					Overall
Team	W		L		T	W		L		T
Eastern Division
Salem x	6	–	2	–	0	6	–	3	–	0
West Liberty State	5	–	2	–	0	6	–	2	–	0
Davis & Elkins	1	–	5	–	0	2	–	5	–	0
West Virginia State	0	–	4	–	0	0	–	7	–	0
Western Division
West Virginia Wesleyan x$	4	–	1	–	0	8	–	1	–	0
Glenville State	5	–	2	–	0	5	–	2	–	0
Fairmont State	4	–	4	–	0	4	–	5	–	0
Concord	3	–	4	–	0	5	–	4	–	0
Potomac State	1	–	3	–	0	2	–	3	–	0
West Virginia Tech	1	–	3	–	0	2	–	5	–	1
Non-qualifiers
Bluefield State	1	–	0	–	0	3	–	3	–	1
Shepherd	1	–	2	–	0	4	–	2	–	2
Bethany (WV)	0	–	1	–	0	2	–	5	–	0
$ – Conference champion; x – Division champion/co-champions; Conference standings based on power ratings

The 1961 West Virginia Wesleyan Bobcats football team was an American football team that represented West Virginia Wesleyan College of Buckhannon, West Virginia, as a member of the West Virginia Intercollegiate Athletic Conference (WVIAC) during the 1961 college football season. In their fourth season under head coach Samuel Ross, the Bobcats compiled an 8–1 record (4–1 in WVIAC games), won the WVIAC championship, and outscored opponents by a total of 243 to 64.

After suffering its only loss to Salem on October 7, the team closed its season with a victory over Salem in the West Virginia Bowl which pitted the WVIAC Eastern and Western Division champions and served as the WVIAC championship game.

== Schedule ==
Date	Opponent	Site	Result	Attendance	Source
September 23	at Mount Union*	Alliance, OH	W 29–6		
September 30	Fairmont State	Buckhannon, WV	W 27–13		
October 7	at Salem	Clarksburg, WV	L 19–20		
October 14	Glenville State	Buckhannon, WV	W 20–6		
October 21	at West Liberty State	West Liberty, WV	W 19–0		
October 28	Bridgewater*	Buckhannon, WV	W 47–12		
November 4	Davis & Elkins	Buckhannon, WV	W 40–7		
November 18	at Bethany (WV)	Bethany, WV	W 30–0		
November 23	at Salem	Clarksburg, WV (West Virginia Bowl)	W 12–0		
*Non-conference game
