= Frank McDermott (American football) =

American football player and coach

Biographical details
- Born: March 9, 1895; Houtzdale, Pennsylvania, U.S.

Playing career
- 1915: Bucknell
- 1917: Bucknell
- 1919: Bucknell
- 1921: Bucknell
- Position: End

Coaching career (HC unless noted)
- ?–1924: Nanticoke HS (PA)
- 1925–1926: Duquesne

Administrative career (AD unless noted)
- 1925–1927: Duquesne

Head coaching record
- Overall: 2–12–1 (college)

Francis P. McDermott (born March 9, 1895) was an American college football player and coach. He served as the head football coach at Duquesne University in Pittsburgh, Pennsylvania from 1925 to 1926, compiling a record of 2–12–1.

== Head coaching record ==
=== College ===
Year	Team	Overall	Conference	Standing	Bowl/playoffs
Duquesne Dukes (Tri-State Conference) (1925–1926)
1925	Duquesne	0–7	0–4	6th	
1926	Duquesne	2–5–1	1–3–1	5th	
Duquesne:		2–12–1	1–7–1		
Total:		2–12–1			
