= Mike Shortley =

American football player and coach (1893–1961)

Biographical details
- Born: October 5, 1893; Port Perry, Pennsylvania, U.S.
- Died: April 28, 1961 (aged 67); Washington, D.C., U.S.

Playing career
- 1913–1915: Duquesne
- 1916: Catholic University
- Positions: Halfback, quarterback

Coaching career (HC unless noted)
- 1924: Duquesne

Head coaching record
- Overall: 2–4–2

Michael Joseph Shortley (October 5, 1893 – April 28, 1961) was an American college football player and coach. He served as the head football coach at Duquesne University in Pittsburgh, Pennsylvania in 1924, compiling a record of 2–4–2. Shortley played college football at Duquesne and the Catholic University of America in Washington, D.C. He later held a number of positions in public service, including at the Social Security Administration and Federal Security Agency. He was buried in Arlington National Cemetery.

== Head coaching record ==
Year	Team	Overall	Conference	Standing	Bowl/playoffs
Duquesne Dukes (Tri-State Conference) (1924)
1924	Duquesne	2–4–2	0–2	T–4th	
Duquesne:		2–4–2	0–2		
Total:		2–4–2			
