= Elmer Layden =

American football player, coach, executive (1903–1973)

- Layden, c. 1935
- Born: May 4, 1903; Davenport, Iowa, U.S.
- Died: June 30, 1973 (aged 70); Chicago, Illinois, U.S.
- Coaching career

Biographical details
- Education: University of Notre Dame

Playing career

Football
- 1922–1924: Notre Dame
- 1925: Hartford Blues
- 1926: Brooklyn Horsemen
- 1926: Rock Island Independents

Basketball
- 1922–1923: Notre Dame
- Position: Fullback (football)

Coaching career (HC unless noted)

Football
- 1925–1926: Columbia (IA)
- 1927–1933: Duquesne
- 1934–1940: Notre Dame

Basketball
- 1925–1927: Columbia (IA)

Administrative career (AD unless noted)
- 1927–1933: Duquesne
- 1934–1940: Notre Dame

Head coaching record
- Overall: 103–34–11 (football)

Accomplishments and honors

Championships
- As a coach: 2× Tri-State (1928, 1929); As a player: National (1924)

Awards
- Consensus All-American (1924)
- College Football Hall of Fame; Inducted in 1951 (profile)

1st Commissioner of the NFL
- In office February 3, 1941 – January 11, 1946
- Preceded by: Carl Storck
- Succeeded by: Bert Bell

Elmer Francis Layden (May 4, 1903 – June 30, 1973) was an American football player, coach, college athletics administrator, and professional sports executive. He played college football for the Notre Dame Fighting Irish where he starred at fullback as a member of the legendary "Four Horsemen" backfield.

Layden played professionally in the original AFL in 1925 and 1926 with three clubs, the Hartford Blues, the Brooklyn Horsemen, and the Rock Island Independents.

He began his coaching career during the same two seasons at Columbia College in Dubuque, Iowa, now known as Loras College. Layden then served as the head coach at Duquesne University from 1927 to 1933 and at his alma mater, Notre Dame, from 1934 to 1940, where he also held the position of athletic director.

From 1941 to 1946, Layden was the commissioner of the National Football League (NFL). He was inducted into the College Football Hall of Fame as a player in 1951.

== Playing career ==
Layden (second from left) was a member of the legendary "Four Horsemen of Notre Dame" backfield of 1924.

Elmer Layden was born in Davenport, Iowa, where he attended Davenport High School. At Notre Dame, he played fullback alongside quarterback Harry Stuhldreher, left halfback Jim Crowley, and right halfback Don Miller; the four collectively earned the nickname of "The Four Horsemen of Notre Dame" from legendary sportswriter Grantland Rice, and are still considered one of the best backfields in college football history.

Named an All-American during his senior year, Layden culminated his collegiate career in the 1925 Rose Bowl against Stanford, returning two interceptions for touchdowns in Notre Dame's 27–10 victory.

The Four Horsemen were reunited for a professional football game in 1925 by the Hartford Blues as they played the Cleveland Bulldogs. The game though resulted in a 13–6 Hartford loss, with the Blues reportedly spending $5,000 on the Horsemen for just one game.

== Coaching career ==
After his playing days, Layden was head football coach at Columbia College (Dubuque, Iowa) in 1925–26, where he compiled an 8–5–2 record. From 1927 to 1933 he was head coach at Duquesne University in Pittsburgh, going 48–16–6 and winning the 1933 season's Festival of Palms Bowl (a precursor to the Orange Bowl) on New Year's Day, 1934.

Also in 1934, he became head coach and athletic director at Notre Dame, three years after his legendary mentor Knute Rockne was killed in an airplane crash on March 31, 1931.

Layden led the Irish for seven years and posted an overall 47–13–3 docket. His 1935 squad posted one of the greatest wins in school history by rallying to defeat Ohio State 18–13. His 1938 team finished 8–1, losing only to USC in the season finale. This loss cost them a possible consensus national championship, but the team was named national champion by the Dickinson System.

Like Rockne before him, Layden was a goodwill ambassador for Notre Dame. He was able to schedule a home-and-home series with Michigan after meeting with Fielding H. Yost, healing a rift between the two schools. The two teams had not met since 1909, when, after eight straight losses to the Wolverines, the Irish posted their first win. They were scheduled to meet again in 1910, but Michigan canceled the game and refused to play the Irish again. By the time they met again in 1942–43, Layden had left Notre Dame and Frank Leahy had taken his place. Unlike the easygoing Layden, Leahy was intense, and after the Irish had thrashed Michigan by a score of 35–12 in 1943, Wolverine coach and athletic director Fritz Crisler never scheduled the Irish again.

While Layden was a solid, competent coach, he was subjected to criticism during his later years at Notre Dame. Critics felt that his teams played too conservatively and lacked scoring punch. Consequently, it was felt that they lost games they should have won. In seven years as head coach at Notre Dame, Layden compiled a .770 winning percentage.

== Commissioner ==
Layden as NFL Commissioner in 1941.

In 1941, the National Football League franchise owners voted to change the league's constitution in an attempt to bring all professional football leagues under the authority of one commissioner, who would have similar powers to that of Commissioner of Baseball Kenesaw Mountain Landis. Chicago Tribune journalist Arch Ward was offered the position of commissioner, but he turned it down and suggested Elmer Layden for the position.

Layden was appointed commissioner in February 1941. His appointment was not voted on by the entire league, which upset owners Alexis Thompson, Bert Bell, and Dan Topping. Chicago Bears owner George Halas contended that Layden's hiring was legal because it had been agreed upon by a majority of owners. Layden was signed to a five-year contract with an annual salary of $20,000.

In five years as Commissioner, Layden saw the NFL through the World War II years, in which teams had to use many men of inferior abilities as replacements while most of the regulars were fighting in the war (as did Major League Baseball). During this period a few teams temporarily merged due to lack of manpower, most notably the Pittsburgh Steelers with the Philadelphia Eagles (who were nicknamed the Steagles). The Cleveland Rams ceased operations for the 1943 season.

As NFL commissioner, Layden had once conducted an investigation into a betting scam, without advising the owners, which did not reveal any conspiracy.

At the end of the war, after Japan announced it would surrender, NFL Commissioner Elmer Layden called for all of the league's teams to play "The Star-Spangled Banner" at their games, arguing, "The National Anthem should be as much a part of every game as the kick-off. We must not drop it simply because the war is over. We should never forget what it stands for." Prior to this proclamation "The Star-Spangled Banner" had not been officially required to be sung before the start of any NFL games.

Layden's tenure as NFL commissioner came to an end in January 1946. After Brooklyn owner Dan Topping withdrew his team from the league to join the new All-America Football Conference, the remaining owners agreed not to renew Layden's contract, feeling that he was too much of a gentleman and not forceful enough. Layden was succeeded by Bert Bell.

== Later years ==
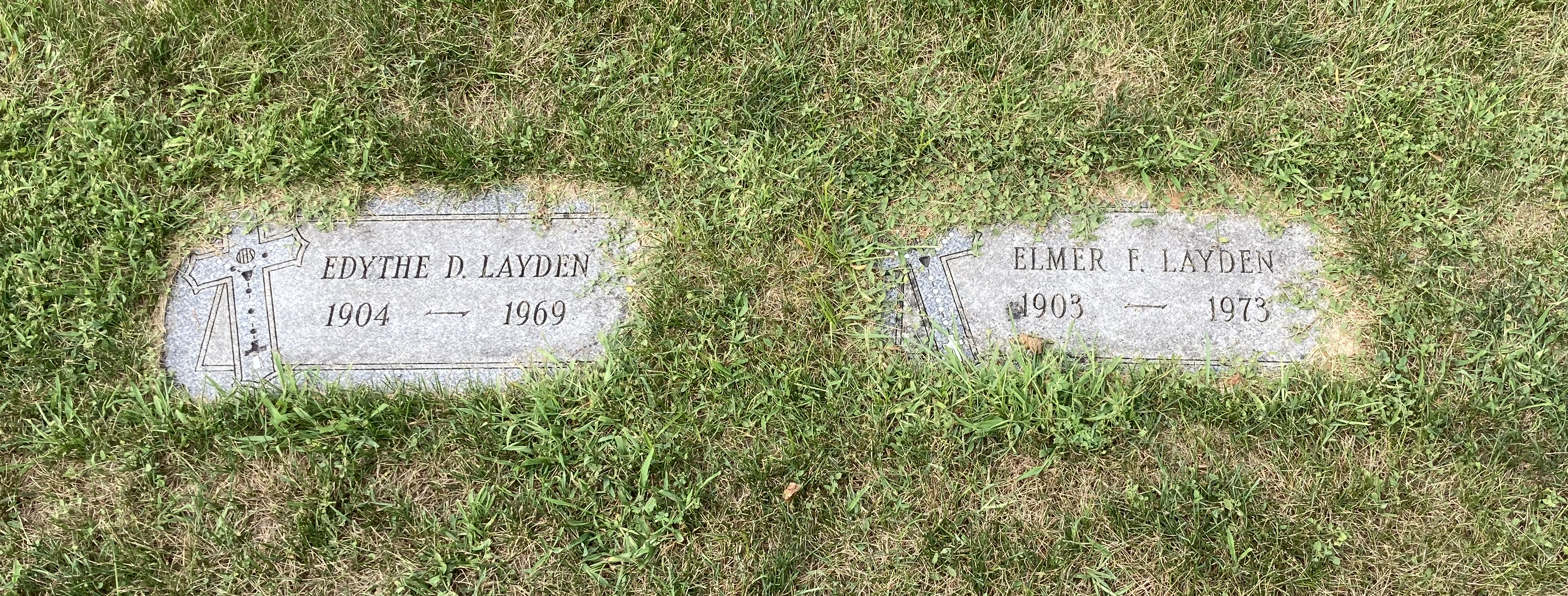
Graves of Elmer and Edythe Layden at Calvary Cemetery

After leaving the NFL, Layden embarked on a successful business career in Chicago, where he died at the age of 70. He was buried at Calvary Cemetery in Evanston.

He was inducted into the College Football Hall of Fame in 1951 as a charter member.

== Personal life ==
Layden married Edythe Davis on October 25, 1926, who preceded him in death.

== Head coaching record ==
Year	Team	Overall	Conference	Standing	Bowl/playoffs	AP^{#}
Columbia Duhawks (Independent) (1925–1926)
1925	Columbia	4–3–1				
1926	Columbia	4–2–1				
Columbia:		8–5–2				
Duquesne Dukes (Tri-State Conference) (1927–1929)
1927	Duquesne	4–4–1	2–2–1	T–2nd		
1928	Duquesne	8–1	4–1	T–1st		
1929	Duquesne	9–0–1	3–0	1st		
Duquesne Dukes (Independent) (1930–1933)
1930	Duquesne	6–3				
1931	Duquesne	3–5–3				
1932	Duquesne	7–2–1				
1933	Duquesne	10–1			W Festival of Palms	
Duquesne:		48–16–6	9–3–1			
Notre Dame Fighting Irish (Independent) (1934–1940)
1934	Notre Dame	6–3				
1935	Notre Dame	7–1–1				
1936	Notre Dame	6–2–1				8
1937	Notre Dame	6–2–1				9
1938	Notre Dame	8–1				5
1939	Notre Dame	7–2				13
1940	Notre Dame	7–2				
Notre Dame:		47–13–3				
Total:		103–34–11				
National championship Conference title Conference division title or championship game berth
^{#}Rankings from final AP Poll.

== Sources ==
- Davis, Jeff (2005). Papa Bear, The Life and Legacy of George Halas. New York: McGraw-Hill ISBN 0-07-146054-3
- DeVito, Carlo (2006). Wellington: the Maras, the Giants, and the City of New York. Chicago: Triumph Books. ISBN 978-1-57243-872-9
- Layden, Elmer; with Snyder, Ed (1969). It Was a Different Game: The Elmer Layden Story. Englewood Cliffs, New Jersey:Prentice-Hall, Inc.
- Littlewood, Thomas B. (1990). Arch : a promoter, not a poet : the story of Arch Ward. Ames, IA: Iowa State University Press. ISBN 0-8138-0277-6
- Lyons, Robert S. (2010). On Any Given Sunday, A Life of Bert Bell. Philadelphia: Temple University Press. ISBN 978-1-59213-731-2
- MacCambridge, Michael (2005). America's Game. New York: Anchor Books ISBN 978-0-307-48143-6
- Piascik, Andy (2007). The Best Show in Football: The 1946–1955 Cleveland Browns. Lanham, Maryland: Taylor Trade Publishing. ISBN 978-1-58979-360-6
- Peterson, Robert W. (1997). Pigskin: The Early Years of Pro Football. New York: Oxford University Press. ISBN 0-19-507607-9
- Pervin, Lawrence A. (2009). Football's New York Giants. Jefferson, North Carolina: McFarland and Company, Inc. ISBN 978-0-7864-4268-3
- Willis, Chris (2010). The Man Who Built the National Football League: Joe F. Carr. Lanham, Maryland: Scarecrow Press, Inc. ISBN 978-0-8108-7669-9
