= 1926 Duquesne Dukes football team =

American college football season

1926 Duquesne Dukes football
- Conference: Tri-State Conference
- Record: 2–5–1 (1–3–1 Tri-State)
- Head coach: Frank McDermott (2nd season)

1926 Tri-State Conference football standings
	Conf.					Overall
Team	W		L		T	W		L		T
Geneva $	4	–	0	–	0	8	–	2	–	0
Bethany (WV)	2	–	1	–	2	2	–	5	–	2
Waynesburg	3	–	2	–	0	5	–	3	–	0
Thiel	2	–	3	–	0	3	–	6	–	0
Duquesne	1	–	3	–	1	2	–	5	–	1
Westminster (PA)	0	–	3	–	1	1	–	4	–	1
$ – Conference champion

The 1926 Duquesne Dukes football team represented Duquesne University during the 1926 college football season. The head coach was Frank McDermott, coaching his first season with the Dukes.

== Schedule ==
Date	Opponent	Site	Result
September 24	Westminster (PA)	Pittsburgh, PA	W 13–0
October 2	at Juniata*	Huntingdon, PA	W 30–6
October 9	at Geneva	Beaver Falls, PA	L 0–56
October 16	Saint Francis (PA)*	Pittsburgh, PA	L 0–13
October 23	at Thiel	Greenville, PA	L 0–7
October 30	Bethany (WV)	Pittsburgh, PA	T 0–0
November 11	at Waynesburg	Waynesburg, PA	L 0–13
November 20	Ashland*	Pittsburgh, PA	L 10–13
*Non-conference game
