= 1928 Washington & Jefferson Presidents football team =

American college football season

1928 Washington & Jefferson Presidents football
- Conference: Independent
- Record: 2–5–2
- Head coach: Andrew Kerr (3rd season)

1928 Eastern college football independents records
	Conf.			Overall
Team	W	L	T	W		L		T
Boston College		–		9	–	0	–	0
West Chester		–		8	–	0	–	0
Villanova		–		7	–	0	–	1
Brown		–		8	–	1	–	0
No. 11 Penn		–		8	–	1	–	0
No. 6 Carnegie Tech		–		7	–	1	–	0
No. 9 Army		–		8	–	2	–	0
Drexel		–		8	–	2	–	0
No. 10 NYU		–		8	–	2	–	0
Temple		–		7	–	1	–	2
Lafayette		–		6	–	1	–	2
Princeton		–		5	–	1	–	2
CCNY		–		4	–	1	–	2
Pittsburgh		–		6	–	2	–	1
Harvard		–		5	–	2	–	1
Tufts		–		5	–	2	–	1
Colgate		–		6	–	3	–	0
Rutgers		–		6	–	3	–	0
Bucknell		–		5	–	2	–	3
Columbia		–		5	–	3	–	1
Boston University		–		3	–	3	–	2
Cornell		–		3	–	3	–	2
Syracuse		–		4	–	4	–	1
Yale		–		4	–	4	–	0
Fordham		–		4	–	5	–	0
Franklin & Marshall		–		4	–	5	–	0
Penn State		–		3	–	5	–	1
Lehigh		–		3	–	6	–	0
Washington & Jefferson		–		2	–	5	–	2
Providence		–		1	–	5	–	3
Vermont		–		1	–	7	–	2
Rankings from Dickinson System

The 1928 Washington & Jefferson Presidents football team was an American football team that represented Washington & Jefferson College as an independent during the 1928 college football season. The team compiled a 2–5–2 record and was outscored by a total of 117 to 67. Andrew Kerr was the head coach.

== Schedule ==
Date	Opponent	Site	Result	Attendance	Source
September 29	Bethany (WV)	Washington, PA	W 24–0		
October 6	Waynesburg	Washington, PA	W 24–0		
October 13	Duquesne	College Field; Washington, PA	L 6–12		
October 20	at Carnegie Tech	Forbes Field; Pittsburgh, PA	L 0–19		
October 27	at Fordham	Polo Grounds; New York, NY	L 0–34		
November 3	at Lafayette	Fisher Field; Easton, PA	T 13–13		
November 10	at Pittsburgh	Pitt Stadium; Pittsburgh, PA	L 0–25	14,000	
November 17	Bucknell	Washington, PA	T 0–0		
November 29	at West Virginia	Mountaineer Field; Morgantown, WV	L 0–14	19,000	
