= 1927 Geneva Covenanters football team =

American college football season

1927 Geneva Covenanters football

Tri-State champion
- Conference: Tri-State Conference
- Record: 8–0–1 (4–0 Tri-State)
- Head coach: Bo McMillin (3rd season)

1927 Tri-State Conference football standings
| | Conf. | | | | | Overall |
| Team | W | | L | | T | W | | L | | T |
|---|---|---|---|---|---|---|---|---|---|---|
| Geneva $ | 4 | – | 0 | – | 0 | 8 | – | 0 | – | 1 |
| Duquesne | 2 | – | 2 | – | 1 | 4 | – | 4 | – | 1 |
| Westminster (PA) | 1 | – | 1 | – | 1 | 2 | – | 3 | – | 2 |
| Bethany (WV) | 1 | – | 1 | – | 1 | 1 | – | 6 | – | 1 |
| Waynesburg | 1 | – | 2 | – | 2 | 1 | – | 5 | – | 3 |
| Thiel | 0 | – | 3 | – | 1 | 1 | – | 7 | – | 1 |
$ – Conference champion

The 1927 Geneva Covenanters football team was an American football team that represented Geneva College as a member of the Tri-State Conference during the 1927 college football season. Led by Bo McMillin in his third and final year as head coach, the team compiled an overall record of 8–0–1 with a mark of 4–0 in conference play, winning the Tri-State title.

== Schedule ==
| Date | Opponent | Site | Result | Attendance | Source |
|---|---|---|---|---|---|
| September 24 | Davis & Elkins* | Reeves Field; Beaver Falls, PA | W 21–0 | | |
| October 1 | at Bucknell* | Christy Mathewson–Memorial Stadium; Lewisburg, PA | T 0–0 | | |
| October 8 | at Duquesne | Pittsburgh, PA | W 20–0 | | |
| October 12 | at Boston College* | Braves Field; Boston, MA | W 13–0 | 18,000 | |
| October 22 | Waynesburg | Reeves Field; Beaver Falls, PA | W 12–6 | | |
| October 29 | Bethany (WV) | Reeves Field; Beaver Falls, PA | W 46–6 | | |
| November 5 | Grove City* | Reeves Field; Beaver Falls, PA | W 13–0 | | |
| November 12 | at Allegheny* | Meadville, PA | W 39–7 | | |
| November 19 | Thiel | Reeves Field; Beaver Falls, PA | W 67–6 | | |
*Non-conference game
