= 1928 Duquesne Dukes football team =

American college football season

1928 Duquesne Dukes football

Tri-State co-champion
- Conference: Tri-State Conference
- Record: 8–1 (4–1 Tri-State)
- Head coach: Elmer Layden (2nd season)

1928 Tri-State Conference football standings
	Conf.					Overall
Team	W		L		T	W		L		T
Duquesne +	4	–	1	–	0	8	–	1	–	0
Westminster (PA) +	4	–	1	–	0	4	–	5	–	0
Geneva	3	–	1	–	0	5	–	5	–	0
Bethany (WV)	0	–	2	–	1	1	–	6	–	1
Thiel	0	–	3	–	1	1	–	6	–	2
Waynesburg	0	–	3	–	1	0	–	6	–	2
+ – Conference co-champions

The 1928 Duquesne Dukes football team represented Duquesne University as a member of the Tri-State Conference during the 1928 college football season. Led by second-year head coach Elmer Layden, the Dukes compiled an overall record of 8–1 with mark of 4–1 in conference play, sharing the Tri-State title with the Westminster Titans.

== Schedule ==
Date	Opponent	Site	Result	Attendance	Source
September 29	Slippery Rock*	Pittsburgh, PA	W 9–0		
October 6	at St. Thomas (PA)*	Scranton, PA	W 10–0		
October 13	at Washington & Jefferson*	College Field; Washington, PA	W 12–6		
October 20	Loyola (MD)*	Pittsburgh, PA	W 6–0		
October 27	at Geneva	Beaver Falls, PA	L 0–7		
November 3	Westminster (PA)	Pittsburgh, PA	W 20–6		
November 17	Thiel	Pittsburgh, PA	W 13–7		
November 24	Bethany (WV)	Pittsburgh, PA	W 13–6		
November 29	Waynesburg	Pittsburgh, PA	W 35–0		
*Non-conference game
