= 1927 Duquesne Dukes football team =

American college football season

1927 Duquesne Dukes football
- Conference: Tri-State Conference
- Record: 4–4–1 (2–2–1 Tri-State)
- Head coach: Elmer Layden (1st season)

1927 Tri-State Conference football standings
	Conf.					Overall
Team	W		L		T	W		L		T
Geneva $	4	–	0	–	0	8	–	0	–	1
Duquesne	2	–	2	–	1	4	–	4	–	1
Westminster (PA)	1	–	1	–	1	2	–	3	–	2
Bethany (WV)	1	–	1	–	1	1	–	6	–	1
Waynesburg	1	–	2	–	2	1	–	5	–	3
Thiel	0	–	3	–	1	1	–	7	–	1
$ – Conference champion

The 1927 Duquesne Dukes football team represented Duquesne University during the 1927 college football season. The head coach was Elmer Layden, coaching his first season with the Dukes.

== Schedule ==
Date	Opponent	Site	Result
September 24	at St. Bonaventure*	Olean, NY	L 0–13
September 30	Broaddus*	Pittsburgh, PA	W 33–0
October 8	Geneva	Pittsburgh, PA	L 0–20
October 15	at Bethany (WV)	Bethany, WV	T 7–7
October 21	Thiel	Pittsburgh, PA	W 8–7
October 29	at Westminster (PA)	New Wilmington, PA	W 10–0
November 5	at Saint Francis (PA)*	Johnstown, PA	W 12–0
November 11	Waynesburg	Pittsburgh, PA	L 0–18
November 19	at Ashland*	Ashland, OH	L 12–13
*Non-conference game
