= Tri-State Conference (1923–1934) =

The Tri-State Conference was an intercollegiate athletic conference that existed from 1923 to 1934 and one of two conferences to share this name. The league had members in the Tri-State region of Ohio, Pennsylvania, and West Virginia.

== Football champions ==
- 1924 – Geneva and Thiel
- 1925 – Geneva
- 1926 – Geneva
- 1927 – Geneva
- 1928 – Duquesne and Westminster (PA)
- 1929 – Duquesne
- 1930 – Geneva
- 1931 – Geneva
- 1932 – Waynesburg
- 1933 – Geneva

== Yearly football standings ==
1924 Tri-State Conference football standings
	Conf.					Overall
Team	W		L		T	W		L		T
Geneva +	2	–	0	–	1	3	–	4	–	2
Thiel +	2	–	0	–	1	3	–	5	–	1
Westminster (PA)	1	–	2	–	0	4	–	6	–	0
Bethany (WV)	0	–	1	–	0	1	–	7	–	1
Duquesne	0	–	2	–	0	2	–	4	–	2
+ – Conference co-champions

1925 Tri-State Conference football standings
	Conf.					Overall
Team	W		L		T	W		L		T
Geneva $	5	–	0	–	0	6	–	3	–	0
Waynesburg	2	–	1	–	1	3	–	5	–	1
Thiel	3	–	2	–	0	4	–	5	–	0
Bethany (WV)	2	–	2	–	1	3	–	4	–	1
Westminster (PA)	1	–	4	–	0	2	–	6	–	0
Duquesne	0	–	4	–	0	0	–	7	–	0
$ – Conference champion

1926 Tri-State Conference football standings
	Conf.					Overall
Team	W		L		T	W		L		T
Geneva $	4	–	0	–	0	8	–	2	–	0
Bethany (WV)	2	–	1	–	2	2	–	5	–	2
Waynesburg	3	–	2	–	0	5	–	3	–	0
Thiel	2	–	3	–	0	3	–	6	–	0
Duquesne	1	–	3	–	1	2	–	5	–	1
Westminster (PA)	0	–	3	–	1	1	–	4	–	1
$ – Conference champion

1927 Tri-State Conference football standings
	Conf.					Overall
Team	W		L		T	W		L		T
Geneva $	4	–	0	–	0	8	–	0	–	1
Duquesne	2	–	2	–	1	4	–	4	–	1
Westminster (PA)	1	–	1	–	1	2	–	3	–	2
Bethany (WV)	1	–	1	–	1	1	–	6	–	1
Waynesburg	1	–	2	–	2	1	–	5	–	3
Thiel	0	–	3	–	1	1	–	7	–	1
$ – Conference champion

1928 Tri-State Conference football standings
	Conf.					Overall
Team	W		L		T	W		L		T
Duquesne +	4	–	1	–	0	8	–	1	–	0
Westminster (PA) +	4	–	1	–	0	4	–	5	–	0
Geneva	3	–	1	–	0	5	–	5	–	0
Bethany (WV)	0	–	2	–	1	1	–	6	–	1
Thiel	0	–	3	–	1	1	–	6	–	2
Waynesburg	0	–	3	–	1	0	–	6	–	2
+ – Conference co-champions

1929 Tri-State Conference football standings
	Conf.					Overall
Team	W		L		T	W		L		T
Duquesne $	3	–	0	–	0	9	–	0	–	1
Thiel	2	–	1	–	0	2	–	5	–	2
Waynesburg	2	–	2	–	0	5	–	4	–	0
Westminster (PA)	2	–	2	–	0	3	–	4	–	0
Geneva	1	–	3	–	0	2	–	6	–	1
Bethany (WV)	0	–	2	–	0	1	–	7	–	0
$ – Conference champion

1930 Tri-State Conference football standings
	Conf.					Overall
Team	W		L		T	W		L		T
Geneva $	3	–	0	–	0	9	–	1	–	0
Thiel	2	–	1	–	0	3	–	6	–	0
Waynesburg	1	–	1	–	0	2	–	7	–	0
Westminster (PA)	1	–	2	–	0	4	–	5	–	0
Bethany (WV)	0	–	3	–	0	0	–	8	–	0
$ – Conference champion

1931 Tri-State Conference football standings
	Conf.					Overall
Team	W		L		T	W		L		T
Geneva $	3	–	0	–	0	6	–	2	–	2
Waynesburg	2	–	1	–	0	3	–	3	–	2
Thiel	2	–	1	–	0	4	–	5	–	0
Bethany (WV)	0	–	2	–	0	1	–	6	–	0
Westminster (PA)	0	–	3	–	0	3	–	6	–	0
$ – Conference champion

1932 Tri-State Conference football standings
	Conf.					Overall
Team	W		L		T	W		L		T
Waynesburg $	4	–	0	–	0	8	–	1	–	0
Geneva	3	–	1	–	0	7	–	3	–	0
Westminster (PA)	2	–	2	–	0	4	–	6	–	0
Grove City	2	–	3	–	0	3	–	5	–	1
Thiel	1	–	3	–	0	3	–	6	–	0
Bethany (WV)	0	–	3	–	0	0	–	5	–	2
$ – Conference champion

1933 Tri-State Conference football standings
	Conf.					Overall
Team	W		L		T	W		L		T
Geneva $	4	–	0	–	0	7	–	3	–	0
Grove City	4	–	1	–	0	6	–	1	–	1
Thiel	2	–	3	–	0	3	–	4	–	0
Westminster (PA)	1	–	2	–	0	2	–	6	–	0
Waynesburg	1	–	3	–	0	2	–	7	–	0
Bethany (WV)	0	–	3	–	0	0	–	5	–	1
$ – Conference champion

== See also ==
- List of defunct college football conferences
