= Presidents' Athletic Conference =

US NCAA Division III athletic conference of small private colleges

- Association: NCAA
- Founded: 1955
- Commissioner: Joe Onderko (since 2006)
- Sports fielded: 24; men's: 13; women's: 12
- Division: Division III
- No. of teams: 13
- Headquarters: New Wilmington, Pennsylvania
- Region: Appalachia
- Website: pacathletics.org

Locations

The Presidents' Athletic Conference (PAC) is an intercollegiate athletic conference which competes in the NCAA's Division III. Of its 13 member schools, all private, liberal arts institutions of higher learning, 10 are located in Western Pennsylvania. The other three are located in adjacent areas, historically tied to Western Pennsylvania—Appalachian Ohio, Northeast Ohio, and the Northern Panhandle of West Virginia.

== History ==
The PAC was founded in 1955 by the presidents of Western Reserve University (1955–1967, operating athletically as Adelbert College from 1967 to 1970), Case Institute of Technology (1955–1970), John Carroll University (1955–1989) and Wayne State University (1955–1967). Unlike other conferences of the time, the PAC was designed to be supervised by the presidents of the institutions rather than the athletic directors. Member institutions were to admit athletes on the same academic standards as other students and award scholarships based only on academic achievement or need.

By 1958, the PAC expanded east to include Allegheny College (1958–1984, 2022–), Bethany College (1958–), Thiel College (1958–) and Washington & Jefferson College (1958–). Eventually, many other member institutions joined the PAC, like Chatham University (2007–), Geneva College (2007–), Grove City College (1984–), Saint Vincent College (2006–), Thomas More College (2005–2018), Waynesburg University (1990–) and Westminster College (2000–).

Some former PAC member institutions are Alfred University (1996–1998), Carnegie Mellon University (1968–1990), Eastern Michigan University (1962–1967) and Hiram College (1971–1989, returning in 2025). On May 31, 2017, Thomas More College (University), announced its withdrawal from the PAC at the conclusion of the 2017–18 school year.

In April 2019, Franciscan University, which had joined the PAC as an associate member in the newly launched conference sports of men's and women's lacrosse for the 2018–19 school year, was unveiled as the effective replacement for Thomas More. Franciscan added five sports to its PAC membership for 2019–20—women's golf, men's and women's indoor track & field, and men's and women's outdoor track & field, and became a full conference member in 2020–21.

Effective July 1, 2022, Allegheny College rejoined the PAC after a 38-year absence spent in the North Coast Athletic Conference (NCAC). Allegheny remains an affiliate member of the NCAC in the sport of field hockey as the PAC does not sponsor the sport.

On December 14, 2022, the PAC announced that it would add men's volleyball starting in 2024–25. At the time of announcement, the men's volleyball league was planned to start with six full members. Geneva, Saint Vincent, and Thiel were associate members of the Allegheny Mountain Collegiate Conference; Bethany and Chatham were committed to adding men's volleyball in 2023–24; and Grove City was to add men's volleyball in 2024–25.

On June 6, 2023, the PAC announced that its future men's volleyball league would also include former full member Hiram as a single-sport member for the 2025 spring season.

On April 23, 2024, the PAC announced that Hiram would return to full PAC membership after an absence of 35 years. It joined for administrative purposes on July 1 of that year, coinciding with its becoming a men's volleyball associate member, but will not start conference competition in other sports until 2025–26.

On Sept. 9, 2024, Carnegie Mellon announced that it will leave the PAC to join the Centennial Conference as an associate football member in time for the 2025 fall season.

On March 25, 2025, the PAC announced that Saint Francis University would be reclassifying from the Division I ranks and the Northeast Conference and will compete in the PAC effective July 1, 2026. Saint Francis joined for administrative purposes on July 1, 2025, but will not be eligible for the NCAA tournaments until the 2029–30 academic year.

The headquarters is located in New Wilmington, Pennsylvania.

=== Timeline ===
Presidents' Athletic Conference
Location of PAC members: full, affiliate
- 1955 – In 1955, the Presidents' Athletic Conference (PAC) was founded. Charter members included Case Institute of Technology, John Carroll University, Wayne University (now Wayne State University) and Western Reserve University, beginning the 1955–56 academic year.
- 1958 – Allegheny College, Bethany College of West Virginia, Thiel College and Washington & Jefferson College joined the PAC in the 1958–59 academic year.
- 1962 – Eastern Michigan University joined the PAC in the 1962–63 academic year.
- 1967:
  - Eastern Michigan and Wayne State left the PAC after the 1966–67 academic year.
  - Case Tech and Western Reserve merged to form the newly named institution as Case Western Reserve University, beginning the 1967–68 academic year. The undergraduate student bodies remained separate, however, and both Case Tech and Adelbert College (the male undergraduate school of the former Western Reserve University) continued to field separate teams.
- 1968 – Carnegie Mellon University joined the PAC in the 1968–69 academic year.
- 1970:
  - Case Tech and Western Reserve left the PAC after the 1969–70 academic year.
  - Case Western Reserve University joined the PAC in the 1970–71 academic year.
- 1971 – Hiram College joined the PAC in the 1971–72 academic year.
- 1984:
  - Allegheny and Case Western Reserve left the PAC to join part of forming the North Coast Athletic Conference (NCAC) after the 1983–84 academic year.
  - Grove City College joined the PAC in the 1984–85 academic year.
  - The PAC sponsors women's athletic championships for the first time, beginning the 1984–85 academic year.
- 1989 – John Carroll and Hiram left the PAC to join the Ohio Athletic Conference (OAC) after the 1988–89 academic year.
- 1990:
  - Carnegie Mellon left the PAC to fully align with the University Athletic Association (UAA) after the 1989–90 academic year.
  - Waynesburg College (now Waynesburg University) joined the PAC in the 1990–91 academic year.
- 1996 – Alfred University joined the PAC in the 1996–97 academic year.
- 1998 – Alfred left the PAC to join the Empire Athletic Association (now the Empire 8 Athletic Conference or Empire 8) after the 1997–98 academic year.
- 2000 – Westminster College of Pennsylvania joined the PAC in the 2000–01 academic year.
- 2005 – Thomas More College (now Thomas More University) joined the PAC in the 2005–06 academic year.
- 2006 – Saint Vincent College joined the PAC in the 2006–07 academic year.
- 2007 – Geneva College and Chatham University joined the PAC in the 2007–08 academic year.
- 2014 – Carnegie Mellon and Case Western Reserve rejoined the PAC as affiliate members for football in the 2014 fall season (2014–15 academic year).
- 2018:
  - Thomas More left the PAC to join the American Collegiate Athletic Association (ACAA) after the 2017–18 academic year. It was an ACAA member for only one season, as it returned to the National Association of Intercollegiate Athletics (NAIA), primarily as a member of the Mid-South Conference (MSC), during the 2019–20 school year.
  - Franciscan University of Steubenville joined the PAC as an affiliate member for men's and women's lacrosse in the 2019 spring season (2018–19 academic year).
- 2019 – Franciscan added women's golf plus men's and women's indoor and outdoor track & field into its PAC affiliate membership in the 2019–20 academic year.
- 2020 – Franciscan upgraded as a full member of the PAC for all sports in the 2020–21 academic year.
- 2022 – Allegheny rejoined the PAC in the 2022–23 academic year.
- 2024:
  - Hiram rejoined the PAC as an affiliate member for men's volleyball and men's wrestling in the 2024–25 academic year.
  - The PAC added men's volleyball starting in the 2025 spring season of the 2024–25 academic year. At the time of announcement, the men's volleyball league was planned to start with six full members. Geneva, Saint Vincent and Thiel were associate members of the Allegheny Mountain Collegiate Conference (AMCC); Bethany and Chatham were committed to adding men's volleyball in 2023–24; and Grove City was to add men's volleyball in 2024–25.
- 2025:
  - Hiram upgraded as a full member of the PAC, beginning the 2025–26 academic year (for full conference competition). It initially joined the PAC for administrative purposes for the 2024–25 school year.
  - Carnegie Mellon left the PAC as an affiliate member for football to join the Centennial Conference on that sport after the 2024 fall season (2024–25 academic year).
- 2026 – Saint Francis University joined the PAC, beginning the 2026–27 academic year (for full conference competition). It initially joined the PAC for administrative purposes for the 2025–26 school year.

== Member schools ==
=== Current full members ===
The Presidents' has 13 full members, all private schools.

Institution	Location	Founded	Affiliation	Enrollment	Nickname	Joined (Note: Represents the calendar year when fall sports competition begins.)	Colors	Football?
Allegheny College	Meadville, Pennsylvania	1815	Methodist	1,442	Gators	2022 (Note: Allegheny was previously a full member of the PAC from 1958–59 to 1983–84.)		Yes
Bethany College	Bethany, West Virginia	1840	Disciples of Christ	650	Bison	1958		Yes
Chatham University (Note: This institution is a former women's college, which has eventually turned into a co-educational college (Chatham since 2015–16).)	Pittsburgh, Pennsylvania	1869	Nonsectarian	2,300	Cougars	2007		No
Franciscan University of Steubenville	Steubenville, Ohio	1946	Catholic (Franciscan Friars)	2,716	Barons	2020 (Note: Franciscan previously competed as an associate member of the PAC in seven sports before becoming a full member, beginning the 2020–21 school year, which consisted of the following: men's and women's lacrosse joined during 2018–19; while women's golf, plus men's and women's indoor and outdoor track & field, joined during 2019–20.)		No
Geneva College	Beaver Falls, Pennsylvania	1848	Reformed	1,791	Golden Tornadoes	2007		Yes
Grove City College	Grove City, Pennsylvania	1876	Nondenominational (Note: Formerly affiliated with the Presbyterian Church (USA).)	2,500	Wolverines	1984		Yes
Hiram College	Hiram, Ohio	1850	Disciples of Christ	1,271	Terriers	1971; 2025 (Note: Hiram was previously a full member of the PAC from 1971–72 to 1988–89.) (Note: Hiram joined for administrative purposes, as well as men's volleyball, in 2024–25, but did not start conference competition in other sports until 2025–26.)		Yes
Saint Francis University	Loretto, Pennsylvania	1847	Catholic (Franciscan)	2,111	Red Wolves	2026 (Note: Saint Francis joined for administrative purposes in 2025–26, but did not start conference competition until 2026–27.)		Yes
Saint Vincent College	Latrobe, Pennsylvania	1846	Catholic (Benedictines)	1,652	Bearcats	2006		Yes
Thiel College	Greenville, Pennsylvania	1866	Lutheran ELCA	790	Tomcats	1958		Yes
Washington & Jefferson College	Washington, Pennsylvania	1781	Nonsectarian	1,519	Presidents	1958		Yes
Waynesburg University	Waynesburg, Pennsylvania	1849	Presbyterian	1,500	Yellow Jackets	1990		Yes
Westminster College	New Wilmington, Pennsylvania	1852	Presbyterian	1,482	Titans	2000		Yes

=== Associate members ===
The Presidents' has one associate member, which joined for football only starting in the 2014 fall season (2014–15 school year) and has remained in PAC football to this day.

Institution	Location	Founded	Affiliation	Enrollment	Nickname	Joined (Note: Represents the calendar year when fall sports competition begins.)	PAC sport(s)	Primary conference
Case Western Reserve University (Note: Case Western Reserve was previously a full member of the PAC from 1970–71 to 1983–84.)	Cleveland, Ohio	1826	Nonsectarian	6,186	Spartans	2014	Football	University (UAA)

=== Former full members ===
The Presidents' has 9 former full members, with all but two being private schools.

Institution	Location	Founded	Affiliation	Enrollment	Nickname	Joined (Note: Represents the calendar year when fall sports competition begins.)	Left (Note: Represents the calendar year when spring sports competition ends.)	Current conference
Alfred University	Alfred, New York	1836	Nonsectarian	2,300	Saxons	1996	1998	Empire 8
Carnegie Mellon University (Note: Carnegie Mellon returned to the PAC as an associate member for football from the 2014 fall season to the 2024 fall season (2014–15 to 2024–25 school years).)	Pittsburgh, Pennsylvania	1900	Nonsectarian	16,676 (2024)	Tartans	1968	1990	University (UAA)
Case Institute of Technology	Cleveland, Ohio	1880	Nonsectarian	N/A	Rough Riders	1955	1970	N/A (Note: Case Tech merged with Western Reserve University in 1967.) (Note: Case Tech and Western Reserve University merged in 1967, but the athletic programs continued to operate separately through the 1969–70 school year.)
Case Western Reserve University (Note: Case Western Reserve rejoined the PAC as an associate member for football starting with the 2014 fall season (2014–15 school year).)	Cleveland, Ohio	1967	Nonsectarian	12,475 (2024)	Spartans	1970	1984	University (UAA)
Eastern Michigan University	Ypsilanti, Michigan	1849	Public	12,663 (2024)	Eagles	1962	1967	Mid-American (MAC) (Note: Currently an NCAA Division I athletic conference.)
John Carroll University	University Heights, Ohio	1886	Catholic (Jesuit)	3,726	Blue Streaks	1955	1989	North Coast (NCAC)
Thomas More University (Note: Thomas More was known as Thomas More College throughout its PAC tenure. It adopted its current name in October 2018, shortly after leaving the PAC.)	Crestview Hills, Kentucky	1921	Catholic (Benedictine Sisters)	1,900	Saints	2005	2018	Great Midwest (G-MAC) (Note: Currently an NCAA Division II athletic conference.)
Wayne State University	Detroit, Michigan	1868	Public	23,964 (2024)	Tartars (Note: Wayne State joined the PAC as Wayne University. It adopted its current name in 1956 and its current nickname of Warriors in 1999.)	1955	1967	Great Lakes (GLIAC)
Western Reserve University (Note: During the first three years after the Case Western Reserve merger (1967–1970), when Case Tech and Western Reserve continued to operate separate athletic programs, Western Reserve used the athletic identity of its former undergraduate arm, Adelbert College.)	Cleveland, Ohio	1826	Nonsectarian	N/A	Red Cats	1955	1970	N/A (Note: Western Reserve merged with Case Institute of Technology in 1967.)

=== Former associate members ===
The Presidents' has two former associate members; both are private schools, and one is now a full PAC member.

Institution	Location	Founded	Affiliation	Enrollment	Nickname	Joined (Note: Represents the calendar year when fall sports competition begins.)	Left (Note: Represents the calendar year when spring sports competition ends.)	PAC sport(s)	Primary conference
Carnegie Mellon University (Note: Carnegie Mellon was previously a full member of the PAC from 1968–69 to 1989–90.)	Pittsburgh, Pennsylvania	1900	Nonsectarian	6,362	Tartans	2014	2025	Football	University (UAA)
Hiram College (Note: Hiram returned to the PAC as an associate member for men's volleyball starting with the 2025 spring season (2024–25 school year), and returned to PAC competition in all sports in 2025–26.)	Hiram, Ohio	1850	Disciples of Christ	1,271	Terriers	2024	2025	Men's volleyball	Presidents' (PAC)

=== Membership timeline ===
Full member (all sports) Full member (non-football) Associate member (football) Associate member (sport)

== Sports ==
A divisional format is used for basketball (M / W) and volleyball (W).
North
- Allegheny
- Geneva
- Grove City
- Hiram
- Thiel
- Westminster (Pa.)
South
- Bethany
- Chatham
- Franciscan
- Saint Vincent
- Saint Francis (Pa.)
- Washington & Jefferson
- Waynesburg

Conference sports
Sport	Men's	Women's
Baseball	✓	
Basketball	✓	✓
Cross country	✓	✓
Football	✓	
Golf	✓	✓
Lacrosse	✓	✓
Soccer	✓	✓
Softball		✓
Swimming & diving	✓	✓
Tennis	✓	✓
Track & field (indoor)	✓	✓
Track & field (outdoor)	✓	✓
Volleyball	✓	✓
Wrestling	✓	

== Diversity, equity, and inclusion (DEI) initiatives ==
In 2021, the NCAA announced that Kate Costanzo of Allegheny College – a former NCAC staff member affiliated with the PAC – was a finalist for the NCAA Division III LGBTQ Administrator/Coach/Staff of the Year Award.
