= Thiel College =

Lutheran college in Greenville, Pennsylvania, US

Coordinates: 41.413°N 80.383°W

- Former name: Thiel Hall (1866–1870)
- Motto: Lux Mundi, Verbum Dei
- Motto in English: Light of the World, Word of God
- Type: Private college
- Established: 1866; 160 years ago
- Religious affiliation: Evangelical Lutheran Church in America
- President: Susan Traverso
- Undergraduates: 790 (fall 2022)
- Location: Greenville, Pennsylvania, U.S.
- Colors: Blue and gold
- Nickname: Tomcats
- Sporting affiliations: NCAA Division III – Presidents' Athletic Conference
- Mascot: Tommy Tomcat
- Website: thiel.edu
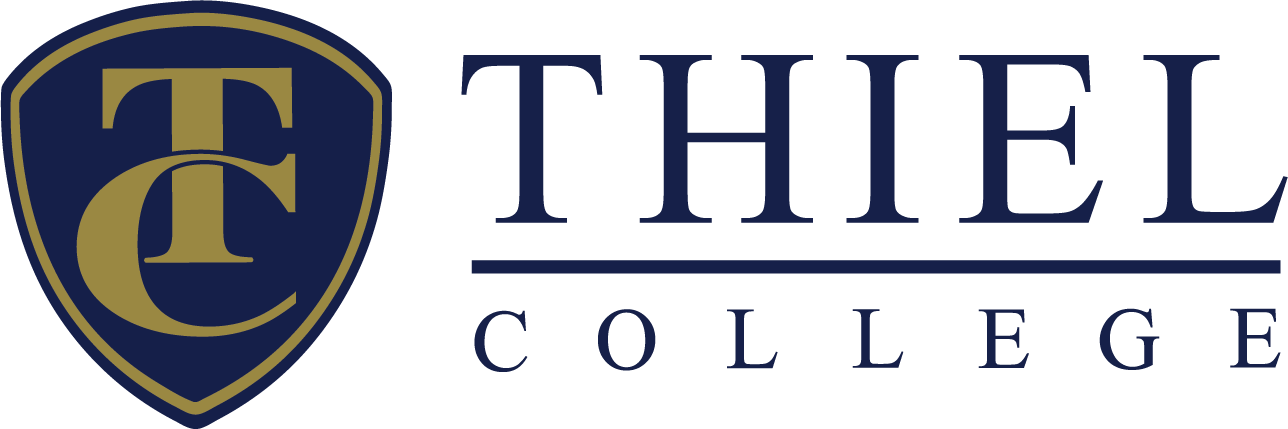

Thiel College (/tiːl/, /tiːəl/) is a private college in Greenville, Pennsylvania, United States. It is affiliated with the Evangelical Lutheran Church in America and is one of the smaller colleges in the region with about 100 full-time and part-time faculty members.

== History ==
Founded in 1866 as a coeducational institution known as "Thiel Hall", the college started as a result of a meeting between William Passavant and A. Louis Thiel. At the Lutheran Church Pittsburgh Synod convention in Greensburg in 1869, it was decided that Thiel Hall would become a college and serve western Pennsylvania from an initial campus in Philipsburg (now known as Monaca). Four years later, on September 1, 1870, the college received a charter from the government of Pennsylvania and relocated to Greenville, where it was incorporated as Thiel College.

On August 1, 2016, Susan Traverso became the 20th and the first female president of Thiel College.

Today, Thiel is home to about 110 full- and part-time faculty members. According to the US Department of Education, the school has just under 1,000 students in attendance.

Thiel College awarded Amelia Earhart an honorary degree in 1932. In his book The Search for Amelia Earhart, author Fred Goerner said, "The most satisfying recognition, however, came from her father's alma mater, Thiel College of Greenville, Pennsylvania in the form of an honorary Doctor of Science degree."

Thiel was also the first institution to grant an honorary degree to Fred Rogers in 1969. Rogers' address at Thiel was titled "Encouraging Creativity". In his address, he admonished educators and society in general for forcing conformity on children and encouraged understanding and tolerance as children endeavored to find their gifts. Thiel College also presented an honorary degree to Richard M. Nixon in 1959 when he was U.S. vice-president.

== Campus ==
Thiel is situated on a wooded 200-acre campus in the small western Pennsylvania town of Greenville, which is about halfway between Cleveland and Pittsburgh.

Thiel has an enrollment of around 920 students, with over 100 of those students in graduate programs. The student body is 48% male and 52% female. 63% percent of students are from Pennsylvania, 33% are from other states and Puerto Rico, and the remaining 4% are international students. 19% of students are minorities. The college has a student:faculty ratio of about 12:1, and 61% of classes have 20 or fewer students.

The school opened renovated spaces in Rhodehouse Memorial Science Building in 2022. The Haer Family Science and Arts Connector and a competition-certified Barry and Carol Stamm Track and Field complex opened in the fall of 2017. The Maenpa Court in the Rissell-Beeghley Gymnasium was remodeled in the fall of 2022 and the Paul Bush '66 Memorial Fitness Center opened in 2016.

== Academics ==
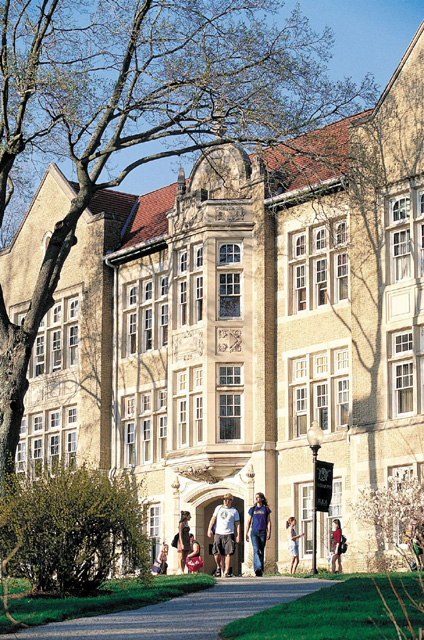
Roth Hall

Thiel offers Bachelor of Arts and Bachelor of Science degrees in more than 60 majors, minors, and areas of study. It also offers master's degree programs in business administration, physician assistant studies and speech-language pathology. Thiel is accredited by the Middle States Commission on Higher Education with some programs accredited by specialized accreditors.

=== Health sciences ===
Thiel College offers several health sciences programs at both the undergraduate and graduate levels. The Bachelor of Science in Nursing (BSN) is accredited by the Commission on Collegiate Nursing Education (CCNE) and approved by the Pennsylvania State Board of Nursing. The Physician Assistant Studies program, a graduate-level master's degree, is housed in the renovated Rhodehouse Memorial Science Building alongside laboratory and clinical teaching facilities including a cadaver lab. The Speech-Language Pathology program offers a Master of Science degree accredited by the Council on Academic Accreditation in Audiology and Speech-Language Pathology (CAA) of the American Speech-Language-Hearing Association (ASHA). In 2026, Thiel launches a new Bachelor of Science in Nutrition, expanding its allied health and wellness offerings.

=== Business ===
The college's business separtment is the largest on campus. It offers undergraduate programs as well as the Master of Business Administration (MBA). The department's programs were shaped in significant part by alumnus David M. Miller who served on the Thiel faculty for 56 years, one of the longest tenures of any faculty member in the college's history. In recognition of his contributions, the college established the David M. Miller Endowed Chair of Accounting

The Haller Enterprise Institute, named after benefactors Henry E. and Grace Mary Haller, was founded in 1995 and offers a Certificate in Entrepreneurship, access to an advisory board of regional business leaders, and annual Entrepreneur of the Year and Student Entrepreneur of the Year awards. The Institute also awards academic scholarships to prospective and current students who demonstrate active involvement in entrepreneurial activity.

=== Environmental safety management ===
Established in 2019, Thiel College's Bachelor of Science in Environmental Safety Management prepares students for careers across a wide range of sectors including manufacturing, construction, healthcare, government, and environmental consulting. The program holds Qualified Academic Program (QAP) designation from the Board of Certified Safety Professionals (BCSP).

=== Dietrich Honors Institute ===
Thiel College is home to the Kenneth and Mariana Brown Dietrich Honors Institute, one of a small number of programs supported by the Dietrich Foundation. The institute provides academically motivated students with an enriched educational experience combining interdisciplinary coursework and research with opportunities for community engagement, travel, and leadership development.

=== Education ===
Thiel's Education programs are approved by the Pennsylvania Department of Education to prepare elementary and secondary teachers. The college offers a Bachelor of Arts in Early Childhood Education/Special Education (PreK-4/PreK-12), as well as secondary education certification programs in which students pair a content-area major, such as English, History, Math, or Biology, with a Pennsylvania teaching certificate.

=== Pre-professional programs ===
Thiel College offers pre-professional pathways in medicine, occupational therapy, pharmacy, physical therapy, podiatry, and law. These programs are supported by a network of articulation and early assurance agreements with partner institutions, providing qualified students with guaranteed or preferential admission to graduate and professional programs. These include early acceptance programs in osteopathic medicine, dentistry, pharmacy, and podiatry with Lake Erie College of Osteopathic Medicine, a physical therapy pathway with Gannon University leading to a Doctor of Physical Therapy, and accelerated J.D. programs with Capital University and Duquesne University School of Law. Additionally, students may pursue graduate programs in international affairs, international development, and public administration with the University of Pittsburgh's Graduate School of Public and International Affairs.

== Student life ==
Thiel offers a variety of activities, clubs and organizations; college sources claim 28 honorary societies and academic clubs, fraternities and sororities, service organizations, student government, a theatre troupe, multicultural and religious groups, marching and concert bands, and several choirs. TCTV is the Thiel College television station.

Nearly 88% of students live on campus. Other facilities on campus include a computer lab, career development center, IT Solution Center, Learning Commons, art gallery, a fitness center, sensory rooms, and a theater.

== Athletics ==
The Thiel College teams, named the Tomcats, compete in NCAA Division-III athletics, in the Presidents' Athletic Conference.

The college currently fields teams in baseball, men's and women's basketball, cheerleading, dance, men's and women's cross country, football, men's and women's golf, men's and women's lacrosse, men's and women's soccer, softball, men's and women's tennis, men's and women's indoor track & field, men's and women's outdoor track & field, men's and women's volleyball, and wrestling.

Thiel also offers intramural sports, as well as an equestrian club.

=== Championships ===
The Thiel College cheer team has finished in the top three in the nation. It won the National Championship in the Cheer Spirit Rally Open division at the National Cheerleaders Association College Nationals in spring of 2023 and finished third in 2024 and 2025. The team finished second in 2022 in this category.

The men’s volleyball team made its first NCAA Tournament appearance and was the PAC champion in spring of 2025.

The Thiel College wrestling team won its 23rd President’s Athletic Conference championship on February 12, 2022. The Tomcats earned the second seed in the tournament after finishing the regular season with a 28–12 overall record and a 17–7 record in the PAC in 2016.

== Notable alumni ==
- James Davy (born 1953), former New Jersey Commissioner of Human Services under Governors James McGreevey and Jon Corzine
- Mark Funkhouser, former mayor of Kansas City, Missouri
- Shirley M. Frye, mathematics educator
- Lynn Jones, baseball player
- Mark Nordenberg, former chancellor of the University of Pittsburgh
- Tom Regan, professor and writer
- Jack M. Wilson, former president of the University of Massachusetts
- Phyllis Zimmerman, composer and choral conductor
