= Indianapolis Colts draft history =

This is a list of NFL draft selections by the Indianapolis Colts. The first draft that the current incarnation of the Colts franchise participated in was 1953, in which they made halfback Billy Vessels of Oklahoma their first ever selection.

== Key ==
= All-Pro or Pro Bowler
= MVP
= Hall of Famer

== 1953 draft ==
Round	Pick #	Overall	Name	Position	College
1	2	2	Billy Vessels	Halfback	Oklahoma
2	1	14	Bernie Flowers	End	Purdue
3	1	26	Buck McPhail	Fullback	Oklahoma
4	1	38	Tom Catlin	Center	Oklahoma
5	1	50	Jack Little	Offensive tackle	Texas A&M
6	1	62	Jim Sears	Quarterback	USC
7	1	74	Bill Athey	Guard	Baylor
8	1	86	Jim Prewett	Tackle	Tulsa
9	1	98	Bob Blair	Tight end	TCU
10	1	110	John Cole	Halfback	Arkansas
11	1	122	Gene Rossi	Halfback	Cincinnati
12	1	134	Kaye Vaughn	Guard	Tulsa
13	1	146	Bobby Moorhead	Halfback	Georgia Tech
14	1	158	Frank Continetti	Guard	George Washington
15	1	170	Buddy Sutton	Halfback	Arkansas
16	1	182	Jim Currin	End	Dayton
17	1	194	George Rambour	Tackle	Dartmouth
18	1	206	LeRoy Labat	Halfback	LSU
19	1	218	Bill Powell	Halfback	California
20	1	230	Pete Russo	Tackle	Indiana
21	1	242	Frank Kirby	Tackle	Bucknell
22	1	254	Merlin Gish	Center	Kansas
23	1	266	Mike Houseplan	Guard	Tulane
24	1	278	Monte Brethauer	Defensive back	Oregon
25	1	290	Joe Szombathy	End	Syracuse
26	1	302	Scott Prescott	Center	Minnesota
27	1	314	Ray Graves	Halfback	Texas A&M
28	1	326	Joe Sabol	Halfback	UCLA
29	1	338	Jack Alessandrini	Guard	Notre Dame
30	1	350	Tom Roche	Tackle	Northwestern

== 1954 draft ==
Round	Pick #	Overall	Name	Position	College
1	5	5	Cotton Davidson	Quarterback	Baylor
2	3	16	Larry Grigg	Back	Oklahoma
5	4	53	Don Ellis	Back	Texas A&M
7	4	77	Glenn Turner	Back	Georgia Tech
8	3	88	Dennis McCotter	Guard	Detroit
9	4	101	Robert Adams	Guard	Shippensburg
10	3	112	Robert Schoonmaker	Back	Missouri
11	4	125	Robert Leberman	Defensive back	Syracuse
12	3	136	Donald Chelf	Tackle	Iowa
13	4	149	Chuck McMillan	Defensive back	John Carroll
14	3	160	Ordell Braase	Defensive end	South Dakota
15	4	173	Joe D'Agostino	Guard	Florida
16	3	184	Alex Sandusky	Center	Clarion
17	4	197	Thomas Adkins	Center	Kentucky
18	3	208	Dick Shinaut	Quarterback	Texas Western
19	4	221	Charley Wenzlau	Center	Miami (OH)
20	3	232	Raymond Berry	Wide receiver	SMU
21	4	245	Robert Lade	Guard	Nebraska State Teacher's College
22	3	256	Bob Meyer	Tackle	Ohio State
23	4	269	Leon Hardeman	Back	Georgia Tech
24	3	280	Donald Kerlin	Back	Concordia
25	4	293	Pepper Rodgers	Back	Georgia Tech
26	3	304	Jesus Esparza	Tackle	New Mexico A&M
27	4	317	William Sennett	Center	Georgia Tech
28	3	328	Raymond Ecstrom	Center	Westminster
29	4	341	Claude Taliaferro	Back	Illinois
30	3	352	Pat Abbruzzi	Back	Rhode Island

== 1955 draft ==
Round	Pick #	Overall	Name	Position	College
1	1	1	George Shaw	Quarterback	Oregon
1	3	3	Alan Ameche	Fullback	Wisconsin
2	3	16	Dick Szymanski	Center	Notre Dame
3	2	27	L.G. Dupre	Halfback	Baylor
4	7	44	Jack Patera	Linebacker	Oregon
5	2	51	George Preas	Guard	Virginia Tech
6	3	64	Leo Lewis	Halfback	Lincoln (MO)
7	2	75	Frank McDonald	Center	Miami (FL)
8	3	88	Dale Meinert	Linebacker	Oklahoma A&M
9	2	99	Walter Bryan	Defensive back	Texas Tech
9	7	104	William Evans	Guard	Miami (OH)
11	2	123	Emil Radik	Halfback	Omaha
12	3	136	Dick Chorovich	Defensive tackle	Miami (OH)
13	2	147	Pat Abbruzzi	Halfback	Rhode Island
14	3	160	John Lee	Back	Georgia Tech
15	2	171	Jerry Peterson	Defensive tackle	Texas
16	3	184	Dick Laswell	Tackle	TCU
17	2	195	Wesley Clark	Tackle	Mississippi Southern
18	3	208	Charley Shepherd	Halfback	North Texas State
19	2	219	James Cobb	Tackle	Abilene Christian
20	3	232	Charles Cianciola	Center	Lawrence College
21	2	243	Nick Manych	Center	Michigan State Normal
22	3	256	Jerry Welch	Halfback	South Dakota State
23	2	267	Dick McNamara	Halfback	Minnesota
24	3	280	Alex Esquivel	Halfback	Mexico City College
25	2	291	Richard Grann	Tackle	Rhode Island
26	3	304	Marion Minker	Tackle	Bucknell
27	2	315	James Locke	Tackle	Virginia Tech
28	3	328	Robert Myers	Tackle	Ohio State
29	2	339	Bill Waters	Tackle	Austin

== 1956 draft ==
Round	Pick #	Overall	Name	Position	College
1	9	9	Lenny Moore	Halfback	Penn State
2	8	21	Dick Donlin	End	Hamline
3	8	33	Bob Pascal	Halfback	Duke
4	6	43	B.C. Inabinet	Tackle	Clemson
5	6	55	Herb Gray	End	Texas
6	6	67	Don Schmidt	Halfback	Texas Tech
7	6	79	Bill Waters	Tackle	Austin
8	6	91	Bill Koman	Linebacker	North Carolina
9	6	103	John Lewis	End	Michigan State
10	6	115	Gene Scott	Halfback	Centre College
11	6	127	Dennis Shaw	End	North Texas State
12	6	139	Steve Myhra	Guard	North Dakota
13	6	151	Jack Hill	Halfback	Utah State
14	6	163	Ted Schwanger	Halfback	Tennessee Poly
15	6	175	John Polzer	Linebacker	Virginia
16	6	187	Gene Hendrix	Halfback	Drake
17	6	199	Bill Danenhauer	Defensive end	Emporia State
18	6	211	Earl Looman	Guard	Stetson
19	6	223	Bob Fyvie	Tackle	Lafayette
20	6	235	Bob Hill	Fullback	Jackson State
21	6	247	Jim Harness	Defensive back	Mississippi State
22	6	259	Pat Del Vicaro	Guard	Mississippi Southern
23	6	271	Al Stephenson	Tackle	Idaho State
24	6	283	Bobby Fox	Halfback	East Texas State
25	6	295	Bradley Mills	Halfback	Kentucky
26	6	307	Jim Lohr	Guard	Southeast Missouri State
27	6	319	Herb Hartwell	Halfback	Virginia
28	6	331	John Shearer	Quarterback	Shepherd
29	6	343	Jim Rusher	End	Kansas State
30	5	354	Terry Sweeney	Halfback	Middle Tennessee State

== 1957 draft ==
Round	Pick #	Overall	Name	Position	College
1	8	8	Jim Parker	Guard	Ohio State
2	7	20	Don Shinnick	Linebacker	UCLA
3	7	32	Luke Owens	Defensive end	Kent State
4	7	44	Jackie Simpson	Halfback	Florida
5	5	54	Ron Underwood	Halfback	Arkansas
6	4	65	Billy Pricer	Fullback	Oklahoma
7	6	79	Reuben Saage	Halfback	Baylor
8	5	90	Jack Harmon	Halfback	Eastern Oregon State
9	4	101	Robert White	Tackle	Otterbein
10	6	115	Joe Grisham	End	Austin Peay
11	5	126	Andy Nelson	Defensive back	Memphis State
12	4	137	Don Simonic	Tackle	Tennessee Poly
13	6	151	Jack Call	Halfback	Colgate
14	5	162	Joe Guido	Halfback	Youngstown
15	4	173	Hall Whitley	Linebacker	Texas A&I
16	4	185	Joe Cannavino	Defensive back	Ohio State
16	6	187	Ed Prelock	Tackle	Kansas
17	5	198	Dan Wisniewski	Guard	Pittsburgh
18	4	209	Jim Villa	Halfback	Allegheny
19	6	223	Charles Froehle	Tackle	St. John's (MN)
20	5	234	Walt Livingston	Halfback	Heidelberg
21	4	245	Owen Mulholland	Halfback	Houston
22	6	259	Chet Van Atta	Linebacker	Kansas
23	5	270	Connie Baird	End	Hardin–Simmons
24	4	281	Harwood Hoeft	End	South Dakota State
25	6	295	Harlon Geach	Tackle	College of Idaho
26	5	306	Joe Unitas	Tackle	Louisville
27	4	317	Len DeMalon	Linebacker	Saint Vincent
28	6	331	Walt Schneiter	Tackle	Colorado
29	5	342	Bob Rasmussen	Guard	Minnesota
30	3	352	Bob Bailey	End	Thiel

== 1958 draft ==
Round	Pick #	Overall	Name	Position	College
1	11	11	Lenny Lyles	Defensive back	Louisville
2	11	24	Bob Stransky	Halfback	Colorado
3	10	35	Joe Nicely	Guard	West Virginia
4	11	48	Les Walters	End	Penn State
5	1	50	Ray Brown	Defensive back	Ole Miss
6	8	69	Bob Taylor	End	Vanderbilt
7	6	79	Johnny Sample	Defensive back	Maryland State
7	9	82	John Diehl	Tackle	Virginia
8	8	93	Floyd Peters	Defensive tackle	San Francisco State
9	9	106	Harold Bullard	Fullback	Lenoir-Rhyne
10	8	117	Ray Schamber	Halfback	South Dakota
11	9	130	Bobby Jordan	Halfback	VMI
12	8	141	Tommy Addison	Linebacker	South Carolina
13	9	154	Jerry Richardson	Flanker	Wofford
14	8	165	Ken Hall	Halfback	Texas A&M
15	9	178	Lester Carney	Halfback	Ohio
16	8	189	Archie Matsos	Linebacker	Michigan State
17	9	202	James Reese	Quarterback	Minnesota
18	8	213	Dave Lloyd	Linebacker	Georgia
19	9	226	Tim Murnen	Guard	Bowling Green
20	8	237	Tom Forrestal	Quarterback	Navy
21	9	250	Jim Faulk	Halfback	TCU
22	8	261	Bob McKee	End	Monmouth
23	9	274	Phil Parslow	Halfback	UCLA
24	8	285	Bobby Sandlin	Halfback	Tennessee
25	9	298	Jim Roundtree	Halfback	Florida
26	8	309	Bob Grimes	Guard	Central Michigan
27	9	322	George Dintiman	Halfback	Lock Haven
28	8	333	Jim Murphy	Tackle	East Tennessee State
29	9	346	Doug Padgett	End	Duke
30	7	356	Gary Lund	Guard	Utah State

== 1959 draft ==
Round	Pick #	Overall	Name	Position	College
1	12	12	Jackie Burkett	Center	Auburn
2	12	24	Dave Sherer	End	SMU
4	12	48	Zeke Smith	Linebacker	Auburn
5	12	60	Don Churchwell	Offensive tackle	Ole Miss
6	12	72	Palmer Pyle	Tackle	Michigan State
7	12	84	Harold Lewis	Halfback	Houston
8	12	96	Tommy Joe Coffey	Halfback	West Texas State
9	12	108	Tom Brown	Guard	Minnesota
10	12	120	Don Stewart	End	SMU
11	12	132	Tom Stephens	Halfback	Syracuse
12	12	144	Dick Wood	Quarterback	Auburn
13	12	156	Rudy Smith	Guard	Mississippi
14	12	168	Ferdie Burket	Halfback	Southeastern Oklahoma State
15	12	180	Ted Foret	Tackle	Auburn
16	12	192	Morris Keller	Tackle	Clemson
17	12	204	Leroy Bergan	Tackle	South Dakota State
18	12	216	Opie Bandy	Linebacker	Tulsa
19	12	228	Milton Crain	Linebacker	Mississippi
20	12	240	Paul Balonick	Linebacker	North Carolina State
21	12	252	John Hernstein	Fullback	Michigan
22	12	264	Lonny Leatherman	Tackle	TCU
23	12	276	Bob Davis	Halfback	Houston
24	12	288	Bob Novogratz	Linebacker	Army
25	12	300	Ed Kieffer	Halfback	Syracuse
26	12	312	Rene Lorio	Halfback	Mississippi Southern
27	12	324	Thurman Terry	Tackle	Rice
28	12	336	Fred Long	Fullback	Iowa
29	12	348	Perry McGriff	End	Florida
30	12	360	Blair Weese	Fullback	West Virginia Tech

== 1960 draft ==
Round	Pick #	Overall	Name	Position	College
1	10	10	Ron Mix	Offensive tackle	USC
2	11	23	Don Floyd	Defensive tackle	TCU
2	12	24	Marvin Terrell	Guard	Ole Miss
3	10	34	Jim Welch	Defensive back	SMU
4	11	47	Gerhard Schwedes	Halfback	Syracuse
5	10	58	Marvin Lasater	Halfback	TCU
6	11	71	Al Bansavage	Linebacker	USC
7	10	82	Jerry Beabout	Tackle	Purdue
8	11	95	Jim Colvin	Defensive tackle	Houston
9	7	103	Bob Hall	Tackle	Kent State
9	10	106	Don Perkins	Running back	New Mexico
10	4	112	Ernie Barnes	Guard	North Carolina College
10	11	119	Bobby Boyd	Defensive back	Oklahoma
11	10	130	Bob Wehking	Center	Florida
12	11	143	Bill Bucek	Halfback	Rice
13	10	154	Jim Nemeth	Center	South Carolina
14	11	167	Dale Johannsen	Tackle	Augustana (SD)
15	10	178	Larry Grantham	Linebacker	Ole Miss
16	11	191	George Boynton	Halfback	East Texas State
17	10	202	Jim Beaver	Tackle	Florida
18	11	215	Dan Sheehan	Tackle	Chattanooga
19	10	226	Bill Carpenter	End	Army
20	11	239	Bob Houge	Tackle	Shepherd

== 1961 draft ==
Round	Pick #	Overall	Name	Position	College
1	7	7	Tom Matte	Running back	Ohio State
2	7	21	Tom Gilburg	Offensive tackle	Syracuse
3	7	35	Jerry Hill	Running back	Wyoming
4	7	49	Ken Gregory	Tight end	Whittier
5	6	62	Ed Dyas	Fullback	Auburn
5	7	63	Ron Osborne	Tackle	Clemson
6	7	77	Don Kern	Halfback	VMI
7	7	91	Ike Grimsley	Halfback	Michigan State
8	7	105	Paul Terhes	Quarterback	Bucknell
9	7	119	Pete Nicklas	Tackle	Baylor
10	7	133	Bob Clemens	Halfback	Pittsburgh
11	7	147	Ralph White	Tackle	Bowling Green
12	7	161	Dick Reynolds	Tackle	North Carolina State
13	7	175	Dallas Garber	Fullback	Marietta
14	7	189	Bob Hunt	Tackle	SMU
15	7	203	E.A. Sims	End	New Mexico State
16	7	217	Tom Weisner	Fullback	Wisconsin
17	7	231	Steve Jastrzembski	End	Pittsburgh
18	7	245	Wilson Allison	Tackle	Baylor
19	7	259	Joe Novsek	Tackle	Tulsa
20	7	273	Al Kimbrough	Halfback	Northwestern

== 1962 draft ==
Round	Pick #	Overall	Name	Position	College
1	9	9	Wendell Harris	Defensive back	LSU
2	9	23	Bill Saul	Linebacker	Penn State
3	9	37	Dan Sullivan	Guard	Boston College
4	9	51	Jim Dillard	Halfback	Oklahoma State
5	5	61	Jerry Croft	Guard	Bowling Green
7	9	93	Fred Miller	Defensive tackle	LSU
8	9	107	Pete Brokaw	Halfback	Syracuse
9	4	116	Roy Walker	Fullback	Purdue
9	9	121	Walt Rappold	Quarterback	Duke
10	9	135	Fred Moore	Tackle	Memphis State
11	9	149	Scott Tyler	Halfback	Miami (OH)
12	9	163	Bake Turner	Wide receiver	Texas Tech
13	9	177	Charles Holmes	Fullback	Maryland State
14	9	191	Stinson Jones	Halfback	VMI
15	9	205	Joe Monte	Guard	Furman
16	9	219	Ray Abruzzese	Defensive back	Alabama
17	9	233	Bill Knocke	Halfback	Fresno State
18	9	247	Mel Rideout	Quarterback	Richmond
19	9	261	Fred Gillett	Halfback	Los Angeles State
20	9	275	Herm McKee	Halfback	Washington State

== 1963 draft ==
Round	Pick #	Overall	Name	Position	College
1	5	5	Bob Vogel	Offensive tackle	Ohio State
2	5	19	John Mackey	Tight end	Syracuse
2	10	24	Butch Wilson	Fullback	Alabama
4	5	47	Jerry Logan	Defensive back	West Texas State
4	11	53	Harlow Fullwood	Offensive tackle	Virginia Union
5	5	61	Bill Ventura	End	Richmond
6	5	75	Jerry Cook	Halfback	Texas
7	5	89	Willie Richardson	End	Jackson State
8	5	103	Dave Hayes	Fullback	Penn State
9	5	117	Don Trull	Quarterback	Baylor
10	5	131	Bill Siekierski	Guard	Missouri
11	5	145	Winston Hill	Offensive tackle	Texas Southern
12	5	159	Butch Maples	Center	Baylor
13	5	173	Paul Watters	Offensive tackle	Miami (OH)
14	5	187	Neil Petties	End	San Diego State
15	5	201	Leon Mavity	Halfback	Colorado
16	5	215	Dick Quast	End	Memphis State
17	5	229	Kern Carson	Halfback	San Diego State
18	5	243	Luther Woodruff	Offensive tackle	North Carolina A&T
19	5	257	Steve Berzansky	Fullback	West Virginia
20	5	271	D.L. Hurd	End	San Francisco State

== 1964 draft ==
Round	Pick #	Overall	Name	Position	College
1	8	8	Marv Woodson	Safety	Indiana
2	8	22	Tony Lorick	Halfback	Arizona State
4	8	50	Ted Davis	Linebacker	Georgia Tech
5	8	64	Ed Lothamer	Tackle	Michigan State
6	8	78	Jim Mazurek	Tackle	Syracuse
7	8	92	Ken Sugarman	Tackle	Whitworth
8	8	106	John Williamson	Linebacker	Louisiana Tech
9	8	120	Vince Turner	Halfback	Missouri
11	8	148	John Paglio	Tackle	Syracuse
12	8	162	Ken Graham	Halfback	Washington State
13	8	176	Charlie Parker	Tackle	Southern Miss
14	8	190	John Case	End	Clemson
15	8	204	Larry Kramer	Tackle	Nebraska
16	8	218	Roger Lopes	Fullback	Michigan State
17	8	232	Don Green	Halfback	Susquehanna
18	8	246	Alvin Haymond	Halfback	Southern
19	8	260	Owen Dejanovich	Tackle	Arizona State College at Flagstaff
20	8	274	John Butler	Fullback	San Diego State

== 1965 draft ==
Round	Pick #	Overall	Name	Position	College
1	14	14	Mike Curtis	Linebacker	Duke
2	14	28	Ralph Neely	Offensive tackle	Oklahoma
3	8	36	Glenn Ressler	Guard	Penn State
4	7	49	Marty Schottenheimer	Linebacker	Pittsburgh
4	14	56	Dave Johnson	Halfback	San Jose State
5	14	70	John McGuire	End	Syracuse
6	1	71	Bob Felts	Halfback	Florida A&M
6	14	84	Al Atkinson	Linebacker	Villanova
7	14	98	John Kolocek	Offensive tackle	Corpus Christi State
8	14	112	Roosevelt Davis	Offensive tackle	Tennessee A&I
9	14	126	Tom Bleick	Halfback	Georgia Tech
10	14	140	George Harold	Halfback	Allen
11	14	154	Lamar Richardson	End	Fisk
12	14	168	Ted Radosovich	Guard	Cincinnati
13	14	182	Bruce Airheart	Halfback	North Dakota State
14	14	196	Jerry Fishman	Linebacker	Maryland
15	14	210	Roy Hilton	Defensive end	Jackson State
16	14	224	Steve Tensi	Quarterback	Florida State
17	14	238	Fred Reichardt	End	Wisconsin
18	14	252	Charley King	Halfback	Purdue
19	14	266	Barry Brown	Linebacker	Florida
20	7	273	Raymond Johnson	Center	Prairie View A&M
20	14	280	George Haffner	Quarterback	McNeese State

== 1966 draft ==
Round	Pick #	Overall	Name	Position	College
1	15	15	Sam Ball	Offensive tackle	Kentucky
2	15	31	Butch Allison	Guard	Missouri
3	15	47	Rick Kestner	End	Kentucky
4	6	54	Rod Sherman	Wide receiver	USC
4	15	63	Hoyle Granger	Fullback	Mississippi State
6	15	95	Stan Maliszewski	Linebacker	Princeton
7	10	105	Dave Ellis	Offensive tackle	North Carolina State
7	15	110	Ray Perkins	Flanker	Alabama
8	10	120	Gerald Allen	Halfback	Omaha
8	15	125	Jack White	Quarterback	Penn State
9	15	140	Gerald Gross	Halfback	Auburn
10	15	155	Claude Brownlee	Defensive end	Benedict
11	15	170	Eric Crabtree	Halfback	Pittsburgh
12	15	185	Jim Carter	Guard	Tennessee A&I
13	15	200	Bob Hadrick	End	Purdue
14	15	215	Jim Ward	Quarterback	Gettysburg
15	15	230	Lee Garner	Linebacker	Ole Miss
16	15	245	Rod Stewart	End	Duke
17	15	260	Randy Matson	Offensive tackle	Texas A&M
18	15	275	Ed Toner	Offensive tackle	Massachusetts
19	15	290	Ken Duke	Fullback	Morgan State
20	15	305	Tom Carr	Offensive tackle	Morgan State

== 1967 draft ==
Round	Pick #	Overall	Name	Position	College
1	1	1	Bubba Smith	Defensive end	Michigan State
1	20	20	Jim Detwiler	Halfback	Michigan
2	19	45	Rick Volk	Defensive back	Michigan
3	1	54	Norman Davis	Guard	Grambling
3	18	71	Leon Ward	Linebacker	Oklahoma State
4	20	100	Charlie Stukes	Defensive back	Maryland Eastern Shore
5	19	126	Ron Porter	Linebacker	Idaho
6	4	137	Terry Southall	Quarterback	Baylor
7	20	179	Bo Rein	Flanker	Ohio State
8	17	202	Lee Anderson	Defensive tackle	Bishop College
8	19	204	Cornelius Johnson	Offensive tackle	Virginia Union
9	18	229	Ron Kirkland	Halfback	Nebraska
10	21	258	Leigh Gilbert	Fullback	Northern Illinois
12	1	290	Herman Reed	Offensive tackle	St. Augustine's
12	8	298	Preston Pearson	Defensive back	Illinois
12	17	307	J.B. Christian	Guard	Oklahoma State
13	20	335	Marc Allen	Defensive tackle	West Texas State
14	18	359	Pat Conley	Linebacker	Purdue
15	18	385	Bob Wade	Defensive back	Morgan State
16	20	413	Don Alley	Flanker	Adams State

== 1968 draft ==
Round	Pick #	Overall	Name	Position	College
1	23	23	John Williams	Offensive tackle	Minnesota
2	23	50	Bob Grant	Linebacker	Wake Forest
3	23	78	Rich O'Hara	End	Northern Arizona
4	24	107	Jim Duncan	Defensive back	Maryland Eastern Shore
5	15	126	Paul Elzey	Linebacker	Toledo
7	24	188	Anthony Andrews	Halfback	Hampton Institute
8	24	216	Tommy Davis	Defensive tackle	Tennessee A&I
9	23	242	Terry Cole	Fullback	Indiana
10	11	257	Ocie Austin	Defensive back	Utah State
10	24	270	Ed Tomlin	Fullback	Hampton Institute
11	23	296	Bill Pickens	Guard	Houston
12	24	324	James Jackson	Defensive tackle	Jackson State
13	23	350	Howie Tennebar	Guard	Kent State
14	24	378	Charles Mitchell	Tight end	Alabama State
15	23	404	Jeff Beaver	Quarterback	North Carolina
16	24	432	Walt Blackledge	Flanker	San Jose State
17	23	458	Roy Pederson	Guard	Northern Iowa

== 1969 draft ==
Round	Pick #	Overall	Name	Position	College
1	25	25	Eddie Hinton	Wide receiver	Oklahoma
2	7	33	Ted Hendricks	Linebacker	Miami (FL)
2	25	51	Tom Maxwell	Defensive back	Texas A&M
3	25	77	Dennis Nelson	Offensive tackle	Illinois State
4	9	87	Jackie Stewart	Running back	Texas Tech
5	25	129	King Dunlap	Defensive tackle	Tennessee A&I
6	24	154	Bill Fortier	Guard	LSU
7	7	163	Gary Fleming	Linebacker	Stanford
7	25	181	Roland Moss	Running back	Toledo
8	25	207	Sam Havrilak	Defensive back	Bucknell
9	2	210	George Wright	Defensive tackle	Sam Houston State
9	24	232	Larry Good	Quarterback	Georgia Tech
10	25	259	Marion Griffin	Tight end	Purdue
11	25	285	Ken Delaney	Offensive tackle	Akron
12	24	310	Butch Riley	Linebacker	Texas A&I
13	20	337	Carl Mauck	Linebacker	Southern Illinois
14	25	363	Dave Bartelt	Linebacker	Colorado
15	25	389	George Thompson	Defensive back	Marquette
16	25	415	Jim McMillan	Wide receiver	The Citadel
17	25	441	Joe Cowan	Wide receiver	Johns Hopkins

== 1970 draft ==
Round	Pick #	Overall	Name	Position	College
1	18	18	Norm Bulaich	Running back	TCU
2	18	44	Jim Bailey	Defensive tackle	Kansas
3	18	70	Jim O'Brien	Wide receiver	Cincinnati
3	22	74	Ara Person	Tight end	Morgan State
4	17	95	Steve Smear	Defensive tackle	Penn State
5	18	122	Billy Newsome	Defensive end	Grambling
6	18	148	Ron Gardin	Defensive back	Arizona
7	18	174	Gordon Slade	Quarterback	Davidson
8	18	200	Bob Bouley	Offensive tackle	Boston College
9	18	226	Barney Harris	Defensive back	Texas A&M
10	18	252	Dick Palmer	Linebacker	Kentucky
11	18	278	George Edwards	Running back	Fairmont State
12	18	304	Don Burrell	Wide receiver	Angelo State
13	18	330	Dave Polak	Linebacker	Bowling Green
14	18	356	Tom Curtis	Safety	Michigan
15	18	382	Phillip Gary	Defensive end	Kentucky State
16	18	408	Jack Maitland	Running back	Williams
17	18	434	Alvin Pearman	Running back	Colgate

== 1971 draft ==
Round	Pick #	Overall	Name	Position	College
1	22	22	Don McCauley	Running back	North Carolina
1	26	26	Leonard Dunlap	Defensive back	North Texas State
2	26	52	Bill Atessis	Defensive end	Texas
3	26	78	Karl Douglas	Quarterback	Texas A&I
5	26	130	John Andrews	Tight end	Indiana
6	26	156	Ken Frith	Defensive tackle	Northeast Louisiana
7	26	182	Gordon Bowdell	Wide receiver	Michigan State
8	25	207	Willie Bogan	Defensive back	Dartmouth
9	26	234	Bill Burnett	Running back	Arkansas
10	26	260	Rex Kern	Quarterback	Ohio State
11	26	286	Dave Jones	Linebacker	Baylor
12	8	294	Bob Wuensch	Offensive tackle	Texas
12	26	312	Bill Triplett	Wide receiver	Michigan State
13	26	338	Tom Neville	Linebacker	Yale
14	26	364	Mike Mikolayunas	Running back	Davidson
15	26	390	Mike Hogan	Linebacker	Michigan State
16	26	416	Rich Harrington	Defensive back	Houston
17	25	441	Don Nottingham	Running back	Kent State

== 1972 draft ==
Round	Pick #	Overall	Name	Position	College
1	22	22	Tom Drougas	Offensive tackle	Oregon
2	20	46	Jack Mildren	Defensive back	Oklahoma
2	21	47	Glenn Doughty	Wide receiver	Michigan
2	22	48	Lydell Mitchell	Running back	Penn State
4	26	104	Eric Allen	Wide receiver	Michigan State
5	11	115	Don Croft	Defensive tackle	UTEP
6	22	152	Bruce Laird	Defensive back	American International
7	13	169	John Sykes	Running back	Morgan State
8	9	191	Al Qualls	Linebacker	Oklahoma
8	22	204	Van Brownson	Quarterback	Nebraska
9	7	215	Gary Hambell	Defensive tackle	Dayton
10	22	256	Dave Schilling	Running back	Oregon State
11	22	282	Fred DeBernardi	Defensive end	UTEP
12	22	308	Gary Theiler	Tight end	Tennessee
13	22	334	Herb Washington	Wide receiver	Michigan State
14	21	359	John Morris	Center	Missouri Valley
15	22	386	Robin Parkhouse	Linebacker	Alabama
16	22	412	Gary Wichard	Quarterback	C.W. Post
17	22	438	Stan White	Linebacker	Ohio State

== 1973 draft ==
Round	Pick #	Overall	Name	Position	College
1	2	2	Bert Jones	Quarterback	LSU
1	10	10	Joe Ehrmann	Defensive tackle	Syracuse
2	9	35	Mike Barnes	Defensive end	Miami (FL)
3	9	61	Bill Olds	Running back	Nebraska
3	10	62	Jamie Rotella	Linebacker	Tennessee
4	5	83	Gery Palmer	Offensive tackle	Kansas
4	7	85	Ollie Smith	Wide receiver	Tennessee State
5	10	114	David Taylor	Guard	Catawba
8	7	189	Ray Oldham	Defensive back	Middle Tennessee State
8	9	191	Bill Windauer	Guard	Iowa
11	10	270	Dan Neal	Center	Kentucky
12	9	295	Bernard Thomas	Defensive end	Western Kentucky
13	10	322	Tom Pierantozzi	Quarterback	West Chester
14	9	347	Ed Williams	Running back	West Virginia
15	10	374	Jackie Brown	Defensive back	South Carolina
16	9	399	Marty Januszkiewicz	Running back	Syracuse
17	10	426	Guy Falkenhagen	Offensive tackle	Northern Michigan

== 1974 draft ==
Round	Pick #	Overall	Name	Position	College
1	5	5	John Dutton	Defensive tackle	Nebraska
1	24	24	Roger Carr	Wide receiver	Louisiana Tech
2	6	32	Fred Cook	Defensive end	Southern Miss
2	11	37	Ed Shuttlesworth	Running back	Michigan
3	5	57	Glenn Robinson	Linebacker	Oklahoma State
3	15	67	Bob Pratt	Guard	North Carolina
4	6	84	Tony Bell	Defensive back	Bowling Green
5	25	129	Doug Nettles	Defensive back	Vanderbilt
6	10	140	Danny Rhodes	Linebacker	Arkansas
7	5	161	Noah Jackson	Guard	Tampa
7	14	170	Dan Dickel	Linebacker	Iowa
7	18	174	Freddie Scott	Wide receiver	Amherst
8	6	188	Greg Latta	Tight end	Morgan State
8	16	198	Paul Miles	Running back	Bowling Green
10	6	240	Bob Van Duyne	Guard	Idaho
10	23	257	Glenn Ellis	Defensive tackle	Elon
11	5	265	Tim Rudnick	Defensive back	Notre Dame
12	6	292	Dave Simonson	Offensive tackle	Minnesota
12	21	307	Bob Bobrowski	Quarterback	Purdue
13	5	317	Randy Hall	Defensive back	Idaho
14	6	344	Ed Collins	Wide receiver	Rice
15	5	369	Pat Kelly	Linebacker	Richmond
16	6	396	Dave Margavage	Offensive tackle	Kentucky
17	5	421	Tim Berra	Wide receiver	Massachusetts
17	20	436	Buzzy Lewis	Defensive back	Florida State

== 1975 draft ==
Round	Pick #	Overall	Name	Position	College
1	3	3	Ken Huff	Guard	North Carolina
3	1	53	Mike Washington	Defensive back	Alabama
3	4	56	Dave Pear	Defensive tackle	Washington
4	2	80	Marshall Johnson	Running back	Houston
4	15	93	Paul Linford	Defensive tackle	BYU
5	1	105	Roosevelt Leaks	Running back	Texas
6	1	131	Donald Westbrook	Wide receiver	Nebraska
7	1	157	Kim Jones	Running back	Colorado State
7	4	160	Steve Joachim	Quarterback	Temple
7	12	168	Derrel Luce	Linebacker	Baylor
8	2	184	John Bushong	Defensive end	Western Kentucky
8	5	187	Greg Denboer	Tight end	Michigan
8	10	192	Mario Cage	Running back	Northwestern State
9	1	209	Royce McKinney	Defensive back	Kentucky State
10	2	236	Phil Waganheim	Punter	Maryland
11	1	261	Dave Hazel	Wide receiver	Ohio State
12	2	288	Brad Storm	Linebacker	Iowa State
13	1	313	John Roman	Guard	Idaho State
14	2	340	Mike Smith	Center	SMU
15	1	365	John Goodie	Running back	Langston
16	2	392	Bill Malouf	Wide receiver	Ole Miss
16	9	399	Mike Evavold	Defensive tackle	Macalester
16	26	416	Bob Smith	Defensive back	Maryland
17	1	417	David McKnight	Linebacker	Georgia
17	10	426	Mike Bengard	Defensive end	Northwestern (IA)
17	24	440	Frank Russell	Wide receiver	Maryland

== 1976 draft ==
Round	Pick #	Overall	Name	Position	College
1	20	20	Ken Novak	Defensive tackle	Purdue
3	21	81	Ed Simonini	Linebacker	Texas A&M
3	30	90	Ron Lee	Running back	West Virginia
5	10	134	Sanders Shiver	Linebacker	Carson-Newman
5	19	143	Mike Kirkland	Quarterback	Arkansas
8	19	228	Ricky Thompson	Wide receiver	Baylor
9	21	258	Stu Levenick	Offensive tackle	Illinois
10	18	283	Tim Baylor	Defensive back	Morgan State
11	19	310	Rick Gibney	Defensive tackle	Georgia Tech
12	21	340	Frank Stavroff	Placekicker	Indiana
14	19	394	Jeremiah Cummings	Defensive end	Albany State
15	21	424	Gary Alexander	Offensive tackle	Clemson
16	18	449	Mike Fuhrman	Tight end	Memphis State
16	20	451	Steve Ludwig	Center	Miami (FL)

== 1977 draft ==
Round	Pick #	Overall	Name	Position	College
1	26	26	Randy Burke	Wide receiver	Kentucky
2	25	53	Mike Ozdowski	Defensive end	Virginia
6	24	163	Calvin O'Neal	Linebacker	Michigan
7	26	193	Blanchard Carter	Offensive tackle	UNLV
8	25	220	Ken Helms	Offensive tackle	Georgia
9	24	247	Glenn Capriola	Running back	Boston College
10	26	277	Ron Baker	Guard	Oklahoma State
11	25	304	Brian Ruff	Linebacker	The Citadel
12	24	331	Bill Deutsch	Running back	North Dakota

== 1978 draft ==
Round	Pick #	Overall	Name	Position	College
1	25	25	Reese McCall	Tight end	Auburn
2	24	52	Mike Woods	Linebacker	Cincinnati
5	7	117	Frank Myers	Offensive tackle	Texas A&M
6	23	161	Ben Garry	Running back	Southern Miss
7	25	191	Jeff Logan	Running back	Ohio State
8	24	218	Monte Anthony	Running back	Nebraska
9	23	245	Dave Studdard	Offensive tackle	Texas
10	25	275	Dallas Owens	Defensive back	Kentucky
11	24	302	Henry Mason	Wide receiver	Central Missouri State
12	23	329	Bruce Allen	Punter	Richmond

== 1979 draft ==
Round	Pick #	Overall	Name	Position	College
1	6	6	Barry Krauss	Linebacker	Alabama
3	13	69	Kim Anderson	Defensive back	Arizona State
5	5	115	Larry Braziel	Defensive back	USC
6	13	150	Jimmy Moore	Guard	Ohio State
8	5	197	Steve Heimkreiter	Linebacker	Notre Dame
8	16	208	Nesby Glasgow	Safety	Washington
9	4	224	Russ Henderson	Punter	Virginia
10	6	254	Steve Stephens	Tight end	Oklahoma State
11	5	280	John Priestner	Linebacker	Western Ontario
12	3	306	Charlie Green	Wide receiver	Kansas State

== 1980 draft ==
Round	Pick #	Overall	Name	Position	College
1	5	5	Curtis Dickey	Running back	Texas A&M
1	24	24	Derrick Hatchett	Cornerback	Texas
2	4	32	Ray Donaldson	Center	Georgia
2	23	51	Tim Foley	Offensive tackle	Notre Dame
4	5	88	Ray Butler	Wide receiver	USC
6	6	144	Chris Foote	Center	USC
7	5	170	Wes Roberts	Defensive end	TCU
8	2	195	Ken Walter	Offensive tackle	Texas Tech
9	6	227	Mark Bright	Running back	Temple
10	5	254	Larry Stewart	Offensive tackle	Maryland
11	3	280	Ed Whitley	Tight end	Kansas State
12	6	311	Randy Bielski	Placekicker	Towson
12	19	324	Marvin Sims	Fullback	Clemson

== 1981 draft ==
Round	Pick #	Overall	Name	Position	College
1	12	12	Randy McMillan	Running back	Pittsburgh
1	18	18	Donnell Thompson	Defensive end	North Carolina
3	12	68	Randy Van Divier	Offensive tackle	Washington
4	11	94	Tim Sherwin	Tight end	Boston College
6	11	149	Bubba Green	Defensive tackle	North Carolina State
7	12	178	Obed Ariri	Placekicker	Clemson
8	11	204	Ken Sitton	Defensive back	Oklahoma
8	27	220	Hosea Taylor	Defensive tackle	Houston
9	12	233	Tim Gooch	Defensive end	Kentucky
10	8	256	Gregg Gerken	Linebacker	Northern Arizona
10	11	259	Trent Bryant	Cornerback	Arkansas
11	12	288	Holden Smith	Wide receiver	California
12	11	315	Eric Scoggins	Linebacker	USC

== 1982 draft ==
Round	Pick #	Overall	Name	Position	College
1	2	2	Johnie Cooks	Linebacker	Mississippi State
1	4	4	Art Schlichter	Quarterback	Ohio State
2	1	28	Leo Wisniewski	Defensive tackle	Penn State
2	7	34	Rohn Stark	Punter	Florida State
3	2	57	Jim Burroughs	Defensive back	Michigan State
4	1	84	Mike Pagel	Quarterback	Arizona State
5	2	113	Terry Crouch	Guard	Oklahoma
6	1	140	Pat Beach	Tight end	Washington State
7	2	169	Fletcher Jenkins	Defensive tackle	Washington
8	1	196	Tony Loia	Guard	Arizona State
9	2	225	Tony Berryhill	Center	Clemson
10	1	252	Tom Deery	Defensive back	Widener
11	1	280	Lamont Meacham	Defensive back	Western Kentucky
12	1	307	Johnnie Wright	Running back	South Carolina

== 1983 draft ==
Round	Pick #	Overall	Name	Position	College
1	1	1	John Elway	Quarterback	Stanford
2	1	29	Vernon Maxwell	Linebacker	Arizona State
3	1	57	George Achica	Defensive tackle	USC
4	1	85	Phil Smith	Wide receiver	San Diego State
5	1	113	Sid Abramowitz	Offensive tackle	Tulsa
6	21	161	Grant Feasel	Center	Abilene Christian
7	1	169	Alvin Moore	Running back	Arizona State
9	1	225	Jim Mills	Offensive tackle	Hawaii
9	17	241	Chris Rose	Offensive tackle	Stanford
10	1	252	Ronald Hopkins	Defensive back	Murray State
11	1	280	Jim Bob Taylor	Quarterback	Georgia Tech
12	1	308	Carl Williams	Wide receiver	Texas Southern

== 1984 draft ==
Round	Pick #	Overall	Name	Position	College
1	8	8	Leonard Coleman	Defensive back	Vanderbilt
1	19	19	Ron Solt	Guard	Maryland
2	7	35	Blaise Winter	Defensive tackle	Syracuse
3	10	66	Chris Scott	Defensive end	Purdue
4	9	93	Craig Curry	Defensive back	Texas
4	19	103	George Wonsley	Running back	Mississippi State
5	8	120	Golden Tate	Wide receiver	Tennessee State
5	18	130	Kevin Call	Offensive tackle	Colorado State
6	7	147	Dwight Beverly	Running back	Illinois
8	9	205	Eugene Daniel	Cornerback	LSU
11	10	290	Bob Stowe	Offensive tackle	Illinois
12	9	317	Steve Hathaway	Defensive end	West Virginia

== 1985 draft ==
Round	Pick #	Overall	Name	Position	College
1	5	5	Duane Bickett	Linebacker	USC
2	4	32	Don Anderson	Defensive back	Purdue
3	5	61	Anthony Young	Defensive back	Temple
4	4	88	Willie Broughton	Defensive tackle	Miami (FL)
5	5	117	Roger Caron	Offensive tackle	Harvard
7	5	173	James Harbour	Wide receiver	Ole Miss
8	4	200	Ricky Nichols	Wide receiver	East Carolina
9	5	229	Mark Boyer	Tight end	USC
10	4	256	Andre Pinesett	Defensive tackle	Cal State Fullerton
12	4	312	Dave Burnette	Offensive tackle	Arkansas

== 1986 draft ==
Round	Pick #	Overall	Name	Position	College
1	4	4	Jon Hand	Defensive end	Alabama
2	20	47	Jack Trudeau	Quarterback	Illinois
4	4	86	Billy Brooks	Wide receiver	Boston University
5	7	117	Scott Kellar	Defensive tackle	Northern Illinois
5	14	124	Gary Walker	Center	Boston University
7	5	171	Steve O'Malley	Defensive tackle	Northern Illinois
7	6	172	Chris White	Kicker	Illinois
7	24	190	Tommy Sims	Defensive back	Tennessee
8	4	198	Trell Hooper	Defensive back	Memphis State
9	7	228	Bob Brotzki	Offensive tackle	Syracuse
10	17	266	Pete Anderson	Center	Georgia
12	4	309	Steve Wade	Defensive tackle	Vanderbilt
12	21	326	Isaac Williams	Defensive tackle	Florida State

== 1987 draft ==
Round	Pick #	Overall	Name	Position	College
1	2	2	Cornelius Bennett	Linebacker	Alabama
3	2	58	Chris Gambol	Offensive tackle	Iowa
4	2	85	Randy Dixon	Offensive tackle	Pittsburgh
5	2	114	Roy Banks	Wide receiver	Eastern Illinois
6	2	142	Freddie Robinson	Defensive back	Alabama
7	2	170	Mark Bellini	Wide receiver	BYU
8	5	200	Chuckie Miller	Defensive back	UCLA
9	24	247	Bob Ontko	Linebacker	Penn State
10	2	253	Chris Goode	Defensive back	Alabama
11	2	281	Jim Reynosa	Defensive end	Arizona State
12	2	309	David Adams	Running back	Arizona

== 1988 draft ==
Round	Pick #	Overall	Name	Position	College
3	21	76	Chris Chandler	Quarterback	Washington
4	22	104	Michael Ball	Cornerback	Southern
5	20	129	John Baylor	Defensive back	Southern Miss
9	22	243	Jeff Herrod	Linebacker	Ole Miss
10	21	270	O'Brien Alston	Linebacker	Maryland
11	20	297	Donnie Dee	Tight end	Tulsa
12	3	308	Aatron Kenney	Wide receiver	Wisconsin–Stevens Point
12	22	327	Tim Vesling	Placekicker	Syracuse

== 1989 draft ==
Round	Pick #	Overall	Name	Position	College
1	22	22	Andre Rison	Wide receiver	Michigan State
3	16	72	Mitchell Benson	Defensive tackle	TCU
4	15	99	Pat Tomberlin	Guard	Florida State
6	16	155	Quintus McDonald	Linebacker	Penn State
7	15	182	Ivy Joe Hunter	Running back	Kentucky
7	18	185	Charles Washington	Defensive back	Cameron
8	17	212	Kurt Larson	Linebacker	Michigan State
9	16	239	William Mackall	Wide receiver	Tennessee-Martin
10	15	266	Jim Thompson	Offensive tackle	Auburn
11	17	296	Wayne Johnson	Quarterback	Georgia
12	7	314	William DuBose	Running back	South Carolina State
12	16	323	Steve Taylor	Quarterback	Nebraska

== 1990 draft ==
Round	Pick #	Overall	Name	Position	College
1	1	1	Jeff George	Quarterback	Illinois
2	11	36	Anthony Johnson	Running back	Notre Dame
4	2	83	Stacey Simmons	Wide receiver	Florida
4	13	94	Bill Schultz	Guard	USC
4	22	103	Alan Grant	Defensive back	Stanford
4	25	106	Rick Cunningham	Offensive tackle	Texas A&M
6	11	148	Tony Walker	Linebacker	Southeast Missouri State
7	14	179	James Singletary	Linebacker	East Carolina
8	13	206	Ken Clark	Running back	Nebraska
8	20	213	Harvey Wilson	Defensive back	Southern
9	11	232	Darvell Huffman	Wide receiver	Boston University
11	14	290	Carnel Smith	Defensive end	Pittsburgh
12	7	311	Gene Benhart	Quarterback	Western Illinois
12	12	316	Dean Brown	Guard	Notre Dame

== 1991 draft ==
Round	Pick #	Overall	Name	Position	College
2	13	40	Shane Curry	Defensive end	Miami (FL)
3	14	69	Dave McCloughan	Defensive back	Colorado
4	13	96	Mark Vander Poel	Offensive tackle	Colorado
5	14	125	Kerry Cash	Tight end	Texas
6	13	152	Mel Agee	Defensive tackle	Illinois
7	14	181	James Bradley	Wide receiver	Michigan State
8	13	208	Tim Bruton	Tight end	Missouri
9	13	236	Howard Griffith	Fullback	Illinois
10	13	263	Frank Giannetti	Defensive end	Penn State
11	14	292	Jerry Crafts	Offensive tackle	Louisville
12	13	319	Rob Luedeke	Center	Penn State

== 1992 draft ==
Round	Pick #	Overall	Name	Position	College
1	1	1	Steve Emtman	Defensive end	Washington
1	2	2	Quentin Coryatt	Linebacker	Texas A&M
2	1	29	Ashley Ambrose	Cornerback	Mississippi Valley State
4	1	85	Rodney Culver	Running back	Notre Dame
4	21	105	Tony McCoy	Defensive tackle	Florida
5	1	113	Maury Toy	Running back	UCLA
6	1	141	Shoun Habersham	Wide receiver	Tennessee-Chattanooga
7	1	169	Derek Steele	Defensive end	Maryland
8	1	197	Jason Belser	Defensive back	Oklahoma
8	16	212	Ronald Humphrey	Running back	Mississippi Valley State
9	1	225	Eddie Miller	Wide receiver	South Carolina
10	1	253	Steve Grant	Linebacker	West Virginia
12	1	309	Michael Brandon	Defensive end	Florida

== 1993 draft ==
Round	Pick #	Overall	Name	Position	College
1	16	16	Sean Dawkins	Wide receiver	California
2	20	49	Roosevelt Potts	Running back	Louisiana-Monroe
3	9	65	Ray Buchanan	Defensive back	Louisville
4	8	92	Derwin Gray	Defensive back	Brigham Young
4	23	107	Devon McDonald	Linebacker	Notre Dame
6	17	157	Carlos Etheredge	Tight end	Miami (FL)
7	16	184	Lance Lewis	Running back	Nebraska
8	15	211	Marquise Thomas	Linebacker	Ole Miss

== 1994 draft ==
Round	Pick #	Overall	Name	Position	College
1	2	2	Marshall Faulk	Running back	San Diego State
1	5	5	Trev Alberts	Linebacker	Nebraska
2	3	32	Eric Mahlum	Guard	California
3	2	67	Jason Mathews	Offensive tackle	Texas A&M
4	3	106	Bradford Banta	Tight end	USC
5	2	133	John Covington	Defensive back	Notre Dame
6	3	164	Lamont Warren	Running back	Colorado
7	2	196	Lance Teichelman	Defensive tackle	Texas A&M

== 1995 draft ==
Round	Pick #	Overall	Name	Position	College
1	15	15	Ellis Johnson	Defensive tackle	Florida
2	16	48	Ken Dilger	Tight end	Illinois
3	15	79	Zack Crockett	Fullback	Florida State
4	16	114	Ray McElroy	Defensive back	Eastern Illinois
5	15	149	Derek West	Offensive tackle	Colorado
6	16	187	Brian Gelzheiser	Linebacker	Penn State
7	15	223	Jessie Cox	Linebacker	Texas Southern

== 1996 draft ==
Round	Pick #	Overall	Name	Position	College
1	19	19	Marvin Harrison	Wide receiver	Syracuse
2	21	51	Dedric Mathis	Cornerback	Houston
3	21	82	Scott Slutzker	Tight end	Iowa
4	20	115	Brian Milne	Fullback	Penn State
5	19	151	Steve Martin	Defensive tackle	Missouri
6	24	191	Keith Conlin	Offensive tackle	Penn State
6	38	205	Mike Cawley	Quarterback	James Madison
7	23	232	Adrian Robinson	Safety	Baylor

== 1997 draft ==
Round	Pick #	Overall	Name	Position	College
1	19	19	Tarik Glenn	Offensive tackle	California
2	18	48	Adam Meadows	Offensive tackle	Georgia
3	26	86	Bertrand Berry	Linebacker	Notre Dame
4	21	117	Monty Montgomery	Defensive back	Houston
5	20	150	Nate Jacquet	Wide receiver	San Diego State
5	26	156	Carl Powell	Defensive end	Louisville
6	19	182	Scott von der Ahe	Linebacker	Arizona State
7	18	219	Clarence Thompson	Defensive back	Knoxville College

== 1998 draft ==
Round	Pick #	Overall	Name	Position	College
1	1	1	Peyton Manning	Quarterback	Tennessee
2	2	32	Jerome Pathon	Wide receiver	Washington
3	10	71	E. G. Green	Wide receiver	Florida State
4	1	93	Steve McKinney	Guard	Texas A&M
5	12	135	Antony Jordan	Linebacker	Vanderbilt
7	1	190	Aaron Taylor	Guard	Nebraska
7	42	231	Corey Gaines	Defensive back	Tennessee

== 1999 draft ==
Round	Pick #	Overall	Name	Position	College
1	4	4	Edgerrin James	Running back	Miami (FL)
2	5	36	Mike Peterson	Linebacker	Florida
3	2	63	Brandon Burlsworth	Guard	Arkansas
4	1	96	Paul Miranda	Cornerback	Central Florida
5	5	138	Brad Scioli	Defensive end	Penn State
7	4	210	Hunter Smith	Punter	Notre Dame
7	44	250	Corey Terry	Linebacker	Tennessee

== 2000 draft ==
Round	Pick #	Overall	Name	Position	College
1	28	28	Rob Morris	Linebacker	Brigham Young
2	28	59	Marcus Washington	Linebacker	Auburn
3	29	91	David Macklin	Cornerback	Penn State
4	28	122	Josh Williams	Defensive tackle	Michigan
5	9	138	Matt Johnson	Center	Brigham Young
7	29	235	Rob Renes	Defensive tackle	Michigan
7	32	238	Rodregis Brooks	Cornerback	UAB

== 2001 draft ==
Round	Pick #	Overall	Name	Position	College
1	30	30	Reggie Wayne	Wide receiver	Miami (FL)
2	6	37	Idrees Bashir	Safety	Memphis
3	29	91	Cory Bird	Safety	Virginia Tech
4	23	118	Ryan Diem	Offensive tackle	Northern Illinois
5	21	152	Raymond Walls	Cornerback	Southern Miss
6	30	193	Jason Doering	Safety	Wisconsin
7	20	220	Rick DeMulling	Guard	Idaho State

== 2002 draft ==
Round	Pick #	Overall	Name	Position	College
1	11	11	Dwight Freeney	Defensive end	Syracuse
2	10	42	Larry Tripplett	Defensive tackle	Washington
3	9	74	Joseph Jefferson	Safety	Western Kentucky
4	8	106	David Thornton	Linebacker	North Carolina
6	10	182	David Pugh	Defensive tackle	Virginia Tech
6	11	183	James Lewis	Defensive back	Miami (FL)
6	32	204	Brian Allen	Running back	Stanford
7	9	220	Josh Mallard	Defensive end	Georgia

== 2003 draft ==
Round	Pick #	Overall	Name	Position	College
1	24	24	Dallas Clark	Tight end	Iowa
2	26	58	Mike Doss	Safety	Ohio State
3	26	90	Donald Strickland	Cornerback	Colorado
4	25	122	Steve Sciullo	Guard	Marshall
5	3	138	Robert Mathis	Defensive end	Alabama A&M
5	27	162	Kenyon Whiteside	Linebacker	Tennessee
6	25	198	Cato June	Linebacker	Michigan
6	35	208	Makoa Freitas	Offensive tackle	Arizona

== 2004 draft ==
Round	Pick #	Overall	Name	Position	College
2	12	44	Bob Sanders	Safety	Iowa
3	5	68	Ben Hartsock	Tight end	Ohio State
3	6	69	Gilbert Gardner	Linebacker	Purdue
4	11	107	Kendyll Pope	Linebacker	Florida State
4	29	125	Jason David	Cornerback	Washington State
5	9	141	Jake Scott	Guard	Idaho
6	8	173	Von Hutchins	Cornerback	Ole Miss
6	28	193	Jim Sorgi	Quarterback	Wisconsin
7	28	229	David Kimball	Placekicker	Penn State

== 2005 draft ==
Round	Pick #	Overall	Name	Position	College
1	29	29	Marlin Jackson	Cornerback	Michigan
2	28	60	Kelvin Hayden	Cornerback	Illinois
3	28	92	Vincent Burns	Defensive end	Kentucky
4	28	129	Dylan Gandy	Guard	Texas Tech
4	34	135	Matt Giordano	Safety	California
5	12	148	Jonathan Welsh	Defensive end	Wisconsin
5	29	165	Robert Hunt	Center	North Dakota State
5	37	173	Tyjuan Hagler	Linebacker	Cincinnati
6	28	202	Dave Rayner	Placekicker	Michigan State
7	29	243	Anthony Davis	Running back	Wisconsin

== 2006 draft ==
Round	Pick #	Overall	Name	Position	College
1	30	30	Joseph Addai	Running back	LSU
2	30	62	Tim Jennings	Cornerback	Georgia
3	30	94	Freddie Keiaho	Linebacker	San Diego State
5	29	162	Michael Toudouze	Guard	TCU
6	30	199	Charlie Johnson	Offensive tackle	Oklahoma State
6	38	207	Antoine Bethea	Safety	Howard
7	30	238	T.J. Rushing	Cornerback	Stanford

== 2007 draft ==
Round	Pick #	Overall	Name	Position	College
1	32	32	Anthony Gonzalez	Wide receiver	Ohio State
2	10	42	Tony Ugoh	Offensive tackle	Arkansas
3	31	95	Daymeion Hughes	Cornerback	California
3	34	98	Quinn Pitcock	Defensive tackle	Ohio State
4	32	131	Brannon Condren	Safety	Troy
4	37	136	Clint Session	Linebacker	Pittsburgh
5	32	169	Roy Hall	Wide receiver	Ohio State
5	36	173	Michael Coe	Cornerback	Alabama State
7	32	232	Keyunta Dawson	Linebacker	Texas Tech

== 2008 draft ==
Round	Pick #	Overall	Name	Position	College
2	28	59	Mike Pollak	Center	Arizona State
3	30	93	Philip Wheeler	Linebacker	Georgia Tech
4	28	127	Jacob Tamme	Tight end	Kentucky
5	26	161	Marcus Howard	Linebacker	Georgia
6	30	196	Tom Santi	Tight end	Virginia
6	35	201	Steve Justice	Center	Wake Forest
6	36	202	Mike Hart	Running back	Michigan
6	39	205	Pierre Garçon	Wide receiver	Mount Union
7	29	236	Jamey Richard	Center	Buffalo

== 2009 draft ==
Round	Pick #	Overall	Name	Position	College
1	27	27	Donald Brown	Running back	Connecticut
2	24	56	Fili Moala	Defensive tackle	USC
3	28	92	Jerraud Powers	Cornerback	Auburn
4	27	127	Austin Collie	Wide receiver	Brigham Young
4	36	136	Terrance Taylor	Defensive tackle	Michigan
6	28	201	Curtis Painter	Quarterback	Purdue
7	13	222	Pat McAfee	Kicker	West Virginia
7	27	236	Jaimie Thomas	Guard	Maryland

== 2010 draft ==
Round	Pick #	Overall	Name	Position	College
1	31	31	Jerry Hughes	Defensive end	TCU
2	31	63	Pat Angerer	Linebacker	Iowa
3	30	94	Kevin Thomas	Cornerback	USC
4	31	129	Jacques McClendon	Guard	Tennessee
5	31	162	Brody Eldridge	Tight end	Oklahoma
7	31	238	Ricardo Mathews	Defensive end	Cincinnati
7	33	240	Kavell Conner	Linebacker	Clemson
7	39	246	Ray Fisher	Cornerback	Indiana

== 2011 draft ==
Round	Pick #	Overall	Name	Position	College
1	22	22	Anthony Castonzo	Offensive tackle	Boston College
2	17	49	Benjamin Ijalana	Offensive tackle	Villanova
3	23	87	Drake Nevis	Defensive tackle	Louisiana State
4	22	119	Delone Carter	Running back	Syracuse
6	23	188	Chris Rucker	Cornerback	Michigan State

== 2012 draft ==
Round	Pick #	Overall	Name	Position	College
1	1	1	Andrew Luck	Quarterback	Stanford
2	2	34	Coby Fleener	Tight end	Stanford
3	1	64	Dwayne Allen	Tight end	Clemson
3	29	92	T. Y. Hilton	Wide receiver	Florida International
5	1	136	Josh Chapman	Defensive tackle	Alabama
5	35	170	Vick Ballard	Running back	Mississippi State
6	36	206	LaVon Brazill	Wide receiver	Ohio
7	1	208	Justin Anderson	Guard	Georgia
7	7	214	Tim Fugger	Defensive end	Vanderbilt
7	46	253	Chandler Harnish	Quarterback	Northern Illinois

== 2013 draft ==
Round	Pick #	Overall	Name	Position	College
1	24	24	Björn Werner	Defensive end	Florida State
3	24	86	Hugh Thornton	Guard	Illinois
4	24	121	Khaled Holmes	Center	USC
5	6	139	Montori Hughes	Defensive tackle	Tennessee-Martin
6	24	192	John Boyett	Safety	Oregon
7	24	230	Kerwynn Williams	Running back	Utah State
7	48	254	Justice Cunningham	Tight end	South Carolina

== 2014 draft ==
Round	Pick #	Overall	Name	Position	College
2	27	59	Jack Mewhort	Guard	Ohio State
3	26	90	Donte Moncrief	Wide receiver	Ole Miss
5	26	155	Jonathan Newsome	Defensive end	Ball State
6	27	203	Andrew Jackson	Linebacker	Western Kentucky
7	17	232	Ulrick John	Guard	Georgia State

== 2015 draft ==
Round	Pick #	Overall	Name	Position	College
1	29	29	Phillip Dorsett	Wide receiver	Miami (FL)
3	1	65	D'Joun Smith	Cornerback	Florida Atlantic
3	29	93	Henry Anderson	Defensive end	Stanford
4	10	109	Clayton Geathers	Strong Safety	Central Florida
5	15	151	David Parry	Defensive tackle	Stanford
6	29	205	Josh Robinson	Running back	Mississippi State
6	31	207	Amarlo Herrera	Linebacker	Georgia
7	38	255	Denzell Goode	Offensive tackle	Mars Hill

== 2016 draft ==
Round	Pick #	Overall	Name	Position	College
1	18	18	Ryan Kelly	Center	Alabama
2	26	57	T. J. Green	Safety	Clemson
3	19	82	Le'Raven Clark	Offensive tackle	Texas Tech
4	18	116	Hassan Ridgeway	Defensive tackle	Texas
4	27	125	Antonio Morrison	Linebacker	Florida
5	17	155	Joe Haeg	Offensive tackle	North Dakota State
7	18	239	Trevor Bates	Linebacker	Maine
7	27	248	Austin Blythe	Center	Iowa

== 2017 draft ==
Round	Pick #	Overall	Name	Position	College
1	15	15	Malik Hooker	Safety	Ohio State
2	14	46	Quincy Wilson	Cornerback	Florida
3	16	80	Tarell Basham	Defensive end	Ohio
4	31	137	Zach Banner	Offensive tackle	USC
4	37	143	Marlon Mack	Running back	South Florida
4	38	144	Grover Stewart	Defensive tackle	Albany State
5	14	158	Nate Hairston	Cornerback	Temple
5	17	161	Anthony Walker Jr.	Linebacker	Northwestern

== 2018 draft ==
Round	Pick #	Overall	Name	Position	College
1	6	6	Quenton Nelson	Guard	Notre Dame
2	4	36	Shaquille Leonard	Linebacker	South Carolina State
2	5	37	Braden Smith	Guard	Auburn
2	20	52	Kemoko Turay	Defensive end	Rutgers
2	32	64	Tyquan Lewis	Defensive end	Ohio State
4	4	104	Nyheim Hines	Running back	North Carolina State
5	22	159	Daurice Fountain	Wide receiver	Northern Iowa
5	32	169	Jordan Wilkins	Running back	Ole Miss
6	11	185	Deon Cain	Wide receiver	Clemson
7	3	221	Matthew Adams	Linebacker	Houston
7	17	235	Zaire Franklin	Linebacker	Syracuse

== 2019 draft ==
Round	Pick #	Overall	Name	Position	College
2	2	34	Rock Ya-Sin	Cornerback	Temple
2	17	49	Ben Banogu	Defensive end	TCU
2	27	59	Parris Campbell	Wide receiver	Ohio State
3	26	89	Bobby Okereke	Linebacker	Stanford
4	7	109	Khari Willis	Safety	Michigan State
5	6	144	Marvell Tell	Safety	USC
5	26	164	E. J. Speed	Linebacker	Tarleton State
6	27	199	Gerri Green	Linebacker	Mississippi State
7	26	240	Jackson Barton	Offensive tackle	Utah
7	32	246	Javon Patterson	Center	Ole Miss

== 2020 draft ==
Round	Pick #	Overall	Name	Position	College
2	2	34	Michael Pittman Jr.	Wide receiver	USC
2	9	41	Jonathan Taylor	Running back	Wisconsin
3	21	85	Julian Blackmon	Safety	Utah
4	16	122	Jacob Eason	Quarterback	Washington
5	3	149	Danny Pinter	Guard	Ball State
6	14	193	Robert Windsor	Defensive tackle	Penn State
6	32	211	Isaiah Rodgers	Cornerback	UMass
6	33	212	Dezmon Patmon	Wide receiver	Washington State
6	34	213	Jordan Glasgow	Safety	Michigan

== 2021 draft ==
Round	Pick #	Overall	Name	Position	College
1	21	21	Kwity Paye	Defensive end	Michigan
2	22	54	Dayo Odeyingbo	Defensive end	Vanderbilt
4	22	127	Kylen Granson	Tight end	SMU
5	21	165	Shawn Davis	Safety	Florida
6	34	218	Sam Ehlinger	Quarterback	Texas
7	1	229	Michael Strachan	Wide receiver	Charleston (WV)
7	21	248	Will Fries	Guard	Penn State

== 2022 draft ==
Round	Pick #	Overall	Name	Position	College
2	21	53	Alec Pierce	Wide receiver	Cincinnati
3	9	73	Jelani Woods	Tight end	Virginia
3	13	77	Bernhard Raimann	Offensive tackle	Central Michigan
3	32	96	Nick Cross	Safety	Maryland
5	16	159	Eric Johnson	Defensive tackle	Missouri State
6	13	192	Drew Ogletree	Tight end	Youngstown State
6	38	216	Curtis Brooks	Defensive tackle	Cincinnati
7	18	239	Rodney Thomas II	Safety	Yale

== 2023 draft ==
Round	Pick #	Overall	Name	Position	College
1	4	4	Anthony Richardson	Quarterback	Florida
2	4	44	JuJu Brents	Cornerback	Kansas State
3	16	79	Josh Downs	Wide receiver	North Carolina
4	4	106	Blake Freeland	Offensive tackle	BYU
4	8	110	Adetomiwa Adebawore	Defensive end	Northwestern
5	3	138	Darius Rush	Cornerback	South Carolina
5	23	158	Daniel Scott	Safety	California
5	27	162	Will Mallory	Tight end	Miami (FL)
5	41	175	Evan Hull	Running back	Northwestern
6	34	211	Titus Leo	Linebacker	Wagner
7	4	221	Jaylon Jones	Cornerback	Texas A&M
7	19	236	Jake Witt	Offensive tackle	Northern Michigan

== 2024 draft ==
Round	Pick #	Overall	Name	Position	College
1	15	15	Laiatu Latu	Defensive end	UCLA
2	20	52	Adonai Mitchell	Wide receiver	Texas
3	15	79	Matt Goncalves	Offensive tackle	Pittsburgh
4	17	117	Tanor Bortolini	Center	Wisconsin
5	7	142	Anthony Gould	Wide receiver	Missouri
5	16	151	Jaylon Carlies	Safety	Missouri
5	29	164	Jaylin Simpson	Safety	Auburn
6	25	201	Micah Abraham	Cornerback	Marshall
7	14	234	Jonah Laulu	Defensive tackle	Oklahoma

== 2025 draft ==
Round	Pick #	Overall	Name	Position	College
1	14	14	Tyler Warren	Tight end	Penn State
2	13	45	JT Tuimoloau	Defensive end	Ohio State
3	16	80	Justin Walley	Cornerback	Minnesota
4	25	127	Jalen Travis	Offensive tackle	Iowa State
5	14	151	DJ Giddens	Running back	Kansas State
6	13	189	Riley Leonard	Quarterback	Notre Dame
6	14	190	Tim Smith	Defensive tackle	Alabama
7	16	232	Hunter Wohler	Safety	Wisconsin

== 2026 draft ==
Round	Pick #	Overall	Name	Position	College
2	21	53	CJ Allen	Linebacker	Georgia
3	14	78	A. J. Haulcy	Safety	LSU
4	13	113	Jalen Farmer	Guard	Kentucky
4	35	135	Bryce Boettcher	Linebacker	Oregon
5	16	156	George Gumbs Jr.	Defensive end	Florida
6	33	214	Caden Curry	Defensive end	Ohio State
7	38	254	Deion Burks	Wide receiver	Oklahoma

== See also ==
- List of Indianapolis Colts first-round draft picks
- List of professional American football drafts
