= List of Toledo Rockets in the NFL draft =

This is a list of Toledo Rockets football players in the NFL draft.

== Key ==
B	Back	K	Kicker	C	Center
LB	Linebacker	FB	Fullback	DB	Defensive back
CB	Cornerback	P	Punter	HB	Halfback
DE	Defensive end	QB	Quarterback	WR	Wide receiver
DT	Defensive tackle	RB	Running back	G	Guard
E	End	T	Offensive tackle	TE	Tight end

== Selections ==
Year	Round	Pick	Player	Team	Position
1939	20	185	Tony Popp	Brooklyn Dodgers	E
1940	10	83	Frank Maher	Philadelphia Eagles	B
1941	15	134	Warren Desmore	Cleveland Rams	C
1941	19	177	Bob Hayes	Green Bay Packers	E
1948	27	247	Frank Pizza	Detroit Lions	T
1948	31	290	Ted Zuchowski	Pittsburgh Steelers	T
1950	12	156	Emerson Cole	Cleveland Browns	B
1953	21	252	Dick Gordon	Los Angeles Rams	T
1954	6	72	Asa Jenkins	Cleveland Browns	B
1954	17	205	Richard Kaser	Detroit Lions	B
1955	5	56	Mel Triplett	New York Giants	B
1955	15	173	George Machoukas	Green Bay Packers	C
1958	13	147	Gene Cook	Green Bay Packers	E
1960	19	224	Jack Campbell	Cleveland Browns	E
1963	5	68	Frank Baker	Cleveland Browns	B
1963	15	197	Larry Campbell	Los Angeles Rams	E
1963	15	198	Ed Scrutchins	St. Louis Cardinals	E
1963	16	217	Jim Bogdalek	San Francisco 49ers	T
1964	16	221	Wynn Lembright	New York Giants	T
1965	14	195	Dan Simrell	Cleveland Browns	QB
1965	16	216	Jim Gray	Philadelphia Eagles	B
1966	17	246	Lurley Archambeau	Atlanta Falcons	C
1968	5	126	Paul Elzey	Baltimore Colts	LB
1968	7	170	John Schneider	Boston Patriots	QB
1968	12	318	Ray Hayes	New York Jets	DT
1968	12	319	Tom Beutler	Cleveland Browns	LB
1969	7	181	Roland Moss	Baltimore Colts	RB
1970	4	81	Curtis Jackson	Miami Dolphins	DB
1970	6	137	James Manuel	St. Louis Cardinals	T
1970	11	269	Danny Crockett	San Francisco 49ers	WR
1971	4	101	Tony Harris	San Francisco 49ers	RB
1971	15	369	Charles Cole	Buffalo Bills	RB
1972	4	87	John Saunders	Los Angeles Rams	DB
1972	11	278	Mel Long	Cleveland Browns	LB
1973	14	350	Joe Schwartz	New York Jets	RB
1976	4	97	Gene Swick	Cleveland Browns	QB
1982	7	177	Jeff Jackson	Los Angeles Raiders	DE
1983	9	239	Rod Achter	Minnesota Vikings	WR
1984	9	252	Mike Russell	Houston Oilers	LB
1986	7	192	Brent Williams	New England Patriots	DE
1991	8	204	Jerry Evans	Phoenix Cardinals	TE
1992	4	93	Darren Anderson	New England Patriots	DB
1992	11	307	Vince Marrow	Buffalo Bills	TE
1993	1	11	Dan Williams	Denver Broncos	DE
1998	4	116	Clarence Love	Philadelphia Eagles	DB
2002	6	207	Chester Taylor	Baltimore Ravens	RB
2003	7	256	Carl Ford	Green Bay Packers	WR
2005	3	100	Nick Kaczur	New England Patriots	G
2006	6	194	Bruce Gradkowski	Tampa Bay Buccaneers	QB
2008	3	65	John Greco	St. Louis Rams	T
2008	6	176	Jalen Parmele	Miami Dolphins	RB
2017	3	86	Kareem Hunt	Kansas City Chiefs	RB
2017	4	127	Michael Roberts	Detroit Lions	TE
2017	7	244	Treyvon Hester	Oakland Raiders	DT
2018	7	249	Logan Woodside	Cincinnati Bengals	QB
2019	3	66	Diontae Johnson	Pittsburgh Steelers	WR
2019	6	185	Ka'dar Hollman	Green Bay Packers	DB
2022	5	166	Tycen Anderson	Cincinnati Bengals	DB
2022	5	172	Samuel Womack	San Francisco 49ers	DB
2023	7	259	Desjuan Johnson	Los Angeles Rams	DT
2024	1	22	Quinyon Mitchell	Philadelphia Eagles	DB
2025	3	65	Darius Alexander	New York Giants	DT
2026	2	58	Emmanuel McNeil-Warren	Cleveland Browns	S
2026	7	236	Andre Fuller	Seattle Seahawks	CB

== Notable undrafted players ==
Note: No drafts held before 1920

Year	Player	Position	Debut Team	Notes
1982	Mike Kennedy	S	Atlanta Falcons	—
1983	Darryl Meadows	DB	Houston Oilers	—
1987	Bob Beemer	DE	Detroit Lions	—
1987	Dexter Clark	RB	Detroit Lions	—
1987	Tim Inglis	LB	Cincinnati Bengals	—
1987	Bryant Jones	DB	Indianapolis Colts	—
1987	John Thomas	T	New York Jets	—
1987	Mike Varajon	RB	San Francisco 49ers	—
1995	Tyrone Brown	WR	Atlanta Falcons	—
2025	Jerjuan Newton	WR	Denver Broncos	—
