= 1967 Toledo Rockets football team =

American college football season

1967 Toledo Rockets football

MAC co-champion
- Conference: Mid-American Conference
- Record: 9–1 (5–1 MAC)
- Head coach: Frank Lauterbur (5th season)
- Captains: John Schneider; Tom Beutler
- Home stadium: Glass Bowl

1967 Mid-American Conference football standings
	Conf.					Overall
Team	W		L		T	W		L		T
Toledo +	5	–	1	–	0	9	–	1	–	0
Ohio +	5	–	1	–	0	6	–	4	–	0
Miami (OH)	4	–	2	–	0	6	–	4	–	0
Western Michigan	4	–	2	–	0	5	–	4	–	0
Bowling Green	2	–	4	–	0	6	–	4	–	0
Kent State	1	–	5	–	0	4	–	6	–	0
Marshall	0	–	6	–	0	0	–	10	–	0
+ – Conference co-champions; Kent State forfeited a conference win over Ohio.

The 1967 Toledo Rockets football team was an American football team that represented the University of Toledo in the Mid-American Conference (MAC) during the 1967 NCAA University Division football season. In their fifth season under head coach Frank Lauterbur, the Rockets compiled a 9–1 record (5–1 against MAC opponents), tied with Ohio for the MAC championship, and outscored all opponents by a combined total of 266 to 83. After opening the season with a loss to Ohio, Toledo won nine consecutive games, part of a 12-game winning streak that extended into the 1968 season.

The 1967 defense was one of the toughest in program history. In total defense, the team allowed 198.4 yards per game, the fourth best in program history. The scoring defense, at 8.3 points per game, ranks fifth in program history. The total of 12 touchdowns allowed ranks third in program history. In a game against Ohio, the Rockets did not allow a single rushing first down. The Rockets held Northern Illinois to -109 rushing yards, which remains a program record. The 13 punts by Northern Illinois also remains tied for a program record for most punts forced.

The team's statistical leaders on offense included John Schneider with 1,650 passing yards, Roland Moss with 833 rushing yards, and Pete Kramer with 556 receiving yards and 96 points scored. Schneider and Tom Beutler were the team captains.

Attendance at Toledo's home football games totaled 84,455 in 1967, an average of 14,076 per game.

== Schedule ==
Date	Opponent	Site	Result	Attendance	Source
September 16	Ohio	Glass Bowl; Toledo, OH	L 14–20	18,126	
September 23	at Xavier*	Xavier Stadium; Cincinnati, OH	W 24–7	10,249	
September 30	at Marshall	Fairfield Stadium; Huntington, WV	W 14–7	5,300	
October 14	at Bowling Green	Doyt Perry Stadium; Bowling Green, OH (rivalry)	W 33–0	20,547	
October 21	Western Michigan	Glass Bowl; Toledo, OH	W 35–9	17,123	
October 28	Kent State	Glass Bowl; Toledo, OH	W 14–13	16,105	
November 4	at Miami (OH)	Miami Field; Oxford, OH	W 24–14	14,835	
November 11	Northern Illinois*	Glass Bowl; Toledo, OH	W 35–0	8,810	
November 18	Dayton*	Glass Bowl; Toledo, OH	W 21–7	10,216	
November 23	Villanova*	Glass Bowl; Toledo, OH	W 52–6	14,075	
*Non-conference game

== After the season ==
=== NFL/AFL draft ===
The following Rockets were selected in the 1968 NFL/AFL draft following the season.

Round	Pick	Player	Position	NFL club
5	126	Paul Elzey	Linebacker	Baltimore Colts
7	170	John Schneider	Quarterback	Boston Patriots
12	318	Ray Hayes	Defensive tackle	New York Jets
12	319	Tom Beutler	Linebacker	Cleveland Browns
