= Leo Strang =

American football coach (1922–1996)

Biographical details
- Born: December 12, 1922; Ashland, Ohio, U.S.
- Died: April 16, 1996 (aged 73); Akron, Ohio, U.S.

Playing career
- 1946–1949: Ashland
- Position: Halfback

Coaching career (HC unless noted)
- 1950: Caldwell HS (OH)
- 1951–1955: Upper Sandusky HS (OH)
- 1956–1957: Shaw HS (OH)
- 1958–1963: Massillon Washington HS (OH)
- 1964–1967: Kent State

Administrative career (AD unless noted)
- 1958–1964: Massillon Washington HS (OH)

Head coaching record
- Overall: 16–21–2 (college); 109–26–1 (high school)

Leo E. Strang (December 12, 1922 – April 16, 1996) was an American football coach. He began his coaching career at the high school football level in the state of Ohio. He served as the head football at Massillon Washington High School in Massillon, Ohio from 1958 to 1963, leading his teams there to two national titles and three consecutive Ohio state championships. His career record as a high school coach was 109–26–1 over 14 seasons. Strang was then the head football coach at Kent State University from 1964 to 1967, compiling a record of 16–21–2 in four seasons.

Strang became the second Ohio high school coach, after Paul Brown, to make the direct leap from high school to a major college Ohio football program when he was hired by Kent State in 1963. He was nationally recognized as innovator who pioneered the use of a barefooted soccer-style placekicker, vinyl helmet team logos and helmet awards for outstanding play, white football shoes, a defensive analyzation circuit board to help call offensive plays, a point-based high school playoff system, and an unbalanced line Wing T offense.

== Coaching career ==
=== High school ===
After graduating from Ashland College in June 1950, Strang began his coaching career when he was hired the following month as the new coach at Caldwell High School in Caldwell, Ohio. After posting a 5–4 record at Caldwell in 1950, Strang took the head coaching job in 1951 at Upper Sandusky High School in Upper Sandusky, Ohio, where over five seasons he led the Rams to a 35–10 record, two conference titles and share of a third, an undefeated, 9–0 season, and a ninth-place finish in the state. At Upper Sandusky, he coached Dave McClain, who went on to coach the Wisconsin Badgers to the program's first bowl game victory in 1982. In 1956, Strang was hired head football coach at Shaw High School in East Cleveland, Ohio, where over two seasons he led Shaw to a 16–3 record, conference titles, and an eighth-place finish in the state in 1957. At Shaw, Strang had the nation's first barefooted, soccer-style placekicker, Austrian immigrant Mario Gerhardt. There he also coached Tom Matte, who went on to become a college All-American at Ohio State University and a two-time Pro Bowler and a Super Bowl champion running back for the Baltimore Colts of the National Football League (NFL).

Strang was hired as the head football coach at athletic director at Massillon Washington High School in Massillon, Ohio in 1958. He led the Massillon Tigers to a record of 54–8–1 record in sixth season, three consecutive Ohio state titles, and two national titles. Of his players, 21 were All-Ohio sections and 14 were high school All-Americans. Strang was named the Ohio High School Football Coach of the Year in 1959. At Massillon, Strang introduced many football innovations, including the first use of vinyl helmet logos (the "Leaping Tiger", in 1958) and helmet award decals (stars, in 1959), white shoes, multicolored interchangeable uniforms, use of the Wing T formation with an unbalanced line, and a defensive analyzation circuit board. Commenting on his uniform innovations, one sportswriter wrote, "Many athletic authorities recognize Strang as the most influential coach in American football in the trend of outfitting and designing football 'wardrobes.'" At Massilon, Strang coached Bob Vogel, who was later an All-American at Ohio State and a five-time All-Pro at tackle and a Super Bowl champion for the Baltimore Colts. He also coached Joe Sparma, who played football and baseball at Ohio State and was a World Series champion pitcher for the Detroit Tigers of Major League Baseball (MLB).

Strang was inducted into the Ohio High School Football Coaches Hall of Fame in 1979. In 2018, Kevin Askeland of MaxPreps ranked as him one of the nation's 50 all-time greatest high school football coaches.

=== College ===
In 1964, Strang was hired as the head football coach at Kent State University, taking over a program that had won only eight games in during the prior three seasons and had endured a seven-game losing streak during that time. He led Kent to its first winning season in a half-decade which was its first at the major college level. He led the Kent State Golden Flashes to the team's longest unbeaten streak since 1956, which was not surpassed until 1973. His Kent teams set two National Collegiate Athletic Association (NCAA) rushing records, had the nation's second leading rusher, led the nation pass defense, point after touchdown (PAT) percentage, and percentage increase in attendance. His players included Jim Corrigall, Kent State's first major college All-American and later a member of the Canadian Football Hall of Fame, and Don Nottingham, who was later Super Bowl champion running back for the Miami Dolphins. After finishing the 1967 season with consecutive wins over Louisville, Marshall, and Xavier, Strang resigned and became a Kent State administrator and successful businessman. He was posthumously honored by the NCAA in 1997 for this contributions to college football. Kent State created the Leo Strang Award, given to the upper class football player with the highest grade point average (GPA).

== Late life and death ==
After leaving coaching, was a Kent State administrator and successful businessman. He died at the age of 73, on April 16, 1996, at the Edwin Shaw Rehabilitation Center in Akron, Ohio.

== Head coaching record ==
=== College ===
Year	Team	Overall	Conference	Standing	Bowl/playoffs
Kent State Golden Flashes (Mid-American Conference) (1964–1967)
1964	Kent State	3–5–1	1–4–1	6th	
1965	Kent State	5–4–1	3–2–1	T–3rd	
1966	Kent State	4–6	2–4	5th	
1967	Kent State	4–6	1–5	6th	
Kent State:		16–21–2	7–15–2		
Total:		16–21–2			
