= Timothy Gooch =

Timothy Gooch may refer to:

- Sir Timothy Gooch, 13th Baronet (1934–2008), British army officer and landowner
- Tim Gooch, umpire, see Indianapolis Colts draft history
