= Ellzey =

Ellzey is a surname. Notable people with the surname include:

- Jake Ellzey (born 1970), American politician
- Janet Ellzey, American combustion engineer
- Lawrence R. Ellzey (1891–1977), American politician

== See also ==
- Elzey
