= Elzey =

Elzey is a surname. Notable people with the surname include:

- Arnold Elzey (1816–1871), American soldier
- Paul Elzey (1946–1989), American football Linebacker

== See also ==
- Ellzey
