= 1965 Toledo Rockets football team =

American college football season

1965 Toledo Rockets football
- Conference: Mid-American Conference
- Record: 5–5 (2–4 MAC)
- Head coach: Frank Lauterbur (3rd season)
- Home stadium: Glass Bowl

1965 Mid-American Conference football standings
	Conf.					Overall
Team	W		L		T	W		L		T
Bowling Green +	5	–	1	–	0	7	–	2	–	0
Miami (OH) +	5	–	1	–	0	7	–	3	–	0
Western Michigan	3	–	2	–	1	6	–	2	–	1
Kent State	3	–	2	–	1	5	–	4	–	1
Marshall	2	–	4	–	0	5	–	5	–	0
Toledo	2	–	4	–	0	5	–	5	–	1
Ohio	0	–	6	–	0	0	–	10	–	0
+ – Conference co-champions

The 1965 Toledo Rockets football team was an American football team that represented Toledo University in the Mid-American Conference (MAC) during the 1965 NCAA University Division football season. In their third season under head coach Frank Lauterbur, the Rockets compiled a 5–5 record (2–4 against MAC opponents), tied for fifth place in the MAC, and outscored all opponents by a combined total of 104 to 96.

The team's statistical leaders included John Schneider with 598 passing yards, Jim Berkey with 440 rushing yards, and Henry Burch with 325 receiving yards.

== Schedule ==
Date	Opponent	Site	Result	Attendance	Source
September 18	at Villanova*	Villanova Stadium; Villanova, PA	W 9–7	8,200	
September 25	Quantico Marines*	Glass Bowl; Toledo, OH	W 9–0		
October 2	at Marshall	Fairfield Stadium; Huntington, WV	L 0–14	9,000	
October 9	Ohio	Glass Bowl; Toledo, OH	W 21–7	10,530	
October 16	at Bowling Green	University Stadium; Bowling Green, OH (rivalry)	L 14–21	14,983	
October 23	Western Michigan	Glass Bowl; Toledo, OH	L 0–3	8,100	
October 30	Kent State	Glass Bowl; Toledo, OH	W 7–3	13,500	
November 6	at Miami (OH)	Miami Field; Oxford, OH	L 16–20	14,183	
November 13	at Xavier*	Xavier Stadium; Cincinnati, OH	L 7–14	11,239	
November 20	Dayton*	Glass Bowl; Toledo, OH	W 21–7	7,480	
*Non-conference game

== After the season ==
=== NFL draft ===
The following Rocket was selected in the 1966 NFL draft following the season.

Round	Pick	Player	Position	NFL club
17	246	Lurley Archambeau	Center	Atlanta Falcons
