= 1965 Miami Redskins football team =

American college football season

1965 Miami Redskins football

MAC co-champion
- Conference: Mid-American Conference
- Record: 7–3 (5–1 MAC)
- Head coach: Bo Schembechler (3rd season)
- MVP: Jim Bright
- Captains: Jim Bright; Don Peddie; Paul Schudel
- Home stadium: Miami Field

1965 Mid-American Conference football standings
	Conf.					Overall
Team	W		L		T	W		L		T
Bowling Green +	5	–	1	–	0	7	–	2	–	0
Miami (OH) +	5	–	1	–	0	7	–	3	–	0
Western Michigan	3	–	2	–	1	6	–	2	–	1
Kent State	3	–	2	–	1	5	–	4	–	1
Marshall	2	–	4	–	0	5	–	5	–	0
Toledo	2	–	4	–	0	5	–	5	–	1
Ohio	0	–	6	–	0	0	–	10	–	0
+ – Conference co-champions

The 1965 Miami Redskins football team was an American football team that represented Miami University in the Mid-American Conference (MAC) during the 1965 NCAA University Division football season. In their third season under Bo Schembechler, Miami compiled a 7–3 record (5–1 against MAC opponents), finished in a tie with Bowling Green for the MAC championship, and outscored all opponents by a combined total of 247 to 137. After the season, Schembechler was selected as the MAC Coach of the Year.

The team's statistical leaders included quarterback Bruce Matte with 1,016 passing yards, halfback Al Moore with 677 rushing yards, and end John Erisman with 433 receiving yards.

Linebacker Jim Bright won the team's most valuable player award. Seven Miami players were selected as first-team All-MAC players: Matte, Moore, Erisman, Bright, end Gary Durchik, tackle Ed Philpott, and center Tom Stillwagon. Jim Bright, Don Peddie, and Paul Schudel were the team captains.

== Schedule ==
Date	Opponent	Site	Result	Attendance	Source
September 18	at No. 9 Purdue*	Ross–Ade Stadium; West Lafayette, IN	L 0–38	44,809	
September 25	Xavier*	Miami Field; Oxford, OH	L 28–29	12,927	
October 2	at Western Michigan	Waldo Stadium; Kalamazoo, MI	W 36–9	16,000	
October 9	at Kent State	Memorial Stadium; Kent, OH	L 13–24	15,000	
October 16	Marshall	Miami Field; Oxford, OH	W 28–7	12,567	
October 23	Ohio	Miami Field; Oxford, OH (rivalry)	W 34–0	11,136	
October 30	at Bowling Green	University Stadium; Bowling Green, OH	W 23–7	15,573	
November 6	Toledo	Miami Field; Oxford, OH	W 20–16	14,183	
November 13	at Dayton*	Baujan Field; Dayton, OH	W 28–0	12,123	
November 20	at Cincinnati*	Nippert Stadium; Cincinnati, OH (rivalry)	W 37–7	17,000	
*Non-conference game; Rankings from AP Poll released prior to the game
