= Tom Good (American football) =

American football player (born 1944)

No. 54, 64
- Position: Linebacker

Personal information
- Born: December 23, 1944 (age 81); South Charleston, West Virginia, U.S.
- Listed height: 6 ft 0 in (1.83 m)
- Listed weight: 230 lb (104 kg)

Career information
- High school: Sissonville (Sissonville, West Virginia)
- College: Marshall (1962–1965)
- NFL draft: 1965: 16th round, 211th overall pick
- AFL draft: 1965: Red Shirt 6th round, 46th overall pick

Career history
- San Diego Chargers (1966); Charleston Rockets (1967–1968)

Career AFL statistics
- Games played: 2
- Stats at Pro Football Reference

Thomas Maynard Good (born December 23, 1944) is an American former professional football player who was a linebacker for one season with the San Diego Chargers of the American Football League (AFL). He played college football for the Marshall Thundering Herd.

At Marshall, Good was a team captain on the 1965 team. In 1984, Good was inducted into the Marshall University Athletics Hall of Fame.

Good was selected by the AFL's Chargers and the NFL's New York Giants but opted to sign with the Chargers in 1966. After playing one season with the Chargers, Good played for the Charleston Rockets of the Continental Football League.
