= 1965 Ohio Bobcats football team =

American college football season

1965 Ohio Bobcats football
- Conference: Mid-American Conference
- Record: 0–10 (0–6 MAC)
- Head coach: Bill Hess (8th season)
- Home stadium: Peden Stadium

1965 Mid-American Conference football standings
	Conf.					Overall
Team	W		L		T	W		L		T
Bowling Green +	5	–	1	–	0	7	–	2	–	0
Miami (OH) +	5	–	1	–	0	7	–	3	–	0
Western Michigan	3	–	2	–	1	6	–	2	–	1
Kent State	3	–	2	–	1	5	–	4	–	1
Marshall	2	–	4	–	0	5	–	5	–	0
Toledo	2	–	4	–	0	5	–	5	–	1
Ohio	0	–	6	–	0	0	–	10	–	0
+ – Conference co-champions

The 1965 Ohio Bobcats football team was an American football team that represented Ohio University in the Mid-American Conference (MAC) during the 1965 NCAA University Division football season. In their eighth season under head coach Bill Hess, the Bobcats compiled a 0–10 record (0–6 against MAC opponents), finished in seventh place in the MAC, and were outscored by all opponents by a combined total of 210 to 77. They played their home games in Peden Stadium in Athens, Ohio.

The team's statistical leaders included Sam Bogan with 308 rushing yards, Sam Fornsaglio with 305 passing yards, and Glenn Hill with 201 receiving yards.

== Schedule ==
Date	Opponent	Site	Result	Attendance	Source
September 18	West Texas State*	Peden Stadium; Athens, OH	L 0–7	14,200	
September 25	at Maryland*	Byrd Stadium; College Park, MD	L 7–24	28,000	
October 2	Kent State	Peden Stadium; Athens, OH	L 10–27	16,100	
October 9	at Toledo	Glass Bowl; Toledo, OH	L 7–21	10,530	
October 16	Xavier*^{†}	Peden Stadium; Athens, OH	L 19–21	17,750	
October 23	at Miami (OH)	Miami Field; Oxford, OH (rivalry)	L 0–34	11,136	
October 30	at Dayton*	Baujan Field; Dayton, OH	L 7–13	9,426	
November 6	Western Michigan	Peden Stadium; Athens, OH	L 6–17	16,300	
November 13	Bowling Green	Peden Stadium; Athens, OH	L 7–17	12,000	
November 20	at Marshall	Fairfield Stadium; Huntington, WV (rivalry)	L 14–29	6,000	
*Non-conference game; ^{†}Homecoming
