= 1967 Miami Redskins football team =

American college football season

1967 Miami Redskins football
- Conference: Mid-American Conference
- Record: 6–4 (4–2 MAC)
- Head coach: Bo Schembechler (5th season)
- MVP: Bob Babich
- Captains: Jim Shaw; Bob Smith; Bob Thomas; Paul Krasula
- Home stadium: Miami Field

1967 Mid-American Conference football standings
	Conf.					Overall
Team	W		L		T	W		L		T
Toledo +	5	–	1	–	0	9	–	1	–	0
Ohio +	5	–	1	–	0	6	–	4	–	0
Miami (OH)	4	–	2	–	0	6	–	4	–	0
Western Michigan	4	–	2	–	0	5	–	4	–	0
Bowling Green	2	–	4	–	0	6	–	4	–	0
Kent State	1	–	5	–	0	4	–	6	–	0
Marshall	0	–	6	–	0	0	–	10	–	0
+ – Conference co-champions; Kent State forfeited a conference win over Ohio.

The 1967 Miami Redskins football team was an American football team that represented Miami University in the Mid-American Conference (MAC) during the 1967 NCAA University Division football season. In their fifth season under Bo Schembechler, Miami compiled a 6–4 record (4–2 against MAC opponents), finished in a tie for third place in the MAC, and outscored all opponents by a combined total of 181 to 113. Gary Moeller, Larry Smith, and Chuck Stobart all joined Schembechler's staff as assistant coaches in 1967. The team's 14–3 victory over Tulane on September 23, 1967, is regarded as one of the Miami football program's greatest victories.

The team's statistical leaders included quarterback Kent Thompson with 460 passing yards, halfback Al Moore with 717 rushing yards, and end Gary Arthur with 145 receiving yards. The team's defense allowed only 11.4 points per game, 14th best among 118 NCAA University Division football teams.

Linebacker Bob Babich won the team's most valuable player award. Six Miami players were selected as first-team All-MAC players: Babich, tight end Gary Arthur, center Paul Krasula, halfback Al Moore, safety Bob Smith, and guard Dave Tsaloff. Tsaloff, Bob Smith, Jim Shaw, qne Bob Thomas were the team captains.

== Schedule ==
Date	Opponent	Site	Result	Attendance	Source
September 16	at Western Michigan	Waldo Stadium; Kalamazoo, MI	L 14–24	22,000	
September 23	at Tulane*	Tulane Stadium; New Orleans, LA	W 14–3	31,250	
September 30	Xavier*	Miami Field; Oxford, OH	L 6–7	14,953	
October 7	at Kent State	Memorial Stadium; Kent, OH	W 21–7	14,400	
October 14	Marshall	Miami Field; Oxford, OH	W 48–6	13,418	
October 21	Ohio	Miami Field; Oxford, OH (rivalry)	W 22–15	13,994	
October 28	at Bowling Green	Doyt Perry Stadium; Bowling Green, OH	W 9–7	17,842	
November 4	Toledo	Miami Field; Oxford, OH	L 14–24	14,835	
November 11	at Dayton*	Baujan Field; Dayton, OH	L 6–7	8,760	
November 18	at Cincinnati*	Nippert Stadium; Cincinnati, OH (rivalry)	W 27–14	13,600	
*Non-conference game
