= 1965 Bowling Green Falcons football team =

American college football season

1965 Bowling Green Falcons football

MAC co-champion
- Conference: Mid-American Conference
- Record: 7–2 (5–1 MAC)
- Head coach: Bob Gibson (1st season)
- Home stadium: University Stadium

1965 Mid-American Conference football standings
	Conf.					Overall
Team	W		L		T	W		L		T
Bowling Green +	5	–	1	–	0	7	–	2	–	0
Miami (OH) +	5	–	1	–	0	7	–	3	–	0
Western Michigan	3	–	2	–	1	6	–	2	–	1
Kent State	3	–	2	–	1	5	–	4	–	1
Marshall	2	–	4	–	0	5	–	5	–	0
Toledo	2	–	4	–	0	5	–	5	–	1
Ohio	0	–	6	–	0	0	–	10	–	0
+ – Conference co-champions

The 1965 Bowling Green Falcons football team was an American football team that represented Bowling Green State University in the Mid-American Conference (MAC) during the 1965 NCAA University Division football season. In their first season under head coach Bob Gibson, the Falcons compiled a 7–2 record (5–1 against MAC opponents), tied with Miami for the MAC championship, and outscored opponents by a combined total of 123 to 107.

The team's statistical leaders included Dwight Wallace with 425 passing yards, Stew Williams with 616 rushing yards, and Dave Cranmer with 180 receiving yards.

== Schedule ==
Date	Opponent	Site	Result	Attendance	Source
September 18	Cal State Los Angeles*	University Stadium; Bowling Green, OH	W 21–0	9,474	
September 25	at West Texas State*	Buffalo Bowl; Canyon, TX	L 0–34	15,000	
October 2	at Dayton*	Baujan Field; Dayton, OH	W 9–0	12,267	
October 9	Western Michigan	University Stadium; Bowling Green, OH	W 21–17	8,610	
October 16	Toledo	University Stadium; Bowling Green, OH (rivalry)	W 21–14	14,983	
October 23	at Kent State	Memorial Stadium; Kent, OH (rivalry)	W 7–6	19,000	
October 30	Miami (OH)	University Stadium; Bowling Green, OH	L 7–23	15,573	
November 6	at Marshall	Fairfield Stadium; Huntington, WV	W 20–6	11,000	
November 13	at Ohio	Peden Stadium; Athens, OH	W 17–7	12,000	
*Non-conference game
