= 1967 Bowling Green Falcons football team =

American college football season

1967 Bowling Green Falcons football
- Conference: Mid-American Conference
- Record: 6–4 (2–4 MAC)
- Head coach: Bob Gibson (3rd season)
- Home stadium: Doyt Perry Stadium

1967 Mid-American Conference football standings
	Conf.					Overall
Team	W		L		T	W		L		T
Toledo +	5	–	1	–	0	9	–	1	–	0
Ohio +	5	–	1	–	0	6	–	4	–	0
Miami (OH)	4	–	2	–	0	6	–	4	–	0
Western Michigan	4	–	2	–	0	5	–	4	–	0
Bowling Green	2	–	4	–	0	6	–	4	–	0
Kent State	1	–	5	–	0	4	–	6	–	0
Marshall	0	–	6	–	0	0	–	10	–	0
+ – Conference co-champions; Kent State forfeited a conference win over Ohio.

The 1967 Bowling Green Falcons football team was an American football team that represented Bowling Green State University in the Mid-American Conference (MAC) during the 1967 NCAA University Division football season. In their third and final season under head coach Bob Gibson, the Falcons compiled a 6–4 record (2–4 against MAC opponents), finished in a tie for fifth place in the MAC, and outscored opponents by a combined total of 131 to 130.

The team's statistical leaders included P.J. Nyitray with 846 passing yards, Bob Zimpfer with 538 rushing yards, and Eddie Jones with 374 receiving yards.

== Schedule ==
Date	Opponent	Site	Result	Attendance	Source
September 23	Quantico Marines*	Doyt Perry Stadium; Bowling Green, OH	W 29–0	15,525	
September 30	at Dayton*	Baujan Field; Dayton, OH	W 7–0	14,300	
October 7	Western Michigan	Doyt Perry Stadium; Bowling Green, OH	L 6–10	12,972	
October 14	Toledo	Doyt Perry Stadium; Bowling Green, OH (rivalry)	L 0–33	20,547	
October 21	at Kent State	Memorial Stadium; Kent, OH (rivalry)	W 7–6	17,103	
October 28	Miami (OH)	Doyt Perry Stadium; Bowling Green, OH	L 7–9	17,842	
November 4	at Marshall	Fairfield Stadium; Huntington, WV	W 9–7	6,000	
November 11	at Ohio	Peden Stadium; Athens, OH	L 7–31	15,300	
November 18	Northern Illinois*	Doyt Perry Stadium; Bowling Green, OH	W 17–7	7,297	
November 25	at Cal State Los Angeles*	Rose Bowl; Pasadena, CA	W 42–27	2,414–2,464	
*Non-conference game
