= 1965 Marshall Thundering Herd football team =

American college football season

1965 Marshall Thundering Herd football
- Conference: Mid-American Conference
- Record: 5–5 (2–4 MAC)
- Head coach: Charlie Snyder (7th season)
- Captains: Howard Miller; Tom Good
- Home stadium: Fairfield Stadium

1965 Mid-American Conference football standings
	Conf.					Overall
Team	W		L		T	W		L		T
Bowling Green +	5	–	1	–	0	7	–	2	–	0
Miami (OH) +	5	–	1	–	0	7	–	3	–	0
Western Michigan	3	–	2	–	1	6	–	2	–	1
Kent State	3	–	2	–	1	5	–	4	–	1
Marshall	2	–	4	–	0	5	–	5	–	0
Toledo	2	–	4	–	0	5	–	5	–	1
Ohio	0	–	6	–	0	0	–	10	–	0
+ – Conference co-champions

The 1965 Marshall Thundering Herd football team was an American football team that represented Marshall University in the Mid-American Conference (MAC) during the 1965 NCAA University Division football season. In its seventh season under head coach Charlie Snyder, the team compiled a 5–5 record (2–4 against conference opponents), tied for fifth place out of seven teams in the MAC, and was outscored by a total of 168 to 151. Howard Miller and Tom Good were the team captains. The team played its home games at Fairfield Stadium in Huntington, West Virginia.

== Schedule ==
Date	Opponent	Site	Result	Attendance	Source
September 19	Morehead State*	Fairfield Stadium; Huntington, WV	W 22–12	11,000	
September 25	at Eastern Kentucky*	Hanger Stadium; Richmond, KY	W 28–12	6,800	
October 2	Toledo	Fairfield Stadium; Huntington, WV	W 14–0	9,000	
October 9	Quantico Marines*	Fairfield Stadium; Huntington, WV	W 10–9		
October 16	at Miami (OH)	Miami Field; Oxford, OH	L 7–28	12,567	
October 23	at Louisville*	Fairgrounds Stadium; Louisville, KY	L 7–23	6,800	
October 30	at Western Michigan	Waldo Stadium; Kalamazoo, MI	L 14–17	17,000	
November 6	Bowling Green^{†}	Fairfield Stadium; Huntington, WV	L 6–20	11,000	
November 13	at Kent State	Memorial Stadium; Kent, OH	L 13–33	6,500	
November 20	Ohio	Fairfield Stadium; Huntington, WV (rivalry)	W 29–14	6,000	
*Non-conference game; ^{†}Homecoming
