= Bill Doolittle =

American football player and coach (1923–2014)

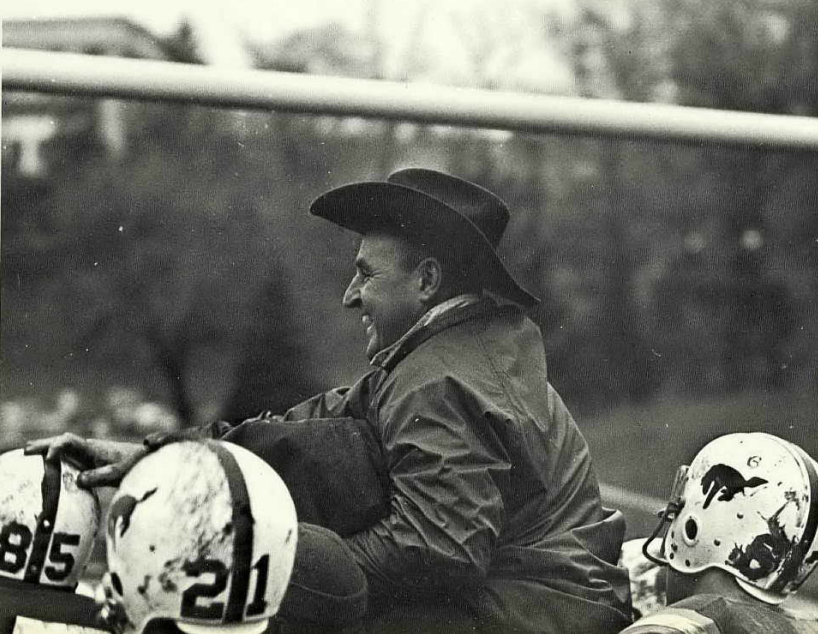
- Doolittle from The 1968 Brown and Gold

Biographical details
- Born: August 10, 1923; Mansfield, Ohio, U.S.
- Died: April 10, 2014 (aged 90); Grand Blanc, Michigan, U.S.

Playing career
- 1946–1947: Ohio State
- Position: Quarterback

Coaching career (HC unless noted)
- 1948: Grandview HS (OH)
- 1949–1950: Brown (backfield)
- 1951: Lincoln HS (OH) (assistant)
- 1952–1953: Owosso HS (MI)
- 1954–1959: Flint Central HS (MI)
- 1960–1961: Mansfield HS (OH)
- 1962–1963: Army (backfield)
- 1964–1974: Western Michigan

Head coaching record
- Overall: 58–49–2 (college)

Accomplishments and honors

Championships
- 1 MAC (1966)

Awards
- MAC Coach of the Year (1966)

Francis William Doolittle (August 10, 1923 – April 10, 2014) was an American football player and coach. Doolittle attended high school in Mansfield, Ohio, where he was selected as an all-state quarterback in his senior year. He enrolled at Ohio State University in 1941. He enlisted in the United States Marine Corps in 1943, served 53 months in the military and earned a Bronze Star for his service in the Pacific Theater before returning to Ohio State. He played college football as quarterback for the Ohio State Buckeyes football team in 1946 and 1947.

He began his coaching career in 1948 at Grandview High School in Columbus, Ohio. From 1949 to 1950, he was the backfield coach at Brown University, where he was Joe Paterno's position coach. He was an assistant football coach at Lincoln High School in Canton, Ohio, in 1951 and head coach at Owosso High School in Owosso, Michigan, in 1952–53, where his record was 6–12.

He later coached at Flint Central High School from 1954 to 1959, compiling a record of 37–14–3 at the school and leading his team to the Class A state championship in 1958. He returned to his alma mater, Mansfield High School, as the head football coach in 1960 and 1961, where his teams went 12–6–2.

In January 1962, he was hired as the offensive backfield coach for the Army football team by high school teammate Paul Dietzel.

After two years as the backfield coach for Army, he was hired as the head football coach at Western Michigan University in January 1964. After leading the team to a Mid-American Conference championship in 1966, he was named the conference's coach of the year. He spent 11 years as the head coach at Western Michigan from 1964 to 1974, compiling a record of 58–49–2 as a head coach. Doolittle resigned as the head coach at Western Michigan in November 1974.

In 1975 Doolittle became the director of Western's Gary Athletic Fund. In 1988, Doolittle received the Man of the Year Award from Western Michigan's Alumni "W" Club. He was inducted into WMU's Athletic Hall of Fame in 1996. He died at the age of 90 on April 10, 2014.

== Head coaching record ==
=== College ===
Year	Team	Overall	Conference	Standing	Bowl/playoffs
Western Michigan Broncos (Mid-American Conference) (1964–1974)
1964	Western Michigan	3–6	2–4	5th	
1965	Western Michigan	6–2–1	3–2–1	T–3rd	
1966	Western Michigan	7–3	5–1	T–1st	
1967	Western Michigan	5–4	4–2	T–3rd	
1968	Western Michigan	3–6	2–4	5th	
1969	Western Michigan	4–6	2–4	T–5th	
1970	Western Michigan	7–3	2–3	4th	
1971	Western Michigan	7–3	2–3	T–3rd	
1972	Western Michigan	7–3–1	2–2–1	3rd	
1973	Western Michigan	6–5	1–4	T–5th	
1974	Western Michigan	3–8	0–5	6th	
Western Michigan:		58–49–2	25–34–2		
Total:		58–49–2			
National championship Conference title Conference division title or championship game berth
