= 1967 Ohio Bobcats football team =

American college football season

1967 Ohio Bobcats football

MAC co-champion
- Conference: Mid-American Conference
- Record: 6–4 (5–1 MAC)
- Head coach: Bill Hess (10th season)
- Home stadium: Peden Stadium

1967 Mid-American Conference football standings
| | Conf. | | | | | Overall |
| Team | W | | L | | T | W | | L | | T |
|---|---|---|---|---|---|---|---|---|---|---|
| Toledo + | 5 | – | 1 | – | 0 | 9 | – | 1 | – | 0 |
| Ohio + | 5 | – | 1 | – | 0 | 6 | – | 4 | – | 0 |
| Miami (OH) | 4 | – | 2 | – | 0 | 6 | – | 4 | – | 0 |
| Western Michigan | 4 | – | 2 | – | 0 | 5 | – | 4 | – | 0 |
| Bowling Green | 2 | – | 4 | – | 0 | 6 | – | 4 | – | 0 |
| Kent State | 1 | – | 5 | – | 0 | 4 | – | 6 | – | 0 |
| Marshall | 0 | – | 6 | – | 0 | 0 | – | 10 | – | 0 |
+ – Conference co-champions; Kent State forfeited a conference win over Ohio.

The 1967 Ohio Bobcats football team was an American football team that represented Ohio University in the Mid-American Conference (MAC) during the 1967 NCAA University Division football season. In their tenth season under head coach Bill Hess, the Bobcats compiled an overall record of 6–4 record with a mark of 5–1 against conference opponents, sharing the MAC title with Toledo, and outscored all opponents by a combined total of 210 to 152. Kent State defeated Ohio in conference play, by a score of 21–14, on September 30, but later forfeited that victory because an ineligible player, junior end Ted Chester, had played in the game for the Golden Flashes. The team played home games at Peden Stadium in Athens, Ohio.

Ohio's statistical leaders included Dick Conley with 841 rushing yards, Cleve Bryant with 1,157 passing yards, and Todd Snyder with 629 receiving yards.

The September 30th game against Kent State marked the first performance of the "Marching 110", under the direction of Gene Thrailkill.

== Schedule ==
| Date | Opponent | Site | Result | Attendance | Source |
|---|---|---|---|---|---|
| September 16 | at Toledo | Glass Bowl; Toledo, OH | W 20–14 | 18,126 | |
| September 23 | at Marshall | Fairfield Stadium; Huntington, WV (rivalry) | W 48–14 | 8,100 | |
| September 30 | Kent State | Peden Stadium; Athens, OH | W 14–21 (forfeit win) | 18,565 | |
| October 7 | at Kansas* | Memorial Stadium; Lawrence, KS | W 30–15 | 18,000 | |
| October 14 | William & Mary* | Peden Stadium; Athens, OH | L 22–25 | 18,300 | |
| October 21 | at Miami (OH) | Miami Field; Oxford, OH (rivalry) | L 15–22 | 13,994 | |
| October 28 | at Dayton* | Baujan Field; Dayton, OH | L 9–10 | 10,800 | |
| November 4 | Western Michigan | Peden Stadium; Athens, OH | W 20–10 | 18,103 | |
| November 11 | Bowling Green | Peden Stadium; Athens, OH | W 31–7 | 15,300 | |
| November 18 | at Penn State* | Beaver Stadium; University Park, PA | L 14–35 | 23,000 | |
*Non-conference game
