= 1967 Western Michigan Broncos football team =

American college football season

1967 Western Michigan Broncos football
- Conference: Mid-American Conference
- Record: 5–4 (4–2 MAC)
- Head coach: Bill Doolittle (4th season)
- MVP: Marty Barski
- Captains: Bill Devine; Orv Schneider
- Home stadium: Waldo Stadium

1967 Mid-American Conference football standings
	Conf.					Overall
Team	W		L		T	W		L		T
Toledo +	5	–	1	–	0	9	–	1	–	0
Ohio +	5	–	1	–	0	6	–	4	–	0
Miami (OH)	4	–	2	–	0	6	–	4	–	0
Western Michigan	4	–	2	–	0	5	–	4	–	0
Bowling Green	2	–	4	–	0	6	–	4	–	0
Kent State	1	–	5	–	0	4	–	6	–	0
Marshall	0	–	6	–	0	0	–	10	–	0
+ – Conference co-champions; Kent State forfeited a conference win over Ohio.

The 1967 Western Michigan Broncos football team represented Western Michigan University in the Mid-American Conference (MAC) during the 1967 NCAA University Division football season. In their fourth season under head coach Bill Doolittle, the Broncos compiled a 5–4 record (4–2 against MAC opponents), finished in a tie for third place in the MAC, and were outscored by their opponents, 164 to 156. The team played its home games at Waldo Stadium in Kalamazoo, Michigan.

The team's statistical leaders included Jim Boreland with 1,113 passing yards, Jack Foster with 497 rushing yards, and Marty Barski with 653 receiving yards. Halfback Bill Devine and linebacker Orv Schneider were the team captains. Split Marty Barski received the team's most outstanding player award.

== Schedule ==
Date	Opponent	Site	Result	Attendance	Source
September 16	Miami (OH)	Waldo Stadium; Kalamazoo, MI	W 24–14	22,000	
September 23	at No. 5 Arkansas State*	Kays Stadium; Jonesboro, AR	L 8–21	7,950–7,953	
September 29	at BYU*	Cougar Stadium; Provo, UT	L 19–44	20,672	
October 7	at Bowling Green	Doyt Perry Stadium; Bowling Green, OH	W 10–6	12,972	
October 14	Kent State	Waldo Stadium; Kalamazoo, MI	W 16–7	22,800	
October 21	at Toledo	Glass Bowl; Toledo, OH	L 9–35	17,123	
October 28	Marshall	Waldo Stadium; Kalamazoo, MI	W 42–10	17,500	
November 4	at Ohio	Peden Stadium; Athens, OH	L 10–20	18,103	
November 11	Xavier*	Waldo Stadium; Kalamazoo, MI	W 18–7	9,000	
*Non-conference game; Rankings from AP Poll released prior to the game
