= 1965 Kent State Golden Flashes football team =

American college football season

1965 Kent State Golden Flashes football
- Conference: Mid-American Conference
- Record: 5–4–1 (3–2–1 MAC)
- Head coach: Leo Strang (2nd season)
- Home stadium: Memorial Stadium

1965 Mid-American Conference football standings
	Conf.					Overall
Team	W		L		T	W		L		T
Bowling Green +	5	–	1	–	0	7	–	2	–	0
Miami (OH) +	5	–	1	–	0	7	–	3	–	0
Western Michigan	3	–	2	–	1	6	–	2	–	1
Kent State	3	–	2	–	1	5	–	4	–	1
Marshall	2	–	4	–	0	5	–	5	–	0
Toledo	2	–	4	–	0	5	–	5	–	1
Ohio	0	–	6	–	0	0	–	10	–	0
+ – Conference co-champions

The 1965 Kent State Golden Flashes football team was an American football team that represented Kent State University in the Mid-American Conference (MAC) during the 1965 NCAA University Division football season. In their second season under head coach Leo Strang, the Golden Flashes compiled a 5–4–1 record (3–2–1 against MAC opponents), finished in a tie for third place in the MAC, and outscored all opponents by a combined total of 144 to 114. The season marked Kent's first winning season in a half-decade, its first as a major college program, and its longest unbeaten streak since 1956 that was not surpassed until 1973.

The team's statistical leaders included Willie Asbury with 998 rushing yards, Ron Mollric with 407 passing yards, and Billy Blunt with 337 receiving yards. Four Kent State players were selected as first-team All-MAC players: halfback Willie Asbury, offensive tackle Jon Brooks, defensive back Pat Gucciardo, and offensive guard Ed Musbach. Asbury, who went on to play for the Pittsburgh Steelers, was the MAC Offensive Player of the Year.

== Schedule ==
Date	Opponent	Site	Result	Attendance	Source
September 18	at Xavier*	Xavier Stadium; Cincinnati, OH	L 14–21	12,235	
September 25	Dayton*	Memorial Stadium; Kent, OH	W 14–6	13,500	
October 2	at Ohio	Peden Stadium; Athens, OH	W 27–10	16,100	
October 9	Miami (OH)	Memorial Stadium; Kent, OH	W 24–13	15,000	
October 16	at Western Michigan	Waldo Stadium; Kalamazoo, MI	T 10–10	17,500	
October 23	Bowling Green	Memorial Stadium; Kent, OH (rivalry)	L 6–7	19,000	
October 30	at Toledo	Glass Bowl; Toledo, OH	L 3–7	13,500	
November 6	at Penn State*	Beaver Stadium; University Park, PA	L 6–21	30,300	
November 13	Marshall	Memorial Stadium; Kent, OH	W 33–13	6,500	
November 20	Louisville*	Memorial Stadium; Kent, OH	W 7–6	5,500	
*Non-conference game
