= 1967 Kent State Golden Flashes football team =

American college football season

1967 Kent State Golden Flashes football
- Conference: Mid-American Conference
- Record: 4–6 (1–5 MAC)
- Head coach: Leo Strang (4th season)
- Home stadium: Memorial Stadium

1967 Mid-American Conference football standings
	Conf.					Overall
Team	W		L		T	W		L		T
Toledo +	5	–	1	–	0	9	–	1	–	0
Ohio +	5	–	1	–	0	6	–	4	–	0
Miami (OH)	4	–	2	–	0	6	–	4	–	0
Western Michigan	4	–	2	–	0	5	–	4	–	0
Bowling Green	2	–	4	–	0	6	–	4	–	0
Kent State	1	–	5	–	0	4	–	6	–	0
Marshall	0	–	6	–	0	0	–	10	–	0
+ – Conference co-champions; Kent State forfeited a conference win over Ohio.

The 1967 Kent State Golden Flashes football team was an American football team that represented Kent State University in the Mid-American Conference (MAC) during the 1967 NCAA University Division football season. In their fourth season under head coach Leo Strang, the Golden Flashes compiled an overall record of 4–6 with a mark of 1–5 against conference opponents, finished in sixth place in the MAC, and outscored all opponents by a combined total of 195 to 144. Kent State defeated Ohio in conference play, by a score of 21–14, on September 30, but later forfeited that victory because an ineligible player, junior end Ted Chester, had played in the game for the Golden Flashes. Chester has also played the previous week, in 35–0 victory over Northern Illinois, but the Huskies refused to accept a forfeit.

The team's statistical leaders included Don Fitzgerald with 891 rushing yards, Ron Swartz with 1,029 passing yards, and Will Perry with 601 receiving yards. Three Kent State players were selected as first-team All-MAC players: defensive tackle Jim Corrigall, halfback Don Fitzgerald, and defensive back Lou Harris.

Strang resigned as Kent State's head football coach on November 21, 1967 after closing out the season with successive wins over Louisville, Marshall, and Xavier. He compiled a 16–21–2 record in four seasons as Kent State's head coach, a .436 win-loss percentage. Only one other Kent coach, with an equal or longer tenure, has posted a better win-loss percentage than Leo Strang since 1967.

== Schedule ==
Date	Opponent	Site	Result	Attendance	Source
September 16	at Buffalo*	Rotary Field; Buffalo, NY	L 6–30	11,019	
September 23	Northern Illinois*	Memorial Stadium; Kent, OH	W 35–0	14,100	
September 30	at Ohio	Peden Stadium; Athens, OH	L 21–14 (forfeit)	18,565	
October 7	Miami (OH)	Memorial Stadium; Kent, OH	L 7–21	14,400	
October 14	at Western Michigan	Waldo Stadium; Kalamazoo, MI	L 7–16	22,800	
October 21	Bowling Green	Memorial Stadium; Kent, OH (rivalry)	L 6–7	17,103	
October 28	at Toledo	Glass Bowl; Toledo, OH	L 13–14	16,105	
November 4	Louisville*	Memorial Stadium; Kent, OH	W 28–21	11,500	
November 11	Marshall	Memorial Stadium; Kent, OH	W 41–2	4,303	
November 18	at Xavier*	Xavier Stadium; Cincinnati, OH	W 31–19	8,294	
*Non-conference game
