= 1965 Western Michigan Broncos football team =

American college football season

1965 Western Michigan Broncos football
- Conference: Mid-American Conference
- Record: 6–2–1 (3–2–1 MAC)
- Head coach: Bill Doolittle (2nd season)
- MVP: Bob Rowe
- Captains: Jim Reid; Nelson Jackson
- Home stadium: Waldo Stadium

1965 Mid-American Conference football standings
	Conf.					Overall
Team	W		L		T	W		L		T
Bowling Green +	5	–	1	–	0	7	–	2	–	0
Miami (OH) +	5	–	1	–	0	7	–	3	–	0
Western Michigan	3	–	2	–	1	6	–	2	–	1
Kent State	3	–	2	–	1	5	–	4	–	1
Marshall	2	–	4	–	0	5	–	5	–	0
Toledo	2	–	4	–	0	5	–	5	–	1
Ohio	0	–	6	–	0	0	–	10	–	0
+ – Conference co-champions

The 1965 Western Michigan Broncos football team was an American football team that represented Western Michigan University during the 1965 NCAA University Division football season. In their second season under head coach Bill Doolittle, the Broncos compiled a 6–2–1 record and finished in third place in the Mid-American Conference (MAC).

The team's statistical leaders were Ron Seifert with 698 passing yards, Steve Terlep with 362 rushing yards, and Dave Mollard with 25 catches for 276 receiving yards. Center Jim Reid and guard Nelson Jackson were the team captains. Offensive tackle Bob Rowe received the team's most outstanding player award.

== Schedule ==
Date	Opponent	Site	Result	Attendance	Source
September 18	Louisville*	Waldo Stadium; Kalamazoo, MI	W 17–13	13,500	
September 25	at Central Michigan	Alumni Field; Mount Pleasant, MI (rivalry)	W 21–13	7,500	
October 2	Miami (OH)	Waldo Stadium; Kalamazoo, MI	L 9–36	16,000	
October 9	at Bowling Green	University Stadium; Bowling Green, OH	L 17–21	8,610	
October 16	Kent State	Waldo Stadium; Kalamazoo, MI	T 10–10	17,500	
October 23	at Toledo	Glass Bowl; Toledo, OH	W 3–0	8,100	
October 30	Marshall	Waldo Stadium; Kalamazoo, MI	W 17–14	17,000	
November 6	at Ohio	Peden Stadium; Athens, OH	W 17–6	16,300	
November 13	Montana*	Waldo Stadium; Kalamazoo, MI	W 17–14	9,000	
*Non-conference game
