= Janet Ellzey =

American combustion engineer

Janet L. Ellzey is an American mechanical engineer specializing in combustion, especially involving burners made of porous media. She is a professor in the J. Mike Walker Department of Mechanical Engineering at the University of Texas at Austin, where she holds an Engineering Foundation Centennial Teaching Fellowship in Engineering.

== Education and career ==
Ellzey majored in mechanical engineering at the University of Texas at Austin, graduating in 1978 and continuing on for a master's degree in 1980. She earned a Ph.D. in mechanical engineering at the University of California, Berkeley in 1985.

After working as a staff scientist at the Naval Research Laboratory, she returned to the University of Texas at Austin as a faculty member in 1990. There, she was an associate dean from 2007 to 2009, and vice provost for international programs from 2009 to 2017.

She was a founder of the university's Projects with Underserved Communities program, which aims to develop engineering projects to help communities in developing nations. In 2021–2022 she won a Jefferson Science Fellowship from the National Academies of Science and Engineering, funding her to work as Senior Science Advisor in the Local, Faith, and Transformative Partnerships Hub of the United States Agency for International Development (USAID) Bureau of Development, Democracy, and Innovation.

== Recognition ==
The University of Texas at Austin Department of Mechanical Engineering named Ellzey as a distinguished alumni member in 2011. She was elected to the inaugural 2018 class of Fellows of The Combustion Institute, "for excellent research in reacting and inert porous media".
