= Roland Moss =

American football player (born 1946)

No. 44, 38, 40, 86
- Position: Tight end

Personal information
- Born: September 20, 1946 (age 80); St. Matthews, South Carolina, U.S.
- Listed height: 6 ft 3 in (1.91 m)
- Listed weight: 215 lb (98 kg)

Career information
- High school: Passaic (Passaic, New Jersey)
- College: Toledo
- NFL draft: 1969: 7th round, 181st overall pick

Career history
- Baltimore Colts (1969); San Diego Chargers (1970); Buffalo Bills (1970); New England Patriots (1971)

Career NFL statistics
- Receptions: 11
- Receiving yards: 155
- Touchdowns: 1
- Stats at Pro Football Reference

Roland Moss Jr. (born September 20, 1946) is an American former professional football player who was a tight end for three seasons in the National Football League (NFL). He played college football for the Toledo Rockets.

Born in St. Matthews, South Carolina and raised in Passaic, New Jersey, Moss attended Passaic High School.

== See also ==
- List of Toledo Rockets in the NFL draft
