= 1967 Marshall Thundering Herd football team =

American college football season

1967 Marshall Thundering Herd football
- Conference: Mid-American Conference
- Record: 0–10 (0–6 MAC)
- Head coach: Charlie Snyder (9th season)
- Captains: Tim McLaughlin; Richie Robb
- Home stadium: Fairfield Stadium

1967 Mid-American Conference football standings
| | Conf. | | | | | Overall |
| Team | W | | L | | T | W | | L | | T |
|---|---|---|---|---|---|---|---|---|---|---|
| Toledo + | 5 | – | 1 | – | 0 | 9 | – | 1 | – | 0 |
| Ohio + | 5 | – | 1 | – | 0 | 6 | – | 4 | – | 0 |
| Miami (OH) | 4 | – | 2 | – | 0 | 6 | – | 4 | – | 0 |
| Western Michigan | 4 | – | 2 | – | 0 | 5 | – | 4 | – | 0 |
| Bowling Green | 2 | – | 4 | – | 0 | 6 | – | 4 | – | 0 |
| Kent State | 1 | – | 5 | – | 0 | 4 | – | 6 | – | 0 |
| Marshall | 0 | – | 6 | – | 0 | 0 | – | 10 | – | 0 |
+ – Conference co-champions; Kent State forfeited a conference win over Ohio.

The 1967 Marshall Thundering Herd football team was an American football team that represented Marshall University in the Mid-American Conference (MAC) during the 1967 NCAA University Division football season. In its ninth and final season under head coach Charlie Snyder, the team compiled a 0–10 record (0–6 against conference opponents), finished in seventh place out of seven teams in the MAC, and was outscored by a total of 311 to 72. Tim McLaughlin and Richie Robb were the team captains. The team played its home games at Fairfield Stadium in Huntington, West Virginia.

== Schedule ==
| Date | Opponent | Site | Result | Attendance | Source |
|---|---|---|---|---|---|
| September 16 | at Morehead State* | Jayne Stadium; Morehead, KY | L 6–30 | 10,100 | |
| September 23 | Ohio | Fairfield Stadium; Huntington, WV (rivalry) | L 14–48 | 8,100 | |
| September 30 | Toledo | Fairfield Stadium; Huntington, WV | L 7–14 | 5,300 | |
| October 7 | Xavier* | Fairfield Stadium; Huntington, WV | L 0–7 | 5,800 | |
| October 14 | at Miami (OH) | Miami Field; Oxford, OH | L 6–48 | 13,418 | |
| October 21 | at Louisville* | Fairgrounds Stadium; Louisville, KY | L 7–43 | 12,507 | |
| October 28 | at Western Michigan | Waldo Stadium; Kalamazoo, MI | L 10–42 | 17,500 | |
| November 4 | Bowling Green^{†} | Fairfield Stadium; Huntington, WV | L 2–41 | 6,000 | |
| November 11 | at Kent State | Memorial Stadium; Kent, OH | L 13–29 | 4,303 | |
| November 18 | East Carolina* | Fairfield Stadium; Huntington, WV (rivalry) | L 13–29 | 4,500 | |
*Non-conference game; ^{†}Homecoming
