= Jerry Welch =

American politician

Member of the U.S. House of Representatives from Missouri's 54th district

Missouri House of Representatives
- Incumbent
- Assumed office 1975

Personal details
- Born: 1944 Ironton, Missouri
- Died: 2023 (aged 78–79) near Billings, Montana
- Party: Democratic
- Spouse(s): Susan Wehmer; Carrie
- Children: 4 (1 son, 3 daughters)

Jerry F. Welch (October 23, 1944 – October 2, 2023) was a Democratic politician who served in the Missouri House of Representatives. He was born in Ironton, Missouri, and was educated at Castro Valley High School in Castro Valley, California; at Valley of Caledonia High School in Caledonia, Missouri; and at University of Missouri–St. Louis. He married Susan Wehmer in St. Louis, Missouri.
