= John Schneider (Canadian football) =

American gridiron football player (born 1945)

Profile
- Position: Quarterback

Personal information
- Born: February 1, 1945 (age 81)
- Listed height: 6 ft 1 in (1.85 m)
- Listed weight: 175 lb (79 kg)

Career information
- College: Toledo

Career history
- 1968–1969: Winnipeg Blue Bombers

John Schneider (born January 1, 1945) was an American professional football player who played for the Winnipeg Blue Bombers. He played college football at the University of Toledo and is a member of their athletic hall of fame (inducted 1982).
