= Paul Elzey =

American football player (1946–1989)

No. 65, 52
- Position: Linebacker

Personal information
- Born: May 13, 1946; Toledo, Ohio, U.S.
- Died: September 29, 1989 (aged 43); Toledo, Ohio, U.S.
- Listed height: 6 ft 3 in (1.91 m)
- Listed weight: 235 lb (107 kg)

Career information
- High school: St. Francis de Sales (Toledo)
- College: Toledo (1964-1967)
- NFL draft: 1968: 5th round, 126th overall pick

Career history
- Harrisburg Capitol Colts (1968); Cincinnati Bengals (1968)

Career AFL statistics
- Fumble recoveries: 1
- Stats at Pro Football Reference

Paul Vincent Elzey (May 13, 1946 – September 29, 1989) was an American professional football linebacker who played one season for the Cincinnati Bengals of the National Football League (NFL). He was selected by the Baltimore Colts in the fifth round of the 1968 NFL/AFL draft.
