= 2018 World Series =

114th edition of Major League Baseball's championship series

Team (Wins)	Managers	Season
Boston Red Sox (4)	Alex Cora	108–54 (.667), GA: 8
Los Angeles Dodgers (1)	Dave Roberts	92–71 (.564), GA: 1
- Dates: October 23–28
- Venue(s): Fenway Park (Boston); Dodger Stadium (Los Angeles)
- MVP: Steve Pearce (Boston)
- Umpires: Ted Barrett (crew chief), Fieldin Culbreth (Games 3–5), Kerwin Danley, Chad Fairchild, Jeff Nelson, Jim Reynolds, Tim Timmons (Games 1–2)

Broadcast
- Television: Fox (United States – English); Fox Deportes (United States – Spanish); MLB International (International - English)
- TV announcers: Joe Buck, John Smoltz, Ken Rosenthal and Tom Verducci (Fox); Rolando Nichols, Carlos Álvarez and Edgar Gonzalez (Fox Deportes); Matt Vasgersian and Buck Martinez (MLB International)
- Radio: ESPN (English); ESPN Deportes (Spanish); WEEI-FM (BOS – English); WCCM (BOS – Spanish); KLAC (LAD – English); KTNQ (LAD – Spanish); KMPC (LAD – Korean)
- Radio announcers: Dan Shulman (Games 1–4), Jon Sciambi (Game 5), Chris Singleton and Buster Olney (ESPN); Eduardo Ortega and Orlando Hernández (ESPN Deportes); Joe Castiglione, Tim Neverett and Lou Merloni (WEEI); Uri Berenguer (WCCM); Charley Steiner and Rick Monday (KLAC); Jaime Jarrín and Jorge Jarrín (KTNQ); Richard Choi and Chong Ho Yim (KMPC)
- ALCS: Boston Red Sox over Houston Astros (4–1)
- NLCS: Los Angeles Dodgers over Milwaukee Brewers (4–3)

The 2018 World Series was the championship series of Major League Baseball's 2018 season. The 114th edition of the World Series, it was a best-of-seven playoff played between the American League (AL) champion Boston Red Sox and the National League (NL) champion Los Angeles Dodgers. The Red Sox defeated the Dodgers in five games to win their fourth World Series title in 15 years dating back to 2004, and their ninth in franchise history. This was the second World Series matchup between the two franchises, after the Red Sox defeated the Brooklyn Robins (later known as the Dodgers) in five games in 1916. The series was sponsored by the Internet television service YouTube TV and officially known as the 2018 World Series presented by YouTube TV.

The Series was televised in the United States on Fox. Steve Pearce won the World Series Most Valuable Player Award, while Alex Cora became the fifth first-season manager and first manager from Puerto Rico to win the World Series. The Series, as well as the 2025 World Series, were both notable for their third games that lasted 18 innings, a World Series record.

== Background ==
The Boston Red Sox' most recent World Series appearance was their 2013 win over the St. Louis Cardinals. The Los Angeles Dodgers, who last won a World Series in 1988 over the Oakland Athletics, made their second consecutive appearance, after losing to the Houston Astros in 2017. The two franchises faced each other in the 1916 World Series; the Red Sox won the series in five games against the then-Brooklyn Robins. With a distance of 2,593 miles between Dodger Stadium and Fenway Park, this is the furthest distance between the home stadiums of two World Series teams, a record only breakable if the San Francisco Giants play the Red Sox (2,696 miles between Oracle Park and Fenway Park) or the Miami Marlins play the Seattle Mariners (2,732 miles between LoanDepot Park and T-Mobile Park). The 2018 World Series was the first since 2000 to feature two teams which had also reached the postseason in the prior year.

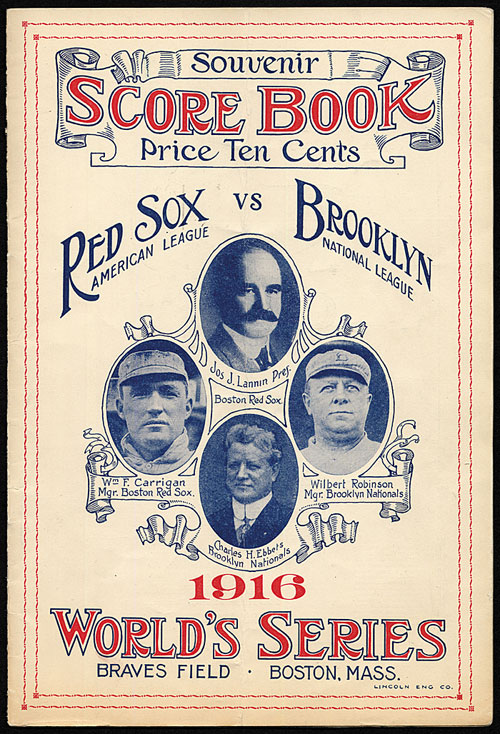
A scorebook from the 1916 World Series

Red Sox manager Alex Cora and Dodgers manager Dave Roberts were teammates on the Dodgers in 2002, 2003, and 2004. Although they did not play together on the Red Sox, both managers played and won a World Series championship with Boston—Roberts in 2004 and Cora in 2007. This was the first World Series with two managers of color; additionally, both managers were born outside the contiguous United States, as Cora was born in Puerto Rico and Roberts in Japan.

While this was a rare match-up, with the Dodgers-Red Sox having only met 20 times ever, the Dodgers trade deadline acquisition Manny Machado had a long history with the Red Sox. In a game in April 2017, Machado, then with the Baltimore Orioles, aggressively slid over the second base bag and spiked Dustin Pedroia in the knee. Pedroia missed 56 of the remaining 145 games, twice going on the injured list. The Red Sox responded by throwing at Machado throughout the 2017 season, feeling that the slide was a dirty play. Setbacks to his recovery left Pedroia out of the lineup for all but 11 at-bats during the 2018 season. Before the World Series, Pedroia told WEEI's Rob Bradford about the slide. "I think about it all the time." And when Bradford asked if there has been any contact with Machado since then, Pedroia had a terse response, "no." In the 2018 World Series, Machado was booed heavily at Fenway Park. By the time of his retirement in 2021, Pedroia said he had forgiven Machado and he was "at peace with the play."

This was the twelfth meeting between teams from Boston and Los Angeles for a major professional sports championship. This previously occurred in eleven NBA Finals during the peak of the rivalry between both cities' NBA teams in the Lakers and Celtics.

=== Boston Red Sox ===
The Red Sox finished with a 108–54 (.667) record, winning the American League East division title for the third consecutive season, eight games ahead of the second-place New York Yankees, and were the first team to clinch a berth in the 2018 postseason. The Red Sox surpassed the 100-win mark for the first time since 1946, broke the franchise record of 105 wins that had been set in 1912, and won the most games of any MLB team since the 2001 Seattle Mariners won 116. The 2018 Red Sox were highlighted by All-Stars Mookie Betts, Craig Kimbrel, J. D. Martinez, and Chris Sale. Betts led baseball in batting average and slugging percentage, while Martinez led in runs batted in. Sale tossed only 158 innings due to a shoulder injury late in the year, but was otherwise superb, posting a 2.11 earned run average to go along with 237 strikeouts. Kimbrel saved 42 games and struck out 96 batters in 62.1 innings.

The Red Sox entered the 2018 postseason as the overall number one seed, and defeated their archrival in the fourth-seeded New York Yankees in four games in the Division Series, and handed the Yankees their worst postseason loss ever in Game 3 — a 16–1 rout. Next, they defeated the defending World Series champions - the second-seeded Houston Astros in five games in the League Championship Series. Including their 2004 win that ended the Curse of the Bambino, this was the fourth World Series appearance by the Red Sox in 15 years and their 13th appearance all-time.

=== Los Angeles Dodgers ===
Despite a 16–26 (.381) start to the season and nine losses in an 11-game stretch in mid-August, the Dodgers made the playoffs for the sixth straight year by winning the division in a one-game tiebreaker over the Rockies. At the July trade deadline, the team traded for All-Star shortstop Manny Machado from the Orioles to replace injured shortstop Corey Seager and a former All-Star second baseman Brian Dozier from the Twins. In August, the Dodgers acquired former World Series MVP David Freese from the Pirates. For the second year in a row, the Dodgers broke their franchise record for most team home runs in a season. With a 92–71 (.564) record, the team entered the playoffs as the National League's second seed and went on to beat the third-seeded Atlanta Braves in four games in the 2018 National League Division Series and the top-seeded Milwaukee Brewers in seven games in the 2018 National League Championship Series, becoming the first team in either league to win Game 7 of a League Championship Series on the road since the 2006 Cardinals.

The 2018 Dodgers were the first team to make the World Series by winning their tie-breaker game since the 2007 Colorado Rockies, who also faced and lost to Boston in that World Series. This was the Dodgers' fifth back-to-back World Series appearance (Two came in Brooklyn in 1952–1953 and 1955–1956, and two came in Los Angeles in 1965–1966 and 1977–1978), and the first time since the 2014-15 Kansas City Royals to win back-to-back League Championship Series. Overall, this was the Dodgers' 20th World Series appearance.

== Summary ==
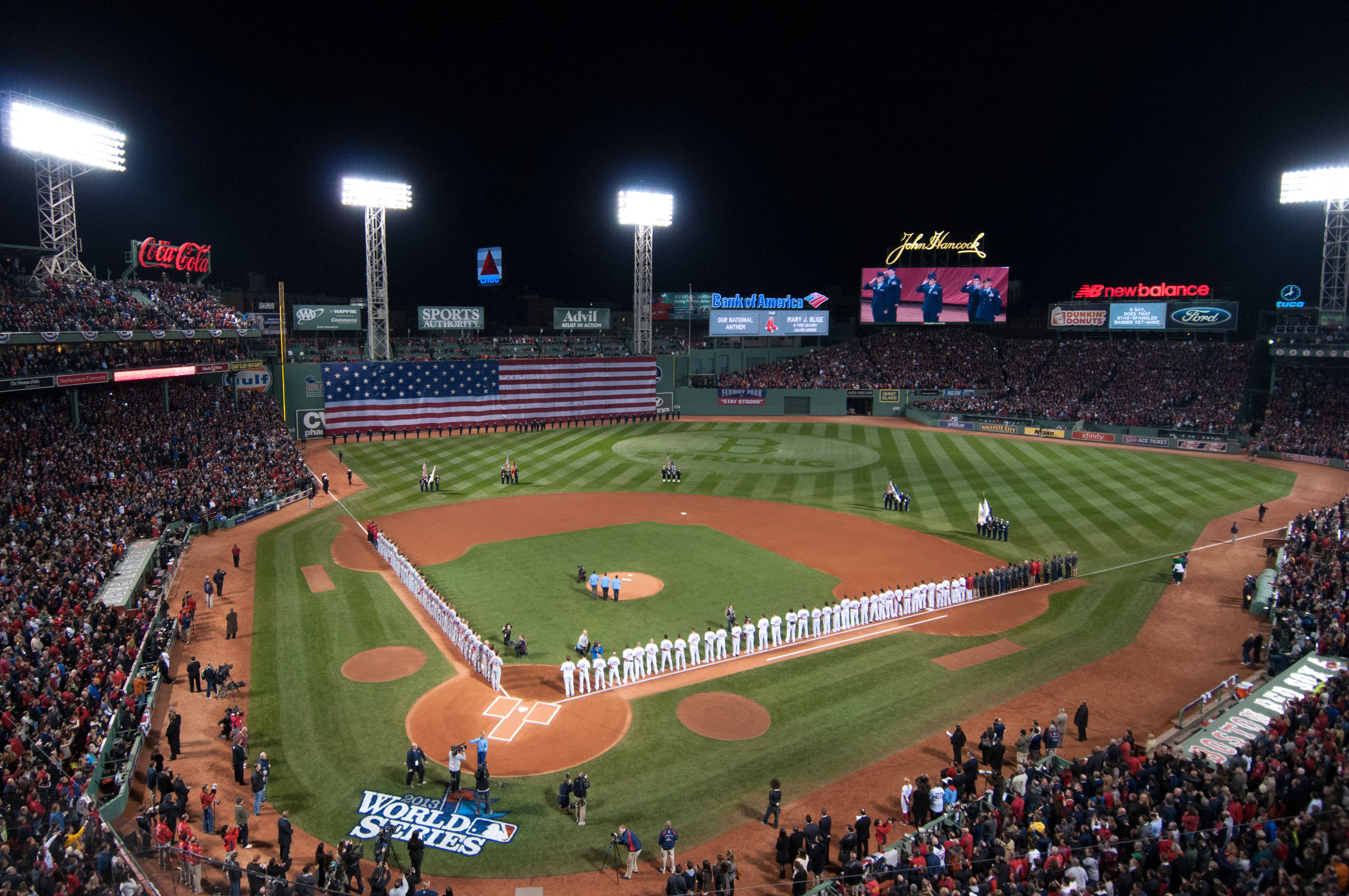
Fenway Park

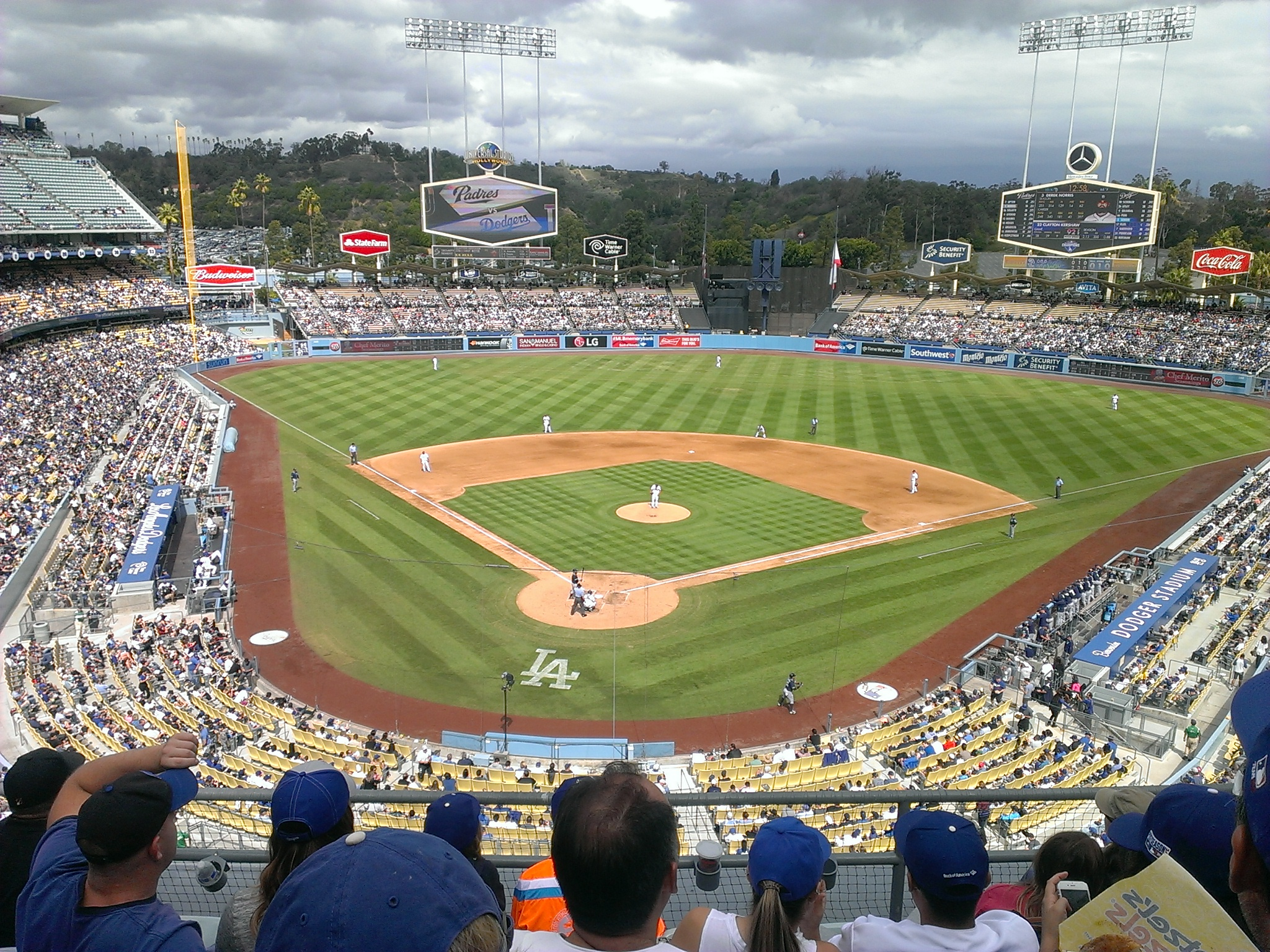
Dodger Stadium

Boston won the series, 4–1.

Game	Date	Score	Location	Time	Attendance
1	October 23	Los Angeles Dodgers – 4, Boston Red Sox – 8	Fenway Park	3:52	38,454
2	October 24	Los Angeles Dodgers – 2, Boston Red Sox – 4	Fenway Park	3:12	38,644
3	October 26	Boston Red Sox – 2, Los Angeles Dodgers – 3 (18)	Dodger Stadium	7:20	53,114
4	October 27	Boston Red Sox − 9, Los Angeles Dodgers − 6	Dodger Stadium	3:57	54,400
5	October 28	Boston Red Sox – 5, Los Angeles Dodgers – 1	Dodger Stadium	3:00	54,367

== Pre-game ceremonies ==
- Game 1: The national anthem was performed by James Taylor. Boston Hall of Famer Carl Yastrzemski threw the ceremonial first pitch, as he did before Game 1 in 2004, 2007, and 2013. The game ball was delivered by a member of the Boys & Girls Clubs of Boston, accompanied by Hall of Famer Jim Rice.
- Game 2: The national anthem was performed by the Boston Pops along with vocalists from the Boston Children's Chorus and the Tanglewood Festival Chorus. The ceremonial first pitch was thrown by members of the 2004 Red Sox championship team, including David Ortiz and Hall of Famer Pedro Martínez. While declining to throw a first pitch, Dodgers' manager Dave Roberts, who played on that championship team, greeted teammates from his former team. The game ball was delivered by a member of the Boys & Girls Clubs of Boston, accompanied by NESN announcer and former Red Sox All-Star second baseman Jerry Remy.
- Game 3: The national anthem was performed by Brad Paisley. The ceremonial first pitch was thrown by Hall of Famer and former Dodger player, coach and manager Tommy Lasorda, who was accompanied on the field by one of the team's owners, Magic Johnson; the pitch was caught by former Dodger All-Star Steve Garvey. The game ball was delivered by a member of the Boys & Girls Clubs of West San Gabriel, accompanied by actor Mario Lopez.
- Game 4: A moment of silence was held to honor victims of the Pittsburgh synagogue shooting, which had happened that morning. The national anthem was performed by OneRepublic lead singer Ryan Tedder. The ceremonial first pitch was thrown by Hall of Famer Dennis Eckersley and former Red Sox player to former Dodger Kirk Gibson, recalling Gibson's game-winning home run off Eckersley in Game 1 of the 1988 World Series. The game ball was delivered by a member of the Boys & Girls Clubs of America, accompanied by actor Anthony Anderson.
- Game 5: The national anthem was performed by Petty Officer Second Class Mike Dalager of the United States Coast Guard. The ceremonial first pitch was thrown by former Dodger All-Star Orel Hershiser to former Dodger Mickey Hatcher. The game ball was delivered by a member of the Boys & Girls Clubs of America, accompanied by actor J. B. Smoove.

== Matchups ==
=== Game 1 ===
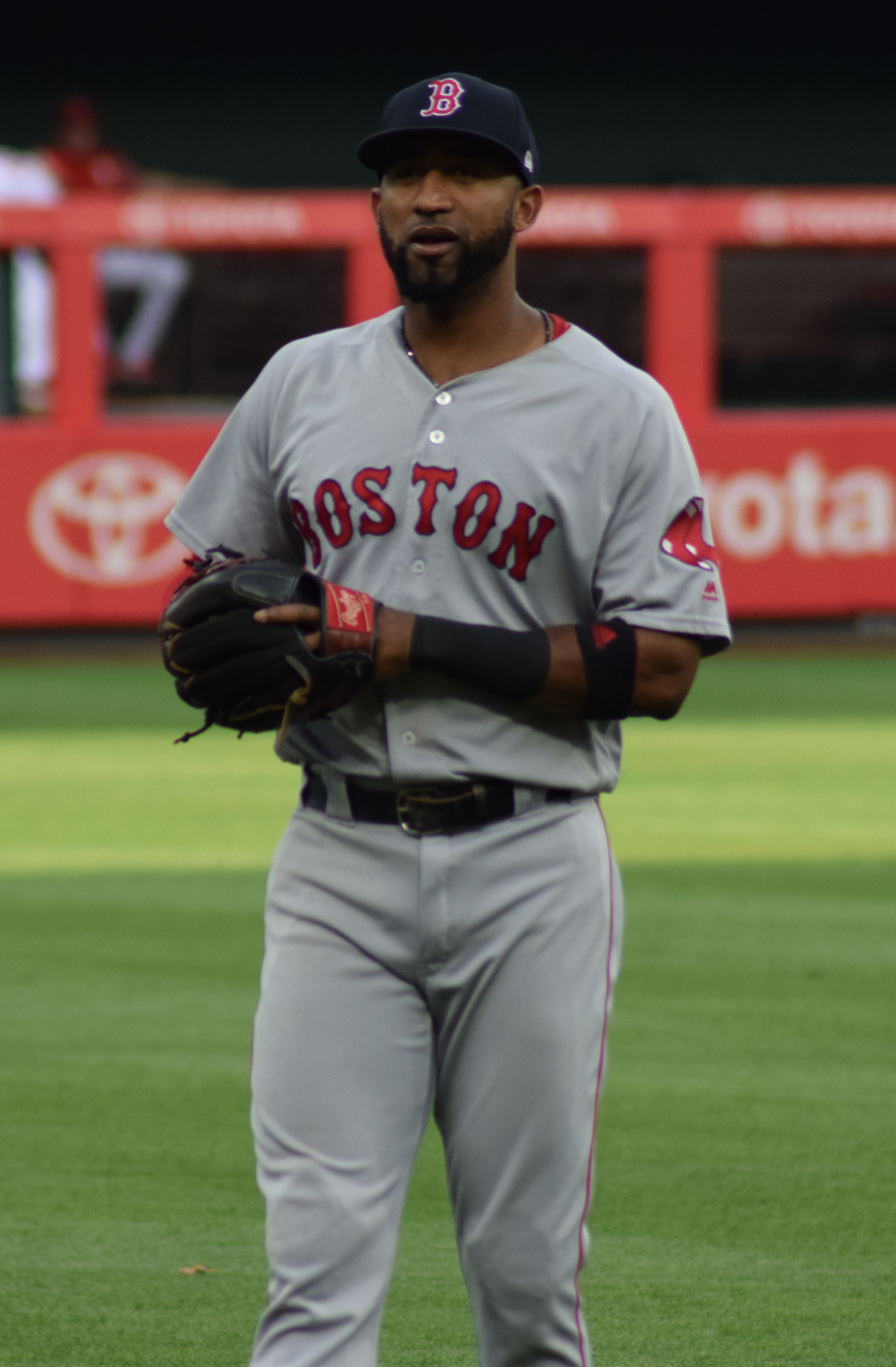
Eduardo Núñez hit a three-run home run for Boston in the seventh inning.

October 23, 2018, 8:11 pm (EDT) at Fenway Park in Boston, Massachusetts, 53 °F (12 °C), clear
Team	1	2	3	4	5	6	7	8	9	R	H	E
Los Angeles	0	1	1	0	1	0	1	0	0	4	8	0
Boston	2	0	1	0	2	0	3	0	X	8	11	0
WP: Matt Barnes (1–0) LP: Clayton Kershaw (0–1); Home runs: LAD: Matt Kemp (1); BOS: Eduardo Núñez (1); Attendance: 38,454; Boxscore

The Red Sox started Chris Sale against the Dodgers' Clayton Kershaw. Kershaw became the first pitcher to start the first game of the World Series in back-to-back years since Cliff Lee did so in 2009 (for the Phillies) and 2010 (for the Rangers) and the first to do so for the same team since Dave Stewart pitched three consecutive Game 1s for the Oakland Athletics from 1988 to 1990. The Red Sox struck in the first inning when Mookie Betts singled, stole second and then scored on a hit by Andrew Benintendi, who subsequently scored on a single by J. D. Martinez. Boston benefited from Dodgers' first baseman David Freese missing a foul pop-up by Betts, and right fielder Yasiel Puig allowing Benintendi to advance to second base on a late throw to the plate. A homer by Matt Kemp in the second inning gave the Dodgers a run, and an RBI single by Manny Machado in the third inning tied the score, 2–2. In the bottom of the third, Steve Pearce grounded into a fielder's choice—which was called an inning-ending double play on the field, but overturned by video review—and the Red Sox regained the lead on an RBI double by Martinez in the following at-bat. In the top of the fifth, a groundout by Machado plated Brian Dozier to even the score, 3–3. Sale wound up pitching into the fifth inning, allowing three runs on five hits and two walks with seven strikeouts. The Red Sox loaded the bases with no outs in the bottom of the fifth, and scored the go-ahead run when Xander Bogaerts grounded into a fielder's choice. A single by Rafael Devers off reliever Ryan Madson in the next at-bat made it 5–3. Kershaw's final line was five runs on seven hits and three walks with five strikeouts in four-plus innings. The Dodgers loaded the bases in the seventh off reliever Ryan Brasier and scored a run on a sacrifice fly by Machado. Eduardo Núñez hit a pinch-hit three-run home run off Alex Wood in the bottom of the seventh to make it a four-run lead for the Red Sox, 8–4, with no further scoring in the game. Boston reliever Matt Barnes, who finished the fifth inning after relieving Sale, got the win, while Kershaw took the loss for Los Angeles.

=== Game 2 ===
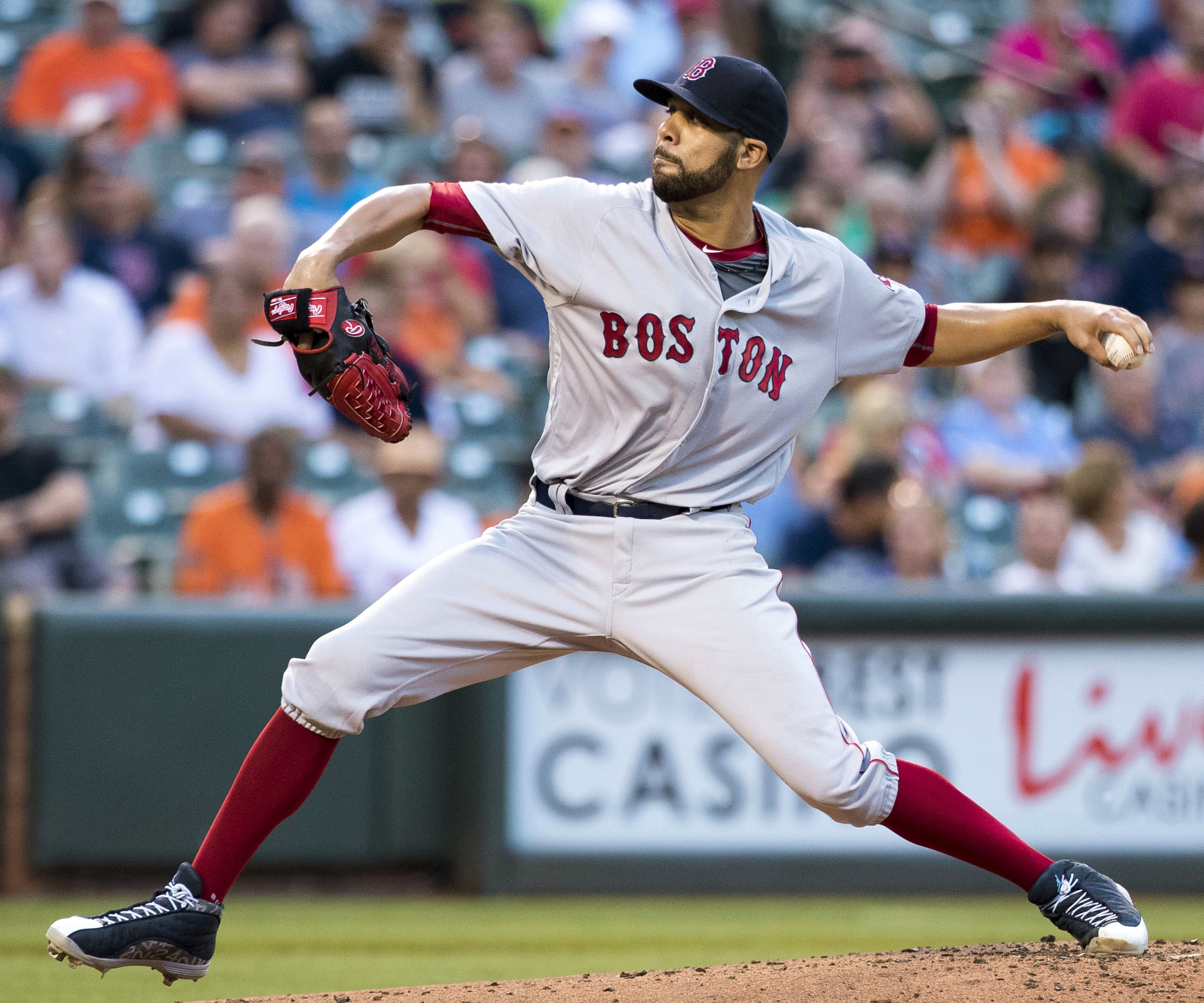
Boston starter David Price got the win in Game 2, his second win of the 2018 postseason.

October 24, 2018, 8:10 pm (EDT) at Fenway Park in Boston, Massachusetts, 47 °F (8 °C), cloudy
Team	1	2	3	4	5	6	7	8	9	R	H	E
Los Angeles	0	0	0	2	0	0	0	0	0	2	3	0
Boston	0	1	0	0	3	0	0	0	X	4	8	0
WP: David Price (1–0) LP: Hyun-jin Ryu (0–1) Sv: Craig Kimbrel (1); Attendance: 38,644; Boxscore

Game 2 featured another matchup of left-handed pitchers; Boston started David Price, who got the win in Game 5 of the 2018 American League Championship Series, while Los Angeles started Hyun-jin Ryu, who took the loss in Game 6 of the 2018 National League Championship Series. The Red Sox again scored first, this time in the second inning, when Xander Bogaerts doubled and then scored on a single by Ian Kinsler. The Dodgers loaded the bases in the fourth inning and David Freese scored on a sacrifice fly by Matt Kemp to tie the game; Yasiel Puig then singled to drive in Manny Machado with the go-ahead run. After the Red Sox loaded the bases against Ryu in the bottom of the fifth, reliever Ryan Madson walked in the tying run and J. D. Martinez drove in two more with a single. Ryu's final line was four runs allowed on six hits and one walk with five strikeouts in 4 2/3 innings. Price only allowed two runs on three hits and three walks in six innings while striking out five. Both bullpens prevented more runs from scoring as the Red Sox won, 4–2, to take a two games to none lead. Ryu took the loss for the Dodgers, while Price earned the win for Boston with closer Craig Kimbrel getting his sixth save this postseason. It was also the 100th postseason victory in Red Sox franchise history.

=== Game 3 ===
External videos
- Game 3 Full replay on the MLB Vault's official YouTube channel

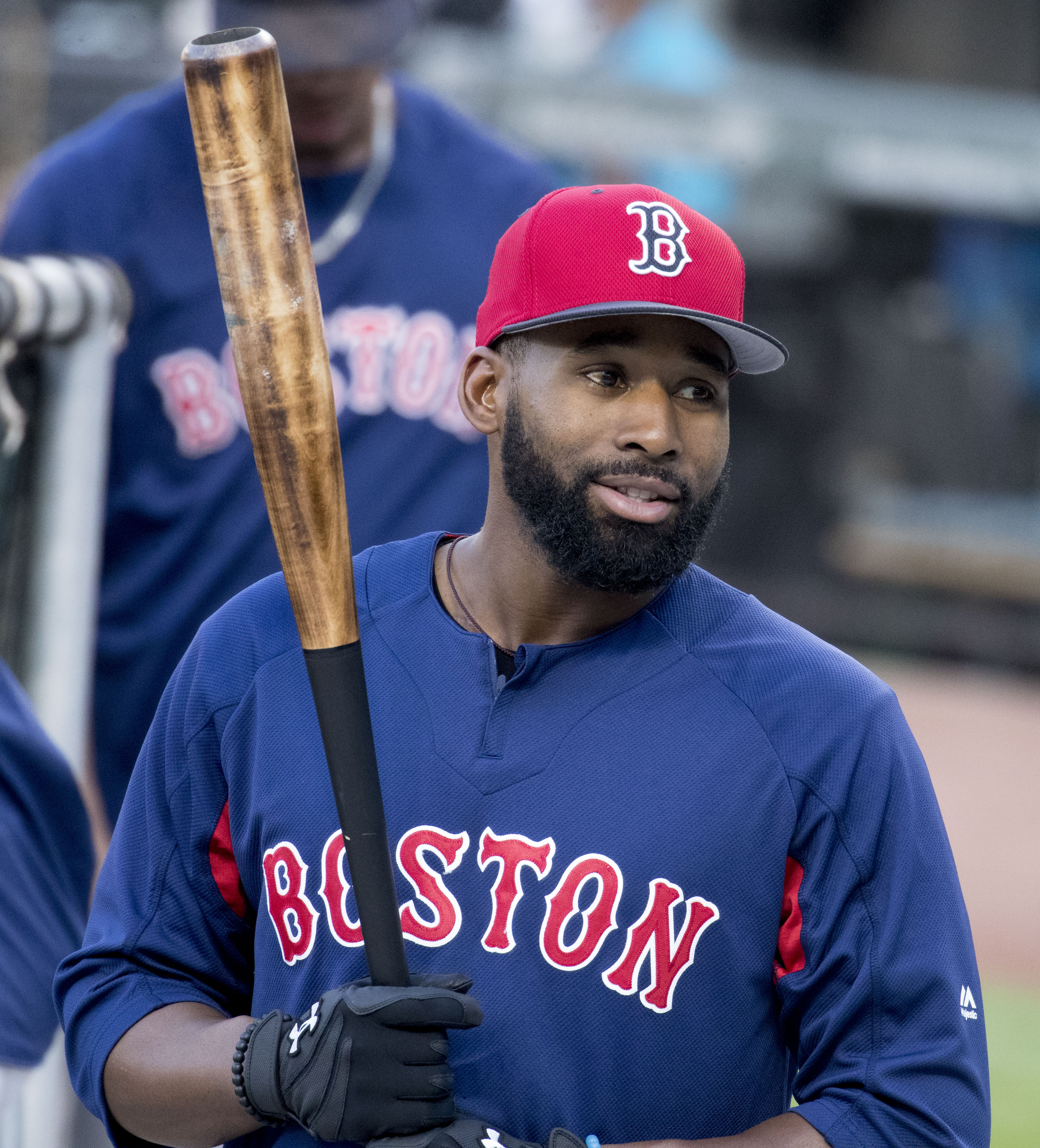
Jackie Bradley Jr. tied the game, 1–1, with a two-out solo home run in the eighth inning.

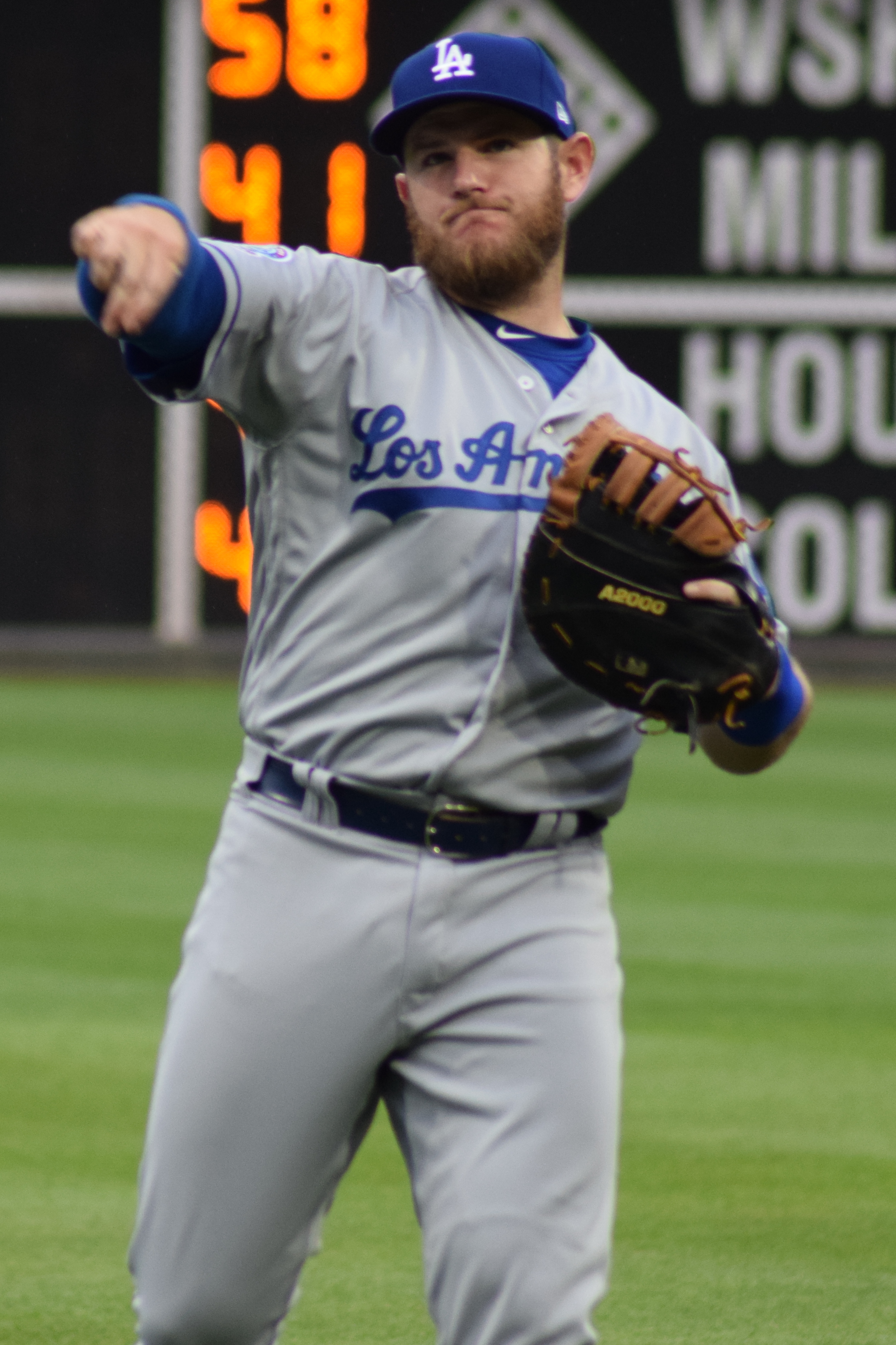
Max Muncy hit the game-winning home run in the 18th inning of Game 3.

October 26, 2018, 5:10 pm (PDT) at Dodger Stadium in Los Angeles, California, 78 °F (26 °C), clear
Team	1	2	3	4	5	6	7	8	9	10	11	12	13	14	15	16	17	18	R	H	E
Boston	0	0	0	0	0	0	0	1	0	0	0	0	1	0	0	0	0	0	2	7	1
Los Angeles	0	0	1	0	0	0	0	0	0	0	0	0	1	0	0	0	0	1	3	11	1
WP: Alex Wood (1–0) LP: Nathan Eovaldi (0–1); Home runs: BOS: Jackie Bradley Jr. (1); LAD: Joc Pederson (1), Max Muncy (1); Attendance: 53,114; Boxscore

After two games started by left-handed pitchers, both teams started right-handed pitchers for Game 3; Walker Buehler for the Dodgers and Rick Porcello for the Red Sox. With no designated hitter, J. D. Martinez started in left field for the Red Sox, in place of usual left fielder Andrew Benintendi. The Dodgers scored first, for the first time in the series, when Joc Pederson homered in the third inning. Porcello pitched 4 2/3 innings, allowing the one run on three hits and one walk while striking out five. Buehler pitched seven scoreless innings allowing only two hits with no walks and seven strikeouts. Jackie Bradley Jr. hit a home run off Kenley Jansen with two outs in the eighth inning to tie the game. It was Jansen's first blown save in four opportunities this postseason.

Cody Bellinger led off the bottom of the ninth with a single but was caught between first and second after an early stealing attempt, and the game went into extra innings tied at one. In the top of the 10th inning, the Red Sox had runners on first and third, and pinch-runner Ian Kinsler attempted to score from third on pinch-hitter Eduardo Núñez's sacrifice fly, but a strong throw by center fielder Bellinger saw Kinsler out at the plate to end the top half. In the 13th inning, Brock Holt walked, advanced on a wild pitch, and scored the go-ahead run when Núñez hit a soft grounder that pitcher Scott Alexander failed to corral to Muncy. The Red Sox then loaded the bases on a Sandy León double and a Betts intentional walk, but did not score any insurance. Then, in the bottom of the inning, Max Muncy led off with a walk on a disputed check swing on a full count against Nathan Eovaldi. Eovaldi got the next two outs, but on the second, Muncy advanced to second on a pop out to Núñez in foul territory (Nuñez made a great catch and tumbled into the stands after making the catch, which allowed Muncy to advance). Yasiel Puig then hit a grounder to right that Kinsler gathered, but he proceeded to throw it wide of first base, leaving Puig safe and scoring Muncy on the error.

The next action would occur in the 15th, where the Red Sox led off with two consecutive base runners against Kenta Maeda. However, Maeda managed to throw out Núñez at third on a Christian Vázquez sacrifice bunt, followed by strikeouts of Leon and Betts (although the latter was likely a ball). In the bottom of the 15th, after an epic eight pitch at-bat, Muncy appeared to hit a walk-off home run down the right-field line, but the ball hooked foul. Eovaldi then proceeded to strike Muncy out on the next pitch. The game then churned on, with Eovaldi pitching 1-2-3 innings in the 15th, 16th and 17th. However, the Red Sox did not take advantage, and to lead off the bottom of the 18th, Muncy got the last laugh against Eovaldi, hitting a walk-off home run to left-center on Eovaldi's 97th pitch to win it for the Dodgers, 3–2, to cut their series deficit to 2–1. Eovaldi had just begun his seventh inning of relief.

At 18 innings and seven hours and 20 minutes, this contest became the longest World Series game by both innings and time, surpassing (in playing time) Game 3 of the 2005 World Series, which lasted 14 innings and five hours and 41 minutes, and breaking the record (in innings) first set in Game 2 of the 1916 World Series, when the Red Sox and Dodgers (then known as the Robins) played 14 innings. This has since been tied with Game 3 of the 2025 World Series, also contested by the Dodgers and played at Dodger Stadium, which also lasted 18 innings, but played six hours and 39 minutes. Muncy tied the record for latest (18th inning) walk-off hit in postseason history, equalling Chris Burke in Game 4 of the 2005 National League Division Series. It was also the Dodgers' first game-winning World Series home run since Kirk Gibson in Game 1 of the 1988 World Series. The game took longer to play than the entire 1939 World Series, which had seven hours and five minutes of total playing time over four games.

Until Game 1 of the 2022 World Series, this was the last World Series game to go to extra innings. Until Game 2 of the 2021 World Series, this was the last time a team won a World Series game in their home ballpark.

=== Game 4 ===
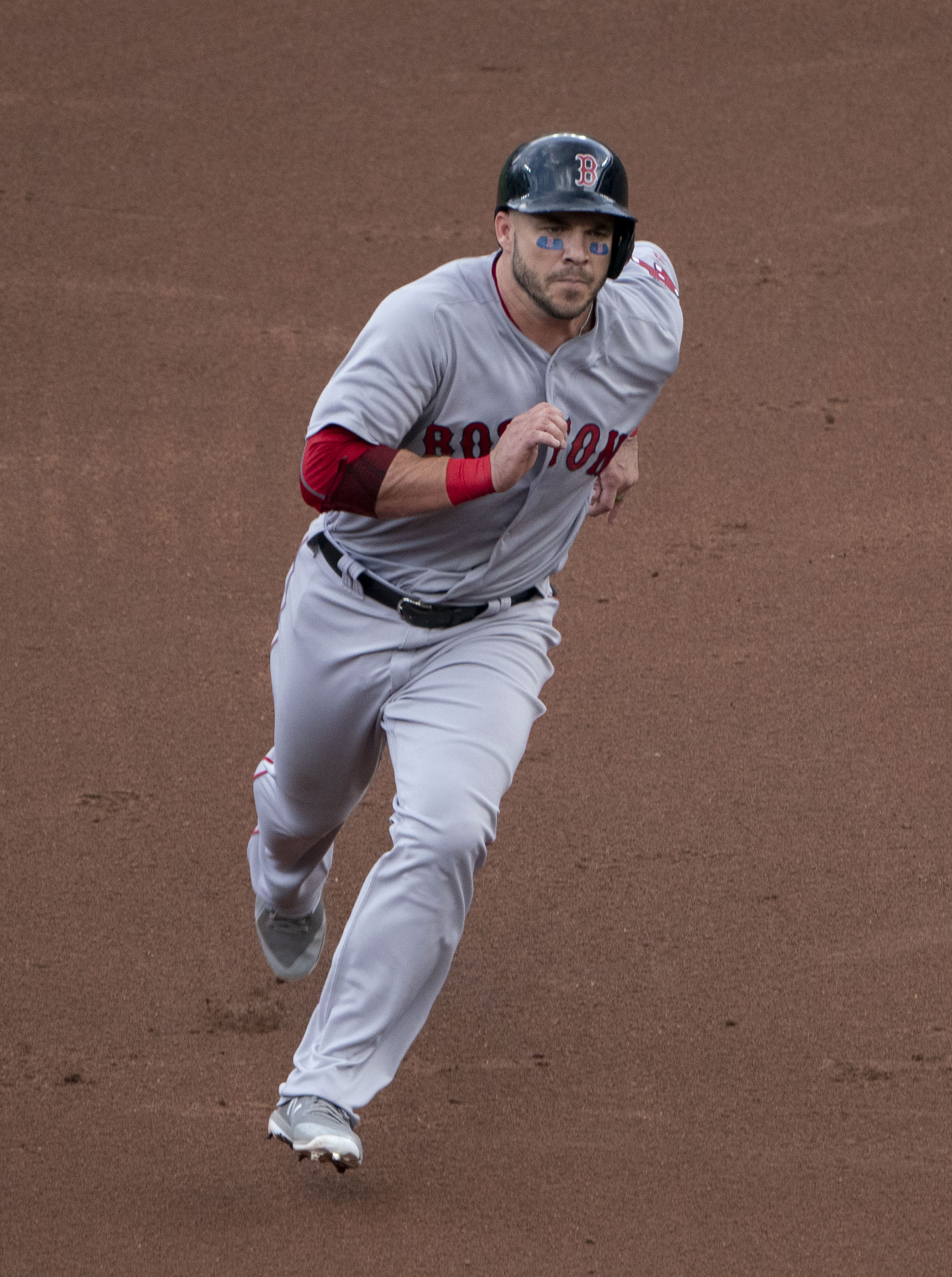
Steve Pearce had four RBIs and scored twice in Boston's Game 4 win.

October 27, 2018, 5:11 pm (PDT) at Dodger Stadium in Los Angeles, California, 74 °F (23 °C), clear
Team	1	2	3	4	5	6	7	8	9	R	H	E
Boston	0	0	0	0	0	0	3	1	5	9	8	1
Los Angeles	0	0	0	0	0	4	0	0	2	6	9	0
WP: Joe Kelly (1–0) LP: Dylan Floro (0–1); Home runs: BOS: Mitch Moreland (1), Steve Pearce (1); LAD: Yasiel Puig (1), Kiké Hernández (1); Attendance: 54,400; Boxscore

Following the longest game in World Series history, the Dodgers started Rich Hill while Eduardo Rodríguez made his first start of the postseason for the Red Sox. At 38 years old, Hill was the oldest player to start a World Series game since 39-year-old Tim Hudson started two games for the San Francisco Giants in 2014 and the oldest for the Dodgers since Sal Maglie in 1956. As he had pitched in relief in Game 3, Rodríguez became just the sixth pitcher in history to start a World Series game with zero days rest, and the first since Firpo Marberry of the Washington Senators in the 1924 World Series. The Red Sox had intended to start Nathan Eovaldi, but he needed rest after throwing 97 pitches in relief in Game 3. With no designated hitter, the Red Sox started an outfield of Andrew Benintendi, Mookie Betts, and J. D. Martinez, with Jackie Bradley Jr. on the bench in place of Benintendi, who did not start the previous game.

The game was scoreless through the first five innings. In the bottom of the sixth, the Dodgers loaded the bases against Rodríguez. David Freese was hit by a pitch to lead off, then pinch runner Kiké Hernández went to third on Justin Turner's double. Rodriguez intentionally walked Manny Machado to load the bases. Cody Bellinger then hit an apparent double-play ground ball to first. Boston first baseman Steve Pearce forced out Hernández at home for the first out, but catcher Christian Vázquez's throw to first got away for an error, which allowed Turner to score the first run and allowed Machado to advance to third. The next batter, Yasiel Puig, hit a three-run home run to end Rodriguez's night and extend the lead to 4–0. In a fit of rage, Rodríguez slammed his glove down on the mound in frustration and was later pulled after pitching 5 2/3 innings, allowing the four runs on four hits and two walks with six strikeouts. At that point, Red Sox ace Chris Sale made an angry speech that fired up his teammates in the dugout. In the top of the seventh, after striking out Eduardo Núñez with a runner on first, Hill was taken off the mound in favor of reliever Ryan Madson, a decision by Roberts which was criticized by several including then-current President Donald Trump. Mitch Moreland hit a three-run pinch-hit home run off of Madson to make it a one-run game. Hill was charged with one run in 6 1/3 innings on one hit and three walks with seven strikeouts. Madson set a new World Series record by allowing seven inherited runners to score in the series. Steve Pearce hit a homer off Kenley Jansen in the eighth inning. This was the second straight day Jansen allowed a game-tying home run in that inning. Jansen became just the second pitcher in World Series history to allow game-tying home runs in back-to-back games (Byung-hyun Kim for the Arizona Diamondbacks in 2001 was the other). In the top of the ninth, the Los Angeles bullpen collapsed. Dylan Floro retired Núñez to start the inning, but then gave up a double to Brock Holt, who was then driven in by a single by pinch hitter Rafael Devers to give Boston their first lead of the game. After Floro retired Blake Swihart, he intentionally walked Mookie Betts, then Alex Wood gave up an infield single to Andrew Benintendi, loading the bases for Boston with two outs and leading to Wood getting relieved by Kenta Maeda. Next, Pearce delivered the key blow for the Red Sox: a bases-clearing double to put them up, 8–4. They added another run when Xander Bogaerts drove in Pearce with a single. Maeda was finally able to send the game to the bottom of the ninth when he retired Núñez, who led off the inning. Hernández hit a two-run homer off of Craig Kimbrel in the ninth to cut the lead to three. Kimbrel was able to get the last three outs and the Red Sox took a three games to one lead.

=== Game 5 ===
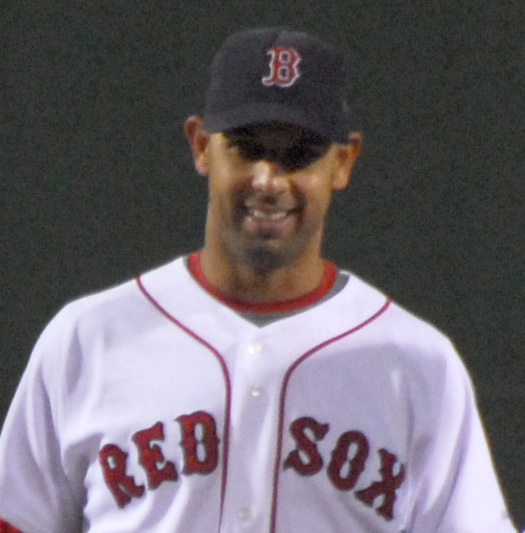
Alex Cora, seen here as a player in 2008, led the Red Sox to the World Series championship in his first year as manager.

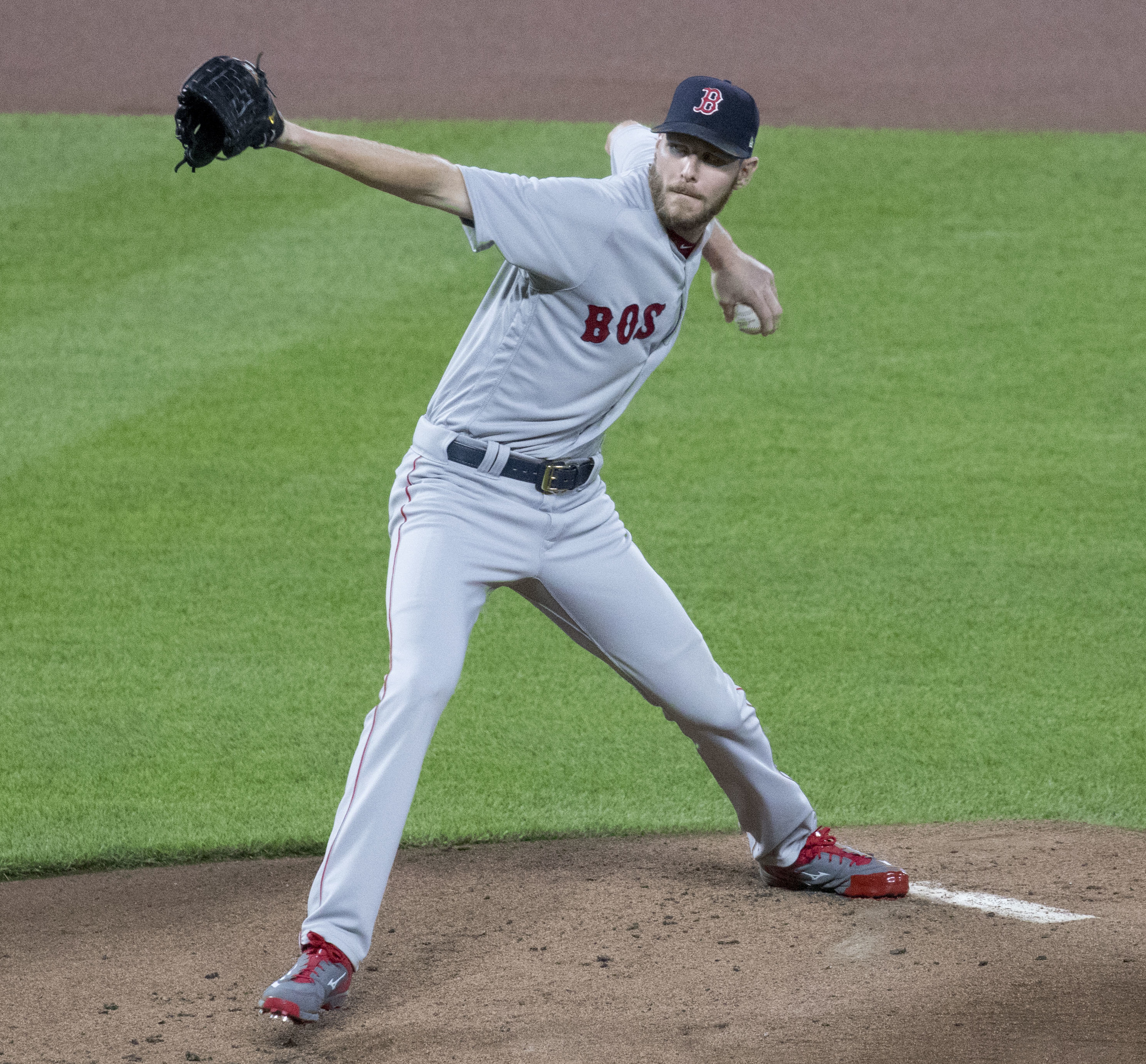
Chris Sale finished the World Series in relief in the 9th inning.

October 28, 2018, 5:17 pm (PDT) at Dodger Stadium in Los Angeles, California, 77 °F (25 °C), partly cloudy
Team	1	2	3	4	5	6	7	8	9	R	H	E
Boston	2	0	0	0	0	1	1	1	0	5	8	0
Los Angeles	1	0	0	0	0	0	0	0	0	1	3	0
WP: David Price (2–0) LP: Clayton Kershaw (0–2); Home runs: BOS: Steve Pearce 2 (3), Mookie Betts (1), J. D. Martinez (1); LAD: David Freese (1); Attendance: 54,367; Boxscore

On October 28, Los Angeles became the first city to host an MLB, NFL (Rams), NBA (Clippers), NHL (Kings), and MLS (Galaxy) game all on the same day. Before the game, Magic Johnson and Larry Bird promoted the game, giving reminders that both Boston and Los Angeles were squaring off for a championship, though in the World Series for the first time; the Boston Celtics and the Los Angeles Lakers met in the NBA Finals 11 times since the Lakers moved from Minneapolis in 1960.

Clayton Kershaw started for the Dodgers, while David Price started for the Red Sox. Price became the first pitcher to start World Series games no more than four days apart while also pitching in relief between those games since Jack Billingham of the Cincinnati Reds did so in the 1972 World Series. Jackie Bradley Jr. again did not start in the outfield for Boston, but entered the game as a defensive replacement in the bottom of the ninth inning.

Both teams scored in the first inning. The Red Sox scored in the top of the inning after a one out single by Andrew Benintendi followed by a two-run home run by Steve Pearce. David Freese led off the bottom of the inning with a home run for the Dodgers. No one else scored until the sixth inning, when Mookie Betts hit a home run with one out and then J. D. Martinez hit a lead-off homer in the seventh to make it 4–1. Kershaw pitched seven innings, allowing four runs on seven hits, with five strikeouts and no walks. In the eighth inning, Pearce hit another home run, this time off of Pedro Báez. Price pitched into the eighth, allowing only one run on three hits and two walks while striking out five. He became just the fifth pitcher to pitch 6+ innings and allow three or fewer hits in three straight postseason starts. Joe Kelly and Chris Sale pitched the last two innings and both struck out the side, Sale getting Manny Machado to strike out for the last out, the Red Sox winning the game 5–1 and the title 4–1. The Red Sox broke a tie with the San Francisco Giants for the most World Series wins this century with four. Pearce won the World Series Most Valuable Player Award.

== Series statistics ==
=== Series Line Score ===
Team	1	2	3	4	5	6	7	8	9	10	11	12	13	14	15	16	17	18	R	H	E
Los Angeles Dodgers	1	1	2	2	1	4	1	0	2	0	0	0	1	0	0	0	0	1	16	34	1
Boston Red Sox	4	1	1	0	5	1	7	3	5	0	0	0	1	0	0	0	0	0	28	42	2
Home runs: LAD: David Freese (1), Kiké Hernández (1), Matt Kemp (1), Max Muncy (1), Joc Pederson (1), Yasiel Puig (1); BOS: Steve Pearce (3), Mookie Betts (1), Jackie Bradley Jr. (1), J. D. Martinez (1), Mitch Moreland (1), Eduardo Núñez (1); Total attendance: 238,979 Average attendance: 47,796; Winning player's share: $416,838.72 Losing player's share: $262,027.49

=== Boston Red Sox ===
==== Batting ====
Note: GP=Games played; AB=At bats; R=Runs; H=Hits; 2B=Doubles; 3B=Triples; HR=Home runs; RBI=Runs batted in; BB=Walks; AVG=Batting average; OBP=On base percentage; SLG=Slugging percentage

Player	GP	AB	R	H	2B	3B	HR	RBI	BB	AVG	OBP	SLG	Reference
Andrew Benintendi	5	18	6	6	1	0	0	1	1	.333	.368	.389	
Mookie Betts	5	23	5	5	1	0	1	1	3	.217	.308	.391	
Xander Bogaerts	5	22	2	3	1	0	0	2	3	.136	.240	.182	
Jackie Bradley Jr.	5	13	1	3	0	0	1	1	2	.231	.333	.462	
Rafael Devers	5	14	1	3	0	0	0	2	1	.214	.267	.214	
Nathan Eovaldi	3	2	0	0	0	0	0	0	0	.000	.000	.000	
Brock Holt	3	12	3	2	1	0	0	0	3	.167	.333	.250	
Ian Kinsler	3	10	0	1	0	0	0	1	0	.100	.100	.100	
Sandy León	3	6	0	3	1	0	0	0	1	.500	.571	.667	
J. D. Martinez	5	18	2	5	1	0	1	5	3	.278	.381	.500	
Mitch Moreland	4	8	1	1	0	0	1	3	0	.125	.125	.500	
Eduardo Núñez	3	10	1	3	0	0	1	3	0	.300	.300	.600	
Steve Pearce	5	12	5	4	1	0	3	8	4	.333	.500	1.167	
David Price	3	3	0	0	0	0	0	0	0	.000	.000	.000	
Eduardo Rodríguez	3	1	0	0	0	0	0	0	0	.000	.500	.000	
Blake Swihart	2	2	0	0	0	0	0	0	0	.000	.000	.000	
Christian Vazquez	4	15	1	3	0	0	0	0	0	.200	.200	.200	

==== Pitching ====
Note: G=Games Played; GS=Games Started; IP=Innings Pitched; H=Hits; BB=Walks; R=Runs; ER=Earned Runs; SO=Strikeouts; W=Wins; L=Losses; SV=Saves; ERA=Earned Run Average

Player	G	GS	IP	H	BB	R	ER	SO	W	L	SV	ERA	Reference
Matt Barnes	3	0	2 1/3	2	1	0	0	4	1	0	0	0.00	
Ryan Brasier	2	0	1 2/3	3	1	1	1	1	0	0	0	5.40	
Nathan Eovaldi	3	0	8	3	1	2	1	6	0	1	0	1.12	
Heath Hembree	1	0	1	0	1	0	0	1	0	0	0	0.00	
Joe Kelly	5	0	6	4	0	0	0	10	1	0	0	0.00	
Craig Kimbrel	4	0	4 1/3	3	2	2	2	2	0	0	1	4.15	
Rick Porcello	1	1	4 2/3	3	1	1	1	5	0	0	0	1.93	
David Price	3	2	13 2/3	7	6	3	3	10	2	0	0	1.98	
Eduardo Rodríguez	3	1	6 1/3	4	2	4	4	7	0	0	0	5.68	
Chris Sale	2	1	5	5	2	3	3	10	0	0	0	5.40	

=== Los Angeles Dodgers ===
==== Batting ====
Note: GP=Games played; AB=At bats; R=Runs; H=Hits; 2B=Doubles; 3B=Triples; HR=Home runs; RBI=Runs batted in; BB=Walks; AVG=Batting average; OBP=On base percentage; SLG=Slugging percentage

Player	GP	AB	R	H	2B	3B	HR	RBI	BB	AVG	OBP	SLG	Reference
Austin Barnes	5	11	0	0	0	0	0	0	1	.000	.083	.000	
Cody Bellinger	5	16	1	1	0	0	0	0	0	.063	.063	.063	
Walker Buehler	1	2	0	0	0	0	0	0	0	.000	.000	.000	
Brian Dozier	4	5	2	0	0	0	0	0	3	.000	.375	.000	
David Freese	5	12	2	5	0	1	1	1	1	.417	.500	.833	
Yasmani Grandal	5	5	0	1	0	0	0	0	2	.200	.429	.200	
Enrique Hernández	5	15	1	2	0	0	1	2	0	.133	.133	.333	
Rich Hill	1	2	0	0	0	0	0	0	0	.000	.000	.000	
Matt Kemp	4	9	1	1	0	0	1	2	0	.111	.100	.444	
Clayton Kershaw	3	3	0	0	0	0	0	0	0	.000	.000	.000	
Manny Machado	5	22	2	4	0	0	0	3	1	.182	.208	.182	
Max Muncy	5	17	3	4	1	0	1	1	2	.235	.316	.471	
Joc Pederson	5	12	1	1	0	0	1	1	0	.083	.083	.333	
Yasiel Puig	5	20	1	5	0	0	1	4	1	.250	.286	.400	
Chris Taylor	5	14	0	2	0	0	0	0	4	.143	.333	.143	
Justin Turner	5	24	2	8	2	0	0	0	2	.333	.385	.417	

==== Pitching ====
Note: G=Games Played; GS=Games Started; IP=Innings Pitched; H=Hits; BB=Walks; R=Runs; ER=Earned Runs; SO=Strikeouts; W=Wins; L=Losses; SV=Saves; ERA=Earned Run Average

Player	G	GS	IP	H	BB	R	ER	SO	W	L	SV	ERA	Reference
Scott Alexander	3	0	1 1/3	1	2	2	2	2	0	0	0	13.50	
Pedro Báez	4	0	4 2/3	2	3	2	2	4	0	0	0	3.86	
Walker Buehler	1	1	7	2	0	0	0	7	0	0	0	0.00	
Dylan Floro	2	0	2 1/3	3	2	3	3	3	0	1	0	11.57	
Rich Hill	1	1	6 1/3	1	3	1	1	7	0	0	0	1.42	
Kenley Jansen	3	0	4	2	1	2	2	3	0	0	0	4.50	
Clayton Kershaw	2	2	11	14	3	9	9	10	0	2	0	7.36	
Ryan Madson	4	0	2 1/3	3	2	1	1	2	0	0	0	3.86	
Kenta Maeda	3	0	3	4	2	1	1	6	0	0	0	3.00	
Hyun-jin Ryu	1	1	4 2/3	6	1	4	4	5	0	1	0	7.71	
Julio Urías	3	0	3	1	1	1	1	2	0	0	0	3.00	
Alex Wood	3	0	2 1/3	3	1	2	2	2	1	0	0	7.71	

== Broadcasting ==
=== Television ===
The World Series was televised nationally by Fox for the 19th straight year. Joe Buck was the play-by-play announcer, with John Smoltz as the color commentator. Ken Rosenthal and Tom Verducci were the field reporters. Fox Deportes offered a Spanish-language feed, with Rolando Nichols providing play-by-play and Carlos Álvarez and Edgar Gonzalez doing color commentary.

Outside of the United States, MLB International carried the series with play-by-play by Matt Vasgersian and color commentary by Buck Martinez.

==== Ratings ====
Game	Ratings (households)	Share (households)	U.S. audience (in millions)	Ref
1	8.2	16	13.761	
2	8.1	15	13.458	
3	7.9	18	13.251	
4	7.9	16	13.563	
5	10.0	18	17.634	

=== Radio ===
ESPN Radio broadcast all the World Series games in English for the 21st straight year as part of Major League Baseball on ESPN Radio. Dan Shulman called the play-by-play, with Chris Singleton serving as color analyst and Buster Olney as field reporter. Marc Kestecher hosted the pre-game show with Olney and Tim Kurkjian reporting. Jon Sciambi called the play-by-play for Game 5 due to Shulman developing laryngitis.

ESPN Deportes Radio provided Spanish-language coverage of the Series. Eduardo Ortega called the play-by-play and Orlando Hernández, Renato Bermudez, and José Francisco Rivera served as analysts.

Locally, both teams' flagship radio stations broadcast the series with their regular announcers, which were simulcast over SiriusXM radio. In Los Angeles, the broadcast was on AM 570 LA Sports with Charley Steiner and Rick Monday in English, on Univision America 1020 with Jaime Jarrín and Jorge Jarrín in Spanish, and on Radio Korea 1540 AM in Korean. The Red Sox broadcast was on WEEI 93.7 FM in English with Joe Castiglione, Tim Neverett and Lou Merloni, and in Spanish on WCCM 1490 AM with Uri Berenguer.

== Sponsorship ==
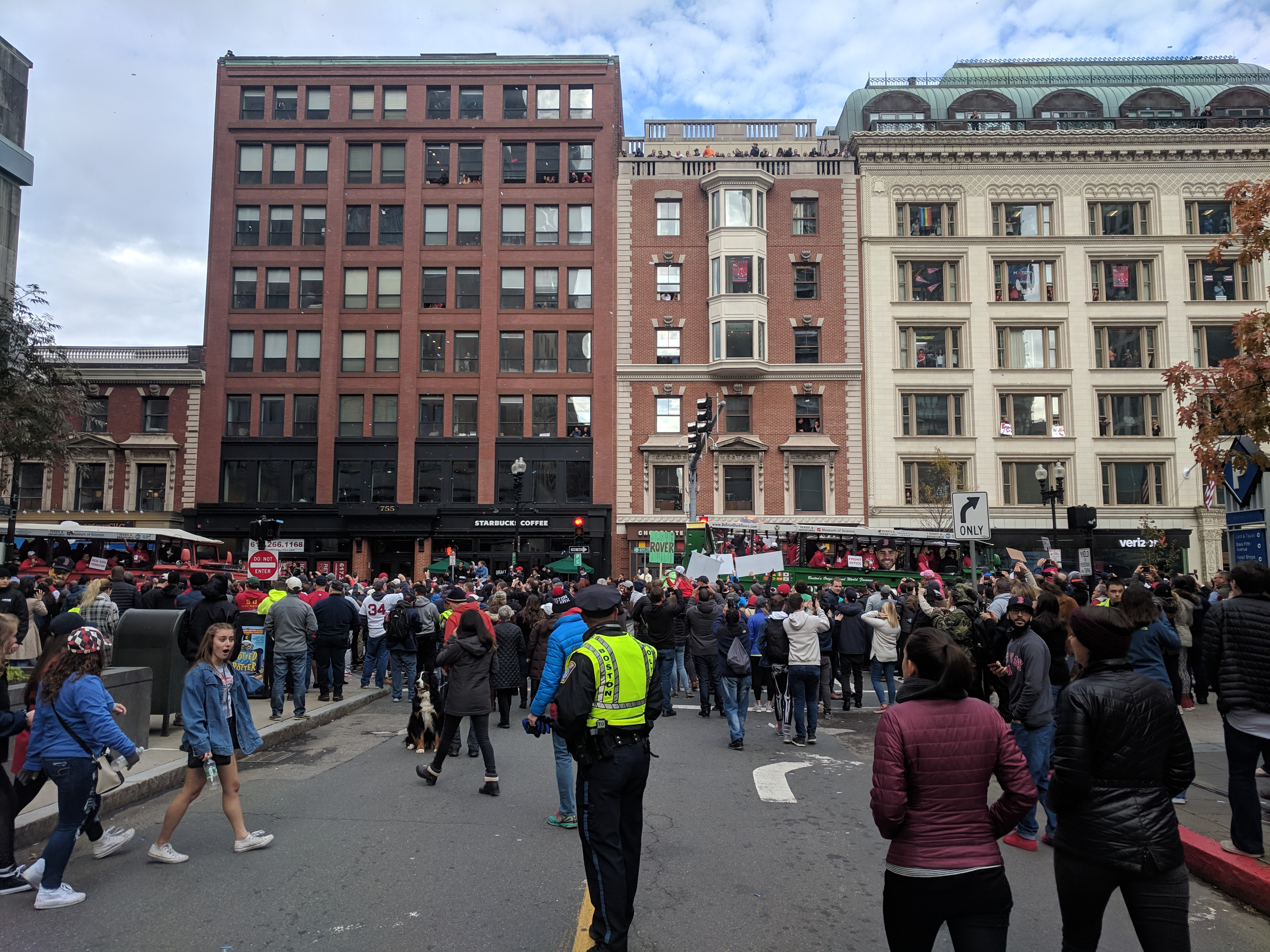
The Red Sox held a victory parade in Boston on October 31.

The 2018 World Series was sponsored by YouTube TV, the second consecutive year that the service sponsored the series. This sponsorship included logo branding in-stadium and on official digital properties, on the field, as well as commercial inventory during Fox's telecasts of the games. As part of the agreement, YouTube TV would later sponsor the 2019 World Series.

== Celebration ==
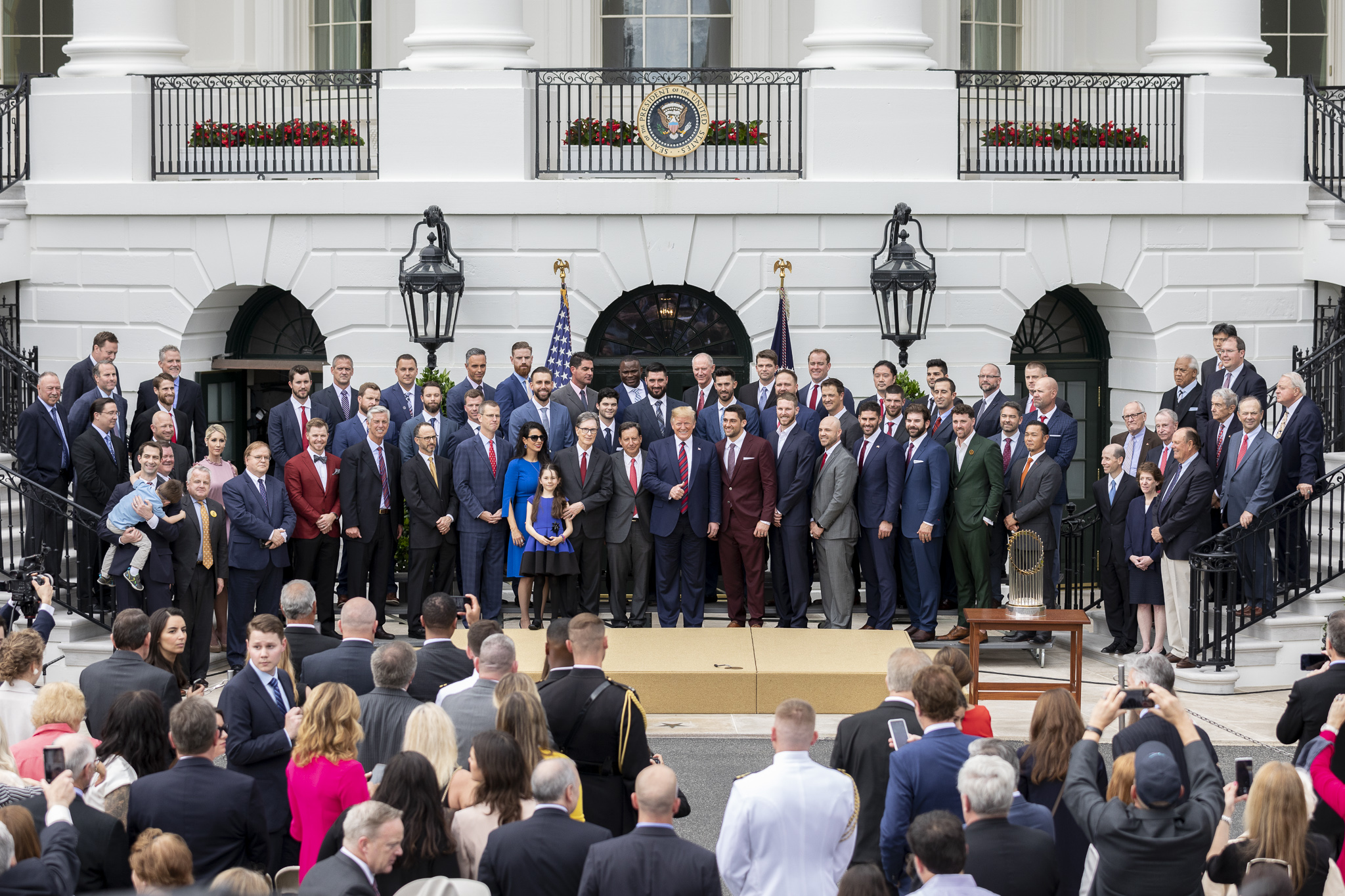
Red Sox at the White House with President Trump on May 9, 2019

On the morning of October 31, the Red Sox celebration parade began at Fenway Park and made its way downtown to its final destination on Staniford Street. During the celebration, the World Series trophy sustained minor damage from a beer can thrown by a spectator; it was subsequently repaired.

An 80-minute documentary, 2018 World Series: Damage Done, which was produced by MLB and narrated by Uzo Aduba, was released on December 4.

On December 3, Red Sox president Sam Kennedy announced that team accepted an invitation to visit the White House. Originally planned for February 15, 2019, the visit was postponed to May 9, 2019, due to the 2018–19 United States federal government shutdown. Alex Cora announced that he would not attend, citing the administration's response to Hurricane Maria in his native Puerto Rico. On May 9, various team members along with owner John W. Henry and president of baseball operations Dave Dombrowski visited the White House and met with President Trump.

== Aftermath ==
The Red Sox became the first team to win two World Series exactly one century apart, as they had defeated the Chicago Cubs in 1918, while the Dodgers were the first MLB franchise since the Texas Rangers of 2010 and 2011 to lose back-to-back World Series. It was the Dodgers third time they lost back-to-back World Series in their franchise history, following 1952–1953 (from their time in Brooklyn) and 1977–1978, with all four losses coming against the New York Yankees.

Four months after the 2018 World Series, the Patriots won Super Bowl LIII, meaning the Greater Boston area celebrated multiple championships for the 2018 MLB and NFL seasons. Boston teams had also accomplished feat 14 years prior, when the Red Sox won the 2004 World Series and the Patriots won Super Bowl XXXIX. Like the 2018 Red Sox, the 2018 Patriots beat a Los Angeles team, the Rams, in the championship game.

=== Boston Red Sox ===
The 2018 World Series was the peak for the 2016–2018 Red Sox, who were the first Red Sox's teams in franchise history to win the American League East (established in 1969) for three straight seasons. President of Baseball Operations Dave Dombrowski was fired on September 9, 2019, just 10 months after winning the 2018 World Series. On the field, Boston's top three starters in 2018 — Chris Sale, David Price, and Nathan Eovaldi — all missed significant time due to injury in 2019. Overall, the Red Sox finished 19 games behind the AL East-leading Yankees in 2019. After the season, the team hired Tampa Bay Rays executive Chaim Bloom to replace Dombrowski.

Four significant events happened to the Red Sox before the start of the 2020 season that shaped the course of the team's future:

- On January 7, 2020, the Red Sox were implicated in another sign stealing scandal (the team had previously been fined in 2017 for sign stealing) after three unnamed team members told The Athletic that the Red Sox had used their replay room to steal signs of opposing teams during the 2018 season. On January 13, 2020, Manfred stated that he would determine the appropriate punishment for Red Sox manager Alex Cora, who was also implicated in the Astros scandal, when the investigation was completed. The next day, Cora and the Red Sox mutually agreed to part ways and it was announced he would be suspended for the full season by Manfred. Bench coach Ron Roenicke was manager for the 2020 season. A few days after his season long suspension ended, Cora was re-hired as manager by the team.
- On February 10, 2020, the Red Sox traded Mookie Betts, David Price, and cash considerations (Boston continued to pay half of Price's contract) to the Los Angeles Dodgers in exchange for Alex Verdugo, Connor Wong, and Jeter Downs. The trade was very unpopular among Red Sox fans, as Betts was seen as the Red Sox's best player and one of the biggest stars in baseball.
- On March 19, 2020, the team announced that Chris Sale needed Tommy John surgery, effectively making him unable to pitch for all of 2020 and half of 2021.
- On April 22, 2020, the Red Sox were found guilty of stealing signs throughout the 2018 season through use of a replay room operator. The replay room operator, J.T. Watkins, was suspended throughout the 2020 season and barred from working in the replay room for the 2021 season. The Red Sox were also fined with the loss of a second-round draft pick during the 2020 MLB draft.

The Red Sox later finished the COVID-shortened 2020 season with a 24–36 record (.400 winning percentage), which was their worst season since 1965 in terms of win percentage. The team rebounded in 2021 and made it all the way to the ALCS, before eventually losing to the Houston Astros in six games.

Dombrowski later helped lead the Phillies to a World Series appearance as lead executive in 2022. He was the first lead executive to make World Series appearances with four different teams, having done so with the Florida Marlins in 1997, Detroit Tigers in 2006 and 2012, and the Boston Red Sox in 2018.

Rafael Devers was the final Red Sox player remaining from the 2018 championship team until he was traded to the San Francisco Giants in June 2025.

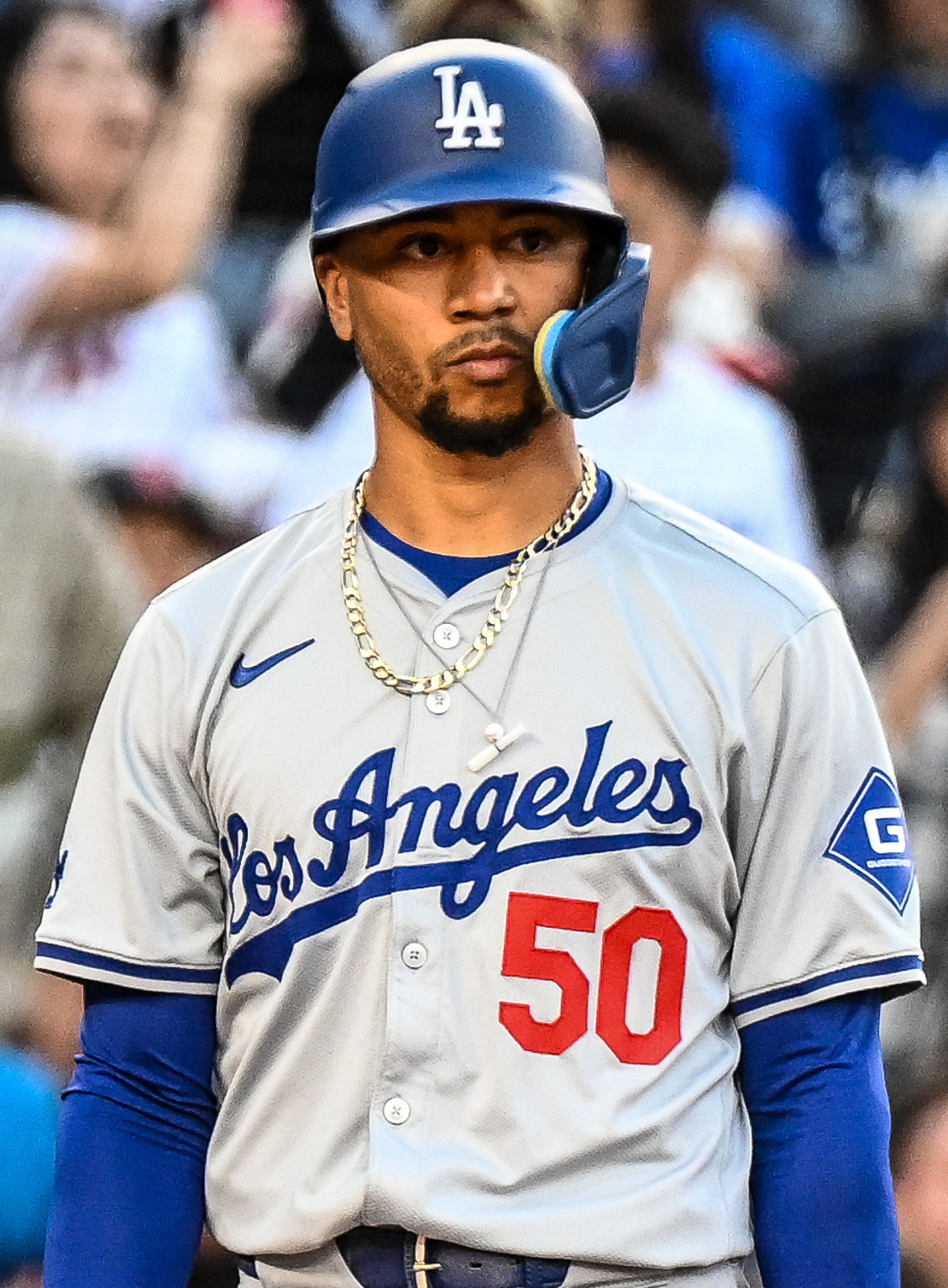
Betts with the Dodgers in 2024

=== Los Angeles Dodgers ===
Corey Seager returned to the Dodgers after being out for most of the 2018 season due to an elbow injury, while Manny Machado, who replaced him after the All-Star break, signed a record free agent contract with the San Diego Padres. The 2019 Dodgers broke the franchise record for wins at 106, but experienced October heartbreak once again by losing to eventual World Champion Washington Nationals in the NLDS in five games. The Dodgers became the second franchise to lose to the eventual World Series champions in four consecutive postseasons (the New York Yankees from 2001 to 2004 were the first).

The Dodgers traded for Mookie Betts during the 2019–20 off-season and his addition made a great team even better. Betts signed a 12-year, $365 million contract with the Dodgers. David Price was also included in the trade, and he pitched with the Dodgers from 2020 until his retirement after the 2022 season when his contract expired. The 2020 Dodgers held a (.717) winning percentage during the COVID-affected season, won their 8th straight division title, and won the 2020 World Series—their first championship in 32 years—against the Rays. The Dodgers of 2021 and 2022 posted very strong regular season records, winning 106 and 111 games respectively, but both fell short of the World Series. Helped by the signings of two-way superstar Shohei Ohtani and his fellow Japanese pitching phenom Yoshinobu Yamamoto, the Dodgers won the World Series in 2024, defeating Boston's chief rival, the New York Yankees, in five games. The next season, they successfully defended their championship by defeating the Toronto Blue Jays in seven games, becoming the first repeat champions since the 2000 Yankees; in Game 3 of the series, the Dodgers won their second 18-inning World Series game.

Over the years, many 2018 Red Sox and Dodgers ended up playing for their World Series opponent. Along with Price, and Betts; Heath Hembree, Joe Kelly, Craig Kimbrel, J.D. Martinez, and Ryan Brasier joined the Dodgers in the subsequent years after 2018. Meanwhile, Enrique "Kikè" Hernandez, Alex Verdugo, Rich Hill, Kenley Jansen, Justin Turner, and Walker Buehler later played for Boston. According to sportswriter John Tomase of NBC Sports Boston, up to 25% of the Boston Red Sox's 2023 projected Opening Day roster were players with direct ties to the Dodgers.

While most of the Dodgers' core players in 2018 later played for the World Series-winning team of 2020, Brian Dozier won his own World Series ring with the 2019 Washington Nationals.

== See also ==
- 2018 Japan Series
- 2018 Korean Series
- Celtics-Lakers rivalry
