= Eduardo Rodríguez (left-handed pitcher) =

Venezuelan baseball player (born 1993)

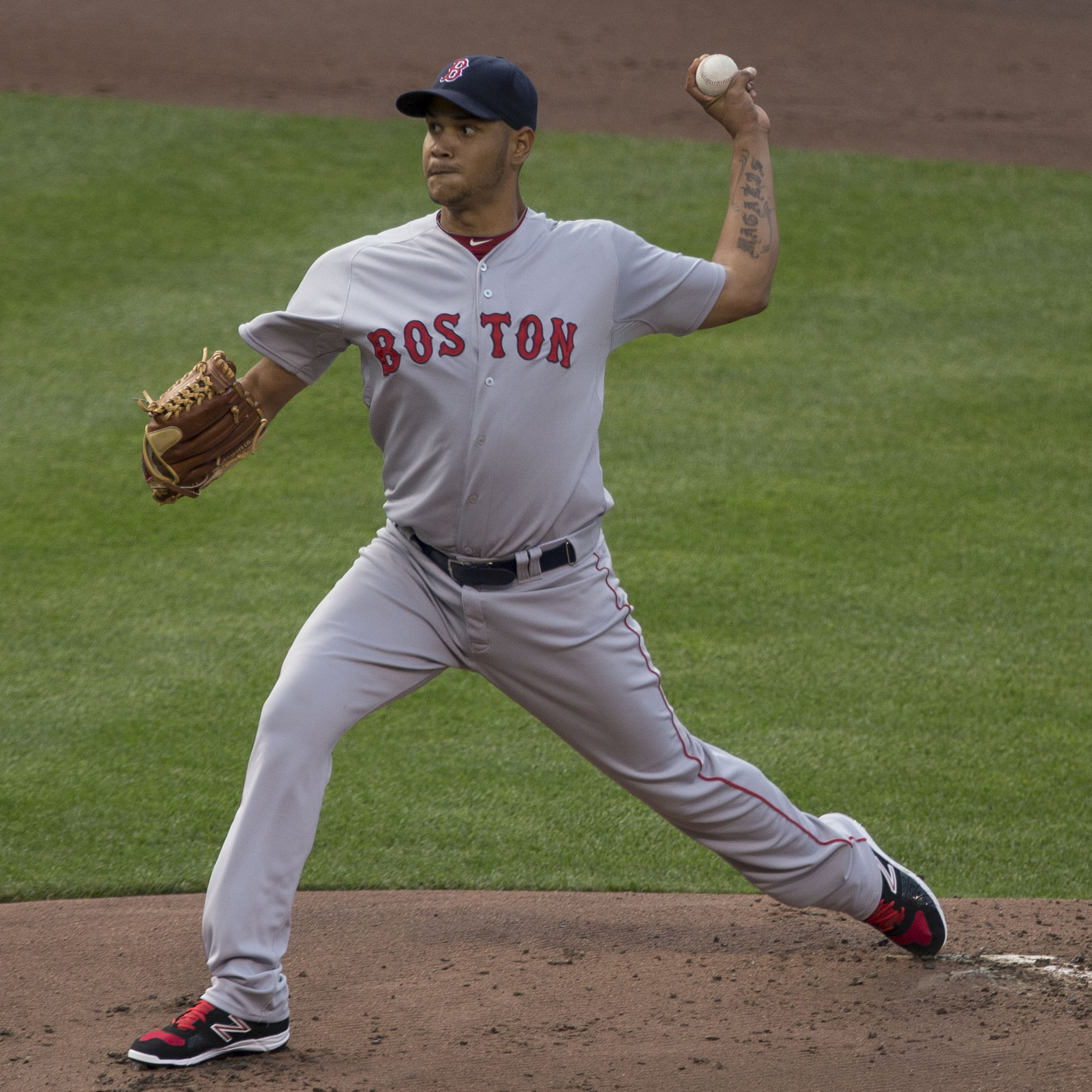
- Rodriguez with the Boston Red Sox in 2015

Arizona Diamondbacks – No. 57
- Pitcher
- Born: April 7, 1993 (age 33); Valencia, Carabobo, Venezuela
- Bats: Left Throws: Left

MLB debut
- May 28, 2015, for the Boston Red Sox

MLB statistics (through 2026 season)
- Win–loss record: 110–73
- Earned run average: 4.02
- Strikeouts: 1,440
- Stats at Baseball Reference

Teams
- Boston Red Sox (2015–2019, 2021); Detroit Tigers (2022–2023); Arizona Diamondbacks (2024–present)

Career highlights and awards
- All-Star (2026); World Series champion (2018)
Medals
Men's baseball
Representing Venezuela
World Baseball Classic
Gold medal – first place	2026 Miami	Team

Eduardo José Rodríguez Hernández (born April 7, 1993), nicknamed "E-Rod", is a Venezuelan professional baseball pitcher for the Arizona Diamondbacks of Major League Baseball (MLB). He has previously played in MLB for the Boston Red Sox and Detroit Tigers.

Rodríguez signed as an international free agent with the Baltimore Orioles' organization in 2010, was traded to the Red Sox during the 2014 season, and made his MLB debut in May 2015. With the Red Sox, he was a member of the 2018 World Series champions. Rodríguez signed with the Tigers as a free agent before the 2022 season. Following the 2023 season, he signed a four-year deal with the Diamondbacks. Rodríguez was named to his first All-Star game in 2026.

== Career ==
=== Baltimore Orioles ===
Rodríguez signed with the Baltimore Orioles as an international free agent in January 2010, receiving a $175,000 signing bonus. He made his professional debut that season with the Dominican Summer Orioles of the Rookie-level Dominican Summer League. He had a 3–4 win–loss record and a 2.33 earned run average (ERA), allowing only 48 hits and no home runs in 65 2/3 innings pitched, but he walked 28 batters.

In 2011, Rodríguez played for the Gulf Coast Orioles of the Rookie-level Gulf Coast League, where he had a 1.81 ERA, and a walks plus hits per inning pitched ratio of 1.01. He also made one start for the Aberdeen IronBirds of the Low–A New York–Penn League in 2011. In 2012, the Orioles assigned Rodríguez to the Delmarva Shorebirds of the Single–A South Atlantic League. With Delmarva, Rodríguez pitched to a 5–7 record with a 3.70 ERA in 22 games started, allowing 103 hits and 30 walks in 107 innings, while striking out 73 batters.

The Orioles invited Rodríguez to spring training as a non-roster player in 2013. Baseball America named Rodríguez as the Orioles' fifth best prospect before the start of the 2013 season. Rodríguez started the 2013 season with the Frederick Keys of the High–A Carolina League, where he had a 2.85 ERA in 14 games started. He appeared in the Carolina-California League All-Star Game, where he pitched a scoreless inning. Rodríguez was promoted to the Double–A Bowie Baysox of the Eastern League in June. Rodríguez, along with Henry Urrutia and Christian Walker, represented the Orioles at the 2013 All-Star Futures Game in July. He pitched one inning, allowing a hit and recording one strikeout. For Bowie, Rodríguez had a 4–3 record and a 4.22 ERA in 11 games started. After the conclusion of the regular season, the Orioles assigned Rodríguez to the Surprise Saguaros of the Arizona Fall League (AFL). He started the AFL's championship game, pitching three scoreless innings for the Mesa Solar Sox in a 2–0 victory.

Baseball America ranked Rodríguez as the Orioles' third best prospect and the 65th best in baseball before the 2014 season. MLB.com named Rodríguez the 68th best prospect, while ESPN rated him as the 43rd best prospect and Baseball Prospectus named him the 61st best prospect. The Orioles invited Rodríguez to spring training, and assigned him to start the 2014 season with Bowie. He missed five weeks of the season due to a sprained knee, and had a 3–7 win–loss record and a 4.79 ERA with Bowie through July.

=== Boston Red Sox ===
On July 31, 2014, the Orioles traded Rodríguez to the Boston Red Sox in exchange for Andrew Miller. Orioles' general manager Dan Duquette said that he "offered about 50 other pitchers" to Boston before agreeing to trade Rodríguez, as the Red Sox "required" him in a trade for Miller.

Rodríguez started his Red Sox career with the Portland Sea Dogs of the Eastern League. In six starts for Portland, Rodríguez had a 3–1 win–loss record with a 0.96 ERA, with 39 strikeouts and eight walks. He joined the Triple-A Pawtucket Red Sox of the International League for one start during the International League playoffs, pitching seven innings against the Durham Bulls in the Governors' Cup Finals.

After the 2014 season, the Red Sox added Rodriguez to its 40-man roster to protect him from being selected in the Rule 5 draft. He opened the 2015 season with Pawtucket, where he went 4–3 with a 2.98 ERA in eight starts.

==== 2015 ====
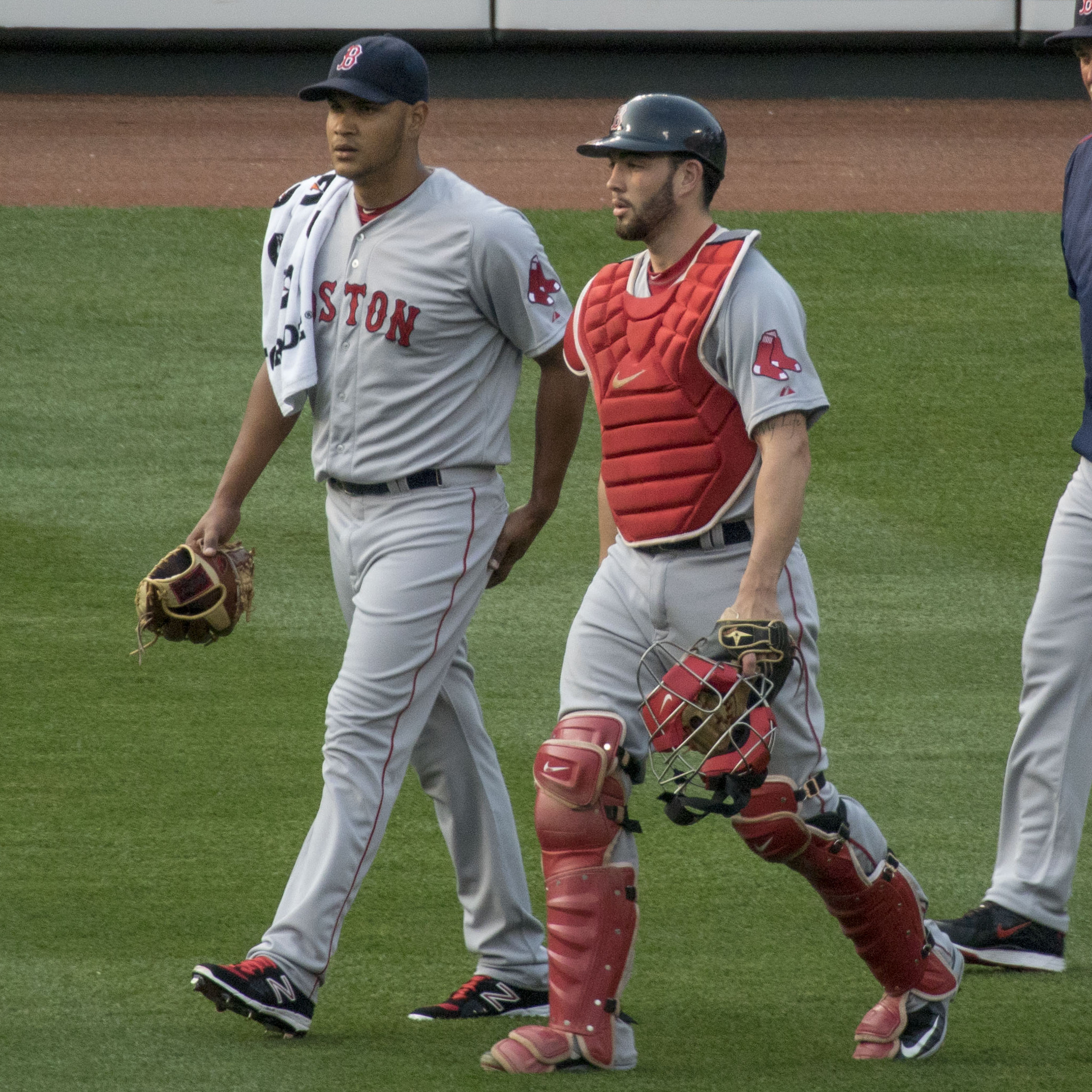
Rodríguez (left) with catcher Blake Swihart in June 2015

On May 28, 2015, Rodríguez earned the win in his MLB debut, tossing 7 2/3 shutout innings in Boston's 5–1 victory over the Texas Rangers at Globe Life Park. Rodríguez allowed just three hits and walked two batters, while striking out seven on 105 pitches, 68 of them for strikes. Already the youngest Red Sox pitcher to make his debut on the road since 21-year-old Roger Clemens faced the Cleveland Indians in 1984, Rodríguez also became the youngest Red Sox starter to win his debut on the road since Billy Rohr in 1967.

His next two starts were on June 3, when he pitched seven innings giving up just one run, and June 9, when he pitched six scoreless innings. Rodríguez became first pitcher since the advent of ERA as an official statistic in 1912 to have begun his major league career with three starts of at least six innings with one or zero earned runs allowed and at least seven strikeouts. In September 2020 he was joined by pitcher Dean Kremer as the only two rookies to—in their first three starts—throw at least five innings, with one or no runs, four or fewer hits, and at least six strikeouts in all three starts.

Overall, with the 2015 Red Sox, Rodríguez appeared in 21 games (all starts), compiling a 10–6 record with 3.85 ERA, while striking out 98 and walking 37 in 121 2/3 innings pitched.

==== 2016 ====
Rodríguez suffered a dislocated kneecap in March 2016. He began the 2016 season on the disabled list, making his first start on May 31, giving up two runs in six innings while getting a win over the Orioles. He struggled in his next five starts, pitching to an 8.59 ERA, before he was optioned to Pawtucket in late June. He was recalled to Boston in mid-July.

For the 2016 Red Sox, Rodríguez appeared in 20 games (all starts), compiling a 3–7 record with 4.71 ERA, while striking out 100 and walking 40 in 107 innings pitched.

==== 2017 ====
Despite a difficult first start of the season—giving up four runs in five innings and taking the loss against the Detroit Tigers on April 8—his ERA was at 3.10 or below for all of May. In early June, he went back on the disabled list, after re-injuring his knee while warming up in the bullpen for a start in Baltimore. He returned to the rotation in mid-July.

During the 2017 Red Sox regular season, Rodríguez appeared in 25 games (24 starts), compiling a 6–7 record with 4.19 ERA, while striking out 150 and walking 50 in 137 1/3 innings pitched.

The 2017 American League Division Series was the first MLB postseason series for Rodríguez. He made a relief appearance in Game 2; facing two batters, he gave up a single and hit a batter—both runners later scored. The Red Sox went on to lose the series to the eventual World Series champions, the Houston Astros.

==== 2018 ====
Rodríguez began the 2018 Boston Red Sox season as a member of the starting rotation. He made five starts in April, compiling a 3–0 record, plus two no decisions. On July 15, he was placed on the disabled list due to a right ankle sprain. At that point in the season, Rodríguez had an 11–3 record with 3.44 ERA in 104 2/3 innings of work spanning 19 starts. On August 20, he was sent on a rehabilitation assignment with the Double-A Portland Sea Dogs. Rodríguez was activated from the disabled list on September 1. With Boston during the regular season, Rodríguez made 27 appearances (23 starts) with a 3.82 ERA and 13–5 record with 146 strikeouts in 129 2/3 innings. In the postseason, Rodríguez made two appearances in the ALDS and two appearances in the ALCS, all in relief, allowing two hits and three runs in 3 2/3 innings. He started Game 4 of the World Series against the Los Angeles Dodgers, pitching 5 2/3 innings while allowing four runs on four hits and two walks with six strikeouts, receiving a no decision as Boston came from behind to win, 9–6. The Red Sox went on to win the series in five games.

==== 2019 ====
Rodríguez returned to the 2019 Red Sox as a starter, making 34 appearances, all starts. From April 24 to September 24, he had a record of 18–4, best in the A.L. He compiled a record of 19–6 with 3.81 ERA while striking out 213 in 203 1/3 innings. While Rodríguez had a chance for a 20-win season, his start for Boston on the final day of the regular season resulted in a no decision. In 2019 Cy Young Award voting for the American League, Rodríguez finished sixth, garnering three fourth-place votes and two fifth-place votes.

==== 2020 ====
On July 7, 2020, it was announced that Rodríguez had tested positive for COVID-19. He was placed on the injured list prior to the delayed start of the 2020 season. In late July, Rodríguez advised that he had been diagnosed with myocarditis, a heart condition typically caused by a viral infection, such as COVID-19. On August 1, the Red Sox announced Rodríguez would not pitch in 2020 in order to recover from his ongoing health problems.

==== 2021 ====
On December 1, 2020, Rodríguez and the Red Sox reached a one-year deal for the 2021 season, reportedly worth $8.3 million. He made his first start in over a year on April 8, 2021, registering a win against Baltimore. On July 23, Rodríguez exited a start against the New York Yankees in the second inning due to migraine symptoms. Overall during the regular season, Rodríguez appeared in 32 games (31 starts) for Boston, compiling a 13–8 record with 4.74 ERA while striking out 185 batters in 157 2/3 innings. He then made three starts in the postseason, pitching to a 1–1 record while allowing seven runs in 12 2/3 innings as the Red Sox advanced to the American League Championship Series. On November 3, Rodríguez elected to become a free agent. On November 7, the Red Sox issued Rodríguez a qualifying offer; he had a 10-day window to accept a one-year contract for $18.4 million, agree to other contract terms with the team, or remain a free agent. Rodríguez rejected the qualifying offer.

=== Detroit Tigers ===
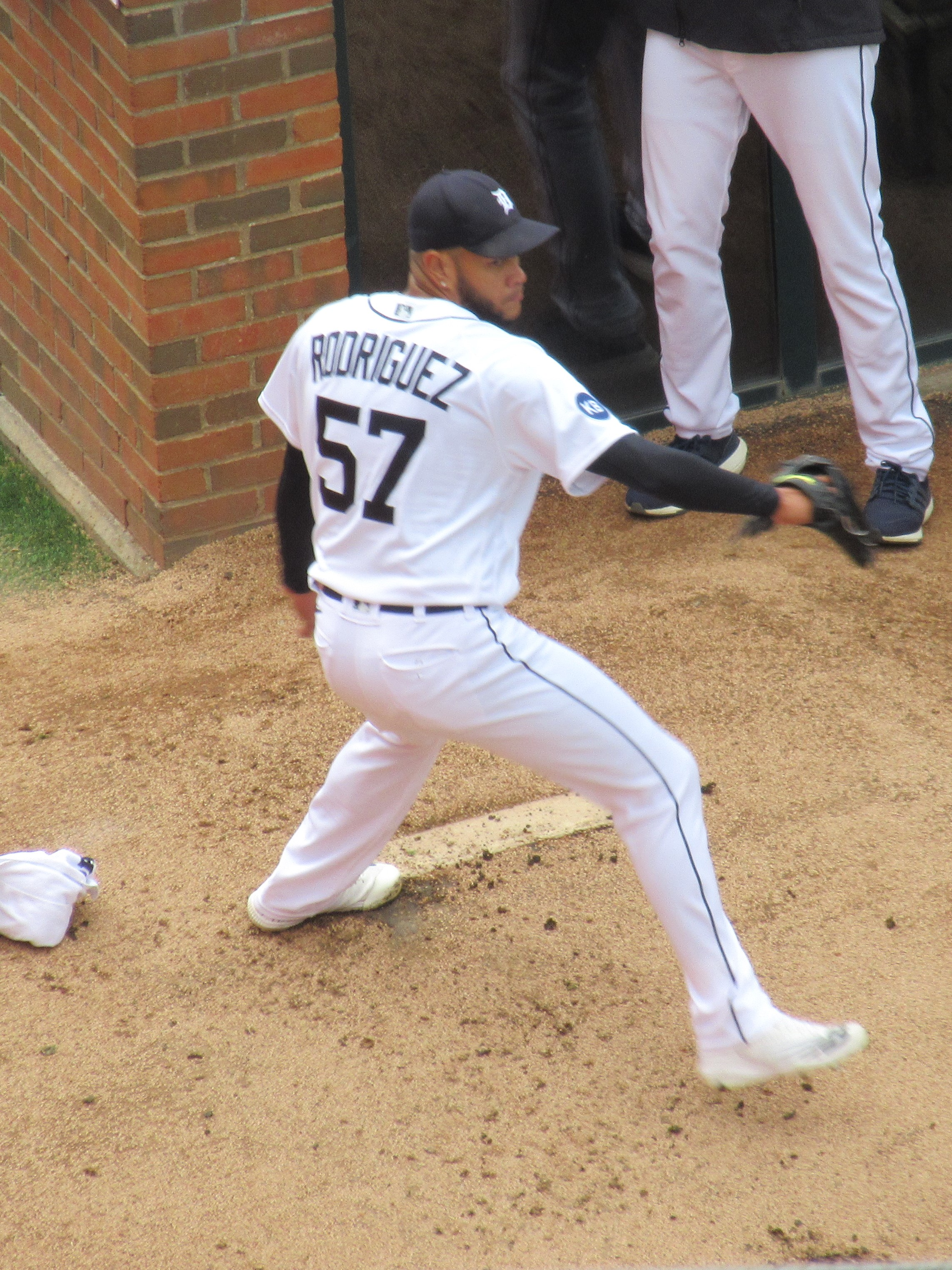
Rodríguez warming up before his start against the Kansas City Royals on September 29, 2022

On November 15, 2021, Rodríguez signed a five-year, $77 million contract with the Detroit Tigers. The deal included an opt-out clause that Rodríguez could exercise after the 2023 season.

==== 2022 ====
Tigers manager A. J. Hinch announced that Rodríguez would start the 2022 Opening Day game for the Tigers on April 8. He allowed three runs on four hits in four innings and received a no decision, as the Tigers scored twice in the bottom of the ninth for a 5–4 win. During his start of May 18, Rodriguez suffered a left ribcage sprain and was subsequently placed on the injured list. He remained on the injured list until June 13 when the Tigers placed him on the restricted list, due to personal matters, until further notice.

His stint on the restrictive list was largely unexplained and attributed to personal family matters, in which he was not paid and removed from the active 40-man roster. During that period, Rodríguez was incommunicado with the team for an extended period, leading to questions about whether or not he would return at all that season, and also leading to questions about the team perhaps trying to void his contract. Rodríguez's absence was later reported as being related to a marital issue.

Rodríguez returned in late July and was sent to the Triple-A Toledo Mud Hens for a rehab assignment before being reactivated from the restricted list. He made his return to the Tigers on August 21 in a winning effort against the Los Angeles Angels.

==== 2023 ====
Rodríguez began the 2023 season strong before a finger injury cost him the entire month of June. At the end of July he sported a 6–5 record, with an ERA of 2.95. On August 1, the Tigers reportedly agreed to trade Rodríguez to the Los Angeles Dodgers. However, Rodríguez exercised his no-trade clause in his contract to block the move, citing family reasons. For the 2023 season, Rodríguez made 26 starts, posting a 13–9 record, 3.30 ERA, 1.153 WHIP, and 143 strikeouts in 152 2/3 innings. On November 4, he opted-out of the final three years of his contract and became a free agent.

=== Arizona Diamondbacks ===
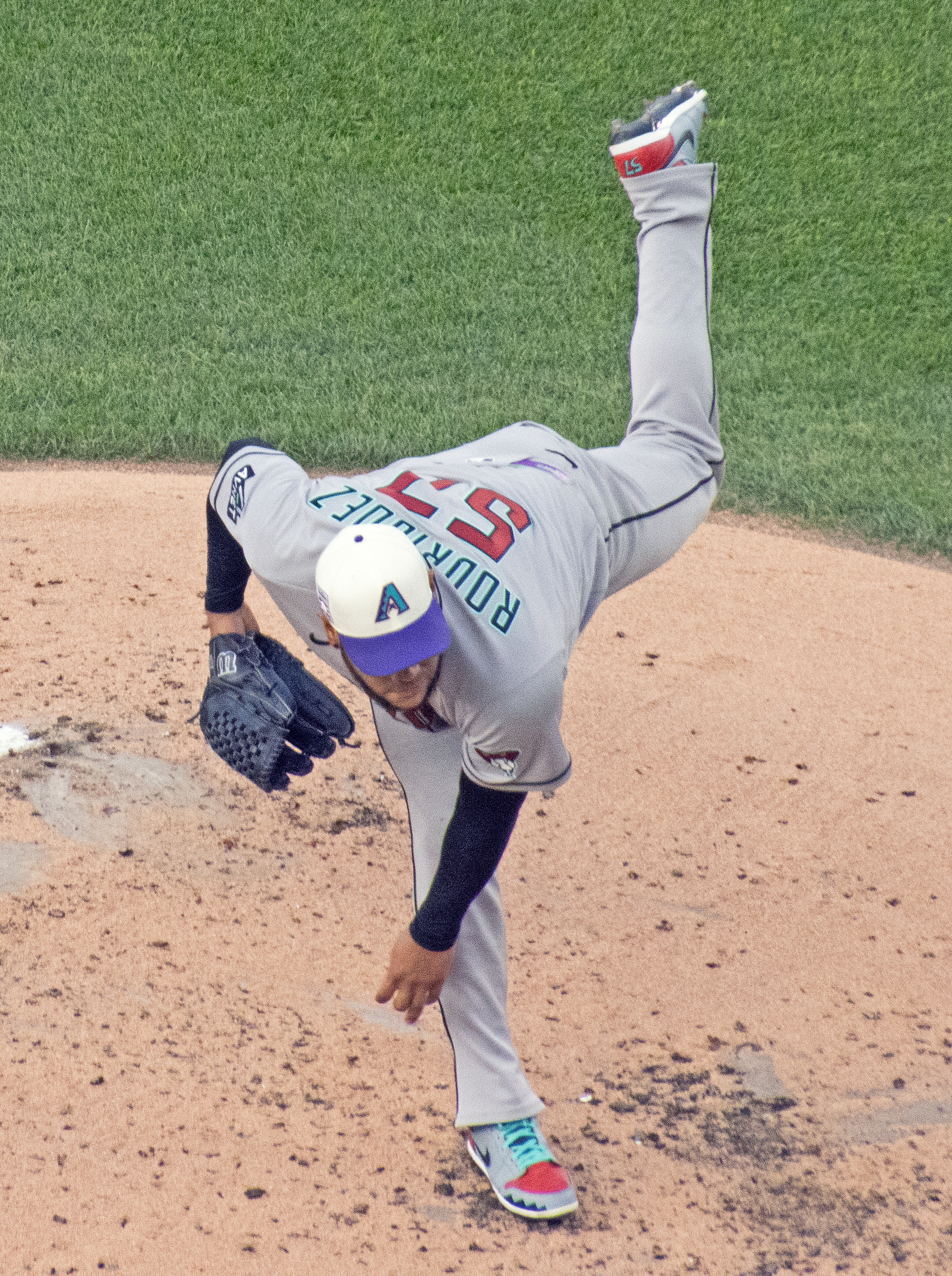
Rodríguez with the Arizona Diamondbacks in 2026

On December 8, 2023, Rodríguez signed a four-year, $80 million, contract with the Arizona Diamondbacks. He was placed on the injured list with a left shoulder strain to begin the season. After experiencing renewed shoulder discomfort during a throwing session, Rodríguez was transferred to the 60-day injured list on April 17, 2024. He was activated on August 6. He made his Diamondback debut the next day against the Cleveland Guardians, allowing three runs on four hits across 5 2/3 innings in a 5–3 victory. Rodríguez finished his first season in Arizona with a 5.04 ERA, a 1.50 WHIP, and 47 strikeouts over 50 innings across 10 starts. In 2025, he posted a 5.01 ERA over 29 starts.

On June 17, 2026, Rodríguez recorded his 100th career win in an 8–1 victory over the Los Angeles Angels. He started 32 total contests for Arizona during the regular season, compiling a 16–7 record and 2.89 ERA with 143 strikeouts across 189 2/3 innings pitched.

== Pitching style ==
Rodríguez is naturally right-handed. He began to throw with his left arm when he broke his right arm at the age of seven. He throws a fastball that ranges between 90 and 94 miles per hour (145 and 151 km/h). He also throws a changeup that ranges from 83 to 85 miles per hour (134 to 137 km/h), and a slider that he throws between 82 and 85 miles per hour (132 and 137 km/h). Following the trade to the Red Sox, Rodriguez worked with Bob Kipper, Portland's pitching coach, to help him improve his changeup.

== Personal life ==
Rodriguez is the third of four children. His father works in construction. He played baseball, soccer, and basketball in his youth.

He tattooed his mother's name, Magales, on his left forearm in 2011. He also tattooed his surname on his back.

Rodriguez and his wife Catherine have a daughter, Annie, and a son, Ian.

== See also ==
- List of Major League Baseball players from Venezuela
