= Steve Pearce (baseball) =

American baseball player (born 1983)

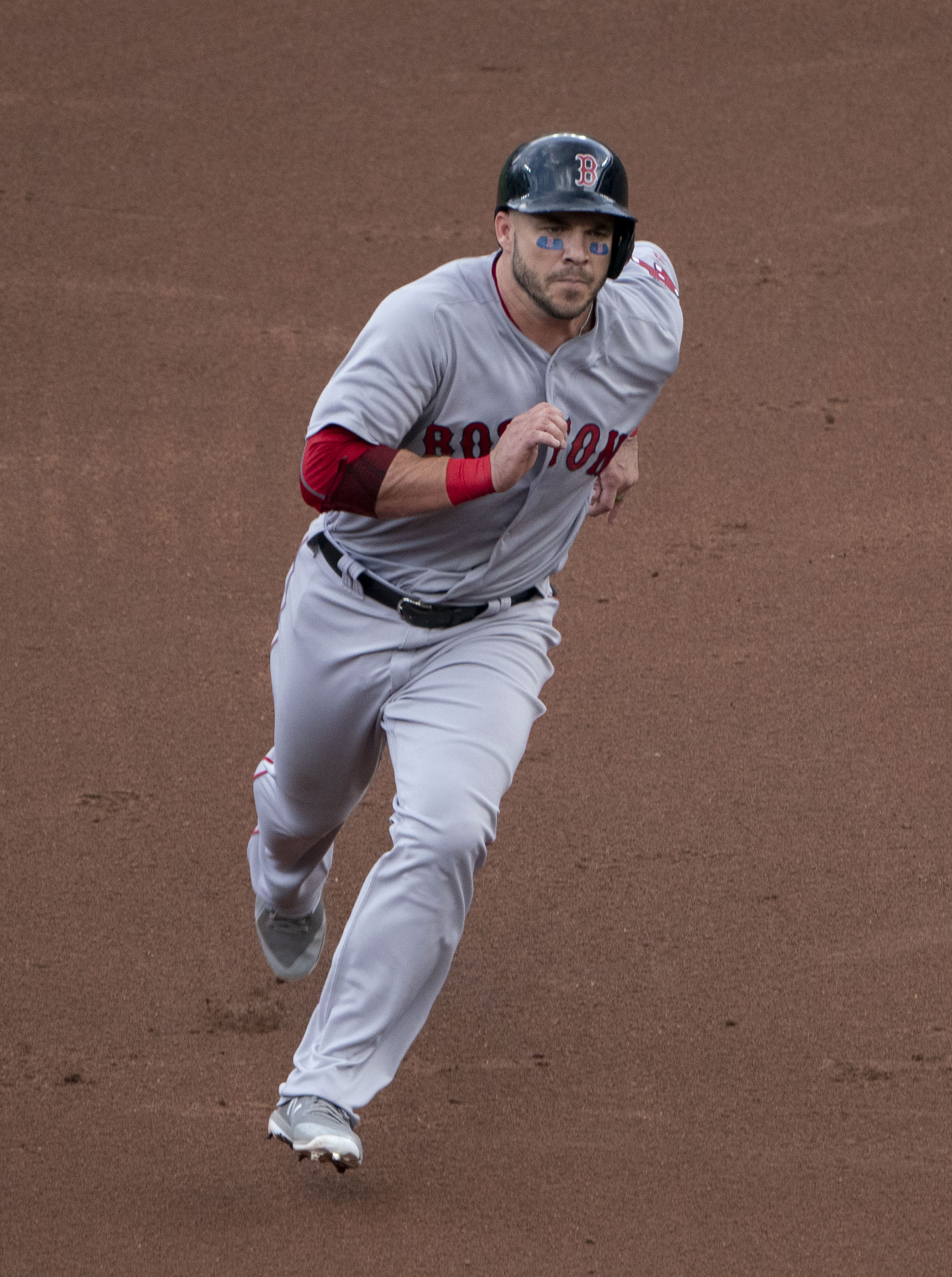
- Pearce with the Boston Red Sox in 2018
- Outfielder / First baseman
- Born: April 13, 1983 (age 43); Lakeland, Florida, U.S.
- Batted: Right Threw: Right

MLB debut
- September 1, 2007, for the Pittsburgh Pirates

Last MLB appearance
- May 31, 2019, for the Boston Red Sox

MLB statistics
- Batting average: .254
- Home runs: 91
- Runs batted in: 303
- Stats at Baseball Reference

Teams
- Pittsburgh Pirates (2007–2011); Baltimore Orioles (2012); Houston Astros (2012); New York Yankees (2012); Baltimore Orioles (2013–2015); Tampa Bay Rays (2016); Baltimore Orioles (2016); Toronto Blue Jays (2017–2018); Boston Red Sox (2018–2019)

Career highlights and awards
- World Series champion (2018); World Series MVP (2018)
Medals
Men's baseball
Representing United States
Baseball World Cup
Gold medal – first place	2007 Tianmu	Team

Steven Wayne Pearce (born April 13, 1983) is an American former professional baseball left fielder and first baseman. He played in Major League Baseball (MLB) for the Pittsburgh Pirates, Baltimore Orioles, Houston Astros, New York Yankees, Tampa Bay Rays, Toronto Blue Jays and Boston Red Sox. Pearce is only the second player in MLB history to have played for every team in the American League East, the first being Kelly Johnson. He is also the first and only player to have hit two walk-off grand slams in the span of a single week.

Pearce was instrumental in Boston's 2018 World Series triumph over the Los Angeles Dodgers, displaying key outbursts of power en route to being named the World Series Most Valuable Player.

== Amateur career ==
Pearce graduated in 2001 from Lakeland High School in Lakeland, Florida, where he was a three-year letterman in baseball and posted a career .383 batting average. Pearce's father, also named Steve, was born in Rehoboth, Massachusetts, south of Boston. As a result, Pearce became a fan of the Boston Red Sox growing up, a team he would eventually play for. “I was brainwashed as a kid. Had no choice.”

Pearce played two seasons (2002–2003) at Indian River Community College in Fort Pierce, Florida, leading Indian River in batting average both seasons and hitting a total of 17 home runs. Pearce was inducted to the Indian River Pioneer Athletic Hall of Fame on April 16, 2015.

Pearce was selected twice in the MLB draft, but did not sign; in the 45th round in the 2003 MLB draft by the Minnesota Twins, and in the 10th round in the 2004 MLB draft by the Boston Red Sox.

Pearce played for the Cotuit Kettleers of the Cape Cod Baseball League in the summer of 2004, hitting .277 with one home run and seven RBIs in 24 games.

Pearce transferred to the University of South Carolina and led the team in batting average, home runs and RBIs in 2004 and 2005, hitting 42 home runs in his two seasons with the Gamecocks, to become the first player in school history to reach the 40-homer plateau that quickly. As a transfer junior in 2004, he hit .346 with 21 home runs and 70 RBI, helping to lead the Gamecocks to their third consecutive appearance in the College World Series. Pearce was named the team's Rookie of the Year and was selected to both the NCAA Regional All-Tournament Team and the College World Series All-Tournament Team. He set a South Carolina school record with a 1.000 fielding percentage (416 putouts, 22 assists, 0 errors) in 50 games at first base. Pearce was named to the watch lists for both the Golden Spikes Award (USA Baseball's top amateur baseball player) and the Dick Howser Trophy (top collegiate baseball player) prior to the 2005 season. As a senior in 2005, he hit .358 with 21 home runs and 63 RBIs, and was a Second-Team All-SEC selection, a Baseball America Second-Team All-American and the NCBWA District IV Player of the Year.

== Professional career ==
=== Pittsburgh Pirates ===
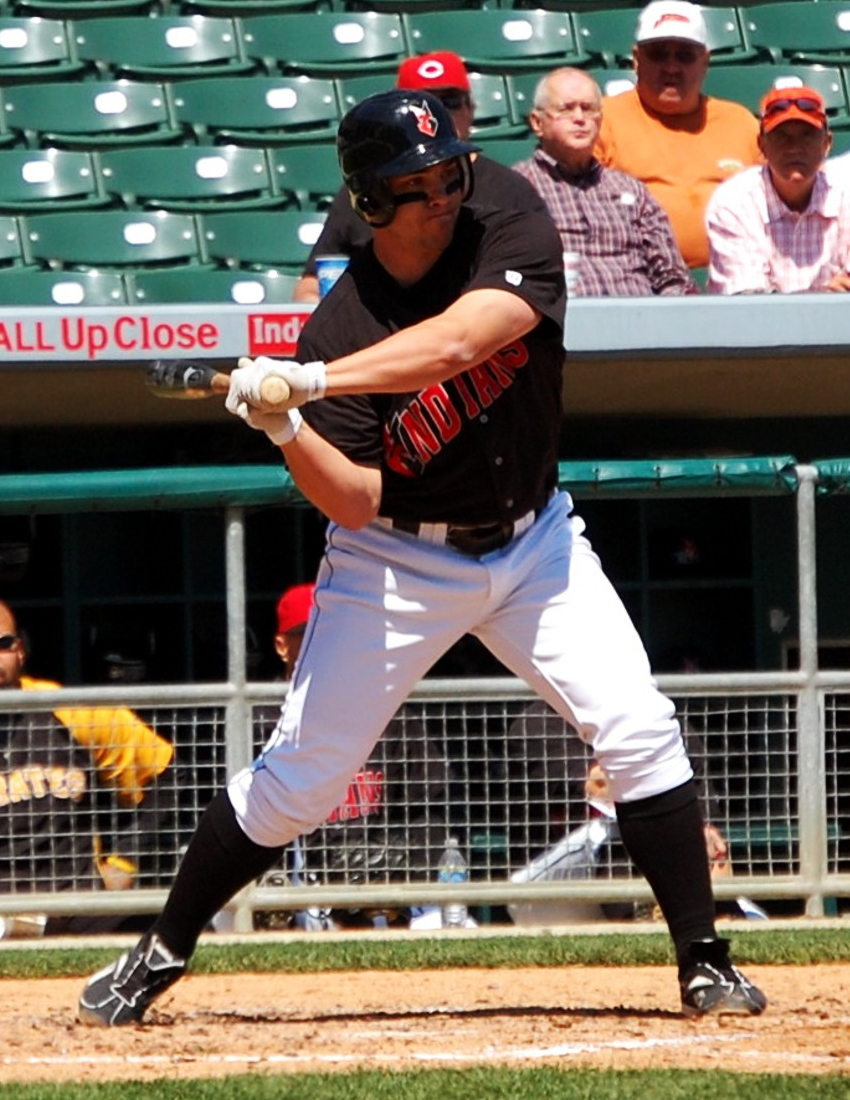
Pearce with the Indianapolis Indians in 2009

The Pittsburgh Pirates selected Pearce in the eighth round of the 2005 MLB draft.

In 2005, Pearce played for the Class A Short Season Williamsport Crosscutters, batting .301 with seven home runs and 52 RBIs in 72 games.

In 2006, he then spent with the Class A Hickory Crawdads and the Class A-Advanced Lynchburg Hillcats, batting a combined .273 with 26 home runs and 98 RBIs in 131 games played.

In 2007, he began the season with Lynchburg, then move on to the Double-A Altoona Curve, and the Triple-A Indianapolis Indians. During his 2007 run in the minors, Pearce had 31 home runs, 113 RBIs, and a .333 average in 134 games played. On September 1, 2007, he made his MLB debut for the Pirates, against the Milwaukee Brewers, starting in right field and going 2-for-4 at the plate where both of his hits were off Dave Bush. He would go on to play 23 games with the 2007 Pirates, batting .294 with six RBIs.

In 2008, Pearce spent the majority of the year with Triple-A Indianapolis, but made several appearances for the Pirates. On September 2, he was recalled again when the roster expanded. With the 2008 Pirates, Pearce batted .248 with four home runs and 15 RBIs in 37 games played.

In 2009, Pearce failed to make the Pirates opening day roster after spring training, and began the year in Triple-A. With the recent addition of outfield prospects in the organization, Pearce was moved back to playing first base. He was recalled on June 20. Pearce joined the Pirates on July 23 to become the starting first baseman following the trade of Adam LaRoche. He ended a poor season for the 2009 Pirates with a slash line of .206/.296/.370 in 60 games played, with four home runs and 16 RBIs. He also had 13 doubles, one triple, and one stolen base.

Pearce started the 2010 season with the Indianapolis Indians, but was eventually called up by the Pirates due to his .345 batting average in Triple-A. With the 2010 Pirates, Pearce played in 15 games, batting 8-for-29 (.276) with five RBIs.

The 2011 season marked the first time that Pearce won a roster spot out of spring training, as he'd never spent Opening Day in MLB. He had a .283 batting average during spring training with five doubles among his 13 hits. More importantly, he increased his versatility by working at two new positions, third base and left field. He was with the Pirates through late May, then from late July through late August. With the 2011 Pirates, Pearce had 50 games played, batting 19-for-94 (.202) with one home run and 10 RBIs.

Overall, in parts of five seasons with the Pirates, Pearce appeared in 185 games, batting .232 with nine home runs and 52 RBIs.

Minnesota Twins (minors)

On December 15, 2011, Pearce signed a minor league contract with the Minnesota Twins. The Twins released him on March 27, 2012.

New York Yankees (minors)

Pearce signed with the New York Yankees on March 29, 2012. He played for the Triple-A Scranton/Wilkes-Barre Yankees, batting .318 in 53 games with 11 home runs and 30 RBIs.

=== Baltimore Orioles ===
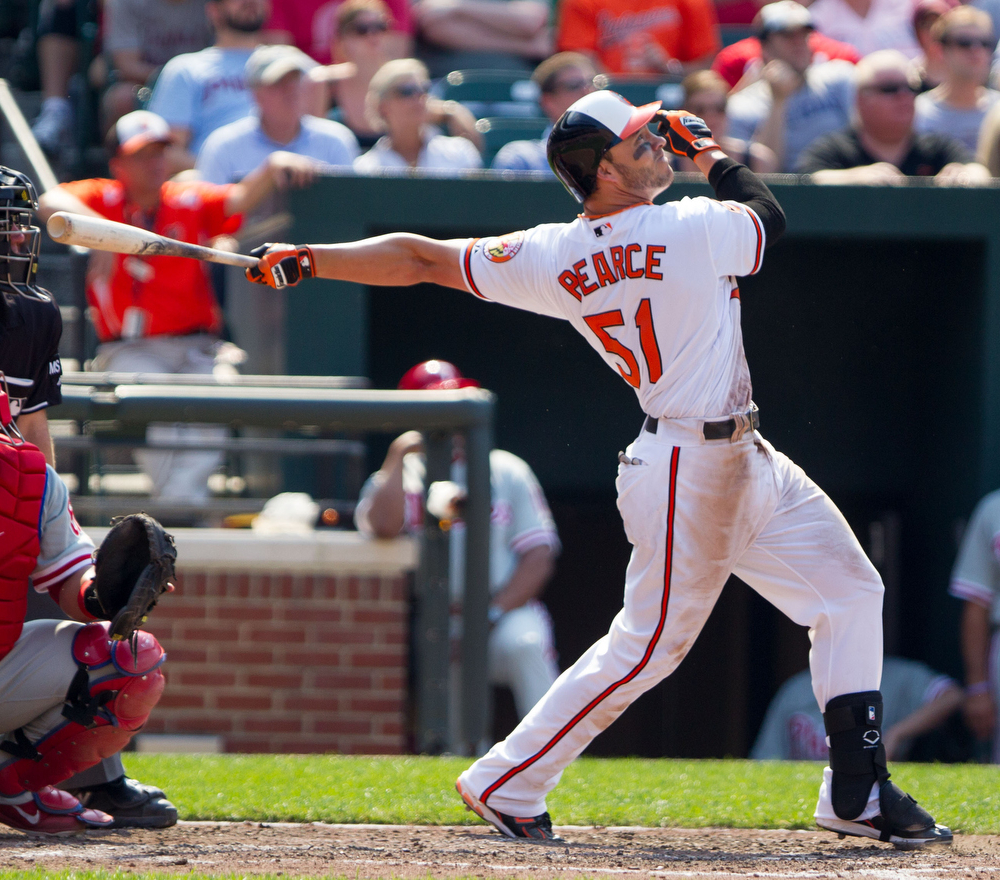
Pearce batting for the Baltimore Orioles in 2012

On June 2, 2012, the Yankees sold Pearce to the Baltimore Orioles. He made his debut against the Tampa Bay Rays the following day, starting in right field and batting eighth. On June 14, he hit his first home run with the Orioles and recorded five RBIs. He and teammate Matt Wieters became the first pair of Orioles to both record five RBIs in the same game since Cal Ripken Jr. and Will Clark did it in 1999 at Turner Field against the Atlanta Braves. Pearce was designated for assignment on July 21. While with the 2012 Orioles, Pearce appeared in 28 games, batting .254 (18-for-71) with three home runs and 14 RBIs.

=== Houston Astros ===
On July 28, 2012, the Houston Astros claimed Pearce from the Baltimore Orioles. Pearce appeared in 21 games for the 2012 Astros, batting 16-for-63 (.254) with eight RBIs.

=== New York Yankees ===
On August 27, 2012, the New York Yankees acquired Pearce again. buying him from the Astros. Pearce appeared in 12 games with the 2012 Yankees, batting 4-for-25 (.160) with one home run and four RBIs. On September 25, 2012, the Yankees designated Pearce for assignment in order to make room on the roster to activate outfielder Brett Gardner from the 60-day disabled list.

Overall for the 2012 season, Pearce appeared in 61 MLB games, batting .239 with four home runs and 26 RBIs.

=== Second stint with the Orioles ===
Pearce was claimed off waivers by the Orioles on September 29, 2012.

Pearce played in 44 games for Baltimore in 2013, hitting .261 with 4 home runs and 13 RBI.

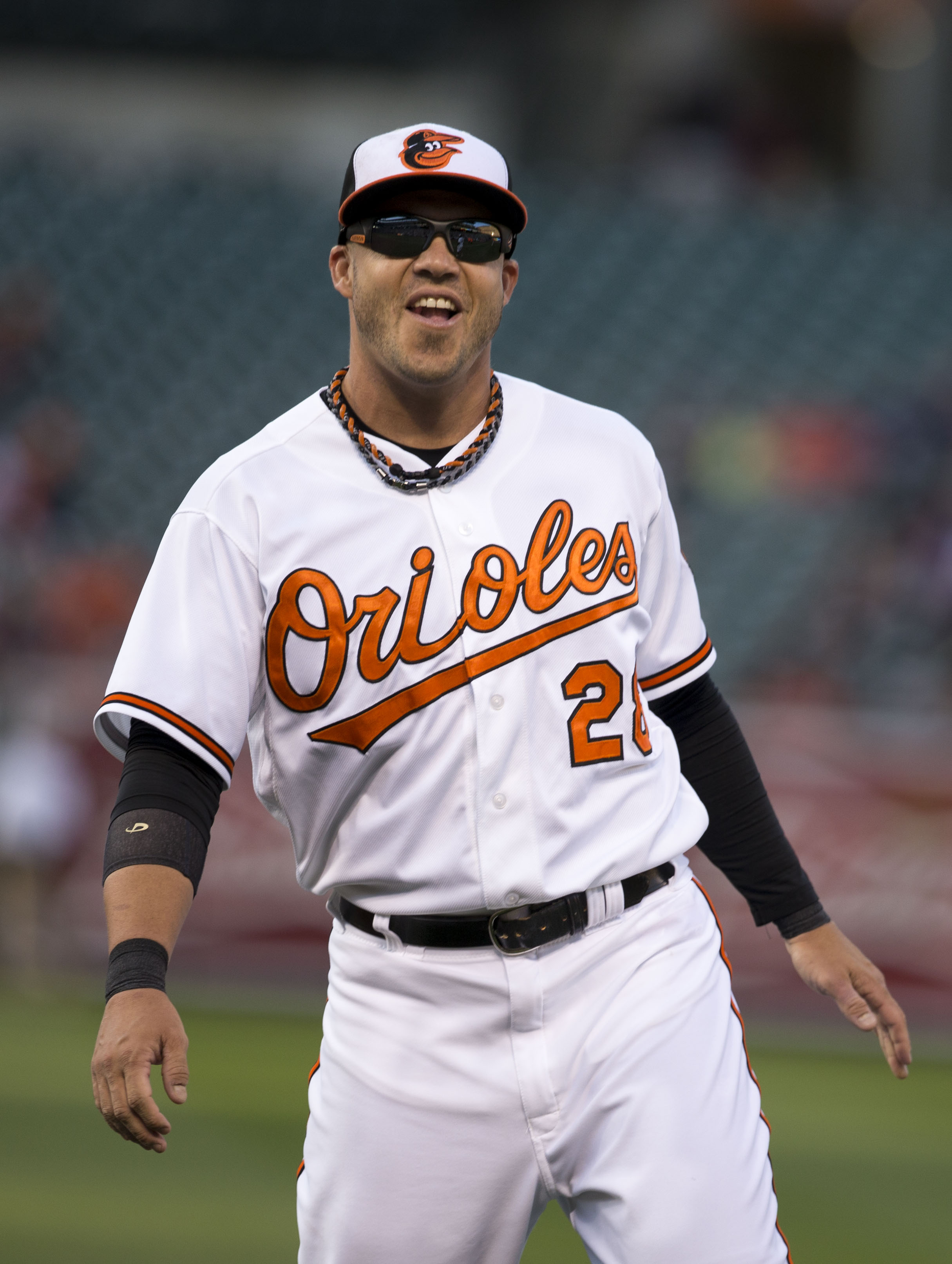
Pearce with the Orioles in 2015

Pearce re-signed with Baltimore on a one-year deal worth $850,000 for the 2014 season. On March 29, 2014, it was announced that Pearce had made the Opening Day roster for the Orioles. He was designated for assignment on April 22, and was released on April 27. He re-signed on April 29. On May 6, Pearce hit his first home run of the season in a 5–3 Orioles victory over the Tampa Rays. Pearce hit his second home run of the season two nights later to help sweep the series on the road against the Rays. Pearce continued his hot streak the following night hitting his third home run of the year in the Orioles 4–3 victory over the Houston Astros. He and teammate Adam Jones were named co-AL Players of the Week for the week ending on July 6. Pearce had an extremely successful 2014 season, setting career-highs in home runs (21), RBIs (49), runs scored (51), batting average (.293), and doubles (26).

Pearce received a significant upgrade in salary for the 2015 season; settling on a salary of $3.7 million with the Orioles, well above the $700,000 he had made the previous season. His 2015 season was not as successful as his 2014 season, while he did hit 15 home runs he ended the year with a batting average of .218 and an on base percentage of .289 over 92 games and 325 plate appearances.

=== Tampa Bay Rays ===
On January 28, 2016, Pearce signed a one-year contract worth $4.75 million with the Tampa Bay Rays. The deal also had up to $1.25 million in bonuses for plate appearances, as well as a $250,000 bonus if he was traded by the Rays. Throughout his stint with Tampa Bay, Pearce was utilized as the designated hitter for the team but also played first base, second, and third at times. In 60 games, he hit .309 with 10 home runs.

=== Third stint with the Orioles ===
On August 1, 2016, the Rays traded Pearce to the Orioles for Jonah Heim. With the 2016 Orioles, Pearce appeared in 25 games, batting 13-for-60 (.217) with three home runs and six RBIs.

=== Toronto Blue Jays ===
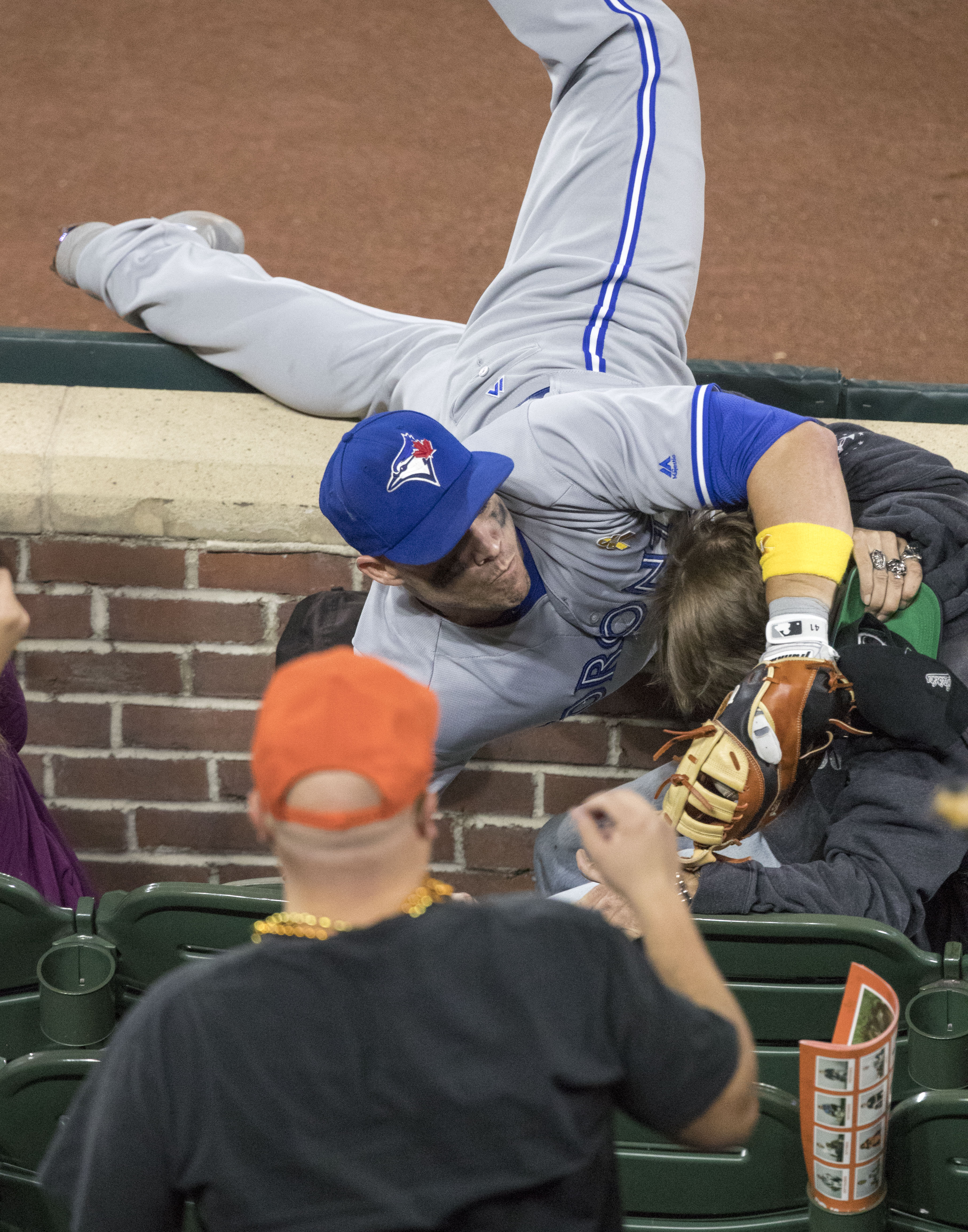
Pearce with the Blue Jays in a game at Camden Yards

On December 5, 2016, Pearce signed a two-year, $12.5 million contract with the Toronto Blue Jays. Pearce and Kendrys Morales were meant to be a replacement for departed star Edwin Encarnacion.

On May 14, 2017, Pearce suffered a strained calf while sliding into second base during a game against the Seattle Mariners; forcing him to leave the game and subsequently be placed on the disabled list. He returned to the lineup on June 16 and hit a home run against the Chicago White Sox. Pearce hit the third walk-off grand slam in franchise history on July 27, lifting the Blue Jays to an 8–4 victory and a four-game sweep of the Oakland Athletics. Three days later, he hit another walk-off grand slam, giving the Blue Jays an 11–10 win over the Los Angeles Angels. In doing so, Pearce became the 29th player in MLB history to hit an ultimate grand slam, and the third player to hit two walk-off grand slams in a season, joining Cy Williams and Jim Presley, who did so in 1926 and 1986 respectively. Pearce also became the first player in MLB history to hit multiple walk-off grand slams within the span of a single week. With the 2017 Blue Jays, Pearce batted .252 in 92 games, with 13 home runs and 37 RBIs.

With the 2018 Blue Jays, Pearce appeared in 26 games through June 27, batting .291 (23-for-79) with four home runs and 16 RBIs.

=== Boston Red Sox ===
On June 28, 2018, Pearce was traded to the Boston Red Sox for minor league infielder Santiago Espinal and $1.5M. In his MLB career, Pearce has now played for all five teams in the American League East division. The next day, Pearce went 2-for-4 in his debut game with Boston, an 8–1 loss to the rival Yankees. On August 2, in a game against the Yankees, Pearce hit three home runs and led the Red Sox in a 15–7 rout at Fenway Park. He became just the sixth player to hit three home runs in a Red Sox–Yankees game. After the game, Pearce was called the best acquisition the Red Sox made during the 2018 season. During the regular season, Pearce batted .279 for the Red Sox, with seven home runs and 26 RBIs in 50 games played.

After an injury to regular first baseman Mitch Moreland in Game 2 of the American League Division Series, Pearce became the everyday first baseman for the Red Sox in the playoffs. On October 16, in Game 3 of the American League Championship Series, Pearce hit a go-ahead home run off Joe Smith in the sixth inning at Minute Maid Park in a game the Red Sox eventually won, 8–2.

In the 2018 World Series against the Los Angeles Dodgers, Pearce hit a game-tying solo home run off of Dodgers closer Kenley Jansen in the top of the eighth inning of Game 4. In the next inning, Pearce came up with the bases loaded and hit a base–clearing double, putting the Red Sox up 8–4 in a game they would go on to win 9–6. In Game 5, Pearce hit a two-run home run in the first inning off of former Cy Young Award winner Clayton Kershaw, and added a second home run in the eighth inning off Pedro Báez to extend the lead to 5–1. The Red Sox would go on to win the game and the series, giving Pearce his first World Series ring. He became the first Red Sox player to hit three home runs in the World Series since Carl Yastrzemski in 1967, and in three fewer games. He joined Babe Ruth and Ted Kluszewski as the only players 35 or older to have a multi-home run game in the World Series. Pearce was named World Series MVP.

On November 16, 2018, Pearce re-signed for one year and $6.25 million. He was placed on the 10-day injured list prior to Opening Day of 2019, due to a left calf injury, then activated on April 4. Pearce batted .180 in 29 games through June 1, when he was placed on the injured list due to a low back strain. He was sent on a rehabilitation assignment with the Lowell Spinners on June 14, and with the Pawtucket Red Sox on June 18. His rehabilitation assignment was stopped by the team on July 1, for what was later described as a posterior ligament injury to his knee. Pearce was moved to the 60-day injured list on August 11, and did not play again during the season, finishing with one home run and nine RBIs in the 29 games he appeared in. He became a free agent on October 31.

Pearce announced his retirement on April 13, 2020.

== Personal life ==
Pearce and his wife, Jessica, have a son and a daughter together.

== See also ==
- List of Major League Baseball ultimate grand slams
