= Boston Children's Chorus =

Children's choir group in Boston, Massachusetts

- Also known as: BCC
- Origin: Boston
- Years active: 2003-
- Members: 300+
- Website: www.bostonchildrenschorus.org

Boston Children's Chorus (BCC) is composed of over 300 singers from 11 choirs in over six locations around Boston. Founded in 2003, BCC has performed all over the world in countries such as Japan, Mexico, Australia, Cambodia, Vietnam, Jordan, the Czech Republic, Germany and the United Kingdom. In addition, BCC has received critical acclaim for its music and hosts Boston's Martin Luther King Jr. annual celebration at Symphony Hall, Boston. This concert has featured guests such as Louis Gossett Jr., Patti Austin, Melinda Doolittle, Cindy Blackman Santana, Leslie Odom Jr., Dom Flemons and Roomful of Teeth and has been televised nationally.

== Founding ==
BCC was founded by Boston civic leader, Hubie Jones. In 2001, Jones experienced a performance by the nationally renowned Chicago Children's Choir, and returned to Boston determined to replicate the program, as there were no organizations in Boston that effectively combined a mission for artistic excellence with an agenda for social change. He gathered the support of civic leaders and, after a year of planning and pilot projects, the Boston Children's Chorus was launched in October 2003.

== Growth ==
Since BCC's inception, the programs have grown rapidly. In 2003 under the leadership of Founding Artistic Director Darren Dailey, sixty-five (65) children were accepted into the initial pilot program. Over 300 singers represent over 100 different zip codes from Greater Boston's urban and suburban neighborhoods. The program spans eleven different choirs in eight Boston locations: Dorchester, East Boston, Jamaica Plain, South End, Roxbury, Allston/Brighton, and Hyde Park.

The 2012–2013 season represented 10 Years of Harmony for the organization, during which the chorus had its biggest sell-out concert at its winter concert at the Cathedral of the Holy Cross.

In April 2013, the State of Massachusetts called on BCC to aid in the healing process of Boston in the wake of the tragic events at the Boston Marathon of 2013. The chorus joined with President Barack Obama, first responders and others as they sang to a national audience at the Interfaith Service in Boston's South End. In 2014, BCC performed at the Boston Marathon anniversary observances on April 15 in Boston.

The 2013 season ended with a World Premiere performance of "A Boy Called King" at the Institute of Contemporary Art by composer Daniel Bernard Roumain, and a tours Southeast Asia.

The 2018-2018 season was the 15th anniversary of the chorus and had all choirs perform in their famous MLK concert at Symphony Hall, Boston.

== Leadership ==
Darren Dailey was the Founding Artistic Director from 2003-2006. Darren is a graduate of Westminster Choir College in Princeton, NJ, where he earned a Bachelor's in Music Education(voice) and Appalachian State University, where he completed his Master's in Choral Directing.

Anthony Trecek-King served BCC as Artistic Director from 2006-2015. The BCC Board of Directors appointed him as President and Artistic Director and the leader of the organization in 2015. He led the BCC as President and Artistic Director until his departure in 2020. Anthony is a graduate of University of Nebraska at Omaha, where he earned a Bachelor's in Cello Performance and Florida State University, where he completed his Master's in Orchestral Conducting. In 2015 he received his Doctorate in Choral Conducting from Boston University.

Kenneth Griffith was named BCC's Music Director in 2023. Kenneth holds a Bachelor's in Vocal Performance from Capital University and a Master's in Choral Conducting from Bard College.

== Musical program ==
BCC's 300 singers comprise 11 choirs in six different locations. In addition to the 6-8 self-produced concerts in venues such as Boston Symphony Hall, Isabella Stewart Gardner Museum, and the Institute for Contemporary Art/Boston, BCC also tours internationally and has performed in Japan, Mexico, Australia, Cambodia, Vietnam, Germany, England, Jordan, and Australia. BCC has also appeared on National Public Radio's From the Top.

The organization and its singers, called Ambassadors of Harmony by the Boston Globe., have garnered critical acclaim. BCC is a 2011 recipient of the Margaret Hillis Award by Chorus America, recognizing BCC for artistic and organizational excellence and a commitment to outreach, education, and/or culturally diverse activities. The organization was chosen as a 2011, 2012, 2013 National Arts and Humanities Youth Program Award. Finalist by the President's Committee on the Arts and Humanities.

In 2013, BCC was awarded the National Arts and Humanities Youth Program Awards by First Lady Michelle Obama for its exemplary after school youth arts program.

In 2020, it was announced that the album Fantastic Mr. Fox won a Grammy for Best Opera Recording. This recording featured the acclaimed Boston Modern Orchestra Project in collaboration with Odyssey Opera and Boston Children’s Chorus, under the baton of Gil Rose.

The 11 choirs are:

Training Level

- Jamaica Plain Training
- Chelsea Training
- Brighton Training
- Hyde Park Training
- Dorchester Advanced Training

Intermediate Level

- Dorchester Intermediate
- Dorchester Intermediate Advanced

Upper Choir Level

- Recital Choir
- Concert Choir
- Premier Choir (Upper Voices)
- Premier Choir (Lower Voices)
