= List of Sigma Zeta chapters =

Sigma Zeta is an international honor society for the natural sciences, computer science, and mathematics. It was founded in 1925 at the now defunct Shurtleff College. The society has regular chapters at baccalaureate institutions and association chapters at junior colleges.

In the following Sigma Zeta chapter list, active chapters are indicated in bold and inactive chapters and institutions in italics.

| Chapter | Charter date and range | Institution | Location | Status | Ref. |
|---|---|---|---|---|---|
| Alpha | 1925–1957 | Shurtleff College | Alton, Illinois | Inactive | (Note: Chapter went inactive when the college closed.) |
| **Beta** | 1926 | McKendree University | Lebanon, Illinois | Active | |
| Gamma | 1927–xxxx ? | Medical College of Virginia | Richmond, Virginia | Inactive | |
| Delta | 1927–xxxx ? | Northwest Missouri State University | Kirksville, Missouri | Inactive | (Note: Chapter formed at Northeast Missouri State Teachers College, now Northeast Missouri State.) |
| Epsilon | 1929–xxxx ? | Otterbein College | Westerville, Ohio | Inactive | |
| Zeta | 1929–xxxx ? | University of Wisconsin–Stevens Point | Stevens Point, Wisconsin | Inactive | (Note: Chapter formed at Central State Teachers College, now Wisconsin State, Stevens Point.) |
| Eta | 1932–1948 | Southwest Missouri State College | Cape Girardeau, Missouri | Inactive | (Note: Chapter started at Southeast Missouri State Teachers College, now Southwest Missouri State.) |
| Theta | 1932–1939 | Elizabethtown College | Elizabethtown, Pennsylvania | Inactive | |
| Iota | | Indiana State Teachers College | Terre Haute, Indiana | Inactive | (Note: Chapter failed to organize and was never chartered.) |
| Kappa | 1935–xxxx ? | Western Illinois State Teachers College | Macomb, Illinois | Inactive | |
| Lambda | 1936–xxxx ? | Mansfield State Teachers College | Mansfield, Pennsylvania | Inactive | |
| Mu | 1937–xxxx ? | Minnesota State University, Mankato | Mankato, Minnesota | Inactive | |
| Nu | 1937–xxxx ? | Northern Illinois State Teachers College | DeKalb, Illinois | Inactive | |
| Xi | 1938–xxxx ? | Ball State University | Muncie, Indiana | Inactive | |
| Omicron | 1939–1958 | District of Columbia Teachers College | Washington, D.C. | Inactive | (Note: Chapter formed at Wilson Teachers College which merged to become the District of Columbia Teachers College in 1955.) |
| **Pi** | 1943 | Millikin University | Decatur, Illinois | Active | |
| **Rho** | 1943 | University of Indianapolis | Indianapolis, Indiana | Active | |
| **Sigma** | 1944 | Our Lady of the Lake University | San Antonio, Texas | Active | |
| Tau | 1947–xxxx ? | East Stroudsburg University of Pennsylvania | East Stroudsburg, Pennsylvania | Inactive | |
| **Upsilon** | 1948 | Anderson University | Anderson, Indiana | Active | |
| **Phi** | 1948 | Eureka College | Eureka, Illinois | Active | |
| Chi | 1951–xxxx ? | Missouri Valley College | Marshall, Missouri | Inactive | |
| Psi | 1956–xxxx ? | Central Missouri State University | Warrensburg, Missouri | Inactive | |
| Omega | 1961–xxxx ? | Frostburg State College | Frostburg, Maryland | Inactive | (Note: Chapter formed at Frostburg State Teachers College, which became Frostburg State College in 1963.) |
| Alpha Alpha | 1961–xxxx ? | State University of New York at Oswego | Oswego, New York | Inactive | |
| **Alpha Beta** | 1963 | Campbellsville University | Campbellsville, Kentucky | Active | |
| **Alpha Gamma** | 1969 | Malone University | Canton, Ohio | Active | |
| Alpha Delta | 1969–xxxx ? | Newman University | Wichita, Kansas | Inactive | |
| Alpha Epsilon | 1969–xxxx ? | Indiana Wesleyan University | Marion, Indiana | Inactive | |
| Alpha Zeta | 1969–xxxx ? | Indiana State University | Terre Haute, Indiana | Inactive | |
| **Alpha Eta** | 1969 | University of Olivet | Olivet, Michigan | Active | |
| Anne Arundel Associate | 1970–xxxx ? | Anne Arundel Community College | Arnold, Maryland | Inactive | |
| Illinois Central Associate | 1970–xxxx ? | Illinois Central College | East Peoria, Illinois | Inactive | |
| Alpha Theta | 1970–xxxx ? | Asbury College | Wilmore, Kentucky | Inactive | |
| **Alpha Kappa** | 1970 | University of Southern Indiana | Evansville, Indiana | Inactive | |
| Alpha Lambda | 1970–xxxx ? | Suffolk University | Boston, Massachusetts | Inactive | |
| Alpha Mu | 1971–xxxx ? | Immaculata College | Immaculata, Pennsylvania | Inactive | |
| **Alpha Nu** | 1971 | Oglethorpe University | Brookhaven, Georgia | Active | |
| Alpha Xi | 1971–xxxx ? | University of Virginia's College at Wise | Wise, Virginia | Active | |
| Alpha Omicron | 1971–xxxx ? | Charleston Southern University | Charleston, South Carolina | Inactive | (Note: Chapter formed at Baptist College at Charleston, which became Charleston Southern University in 1990.) |
| Alpha Pi | 1972–xxxx ? | Trevecca Nazarene University | Nashville, Tennessee | Inactive | |
| **Alpha Rho** | 1972 | Stonehill College | Easton, Massachusetts | Active | |
| Alpha Sigma | 1972–xxxx ? | Dakota Wesleyan University | Mitchell, South Dakota | Inactive | |
| Alpha Tau | 1973–1980 ? | Annhurst College | Woodstock, Connecticut | Inactive | |
| Alpha Upsilon | 1975–xxxx ? | Union University | Jackson, Tennessee | Inactive | |
| **Alpha Phi** | 1975 | Marist College | Poughkeepsie, New York | Active | |
| **Alpha Chi** | 1976 | Eastern College | St. Davids, Pennsylvania | Active | |
| **Alpha Psi** | 1976 | Hillsdale College | Hillsdale, Michigan | Active | |
| Alpha Omega | 1976–xxxx ? | Saint Mary-of-the-Woods College | Saint Mary-of-the-Woods, Indiana | Active | |
| Beta Alpha | 1977–xxxx ? | Lyndon State College | Lyndonville, Vermont | Inactive | (Note: The college closed in 2018.) |
| Beta Beta | 1978–xxxx ? | George Fox University | Newberg, Oregon | Inactive | |
| **Beta Gamma** | 1978 | Columbia College | Columbia, Missouri | Active | |
| **Beta Delta** | 1996 | Gwynedd Mercy University | Gwynedd Valley, Pennsylvania | Active | |
| Beta Epsilon | 1979–xxxx ? | Arcadia University | Glenside, Pennsylvania | Inactive | |
| Beta Zeta | 1981–xxxx ? | Cabrini College | Radnor, Pennsylvania | Inactive | (Note: The college closed in 2016.) |
| **Beta Eta** | 1985 | Evangel University | Springfield, Missouri | Active | |
| Beta Theta | 1983–xxxx ? | Belhaven College | Jackson, Mississippi | Inactive | |
| **Beta Iota** | 1983 | Bethel University | Saint Paul, Minnesota | Inactive | |
| **Beta Kappa** | 1991 | Kentucky Wesleyan College | Owensboro, Kentucky | Inactive | |
| Beta Lambda | 1993–xxxx ? | Messiah College | Mechanicsburg, Pennsylvania | Inactive | |
| Beta Mu | 1994–xxxx ? | Coastal Carolina University | Conway, South Carolina | Inactive | |
| **Somerset Associate** | 1997 | Somerset Community College | Somerset, Kentucky | Active | |
| Beta Nu | 1997–xxxx ? | Houghton College | Houghton, New York | Inactive | |
| **Beta XI** | 1999 | University of Pikeville | Pikeville, Kentucky | Active | |
| Beta Omicron | 2001–20xx ? | Madonna University | Livonia, Michigan | Inactive | |
| Beta Pi | 2004–20xx ? | University of Arkansas at Monticello | Monticello, Arkansas | Active | |
| Beta Rho | 2005–20xx ? | Castleton State College | Castleton, Vermont | Inactive | |
| **Alpena Associate** | 2005 | Alpena Community College | Alpena, Michigan | Active | |
| Beta Sigma | 2007–20xx ? | Baker University | Baldwin City, Kansas | Inactive | |
| **Beta Tau** | 2008 | Gardner–Webb University | Boiling Springs, North Carolina | Active | |
| Beta Upsilon | 2009–c. 2019 | Marygrove College | Detroit, Michigan | Inactive | (Note: The college closed in 2019.) |
| Beta Phi | 2009–20xx ? | College of the Ozarks | Point Lookout, Missouri | Inactive | |
| **Beta Chi** | 2011 | Walsh University | Canton, Ohio | Active | |
| Beta Psi | 2011–20xx ? | Martin University | Indianapolis, Indiana | Inactive | |
| **Beta Omega** | 2011 | Virginia Wesleyan University | Norfolk, Virginia | Active | |
| **Gamma Alpha** | 2011 | Chestnut Hill College | Philadelphia, Pennsylvania | Active | |
| Gamma Beta | 2011–20xx ? | Concord University | Athens, West Virginia | Inactive | |
| **Gamma Gamma** | 2012 | Concordia College | Moorhead, Minnesota | Active | |
| **Gamma Delta** | 2012 | The Master's University | Santa Clarita, California | Active | |
| **Gamma Epsilon** | 2012 | Franklin Pierce University | Rindge, New Hampshire | Active | |
| Gamma Zeta | 2012–20xx ? | St. Thomas Aquinas College | Sparkill, New York | Inactive | |
| **Gamma Eta** | 2012 | Marian University | Indianapolis, Indiana | Active | |
| **Gamma Theta** | 2013 | Georgian Court University | Lakewood Township, New Jersey | Active | |
| **Gamma Iota** | 2013 | Neumann University | Aston Township, Pennsylvania | Active | |
| **Gamma Kappa** | 2014 | Southwest Baptist University | Bolivar, Missouri | Active | |
| **College of the Canyons Associate** | 2014–20xx ? | College of the Canyons | Santa Clarita, California | Inactive | |
| Gamma Lambda | 2015–20xx ? | Missouri Baptist University | St. Louis, Missouri | Active | |
| **Gamma Mu** | 2015 | Baptist Health Sciences University | Memphis, Tennessee | Active | |
| Gamma Nu | 2015–20xx ? | Chowan University | Murfreesboro, North Carolina | Inactive | |
| Gamma Xi | 2015–20xx ? | King's College | Wilkes-Barre, Pennsylvania | Inactive | |
| Gamma Omicron | 2015–202x ? | Saint Joseph's University | Philadelphia, Pennsylvania | Inactive | |
| **Gamma Pi** | 2017 | Warner University | Lake Wales, Florida | Active | |
| **Gamma Rho** | 2017 | Miami Dade College Padrón Campus | Miami, Florida | Active | |
| Gamma Sigma | 2018–20xx ? | Colorado Christian University | Lakewood, Colorado | Inactive | |
| **Gamma Tau** | 2018 | Faulkner University | Montgomery, Alabama | Active | |
| Gamma Upsilon | 2018–20xx ? | Wilmington University | New Castle, Delaware | Active | |
| Olive-Harvey College Associate | 2019–202x ? | Olive–Harvey College | Chicago, Illinois | Inactive | |
| **Gamma Phi** | 2024 | St. Mary's University | Calgary, Alberta, Canada | Active | |
| **Gamma Chi** | 2024 | University of Health Sciences and Pharmacy in St. Louis | St. Louis, Missouri | Active | |
| **Gamma Psi** | 2026 | Brewton-Parker Christian University | Mount Vernon, Georgia | Active | |
