= Anthony Daly =

Anthony Daly may refer to:

- Anthony W. Daly (1904–1960), American judge, lawyer, and politician
- Anthony Daly (Whiteboy) (died 1820), Irish rebel
- Anthony Daly (hurler) (born 1969), Irish hurling player
- Anthony Daly (cricketer) (born 1969), cricketer
- Anthony Daly (footballer) (1874–1942), Australian rules footballer
- Tony Daly (born 1966), Australian rugby union player

== See also ==
- Tony Daley (born 1967), English footballer
