= Reuben M. Benjamin House =

Historic house in Illinois, United States

- U.S. National Register of Historic Places
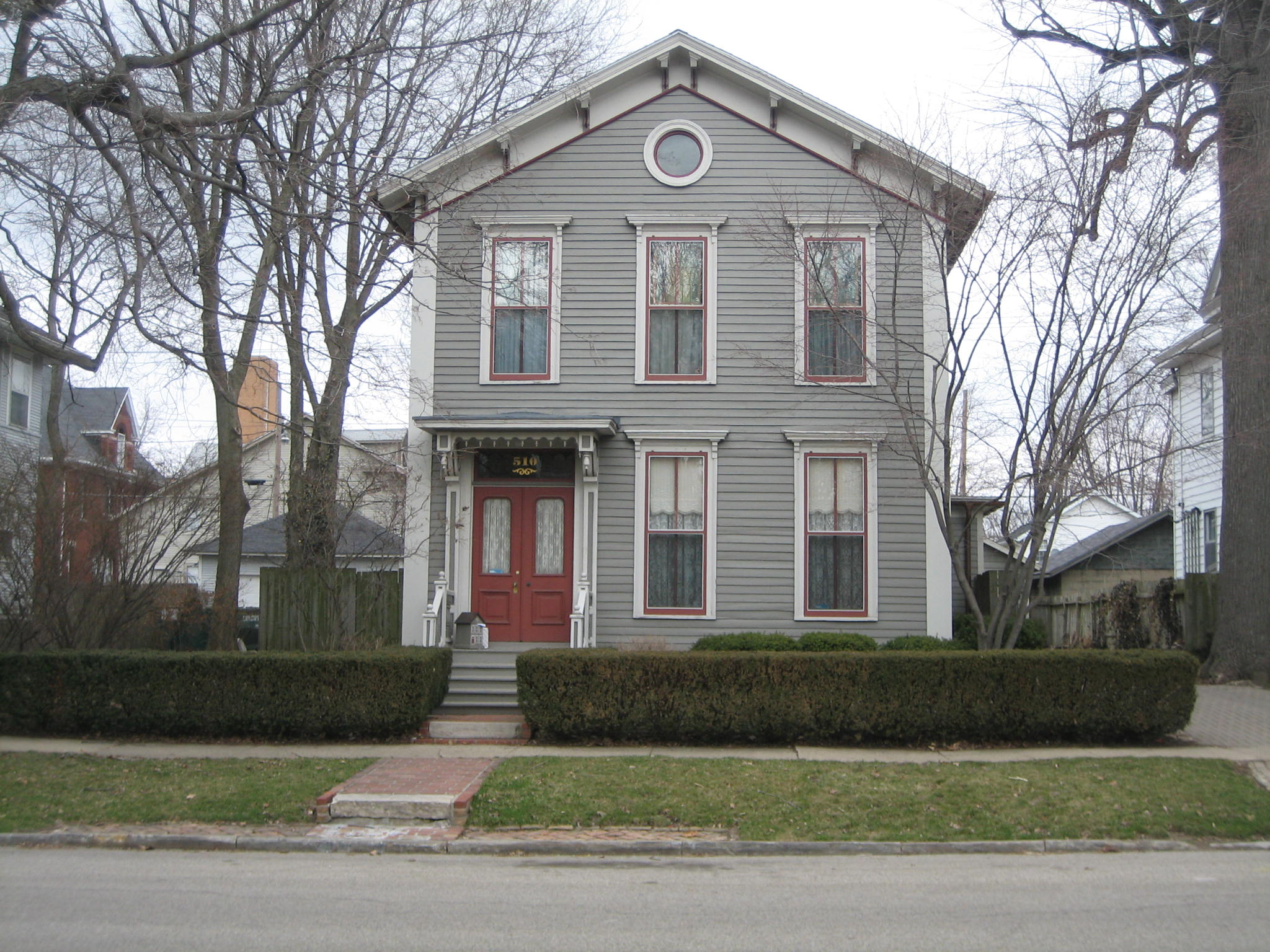

- Location within Illinois Location within the United States
- Location: 510 E. Grove St., Bloomington, Illinois
- Coordinates: 40°28′41″N 88°59′11″W
- Area: less than one acre
- Built: 1856
- Architect: John L. Routt (Builder)
- Architectural style: Classical Revival
- NRHP reference No.: 78003109
- Added to NRHP: August 30, 1978

The Reuben (Note: Reuben Moore Benjamin's name was misspelled in the original application to the US Register.) M. Benjamin House is a house in Bloomington, Illinois. It is a two-story rectangular building, styled in the Classical Revival architectural motif. It was built in 1856 by John L. Routt, who would become the first governor of Colorado. Reuben Moore Benjamin, an attorney known for litigation relating to railroad regulation, lived in the home for more than 60 years. The United States National Register of Historic Places added the house in August 1978.

== History ==
The home was constructed in 1856 by John L. Routt. It is the only home in Bloomington that can be definitively attributed to Routt. The rectangular two-story house was built for lawyer and Bloomington resident Reuben Moore Benjamin. Benjamin was an attorney who represented the people in The People vs. Chicago and Alton Railroad as well as helped to develop the famed Granger cases. The railroad case was widely considered a benchmark ruling that allowed the government to regulate private enterprises.

== Architecture ==
The home is cast in the Classical Revival architectural style. The house was built by Routt, who later became the first governor of the state of Colorado. Simple in its design, the exterior of the house has remained almost unchanged since the late 19th century, and possibly before that. The front of the house and the end of its gabled roof face East Grove Street to the south. The second story features three rectangular windows, with a circular window gracing the gable end at the third floor attic. At its front and back ends, the roof is supported by shallow wooden brackets. The double front door has a small flat roof overhanging it, and the west side of the house features a bay window.

== Significance ==
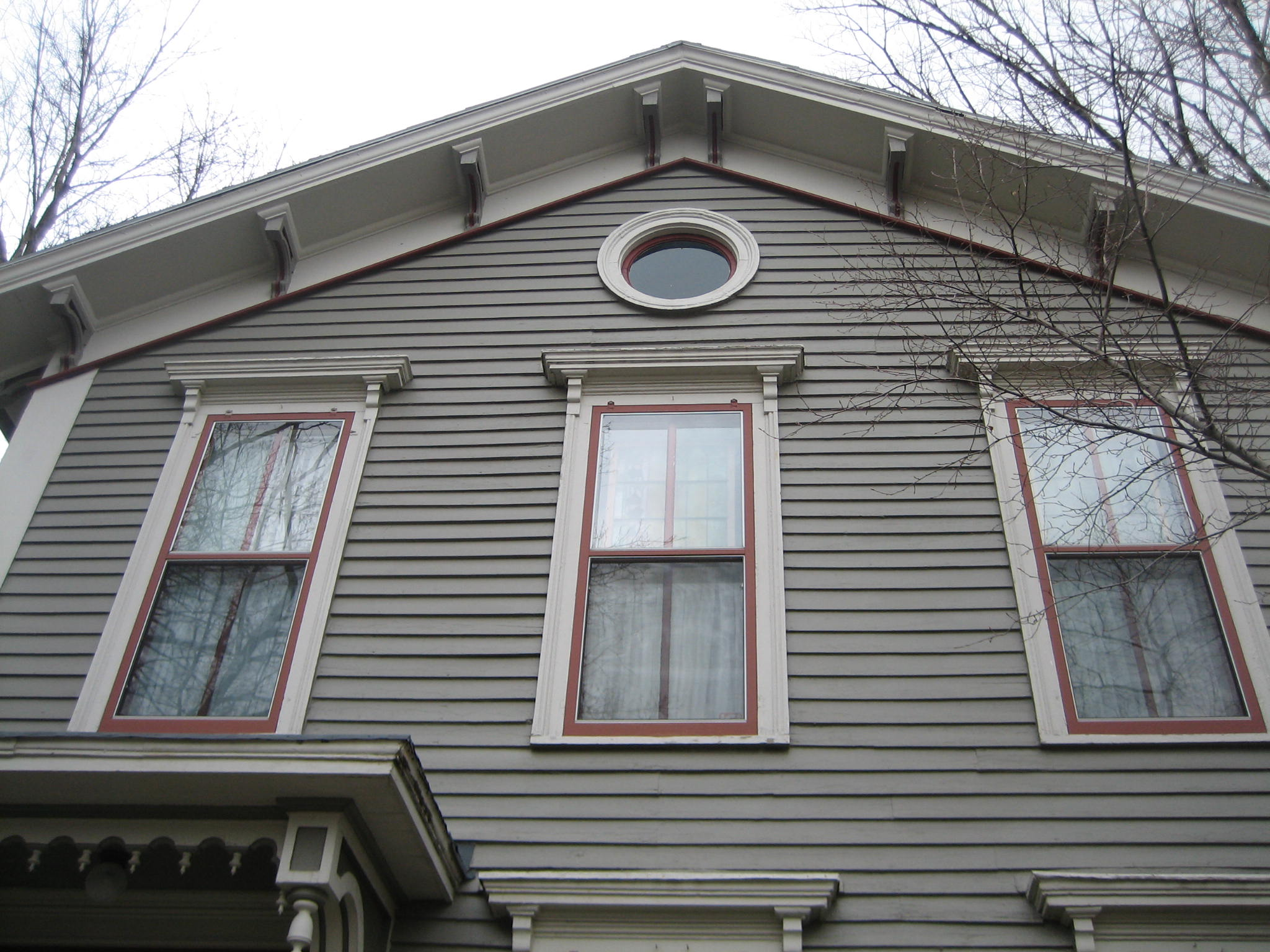
Brackets and the circular window are prominent on the south side of the house.

The house was added to the U.S. National Register of Historic Places on August 20, 1982. Though the structure is listed on the National Register independently, it is included within the boundaries of the East Grove Street Historic District. The house is considered a contributing property to the historic district, which was added to the National Register in 1987.

The historic significance of the home is in its association with Reuben M. Benjamin, who lived in it for more than 60 years until his death in 1917. Benjamin was raised in Chatham Center, Columbia County, New York. He graduated from Kinderhook Academy and then Amherst College and eventually attended Harvard law school for a year. He ended up in Bloomington in 1856. When Benjamin passed the bar exam in 1856, Abraham Lincoln served as his examiner. After passing the bar, Benjamin married and practiced law with various Bloomington lawyers, such as Asahel Gridley and Thomas F. Tipton. In 1869, Benjamin was elected to the Illinois state constitutional convention, where he distinguished himself as a leader. During the convention Benjamin strongly advocated language allowing the regulation of the freight industry. The clauses he supported were included in Article XI of the Illinois Constitution.

Benjamin soon put the new constitution to the test. In 1872, he filed quo warranto proceedings against the Chicago and Alton Railroad, demanding their charter be revoked because they were charging rates which seemed unfair. The Chicago and Alton Railroad's rate structure charged US$5.65 to haul 1,000 ft (300 m) of lumber from Chicago to Lexington but charged 65 cents less for a longer trip from Chicago to Bloomington. As a result, lower courts ruled that the state could regulate the rate structures of railroads, later the Supreme Court of the United States overturned the ruling on the grounds that some rate discrimination may prove justifiable. During the process of their decision, the Supreme Court made it clear that states did indeed have the right to regulate the rates of railroads and, by implication, the right to regulate other companies.

== See also ==
- George H. Cox House
- Munn v. Illinois
