= 1933 Northern Illinois State Evansmen football team =

American college football season

1933 Northern Illinois State Evansmen football
- Conference: Illinois Intercollegiate Athletic Conference
- Record: 5–4 (4–3 IIAC)
- Head coach: Chick Evans (5th season)
- Captains: Art Court; Jack Mustapha
- Home stadium: Glidden Field

1933 Illinois Intercollegiate Athletic Conference football standings
	Conf.					Overall
Team	W		L		T	W		L		T
Illinois Wesleyan $	4	–	0	–	1	6	–	2	–	1
North Central	2	–	0	–	2	4	–	0	–	2
St. Viator	2	–	0	–	0	3	–	4	–	0
Millikin	1	–	0	–	2	3	–	1	–	2
McKendree	4	–	1	–	0	6	–	3	–	0
Augustana (IL)	4	–	1	–	1	7	–	1	–	1
Illinois College	4	–	1	–	1	4	–	2	–	1
Carthage	3	–	1	–	1	4	–	1	–	2
Illinois State Normal	5	–	2	–	0	6	–	3	–	0
Southern Illinois	4	–	2	–	0	4	–	4	–	1
Lake Forest	2	–	1	–	0	3	–	3	–	1
Bradley	3	–	2	–	1	3	–	5	–	2
Northern Illinois State	4	–	3	–	0	5	–	4	–	0
Monmouth (IL)	2	–	3	–	0	4	–	5	–	0
Western Illinois	2	–	4	–	0	3	–	5	–	0
Wheaton (IL)	1	–	2	–	2	2	–	2	–	3
Eastern Illinois	1	–	5	–	0	1	–	8	–	0
Elmhurst	0	–	3	–	1	0	–	5	–	1
Shurtleff	0	–	5	–	0	0	–	7	–	1
Knox (IL)	0	–	5	–	0	0	–	8	–	0
Eureka	0	–	7	–	0	0	–	7	–	0
$ – Conference champion

The 1933 Northern Illinois State Evansmen football team represented Northern Illinois State Teachers College—now known as Northern Illinois University—as a member of the Illinois Intercollegiate Athletic Conference (IIAC) during the 1933 college football season. Led by fifth-year head coach Chick Evans, the Evansmen compiled an overall record of 5–4 with a mark of 4–3 in conference play, placing 13th in the IIAC. The team played home games at the 5,500-seat Glidden Field, located on the east end of campus, in DeKalb, Illinois.

== Schedule ==
Date	Opponent	Site	Result
September 31	at Illinois State	Normal, IL	L 7–19
October 7	Eureka	Glidden Field; DeKalb, IL	W 12–0
October 14	at Gary JC*	Gary, IN	L 0–7
October 21	Eastern Illinois	Glidden Field; DeKalb, IL	W 12–6
October 27	Wisconsin Tech*	Glidden Field; DeKalb, IL	W 40–0
November 4	at Millikin	Decatur, IL	L 0–7
November 10	Wheaton (IL)	Glidden Field; DeKalb, IL	W 25–0
November 18	Elmhurst	Glidden Field; DeKalb, IL	W 17–6
November 25	at Southern Illinois	Carbondale, IL	L 0–13
*Non-conference game
