= 1933 Southern Illinois Maroons football team =

American college football season

1933 Southern Illinois Maroons football
- Conference: Illinois Intercollegiate Athletic Conference
- Record: 4–4–1 (4–2 IIAC)
- Head coach: William McAndrew (17th season)

1933 Illinois Intercollegiate Athletic Conference football standings
	Conf.					Overall
Team	W		L		T	W		L		T
Illinois Wesleyan $	4	–	0	–	1	6	–	2	–	1
North Central	2	–	0	–	2	4	–	0	–	2
St. Viator	2	–	0	–	0	3	–	4	–	0
Millikin	1	–	0	–	2	3	–	1	–	2
McKendree	4	–	1	–	0	6	–	3	–	0
Augustana (IL)	4	–	1	–	1	7	–	1	–	1
Illinois College	4	–	1	–	1	4	–	2	–	1
Carthage	3	–	1	–	1	4	–	1	–	2
Illinois State Normal	5	–	2	–	0	6	–	3	–	0
Southern Illinois	4	–	2	–	0	4	–	4	–	1
Lake Forest	2	–	1	–	0	3	–	3	–	1
Bradley	3	–	2	–	1	3	–	5	–	2
Northern Illinois State	4	–	3	–	0	5	–	4	–	0
Monmouth (IL)	2	–	3	–	0	4	–	5	–	0
Western Illinois	2	–	4	–	0	3	–	5	–	0
Wheaton (IL)	1	–	2	–	2	2	–	2	–	3
Eastern Illinois	1	–	5	–	0	1	–	8	–	0
Elmhurst	0	–	3	–	1	0	–	5	–	1
Shurtleff	0	–	5	–	0	0	–	7	–	1
Knox (IL)	0	–	5	–	0	0	–	8	–	0
Eureka	0	–	7	–	0	0	–	7	–	0
$ – Conference champion

The 1933 Southern Illinois Maroons football team was an American football team that represented Southern Illinois Normal University (now known as Southern Illinois University Carbondale) in the Illinois Intercollegiate Athletic Conference (IIAC) during the 1933 college football season. In its 17th season under head coach William McAndrew, the team compiled a 4–4–1 record.

== Schedule ==
Date	Opponent	Site	Result	Source
September 29	at Murray State*	Murray, KY	L 0–13	
October 6	at Cape Girardeau*	Houck Stadium; Cape Girardeau, MO	T 0–0	
October 14	Western Illinois	Carbondale, IL	W 45–0	
October 21	at McKendree	Lebanon, IL	L 0–13	
October 28	at Illinois State Normal	McCormick Field; Normal, IL	L 0–12	
November 4	Shurtleff	Carbondale, IL	W 2–0	
November 10	Cape Girardeau*	Carbondale, IL	L 9–12	
November 18	at Eastern Illinois	Schahrer Field; Charleston, IL	W 19–0	
November 25	Northern Illinois State	Carbondale, IL	W 13–0	
*Non-conference game
