= Senator Coon =

Senator Coon may refer to:

- Reuben W. Coon (1842–1908), Illinois State Senate
- Sam Coon (1903–1980), Oregon State Senate

== See also ==
- Chris Coons (born 1963), U.S. Senator from Delaware since 2010
