= Solex =

Solex may refer to:

- Solex (musician), Dutch musician
- Solex (manufacturer), a French manufacturer of carburetors and the powered bicycle VéloSoleX
- Solex College, a former private for-profit college in Chicago, Illinois
- Solex Unit, a fictional Solar-Generator in the film The Man with the Golden Gun
- VéloSoleX, a French cyclemotor also known as simply Solex

== See also ==
- Solexa, a British company acquired by Illumina, Inc.
