= List of defunct colleges and universities in Illinois =

The following is a list of defunct universities and colleges in Illinois. This list includes accredited, degree-granting institutions and bona fide institutions of higher learning that operated before accreditation existed. All had at least one location within the state of Illinois, and all have since discontinued operations or their operations were taken over by another similar institution of higher learning.

== Defunct colleges and universities in Illinois ==
- Abingdon College
- American Conservatory of Music
- Argosy University
- Barat College
- Brown's Business College
- Bush Conservatory of Music
- Central YMCA College
- Chicago Conservatory College
- Chicago Technical College
- Curtiss–Wright Aeronautical University
- Dixon College
- Ellis University
- Evanston College for Ladies
- George Williams College (Chicago)
- Gibbs College
- Harrington College of Design
- Harvey Medical College
- Hedding College
- Illinois Institute of Art – Chicago
- Illinois Institute of Art – Schaumburg
- Illinois State University (Springfield, Illinois)
- Illinois Technical College
- International Academy of Design & Technology – Schaumburg
- International Academy of Design and Technology
- Jubilee College, Illinois
- Judson College (Mount Palatine, Illinois)
- La Salle Extension University
- Le Cordon Bleu College of Culinary Arts in Chicago
- Lexington College
- Lincoln Christian University
- Lincoln College
- Lincoln College of Law
- Lombard College
- MacMurray College
- Midstate College
- Morthland College
- Mount Morris College
- Mundelein College
- Nauvoo University
- Northwestern College
- Northwestern University Dental School
- Northwestern University Woman's Medical School
- Old University of Chicago
- Robert Morris University Illinois
- Ruskin Colleges
- Sanford-Brown College
- State Community College of East Saint Louis
- St. Viator College
- Shimer Great Books School
- Shurtleff College
- Solex College
- University of Chicago Graduate Library School
- University of Nauvoo
- Vatterott College
- Westfield College (Illinois)
- Westwood College
- William & Vashti College
