= Charles E. Fairman =

American physician (1856–1934)

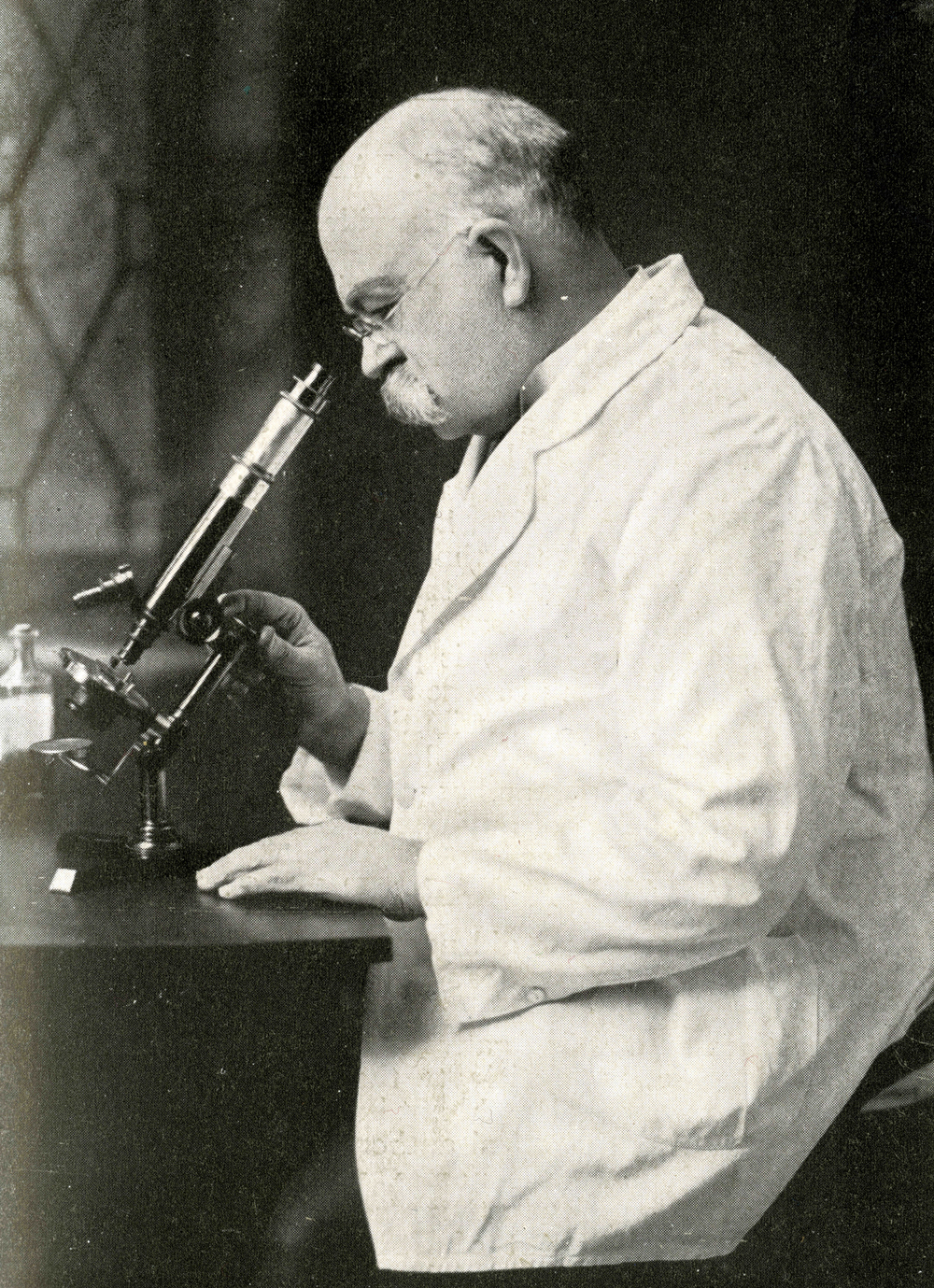
Charles E. Fairman at about age 60

Charles Edward Fairman (28 December 1856 – 27 December 1934) was an American physician who published in the field of mycology. He was for many years the health officer of Yates, New York, and on the staff of the Medina (New York) Memorial Hospital. A charter member of the Mycological Society of America, Fairman published several papers relating to fungi including the pyrenomycetes, the Lophiostomataceae, and the fungi imperfecti.

== Early life ==
Fairman was born on 28 December 1856 to parents Prof. and Mrs. Charles E. Fairman in Yates, New York, both of whom were teachers. He entered the senior class of the University of Rochester at the age of 16, and was at the time the youngest graduate the university produced. He graduated from that institution in 1873 with an A.M. degree and received his M.D. degree when he graduated from Shurtleff College in Alton, Illinois, in 1877. On 5 February 1878, he married Lois Warren, who died on 23 August 1912.

Fairman had returned to Lyndonville to practice medicine before his 21st birthday. He was a member of several medical societies and wrote for a number of medical periodicals. The fraternity journal Delta Upsilon Quarterly, in their 1890 alumni report, reports him as being employed as the Examining Surgeon for the United States Pension Department in Medina, New York. In July 1927, the Orleans County Medical Association gave him a testimonial dinner in celebration of his 50th year in the practice of medicine.

Fairman achieved worldwide renown as a mycologist. He began studying the fungi at about age 30, when his interest was piqued when he and his father-in-law (Dr. John D. Warren) undertook to cultivate mushrooms. He corresponded with various noted authorities in mycology, including Job Bicknell Ellis, Charles Horton Peck, Pier Andrea Saccardo, Heinrich Rehm, and Joseph Charles Arthur. Fairman accumulated a large personal collection of mycological books, as well as a personal herbarium of 23,000 various fungi, some of which has been incorporated in the Plant Pathology Herbarium at Cornell University. Fairman also collected specimens for the New York Botanical Garden Herbarium. Fairman was also noted as an authority on many plants.

== Career ==
He spent the majority of his life in Lyndonville, New York, where he was one of the "best known and beloved physicians". He specialized in pyrenomycetous fungi, and mycologist Curtis Gates Lloyd once wrote "Dr. Fairman has probably the best critical knowledge of this difficult group of any one in our country." Fairman died suddenly of a heart attack on 27 December 1934, a day before he was to be honored for his 78th birthday. He is buried in Lynhaven cemetery in Lyndonville.

== Taxa described ==
Fairman's taxonomical contributions were mostly related to pyrenomycetes and the fungi imperfecti. In his later years he specialized in the Lophiostomataceae. Taxa described by Fairman include:

- Amblyosporiopsis Fairm. 1922
- Amblyosporiopsis parasphenoides Fairm. 1922
- Amphisphaeria abietina Fairm. 1906
- Amphisphaeria aeruginosa Fairm. 1906
- Amphisphaeria bertiana Fairm. 1906
- Amphisphaeria nucidoma Fairm. 1921
- Amphisphaeria polymorpha Fairm. 1906
- Amphisphaeria vestigialis Fairm. 1910
- Amphisphaeria xera Fairm. 1910
- Anthostomella endoxyloides Fairm. 1922
- Apiosporella cornina Fairm. 1918
- Aplosporella calycanthi Fairm. 1910
- Ascochyta agropyrina Fairm. 1931
- Ascochyta boutelouae Fairm. 1918
- Ascochyta phlogina Fairm. 1910
- Ascochyta phlogis var. phlogina Fairm. 1910
- Ascochyta symphoricarpophila Fairm. 1910
- Ascochytula agropyrina Fairm. 1918
- Camarosporium elaeagnellum Fairm. 1910
- Camarosporium eriocryptum Fairm. 1923
- Camarosporium estrelti Fairm. 1918
- Camarosporium wistarianum Fairm. 1918
- Camarosporium yuccaesedum Fairm. 1918
- Caryospora cariosa Fairm. 1905
- Chorostate ailanthi var. megaceraphora Fairm. 1906
- Cladosporium punctulatum var. xylogenum Fairm. 1922
- Cladosporium vincae Fairm. 1911
- Clasterosporium larviforme Fairm. 1922
- Coniosporium nucifoedum Fairm. 1921
- Coniothyrium chionanthi Fairm. 1913
- Coniothyrium leprosum Fairm. 1923
- Coniothyrium marrubii Fairm. 1923
- Coniothyrium olivaceum var. salsolae Fairm. 1918
- Coniothyrium olivaceum var. thermopsidis Fairm. 1918
- Coniothyrium praeclarum Fairm. 1922
- Coniothyrium sepium Fairm. 1918
- Cryptodiscus araneocinctus Fairm. 1913
- Cryptostictis utensis Fairm. 1918
- Cucurbitaria rimulina Fairm. 1922
- Cylindrium gossypinum Fairm. 1921
- Cylindrocolla faecalis Fairm. 1920
- Cytospora nyssae Fairm. 1922
- Dendrophoma nigrescens Fairm. 1922
- Diaporthe ailanthi var. megacera Fairm. 1906
- Diaporthe elaeagni var. americana Fairm.
- Diaporthe hamamelidis Fairm. 1922
- Diatrype standleyi Fairm. 1918
- Dicaeoma nemoseridis Fairm. 1923
- Dictyochora gambellii Fairm. 1918
- Didymaria arthoniaespora Fairm. 1906
- Didymella eurotiae Fairm. 1918
- Didymella nucis-hicoriae Fairm. 1921
- Didymella ramonae Fairm. 1923
- Didymochaeta columbiana Fairm. 1922
- Didymosphaeria lonicerae-ripariae Fairm. 1922
- Didymosphaeria nuciseda Fairm. 1921
- Didymosporium propolidioides Fairm. 1922
- Diplodia akebiae Fairm. 1913
- Diplodia hamamelidis Fairm. 1910
- Diplodia heteromelina Fairm. 1923
- Diplodina epicarya Fairm. 1921
- Discella zythiacea Fairm. 1922
- Discosia poikilomera Fairm. 1923
- Dothiorella nucis Fairm. 1921
- Dothiorella phomopsis Fairm. 1918
- Eutypella brunaudiana var. ribis-aurei Fairm. 1918
- Eutypella ceranata Fairm. 1923
- Eutypella domicalis Fairm. 1923
- Excipula dictamni Fairm. 1910
- Exosporium scolecomorphum Fairm. 1922
- Gamonaemella Fairm. 1922
- Gamonaemella divergens Fairm. 1922
- Gibberidea arthrophyma Fairm. 1918
- Gloniopsis lathami Fairm. 1922
- Gloniopsis lathami var. asymetrica Fairm. 1922
- Glonium vestigiale Fairm. 1923
- Graphium sordidiceps Fairm. 1922
- Helotium vitellinum var. pallidostriatum Fairm. 1904
- Hendersonia arundinariae Fairm. 1922
- Hendersonia coccolobina Fairm. 1913
- Hendersonia eriogoni Fairm. 1918
- Hendersonia foliorum-hamamelidina Fairm. 1922
- Hendersonia hortilecta Fairm. 1918
- Hendersonia hydrangeae Fairm. 1910
- Hendersonia hypocarpa Fairm. 1913
- Hendersonia leucelenes Fairm. 1918
- Hendersonia petalostemonis Fairm. 1918
- Hendersonia stanleyellae Fairm. 1918
- Hendersonia subcultriformis Fairm. 1918
- Heteropatella acerina Fairm. 1922
- Hypoderma ptarmicola Fairm. 1906
- Hysterium standleyanum Fairm. 1918
- Karschia crassa Fairm. 1904
- Karschia elaeospora Fairm. 1921
- Lasiosphaeria ovina var. aureliana Fairm. 1904
- Leptosphaeria cacuminispora Fairm. 1921
- Leptosphaeria coleosanthi Fairm. 1918
- Leptosphaeria eustoma f. leguminosa Fairm. 1906
- Leptosphaeria exocarpogena Fairm. 1921
- Leptosphaeria galiorum var. gnaphaliana Fairm. 1923
- Leptosphaeria hamamelidis Fairm. 1922
- Leptosphaeria lyciophila Fairm. 1922
- Leptosphaeria lyndonvillae Fairm. 1906
- Leptosphaeria nigricans var. grindeliae Fairm. 1918
- Leptosphaeria physostegiae Fairm. 1906
- Leptosphaeria pseudohleria Fairm. 1922
- Leptosphaeria quamoclidii Fairm. 1918
- Leptospora stictochaetophora Fairm. 1906
- Leptostroma mitchellae Fairm. 1922
- Lophiostoma cephalanthi Fairm. 1904
- Lophiostoma triseptatum var. acutum Fairm.
- Lophiostoma triseptatum var. diagonale Fairm.
- Lophiostoma triseptatum var. pluriseptatum Fairm.
- Lophiotrema halesiae Fairm. 1910
- Macrophoma fitzpatriciana Fairm. 1921
- Melanomma nigriseda Fairm. 1922
- Melanopsamma amphisphaeria var. carpigena Fairm. 1921
- Melanopsamma subrhombispora Fairm. 1921
- Merulius leguminosus Fairm. 1906
- Merulius lyndonvillae Fairm. 1906
- Metasphaeria leguminosa Fairm. 1906
- Metasphaeria lyndonvillae Fairm. 1906
- Microdiplodia anograe Fairm. 1918
- Microdiplodia diervillae Fairm. 1918
- Microdiplodia galiicola Fairm. 1918
- Microdiplodia ilicigena Fairm. 1922
- Microdiplodia leucelenes Fairm. 1918
- Microdiplodia mimuli Fairm. 1923
- Microdiplodia ramonae Fairm. 1923
- Microdiplodia valvuli Fairm. 1910
- Mollisia lanaria Fairm. 1911
- Monosporium avellaneum Fairm. 1921
- Mucor taeniae Fairm. 1890
- Mycosphaerella chlorogali Fairm. 1923
- Mycosphaerella nemoseridis Fairm. 1923
- Mycosphaerella weigelae Fairm. 1910
- Myriangium catalinae Fairm. 1923
- Oospora sceliscophorus Fairm. 1906
- Ophiobolus gnaphalii var. lanaria Fairm. 1911
- Ophiobolus sceliscophorus Fairm. 1906
- Patellea oreophila Fairm. 1918
- Pestalotia nuciseda Fairm. 1921
- Pestalotia truncata var. septoriana Fairm. 1913
- Phialea phaeoconia Fairm. 1911
- Phialea vitellina var. pallidostriata Fairm.
- Phoma albovestita Fairm.
- Phoma cercidicola Fairm. 1911
- Phoma dioscoreae Fairm. 1922
- Phoma estrelti Fairm. 1918
- Phoma lanuginis Fairm. 1910
- Phoma lyndonvillensis Fairm. 1890
- Phoma megarrhizae Fairm. 1923
- Phoma regina Fairm. 1911
- Phoma rudbeckiae Fairm. 1890
- Phoma sidalceae Fairm. 1918
- Phoma verbascicarpa Fairm. 1918
- Phoma weldiana Fairm.
- Phomopsis carposchiza Fairm. 1921
- Phomopsis ericaceana Fairm. 1918
- Phomopsis fraterna Fairm. 1922
- Phomopsis nicotianae Fairm. 1923
- Phomopsis rubiseda Fairm. 1922
- Phomopsis trillii Fairm. 1922
- Phyllachora blepharoneuri Fairm. 1918
- Phyllachora nuttalliana Fairm. 1923
- Phyllosticta dictamni Fairm. 1910
- Phyllosticta kalmicola var. berolinensiformis Fairm. 1910
- Phyllosticta mortonii Fairm. 1913
- Phyllosticta pitcheriana Fairm. 1910
- Phyllosticta rhoiseda Fairm. 1923
- Physalospora eucalyptina Fairm. 1923
- Physalospora heteromelina Fairm. 1923
- Platystomum phyllogenum Fairm. 1918
- Pleospora aureliana Fairm. 1906
- Pleospora chlorogali Fairm. 1923
- Pyrenochaeta fraxinina Fairm. 1913
- Pyrenochaeta nucinata Fairm. 1921
- Pyrenopeziza cephalanthi Fairm. 1904
- Pyrenophora leucelenes Fairm. 1918
- Rhabdospora baculum var. nucimaculans Fairm. 1921
- Rhabdospora cryphosporopsis Fairm. 1922
- Rhabdospora dumentorum Fairm. 1918
- Rhabdospora dumetorum Fairm. 1918
- Rhabdospora gauracea Fairm. 1918
- Rhabdospora ilicigena Fairm. 1922
- Rhabdospora translucens Fairm. 1918
- Rhynchosphaeria nucicola Fairm. 1921
- Rhynchostoma nucis Fairm. 1921
- Schizocapnodium Fairm. 1921
- Schizocapnodium sarcinellum Fairm. 1921
- Scolicosporium transversum Fairm. 1922
- Septocylindrium nuculinum Fairm. 1921
- Septoria carricerae Fairm. 1913
- Septoria lanaria Fairm. 1911
- Sphaerographium avenaceum Fairm. 1923
- Sphaeronaema epicaulon Fairm. 1922
- Sphaeropsis coccolobae Fairm. 1913
- Sphaeropsis diervillae Fairm.
- Sphaeropsis elaeagnina Fairm. 1910
- Sphaeropsis nebelina Fairm. 1923
- Sphaeropsis opuntiae Fairm. 1922
- Sphaeropsis pallidula Fairm. 1921
- Sphaeropsis rhodocarpa Fairm. 1913
- Sphaeropsis subconfluens Fairm. 1922
- Sphaeropsis wistariana Fairm. 1918
- Sporidesmium leguminosa Fairm. 1906
- Sporormia leguminosa Fairm. 1906
- Sporormia ourasca Fairm. 1922
- Stagonospora humuli-americani Fairm. 1918
- Stagonospora nucicidia Fairm. 1921
- Stagonospora nuciseda Fairm. 1921
- Stagonospora nyssicola Fairm. 1922
- Stemphylium subsphaericum Fairm. 1922
- Stictis lanuginicincta Fairm. 1923
- Strickeria catalinae Fairm. 1923
- Tapesia rhois Fairm. 1900
- Tapesia secamenti Fairm. 1910
- Teichosporella lonicerina Fairm. 1923
- Trichopeziza interpilosa Fairm. 1906
- Trichosphaeria interpilosa Fairm.
- Valsa holodiscina Fairm. 1923
- Valsaria acericola Fairm. 1905
- Vermicularia exocarpinella Fairm. 1921
- Vermicularia phlogina Fairm. 1887
- Vermicularia putaminicrustans Fairm. 1921
- Vermicularia solanoica Fairm.
- Volutella caryogena Fairm. 1921
- Volutella vincae Fairm. 1911
- Zignoëlla nucivora Fairm. 1921

== Publications ==
- Fairman, C.E. (1887). "A method of staining Peziza specimens". Botanical Gazette 12(4): 85. JSTOR 2993840
- ___________ (1887). "Ash in basket work". Botanical Gazette. 12(3): 64–65. JSTOR 2994014
- ___________ (1887). "Vermicularia phlogina Fairm. n. sp.". Botanical Gazette 12(3): 67. JSTOR 2994018
- ___________ (1889). "Black spot of asparagus berries". Journal of Mycology 5(3): 157–158. JSTOR 3752950
- ___________ (1889). "Notes on rare fungi from western New York". Journal of Mycology 5(2): 78–80. JSTOR 3752311
- ___________ (1890). "Observation on the development of some fenestrate sporidia". Journal of Mycology 6(1): 29–31. JSTOR 3752357
- ___________ (1890). "The fungi of western New York". Proceedings of the Rochester Academy of Sciences 2: 154–167.
- ___________ (1900). "Puff-balls, slime moulds and cup fungi of Orleans County, New York". Proceedings of the Rochester Academy of Sciences 3: 206–220.
- ___________ (1904). "Some new fungi from western New York". Journal of Mycology 10(5): 229–231. JSTOR 3752647
- ___________ (1905). "The Pyrenomyceteae or Orleans County, New York". Proceedings of the Rochester Academy of Sciences 4: 165–191.
- ___________ (1906). "Pyrenomycetaceae novae in leguminibus Robiniae". Annales Mycologici 4:326–328.
- ___________ (1906). "New or rare Pyrenomycetaceae from western New York". Proceedings of the Rochester Academy of Sciences 4: 215–224, pl.20–22.
- ___________, Bonansea S, Saccardo PA. (1906). "Micromycetes Americani Novi". The Journal of Mycology 12(2): 47–52. JSTOR 3752620
- ___________ (1910). "Fungi Lyndonvillenses novi vel minus cogniti". Annales Mycologici 8 (3): 322–332.
- ___________ (1910, publ. 1911). "Fungi Lyndonvillenses novi vel minus cogniti. Series II". Annales Mycologici 9: 147–152, 7 figs.
- ___________ (1913). "Notes on new species of fungi from various localities". Mycologia 5(4): 245–248. JSTOR 3753390
- ___________ (1918). "Notes on new species of fungi from various localities – II". Mycologia 10(3): 164–167. JSTOR 3753053
- ___________ (1918). "New or noteworthy ascomycetes and lower fungi from New Mexico. Mycologia 10(5): 239–264. JSTOR 3753188
- ___________ (1921). "The fungi of our common nuts and pits". Proceedings of the Rochester Academy of Sciences 6: 73–115, tabs 15–20.
- ___________ (1922). "New or rare fungi from various localities". Proceedings of the Rochester Academy of Sciences 6: 117–139.
