= Flora Hamilton Cassel =

American musician, composer, and activist

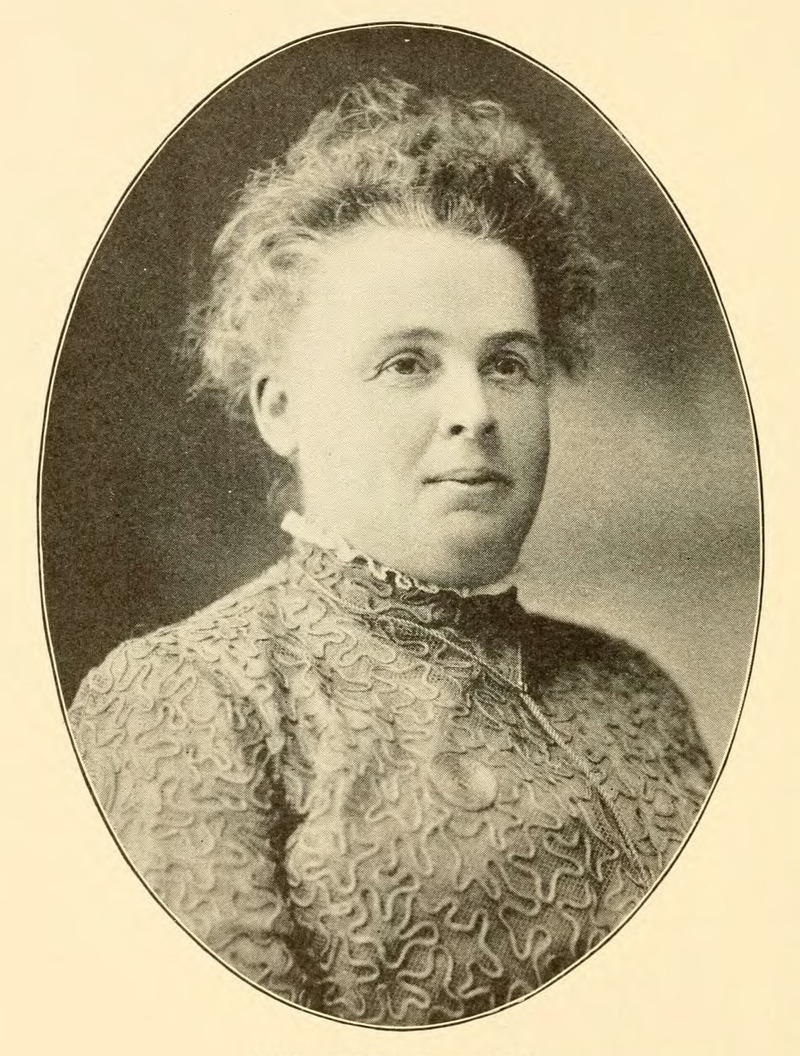
- Born: August 21, 1852; Otterville
- Died: November 17, 1911; Denver
- Spouse: Elijah Taylor Cassel

Flora Hamilton Cassel (August 21, 1852 – November 17, 1911) was an American musician, composer, and temperance activist.

Flora Hamilton was born on August 21, 1852 in Otterville, Illinois, the daughter of Rev. Benjamin Brown Hamilton. Her siblings include John Brown Hamilton and Henry Dewitt Hamilton. She was raised in White Hall, Illinois, where Rev. Hamilton was a Baptist pastor, until she was 16, then lived with an aunt in Brooklyn, New York, where she studied voice under Madame Hartell. She then attended the Maplewood Institute in Pittsfield, Massachusetts, where she studied piano and composition under Benjamin C. Blodgett and voice under J. I. Lalor.

After graduating in 1873, she headed the music department of Shurtleff College in Alton, Illinois. She married Dr. Elijah Taylor Cassel and they moved to Nebraska. In a building in Hastings, Nebraska, she taught piano and organ and sold musical instruments on the first floor, while her husband practiced medicine on the second. The couple collaborated on numerous hymns, with Elijah writing the words and Flora composing the music, including "The King's Business" and "Loyalty to Christ". She headed the Edgar, Nebraska chapter of the Woman's Christian Temperance Union and published a temperance songbook, White Ribbon Vibrations (1890). Her song from that volume "Around the World" was widely adopted as a temperance anthem.

In 1902, the couple moved to Denver, Colorado. She died there on November 17, 1911, dragged to death by a team of horses after her dress was caught on the step of a buggy.
