= Lexington High School (Illinois) =

High school in Lexington, Illinois, US

Location
- 100 East Wall Street; Lexington, Illinois 61753; United States
- 40°38′42″N 88°46′48″W

Information
- School district: Lexington Community Unit School District 7
- Principal: Jennifer McCoy
- Teaching staff: 14.13 (FTE)
- Grades: 9-12
- Enrollment: 161 (2023-2024)
- Student to teacher ratio: 11.39
- Colors: Purple and white
- Nickname: Minutemen
- Website: www.lexington.k12.il.us

Lexington High School is the high school of Lexington Community Unit School District 7 in Lexington, Illinois. The high school usually enrolls 40 to 50 students in each of the 4 grade levels.

== Academics ==
Some Heartland Community College classes are offered on campus for college prep students.

== Extracurricular activities ==
Academic teams include Math Team and Scholastic Bowl. Clubs include FFA, Key Club, student council, and National Honor Society. The students also participate in concert and marching bands, chorus, plays and musicals, art exhibits and mock trail.

== Sports ==
Girls' sports include volleyball, golf, swimming, basketball, track and softball. Boys' sports are golf, football, basketball, track and baseball. Cheerleading is co-ed.

Lexington's football team has been to the IHSA state championship 5 times: in 1980, 1990, 1994, 2001, and 2009. Long-time Lexington Football Coach (1968-1984) and Illinois High School Football Coaches Hall of Fame inductee Jim Mannaioni led the Minutemen to their first state finals game in 1980 where they lost 16-17 to Atwood-Hammond. Before Mannaioni took over, Lexington had averaged two wins each of the previous 18 years.

== Notable alumni ==
- Alex Tanney, former NFL player
