= Lexington, Illinois =

Lexington
- City
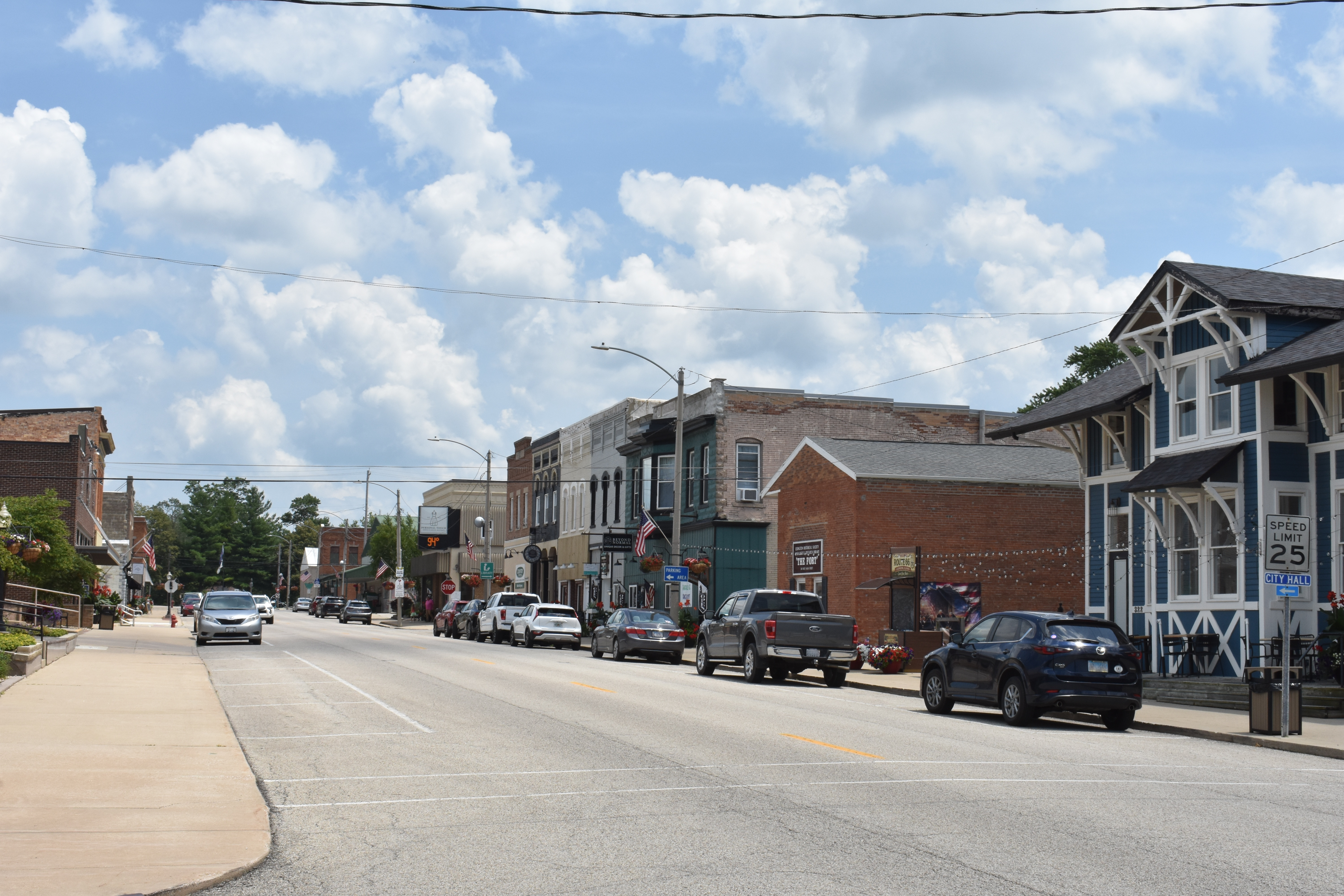
- Downtown Lexington

- Flag Seal Logo

- Location of Lexington in McLean County, Illinois.
- Coordinates: 40°38′49″N 88°47′03″W
- Country: United States
- State: Illinois
- County: McLean
- Townships: Lexington, Money Creek

Government
  - Mayor: Spencer Johansen

Area
  - Total: 2.05 sq mi (5.30 km^{2})
  - Land: 2.05 sq mi (5.30 km^{2})
  - Water: 0 sq mi (0.00 km^{2})
- Elevation: 748 ft (228 m)

Population (2020)
  - Total: 2,090
  - Density: 1,021/sq mi (394.2/km^{2})
- Time zone: UTC-6 (CST)
  - Summer (DST): UTC-5 (CDT)
- ZIP code: 61753
- Area code: 309
- FIPS code: 17-43094
- GNIS ID: 2395695
- Website: www.lexingtonil.gov

Lexington is a city in McLean County, Illinois, United States. The population was 2,090 at the 2020 census. There are two theories regarding the etymology of the city name. One says it was named for the Battle of Lexington, where General Asahel Gridley's father fought, and the other says that it was named for Lexington, Kentucky, the hometown of James Brown, the town's co-founder.

== History ==
=== Origin and original town design ===
Lexington was laid out on 4 January 1836 by Asahel Gridley (1810–1881) and James Brown (c. 1802- ?). Gridley was a lawyer and banker from Bloomington who would eventually become the richest man in McLean County; Brown was born in Lexington, Kentucky, and Lexington, Illinois, seems to have been his only attempt at founding a town. Its founding was part of a great real estate boom that swept across the nation. Within a few months of the founding of the town seven other new towns were laid out in McLean County: Concord (now Danvers), Hudson, Le Roy, Livingston, Lytleville, Mt. Hope and Wilksborough. In common with other towns founded during the 1836 boom, and unlike many later towns, Lexington was designed around a central public square with streets running true north–south and east–west. In the case of Lexington, the original town consisted of 36 blocks, each containing six lots. Like most of the towns of the 1836 era the town was built along the line that divided woodland from prairie; the southeast corner of the town was just within the limits of timber. Like most Mackinaw River towns, Lexington was laid out on higher ground some distance from the river itself.

=== First advertisement and sale of town lots ===
Gridley and Brown first offered lots in the town for sale at a public auction on 30 April 1836 at 10:00 in the morning. They began their printed advertisement for the sale by telling readers that the town was on the main road from Springfield, via Bloomington, to Chicago and that their new town was a mile from the Mackinaw River. They wrote that Lexington "is located on the margin of a fine rolling prairie, near a large and inexhaustible body of the best timber the country affords, sufficient to justify the immense settlement already being made." They told potential buyers that there were two saw mills and a fulling mill nearby. Moreover, they added, building had already begun. For those with good security, one twelve months credit was available.

=== The pre-railroad era ===
Between 1837 and 1854 the survival of Lexington was in doubt. The great land rush that peaked in 1836 gave way to a severe lengthy national depression. True to their word, Gridley and Brown had begun some construction. Their first structure was used as a store, but in less than a year the business had failed and the building was hauled away to Bloomington. The first house was briefly occupied, but it was soon moved to the rival town of Clarksville, which was located a few miles downstream. No one was certain exactly what route the Springfield-to-Chicago road would take. Clarksville tried to attract the road by building a bridge across the Mackinaw River and the 1840 town of Pleasant Hill, which had been established just upstream from Lexington, was doing its best to attract traffic. The county began to demand taxes on the large number of unsold lots in the town; by the early 1850s over 300 Lexington lots were offered for sale to satisfy unpaid taxes. The town square was used for grazing cattle. Yet some continued to believe in the new town. Jacob Spawr (1802–1902) had moved into Lexington a year after the store had departed. He built a house of a type known as a double log pen, a dog trot, or sometimes two-pens-and-a-passage: essentially it was nothing more than two log cabins facing each other with a common roof. This building served as dwelling, post office and tavern. Because Lexington was halfway between the county seats of Pontiac and Bloomington, Spawr's house provided a convenient stopping place: Abraham Lincoln and Stephen Douglas were frequent guests. In the 1850 United States census Spawr's occupation is listed as "landlord". By 1854 it was estimated that there were only about a dozen families in Lexington.

=== The railroad comes to Lexington ===
On 4 July 1854 the railroad, which would soon be known as the Chicago and Alton, reached Lexington. Suddenly everything changed. A grain warehouse which had been built by Thomas Kincaid was hauled across the tracks, given a passenger platform, and put to use as a railroad station. Dawson and McCurdy built a grain elevator. Three denominations erected churches. The town formed its own government; their first act was to buy up the stock of the two local whiskey sellers and pour the contents of the bottles into the mud of Main Street. The Mahan brothers built a downtown windmill. A new hotel was built. Lexington boomed. By 1865 the first brick block had been erected. On 21 November 1860, the train brought Abraham Lincoln to Lexington, where he spoke a few words of goodbye to his old friends; on 2 May 1865, just before noon, another train passed through Lexington, this one holding Lincoln's body.

=== People v. Chicago and Alton Railroad Company ===
The town of Lexington soon became the focus of a case that would change American legal history. Soon after railroads began servicing the Midwest, it became evident that, if a railroad could unilaterally set its own freight rates, it could soon drain most of the wealth from nearby farmers. The result, in Illinois, was a new state constitution that in 1870 gave the government a role in setting railroad and warehouse rates; the wording and legal arguments behind this part of the new constitution was the work of Bloomington lawyer Reuben Moore Benjamin (1833–1917). A test case was needed, and Benjamin settled on Lexington. The Chicago and Alton Railroad only charged four dollars and thirty five cents to ship 1,000 board feet (2 m^{3}) of lumber from Chicago to Bloomington, but asked for five dollars to ship the same amount of lumber the shorter distance from Chicago to Lexington. In 1871 Benjamin brought suit against the railroad. The railroad responded that it was forced to charge less to ship lumber to Bloomington because there was more competition there than at Lexington. The case worked its way up to the United States Supreme Court where People v. The Chicago and Alton Railroad Company became part of the celebrated Granger Cases, named for the Granges of the Patrons of Husbandry, a group that had argued for rate regulation. These cases, at least for a time, established the right of governments to regulate corporations.

=== President Roosevelt comes to Lexington ===
Of all the events in the history of Lexington, perhaps the best remembered was the day President Theodore Roosevelt came to town. By the afternoon of 15 July 1902, a crowd of twenty thousand people had gathered near the Chicago and Alton tracks. A long grandstand had been erected and covered in red, white and blue. The Chief Executive and hero of San Juan Hill shook hands with the reception committee, but declined to leave the train. Roosevelt gave a brief but rousing talk from the observation platform at the back of the train. The crowd roared its approval. It was the only time a sitting president had visited the town.

=== Lexington and Route 66 ===
Transportation was always the key to the success of Lexington. The city got its start as a rest stop on the Chicago Trail, which was part of the larger Pontiac Trail between Chicago and St. Louis. The very first mention of Lexington's name in the press in 1836 included mention of the town's location on the stagecoach road between Springfield and Chicago. Lexington's success as a town was later assured when it became a railroad station between Springfield and Chicago. During the twentieth century, rail traffic slowly declined and was replaced by road traffic. By World War II, only two trains a day stopped at Lexington, and all passenger traffic by rail ended in 1946.

In 1915, a paved road along the former stagecoach route, which almost exactly paralleled the Chicago and Alton Railroad rail line, reached Lexington. This paved road was known as State Bond Route 4 or SBI 4, and it followed the Pontiac Trail between Chicago and St. Louis. In November 1926, there was a general renumbering of state highways following the creation of the U.S. Route System, and Route 4 became Route 66. For the next 50 years, Lexington was a popular stopping point on this famous American road. In 1955, U.S. Route 66 was locally widened to four lanes, as a partially divided highway with a grass median between the northbound and southbound lanes along much of its stretch. U.S. Route 66 served the community until 1978, when Interstate 55, which also closely paralleled the old highway, was opened to traffic and Route 66 was thereafter decertified. However, near Lexington, much of the old highway may still be driven, as the 1955 roadbed of the southbound lanes was retained as a two-lane county road (the disused northbound lanes remain nearby).

== Geography ==
According to the 2010 census, Lexington has a total area of 1.33 square miles (3.44 km^{2}), all land.

== Demographics ==
Historical population
Census	Pop.	Note	%±
1880	1,254		—
1890	1,187		−5.3%
1900	1,415		19.2%
1910	1,318		−6.9%
1920	1,301		−1.3%
1930	1,292		−0.7%
1940	1,284		−0.6%
1950	1,181		−8.0%
1960	1,244		5.3%
1970	1,615		29.8%
1980	1,806		11.8%
1990	1,809		0.2%
2000	1,912		5.7%
2010	2,060		7.7%
2020	2,090		1.5%
Decennial US Census

Lexington was laid out on 4 January 1836 By Asahel Gridley and James Brown.

=== 2020 census ===
As of the 2020 census, Lexington had a population of 2,090. The median age was 39.3 years. 25.9% of residents were under the age of 18 and 16.3% of residents were 65 years of age or older. For every 100 females there were 95.1 males, and for every 100 females age 18 and over there were 96.3 males age 18 and over.

0.0% of residents lived in urban areas, while 100.0% lived in rural areas.

There were 824 households in Lexington, of which 33.9% had children under the age of 18 living in them. Of all households, 54.9% were married-couple households, 16.1% were households with a male householder and no spouse or partner present, and 22.1% were households with a female householder and no spouse or partner present. About 26.4% of all households were made up of individuals and 11.8% had someone living alone who was 65 years of age or older.

There were 876 housing units, of which 5.9% were vacant. The homeowner vacancy rate was 1.9% and the rental vacancy rate was 6.6%.

Racial composition as of the 2020 census
Race	Number	Percent
White	1,989	95.2%
Black or African American	8	0.4%
American Indian and Alaska Native	3	0.1%
Asian	3	0.1%
Native Hawaiian and Other Pacific Islander	0	0.0%
Some other race	6	0.3%
Two or more races	81	3.9%
Hispanic or Latino (of any race)	26	1.2%

=== 2000 census ===
As of the census of 2000, there were 1,912 people, 760 households, and 550 families residing in the city. The population density was 1,820.3 inhabitants per square mile (702.8/km^{2}). There were 803 housing units at an average density of 764.5 per square mile (295.2/km^{2}). The racial makeup of the city was 98.95% White, 0.10% African American, 0.21% Native American, and 0.73% from two or more races. Hispanic or Latino of any race were 0.42% of the population.

There were 760 households, out of which 35.7% had children under the age of 18 living with them, 58.4% were married couples living together, 11.1% had a female householder with no husband present, and 27.6% were non-families. 24.6% of all households were made up of individuals, and 10.3% had someone living alone who was 65 years of age or older. The average household size was 2.52 and the average family size was 3.00.

In the city, the population was spread out, with 26.9% under the age of 18, 7.5% from 18 to 24, 29.0% from 25 to 44, 24.3% from 45 to 64, and 12.3% who were 65 years of age or older. The median age was 37 years. For every 100 females, there were 96.3 males. For every 100 females age 18 and over, there were 92.0 males.

The median income for a household in the city was $46,146, and the median income for a family was $54,336. Males had a median income of $40,031 versus $24,917 for females. The per capita income for the city was $20,898. About 3.1% of families and 4.4% of the population were below the poverty line, including 6.6% of those under age 18 and 5.1% of those age 65 or over.

== Schools and sports ==
John Patton Log Cabin and the Lexington Community Unit School District 7 campus, including Lexington High School, are located in Lexington

== Notable people ==
- Alice Ambrose, (1906–2001) philosopher at Smith College 1964–1972
- Gilbert L. Deavers, (1931–2006), born in Lexington; Illinois state representative
- Odus Creamer Horney, U.S. Army brigadier general
- Ed Kinsella, (1880–1976) MLB pitcher for the Pittsburgh Pirates and St. Louis Browns
- William R. Roy, (1926–2014) congressman from Kansas 1971–1975
- Arthur J. Scrogin (1853–1926), born in Lexington, Illinois state representative and farmer
- Joseph L. Settles, (1871–1943) one of the founding fathers of Tau Kappa Epsilon
- John A. Sterling, (1857–1918), born in Lexington, congressman 1903–1913 and 1915–1918
- Alex Tanney, (1987), football coach and former professional quarterback.
