= Hector M. Grant =

American doctor and politician (1829–1905)

Hector McNeil Grant (May 1829 – 6 April 1905) was a medical doctor, councilman, mayor, and state legislator in Arkansas. He served in the Arkansas Senate. He owned a drugstore on First Street in Helena, Arkansas.

He was born in Christian County, Kentucky. He graduated from McKendree College in Lebanon, Illinois and Louisville Medical College. He established a medical practice in La Fayette, Kentucky.

In 1850, he moved to Helena, Arkansas where about 200 people lived. He prepared to lead troops in the Civil War but was injured in a riding accident. He served in the Arkansas Senate in 1866–1867 and again in 1880 and was re-elected in 1882.

In 1866 he represented Phillips County, Arkansas and Monroe County, Arkansas. In 1882 H. M. Grant served in the Arkansas Senate from Phillips and Lee counties.

He chaired the Committee on Memorials and the Internal Improvement Committee in 1870.

He was a member of the Episcopal Church.

His son Hector M. Grant served as Page in the Arkansas Senate in 1870. Judge A. M. Grant was his brother.
