= Frank M. Bridges =

American politician

Member of the Illinois Senate from the 37th district
- In office 1882 – 1885
- Preceded by: Maurice Kelly
- Succeeded by: Robert H. Davis

Personal details
- Born: July 27, 1834 Greene County, Illinois
- Died: March 20, 1885 (aged 50)
- Party: Democratic
- Profession: Farmer

Francis M. Bridges (July 27, 1834 – March 20, 1885) was an American politician from Illinois. Born to one of the early families of Greene County, Illinois, Bridges was raised there and studied at Shurtleff College. He then worked at a store in Missouri, rising to its partnership. After a brief foray out west, Bridges returned to Greene County to farm. He was elected to the Illinois House of Representatives in 1878, then to the Illinois Senate in 1882.

== Biography ==
Francis "Frank" M. Bridges was born in Greene County, Illinois, on July 27, 1834. His parents, Archibald and Dorleska (Eldred), were among the first settlers of the county, owning a large 600-acre (240 ha) tract of land. Bridges was raised there and helped manage the farm until he was twenty-two. He also attended public schools in Carrollton, Illinois, until that age. He then matriculated at Shurtleff College in Alton, Illinois. Upon graduation, Bridges left for Memphis, Missouri, where he worked as a clerk in a dry goods store. He became a partner two or three years later and the firm became known as Bridges & Billups.

In 1862, the partnership dissolved and Bridges sold the remaining goods. He then invested this money in horses and re-sold them in California. He remained in the state for a year, managing a hotel. Bridges moved to Virginia City, Nevada, to run a quartz mill. Two years later, in September 1864, Bridges returned to Memphis, then returned to Greene County to support his mother. After helping her for two years, Bridges purchased an 85-acre (34 ha) tract of land nearby and built his own house. He stayed there for five years, until his mother died. Bridges purchased the estate of his siblings and moved onto the large family farm, where he stayed for the rest of his life.

Bridges became involved in local politics and was elected Green County sheriff on November 21, 1874. After a four-year term, he was elected as a Democrat to the Illinois House of Representatives, where he served a two-year term. Bridges was elected to the Illinois Senate in 1882, but died before his four-year term was complete.

Bridges married Lena Hudnall on October 11, 1860. They had six children, three surviving to adulthood: Helen, Archibald, and Jessie. Bridges died on March 20, 1885, after a bout of paralysis. At the time of his death, he owned 245 acres (99 ha) in Greene County. He was buried in Carrollton City Cemetery.
