= LeRoy Heminger =

American football coach and college athletics administrator (1914–1977

Biographical details
- Born: May 31, 1914; Scottville, Michigan, U.S.
- Died: March 27, 1977 (aged 62); Franklin, Indiana, U.S.
- Education: Franklin (BA); Indiana (MS)

Coaching career (HC unless noted)

Football
- 1946–1948: Shurtleff
- 1949–1952: Franklin (IN)

Basketball
- c. 1941–1949: Shurtleff
- 1963–1969: Emmerich Manual HS (IN)

Administrative career (AD unless noted)
- 1938–1941: Paoli HS (IN)
- 1946–1949: Shurtleff
- 1969–1977: Emmerich Manual HS (IN)

Head coaching record
- Overall: 26–29–4 (college football)

LeRoy Frederich Heminger (May 31, 1914 – March 27, 1977) was an American football coach and college athletics administrator. He served as the head football coach at Shurtleff College in Alton, Illinois from 1946 to 1948 and Franklin College in Franklin, Indiana from 1949 to 1952. Heminger was the athletic director at Paoli High School in Paoli, Indiana from 1938 until 1941, when he was hired by Shurtleff College. He also coached basketball and track at Shurtleff before he was hired in 1949 by Franklin College to coach football, baseball, and golf.

Heminger was a graduate of Peru High School and Franklin College. He died on March 27, 1977, at Johnson Country Memorial Hospital in Franklin.

Hemminger served in the United States Navy and became a lieutenant (junior grade).

== Head coaching record ==
=== College football ===
| Year | Team | Overall | Conference | Standing | Bowl/playoffs |
|---|---|---|---|---|---|
Shurtleff Pioneers (Independent) (1946)
| 1946 | Shurtleff | 4–2–3 | | | |
Shurtleff Pioneers (Pioneer Conference) (1947–1948)
| 1947 | Shurtleff | 6–3 | 2–1 | 2nd | |
| 1948 | Shurtleff | 4–4 | 2–1 | 2nd | |
| Shurtleff: | | 14–9–3 | 4–2 | | |
Franklin Grizzlies (Hoosier Conference) (1949–1952)
| 1949 | Franklin | 3–4–1 | 2–3–1 | T–5th | |
| 1950 | Franklin | 2–7 | 1–5 | 8th | |
| 1951 | Franklin | 2–6 | 1–5 | T–6th | |
| 1952 | Franklin | 5–3 | 4–2 | T–2nd | |
| Franklin: | | 12–20–1 | 8–15–1 | | |
| Total: | | 26–29–4 | | | |
