= Ascochyta agropyrina =

Scientific classification
- Domain: Eukaryota
- Kingdom: Fungi
- Division: Ascomycota
- Class: Dothideomycetes
- Order: Pleosporales
- Family: Didymellaceae
- Genus: Ascochyta
- Species: A. agropyrina

Binomial name
- Ascochyta agropyrina (Fairm.) Trotter

Species of fungus

Ascochyta agropyrina is a species of fungus belonging to the family Didymellaceae.
