= John Patton Log Cabin =

Historic house in Illinois, United States

- U.S. National Register of Historic Places
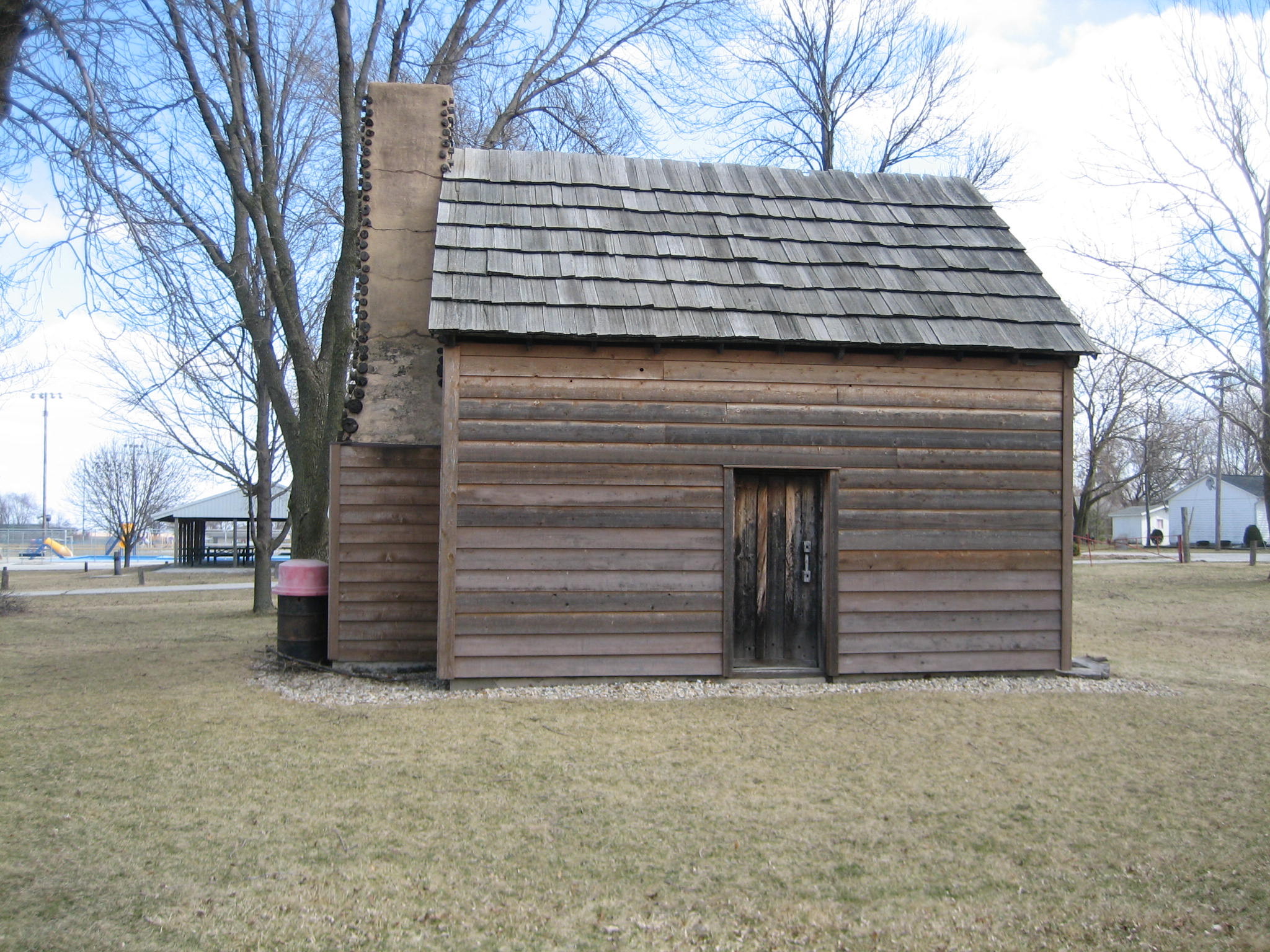

- Location within Illinois Location within the United States
- Location: Lexington Park District Park, Lexington, Illinois
- Coordinates: 40°38′55″N 88°46′48″W
- Area: less than one acre
- Built: 1829
- Built by: John Patton
- Architectural style: Log Construction
- NRHP reference No.: 86002008
- Added to NRHP: August 1, 1986

The John Patton Log Cabin is a log home located in Lexington Park District Park in Lexington, Illinois. The home was built in 1829 by John Patton, an early settler of McLean County. Patton, who was originally from Switzerland County, Indiana, came to a Kickapoo village in the area; he built his cabin with the tribe's assistance three months after his arrival. After McLean County was incorporated in 1831, the cabin became one of its first polling places. The cabin is now the only surviving early government building in the county as well as the only remnant of European interactions with Native Americans. Members of the community decided to preserve the cabin and worked with The City of Lexington to have the cabin moved to its current location and repaired in 1969. Its currently a museum.

The building was added to the National Register of Historic Places on August 1, 1986.
