= Amos E. Benbow =

American politician (1850–1922)

Member of the Illinois House of Representatives
- In office 1905–1906

Personal details
- Born: Amos Edward Benbow; February 20, 1850 near Alton, Illinois, U.S.
- Died: November 14, 1922 (aged 72) Alton, Illinois, U.S.
- Party: Democratic
- Education: Shurtleff College
- Occupation: Politician, educator, businessman

Amos Edward Benbow (February 20, 1850 – November 14, 1922) was an American politician, teacher, and businessman.

Benbow was born near Alton, Illinois. He went to the Madison County, Illinois public schools and to Shurtleff College. Benbow taught school and was involved with the real estate business. Benbow served as mayor of Upper Alton, Illinois and was involved in the Democratic Party. He served as a deputy United States Marshal, assessor, collector, and as a justice of the peace. Benbow served in the Illinois House of Representatives in 1905 and 1906. Benbow died in Alton, Illinois from a long illness lasing three years.
