= Lexington Community Unit School District 7 =

School district in McLean County, Illinois, United States

Address
- 100 East Wall Street Lexington, Illinois, 61753; United States

District information
- Type: Public
- Grades: PreK–12
- NCES District ID: 1722710

Students and staff
- Students: 494

Other information
- Website: www.lexington.k12.il.us

Lexington Community Unit School District 7 is a unified school district in Lexington, Illinois, United States. All three of its school levels (grade, junior high, and high school) are one campus.

== Junior high ==
Extra-cirrcicular activities in junior high include Builders Club and Math Team. Sports are boys baseball, girls basketball, boys basketball, cheerleading, girls volleyball, and boys and girls track.

== See also ==
- Lexington High School (Illinois) — high school program at Lexington Schools
- John A. Sterling — Lexington superintendent 1881–1883; Congressman 1903–1913 and 1915–1918
