= Arthur J. Scrogin =

American politician

Arthur Judson Scrogin (August 23, 1853–August 19, 1926) was an American farmer and politician. He was born in Lexington, Illinois and went to Shurtleff College. He served on the McLean County Board of Supervisors and was chairman of the county board. He was a Republican. He served in the Illinois House of Representatives from 1897 to 1903. He died at his home in Lexington.
