= Gilbert L. Deavers =

American politician, teacher, and businessman

Gilbert L. Deavers (February 28, 1931 – December 15, 2006) was an American politician, teacher, and businessman.

Deavers was born in Lexington, Illinois. He served in the United States Army during the Korean War. He received his bachelor's degree from Illinois Wesleyan University and his master's degree from the University of Illinois at Urbana–Champaign. Deavers taught at Normal Community High School, in Normal, Illinois, and was a football coach. He also was an insurance and financial planner and lived in Bloomington, Illinois. Deavers was involved in the Republican Party. Deavers served in the Illinois House of Representatives from 1973 to 1979. Deavers died at his home in Blowing Rock, North Carolina.
