= Alex Tanney =

American football player and coach (born 1987)

Indianapolis Colts
- Title: Offensive passing game coordinator

Personal information
- Born: November 11, 1987 (age 39); Lexington, Illinois, U.S.
- Listed height: 6 ft 4 in (1.93 m)
- Listed weight: 220 lb (100 kg)

Career information
- Position: Quarterback (No. 11, 3)
- High school: Lexington
- College: Monmouth College
- NFL draft: 2012: undrafted

Career history

Playing
- Kansas City Chiefs (2012); Dallas Cowboys (2013)*; Cleveland Browns (2013); Tampa Bay Buccaneers (2014)*; Tennessee Titans (2014–2015)*; Buffalo Bills (2015)*; Indianapolis Colts (2015)*; Tennessee Titans (2015–2017); New York Giants (2018–2020)
- * Offseason or practice squad member only

Coaching
- Philadelphia Eagles (2021) Offensive quality control coach; Philadelphia Eagles (2022) Assistant quarterbacks coach & offensive assistant; Philadelphia Eagles (2023) Quarterbacks coach; Indianapolis Colts (2024–present) Offensive passing game coordinator

Awards and highlights
- Melberger Award (2009)

Career NFL statistics
- Passing attempts: 15
- Passing completions: 11
- Completion percentage: 71.4%
- TD–INT: 1–0
- Passing yards: 100
- Passer rating: 113.2
- Stats at Pro Football Reference

Alex Tanney (born November 11, 1987) is an American football coach and former quarterback who serves as the offensive passing game coordinator for the Indianapolis Colts of the National Football League (NFL). He played college football for the Monmouth Fighting Scots and signed as an undrafted free agent with the Kansas City Chiefs in 2012. Tanney was also a member of the Dallas Cowboys, Cleveland Browns, Tampa Bay Buccaneers, Tennessee Titans, Buffalo Bills, Colts, and New York Giants before retiring in 2020.

Tanney began his coaching in 2021 as an offensive quality control coach with the Eagles under head coach Nick Sirianni.

== Early life ==
Tanney was a three-sport high school standout athlete at Lexington High School in Lexington, Illinois, where he finished as the school's all-time leading point scorer. He was a two-time first-team Illinois All-State quarterback and led his team to the IHSA state semi-finals his senior year. Tanney was also named an All-State basketball player. As a junior and senior, he placed at the IHSA State Track and Field Finals.

== College career ==
Tanney broke nearly every school record during his time at Monmouth College. As a freshman in 2007, his career began when he threw for 2,678 yards and 24 touchdowns.

As a sophomore in 2008, Tanney broke the school record of single-season touchdown passes with 50.

As a junior in 2009, Tanney collected 3,856 passing yards, 44 passing touchdowns and a rushing score, which led him to be named the Melberger Award winner as NCAA D-III's top player. Tanney was responsible for more than 24 points per game, while also averaging 350.55 passing yards and 348.73 total yards per contest.

Tanney redshirted during the 2010 season, with a shoulder injury he suffered in the second game against Grinnell College.

In February 2011, Tanney became famous after posting in YouTube a football trick-shot video that went viral. In July, History Channel's Stan Lee's Superhumans filmed an episode featuring him.

As a senior, Tanney came back and threw for a career-high 3,867 yards along with 38 touchdowns. On October 29, 2011, in a game against Carroll University, he set the NCAA record for all-time all-division career touchdown passes with 150, surpassing Jimmy Terwilliger's record of 148.

Tanney finished his collegiate career with 157 touchdown passes and has the second most passing yards in NCAA D-III history with 14,249. He won three Midwest Conference Offensive Player of the Year Awards along with numerous All-American Awards.

== Professional career ==
=== Kansas City Chiefs ===
Tanney signed a contract with the Kansas City Chiefs as an undrafted free agent on June 5, 2012. He was placed on injured reserve with a finger injury on September 1.

=== Dallas Cowboys ===
On July 21, 2013, the Dallas Cowboys signed Tanney to their roster. On August 4, he played the entire second half of the Hall of Fame Game in Canton, Ohio. On August 29, Tanney played all but one series in the 24–6 loss against the Houston Texans, where he posted 17-of-31 completions for 177 yards and an interception while being sacked seven times. In five preseason games, Tanney completed 40-of-73 attempts for 423 yards, a touchdown, and two interceptions. He was released on August 30, but was signed to the Cowboys' eight-player practice squad two days later.

=== Cleveland Browns ===
On November 26, 2013, the Cleveland Browns signed Tanney off the Cowboys' practice squad. On May 12, 2014, Tanney was released.

=== Tampa Bay Buccaneers ===
Tanney was signed by the Tampa Bay Buccaneers on May 20, 2014. He was released on August 24.

=== Tennessee Titans (first stint) ===
On December 16, 2014, Tanney was signed to the practice squad of the Tennessee Titans. He signed a futures contract with the Titans on December 29.

Tanney was released on September 5, 2015.

=== Buffalo Bills ===
Tanney was signed to the practice squad of the Buffalo Bills on September 7, 2015. Tanney was dropped from the practice squad a day later, after the team re-signed Matt Cassel.

=== Indianapolis Colts ===
Tanney signed to the practice squad of the Indianapolis Colts on September 29, 2015. He was released on October 20. Tanney re-signed to the practice squad on November 10.

=== Tennessee Titans (second stint) ===
On December 21, 2015, Tanney was signed off the Colts practice squad by the Titans. He made his NFL regular-season debut on January 3, 2016, against the Colts, relieving the injured Zach Mettenberger in the third quarter and going 10-for-14 for 99 yards and throwing his first and only career touchdown to Dorial Green-Beckham. Tanney became the first Division III quarterback to appear in an NFL game.

On September 13, 2016, Tanney was waived by the Titans and was re-signed to the practice squad the next day. On December 27, he was promoted to the active roster to back up Matt Cassel.

On September 2, 2017, Tanney was placed on injured reserve. On April 30, 2018, he was released.

=== New York Giants ===
On May 2, 2018, Tanney signed with the New York Giants. He was named on the Giants’ 53-man roster on September 1 as the primary backup to Eli Manning.

On March 4, 2019, Tanney signed a two-year contract extension with the Giants. He was released on October 10, 2019, but was re-signed the next day.

Tanney was placed on the active/non-football illness list by the Giants at the start of training camp on July 28, 2020, and moved back to the active roster six days later. On September 5, Tanney was released. On December 5, he was signed to the practice squad. Tanney signed a reserve/future contract on January 4, 2021.

=== Retirement ===
On February 9, 2021, Tanney announced his retirement.

=== NFL statistics ===
| Year | Team | Games | | Passing | | | | | | | | Rushing | | | |
| Year | Team | GP | GS | Cmp | Att | Pct | Yds | Avg | TD | Int | Rtg | Att | Yds | Avg | TD |
|---|---|---|---|---|---|---|---|---|---|---|---|---|---|---|---|
| 2015 | TEN | 1 | 0 | 10 | 14 | 71.4 | 99 | 7.1 | 1 | 0 | 114.9 | 0 | 0 | 0.0 | 0 |
| 2019 | NYG | 1 | 0 | 1 | 1 | 100.0 | 1 | 1.0 | 0 | 0 | 79.2 | 0 | 0 | 0.0 | 0 |
| Career | | 2 | 0 | 11 | 15 | 73.3 | 100 | 6.7 | 1 | 0 | 113.2 | 0 | 0 | 0.0 | 0 |

== Coaching career ==
=== Philadelphia Eagles ===
In 2021, Tanney was hired by the Philadelphia Eagles as an offensive quality control coach under head coach Nick Sirianni. In 2022, Tanney was promoted to assistant quarterbacks coach and offensive assistant coach.

On February 28, 2023, Tanney was promoted to quarterbacks coach, replacing Brian Johnson, who was promoted to offensive coordinator.

On January 26, 2024, Tanney requested permission, which was granted by the Eagles, to pursue another coaching job with another team and stated that he had opportunities elsewhere. The Eagles were giving their coaching staff an overhaul for the 2024 season and had recently fired offensive coordinator Brian Johnson.

=== Indianapolis Colts ===
On February 7, 2024, Tanney was hired by the Indianapolis Colts to serve as the team's offensive passing game coordinator.
