= Elizabeth Anne Sueltenfuss =

American college president

Sister Elizabeth Anne Sueltenfuss CDP
- Born: Caroline Marie Sueltenfuss; April 14, 1921; San Antonio, Texas, United States
- Died: December 19, 2009 (aged 88); San Antonio, Texas, US
- Burial place: Sisters of Divine Providence Cemetery, San Antonio, Texas
- Education: Our Lady of the Lake College (BA, 1944, botany and zoology); University of Notre Dame MS (PhD, 1963, microbiology)
- Occupation: College President
- Employer: Our Lady of the Lake University

Elizabeth Anne Sueltenfuss (April 14, 1921 – December 19, 2009) was an American educator and Catholic sister. She was the fourth president of Our Lady of the Lake University.

== Early life and education ==
Caroline Marie Sueltenfuss was born on April 14, 1921, in San Antonio, Texas. Her parents were Elizabeth (née Amrein) and Edward L. Sueltenfuss, a farmer. Her father died when she was young. She grew up in her maternal grandfather's house in San Antonio.

She attended Our Lady of the Lake College (now Our Lady of the Lake University). She entered a religious life in 1939 and became a Sister of Divine Providence as Sister Elizabeth Anne in 1941. She graduated from Our Lady of the Lake College in 1944 with a BA in botany in zoology.

She received a Master's and PhD in microbiology from the University of Notre Dame in 1963. She completed her postgraduate studies at the University of New Hampshire, the University of Pittsburgh Medical School, the University of Texas, and the University of Texas Medical Branch.

== Career ==
In 1945, Suelterfuss taught at high schools in Louisiana and Oklahoma. She joined the faculty of the biology department of Our Lady of the Lake College in 1949, later becoming head of the department. She taught virology and microbiology. She was a faculty advisory and member of honor society Sigma Zeta's Sigma chapter, serving as national vice-president from 1964 to 1965 and as national president from 1965 to 1966.

While still teaching at Our Lady of the Lakes, she became a research associate at Southwest Research Institute in 1965. Suelterfuss was the first woman and fourth person to serve as president of Our Lady of the Lake University, taking office in 1978. She oversaw OLLU's introduction of a weekend college program in the late 1970s, giving working people accesses to a college education. Following her resignation in 1997, she held the title of OLLU president emerita.

During her career in education, she was treasurer and director of the Independent Colleges and Universities of Texas, as well as director of the Association of Texas Colleges and Universities. She was the chair of the executive committee of the Texas Independent College Fund and treasurer and executive committee member of the Hispanic Association of Colleges and Universities. She belonged to the American Institute of Biological Sciences.

== Honors ==
Sueltenfuss was awarded the Yellow Rose of Texas Education Award by the Constance Allen Guild for Lifetime Learning. She received the Brotherhood Award of the National Conference of Christians and Jews, the Ford Foundation's Salute to Education Award, the JCPenney Spirit of the American Woman Award, the San Antonio Express-News Lifetime Achievement Award, and the Women in Communications Headliner Award for Professional Achievement.

She was inducted into the San Antonio Women's Hall of Fame in 1985, and served as president of the organization from 1993 to 1995. In September 2000, the Sueltenfuss Library at Our Lady of the Lake University was dedicated in her honor. Sueltenfuss was posthumously inducted into the Texas Women's Hall of Fame on January 17, 2019, at a ceremony in Austin. In 2019, she was inducted into the Hispanic Association of Colleges and Universities Hall of Champions.

== Personal life ==
She was a member of the San Antonio chapter of Zonta International. She was a board member of the American Cancer Society, Army and Air Force Community Councils, Free Trade Alliance of San Antonio, San Antonio Chamber of Commerce, and San Antonio Library Foundation. She was a member of the board of visitors of Air Force Institute of Technology.

Suelterfuss died on December 19, 2009, in San Antonio at the age of 88. She was buried in Sisters of Divine Providence Cemetery in San Antonio.
