= McKendree University =

Private university in Lebanon, Illinois, US

- Former names: Lebanon Seminary (1828–1830); McKendree College (1830–2007)
- Motto: Artium Morum et Religionis Disciplinae
- Motto in English: The Disciplines of the Arts, of Morals and of Religion
- Type: Private university
- Established: 1828; 198 years ago
- Religious affiliation: United Methodist Church
- Endowment: $34.7 million
- President: Daniel C. Dobbins
- Provost: Tami Eggleston
- Faculty: 92 full-time
- Administrative staff: 191
- Students: 1,960 (Fall 2022)
- Undergraduates: 1,534 (Fall 2022)
- Postgraduates: 426 (Fall 2022)
- Location: Lebanon, Illinois, U.S. 38°36′25″N 89°48′55″W
- Campus: Suburban 235 acres (95 ha)
- Colors: Purple and white
- Nickname: Bearcats
- Sporting affiliations: NCAA Division II – GLVC; CWPA
- Mascot: Bogey
- Website: mckendree.edu
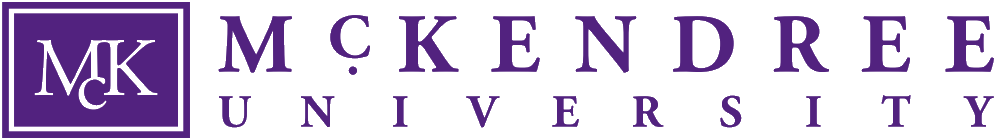

McKendree University (McK), formerly McKendree College, is a private university in Lebanon, Illinois, United States. Founded in 1828 as the "Lebanon Seminary", it is the oldest college or university in Illinois. The school was renamed McKendree University beginning in the 2007–08 academic year. McKendree enrolls approximately 1,960 students representing 25 countries and 29 states. In the undergraduate program, on average, there are 51% females and 49% males. The institution remains affiliated with the United Methodist Church.

== History ==
Established by pioneer Methodists, McKendree is the oldest university in the state of Illinois and continues to have ties to the United Methodist Church. First called "Lebanon Seminary", the school opened in two rented sheds for 72 students in 1828 under Edward Raymond Ames. In 1830, Bishop William McKendree, the first American-born bishop of the Methodist church, permitted the board of trustees to change the institution's name to "McKendree College". Later Bishop McKendree deeded 480 acres (194.2 ha) of land in Shiloh, Illinois to endow the college. Reverend Peter Akers, in 1833, was the first president of the newly named college. He was president of McKendree College three times and received its first degree, an honorary Doctorate of Divinity. In 1835, the college received one of the first charters granted to independent church colleges by the Illinois legislature. The institution still operates under the provisions of a second, more liberal charter obtained in 1839.

Since 1994 and the installation of its former president James M. Dennis, the institution has significantly increased its enrollment. In 2001, the college embarked on a capital campaign which raised more than $20 million for the campus including the creation of a performing arts center, the Russel E. and Fern M. Hettenhausen Center for the Arts, also known as The Hett. In 2004, McKendree offered its first graduate programs in addition to its existing undergraduate programs.

== Academics ==
McKendree University confers degrees from four colleges and schools and offers over 50 undergraduate majors, 45 minors, and master's degrees in four areas: business administration, criminal justice, education, nursing, and clinical mental health counseling. McKendree also offers a doctoral program in education, with the opportunity for teachers and administrators to earn a specialist degree. The university is classified as Master's colleges and universities (Master's/L) by the Carnegie Classification of Institutions of Higher Education.

In 2015, U.S. News & World Report's 2015 "Best Colleges" edition ranks McKendree University in the top tier of Midwest regional universities. In addition, McKendree has full accreditation from the Higher Learning Commission (HLC) of the North Central Association of Colleges and Schools. McKendree has been fully accredited by the North Central Association of the Higher Learning Commission since 1915 and received its ten-year renewal in 2003–2004. McKendree's School of Education is fully accredited by the National Council for Accreditation of Teacher Education (NCATE). McKendree's School of Nursing and Health Professionals is accredited by the Commission on Collegiate Nursing Education (CCNE).

The university offers associate degrees, bachelor's degrees, master's degrees, and a doctoral degree through its four schools:

- College of Arts and Sciences
- School of Business
- School of Education
- School of Nursing and Health Professions

More than 50% of the classes have fewer than 14 students. McKendree's student-to-faculty ratio is 14 to 1. More than 90% of the faculty have earned a Ph.D. or higher.

McKendree University is host to chapters representing a number of honor societies and academic fraternities including:

- Alpha Phi Omega
- Alpha Psi Omega
- Alpha Kappa Delta
- Iota Tau Alpha
- Kappa Delta Pi
- Kappa Kappa Psi
- Kappa Sigma Tau
- Lambda Pi Eta
- Sigma Theta Tau
- Phi Alpha Theta
- Phi Beta Lambda
- Phi Eta Sigma
- Phi Kappa Phi
- Pi Gamma Mu
- Pi Kappa Delta
- Pi Sigma Alpha
- Psi Chi
- Sigma Beta Delta
- Sigma Tau Delta
- Sigma Zeta
- Upsilon Pi Epsilon

== Lebanon campus ==
McKendree University's main campus is located on a wooded 235 acres (95 ha) in Lebanon, Illinois, about 25 minutes from downtown St. Louis, Missouri.

The campus is laid out in roughly a rectangle bordered by Stanton Street and College Hill Cemetery to the west and Monroe St. to the east. North Alton St. and Summerfield St. bisect the campus and are the main roads for vehicular traffic on campus.

The university opened the Russel E. and Fern M. Hettenhausen Center for the Arts (the Hett) in September 2006. The $10 million, 34,400-square-foot (3,200 m^{2}) theater includes practice and storage space for the McKendree University band, choral department and faculty offices. The Hett includes a full-size stage with a 500-seat auditorium.

The Marion K. Piper Academic Center (PAC) is the student union, which is the center of the campus, with the library located directly to the northwest of it. All academic buildings are located in the southwestern sections of the campus.

=== Residence halls ===
Student housing is provided along the north-central and northeastern areas of the campus. McKendree offers three different types of residence halls: traditional dorm style, suite style, and apartment style. Traditional-style halls are predominantly freshmen and are co-ed by floor. The residence halls are served by the Ames Dining Hall, located between Baker Hall and Walton Hall.

Traditional style halls:

- Baker Hall
- Barnett Hall
- Walton Hall

Suite-style halls:

- Residence Hall East
- Residence Hall West
- The Suites

Apartment-style halls:

- McKendree West
- University Commons
- Triplex
- Hunter Street

The suite-style and apartment-style halls are predominantly upperclassmen; freshmen are not allowed to live in McKendree West Apartments. Suite-style residence halls are located in a 70-student complex on the eastern edge of campus called The Suites. The suites are co-ed by suite and include three bedrooms, one bathroom, and a common area. McKendree West Apartments are the university-owned apartment-style residence housing option. McKendree West houses approximately 380 students and is co-ed by apartment. They are located a half mile from the main campus. The university offers a shuttle service to transport residents to and from McKendree West, called the Bogey Bus after McKendree's mascot, Bogey the Bearcat.

On October 23, 2010, the university held a groundbreaking ceremony for two new residence halls. The new 75,000-square-foot (7,000 m^{2}) residence halls are designed in a modern glass-and-brick style of architecture to blend with other modern buildings on campus as well as the many historic brick buildings. Each new hall is a three-story structure connected by a two-floor glass bridge. The new residence halls tentatively named "New Residence Hall: East" and "New Residence Hall: West" were completed in time for the 2011–2012 academic year. Due to this addition, McKendree University was able to recruit their largest first-year enrollment in 185 years: class of 2017.

== Athletics ==
The McKendree athletic teams are called the Bearcats. The university is a member of NCAA Division II, after completing the transitioning process from the National Association of Intercollegiate Athletics (NAIA) in July 2013. The university competed as an Independent during the 2011–12 academic year (in NCAA D-II play) before becoming a member of the Great Lakes Valley Conference (GLVC) for the 2012–13 academic year as a provisional NCAA member.

Prior to joining the NCAA, McKendree was a member of the Illinois Intercollegiate Athletic Conference (IIAC) from 1912–13 to 1937–38. They were in the NAIA as members of the American Midwest Conference (with the exception of football where they played in the Midwest League of the Mid-States Football Association (MSFA) from 1987–88 to 2010–11.

McKendree competes in 39 intercollegiate varsity sports: Men's sports include baseball, basketball, bowling, cross country, football, golf, ice hockey (DI and DII), powerlifting, rugby, soccer, swimming & diving, tennis, track & field (indoor and outdoor), volleyball, water polo and wrestling; while women's sports include basketball, beach volleyball, bowling, cross country, golf, ice hockey, lacrosse, powerlifting, rugby, soccer, softball, swimming & diving, tennis, track & field (indoor and outdoor), volleyball, water polo and wrestling; and co-ed sports include bass fishing, cheerleading and dance.

== Alumni ==
- Henry P. H. Bromwell, Fayette County Judge, Presidential Elector, U.S. House Representative to Illinois, Grand Master of the Grand Lodge of Illinois.
- Leon Milton Birkhead, Unitarian minister and anti-fascist propagandist
- Lanece Clarke, Olympic sprinter
- Matt Cole, professional football player
- Hector M. Grant, doctor, state legislator, and Mayor of Helena, Arkansas
- William Hyde, journalist
- Andrew Sanchez, professional mixed martial artist
- Nathan Scarritt, educator, pastor, and real estate dealer
