= Reuben W. Coon =

American politician

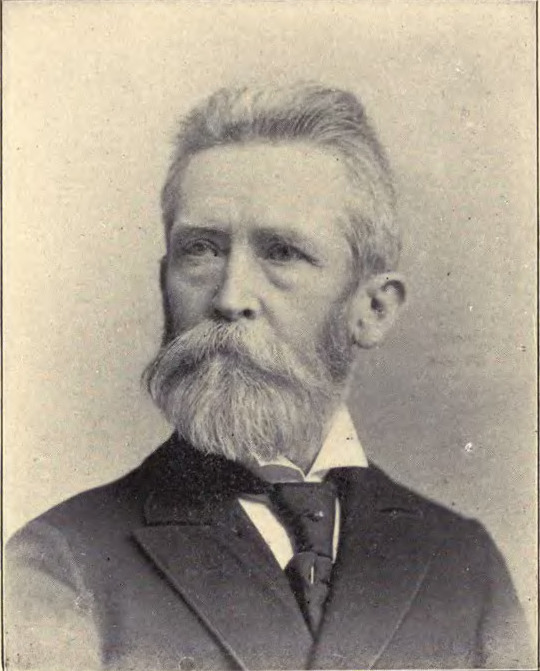
- Born: 31 May 1842
- Died: 18 February 1908 (aged 65)
- Occupation: Politician
- Position held: member of the State Senate of Illinois

Reuben W. Coon (May 31, 1842–February 18, 1908) was an American lawyer, newspaper editor, and politician.

Coon was born in Frankfort, Indiana. He went to Shurtleff College and was admitted to the Illinois bar. Coon had lived in Pana, Illinois, and eventually settled in Waukegan, Illinois, with his wife and family. He owned The Waukegan Gazette and the Belvidere Northwestern newspapers. He also served as state's attorney for Boone County, Illinois. Coon served in the Illinois Senate from 1893 to 1897 and was a Republican. Coon died at his home in Waukegan, Illinois from heart failure.
