= Anthony Daly (cricketer) =

Australian cricketer (born 1969)

Tony Daly
Personal information
- Full name: Anthony John Daly
- Born: 25 July 1969 (age 57); Newcastle, New South Wales, Australia
- Batting: Right-handed
- Role: Batsman

Domestic team information
- Years: Team
- 1994/95–1996/97: Tasmania
- FC debut: 9 December 1994 Tasmania v New South Wales
- Last FC: 6 December 1996 Tasmania v Victoria
- LA debut: 12 February 1995 Tasmania v Western Australia
- Last LA: 3 February 1996 Tasmania v Queensland

Career statistics
Competition	First-class	List A
Matches	13	6
Runs scored	579	34*
Batting average	26.31	36.00
100s/50s	0/2	0/0
Top score	70	72
Catches/stumpings	7/–	4/–
- Source: CricketArchive, 14 August 2010

Anthony "Tony" John Daly (born 25 July 1969) is an Australian former cricketer who played for Tasmania. He was born at Newcastle, New South Wales in 1969.
