= Sigma Zeta =

American honor society for STEM

- ΣΖ
- Founded: October 1, 1925; 101 years ago Shurtleff College
- Type: Honor
- Affiliation: Independent
- Status: Active
- Emphasis: Natural sciences, computer science, and mathematics
- Scope: North America
- Colors: Blue and White
- Publication: The Sigma Zetan
- Chapters: 65
- Graduation medal
- Headquarters: 1400 East Hanna Avenue; Indianapolis, Indiana 46227; United States
- Website: www.sigmazeta.org

Sigma Zeta (ΣΖ) is a North American honor society founded in 1925 to recognize undergraduate excellence in the natural sciences, computer science, and mathematics. The society's purpose is to encourage and foster the attainment of knowledge in the natural and computer sciences and mathematics. It has chartered more than eighty chapters in the United States and Canada.

== History ==
Sigma Zeta was founded in the fall of 1925 at the now defunct Shurtleff College in Alton, Illinois as a local coeducational organization to provide recognition for Shurtleff science and mathematics students. Its founders were Professor Elmer E. List of the biology department, J. Ellis Powell of the math department; and Ralph K. Calteton, of the chemistry department. They selected the name Sigma Zeta and drafted a constitution and initiation ceremony on October 1, 1925.

A second chapter, Beta, was chartered at McKendree College in 1926. The society held its first conclave in June 1926.

Soon after that other local campuses took an interest in the group, and following the approval of the petition by McKendree College to start a chapter in June 1926 Sigma Zeta began its growth into a national collegiate honor society. In a letter that appeared in the correspondence section of the American Chemical Society Journal of Chemical Education Sigma Zeta was offered as an alternative for small colleges to the existing Sigma Xi honor society which often passed over small colleges for membership as they focused on larger Universities.

Sigma Zeta's annual convention has been held every year since 1926 except for 1943, 1944, and 1945 when it was canceled due to World War II, and in 2020 when it was canceled due to the COVID-19 Pandemic. The first three gatherings were held at the Shurtleff College campus which is now the site of the Southern Illinois University School of Dental Medicine.

Sigma Zeta became an international organization in 2024 with the chartering of a Gamma Phi chapter at St. Mary’s University in Calgary, Alberta, Canada.

== Symbols ==
Sigma Zeta's badge is a gold key, shaped like an open book, with the Greek letters ΣΖ above various scientific symbols. The associate member's pin is blue and white enamel, with the Greek letters ΣΖ.

The colors of Sigma Zeta are blue and white. Its publication is The Sigma Zetan.

== Activities ==
The annual convention is Sigma Zeta's primary meeting where student members present papers and individual and chapter awards are presented. Individual chapters often undertake activities including the hosting of speakers and service projects to benefit their local communities. These activities can include programs for younger students at local schools helping to promote science education at early ages.

In 1947, the three Sigma Zeta members presented the Founders Cup which is awarded to a chapter at each annual convention for papers presented.

Sigma Zeta's interdisciplinary nature has been described as a benefit for smaller colleges and universities because, "It brings together students from all areas of science and mathematics, including computer science, so they can all work together on projects."

== Membership ==
Chapters select students for membership who have met the following eligibility criteria:

- Major studies in at least one of the Natural Sciences, Computer Science, or Mathematics
- Completion of 25 semester hours of coursework with 15 hours in the Natural Sciences, Computer Science, or Mathematics
- A Grade Point Average of 3.0 out of 4.0 both in Science and Mathematics as well as cumulatively among all classes taken

== Chapters ==
As of 2026, Sigma Zeta has chartered more than eighty chapters in the United States and Canada.

== Notable members ==
- Elizabeth Anne Sueltenfuss, president of Our Lady of the Lake University
