= Anthony W. Daly =

American lawyer and politician (1904–1960)

Anthony W. Daly (September 27, 1904 – December 17, 1960) was an American judge, lawyer, and politician.

Daly was born in Alton, Illinois. He graduated from Saint Louis University School of Law in 1930 and was admitted to the Illinois bar. He practiced law in Alton and served as the Alton city attorney. Daly served as the probate judge for Madison County, Illinois and as master in chancery for Madison County. Daly served in the Illinois House of Representatives in 1941 and 1942 and was a Democrat. He also taught at the Saint Louis University School of Law and at Shurtleff College. Daly died at St. Anthony Hospital in Alton, Illinois following a heart attack at his office.
