= Reuben Moore Benjamin =

American jurist (1833–1917)

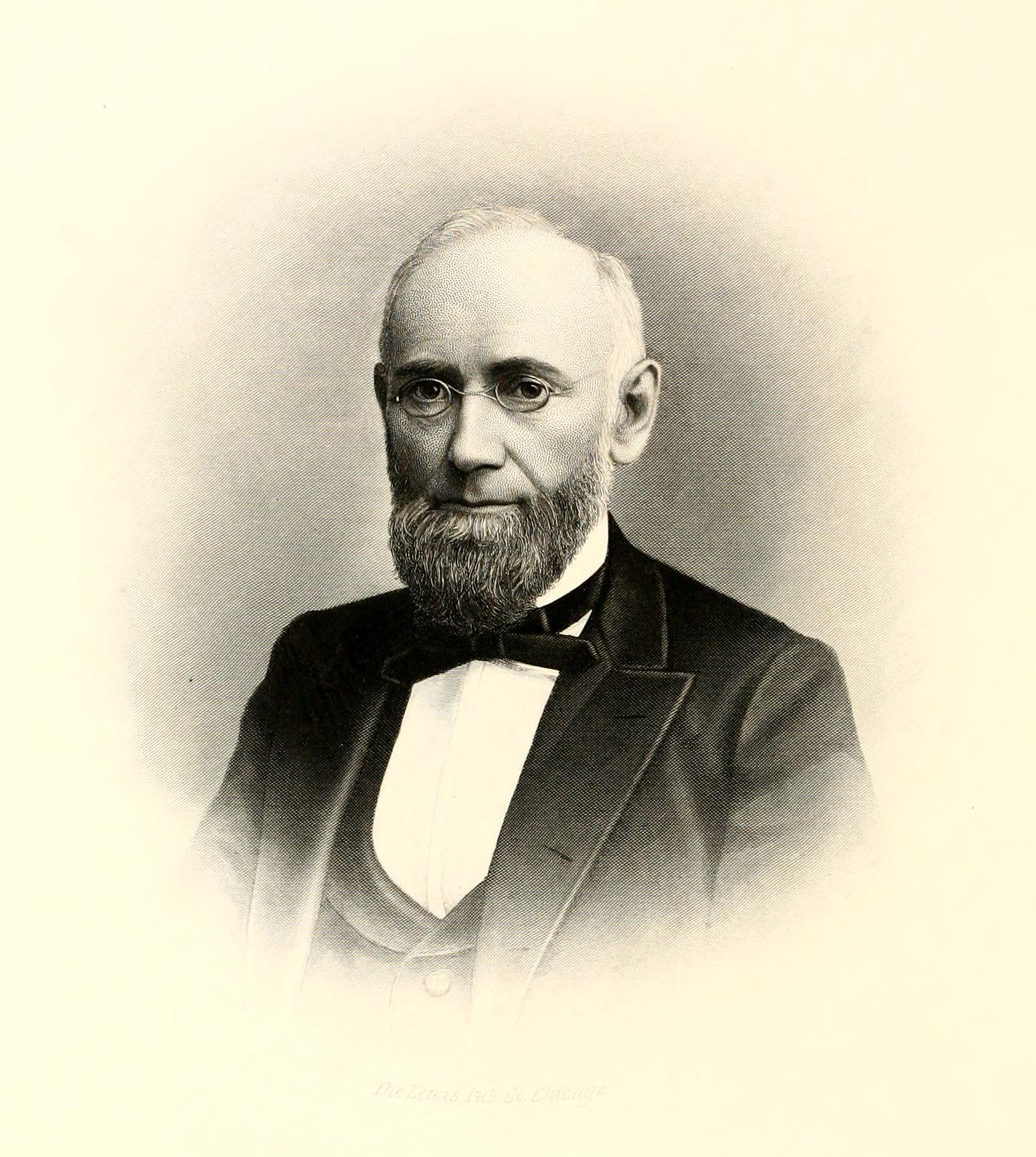
- Reuben Moore Benjamin circa 1896
- Born: June 29, 1833; Chatham
- Died: August 4, 1917 (aged 84); Bloomington

Reuben Moore Benjamin (June 29, 1833 – August 4, 1917) was an American jurist. Benjamin practiced as a lawyer in Bloomington, Illinois, before his appointment as a county court judge for McLean County. He became the dean of Illinois Wesleyan University's law school in 1874. In practice, Benjamin was counsel in several cases called the "Granger cases" about states' constitutional authority to regulate railways.

== Early life and education ==
Reuben Moore Benjamin was born on June 29, 1833, on a farm near Chatham, New York. His parents, Martha (Rogers) and Darius Benjamin, were both natives of Chatham. His father was a soldier in the War of 1812, and his grandfather, Ebenezer Benjamin, was a captain in the Continental Army.

He attended Kinderhook Academy (in Kinderhook, New York) and graduated from Amherst College in 1853. He was principal of Hopkins Academy in Hadley, Massachusetts, from 1853 to 1854. He attended Harvard Law School between 1854 and 1855 and was a tutor at Amherst from 1855 to 1856.

== Career ==
In 1856 he was admitted to the bar and began practicing law in Bloomington, Illinois, where he lived from then on.

In 1869 he was elected a member of the Illinois constitutional convention of 1869–70 and wrote a version of the Illinois bill of rights.

Between 1873 and 1886, he was a county court judge in McLean County. Between 1874 and 1891, he was dean of the law school at Illinois Wesleyan University.

Benjamin died on August 4, 1917, in Bloomington.

== Granger cases ==
Benjamin was counsel in several cases called the "Granger cases". These cases established the constitutional power of state legislatures to regulate railroad and warehouse charges.

Benjamin was counsel for Illinois in Chicago & Alton Railroad Company v. Illinois, which was about whether railroad corporations could charge more depending on the distance traveled. He was later special counsel to the state board of railroad and warehouse commissioners, and assisted the attorney general a related case, Munn v. Illinois. On appeal, Munn was affirmed by the Supreme Court of the United States.

== Works ==
- Students' Guide to Elementary Law (1879)
- Principles of the Law of Contract (1889)
- The General Principles of the American Law of the Sale of Goods (1901)
