= Solex College =

Private college

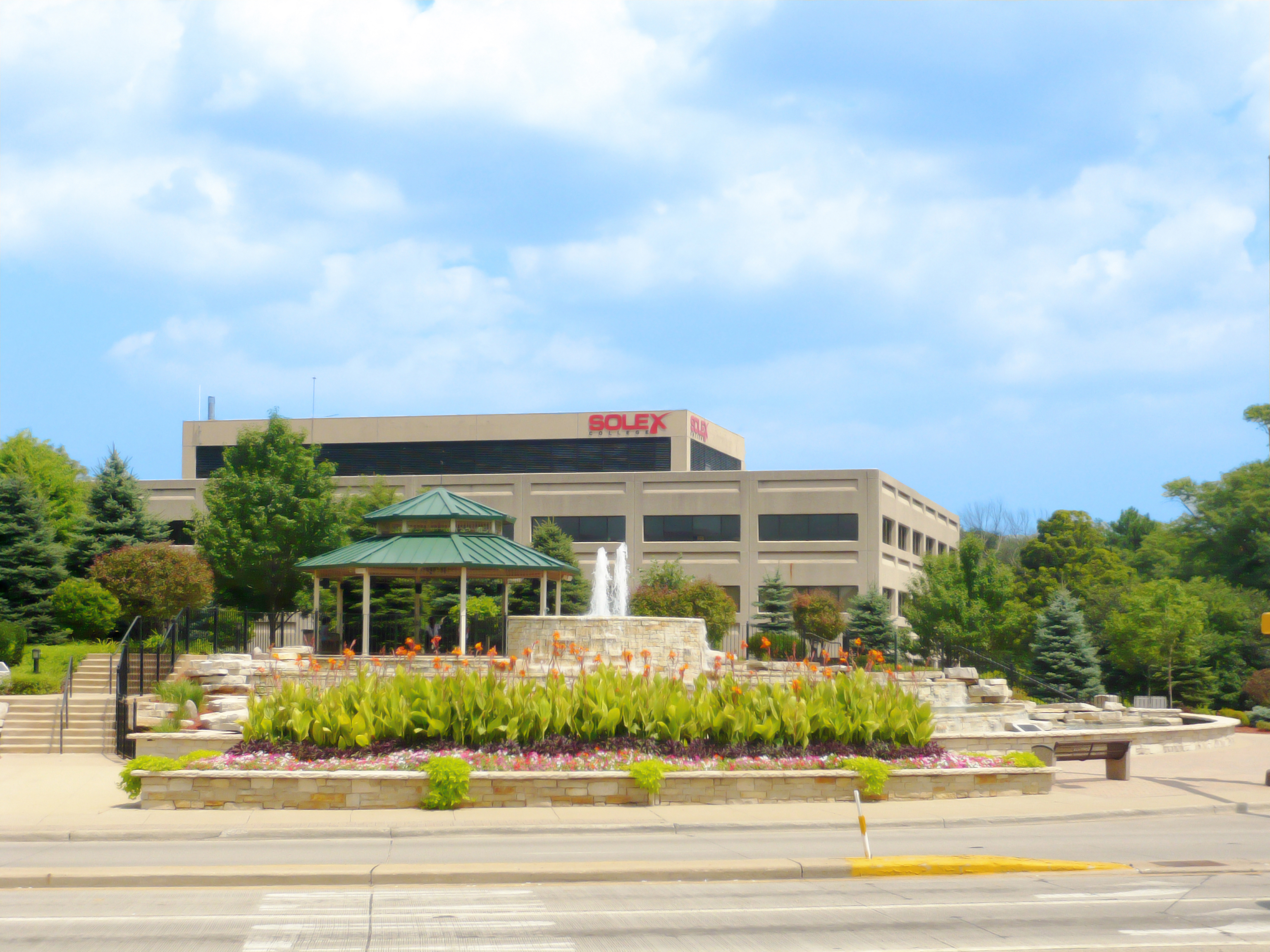
- Motto: Learn Today. Earn Tomorrow.
- Type: Private, For-profit
- Active: 1995–2018
- Faculty: 60
- Location: Chicago, Illinois, United States
- Campus: Solex Wheeling
- Colors: Maroon Black
- Website: www.solex.edu/en
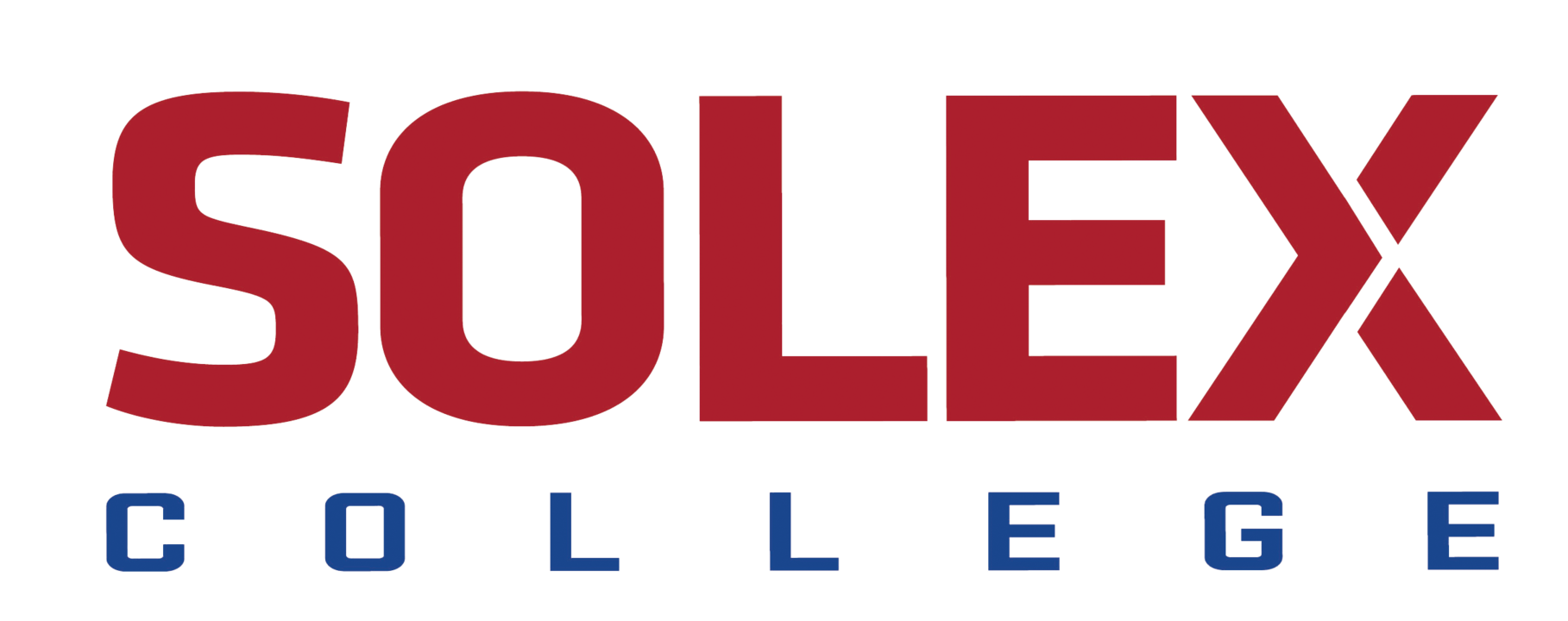

Solex College was a private for-profit college from 1995 to 2018 in Chicago, Illinois, United States. The Illinois Board of Higher Education serves as the custodian of records for the college following the its closure.

The college enrolled over 2,000 students (2013-2014) and was one of the largest schools in the Chicago area to enroll international F-1 visa students for its intensive English as a Second Language programs. SOLEX’s main administration building was located in Wheeling, Illinois.

== Accreditation ==
SOLEX College was accredited by Accrediting Council for Independent Colleges and Schools (ACICS). The A.A.S. in Physical Therapist Assistant Program at SOLEX College was accredited by the Commission on Accreditation in Physical Therapy Education (CAPTE).

== History ==
In 1995, SOLEX Computer Academy was launched as a private for-profit business and vocational school and was authorized to operate through the Illinois State Board of Education (ISBE). In 2001, SOLEX Computer Academy became SOLEX Academy with an expanded menu of instructional programs to better respond to the training needs of students. In 2001, SOLEX Academy was authorized under federal law to enroll nonimmigrant alien students. Currently, foreign students from more than 60 countries attend SOLEX College. SOLEX is an authorized ETS® TOEFL and TOEIC testing site.

During the next few years, the school actively expanded its list of offerings. In December 2007 SOLEX Academy was granted operational and degree granting authority by the Illinois Board of Higher Education (IBHE) to award an Associate of Applied Science (A.A.S) degree in Accounting, and the school was renamed SOLEX College.

In 2009 SOLEX College became accredited by the Accrediting Council for Independent Colleges and Schools (ACICS) to award occupational associate degrees and certificates. Later that year the school embarked on an initiative to actively respond to labor market needs and to increase medical program offerings. In July 2010 SOLEX College was approved to award the Associate of Applied Science degree in Physical Therapist Assistant.

Also in 2012, SOLEX College was granted a degree-granting authority by the Illinois Board of Higher Education to award an Associate of Applied Science (A.A.S.) degree in e-Business Management.

SOLEX’s popular A.A.S. in Physical Therapist Assistant Program became accredited by the Commission on Accreditation in Physical Therapy Education (CAPTE) in April 2014. Also in 2014, SOLEX College introduced a new Industrial Maintenance Technician program that was developed in partnership with a local renowned industrial repair company.

A 2015 audit by the Office of the Inspector General of the United States Department of Education found that SOLEX disbursed Title IV funds to ineligible ESL students, and recommended that SOLEX return $1,795,500 ($2.44 million in 2025) to the US Department of Education. SOLEX College challenged the OIG findings, filed an appeal and as a result reached the settlement agreement without further administrative litigation. The Office of Hearings and Appeals of the US Department of Education ordered the case to be dismissed on March 23, 2018.

The college closed in 2018. Subsequently the SOLEX administrators opened schools in the Western United States to continue legacy of the original institution.

The Illinois Board of Higher Education serves as the custodian of records for the college following the its closure.

== Academics ==
The college offered associate degree programs, vocational certificates, and classes for English-language learners.
