= Shurtleff College =

Baptist college in Alton, Illinois, US (1827–1957)

Coordinates: 38°54′10.2″N 90°08′37.4″W

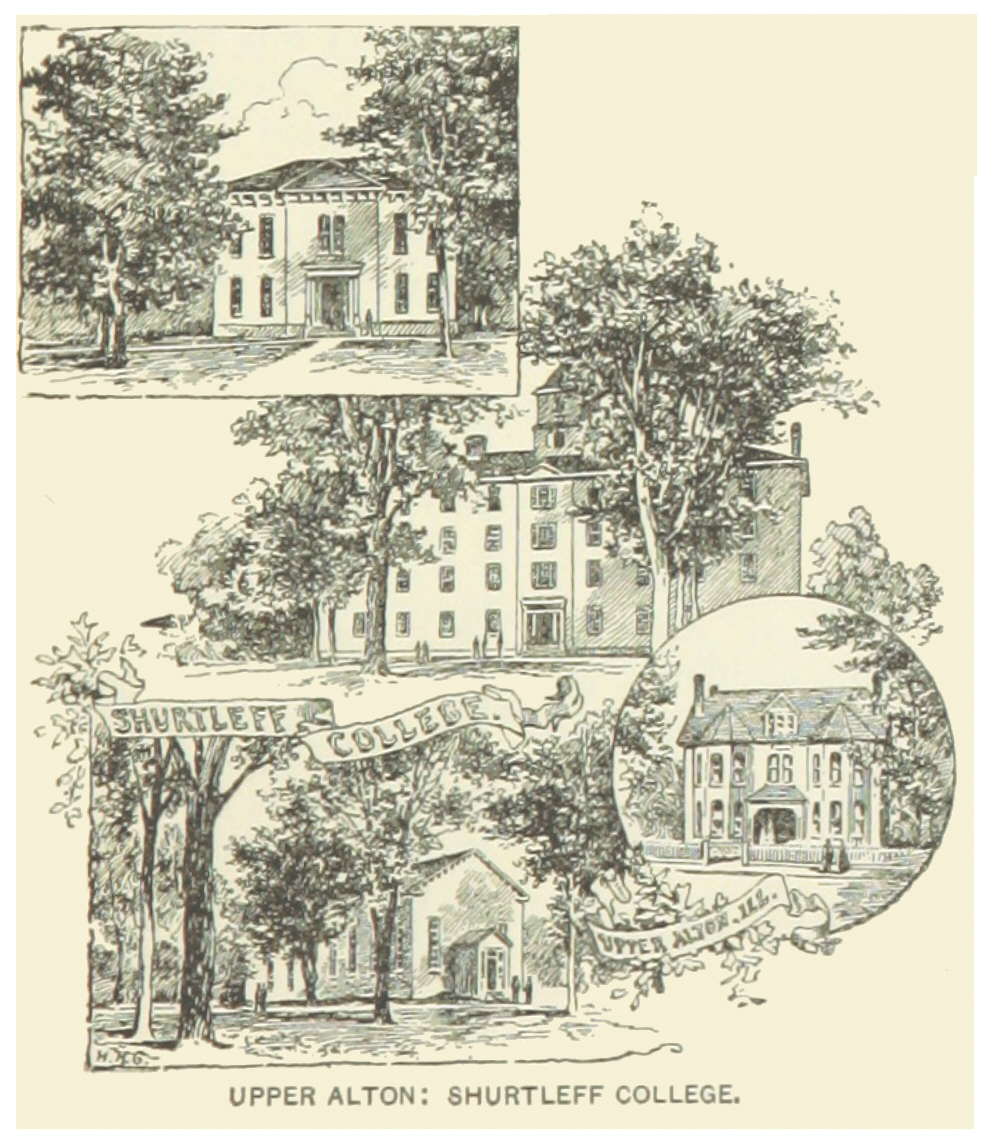
- 1891 advertisement of Shurtleff College
- Active: 1827–June 30, 1957
- Founder: John Mason Peck
- Location: Alton, Illinois
- Mascot: Pioneers

Shurtleff College was a Baptist liberal arts college in Alton, Illinois. It was founded in 1827 as the Rock Spring Seminary in St. Clair County, Illinois. It was the first college in Illinois. It moved to Alton in 1832, becoming the Alton Seminary and, later, Alton College. It became Shurtleff College in 1836 to honor a major donor. Its peak enrollment was 700 students in 1950. In 1957, it became a campus of the Southern Illinois University system.

== History ==
Founded in 1827 by Reverend John Mason Peck (a Baptist missionary) as Rock Spring Seminary in St. Clair County, Illinois, and relocated to Alton, Illinois in 1832, first as the Alton Seminary, then as Alton College, the institution was renamed again in 1836 as Shurtleff College, in honor of Benjamin Shurtleff of Boston who donated $10,000 ($293,182 in 2025) to the college. In keeping with Baptist ideas about equality, the school came to accept women as well as men, and students of all races. This institution is both the first college in Illinois and one of the first between the Alleghenies and the Mississippi River

In 1910, Andrew Carnegie donated $15,000 ($518,304 in 2025) for the construction of a library. The now national science and mathematics honor society, Sigma Zeta, was founded at Shurtleff College as a local organization to provide recognition for its science and mathematics students. In a letter that appeared in the correspondence section of the American Chemical Society's Journal of Chemical Education, Sigma Zeta was offered as an alternative for small colleges to the existing Sigma Xi honor society. It had often passed over small colleges for membership as it focused on larger universities.

In 1950, Shurtleff reached its peak enrollment of 700 students, also seeing its highest number of graduates that year, 99. The school ceased operating as Shurtleff College on June 30, 1957, when it became part of the Southern Illinois University system. Students enrolled at Shurtleff at the time continued their education; the last 28 students of Shurtleff College graduated in 1958. Shurtleff College was the oldest Baptist college west of the Appalachians until it was absorbed by Southern Illinois University.

The college's first year as an SIU campus saw a jump in enrollment to 1,200 students. In two years, the enrollment doubled. The Alton campus flourished until 1965 when SIU opened a campus at nearby Edwardsville, which became Southern Illinois University Edwardsville. In 1972, SIU decided to use the Alton campus for a branch of dental medicine. In its first year as a dental school, SIU enrolled twenty-four students. Currently, the school carries an enrollment of approximately 200.

== Athletics ==
Shurtleff College was a member of the Illinois Intercollegiate Athletic Conference from 1910–1937.

== Notable people ==
=== Alumni ===
- William Seaman Bainbridge, surgeon and gynecologist
- David J. Baker Jr. (1856), chief justice of the Illinois Supreme Court
- Frank Ballard (1952), puppeteer and professor of dramatic arts at the University of Connecticut
- Bill Beeny, Baptist minister with syndicated radio show
- Amos E. Benbow, Illinois House of Representatives
- Frank M. Bridges, Illinois Senate and Illinois House of Representatives
- George E. Coghill, philosopher anatomist and academic
- Nathan Cole, United States House of Representatives
- Reuben W. Coon, Illinois Senate
- Frank Freidel, historian, the first major FDR biographer
- Norman T. Gassette, president of the Chicago White Stockings and Clerk of the Circuit Court of Cook County
- Herbert G. Giberson, Illinois Senate
- Henry DeWitt Hamilton, Adjutant General of New York
- Charles E. Fairman, physician who published in the field of mycology
- Joseph Hamilton, professor and head football coach at Ithaca College
- Sam Harshany, professional baseball player and manager; catcher for the St. Louis Browns in the 1930s and 1940s
- Earl E. Herrin, Illinois House of Representatives
- J. Otis Humphrey, judge for the Southern District of Illinois
- Mannie Jackson, chairman and co-owner of the Harlem Globetrotters,
- Norman Foote Marsh, architect
- Harold F. Mayfield, business executive and amateur ornithologist
- Lansing Mizner, president of the California Senate; minister to Central America
- Glennon T. Moran (1939), World War II flying ace and brigadier general in the Missouri Air National Guard
- John M. Palmer, United States Senate
- Arthur J. Scrogin, Illinois House of Representatives
- Thomas Adiel Sherwood, justice of the Supreme Court of Missouri
- Louise Stallings, soprano singer
- Helen Virginia Stelle, librarian, first director of the Tampa Free Library (now the Tampa-Hillsborough County Public Library System)
- Robert Pershing Wadlow enrolled in 1938, remembered as the "Alton Giant", the tallest known human in recorded history, measuring 272 cm (8 ft 11.1 inches) in height. A statue of Wadlow stands on the former campus that was his alma mater
- Minor Watson, actor on stage and in film

=== Faculty and staff ===
- Gay Wilson Allen, associate professor for Shurtleff College
- Philip Arbuckle, football coach
- Flora Hamilton Cassel, musician, composer, and activist
- Dale E. Chadwick, head football coach
- Anthony W. Daly, Illinois House of Representatives and professor
- Paul E. Harney, artist and art professor
- LeRoy Heminger, head football coach
- Robert Everett Pattison, professor of systematic theology
- John Mason Peck, college's founder
- John R. Richards, head football coach
- John Russell of Bluffdale, professor of Greek and Latin, Baptist preacher, and novelist
- Walter W. Wood, coach and head of athletics

== See also ==
- List of colleges and universities in Illinois
- List of defunct colleges and universities in Illinois
