= Rafael Devers =

Dominican baseball player (born 1996)

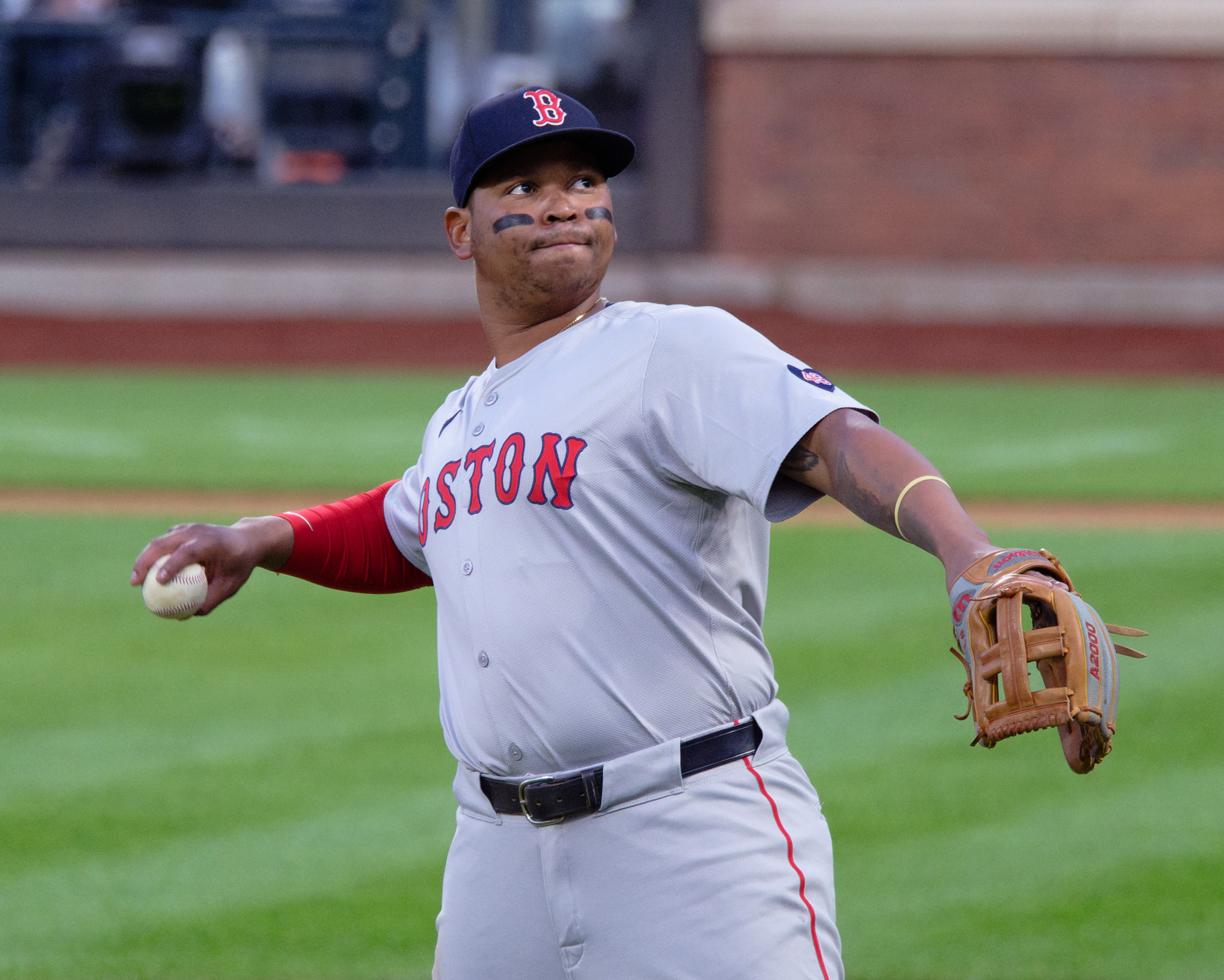
- Devers with the Boston Red Sox in 2024

San Francisco Giants – No. 16
- Infielder / Designated hitter
- Born: October 24, 1996 (age 30); Sánchez, Dominican Republic
- Bats: Left Throws: Right

MLB debut
- July 25, 2017, for the Boston Red Sox

MLB statistics (through 2026 season)
- Batting average: .274
- Home runs: 272
- Runs batted in: 845
- Stats at Baseball Reference

Teams
- Boston Red Sox (2017–2025); San Francisco Giants (2025–present)

Career highlights and awards
- 3× All-Star (2021, 2022, 2024); World Series champion (2018); 2× Silver Slugger Award (2021, 2023)

Rafael Devers Calcaño (/ˈdɛvərz/ DEV-ərz; born October 24, 1996) is a Dominican professional baseball infielder and designated hitter for the San Francisco Giants of Major League Baseball (MLB). He has previously played in MLB for the Boston Red Sox.

Devers made his MLB debut in 2017 with the Red Sox, and was a member of their 2018 World Series championship team. He is a two-time Silver Slugger Award winner and a three-time All-Star. Before the 2023 season, the Red Sox signed Devers to an eleven-year, $330 million contract extension; however, after only one full season of the contract being in force, he was traded to the Giants in June 2025.

== Career ==
=== Boston Red Sox (2013–2025) ===
==== Minor leagues ====
The Boston Red Sox signed 16-year-old free agent Devers on August 9, 2013. Devers, who ranked sixth overall among the top 50 international prospects, agreed to a $1.5 million deal. According to an MLB.com report, he was at the time considered by some scouts to be the best left-handed hitter available on the international market.

Devers made his professional debut on May 31, 2014, with the Dominican Summer League Red Sox rookie club. He batted 14-for-30 for a .467 batting average and slugged .800 in eight games. In June he continued to show his value leading the DSL Sox with a slash line of .337/.445/.538, three home runs and 21 runs batted in (RBI), walking more times (21) than he struck out (20), while playing in all 28 of the team's games thus far and had reached base in all but one. In addition, his .983 on-base plus slugging statistic was rare for the DSL level, while his .533 slugging average in this period is the highest mark for an everyday player for the Red Sox since at least 2005, which is as far back as online statistics for the DSL go. On July 3, he was promoted to the Gulf Coast League Red Sox of the Rookie Class GCL. Devers hit .372 and slugged .564 in July 22 games for the GCL Red Sox, including seven doubles, two home runs, 31 RBI, and a .438 on-base percentage. Overall, Devers finished with a .322/.404/.506 line, seven home runs, and 57 RBI, while appearing in 70 games across two minor league levels. He posted 36 RBI for the Sox, tying for third in the GCL, and also ranked among the top 10 in batting average (.312). He later contributed with a game-winning homer and three RBIs in the playoffs, as the GFL Red Sox claimed their second Championship title. Additionally, he was named to the 2014 GCL Postseason All-Stars team. He climbed from No. 13 to No. 5 in MLB.com's ranking of Red Sox prospects that season.

Devers joined the Low-A Greenville Drive in 2015, where he was selected for the South Atlantic League All-Star Game. Soon after, MLB.com announced that Devers would be a member of the World Team roster in the All-Star Futures Game. Devers was invited by the Boston Red Sox to participate on its 2016 spring training. He then was promoted to High-A Salem Red Sox to start the regular season. At the time, he was rated as the Red Sox's No. 2 prospect and No. 14 overall, according to MLB.com.

Devers started the 2017 season with the Double-A Portland Sea Dogs, where he hit .300 with 18 home runs in 77 games. On July 14, Devers was promoted to the Triple-A Pawtucket Red Sox, where he hit .400 with two home runs in nine games.

==== 2017 ====
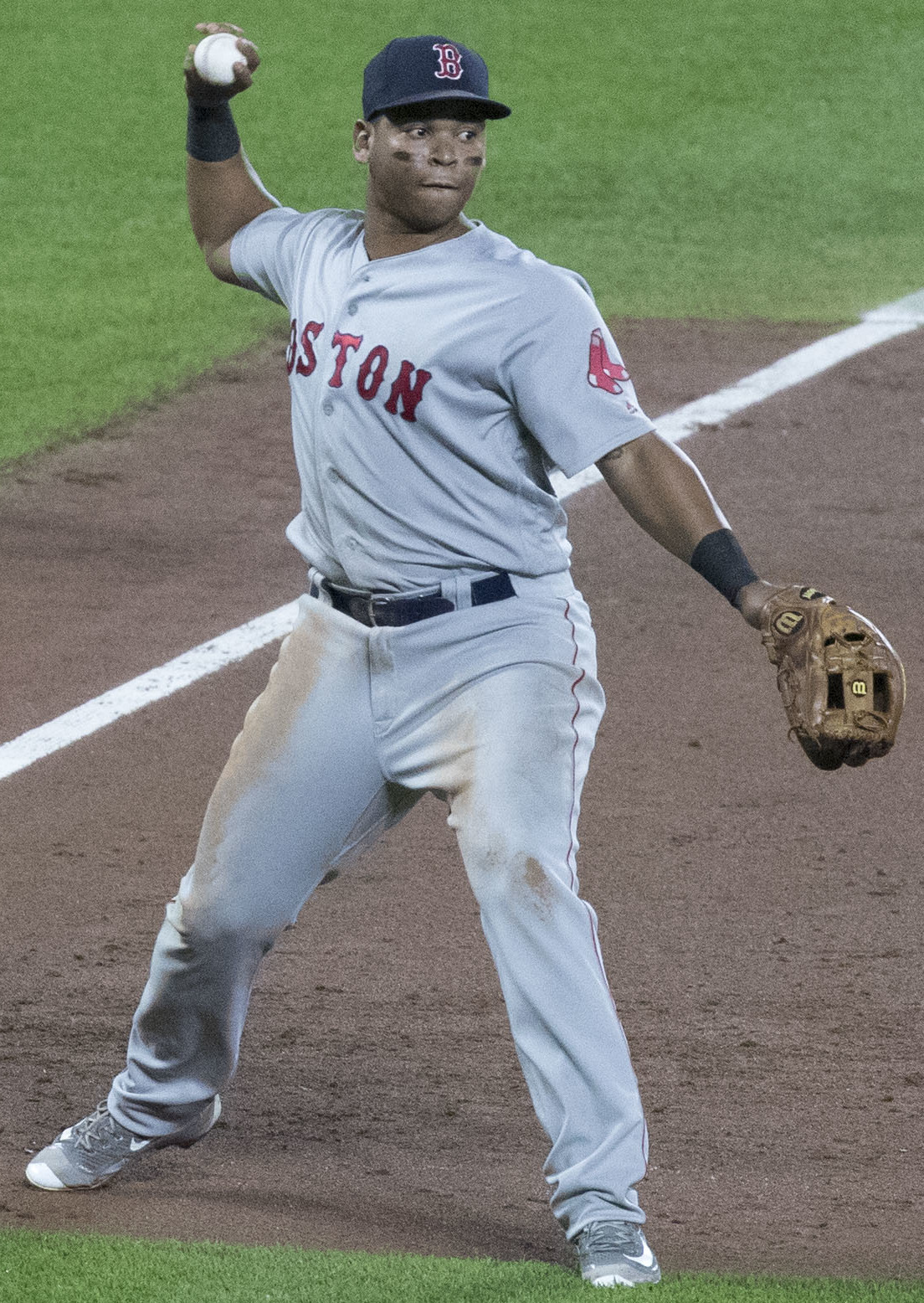
Devers with the Red Sox in 2017

On July 24, 2017, Devers was promoted to the Boston Red Sox, five days after the team released Pablo Sandoval. On July 26, Devers collected his first major league hit, a home run off of Andrew Moore of the Seattle Mariners. Devers became the youngest Red Sox player (at 20 years, 275 days old) to hit a home run since Tony Conigliaro (at 20 years, 265 days old) in 1965. On August 13, Devers hit a ninth-inning game-tying home run off of Yankees closer Aroldis Chapman. Chapman's pitch was clocked at 102.8 mph (165.4 km/h), which was the fastest pitch hit for a home run since 2008, when MLB started tracking pitch velocity. On August 15, while playing third base, Devers initiated a triple play on a ground ball hit by Yadier Molina of the St. Louis Cardinals. During the regular season, Devers appeared in 58 games with the 2017 Red Sox, batting .284 with 10 home runs and 30 RBIs. Defensively, he started 56 games at third base and had a .906 fielding percentage and was second among AL third basemen in errors with 14.

In the postseason, Devers hit a two-run home run in Game 3 of the American League Division Series (ALDS) against the eventual World Series champions, the Houston Astros, giving the Red Sox their first lead in any game of the series. Devers became the youngest Red Sox player to homer in the postseason, and only the sixth player in MLB history to hit a home run in the playoffs before his 21st birthday, joining Mickey Mantle, Andruw Jones, Miguel Cabrera, Manny Machado, and Bryce Harper. In Game 4, Devers hit an inside-the-park home run, becoming the youngest MLB player (at 20 years, 350 days old) to hit one in the postseason. During the ALDS, Devers batted 4-for-11 (.364) with two home runs and five RBIs.

==== 2018 ====
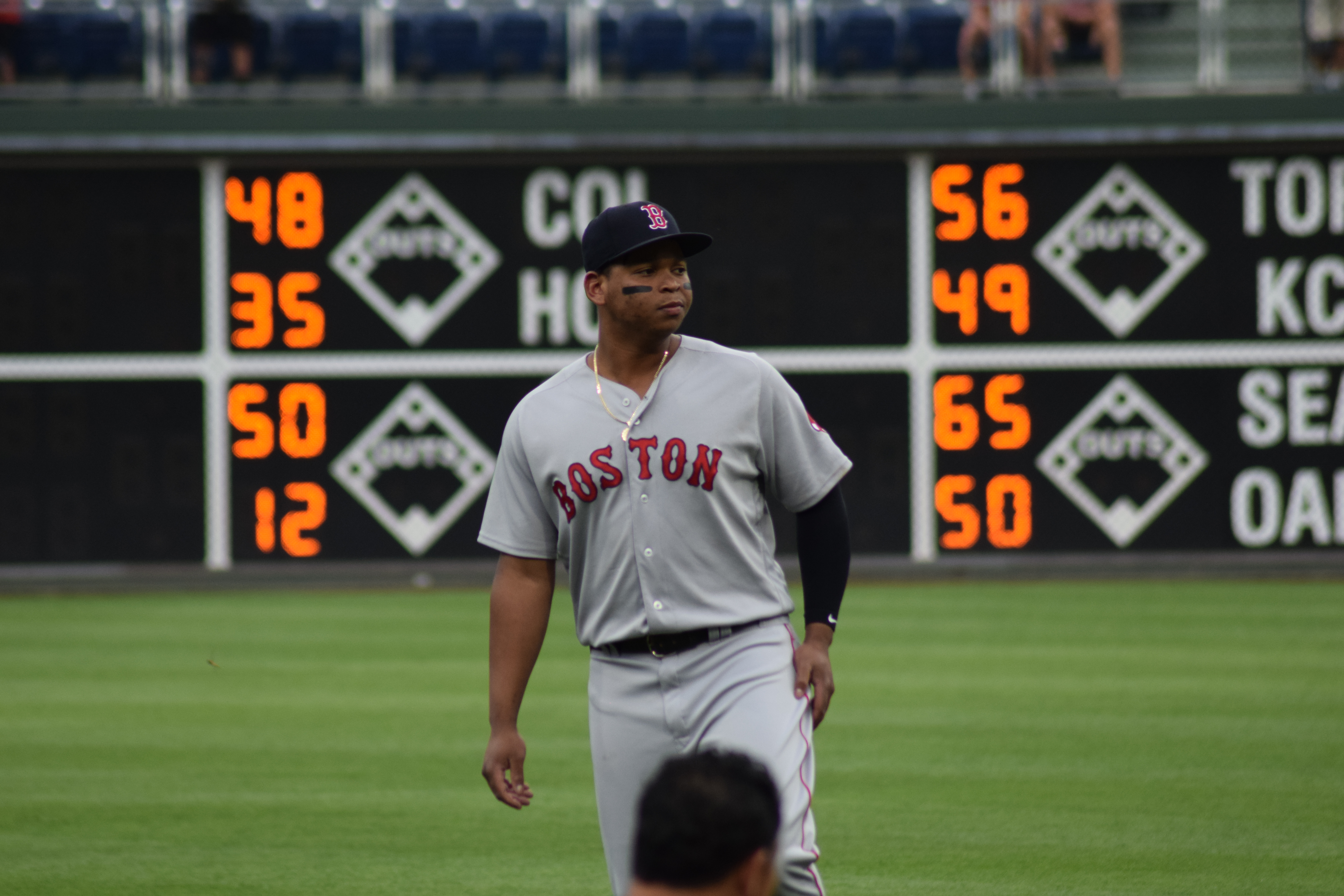
Devers in 2018

Devers began the 2018 season as Boston's regular third baseman. He hit his first career grand slam on April 18, off of Tyler Skaggs of the Los Angeles Angels. He hit his second grand slam on June 30, off of Sonny Gray of the New York Yankees. That night, Devers, who went 5-for-5, became the youngest player to hit a grand slam in a Red Sox–Yankees game, at the age of 21 years and 249 days. On July 12, he was placed on the 10-day disabled list due to left shoulder inflammation; he was activated on July 21. Devers was placed back on the disabled list on July 29, due to a left hamstring strain, and was reactivated on August 8, hitting a home run in that evening's game against the Toronto Blue Jays. Devers was again placed on the disabled list on August 17, due to his left hamstring. He was sent on a rehabilitation assignment with Triple-A Pawtucket on August 29, and returned to Boston's active roster on September 4. On September 26, Devers went 4-for-5 with 2 home runs and 6 RBIs.

During the regular season, Devers appeared in 121 games, batting .240/.298/.433 with 21 home runs and 66 RBIs. On defense, he led the major leagues in errors, with 24. He also had the lowest fielding percentage among major league third basemen, at .926. He performed much better in the postseason, becoming the fifth player to hit at least three home runs before his 22nd birthday. In Game 5 of the 2018 American League Championship Series (ALCS), Devers hit a go-ahead three-run home run in the sixth inning, helping to send the Red Sox to the World Series. In Game 4 of the World Series, Devers became the youngest player with a go-ahead RBI in the 9th inning or later of a World Series game since Édgar Rentería's walk-off single in Game 7 of the 1997 World Series. The Red Sox won the series in five games over the Los Angeles Dodgers, giving Devers his first championship title.

==== 2019 ====
Devers resumed his role as Boston's regular third baseman for 2019. On June 3, he was named the AL Player of the Month for May, having batted .351 with eight home runs during the month. In mid-July, Devers was named Boston's 2019 Heart & Hustle Award winner. On August 13, Devers became the latest MLB player to record six hits in a game; he was 5-for-5 in the first nine innings of an away game against the Cleveland Indians, and had his sixth hit in the 10th inning. In addition, Devers' four doubles in his 6-for-6 night make him the only player since 1900 to record six-plus hits with at least four doubles. On August 18, Devers became the first MLB player to record 100 RBIs during the 2019 season. He was named AL Player of the Week for the week of August 12–18. On September 21, Devers hit his 31st home run of the season, setting a new Red Sox franchise record for home runs by a third baseman in a season, passing Butch Hobson who had hit 30 in 1977. On September 29, the final day of the regular season, Devers reached the 200-hit plateau.

He finished the season with 201 hits and a .311 average, along with 54 doubles (leading the AL), 32 home runs, and 115 RBIs, and led the major leagues with 90 extra-base hits and 359 total bases. On defense, he led all major league third basemen in errors, with 22. He finished 12th in 2019 AL MVP voting.

==== 2020 ====
During the 60-game shortened regular season, Devers was again Boston's primary third baseman. Overall with the 2020 Red Sox, he batted .263 with 11 home runs and 43 RBIs in 57 games. He led all major league players (including all AL third basemen) in errors with 14, more than twice as many as any other AL third baseman, and had the lowest fielding percentage, .891, of all major league third basemen.

==== 2021 ====
On January 15, 2021, Devers and the Red Sox reached agreement on a $4.575 million one-year deal to avoid arbitration. Devers returned as Boston's primary third baseman, and on July 1 was named the AL starter at that position for the 2021 All-Star Game. On September 4, Devers hit a three-run home run against Cleveland—it was his 33rd home run of the season and gave him 100 RBIs for the second time in his career. Overall during the regular season, Devers batted .279 in 156 games with 38 home runs and 113 RBIs, as on defense he led AL third basemen in errors for the fourth straight year, while also leading all major league third basemen, with 22.

He also played in 11 postseason games, batting 13-for-44 (.295) as the Red Sox advanced to the ALCS. During Game 2 of the ALCS, both JD Martinez and Devers hit grand slams, marking the first time an MLB team had two grand slams in a playoff game. On November 11, Devers was announced as the AL recipient of the Silver Slugger Award for third basemen. He also received votes in American League MVP balloting, finishing in 11th place, and was selected as the second-team third baseman on the All-MLB Team.

==== 2022 ====
On March 23, 2022, Devers signed a $11.2 million contract with the Red Sox, avoiding salary arbitration. He was again the team's regular third baseman. In voting for the All-Star Game, Devers was selected by fans to the AL starting lineup. On July 23, he was placed on the 10-day injured list due to right hamstring inflammation. For the season, Devers batted .295 with 27 home runs and 88 RBIs in 141 games, as on defense he led AL third basemen in errors for the fifth straight year, with 14. He was also named a finalist for the Hank Aaron Award, a Silver Slugger Award, and the All-MLB Team.

==== 2023 ====
On January 3, 2023, Devers and the Red Sox agreed to a $17.5 million salary for the 2023 season. On January 11, Devers agreed to a 10-year, $313.5 million contract extension which will take effect in the 2024 season.

Across 153 games for the Red Sox in 2023, Devers batted .271/.351/.500 with 33 home runs and 100 RBI, as on defense he led AL third basemen in errors for the sixth straight year, while also leading all major league third basemen, with 19.

On November 9, Devers was announced as the AL recipient for the Silver Slugger Award at third base, his second.

==== 2024 ====
On May 20, 2024, Devers became the first player in Red Sox history to hit home runs in six consecutive games. On July 6, he recorded his 1,000th career major league hit. Devers finished the season batting .272/.354/.516 with 28 home runs and 83 RBI, as on defense he led AL third basement in errors for the seventh straight year, with 12, in 138 games played.

Through the end of the 2024 season, Devers led all active third basemen in career errors committed (141, in eight seasons), and had the lowest fielding percentage of all active third basemen who had played a minimum of 500 games (.944).

==== 2025 ====
In February 2025, after the Red Sox signed free agent third baseman Alex Bregman to a three-year, $120 million contract, Devers said he would not accept a move from third base to accommodate Bregman. However, he later relented and was moved to the role of designated hitter.

Devers started off the season 0-for-21 with 15 strikeouts, which was the most in MLB history for a player in their first five games. In May 2025, after a season-ending injury to starting first basemen Triston Casas, Devers declined the team's request for him to play first base. On May 12, Devers was named the AL Player of the Week for May 5 – May 11 after going 10-for-21 with two home runs and eight RBI. On May 17, Devers hit his first career walk-off home run off Pierce Johnson of the Atlanta Braves. On June 15, Devers recorded his final hit as a member of the Red Sox—a home-run off of Yankees starting pitcher Max Fried that also marked Devers' 500th career extra base hit.

=== San Francisco Giants (2025–present) ===
==== 2025 ====
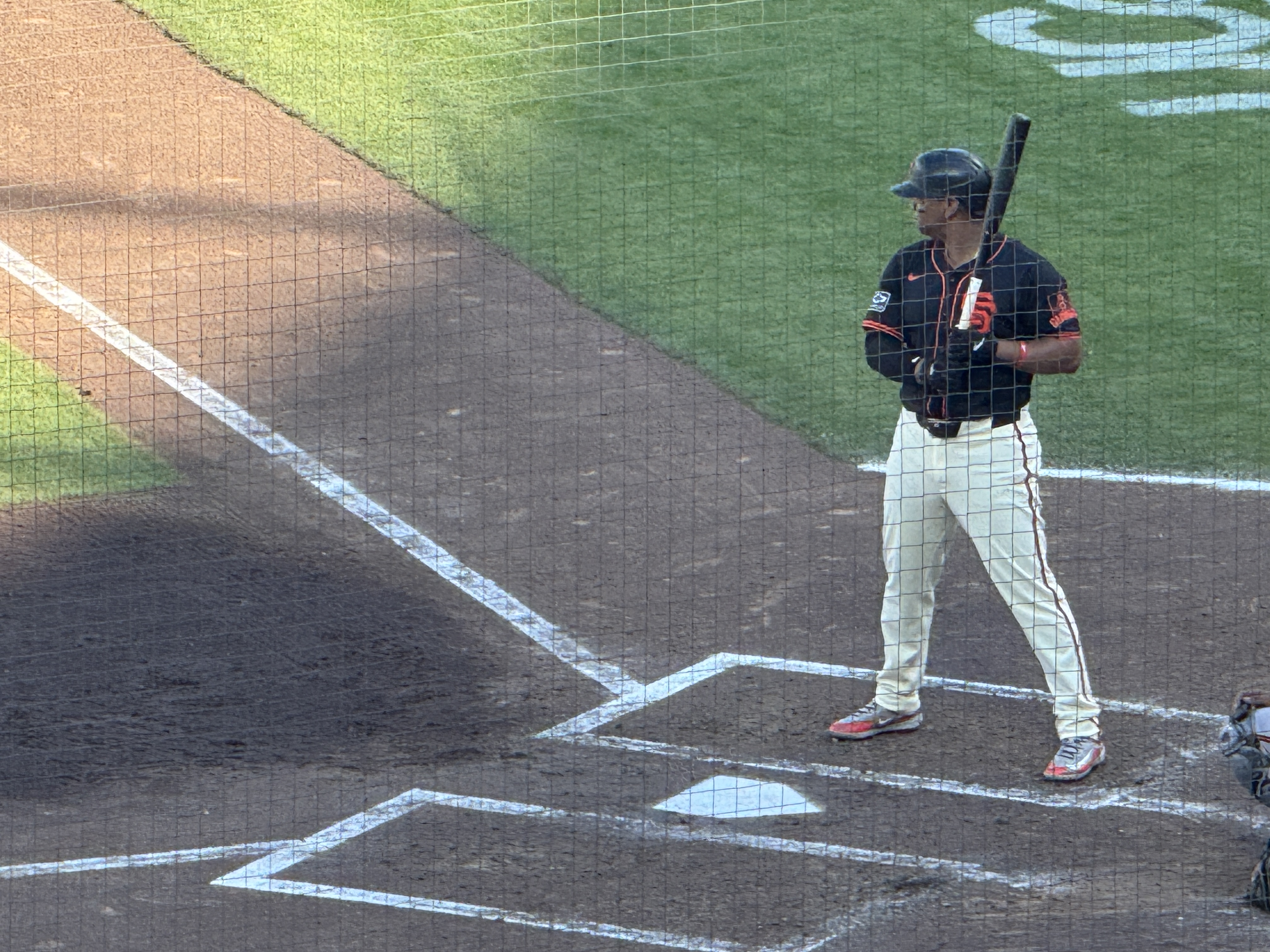
Devers with the Giants in 2025

On June 15, 2025, the Red Sox traded Devers to the San Francisco Giants in exchange for Kyle Harrison, Jordan Hicks, James Tibbs III, and Jose Bello. He made his Giants debut on June 17 as the designated hitter against the Cleveland Guardians. He went 2-for-5 with an RBI double. Devers hit his first home run as a Giant on June 21 against his former team, the Boston Red Sox off pitcher Brayan Bello in the bottom of the third inning.

On July 22, Devers debuted as a first baseman for the first time in his career, recording four putouts. On September 2, Devers was named the National League Player of the Week, co-winning with Kyle Schwarber for the 23rd week of the season after going 11-for-23 (.478) and slugging 1.513 with three home runs and ten RBI in that period, including a double and two home runs in a three-game home series against the Chicago Cubs.

Devers played in 163 regular-season games in 2025, becoming the first to do so since Justin Morneau in 2008 and the first to do so due to a trade since Todd Zeile in 1996.

In total, Devers slashed .252/.372/.479 in 2025 with 35 home runs in 2025, ranking third in MLB in walks (112), fifth in strikeouts (192), ninth in RBI (109), and ninth in on-base percentage. With the Red Sox, he slashed .272/.401/.504 with 15 home runs over 73 games; with the Giants, he slashed .236/.347/.460 with 20 home runs over 90 games.

==== 2026 ====
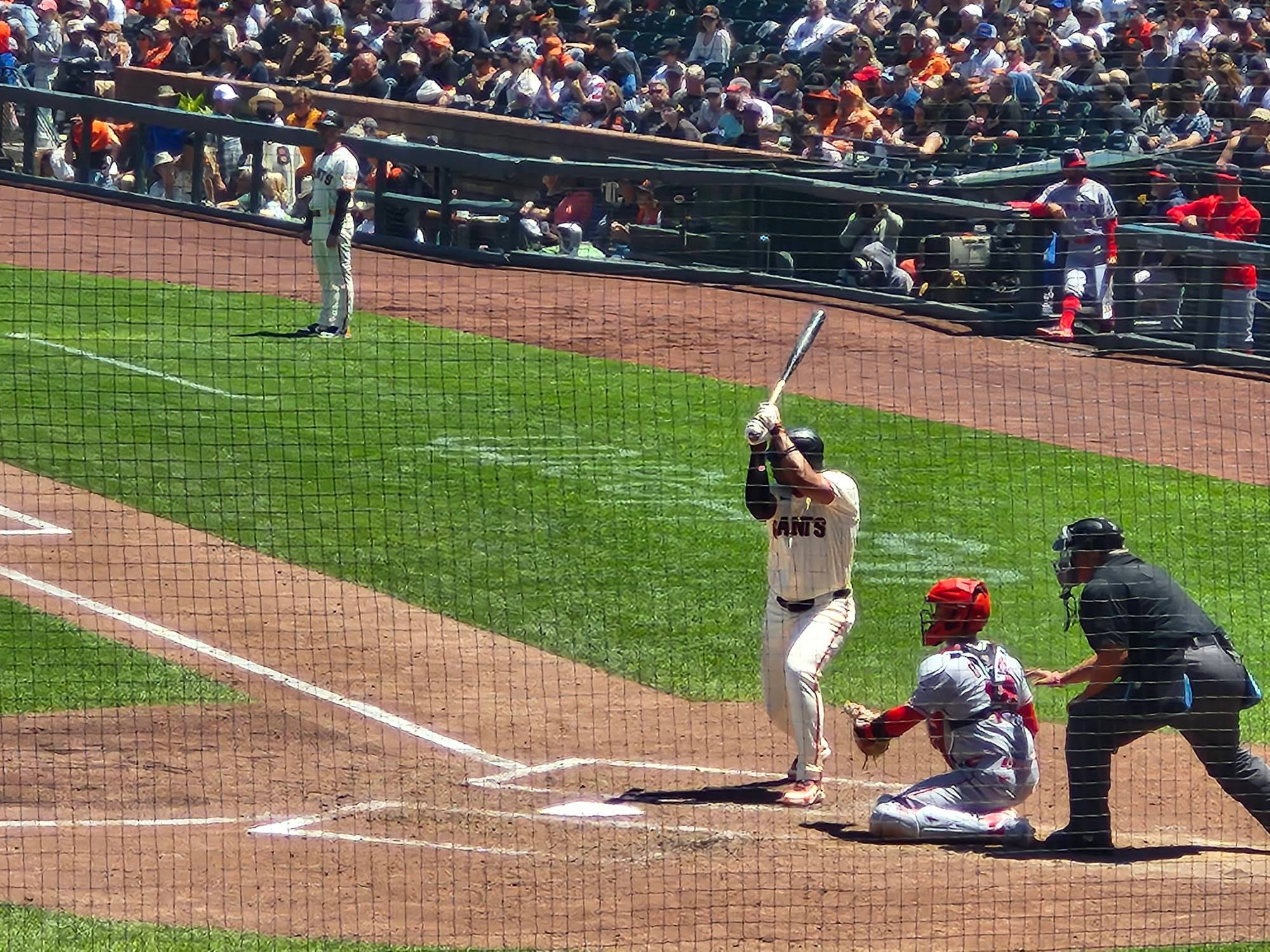
Devers hitting against the Los Angeles Angels on July 26

Devers struggled to open up 2026, slashing .207/.248/.289 with a 48 WRC+ in the first month of the season. On September 1, Devers hit his 30th home run of the season, becoming the second Giants to reach that mark since the departure of Barry Bonds and the fifth Giant since 1980 to hit 30 or more home runs in a single season. On September 8, Devers was named the National League Player of the Week after going 10-for-26 (.385) and slugging 1.154 with six homers, 13 RBI, seven walks and eight runs scored in that period.

On September 13, the Giants placed Devers on the 60-day IL with a core muscle injury after battling it for most of the season. He received left-side core surgery the following day, ending his season with a .258/.340/.525 slashline, 37 home runs, 98 RBI and a 142 OPS+ over 148 games.

== Personal life ==
Rafael was born on October 24, 1996, to Rafael Devers Sr. and Lucrecia Garcia in Sánchez Ramírez Province. He has two daughters.

Devers' cousin, José Devers, is a free agent who most recently played in the Atlanta Braves organization.

Devers was given the nickname “Carita”, which means “baby face”, because he was so happy and smiling as a child. He used the nickname for Players' Weekend in 2019.

== See also ==
- List of Boston Red Sox award winners
- List of largest sports contracts
- List of Major League Baseball annual doubles leaders
- List of Major League Baseball annual fielding errors leaders
- List of Major League Baseball career home run leaders
- List of Major League Baseball players from the Dominican Republic
- List of Major League Baseball single-game hits leaders
