= Nathan Eovaldi =

American baseball player (born 1990)

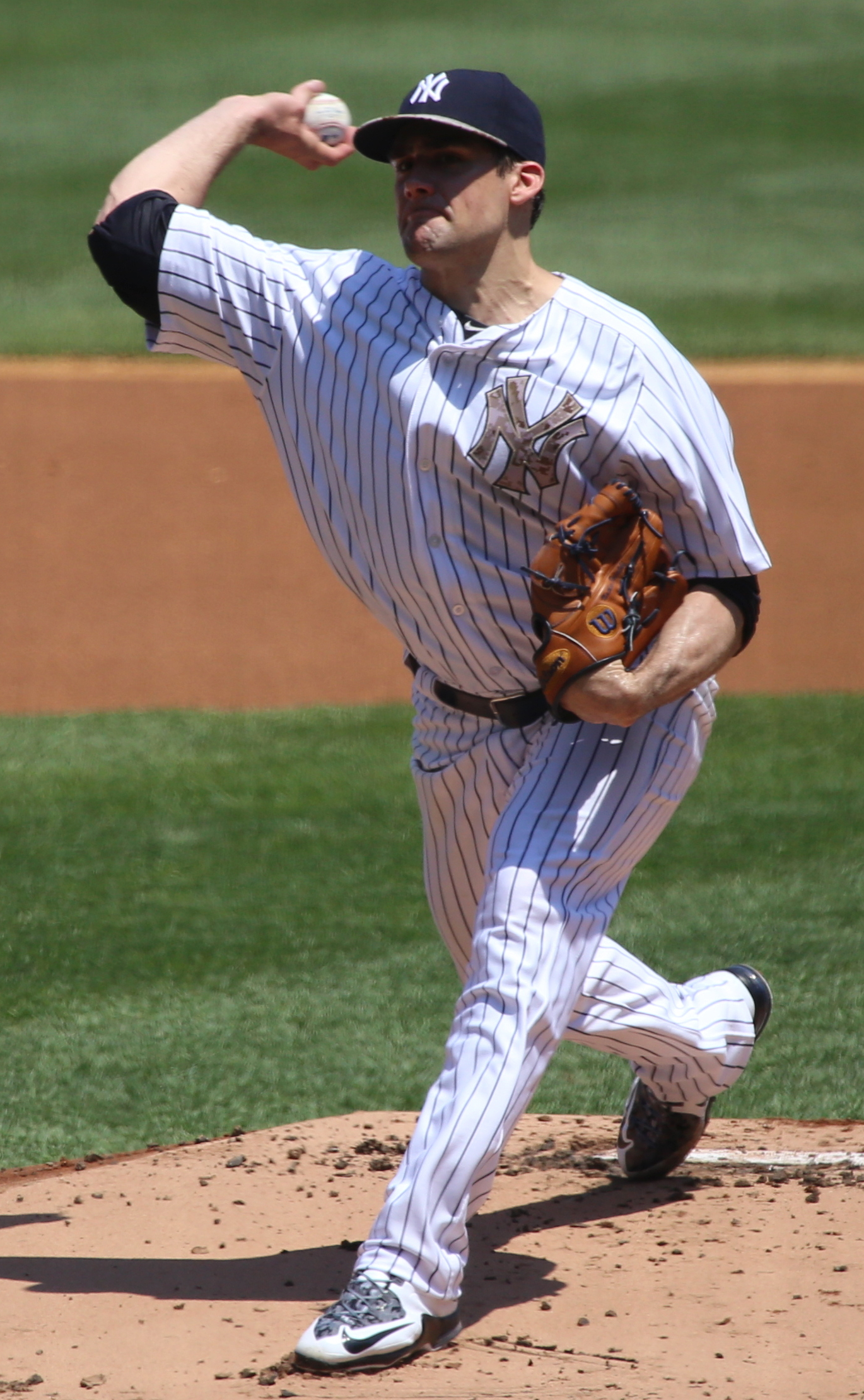
- Eovaldi with the New York Yankees in 2015

Texas Rangers – No. 17
- Pitcher
- Born: February 13, 1990 (age 36); Houston, Texas, U.S.
- Bats: Right Throws: Right

MLB debut
- August 6, 2011, for the Los Angeles Dodgers

MLB statistics (through 2026 season)
- Win–loss record: 113–94
- Earned run average: 3.92
- Strikeouts: 1,631
- Stats at Baseball Reference

Teams
- Los Angeles Dodgers (2011–2012); Miami Marlins (2012–2014); New York Yankees (2015–2016); Tampa Bay Rays (2018); Boston Red Sox (2018–2022); Texas Rangers (2023–present)

Career highlights and awards
- 2× All-Star (2021, 2023); 2× World Series champion (2018, 2023)

Nathan Edward Eovaldi (/ɛˈvældi/ ev-AL-dee; born February 13, 1990) is an American professional baseball pitcher for the Texas Rangers of Major League Baseball (MLB). He has previously played in MLB for the Los Angeles Dodgers, Miami Marlins, New York Yankees, Tampa Bay Rays, and Boston Red Sox.

Eovaldi made his MLB debut in 2011. He was a World Series champion with the Red Sox in 2018 and the Rangers in 2023 and has been selected as an All-Star in 2021 and 2023.

== Early life ==
Nathan Edward Eovaldi was born on February 13, 1990, in Alvin, Texas. Eovaldi attended Alvin High School in Alvin, Texas, where he played for the school's baseball team. Eovaldi had Tommy John surgery to repair the ulnar collateral ligament in his right elbow during his junior year of high school. In 2008, Eovaldi's senior year, he was an honorable mention on Texas' All-State team. He committed to attend Texas A&M University on a college baseball scholarship.

== Professional career ==
=== Draft and minor leagues ===
The Los Angeles Dodgers selected Eovaldi in the 11th round of the 2008 MLB draft. His draft stock had fallen because of his first Tommy John surgery. Eovaldi signed with the Dodgers, receiving a $250,000 signing bonus, forgoing his commitment to Texas A&M. He made his way through the Dodgers' farm system, pitching for the Gulf Coast Dodgers of the Rookie-level Gulf Coast League in 2008 and the Great Lakes Loons of the Single–A Midwest League in 2009.

In 2010, with the Inland Empire 66ers of San Bernardino of the High–A California League, Eovaldi was selected to the mid-season California League all-star team. Eovaldi was promoted to the Chattanooga Lookouts of the Double–A Southern League in 2011 and was selected to the mid-season all-star game. He had a 6–5 win–loss record with a 2.62 earned run average (ERA) for the Lookouts, where he started 19 games. Eovaldi was also selected to the post-season All-Star team.

=== Los Angeles Dodgers (2011–2012) ===
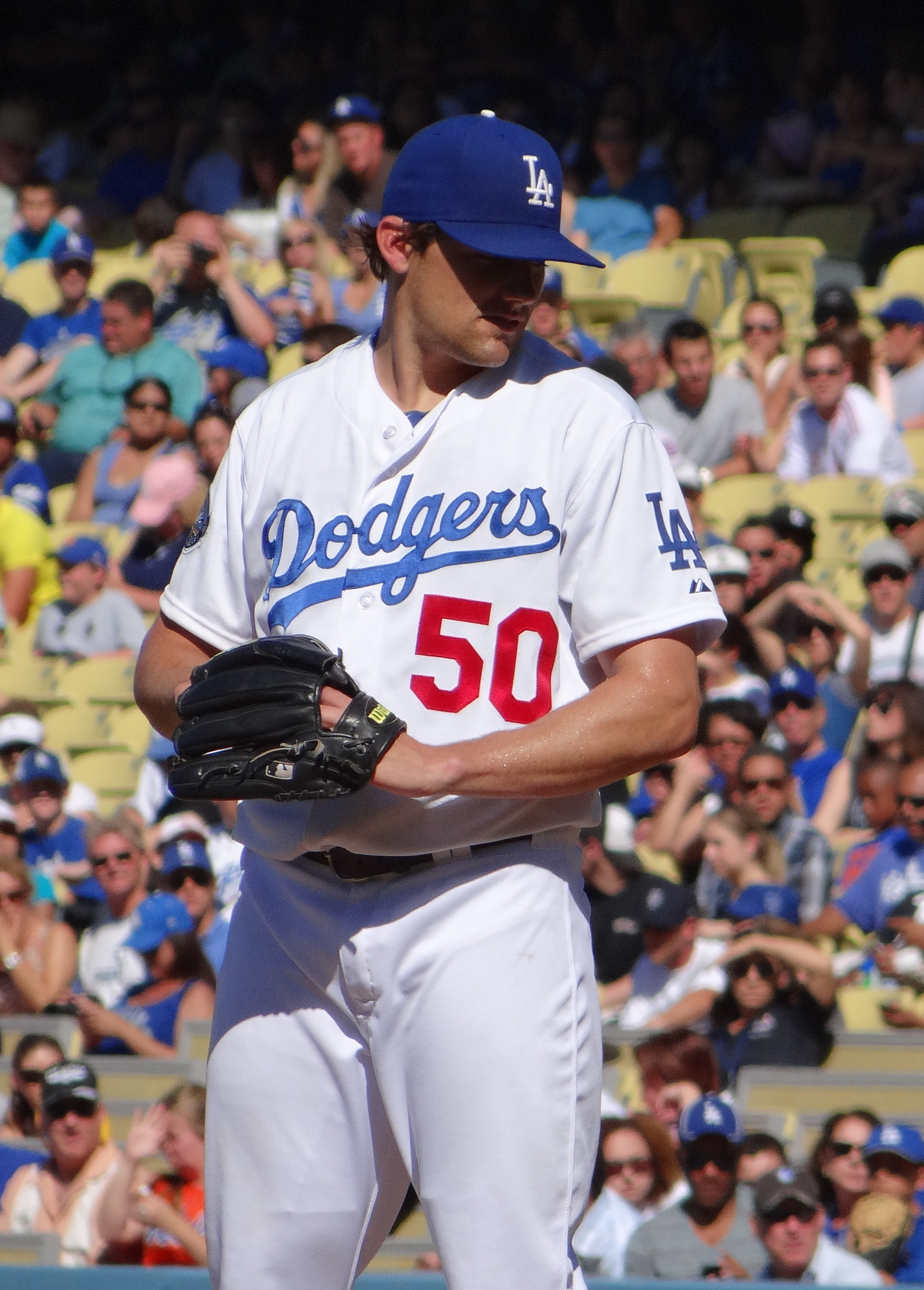
Eovaldi pitching for the Los Angeles Dodgers in 2012

Eovaldi was called up to the majors for the first time on August 6, 2011, and was the starting pitcher that night against the Arizona Diamondbacks. In the game, he picked up the win, while pitching five innings, allowing only two runs while striking out seven. He also hit a single in his first major league at bat and scored a run. His seven strikeouts were tied for fourth in Dodgers' history for a major league debut and he was only the fourth Dodger pitcher to score a run in his debut since 1960. Eovaldi became the first Dodger starter since Danny McDevitt in the 1957 season to start his career with four games of five innings or more while allowing two runs or fewer. He made 6 starts for the Dodgers and was then moved to the bullpen in order to keep his innings down for the season. He pitched in four games out of the bullpen late in the season. His 2011 totals included a 1–2 record and 3.63 ERA.

After beginning the 2012 season with Chattanooga, Eovaldi made his first appearance of the season for the Dodgers on May 29 when he started against the Milwaukee Brewers. He had four strikeouts, allowed 4 hits and 2 runs through 7 innings in a 1–2 loss. In 10 starts with the Dodgers, he had a 1–6 record with a 4.15 ERA.

=== Miami Marlins (2012–2014) ===
On July 25, 2012, Eovaldi was traded, along with minor league pitcher Scott McGough, to the Miami Marlins for Hanley Ramírez and Randy Choate. In his first game with the Marlins, he got the win vs the San Diego Padres on July 28. He started 12 games for the Marlins in 2012, with a 3–7 record and 4.43 ERA. He finished the season with a 4–13 record in 22 games with a 4.30 ERA, a 1.51 walks plus hits per inning pitched (WHIP) ratio, 47 walks, and 78 strikeouts in 119 1/3 innings pitched.

In 2013, Eovaldi had a 4–6 record with a 3.39 ERA and 78 strikeouts in 18 starts.

In 2014, Eovaldi had a 6–14 record with a 4.37 ERA. He allowed 223 hits, the most in the National League. He set new career highs with 33 games started and 199 2/3 innings pitched.

=== New York Yankees (2015–2016) ===
On December 19, 2014, the Marlins traded Eovaldi, Garrett Jones, and Domingo Germán to the New York Yankees for Martín Prado and David Phelps.

Eovaldi made his first start for the Yankees on April 10, 2015, against the Boston Red Sox, where he pitched 5 1/3 innings, allowing two runs on eight hits. He was credited with a no decision as the Yankees lost to the Red Sox, 6–5 in 19 innings. Eovaldi developed a split-finger fastball, which led to improved results. From June 20 through August 24, Eovaldi pitched to an 8–0 record with a 2.93 ERA. In September, Eovaldi experienced elbow inflammation, ending his regular season. For the 2015 Yankees, Eovaldi went 14–3 with a 4.20 ERA, pitching 154 1/3 innings in 27 starts. Eovaldi was prepared to pitch in the ALDS, but the Yankees were eliminated in the Wild Card Game.

On August 16, 2016, it was announced that Eovaldi would miss the remainder of the 2016 season due to a torn flexor tendon and partially-torn ulnar collateral ligament in his pitching (right) elbow. Several days later, the Yankees announced that Eovaldi had undergone his second Tommy John surgery. With the 2016 Yankees, Eovaldi made 24 appearances (21 starts), registering a 9–8 record with 4.76 ERA in 124 2/3 innings pitched. He was expected to miss the 2017 season, after which he would have become eligible for free agency. On November 23, the Yankees released Eovaldi.

=== Tampa Bay Rays (2018) ===
On February 14, 2017, Eovaldi signed a one-year, $2 million contract with the Tampa Bay Rays; the contract included a $2 million club option for the 2018 season. Eovaldi missed the entire 2017 season due to recovery from his prior elbow surgery. The Rays exercised the option going into the 2018 season.

On March 28, 2018, it was revealed that Eovaldi was diagnosed with "loose bodies" in his elbow, and was ruled out indefinitely. On May 30, almost a year and a half since his last start, Eovaldi pitched against the Oakland Athletics, throwing six no-hit innings before being taken out due to pitch count considerations. With the 2018 Rays, Eovaldi made 10 appearances (all starts) with a 4.26 ERA and 3–4 record, while recording 53 strikeouts and eight walks in 57 innings pitched.

=== Boston Red Sox (2018–2022) ===
==== 2018 ====
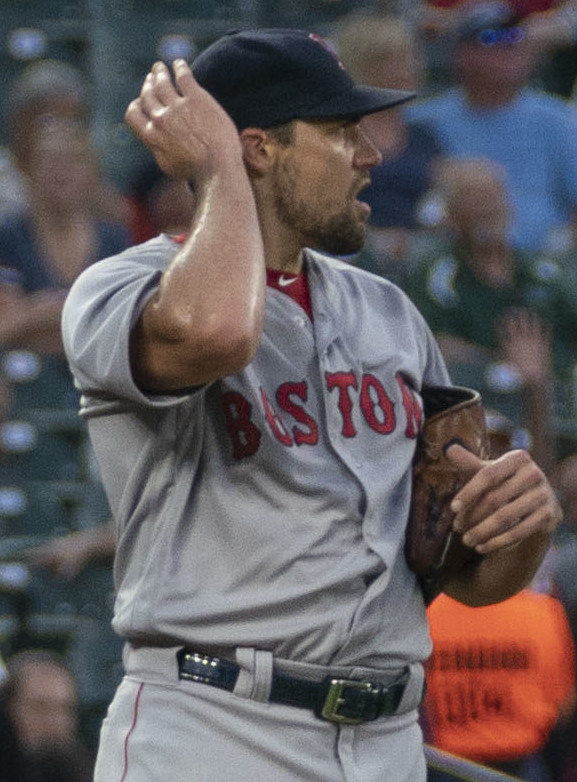
Eovaldi with Boston Red Sox in 2018

On July 25, 2018, the Rays traded Eovaldi to the Boston Red Sox in exchange for Jalen Beeks. Eovaldi made his Red Sox debut on July 29, going seven innings without giving up a run, as the Red Sox defeated the Minnesota Twins 3–0. With the 2018 Red Sox, Eovaldi made 12 appearances (11 starts) with a 3.33 ERA and 3–3 record, striking out 48 in 54 innings.

In the 2018 playoffs, Eovaldi pitched seven innings in Game 3 of the Division Series against the New York Yankees, which the Red Sox won 16–1, giving the Yankees their most lopsided loss in postseason history. In Game 3 of the League Championship Series against the Houston Astros, Eovaldi pitched six innings, allowing just two runs, as the Red Sox won 8–2. Eovaldi also pitched 1 1/3 innings of relief in Game 5 as Boston clinched the series win.

In the 2018 World Series against the Los Angeles Dodgers, Eovaldi pitched shutout 8th innings in Games 1 and 2. Although he was originally slated to start Game 4, Eovaldi ended up the final reliever in the 18-inning marathon Game 3, the longest game in World Series history. Eovaldi threw 97 pitches over six innings of relief before giving up a walk-off home run to Max Muncy, which made him the losing pitcher. Eovaldi allowed three hits and one earned run, while throwing 36 more pitches than starter Rick Porcello. Eovaldi's 97 pitches set the record for the most in a World Series game by a reliever, and he became the first reliever to throw 6+ innings in a World Series game since Rick Rhoden did so in 1977. In the 13th inning, Boston had taken the lead but an error by Ian Kinsler allowed Los Angeles to tie the score, for which Kinsler later apologized to Eovaldi. Eovaldi received a standing ovation in Boston's clubhouse after the game. The Red Sox went on to win the next two games, winning the World Series in five games. After the World Series, Eovaldi filed for free agency. On December 6, 2018, Eovaldi signed a four-year, $68 million contract to return to the Red Sox.

==== 2019 ====
Eovaldi started the 2019 season with a 6.00 ERA in four starts, all no decisions, before being placed on the injured list on April 20 due to a "loose body" (typically bone fragments) in his pitching (right) elbow. The Red Sox subsequently announced that Eovaldi would have surgery on April 23, and expected him to be out from four to six weeks. On June 25, Eovaldi was moved to the 60-day injured list. In early July, it was reported that the Red Sox would use Eovaldi in a closer role upon his return. He was sent on a rehabilitation assignment with the Triple-A Pawtucket Red Sox on July 18, and was activated two days later. Eovaldi made four relief appearances with Boston in late July, allowing five earned runs in 3 2/3 innings pitched. The Red Sox subsequently listed Brandon Workman as the closer on the team's depth chart. In mid-August, it was announced that Eovaldi would return to being a starter for the remainder of the season. Overall for the 2019 season, Eovaldi made 23 appearances (12 starts), recording a 5.99 ERA and 2–1 record with 70 strikeouts in 67 2/3 innings.

==== 2020 ====
For the 2020 season, Eovaldi was named Boston's Opening Day starter (delayed into July due to the COVID-19 pandemic) by manager Ron Roenicke. Eovaldi got the win in that game, pitching six innings while allowing five hits and one run, while striking out four batters, as the Red Sox defeated the Baltimore Orioles, 13–2. On August 29, Eovaldi was placed on the 10-day injured list, retroactive to August 26, due to a right calf strain; he returned to the active roster on September 12. Overall with the 2020 Red Sox, Eovaldi appeared in nine games (all starts), compiling a 4–2 record with 3.72 ERA and 52 strikeouts in 48 1/3 innings pitched.

==== 2021 ====
Eovaldi was Boston's Opening Day starter for the second year in a row, taking the loss as the Red Sox fell to the Orioles, 3–0. On July 4, he was named to the American League roster for the MLB All-Star Game. He finished the 2021 season with an 11–9 record, a 3.75 ERA and 195 strikeouts in 182 1/3 innings. He gave up the fewest walks per nine innings of any major league pitcher, at 1.73. His 54 doubles allowed also led the major leagues.

Eovaldi was the winning pitcher in the AL Wild Card Game, striking out eight batters and giving up four hits and one run in 5 1/3 innings over the Yankees. He made one start in the Division Series, a no decision against Tampa Bay, and three appearances (two starts) in the League Championship Series, going 1–2 against Houston as the Red Sox were defeated in six games. Eovaldi finished fourth in American League Cy Young Award voting after the season.

==== 2022 ====
Eovaldi was Boston's Opening Day starter for the third year in a row, becoming the 10th Red Sox pitcher to do so. Facing Gerrit Cole and the Yankees, he went five innings and allowed three runs on five hits, ending with a no decision after Boston lost in extra innings, 6–5. On May 17, he became the third MLB pitcher (after Chase Anderson and Michael Blazek) to ever allow five home runs in one inning, doing so against the Houston Astros; in total, he allowed eight hits and six earned runs in 1 2/3 innings in the eventual 13–4 loss. On May 28, Eovaldi threw his first major-league complete game in a 5–3 win against the Baltimore Orioles—he allowed seven hits, two earned runs, struck out six batters, and only issued one walk while throwing 108 pitches. On June 12, he was placed on the injured list with lower-back inflammation. He was reactivated by the team on July 15. Eovaldi returned to the injured list on August 23, due to right shoulder inflammation; he rejoined the team on September 29. In 20 starts with Boston during 2022, Eovaldi compiled a 6–3 record with 3.87 ERA while striking out 103 batters in 109 1/3 innings.

In early November 2022, Eovaldi elected to become a free agent.

=== Texas Rangers (2023–present) ===
==== 2023 ====
On December 27, 2022, Eovaldi signed a two-year contract, with a third year vesting player option, with the Texas Rangers worth $34 million guaranteed. In 25 starts for Texas in 2023, he compiled a 12–5 record and 3.63 ERA with 132 strikeouts across 144 innings pitched.

Eovaldi started Games 1 and 5 of the 2023 World Series, earning the win in the decisive game. The Rangers would go on to win game 5 and the World Series for the first time in franchise history. Eovaldi was the ace of the Rangers starting pitching rotation during the 2023 postseason, winning 5 of his 6 starts with a no decision in game 1 of the World Series. This tied an MLB record for the most wins by a pitcher in a single postseason; the only other pitchers to do it are Randy Johnson in 2001, Francisco Rodríguez in 2002, and Stephen Strasburg in 2019.

==== 2024 ====
Eovaldi made 29 starts for the Rangers in 2024, registering a 12–8 record and 3.80 ERA with 166 strikeouts across 170 2/3 innings pitched. On November 4, 2024, Eovaldi declined his player option for the 2025 season and became a free agent. On December 12, Eovaldi re-signed with Texas on a three-year $75 million contract.

==== 2025 ====
On April 1, Eovaldi tossed a 1–0 shutout over the Cincinnati Reds by throwing the first Maddux shutout of 2025 (SHO on fewer than 100 pitches) by allowing four hits and striking out eight batters. This is the Rangers’ first Maddux since Colby Lewis on September 11, 2015, against Oakland Athletics at Globe Life Park.

On June 1, Eovaldi was placed on the 15-day injured list due to right triceps tightness. He was activated off of the injured list on June 27. On July 30, Evolaldi recorded his 100th career win in a 6–3 victory over the Los Angeles Angels by allowing six hits, one run, walk two batters, and striking out four batters. Eovaldi was named as American League Pitcher of the Month for July after posting a 5–0 record, 0.59 ERA, allowing 21 hits and two earned runs, striking out 30 batters, and walked eight in 30 2/3 innings. It was the second Pitcher of the Month award he earned in his career. On August 26, Eovaldi was diagnosed with a rotator cuff strain, which led to the Rangers' decision to shut him down for the remainder of the season. Eovaldi finished his 2025 season going 11–3 with a league leading 1.73 ERA and 129 strikeouts. On October 9, he underwent surgery for a sports hernia.

== Pitching style ==
As a starting pitcher, Eovaldi is associated primarily with his electric four-seam fastball, which he regularly throws at 96-97 mph, occasionally topping out at 101 mph. Although a pitcher with his high-velocity fastball would traditionally be labeled as a power pitcher, Eovaldi has not, for most of his career, accumulated the high strikeout totals associated with fellow hard-throwing right-handers like Jacob deGrom and Justin Verlander. This result is explained by Eovaldi's regular use of his wide secondary arsenal to complement his fastball. Eovaldi throws a slider in the mid to high 80s, a cut fastball in the low 90s, a curveball in the high 70s, and a split-finger fastball in the high 80s, giving him a total of five distinct pitches. In 2021, he was the only pitcher to throw five different pitches at a rate of 10% or higher. Rather than exclusively trying to overwhelm his hitters with a combination of hard fastballs in the strike zone and sliders thrown out of the zone, Eovaldi throws all five of his pitches within the strike zone in an effort to generate weak swings that result in ground balls or popups. The amount of weak bat-to-ball contact that Eovaldi generates is due to the difficulty of predicting which of his five distinct pitches will be thrown at a given time, leading even the most accomplished hitters to guess incorrectly and swing at a slow curveball when expecting a splitter, for example.

== Personal life ==
Eovaldi and his wife, Rebekah, have one son and one daughter and reside in Houston.

Awards
Preceded by Gerrit Cole	American League Pitcher of the Month; May 2023	Succeeded by James Paxton
Preceded by Hunter Brown	American League Pitcher of the Month; July 2025	Succeeded by Trevor Rogers
