= 2021 American League Championship Series =

52nd edition of Major League Baseball's American League Championship Series

Team (Wins)	Managers	Season
Houston Astros (4)	Dusty Baker	95–67 (.586), GA: 5
Boston Red Sox (2)	Alex Cora	92–70 (.568), GB: 8
- Dates: October 15–22
- MVP: Yordan Alvarez (Houston)
- Umpires: David Rackley, Bill Miller (crew chief), Laz Diaz, Dan Iassogna, Jim Wolf, Alan Porter, Rob Drake

Broadcast
- Television: Fox (Games 1–2); FS1 (Games 2–6)
- TV announcers: Joe Buck, John Smoltz, Ken Rosenthal, and Tom Verducci
- Radio: ESPN
- Radio announcers: Dan Shulman and Eduardo Pérez
- ALDS: Boston Red Sox over Tampa Bay Rays (3–1); Houston Astros over Chicago White Sox (3–1)

The 2021 American League Championship Series was the best-of-seven series between the Boston Red Sox and the Houston Astros to decide the American League pennant winner. The Astros won the series, four games to two, to advance to the 2021 World Series.

The series was played in a 2–3–2 format, with the Astros hosting the first two and game 6 (they would also have hosted game 7 if there was one) games as the higher seeded team. Fox and FS1 televised all games in the United States.

The Astros would go on to lose to the Atlanta Braves in the World Series in six games.

== Background ==
The Boston Red Sox qualified for the postseason as the first wild card team in the American League. They defeated the New York Yankees in the Wild Card Game, then defeated the Tampa Bay Rays in four games in the Division Series. This was Boston's 12th appearance in the American League Championship Series (ALCS), having accrued a 6–5 record in prior appearances.

The Houston Astros qualified for the postseason as the American League West division leaders, having won the division for the fourth time in five seasons. In the American League Division Series, they defeated the Chicago White Sox in four games. This was the fifth consecutive ALCS appearance for the Astros, which was the first time a team had accomplished this feat since the 1991–1999 Atlanta Braves and the first in the AL since the 1971–1975 Oakland Athletics. The Astros won two of their four prior ALCS appearances. When they competed in the National League (before 2013), they won one of four appearances in the National League Championship Series (NLCS).

This was the third playoff meeting between the Red Sox and Astros. The series was a rematch of the 2018 ALCS, which was won by Boston in five games. Red Sox manager Alex Cora was the Astros bench coach during their 2017 championship season. Cora, along with general manager Jeff Luhnow, manager A. J. Hinch, and veteran player Carlos Beltrán, were all suspended for a full season for their roles in the Houston Astros sign stealing scandal. After his year long suspension ended, Cora was re-hired as the Red Sox' manager on November 6, 2020. The only other postseason meeting between the Astros and Red Sox came during the 2017 American League Division Series, which was won by Houston in four games.

The Astros won the season series with the Red Sox, 5–2. The seven games between the two clubs were played over the course of ten days (May 31 through June 9) and the Astros outscored the Red Sox by 17 runs.

The Astros' ace starting pitcher Lance McCullers Jr. was left off the ALCS roster due to a forearm injury.

== Summary ==
Houston won the series, 4–2.

Game	Date	Score	Location	Time	Attendance
1	October 15	Boston Red Sox – 4, Houston Astros – 5	Minute Maid Park	4:07	40,534
2	October 16	Boston Red Sox – 9, Houston Astros – 5	Minute Maid Park	4:08	41,476
3	October 18	Houston Astros – 3, Boston Red Sox – 12	Fenway Park	3:16	37,603
4	October 19	Houston Astros – 9, Boston Red Sox – 2	Fenway Park	4:04	38,010
5	October 20	Houston Astros – 9, Boston Red Sox – 1	Fenway Park	3:32	37,599
6	October 22	Boston Red Sox – 0, Houston Astros – 5	Minute Maid Park	3:28	42,718

== Game summaries ==
=== Game 1 ===
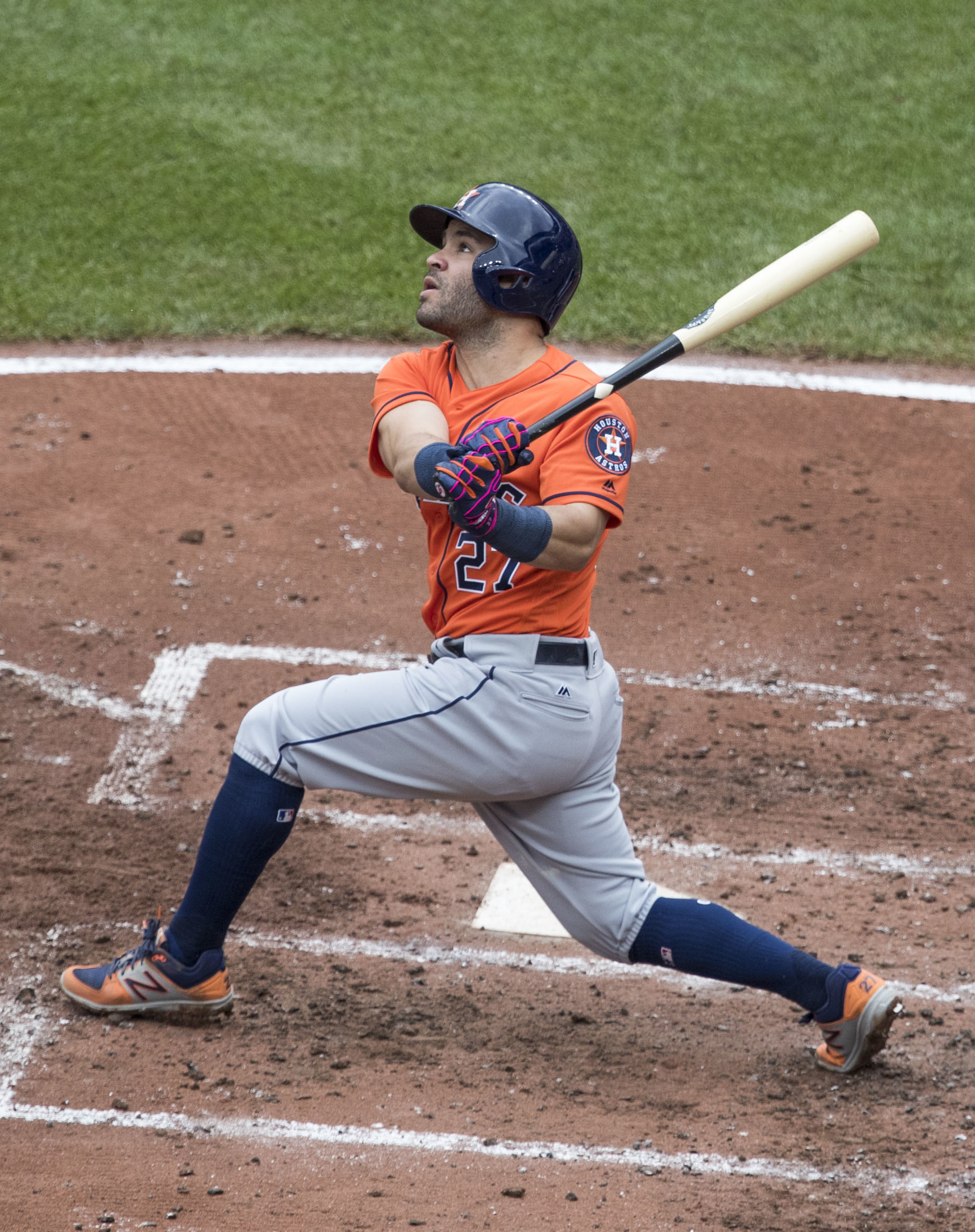
Jose Altuve had a home run and three RBIs in Game 1.

October 15, 2021 7:09 pm (CDT) at Minute Maid Park in Houston, Texas 73 °F (23 °C), roof closed
Team	1	2	3	4	5	6	7	8	9	R	H	E
Boston	0	0	3	0	0	0	0	0	1	4	10	0
Houston	1	0	0	0	0	2	1	1	X	5	11	1
WP: Ryne Stanek (1–0) LP: Hansel Robles (0–1) Sv: Ryan Pressly (1); Home runs: BOS: Kiké Hernández 2 (2); HOU: Jose Altuve (1), Carlos Correa (1); Attendance: 40,534; Boxscore

Framber Valdez of the Astros was matched up against Chris Sale of the Red Sox, but the game would soon turn into a bullpen affair. The Red Sox loaded the bases with two outs in the top of the first, but were unable to score. The Astros scored a run in the bottom of the first; Jose Altuve, who had drawn a leadoff walk, scored on a sacrifice fly by Yordan Alvarez. In the bottom of the second, Houston loaded the bases with one out but did not score. A leadoff home run by Kiké Hernández in the top of the third tied the game. A one-out walk by Xander Bogaerts, followed by a single and an error, gave Boston a 2–1 lead, and Hunter Renfroe then doubled to make it a 3–1 game. With two out in the top of the third, Yimi García relieved Houston starter Framber Valdez. In the bottom of the frame, Sale left with two on and two out, relieved by Adam Ottavino. The game stayed this way for the next few innings as both teams would use seven relievers. A two-run homer by Altuve off of Tanner Houck with two out in the bottom of the sixth tied the game, 3–3. It was the 20th postseason homer of Altuve's career, tying him with Derek Jeter for third on the MLB all-time list while also marking him as the fastest hitter to 20 home runs in the postseason. Carlos Correa put Houston ahead, 4–3, with a solo home run in the bottom of the seventh off of Hansel Robles. After the Astros loaded the bases with none out in the bottom of the eighth off of Red Sox reliever Hirokazu Sawamura, an Altuve sacrifice fly gave Houston a 5–3 lead. Boston got a run back to start the ninth, as Hernández homered off of Houston closer Ryan Pressly. Pressly then retired the next three batters, giving Houston the win and a 1–0 lead in the series.

The teams combined to use 16 total pitchers in the game, eight each. Hernández went 4-for-5 with two home runs while falling a triple short of the cycle. It gave him 29 total bases in his four most recent postseason games, tying the mark for the most total bases in a four-game span in postseason history with Reggie Jackson.

=== Game 2 ===
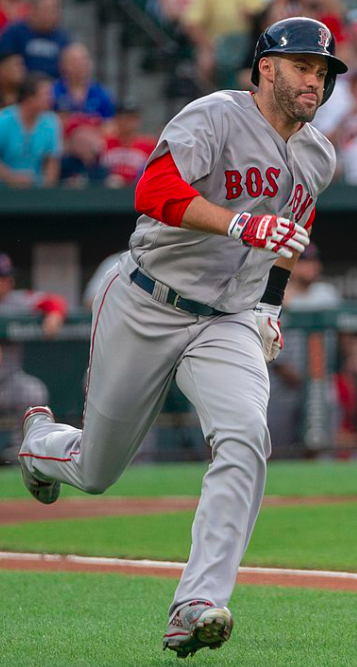
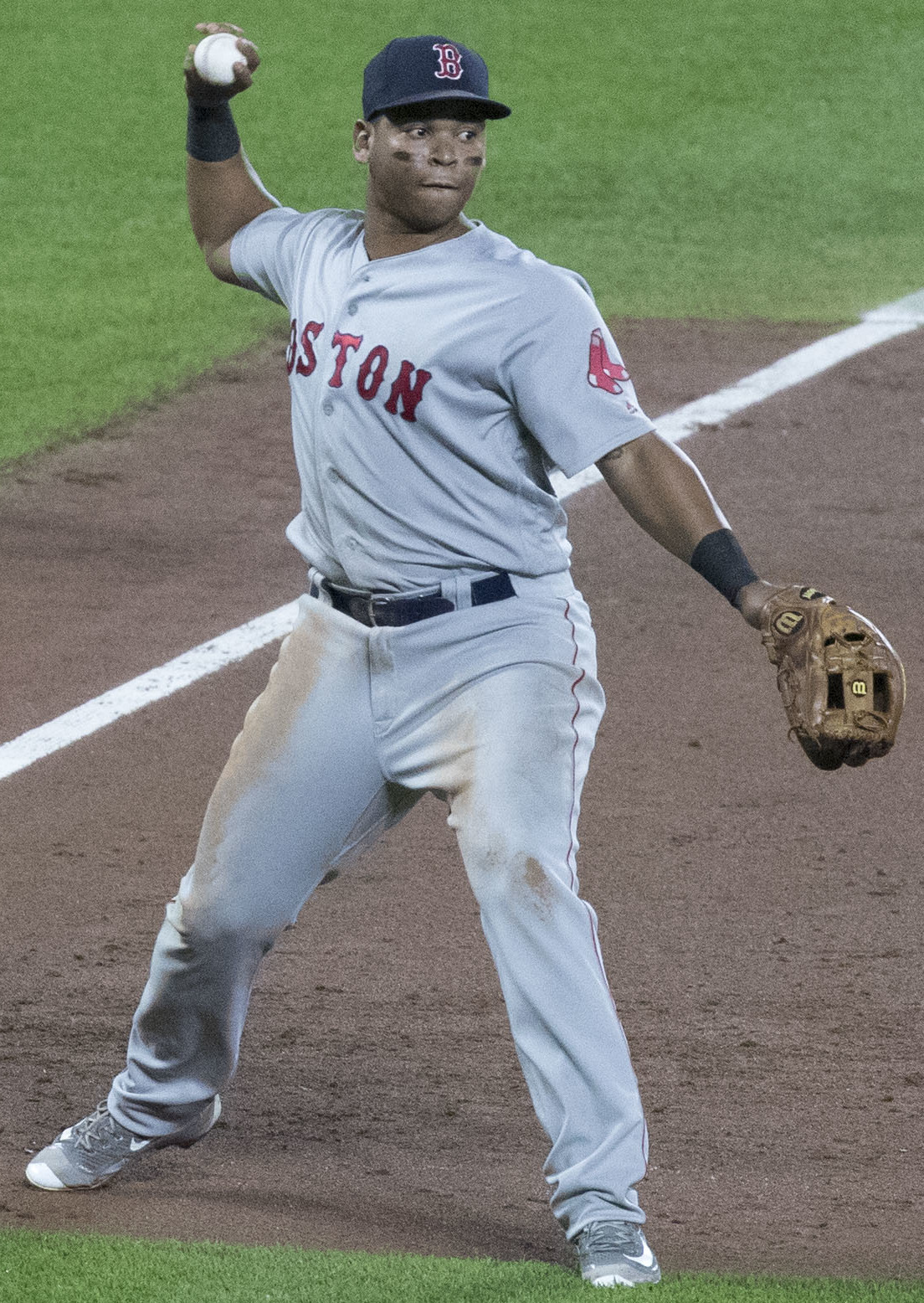
Boston had grand slams by J. D. Martinez (left) and Rafael Devers in Game 2.

October 16, 2021 3:21 pm (CDT) at Minute Maid Park in Houston, Texas 73 °F (23 °C), roof closed
Team	1	2	3	4	5	6	7	8	9	R	H	E
Boston	4	4	0	1	0	0	0	0	0	9	11	0
Houston	0	0	0	3	0	0	0	0	2	5	8	0
WP: Nathan Eovaldi (1–0) LP: Luis García (0–1); Home runs: BOS: J. D. Martinez (1), Rafael Devers (1), Kiké Hernández (3); HOU: Yuli Gurriel (1), Jason Castro (1); Attendance: 41,476; Boxscore

Boston tied the series at one game each, with a 9–5 win in Game 2. Starting pitchers were Nathan Eovaldi for Boston, and Luis García for Houston. J. D. Martinez hit a grand slam in the top of the first to give Boston a 4–0 lead over the Astros. It was the first postseason grand slam in the first inning by a Red Sox player since J. D. Drew in 2007 ALCS Game 6. García left early in the top of the second due to knee discomfort. Rafael Devers hit a second grand slam in the top of the second, making the Red Sox the first team in postseason history to hit two grand slams in one game. A fourth-inning homer by Kiké Hernández, his third of the series, made it 9–0. The Astros rallied with two outs in the bottom of the fourth for three runs, trimming Boston's lead to 9–3. Yuli Gurriel and Jason Castro each hit solo home runs in the bottom of the ninth, making it 9–5, the final score.

The teams combined to use 10 total pitchers in the game, five each. Hernández was 2-for-4 with a home run and a single, setting a new Major League record for the most total bases in a five-game playoff span, with 34; it also set a new Red Sox franchise record for the most total bases in any five-game span.

=== Game 3 ===
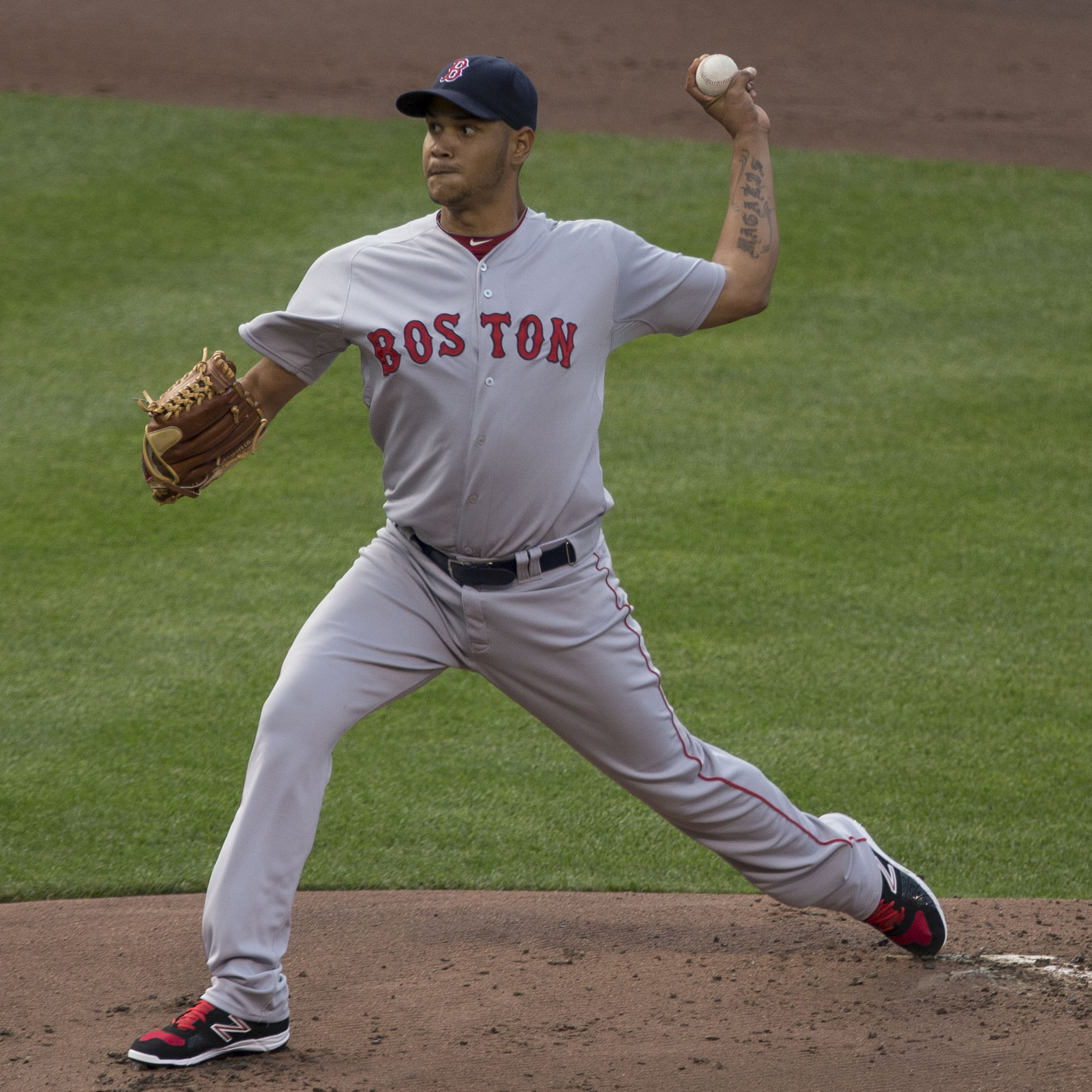
Eduardo Rodríguez earned the win in Game 3.

October 18, 2021 8:09 pm (EDT) at Fenway Park in Boston, Massachusetts 52 °F (11 °C), passing clouds
Team	1	2	3	4	5	6	7	8	9	R	H	E
Houston	0	0	0	3	0	0	0	0	0	3	5	2
Boston	0	6	3	0	0	2	0	1	X	12	11	0
WP: Eduardo Rodríguez (1–0) LP: José Urquidy (0–1); Home runs: HOU: Kyle Tucker (1); BOS: Kyle Schwarber (1), Christian Arroyo (1), J. D. Martinez (2), Rafael Devers (2); Attendance: 37,603; Boxscore

Boston won Game 3, 12–3, to take a 2–1 lead in the series. Eduardo Rodríguez started for Boston and José Urquidy started for Houston. The Red Sox sent 11 men to the plate in the bottom of the second, scoring six runs. Four of the runs came on a grand slam by Kyle Schwarber, the third by a Red Sox batter in two games. Urquidy left with two outs in the second, having allowed six runs (five earned) on five hits and two walks while striking out one batter. Boston added three runs in the bottom of the third, including a two-run homer by Christian Arroyo, extending the Red Sox' lead to 9–0. Astros right fielder Kyle Tucker hit a three-run homer with two out in the top of the fourth, making it a 9–3 game. Boston made it 11–3 in the bottom of the sixth via a two-run homer by J. D. Martinez. Hansel Robles relieved Rodríguez in the top of the seventh, Rodríguez having allowed three runs on five hits and no walks while striking out seven. Rafael Devers hit a solo home run in the bottom of the eighth, extending the lead to 12–3, the final score.

The Astros used six pitchers, while the Red Sox used four. Boston's three grand slams—two in Game 2 and one in Game 3—was the first time a major league team hit three slams in any postseason series.

=== Game 4 ===
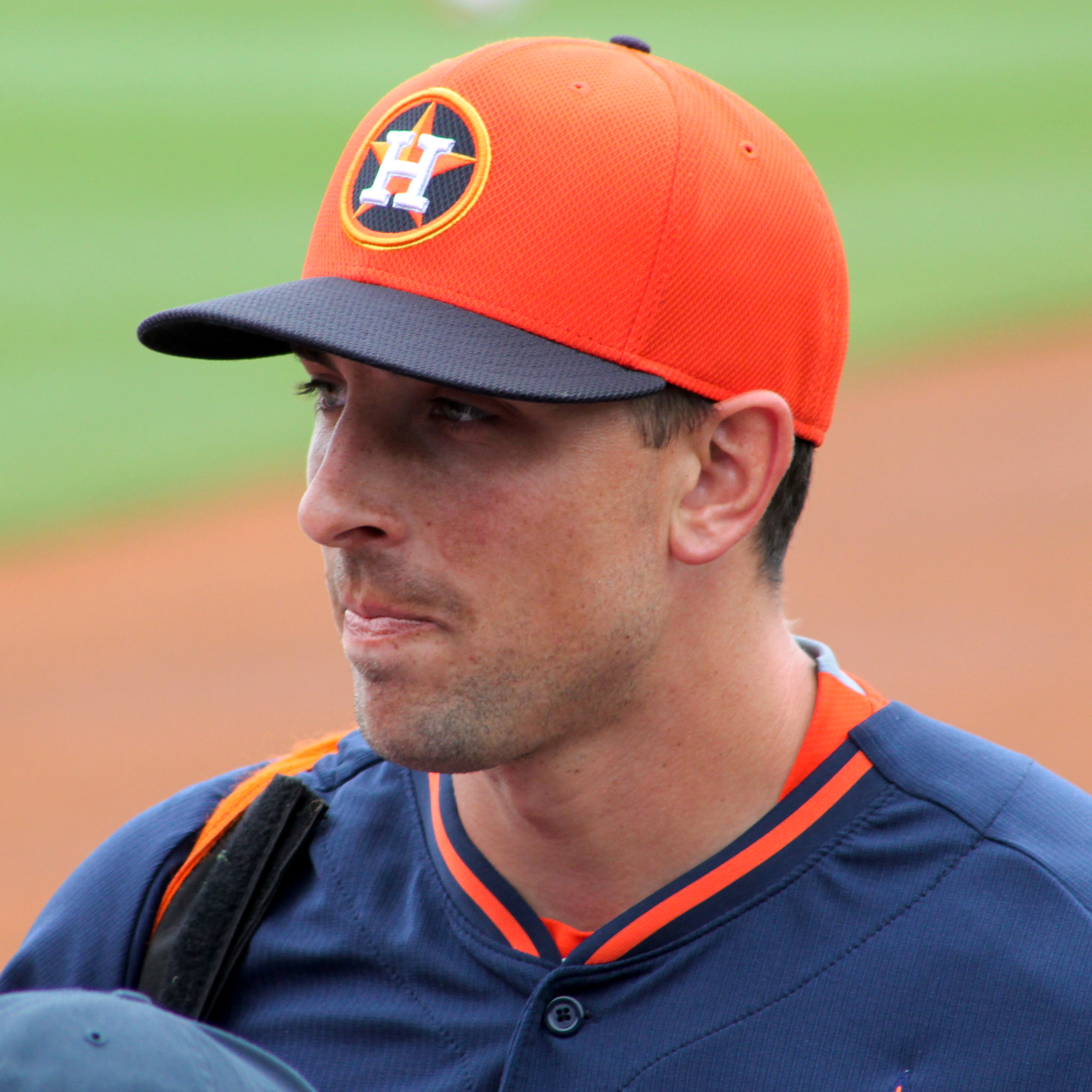
Jason Castro drove in the go-ahead run in Houston's seven-run ninth inning of Game 4.

October 19, 2021 8:08 pm (EDT) at Fenway Park in Boston, Massachusetts 59 °F (15 °C), partly cloudy
Team	1	2	3	4	5	6	7	8	9	R	H	E
Houston	1	0	0	0	0	0	0	1	7	9	12	1
Boston	2	0	0	0	0	0	0	0	0	2	5	2
WP: Kendall Graveman (1–0) LP: Nathan Eovaldi (1–1); Home runs: HOU: Alex Bregman (1), Jose Altuve (2); BOS: Xander Bogaerts (1); Attendance: 38,010; Boxscore

Nick Pivetta started for Boston and Zack Greinke started for Houston. The Astros took an early 1–0 lead via a solo home run by Alex Bregman with two outs in the top of the first. In the bottom of the first, Rafael Devers walked with two outs, then Xander Bogaerts homered to give the Red Sox a 2–1 lead. Greinke left with one out in the bottom of the second, having allowed two runs on one hit and three walks; he did not strike out a batter. Christian Arroyo hit a one-out triple in the bottom of the fourth, but the Red Sox were unable to score him. Bogaerts hit a one-out double in the bottom of the fifth and was also left stranded. Pivetta left after the fifth inning, having allowed one run on two hits and two walks; he struck out three. Jose Altuve tied the game, 2–2, with a home run off of Garrett Whitlock to lead off the eighth inning. Nate Eovaldi came in to pitch the top of the ninth, and Carlos Correa led off with a double over Hunter Renfroe in right field. With two outs and after a controversial non-strike three call by home plate umpire Laz Díaz, Jason Castro singled to drive in Correa and give the Astros a 3–2 lead. Houston was able to load the bases, and Boston brought in Martín Pérez. Michael Brantley hit his first pitch for a double that scored three runs, giving Houston a 6–2 lead. A single by Yordan Alvarez plated another run, making it 7–2. Correa, batting for the second time in the inning, hit a ball fielded by Pérez that was thrown away for an error, allowing another run to score, and a single by Kyle Tucker drove in the Astros' seventh and final run of the inning, which was the most scored in a postseason inning in Astros history. It was also the first time a team had scored seven runs in the 9th inning (or later) in a postseason game since 2007 and sixth time overall. Houston closer Ryan Pressly came in to pitch the bottom of the ninth; he allowed two singles, but prevented Boston from scoring as Houston evened the series, 2–2.

Altuve's home run was the 21st of his postseason career, which moved him to third on the all-time list and set the record for most career postseason home runs by an infielder, breaking the tie with Derek Jeter.

Earlier on the day of the game, an MD-87 jet carrying 18 Astros fans and three crew members crashed near Houston Executive Airport as they were departing for the game; there were no significant injuries reported.

=== Game 5 ===
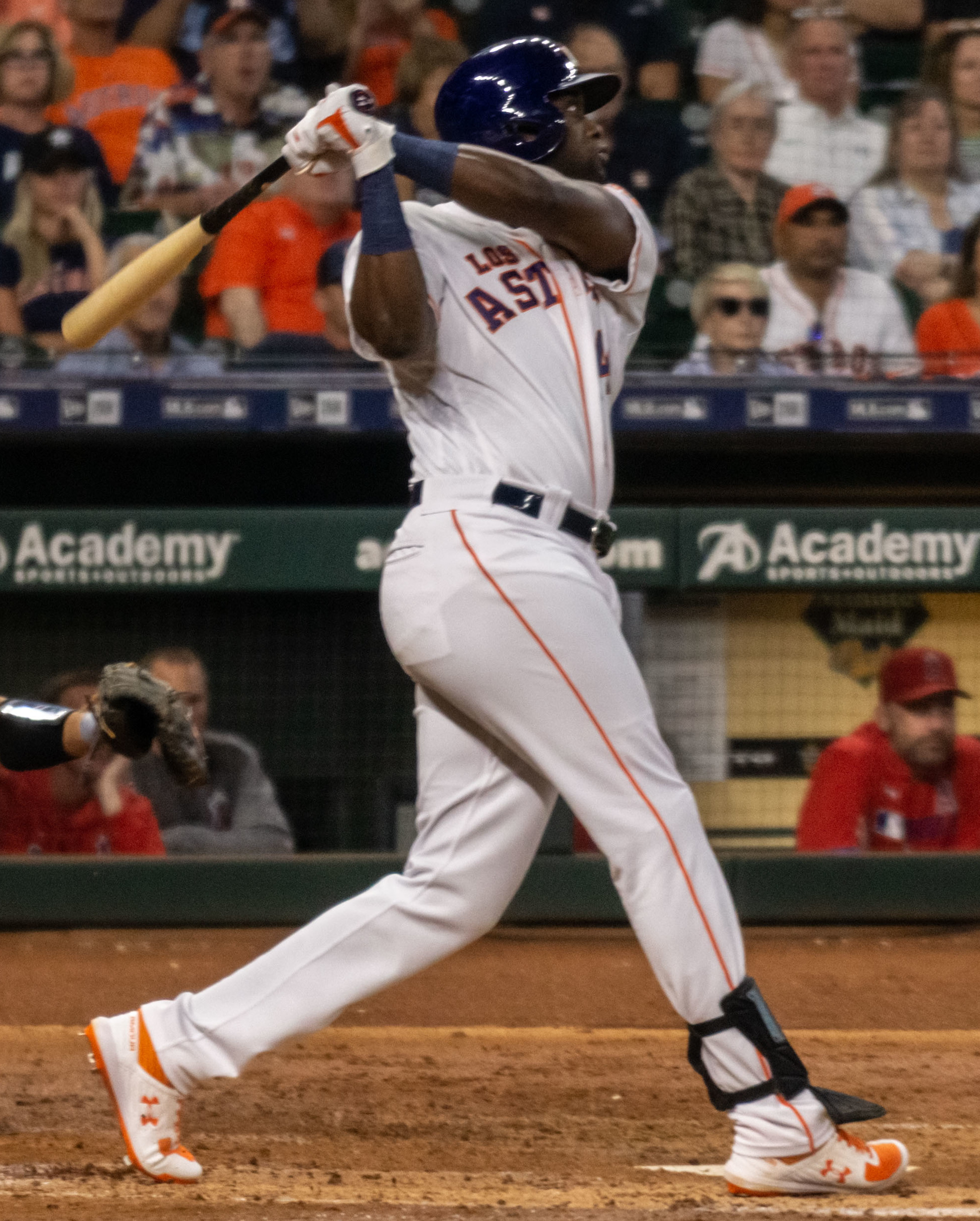
Yordan Alvarez had three hits, including a home run, and three RBIs in Game 5.

October 20, 2021 5:10 pm (EDT) at Fenway Park in Boston, Massachusetts 61 °F (16 °C), mostly cloudy
Team	1	2	3	4	5	6	7	8	9	R	H	E
Houston	0	1	0	0	0	5	1	0	2	9	11	0
Boston	0	0	0	0	0	0	1	0	0	1	3	2
WP: Framber Valdez (1–0) LP: Chris Sale (0–1); Home runs: HOU: Yordan Alvarez (1); BOS: Rafael Devers (3); Attendance: 37,599; Boxscore

Chris Sale started for the Red Sox and Framber Valdez started for the Astros. Houston took a 1–0 lead on a solo home run by Yordan Alvarez in the top of the second inning, to the opposite field over the Green Monster. Valdez did not allow a Boston baserunner until the fifth inning. The Astros scored five runs in the top of the sixth, chasing Sale with one out. Houston's runs came on four hits, a walk, and an error, giving the Astros a 6–0 lead. The teams traded runs in the seventh, making it 7–1. Boston's only run of the game was a solo homer by Rafael Devers. Houston added two more runs in the top of the ninth, for the 9–1 final. Both Alvarez and Yuli Gurriel had three hits and three RBIs. All of Alvarez' hits landed to the opposite field, marking the first occasion in Alvarez' career in which he collected at least three opposite-field hits. Sale took the loss, having pitched 5 1/3 innings while allowing four runs (two earned) on three hits and two walks while striking out seven batters. Valdez went eight innings and got the win, limiting Boston to one run on three hits and a walk while striking out five. He became the seventh visiting pitcher to go at least eight innings while allowing one run or fewer at Fenway Park in the postseason, and the first since Charles Nagy in the 1998 ALDS. The Astros took a 3–2 lead in the series, the third ALCS in a row to go at least six games.

=== Game 6 ===
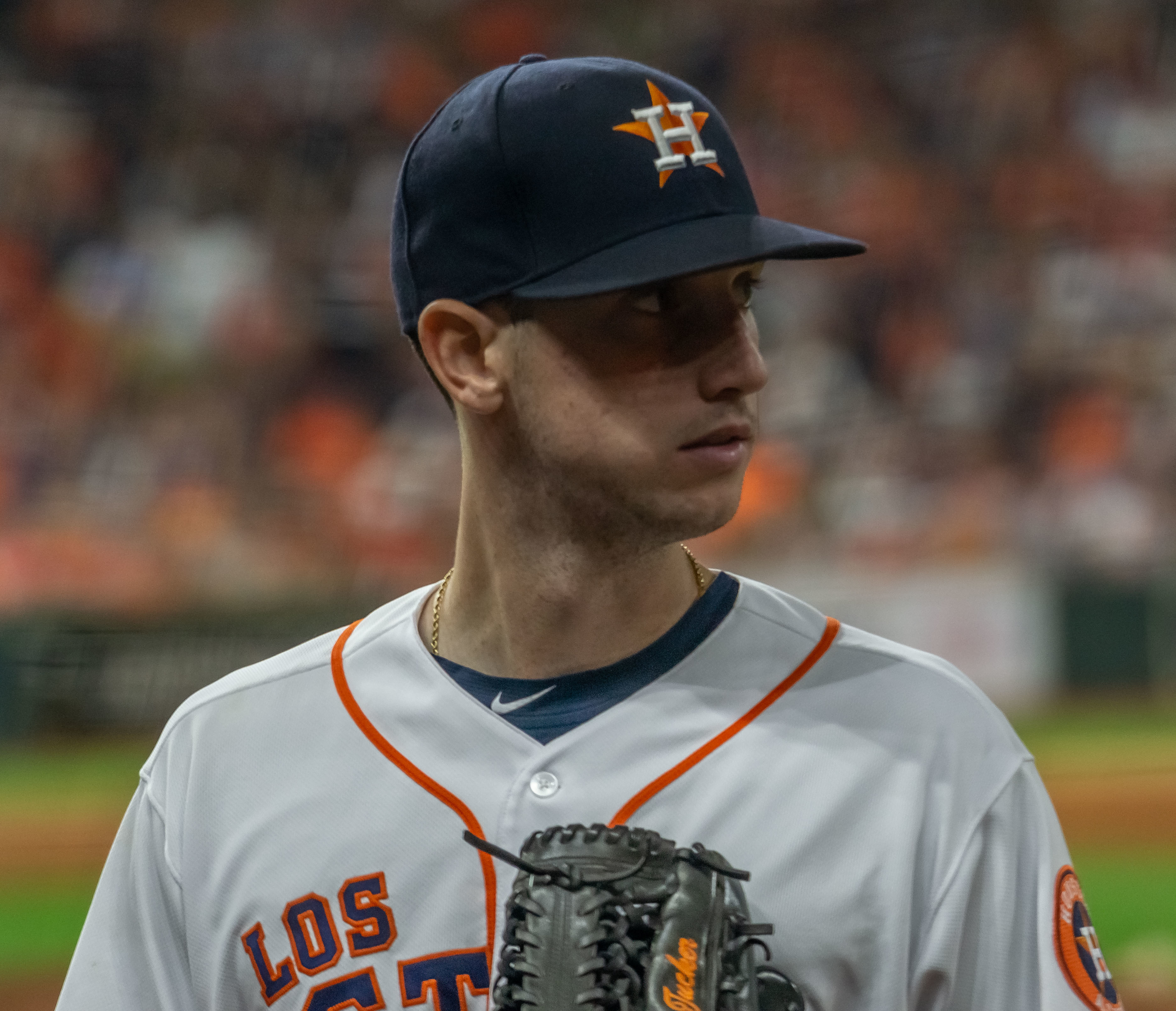
Kyle Tucker had a three-run home run in Game 6.

October 22, 2021 7:09 pm (CDT) at Minute Maid Park in Houston, Texas 73 °F (23 °C),roof closed
Team	1	2	3	4	5	6	7	8	9	R	H	E
Boston	0	0	0	0	0	0	0	0	0	0	2	0
Houston	1	0	0	0	0	1	0	3	X	5	10	0
WP: Luis García (1–1) LP: Nathan Eovaldi (1–2); Home runs: BOS: None; HOU: Kyle Tucker (1); Attendance: 42,718; Boxscore

Luis García started for Houston and Nathan Eovaldi for Boston, a rematch of Game 2. The Astros took a 1–0 lead in the bottom of the first; with two outs, Alex Bregman singled then was driven in on a double by Yordan Alvarez that hit off the glove of Red Sox center fielder Kiké Hernández. In the bottom of the fourth, Houston had runners on second and third with no outs, but Eovaldi struck out the next two batters, intentionally walked Yuli Gurriel, and then struck out Chas McCormick to end the threat. Eovaldi left with one out in the bottom of the fifth, having allowed one run on five hits while striking out four; he was relieved by Josh Taylor. García held the Red Sox hitless through five innings; he left in the top of the sixth after allowing a two-out triple to Hernández. His no-hit bid of 5 2/3 innings before allowing a hit was the second most by a rookie pitcher in postseason history. García was relieved by Phil Maton, who ended the threat by getting Rafael Devers to pop out. Alvarez opened the bottom of the sixth with a triple off of Taylor near the right-field line. After Carlos Correa was hit by a pitch from Tanner Houck, Kyle Tucker grounded into a double play, scoring Alvarez and giving Houston a 2–0 lead. In the top of the seventh, Boston had runners at first and third with one out; Kendall Graveman struck out Travis Shaw and catcher Martín Maldonado threw out Alex Verdugo, who had been running on the pitch, at second base to end the inning. Alvarez collected his fourth hit of the game in the bottom of the eighth, singling to give the Astros runners at first and second with one out. After Correa grounded out, Tucker homered off of Adam Ottavino, extending Houston's lead to 5–0. Astros closer Ryan Pressly entered to pitch the top of the ninth. He retired the side in order, as Houston advanced to the World Series.

With the win, 72-year-old Dusty Baker became the oldest manager to win an American League pennant, while being the second-oldest manager to reach the World Series after Jack McKeon in 2003. After the game, Alvarez was named the ALCS MVP, having batted 12-for-23 (.522) in the series. Seven of his hits came in the last two games; he out-hit the entire Red Sox team in those games, which was the first time in postseason history a player had done so in the final two games of a series. The Red Sox, having scored 27 runs in the first 28 innings of the Series, then scored only one run in the last 26 innings.

=== Composite line score ===
2021 ALCS (4–2): Houston Astros beat Boston Red Sox

Team	1	2	3	4	5	6	7	8	9	R	H	E
Boston Red Sox	6	10	6	1	0	2	1	1	1	28	42	4
Houston Astros	3	1	0	6	0	8	2	5	11	36	57	4
Total attendance: 237,940 Average attendance: 39,657

== See also ==
- 2021 National League Championship Series
