= 2018 American League Championship Series =

49th edition of Major League Baseball's American League Championship Series

Team (Wins)	Managers	Season
Boston Red Sox (4)	Alex Cora	108–54 (.667), GA: 8
Houston Astros (1)	A. J. Hinch	103–59 (.636), GA: 6
- Dates: October 13–18
- MVP: Jackie Bradley Jr. (Boston)
- Umpires: Vic Carapazza, Mark Carlson, Chris Guccione, James Hoye (Games 1–2), Bill Miller (Games 3–5), Mark Wegner, Joe West (crew chief)

Broadcast
- Television: TBS
- TV announcers: Brian Anderson, Ron Darling and Lauren Shehadi
- Radio: ESPN
- Radio announcers: Jon Sciambi and Jessica Mendoza
- ALDS: Boston Red Sox over New York Yankees (3–1); Houston Astros over Cleveland Indians (3–0)

The 2018 American League Championship Series was a best-of-seven series pitting the defending World Series champion Houston Astros against the Boston Red Sox, for the American League (AL) pennant and the right to play in the 2018 World Series. The series was played in a 2–3–2 format, with the first two and last two (had they been necessary) games played at the home ballpark of the team with the better regular season record, the Red Sox. The series was the 49th in league history, with TBS televising all games in the United States. The Red Sox defeated the Astros in five games.

For the second year in a row, Major League Baseball sold presenting sponsorships to all of its postseason series; as with the NLCS, this ALCS was sponsored by Google Assistant and was officially known as the American League Championship Series presented by Google Assistant.

The Red Sox would go on to defeat the Los Angeles Dodgers in the World Series in five games to win their ninth World Series championship.

== Background ==
The Astros won the American League West division with a record of 103–59, then swept the Cleveland Indians in the American League Division Series. This was the Astros' sixth League Championship Series and second in the American League, their prior AL appearance being a 2017 ALCS win over the New York Yankees in seven games. Houston also appeared in four NLCS, winning once and losing thrice, before joining the American League in 2013.

The Red Sox won the American League East division with a record of 108–54, then defeated the New York Yankees in the American League Division Series, 3–1. This was Boston's 11th ALCS. They had a prior record of 5–5 in those series, most recently winning in 2013 and most recently losing in 2008.

The 2018 ALCS was just the 12th postseason match-up to feature two teams with 100 wins, though the third since the 2017 World Series. The 211 combined regular season wins for both teams was the second-most of any postseason series ever, just behind the 1998 World Series. It was also the first ALCS to feature two 100-win teams since 1977, when the New York Yankees (100–62) defeated the Kansas City Royals (102–60).

Boston and Houston had met once before in the postseason, with the Astros winning the 2017 ALDS, 3–1; that year Alex Cora was Houston's bench coach before becoming manager of Boston for the upcoming season. Houston was 4–3 in their seven games against Boston during the 2018 regular season.

=== Team statistics ===
For the 2018 regular season.

Stat	Boston (MLB rank)	Houston (MLB rank)	Type
Batting average	.268 (1st)	.255 (7th)	Batting
OPS	.792 (1st)	.754 (7th)	Batting
Home runs	208 (9th)	205 (10th)	Batting
ERA	3.75 (8th)	3.11 (1st)	Pitching
Strikeouts	1,558 (4th)	1,687 (1st)	Pitching
BAA	.237 (8th)	.217 (1st)	Pitching

== Summary ==
Boston won the series, 4–1.

Game	Date	Score	Location	Time	Attendance
1	October 13	Houston Astros – 7, Boston Red Sox – 2	Fenway Park	4:03	38,007
2	October 14	Houston Astros – 5, Boston Red Sox – 7	Fenway Park	3:45	37,960
3	October 16	Boston Red Sox – 8, Houston Astros – 2	Minute Maid Park	3:52	43,102
4	October 17	Boston Red Sox – 8, Houston Astros – 6	Minute Maid Park	4:33	43,277
5	October 18	Boston Red Sox – 4, Houston Astros – 1	Minute Maid Park	3:32	43,210

== Game summaries ==
=== Game 1 ===
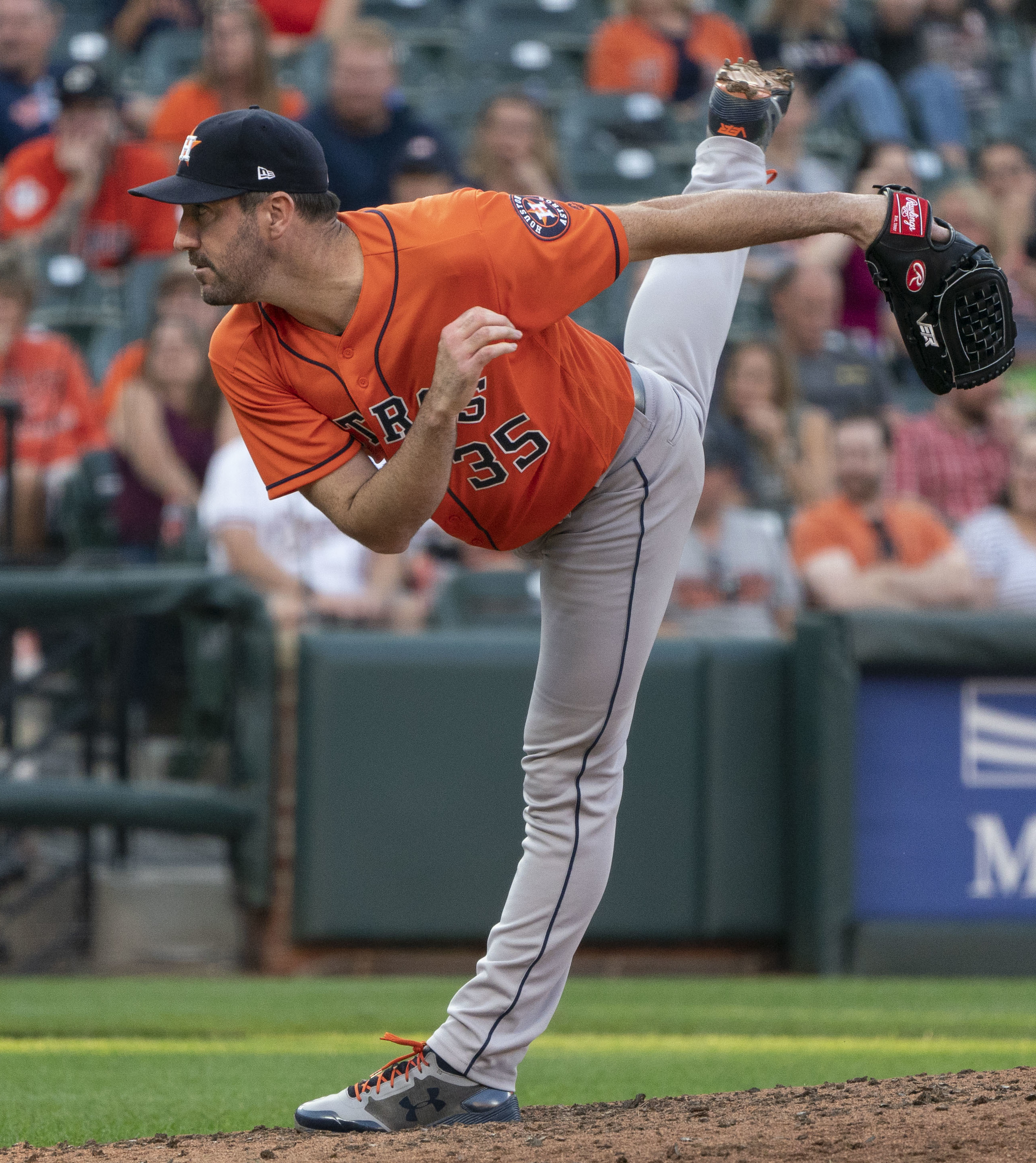
Justin Verlander allowed only two runs and two hits in six innings pitched during Game 1, getting the win.

October 13, 2018 8:10 pm (EDT) at Fenway Park in Boston, Massachusetts, 50 °F (10 °C), clear
Team	1	2	3	4	5	6	7	8	9	R	H	E
Houston	0	2	0	0	0	1	0	0	4	7	5	1
Boston	0	0	0	0	2	0	0	0	0	2	3	1
WP: Justin Verlander (1–0) LP: Joe Kelly (0–1); Home runs: HOU: Josh Reddick (1), Yuli Gurriel (1); BOS: None; Attendance: 38,007; Boxscore

Three-time All-Star and two-time World Series Champion Kevin Youkilis threw out the ceremonial first pitch for the Red Sox. The Astros struck first on a George Springer two-run single in the top of the second off of an erratic Chris Sale, eventually ending Sale's night after four innings. Verlander cruised through four innings before running into trouble in the fifth, walking Mitch Moreland with the bases loaded and allowing Jackie Bradley Jr. to score on a wild pitch to even the score at two. Verlander struck out Andrew Benintendi on a controversial called strike that resulted in Red Sox manager Alex Cora getting ejected in between innings. The Astros responded in the top of the sixth with a two-out RBI single by Carlos Correa after Joe Kelly hit Alex Bregman with a pitch and Yuli Gurriel reached on a fielding error by Eduardo Núñez. Verlander came back to retire the side in order in the sixth. The Astros and Red Sox would trade zeroes until the top of the ninth inning which was led off by a Josh Reddick home run off of Brandon Workman. Workman then, after getting an out, walked Jose Altuve and Alex Bregman before Yuli Gurriel hit a three-run home run to blow the game open at 7–2. The Red Sox ended the night having walked 10 Astros hitters and hitting three more. Collin McHugh came in to finish the game off and give the Astros a loud 1–0 lead in the series.

=== Game 2 ===
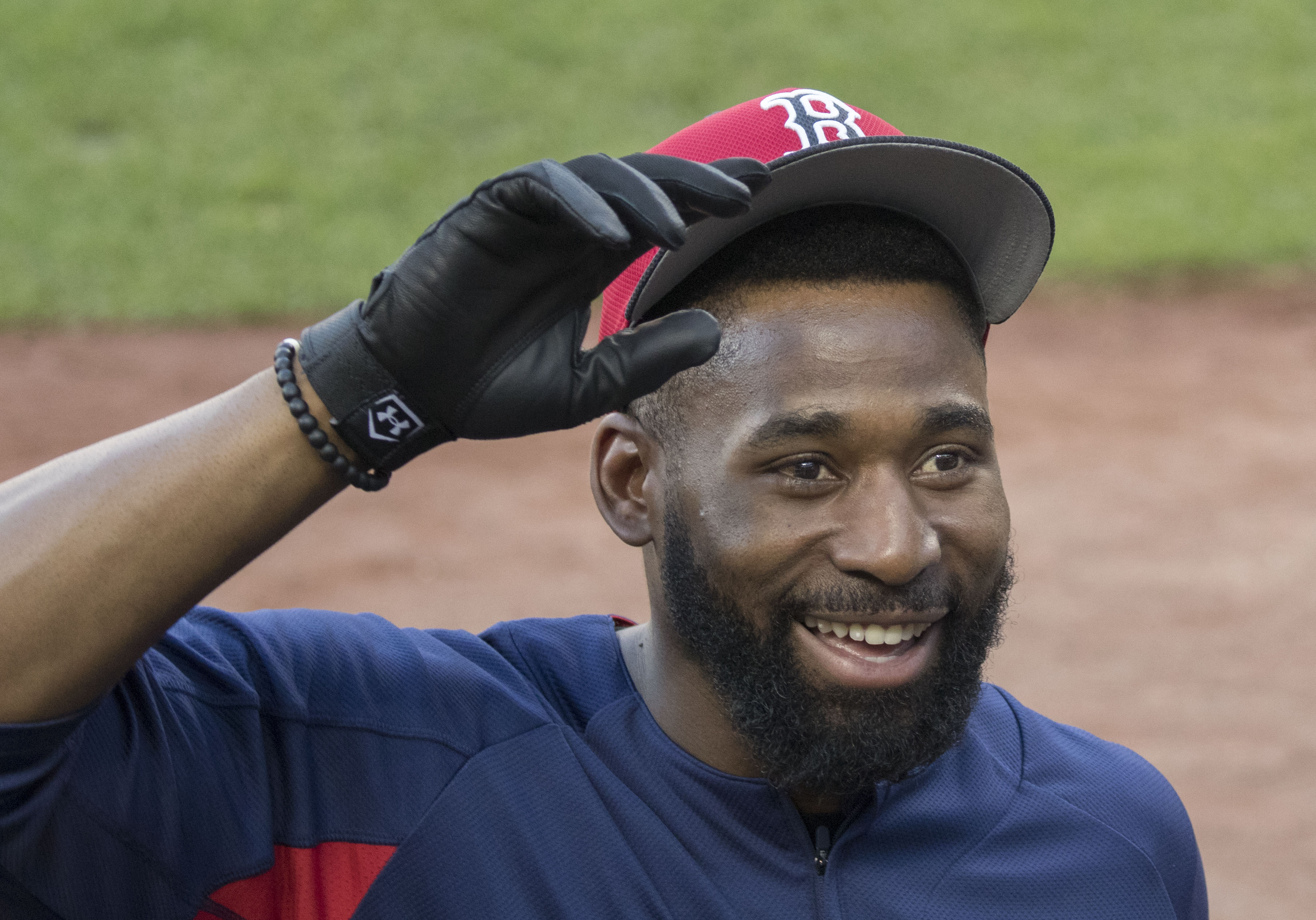
A three-RBI double by Jackie Bradley Jr. gave the Red Sox a 5–4 lead in Game 2.

October 14, 2018 7:10 pm (EDT) at Fenway Park in Boston, Massachusetts, 55 °F (13 °C), partly cloudy
Team	1	2	3	4	5	6	7	8	9	R	H	E
Houston	0	2	2	0	0	0	0	0	1	5	7	1
Boston	2	0	3	0	0	0	1	1	X	7	9	0
WP: Matt Barnes (1–0) LP: Gerrit Cole (0–1) Sv: Craig Kimbrel (1); Home runs: HOU: Marwin González (1); BOS: None; Attendance: 37,960; Boxscore

Jonny Gomes, a member of the 2013 World Series champion Red Sox, threw the ceremonial first pitch. Mookie Betts doubled off Gerrit Cole and Andrew Benintendi singled him home to open the scoring for the Red Sox. Xander Bogaerts reached second on Cole's throwing error with one out in the first, then Rafael Devers singled home Benintendi for a 2–0 lead. Starting pitcher David Price allowed the Astros to get on the board in the second as Carlos Correa hit an infield single and Martín Maldonado doubled, with George Springer doubling them both home to tie it. An inning later, Yuli Gurriel singled and an out later, Marwin González homered over the Green Monster for a 4–2 lead. But the Red Sox struck back in the bottom of the inning. Bogaerts singled, Steve Pearce doubled and Devers walked to load the bases. One out later, Jackie Bradley Jr. hit a bases-clearing double to give the Red Sox a 5–4 lead, which they would never relinquish. Price would fall an out shy of being credited the victory, allowing four runs, five hits, and four walks. Matt Barnes relieved him in the fifth with two outs and retired the next four batters for the victory. In the seventh, after Betts walked, Lance McCullers Jr. threw a wild pitch, advancing Betts to second, then to third on a Maldonado passed ball. One out later, another Maldonado passed ball scored Betts to make it 6–4. The next inning saw Devers single to center; two outs later, Mitch Moreland singled, and A. J. Hinch immediately sent out Héctor Rondón to face Betts, who doubled to center, scoring Devers to extend their lead to three runs. Craig Kimbrel pitched the ninth, allowing a two-out double by Springer and a Jose Altuve RBI single to bring the Astros to within 7–5. Kimbrel then retired Alex Bregman, who flew out to Benintendi to end the game, earning his third save this postseason, and tying the series at one all.

=== Game 3 ===
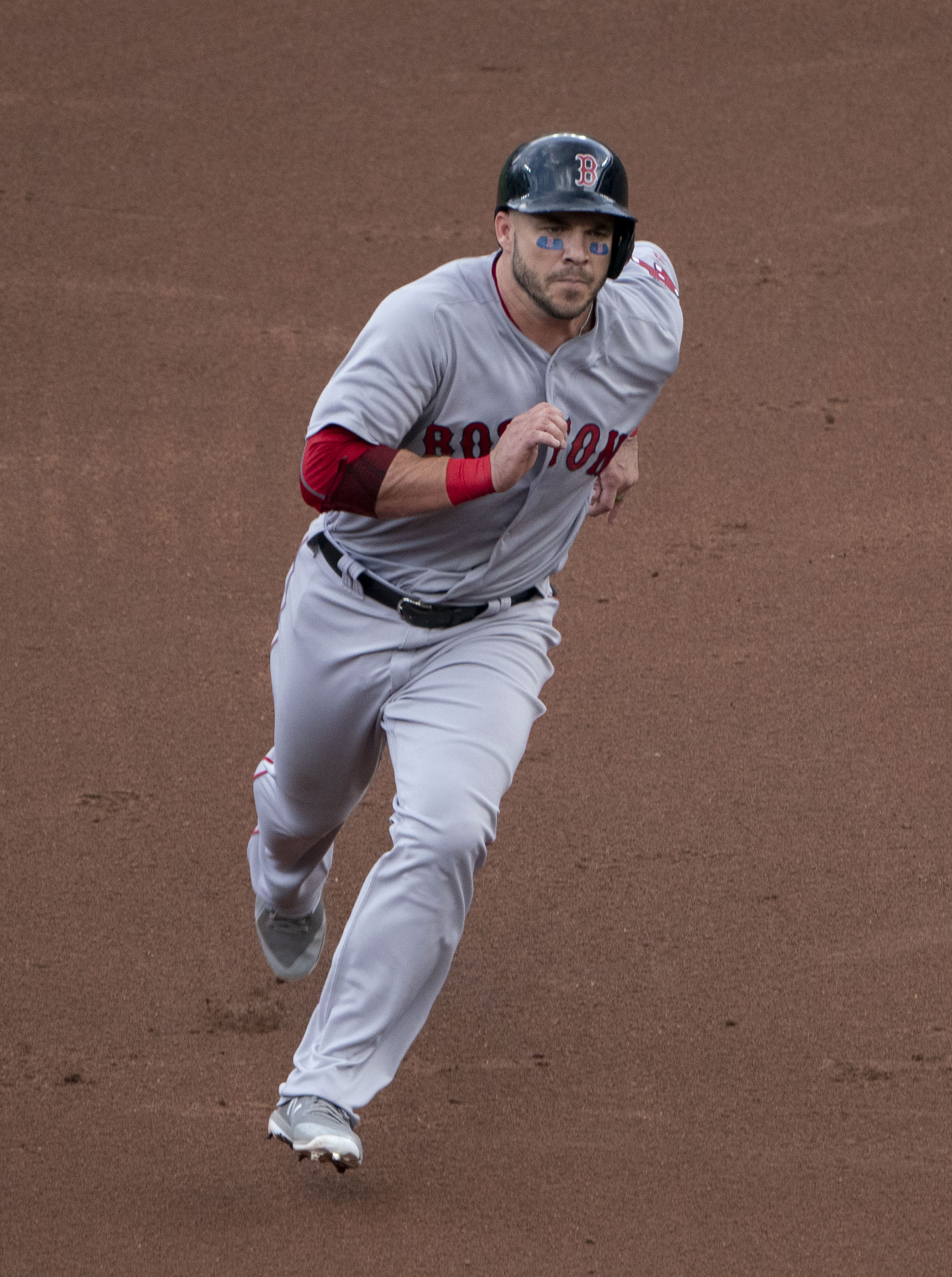
Steve Pearce hit a go-ahead home run in the 6th inning of Game 3.

October 16, 2018 4:10 pm (CDT) at Minute Maid Park in Houston, Texas, 63 °F (17 °C), roof closed
Team	1	2	3	4	5	6	7	8	9	R	H	E
Boston	2	0	0	0	0	1	0	5	0	8	9	0
Houston	1	0	0	0	1	0	0	0	0	2	7	0
WP: Nathan Eovaldi (1–0) LP: Joe Smith (0–1); Home runs: BOS: Steve Pearce (1), Jackie Bradley Jr. (1); HOU: None; Attendance: 43,102; Boxscore

Former Astros All-Star player Lance Berkman threw the ceremonial first pitch. Dallas Keuchel was Houston's starting pitcher, while Nathan Eovaldi started for Boston. The Red Sox jumped out to an early 2–0 lead in the top of the first inning, on two singles, a double, and an RBI ground out. The Astros responded in the bottom of the inning with a run on three singles, trimming Boston's lead to 2–1. Houston tied the game in the bottom of the fifth, as Jose Altuve worked a two-out walk and Alex Bregman drove him in with a double under the glove of Boston third baseman Rafael Devers. In the top of the sixth, Houston reliever Joe Smith took over from Keuchel, who had allowed two runs on four hits in five innings pitched. Smith allowed a home run to Steve Pearce, putting Boston back in the lead, 3–2, which they would never relinquish. In the bottom of the seventh, Ryan Brasier relieved Red Sox starter Eovaldi, who had allowed two runs on six hits in six innings pitched. With two outs in the top of the eighth, Boston had the bases loaded when pinch hitter Mitch Moreland was hit by a pitch from Roberto Osuna, forcing in a run. Jackie Bradley Jr. then hit a grand slam off of Osuna, putting Boston ahead, 8–2. The game ended without further scoring, George Springer striking out to end it. Eovaldi got the win for Boston, while Smith took the loss for Houston.

=== Game 4 ===
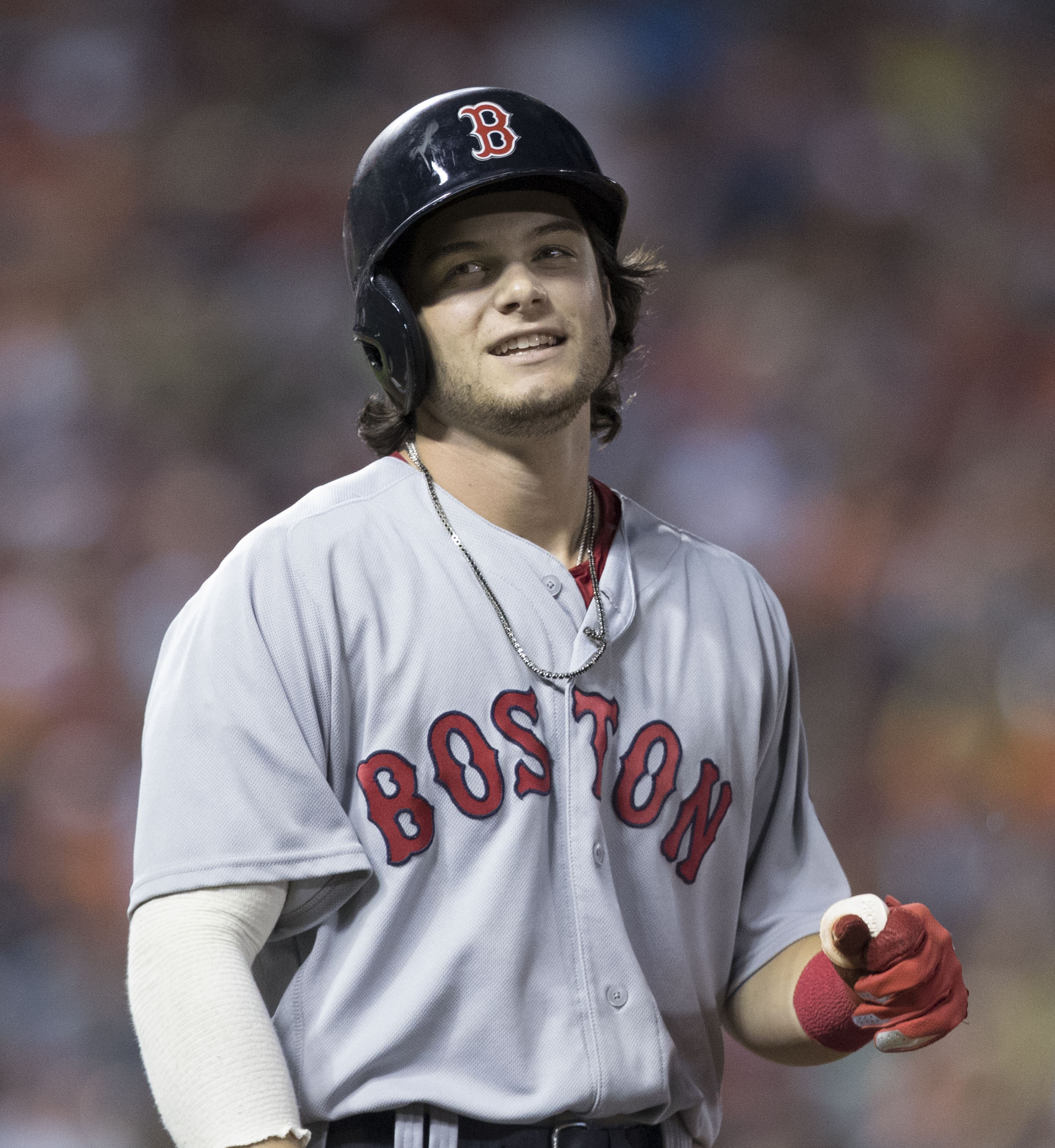
Andrew Benintendi had two doubles, scored twice, and made a game-ending diving catch in Game 4.

October 17, 2018 7:40 pm (CDT) at Minute Maid Park in Houston, Texas, 65 °F (18 °C), roof closed
Team	1	2	3	4	5	6	7	8	9	R	H	E
Boston	2	0	1	0	1	2	1	1	0	8	11	1
Houston	0	1	2	1	1	0	0	1	0	6	13	0
WP: Joe Kelly (1–1) LP: Josh James (0–1) Sv: Craig Kimbrel (2); Home runs: BOS: Jackie Bradley Jr. (2); HOU: George Springer (1), Tony Kemp (1); Attendance: 43,277; Boxscore

Former Astros player Chris Burke, who hit a series-winning home run in the 2005 NLDS, threw the ceremonial first pitch. Charlie Morton started for Houston, his first postseason appearance this year. Boston scored two runs in the first inning, on a hit by pitch, walk, wild pitch, and a two-out RBI single by Rafael Devers. Rick Porcello started for Boston, his second start and fourth appearance of this postseason. In the bottom of the first, a deep drive and potential two-run homer to right field by Jose Altuve, which Mookie Betts nearly caught with a leaping grab at the wall, was ruled an out due to fan interference. The controversial call was made by right field umpire Joe West. Houston got a run back in the bottom of the second, when Josh Reddick led off with a double, and scored on a single by Carlos Correa. In the top of the third, Andrew Benintendi hit a leadoff double, moved to third on a wild pitch, and scored on a double by Xander Bogaerts, giving the Red Sox a 3–1 lead. Josh James relieved Morton during the third, Morton having allowed three runs on three hits in 2 1/3 innings pitched. A George Springer home run to open the bottom of the third cut the lead to 3–2. Altuve then doubled, and was later driven in on a single by Reddick, evening the score, 3–3. A homer by Tony Kemp in the bottom of the fourth put the Astros ahead, 4–3. In the top of the fifth, Benintendi again doubled and was driven in by Bogaerts, tying the game at four all. Porcello, who had allowed four runs on seven hits, was relieved by Joe Kelly for the bottom of the fifth; Yuli Gurriel singled, advanced to second on a wild pitch, and scored on a single by Correa, putting the Astros back ahead, 5–4. Jackie Bradley Jr. hit a two-run homer in the top of the sixth, giving the Red Sox a 6–5 lead, which they would not relinquish. In the seventh, Boston added a run on a single and three walks. An inning later, Betts singled, advanced to second on a wild pitch, and scored on a single by J. D. Martinez, increasing Boston's lead to 8–5. In the bottom of the eighth, Alex Bregman was hit by a pitch, advanced to third on a Springer double, and scored on a ground out by Altuve, trimming Boston's lead to 8–6. Red Sox closer Craig Kimbrel allowed three walks in the bottom of the ninth to load the bases, but got the final out on Benintendi's diving catch off a Bregman liner to left, for his fourth save this postseason.

At four hours and 33 minutes, this was the second-longest nine-inning postseason game in MLB history; 2017 NLDS Game 5 between the Chicago Cubs and Washington Nationals was four minutes longer.

=== Game 5 ===
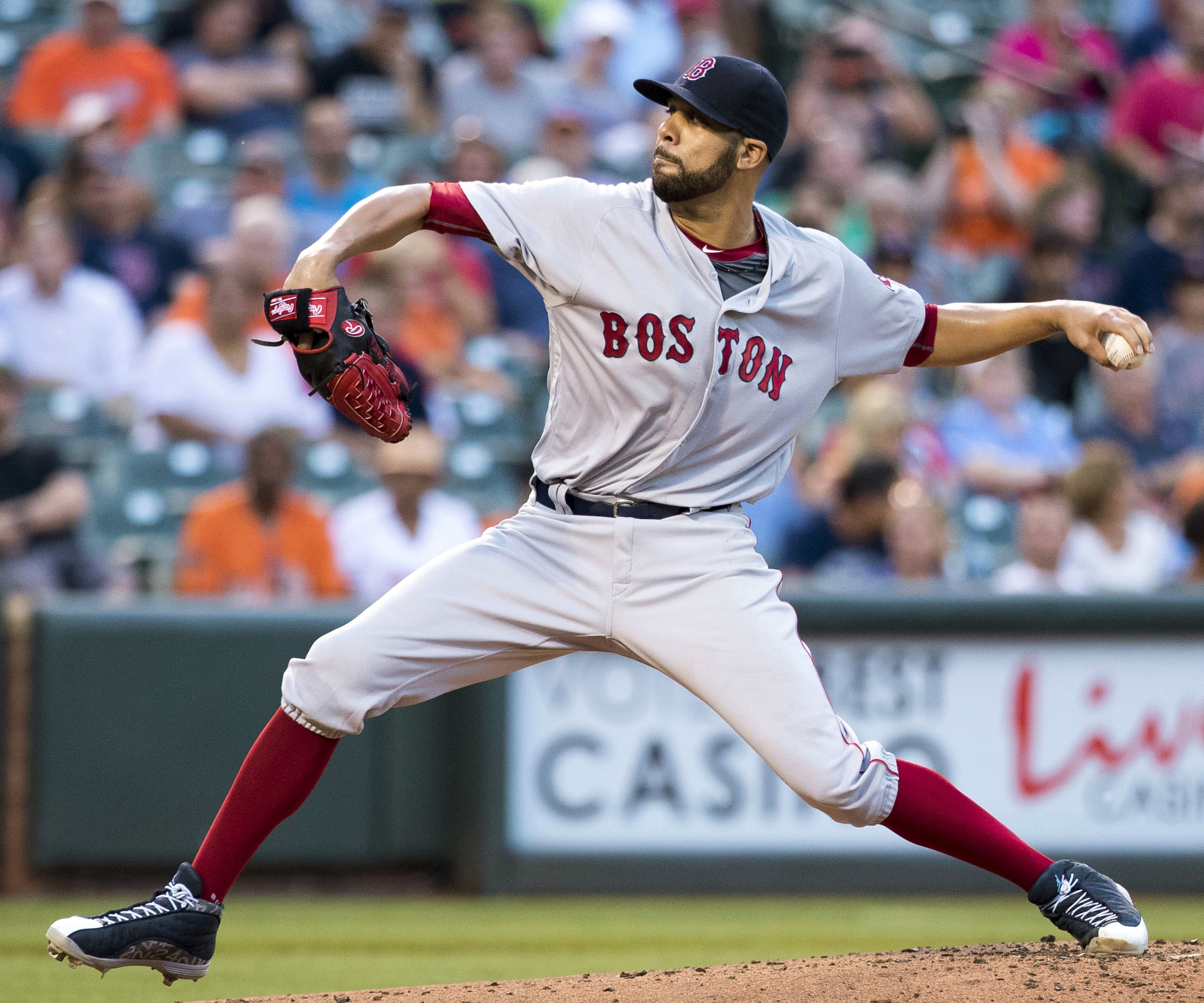
Boston starter David Price struck out nine and got the Game 5 win, as Boston advanced to the World Series.

October 18, 2018 7:10 pm (CDT) at Minute Maid Park in Houston, Texas, 67 °F (19 °C), roof closed
Team	1	2	3	4	5	6	7	8	9	R	H	E
Boston	0	0	1	0	0	3	0	0	0	4	8	0
Houston	0	0	0	0	0	0	1	0	0	1	5	1
WP: David Price (1–0) LP: Justin Verlander (1–1) Sv: Craig Kimbrel (3); Home runs: BOS: J. D. Martinez (1), Rafael Devers (1); HOU: Marwin González (2); Attendance: 43,210; Boxscore

Former Astros All-Star player Jeff Kent threw the ceremonial first pitch. Justin Verlander, Game 1 winning pitcher, started for Houston, while David Price, who got a no decision in Game 2, started for Boston. Chris Sale did not start for Boston due to the effects of being ill after Game 1. Boston took a 1–0 lead in the top of the third inning on a home run by J. D. Martinez, which they would not relinquish. In the top of the sixth, Mitch Moreland doubled, Ian Kinsler singled, and Rafael Devers homered into the Crawford Boxes, putting Boston ahead, 4–0. Houston reliever Roberto Osuna entered to pitch the top of the seventh, replacing Verlander who had allowed four runs on seven hits in six innings pitched, while striking out four and walking two. Boston's Matt Barnes entered to pitch the bottom of the seventh, replacing Price who had allowed no runs on three hits in six innings pitched, while striking out nine and walking none. Marwin González hit a two-out homer to left, reducing Boston's lead to 4–1. Boston's starter from Game 3, Nathan Eovaldi, came on in relief of Barnes, getting the final out of the seventh and holding Houston scoreless in the eighth. Osuna pitched through the ninth for Houston, allowing only one hit during his three innings. Red Sox closer Craig Kimbrel entered to pitch the bottom of the ninth. Carlos Correa struck out, Yuli Gurriel walked, González struck out, and Tony Kemp flied out to end the game and send the Red Sox to the World Series. Kimbrel recorded his fifth save this postseason, while for Price, it was his first victory in 12 career postseason starts; his only previous postseason wins came as a reliever. As for Houston, their World Series reign was over, though they later won AL pennants in 2019, 2021 (which included a ALCS re-match with the Red Sox) and 2022, as well as a World Series again in 2022.

Boston's Jackie Bradley Jr., who had nine RBIs in the series on three hits (a double and two home runs), was named ALCS MVP.

=== Composite line score ===
2018 ALCS (4–1): Boston Red Sox beat Houston Astros

Team	1	2	3	4	5	6	7	8	9	R	H	E
Houston Astros	1	5	4	1	2	1	1	1	5	21	37	3
Boston Red Sox	6	0	5	0	3	6	2	7	0	29	40	2
Total attendance: 205,556 Average attendance: 41,111

== Aftermath ==
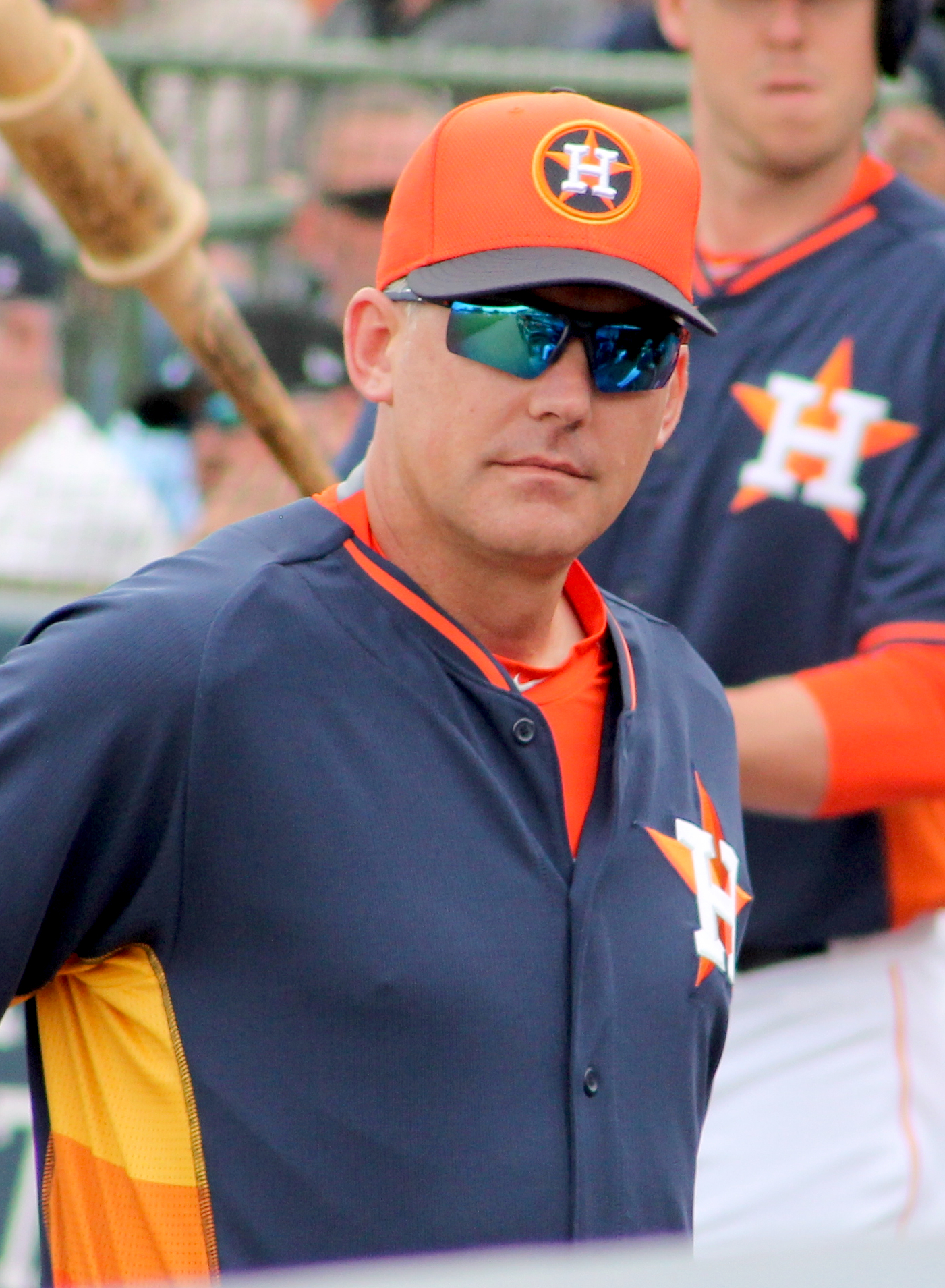
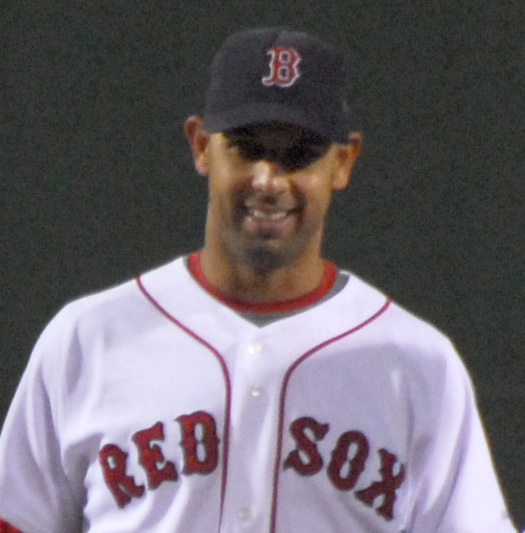
Managers A. J. Hinch (left) and Alex Cora (right) were both suspended for a full season in 2020

A year later, both ALCS managers, Alex Cora and A.J. Hinch, would receive season-long bans from MLB due to their role in the Houston Astros sign stealing scandal, which alleged the organization used a video camera in the center field seats to observe the opposing catcher as he instructed the pitcher about the next pitch during the 2017 and parts of the 2018 seasons. MLB's investigation determined that Red Sox manager Alex Cora, along with veteran player Carlos Beltrán, helped mastermind the Astros' sign-stealing while serving as Hinch's bench coach in 2017. Cora and Hinch served their suspensions in 2020; Cora was quickly re-hired by the Red Sox, while Hinch was hired to manage the Detroit Tigers.

In addition to Houston's sign stealing scandal, an MLB investigation also found the Red Sox' guilty of electronic sign stealing in 2018, though the report noted it "limited in scope and impact" compared to Houston.

A rematch occurred three years later in the 2021 American League Championship Series, with the Astros winning the series in six games after being down 2–1 in the series.

Alex Bregman would play for the Alex Cora and Red Sox later in his career for one season in 2025. Bregman turned down a contract offer from former manager Hinch and the Tigers, before signing with Boston.

== See also ==
- 2018 National League Championship Series
