= List of Nova Southeastern University alumni =

This list of Nova Southeastern University alumni includes notable graduate and non-graduate former students of Nova Southeastern University.

== Academia ==
- Joe W. Aguillard, president of Louisiana College in Pineville, Louisiana since 2005
- Carole Ward Allen, former professor and administrator, Laney College
- H. Edward Croom, president of University of Mount Olive in Mount Olive, North Carolina since 2020
- Helen Rose Dawson, academic dean and vice president of Villa Julie College (1965 to 1999)
- Willie Gilchrist, chancellor of Elizabeth City State University
- Maureen Kenny, professor of psychology at Florida International University
- Arcadia Hernández López, educator and bilingual instruction innovator; earned her doctorate at Nova
- Rafael Cartagena Ródriguez, educator and former secretary of education of Puerto Rico

== Entertainment ==
- Somy Ali, Bollywood actress, writer, model, filmmaker, and activist
- Will Kirby, celebrity dermatologist, winner of Big Brother and star of Dr. 90210
- Jillian Wunderlich, Miss Florida Teen USA 2008 and Miss Teen USA 2008 (Top 15), Miss Indiana USA 2011 and Miss USA 2011 (Top 16)

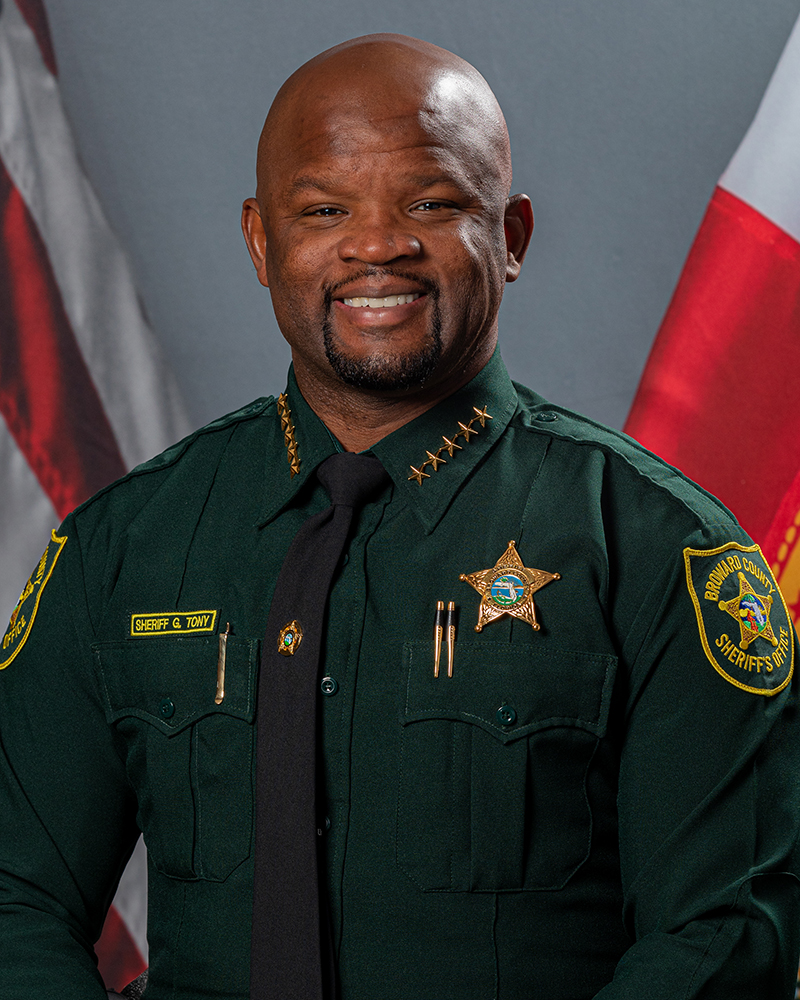
Gregory Tony

== Law ==
- Yale Galanter (born 1956), lawyer and legal commentator
- Sheri Polster Chappell, judge for the District Court for Middle District
- Victoria Sigler, circuit judge for the State of Florida, 11th Circuit
- Gregory Tony (born 1978), sheriff of Broward County, Florida

== Military ==
- Michelle Fraley, retired U.S. Army colonel
- Leroy Gilbert, chaplain of the U.S. Coast Guard

== Politics ==
- James Bush III, Florida state representative, 106th District, Miami, Florida
- Carmine DeSopo (born 1940), member of the New Jersey General Assembly
- Michael Ferguson, Florida state representative, 100th District, Lauderdale-by-the-Sea, Florida
- Marty Kiar, Florida state representative, 97th District, Davie, Florida
- Jared Moskowitz, vice mayor, Parkland, Florida, US House of Representatives
- Ari Porth, Florida state representative, 96th District, Coral Springs, Florida
- Isabel Saint Malo, vice president of Panama
- Keith Sonderling, 31st United States Secretary of Labor
- Nick Thompson, Florida State Representative 73rd District, Fort Myers, Florida
- Jim Waldman, Florida state representative, 95th District, Coconut Creek, Florida

== Sports ==
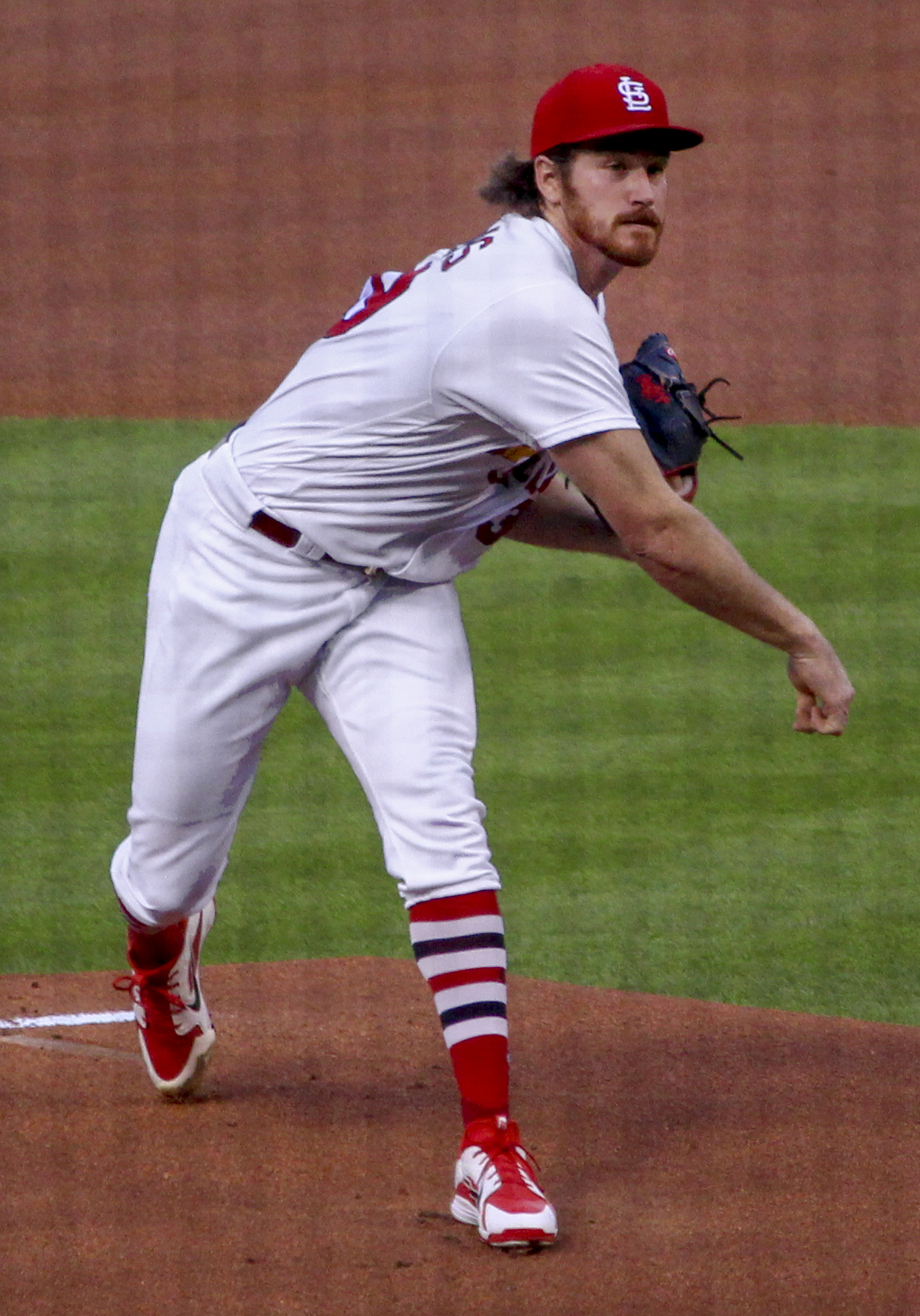
Miles Mikolas

- Tim Coenraad, professional basketball player for the Illawarra Hawks in National Basketball League (NBL)
- Michael Fiers, pitcher in Major League Baseball (MLB) who has thrown two no-hitters
- J. D. Martinez, MLB All-Star right fielder and 2018 World Series champion for the Boston Red Sox
- Miles Mikolas, MLB All-Star pitcher for the St Louis Cardinals and formerly for the Yomiuri Giants in Nippon Professional Baseball (NPB)
- Esau Simpson, Grenadian swimmer in the 2012 Summer Olympics
- Shelley Solomon (1963–2014), professional tennis player

== Other ==
- Scott W. Rothstein, mastermind behind $1.2 billion Ponzi scheme
- Louis Sola, commissioner, Federal Maritime Commission
