= J. D. Martinez =

American baseball player (born 1987)

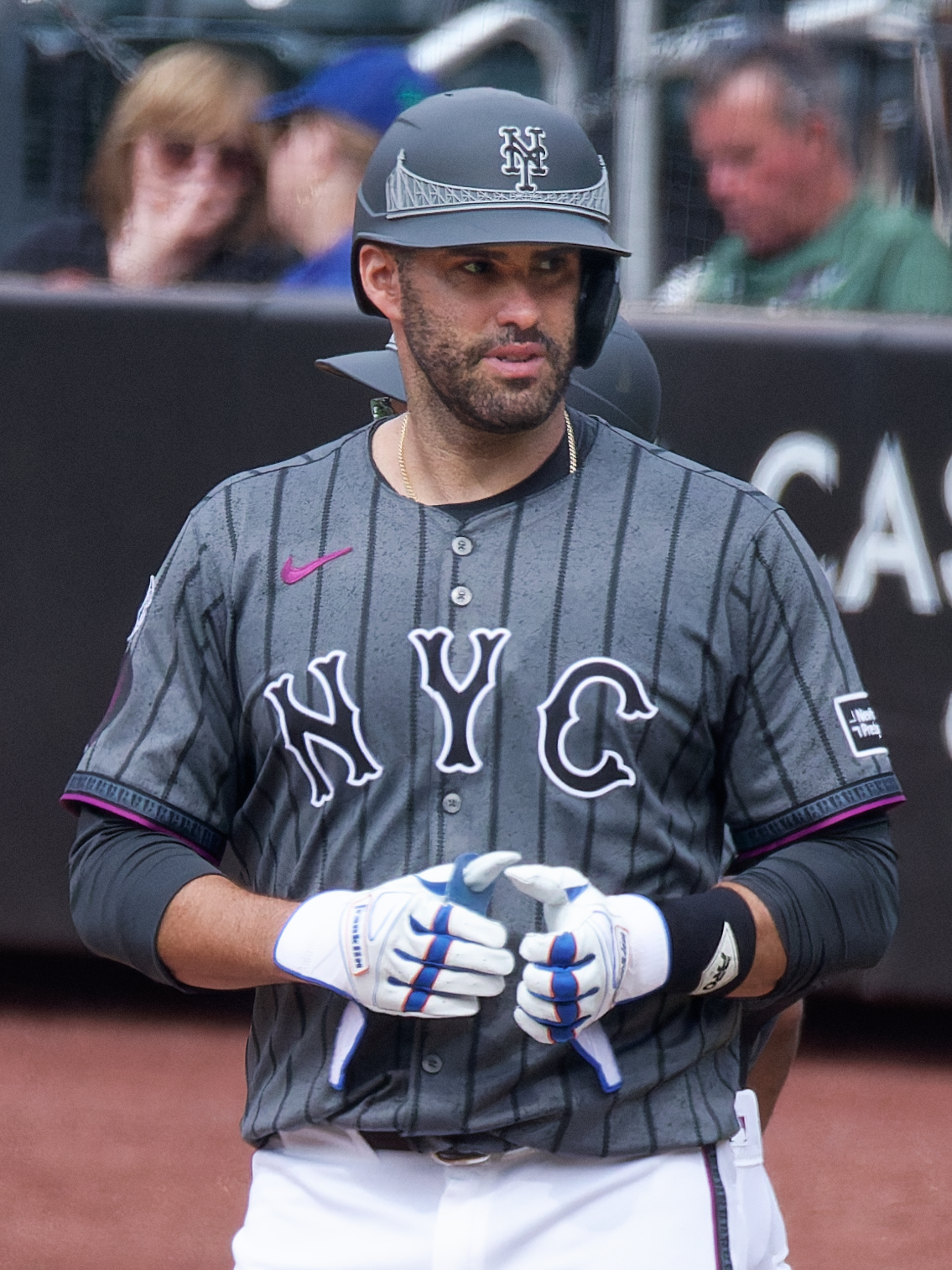
- Martinez with the New York Mets in 2024
- Outfielder / Designated hitter
- Born: August 21, 1987 (age 39); Miami, Florida, U.S.
- Batted: Right Threw: Right

MLB debut
- July 30, 2011, for the Houston Astros

Last MLB appearance
- September 30, 2024, for the New York Mets

MLB statistics
- Batting average: .283
- Home runs: 331
- Runs batted in: 1,071
- Stats at Baseball Reference

Teams
- Houston Astros (2011–2013); Detroit Tigers (2014–2017); Arizona Diamondbacks (2017); Boston Red Sox (2018–2022); Los Angeles Dodgers (2023); New York Mets (2024)

Career highlights and awards
- 6× All-Star (2015, 2018, 2019, 2021–2023); World Series champion (2018); 3× Silver Slugger Award (2015, 2018²); AL Hank Aaron Award (2018); AL RBI leader (2018); Hit four home runs in one game on September 4, 2017

Julio Daniel Martinez (born August 21, 1987) is an American former professional baseball outfielder and designated hitter. He played in Major League Baseball (MLB) for the Houston Astros, Detroit Tigers, Arizona Diamondbacks, Boston Red Sox, Los Angeles Dodgers, and New York Mets. He made his MLB debut in 2011. A right-handed thrower and batter, Martinez stands 6 feet 3 inches (1.91 m) tall and weighs 230 pounds (100 kg).

Martinez played college baseball at Nova Southeastern University (NSU) and was selected by the Astros in the 20th round of the 2009 MLB draft. He is the first player drafted from NSU to play in the major leagues. He is a six-time MLB All-Star selection and a three-time Silver Slugger Award winner, as well as the only player to earn the latter honor twice in the same season.

On September 4, 2017, Martinez became the 18th player in MLB history to hit four home runs in a single game, doing so versus the Los Angeles Dodgers. During the Red Sox' 2018 World Series run, he won the American League (AL) Hank Aaron Award as the league's top offensive performer, leading the league in RBI, while placing second in batting average and home runs. He also won the 2018 Players Choice Award for Player of the Year.

== Playing career ==
=== Amateur career ===
Martinez attended Flanagan High School in Pembroke Pines, Florida, and graduated in 2006. The Minnesota Twins selected Martinez in the 36th round, with the 1,086th overall selection, of the 2006 Major League Baseball draft, but he did not sign with the Twins.

Instead, Martinez attended Nova Southeastern University (NSU), where he played college baseball for the Sharks from 2007 through 2009. He set the school's career record for home runs with 32, ranked second in batting average (.394), third in runs batted in (RBIs, 142), and fourth in slugging percentage (.691). In 2009, he batted .428 with 15 home runs and set a program record with 73 runs scored. He was a two-time All-Sunshine State Conference baseball player.

In 2014, Martinez was inducted into the NSU Sharks Hall of Fame.

=== Houston Astros ===
==== Draft and minor leagues ====
The Houston Astros selected Martinez in the 20th round of the 2009 Major League Baseball draft with the 611th overall selection. He was signed by Greg Brown, who later became the head coach at NSU. Martinez started his professional career with the Greeneville Astros of the Rookie-level Appalachian League, where he batted .403 before earning a promotion to the Tri-City ValleyCats of the Class A-Short Season New York–Penn League.

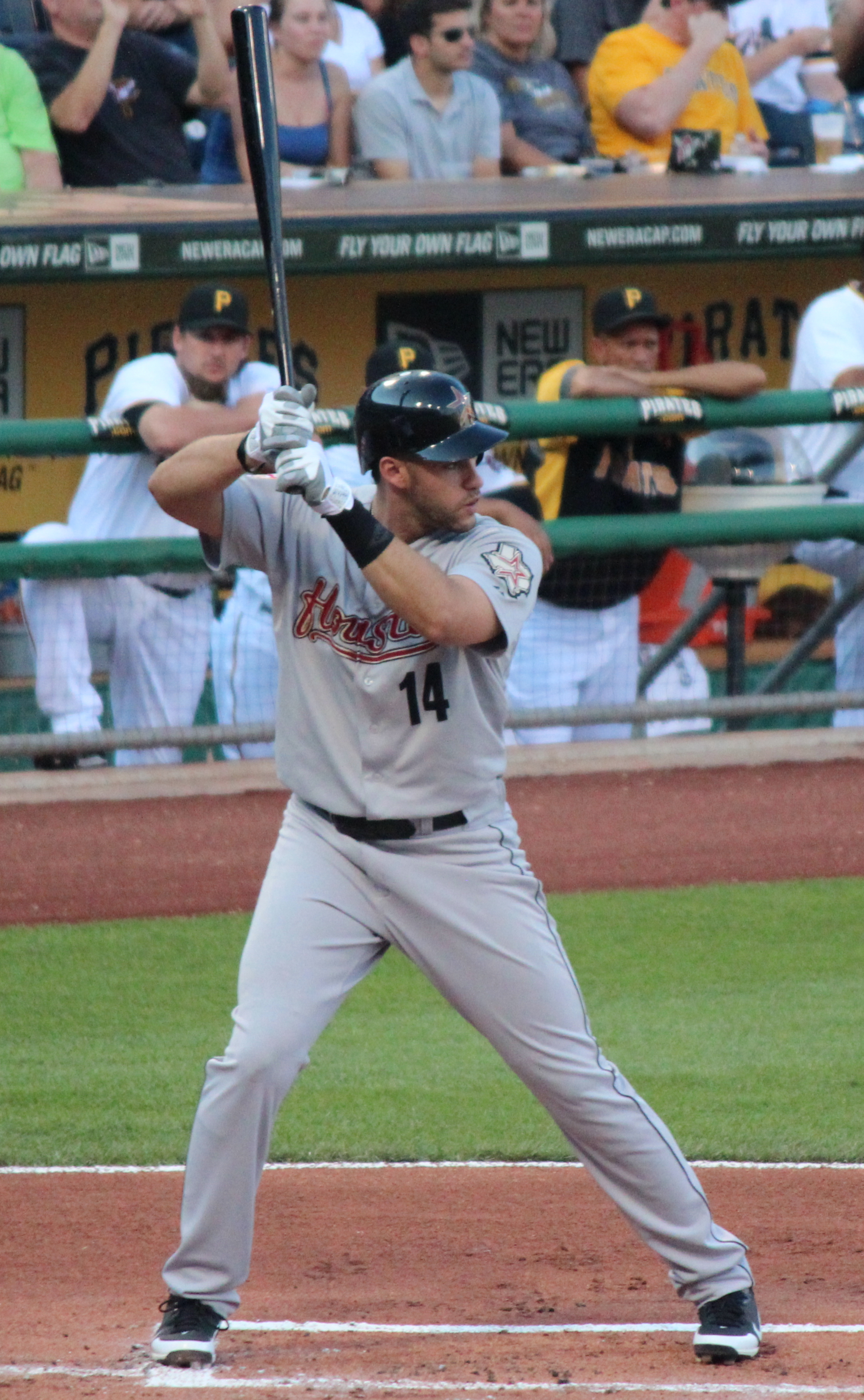
Martinez batting for the Houston Astros in 2012

Martinez started the 2010 season with Lexington Legends of the Class A South Atlantic League (SAL) before earning a mid-season promotion to the Corpus Christi Hooks of the Class AA Texas League. He led SAL in each of batting (.362), on-base percentage (.433), and slugging percentage (.598). At the time of his promotion to the Texas League, he also led the SAL in hits, doubles, extra-base hits, runs scored, and total bases. Martinez was honored as SAL Player of the Year, Most Valuable Player (MVP), and the Houston Astros' Minor League Player of the Year.

Martinez started the 2011 season with Corpus Christi; over 88 games, he batted .338/.414/.552/.959, 25 doubles, 13 home runs, 72 RBIs, 42 bases on balls, and 55 strikeouts. He was named a Texas League All-Star.

==== 2011 ====
On July 30, 2011, the Astros called up Martinez to replace Hunter Pence, whom they had traded to the Philadelphia Phillies. Martinez became the first player drafted from Nova Southeastern University to debut in Major League Baseball. The following month, he drove in 28 runs, establishing an Astros rookie record for one month.

==== 2012 ====
On April 13, 2012, Martinez hit the first-ever home run in the new Marlins Park. With a runner on in the eighth, he hit an Edward Mujica offering into the Clevelander bar beyond the left-field wall for a game-tying home run. He led the club with 55 RBIs in 2012.

==== 2013 ====
During a batting practice session in July 2013, hitting coach John Mallee confronted Martinez about his swing: unless he changed his approach to hitting, the best-case scenario for his playing career would be to "bounce between the big leagues and the minors." As difficult as the message was for Martinez to accept at the time, he pondered Mallee's words. The next month, while in the trainer's room after spraining his left wrist, Martinez watched ESPN highlights of Milwaukee Brewers' slugger Ryan Braun batting. He realized that his swing bore no resemblance to Braun's. From there, he began to dedicate himself to studying other top MLB hitters including Albert Pujols and Miguel Cabrera to investigate what improvements he could make to his swing to become a more successful hitter. He then observed teammate Jason Castro, who had just made the All-Star team and was on pace to triple his home run output, and realized, "Castro's got the same swing they do." Martinez asked Castro how he had learned his technique, to which he replied, "You've got to see my guys in California." The day after the season ended, Martinez was in Santa Clarita for an appointment with hitting experts Robert Van Scoyoc and Craig Wallenbrock.

After two weeks in Santa Clarita, Martinez traveled to play for the Leones del Caracas in the Venezuelan Professional Baseball League. In one month, he batted .312 with six home runs and a .957 OPS. Of greater import was the response of the ball each time he hit it: there was a feeling of newfound mastery. However eager Martinez was to demonstrate this increased prowess to general manager Jeff Luhnow and manager Bo Porter, they remained unconvinced. He played sparingly the following spring training, receiving 18 total at bats and collecting three hits. The Astros outrighted Martinez off the major league roster on November 20, 2013, and released him on March 22, 2014. After three years and 252 games in an Astro uniform, Martinez had hit .251 with 24 home runs.

=== Detroit Tigers ===
==== 2014 ====
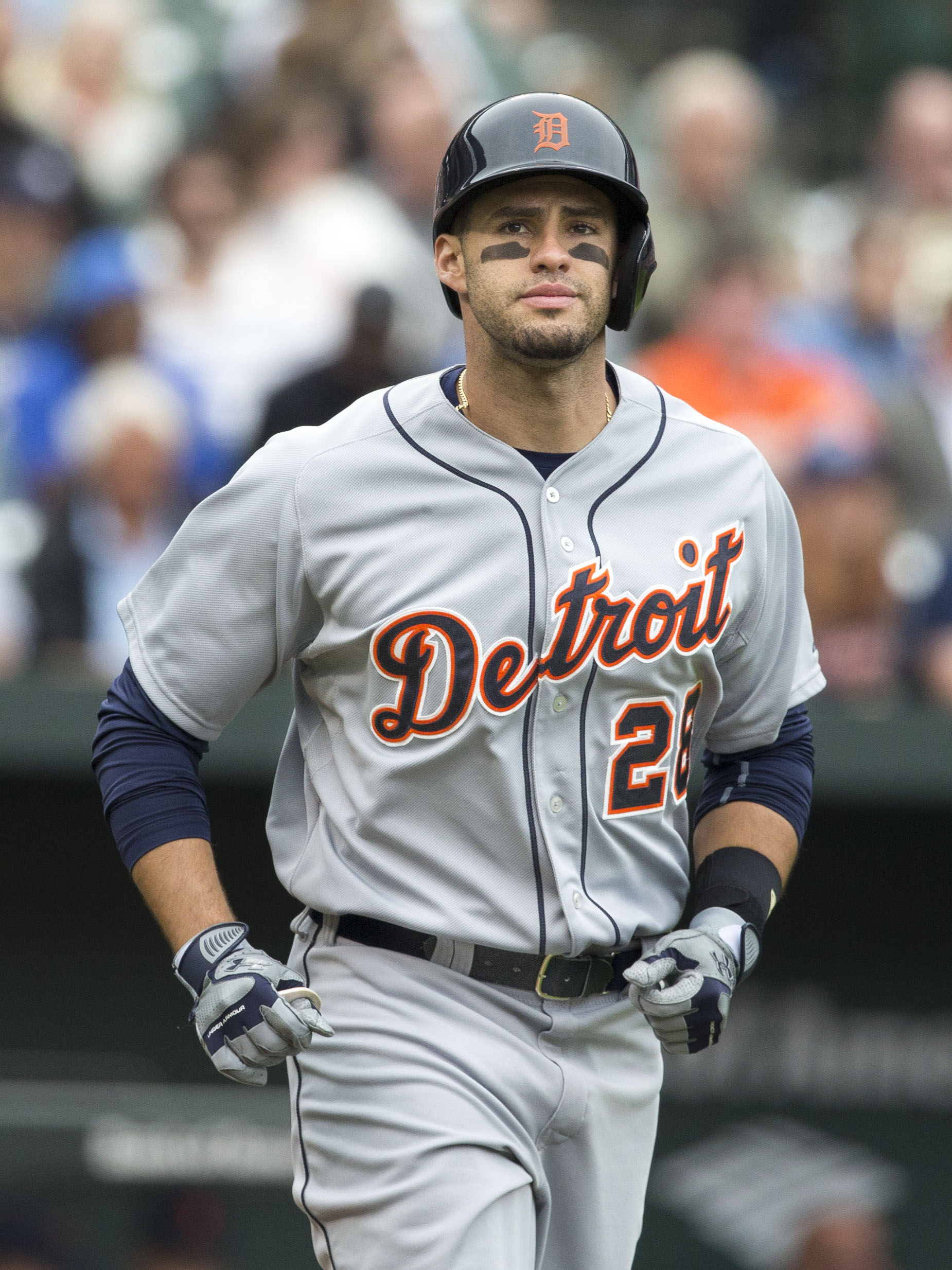
J.D. Martinez during the 2014 season.

On March 24, 2014, the Detroit Tigers signed Martinez to a minor-league contract. After hitting 10 home runs and driving in 22 runs over his first 17 games with the Triple-A Toledo Mud Hens, the Tigers purchased Martinez' contract, and recalled him to the roster to play his first game on April 21.

Martinez was awarded the American League (AL) Player of the Week Award for the period ending June 22, 2014. He batted .444 (12-for-27) with three doubles, four home runs (including one grand slam), 11 RBIs, and six runs scored in seven games to win his first career weekly honor. Martinez was named the Detroit Tigers' Player of the Month for June, posting a .345 average with nine doubles, seven home runs and 21 RBIs, including a career-high 14 game hit streak. He tied for third place in the American League in home runs.

Martinez authored a breakout regular season in 2014, finishing with 30 doubles, 23 home runs, 76 RBIs, .315 batting average, and a .912 OPS, all career-highs to that point in his major league career. He was second on the club in batting, slugging percentage (.553), and OPS, and third in home runs. He was named a finalist for the MLBPA's Players Choice Award for AL Comeback Player of the Year.

On October 3, during Game 2 of the American League Division Series (ALDS) against the Baltimore Orioles, Martinez became the first player in Tigers history—and just the 16th major leaguer—to hit a home run in each of his first two career postseason games. Martinez finished the postseason with one double, two home runs, and five RBIs in three games as the Tigers were swept by the Orioles.

==== 2015 ====
On January 16, 2015, Martinez and the Tigers avoided arbitration when the two parties agreed on a one-year, $3 million contract for the 2015 season. On June 21, Martinez hit three home runs and had six RBIs in a game against the New York Yankees, becoming the first Tigers player to do so since Miguel Cabrera did it in May 2013. Martinez was awarded the AL Player of the Week award for the period ending July 5. He batted .458 (11 for 24) with six runs scored, four home runs, one double, and 10 RBIs in six games to win his second career weekly honor. He paced the Majors in slugging percentage (1.000) and total bases (24) and finished tied for first in home runs. Among AL leaders, he finished tied for first in on-base percentage (.500), second in RBIs, third in batting average, tied for third in hits, and tied for fourth in runs scored. On July 6, 2015, Martinez was named as a reserve for the American League at the 2015 All-Star Game.

Martinez finished the season with a .282 batting average and reached career highs of 33 doubles, 38 home runs, and 102 RBIs. His 38 home runs marked the third-highest total by a Tigers outfielder, trailing only Rocky Colavito's 45 in 1961 and Hank Greenberg's 41 in 1940. Martinez's 102 RBIs marked the most by a Tiger outfielder since Magglio Ordóñez drove in 103 in 2008. Martinez's 319 total bases ranked fifth among all AL hitters. His 109 runs created ranked eighth, and his .897 OPS ranked ninth. He had the highest percentage of hard-hit batted balls in the majors (42.8%). Following the 2015 season, Martinez was awarded his first career Silver Slugger Award. He was named the 2015 Tiger of the Year by the Detroit chapter of the Baseball Writers' Association of America.

Martinez was also a finalist for his first Gold Glove Award in right field, but the award went to Kole Calhoun of the Angels. Martinez' 15 outfield assists tied for third in the AL, his .993 fielding percentage led all AL right fielders, and his 7.7 ultimate zone rating ranked second among AL right fielders.

==== 2016 ====
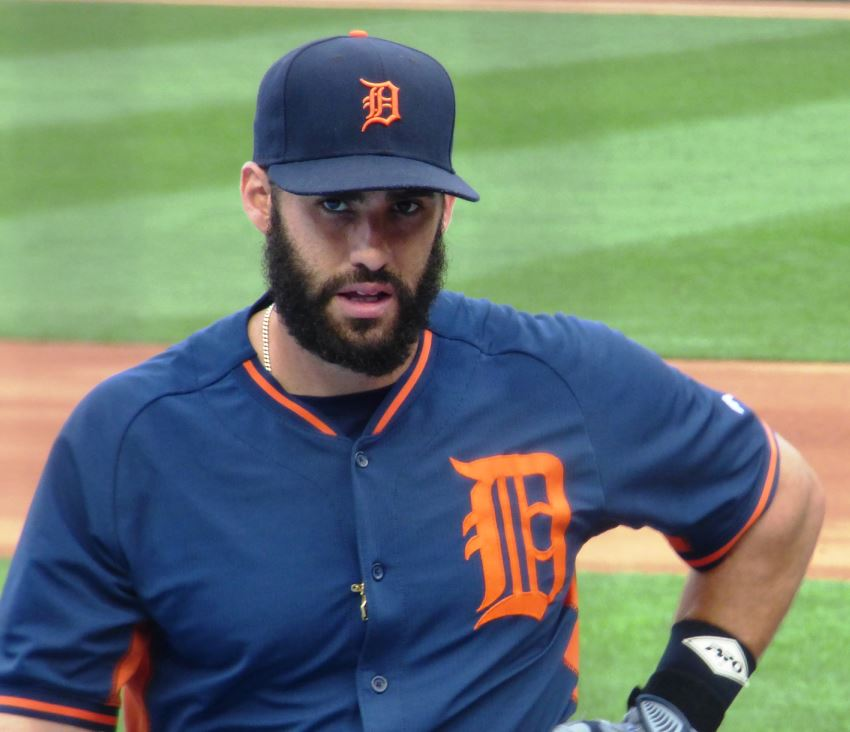
Martinez with the Tigers

On February 8, 2016, the Tigers signed Martinez to a two-year, $18.5 million contract extension.

Martinez was placed on the 15-day disabled list after a June 16 game against the Kansas City Royals, having suffered a non-displaced fracture in his right elbow caused by running into the outfield wall. At the time of the injury, Martinez was hitting .286 with 12 home runs and 39 RBIs.

On August 3 against the Chicago White Sox, in his first game after being activated from the disabled list, Martinez hit a pinch-hit game-winning solo home run off Chris Sale on the first pitch of the at-bat. Martinez played 120 games in the injury-shortened 2016 season and hit .307 with 22 home runs and 68 RBI.

==== 2017 ====
During a spring training game on March 18, 2017, Martinez left the game with an apparent foot injury. One week later, on March 25, further tests revealed that there was a lisfranc sprain in his right foot. As a result, Martinez began the season on the 10-day disabled list, with 3–4 weeks to recover. He rejoined the Tigers on May 12 after a four–game rehab stint with Toledo.

Martinez was awarded the AL Player of the Week award for the period ending May 21. Martinez batted .389 (7 for 18) with seven runs scored, four home runs, and nine RBIs while reaching base 17 times in six games to win his third career weekly honor. Next, Martinez was awarded the AL Player of the Week award for the period ending July 16. Martinez batted .454 (5 for 11), with two runs scored, two home runs, and seven RBIs in three games to win his fourth career weekly honor. During the 2017 season with the Tigers, Martinez batted .305 with 16 home runs, 39 RBIs, and a 1.018 OPS. Over four seasons with the Tigers, he hit .300 with 99 home runs, 285 RBIs, and a .912 OPS.

=== Arizona Diamondbacks ===
On July 18, 2017, the Tigers traded Martinez to the Arizona Diamondbacks for Dawel Lugo, Sergio Alcántara, and Jose King.

On September 4, Martinez hit four home runs versus the Los Angeles Dodgers to become the 18th major leaguer and first Diamondbacks player to hit four home runs in the same game. Each home run came in four consecutive at-bats against four different pitchers. As the Dodgers collectively obtained three hits, Martinez's achievement of four home runs made him the first with that distinction to realize more home runs than the opposing team had total hits. The first came in the fourth inning; he then hit a home run in each of the seventh, eighth, and ninth innings, becoming the first player in the modern era to do so. He hit four home runs in a game less than three months after Scooter Gennett hit four while playing for the Cincinnati Reds. Martinez won the following National League (NL) Player of the Week Award—ending September 10—after batting .429, seven total home runs, and 11 RBIs.

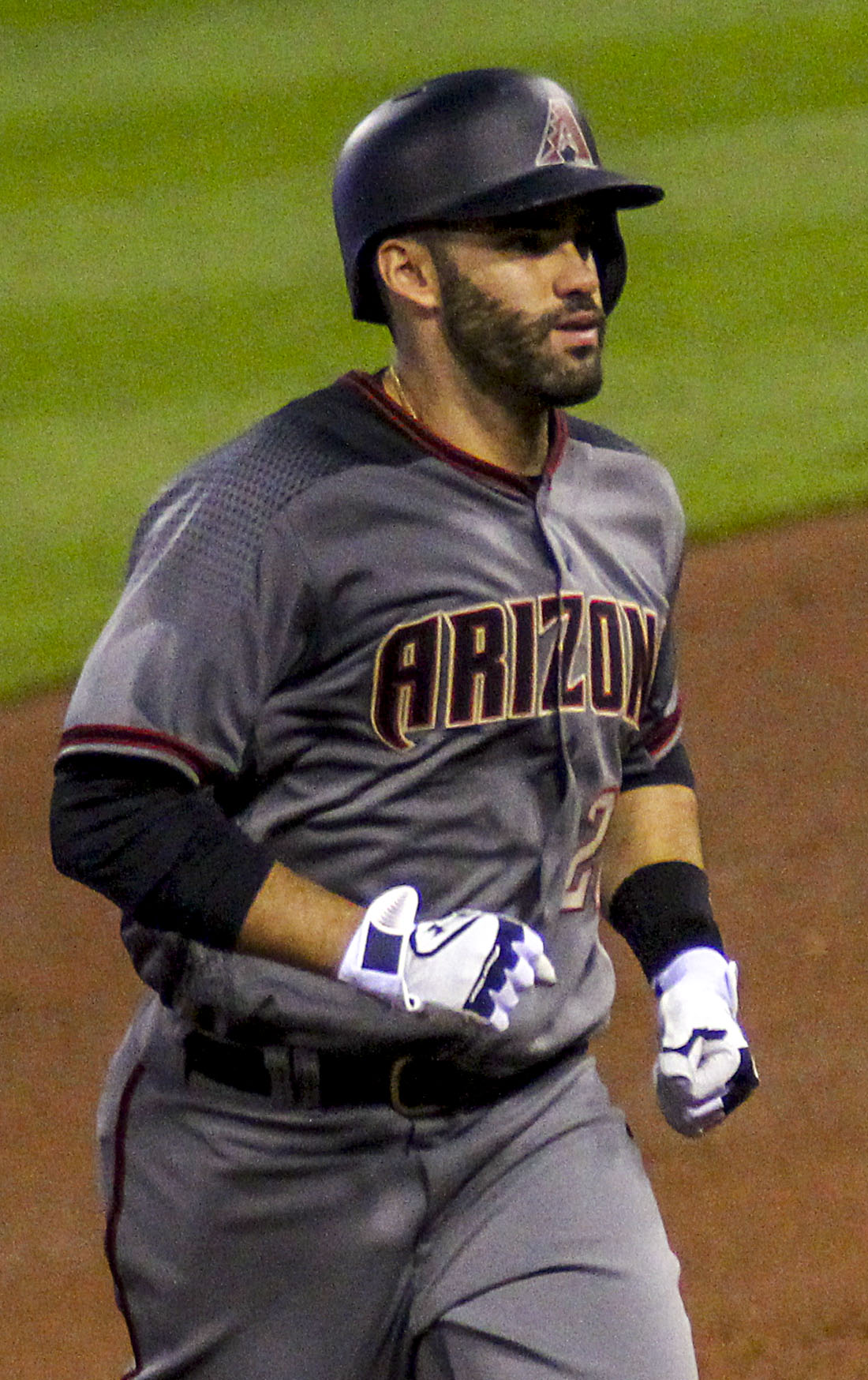
Martinez with the Arizona Diamondbacks in 2017

On September 17, Martinez recorded his 40th home run of the season, doing so against the San Francisco Giants, and reaching the milestone for the first time in his career. He became just the fifth player to reach 40 home runs while playing for two different teams in one season. He was awarded the NL Player of the Week award for the period ending September 17, during which he batted .435 with three home runs, six RBIs, and eight runs scored over six games. He became the first NL player to win consecutive Player of the Week Awards since Bryce Harper in May 2015. It was Martinez's fourth weekly honor of 2017, making him the first player with four in the same season since the award was created in 1974. He hit his 16th home run of September on September 28, tying Ralph Kiner in 1949 for the National League record for the month. Martinez was named NL Player of the Month for September, playing 24 games and hitting 16 home runs, .404 (40-for-99), eight doubles, 24 runs scored, and 36 RBIs.

In 62 games with Arizona, Martinez hit .302 with 29 home runs and 65 RBIs. His combined achievements with Detroit and Arizona in 2017 included a .303 batting average in 119 games played and new career-highs in each of 45 home runs, 104 RBIs, .376 OBP, and eight intentional walks. Other career highs of .690 slugging percentage and 9.6 at bats per home run also led the major leagues, albeit without gaining the requisite number of plate appearances to qualify for rate statistic titles in either of the American or National Leagues. He was second in the major leagues in OPS (1.066), third in home runs, fourth in OPS+ (166), and sixth in adjusted batting runs (41). After the season, Martinez became a free agent for the first time of his career.

Since joining the Tigers in 2014 until the end of the 2017 season, Martínez hit the 10th-most home runs in baseball while taking the second-fewest plate appearances of the top 20 home runs hitters. His slugging percentage trailed only Mike Trout, and he ranked in the top five in wOBA and wRC+ while batting .300 and .362 OBP. His .690 slugging percentage in 2017 led all MLB hitters by 59 points before adding hitless plate appearances to qualify. In terms of quality of contact, Martinez led MLB with a 49% hard contact rate, and only Aaron Judge managed more barrels per plate appearance. Martinez ranked tenth with a 208-foot (63 m) average batted ball distance counting hitters who produced 250 or more batted ball events. He ranked 12th with a 90.8 miles per hour (146.1 km/h) average exit velocity, and sixth in fly balls with an average exit velocity of 97.2 miles per hour (156.4 km/h).

=== Boston Red Sox ===
==== 2018 ====
On February 26, 2018, Martinez signed a five-year, $110 million contract with the Boston Red Sox. On April 7, Martinez hit his first home run in a Red Sox uniform at Fenway Park, doing so off Chaz Roe of the Tampa Bay Rays. Martinez won the AL Player of the Week Award for the week ending on May 20, after hitting five home runs, eight RBIs, a .346 average, and 1.414 OPS in seven games. At that point, he had tied with teammate Mookie Betts for the major league home run lead at 15, making them the first duo in Red Sox history to both hit at least 15 home runs within the first 50 games of the season. Martinez set the franchise record for home runs through June, hitting his 25th on June 28 versus Andrew Heaney of the Los Angeles Angels. The previous record of 24 had been achieved by Ted Williams (1950), Mo Vaughn (1996), Jose Canseco (1996) and Manny Ramirez (2001).

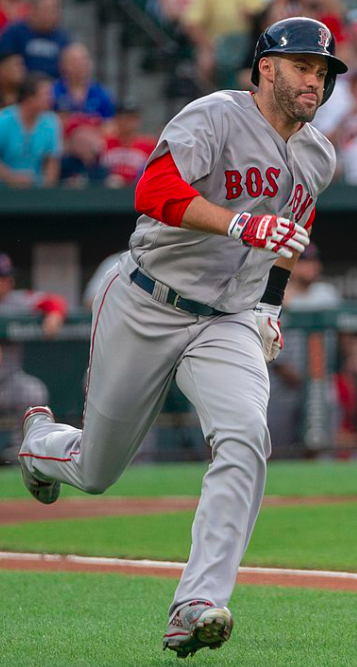
Martinez with the Red Sox in 2018

Batting .329 with 27 home runs and 73 RBIs, Martinez was named to the 2018 MLB All-Star Game as the American League's starting designated hitter. Spanning one full season of play from the 2017 MLB All-Star Game to July 14, 2018, he led the major leagues in home runs (60), RBIs (152), and OPS (1.074). In a 19–12 win over the Baltimore Orioles on August 10, Martinez became the first player to reach 100 RBIs in the 2018 MLB season. Martinez again won the AL Player of the Week Award, for the week ending August 12, when he hit .464 with 11 RBIs and nine extra-base hits. He was also recognized as the AL Player of the Month for August, with a slash line of .373/.453/.686 with seven home runs and 25 RBIs in 26 games.

Martinez finished the 2018 season with 43 home runs and a career-high 130 RBIs, which led MLB. He also led the Red Sox in home runs and hits. In Game 1 of the ALDS, Martinez hit a three-run home run in the first inning off New York starter J. A. Happ; Boston won the game 5–4. In Game 5 of the ALCS, Martinez hit a solo home run versus Houston starter Justin Verlander; Boston won the game, 4–1, to clinch a World Series berth and face the Los Angeles Dodgers. In Game 5 of the World Series, Martinez homered in the seventh inning to increase the Red Sox lead to 4–1. The Red Sox went on to win the game, capturing their ninth World Series title. In the 2018 postseason, Martinez batted .300/.403/.520 with three home runs and 14 RBIs, tallying one home run in each of Boston's three playoff series.

On October 26, Martinez was announced as the American League recipient of the annual Hank Aaron Award. He won two Silver Slugger Awards, one as an outfielder and one as a designated hitter, becoming the first player to win more than one in the same season. He was also named the Players Choice Award winner for 2018 Player of the Year.

==== 2019 ====
While visiting the Seattle Mariners on March 31, 2019, Martinez homered for his 1,000th career hit, walked twice and collected four RBIs. In a road game versus the Baltimore Orioles on May 7, he hit his 200th career home run. At the end of June, he had a .298 average with 18 home runs and 47 RBIs. Martinez was selected as a reserve designated hitter to the 2019 All-Star Game. For the season, Martinez batted .304 with 36 home runs and 105 RBIs. He had the highest batting average against left-handers of all major league batters with 100 or more at bats against them (.404). He had the lowest Soft Contact Percentage of all American League batters, at 10.2%.

When asked about exercising his opt-out clause following the club's final regular season game, Martinez responded, "I don't mind moving around. I kind of like it." However, on November 4, his agent Scott Boras announced that Martinez would not be exercising his opt-out and would remain with Boston. Forbes magazine ranked Martinez as the world's 94th highest-paid athlete in 2019, totaling $25.6 million ($32.2 million today) in projected earnings.

==== 2020 ====
During the pandemic-shortened 2020 season, Martinez was again Boston's primary designated hitter. He struggled at the plate, falling below the Mendoza Line (.200) on September 18. Overall with the 2020 Red Sox, he batted .213 with seven home runs and 27 RBIs in 54 games.

==== 2021 ====
Martinez returned in 2021 as Boston's primary designated hitter, starting the season batting 13-for-30 (.433) in Boston's first seven games. On April 10, he was briefly on the COVID-related list, missing one game. On April 11, Martinez recorded his third career game with three home runs, driving in four runs in a 14–9 win over the Baltimore Orioles. He became the fifth player in history to hit three home runs in one game for three different teams after Johnny Mize, Dave Kingman, Alex Rodriguez, and Mark Teixeira. He also became the second player in the modern era to record 12 extra-base hits in the first eight games of the regular season, the first being Dante Bichette in 1994. Martinez was subsequently named AL Player of the Week for the week of April 5–11. On July 4, he was named to the American League roster for the MLB All-Star Game. Martinez was placed on the COVID-related injured list on August 7, and returned to the lineup the next day. Overall with Boston during the regular season, Martinez played in 148 games while batting .286 with 28 home runs and 99 RBIs. After missing the Wild Card Game due to an ankle injury he suffered in the final game of the regular season, Martinez played in nine playoff games, batting 11-for-32 (.344), as the Red Sox advanced to the ALCS. During Game 2 of the ALCS, both Martinez and Rafael Devers hit grand slams, marking the first time an MLB team had two grand slams in a playoff game. On November 7, Martinez declined his opt-out clause for the third straight year, choosing to remain with the Red Sox for the 2022 season.

==== 2022 ====
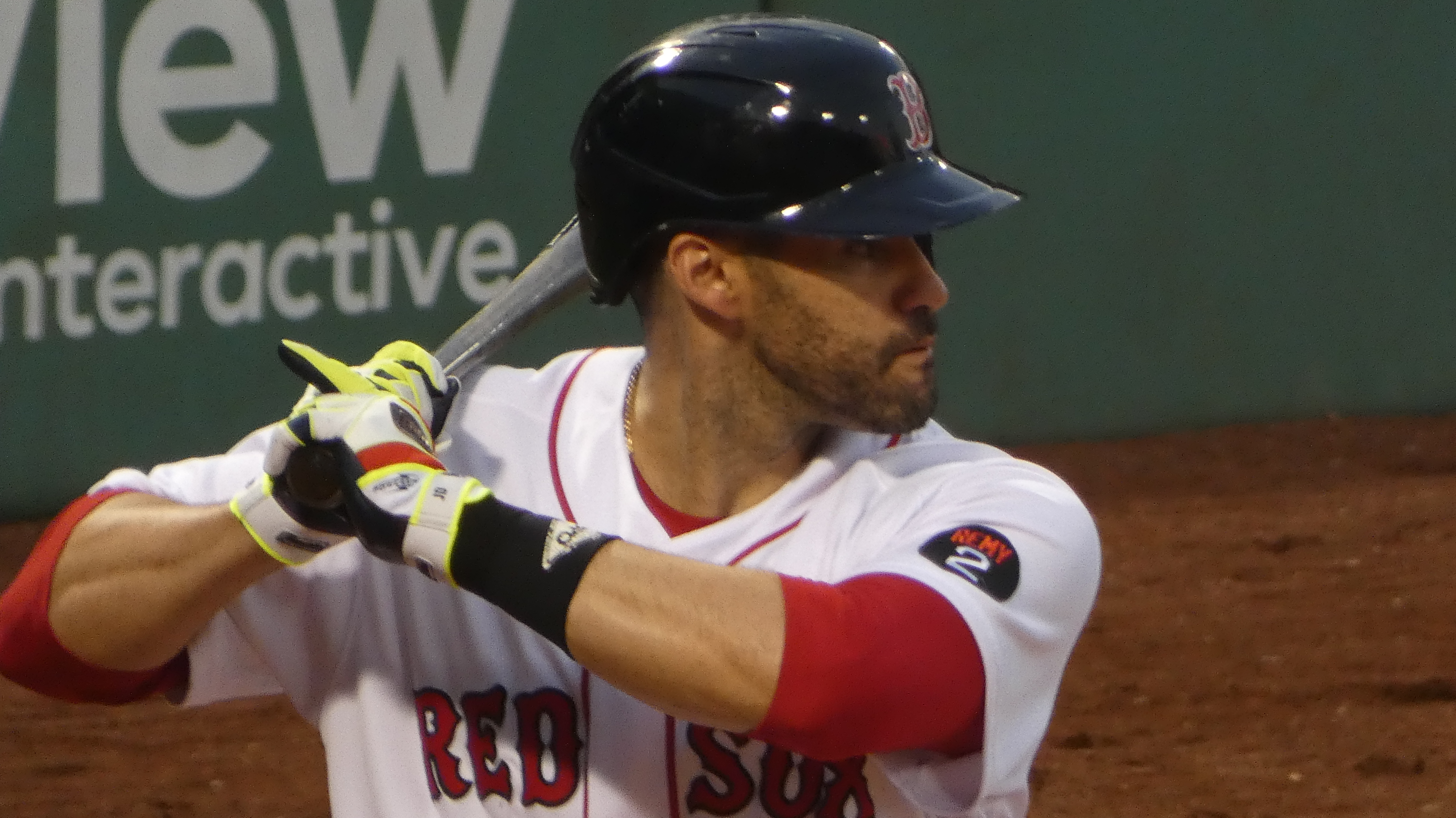
Martinez batting at Fenway Park in August 2022

Martinez returned for the 2022 season as Boston's primary DH. At the end of May, his .360 average was leading MLB. On July 12, Martinez was named to the roster of the All-Star Game, replacing Yordan Alvarez due to injury. For the final week of the regular season, Martinez earned his 10th MLB Player of the Week Award, having gone 12-for-34 (.353) with four home runs in nine games. Overall for the 2022 season, Martinez batted .274 with 16 home runs and 62 RBIs in 139 games, all as DH. He hit 43 doubles, a career-high, which placed second in the AL.

Following the 2022 season, Martinez became a free agent.

=== Los Angeles Dodgers ===
On December 29, 2022, Martinez signed a one-year, $10 million contract with the Los Angeles Dodgers.

On June 27, 2023, Martinez hit his 300th career home run off Brad Hand of the Colorado Rockies. On September 29, he collected his 1,000th career RBI against the San Francisco Giants. He played in 113 games, hitting .271 with 33 home runs and 103 RBI. He became a free agent following the season.

=== New York Mets ===
On March 23, 2024, Martinez signed a one-year, $12 million contract with the New York Mets. He later consented to be optioned to the Triple–A Syracuse Mets to begin the year in order to prepare for major–league game action. On April 26, the Mets promoted Martinez back up to the major leagues. On June 13, in a game against the Miami Marlins, Martinez hit his first career walk-off home run off of pitcher Tanner Scott. He then won NL Player of the Week Honors on June 17. Martinez played in 120 games for the Mets in 2024, batting .235/.320/.406 with 16 home runs and 69 RBI.

== Post-playing career ==
On March 31, 2026, the New York Mets hired Martinez to serve as a special advisor within the team's baseball operations department.

== Personal life ==
Martinez grew up in South Florida, the son of a Cuban immigrant, and is a fluent Spanish speaker. He resides in Fort Lauderdale, Florida, during the offseason.

In 2013, Martinez posted on Instagram an image of Adolf Hitler doing a Nazi salute with the text "To conquer a Nation, First disarm it's [sic] citizens," a quote misattributed to Hitler, and the caption "This is why I always stay strapped! #thetruth." The post reemerged in August 2018 and generated controversy. Martinez told reporters "I stand by the Constitution and the Second Amendment. It's something that I take pride in, and it's something that I'll back up."

== Awards and achievements ==
=== Awards received ===
- New York–Penn League All-Star (2009)
- South Atlantic League Most Valuable Player (2010)
- Houston Astros Minor League Player of the Year (2010)
- Texas League All-Star (2011)
- NSU Sharks Hall of Fame inductee (2014)
- Detroit Tiger of the Year (2015)
- Hank Aaron Award (2018)

=== Statistical leader ===
- At bats per home run—MLB (2017, 9.6)
- Doubles—MLB (2021, 42)
- Runs batted in (RBI)—MLB (2018, 130)
- Slugging percentage—MLB (2017, .690)
- Total bases—MLB (2018, 358)
- 6× MLB All-Star (2015, 2018, 2019, 2021–2023)
- Players Choice Award for Player of the Year (2018)
- 3× Silver Slugger Award (2015, 2018, 2018)
- 2× MLB Player of the Month:
  - September 2017 (NL)
  - August 2018 (AL)
- 12× MLB Player of the Week:
  - June 22, 2014 (AL)
  - July 5, 2015 (AL)
  - May 21, 2017 (AL)
  - July 16, 2017 (AL)
  - September 10, 2017 (NL)
  - September 17, 2017 (NL)
  - May 20, 2018 (AL)
  - August 12, 2018 (AL)
  - April 11, 2021 (AL)
  - October 2, 2022 (AL)
  - September 24, 2023 (NL)
  - June 17, 2023 (NL)

== See also ==
- Detroit Tigers award winners and league leaders
- List of Boston Red Sox award winners
- List of Cuban Americans
- List of Major League Baseball annual doubles leaders
- List of Major League Baseball career slugging percentage leaders
- List of Major League Baseball career home run leaders
- List of Major League Baseball career runs batted in leaders
- List of Major League Baseball single-game home run leaders
- List of Major League Baseball single-game records
- List of Nova Southeastern University alumni
- List of people from Miami

Awards and achievements
Preceded by Scooter Gennett	Batters with four home runs in one game September 4, 2017	Succeeded by Eugenio Suárez
Preceded by Giancarlo Stanton; José Ramírez	Major League Baseball Player of the Month; September 2017 (NL); August 2018 (AL)	Succeeded by A. J. Pollock; Mike Trout
Preceded by Jose Altuve	Players Choice Award for Player of the Year; 2018	Succeeded by Mike Trout
