= Miles Mikolas =

American baseball player (born 1988)

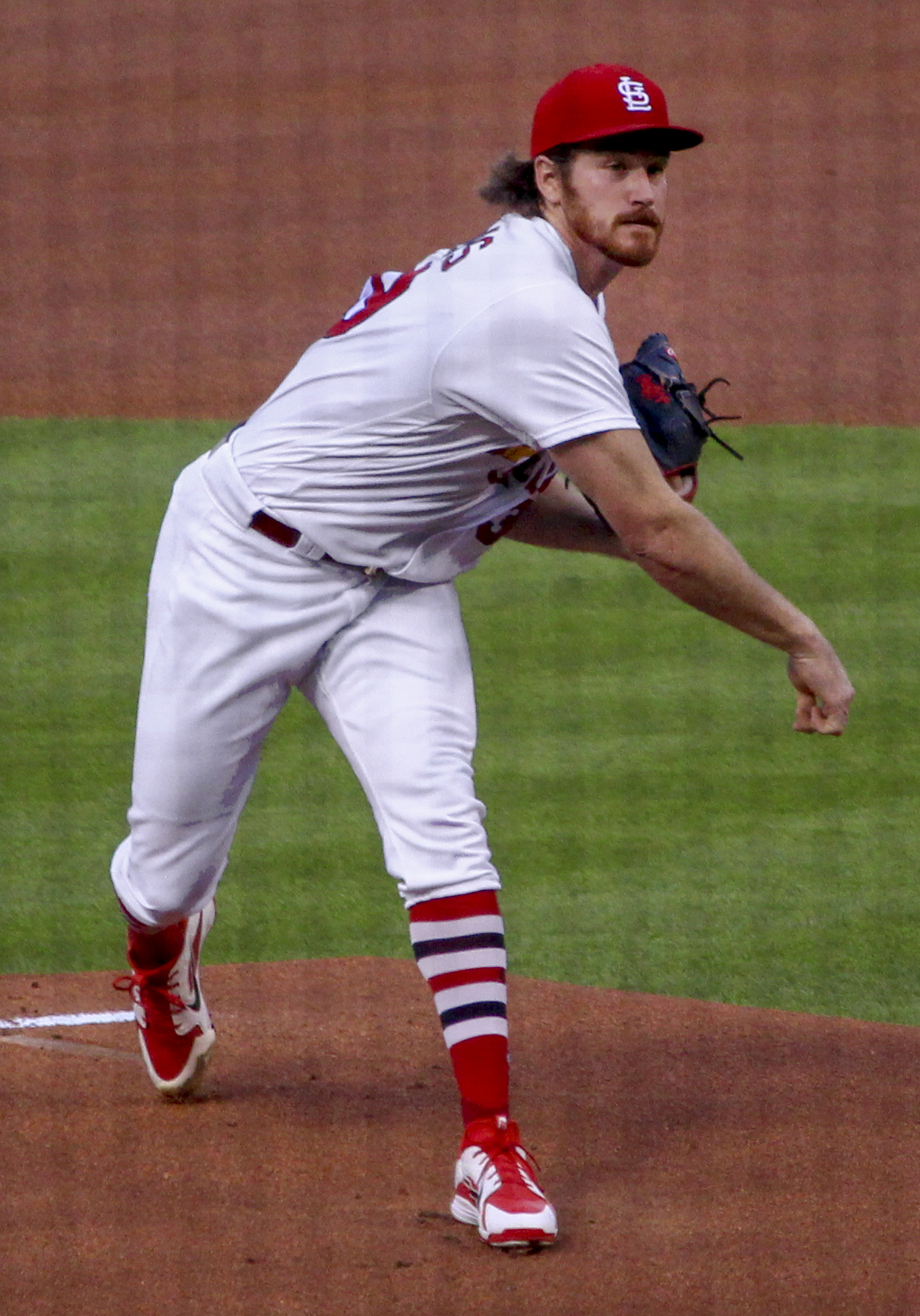
- Mikolas with the St. Louis Cardinals in 2018

Free agent
- Pitcher
- Born: August 23, 1988 (age 38); Jupiter, Florida, U.S.
- Bats: Right Throws: Right

Professional debut
- MLB: May 5, 2012, for the San Diego Padres
- NPB: April 8, 2015, for the Yomiuri Giants

MLB statistics (through August 11, 2026)
- Win–loss record: 75–84
- Earned run average: 4.37
- Strikeouts: 953

NPB statistics (through 2017 season)
- Win–loss record: 31–13
- Earned run average: 2.18
- Strikeouts: 378
- Stats at Baseball Reference

Teams
- San Diego Padres (2012–2013); Texas Rangers (2014); Yomiuri Giants (2015–2017); St. Louis Cardinals (2018–2019, 2021–2025); Washington Nationals (2026)

Career highlights and awards
- 2× All-Star (2018, 2022); NL wins co-leader (2018 (Note: Tied with Jon Lester and Max Scherzer.))
Medals
Men's baseball
Representing United States
World Baseball Classic
Silver medal – second place	2023 Miami	Team

Miles Tice Mikolas (/ˈmaɪkoʊlɑːs/ MY-koh-lahs; born August 23, 1988) is an American professional baseball pitcher who is a free agent. He has previously played in Major League Baseball (MLB) for the San Diego Padres, Texas Rangers, St. Louis Cardinals, and Washington Nationals, and in Nippon Professional Baseball (NPB) for the Yomiuri Giants. He was an All-Star in 2018, tied with Jon Lester and Max Scherzer for the lead in the National League in wins that season, and finished sixth in NL Cy Young Award voting that year. He was also an All-Star in 2022.

== Amateur career ==
Mikolas pitched for Jupiter Community High School in Palm Beach County, Florida, from which he graduated in 2006. He then attended Nova Southeastern University and played college baseball for the Nova Southeastern Sharks. In 2009, his junior year, he went 7–2 with a 2.06 ERA in 11 starts.

== Professional career ==
=== San Diego Padres ===
The San Diego Padres selected Mikolas in the seventh round of the 2009 Major League Baseball draft.

Mikolas pitched as a reliever for the Class-A Fort Wayne TinCaps in 2010, and was 6–3 with 13 saves (2nd in the Midwest League) and posted a 2.20 earned run average (ERA) in 60 games (leading the league). He was named a Midwest League All Star.

He began 2011 with the High-A Lake Elsinore Storm and, after going 3–0 with 12 saves (4th in the California League) and a 1.13 ERA in 34 games, was promoted to the Double-A San Antonio Missions on July 4. Mikolas finished out 2011 by going 1–0 with nine saves and compiling a 1.67 ERA as a reliever for the Missions over 28 games.

Mikolas received a non-roster invitation to spring training in 2012. He was assigned to the minor league camp later in the spring, and started the year with San Antonio. Mikolas was called up to the majors for the first time directly from Double-A San Antonio on May 5, 2012. He made his debut at Petco Park against the Miami Marlins, for whom he grew up rooting. The first batter he faced, Giancarlo Stanton, hit a home run. Mikolas was sent down to the Triple-A Tucson Padres on June 5, after making 13 appearances and allowing five earned runs in 13 2/3 innings. He was recalled on July 5, and made two more appearances before being optioned back to Triple-A. He was recalled from Tucson again on August 5, and stayed with the big league club through the rest of the year. For the season, Mikolas was 2–1 and amassed a 3.62 ERA and 23 strikeouts versus 15 walks over 32 1/3 innings.

In 2013 with Tucson, he was 4–2 with a 3.25 ERA, and 26 saves (3rd in the Pacific Coast League). He pitched 1 2/3 scoreless innings for the Padres. Mikolas was designated for assignment by the Padres on November 20, 2013.

=== Texas Rangers ===
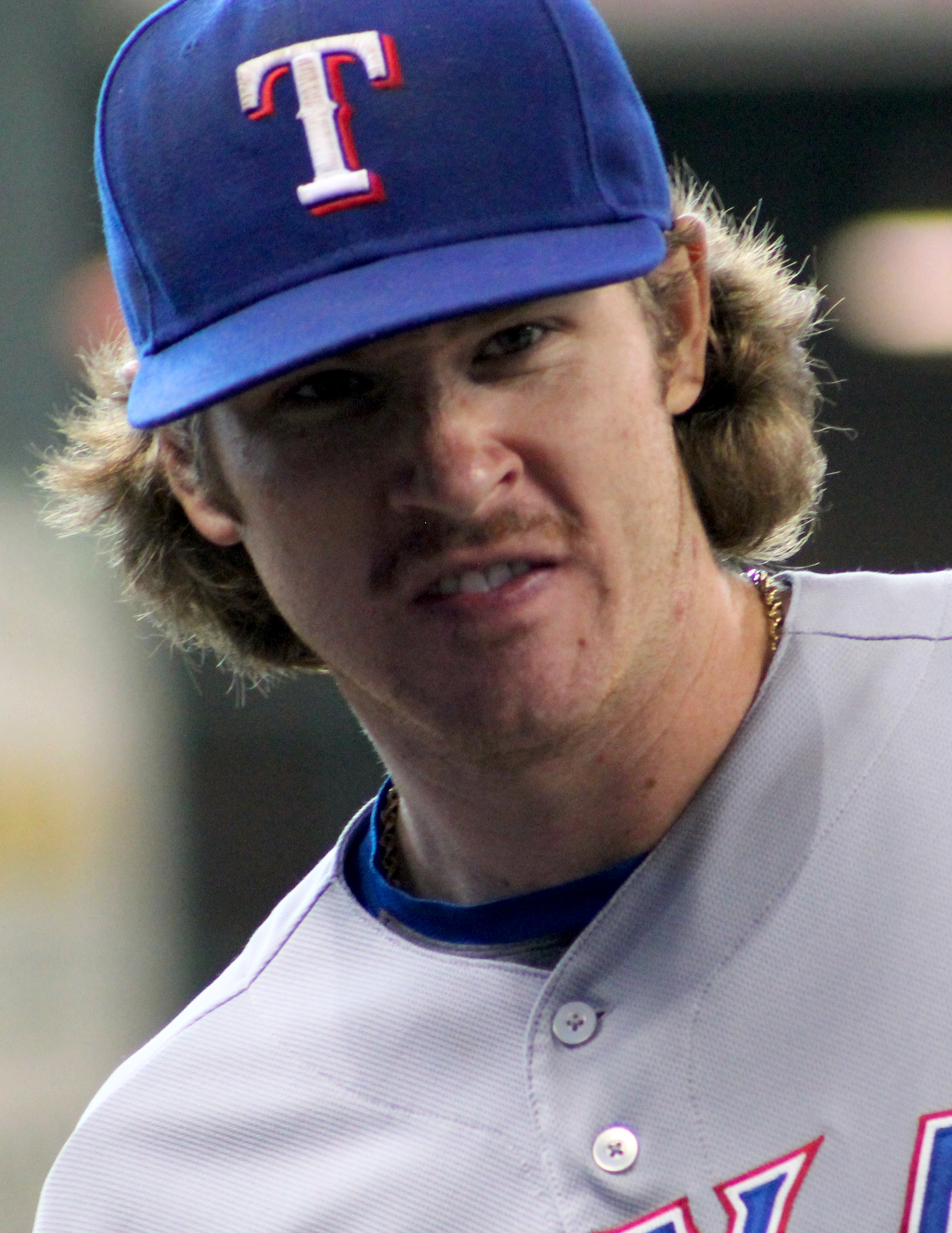
Mikolas with the Rangers in 2014

The Padres traded Mikolas to the Pittsburgh Pirates, along with Jaff Decker, for Alex Dickerson after the 2013 season. During that offseason, the Pirates traded him to the Texas Rangers in exchange for Chris McGuiness. He began the 2014 season with the Round Rock Express.

Mikolas was called up to the Rangers' 25-man roster on July 1, 2014. In 44 2/3 innings pitched prior to his promotion, he had a 5–1 win–loss record with a 3.22 ERA. Mikolas started his first career game against the Baltimore Orioles, giving up three hits and three runs in 5 1/3 innings. He spent the remainder of the season with Texas, going 2–5 with a 6.44 ERA in ten starts. The Rangers released Mikolas after the 2014 season.

=== Yomiuri Giants ===
On November 25, 2014, Mikolas signed a one-year, US$700,000 deal with the Yomiuri Giants of Nippon Professional Baseball for the 2015 season. In 2015, he was 13–3. After the season, the Giants re-signed him to a two-year deal. In three seasons for Yomiuri, he pitched to a 31–13 record with a 2.18 ERA in 62 starts.

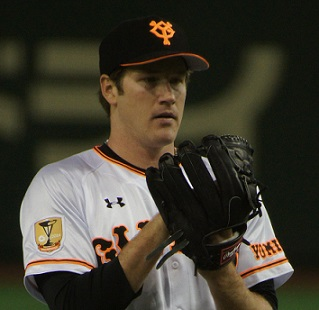
Mikolas pitching for the Yomiuri Giants

=== St. Louis Cardinals ===
Mikolas signed a two-year, $15.5 million contract with the St. Louis Cardinals on December 5, 2017. He won his debut with the Cardinals 8–4 on April 2, 2018, at Miller Park against the Milwaukee Brewers. While batting, he hit a two-run home run versus Zach Davies for his first major league hit. On the mound, he completed 5 2/3 innings, allowing three home runs and four runs total, while striking out five and walking none.

Mikolas threw his first major league complete game, a shutout, on May 21, 2018, at Busch Stadium against the Kansas City Royals. He struck out nine, walked one, and gave up only four hits as the Cardinals defeated Kansas City 6–0. Owning a 9–3 record, a 2.63 ERA, and a 1.03 WHIP, Mikolas was named to the 2018 Major League Baseball All-Star Game, his first All-Star selection.

Mikolas finished his 2018 campaign with an 18–4 record (including a 10–0 record on the road), a league-leading .818 won-loss percentage, a 2.83 ERA (4th in the National League), 1.071 WHIP (5th), walking just 29 batters in 200 2/3 innings (6th), in 32 starts (9th). His 18 wins tied with Jon Lester and Max Scherzer for the NL lead. He led the majors with only 1.30 BB/9, and also led all major league pitchers in first-strike percentage (70.8%). In addition, he had the highest zone percentage of all major league pitchers, with 48.0% of his pitches being in the strike zone. On defense, he was second among NL pitchers in range factor per 9 innings (2.20), third in putouts (19), and fourth in assists (30). He came in sixth in the voting for the 2018 NL Cy Young Award.

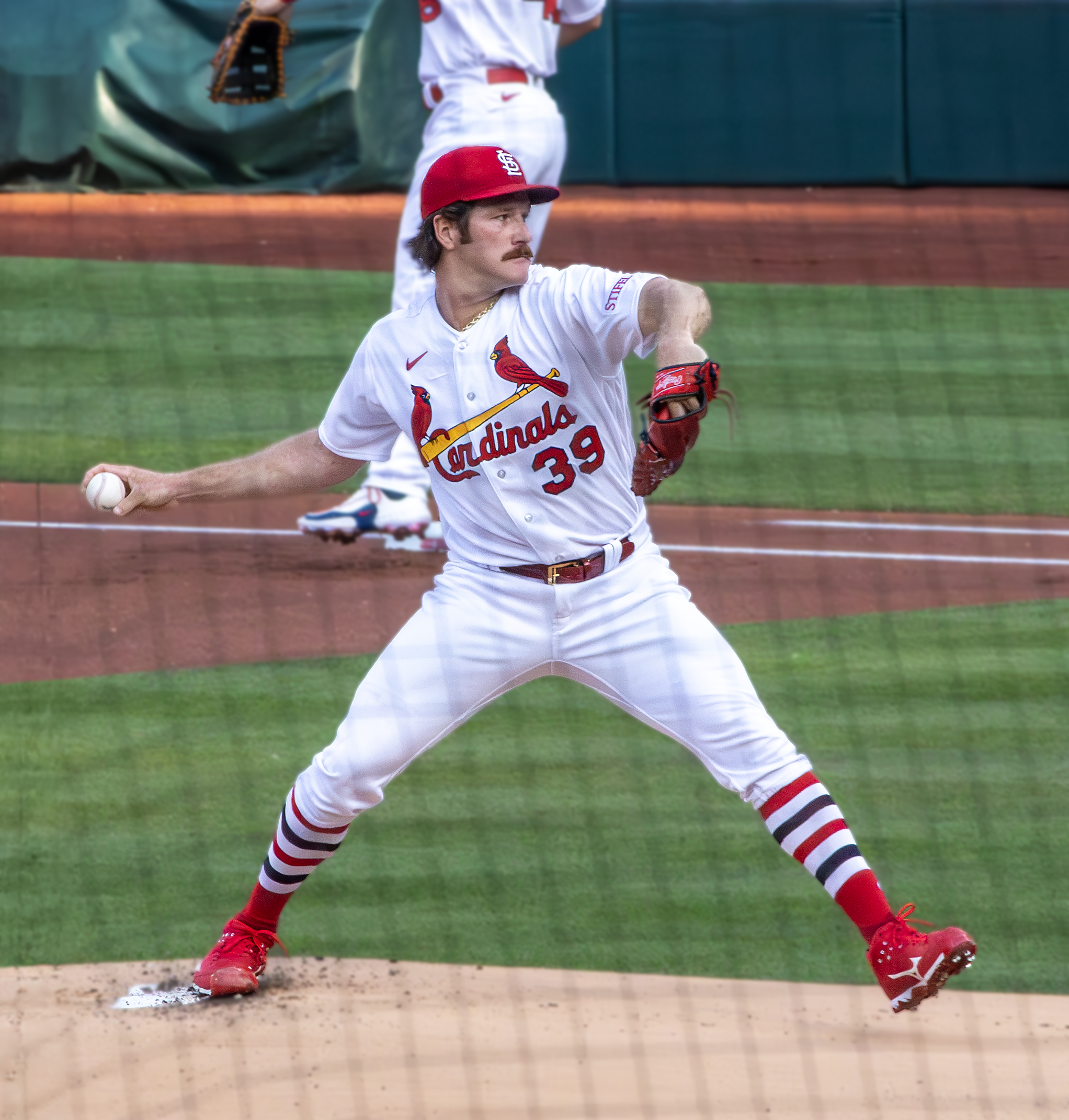
Miles Mikolas of the St.Louis Cardinals 2023.

On February 26, 2019, Mikolas and the Cardinals agreed on a four-year extension worth $68 million. He finished the 2019 regular season with a 9–14 record and a 4.16 ERA, striking out 144 over 184 innings. He was named St. Louis' Game 1 starter for the 2019 National League Division Series. He missed the entire 2020 season due to undergoing surgery to repair a flexor tendon in his right arm.

On August 20, 2021, Mikolas was activated off of the 60-day injured list after missing the past 75 games with a right forearm strain.

Mikolas threw 8 2/3 no-hit innings in a game on June 14, 2022, against the Pittsburgh Pirates. With two strikes in the count to the next batter, Cal Mitchell, Mikolas allowed a ground-rule double. Mikolas was named to the 2022 Major League Baseball All-Star Game after replacing Corbin Burnes.

On March 24, 2023, Mikolas agreed to a two-year, $40 million contract extension with the Cardinals. Despite a regression in his performance, Mikolas became the first pitcher to start 35 games in a season since Jhoulys Chacín in 2018. He finished the season with a 4.78 ERA and only walked 39 hitters in 201 1/3 innings.

Mikolas made 32 starts for St. Louis during the 2024 campaign, compiling a 10–11 record and 5.35 ERA with 122 strikeouts across 171 2/3 innings pitched. 2025 represented more struggles for Mikolas, who pitched to an 8–11 record and 4.84 ERA with 100 strikeouts, but he again did not miss a start, starting in 31 games and pitching 156 1/3 innings.

=== Washington Nationals ===
On February 11, 2026, Mikolas signed a one-year, $2.25 million contract with the Washington Nationals. He made 25 appearances (including 11 starts) for Washington, compiling a 3–9 record and 5.82 ERA with 58 strikeouts over 116 innings of work. On August 12, Mikolas was designated for assignment by the Nationals following the promotion of Jackson Kent. He was released by Washington two days later.

== Personal life ==
Mikolas is married to Lauren Mikolas, who was an elementary school teacher, UFC ring girl, and certified wellness coach who became a social media celebrity in Japan with her lifestyle blog. Their first child, a daughter, was born in March 2017, and his wife gave birth to twins, a son and a daughter, in July 2018.

Mikolas got the nickname "Lizard King" when, on a bet, he ate a lizard in the bullpen during a 2011 Arizona Fall League game. The video was posted to YouTube.

== See also ==
- List of Nova Southeastern University alumni
- St. Louis Cardinals award winners and league leaders
