= Bernard Ardisana =

U.S. military intelligence officer

- Born: October 27, 1924; Tampa, Florida, U.S.
- Died: January 14, 1978 (aged 53)
- Education: University of Illinois Urbana-Champaign (BSc); Our Lady of the Lake University (MA); Air Command and Staff College; Air War College
- Occupation: Assistant Deputy Director for Operations for the NSA

Brigadier General Bernard Ardisana (October 27, 1924 – January 14, 1978) was the assistant deputy director for operations at the National Security Agency at Fort George G. Meade. During his tenure with the US Military he also commanded the USAF Security Service's 6924th Security Squadron and went on to become the Vice Commander of the USAF Security Service. He died on January 14, 1978, from a heart attack at Kimbrough Army Hospital at Ft. Meade.

== Early life and schooling ==
Bernard Ardisana was born on October 27, 1924, in Tampa, Florida. Immediately after completing high school in 1943, he enlisted in the U.S. Army Signal Corps where he took up the position of radio engineer. He only stayed in the military for three years before returning to civilian life and attending the University of Illinois Urbana-Champaign, where he graduated in 1949 with a Bachelor of Science degree in economics. While at the University of Illinois, he participated in the Reserve Officers' Training Corps and was commissioned a second lieutenant upon graduation. In 1966, as an officer in the Air Force Reserve, he earned his Master of Arts degree in education from Our Lady of the Lake University in San Antonio, Texas. Between April and September 1961, Ardisana attended and then graduated from the Air Command and Staff College at Maxwell Air Force Base. In 1972, he attended the Air War College at Maxwell Air Force Base and graduated in 1973.

== Career ==
Ardisana worked for several U.S. military agencies including the Air Force, the NSA, and the Army Signal Corps. In March 1952 he was called to active duty to train at the Brooks Air Force Base as a student in traffic-analysis.

Upon completion of his training in August he was transferred to Washington, DC to work as a language officer for the Armed Forces Security Agency. In 1956 he was transferred to Fort Meade where he developed new analysis techniques that are still in use today. In 1958 he was transferred to Zweibrücken, Germany, where he developed an operations communications system still used by the cryptography community today. Between 1963 and 1965 he served as chief of the Operations Inspection team at Kelly Air Force Base, San Antonio, Texas.

In 1966 he became head of the Operations Systems Evaluation and Management Branch at the U.S. Air Force Security Service Directorate of Operations. Between 1967 and 1970 he served in Vietnam as the under various positions before being sent to Frankfurt, Germany to act as assistant deputy chief of staff for operations for the European Security Region. He returned to the United States in 1972.

In 1973 he was assigned to Ft. Meade to serve as part of the National Security Agency. He stayed there for two years before becoming Vice commander of the U.S. Air Force Security Service. He retained that position for two years as well before returning to the NSA as their Assistant Deputy Director for Operations.

== Death ==
Ardisana died on January 14, 1978, at Kimbrough Army Hospital at Ft. Meade from a heart attack while serving as the NSA's Assistant Deputy Director for Operations.

== Legacy ==
Ardisana's expertise in cryptography allowed him to develop a number of important changes to USAF cryptologic operations and procedures. Much of his work in designing the Operations Communications remained the standard for 25 years within the US Air Force. His work was a "key concept" that allowed the development of the Critical Intelligence Communication System.
