= Our Lady of the Lake University =

Private university in San Antonio, Texas, US

- Former names: Academy of Our Lady of the Lake (1895‍–‍1911); Our Lady of the Lake College (1911‍–‍1975); Our Lady of the Lake University of San Antonio (1976‍–‍1986)
- Type: Private university
- Established: 1895; 131 years ago
- Accreditation: SACS
- Religious affiliation: Catholic Church (Congregation of Divine Providence)
- Academic affiliations: ACCU; CIC; NAICU
- Endowment: $30.1 million
- President: Abel A. Chávez
- Provost: Alan Silva
- Students: 2,096
- Undergraduates: 1,147
- Postgraduates: 949
- Location: San Antonio, Texas, United States; 29.4263°N 98.5444°W
- Campus: 72 acres (0.29 km^{2}); Large city
- Other campuses: Houston; La Feria
- Colors: Blue and white
- Nickname: Saints
- Sporting affiliations: NAIA – RRAC
- Website: www.ollusa.edu
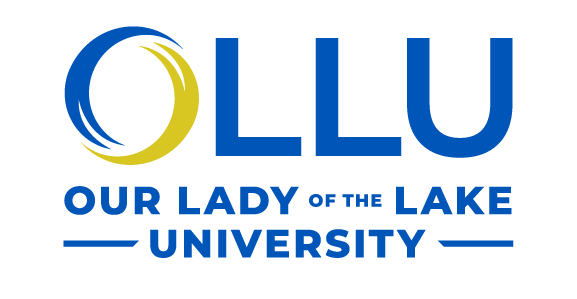

Our Lady of the Lake University (OLLU), known locally as the Lake, is a private Catholic university in San Antonio, Texas, United States. It was founded in 1895 by the Sisters of Divine Providence, a religious institute originating in Lorraine, France, during the 18th century. The Texas chapter of the institute still sponsors the university. Our Lady of the Lake University was the first San Antonio institution of higher education to receive regional accreditation and its Worden School of Social Service is the oldest Social Work school in Texas.

Our Lady of the Lake University offers bachelor's degrees, master's degrees, and three doctoral degree programs across its main campus and its satellite campuses in The Woodlands and in the Rio Grande Valley. The university's athletic teams, the Saints, compete in the Red River Athletic Conference (RRAC) as part of the National Association of Intercollegiate Athletics (NAIA).

== History ==
In 1895, construction began on the main campus of what would become Our Lady of the Lake College. By 1896, high school educational programs were underway. The first college program began in 1911 as a two-year curriculum for women. In 1919, the curriculum was expanded to four years and the institution was admitted to membership in the Texas Association of Colleges. Graduate study began in 1942 and was coeducational from its inception; all programs became fully coeducational in 1969. In 1975, the name of the institution was changed from Our Lady of the Lake College to Our Lady of the Lake University of San Antonio.

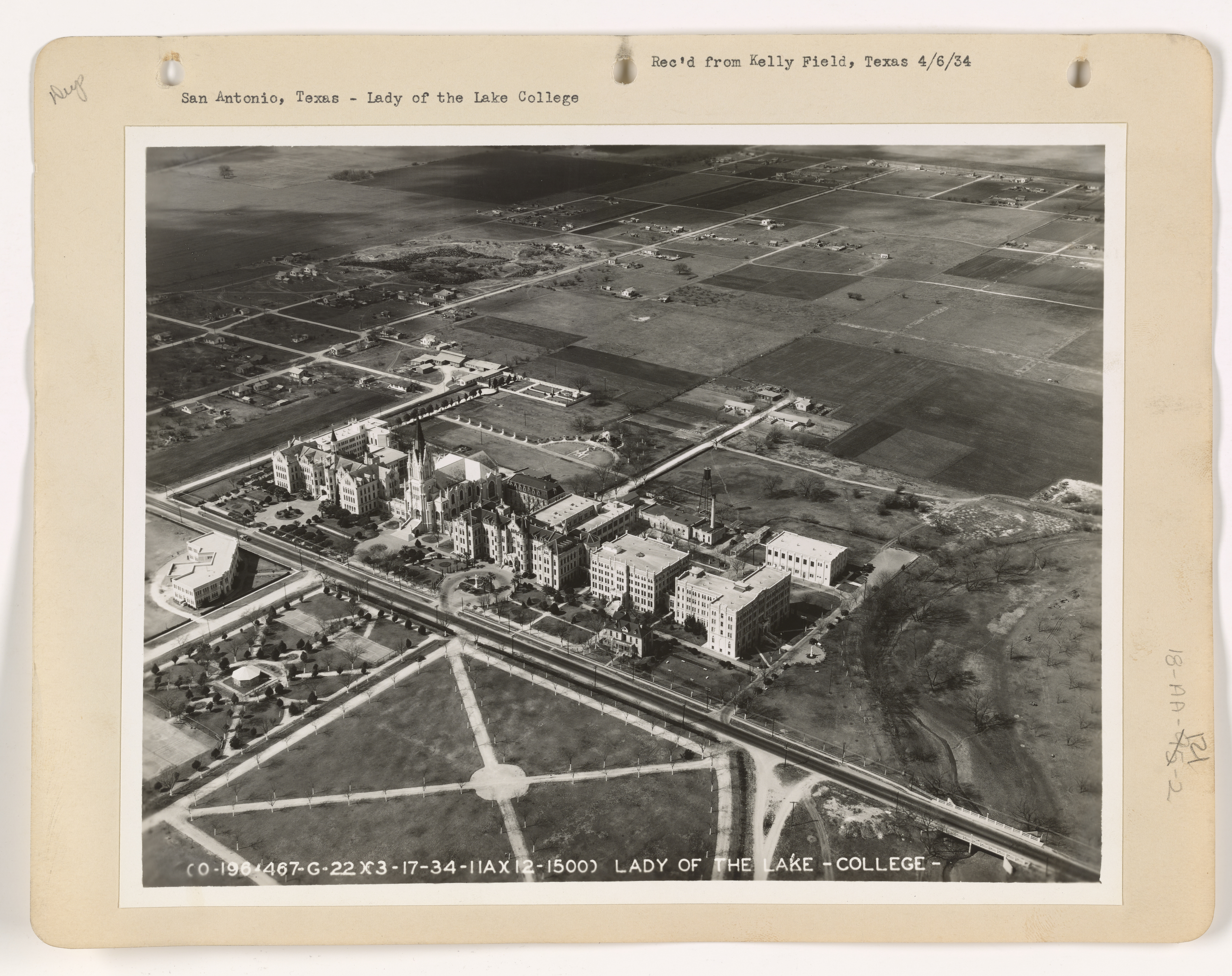
Aerial view of the campus in 1934

Our Lady of the Lake University was the first San Antonio institution of higher education to receive regional accreditation. It has been accredited by the Commission on Colleges of the Southern Association of Colleges and Schools since 1923. In 1927, it became the third Texas school to be approved by the American Association of Universities.

As part of its mission to provide education to those with limited access, the university introduced the Weekend College concept at the San Antonio campus in 1978. OLLU began offering "weekend degree" programs at Lone Star College–North Harris in 1986. The Houston program would move to the Lone Star College–University Center in 2012, and construction would be completed on its stand-alone campus, located off Beltway 8 near Interstate 45, in 2018. Beginning July 2026, OLLU would vacate its stand-alone Houston campus and relocate back to the Lone Star College–University Center.

In 2008, the university began a partnership with school districts in the Rio Grande Valley that would eventually evolve into its satellite campus in La Feria, Texas.

University president Tessa Martinez Pollack resigned on March 1, 2013. She began her presidency in 2002. Her resignation followed what the San Antonio Express-News characterized as "months of tumult in which students and faculty protested Pollack's decision to eliminate a dozen degree majors, including religious studies and Mexican-American studies, which some considered at the core of the Catholic school's mission and identity." Jane Ann Slater served as interim president until Diane Melby was appointed to the post in July 2015.

On May 27, 2021, Melby announced her intention to retire after the 2021–22 school year in an open letter to the OLLU community. A search committee for her successor was formed, and Abel A. Chávez was chosen as the university's 10th president. Chávez began his tenure in July 2022.

=== 2008 fire ===
On May 6, 2008, a fire was reported on the campus at 7:44 p.m. CDT. The fire affected all four floors of the main building. The fire quickly changed from a three- to four-alarm fire after an hour with five pumper trucks battling the blaze. No injuries or deaths occurred. The fire consumed the roof and one spire had collapsed. Much of the damage to the building was due to the amount of water poured into the building to contain the blaze. While the firefighters struggled with the fourth floor, some of the university's IT staff went in and protected the servers that were located on the first floor of the same building. Operations were coordinated from the Library building located across 24th Street from Main. A bomb threat the day before the fire had caused some concern that the incident was arson-related. Firefighters suspect that the fire started on the fourth floor of the Main building due to an electrical short. The community quickly rallied to raise funds for reconstruction, and the project was completed in fall 2010. It hosted its first class since the fire in January 2011.

== Academics ==
As of 2026, Our Lady of the Lake University offers Bachelor's degrees in 24 areas of study, Master's degrees in 16 areas of study, and three doctoral degree programs. In the fall of 2025 OLLU would start the process of cutting underperforming programs and closing enrollment for affected majors. Some majors impacted include Biomathematics, Chemistry, English, History, Comparative Mexican American Studies, Sociology, Spanish, Theology, and Leadership Studies, Classes are offered through traditional weekday, weekend and online formats. The university also offers classes on its satellite campuses in The Woodlands, near Houston, and in the Rio Grande Valley in La Feria, Texas.

== Campus ==
The university's historic Main Building was completed in 1895. Today, it is home to the university cafeteria, several classrooms and offices, and the Veronica Salazar Media Center.

Sacred Heart Conventual Chapel, completed in 1923, was designed by architect Leo M. J. Dielmann.

The University Wellness and Activities Center (UWAC) and adjacent athletic fields are home to the university's athletic teams, as well as exercise facilities for student use.

The university has four residence halls. Three of these (Ayres, Pacelli, Centennial, and Flores) are traditional dorm-style housing, with the Slater Apartments formerly known as Lake-View Apartments providing apartment-style housing.

Students are served by the VIA Metropolitan Transit system for free with student IDs.

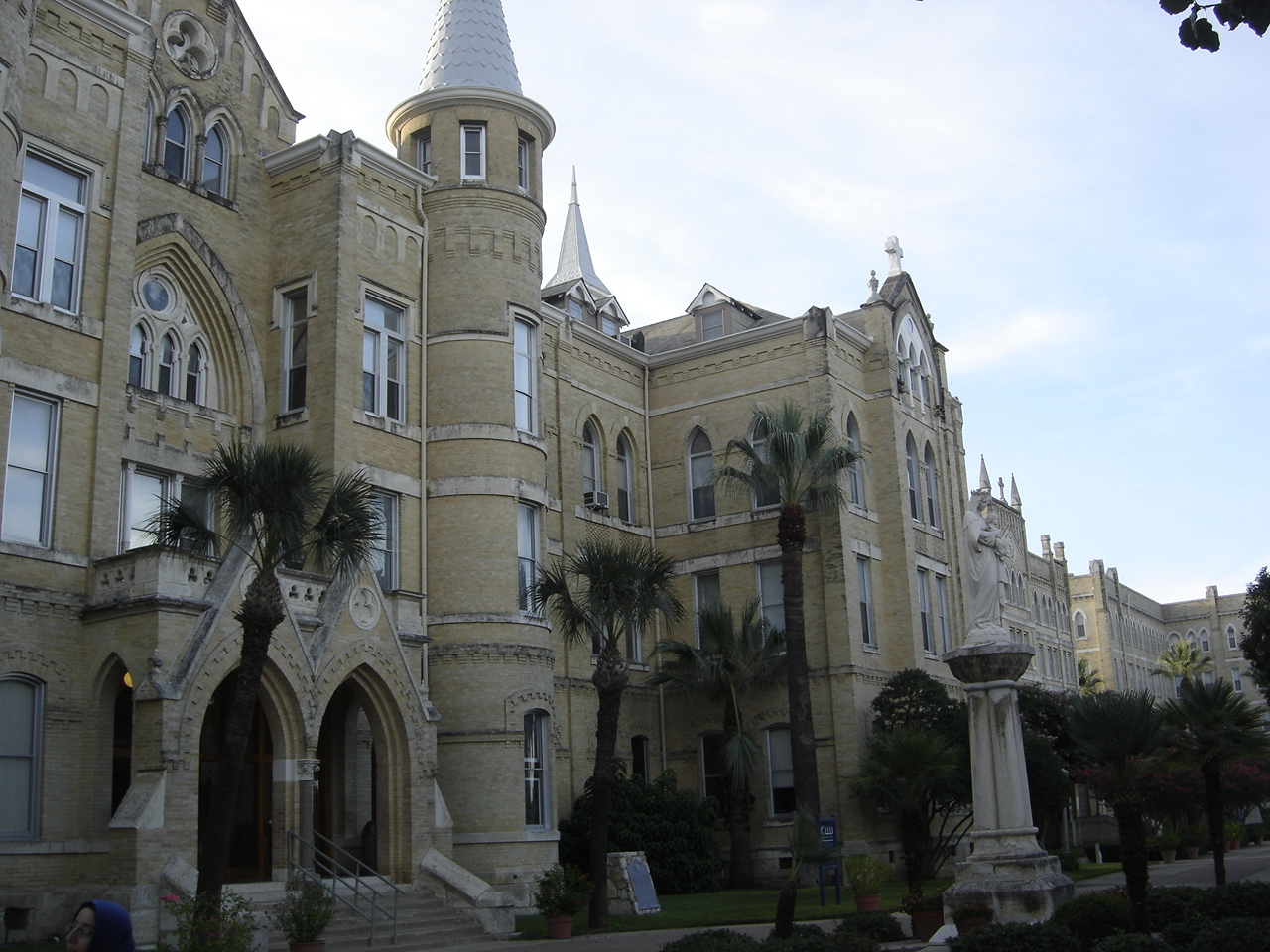
Main building

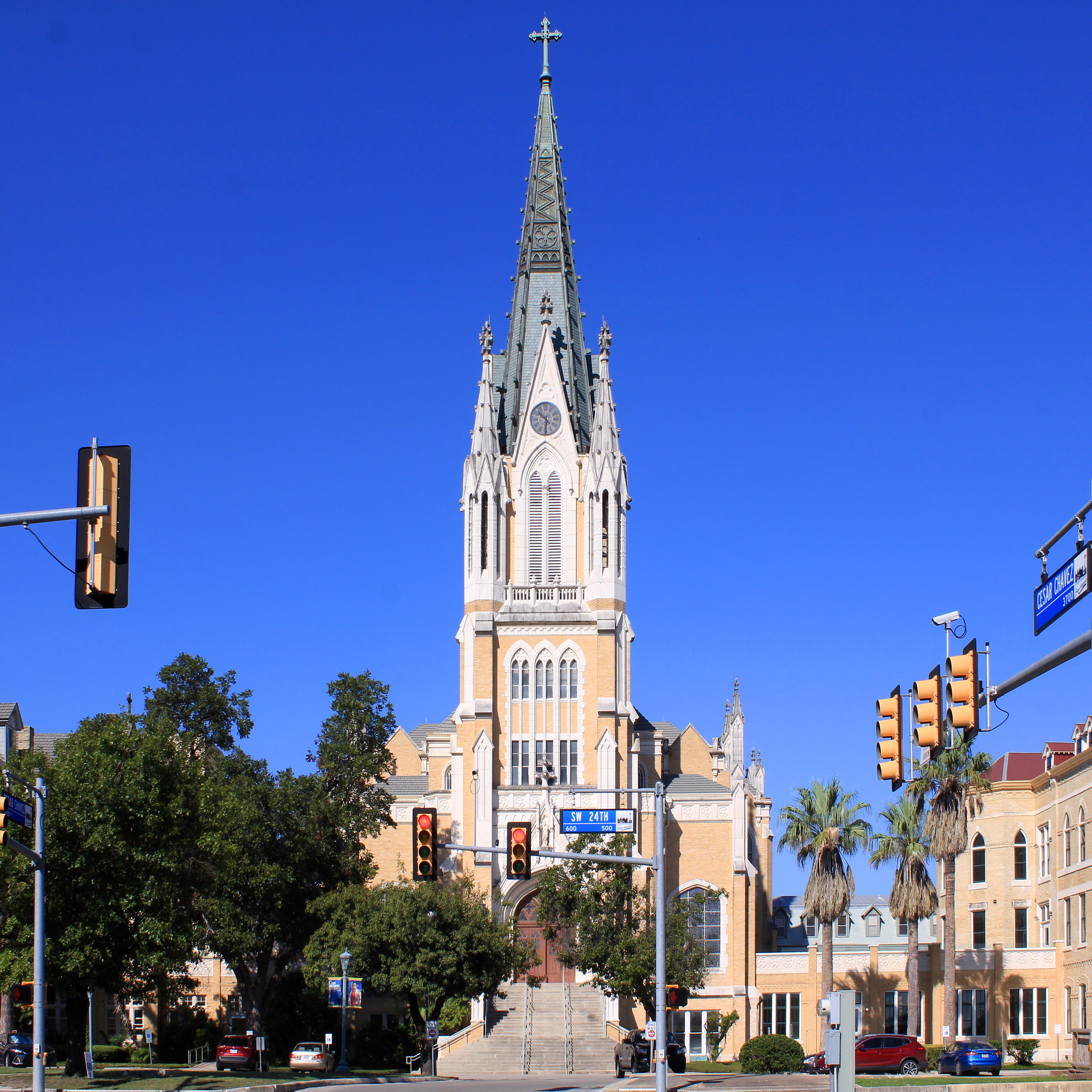
Sacred Heart Conventual Chapel

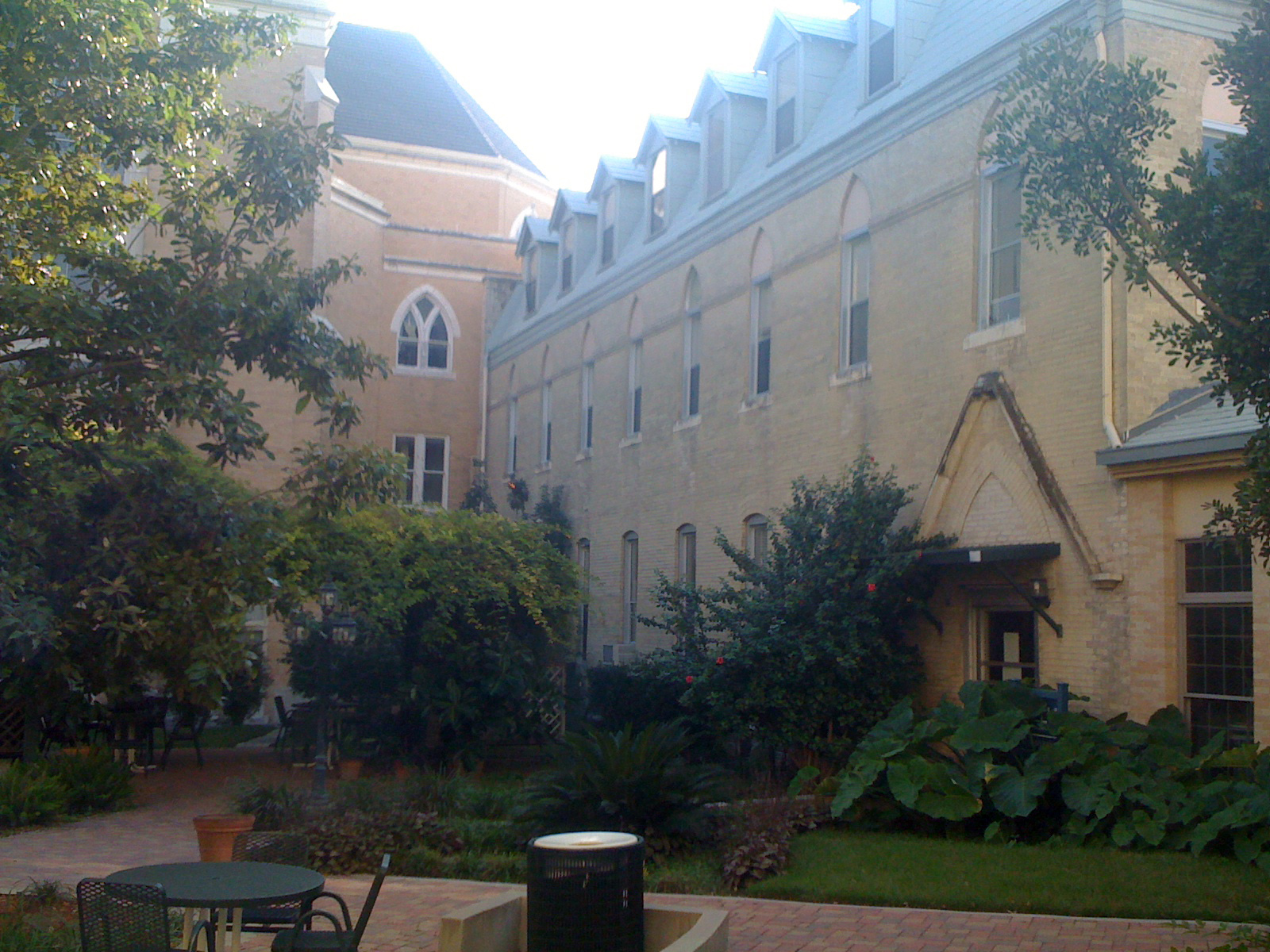
St. Anne's Courtyard

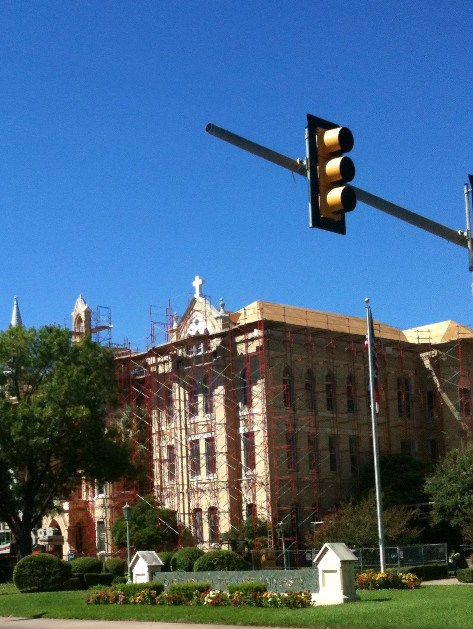
Roof going up

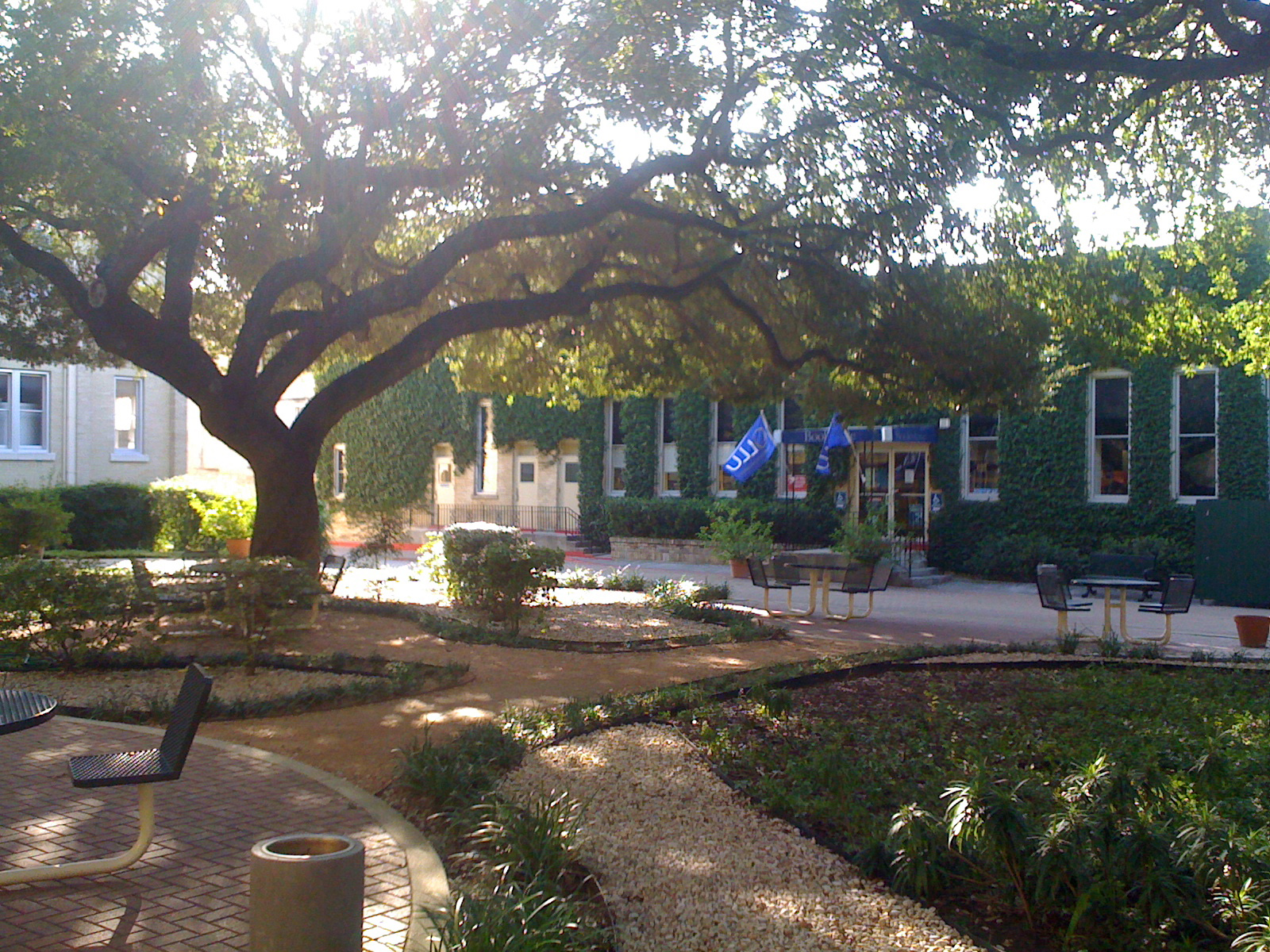
Anexes

== Student life ==
In 2007, the university hosted an initial event to kickstart San Japan, a local anime convention.

The campus has several fraternities and sororities on campus. The Latino fraternity Lambda Upsilon Lambda and Latina sorority Kappa Delta Chi are present alongside two multicultural sororities Delta Xi Nu and Theta Nu Xi.

The university also hosts over 50 clubs and organizations.

== Athletics ==
The Our Lady of the Lake (OLLU) athletic teams are called the Saints (formerly known as the Armadillos until 2009). The university is a member of the National Association of Intercollegiate Athletics (NAIA), primarily competing in the Red River Athletic Conference (RRAC) since the 2009–10 academic year. The Saints previously competed as an NAIA Independent within the Association of Independent Institutions (AII) from 2007–08 to 2008–09.

OLLU competes in 17 intercollegiate varsity sports: Men's sports include baseball, basketball, cross country, golf, soccer, tennis and track & field; while women's sports include basketball, cross country, golf, soccer, softball, tennis, track & field and volleyball; and co-ed sports include competitive cheer, competitive dance and drumline.

=== History ===
OLLU began its athletics program in 2007 with volleyball and men's soccer; followed by women's soccer, men's tennis, and men's golf in 2008; later softball, men's and women's basketball, and men's and women's cross-country in 2009, and finally baseball and men's and women's track and field in 2014. The university added women's golf, women's tennis, competitive cheer and dance for the 2020–21 school year, and began a drumline in 2022–23.

On December 12, 2020, the Saints men's basketball team defeated NCAA Division I member Texas State 61–58.

In 2021–22, the women's basketball team won their eighth RRAC regular-season title and fourth conference tournament title, going undefeated in conference play. They also made their ninth appearance in the NAIA National Tournament, losing to Wayland Baptist in the opening round. OLLU's softball team finished with the best overall record in the conference and advanced to the championship game of the NAIA National Championship Opening Round's Gulf Shores bracket. The Saints' women's 4 × 100 m relay team also made an appearance in the national championships.

On February 12, 2022, university play-by-play announcer Michael Thompson fell down the bleachers at a women's basketball game after suffering a cardiac arrest. He was rushed to the hospital and died shortly thereafter.

In 2022–23, the volleyball team reached their fourth consecutive RRAC tournament championship game. The softball team won its fourth RRAC regular season title and second conference tournament title, and achieved its highest-ever ranking in the NAIA national coaches' poll. The Saints also won the San Antonio Bracket of the NAIA Softball World Series Opening Round to advance to the first NAIA Softball World Series in program history. On April 29, 2023, the Saints men's track and field team won their first conference championship in school history.

On May 29, 2024, the OLLU softball team won the school's first NAIA national championship, defeating Jessup 2–0.

== Former operations ==
OLLU previously hosted weekend classes at Brookhaven College in Farmers Branch, Texas, near Dallas. The Dallas Weekend College (DWEC) began operations in the fall of 1994 and moved to Brookhaven in 1997.

== Notable people ==
=== Alumni ===
- Bernard Ardisana, military intelligence officer
- Robert Anthony Brucato, bishop and prelate
- Rosie Castro, civil rights activist
- Anna Eastman, former politician in the Texas House of Representatives
- Francis James Furey, prelate and bishop (honorary degree)
- Jon Garcia, director
- Julian S. Garcia, writer, op-ed writer for the San Antonio Express-News. He is the author of La Fantastica Curandera.
- Jovita González, folklorist, educator, and writer
- Naomi Gonzalez, attorney and former politician in the Texas House of Representatives
- Charles Victor Grahmann, prelate and bishop
- Maria Hernandez Ferrier, former government official and first president of Texas A&M University–San Antonio
- Arcadia Hernández López, bilingual educator
- Christine Hernandez, educator and former politician in the Texas House of Representatives
- William F. Kernan, United States Army General
- Charles Kettles, Medal of Honor recipient
- Jonathan Joss, actor
- Theresa Angela Lane, teacher and archivist
- Helen Miller, former member of the Iowa House of Representatives
- Ciro Rodriguez, politician and judge
- Mario Marcel Salas, civil rights activist
- Shelley Sekula-Gibbs, former member of the United States House of Representatives
- Elizabeth Anne Sueltenfuss, fourth president and first female president of the university
- D'Angelo Wallace, YouTube commentator
- Violeta Chamorro, ex-president, and only female president so far, of Nicaragua.

=== Faculty ===
- Sandra Cisneros, former writer-in-residence at the university
- Cynthia de las Fuentes, counseling psychologist
- Suzy González, artist and adjunct professor
- James Johnson Kelly, Tuskegee Airman and former university trustee
- Richard Santos, Bexar County Archivist and Trinity University graduate and premier professor of Chicano Studies.

== See also ==
- Education in Texas
