= Charles Kettles =

United States Army Medal of Honor recipient (1930–2019)

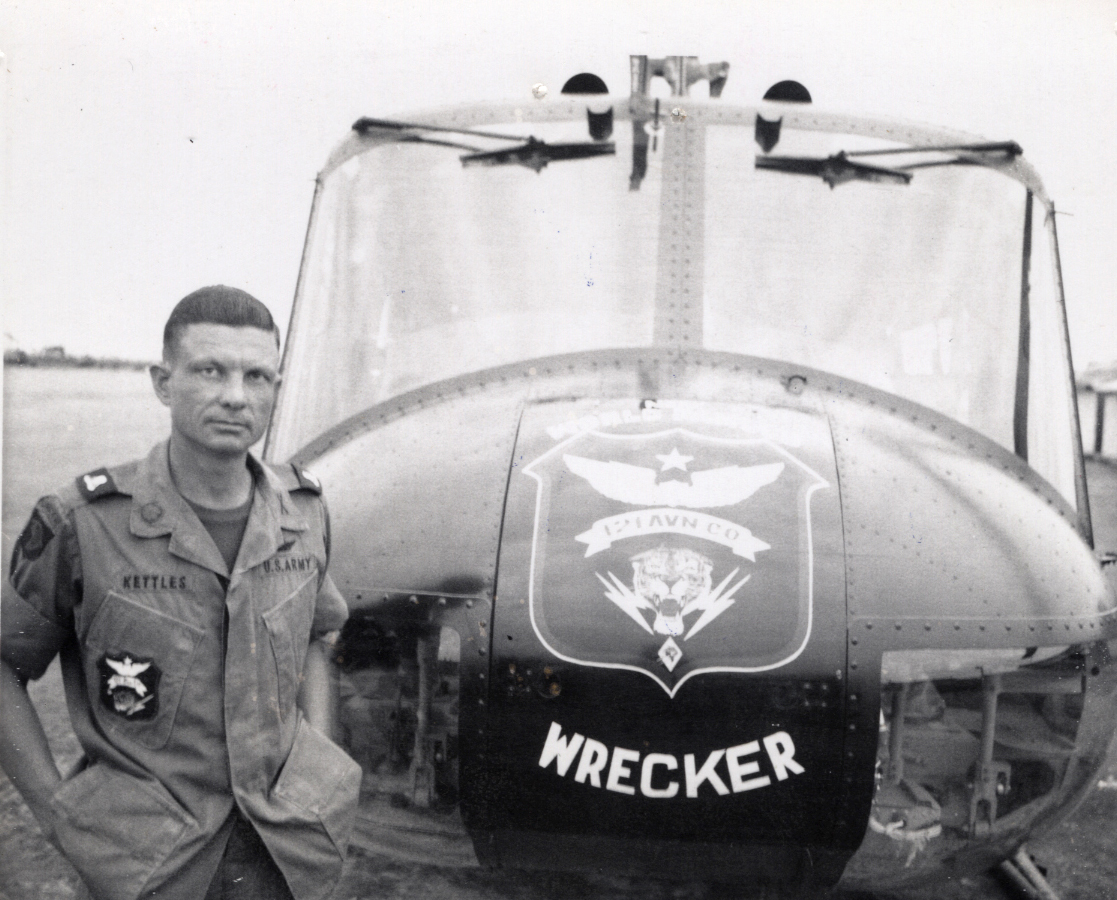
- Then Army Major Charles Kettles stands in front of a 121st Aviation Company UH-1H Huey helicopter during his second tour of duty in Vietnam in 1969.
- Born: Charles Seymour Kettles; January 9, 1930; Ypsilanti, Michigan, U.S.
- Died: January 21, 2019 (aged 89); Ypsilanti, Michigan, U.S.
- Burial place: Highland Cemetery, Ypsilanti, Michigan
- Military career
- Allegiance: United States
- Branch: United States Army
- Rank: Lieutenant colonel
- Commands: 176th Aviation Company (Airmobile) (Light), 14th Combat Aviation Battalion
- Awards: Medal of Honor; Legion of Merit; Bronze star (2); Army Commendation Medal (2); Valorous Unit Award
- Website: Official Website

Charles Seymour Kettles (January 9, 1930 – January 21, 2019) was a United States Army lieutenant colonel and a Medal of Honor recipient.

== Early life ==
Kettles was born in Ypsilanti, Michigan, on January 9, 1930. He studied engineering at Michigan State Normal College (now Eastern Michigan University).

== Military service ==
He was drafted into the United States Army at the age of 21. Upon completion of basic training at Camp Breckinridge, Kentucky, Kettles attended Officer Candidate School at Fort Knox, and earned his commission as an armor officer in the United States Army Reserve on February 28, 1953. He graduated from the Army Aviation School in 1954, before serving active duty tours in South Korea, Japan and Thailand.

After leaving active duty, Kettles established a Ford dealership in Dewitt, Michigan, and continued his service with the Army Reserve as a member of the 4th Battalion, 20th Field Artillery.

He volunteered for active duty in 1963 and underwent Helicopter Transition Training at Fort Wolters, Texas, in 1964. During a tour in France the following year, he was cross-trained to fly the Bell UH-1D "Huey" In 1966, he was assigned as a flight commander with the 176th Assault Helicopter Company, 14th Combat Aviation Battalion, and deployed to South Vietnam from February through November 1967. His second tour of duty in Vietnam lasted from October 1969 through October 1970. In 1970, he went to Fort Sam Houston in San Antonio, Texas, where he served as an aviation team chief and readiness coordinator supporting the Army Reserve. He remained in San Antonio until his retirement from the Army in 1978.

=== Medal of Honor ===
Kettles received the Medal of Honor on July 18, 2016, nearly 50 years after his actions while serving as a flight commander assigned to 176th Aviation Company (Airmobile) (Light), 14th Combat Aviation Battalion, Task Force Oregon.

Kettles was awarded the medal after legislation was introduced by Congresswoman Debbie Dingell, D-Dearborn, and U.S. Senators Gary Peters, D-Bloomfield Township, and Debbie Stabenow, D-Lansing as a result of a grassroots level campaign started in 2012 Ypsilanti Rotary Veterans History Project

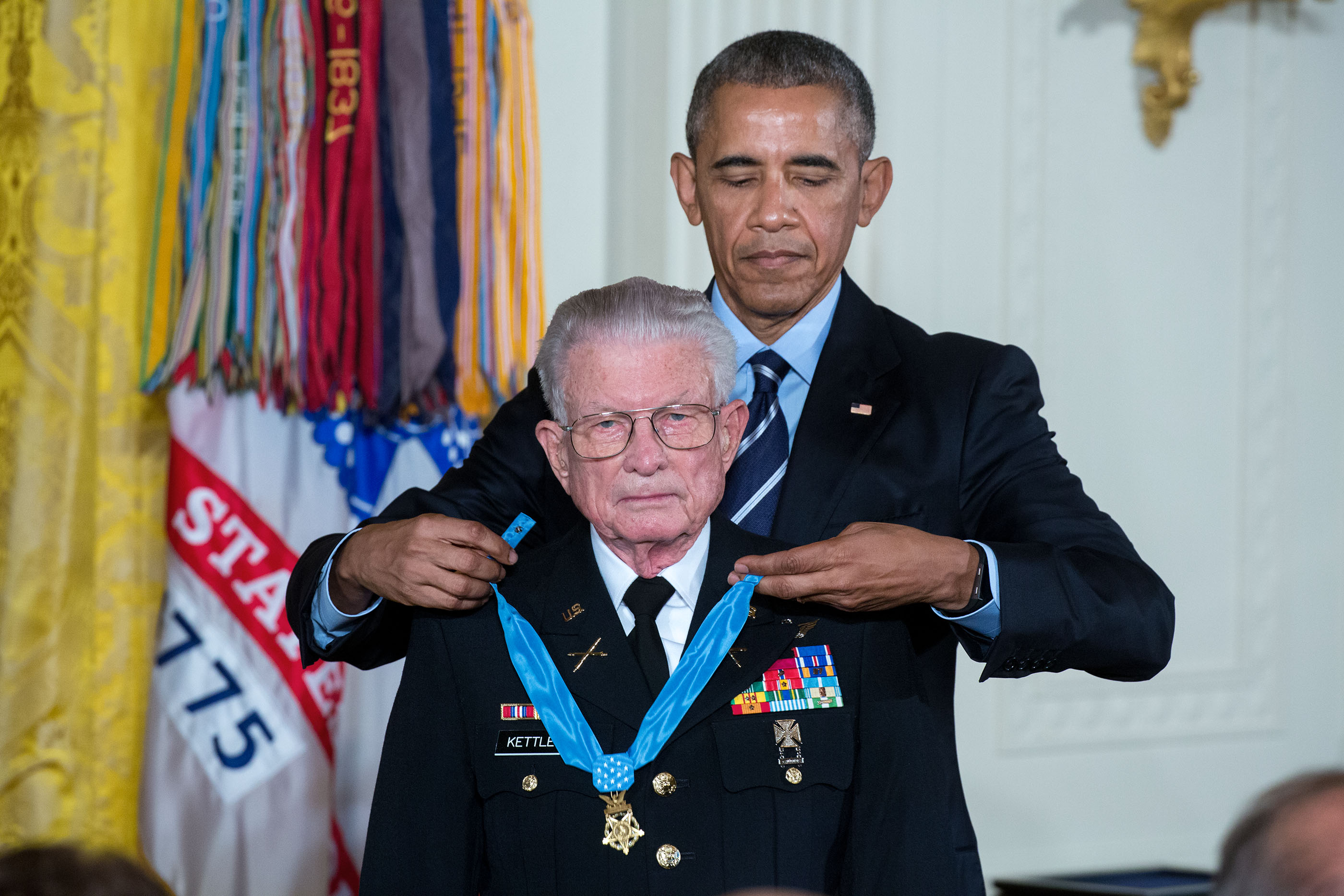
President Barack Obama awards the Medal of Honor to Kettles on July 18, 2016.

On May 15, 1967, personnel of the 1st Brigade, 101st Airborne Division, were ambushed in the Song Tra Cau riverbed by an estimated battalion-sized force of People's Army of Vietnam (PAVN) regulars with numerous automatic weapons, machine guns, mortars, and recoilless rifles. The PAVN fired from a fortified complex of deeply embedded tunnels and bunkers, and was shielded from suppressive fire. Upon hearing that the 1st Brigade had suffered casualties during an intense firefight with the enemy, then-Major Kettles volunteered to lead a flight of six UH-1D helicopters to bring reinforcements to the embattled force and to evacuate wounded personnel. As the flight approached the landing zone, it came under heavy fire from multiple directions and soldiers were hit and killed before they could dismount the arriving helicopters.

Small arms and automatic weapons fire continued to rake the landing zone, inflicting heavy damage to the helicopters and soldiers. Kettles, however, refused to depart until all reinforcements and supplies were off-loaded and wounded personnel were loaded on the helicopters to capacity. Kettles then led the flight out of the battle area and back to the staging area to pick up additional reinforcements.

With full knowledge of the intense fire awaiting his arrival, Kettles returned to the battlefield. Bringing additional reinforcements, he landed in the midst of mortar and automatic weapons fire that seriously wounded his gunner and severely damaged his aircraft. Upon departing, Kettles was advised by another helicopter crew that he had fuel streaming out of his aircraft. Despite the risk posed by the leaking fuel, he nursed the damaged aircraft back to base.

Later that day, the infantry battalion commander requested immediate, emergency extraction of the remaining 40 troops as well as four members of Kettles' unit who had become stranded when their helicopter was shot down. With only one flyable UH-1 helicopter remaining in his company, Kettles volunteered to return to the landing zone for a third time, leading a flight of six evacuation helicopters, five of which were from the 161st Aviation Company. During the extraction, Kettles was informed by the last helicopter that all personnel were on board, and departed the landing zone accordingly. Army gunships supporting the evacuation also departed the area.

While returning to base, Kettles was advised that eight troops had been unable to reach the evacuation helicopters due to the intense fire. With complete disregard for his own safety, Kettles passed the lead to another helicopter and returned to the landing zone to rescue the remaining troops. Without gunship, artillery, or tactical aircraft support, the PAVN concentrated all firepower on his lone aircraft, which was immediately hit by a mortar round that damaged the tail boom and a main rotor blade and shattered both front windshields and the chin bubble. His aircraft was further raked by small arms and machine gun fire.

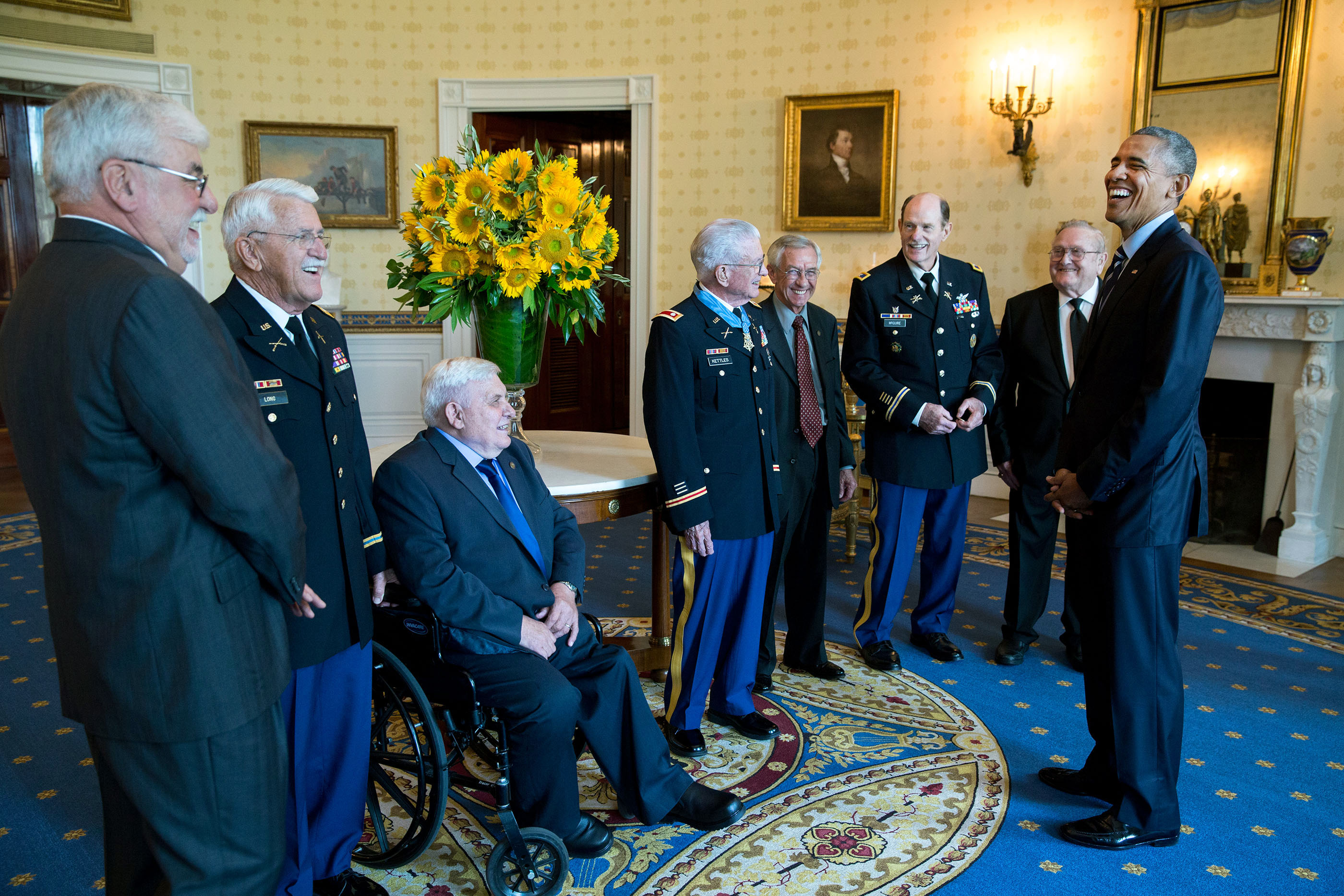
Obama talks with Kettles (center) and his guests, former brothers-in-arms from Vietnam, following the Medal of Honor ceremony for Kettles at the White House, July 18, 2016.

Despite the intense fire, Kettles maintained control of the aircraft and situation, allowing time for the remaining eight soldiers to board the aircraft. In spite of the severe damage to his helicopter, Kettles once more skillfully guided his heavily damaged aircraft to safety. Without his courageous actions and superior flying skills, the last group of soldiers and his crew would never have made it off the battlefield.

In 1968, Kettles received the Distinguished Service Cross (DSC) for these actions, and on July 18, 2016, following a special Act of Congress to extend the time limit for awarding the Medal of Honor (for this particular case only), his DSC was upgraded to the Medal of Honor.

A soldier who was there that day said "Maj. Kettles became our John Wayne," Obama said, adding his own take: "With all due respect to John Wayne, he couldn't do what Chuck Kettles did."

“We got the 44 out. None of those names appear on the wall in Washington. There's nothing more important than that.” – Retired Lt. Col. Charles Kettles

“You couldn't make this up. It's like a bad Rambo movie.” – President Barack Obama

== Later life ==
Kettles completed his bachelor's degree at Our Lady of the Lake University, San Antonio, Texas, and earned his master's degree at Eastern Michigan University, College of Technology, in commercial construction. He went on to develop the Aviation Management Program at the College of Technology and taught both disciplines. He later worked for Chrysler Pentastar Aviation until his retirement in 1993. Kettles resided in Ypsilanti, Michigan. He died in Ypsilanti on January 21, 2019, at the age of 89. In 2020, the Ann Arbor Veterans Affairs Medical Center, which is in the city next to his home town of Ypsilanti, was renamed the LTC Charles S. Kettles Veterans Affairs Medical Center in his honor.

== Awards and decorations ==
Kettles' awards and decorations include:

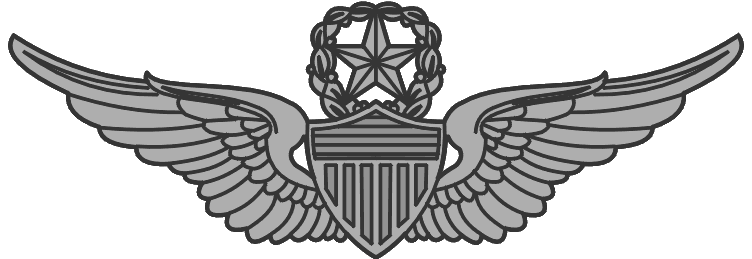

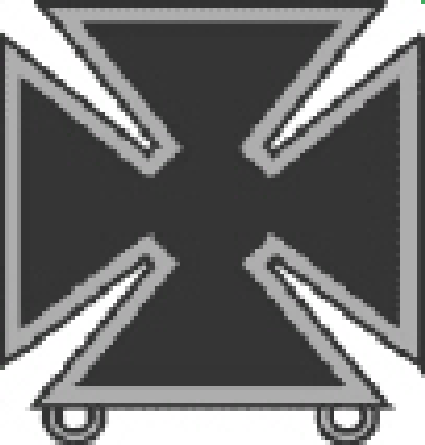

Master Army Aviator Badge
Medal of Honor		Legion of Merit
Distinguished Flying Cross	Bronze Star with one bronze oak leaf cluster	Air Medal (27 awards)
Army Commendation Medal with oak leaf cluster	National Defense Service Medal with one bronze service star	Korean Service Medal
Vietnam Service Medal with six service stars	Korea Defense Service Medal	Armed Forces Reserve Medal with bronze Hourglass device
Vietnam Gallantry Cross with Bronze Star	United Nations Korea Medal	Vietnam Campaign Medal
Marksmanship Badge with Carbine clasp
Valorous Unit Award		Vietnam Gallantry Cross Unit Citation

3 Overseas Service Bars
