= Lone Star College–University Center =

Lone Star College–University Center is a joint educational institution among six public and private Texas universities. It has been developed by Lone Star College System (LSCS) as a partnership of universities and the campuses of the community college system to provide unduplicated bachelor's degrees, master's degrees and continuing professional studies to the district service area. Partnerships, seamless articulated programs, collaborative governance, shared facilities, interactive telecommunications, and "first stop" student services provide the basis for LSC–University Center to serve as the critical link for community development and individual opportunity to over one and one-half million citizens of North Houston, North Harris County and Montgomery County.

The six partner institutions are: the University of Houston (UH), the University of Houston–Downtown (UHD), Texas A&M University–Victoria (TAMV), Our Lady of the Lake University, the University of St. Thomas, and Sam Houston State University.

The University Center operates two locations, one at Lone Star College–University Park and one at Lone Star College–Montgomery. University Park partners with TSU, SHSU, UH, and UHD. LSC-Montgomery partners with Our Lady of the Lake, Sam Houston, UHV, and St. Thomas.

LSC–University Center functions as a satellite, or distance, location for the partners to offer classes. Lone Star College's iSchool High program, one of two in Houston, allows high school students to earn both a high school diploma and an associate degree.
