= Julian S. Garcia =

Julian S. Garcia is an American writer. He has been involved in Chicano literature since the late 1970s when the San Antonio arts and politics journal Caracol had its offices on West Commerce Street in San Antonio, Texas. In 1985, Garcia became one of Caracol's associate editors. He was also an Associate editor of ViAztlan, an international journal of ideas and philosophy. A deconstructionist with a penchant for Aristotelian logic and a mentor to Tejano writers, Garcia has written articles and editorials under a nom-de-plume.

== Early life and education ==
Garcia graduated from Our Lady of the Lake College in San Antonio with a Bachelor of Arts degree in Sociology and Bilingual Education. He earned a master's degree in Bicultural-Bilingual Studies from the University of Texas at San Antonio in 1977. He then studied English literature at Southwest Texas State University.

== Career ==
Garcia is best known for his short stories in Caracol (which ran from 1974 to 1979), ViAztlan, and Saguaro.

As a short story writer and essayist, Garcia won the Caracol Fiction Prize, in 1979, with the publication of Las Manos (June 23, 1979). In 1984, the article Writing through Suffering won another prize in ViAztlan Vol. 2, No. 7 (April, 1984). In 1985, the publication of his essay, The New Age of Chicano Music was included in a special edition of ViAztlan, No. 3., No. 2. His story, Don Cheno's Icehouse subsequently appeared in ViAztlan (March, 1985). His recent opinion editorials have run in the San Antonio Express-News, San Francisco Chronicle, Laredo Morning News, AP, and Catch the Next's CTN Journal of Pedagogy and Creativity (West Haven, CT).

Poet Alurista published Garcia's The Harvest in the 1986 edition of Southwest Tales: A Contemporary Collection (Colorado State: Maize Press). In 1986 the University of Arizona published his story, El Viaje in its biannual journal, Saguaro.

After a ten-year hiatus, Garcia got back into fiction and published La Fantastica Curandera in Puentes (Texas A & M University-Corpus Christi, ed. Jesus Rosales). His short story, "La Vejita" is forthcoming from University of New Mexico's Chicano Journal Division. On February 28, 2026, Tiltwood Press published his literary novel, When ViAztlan was the Rage.

== Other publications ==
- Garcia, Julian, "When ViAztlan was the Rage". novel. Tiltwood Press/Books. February, 2026.
- Rosales, Jesus. Puentes: Revista Mexico-Chicana de Literatura, cultural y arte. No.4., Otono, 2006.
- Paz, Edward. J. "Julian S. Garcia", Dictionario de Escritores Chicanos, DF: Mexico. 2010.
- Garcia, Julian S. (May 4, 1980). "Career Education". San Antonio Light.
- Garcia, Julian S. (December 11, 2011). "Pancho Claus: Cousin from the South Pole". San Antonio Express-News. p. 3K.
- Garcia, Julian S. (December 20, 2011). "Classics and Literary Heroes". San Antonio Express-News.
- Garcia, Julian S. "ViAztlan: International Chicano Journal of Arts and Letters". Handbook of Texas Online. Texas State Historical Association.
- Garcia, Julian S. (November 16, 2024). "The Greatest Generation must be remembered". (newspaper=San Antonio Express-News.
