= Theresa Angela Lane =

American historian

Theresa Angela Lane (February 7, 1915 – August 6, 1974) was an American teacher, librarian, and archivist. She was the first to be professionally trained as an archivist at the Catholic Archives of Texas in Austin and helped found the Society of Southwest Archives, serving on the executive board. She was a featured speaker, lecturer, and writer on archival and historical topics.

== Early life and education ==
Theresa Angela Lane was born in Dobbin, Texas, on February 7, 1915. She was the first child of Michael W. and Mary Lou Lane who later had three more children. In June 1932, she graduated from St. Agnes Academy in Houston and joined the Dominican Sisters, taking the name Mary Claude. In 1953, she earned a Bachelor of Arts in Latin from Our Lady of the Lake College in San Antonio and completed her graduate studies in 1961, earning a Master's in Library Science from the University of Texas.

== Career ==
Lane taught classes, directed choir, and served as a librarian in Dominican elementary and high schools through Texas from 1933 to 1960. After she graduated with her MLS, she became the first professionally trained archivist at the Catholic Archives of Texas in Austin where she served from 1960 to 1974. While working in archives at University of Texas, she expanded the holdings and helped obtain documentation on Catholic clergy, religious communities, and parishes and dioceses throughout Texas. She "set-up and reorganized the collection. She prepared work guides, outlines, and a manual of procedures" in the beginning of her tenure.

Lane was a frequent speaker and lecturer on archives, religion, history, and, specifically, Texas Catholic history. She also wrote many articles for journals such as Catholic Library World, Texas Library Journal and the Texas Catholic Herald, and over twenty articles authored by her appear in the Handbook for Texas Supplement (1976). Her master's thesis was published in 1961 as Catholic Archives of Texas: History and Preliminary Inventory, which inspired and informed many scholars, researchers, and teachers of Texas' Catholic Archives.

=== Affiliations ===
- American Library Association, member
- Catholic Library Association
- Texas Library Association, vice chairman (1969)
- Society of American Archivists, member of subcommittee of the Church Archives Committee, now Religious Archives Section (1972)
- Society of Southwest Archivists, member, co-founder, executive board (1972)

== Death ==
On August 6, 1974, Lane died at the Dominican Retirement Home in Houston after a long illness.

=== The Award ===
In 1974, after Lane's death, the Society of Southwest Archivists created the Sister M. Claude Award. It is awarded annually and recognizes individuals who have made significant contributions to religious archives. It is the only award established, sponsored, and funded by a regional archival organization while the recipient is chosen and presented by the Society of American Archivists.
