= Arcadia Hernández López =

Mexican-American educator

- Born: December 21, 1909; Sabinas Hidalgo, Nuevo León, Mexico
- Died: January 16, 2007 (aged 97); San Antonio, Texas
- Other names: Arcadia Hernández
- Occupation: Teacher
- Known for: Bilingual education in Texas

Arcadia Hernández López was a Mexican-American teacher who developed new bilingual education programs in San Antonio, Texas.

== Early life ==
Arcadia Hernández López was born to Francisco López and Arcadia Garza López in Sabinas Hidalgo, a town in northern Mexico, in the state of Nuevo León. When she was three years old, her family settled in San Antonio, Texas after fleeing during the Mexican Revolution. She attended local schools and earned her bachelor's degree from Our Lady of the Lake University in 1934.

== Career ==
López attended the University of Texas, finishing with a master's degree in 1938. She taught elementary school for over three decades in San Antonio. She coordinated bilingual programs for San Antonio Independent School District (SAISD) for thirteen years. López earned her doctorate from Nova University in 1976. After 1964, she developed her own bilingual program for the district before retiring from SAISD in 1980. That year she accepted a post to oversee the training program for bilingual education at Our Lady of the Lake University. She wrote textbooks and worked as a consultant.

López published Barrio Teacher, a memoir of her family's experiences with the Mexican Revolution, and her own experiences with the transition to the United States and struggles with the Great Depression.

== Personal life ==
Arcadia wedded Johnny Deleon López in 1942. They divorced in 1968.

== Death and legacy ==
López died at home on January 16, 2007, and was interred at Holy Cross Cemetery in San Antonio. Her will created the Dr. Arcadia López Endowed Scholarship for bilingual pedagogy at the University of Texas-San Antonio. The Texas Senate passed a resolution in memory of López.
