= 1969 Notre Dame Fighting Irish football team =

American college football season

1969 Notre Dame Fighting Irish football

Cotton Bowl Classic, L 17–21 vs. Texas
- Conference: Independent

Ranking
- Coaches: No. 9
- AP: No. 5
- Record: 8–2–1
- Head coach: Ara Parseghian (6th season)
- Captains: Bob Olson; Mike Oriard
- Home stadium: Notre Dame Stadium

1969 NCAA University Division independents football records
	Conf.			Overall
Team	W	L	T	W		L		T
No. 2 Penn State		–		11	–	0	–	0
No. 17 West Virginia		–		10	–	1	–	0
No. 12 Houston		–		9	–	2	–	0
No. 5 Notre Dame		–		8	–	2	–	1
Buffalo		–		6	–	3	–	0
Rutgers		–		6	–	3	–	0
Villanova		–		6	–	3	–	0
Florida State		–		6	–	3	–	1
Colgate		–		5	–	3	–	1
Air Force		–		6	–	4	–	0
West Texas State		–		6	–	4	–	0
Boston College		–		5	–	4	–	0
New Mexico State		–		5	–	5	–	0
Southern Miss		–		5	–	5	–	0
Syracuse		–		5	–	5	–	0
Army		–		4	–	5	–	1
Virginia Tech		–		4	–	5	–	1
Georgia Tech		–		4	–	6	–	0
Miami (FL)		–		4	–	6	–	0
Pittsburgh		–		4	–	6	–	0
Dayton		–		3	–	7	–	0
Marshall		–		3	–	7	–	0
Northern Illinois		–		3	–	7	–	0
Tulane		–		3	–	7	–	0
Utah State		–		3	–	7	–	0
Navy		–		1	–	9	–	0
Xavier		–		1	–	9	–	0
Rankings from AP Poll

The 1969 Notre Dame Fighting Irish football team was an American football team that represented the University of Notre Dame as an independent during the 1969 NCAA University Division football season. In their sixth year under head coach Ara Parseghian, the Irish compiled an 8–2–1 record, outscored opponents by a total of 334 to 113, and were ranked No. 5 in the final AP poll and No. 9 in the final UPI poll. After 44 seasons without postseason play (1925–1968), Notre Dame ended its self-imposed bowl hiatus, losing to No. 1 Texas in the Cotton Bowl.

Defensive tackle Mike McCoy was a consensus first-team pick on the 1969 All-America college football team. Offensive tackle Jim Reilly and guard Larry DiNardo also received first-team All-America honors from at least one selector. The team's statistical leaders included quarterback Joe Theisman (1,531 passing yards), and split end Tom Gatewood (743 receiving yards), and halfbackDenny Allan (612 rushing yards, 54 points scored).

The team played its home games at Notre Dame Stadium in Notre Dame, Indiana.

== Schedule ==
Date	Time	Opponent	Rank	Site	TV	Result	Attendance	Source
September 20	1:30 pm	Northwestern	No. 11	Notre Dame Stadium; Notre Dame, IN (rivalry)		W 35–10	59,075	
September 27	1:30 pm	at No. 16 Purdue	No. 9	Ross–Ade Stadium; West Lafayette, IN (rivalry)		L 14–28	68,179	
October 4	1:30 pm	No. 14 Michigan State		Notre Dame Stadium; Notre Dame, IN (rivalry)		W 42–28	59,075	
October 11	2:00 pm	vs. Army	No. 15	Yankee Stadium; Bronx, NY (rivalry)		W 45–0	63,786	
October 18	1:30 pm	No. 3 USC	No. 11	Notre Dame Stadium; Notre Dame, IN (rivalry)		T 14–14	59,075	
October 25	8:30 pm	at Tulane	No. 12	Tulane Stadium; New Orleans, LA		W 37–0	40,250	
November 1	1:30 pm	Navy	No. 10	Notre Dame Stadium; Notre Dame, IN (rivalry)		W 47–0	59,075	
November 8	1:30 pm	at Pittsburgh	No. 8	Pitt Stadium; Pittsburgh, PA (rivalry)		W 49–7	44,084	
November 15	9:30 pm	at Georgia Tech	No. 9	Grant Field; Atlanta, GA (rivalry)	ABC	W 38–20	41,104	
November 22	1:30 pm	Air Force	No. 8	Notre Dame Stadium; Notre Dame, IN (rivalry)		W 13–6	59,075	
January 1, 1970	2:00 pm	vs. No. 1 Texas	No. 9	Cotton Bowl; Dallas, TX (Cotton Bowl)	CBS	L 17–21	71,938	
Rankings from AP Poll released prior to the game; All times are in Eastern time

== Game summaries ==
=== Northwestern ===
Team	1	2	3	4	Total
Northwestern	10	0	0	0	10
• Notre Dame	14	0	0	21	35

- Date: September 20
- Location: Notre Dame Stadium, South Bend, IN
- Game start: 1:30 pm EDT
- Game attendance: 59,075

Scoring summary
{{{Time}}}	{{{Team}}}	{{{Event}}}	{{{Score}}}
{{{Time}}}	{{{Team}}}	{{{Event}}}	{{{Score}}}

=== Purdue ===
Team	1	2	3	4	Total
Notre Dame	0	7	0	7	14
• Purdue	7	7	7	7	28

- Date: September 27
- Location: Ross-Ade Stadium, West Lafayette, IN
- Game start: 1:30 p.m. EDT

Scoring summary
{{{Time}}}	{{{Team}}}	{{{Event}}}	{{{Score}}}
{{{Time}}}	{{{Team}}}	{{{Event}}}	{{{Score}}}

=== Michigan State ===
Team	1	2	3	4	Total
Michigan St.	0	14	7	7	28
• Notre Dame	7	14	14	7	42

- Date: October 4
- Location: Notre Dame Stadium, South Bend, IN
- Game start: 1:30 pm EDT
- Game attendance: 59,075

Scoring summary
{{{Time}}}	{{{Team}}}	{{{Event}}}	{{{Score}}}
{{{Time}}}	{{{Team}}}	{{{Event}}}	{{{Score}}}

=== Army ===
Team	1	2	3	4	Total
• Notre Dame	10	14	14	7	45
Army	0	0	0	0	0

- Date: October 11
- Location: Yankee Stadium, Bronx, NY
- Game start: 2:00 p.m. EDT

Scoring summary
{{{Time}}}	{{{Team}}}	{{{Event}}}	{{{Score}}}
{{{Time}}}	{{{Team}}}	{{{Event}}}	{{{Score}}}

=== USC ===
Team	1	2	3	4	Total
USC	0	0	7	7	14
Notre Dame	0	0	7	7	14

- Date: October 18
- Location: Notre Dame Stadium, South Bend, IN
- Game start: 1:30 pm EDT
- Game attendance: 59,075

Scoring summary
{{{Time}}}	{{{Team}}}	{{{Event}}}	{{{Score}}}
{{{Time}}}	{{{Team}}}	{{{Event}}}	{{{Score}}}

=== Tulane ===
Team	1	2	3	4	Total
• Notre Dame	7	17	7	6	37
Tulane	0	0	0	0	0

- Date: October 25
- Location: Tulane Stadium, New Orleans, LA
- Game start: 7:30 p.m. CDT

Scoring summary
{{{Time}}}	{{{Team}}}	{{{Event}}}	{{{Score}}}
{{{Time}}}	{{{Team}}}	{{{Event}}}	{{{Score}}}

=== Navy ===
Team	1	2	3	4	Total
Navy	0	0	0	0	0
• Notre Dame	7	26	14	0	47

- Date: November 1
- Location: Notre Dame Stadium, South Bend, IN
- Game start: 1:30 pm EST
- Game attendance: 59,075

Scoring summary
{{{Time}}}	{{{Team}}}	{{{Event}}}	{{{Score}}}
{{{Time}}}	{{{Team}}}	{{{Event}}}	{{{Score}}}

=== Pittsburgh ===
Team	1	2	3	4	Total
• Notre Dame	14	21	14	0	49
Pittsburgh	7	0	0	0	7

- Date: November 8
- Location: Pitt Stadium, Pittsburgh, PA
- Game start: 1:30 p.m. EST

Scoring summary
{{{Time}}}	{{{Team}}}	{{{Event}}}	{{{Score}}}
{{{Time}}}	{{{Team}}}	{{{Event}}}	{{{Score}}}

=== Georgia Tech ===
Team	1	2	3	4	Total
• Notre Dame	21	10	7	0	38
Georgia Tech	0	6	0	14	20

- Date: November 15
- Location: Grant Field, Atlanta, GA
- Game start: 9:30 p.m. EST
- Television network: ABC

Scoring summary
{{{Time}}}	{{{Team}}}	{{{Event}}}	{{{Score}}}
{{{Time}}}	{{{Team}}}	{{{Event}}}	{{{Score}}}

=== Air Force ===
Team	1	2	3	4	Total
Air Force	0	3	0	3	6
• Notre Dame	7	6	0	0	13

- Date: November 22
- Location: Notre Dame Stadium, South Bend, IN
- Game attendance: 59,075

Scoring summary
1	ND	Allan 39-yard run (Hempel kick)	ND 7-0
2	ND	Hempel 22-yard field goal	ND 10-0
2	ND	Hempel 25-yard field goal	ND 13-0
2	AF	Leuthauser 28-yard field goal	ND 13-3
4	AF	Leuthauser 37-yard field goal	ND 13-6

=== Vs. Texas (Cotton Bowl) ===
#9 Notre Dame vs. #1 Texas

Team	1	2	3	4	Total
Fighting Irish	3	7	0	7	17
• Longhorns	0	7	0	14	21

- Date: January 1
- Location: Cotton Bowl, Dallas, Texas
- Game attendance: 71,938
- Referee: Cliff Domingue
- Television network: CBS

== Roster ==
1969 Notre Dame Fighting Irish football team roster
Players
Coaches
Offense

Pos.	#	Name	Class
RB	22	Denny Allan	Jr
RB	33	Bill Barz	Jr
OT	64	Terry Brennan	Sr
G	56	Larry DiNardo	Jr
WR	44	Tom Gatewood	So
G	62	Gary Kos	Jr
TE	87	Tom Lawson	Sr
QB	1	Tom Menie	So
RB	18	Bob Minnix	So
RB	28	Chuck Nightingale	Jr
C	50	Dan Novakov	So
C	54	Mike Oriard	Sr
G	61	Jim Reilly	Sr
OT	63	Jim Ruzicka	Sr
WR	92	Paul Snow	Sr
QB	7	Joe Theismann	Jr
WR	82	Bill Trapp	So
RB	32	Ed Ziegler	Sr

Defense

Pos.	#	Name	Class
DB	17	Mike Crotty	So
DB	23	Clarence Ellis	So
DT	82	Tom Gasseling	Jr
DB	46	John Gasser	Sr
LB	42	Tim Kelly	Jr
DT	77	Mike McCoy	Sr
LB	43	Tom McHale	Jr
DT	74	Pat Mudron	Jr
DL	88	Bob Neidert	Jr
LB	45	Eric Patton	So
DE	85	Walt Patulski	So
DE	96	Al Pope	So
DB	11	Don Reid	Sr
LB	24	Larry Schumacher	Sr
DB	16	James Sheahan	Jr
DB	15	John Standring	Sr
DB	21	Ralph Stepaniak	So
DE	93	Fred Swendsen	So
LB	38	Rick Thomann	So
LB	40	Jim Wright	Jr
DL	79	Mike Zikas	So
DB	27	Chuck Zloch	Jr
DT	91	Jay Ziznweski	Sr
LB	49	Tim Zuber	So

Special teams

Pos.	#	Name	Class
P	81	Jim DeArrieta	Sr
K	52	Scott Hempel	Jr
P	9	Jim Yoder	So

Head coach

- Ara Parseghian

Coordinators/assistant coaches

Legend

- (C) Team captain
- (S) Suspended
- (I) Ineligible
- Injured
- Redshirt

== Statistics ==
Team statistics. Notre Dame tallied 4,489 yards of total (448.9 yards per game) offense on 868 plays, an average of 5.2 yards per play. The team's offensive output included of 2,905 rushing yards, an average of 4.4 yards per rush and 290.5 per game. The team also tallied 1,584 passing yards (158.4 yards per game), completing 113 of 205 passing attempts (.441 completion percentage) with 16 interceptions and 13 touchdown passes.

On defense, the Irish gave up 2,187 yards of total offense (3.3 yards per attempt, 218.7 yards per game), consisting of 851 rushing yards (2.3 yards per carry, 84.1 yards per game) and 1,336 passing yards (4.6 yards per attempt, 133.6 yards per game).

Total offense.

1. Quarterback Joe Theisman - 1,909 yards on 308 plays
2. Halfback Denny Allan - 612 yards on 149 plays
3. Halfback Ed Ziegler - 483 yards on 94 plays
4. Quarterback Bill Etter - 363 yards on 41 plays
5. Fullback Bill Barz - 362 yards on 90 plays
6. Halfback Andy Huff - 264 yards on 69 plays

Passing.

1. Joe Theisman completed 108 of 192 passes (.562 completion percentage) for 1,531 yards with 16 interceptions and 13 touchdowns

Rushing

1. Denny Allan - 612 yards on 148 carries, 4.1-yard average
2. Ed Ziegler - 483 yards on 94 carries, 5.1-yard averag
3. Joe Theisman - 378 yards on 116 carries, 3.2-yard average
4. Bill Barz - 362 yards on 90 carries, 4.0-yard average
5. Bill Etter - 310 yards on 29 carries, 10.7-yard average
6. Andy Huff - 265 yards on 69 carries, 3.8-yard average
7. Mike Crotty - 183 yards on 43 carries, 4.3-yard average
8. Jim Yoder - 130 yards on 23 carries, 5.6-yard average

Receiving

1. Thom Gatewood - 47 receptions for 743 yards, 15.8-yard average, 8 touchdowns
2. Bill Barz - 24 receptions for 262 yards, 10.9-yard average, 2 touchdowns
3. Denny Allan - 11 receptions for 199 yards, 18.1-yard average, 0 touchdowns
4. Dewey Poskon - 13 receptions for 175 yards, 13.5-yard average, 0 touchdowns
5. Ed Ziegler - 7 receptions for 116 yards, 16.7-yard average, 2 touchdowns

Scoring

1. Scott Hempel - 56 points, 5 of 7 field goals, 41 of 44 PAT
2. Denny Allan - 54 points, 9 touchdowns
3. Thom Gatewood - 48 points, 8 touchdowns
4. Bill Barz - 42 points, 7 touchdowns
5. Joe Theisman - 37 points, 6 touchdowns, 1 two-point conversion
6. Andy Huff - 36 points, 6 touchdowns
7. Ed Ziegler - 26 points, 4 touchdowns, 1 two-point conversion
8. Bill Etter - 18 points, 3 touchdowns

Tackles.

1. Bob Olson - 142
2. Mike McCoy - 88
3. Kelly - 71
4. Mike Kadish - 68
5. Raterman - 67

== 1970 NFL draft ==
Player	Position	Round	Pick	Franchise
Mike McCoy	Guard	1	2	Green Bay Packers
Jim Reilly	Guard	3	57	Buffalo Bills
Bob Olson	Linebacker	5	107	Boston Patriots
Mike Oriard	Center	5	130	Kansas City Chiefs
Terry Brennan	Tackle	7	158	Philadelphia Eagles
