= 1969 Northern Illinois Huskies football team =

American college football season

1969 Northern Illinois Huskies football
- Conference: Independent
- Record: 3–7
- Head coach: Doc Urich (1st season)
- MVPs: Steve Parker; James Patterson
- Captains: James Patterson; Bruce Bray
- Home stadium: Huskie Stadium

1969 NCAA University Division independents football records
	Conf.			Overall
Team	W	L	T	W		L		T
No. 2 Penn State		–		11	–	0	–	0
No. 17 West Virginia		–		10	–	1	–	0
No. 12 Houston		–		9	–	2	–	0
No. 5 Notre Dame		–		8	–	2	–	1
Buffalo		–		6	–	3	–	0
Rutgers		–		6	–	3	–	0
Villanova		–		6	–	3	–	0
Florida State		–		6	–	3	–	1
Colgate		–		5	–	3	–	1
Air Force		–		6	–	4	–	0
West Texas State		–		6	–	4	–	0
Boston College		–		5	–	4	–	0
New Mexico State		–		5	–	5	–	0
Southern Miss		–		5	–	5	–	0
Syracuse		–		5	–	5	–	0
Army		–		4	–	5	–	1
Virginia Tech		–		4	–	5	–	1
Georgia Tech		–		4	–	6	–	0
Miami (FL)		–		4	–	6	–	0
Pittsburgh		–		4	–	6	–	0
Dayton		–		3	–	7	–	0
Marshall		–		3	–	7	–	0
Northern Illinois		–		3	–	7	–	0
Tulane		–		3	–	7	–	0
Utah State		–		3	–	7	–	0
Navy		–		1	–	9	–	0
Xavier		–		1	–	9	–	0
Rankings from AP Poll

The 1969 Northern Illinois Huskies football team represented Northern Illinois University as an independent during the 1969 NCAA University Division football season. Led by first-year head coach Doc Urich, the Huskies compiled a record of 3–7. The team played home games at Huskie Stadium in DeKalb, Illinois.

This was Northern Illinois' first year at the highest level in college football, having made the transition from NCAA College Division to NCAA University Division after the previous season. The Huskies remained an independent for five more seasons until joining the Mid-American Conference (MAC) in 1975.

== Schedule ==
Date	Time	Opponent	Site	Result	Attendance	Source
September 13	7:30 p.m.	at North Dakota State	Dacotah Field; Fargo, ND	L 0–28	9,900	
September 20	7:30 p.m.	Idaho	Huskie Stadium; DeKalb, IL	W 47–30	15,912–16,000	
September 27	8:00 p.m.	at West Texas State	Buffalo Bowl; Canyon, TX	L 7–22	16,200	
October 4		at Marshall	Fairfield Stadium; Huntington, WV	W 18–17	4,800	
October 11		Western Kentucky	Huskie Stadium; DeKalb, IL	L 12–14	13,517	
October 18	12:30 p.m.	at Dayton	Baujan Field; Dayton, OH	L 24–56	13,483	
October 25	1:30 p.m.	Ball State	Huskie Stadium; DeKalb, IL (rivalry)	W 17–13	17,552	
November 8	1:30 p.m.	Toledo	Huskie Stadium; DeKalb, IL	L 21–35	11,483	
November 15	1:30 p.m.	Western Michigan	Huskie Stadium; DeKalb, IL	L 22–31	9,900	
November 22		at Bowling Green	Doyt Perry Stadium; Bowling Green, OH	L 23–38	7,864	
All times are in Central time
