= 1969 Xavier Musketeers football team =

American college football season

1969 Xavier Musketeers football
- Conference: Independent
- Record: 1–9
- Head coach: Irvin A. Etler (1st season)
- Home stadium: Xavier Stadium

1969 NCAA University Division independents football records
	Conf.			Overall
Team	W	L	T	W		L		T
No. 2 Penn State		–		11	–	0	–	0
No. 17 West Virginia		–		10	–	1	–	0
No. 12 Houston		–		9	–	2	–	0
No. 5 Notre Dame		–		8	–	2	–	1
Buffalo		–		6	–	3	–	0
Rutgers		–		6	–	3	–	0
Villanova		–		6	–	3	–	0
Florida State		–		6	–	3	–	1
Colgate		–		5	–	3	–	1
Air Force		–		6	–	4	–	0
West Texas State		–		6	–	4	–	0
Boston College		–		5	–	4	–	0
New Mexico State		–		5	–	5	–	0
Southern Miss		–		5	–	5	–	0
Syracuse		–		5	–	5	–	0
Army		–		4	–	5	–	1
Virginia Tech		–		4	–	5	–	1
Georgia Tech		–		4	–	6	–	0
Miami (FL)		–		4	–	6	–	0
Pittsburgh		–		4	–	6	–	0
Dayton		–		3	–	7	–	0
Marshall		–		3	–	7	–	0
Northern Illinois		–		3	–	7	–	0
Tulane		–		3	–	7	–	0
Utah State		–		3	–	7	–	0
Navy		–		1	–	9	–	0
Xavier		–		1	–	9	–	0
Rankings from AP Poll

The 1969 Xavier Musketeers football team was an American football team that represented Xavier University as an independent during the 1969 NCAA University Division football season. In their first and only year under head coach Irvin A. Etler, the Musketeers compiled a 1–9 record.

== Schedule ==
Date	Time	Opponent	Site	Result	Attendance	Source
September 13		at Miami (OH)	Miami Field; Oxford, OH	L 7–35	13,269	
September 20		at Buffalo	Rotary Field; Buffalo, NY	L 0–17	8,468	
September 27	8:00 p.m.	Kent State	Corcoran Stadium; Cincinnati, OH	L 7–23	8,881	
October 4	7:00 p.m.	at Cincinnati	Nippert Stadium; Cincinnati, OH (rivalry)	L 14–17	17,519	
October 11	1:30 p.m.	at Ohio	Peden Stadium; Athens, OH	L 6–31	19,278	
October 25	1:30 p.m.	Villanova	Corcoran Stadium; Cincinnati, OH	L 7–35	6,881	
November 1	1:30 p.m.	at Dayton	Baujan Field; Dayton, OH	L 14–32	7,632	
November 15		Quantico Marines	Corcoran Stadium; Cincinnati, OH	W 9–7	1,518	
November 22	1:30 p.m.	Toledo	Corcoran Stadium; Cincinnati, OH	L 0–35	2,281	
November 29	4:00 p.m.	at UTEP	Sun Bowl; El Paso, TX	L 10–17	5,100–5,150	
All times are in Eastern time
