= 1969 Villanova Wildcats football team =

American college football season

1969 Villanova Wildcats football
- Conference: Independent
- Record: 6–3
- Head coach: Jack Gregory (3rd season)
- Captains: Gene Arthur; Thomas Boyd
- Home stadium: Villanova Stadium

1969 NCAA University Division independents football records
	Conf.			Overall
Team	W	L	T	W		L		T
No. 2 Penn State		–		11	–	0	–	0
No. 17 West Virginia		–		10	–	1	–	0
No. 12 Houston		–		9	–	2	–	0
No. 5 Notre Dame		–		8	–	2	–	1
Buffalo		–		6	–	3	–	0
Rutgers		–		6	–	3	–	0
Villanova		–		6	–	3	–	0
Florida State		–		6	–	3	–	1
Colgate		–		5	–	3	–	1
Air Force		–		6	–	4	–	0
West Texas State		–		6	–	4	–	0
Boston College		–		5	–	4	–	0
New Mexico State		–		5	–	5	–	0
Southern Miss		–		5	–	5	–	0
Syracuse		–		5	–	5	–	0
Army		–		4	–	5	–	1
Virginia Tech		–		4	–	5	–	1
Georgia Tech		–		4	–	6	–	0
Miami (FL)		–		4	–	6	–	0
Pittsburgh		–		4	–	6	–	0
Dayton		–		3	–	7	–	0
Marshall		–		3	–	7	–	0
Northern Illinois		–		3	–	7	–	0
Tulane		–		3	–	7	–	0
Utah State		–		3	–	7	–	0
Navy		–		1	–	9	–	0
Xavier		–		1	–	9	–	0
Rankings from AP Poll

The 1969 Villanova Wildcats football team represented the Villanova University during the 1969 NCAA University Division football season. The head coach was Jack Gregory, coaching his third season with the Wildcats. The team played their home games at Villanova Stadium in Villanova, Pennsylvania.

== Schedule ==
Date	Time	Opponent	Site	Result	Attendance	Source
September 13	1:30 p.m.	West Chester	Villanova Stadium; Villanova, PA	W 41–14	12,861	
September 20	8:00 p.m.	at Toledo	Glass Bowl; Toledo, OH	L 18–45	14,987	
September 27		at Delaware	Delaware Stadium; Newark, DE (rivalry)	W 36–33	14,017	
October 4	1:35 p.m.	Santa Clara^{†}	Villanova Stadium; Villanova, PA	W 57–8	12,637	
October 18		at Boston College	Alumni Stadium; Chestnut Hill, MA	W 24–6	23,200	
October 25	1:30 p.m.	at Xavier	Corcoran Stadium; Cincinnati, OH	W 35–7	6,881	
November 8	1:30 p.m.	Dayton	Villanova Stadium; Villanova, PA	L 20–27	12,173	
November 15	1:30 p.m.	William & Mary	Villanova Stadium; Villanova, PA	W 35–21	7,320	
November 22	1:31 p.m.	Buffalo	Villanova Stadium; Villanova, PA	L 14–24	7,825	
^{†}Homecoming; All times are in Eastern time
