= 1969 West Texas State Buffaloes football team =

American college football season

1969 West Texas State Buffaloes football
- Conference: Independent
- Record: 6–4
- Head coach: Joe Kerbel (10th season)
- Home stadium: Buffalo Bowl

1969 NCAA University Division independents football records
	Conf.			Overall
Team	W	L	T	W		L		T
No. 2 Penn State		–		11	–	0	–	0
No. 17 West Virginia		–		10	–	1	–	0
No. 12 Houston		–		9	–	2	–	0
No. 5 Notre Dame		–		8	–	2	–	1
Buffalo		–		6	–	3	–	0
Rutgers		–		6	–	3	–	0
Villanova		–		6	–	3	–	0
Florida State		–		6	–	3	–	1
Colgate		–		5	–	3	–	1
Air Force		–		6	–	4	–	0
West Texas State		–		6	–	4	–	0
Boston College		–		5	–	4	–	0
New Mexico State		–		5	–	5	–	0
Southern Miss		–		5	–	5	–	0
Syracuse		–		5	–	5	–	0
Army		–		4	–	5	–	1
Virginia Tech		–		4	–	5	–	1
Georgia Tech		–		4	–	6	–	0
Miami (FL)		–		4	–	6	–	0
Pittsburgh		–		4	–	6	–	0
Dayton		–		3	–	7	–	0
Marshall		–		3	–	7	–	0
Northern Illinois		–		3	–	7	–	0
Tulane		–		3	–	7	–	0
Utah State		–		3	–	7	–	0
Navy		–		1	–	9	–	0
Xavier		–		1	–	9	–	0
Rankings from AP Poll

The 1969 West Texas State Buffaloes football team represented West Texas State University (now known as West Texas A&M University) as an independent during the 1969 NCAA University Division football season. In their tenth season under head coach Joe Kerbel, the Buffaloes compiled a 6–4 record. West Texas State played home games at the Buffalo Bowl in Canyon, Texas.

== Schedule ==
Date	Time	Opponent	Site	Result	Attendance	Source
September 20		Northern Arizona	Buffalo Bowl; Canyon, TX	L 20–21	16,000	
September 27	8:00 p.m.	Northern Illinois	Buffalo Bowl; Canyon, TX	W 22–7	16,200	
October 4	1:30 p.m.	at Wichita State	Cessna Stadium; Wichita, KS	W 24–14	15,145	
October 11	8:00 p.m.	San Diego State	Buffalo Bowl; Canyon, TX	L 14–24	14,000	
October 18	2:30 p.m.	at Colorado State	Hughes Stadium; Fort Collins, CO	L 7–27	17,360	
October 25	1:50 p.m.	New Mexico State	Buffalo Bowl; Canyon, TX	W 17–16	16,500	
November 1		at UT Arlington	Memorial Stadium; Arlington, TX	W 41–7	7,000	
November 8	12:30 p.m.	at Western Michigan	Waldo Stadium; Kalamazoo, MI	W 28–20	15,500	
November 15	2:00 p.m.	Bowling Green	Buffalo Bowl; Canyon, TX	W 28–12	12,000	
November 29	1:30 p.m.	at Southern Miss	Faulkner Field; Hattiesburg, MS	L 9–10	11,600	
All times are in Central time
