= 1969 Utah State Aggies football team =

American college football season

1969 Utah State Aggies football
- Conference: Independent
- Record: 3–7
- Head coach: Chuck Mills (3rd season)
- Home stadium: Romney Stadium

1969 NCAA University Division independents football records
	Conf.			Overall
Team	W	L	T	W		L		T
No. 2 Penn State		–		11	–	0	–	0
No. 17 West Virginia		–		10	–	1	–	0
No. 12 Houston		–		9	–	2	–	0
No. 5 Notre Dame		–		8	–	2	–	1
Buffalo		–		6	–	3	–	0
Rutgers		–		6	–	3	–	0
Villanova		–		6	–	3	–	0
Florida State		–		6	–	3	–	1
Colgate		–		5	–	3	–	1
Air Force		–		6	–	4	–	0
West Texas State		–		6	–	4	–	0
Boston College		–		5	–	4	–	0
New Mexico State		–		5	–	5	–	0
Southern Miss		–		5	–	5	–	0
Syracuse		–		5	–	5	–	0
Army		–		4	–	5	–	1
Virginia Tech		–		4	–	5	–	1
Georgia Tech		–		4	–	6	–	0
Miami (FL)		–		4	–	6	–	0
Pittsburgh		–		4	–	6	–	0
Dayton		–		3	–	7	–	0
Marshall		–		3	–	7	–	0
Northern Illinois		–		3	–	7	–	0
Tulane		–		3	–	7	–	0
Utah State		–		3	–	7	–	0
Navy		–		1	–	9	–	0
Xavier		–		1	–	9	–	0
Rankings from AP Poll

The 1969 Utah State Aggies football team was an American football team that represented Utah State University as an independent during the 1969 NCAA University Division football season. In their third season under head coach Chuck Mills, the Aggies compiled a 3–7 record and were outscored by a total of 250 to 134.

The team's statistical leaders included Dave Holman with 1,511 passing yards, George Tribble with 469 rushing yards, and Wes Garnett with 439 receiving yards.

== Schedule ==
Date	Time	Opponent	Site	Result	Attendance	Source
September 13	12:30 p.m.	at Wichita State	Cessna Stadium; Wichita, KS	L 7–17	28,248	
September 20	11:30 a.m.	at Bowling Green	Doyt Perry Stadium; Bowling Green, OH	W 14–6	14,644	
September 27	1:30 p.m.	Pacific (CA)	Romney Stadium; Logan, UT	L 3–36	10,137	
October 11		Colorado State	Romney Stadium; Logan, UT	L 33–37	8,497	
October 18	12:00 p.m.	at Army	Michie Stadium; West Point, NY	W 23–7	34,000	
October 25		Memphis State	Romney Stadium; Logan, UT	L 0–40	14,505	
November 1		at Utah	Ute Stadium; Salt Lake City, UT (rivalry)	L 7–27	22,699	
November 8	1:00 p.m.	at No. 19 Air Force	Falcon Stadium; Colorado Springs, CO	L 13–38	37,271	
November 15		BYU	Romney Stadium; Logan, UT (rivalry)	L 3–21	15,123	
November 22		at Idaho	Rogers Field; Pullman, WA	W 31–21	5,621	
Rankings from AP Poll released prior to the game; All times are in Mountain time
