= 1969 Georgia Tech Yellow Jackets football team =

American college football season

1969 Georgia Tech Yellow Jackets football
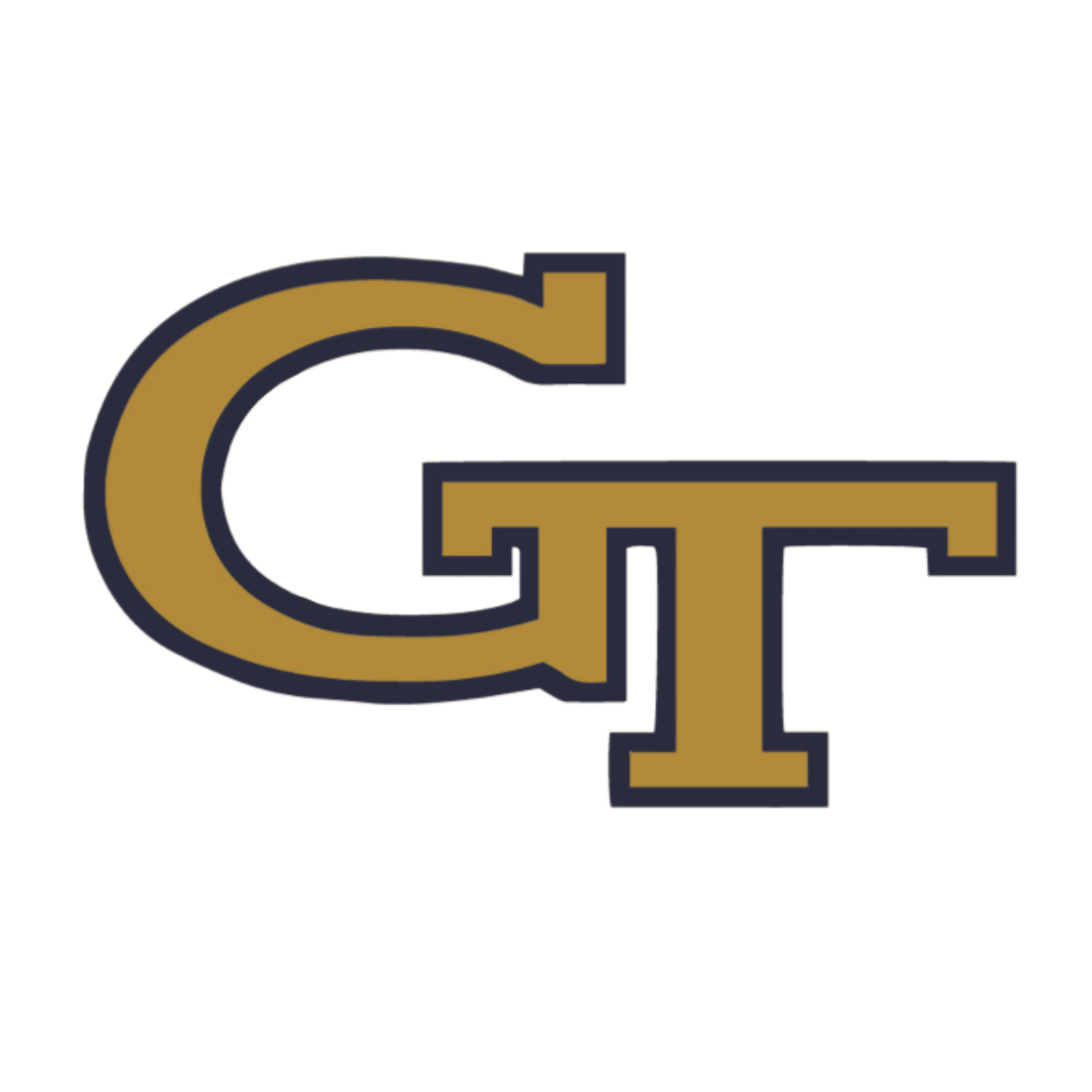
- Conference: Independent
- Record: 4–6
- Head coach: Bud Carson (3rd season)
- Offensive coordinator: Bill Crutchfield (2nd season)
- Captains: Gene Spiotta; Rock Perdoni
- Home stadium: Grant Field

1969 NCAA University Division independents football records
	Conf.			Overall
Team	W	L	T	W		L		T
No. 2 Penn State		–		11	–	0	–	0
No. 17 West Virginia		–		10	–	1	–	0
No. 12 Houston		–		9	–	2	–	0
No. 5 Notre Dame		–		8	–	2	–	1
Buffalo		–		6	–	3	–	0
Rutgers		–		6	–	3	–	0
Villanova		–		6	–	3	–	0
Florida State		–		6	–	3	–	1
Colgate		–		5	–	3	–	1
Air Force		–		6	–	4	–	0
West Texas State		–		6	–	4	–	0
Boston College		–		5	–	4	–	0
New Mexico State		–		5	–	5	–	0
Southern Miss		–		5	–	5	–	0
Syracuse		–		5	–	5	–	0
Army		–		4	–	5	–	1
Virginia Tech		–		4	–	5	–	1
Georgia Tech		–		4	–	6	–	0
Miami (FL)		–		4	–	6	–	0
Pittsburgh		–		4	–	6	–	0
Dayton		–		3	–	7	–	0
Marshall		–		3	–	7	–	0
Northern Illinois		–		3	–	7	–	0
Tulane		–		3	–	7	–	0
Utah State		–		3	–	7	–	0
Navy		–		1	–	9	–	0
Xavier		–		1	–	9	–	0
Rankings from AP Poll

The 1969 Georgia Tech Yellow Jackets football team represented the Georgia Institute of Technology as an independent during the 1969 NCAA University Division football season. The Yellow Jackets were led by third-year head coach Bud Carson and played their home games at Grant Field in Atlanta.

== Schedule ==
Date	Opponent	Site	TV	Result	Attendance	Source
September 20	SMU	Grant Field; Atlanta, GA		W 24–21	46,624	
September 27	Baylor	Grant Field; Atlanta, GA		W 17–10	37,776	
October 4	Clemson	Grant Field; Atlanta, GA (rivalry)		L 10–21	50,224	
October 11	at No. 10 Tennessee	Neyland Stadium; Knoxville, TN (rivalry)		L 8–26	63,171	
October 18	No. 15 Auburn	Grant Field; Atlanta, GA (rivalry)		L 14–17	59,464	
October 25	at No. 7 USC	Los Angeles Memorial Coliseum; Los Angeles, CA		L 18–29	53,341	
November 1	Duke^{†}	Grant Field; Atlanta, GA		W 20–7	41,113	
November 8	at Tulane	Tulane Stadium; New Orleans, LA		L 7–14	19,450	
November 15	No. 9 Notre Dame	Grant Field; Atlanta, GA (rivalry)	ABC	L 20–38	41,104	
November 29	Georgia	Grant Field; Atlanta, GA (Clean, Old-Fashioned Hate)		W 6–0	60,106	
^{†}Homecoming; Rankings from AP Poll released prior to the game
