= 1969 Southern Miss Southerners football team =

American college football season

1969 Southern Miss Southerners football
- Conference: Independent
- Record: 5–5
- Head coach: P. W. Underwood (1st season)
- Home stadium: Faulkner Field

1969 NCAA University Division independents football records
	Conf.			Overall
Team	W	L	T	W		L		T
No. 2 Penn State		–		11	–	0	–	0
No. 17 West Virginia		–		10	–	1	–	0
No. 12 Houston		–		9	–	2	–	0
No. 5 Notre Dame		–		8	–	2	–	1
Buffalo		–		6	–	3	–	0
Rutgers		–		6	–	3	–	0
Villanova		–		6	–	3	–	0
Florida State		–		6	–	3	–	1
Colgate		–		5	–	3	–	1
Air Force		–		6	–	4	–	0
West Texas State		–		6	–	4	–	0
Boston College		–		5	–	4	–	0
New Mexico State		–		5	–	5	–	0
Southern Miss		–		5	–	5	–	0
Syracuse		–		5	–	5	–	0
Army		–		4	–	5	–	1
Virginia Tech		–		4	–	5	–	1
Georgia Tech		–		4	–	6	–	0
Miami (FL)		–		4	–	6	–	0
Pittsburgh		–		4	–	6	–	0
Dayton		–		3	–	7	–	0
Marshall		–		3	–	7	–	0
Northern Illinois		–		3	–	7	–	0
Tulane		–		3	–	7	–	0
Utah State		–		3	–	7	–	0
Navy		–		1	–	9	–	0
Xavier		–		1	–	9	–	0
Rankings from AP Poll

The 1969 Southern Miss Southerners football team was an American football team that represented the University of Southern Mississippi as an independent during the 1969 NCAA University Division football season. In their first year under head coach P. W. Underwood, the team compiled a 5–5 record.

== Schedule ==
Date	Time	Opponent	Site	Result	Attendance	Source
September 20		Southeastern Louisiana	Faulkner Field; Hattiesburg, MS	W 14–6	12,200	
September 27		at No. 15 Alabama	Denny Stadium; Tuscaloosa, AL	L 14–63	50,035	
October 3		Idaho	Ladd Stadium; Mobile, AL	L 21–31	7,132	
October 11		at Mississippi State	Scott Field; Starkville, MS	L 20–34	21,000	
October 18		at No. 19 Ole Miss	Hemingway Stadium; Oxford, MS	L 7–69	25,283	
October 25		Richmond^{†}	Faulkner Field; Hattiesburg, MS	W 31–28	11,000	
November 1		at Louisiana Tech	Louisiana Tech Stadium; Ruston, LA (rivalry)	W 24–23	20,000	
November 8		at Memphis State	Memphis Memorial Stadium; Memphis, TN (rivalry)	L 7–37	18,808	
November 22		at East Carolina	Ficklen Memorial Stadium; Greenville, NC	W 14–7	3,500	
November 29	1:30 p.m.	West Texas State	Faulkner Field; Hattiesburg, MS	W 10–9	11,600	
^{†}Homecoming; Rankings from AP Poll released prior to the game; All times are in Central time
