= 1969 Penn State Nittany Lions football team =

American college football season

1969 Penn State Nittany Lions football

Co-national champion (FACT, Sagarin) Eastern champion Orange Bowl champion

Orange Bowl, W 10–3 vs. Missouri
- Conference: Independent

Ranking
- Coaches: No. 2
- AP: No. 2
- Record: 11–0
- Head coach: Joe Paterno (4th season)
- Offensive scheme: I formation
- Defensive coordinator: Jim O'Hora (4th season)
- Base defense: 4–3
- Captains: Tom Jackson; Mike Reid; Steve Smear
- Home stadium: Beaver Stadium

1969 NCAA University Division independents football records
	Conf.			Overall
Team	W	L	T	W		L		T
No. 2 Penn State		–		11	–	0	–	0
No. 17 West Virginia		–		10	–	1	–	0
No. 12 Houston		–		9	–	2	–	0
No. 5 Notre Dame		–		8	–	2	–	1
Buffalo		–		6	–	3	–	0
Rutgers		–		6	–	3	–	0
Villanova		–		6	–	3	–	0
Florida State		–		6	–	3	–	1
Colgate		–		5	–	3	–	1
Air Force		–		6	–	4	–	0
West Texas State		–		6	–	4	–	0
Boston College		–		5	–	4	–	0
New Mexico State		–		5	–	5	–	0
Southern Miss		–		5	–	5	–	0
Syracuse		–		5	–	5	–	0
Army		–		4	–	5	–	1
Virginia Tech		–		4	–	5	–	1
Georgia Tech		–		4	–	6	–	0
Miami (FL)		–		4	–	6	–	0
Pittsburgh		–		4	–	6	–	0
Dayton		–		3	–	7	–	0
Marshall		–		3	–	7	–	0
Northern Illinois		–		3	–	7	–	0
Tulane		–		3	–	7	–	0
Utah State		–		3	–	7	–	0
Navy		–		1	–	9	–	0
Xavier		–		1	–	9	–	0
Rankings from AP Poll

The 1969 Penn State Nittany Lions football team represented Pennsylvania State University as an independent during the 1969 NCAA University Division football season.

Despite posting its second consecutive undefeated, untied season, the Nittany Lions did not have a shot at the national championship. President Richard Nixon said that he would consider the winner of the December 6 matchup between the Texas Longhorns and the Arkansas Razorbacks, then ranked at the top of the polls, and the real voters do not seem to have differed. Paterno, at the 1973 commencement, was quoted saying, "I'd like to know how could the president know so little about Watergate in 1973 and so much about college football in 1969?" Then Pennsylvania Governor Raymond P. Shafer got the White House's attention with Penn State's two-season undefeated streak. A White House assistant called Paterno to invite him and the team to the White House to receive a trophy for their accomplishment. Paterno has stated many times that he responded with, "You can tell the president to take that trophy and shove it."

Penn State declined an invitation to play the Texas/Arkansas winner in the Cotton Bowl Classic, instead playing sixth-ranked Missouri in the Orange Bowl. Penn State beat Missouri 10–3, while Texas beat Notre Dame 21–17 and was recognized as the consensus national champion. Penn State was selected co-national champion by FACT and Sagarin, both NCAA-designated major selectors.

== Schedule ==
Date	Time	Opponent	Rank	Site	TV	Result	Attendance	Source
September 20	2:00 p.m.	at Navy	No. 3	Navy–Marine Corps Memorial Stadium; Annapolis, MD		W 45–22	28,796	
September 27		Colorado	No. 2	Beaver Stadium; University Park, PA		W 27–3	51,342	
October 4		at Kansas State	No. 2	KSU Stadium; Manhattan, KS		W 17–14	37,000	
October 11		No. 17 West Virginia^{†}	No. 5	Beaver Stadium; University Park, PA (rivalry)		W 20–0	52,713	
October 18		at Syracuse	No. 5	Archbold Stadium; Syracuse, NY (rivalry)		W 15–14	42,491	
October 25	1:30 p.m.	Ohio	No. 8	Beaver Stadium; University Park, PA		W 42–3	49,419	
November 1		Boston College	No. 5	Beaver Stadium; University Park, PA	CBS	W 38–16	48,532	
November 15		Maryland	No. 5	Beaver Stadium; University Park, PA (rivalry)		W 48–0	46,106	
November 22		at Pittsburgh	No. 4	Pitt Stadium; Pittsburgh, PA (rivalry)		W 27–7	39,517	
November 29		at NC State	No. 3	Carter Stadium; Raleigh, NC	ABC	W 33–8	24,150	
January 1, 1970		vs. No. 6 Missouri	No. 2	Miami Orange Bowl; Miami, FL (Orange Bowl)	NBC	W 10–3	78,282	
^{†}Homecoming; Rankings from AP Poll released prior to the game; All times are in Eastern time; Source:

== Game summaries ==
=== Pittsburgh ===
Team	1	2	3	4	Total
• Penn State	7	0	7	13	27
Pittsburgh	0	7	0	0	7

- Date: November 22
- Location: Pitt Stadium, Pittsburgh
- Game attendance: 39,517

Scoring summary
1	PSU	Harris 24-yard run (Reitz kick)	PSU 7-0
2	PITT	Esposito 6-yard run (Cramer kick)	Tied 7-7
3	PSU	Pittman 4-yard run (Reitz kick)	PSU 14-7
4	PSU	Pittman 17-yard run (Reitz kick)	PSU 21-7
4	PSU	Abbey 18-yard run (kick failed)	PSU 27-7

=== NC State ===
Team	1	2	3	4	Total
• Penn St	3	14	6	10	33
NC State	0	0	0	8	8

- Date: November 29
- Location: Carter Stadium
- Game attendance: 24,150

Scoring summary
Q1	PSU	Reitz 27 yard field goal	PSU 3–0
Q2	PSU	Pittman 5 yard run (Reitz kick)	PSU 10–0
Q2	PSU	Mitchell 1 yard run (Reitz kick)	PSU 17–0
Q3	PSU	Pittman 5 yard run (kick failed)	PSU 23–0
Q4	PSU	Reitz 35 yard field goal	PSU 26–0
Q4	PSU	Pittman 13 yard pass from Burkhart (Reitz kick)	PSU 33–0
Q4	NCST	Walker 71 yard interception return (Sharp pass from Bowers)	PSU 33–8

== Personnel ==
1969 Penn State Nittany Lions football team roster
Players
Coaches
Offense

Pos.	#	Name	Class
RB	36	Don Abbey	Sr
WR	44	Charlie Adams	Jr
QB	22	Chuck Burkhart	Sr
WR	11	Wally Cirafesi	Sr
QB	25	Mike Cooper	Jr
RB	43	Gary Deuel	Jr
WR	88	Greg Edmonds	Jr
RB	42	Fran Ganter	Jr
RB	34	Franco Harris	So
OL	67	Bob Holuba	Jr
OL	63	Tom Jackson	Sr
WR	40	Pete Johnson	Sr
C	56	Warren Koegel	Jr
WR	86	Jim McCord	Jr
RB	23	Lydell Mitchell	So
TE	77	Wayne Munson	So
QB, P	13	Bob Parsons	So
RB	24	Charlie Pittman	Sr
RB	46	Joel Ramich	Jr
OT	78	Vic Surma	Jr
RB	41	Charlie Wilson	Jr
G	60	Charlie Zapiec	Jr

Defense

Pos.	#	Name	Class
DE	89	John Ebersole	Sr
LB	33	Jack Ham	Jr
DL	80	Gary Hull	Jr
DB	47	Paul Johnson	Sr
LB	55	Jim Kates	Sr
DB	31	George Landis	Jr
LB	35	Dennis Onkotz	Sr
LB	52	David Radakovich	Sr
DL	87	David Rakiecki	Sr
DT	68	Mike Reid	Sr
DL	76	Steve Smear	Sr
LB	10	Mike Smith	Jr
DB	26	Neal Smith	Sr

Special teams

Pos.	#	Name	Class

Head coach

- Joe Paterno

Coordinators/assistant coaches

- Earl Bruce
- Jim O'Hora
- Frank Patrick
- Bob Phillips
- Dan Radakovich
- Jerry Sandusky
- Jim Weaver
- George Welsh
- J. T. White

Legend

- (C) Team captain
- (S) Suspended
- (I) Ineligible
- Injured
- Redshirt

Roster

== Awards ==
- Mike Reid
  - Maxwell Award
  - Outland Trophy

== NFL draft ==
Eight Nittany Lions were selected in the 1970 NFL draft.

Round	Pick	Overall	Name	Position	Team
1st	7	7	Mike Reid	Defensive tackle	Cincinnati Bengals
3rd	6	58	Charlie Pittman	Running back	St. Louis Cardinals
3rd	20	72	Dennis Onkotz	Linebacker	New York Jets
4th	17	95	Steve Smear	Defensive end/Linebacker	Baltimore Colts
4th	20	98	John Ebersole	Linebacker	New York Jets
7th	23	179	Don Abbey	Fullback	Dallas Cowboys
8th	17	199	Paul Johnson	Running back	Washington Redskins
12th	17	303	James Kates	Linebacker	Washington Redskins
