= 1969 Marshall Thundering Herd football team =

American college football season

1969 Marshall Thundering Herd football
- Conference: Independent
- Record: 3–7
- Head coach: Rick Tolley (1st season)
- Home stadium: Fairfield Stadium

1969 NCAA University Division independents football records
	Conf.			Overall
Team	W	L	T	W		L		T
No. 2 Penn State		–		11	–	0	–	0
No. 17 West Virginia		–		10	–	1	–	0
No. 12 Houston		–		9	–	2	–	0
No. 5 Notre Dame		–		8	–	2	–	1
Buffalo		–		6	–	3	–	0
Rutgers		–		6	–	3	–	0
Villanova		–		6	–	3	–	0
Florida State		–		6	–	3	–	1
Colgate		–		5	–	3	–	1
Air Force		–		6	–	4	–	0
West Texas State		–		6	–	4	–	0
Boston College		–		5	–	4	–	0
New Mexico State		–		5	–	5	–	0
Southern Miss		–		5	–	5	–	0
Syracuse		–		5	–	5	–	0
Army		–		4	–	5	–	1
Virginia Tech		–		4	–	5	–	1
Georgia Tech		–		4	–	6	–	0
Miami (FL)		–		4	–	6	–	0
Pittsburgh		–		4	–	6	–	0
Dayton		–		3	–	7	–	0
Marshall		–		3	–	7	–	0
Northern Illinois		–		3	–	7	–	0
Tulane		–		3	–	7	–	0
Utah State		–		3	–	7	–	0
Navy		–		1	–	9	–	0
Xavier		–		1	–	9	–	0
Rankings from AP Poll

The 1969 Marshall Thundering Herd football team was an American football team that represented Marshall University as an independent during the 1969 NCAA University Division football season. In its first season under head coach Rick Tolley, the team compiled a 3–7 record and was outscored by a total of 281 to 207. The team played its home games at Fairfield Stadium in Huntington, West Virginia.

Prior to the season, Marshall was suspended indefinitely from the Mid-American Conference due to committing a number of recruiting violations.

== Schedule ==
Date	Time	Opponent	Site	Result	Attendance	Source
September 20		at Morehead State	Jayne Stadium; Morehead, KY	L 14–27		
September 27	8:00 p.m.	Toledo	Fairfield Stadium; Huntington, WV	L 13–38	7,000	
October 4		Northern Illinois	Fairfield Stadium; Huntington, WV	L 17–18	4,800	
October 11		at Miami (OH)	Miami Field; Oxford, OH	L 7–35	10,907	
October 18	8:03 p.m.	at Louisville	Fairgrounds Stadium; Louisville, KY	L 17–34	8,206	
October 25	1:30 p.m.	at Western Michigan	Waldo Stadium; Kalamazoo, MI	L 14–48	22,200	
November 1		Bowling Green^{†}	Fairfield Stadium; Huntington, WV	W 21–16	6,000	
November 8		at Kent State	Memorial Stadium; Kent, OH	W 31–20	4,244	
November 15		East Carolina	Fairfield Stadium; Huntington, WV (rivalry)	W 38–7	5,500	
November 22		Ohio	Fairfield Stadium; Huntington, WV (rivalry)	L 35–38	8,200	
^{†}Homecoming; All times are in Eastern time
