= 1969 Virginia Tech Gobblers football team =

American college football season

1969 Virginia Tech Gobblers football
- Conference: Independent
- Record: 4–5–1
- Head coach: Jerry Claiborne (9th season)
- Home stadium: Lane Stadium

1969 NCAA University Division independents football records
	Conf.			Overall
Team	W	L	T	W		L		T
No. 2 Penn State		–		11	–	0	–	0
No. 17 West Virginia		–		10	–	1	–	0
No. 12 Houston		–		9	–	2	–	0
No. 5 Notre Dame		–		8	–	2	–	1
Buffalo		–		6	–	3	–	0
Rutgers		–		6	–	3	–	0
Villanova		–		6	–	3	–	0
Florida State		–		6	–	3	–	1
Colgate		–		5	–	3	–	1
Air Force		–		6	–	4	–	0
West Texas State		–		6	–	4	–	0
Boston College		–		5	–	4	–	0
New Mexico State		–		5	–	5	–	0
Southern Miss		–		5	–	5	–	0
Syracuse		–		5	–	5	–	0
Army		–		4	–	5	–	1
Virginia Tech		–		4	–	5	–	1
Georgia Tech		–		4	–	6	–	0
Miami (FL)		–		4	–	6	–	0
Pittsburgh		–		4	–	6	–	0
Dayton		–		3	–	7	–	0
Marshall		–		3	–	7	–	0
Northern Illinois		–		3	–	7	–	0
Tulane		–		3	–	7	–	0
Utah State		–		3	–	7	–	0
Navy		–		1	–	9	–	0
Xavier		–		1	–	9	–	0
Rankings from AP Poll

The 1969 Virginia Tech Gobblers football team represented the Virginia Polytechnic Institute or VPI (now known as Virginia Polytechnic Institute and State University or Virginia Tech) as an independent during the 1969 NCAA University Division football season. Led by ninth-year head coach Jerry Claiborne the Gobblers compiled an overall record of 4–5–1. VPI played home games at Lane Stadium in Blacksburg, Virginia.

== Schedule ==
Date	Time	Opponent	Site	Result	Attendance	Source
September 20		No. 13 Alabama	Lane Stadium; Blacksburg, VA	L 13–17	42,000	
September 27		at Wake Forest	Groves Stadium; Winston-Salem, NC	L 10–16	20,000	
October 4		at Richmond	City Stadium; Richmond, VA	L 10–17	20,000	
October 11		Kentucky	Lane Stadium; Blacksburg, VA	L 6–7	33,000	
October 18		South Carolina	Lane Stadium; Blacksburg, VA	L 16–17	28,000	
October 25	1:30 p.m.	at Buffalo	War Memorial Stadium; Buffalo, NY	W 21–7	8,354	
November 1		vs. William & Mary	Victory Stadium; Roanoke, VA (Harvest Bowl)	W 48–7	6,000	
November 8		Florida State	Lane Stadium; Blacksburg, VA	T 10–10	25,000	
November 15	1:30 p.m.	vs. Duke	Foreman Field; Norfolk, VA (Oyster Bowl)	W 48–12	23,000	
November 27		vs. VMI	Victory Stadium; Roanoke, VA (rivalry)	W 52–0	14,000	
Rankings from AP Poll released prior to the game; All times are in Eastern time

== Roster ==
The following players were members of the 1969 football team according to the roster published in the 1970 edition of The Bugle, the Virginia Tech yearbook.

VPI 1969 roster
John Harwood "Jack" Abraham; David Bailey; Preston Blackburn; Steve Bocko; Robert Clinton Bond; Tim Bosiack; Sammy Bria; Tim Chaney; Dennis Cogan; Chris Frank Collis; Jon Conlin; Donald Dewitt Cooke; Rod Cox; Larry Creekmore; J. Dee Crigger; Peter Francis Dawyot; Nick DelViscio; Kenneth Wayne Edwards; Dwight Eirich; Bob German; John Charlton Givens	Bruce Glatthorn; Jerry Green; George Butch Hall; Andy Harvey; Scott Hawkins; Bert Henderson; Ronnie Holsinger; Bob Hosp; Bill House; Wayne Humphries; Jeff Hunsucker; John Ivanac; Eddie Johns; Bob Karlsen; Al Kincaid; Larry Kushner; Lou Lagana; Dick Maksanty; Rich Matijevich; Kevin Meehan; Tom Mikulski	Bill Morgan; Thomas Irwin Parks; James Anthony Pigninelli; Jimmy Quinn; Bruce Runyan; Vince Russo; Gil Schwabe; Jack Simcsak; Bobby Slaughter; Larry Smith; Leonard James Smith; Terry Smoot; L. Wayne Stonesifer; Larry Duke Strager; Paul Christian Striffler; Don Strock; Ed Tennis; Mike Ternosky; Perry Tiberio; Joe Tucker; Mike Widger
