= 1969 Army Cadets football team =

American college football season

1969 Army Cadets football
- Conference: Independent
- Record: 4–5–1
- Head coach: Tom Cahill (4th season)
- Defensive coordinator: Richard S. Lyon (3rd season)
- Captain: Lynn Moore
- Home stadium: Michie Stadium

1969 NCAA University Division independents football records
	Conf.			Overall
Team	W	L	T	W		L		T
No. 2 Penn State		–		11	–	0	–	0
No. 17 West Virginia		–		10	–	1	–	0
No. 12 Houston		–		9	–	2	–	0
No. 5 Notre Dame		–		8	–	2	–	1
Buffalo		–		6	–	3	–	0
Rutgers		–		6	–	3	–	0
Villanova		–		6	–	3	–	0
Florida State		–		6	–	3	–	1
Colgate		–		5	–	3	–	1
Air Force		–		6	–	4	–	0
West Texas State		–		6	–	4	–	0
Boston College		–		5	–	4	–	0
New Mexico State		–		5	–	5	–	0
Southern Miss		–		5	–	5	–	0
Syracuse		–		5	–	5	–	0
Army		–		4	–	5	–	1
Virginia Tech		–		4	–	5	–	1
Georgia Tech		–		4	–	6	–	0
Miami (FL)		–		4	–	6	–	0
Pittsburgh		–		4	–	6	–	0
Dayton		–		3	–	7	–	0
Marshall		–		3	–	7	–	0
Northern Illinois		–		3	–	7	–	0
Tulane		–		3	–	7	–	0
Utah State		–		3	–	7	–	0
Navy		–		1	–	9	–	0
Xavier		–		1	–	9	–	0
Rankings from AP Poll

The 1969 Army Cadets football team represented the United States Military Academy as an independent during the 1969 NCAA University Division football season. Led by head coach Tom Cahill, the team finished with a record of 4–5–1. The Cadets offense scored 161 points, while the defense allowed 160 points.

== Schedule ==
Date	Time	Opponent	Site	Result	Attendance	Source
September 20	2:00 p.m.	New Mexico	Michie Stadium; West Point, NY	W 31–14	25,000	
September 27	8:30 p.m.	at Vanderbilt	Dudley Field; Nashville, TN	W 16–6	27,708	
October 4	2:00 p.m.	Texas A&M	Michie Stadium; West Point, NY	L 13–20	41,000	
October 11	2:00 p.m.	vs. Notre Dame	Yankee Stadium; Bronx, NY (rivalry)	L 0–45	63,786	
October 18	2:00 p.m.	Utah State	Michie Stadium; West Point, NY	L 7–23	34,000	
October 25	2:00 p.m.	Boston College	Michie Stadium; West Point, NY	W 38–7	40,557	
November 1	2:00 p.m.	No. 19 Air Force	Michie Stadium; West Point, NY (rivalry)	L 6–13	41,700	
November 8	4:30 p.m.	at Oregon	Autzen Stadium; Eugene, OR	T 17–17	36,200	
November 15	2:00 p.m.	Pittsburgh	Michie Stadium; West Point, NY	L 6–15	36,008	
November 29	1:35 p.m.	vs. Navy	John F. Kennedy Stadium; Philadelphia, PA (Army–Navy Game)	W 27–0	102,000	
Rankings from AP Poll released prior to the game; All times are in Eastern time

== Game summaries ==
=== Notre Dame ===
In 1969, Notre Dame and Army reprised their long series at Yankee Stadium. Games were played from 1925 to 1946 except 1930.

=== Navy ===
Army Cadets vs. Navy Midshipmen

Quarter	1	2	3	4	Total
Navy	0	0	0	0	0
Army	0	6	14	7	27

at JFK Stadium • Philadelphia, Pennsylvania

- Date: November 29

Game information

Navy

Army

- Lynn Moore
  40 Rush, 206 Yds, 2 TD

== Roster ==
1969 Army Cadets football team roster
Players			Coaches
Offense: Pos. / # / Name / Class; FB / / Lynn Moore / Sr	Defense: Pos. / # / Name / Class	Special teams: Pos. / # / Name / Class	Head coach: Tom Cahill; Coordinators/assistant coaches Legend: (C) Team captain; (S) Suspended; (I) Ineligible; Injured; Redshirt
