= 1969 Buffalo Bulls football team =

American college football season

1969 Buffalo Bulls football
- Conference: Independent
- Record: 6–3
- Head coach: Bob Deming (1st season)
- Defensive coordinator: Rick Lantz (2nd season)
- Captains: Paul Lang; Scott Clark
- Home stadium: Rotary Field, War Memorial Stadium

1969 NCAA University Division independents football records
	Conf.			Overall
Team	W	L	T	W		L		T
No. 2 Penn State		–		11	–	0	–	0
No. 17 West Virginia		–		10	–	1	–	0
No. 12 Houston		–		9	–	2	–	0
No. 5 Notre Dame		–		8	–	2	–	1
Buffalo		–		6	–	3	–	0
Rutgers		–		6	–	3	–	0
Villanova		–		6	–	3	–	0
Florida State		–		6	–	3	–	1
Colgate		–		5	–	3	–	1
Air Force		–		6	–	4	–	0
West Texas State		–		6	–	4	–	0
Boston College		–		5	–	4	–	0
New Mexico State		–		5	–	5	–	0
Southern Miss		–		5	–	5	–	0
Syracuse		–		5	–	5	–	0
Army		–		4	–	5	–	1
Virginia Tech		–		4	–	5	–	1
Georgia Tech		–		4	–	6	–	0
Miami (FL)		–		4	–	6	–	0
Pittsburgh		–		4	–	6	–	0
Dayton		–		3	–	7	–	0
Marshall		–		3	–	7	–	0
Northern Illinois		–		3	–	7	–	0
Tulane		–		3	–	7	–	0
Utah State		–		3	–	7	–	0
Navy		–		1	–	9	–	0
Xavier		–		1	–	9	–	0
Rankings from AP Poll

The 1969 Buffalo Bulls football team represented the University at Buffalo as an independent during the 1969 NCAA University Division football season. Led by first-year head coach Bob Deming, the Bulls compiled a record of 6–3. The team's offense scored 174 points while the defense allowed 89 points. Buffalo played four home games at Rotary Field and one at War Memorial Stadium, both located in Buffalo, New York.

== Schedule ==
Date	Time	Opponent	Site	Result	Attendance	Source
September 13		at Ball State	Ball State Stadium; Muncie, IN	L 7–10	16,112	
September 20		Xavier	Rotary Field; Buffalo, NY	W 17–0	8,468	
September 27		at UMass	Alumni Stadium; Hadley, MA (rivalry)	W 16–6	13,200	
October 4		Kent State	Rotary Field; Buffalo, NY	L 8–17	8,368	
October 11		Dayton	Rotary Field; Buffalo, NY	W 27–0	4,599	
October 18		at Holy Cross	Fitton Field; Worcester, MA	Canceled		
October 25		Virginia Tech	War Memorial Stadium; Buffalo, NY	L 7–21	8,354	
November 1	1:30 p.m.	Temple	Rotary Field; Buffalo, NY	W 33–0	7,351	
November 8	1:30 p.m.	at Boston College	Alumni Stadium; Chestnut Hill, MA	W 35–21	20,500	
November 22	1:31 p.m.	at Villanova	Villanova Stadium; Villanova, PA	W 24–14	7,825	
All times are in Eastern time

== Roster ==
1969 Buffalo Bulls football team roster
Players
Coaches
Offense

Pos.	#	Name	Class
QB	14	Mick Murtha	Sr
OT	77	Chris Wolf	Sr

Defense

Pos.	#	Name	Class

Special teams

Pos.	#	Name	Class

Head coach

- Bob Deming

Coordinators/assistant coaches

Legend

- (C) Team captain
- (S) Suspended
- (I) Ineligible
- Injured
- Redshirt
