= 1969 Air Force Falcons football team =

American college football season

1969 Air Force Falcons football
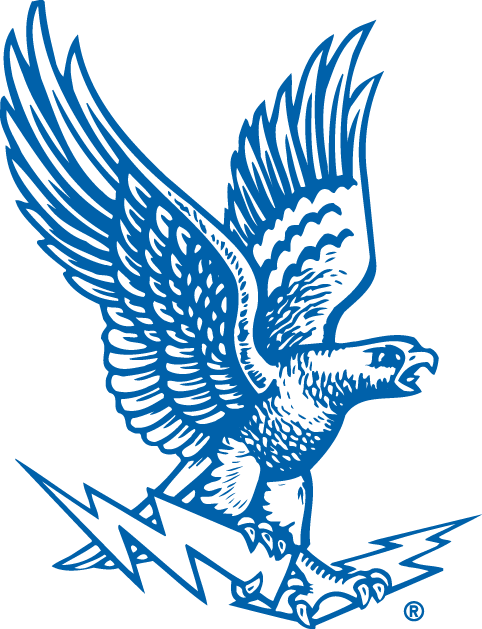
- Conference: Independent
- Record: 6–4
- Head coach: Ben Martin (12th season)
- Captains: Gary Baxter; Ed Epping
- Home stadium: Falcon Stadium

1969 NCAA University Division independents football records
	Conf.			Overall
Team	W	L	T	W		L		T
No. 2 Penn State		–		11	–	0	–	0
No. 17 West Virginia		–		10	–	1	–	0
No. 12 Houston		–		9	–	2	–	0
No. 5 Notre Dame		–		8	–	2	–	1
Buffalo		–		6	–	3	–	0
Rutgers		–		6	–	3	–	0
Villanova		–		6	–	3	–	0
Florida State		–		6	–	3	–	1
Colgate		–		5	–	3	–	1
Air Force		–		6	–	4	–	0
West Texas State		–		6	–	4	–	0
Boston College		–		5	–	4	–	0
New Mexico State		–		5	–	5	–	0
Southern Miss		–		5	–	5	–	0
Syracuse		–		5	–	5	–	0
Army		–		4	–	5	–	1
Virginia Tech		–		4	–	5	–	1
Georgia Tech		–		4	–	6	–	0
Miami (FL)		–		4	–	6	–	0
Pittsburgh		–		4	–	6	–	0
Dayton		–		3	–	7	–	0
Marshall		–		3	–	7	–	0
Northern Illinois		–		3	–	7	–	0
Tulane		–		3	–	7	–	0
Utah State		–		3	–	7	–	0
Navy		–		1	–	9	–	0
Xavier		–		1	–	9	–	0
Rankings from AP Poll

The 1969 Air Force Falcons football team represented the United States Air Force Academy as an independent during the 1969 NCAA University Division football season. Led by 12th-year head coach Ben Martin, the Falcons compiled a record of 6–4 and outscored their opponents 267–177. Air Force played their home games at Falcon Stadium in Colorado Springs, Colorado.

== Schedule ==
Date	Time	Opponent	Rank	Site	Result	Attendance	Source
September 13	7:35 p.m.	at SMU		Cotton Bowl; Dallas, TX	W 26–22	44,300	
September 20		at No. 10 Missouri		Memorial Stadium; Columbia, MO	L 17–19	55,000	
September 27	1:30 p.m.	Wyoming		Falcon Stadium; Colorado Springs, CO	L 25–27	33,290	
October 11	11:30 a.m.	at North Carolina		Kenan Memorial Stadium; Chapel Hill, NC	W 20–10	37,500	
October 18	1:30 p.m.	Oregon		Falcon Stadium; Colorado Springs, CO	W 60–13	36,820	
October 25	1:30 p.m.	Colorado State	No. 20	Falcon Stadium; Colorado Springs, CO (rivalry)	W 28–7	23,359	
November 1	12:00 p.m.	at Army	No. 19	Michie Stadium; West Point, NY (rivalry)	W 13–6	41,700	
November 8	1:00 p.m.	Utah State	No. 19	Falcon Stadium; Colorado Springs, CO	W 38–13	37,271	
November 15		at No. 13 Stanford	No. 20	Stanford Stadium; Stanford, CA	L 34–47	41,500	
November 22	11:30 a.m.	at No. 8 Notre Dame		Notre Dame Stadium; Notre Dame, IN (rivalry)	L 6–13	59,075	
Rankings from AP Poll released prior to the game; All times are in Mountain time

== Roster ==
1969 Air Force Falcons football team roster
Players
Coaches
Offense

Pos.	#	Name	Class
RB		Brian Bream	So
WR		Ernie Jennings	Jr

Defense

Pos.	#	Name	Class

Special teams

Pos.	#	Name	Class

Head coach

- Ben Martin

Coordinators/assistant coaches

Legend

- (C) Team captain
- (S) Suspended
- (I) Ineligible
- Injured
- Redshirt
