= Bob Deming =

American football player and coach, college athletics administrator

Biographical details
- Born: 1935 or 1936 (age 90–91)

Playing career
- 1955–1956: Colgate
- Position: Fullback

Coaching career (HC unless noted)
- 1959–1968: Buffalo (DB)
- 1969–1970: Buffalo
- 1973: Colgate (defensive assistant)

Administrative career (AD unless noted)
- 1970: Buffalo (interim AD)
- ?–1973: Buffalo (associate AD)
- 1973–1975: Colgate
- 1980–1997: Ithaca

Head coaching record
- Overall: 8–12

Robert C. Deming (born 1935 or 1936) is an American former college football player, coach, and athletics administrator. He served as the head football coach at the University at Buffalo in 1969 and 1970, compiling a record of 8–12. Deming was the athletic director at Ithaca College from 1980 until his retirement in 1997.

== Head coaching record ==
Year	Team	Overall	Conference	Standing	Bowl/playoffs
Buffalo Bulls (NCAA University Division independent) (1969–1970)
1969	Buffalo	6–3			
1970	Buffalo	2–9			
Buffalo:		8–12			
Total:		8–12			
