= 1969 Tulane Green Wave football team =

American college football season

1969 Tulane Green Wave football
- Conference: Independent
- Record: 3–7
- Head coach: Jim Pittman (4th season)
- Home stadium: Tulane Stadium

1969 NCAA University Division independents football records
	Conf.			Overall
Team	W	L	T	W		L		T
No. 2 Penn State		–		11	–	0	–	0
No. 17 West Virginia		–		10	–	1	–	0
No. 12 Houston		–		9	–	2	–	0
No. 5 Notre Dame		–		8	–	2	–	1
Buffalo		–		6	–	3	–	0
Rutgers		–		6	–	3	–	0
Villanova		–		6	–	3	–	0
Florida State		–		6	–	3	–	1
Colgate		–		5	–	3	–	1
Air Force		–		6	–	4	–	0
West Texas State		–		6	–	4	–	0
Boston College		–		5	–	4	–	0
New Mexico State		–		5	–	5	–	0
Southern Miss		–		5	–	5	–	0
Syracuse		–		5	–	5	–	0
Army		–		4	–	5	–	1
Virginia Tech		–		4	–	5	–	1
Georgia Tech		–		4	–	6	–	0
Miami (FL)		–		4	–	6	–	0
Pittsburgh		–		4	–	6	–	0
Dayton		–		3	–	7	–	0
Marshall		–		3	–	7	–	0
Northern Illinois		–		3	–	7	–	0
Tulane		–		3	–	7	–	0
Utah State		–		3	–	7	–	0
Navy		–		1	–	9	–	0
Xavier		–		1	–	9	–	0
Rankings from AP Poll

The 1969 Tulane Green Wave football team was an American football team that represented Tulane University as an independent during the 1969 NCAA University Division football season. In its fourth year under head coach Jim Pittman, Tulane compiled a 3–7 record and was outscored by a total of 235 to 152.

The team gained an average of 136.4 rushing yards and 143.4 passing yards per game. On defense, it gave up an average of 193.3 rushing yards and 164.0 passing yards per game. Tulane's individual statistical leaders included quarterback Rusty Lachaussee with 1,291 passing yards, Jim Batey with 320 rushing yards, and Maxie LeBlanc with 420 receiving yards.

The team played its home games at Tulane Stadium in New Orleans.

== Schedule ==
Date	Opponent	Site	Result	Attendance	Source
September 20	at No. 8 Georgia	Sanford Stadium; Athens, GA	L 0–35	55,235	
September 27	West Virginia	Tulane Stadium; New Orleans, LA	L 17–35	20,000	
October 4	at Boston College	Alumni Stadium; Chestnut Hill, MA	L 24–28	15,500	
October 11	vs. No. 12 Florida	Tampa Stadium; Tampa, FL	L 17–18	43,102	
October 18	at Pittsburgh	Pitt Stadium; Pittsburgh, PA	W 26–22	23,784	
October 25	No. 12 Notre Dame	Tulane Stadium; New Orleans, LA	L 0–37	40,250	
November 1	Vanderbilt	Tulane Stadium; New Orleans, LA	L 23–26	8,675	
November 8	Georgia Tech	Tulane Stadium; New Orleans, LA	W 14–7	19,450	
November 15	Virginia	Tulane Stadium; New Orleans, LA	W 31–0	9,650	
November 22	at No. 10 LSU	Tiger Stadium; Baton Rouge, LA (Battle for the Rag)	L 0–27	67,000	
Rankings from AP Poll released prior to the game
