= 1969 Florida State Seminoles football team =

American college football season

1969 Florida State Seminoles football
- Conference: Independent
- Record: 6–3–1
- Head coach: Bill Peterson (10th season)
- Offensive scheme: Pro set
- Defensive coordinator: Bob Harbison (4th season)
- Base defense: 4–3
- Captain: Game captains
- Home stadium: Doak Campbell Stadium

1969 NCAA University Division independents football records
	Conf.			Overall
Team	W	L	T	W		L		T
No. 2 Penn State		–		11	–	0	–	0
No. 17 West Virginia		–		10	–	1	–	0
No. 12 Houston		–		9	–	2	–	0
No. 5 Notre Dame		–		8	–	2	–	1
Buffalo		–		6	–	3	–	0
Rutgers		–		6	–	3	–	0
Villanova		–		6	–	3	–	0
Florida State		–		6	–	3	–	1
Colgate		–		5	–	3	–	1
Air Force		–		6	–	4	–	0
West Texas State		–		6	–	4	–	0
Boston College		–		5	–	4	–	0
New Mexico State		–		5	–	5	–	0
Southern Miss		–		5	–	5	–	0
Syracuse		–		5	–	5	–	0
Army		–		4	–	5	–	1
Virginia Tech		–		4	–	5	–	1
Georgia Tech		–		4	–	6	–	0
Miami (FL)		–		4	–	6	–	0
Pittsburgh		–		4	–	6	–	0
Dayton		–		3	–	7	–	0
Marshall		–		3	–	7	–	0
Northern Illinois		–		3	–	7	–	0
Tulane		–		3	–	7	–	0
Utah State		–		3	–	7	–	0
Navy		–		1	–	9	–	0
Xavier		–		1	–	9	–	0
Rankings from AP Poll

The 1969 Florida State Seminoles football team represented Florida State University as an independent during the 1969 NCAA University Division football season. This was Bill Peterson's tenth year as head coach, and he led the team to an 6–3–1 record.

== Schedule ==
Date	Time	Opponent	Site	TV	Result	Attendance	Source
September 20	7:33 p.m.	Wichita State	Doak Campbell Stadium; Tallahassee, FL		W 24–0	31,821	
September 26	8:13 p.m.	at Miami (FL)	Miami Orange Bowl; Miami, FL (rivalry)		W 16–14	55,478	
October 4		at No. 12 Florida	Florida Field; Gainesville, FL (rivalry)		L 6–21	63,957	
October 18		at Tulsa	Skelly Stadium; Tulsa, OK		W 38–20	16,500	
October 25		Mississippi State^{†}	Doak Campbell Stadium; Tallahassee, FL		W 20–17	33,011	
November 1		South Carolina	Doak Campbell Stadium; Tallahassee, FL		W 34–9	34,519	
November 8		at Virginia Tech	Lane Stadium; Blacksburg, VA		T 10–10	25,000	
November 15	7:29 p.m.	Memphis State	Doak Campbell Stadium; Tallahassee, FL		L 26–28	28,532	
November 22		NC State	Doak Campbell Stadium; Tallahassee, FL	ABC	W 33–22	25,343	
November 29		at No. 18 Houston	Houston Astrodome; Houston, TX		L 13–41	36,508–36,548	
^{†}Homecoming; Rankings from AP Poll released prior to the game; All times are in Eastern time

== Roster ==
- QB No. 14 Bill Cappleman, Sr.
