= 1969 Syracuse Orangemen football team =

American college football season

1969 Syracuse Orangemen football
- Conference: Independent
- Record: 5–5
- Head coach: Ben Schwartzwalder (21st season)
- Captain: Game captains
- Home stadium: Archbold Stadium

1969 NCAA University Division independents football records
| | Conf. | | | Overall |
| Team | W | L | T | W | | L | | T |
|---|---|---|---|---|---|---|---|---|
| No. 2 Penn State | | – | | 11 | – | 0 | – | 0 |
| No. 17 West Virginia | | – | | 10 | – | 1 | – | 0 |
| No. 12 Houston | | – | | 9 | – | 2 | – | 0 |
| No. 5 Notre Dame | | – | | 8 | – | 2 | – | 1 |
| Buffalo | | – | | 6 | – | 3 | – | 0 |
| Rutgers | | – | | 6 | – | 3 | – | 0 |
| Villanova | | – | | 6 | – | 3 | – | 0 |
| Florida State | | – | | 6 | – | 3 | – | 1 |
| Colgate | | – | | 5 | – | 3 | – | 1 |
| Air Force | | – | | 6 | – | 4 | – | 0 |
| West Texas State | | – | | 6 | – | 4 | – | 0 |
| Boston College | | – | | 5 | – | 4 | – | 0 |
| New Mexico State | | – | | 5 | – | 5 | – | 0 |
| Southern Miss | | – | | 5 | – | 5 | – | 0 |
| Syracuse | | – | | 5 | – | 5 | – | 0 |
| Army | | – | | 4 | – | 5 | – | 1 |
| Virginia Tech | | – | | 4 | – | 5 | – | 1 |
| Georgia Tech | | – | | 4 | – | 6 | – | 0 |
| Miami (FL) | | – | | 4 | – | 6 | – | 0 |
| Pittsburgh | | – | | 4 | – | 6 | – | 0 |
| Dayton | | – | | 3 | – | 7 | – | 0 |
| Marshall | | – | | 3 | – | 7 | – | 0 |
| Northern Illinois | | – | | 3 | – | 7 | – | 0 |
| Tulane | | – | | 3 | – | 7 | – | 0 |
| Utah State | | – | | 3 | – | 7 | – | 0 |
| Navy | | – | | 1 | – | 9 | – | 0 |
| Xavier | | – | | 1 | – | 9 | – | 0 |
Rankings from AP Poll

The 1969 Syracuse Orangemen football team represented Syracuse University as an independent during the 1969 NCAA University Division football season. The team was led by 21st-year head coach Ben Schwartzwalder and played their home games at Archbold Stadium in Syracuse, New York. Syracuse ended the season with a record of 5–5 and were not invited to a bowl game.

== Schedule ==
| Date | Time | Opponent | Site | Result | Attendance | Source |
|---|---|---|---|---|---|---|
| September 20 | | Iowa State | Archbold Stadium; Syracuse, NY | W 14–13 | 30,491 | |
| September 27 | | at Kansas | Memorial Stadium; Lawrence, KS | L 0–13 | 44,500 | |
| October 4 | | at Wisconsin | Camp Randall Stadium; Madison, WI | W 43–7 | 45,540 | |
| October 11 | | at Maryland | Byrd Stadium; College Park, MD | W 20–9 | 23,400 | |
| October 18 | | No. 5 Penn State^{†} | Archbold Stadium; Syracuse, NY (rivalry) | L 14–15 | 42,491 | |
| November 1 | | at Pittsburgh | Pitt Stadium; Pittsburgh, PA (rivalry) | L 20–21 | 20,882 | |
| November 8 | | Arizona | Archbold Stadium; Syracuse, NY | W 23–0 | 24,346 | |
| November 15 | 1:30 p.m. | at Navy | Navy–Marine Corps Memorial Stadium; Annapolis, MD | W 15–0 | 20,215 | |
| November 22 | | No. 18 West Virginia | Archbold Stadium; Syracuse, NY (rivalry) | L 10–13 | 21,409 | |
| November 29 | | Boston College | Archbold Stadium; Syracuse, NY | L 10–35 | 15,119 | |
^{†}Homecoming; Rankings from AP Poll released prior to the game; All times are in Eastern time

== Roster ==
1969 Syracuse Orangemen football team roster
Players
Coaches
Offense

| Pos. | # | Name | Class |
|---|---|---|---|
| RB | 36 | Marty Januszkiewicz | So |
| OT | 71 | Stan Walters | So |

Defense

| Pos. | # | Name | Class |
|---|---|---|---|
| DT | 76 | Joe Ehrmann | So |
| DB | 20 | Tom Myers | So |
| LB | 50 | Jack Portz | Sr |
| OT | 96 | Dan Yochum | So |

Special teams

| Pos. | # | Name | Class |
|---|---|---|---|
| K | 3 | George Jakowenko | Jr |

Head coach

- Ben Schwartzwalder

Coordinators/assistant coaches

Legend

- (C) Team captain
- (S) Suspended
- (I) Ineligible
- Injured
- Redshirt
