= Irvin A. Etler =

American football player and coach (1931–2020)

Biographical details
- Born: November 4, 1935; Covington, Kentucky, U.S.
- Died: February 16, 2010 (aged 74); Greenhills, Ohio, U.S.

Playing career
- 1956–1959: Xavier
- Position: Quarterback

Coaching career (HC unless noted)
- 1963–1964: Xavier (freshmen)
- 1965–1968: Xavier (DC)
- 1969: Xavier

Head coaching record
- Overall: 1–9

Irvin A. Etler Jr. (November 4, 1935 – February 10, 2010) was an American college football coach and entrepreneur. Born in Covington, Kentucky, Etler was a graduate of Erlanger High School. After high school, Etler attended Xavier University and played quarterback for the Musketeers from 1956 to 1959.

Upon graduation Etler served in the Marines before joining the coaching staff at Xavier in 1963 as the head coach of the freshman squad. He then served as defensive coordinator for four years before his promotion to head coach in January 1969. In his lone season as head coach, Etler led Xavier to a 1–9 record and resigned from the program in December 1969.

After his coaching career, Etler was an insurance agent and owner of Etler-Kettenacker Insurance Agency of Cincinnati.

== Head coaching record ==
Year	Team	Overall	Conference	Standing	Bowl/playoffs
Xavier Musketeers (NCAA University Division independent) (1969)
1970	Xavier	1–9			
Xavier:		1–9			
Total:		1–9			
