= 1969 Miami Hurricanes football team =

American college football season

1969 Miami Hurricanes football
- Conference: Independent
- Record: 4–6
- Head coach: Charlie Tate (6th season)
- MVP: Dick Sorensen
- Home stadium: Miami Orange Bowl

1969 NCAA University Division independents football records
	Conf.			Overall
Team	W	L	T	W		L		T
No. 2 Penn State		–		11	–	0	–	0
No. 17 West Virginia		–		10	–	1	–	0
No. 12 Houston		–		9	–	2	–	0
No. 5 Notre Dame		–		8	–	2	–	1
Buffalo		–		6	–	3	–	0
Rutgers		–		6	–	3	–	0
Villanova		–		6	–	3	–	0
Florida State		–		6	–	3	–	1
Colgate		–		5	–	3	–	1
Air Force		–		6	–	4	–	0
West Texas State		–		6	–	4	–	0
Boston College		–		5	–	4	–	0
New Mexico State		–		5	–	5	–	0
Southern Miss		–		5	–	5	–	0
Syracuse		–		5	–	5	–	0
Army		–		4	–	5	–	1
Virginia Tech		–		4	–	5	–	1
Georgia Tech		–		4	–	6	–	0
Miami (FL)		–		4	–	6	–	0
Pittsburgh		–		4	–	6	–	0
Dayton		–		3	–	7	–	0
Marshall		–		3	–	7	–	0
Northern Illinois		–		3	–	7	–	0
Tulane		–		3	–	7	–	0
Utah State		–		3	–	7	–	0
Navy		–		1	–	9	–	0
Xavier		–		1	–	9	–	0
Rankings from AP Poll

The 1969 Miami Hurricanes football team represented the University of Miami as an independent during the 1969 NCAA University Division football season. Led by sixth-year head coach Charlie Tate, the Hurricanes played their home games at the Miami Orange Bowl in Miami, Florida. Miami finished the season with a record of 4–6.

== Schedule ==
Date	Time	Opponent	Site	Result	Attendance	Source
September 26	8:13 p.m.	Florida State	Miami Orange Bowl; Miami, FL (rivalry)	L 14–16	55,478	
October 3	8:14 p.m.	NC State	Miami Orange Bowl; Miami, FL	W 23–13	37,038	
October 10	8:15 p.m.	No. 14 LSU	Miami Orange Bowl; Miami, FL	L 0–20	41,972	
October 18		at Memphis State	Memphis Memorial Stadium; Memphis, TN	L 13–26	28,506	
October 24	8:15 p.m.	TCU	Miami Orange Bowl; Miami, FL	W 14–9	21,195	
November 1		at Houston	Houston Astrodome; Houston, TX	L 36–38	25,498	
November 7	8:14 p.m.	Navy	Miami Orange Bowl; Miami, FL	W 30–10	37,972	
November 15		at Alabama	Denny Stadium; Tuscaloosa, AL	L 6–42	57,596	
November 21	8:15 p.m.	Wake Forest	Miami Orange Bowl; Miami, FL	W 49–7	24,817	
November 29	8:01 p.m.	Florida	Miami Orange Bowl; Miami, FL (rivalry)	L 16–35	70,934	
Rankings from AP Poll released prior to the game; All times are in Eastern time

== Roster ==
- Vince Opalsky, Sr.
- Chuck Whelpley
