= 1969 Houston Cougars football team =

American college football season

1969 Houston Cougars football
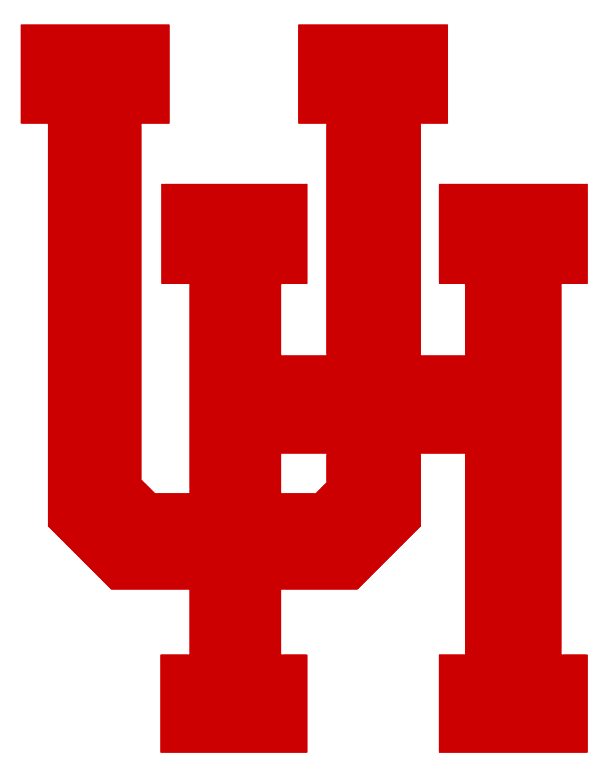

Astro-Bluebonnet Bowl champion

Astro-Bluebonnet Bowl, W 36–7 vs. Auburn
- Conference: Independent

Ranking
- Coaches: No. 16
- AP: No. 12
- Record: 9–2
- Head coach: Bill Yeoman (8th season)
- Offensive scheme: Houston Veer
- Defensive coordinator: Melvin Robertson (5th season)
- Captains: Jim Strong; Jerry Drones
- Home stadium: Astrodome

1969 NCAA University Division independents football records
	Conf.			Overall
Team	W	L	T	W		L		T
No. 2 Penn State		–		11	–	0	–	0
No. 17 West Virginia		–		10	–	1	–	0
No. 12 Houston		–		9	–	2	–	0
No. 5 Notre Dame		–		8	–	2	–	1
Buffalo		–		6	–	3	–	0
Rutgers		–		6	–	3	–	0
Villanova		–		6	–	3	–	0
Florida State		–		6	–	3	–	1
Colgate		–		5	–	3	–	1
Air Force		–		6	–	4	–	0
West Texas State		–		6	–	4	–	0
Boston College		–		5	–	4	–	0
New Mexico State		–		5	–	5	–	0
Southern Miss		–		5	–	5	–	0
Syracuse		–		5	–	5	–	0
Army		–		4	–	5	–	1
Virginia Tech		–		4	–	5	–	1
Georgia Tech		–		4	–	6	–	0
Miami (FL)		–		4	–	6	–	0
Pittsburgh		–		4	–	6	–	0
Dayton		–		3	–	7	–	0
Marshall		–		3	–	7	–	0
Northern Illinois		–		3	–	7	–	0
Tulane		–		3	–	7	–	0
Utah State		–		3	–	7	–	0
Navy		–		1	–	9	–	0
Xavier		–		1	–	9	–	0
Rankings from AP Poll

The 1969 Houston Cougars football team, also known as the Houston Cougars, Houston, or UH, represented the University of Houston in the 1969 NCAA University Division football season. It was the 24th year of season play for Houston. The team was coached by eighth-year head coach Bill Yeoman who was inducted into the College Football Hall of Fame in 2001. The team played its home games in the Astrodome, a 53,000-person capacity stadium off-campus in Houston. Houston competed as a member of the NCAA in the University Division, independent of any athletic conference. It was their tenth year of doing so. After completion of the regular season, the Cougars were invited to the Astro-Bluebonnet Bowl, where they defeated the Auburn Tigers. Following the overall season, several players were selected for the 1970 NFL draft.

== Schedule ==
Date	Opponent	Rank	Site	TV	Result	Attendance	Source
September 20	at Florida	No. 7	Florida Field; Gainesville, FL		L 34–59	53,807	
September 27	at Oklahoma State		Lewis Field; Stillwater, OK		L 18–24	23,500	
October 4	Mississippi State		Houston Astrodome; Houston, TX		W 74–0	36,207	
October 11	at Arizona		Arizona Stadium; Tucson, AZ		W 34–17	32,800	
October 25	No. 17 Ole Miss^{†}		Houston Astrodome; Houston, TX		W 25–11	48,049	
November 1	Miami (FL)		Houston Astrodome; Houston, TX	ABC	W 38–36	25,498	
November 8	at Tulsa		Skelly Stadium; Tulsa, OK		W 47–14	17,750	
November 15	at NC State	No. 18	Carter–Finley Stadium; Raleigh, NC		W 34–13	31,000	
November 22	Wyoming	No. 19	Houston Astrodome; Houston, TX		W 41–14	35,389	
November 29	Florida State	No. 18	Houston Astrodome; Houston, TX		W 41–13	36,508–36,548	
December 31	vs. No. 12 Auburn	No. 17	Houston Astrodome; Houston, TX (Astro-Bluebonnet Bowl)	HTN	W 36–7	55,203	
^{†}Homecoming; Rankings from AP Poll released prior to the game

== Rankings ==
Week-to-week rankings Legend: ██ Increase in ranking. ██ Decrease in ranking. ██ Not ranked the previous week.
Poll	Pre	Wk 1	Wk 2	Wk 3	Wk 4	Wk 5	Wk 6	Wk 7	Wk 8	Wk 9	Wk 10	Wk 11	Wk 12	Final
AP	7	NR	NR	NR	NR	NR	NR	NR	18	19	18	19	17	12

== Preseason ==
=== Top 25 rankings ===
Houston was nationally ranked in the AP poll for the preseason with the No. 7 spot. It was the first time that Houston had received votes in the pre-season for that poll since the 1953 season, and was the highest pre-season ranking for the team ever. Outside of the 1967 season, it was the highest that Houston had ever been ranked in the poll.

== Game summaries ==
=== Florida ===
Houston opened the 1969 season ranked as #7 in the Pre-season AP Poll. For its first game, the team traveled to Gainesville, Florida to compete against Florida of the Southeastern Conference at Florida Field. Led by tenth-year head coach Ray Graves, Florida had not lost a season opener for the past three years, while Houston had not lost a season opener for the past four years. It was the first time in history that the two teams had met. The victory by the Gators was considered a major upset, as the #7-ranked Houston quickly fell to an unranked position following the game, while Florida rose to #12 in the AP Poll. Following the game, Florida eventually went on to earn a 9–1–1 overall record, and after the defeat of Tennessee in the Gator Bowl, a #14 national ranking the poll to finish the season.

== Coaching staff ==
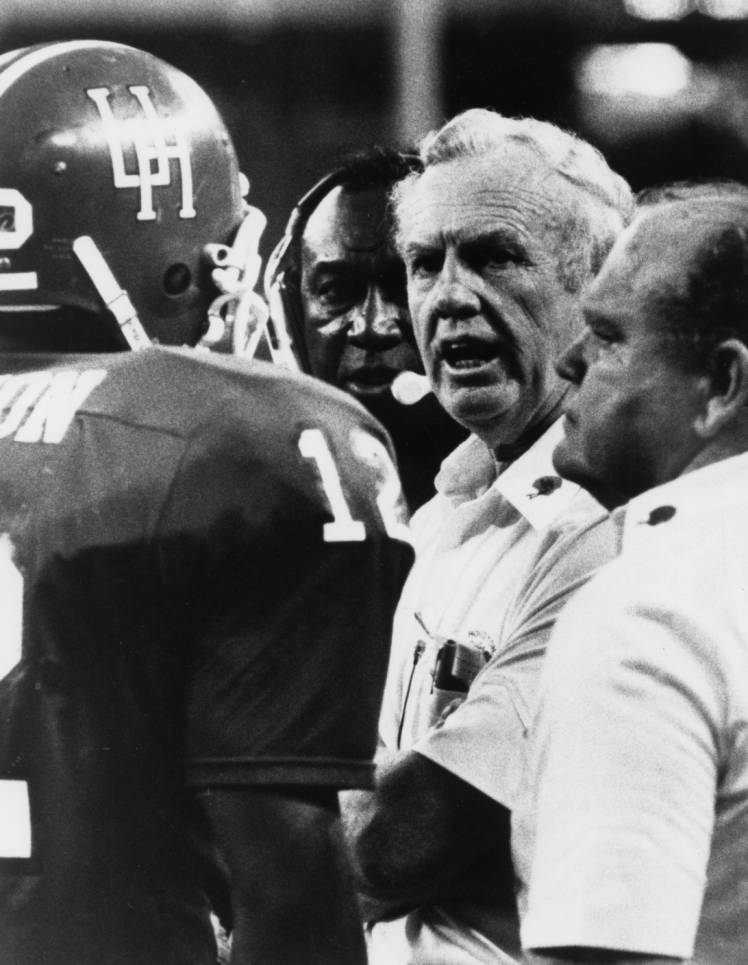
Head coach Bill Yeoman coaches Houston

Name	Position	Alma mater (year)	Year at Houston
Bill Yeoman	Head coach, offensive coordinator	Army (1948)	7th
Melvin Robertson	Defensive coordinator	West Texas State (1950)	5th
Melvin Brown	Offensive backs coach	Oklahoma (1954)	8th
Billy Willingham	Offensive line coach	TCU (1951)	4th
Barry Sides	Offensive line coach, defensive ends coach	Houston (1968)	1st
Ben Hurt	Defensive line coach	Middle Tennessee (1957)	5th
Howard Tippett	Linebackers coach	East Tennessee State (1958)	3rd
Joe Arenas	Wide receivers coach	Omaha (1951)	7th
Carroll Schultz	Freshmen coach	Louisiana Tech (1948)	8th
Bobby Baldwin	Freshmen coach	Houston (1958)	5th
