= 1969 Boston College Eagles football team =

American college football season

1969 Boston College Eagles football
- Conference: Independent
- Record: 5–4
- Head coach: Joe Yukica (2nd season)
- Defensive coordinator: John Petercuskie (1st season)
- Captain: Jim McCool
- Home stadium: Alumni Stadium

1969 NCAA University Division independents football records
	Conf.			Overall
Team	W	L	T	W		L		T
No. 2 Penn State		–		11	–	0	–	0
No. 17 West Virginia		–		10	–	1	–	0
No. 12 Houston		–		9	–	2	–	0
No. 5 Notre Dame		–		8	–	2	–	1
Buffalo		–		6	–	3	–	0
Rutgers		–		6	–	3	–	0
Villanova		–		6	–	3	–	0
Florida State		–		6	–	3	–	1
Colgate		–		5	–	3	–	1
Air Force		–		6	–	4	–	0
West Texas State		–		6	–	4	–	0
Boston College		–		5	–	4	–	0
New Mexico State		–		5	–	5	–	0
Southern Miss		–		5	–	5	–	0
Syracuse		–		5	–	5	–	0
Army		–		4	–	5	–	1
Virginia Tech		–		4	–	5	–	1
Georgia Tech		–		4	–	6	–	0
Miami (FL)		–		4	–	6	–	0
Pittsburgh		–		4	–	6	–	0
Dayton		–		3	–	7	–	0
Marshall		–		3	–	7	–	0
Northern Illinois		–		3	–	7	–	0
Tulane		–		3	–	7	–	0
Utah State		–		3	–	7	–	0
Navy		–		1	–	9	–	0
Xavier		–		1	–	9	–	0
Rankings from AP Poll

The 1969 Boston College Eagles football team represented Boston College as an independent during the 1969 NCAA University Division football season. Led by second-year head coach Joe Yukica, the Eagles compiled a record of 5–4. Boston College played home games at Alumni Stadium in Chestnut Hill, Massachusetts.

== Schedule ==
Date	Time	Opponent	Site	Result	Attendance	Source
September 27	1:30 p.m.	Navy	Alumni Stadium; Chestnut Hill, MA	W 21–14	24,200	
October 4		Tulane	Alumni Stadium; Chestnut Hill, MA	W 28–24	15,500	
October 18		Villanova	Alumni Stadium; Chestnut Hill, MA	L 6–24	23,200	
October 25	2:00 p.m.	at Army	Michie Stadium; West Point, NY	L 7–38	40,557	
November 1		at No. 5 Penn State	Beaver Stadium; University Park, PA	L 16–38	48,532	
November 8	1:30 p.m.	Buffalo	Alumni Stadium; Chestnut Hill, MA	L 21–35	20,500	
November 15		VMI	Alumni Stadium; Chestnut Hill, MA	W 49–32	11,400	
November 22		UMass	Alumni Stadium; Chestnut Hill, MA (rivalry)	W 35–30	20,500	
November 29		at Syracuse	Archbold Stadium; Syracuse, NY	W 35–10	15,119	
Rankings from AP Poll released prior to the game; All times are in Eastern time

== Personnel ==
=== Coaching staff ===
Position	Name	First Year at BC
Head coach	Joe Yukica	1968
Defensive line	John Petercuskie	1969
Offensive Line	Bill Bowes	1968
Defensive backs	Pete Carmichael	1968
Defensive ends / linebackers	Bill Campbell	1968
Offensive backfield	Jack Bicknell	1968
Freshmen	Joe Daniels	1968
Assistant freshmen	Barry Gallup	1969

=== Roster ===
1969 Boston College Eagles football team roster
Players
Coaches
Offense

Pos.	#	Name	Class
WR	81	John Bonistalli	Jr
OT	70	Bob Bouley	Sr
OT	79	John Brennan	Sr
RB	25	Jim Catone	Jr
G	63	Walt Cullen	Sr
WR	21	George Gill	Jr
QB	17	Frank Harris	Jr
TE	83	Jim O'Shea	Jr
RB	27	Bill Thomas	So
RB	33	Fred Willis	Jr

Defense

Pos.	#	Name	Class
DB	38	Bill Balmat	Jr
DB	20	Gary Dancewicz	Jr
LB	59	Mondell Davis	Sr
DT	76	John Fitzgerald	Sr
LB	50	Jim McCool	Sr

Special teams

Pos.	#	Name	Class

Head coach

- Joe Yukica

Coordinators/assistant coaches

Legend

- (C) Team captain
- (S) Suspended
- (I) Ineligible
- Injured
- Redshirt
