= 1969 Pittsburgh Panthers football team =

American college football season

1969 Pittsburgh Panthers football
- Conference: Independent
- Record: 4–6
- Head coach: Carl DePasqua (1st season)
- Offensive coordinator: Lou Cecconi (1st season)
- Home stadium: Pitt Stadium

1969 NCAA University Division independents football records
	Conf.			Overall
Team	W	L	T	W		L		T
No. 2 Penn State		–		11	–	0	–	0
No. 17 West Virginia		–		10	–	1	–	0
No. 12 Houston		–		9	–	2	–	0
No. 5 Notre Dame		–		8	–	2	–	1
Buffalo		–		6	–	3	–	0
Rutgers		–		6	–	3	–	0
Villanova		–		6	–	3	–	0
Florida State		–		6	–	3	–	1
Colgate		–		5	–	3	–	1
Air Force		–		6	–	4	–	0
West Texas State		–		6	–	4	–	0
Boston College		–		5	–	4	–	0
New Mexico State		–		5	–	5	–	0
Southern Miss		–		5	–	5	–	0
Syracuse		–		5	–	5	–	0
Army		–		4	–	5	–	1
Virginia Tech		–		4	–	5	–	1
Georgia Tech		–		4	–	6	–	0
Miami (FL)		–		4	–	6	–	0
Pittsburgh		–		4	–	6	–	0
Dayton		–		3	–	7	–	0
Marshall		–		3	–	7	–	0
Northern Illinois		–		3	–	7	–	0
Tulane		–		3	–	7	–	0
Utah State		–		3	–	7	–	0
Navy		–		1	–	9	–	0
Xavier		–		1	–	9	–	0
Rankings from AP Poll

The 1969 Pittsburgh Panthers football team represented the University of Pittsburgh as an independent during the 1969 NCAA University Division football season. The team compiled a 4–6 record in its first year under head coach Carl DePasqua. The team's statistical leaders included Jim Friedl with 1,277 passing yards and Tony Esposito with 743 rushing yards.

== Schedule ==
Date	Time	Opponent	Site	Result	Attendance	Source
September 20		at No. 17 UCLA	Los Angeles Memorial Coliseum; Los Angeles, CA	L 8–42	35,258	
September 27		at No. 6 Oklahoma	Oklahoma Memorial Stadium; Norman, OK	L 8–37	56,600	
October 4		at Duke	Wallace Wade Stadium; Durham, NC	W 14–12	18,000	
October 11	1:30 p.m.	Navy	Pitt Stadium; Pittsburgh, PA	W 46–19	23,880	
October 18		Tulane	Pitt Stadium; Pittsburgh, PA	L 22–26	23,784	
October 25		at West Virginia	Mountaineer Field; Morgantown, WV (Backyard Brawl)	L 18–49	35,500	
November 1		Syracuse	Pitt Stadium; Pittsburgh, PA (rivalry)	W 21–20	20,882	
November 8		No. 8 Notre Dame	Pitt Stadium; Pittsburgh, PA (rivalry)	L 7-49	44,084	
November 15	2:00 p.m.	at Army	Michie Stadium; West Point, NY	W 15–6	36,008	
November 22		No. 4 Penn State	Pitt Stadium; Pittsburgh, PA (rivalry)	L 7-27	39,517	
Rankings from AP Poll released prior to the game; All times are in Eastern time

== Roster ==
1969 Pittsburgh Panthers football team roster
Players
Coaches
Offense

Pos.	#	Name	Class
G	62	Warren Allen	Sr
TE	81	Bob Baierl	Jr
FB	45	Tony Esposito	Jr
RB	22	Denny Ferris	Jr
RB	33	Dave Garnett	Jr
QB	17	Dave Havern	Jr
RB	30	J. D. Lewis	Jr
C	56	Dave Magyar	Sr
WR	13	Joe McCain	Sr
TE	85	Doc Medich	Sr
FB	46	Phil Sgrignoli	Jr
QB	14	Chuck Winters	Sr

Defense

Pos.	#	Name	Class
DB	11	Jeff Barr	Sr
LB	47	Jeff Brown	Sr
LB	50	Ralph Cindrich	Jr
LB	21	Charlie Hall	Jr
DT	68	Bruce Harkiewicz	Jr
DB	20	Bryant Salter	Jr
DE	66	Lloyd Weston	Jr

Special teams

Pos.	#	Name	Class

Head coach

- Carl DePasqua

Coordinators/assistant coaches

Legend

- (C) Team captain
- (S) Suspended
- (I) Ineligible
- Injured
- Redshirt
