= 1969 West Virginia Mountaineers football team =

American college football season

1969 West Virginia Mountaineers football

Peach Bowl champion

Peach Bowl, W 14–3 vs. South Carolina
- Conference: Independent

Ranking
- Coaches: No. 18
- AP: No. 17
- Record: 10–1
- Head coach: Jim Carlen (4th season)
- Defensive coordinator: Richard Bell (2nd season)
- Home stadium: Mountaineer Field

1969 NCAA University Division independents football records
	Conf.			Overall
Team	W	L	T	W		L		T
No. 2 Penn State		–		11	–	0	–	0
No. 17 West Virginia		–		10	–	1	–	0
No. 12 Houston		–		9	–	2	–	0
No. 5 Notre Dame		–		8	–	2	–	1
Buffalo		–		6	–	3	–	0
Rutgers		–		6	–	3	–	0
Villanova		–		6	–	3	–	0
Florida State		–		6	–	3	–	1
Colgate		–		5	–	3	–	1
Air Force		–		6	–	4	–	0
West Texas State		–		6	–	4	–	0
Boston College		–		5	–	4	–	0
New Mexico State		–		5	–	5	–	0
Southern Miss		–		5	–	5	–	0
Syracuse		–		5	–	5	–	0
Army		–		4	–	5	–	1
Virginia Tech		–		4	–	5	–	1
Georgia Tech		–		4	–	6	–	0
Miami (FL)		–		4	–	6	–	0
Pittsburgh		–		4	–	6	–	0
Dayton		–		3	–	7	–	0
Marshall		–		3	–	7	–	0
Northern Illinois		–		3	–	7	–	0
Tulane		–		3	–	7	–	0
Utah State		–		3	–	7	–	0
Navy		–		1	–	9	–	0
Xavier		–		1	–	9	–	0
Rankings from AP Poll

The 1969 West Virginia Mountaineers football team represented West Virginia University in the 1969 NCAA University Division football season. West Virginia completed the regular season with a 9–1 record and traveled to the Peach Bowl, where they beat the South Carolina Gamecocks, 14–3. They finished with a ranking of 17 in the AP Poll and 18 in the Coaches Poll.

== Schedule ==
Date	Time	Opponent	Rank	Site	Result	Attendance	Source
September 13	1:25 p.m.	Cincinnati		Mountaineer Field; Morgantown, WV	W 57–11	31,500	
September 20		Maryland		Mountaineer Field; Morgantown, WV (rivalry)	W 31–7	31,000	
September 27		at Tulane		Tulane Stadium; New Orleans, LA	W 35–17	20,000	
October 4		VMI	No. 18	Mountaineer Field; Morgantown, WV	W 32–0	28,500	
October 11		at No. 5 Penn State	No. 17	Beaver Stadium; University Park, PA (rivalry)	L 0–20	52,072	
October 25		Pittsburgh		Mountaineer Field; Morgantown, WV (Backyard Brawl)	W 49–18	35,500	
November 1		at Kentucky		McLean Stadium; Lexington, KY	W 7–6	37,500	
November 8		at William & Mary		Cary Field; Williamsburg, VA	W 31–0	7,000	
November 15		Richmond		Mountaineer Field; Morgantown, WV	W 33–21	21,500	
November 22		at Syracuse	No. 18	Archbold Stadium; Syracuse, NY (rivalry)	W 13–10	21,409	
December 30		vs. South Carolina	No. 19	Grant Field; Atlanta, GA (Peach Bowl)	W 14–3	48,452	
Rankings from AP Poll released prior to the game; All times are in Eastern time

== Roster ==
1969 West Virginia Mountaineers football team roster
Players
Coaches
Offense

Pos.	#	Name	Class
QB	11	Dick Ward	Jr
QB	14	Mike Sherwood	Jr
RB	33	Bob Gresham	Jr
RB	44	Jim Braxton	Jr
WR	87	Lew Schooles	Sr
WR	88	Oscar Patrick	Sr
WR	89	Jim Smith	Sr

Defense

Pos.	#	Name	Class
DB	20	Thad Kucherawy	Sr
DB	21	Leon Jenkins	So
DB	22	Ron Pobolish	Sr
DB	24	Mike Slater	Jr
DB	25	Terry Snively	Sr
DB	28	Mike Gillespie	Jr
LB	50	Dale Farley	Jr
DT	51	Carl Crennel	Sr
LB	54	Marvin Six	Sr
LB	55	Danny Smith	Jr
DE	82	John Hale	Jr

Special teams

Pos.	#	Name	Class

Head coach

- Jim Carlen

Coordinators/assistant coaches

Legend

- (C) Team captain
- (S) Suspended
- (I) Ineligible
- Injured
- Redshirt
