= 1969 New Mexico State Aggies football team =

American college football season

1969 New Mexico State Aggies football
- Conference: Independent
- Record: 5–5
- Head coach: Jim Wood (2nd season)
- Home stadium: Memorial Stadium

1969 NCAA University Division independents football records
	Conf.			Overall
Team	W	L	T	W		L		T
No. 2 Penn State		–		11	–	0	–	0
No. 17 West Virginia		–		10	–	1	–	0
No. 12 Houston		–		9	–	2	–	0
No. 5 Notre Dame		–		8	–	2	–	1
Buffalo		–		6	–	3	–	0
Rutgers		–		6	–	3	–	0
Villanova		–		6	–	3	–	0
Florida State		–		6	–	3	–	1
Colgate		–		5	–	3	–	1
Air Force		–		6	–	4	–	0
West Texas State		–		6	–	4	–	0
Boston College		–		5	–	4	–	0
New Mexico State		–		5	–	5	–	0
Southern Miss		–		5	–	5	–	0
Syracuse		–		5	–	5	–	0
Army		–		4	–	5	–	1
Virginia Tech		–		4	–	5	–	1
Georgia Tech		–		4	–	6	–	0
Miami (FL)		–		4	–	6	–	0
Pittsburgh		–		4	–	6	–	0
Dayton		–		3	–	7	–	0
Marshall		–		3	–	7	–	0
Northern Illinois		–		3	–	7	–	0
Tulane		–		3	–	7	–	0
Utah State		–		3	–	7	–	0
Navy		–		1	–	9	–	0
Xavier		–		1	–	9	–	0
Rankings from AP Poll

The 1969 New Mexico State Aggies football team was an American football team that represented New Mexico State University as an independent during the 1969 NCAA University Division football season. In their second year under head coach Jim Wood, the Aggies compiled a 5–5 record and were outscored by a total of 235 to 199. The team played home games at home games at Memorial Stadium in Las Cruces, New Mexico.

== Schedule ==
Date	Time	Opponent	Site	Result	Attendance	Source
September 20		Howard Payne	Memorial Stadium; Las Cruces, NM	W 21–14		
September 27		at UT Arlington	Memorial Stadium; Arlington, TX	W 16–7	9,500	
October 4		at Lamar Tech	Cardinal Stadium; Beaumont, TX	L 7–9	13,747	
October 11	12:30 p.m.	at Wichita State	Cessna Stadium; Wichita, KS	W 23–6	13,762	
October 18	7:30 p.m.	North Texas State	Memorial Stadium; Las Cruces, NM	L 12–30	17,776	
October 25	12:50 p.m.	at West Texas State	Buffalo Bowl; Canyon, TX	L 16–17	16,500	
November 8		at UTEP	Sun Bowl; El Paso, TX (rivalry)	W 41–38	17,772	
November 15		at San Diego State	San Diego Stadium; San Diego, CA	L 21–70	25,827	
November 22		New Mexico	Memorial Stadium; Las Cruces, NM (rivalry)	L 21–24	14,078	
November 27		Colorado State	Memorial Stadium; Las Cruces, NM	W 21–20	5,280	
All times are in Mountain time
