= 1969 Navy Midshipmen football team =

American college football season

1969 Navy Midshipmen football
- Conference: Independent
- Record: 1–9
- Head coach: Rick Forzano (1st season)
- Captains: Dan Pike; Jeff Krstich
- Home stadium: Navy–Marine Corps Memorial Stadium

1969 NCAA University Division independents football records
	Conf.			Overall
Team	W	L	T	W		L		T
No. 2 Penn State		–		11	–	0	–	0
No. 17 West Virginia		–		10	–	1	–	0
No. 12 Houston		–		9	–	2	–	0
No. 5 Notre Dame		–		8	–	2	–	1
Buffalo		–		6	–	3	–	0
Rutgers		–		6	–	3	–	0
Villanova		–		6	–	3	–	0
Florida State		–		6	–	3	–	1
Colgate		–		5	–	3	–	1
Air Force		–		6	–	4	–	0
West Texas State		–		6	–	4	–	0
Boston College		–		5	–	4	–	0
New Mexico State		–		5	–	5	–	0
Southern Miss		–		5	–	5	–	0
Syracuse		–		5	–	5	–	0
Army		–		4	–	5	–	1
Virginia Tech		–		4	–	5	–	1
Georgia Tech		–		4	–	6	–	0
Miami (FL)		–		4	–	6	–	0
Pittsburgh		–		4	–	6	–	0
Dayton		–		3	–	7	–	0
Marshall		–		3	–	7	–	0
Northern Illinois		–		3	–	7	–	0
Tulane		–		3	–	7	–	0
Utah State		–		3	–	7	–	0
Navy		–		1	–	9	–	0
Xavier		–		1	–	9	–	0
Rankings from AP Poll

The 1969 Navy Midshipmen football team represented the United States Naval Academy (USNA) as an independent during the 1969 NCAA University Division football season. The team was led by first-year head coach Rick Forzano.

== Schedule ==
Date	Time	Opponent	Site	Result	Attendance	Source
September 20	2:00 p.m.	Penn State	Navy–Marine Corps Memorial Stadium; Annapolis, MD	L 22–45	28,796	
September 27	1:30 p.m.	at Boston College	Alumni Stadium; Chestnut Hill, MA	L 14–21	24,200	
October 4	8:30 p.m.	at Texas	Memorial Stadium; Austin, TX	L 17–56	63,500	
October 11	1:30 p.m.	at Pittsburgh	Pitt Stadium; Pittsburgh, PA	L 19–46	23,880	
October 18	2:00 p.m.	at Rutgers	Rutgers Stadium; Piscataway, NJ	L 6–20	27,000	
October 25	2:00 p.m.	Virginia^{†}	Navy–Marine Corps Memorial Stadium; Annapolis, MD	W 10–0	26,412	
November 1	1:30 p.m.	at Notre Dame	Notre Dame Stadium; Notre Dame, IN (rivalry)	L 0–47	59,075	
November 7	8:14 p.m.	at Miami (FL)	Miami Orange Bowl; Miami, FL	L 10–30	37,972	
November 15	1:30 p.m.	Syracuse	Navy–Marine Corps Memorial Stadium; Annapolis, MD	L 0–15	20,215	
November 29	1:35 p.m.	vs. Army	John F. Kennedy Stadium; Philadelphia, PA (Army–Navy Game)	L 0–27	102,000	
^{†}Homecoming; All times are in Eastern time

== Roster ==
1969 Navy Midshipmen football team roster
Players			Coaches
Offense: Pos. / # / Name / Class; QB / / Mike McNallen / Jr	Defense: Pos. / # / Name / Class	Special teams: Pos. / # / Name / Class	Head coach: Rick Forzano; Coordinators/assistant coaches Legend: (C) Team captain; (S) Suspended; (I) Ineligible; Injured; Redshirt
