= 1969 Colgate Red Raiders football team =

American college football season

1969 Colgate Red Raiders football
- Conference: Independent
- Record: 5–3–1
- Head coach: Neil Wheelwright (2nd season)
- Captain: Alan Klumpp
- Home stadium: Andy Kerr Stadium

1969 NCAA University Division independents football records
	Conf.			Overall
Team	W	L	T	W		L		T
No. 2 Penn State		–		11	–	0	–	0
No. 17 West Virginia		–		10	–	1	–	0
No. 12 Houston		–		9	–	2	–	0
No. 5 Notre Dame		–		8	–	2	–	1
Buffalo		–		6	–	3	–	0
Rutgers		–		6	–	3	–	0
Villanova		–		6	–	3	–	0
Florida State		–		6	–	3	–	1
Colgate		–		5	–	3	–	1
Air Force		–		6	–	4	–	0
West Texas State		–		6	–	4	–	0
Boston College		–		5	–	4	–	0
New Mexico State		–		5	–	5	–	0
Southern Miss		–		5	–	5	–	0
Syracuse		–		5	–	5	–	0
Army		–		4	–	5	–	1
Virginia Tech		–		4	–	5	–	1
Georgia Tech		–		4	–	6	–	0
Miami (FL)		–		4	–	6	–	0
Pittsburgh		–		4	–	6	–	0
Dayton		–		3	–	7	–	0
Marshall		–		3	–	7	–	0
Northern Illinois		–		3	–	7	–	0
Tulane		–		3	–	7	–	0
Utah State		–		3	–	7	–	0
Navy		–		1	–	9	–	0
Xavier		–		1	–	9	–	0
Rankings from AP Poll

The 1969 Colgate Red Raiders football team was an American football team that represented Colgate University as an independent during the 1969 NCAA University Division football season. In its second season under head coach Neil Wheelwright, the team compiled a 5-3-1 record. Alan Klumpp was the team captain.

The Red Raiders scheduled 10 games, but only played nine, as Holy Cross canceled its trip to Hamilton after a hepatitis outbreak on the Crusader team.

The team played its home games at Andy Kerr Stadium in Hamilton, New York.

== Schedule ==
Date	Opponent	Site	Result	Attendance	Source
September 20	Boston University	Andy Kerr Stadium; Hamilton, NY	L 0–20	5,000	
September 27	at Cornell	Schoellkopf Field; Ithaca, NY (rivalry)	W 28–24	18,000	
October 4	at Yale	Yale Bowl; New Haven, CT	L 21–40	23,727	
October 11	Holy Cross	Andy Kerr Stadium; Hamilton, NY	Canceled		
October 18	at Princeton	Palmer Stadium; Princeton, NJ	W 35–28	22,000	
October 25	at Brown	Brown Stadium; Providence, RI	W 20–6	14,200	
November 1	at Lehigh	Taylor Stadium; Bethlehem, PA	T 14–14	7,500	
November 8	Bucknell	Andy Kerr Stadium; Hamilton, NY	W 28–7		
November 15	at Lafayette	Fisher Field; Easton, PA	W 40–0	4,000–6,500	
November 22	at Rutgers	Rutgers Stadium; Piscataway, NJ	L 12–48	14,500	

== Leading players ==
Two trophies were awarded to the Red Raiders' most valuable players in 1969:

- Al Klumpp, wide receiver, received the Andy Kerr Trophy, awarded to the most valuable offensive player.
- Eric Anderson, linebacker, received the Hal W. Lahar Trophy, awarded to the most valuable defensive player.

Statistical leaders for the 1969 Red Raiders included:

- Rushing: Dom Fischer, 734 yards and 8 touchdowns on 223 attempts
- Passing: Steve Goepel, 1,196 yards, 88 completions and 7 touchdowns on 182 attempts
- Receiving: Alan Klumpp, 559 yards and 5 touchdowns on 40 receptions
- Total offense: Steve Goepel, 1,159 yards (1,196 passing, minus-37 rushing)
- Scoring: Two players with 48 points: Al Klumpp (5 touchdowns, 18 PATs) and Dom Fischer (8 touchdowns)
- All-purpose yards: Dominic Fischer, 1,090 yards (734 rushing, 217 kickoff returning, 86 punt returning, 53 receiving)
