= Bill Etter =

American gridiron football player (born 1950)

No. 2
- Position: Quarterback

Personal information
- Born: February 18, 1950 (age 76); Spokane, Washington, U.S.
- Listed height: 6 ft 2 in (1.88 m)
- Listed weight: 185 lb (84 kg)

Career information
- College: University of Notre Dame

Career history
- 1973–1975: Hamilton Tiger-Cats (CFL)

William F. Etter (born February 18, 1950) is an American former football quarterback. He was an All-American at Lewis and Clark High School in Spokane; a two-game starter for the University of Notre Dame until a knee injury ended his college career; and a three-year backup for the CFL's Hamilton Tiger-Cats, from 1973 to 1975. He is currently a commercial and personal injury defense lawyer in Spokane.

Etter held the Notre Dame record for the most rushing yards by a quarterback in a single game—146 yards against the Naval Academy, accomplished as a backup to Joe Theismann in 1969.
