= 1969 NCAA University Division football season =

American college football season

- Preseason AP No. 1: Ohio State
- Regular season: September 20 – December 6, 1969
- Number of bowls: 11
- Bowl games: December 6, 1969 – January 1, 1970
- Champion(s): Texas (AP, Coaches, FWAA, NFF)
- Heisman: Oklahoma halfback Steve Owens

The 1969 NCAA University Division football season was celebrated as the centennial of college football (the first season being the one in 1869).

During the 20th century, the NCAA had no playoff for the major college football teams, later known as "Division I-A." The NCAA Football Guide, however, did note an "unofficial national champion" based on the top-ranked teams in the "wire service" (AP and UPI) polls. The "writers' poll" by Associated Press (AP) was the most popular, followed by the "coaches' poll" by United Press International (UPI). In 1969, the UPI issued its final poll before the bowls, but the AP Trophy was withheld until the postseason was completed.

The AP poll in 1969 consisted of the votes of as many as 45 sportswriters, though not all of them voted in every poll. Those who cast votes would give their opinion of the twenty best teams. Under a point system of 20 points for first place, 19 for second, etc., the "overall" ranking was determined. In 1969, there were four regular season games that matched "Top Five" teams.

This was the last season in which teams were limited to ten games during the regular season; the NCAA allowed eleven starting in 1970.

== Rule changes ==
- Cleat lengths are limited to 3/4 inch (19 mm).
- Batting a lateral pass forward is illegal.
- The definition of "roughing the kicker" is clarified.

== Conference and program changes ==
- The Pacific Coast Athletic Association (PCAA, now Big West Conference) began its first season of play in 1969 with seven teams from the state of California.

School	1968 Conference	1969 Conference
Cal State Los Angeles Golden Eagles	CCAA	PCAA
Fresno State Bulldogs	CCAA	PCAA
Long Beach State 49ers	CCAA	PCAA
Marshall Thundering Herd	MAC	Independent
Pacific Tigers	Independent	PCAA
San Jose State Spartans	Independent	PCAA
San Diego State Aztecs	CCAA	PCAA
UC Santa Barbara Gauchos	Independent	PCAA

Prior to the season, the University Division expanded from 114 to 118 teams. The four elevated from the College Division for 1969 were Northern Illinois, San Diego State, Idaho, and Pacific; the latter two were dropped down in 1967.

== September ==
In the preseason poll released on September 15, the defending champion Ohio State Buckeyes were at the top with 26 of the 33 first place votes. Arkansas was second, followed by Penn State, Texas, and USC.

September 20: No. 1 Ohio State had not yet started its season, and No. 2 Arkansas beat Oklahoma State 39–0 at Little Rock. No. 3 Penn State won 45–22 at Navy, No. 4 Texas won 17–0 at California, and No. 5 USC won 31–21 at Nebraska. The next poll was No. 1 Ohio State, No. 2 Penn State, No. 3 Arkansas, No. 4 Texas, and No. 5 USC.

September 27: No. 1 Ohio State opened its season with a 62–0 dismantling of TCU. No. 2 Penn State beat Colorado 27–3, and No. 3 Arkansas overpowered Tulsa 55–0. No. 4 Texas won 49–7 over Texas Tech and No. 5 USC beat Northwestern at home 48–6. Rutgers hosted Princeton, just as it had one hundred years earlier on November 6, 1869, the first college football game. In 1869, Rutgers had 6 goals to Princeton's four, and a century later, Rutgers won 29–0. The top five remained unchanged in the next poll.

== October ==
October 4: No. 1 Ohio State beat Washington 41–14 at Seattle. No. 2 Penn State narrowly won 17–14 at Kansas State, causing them to drop in the next poll. No. 3 Arkansas beat TCU 24–6 at Little Rock, No. 4 Texas beat Navy 56–17, and No. 5 USC won 31–7 at Oregon State. The next poll was No. 1 Ohio State, No. 2 Texas, No. 3 Arkansas, No. 4 USC, and No, 5 Penn State.

October 11: Several of the top teams played ranked opponents. No. 1 Ohio State beat No. 19 Michigan State 54–21 at home. No. 2 Texas defeated No. 8 Oklahoma 27–17 in their Dallas rivalry game and No. 3 Arkansas was idle. No. 4 USC got past No. 16 Stanford on a last second field goal, 26–24, and No. 5 Penn State beat No. 17 West Virginia 20–0 at home. The next poll was No. 1 Ohio State, No. 2 Texas, No. 3 USC, No. 4 Arkansas, and No. 5 Penn State.

- On October 17, Wyoming head coach Lloyd Eaton dismissed 14 African-American players who had announced plans to wear black armbands during the Cowboys' game the next day against BYU as a protest against the now-disavowed racial doctrines of the LDS Church. The players would become known as the "Black 14".

October 18: No. 1 Ohio State won 34–7 at Minnesota, and No. 2 Texas was idle. No. 3 USC tied No. 11 Notre Dame 14–14 at South Bend. No. 4 Arkansas won 21–7 at Baylor, and No. 5 Penn State narrowly stayed unbeaten at Syracuse, winning 15–14. Two new teams moved ahead of USC and Penn State: No. 6 Missouri won 31–21 over Oklahoma State, and No. 7 Tennessee beat No. 20 Alabama 41–14 in Birmingham. The next poll was No. 1 Ohio State, No. 2 Texas, No. 3 Tennessee, No. 4 Arkansas, and No. 5 Missouri.

October 25: No. 1 Ohio State shut out Illinois 41–0 and No. 2 Texas blanked Rice 31–0 in Austin. No. 3 Tennessee was idle. No. 4 Arkansas beat Wichita State 52–14 in Little Rock. No. 5 Missouri lost at unranked Colorado 31–24, while No. 8 Penn State defeated Ohio University 42–3 and returned to the Top Five. The next poll was No. 1 Ohio State, No. 2 Texas, No. 3 Tennessee, No. 4 Arkansas, and No. 5 Penn State

== November ==
November 1: No. 1 Ohio State won at Northwestern 35–6, and No. 2 Texas beat SMU 45–14 at Dallas. No. 3 Tennessee won 17–3 at No. 11 Georgia, No. 4 Arkansas beat Texas A&M 35–13, and No. 5 Penn State beat Boston College 38–16. The top five remained unchanged.

November 8: No. 1 Ohio State beat Wisconsin 62–7, and No. 2 Texas beat Baylor 56–14. No. 3 Tennessee beat South Carolina 29–14, No. 4 Arkansas defeated Rice in Houston 30–6, and No. 5 Penn State was idle. The top five (all of whom had 7−0 records) again remained the same.

November 15: No. 1 Ohio State hosted No. 10 Purdue and won 42–14. By this time, coach Woody Hayes' Buckeyes had outscored their opposition 371–69 and had an 8–0 record with one game left. No. 2 Texas was comparably dominant, having outscored its opponents 360–76 after beating TCU 69–7 at home to go 8–0. However, No. 3 Tennessee was shut out 38–0 by No. 18 Ole Miss in Jackson. No. 4 Arkansas beat SMU 28–15 in Dallas, No. 5 Penn State blanked Maryland 48–0, and No. 6 USC beat Washington 16–7 at Seattle. In the next poll, Ohio State and Texas stayed at No. 1 and No. 2 for the 7th straight week, each with a 62-point win over their common opponent (TCU, otherwise a 4–4 team). The remainder of the top five was No. 3 Arkansas, No. 4 Penn State, and No. 5 USC.

November 22: After averaging 46 points in its first eight games, No. 1 Ohio State could only manage twelve points at No. 12 Michigan and lost 24–12, ending its 22-game winning streak. In the opening salvo of "The Ten Year War", new coach Bo Schembechler led the Wolverines to the Big Ten championship and a spot in the Rose Bowl. No. 5 USC, aided by a pass interference penalty on fourth down that led to the late game-winning touchdown, closed with a 14–12 win over city rival No. 6 UCLA in a matchup of unbeatens (both 8–0–1) that decided the Pac-8 championship and the other Rose Bowl berth. For the second straight year, the Trojans finished the regular season 9−0−1 with the only blemish being a tie against Notre Dame. No. 2 Texas and No. 3 Arkansas were idle this week, while No. 4 Penn State won 27–7 at Pittsburgh. In the next poll, Texas took the top spot: No. 1 Texas, No. 2 Arkansas, No. 3 Penn State, No. 4 Ohio State, and No. 5 USC.

November 27−29: In Southwest Conference play on Thanksgiving Day, No. 1 Texas won at Texas A&M 49–12, while No. 2 Arkansas beat Texas Tech 33–0 in Little Rock. Two days later, No. 3 Penn State won 33–8 at North Carolina State and was considered for the Cotton Bowl, where the Southwestern Conference champ (Texas or Arkansas) would go. Before Ohio State's loss, however, the players had voted to accept a bid to the Orange Bowl, because they preferred going to Miami instead of Dallas. Certain to move up to No. 2 regardless of how the Texas-Arkansas game came out, Penn State unexpectedly had passed up a chance to go up against the No. 1 team in the nation. Instead, they would face off against No. 6 Missouri, which tied for the Big 8 championship with Nebraska and got the Orange Bowl bid by virtue of a 17−7 victory over the Cornhuskers in October. With No. 4 Ohio State and No. 5 USC having finished their seasons, the top five remained the same going into December.

== December ==
December 6: No. 1 and No. 2 would not meet in a bowl, but faced off at Razorback Stadium in Fayetteville, Arkansas, for the final regular season game for both teams. Both unbeaten at 9–0, No. 1 Texas traveled to meet No. 2 Arkansas for a game to determine the unofficial champion. Among the 44,000 in attendance was President Richard Nixon, who had with him a plaque to award to the "national champion", while an estimated 50 million viewers watched the game on ABC television. After three quarters, Arkansas led 14–0. In the fourth quarter, Longhorns' quarterback James Street couldn't find a receiver and ran 42 yards for a touchdown, then carried over the ball for two to cut the lead to six at 14–8. With 4:47 to play, the Longhorns were on their own 43 on fourth down with three yards to go. Street threw long to Randy Peschel open downfield, who made the catch and fell out of bounds on the 13-yard line. After Ted Koy ran for eleven yards, Jim Bertelsen went over to tie the score, and the extra point kick by Happy Feller gave Texas a 15–14 lead with just under four minutes remaining. A late interception stopped the Hogs and Texas remained undefeated. President Nixon presented the plaque to Texas head coach Darrell Royal after the game. Because both teams had been unbeaten in Southwest Conference play, the game also determined the SWC championship, with Texas getting the bid for the Cotton Bowl. The final regular season poll was No. 1 Texas, No. 2 Penn State, No. 3 Arkansas, No. 4 Ohio State, and No. 5 USC.

Texas' and Arkansas' bowl opponents were decided under strange circumstances. Arkansas accepted an invitation to the Sugar Bowl, where they would normally have faced either No. 8 LSU or No. 11 Tennessee, the co-champions of the SEC. However, LSU tried instead to arrange a matchup against Texas in the Cotton Bowl, which the school officials viewed as an opportunity to play for the national championship. The negotiations fell through when No. 9 Notre Dame unexpectedly became available. Needing money for scholarships, the Fighting Irish decided to repeal their longstanding policy against appearing in bowl games and offered to become Texas' Cotton Bowl opponent. Meanwhile, the Sugar Bowl organizers spurned LSU and Tennessee in favor of No. 13 Ole Miss, which held just a 7−3 record but had dealt both the Tigers and the Volunteers their only loss of the regular season. Tennessee was relegated to the Gator Bowl, while LSU stayed home entirely.

== Conference standings ==
1969 Atlantic Coast Conference football standings
	Conf.					Overall
Team	W		L		T	W		L		T
South Carolina $	6	–	0	–	0	7	–	4	–	0
NC State	3	–	2	–	1	3	–	6	–	1
North Carolina	3	–	3	–	0	5	–	5	–	0
Clemson	3	–	3	–	0	4	–	6	–	0
Duke	3	–	3	–	1	3	–	6	–	1
Maryland	3	–	3	–	0	3	–	7	–	0
Wake Forest	2	–	5	–	0	3	–	7	–	0
Virginia	1	–	5	–	0	3	–	7	–	0
$ – Conference champion; Rankings from AP Poll

1969 Big Eight Conference football standings
	Conf.					Overall
Team	W		L		T	W		L		T
No. 6 Missouri +	6	–	1	–	0	9	–	2	–	0
No. 11 Nebraska +	6	–	1	–	0	9	–	2	–	0
No. 16 Colorado	5	–	2	–	0	8	–	3	–	0
Oklahoma	4	–	3	–	0	6	–	4	–	0
Kansas State	3	–	4	–	0	5	–	5	–	0
Oklahoma State	3	–	4	–	0	5	–	5	–	0
Iowa State	1	–	6	–	0	3	–	7	–	0
Kansas	0	–	7	–	0	1	–	9	–	0
+ – Conference co-champions; Rankings from AP Poll

1969 Big Sky Conference football standings
	Conf.					Overall
Team	W		L		T	W		L		T
Montana $	4	–	0	–	0	10	–	1	–	0
Weber State	3	–	1	–	0	6	–	4	–	0
Idaho State	2	–	2	–	0	5	–	5	–	0
Idaho	1	–	3	–	0	2	–	8	–	0
Montana State	0	–	4	–	0	1	–	8	–	0
$ – Conference champion

1969 Big Ten Conference football standings
	Conf.					Overall
Team	W		L		T	W		L		T
No. 4 Ohio State +	6	–	1	–	0	8	–	1	–	0
No. 9 Michigan +	6	–	1	–	0	8	–	3	–	0
No. 18 Purdue	5	–	2	–	0	8	–	2	–	0
Minnesota	4	–	3	–	0	4	–	5	–	1
Iowa	3	–	4	–	0	5	–	5	–	0
Indiana	3	–	4	–	0	4	–	6	–	0
Northwestern	3	–	4	–	0	3	–	7	–	0
Wisconsin	3	–	4	–	0	3	–	7	–	0
Michigan State	2	–	5	–	0	4	–	6	–	0
Illinois	0	–	7	–	0	0	–	10	–	0
+ – Conference co-champions; Rankings from AP Poll

1969 Ivy League football standings
	Conf.					Overall
Team	W		L		T	W		L		T
Dartmouth +	6	–	1	–	0	8	–	1	–	0
Yale +	6	–	1	–	0	7	–	2	–	0
Princeton +	6	–	1	–	0	6	–	3	–	0
Cornell	4	–	3	–	0	4	–	5	–	0
Penn	2	–	5	–	0	4	–	5	–	0
Harvard	2	–	5	–	0	3	–	6	–	0
Brown	1	–	6	–	0	2	–	7	–	0
Columbia	1	–	6	–	0	1	–	8	–	0
+ – Conference co-champions

1969 Mid-American Conference football standings
	Conf.					Overall
Team	W		L		T	W		L		T
Toledo $	5	–	0	–	0	11	–	0	–	0
Bowling Green	4	–	1	–	0	6	–	4	–	0
Miami (OH)	2	–	3	–	0	7	–	3	–	0
Ohio	2	–	3	–	0	5	–	4	–	1
Kent State	1	–	4	–	0	5	–	5	–	0
Western Michigan	1	–	4	–	0	4	–	6	–	0
$ – Conference champion

1969 Missouri Valley Conference football standings
	Conf.					Overall
Team	W		L		T	W		L		T
Memphis State $	5	–	0	–	0	8	–	2	–	0
North Texas State	4	–	1	–	0	7	–	3	–	0
Louisville	2	–	3	–	0	5	–	4	–	1
Cincinnati	2	–	3	–	0	4	–	6	–	0
Wichita State	1	–	4	–	0	2	–	8	–	0
Tulsa	1	–	4	–	0	1	–	9	–	0
$ – Conference champion; Memphis State and Wichita State's games against Florida State counted in the conference standings.

1969 Pacific Coast Athletic Association football standings
	Conf.					Overall
Team	W		L		T	W		L		T
San Diego State $	6	–	0	–	0	11	–	0	–	0
Long Beach State	3	–	1	–	0	8	–	3	–	0
Pacific (CA)	2	–	2	–	0	7	–	3	–	0
San Jose State	1	–	1	–	0	2	–	8	–	0
UC Santa Barbara	1	–	3	–	0	6	–	4	–	0
Fresno State	1	–	3	–	0	6	–	4	–	0
Cal State Los Angeles	0	–	4	–	0	0	–	9	–	0
$ – Conference champion

1969 Pacific-8 Conference football standings
	Conf.					Overall
Team	W		L		T	W		L		T
No. 3 USC $	6	–	0	–	0	10	–	0	–	1
No. 13 UCLA	5	–	1	–	1	8	–	1	–	1
No. 19 Stanford	5	–	1	–	1	7	–	2	–	1
Oregon State	4	–	3	–	0	6	–	4	–	0
Oregon	2	–	3	–	0	5	–	5	–	1
California	2	–	4	–	0	5	–	5	–	0
Washington	1	–	6	–	0	1	–	9	–	0
Washington State	0	–	7	–	0	1	–	9	–	0
$ – Conference champion; Rankings from AP Poll

1969 Southeastern Conference football standings
	Conf.					Overall
Team	W		L		T	W		L		T
No. 15 Tennessee $	5	–	1	–	0	9	–	2	–	0
No. 10 LSU	4	–	1	–	0	9	–	1	–	0
No. 20 Auburn	5	–	2	–	0	8	–	3	–	0
No. 14 Florida	3	–	1	–	1	9	–	1	–	1
No. 8 Ole Miss	4	–	2	–	0	8	–	3	–	0
Georgia	2	–	3	–	1	5	–	5	–	1
Vanderbilt	2	–	3	–	0	4	–	6	–	0
Alabama	2	–	4	–	0	6	–	5	–	0
Kentucky	1	–	6	–	0	2	–	8	–	0
Mississippi State	0	–	5	–	0	3	–	7	–	0
$ – Conference champion; Rankings from AP Poll

1969 Southern Conference football standings
	Conf.					Overall
Team	W		L		T	W		L		T
Davidson +	5	–	1	–	0	7	–	4	–	0
Richmond +	5	–	1	–	0	6	–	4	–	0
The Citadel	4	–	2	–	0	7	–	3	–	0
William & Mary	2	–	2	–	0	3	–	7	–	0
East Carolina	1	–	3	–	0	2	–	7	–	0
Furman	0	–	4	–	0	1	–	8	–	1
VMI	0	–	4	–	0	0	–	10	–	0
+ – Conference co-champions

1969 Southwest Conference football standings
	Conf.					Overall
Team	W		L		T	W		L		T
No. 1 Texas $	7	–	0	–	0	11	–	0	–	0
No. 7 Arkansas	6	–	1	–	0	9	–	2	–	0
Texas Tech	4	–	3	–	0	5	–	5	–	0
TCU	4	–	3	–	0	4	–	6	–	0
SMU	3	–	4	–	0	3	–	7	–	0
Rice	2	–	5	–	0	3	–	7	–	0
Texas A&M	2	–	5	–	0	3	–	7	–	0
Baylor	0	–	7	–	0	0	–	10	–	0
$ – Conference champion; Rankings from AP Poll

1969 Western Athletic Conference football standings
	Conf.					Overall
Team	W		L		T	W		L		T
Arizona State $	6	–	1	–	0	8	–	2	–	0
Utah	5	–	1	–	0	8	–	2	–	0
BYU	4	–	3	–	0	6	–	4	–	0
Wyoming	4	–	3	–	0	6	–	4	–	0
Arizona	3	–	3	–	0	3	–	7	–	0
UTEP	2	–	5	–	0	4	–	6	–	0
New Mexico	1	–	5	–	0	4	–	6	–	0
Colorado State	0	–	4	–	0	4	–	6	–	0
$ – Conference champion

1969 NCAA University Division independents football records
	Conf.			Overall
Team	W	L	T	W		L		T
No. 2 Penn State		–		11	–	0	–	0
No. 17 West Virginia		–		10	–	1	–	0
No. 12 Houston		–		9	–	2	–	0
No. 5 Notre Dame		–		8	–	2	–	1
Buffalo		–		6	–	3	–	0
Rutgers		–		6	–	3	–	0
Villanova		–		6	–	3	–	0
Florida State		–		6	–	3	–	1
Colgate		–		5	–	3	–	1
Air Force		–		6	–	4	–	0
West Texas State		–		6	–	4	–	0
Boston College		–		5	–	4	–	0
New Mexico State		–		5	–	5	–	0
Southern Miss		–		5	–	5	–	0
Syracuse		–		5	–	5	–	0
Army		–		4	–	5	–	1
Virginia Tech		–		4	–	5	–	1
Georgia Tech		–		4	–	6	–	0
Miami (FL)		–		4	–	6	–	0
Pittsburgh		–		4	–	6	–	0
Dayton		–		3	–	7	–	0
Marshall		–		3	–	7	–	0
Northern Illinois		–		3	–	7	–	0
Tulane		–		3	–	7	–	0
Utah State		–		3	–	7	–	0
Navy		–		1	–	9	–	0
Xavier		–		1	–	9	–	0
Rankings from AP Poll

== Bowl games ==
=== Major bowls ===
Thursday, January 1, 1970

Bowl	Winning team		Losing team	
Cotton	No. 1 Texas Longhorns	21	No. 9 Notre Dame Fighting Irish	17
Sugar	No. 13 Ole Miss Rebels	27	No. 3 Arkansas Razorbacks	22
Rose	No. 5 USC Trojans	10	No. 7 Michigan Wolverines	3
Orange	No. 2 Penn State Nittany Lions	10	No. 6 Missouri Tigers	3

At the Cotton Bowl in Dallas, the No. 1 Texas Longhorns were facing the end of their unbeaten streak before a crowd of 73,000 against No. 9 Notre Dame, playing in its first bowl game in 45 years, since the 1925 Rose Bowl. Trailing 17–14 with 2:26 left in the game, Texas faced a fourth-and-two situation on the Irish ten-yard line. Settling for a tying field goal was out of the question, but a failure to convert would give Notre Dame the ball and the chance to run out the clock. Texas QB James Street managed to fire a pass over the head of the equally determined linebacker Bob Olson. Cotton Speyrer came down with the ball on the two-yard line, just before the ball hit the ground. The officials paused before ruling that the pass was indeed complete; on third down from the one, Billy Dale took the ball in for the winning points and, ultimately, the title.

In the final poll after the bowls, the Texas Longhorns were the top choice for 36 of the 45 writers voting, and won the AP Trophy. The final AP top 20 was: 1.Texas 2.Penn State 3.USC 4.Ohio State 5.Notre Dame 6.Missouri 7.Arkansas 8.Ole Miss 9.Michigan 10.UCLA 11.Nebraska 12.Houston 13.LSU 14.Florida 15.Tennessee 16.Colorado 17. West Virginia 18.Purdue 19.Stanford and 20.Auburn.

=== Other bowls ===
Bowl	City	State	Date	Winner	Score	Runner-up
Sun	El Paso	Texas	December 20	No. 14 Nebraska	45–6	Georgia
Gator	Jacksonville	Florida	December 27	No. 15 Florida	14–13	No. 11 Tennessee
Tangerine	Orlando	Florida	December 26	No. 20 Toledo	56–33	Davidson
Astro-Bluebonnet	Houston	Texas	December 31	No. 17 Houston	36–7	No. 12 Auburn
Liberty	Memphis	Tennessee	December 13	Colorado	47–33	Alabama
Peach	Atlanta	Georgia	December 30	No. 19 West Virginia	14–3	South Carolina
Pasadena	Pasadena	California	December 6	San Diego State	28–7	Boston University

- Prior to the 1975 season, the Big Ten and Pac-8 conferences allowed only one postseason participant each, for the Rose Bowl.

With its bowl win, No. 11 Nebraska (9–2) ended 1969 on a seven-game winning streak. The Huskers were undefeated in the next two seasons to win consecutive national championships, with an unbeaten streak of 32 games.

== Special helmet design ==
Many schools, at the behest of the NCAA, commemorated the 1969 season by wearing a special decal on their football helmets. The decal consisted of the numeral "100" inside a football shaped outline. The decal was designed to commemorate the 1869 game between Rutgers and Princeton, often cited as the first college football game. Decals varied greatly from one team to another. Some teams placed the decals unobtrusively on the front or back of the helmet. Other teams placed them prominently on the side, either in addition to or in place of their regular team logo. Colors and design of the decals also varied greatly between teams; with different numeral styles and color schemes in use. One notable exception was Harvard, which abstained from the 1969 commemoration, and had its own special helmet decal made for the 1974 season, which commemorates an 1874 game that Harvard played against McGill that Harvard claims was the "real" first football game.

== Awards and honors ==
=== Heisman Trophy ===
Steve Owens of Oklahoma had rushed for 3,867 yards and scored 56 touchdowns in three seasons with the Sooners. In 1969, he had 29 touchdowns and scored 138 points, and rushed for 248 yards against Iowa State. Owens was the 19th selection in the 1970 NFL draft and played for the Detroit Lions. Following him in the Heisman voting were three quarterbacks: Mike Phipps of Purdue, Rex Kern of Ohio State, and Archie Manning of Mississippi. Defensive tackle Mike Reid of Penn State, the Outland Trophy winner, was fifth.

Player	School	Position	1st	2nd	3rd	Total
Steve Owens	Oklahoma	RB	294	218	170	1,488
Mike Phipps	Purdue	QB	226	230	196	1,334
Rex Kern	Ohio State	QB	154	134	126	856
Archie Manning	Ole Miss	QB	120	76	70	582
Mike Reid	Penn State	DT	61	39	36	297
Mike McCoy	Notre Dame	DT	31	65	67	290
Jim Otis	Ohio State	RB	12	27	31	121
Jim Plunkett	Stanford	QB	21	16	25	120
Steve Kiner	Tennessee	LB	14	20	21	109
Jack Tatum	Ohio State	S	13	22	22	105
