= Mike Oriard =

American football player, college administrator, and professor

No. 50
- Positions: Center, guard

Personal information
- Born: May 26, 1948 (age 78); Spokane, Washington, U.S.
- Listed height: 6 ft 4 in (1.93 m)
- Listed weight: 223 lb (101 kg)

Career information
- High school: Gonzaga Prep (Spokane)
- College: Notre Dame
- NFL draft: 1970: 5th round, 130th overall pick

Career history
- Kansas City Chiefs (1970–1973); Hamilton Ti-cats (1974)
- Stats at Pro Football Reference

Mike Oriard (born May 26, 1948) is an American former professional football player who was an offensive lineman for the Kansas City Chiefs of the National Football League (NFL) and the Hamilton Tiger-Cats of the Canadian Football League (CFL). He played college football for the Notre Dame Fighting Irish. After his football career, he became a college administrator and professor.

== Early life and education ==
Oriard was born in Spokane, Washington. He was a standout athlete at Gonzaga Preparatory School in Spokane.

A graduate of the University of Notre Dame, he was a walk-on player in its football team.

== Professional career ==
Oriard played offensive lineman for four seasons for the Kansas City Chiefs. He then played for the Hamilton Tiger-Cats of the CFL.

== Education career ==
After retiring from football, he earned his PhD at Stanford and became a professor of English and later Associate Dean of the College of Liberal Arts at Oregon State University. His academic work has centered on American sports nonfiction in multiple media.

== Works ==
- Dreaming of Heroes: American Sports Fiction, 1868–1980 (1982)
- Sporting with the Gods: The Rhetoric of Play and Game in American Literature (1991) ISBN 9780521391139
- Reading Football: How the Popular Press Created an American Spectacle (Cultural Studies of the United States) (1998) ISBN 9780807847510
- King Football: Sport and Spectacle in the Golden Age of Radio and Newsreels, Movies and Magazines, the Weekly and the Daily Press (2001)
- Bowled Over: Big-Time College Football from the Sixties to the BCS Era (2009) ISBN 9780807833292
- The End of Autumn: Reflections on My Life in Football (2009) ISBN 9780252076695
- Brand NFL: Making and Selling America's Favorite Sport (2010) ISBN 9780807831427
- The Art of Football: The Early Game in the Golden Age of Illustration (2017) ISBN 9780803290693
