= Bob Olson =

American football player (born 1948)

Profile
- Position: Linebacker

Personal information
- Born: 1948 (age 77–78); Superior, Wisconsin, U.S.

Career information
- High school: Superior (WI) Central

Awards and highlights
- MVP 1970 Cotton Bowl Classic
- Stats at ESPN

Bob Olson (born May 1948) is an American former football player born in Superior, Wisconsin. He attended Notre Dame where he played linebacker between 1968 and 1969 and became team captain. In the 1970 Cotton Bowl Classic game against the University of Texas at Austin, he was selected as the defensive MVP.

During the 1970 NFL draft he was selected in the 5th round, 107th player overall, by the New England Patriots, but didn't make the team. He coached St Joseph's school football for 15 years.
