= 1969 Rutgers Scarlet Knights football team =

American college football season

1969 Rutgers Scarlet Knights football
- Conference: Middle Three Conference
- Record: 6–3 (1–1 Middle Three)
- Head coach: John F. Bateman (10th season)
- Home stadium: Rutgers Stadium

1969 Middle Three Conference football standings
	Conf.					Overall
Team	W		L		T	W		L		T
Lehigh $	2	–	0	–	0	4	–	5	–	1
Rutgers	1	–	1	–	0	6	–	3	–	0
Lafayette	0	–	2	–	0	4	–	6	–	0
$ – Conference champion

The 1969 Rutgers Scarlet Knights football team represented Rutgers University in the 1969 NCAA University Division football season. Rutgers finished second in the Middle Three Conference. In their tenth season under head coach John F. Bateman, the Scarlet Knights compiled a 6–3 record and outscored their opponents 212 to 150. The team's statistical leaders included Rich Policastro with 1,690 passing yards, Steve Ferrughelli with 564 rushing yards, and Jim Benedict with 650 receiving yards.

Throughout the year, Rutgers celebrated the centennial of college football, one hundred years since the 1869 game between Rutgers and Princeton, recognized as the first intercollegiate football game. The 1969 game against Princeton, which Rutgers won 29–0, was broadcast in the Eastern United States by ABC Television. Two weeks later, Rutgers was upset by Lehigh in a 7–17 loss, making this the first year since 1965 that they did not sweep the Middle Three, and the first year since 1957 that Rutgers did not win or at least tie for the championship.

Rutgers played nine games, rather than the scheduled 10, because a November 15 matchup at Holy Cross was canceled following an outbreak of hepatitis among the Massachusetts school's football team.

The Scarlet Knights played their home games at Rutgers Stadium in Piscataway, New Jersey, across the river from the university's main campus in New Brunswick.

== Schedule ==
Date	Time	Opponent	Site	TV	Result	Attendance	Source
September 20		at Lafayette	Fisher Field; Easton, PA		W 44–22	10,000	
September 27		Princeton*	Rutgers Stadium; Piscataway, NJ (rivalry)	ABC	W 29–0	31,000	
October 4		Cornell*	Rutgers Stadium; Piscataway, NJ		W 21–7	17,000	
October 11		Lehigh	Rutgers Stadium; Piscataway, NJ		L 7–17	16,000–17,000	
October 18	2:00 p.m.	Navy*	Rutgers Stadium; Piscataway, NJ		W 20–6	27,000	
October 25		Columbia*^{†}	Rutgers Stadium; Piscataway, NJ		W 21–14	17,000	
November 1		at Delaware*	Delaware Stadium; Newark, DE		L 0–44	14,490	
November 8		at Connecticut*	Memorial Stadium; Storrs, CT		L 22–28	10,346	
November 15		at Holy Cross*	Fitton Field; Worcester, MA		Canceled		
November 22		Colgate*	Rutgers Stadium; Piscataway, NJ		W 48–12	14,500	
*Non-conference game; ^{†}Homecoming; All times are in Eastern time

== Roster ==
1969 Rutgers Scarlet Knights football team roster
Players
Coaches
Offense

Pos.	#	Name	Class
WR	80	John Bauer	Jr
FB	22	Bill Donaldson	So
QB	12	Rich Policastro	Sr
WR	84	Bob Stonebraker	Sr
RB	10	Bruce Van Ness	Sr
QB	15	Mike Yancheff	Jr

Defense

Pos.	#	Name	Class
S	26	Sam Chapman	Jr
LB	32	Kevin O'Connor	Jr
DE	81	Mike Pellowski	Jr
LB	70	Lee Schneider	Sr
DB	31	Larry Walsh	Jr

Special teams

Pos.	#	Name	Class

Head coach

- John F. Bateman

Coordinators/assistant coaches

Legend

- (C) Team captain
- (S) Suspended
- (I) Ineligible
- Injured
- Redshirt
