= 1969 Tulsa Golden Hurricane football team =

American college football season

1969 Tulsa Golden Hurricane football
- Conference: Missouri Valley Conference
- Record: 1–9 (1–4 MVC)
- Head coach: Vince Carillot (1st season)
- Home stadium: Skelly Stadium

1969 Missouri Valley Conference football standings
	Conf.					Overall
Team	W		L		T	W		L		T
Memphis State $	5	–	0	–	0	8	–	2	–	0
North Texas State	4	–	1	–	0	7	–	3	–	0
Louisville	2	–	3	–	0	5	–	4	–	1
Cincinnati	2	–	3	–	0	4	–	6	–	0
Wichita State	1	–	4	–	0	2	–	8	–	0
Tulsa	1	–	4	–	0	1	–	9	–	0
$ – Conference champion; Memphis State and Wichita State's games against Florida State counted in the conference standings.

The 1969 Tulsa Golden Hurricane football team represented the University of Tulsa as a member of Missouri Valley Conference (MVC) during the 1969 NCAA University Division football season. In their first and only year under head coach Vince Carillot, the Golden Hurricane compiled an overall record of 1–9 record with a mark of 1–4 against conference opponents, tying for fifth place at the bottom of the MVC standings.

The team's statistical leaders included Rick Arrington with 1,641 passing yards, Josh Ashton with 851 rushing yards, and Jim Butler with 593 receiving yards.

== Schedule ==
Date	Time	Opponent	Site	Result	Attendance	Source
September 20		at Colorado*	Folsom Field; Boulder, CO	L 14–35	34,784	
September 27		at No. 3 Arkansas*	Razorback Stadium; Fayetteville, AR	L 0–55	42,000–43,617	
October 11		at Tampa*	Tampa Stadium; Tampa, FL	L 14–31	20,179	
October 18		Florida State*	Skelly Stadium; Tulsa, OK	L 20–38	16,500	
October 25	1:30 p.m.	Cincinnati	Skelly Stadium; Tulsa, OK	W 40–24	12,000	
November 1		at Memphis State	Memphis Memorial Stadium; Memphis, TN	L 24–42	23,003	
November 8		Houston*^{†}	Skelly Stadium; Tulsa, OK	L 14–47	17,750	
November 15	2:00 p.m.	at North Texas State	Fouts Field; Denton, TX	L 16–42	5,000	
November 22	1:30 p.m.	at Wichita State	Cessna Stadium; Wichita, KS	L 12–28	19,878	
November 27		Louisville	Skelly Stadium; Tulsa, OK	L 29–35	12,750	
*Non-conference game; ^{†}Homecoming; Rankings from AP Poll released prior to the game; All times are in Central time

== Roster ==
1969 Tulsa Golden Hurricane football team roster
Players
Coaches
Offense

Pos.	#	Name	Class
QB	2	Rick Arrington	Sr
RB	26	Josh Ashton	Jr
OT	74	Jean Barrett	So
QB	5	Ray Borowicz	Jr
WR	11	Ken Duncan	Jr
G	69	Joe Garnero	Jr

Defense

Pos.	#	Name	Class
LB	90	Dick Blanchard	So
DT	75	Tom Brady	So
DT	93	Jim King	So
DB		Ralph McGill	Jr
DB	16	Jim Morgan	Jr
DB	32	Doug Wyatt	Sr

Special teams

Pos.	#	Name	Class
K	3	Larry Cookus	Jr

Head coach

- Vince Carillot

Coordinators/assistant coaches

- Ron Marciniak – Offensive line

Legend

- (C) Team captain
- (S) Suspended
- (I) Ineligible
- Injured
- Redshirt

== After the season ==
=== 1970 NFL draft ===
The following Golden Hurricane players was selected in the 1970 NFL draft following the season.

Round	Pick	Player	Position	NFL club
17	426	Doug Wyatt	Defensive back	New Orleans Saints
