= Joe Perella =

American football coach (1940–2020)

Biographical details
- Born: c. 1940; Chardon, Ohio, U.S.
- Died: November 29, 2020 (aged 79–80); Cleveland, Ohio, U.S.
- Education: John Carroll University (1963); Ashland College

Playing career

Football
- c. 1960s: John Carroll

Basketball
- 1958–1959: Bowling Green
- c. 1960s: John Carroll
- c. 1964–1968: Blepp Coombs
- Positions: Quarterback (football); Forward (basketball)

Coaching career (HC unless noted)

Football
- 1964–1967: Cathedral Latin HS (OH) (assistant freshmen)
- 1968: Florida State (GA)
- 1969: Louisville (ends)
- 1970–1971: Louisville (OB/WR)
- 1972: Cincinnati (backfield)
- 1973: Cathedral Latin HS (OH) (OB/DB)
- 1973: Cathedral Latin HS (OH) (interim HC)
- 1974 (spring): Virginia Ambassadors (OB)
- 1974–1979: Cathedral Latin HS (OH)
- 1980–1989: Beachwood HS (OH)
- 1990: University School (OH) (OC)
- 1991–1993: University School (OH)
- 1994–1999: John Carroll (OC/QB)
- 2000: Winnipeg Blue Bombers (co-OC)
- 2001–2003: Case Western Reserve
- 2009–2012: St. Edward HS (OH) (OC)
- 2013–2016: John Carroll (assistant)

Basketball
- 1964–1965: Cathedral Latin HS (OH) (freshmen)
- 1966–1967: Cathedral Latin HS (OH) (JV)
- 1967–1968: Cathedral Latin HS (OH) (freshmen)
- 1973–1974: Cathedral Latin HS (OH)

Track and field
- 1964–1968: Cathedral Latin HS (OH) (assistant)

Administrative career (AD unless noted)
- ?–1980: Cathedral Latin HS (OH)
- 2004–2009: Beachwood HS (OH)

Head coaching record
- Overall: 16–14 (college football); 92–34–3 (high school football; excluding Cathedral Latin)

Joseph A. Perella Sr. (c. 1940 – November 29, 2020) was an American college football coach. He was the head football coach for Cathedral Latin School—now Notre Dame-Cathedral Latin School—from 1973 to 1979, Beachwood High School from 1980 to 1989, University School from 1990 to 1993, and Case Western Reserve University from 2001 to 2003. He also coached for Florida State, Louisville, Cincinnati, John Carroll, St. Edward High School, and the Winnipeg Blue Bombers of the Canadian Football League (CFL). He played college football for John Carroll.

== Early life and playing career ==
Perella grew up in Chardon, Ohio, and attended Cathedral Latin School—now Notre Dame-Cathedral Latin School. He was a three-sport athlete competing in football, basketball, and track and field. He was named all-senate and all-catholic in basketball.

Perella briefly attended Bowling Green State University and was even named freshman basketball captain in 1958. He then transferred to John Carroll University and played football and basketball. For the Blue Streaks football team he was a quarterback and for the basketball team he was a forward.

Between 1964 and 1968, Perella played semi-professional basketball for the Blepp Coombs Sporting Goods team in the Plain Dealer-Greater Cleveland Basketball League, helping the team to the playoffs in 1964.

== Coaching career ==
In 1964, Perella returned to his alma mater, Cathedral Latin, as an assistant freshmen football coach, freshmen basketball coach, and assistant varsity track coach. In 1966, he transitioned to junior varsity coach for basketball before reverting to freshmen coach the following year.

In 1968, Perella was hired as a graduate assistant for Florida State working with the wide receivers. He was hired alongside former NFL players Joe Avezzano and Junior Wren. After one season, Perella left to join Lee Corso at Louisville as his ends coach. In 1970, he transitioned to coaching the offensive backfield and wide receivers. Perella was crucial in recruiting future NFL linebacker Tom Jackson, as both Jackson and Perella were from Cleveland. After three seasons with Louisville, Perella resigned. He later recalled his experience in an interview with The Daily News stating "We lied to kids. We cheated to get them in school..." and that Corso told him that he was recruiting "too many black kids." Corso came out and denied all accusations Perella made against him, stating Perella was fueled by revenge.

In 1972, Perella was hired as the backfield coach for Cincinnati under head coach Ray Callahan.

In 1973, after five seasons coaching college football, Perella returned to high school, again to his alma mater. He was the head basketball coach and served as the offensive and defensive backs coach for the football team. He served as the team's interim head coach for the final three games of season. He resigned briefly to accept the offensive backfield position for the Virginia Ambassadors of the World Football League (WFL), but opted instead to return to Cathedral Latin and was promptly named head football coach while not returning as basketball coach.

After six seasons as head coach of Cathedral Latin, Perella was hired as the head football coach for Beachwood High School in Beachwood, Ohio. He took over for Dick Self who did not return after a 0–9–1 season as a member of the East Suburban Conference. In 1988, he led the team to a school-record 9–1 record and in the following season led them to their first playoff appearance. He resigned following the 1989 season. After spending the 1990 season as the offensive coordinator for University School, Perella took over as head football coach for long-time coach Cliff Foust. Perella resigned after three seasons as head coach with an overall record of 22–7.

In 1994, Perella returned to college football and was hired as the offensive coordinator for his alma mater, John Carroll, under head coach Tony DeCarlo. Perella transformed the team into an air raid offense and helped lead the team to their first Ohio Athletic Conference (OAC) title since 1989. In 2000, Perella was hired as the co-offensive coordinator and primary play caller for the Winnipeg Blue Bombers of the Canadian Football League (CFL).

In 2001, after one year in the CFL, Perella was hired as the head football coach for Case Western Reserve, taking over for Peter Germano. He earned his first win as a head coach after defeating Oberlin 45–19 where he also snapped an 11-game home losing streak at Finnigan Field. He ended his first season with a record of 5–5, an improvement from 3–7 the year prior. In his second season, he help lead the team to its first winning season since 1991 with a 6–4 record. He resigned after three seasons, leaving an overall record of 16–14. During his tenure as head coach, Perella's teams were known for their potent offenses but lackluster defenses.

In 2004, shortly after Perella's resignation from Case Western Reserve, he rejoined Beachwood High School as the school's athletic director. As athletic director, he hired his son, Joe Perella Jr., as basketball coach. Perella Sr. resigned in 2009 to accept the offensive coordinator position for St. Edward High School under head coach Rick Finotti. He coached at St. Edward until 2012 when he rejoined John Carroll for four seasons before retiring after the 2016 season.

== Personal life and death ==
Perella died on November 29, 2020, in Cleveland.

== Head coaching record ==
=== College football ===
Year	Team	Overall	Conference	Standing	Bowl/playoffs
Case Western Reserve Spartans (University Athletic Association) (2001–2003)
2001	Case Western Reserve	5–5	1–3	3rd	
2002	Case Western Reserve	6–4	1–2	T–2nd	
2003	Case Western Reserve	5–5	0–3	4th	
Case Western Reserve:		16–14	2–8		
Total:		16–14			
