= 1969 Maryland Terrapins football team =

American college football season

1969 Maryland Terrapins football
- Conference: Atlantic Coast Conference
- Record: 3–7 (3–3 ACC)
- Head coach: Roy Lester (1st season)
- Home stadium: Byrd Stadium

1969 Atlantic Coast Conference football standings
	Conf.					Overall
Team	W		L		T	W		L		T
South Carolina $	6	–	0	–	0	7	–	4	–	0
NC State	3	–	2	–	1	3	–	6	–	1
North Carolina	3	–	3	–	0	5	–	5	–	0
Clemson	3	–	3	–	0	4	–	6	–	0
Duke	3	–	3	–	1	3	–	6	–	1
Maryland	3	–	3	–	0	3	–	7	–	0
Wake Forest	2	–	5	–	0	3	–	7	–	0
Virginia	1	–	5	–	0	3	–	7	–	0
$ – Conference champion; Rankings from AP Poll

The 1969 Maryland Terrapins football team represented the University of Maryland in the 1969 NCAA University Division football season. In their first season under head coach Roy Lester, the Terrapins compiled a 3–7 record (3–3 in conference), finished in sixth place in the Atlantic Coast Conference, and were outscored by their opponents 249 to 100. The team's statistical leaders included Jeff Shugars with 716 passing yards, Tom Miller with 629 rushing yards, and Roland Merritt with 499 receiving yards.

== Schedule ==
Date	Time	Opponent	Site	Result	Attendance	Source
September 20		at West Virginia*	Mountaineer Field; Morgantown, WV (rivalry)	L 7–31	31,000	
September 27		NC State	Byrd Stadium; College Park, MD	L 7–24	28,400	
October 4		at Wake Forest	Groves Stadium; Winston-Salem, NC	W 19–14	15,300	
October 11		Syracuse*	Byrd Stadium; College Park, MD	L 9–20	23,400	
October 18		Duke	Byrd Stadium; College Park, MD	W 20–7	26,700	
October 25		at South Carolina	Carolina Stadium; Columbia, SC	L 0–17	42,756	
November 1		at Clemson	Memorial Stadium; Clemson, SC	L 0–40	22,000	
November 8	1:30 p.m.	Miami (OH)*	Byrd Stadium; College Park, MD	L 21–34	20,000	
November 15		at No. 5 Penn State*	Beaver Stadium; University Park, PA (rivalry)	L 0–48	46,106	
November 22		Virginia	Byrd Stadium; College Park, MD (rivalry)	W 17–14	22,000	
*Non-conference game; Rankings from AP Poll released prior to the game; All times are in Eastern time

== Roster ==
1969 Maryland Terrapins football team roster
Players
Coaches
Offense

Pos.	#	Name	Class
WR	22	Larry Marshall	So

Defense

Pos.	#	Name	Class
DB	30	Tony Greene	Jr
DE	71	Guy Roberts	So

Special teams

Pos.	#	Name	Class

Head coach

- Roy Lester

Coordinators/assistant coaches

- Bob Brush
  (Graduate assistant)

Legend

- (C) Team captain
- (S) Suspended
- (I) Ineligible
- Injured
- Redshirt
