= 1969 Furman Paladins football team =

American college football season

1969 Furman Paladins football
- Conference: Southern Conference
- Record: 1–8–1 (0–4 SoCon)
- Head coach: Bob King (12th season)
- Captains: Tommy Broadwell; Dick Immel
- Home stadium: Sirrine Stadium

1969 Southern Conference football standings
	Conf.					Overall
Team	W		L		T	W		L		T
Davidson +	5	–	1	–	0	7	–	4	–	0
Richmond +	5	–	1	–	0	6	–	4	–	0
The Citadel	4	–	2	–	0	7	–	3	–	0
William & Mary	2	–	2	–	0	3	–	7	–	0
East Carolina	1	–	3	–	0	2	–	7	–	0
Furman	0	–	4	–	0	1	–	8	–	1
VMI	0	–	4	–	0	0	–	10	–	0
+ – Conference co-champions

The 1969 Furman Paladins football team was an American football team that represented Furman University as a member of the Southern Conference (SoCon) during the 1969 NCAA University Division football season. In their twelfth season under head coach Bob King, Furman compiled a 1–8–1 record, with a mark of 0–4 in conference play, placing tied for sixth in the SoCon.

== Schedule ==
Date	Opponent	Site	Result	Attendance	Source
September 20	at Presbyterian*	Bailey Stadium; Clinton, SC	W 14–12		
September 27	Davidson	Sirrine Stadium; Greenville, SC	L 14–77		
October 4	Carson–Newman*	Sirrine Stadium; Greenville, SC	T 21–21		
October 11	at Wofford*	Snyder Field; Spartanburg, SC (rivalry)	L 7–49		
October 18	at Samford*	Seibert Stadium; Homewood, AL	L 14–34		
November 1	at East Carolina	Ficklen Memorial Stadium; Greenville, NC	L 21–24	2,000	
November 8	at Richmond	City Stadium; Richmond, VA	L 0–37		
November 15	at The Citadel	Johnson Hagood Stadium; Charleston, SC (rivalry)	L 21–37	17,350	
November 22	Mississippi College*	Sirrine Stadium; Greenville, SC	L 19–21		
November 27	Wofford*	Sirrine Stadium; Greenville, SC (rivalry)	L 21–31		
*Non-conference game
