= 1969 Louisville Cardinals football team =

American college football season

1969 Louisville Cardinals football
- Conference: Missouri Valley Conference
- Record: 5–4–1 (2–3 MVC)
- Head coach: Lee Corso (1st season)
- Home stadium: Fairgrounds Stadium

1969 Missouri Valley Conference football standings
	Conf.					Overall
Team	W		L		T	W		L		T
Memphis State $	5	–	0	–	0	8	–	2	–	0
North Texas State	4	–	1	–	0	7	–	3	–	0
Louisville	2	–	3	–	0	5	–	4	–	1
Cincinnati	2	–	3	–	0	4	–	6	–	0
Wichita State	1	–	4	–	0	2	–	8	–	0
Tulsa	1	–	4	–	0	1	–	9	–	0
$ – Conference champion; Memphis State and Wichita State's games against Florida State counted in the conference standings.

The 1969 Louisville Cardinals football team was an American football team that represented the University of Louisville in the Missouri Valley Conference (MVC) during the 1969 NCAA University Division football season. In their first season under head coach Lee Corso, the Cardinals compiled an 5–4–1 record (2–3 against conference opponents) and were outscored by a total of 273 to 206.

The team's statistical leaders included Gary Inman with 843 passing yards, Lee Bouggess with 1,064 rushing yards and 36 points scored, and Cookie Brinkman with 357 receiving yards.

== Schedule ==
Date	Time	Opponent	Site	Result	Attendance	Source
September 13	1:30 p.m.	at Drake*	Drake Stadium; Des Moines, IA	T 24–24	8,500	
September 20		Southern Illinois*	Fairgrounds Stadium; Louisville, KY	W 17–13	9,928	
October 4	6:55 p.m.	Dayton*	Fairgrounds Stadium; Louisville, KY	W 24–17	11,099	
October 18	8:03 p.m.	Marshall*	Fairgrounds Stadium; Louisville, KY	W 34–17	8,206	
October 25	3:00 p.m.	at North Texas State	Fouts Field; Denton, TX	L 13–31	6,000	
November 1		at Kent State*	Memorial Stadium; Kent, OH	L 6–35	2,000	
November 8	2:00 p.m.	Cincinnati	Fairgrounds Stadium; Louisville, KY (rivalry)	L 21–31	10,361	
November 15	6:56 p.m.	Wichita State	Fairgrounds Stadium; Louisville, KY	W 13–7	5,209	
November 22		at Memphis State	Memphis Memorial Stadium; Memphis, TN (rivalry)	L 19–69	18,344	
November 27		at Tulsa	Skelly Field; Tulsa, OK	W 35–29	12,750	
*Non-conference game; All times are in Eastern time

== Roster ==
1969 Louisville Cardinals football team roster
Players
Coaches
Offense

Pos.	#	Name	Class
TE	48	Larry Ball	So
TE		Cookie Brinkman	Jr
RB		Lee Bouggess	Sr

Defense

Pos.	#	Name	Class
DT	74	Horace Jones	Jr
LB	65	Amos Martin	So
DE	56	Tom Mihm	So
LB		Cleo Walker	Sr

Special teams

Pos.	#	Name	Class

Head coach

- Lee Corso

Coordinators/assistant coaches

- Joe Perella – Running backs/tight ends

Legend

- (C) Team captain
- (S) Suspended
- (I) Ineligible
- Injured
- Redshirt
