= 1969 Wake Forest Demon Deacons football team =

American college football season

1969 Wake Forest Demon Deacons football
- Conference: Atlantic Coast Conference
- Record: 3–7 (2–5 ACC)
- Head coach: Cal Stoll (1st season)
- Offensive coordinator: Tom Moore (1st season)
- Captain: Game captains
- Home stadium: Groves Stadium

1969 Atlantic Coast Conference football standings
	Conf.					Overall
Team	W		L		T	W		L		T
South Carolina $	6	–	0	–	0	7	–	4	–	0
NC State	3	–	2	–	1	3	–	6	–	1
North Carolina	3	–	3	–	0	5	–	5	–	0
Clemson	3	–	3	–	0	4	–	6	–	0
Duke	3	–	3	–	1	3	–	6	–	1
Maryland	3	–	3	–	0	3	–	7	–	0
Wake Forest	2	–	5	–	0	3	–	7	–	0
Virginia	1	–	5	–	0	3	–	7	–	0
$ – Conference champion; Rankings from AP Poll

The 1969 Wake Forest Demon Deacons football team was an American football team that represented Wake Forest University during the 1969 NCAA University Division football season. In their first season under head coach Cal Stoll, the Demon Deacons compiled a 3–7 record and finished in seventh place in the Atlantic Coast Conference.

== Schedule ==
Date	Time	Opponent	Site	Result	Attendance	Source
September 13		at NC State	Carter Stadium; Raleigh, NC (rivalry)	W 22–21	36,900	
September 20		at No. 20 Auburn*	Cliff Hare Stadium; Auburn, AL	L 0–57	35,000	
September 27		Virginia Tech*	Groves Stadium; Winston-Salem, NC	W 16–10	20,000	
October 4		Maryland	Groves Stadium; Winston-Salem, NC	L 14–19	15,300	
October 11		Duke	Groves Stadium; Winston-Salem, NC (rivalry)	L 20–27	21,000	
October 18		at Clemson	Memorial Stadium; Clemson, SC	L 14–28	29,031	
October 25		at North Carolina	Kenan Memorial Stadium; Chapel Hill, NC (rivalry)	L 3–23	31,500	
November 8		at Virginia	Scott Stadium; Charlottesville, VA	W 23–21	15,000	
November 15		South Carolina	Groves Stadium; Winston-Salem, NC	L 6–24	25,000	
November 21	8:15 p.m.	at Miami (FL)*	Miami Orange Bowl; Miami, FL	L 7–49	24,817	
*Non-conference game; Rankings from AP Poll released prior to the game; All times are in Eastern time

== Team leaders ==
Category	Team Leader	Att/Cth	Yds
Passing	Larry Russell	70/153	794
Rushing	Larry Russell	187	471
Receiving	Gary Winrow	27	277
