= 1969 Virginia Cavaliers football team =

American college football season

1969 Virginia Cavaliers football
- Conference: Atlantic Coast Conference
- Record: 3–7 (1–5 ACC)
- Head coach: George Blackburn (5th season)
- Captains: Fred Moschel; Bob Rannigan
- Home stadium: Scott Stadium

1969 Atlantic Coast Conference football standings
| | Conf. | | | | | Overall |
| Team | W | | L | | T | W | | L | | T |
|---|---|---|---|---|---|---|---|---|---|---|
| South Carolina $ | 6 | – | 0 | – | 0 | 7 | – | 4 | – | 0 |
| NC State | 3 | – | 2 | – | 1 | 3 | – | 6 | – | 1 |
| North Carolina | 3 | – | 3 | – | 0 | 5 | – | 5 | – | 0 |
| Clemson | 3 | – | 3 | – | 0 | 4 | – | 6 | – | 0 |
| Duke | 3 | – | 3 | – | 1 | 3 | – | 6 | – | 1 |
| Maryland | 3 | – | 3 | – | 0 | 3 | – | 7 | – | 0 |
| Wake Forest | 2 | – | 5 | – | 0 | 3 | – | 7 | – | 0 |
| Virginia | 1 | – | 5 | – | 0 | 3 | – | 7 | – | 0 |
$ – Conference champion; Rankings from AP Poll

The 1969 Virginia Cavaliers football team represented the University of Virginia during the 1969 NCAA University Division football season. The Cavaliers were led by fifth-year head coach George Blackburn and played their home games at Scott Stadium in Charlottesville, Virginia. They competed as members of the Atlantic Coast Conference, finishing in last.

== Schedule ==
| Date | Time | Opponent | Site | Result | Attendance | Source |
|---|---|---|---|---|---|---|
| September 20 | | Clemson | Scott Stadium; Charlottesville, VA | L 14–21 | 18,000 | |
| September 27 | | Duke^{†} | Scott Stadium; Charlottesville, VA | W 10–0 | 25,000 | |
| October 4 | | at William & Mary* | Cary Field; Williamsburg, VA | W 28–15 | 12,500 | |
| October 11 | | vs. VMI* | City Stadium; Richmond, VA (Tobacco Bowl) | W 28–10 | 18,000 | |
| October 18 | | NC State | Scott Stadium; Charlottesville, VA | L 0–31 | 26,000 | |
| October 25 | 2:00 p.m. | at Navy* | Navy–Marine Corps Memorial Stadium; Annapolis, MD | L 0–10 | 26,412 | |
| November 1 | | North Carolina | Scott Stadium; Charlottesville, VA (South's Oldest Rivalry) | L 0–12 | 19,000 | |
| November 8 | | Wake Forest | Scott Stadium; Charlottesville, VA | L 21–23 | 15,000 | |
| November 15 | | at Tulane* | Tulane Stadium; New Orleans, LA | L 0–31 | 9,650 | |
| November 22 | | at Maryland | Byrd Stadium; College Park, MD (rivalry) | L 14–17 | 22,000 | |
*Non-conference game; ^{†}Homecoming; All times are in Eastern time
