= 1969 North Carolina Tar Heels football team =

American college football season

1969 North Carolina Tar Heels football
- Conference: Atlantic Coast Conference
- Record: 5–5 (3–3 ACC)
- Head coach: Bill Dooley (3rd season)
- Offensive coordinator: Bobby Collins (3rd season)
- Defensive coordinator: Lee Hayley (3rd season)
- Captains: Sam Bounds; Ed Chalupka; Bob Hanna; Don Hartig; David Jackson; Ken Price; Saulis Zemaitis
- Home stadium: Kenan Memorial Stadium

1969 Atlantic Coast Conference football standings
	Conf.					Overall
Team	W		L		T	W		L		T
South Carolina $	6	–	0	–	0	7	–	4	–	0
NC State	3	–	2	–	1	3	–	6	–	1
North Carolina	3	–	3	–	0	5	–	5	–	0
Clemson	3	–	3	–	0	4	–	6	–	0
Duke	3	–	3	–	1	3	–	6	–	1
Maryland	3	–	3	–	0	3	–	7	–	0
Wake Forest	2	–	5	–	0	3	–	7	–	0
Virginia	1	–	5	–	0	3	–	7	–	0
$ – Conference champion; Rankings from AP Poll

The 1969 North Carolina Tar Heels football team represented the University of North Carolina at Chapel Hill during the 1969 NCAA University Division football season. The Tar Heels were led by third-year head coach Bill Dooley and played their home games at Kenan Memorial Stadium in Chapel Hill, North Carolina. They competed as members of the Atlantic Coast Conference, finishing in third.

== Schedule ==
Date	Time	Opponent	Site	Result	Attendance	Source
September 20	1:30 p.m.	at NC State	Carter Stadium; Raleigh, NC (rivalry)	L 3–10	32,000	
September 27	7:30 p.m.	at South Carolina	Carolina Stadium; Columbia, SC (rivalry)	L 6–14	42,559	
October 4	1:30 p.m.	Vanderbilt*	Kenan Memorial Stadium; Chapel Hill, NC	W 38–22	30,000	
October 11	1:30 p.m.	Air Force*	Kenan Memorial Stadium; Chapel Hill, NC	L 10–20	37,500	
October 18	2:00 p.m.	at No. 10 Florida*	Florida Field; Gainesville, FL	L 2–52	62,945	
October 25	1:30 p.m.	Wake Forest	Kenan Memorial Stadium; Chapel Hill, NC (rivalry)	W 23–3	31,500	
November 1	1:30 p.m.	at Virginia	Scott Stadium; Charlottesville, VA (South's Oldest Rivalry)	W 12–0	19,000	
November 8	1:30 p.m.	VMI*	Kenan Memorial Stadium; Chapel Hill, NC	W 61–11	29,500	
November 15	1:30 p.m.	Clemson	Kenan Memorial Stadium; Chapel Hill, NC	W 32–15	32,500	
November 22	1:30 p.m.	at Duke	Wallace Wade Stadium; Durham, NC (Victory Bell)	L 13–17	44,000	
*Non-conference game; Rankings from AP Poll released prior to the game; All times are in Eastern time

== Roster ==
1969 North Carolina Tar Heels football team roster
Players			Coaches
Offense: Pos. / # / Name / Class; RB / 23 / Don McCauley / Jr	Defense: Pos. / # / Name / Class	Special teams: Pos. / # / Name / Class	Head coach: Bill Dooley; Coordinators/assistant coaches Legend: (C) Team captain; (S) Suspended; (I) Ineligible; Injured; Redshirt
