= 1969 Peach Bowl =

American college football game

- 2nd Peach Bowl
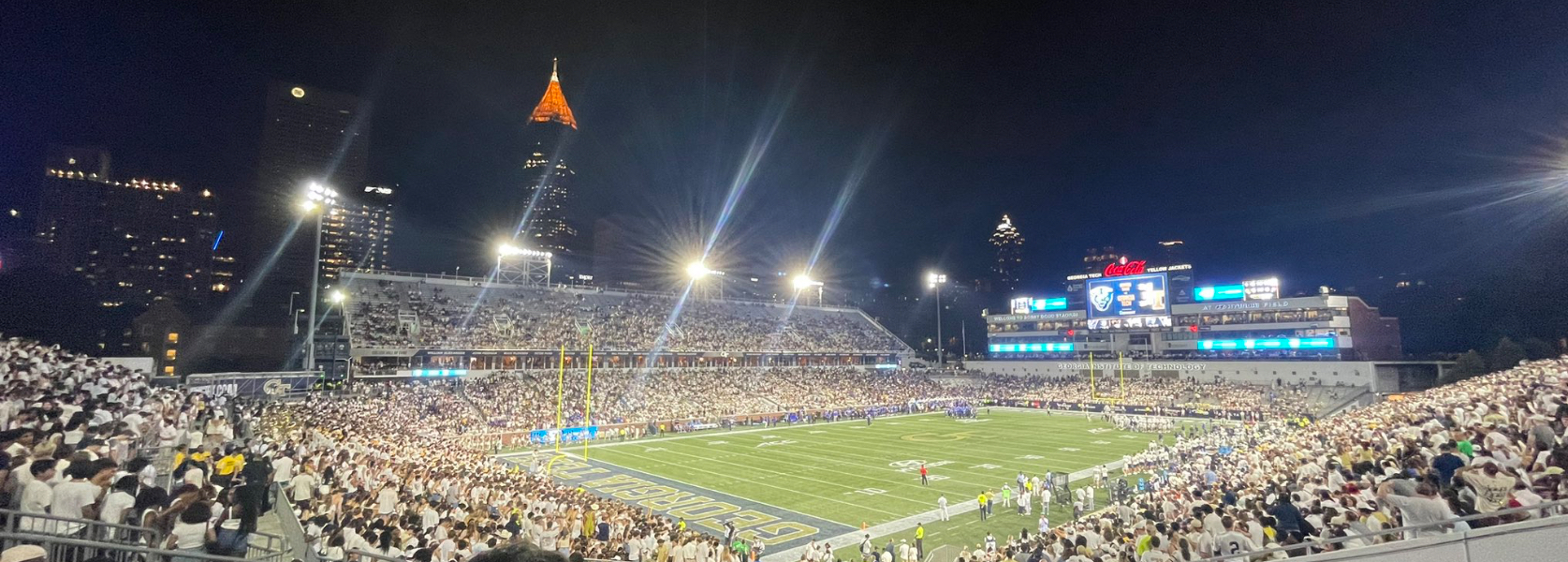
- Grant Field in Atlanta, Georgia, hosted the Peach Bowl.
West Virginia Mountaineers	South Carolina Gamecocks
(9–1)	(7–3)
Independent	ACC
14	3
Head coach: Jim Carlen	Head coach: Paul Dietzel
AP / Coaches; 19 / 18
	1	2	3	4	Total
West Virginia	7	0	0	7	14
South Carolina	0	3	0	0	3
- Date: December 30, 1969
- Season: 1969
- Stadium: Grant Field
- Location: Atlanta, Georgia
- MVP: FB Ed Williams; MG Carl Crennel
- Referee: John Lindsay (ACC; split crew: ACC, ECAC)
- Attendance: 48,452

United States TV coverage
- Network: Sports Network Incorporated
- Announcers: Jack Drees and Pat Summerall

The 1969 Peach Bowl was a college football postseason bowl game between the West Virginia Mountaineers football and the South Carolina Gamecocks football. It was the second ever Peach Bowl game.

== Background ==
This was West Virginia's first bowl appearance since 1964. The Gamecocks were champion of the Atlantic Coast Conference for the first time ever, making their first bowl appearance since 1946.

== Game summary ==
Eddie Williams ran for 208 yards on 35 carries as West Virginia prevailed with a newly installed wishbone offense in a rain soaked game. The Mountaineers attempted only two passes the whole game, but the team ran for 346 yards and forced three turnovers. Bob Gresham had a 10-yard touchdown run to give the Mountaineers a 7–0 lead in the first. Bill Dupree's field goal proved to be the only points the Gamecocks scored all day. One key play occurred as South Carolina attempted to take the lead with the ball at the Mountaineer 7. They were stuffed and held to no points as the Mountaineers scored with :23 remaining on a Jim Braxton touchdown plunge to seal the win. The win sealed West Virginia's first 10-win season since 1922.

== Aftermath ==
The Mountaineers reached the Peach Bowl again in 1972. The Gamecocks reached the Peach Bowl 31 years later, in 2010.
