= 1969 Memphis State Tigers football team =

American college football season

1969 Memphis State Tigers football

MVC champion
- Conference: Missouri Valley Conference
- Record: 8–2 (5–0 MVC)
- Head coach: Billy J. Murphy (12th season)
- Home stadium: Memphis Memorial Stadium

1969 Missouri Valley Conference football standings
	Conf.					Overall
Team	W		L		T	W		L		T
Memphis State $	5	–	0	–	0	8	–	2	–	0
North Texas State	4	–	1	–	0	7	–	3	–	0
Louisville	2	–	3	–	0	5	–	4	–	1
Cincinnati	2	–	3	–	0	4	–	6	–	0
Wichita State	1	–	4	–	0	2	–	8	–	0
Tulsa	1	–	4	–	0	1	–	9	–	0
$ – Conference champion; Memphis State and Wichita State's games against Florida State counted in the conference standings.

The 1969 Memphis State Tigers football team represented Memphis State University (now known as the University of Memphis) as a member of the Missouri Valley Conference (MVC) during the 1969 NCAA University Division football season. In their 12th season under head coach Billy J. Murphy, the Tigers compiled an 8–2 record (5–0 against conference opponents), won the MVC championship, and outscored opponents by a total of 328 to 191. The team played home games at Memphis Memorial Stadium in Memphis, Tennessee.

The team's statistical leaders included Danny Pierce with 1,049 passing yards, Paul Gowen with 715 rushing yards, Frank Blackwell with 591 receiving yards, and Jay McCoy with 48 points scored.

== Schedule ==
Date	Time	Opponent	Site	Result	Attendance	Source
September 20		at No. 9 Ole Miss*	Hemingway Stadium; Oxford, MS (rivalry)	L 3–28	34,876	
September 27		North Texas State	Memphis Memorial Stadium; Memphis, TN	W 15–13	28,077	
October 4		No. 10 Tennessee*	Memphis Memorial Stadium; Memphis, TN	L 16–55	50,164	
October 11	7:00 p.m.	at Cincinnati	Nippert Stadium; Cincinnati, OH (rivalry)	W 52–6	7,712	
October 18		Miami (FL)*	Memphis Memorial Stadium; Memphis, TN	W 26–13	28,506	
October 25		at Utah State*	Romney Stadium; Logan, UT	W 40–0	14,505	
November 1		Tulsa^{†}	Memphis Memorial Stadium; Memphis, TN	W 42–24	23,003	
November 8		Southern Miss*	Memphis Memorial Stadium; Memphis, TN (Black and Blue Bowl)	W 37–7	18,808	
November 15	6:30 p.m.	at Florida State (Note: Memphis State's game against Florida State counted in the MVC standings.)	Doak Campbell Stadium; Tallahassee, FL	W 28–26	28,532	
November 22		Louisville	Memphis Memorial Stadium; Memphis, TN (rivalry)	W 69–19	18,344	
*Non-conference game; ^{†}Homecoming; Rankings from AP Poll released prior to the game; All times are in Central time
