= 1969 Miami Redskins football team =

American college football season

1969 Miami Redskins football
- Conference: Mid-American Conference
- Record: 7–3 (2–3 MAC)
- Head coach: Bill Mallory (1st season)
- MVP: Dick Adams
- Captains: Kent Thompson; Merv Nugent
- Home stadium: Miami Field

1969 Mid-American Conference football standings
	Conf.					Overall
Team	W		L		T	W		L		T
Toledo $	5	–	0	–	0	11	–	0	–	0
Bowling Green	4	–	1	–	0	6	–	4	–	0
Miami (OH)	2	–	3	–	0	7	–	3	–	0
Ohio	2	–	3	–	0	5	–	4	–	1
Kent State	1	–	4	–	0	5	–	5	–	0
Western Michigan	1	–	4	–	0	4	–	6	–	0
$ – Conference champion

The 1969 Miami Redskins football team was an American football team that represented Miami University in the Mid-American Conference (MAC) during the 1969 NCAA University Division football season. In their first season under head coach Bill Mallory, Miami compiled a 7–3 record (2–3 against MAC opponents), finished in a tie for third second place in the MAC, and outscored all opponents by a combined total of 231 to 139.

The team's statistical leaders included quarterback Jim Bengala with 1,276 passing yards, Cleveland Dickerson with 622 rushing yards, and end Mike Palija with 567 receiving yards.

Dick Adams won the Miami most valuable player award. Kent Thompson and Merv Nugent were the team captains.

== Schedule ==
Date	Time	Opponent	Site	Result	Attendance	Source
September 13		Xavier*	Miami Field; Oxford, OH	W 35–7	13,269	
September 20	8:00 p.m.	at Dayton*	Baujan Field; Dayton, OH	W 19–9	10,500	
September 27	1:30 p.m.	at Western Michigan	Waldo Stadium; Kalamazoo, MI	W 24–20	18,500	
October 11		Marshall*	Miami Field; Oxford, OH	W 35–7	10,907	
October 18		Ohio	Miami Field; Oxford, OH (rivalry)	W 24–21	17,399	
October 25		at Bowling Green	Doyt Perry Stadium; Bowling Green, OH	L 0–3	21,465	
November 1		Toledo	Miami Field; Oxford, OH	L 10–14	13,213	
November 8	1:30 p.m.	at Maryland*	Byrd Stadium; College Park, MD	W 34–21	20,000	
November 15		at Kent State	Memorial Stadium; Kent, OH	L 14–17	> 1,000	
November 22	1:30 p.m.	at Cincinnati*	Nippert Stadium; Cincinnati, OH (rivalry)	W 36–20	9,783	
*Non-conference game; All times are in Eastern time
