= 1969 Wichita State Shockers football team =

American college football season

1969 Wichita State Shockers football
- Conference: Missouri Valley Conference
- Record: 2–8 (1–4 MVC)
- Head coach: Ben Wilson (1st season)
- Home stadium: Cessna Stadium

1969 Missouri Valley Conference football standings
	Conf.					Overall
Team	W		L		T	W		L		T
Memphis State $	5	–	0	–	0	8	–	2	–	0
North Texas State	4	–	1	–	0	7	–	3	–	0
Louisville	2	–	3	–	0	5	–	4	–	1
Cincinnati	2	–	3	–	0	4	–	6	–	0
Wichita State	1	–	4	–	0	2	–	8	–	0
Tulsa	1	–	4	–	0	1	–	9	–	0
$ – Conference champion; Memphis State and Wichita State's games against Florida State counted in the conference standings.

The 1969 Wichita Shockers football team was an American football team that represented Wichita State University as a member of the Missouri Valley Conference (MVC) during the 1969 NCAA University Division football season. In their first season under head coach Ben Wilson, the Shockers compiled a 2–8 record (1–3 against conference opponents), ties for fifth place in the MVC, and was outscored by a total of 273 to 121. The team played its home games at Veterans Field, now known as Cessna Stadium.

== Schedule ==
Date	Time	Opponent	Site	Result	Attendance	Source
September 13	1:30 p.m.	Utah State*	Cessna Stadium; Wichita, KS	W 17–7	28,248	
September 20	6:33 p.m.	at Florida State (Note: Wichita State's game against Florida State counted in the MVC standings.)	Doak Campbell Stadium; Tallahassee, FL	L 0–24	31,821	
September 27	2:30 p.m.	at Colorado State*	Hughes Stadium; Fort Collins, CO	L 21–50	20,751	
October 4	1:30 p.m.	West Texas State*	Cessna Stadium; Wichita, KS	L 14–24	15,145	
October 11	1:30 p.m.	New Mexico State*	Cessna Stadium; Wichita, KS	L 6–23	13,762	
October 18	12:30 p.m.	at Cincinnati	Nippert Stadium; Cincinnati, OH	L 14–21	8,416	
October 25	2:00 p.m.	at No. 4 Arkansas*	War Memorial Stadium; Little Rock, AR	L 14–52	36,000–36,178	
November 8	2:00 p.m.	at North Texas State	Fouts Field; Denton, TX	L 0–47	17,300	
November 15	5:56 p.m.	at Louisville	Cardinal Stadium; Louisville, KY	L 7–13	5,209	
November 22	1:30 p.m.	Tulsa	Cessna Stadium; Wichita, KS	W 28–12	19,878	
*Non-conference game; Rankings from AP Poll released prior to the game; All times are in Central time
