= 1969 Bowling Green Falcons football team =

American college football season

1969 Bowling Green Falcons football
- Conference: Mid-American Conference
- Record: 6–4 (4–1 MAC)
- Head coach: Don Nehlen (2nd season)
- Home stadium: Doyt Perry Stadium

1969 Mid-American Conference football standings
	Conf.					Overall
Team	W		L		T	W		L		T
Toledo $	5	–	0	–	0	11	–	0	–	0
Bowling Green	4	–	1	–	0	6	–	4	–	0
Miami (OH)	2	–	3	–	0	7	–	3	–	0
Ohio	2	–	3	–	0	5	–	4	–	1
Kent State	1	–	4	–	0	5	–	5	–	0
Western Michigan	1	–	4	–	0	4	–	6	–	0
$ – Conference champion

The 1969 Bowling Green Falcons football team was an American football team that represented Bowling Green University in the Mid-American Conference (MAC) during the 1969 NCAA University Division football season. In their second season under head coach Don Nehlen, the Falcons compiled a 6–4 record (4–1 against MAC opponents), finished in second place in the MAC, and outscored opponents by a combined total of 179 to 146.

The team's statistical leaders included Vern Wireman with 1,666 passing yards, Isaac Wright with 344 rushing yards, and Bob Zimpfer with 785 receiving yards.

== Schedule ==
Date	Time	Opponent	Site	Result	Attendance	Source
September 20	1:30 p.m.	Utah State*	Doyt Perry Stadium; Bowling Green, OH	L 6–14	14,644	
September 27	8:00 p.m.	at Dayton*	Baujan Field; Dayton, OH	W 27–7	12,238	
October 4		Western Michigan	Doyt Perry Stadium; Bowling Green, OH	W 21–10	11,623	
October 11		Toledo	Doyt Perry Stadium; Bowling Green, OH (rivalry)	L 26–27	20,820	
October 18		at Kent State	Memorial Stadium; Kent, OH (rivalry)	W 7–0	17,628	
October 25		Miami (OH)	Doyt Perry Stadium; Bowling Green, OH	W 3–0	21,465	
November 1		at Marshall*	Fairfield Stadium; Huntington, WV	L 16–21	6,000	
November 8		at Ohio	Peden Stadium; Athens, OH	W 23–16	16,203	
November 15	3:00 p.m.	at West Texas State*	Buffalo Bowl; Canyon, TX	L 12–28	12,000	
November 22		Northern Illinois*	Doyt Perry Stadium; Bowling Green, OH	W 38–23	7,864	
*Non-conference game; All times are in Eastern time
