= 1969 Richmond Spiders football team =

American college football season

1969 Richmond Spiders football

SoCon co-champion
- Conference: Southern Conference
- Record: 6–4 (5–1 SoCon)
- Head coach: Frank Jones (4th season)
- Home stadium: City Stadium

1969 Southern Conference football standings
	Conf.					Overall
Team	W		L		T	W		L		T
Davidson +	5	–	1	–	0	7	–	4	–	0
Richmond +	5	–	1	–	0	6	–	4	–	0
The Citadel	4	–	2	–	0	7	–	3	–	0
William & Mary	2	–	2	–	0	3	–	7	–	0
East Carolina	1	–	3	–	0	2	–	7	–	0
Furman	0	–	4	–	0	1	–	8	–	1
VMI	0	–	4	–	0	0	–	10	–	0
+ – Conference co-champions

The 1969 Richmond Spiders football team was an American football team that represented the University of Richmond as a member of the Southern Conference (SoCon) during the 1969 NCAA University Division football season. In their fourth season under head coach Frank Jones, Richmond compiled a 6–4 record, with a mark of 5–1 in conference play, finishing as finishing as SoCon co-champion.

== Schedule ==
Date	Opponent	Site	Result	Attendance	Source
September 20	at Mississippi State*	Scott Field; Starkville, MS	L 14–17	18,000	
September 27	at VMI	Alumni Memorial Field; Lexington, VA (rivalry)	W 20–0	8,000	
October 4	Virginia Tech*	City Stadium; Richmond, VA	W 17–10	20,000	
October 11	at Davidson	Richardson Stadium; Davidson, NC	L 7–37	9,500	
October 18	East Carolina	City Stadium; Richmond, VA	W 24–7	6,500	
October 25	at Southern Miss*	Faulkner Field; Hattiesburg, MS	L 28–31	11,000	
November 1	The Citadel	City Stadium; Richmond, VA	W 45–18	12,000	
November 8	Furman	City Stadium; Richmond, VA	W 37–0		
November 15	at West Virginia*	Mountaineer Field; Morgantown, WV	L 21–33	21,500	
November 22	at William & Mary	Cary Field; Williamsburg, VA (rivalry)	W 28–17	9,000	
*Non-conference game
