= 1969 Cincinnati Bearcats football team =

American college football season

1969 Cincinnati Bearcats football
- Conference: Missouri Valley Conference
- Record: 4–6 (2–3 MVC)
- Head coach: Ray Callahan (1st season)
- Captains: Bob Merkich; Jim Nelson
- Home stadium: Nippert Stadium

1969 Missouri Valley Conference football standings
	Conf.					Overall
Team	W		L		T	W		L		T
Memphis State $	5	–	0	–	0	8	–	2	–	0
North Texas State	4	–	1	–	0	7	–	3	–	0
Louisville	2	–	3	–	0	5	–	4	–	1
Cincinnati	2	–	3	–	0	4	–	6	–	0
Wichita State	1	–	4	–	0	2	–	8	–	0
Tulsa	1	–	4	–	0	1	–	9	–	0
$ – Conference champion; Memphis State and Wichita State's games against Florida State counted in the conference standings.

The 1969 Cincinnati Bearcats football team represented University of Cincinnati as a member of the Missouri Valley Conference (MVC) during the 1969 NCAA University Division football season. Led by first-year head coach Ray Callahan, the Bearcats compiled an overall record of 4–6 with a mark of 2–3 in conference play, tying for third place in the MVC. The team played home games at Nippert Stadium in Cincinnati.

== Schedule ==
Date	Time	Opponent	Site	Result	Attendance	Source
September 13	1:25 p.m.	at West Virginia*	Mountaineer Field; Morgantown, WV (rivalry)	L 11–57	31,500	
September 20	8:00 p.m.	William & Mary*	Nippert Stadium; Cincinnati, OH	W 26–18	7,099	
October 4	7:00 p.m.	Xavier*	Nippert Stadium; Cincinnati, OH (rivalry)	W 17–14	17,519	
October 11	8:00 p.m.	Memphis State	Nippert Stadium; Cincinnati, OH (rivalry)	L 6–52	7,712	
October 18	1:30 p.m.	Wichita State	Nippert Stadium; Cincinnati, OH	W 21–14	8,416	
October 25	2:30 p.m.	at Tulsa	Skelly Stadium; Tulsa, OK	L 24–40	12,000	
November 1	1:30 p.m.	North Texas State	Nippert Stadium; Cincinnati, OH	L 30–31	9,504	
November 8	2:00 p.m.	at Louisville	Fairgrounds Stadium; Louisville, KY (rivalry)	W 31–21	10,361	
November 15		at Ohio*	Peden Stadium; Athens, OH	L 6–46	5,823	
November 22	1:30 p.m.	Miami (OH)*	Nippert Stadium; Cincinnati, OH (Victory Bell)	L 20–36	9,783	
*Non-conference game; All times are in Eastern time
