= 1969 North Texas State Mean Green football team =

American college football season

1969 North Texas State Mean Green football
- Conference: Missouri Valley Conference
- Record: 7–3 (4–1 MVC)
- Head coach: Rod Rust (3rd season)
- Home stadium: Fouts Field

1969 Missouri Valley Conference football standings
	Conf.					Overall
Team	W		L		T	W		L		T
Memphis State $	5	–	0	–	0	8	–	2	–	0
North Texas State	4	–	1	–	0	7	–	3	–	0
Louisville	2	–	3	–	0	5	–	4	–	1
Cincinnati	2	–	3	–	0	4	–	6	–	0
Wichita State	1	–	4	–	0	2	–	8	–	0
Tulsa	1	–	4	–	0	1	–	9	–	0
$ – Conference champion; Memphis State and Wichita State's games against Florida State counted in the conference standings.

The 1969 North Texas State Mean Green football team was an American football team that represented North Texas State University (now known as the University of North Texas) during the 1969 NCAA University Division football season as a member of the Missouri Valley Conference. In their third year under head coach Rod Rust, the team compiled a 7–3 record.

Barry Moore ranked among the national leaders with 71 receptions (fourth nationally) for 1,130 yards (fifth nationally.

== Schedule ==
Date	Time	Opponent	Site	Result	Attendance	Source
September 20	7:30 p.m.	Southwestern Louisiana*	Fouts Field; Denton, TX	W 40–6	12,300	
September 27		at Memphis State	Memphis Memorial Stadium; Memphis, TN	L 13–15	28,077	
October 4		at Drake*	Drake Stadium; Des Moines, IA	L 23–27	15,000	
October 11	2:00 p.m.	Weber State*	Fouts Field; Denton, TX	W 35–13	2,000–5,000	
October 18	8:30 p.m.	at New Mexico State*	Memorial Stadium; Las Cruces, NM	W 30–12	17,776	
October 25	2:00 p.m.	Louisville	Fouts Field; Denton, TX	W 31–13	6,000	
November 1	12:30 p.m.	at Cincinnati	Nippert Stadium; Cincinnati, OH	W 31–30	9,504	
November 8	2:00 p.m.	Wichita State^{†}	Fouts Field; Denton, TX	W 47–0	17,300	
November 15	2:00 p.m.	Tulsa	Fouts Field; Denton, TX	W 42–16	5,000	
November 22	10:00 p.m.	at San Diego State*	San Diego Stadium; San Diego, CA	L 24–42	48,817	
*Non-conference game; ^{†}Homecoming; All times are in Central time
