= 1969 Duke Blue Devils football team =

American college football season

1969 Duke Blue Devils football
- Conference: Atlantic Coast Conference
- Record: 3–6–1 (3–3–1 ACC)
- Head coach: Tom Harp (4th season)
- Offensive coordinator: Jacque Hetrick (4th season)
- Defensive coordinator: George Hill (4th season)
- MVP: Leo Hart
- Captain: Jim Dearth
- Home stadium: Wallace Wade Stadium

1969 Atlantic Coast Conference football standings
	Conf.					Overall
Team	W		L		T	W		L		T
South Carolina $	6	–	0	–	0	7	–	4	–	0
NC State	3	–	2	–	1	3	–	6	–	1
North Carolina	3	–	3	–	0	5	–	5	–	0
Clemson	3	–	3	–	0	4	–	6	–	0
Duke	3	–	3	–	1	3	–	6	–	1
Maryland	3	–	3	–	0	3	–	7	–	0
Wake Forest	2	–	5	–	0	3	–	7	–	0
Virginia	1	–	5	–	0	3	–	7	–	0
$ – Conference champion; Rankings from AP Poll

The 1969 Duke Blue Devils football team was an American football team that represented Duke University as a member of the Atlantic Coast Conference (ACC) during the 1969 NCAA University Division football season. In their fourth year under head coach Tom Harp, the Blue Devils compiled an overall record of 3–6–1, with a conference record of 3–3–1, and finished fifth in the ACC.

== Schedule ==
Date	Opponent	Site	Result	Attendance	Source
September 20	at South Carolina	Carolina Stadium; Columbia, SC	L 20–27	42,791	
September 27	at Virginia	Scott Stadium; Charlottesville, VA	L 0–10	25,000	
October 4	Pittsburgh*	Wallace Wade Stadium; Durham, NC	L 12–14	18,000	
October 11	at Wake Forest	Groves Stadium; Winston-Salem, NC (rivalry)	W 27–20	21,000	
October 18	at Maryland	Byrd Stadium; College Park, MD	L 7–20	26,700	
October 25	at NC State	Carter Stadium; Raleigh, NC (rivalry)	T 25–25	32,700	
November 1	at Georgia Tech*	Grant Field; Atlanta, GA	L 7–20	41,113	
November 8	Clemson	Wallace Wade Stadium; Durham, NC	W 34–27	22,000	
November 15	vs. Virginia Tech*	Foreman Field; Norfolk, VA (Oyster Bowl)	L 12–48	23,000	
November 22	North Carolina^{†}	Wallace Wade Stadium; Durham, NC (Victory Bell)	W 17–13	44,000	
*Non-conference game; ^{†}Homecoming
