= 1969 Dayton Flyers football team =

American college football season

1969 Dayton Flyers football
- Conference: Independent
- Record: 3–7
- Head coach: John McVay (5th season)
- Home stadium: Baujan Field

1969 NCAA University Division independents football records
	Conf.			Overall
Team	W	L	T	W		L		T
No. 2 Penn State		–		11	–	0	–	0
No. 17 West Virginia		–		10	–	1	–	0
No. 12 Houston		–		9	–	2	–	0
No. 5 Notre Dame		–		8	–	2	–	1
Buffalo		–		6	–	3	–	0
Rutgers		–		6	–	3	–	0
Villanova		–		6	–	3	–	0
Florida State		–		6	–	3	–	1
Colgate		–		5	–	3	–	1
Air Force		–		6	–	4	–	0
West Texas State		–		6	–	4	–	0
Boston College		–		5	–	4	–	0
New Mexico State		–		5	–	5	–	0
Southern Miss		–		5	–	5	–	0
Syracuse		–		5	–	5	–	0
Army		–		4	–	5	–	1
Virginia Tech		–		4	–	5	–	1
Georgia Tech		–		4	–	6	–	0
Miami (FL)		–		4	–	6	–	0
Pittsburgh		–		4	–	6	–	0
Dayton		–		3	–	7	–	0
Marshall		–		3	–	7	–	0
Northern Illinois		–		3	–	7	–	0
Tulane		–		3	–	7	–	0
Utah State		–		3	–	7	–	0
Navy		–		1	–	9	–	0
Xavier		–		1	–	9	–	0
Rankings from AP Poll

The 1969 Dayton Flyers football team represented the University of Dayton as an independent during the 1969 NCAA University Division football season. In their fifth season under head coach John McVay, the Flyers compiled a 3–7 record. Dayton played their home games at Baujan Field in Dayton, Ohio.

== Schedule ==
Date	Time	Opponent	Site	Result	Attendance	Source
September 13	1:30 p.m.	at Kent State	Memorial Stadium; Kent, OH	L 14–24	8,172	
September 20	8:00 p.m.	Miami (OH)	Baujan Field; Dayton, OH	L 9–19	10,500	
September 27	8:00 p.m.	Bowling Green	Baujan Field; Dayton, OH	L 7–27	12,238	
October 4	6:55 p.m.	at Louisville	Fairgrounds Stadium; Louisville, KY	L 17–24	11,099	
October 11		at Buffalo	Rotary Field; Buffalo, NY	L 0–27	4,599	
October 18	1:30 p.m.	Northern Illinois	Baujan Field; Dayton, OH	W 56–24	13,483	
October 25	1:30 p.m.	No. 9 Akron	Baujan Field; Dayton, OH	L 10–14	10,422	
November 1	1:30 p.m.	Xavier	Baujan Field; Dayton, OH	W 32–14	7,632	
November 8	1:30 p.m.	at Villanova	Villanova Stadium; Villanova, PA	W 27–20	12,173	
November 15	8:00 p.m.	at Toledo	Glass Bowl; Toledo, OH	L 0–20	9,318	
Rankings from Coaches' Poll released prior to the game; All times are in Eastern time
