= 1969 Davidson Wildcats football team =

American college football season

1969 Davidson Wildcats football

SoCon co-champion

Tangerine Bowl, L 33–56 vs. Toledo
- Conference: Southern Conference
- Record: 7–4 (5–1 SoCon)
- Head coach: Homer Smith (5th season)
- Home stadium: Richardson Stadium

1969 Southern Conference football standings
	Conf.					Overall
Team	W		L		T	W		L		T
Davidson +	5	–	1	–	0	7	–	4	–	0
Richmond +	5	–	1	–	0	6	–	4	–	0
The Citadel	4	–	2	–	0	7	–	3	–	0
William & Mary	2	–	2	–	0	3	–	7	–	0
East Carolina	1	–	3	–	0	2	–	7	–	0
Furman	0	–	4	–	0	1	–	8	–	1
VMI	0	–	4	–	0	0	–	10	–	0
+ – Conference co-champions

The 1969 Davidson Wildcats football team was an American football team that represented Davidson College in the Southern Conference (SoCon) during the 1969 NCAA University Division football season. In their fifth season under head coach Homer Smith, the Wildcats compiled a 7–4 record (5–1 against conference opponents), won the conference championship, and lost to Toledo in the 1969 Tangerine Bowl.

== Schedule ==
Date	Opponent	Site	Result	Attendance	Source
September 20	at Guilford*	Greensboro H.S. Stadium; Greensboro, NC	W 21–8	700	
September 27	at Furman	Sirrine Stadium; Greenville, SC	W 77–14		
October 4	at Trinity (TX)*	Alamo Stadium; San Antonio, TX	W 17–16	1,756	
October 11	Richmond	Richardson Stadium; Davidson, NC	W 37–7	9,500	
October 18	at William & Mary	Cary Field; Williamsburg, VA	W 17–15	11,500	
October 25	at The Citadel	Johnson Hagood Stadium; Charleston, SC	L 28–34	21,573	
November 1	VMI	Richardson Stadium; Davidson, NC	W 59–6	6,900	
November 8	at East Carolina	Ficklen Memorial Stadium; Greenville, NC	W 42–27	15,337	
November 15	Wofford*	Richardson Stadium; Davidson, NC	L 27–28	8,000	
November 22	at Vanderbilt*	Dudley Field; Nashville, TN	L 8–63	15,371	
December 26	vs. No. 20 Toledo*	Tangerine Bowl; Orlando, FL (Tangerine Bowl)	L 33–56	16,311	
*Non-conference game; Rankings from AP Poll released prior to the game
