= 1969 Toledo Rockets football team =

American college football season

1969 Toledo Rockets football

MAC champion Tangerine Bowl champion

Tangerine Bowl, W 56–33 vs. Davidson
- Conference: Mid-American Conference
- Record: 11–0 (5–0 MAC)
- Head coach: Frank Lauterbur (7th season)
- Captains: Curtis Johnson; Dave Penn; Jim Rance
- Home stadium: Glass Bowl

1969 Mid-American Conference football standings
	Conf.					Overall
Team	W		L		T	W		L		T
Toledo $	5	–	0	–	0	11	–	0	–	0
Bowling Green	4	–	1	–	0	6	–	4	–	0
Miami (OH)	2	–	3	–	0	7	–	3	–	0
Ohio	2	–	3	–	0	5	–	4	–	1
Kent State	1	–	4	–	0	5	–	5	–	0
Western Michigan	1	–	4	–	0	4	–	6	–	0
$ – Conference champion

The 1969 Toledo Rockets football team was an American football team that represented the University of Toledo in the Mid-American Conference (MAC) during the 1969 NCAA University Division football season. In their seventh season under head coach Frank Lauterbur, the Rockets compiled an 11–0 record (5–0 against MAC opponents), outscored all opponents by a combined total of 385 to 160, and won the MAC championship. The season began with a 45–18 victory over Villanova and concluded with a 56–33 victory over Southern Conference champion Davidson in the 1969 Tangerine Bowl. The Rockets were ranked No. 20 in the final AP Poll taken before bowl games. The defense led the way for the 1969 team, allowing only eight rushing touchdowns and intercepting 22 passes in eleven games.

The 1969 season marked the beginning of a 35-game winning streak that consisted of three consecutive seasons from 1969 through 1971. During the streak, Toledo won three consecutive MAC championships and three consecutive bowl games, led the nation in total defense all three years, and outscored opponents by a combined total of 1,152 to 344. It remains the second longest winning streak in modern Division I-A college football history behind Oklahoma's 47-game streak in the 1950s.

Cornerback Curtis Johnson, who intercepted seven passes in 1969, received first-team All-America honors from the Newspaper Enterprise Association and second-team honors from the Associated Press. Eight Toledo players received first-team All-MAC honors: Curtis Johnson, quarterback Chuck Ealey, tailback Tony Harris, defensive tackles Mel Long and Jim Rance, defensive end Jim Tyler, linebacker John Niezgoda, and placekicker Ken Krots.

Chuck Ealey was named MAC Back of the Year, and Frank Lauterbur was named MAC Coach of the Year. Ken Crots, who converted six of 18 field goal attempts, won the Jim Nicholson Award as the player contributing the most to the team's success. The team captains were Curtis Johnson, Dave Penn, and Jim Rance.

The team's statistical leaders included Chuck Ealey with 1,428 passing yards, Tony Harris with 889 rushing yards (including 217 in the season opener against Villanova), Don Fair with 469 receiving yards, Charles Cole with 78 points scored, and John Niezgoda with 201 tackles.

The Rockets played their home game in the Glass Bowl. The attendance at five home games was 75,282, an average of 15,056 per game.

== Schedule ==
Date	Time	Opponent	Rank	Site	Result	Attendance	Source
September 20	8:00 p.m.	Villanova*		Glass Bowl; Toledo, OH	W 45–18	14,987	
September 27	8:00 p.m.	at Marshall*		Fairfield Stadium; Huntington, WV	W 38–13	7,000	
October 4	8:00 p.m.	Ohio		Glass Bowl; Toledo, OH	W 34–9	19,223	
October 11		at Bowling Green		Doyt Perry Stadium; Bowling Green, OH (rivalry)	W 27–26	20,820	
October 18		Western Michigan^{†}		Glass Bowl; Toledo, OH	W 38–13	16,823	
October 25		Kent State		Glass Bowl; Toledo, OH	W 43–17	14,931	
November 1		at Miami (OH)		Miami Field; Oxford, OH	W 14–10	13,213	
November 8	2:30 p.m.	at Northern Illinois*		Huskie Stadium; DeKalb, IL	W 35–21	11,483	
November 15	8:00 p.m.	Dayton*		Glass Bowl; Toledo, OH	W 20–0	9,318	
November 22	1:30 p.m.	at Xavier*	No. 20	Corcoran Stadium; Cincinnati, OH	W 35–0	2,281	
December 26		vs. Davidson*	No. 20	Tangerine Bowl; Orlando, FL (Tangerine Bowl)	W 56–33	16,311	
*Non-conference game; ^{†}Homecoming; Rankings from AP Poll released prior to the game; All times are in Eastern time

== After the season ==
=== NFL draft ===
The following Rockets were selected in the 1970 NFL draft following the season.

Round	Pick	Player	Position	NFL club
4	81	Curtis Johnson	Defensive back	Miami Dolphins
6	137	James Manuel	Tackle	St. Louis Cardinals
11	269	Danny Crockett	Wide receiver	San Francisco 49ers
