= 1969 Tangerine Bowl =

American college football game

Davidson Wildcats	Toledo Rockets
(7–3)	(10–0)
Southern Conference	MAC
33	56
Head coach: Homer Smith	Head coach: Frank Lauterbur
	AP / Coaches; 20 / NR
	1	2	3	4	Total
Davidson	13	0	20	0	33
Toledo	21	14	14	7	56
- Date: December 26, 1969
- Season: 1969
- Stadium: Tangerine Bowl
- Location: Orlando, Florida
- MVP: Chuck Ealey, Toledo (back); Dan Crockett, Toledo (lineman)
- Favorite: Toledo
- Referee: Frank Baird (MAC; split crew: MAC, Southern)
- Attendance: 16,311

The 1969 Tangerine Bowl was held on December 26, 1969, at the Tangerine Bowl stadium in Orlando, Florida. The Toledo Rockets of the Mid-American Conference defeated the Davidson Wildcats of the Southern Conference by a score of 56–33. The Tangerine Bowl is a former name of what is now called the Citrus Bowl.

Heading into the game, the University of Toledo finished their regular season slate with a first-ever perfect 10–0 record. The Rockets also held a #20 Associated Press (AP) national ranking—their first appearance in a national poll. The 1969 Toledo Rockets football team was led by All-American defensive tackle Mel Long and quarterback Chuck Ealey.

Davidson College, meanwhile, qualified as Southern Conference champions for the first time ever. They finished their regular season with a 7–4 record. The 1969 Tangerine Bowl is still Davidson's only postseason bowl appearance.

In the game, the Rockets accumulated 324 yards of total offense and scored 42 points in the first half alone. Quarterback Chuck Ealey was voted the game's most valuable back, while his teammate Dan Crockett was voted most valuable lineman. Ealey ran nine times for 83 yards and threw for 147 yards and three touchdowns on 10-of-13 passing. Don Fair caught four passed for 78 yards while Charles Cole ran 22 times for 152 yards. Toledo finished the season with a #20 national ranking in the final AP Poll.
