= Vince Carillot =

American football coach (1927–2020)

Biographical details
- Born: March 25, 1927; New York City, New York, U.S.
- Died: December 24, 2020 (aged 93); Savannah, Georgia, U.S.

Coaching career (HC unless noted)
- 1954–1959: East Lansing HS (MI)
- 1960–1968: Michigan State (assistant)
- 1969: Tulsa

Head coaching record
- Overall: 1–9 (college); 44–4 (high school)

Vincent Jean Carillot (March 25, 1927 – December 24, 2020) was an American football coach. He attended Michigan State University in 1947, received both bachelor's and master's degrees there, and was an assistant football coach, handling the defensive backfield, for eight years. He was the head football coach for the Tulsa Golden Hurricane football team during the 1969 season. In 1970, Carillot resigned during an NCAA probe into alleged recruiting violations at Tulsa.

== Head coaching record ==
=== College ===
Year	Team	Overall	Conference	Standing	Bowl/playoffs
Tulsa Golden Hurricane (Missouri Valley Conference) (1969)
1969	Tulsa	1–9	1–4	T–5th	
Tulsa:		1–9	1–4		
Total:		1–9			
