= 1969 NC State Wolfpack football team =

American college football season

1969 NC State Wolfpack football
- Conference: Atlantic Coast Conference
- Record: 3–6–1 (3–2–1 ACC)
- Head coach: Earle Edwards (16th season)
- Home stadium: Carter Stadium

1969 Atlantic Coast Conference football standings
	Conf.					Overall
Team	W		L		T	W		L		T
South Carolina $	6	–	0	–	0	7	–	4	–	0
NC State	3	–	2	–	1	3	–	6	–	1
North Carolina	3	–	3	–	0	5	–	5	–	0
Clemson	3	–	3	–	0	4	–	6	–	0
Duke	3	–	3	–	1	3	–	6	–	1
Maryland	3	–	3	–	0	3	–	7	–	0
Wake Forest	2	–	5	–	0	3	–	7	–	0
Virginia	1	–	5	–	0	3	–	7	–	0
$ – Conference champion; Rankings from AP Poll

The 1969 NC State Wolfpack football team represented North Carolina State University during the 1969 NCAA University Division football season. The Wolfpack were led by 16th-year head coach Earle Edwards and played their home games at Carter Stadium in Raleigh, North Carolina. They competed as members of the Atlantic Coast Conference, finishing in second.

== Schedule ==
Date	Opponent	Site	Result	Attendance	Source
September 13	Wake Forest	Carter Stadium; Raleigh, NC (rivalry)	L 21–22	36,900	
September 20	North Carolina	Carter Stadium; Raleigh, NC (rivalry)	W 10–3	32,000	
September 27	at Maryland	Byrd Stadium; College Park, MD	W 24–7	28,400	
October 3	at Miami (FL)*	Miami Orange Bowl; Miami, FL	L 13–23	37,038	
October 11	at South Carolina	Carolina Stadium; Columbia, SC	L 16–21	42,786	
October 18	at Virginia	Scott Stadium; Charlottesville, VA	W 31–0	26,000	
October 25	Duke	Carter Stadium; Raleigh, NC (rivalry)	T 25–25	32,700	
November 15	No. T–18 Houston*	Carter Stadium; Raleigh, NC	L 13–34	31,000	
November 22	at Florida State*	Doak Campbell Stadium; Tallahassee, FL	L 22–33	25,343	
November 29	No. 3 Penn State*	Carter Stadium; Raleigh, NC	L 8–33	24,150	
*Non-conference game; Rankings from AP Poll released prior to the game
