= 1969 Western Michigan Broncos football team =

American college football season

1969 Western Michigan Broncos football
- Conference: Mid-American Conference
- Record: 4–6 (1–4 MAC)
- Head coach: Bill Doolittle (6th season)
- MVP: Mike Siwek
- Captains: Mike Siwek; Paul Minnis
- Home stadium: Waldo Stadium

1969 Mid-American Conference football standings
	Conf.					Overall
Team	W		L		T	W		L		T
Toledo $	5	–	0	–	0	11	–	0	–	0
Bowling Green	4	–	1	–	0	6	–	4	–	0
Miami (OH)	2	–	3	–	0	7	–	3	–	0
Ohio	2	–	3	–	0	5	–	4	–	1
Kent State	1	–	4	–	0	5	–	5	–	0
Western Michigan	1	–	4	–	0	4	–	6	–	0
$ – Conference champion

The 1969 Western Michigan Broncos football team represented Western Michigan University in the Mid-American Conference (MAC) during the 1969 NCAA University Division football season. In their sixth season under head coach Bill Doolittle, the Broncos compiled a 4–6 record (2–4 against MAC opponents), finished in a tie for fifth place in the MAC, and outscored their opponents, 216 to 203. The team played its home games at Waldo Stadium in Kalamazoo, Michigan.

The team's statistical leaders included Ted Grignon with 1,001 passing yards, Roger Lawson with 1,205 rushing yards, and Greg Flaska with 372 receiving yards. Defensive tackle Mike Siwek and tackle Paul Minnis were the team captains. Siwek also received the team's most outstanding player award.

== Schedule ==
Date	Time	Opponent	Site	Result	Attendance	Source
September 13	1:30 p.m.	Central Michigan*	Waldo Stadium; Kalamazoo, MI (rivalry)	W 24–0	19,100	
September 20	11:00 p.m.	at Pacific (CA)*	Pacific Memorial Stadium; Stockton, CA	L 0–21	9,200	
September 27	1:30 p.m.	Miami (OH)	Waldo Stadium; Kalamazoo, MI	L 20–24	18,500	
October 4		at Bowling Green	Doyt Perry Stadium; Bowling Green, OH	L 10–21	11,623	
October 11	1:30 p.m.	Kent State	Waldo Stadium; Kalamazoo, MI	W 33–13	10,900	
October 18		at Toledo	Glass Bowl; Toledo, OH	L 13–38	16,823	
October 25	1:30 p.m.	Marshall*	Waldo Stadium; Kalamazoo, MI	W 48–14	22,200	
November 1	1:30 p.m.	at Ohio	Peden Stadium; Athens, OH	L 17–22	16,063	
November 8	1:30 p.m.	West Texas State*	Waldo Stadium; Kalamazoo, MI	L 20–28	15,500	
November 15	2:30 p.m.	at Northern Illinois*	Huskie Stadium; DeKalb, IL	W 31–22	9,900	
*Non-conference game; All times are in Eastern time
