= 1969 William & Mary Indians football team =

American college football season

1969 William & Mary Indians football
- Conference: Southern Conference
- Record: 3–7 (2–2 SoCon)
- Head coach: Lou Holtz (1st season)
- Captains: Dave Holland; Jim Cavanaugh
- Home stadium: Cary Field

1969 Southern Conference football standings
	Conf.					Overall
Team	W		L		T	W		L		T
Davidson +	5	–	1	–	0	7	–	4	–	0
Richmond +	5	–	1	–	0	6	–	4	–	0
The Citadel	4	–	2	–	0	7	–	3	–	0
William & Mary	2	–	2	–	0	3	–	7	–	0
East Carolina	1	–	3	–	0	2	–	7	–	0
Furman	0	–	4	–	0	1	–	8	–	1
VMI	0	–	4	–	0	0	–	10	–	0
+ – Conference co-champions

The 1969 William & Mary Indians football team was an American football team that represented the College of William & Mary as a member of the Southern Conference (SoCon) during the 1969 NCAA University Division football season. In their first season under head coach Lou Holtz, William & Mary compiled a 3–7 record, with a mark of 2–2 in conference play, placing fourth in the SoCon.

== Schedule ==
Date	Time	Opponent	Site	Result	Attendance	Source
September 20	8:00 p.m.	at Cincinnati*	Nippert Stadium; Cincinnati, OH	L 18–26	7,099	
September 27		at Temple*	Temple Stadium; Philadelphia, PA	W 7–6	12,000	
October 4		Virginia*	Cary Field; Williamsburg, VA	L 15–28	12,500	
October 11		at The Citadel	Johnson Hagood Stadium; Charleston, SC	W 21–14	21,460	
October 18		Davidson	Cary Field; Williamsburg, VA	L 15–17	11,500	
October 25		VMI	Cary Field; Williamsburg, VA (rivalry)	W 25–17	8,000	
November 1		vs. Virginia Tech*	Victory Stadium; Roanoke, VA (Harvest Bowl)	L 7–48	6,000	
November 8		West Virginia*	Cary Field; Williamsburg, VA	L 0–31	7,000	
November 15	1:30 p.m.	at Villanova*	Villanova Stadium; Villanova, PA	L 21–35	7,320	
November 22		Richmond	Cary Field; Williamsburg, VA (rivalry)	L 17–28	9,000	
*Non-conference game; All times are in Eastern time
