= 1969 South Carolina Gamecocks football team =

American college football season

1969 South Carolina Gamecocks football

ACC champion

Peach Bowl, L 3–14 vs. West Virginia
- Conference: Atlantic Coast Conference
- Record: 7–4 (6–0 ACC)
- Head coach: Paul Dietzel (4th season)
- Captains: Don Buckner; Pat Watson
- Home stadium: Carolina Stadium

1969 Atlantic Coast Conference football standings
	Conf.					Overall
Team	W		L		T	W		L		T
South Carolina $	6	–	0	–	0	7	–	4	–	0
NC State	3	–	2	–	1	3	–	6	–	1
North Carolina	3	–	3	–	0	5	–	5	–	0
Clemson	3	–	3	–	0	4	–	6	–	0
Duke	3	–	3	–	1	3	–	6	–	1
Maryland	3	–	3	–	0	3	–	7	–	0
Wake Forest	2	–	5	–	0	3	–	7	–	0
Virginia	1	–	5	–	0	3	–	7	–	0
$ – Conference champion; Rankings from AP Poll

The 1969 South Carolina Gamecocks football team represented the University of South Carolina as a member of the Atlantic Coast Conference (ACC) during the 1969 NCAA University Division football season. Led by fourth-year head coach Paul Dietzel, the Gamecocks compiled an overall record of 7–4 with a mark of 6–0 in conference play, winning the ACC title. It was also South Carolina's first winning season since 1959. South Carolina was invited to the Peach Bowl, where they were defeated by West Virginia. The team played home games at Carolina Stadium in Columbia, South Carolina.

== Schedule ==
Date	Opponent	Site	Result	Attendance	Source
September 20	Duke	Carolina Stadium; Columbia, SC	W 27–20	42,791	
September 27	North Carolina	Carolina Stadium; Columbia, SC (rivalry)	W 14–6	42,559	
October 4	at No. 7 Georgia*	Sanford Stadium; Athens, GA (rivalry)	L 16–41	59,452	
October 11	NC State	Carolina Stadium; Columbia, SC	W 21–16	42,786	
October 18	at Virginia Tech*	Lane Stadium; Blacksburg, VA	W 17–16	28,000	
October 25	Maryland	Carolina Stadium; Columbia, SC	W 17–0	42,756	
November 1	at Florida State*	Doak Campbell Stadium; Tallahassee, FL	L 9–34	34,519	
November 8	at No. 3 Tennessee*	Neyland Stadium; Knoxville, TN (rivalry)	L 14–29	62,868	
November 15	at Wake Forest	Groves Stadium; Winston-Salem, NC	W 24–6	25,000	
November 22	Clemson	Carolina Stadium; Columbia, SC (rivalry)	W 27–13	42,921	
December 30	vs. No. 19 West Virginia*	Grant Field; Atlanta, GA (Peach Bowl)	L 3–14	48,452	
*Non-conference game; Rankings from AP Poll released prior to the game

== Game summaries ==
=== Duke ===
	1	2	3	4	Total
Duke	3	0	7	10	20
South Carolina	0	10	0	17	27

==== Pre game ====
On Saturday September 20, 1969, South Carolina hosted Duke to open the 100th college football season. Coming into the game, The Gamecocks were two and a half touchdown favorites according to odds makers, both teams being favorites to win the ACC in pre season speculation. An area of concern for the Gamecocks however was the unproven offensive line.

==== 1st half ====
A Tommy Suggs fumble at the USC 33 recovered by Mike Fitzpatrick, set up the game's first score with a Pugh 24-yard field goal giving Duke a 3–0 lead. The Gamecocks had a 10–3 lead at the half thanks to a Rudy Holloman 60 yard rushing touchdown, and a 30-yard field goal from Billy DuPre. The SC defense held Duke star QB Leo Hart to just five completions in 12 attempts for 28 yards. Just after the start of the 2nd quarter, USC's Holloman scored on a 60-yard run, giving the Gamecocks a 10–3 lead that they would take into the break.

==== 2nd half ====
Duke QB Hart's bounced back in the 2nd half passing led them to a 51-yard touchdown drive capped by a three-yard pass to Marcell Courtillet to tie the game 10–10 with 8:32 remaining in the 3rd quarter. DuPre 37-yard field goal in the 4th quarter gave SC the lead back 13–10, but Duke's QB Hart responded with 79 yard, 8 play drive, capped off by an 18-yard touchdown pass to Wes Chesson. With just under 11 minutes to play, Dietzel gambled on 4th and two, Gamecock QB Tommy Suggs faked a handoff and ran a 48-yard touchdown, darting through the right tackle without a single Duke player touching him giving SC a 20–17 lead. Duke's kicker Pugh would tie it at 20–20 with a 43-yard field goal.

==== Final drive ====
With only one minute and twenty five seconds left, the Gamecocks completed a 12 play scoring drive, beginning at their own 25 yard line. Muir opened the drive with a 10-yard run, Muir then caught a Suggs pass for 16 more yards. Later in the drive, Fred Zeigler caught his 100th pass in his career, a 24-yard pass from Suggs. On first down from the 2, Muir ran it in giving the Gamecocks the 27–20 lead and sending the sold out crowd of 42,791 into a frenzy.

==== Post game ====
Holloman finished with 125 yards rushing, QB Suggs had 105 rushing yards, and went 10-16 passing for 107 yards.

Dietzel post game said "That fourth down play at midfield with better than 10 minutes to go in the game was the biggest gamble that I've ever taken" also adding "Possibly the most amazing thing about our defense was that we played almost the whole game with Pat Watson and three true sophomores in the Secondary. It's most unusual for a major college team to play a game with three true sophomores in the secondary. You can get beat quicker there than anywhere else."
