= 1969 Clemson Tigers football team =

American college football season

1969 Clemson Tigers football
- Conference: Atlantic Coast Conference
- Record: 4–6 (3–3 ACC)
- Head coach: Frank Howard (30th season)
- Captains: Ivan Southerland; Charlie Tolley
- Home stadium: Memorial Stadium

1969 Atlantic Coast Conference football standings
	Conf.					Overall
Team	W		L		T	W		L		T
South Carolina $	6	–	0	–	0	7	–	4	–	0
NC State	3	–	2	–	1	3	–	6	–	1
North Carolina	3	–	3	–	0	5	–	5	–	0
Clemson	3	–	3	–	0	4	–	6	–	0
Duke	3	–	3	–	1	3	–	6	–	1
Maryland	3	–	3	–	0	3	–	7	–	0
Wake Forest	2	–	5	–	0	3	–	7	–	0
Virginia	1	–	5	–	0	3	–	7	–	0
$ – Conference champion; Rankings from AP Poll

The 1969 Clemson Tigers football team was an American football team that represented Clemson University in the Atlantic Coast Conference (ACC) during the 1969 NCAA University Division football season. In its 30th and final season under head coach Frank Howard, the team compiled a 4–6 record (3–3 against conference opponents), tied for third place in the ACC, and was outscored by a total of 250 to 178. The team played its home games at Memorial Stadium in Clemson, South Carolina.

Frank Howard retired as head coach after the 1969 season, although he remained athletic director until 1971. In 1974, the playing field at Memorial Stadium, which he helped to build, was named in his honor.

Defensive end Ivan Southerland and running back Charlie Tolley were the team captains. The team's statistical leaders included quarterback Tommy Kendrick with 1,457 passing yards, running back Ray Yauger with 968 rushing yards and 66 points (11 touchdowns), and end Charlie Waters with 738 receiving yards.

Three Clemson players were selected by the Associated Press as first-team players on the 1969 All-Atlantic Coast Conference football team: Ray Yauger; Charlie Waters; and Ivan Southerland.

== Schedule ==
Date	Time	Opponent	Site	Result	Attendance	Source
September 20	1:30 p.m.	at Virginia	Scott Stadium; Charlottesville, VA	W 21–14	18,000	
September 27	1:30 p.m.	No. 7 Georgia*	Memorial Stadium; Clemson, SC (rivalry)	L 0–30	43,035	
October 4	2:00 p.m.	at Georgia Tech*	Grant Field; Atlanta, GA (rivalry)	W 21–10	50,224	
October 11	1:30 p.m.	at No. 20 Auburn*	Cliff Hare Stadium; Auburn, AL (rivalry)	L 0–51	38,000	
October 18	1:30 p.m.	Wake Forest^{†}	Memorial Stadium; Clemson, SC	W 28–14	29,031	
October 25	1:30 p.m.	Alabama*	Memorial Stadium; Clemson, SC (rivalry)	L 13–38	41,384	
November 1	1:30 p.m.	Maryland	Memorial Stadium; Clemson, SC	W 40–0	20,000	
November 8	2:00 p.m.	at Duke	Wallace Wade Stadium; Durham, NC	L 27–34	22,000	
November 15	1:30 p.m.	at North Carolina	Kenan Memorial Stadium; Chapel Hill, NC	L 15–32	32,500	
November 22	1:30 p.m.	at South Carolina	Carolina Stadium; Columbia, SC (rivalry)	L 13–27	42,921	
*Non-conference game; ^{†}Homecoming; Rankings from AP Poll released prior to the game; All times are in Eastern time
