= 1969 VMI Keydets football team =

American college football season

1969 VMI Keydets football
- Conference: Southern Conference
- Record: 0–10 (0–4 SoCon)
- Head coach: Vito Ragazzo (4th season)
- Home stadium: Alumni Memorial Field

1969 Southern Conference football standings
| | Conf. | | | | | Overall |
| Team | W | | L | | T | W | | L | | T |
|---|---|---|---|---|---|---|---|---|---|---|
| Davidson + | 5 | – | 1 | – | 0 | 7 | – | 4 | – | 0 |
| Richmond + | 5 | – | 1 | – | 0 | 6 | – | 4 | – | 0 |
| The Citadel | 4 | – | 2 | – | 0 | 7 | – | 3 | – | 0 |
| William & Mary | 2 | – | 2 | – | 0 | 3 | – | 7 | – | 0 |
| East Carolina | 1 | – | 3 | – | 0 | 2 | – | 7 | – | 0 |
| Furman | 0 | – | 4 | – | 0 | 1 | – | 8 | – | 1 |
| VMI | 0 | – | 4 | – | 0 | 0 | – | 10 | – | 0 |
+ – Conference co-champions

The 1969 VMI Keydets football team was an American football team that represented the Virginia Military Institute (VMI) as a member of the Southern Conference (SoCon) during the 1969 NCAA University Division football season. In their fourth year under head coach Vito Ragazzo, the team compiled an overall record of 0–10 with a mark of 0–4 in conference play, placing last in the SoCon.

== Schedule ==
| Date | Opponent | Site | Result | Attendance | Source |
|---|---|---|---|---|---|
| September 20 | at Rice* | Rice Stadium; Houston, TX | L 0–55 | 18,000 | |
| September 27 | Richmond | Alumni Memorial Field; Lexington, VA (rivalry) | L 0–20 | 8,000 | |
| October 4 | at No. 18 West Virginia* | Mountaineer Field; Morgantown, WV | L 0–32 | 28,500 | |
| October 11 | vs. Virginia* | City Stadium; Richmond, VA (Tobacco Bowl) | L 10–28 | 18,000 | |
| October 18 | The Citadel | Alumni Memorial Field; Lexington, VA (rivalry) | L 2–28 | 6,500 | |
| October 25 | at William & Mary | Cary Field; Williamsburg, VA (rivalry) | L 17–25 | 8,000 | |
| November 1 | at Davidson | Richardson Stadium; Davidson, NC | L 6–59 | 6,900 | |
| November 8 | at North Carolina* | Kenan Memorial Stadium; Chapel Hill, NC | L 11–61 | 29,500 | |
| November 15 | at Boston College* | Alumni Stadium; Chestnut Hill, MA | L 32–49 | 11,400 | |
| November 27 | vs. Virginia Tech* | Victory Stadium; Roanoke, VA (rivalry) | L 0–52 | 14,000 | |
*Non-conference game; Rankings from AP Poll released prior to the game
