= 1969 The Citadel Bulldogs football team =

American college football season

1969 The Citadel Bulldogs football
- Conference: Southern Conference
- Record: 7–3 (4–2 SoCon)
- Head coach: Red Parker (4th season)
- Home stadium: Johnson Hagood Stadium

1969 Southern Conference football standings
| | Conf. | | | | | Overall |
| Team | W | | L | | T | W | | L | | T |
|---|---|---|---|---|---|---|---|---|---|---|
| Davidson + | 5 | – | 1 | – | 0 | 7 | – | 4 | – | 0 |
| Richmond + | 5 | – | 1 | – | 0 | 6 | – | 4 | – | 0 |
| The Citadel | 4 | – | 2 | – | 0 | 7 | – | 3 | – | 0 |
| William & Mary | 2 | – | 2 | – | 0 | 3 | – | 7 | – | 0 |
| East Carolina | 1 | – | 3 | – | 0 | 2 | – | 7 | – | 0 |
| Furman | 0 | – | 4 | – | 0 | 1 | – | 8 | – | 1 |
| VMI | 0 | – | 4 | – | 0 | 0 | – | 10 | – | 0 |
+ – Conference co-champions

The 1969 The Citadel Bulldogs football team represented The Citadel, The Military College of South Carolina in the 1969 NCAA University Division football season. Red Parker served as head coach for the fourth season. The Bulldogs played as members of the Southern Conference and played home games at Johnson Hagood Stadium.

== Schedule ==
| Date | Opponent | Site | Result | Attendance | Source |
|---|---|---|---|---|---|
| September 20 | at Lehigh* | Taylor Stadium; Bethlehem, PA | W 41–16 | 10,000 | |
| September 27 | Arkansas State* | Johnson Hagood Stadium; Charleston, SC | W 14–10 | 19,276 | |
| October 4 | at East Carolina | Dowdy–Ficklen Stadium; Greenville, NC | W 31–13 | 11,500 | |
| October 11 | William & Mary | Johnson Hagood Stadium; Charleston, SC | L 14–21 | 21,460 | |
| October 18 | at VMI | Alumni Memorial Field; Lexington, VA (rivalry) | W 28–2 | 6,500 | |
| October 25 | Davidson | Johnson Hagood Stadium; Charleston, SC | W 34–28 | 21,573 | |
| November 1 | at Richmond | City Stadium; Richmond, VA | L 18–45 | 12,000 | |
| November 8 | Maine* | Johnson Hagood Stadium; Charleston, SC | W 40–28 | 15,000 | |
| November 15 | Furman^{†} | Johnson Hagood Stadium; Charleston, SC (rivalry) | W 37–21 | 17,350 | |
| November 21 | Chattanooga* | Johnson Hagood Stadium; Charleston, SC | L 5–10 | 8,450 | |
*Non-conference game; ^{†}Homecoming

== NFL draft selection ==
| Year | Round | Pick | Overall | Name | Team | Position |
|---|---|---|---|---|---|---|
| 1969 | 16 | 25 | 415 | Jim McMillan | Baltimore Colts | Running Back |
