= 1969 East Carolina Pirates football team =

American college football season

1969 East Carolina Pirates football
- Conference: Southern Conference
- Record: 2–7 (1–3 SoCon)
- Head coach: Clarence Stasavich (8th season)
- Home stadium: Ficklen Memorial Stadium

1969 Southern Conference football standings
	Conf.					Overall
Team	W		L		T	W		L		T
Davidson +	5	–	1	–	0	7	–	4	–	0
Richmond +	5	–	1	–	0	6	–	4	–	0
The Citadel	4	–	2	–	0	7	–	3	–	0
William & Mary	2	–	2	–	0	3	–	7	–	0
East Carolina	1	–	3	–	0	2	–	7	–	0
Furman	0	–	4	–	0	1	–	8	–	1
VMI	0	–	4	–	0	0	–	10	–	0
+ – Conference co-champions

The 1969 East Carolina Pirates football team was an American football team that represented East Carolina University as a member of the Southern Conference during the 1969 NCAA University Division football season. In their eighth season under head coach Clarence Stasavich, the team compiled a 2–7 record.

== Schedule ==
Date	Opponent	Site	Result	Attendance	Source
September 20	at East Tennessee State*	University Stadium; Johnson City, TN	L 0–7	5,500	
September 27	Louisiana Tech*	Ficklen Memorial Stadium; Greenville, NC	L 6–24	13,500	
October 4	The Citadel	Ficklen Memorial Stadium; Greenville, NC	L 13–31	11,500	
October 18	at Richmond	City Stadium; Richmond, VA	L 7–24	6,500	
October 25	at Southern Illinois*	McAndrew Stadium; Carbondale, IL	W 17–3	12,500	
November 1	Furman	Ficklen Memorial Stadium; Greenville, NC	W 24–21	2,000	
November 8	Davidson	Ficklen Memorial Stadium; Greenville, NC	L 27–42	15,337	
November 15	at Marshall*	Fairfield Stadium; Huntington, WV (rivalry)	L 7–38	5,500	
November 22	Southern Miss*	Ficklen Memorial Stadium; Greenville, NC	L 7–14	3,500	
*Non-conference game
