= 1969 Ohio Bobcats football team =

American college football season

1969 Ohio Bobcats football
- Conference: Mid-American Conference
- Record: 5–4–1 (2–3 MAC)
- Head coach: Bill Hess (12th season)
- Home stadium: Peden Stadium

1969 Mid-American Conference football standings
	Conf.					Overall
Team	W		L		T	W		L		T
Toledo $	5	–	0	–	0	11	–	0	–	0
Bowling Green	4	–	1	–	0	6	–	4	–	0
Miami (OH)	2	–	3	–	0	7	–	3	–	0
Ohio	2	–	3	–	0	5	–	4	–	1
Kent State	1	–	4	–	0	5	–	5	–	0
Western Michigan	1	–	4	–	0	4	–	6	–	0
$ – Conference champion

The 1969 Ohio Bobcats football team was an American football team that represented Ohio University in the Mid-American Conference (MAC) during the 1969 NCAA University Division football season. In their 12th season under head coach Bill Hess, the Bobcats compiled a 5–4–1 record (2–3 against MAC opponents), finished in a tie for third place, and outscored all opponents by a combined total of 256 to 222. They played their home games in Peden Stadium in Athens, Ohio.

== Schedule ==
Date	Time	Opponent	Site	Result	Attendance	Source
September 20	1:50 p.m.	Kent State	Peden Stadium; Athens, OH	W 35–0	17,062	
September 27	2:30 p.m.	at Minnesota*	Memorial Stadium; Minneapolis, MN	T 35–35	41,235	
October 4	8:00 p.m.	at Toledo	Glass Bowl; Toledo, OH	L 9–34	19,223	
October 11	1:30 p.m.	Xavier*	Peden Stadium; Athens, OH	W 31–6	19,278	
October 18		at Miami (OH)	Miami Field; Oxford, OH (rivalry)	L 21–24	17,399	
October 25	1:30 p.m.	at No. 8 Penn State*	Beaver Stadium; University Park, PA	L 3–42	49,419	
November 1	1:30 p.m.	Western Michigan	Peden Stadium; Athens, OH	W 22–17	16,063	
November 8		Bowling Green	Peden Stadium; Athens, OH	L 16–23	16,203	
November 15		Cincinnati*	Peden Stadium; Athens, OH	W 46–6	5,823	
November 22		at Marshall*	Fairfield Stadium; Huntington, WV (rivalry)	W 38–35	8,200	
*Non-conference game; Rankings from AP Poll released prior to the game; All times are in Eastern time
