= Guy Roberts (linebacker) =

American football player (born 1950)

No. 56, 59
- Position: Linebacker

Personal information
- Born: June 12, 1950 (age 76); North Babylon, New York, U.S.
- Listed height: 6 ft 1 in (1.85 m)
- Listed weight: 217 lb (98 kg)

Career information
- High school: North Babylon
- College: Maryland
- NFL draft: 1972: 8th round, 187th overall pick

Career history
- Houston Oilers (1972–1975); Atlanta Falcons (1976); Miami Dolphins (1977)

Awards and highlights
- First-team All-ACC (1970)
- Stats at Pro Football Reference

Guy Michael Roberts (born June 12, 1950) is an American former professional football linebacker who played in the National Football League (NFL) with the Houston Oilers, Atlanta Falcons, and Miami Dolphins. He played college football for the Maryland Terrapins and was selected by the Oilers in the eighth round of the 1972 NFL draft.

== Early life ==
Guy Michael Roberts was born on June 12, 1950, in North Babylon, New York. He attended North Babylon High School.

== College career ==
Roberts enrolled at the University of Maryland, College Park to play college football for the Terrapins. He was on the freshman team in 1968. He was a three-year letterman and starter from 1969 to 1971. He was named was named first-team All-Atlantic Coast Conference by the Associated Press for the 1970 season. Roberts was a defensive end from 1969 to 1970 and a linebacker in 1971. He was also a team captain in 1971. He was benched by head coach Roy Lester for the game against Clemson on November 13, 1971, for criticizing teammates in the media.

== Professional career ==
Roberts was selected by the Houston Oilers in the eighth round, with the 187th overall pick, of the 1972 NFL draft. He played in 49 games, starting 15, for the Oilers from 1972 to 1975, recording four interceptions for 55 yards and four fumble recoveries.

On September 6, 1976, Roberts was traded to the Atlanta Falcons for Dennis Havig. Roberts appeared in all 14 games, starting three, for the Falcons during the 1976 season and intercepted one pass for seven yards. He was released on August 11, 1977.

Roberts signed with the Miami Dolphins on November 8, 1977. He played in four games for the Dolphins in 1977, and was later released on July 24, 1978.
