= 1969 Kent State Golden Flashes football team =

American college football season

1969 Kent State Golden Flashes football
- Conference: Mid-American Conference
- Record: 5–5 (1–4 MAC)
- Head coach: Dave Puddington (2nd season)
- Home stadium: Memorial Stadium

1969 Mid-American Conference football standings
	Conf.					Overall
Team	W		L		T	W		L		T
Toledo $	5	–	0	–	0	11	–	0	–	0
Bowling Green	4	–	1	–	0	6	–	4	–	0
Miami (OH)	2	–	3	–	0	7	–	3	–	0
Ohio	2	–	3	–	0	5	–	4	–	1
Kent State	1	–	4	–	0	5	–	5	–	0
Western Michigan	1	–	4	–	0	4	–	6	–	0
$ – Conference champion

The 1969 Kent State Golden Flashes football team was an American football team that represented Kent State University in the Mid-American Conference (MAC) during the 1969 NCAA University Division football season. In their second season under head coach Dave Puddington, the Golden Flashes compiled a 5–5 record (1–4 against MAC opponents), finished in sixth place in the MAC, and were outscored by all opponents by a combined total of 198 to 166. The 1969 season also marked the team's first year in the new Memorial Stadium, later named Dix Stadium. The stadium opened September 13 with a win over the Dayton Flyers, though was not fully completed until 1970.

The team's statistical leaders included Don Nottingham with 990 rushing yards, Steve Trustdorf with 442 passing yards, and Bob Fello with 222 receiving yards. Three Kent State players were selected as first-team All-MAC players: center Fred Blosser, linebacker Jim Corrigall, and running back Don Nottingham.

== Schedule ==
Date	Time	Opponent	Site	Result	Attendance	Source
September 13	1:30 p.m.	Dayton*	Memorial Stadium; Kent, OH	W 24–14	8,172	
September 20	1:50 p.m.	at Ohio	Peden Stadium; Athens, OH	L 0–35	17,062	
September 27	8:00 p.m.	at Xavier*	Corcoran Stadium; Cincinnati, OH	W 23–7	8,881	
October 4		at Buffalo*	Rotary Field; Buffalo, NY	W 17–8	8,368	
October 11	1:30 p.m.	at Western Michigan	Waldo Stadium; Kalamazoo, MI	L 13–33	10,900	
October 18		Bowling Green	Memorial Stadium; Kent, OH (rivalry)	L 0–7	17,628	
October 25		at Toledo	Glass Bowl; Toledo, OH	L 17–43	14,931	
November 1		Louisville*	Memorial Stadium; Kent, OH	W 35–6	2,000	
November 8		Marshall*	Memorial Stadium; Kent, OH	L 20–31	4,244	
November 15		Miami (OH)	Memorial Stadium; Kent, OH	W 17–14	> 1,000	
*Non-conference game; All times are in Eastern time
