= Lee Corso =

American college football coach and analyst (born 1935)

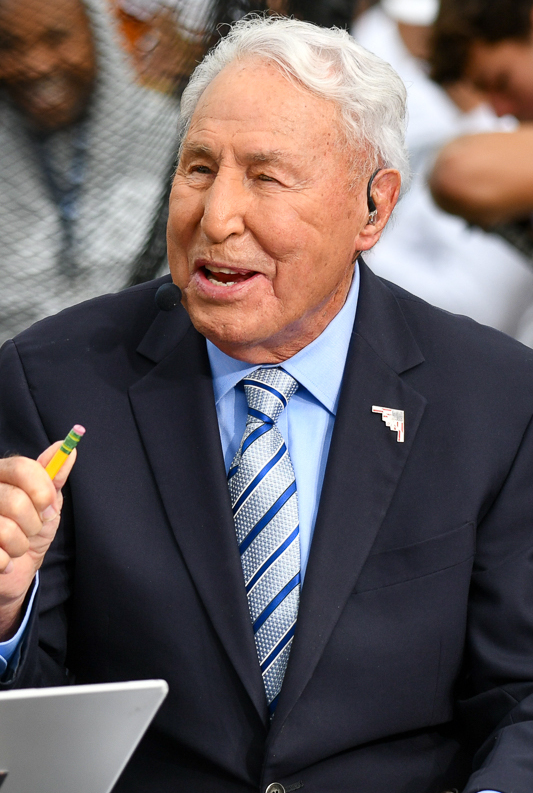
- Corso in 2024

Biographical details
- Born: August 7, 1935 (age 91); Cicero, Illinois, U.S.

Playing career
- 1953–1957: Florida State
- Positions: Quarterback, cornerback

Coaching career (HC unless noted)
- 1958: Florida State (GA)
- 1959–1965: Maryland (QB)
- 1966–1968: Navy (DB)
- 1969–1972: Louisville
- 1973–1982: Indiana
- 1984: Northern Illinois
- 1985: Orlando Renegades

Head coaching record
- Overall: 73–85–6 (college); 5–13 (USFL)
- Bowls: 1–0–1

Accomplishments and honors

Championships
- 2 MVC (1970, 1972)

Lee Richard Corso (born August 7, 1935) is an American former college football coach and analyst. He is best known for appearing on ESPN's College GameDay program from its inception in 1987 until his retirement in August 2025.

Corso served as the head football coach at the University of Louisville from 1969 to 1972, at Indiana University from 1973 to 1982, and at Northern Illinois University in 1984, compiling a career college football coaching record of 73–85–6. He was the head coach for the Orlando Renegades of the United States Football League in 1985, earning a record of 5–13.

== Early life and playing career ==
Lee Richard Corso was born in Cicero, Illinois, on August 7, 1935. His parents, Alessandro and Irma, were Italian immigrants. His father fled Italy during World War I at age 15. Alessandro, who had a second-grade education, was a lifelong laborer who laid terrazzo flooring, and Irma, who had a fifth-grade education, worked in school cafeterias and boarding schools.

At age 10, Corso moved with his family to Miami and later attended Miami Jackson High School, where he played quarterback. A baseball prospect, he was offered a $5,000 bonus to sign with the Brooklyn Dodgers as a shortstop. He chose college, though, playing football and baseball at Florida State University (FSU), where he was a roommate of football player and actor Burt Reynolds and future University of Miami baseball coach Ron Fraser. While at FSU, Corso earned the nickname "Sunshine Scooter" for his speed on the football field. As a defensive player, he set the school record for most career interceptions (14), which stood for more than two decades until it was broken by Monk Bonasorte. Corso was also a member of the Alpha Tau Omega fraternity. He was the starting quarterback for the South in the 1956 Blue–Gray Game, though his squad lost to the Len Dawson–led North team, 14–0.

Corso graduated with a bachelor's degree in physical education in 1957 and a master's degree in administration and supervision in 1958.

== Coaching career ==
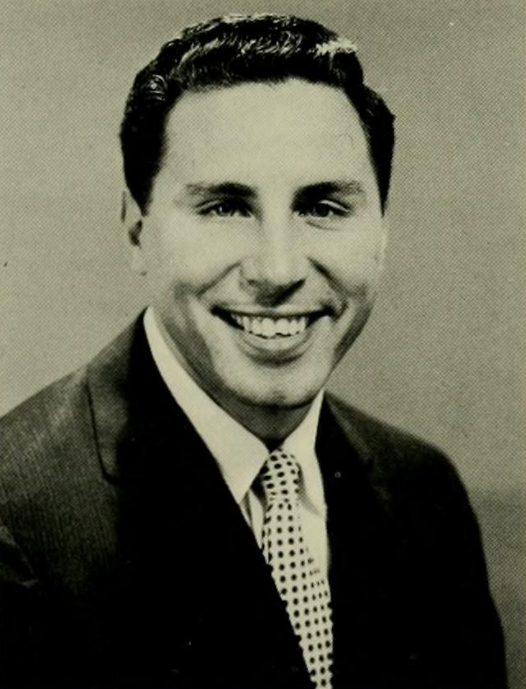
Corso, c. 1961

After college, Corso became the quarterbacks coach at Maryland under his former FSU coach, Tommy Nugent. In 1962, Corso followed Nugent's guidance to recruit an academically and athletically qualified black player and convinced Darryl Hill to transfer from the Naval Academy, making him the first African-American football player in the Atlantic Coast Conference.

In 1966, Corso became the defensive backs coach at Navy. In 1969, he was named head coach at Louisville, where he coached his ESPN colleague Tom Jackson. After taking Louisville to only its second-ever bowl game in 1970, he was hired by Indiana in 1972.

Corso coached at Indiana from 1973 to 1982, leading the Hoosiers to two winning seasons in 1979 and 1980. The 1979 regular season ended with 7–4 record and the team earned a trip to the 1979 Holiday Bowl. There, the Hoosiers beat the previously unbeaten BYU Cougars. Indiana's victory over the Cougars propelled the team to 16th in the UPI poll, the Hoosiers' first top-20 ranking since 1967. During one game in the 1976 season, Corso called a time out after his team scored a touchdown early in the second quarter. The entire team huddled together for a photograph with the scoreboard filling the background. It read: Indiana 7, Ohio State 6. It was the first time in 25 years that the Hoosiers had led the Buckeyes in a football game. Ohio State went on to win the game 47–7. Corso was fired after ten years with an overall record of 41–68–2 at Indiana.

Corso was the 16th head football coach at Northern Illinois University. In his lone season as Northern Illinois's head coach, Corso's record was 4–6–1.

After the stint at Northern Illinois, Corso made his professional football coaching debut for the Orlando Renegades of the United States Football League (USFL) in 1985. Corso was slated to return to the Renegades in fall 1986, but the league suspended operations before the season began.

== Broadcasting career ==
In 1987, Corso was hired by ESPN as an analyst for its Saturday College GameDay program that since 1993 had originated from the site of one of the day's big games. He often played the role of comic foil to co-hosts Chris Fowler and Kirk Herbstreit. Corso's catchphrase, "Not so fast, my friend!", with pencil always in hand, would commonly be exclaimed in playful disagreement to his colleagues' predictions.

Corso was also known for ending every weekly show with his headgear selection. For the final prediction of the show, usually covering the game taking place at the site of the show, Corso would put on the head of the mascot of the team he picked to win. His first headgear selection took place during the October 5, 1996, show in Columbus, Ohio, before an Ohio State–Penn State game, where Corso put on the head of Ohio State's Brutus Buckeye mascot to show his pick to win the game. Corso made his 250th headgear pick on November 1, 2014, putting on the head of TCU's Super Frog before their game against West Virginia in Morgantown, West Virginia. In his 400th headgear pick, taking place on September 16, 2023, Corso put on the head of Colorado's Chip the Buffalo before their game against Colorado State in Boulder, Colorado.

On April 17, 2025, Corso announced his retirement from broadcasting, with his final appearance on College GameDay taking place on August 30, 2025, in Columbus, Ohio, to cover the Week 1 game between Texas and Ohio State. Corso made his 431st and final headgear selection before the game, picking Ohio State, the team he picked for his first headgear selection in 1996, to defeat Texas. Ohio State defeated Texas, 14–7, and Corso ended his College GameDay tenure with a record of 287–144 (.666) all-time in headgear picks. Coincidentally, on the day of his retirement, all six of the teams Corso had coached won their respective games (Florida State, Maryland, Navy, Louisville, Indiana, and Northern Illinois). In addition, all six of Corso's picks from the picks segment of College GameDay were correct (Tennessee, South Carolina, Florida State, Miami, LSU, and Ohio State).

Corso made a brief cameo in a 2006 Nike commercial featuring the fictional Briscoe High School football team, portrayed by football icons such as Michael Vick, LaDainian Tomlinson, Brian Urlacher, Troy Polamalu, and fellow FSU alum Deion Sanders, and by coaches Don Shula, Jimmy Johnson, and Urban Meyer. Corso takes his hawk mascot head off while the game's deciding play unfolds in slow-motion.

Corso appeared annually in EA Sports' NCAA Football titles along with Herbstreit and play-by-play man Brad Nessler until NCAA Football 11. The 2006 to 2011 sixth-generation console editions of the games feature a preshow that includes Corso making his mascot headgear prediction. If the team Corso chooses does not have a mascot, he wears the helmet from the team picked, instead, like on College GameDay. During play selection, players can opt for "Ask Corso", replicating the "Ask Madden" feature in the Madden NFL series.

== Other work, charities, and personal life ==
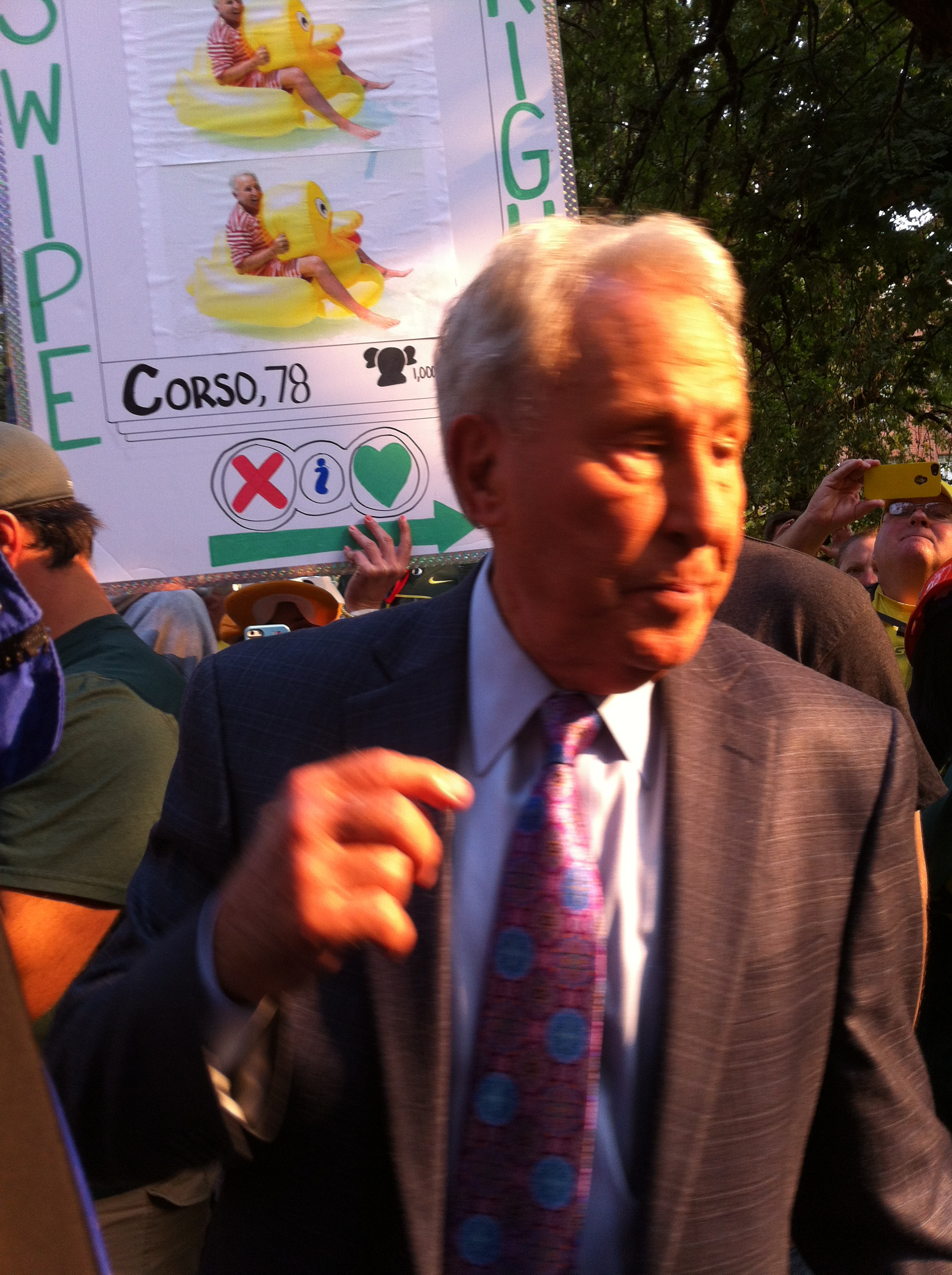
Corso in 2014

Corso formerly served as director of business development for Dixon Ticonderoga, a Florida-based manufacturer of writing and arts products known for its No. 2 pencils, one of which he regularly held on College GameDay. In 2001, Corso spearheaded an effort to create a crayon completely out of soybeans.

In 1991, Corso served as general manager of the World League of American Football's Orlando Thunder.

Corso serves as honorary chairman of Coaches Curing Kids' Cancer, a charity that raises money for pediatric cancer research through youth sports teams. Corso was honored with the National College Football Awards Association's Contributions to College Football Award "recognizing exceptional contributions to college football and a lifetime of achievement and integrity" during the Home Depot College Football Awards show at Walt Disney World on December 9, 2010. Growing up in Miami, Corso attended his local Boys' Club and is listed in the Boys & Girls Clubs of America Alumni Hall of Fame.

On May 16, 2009, Corso suffered a stroke at his Florida home, suffering partial paralysis. He spent three days in intensive care and a week in the hospital, followed by a lengthy rehabilitation. He was able to return to his ESPN College GameDay duties for the 2009 season. The stroke left him unable to speak for a month (his speech eventually recovered with few noticeable side effects) and severely slowed his cognitive function; after the stroke, Corso had to script and rehearse his appearances on College GameDay and was no longer able to effectively ad lib.

While at Florida State, Corso was roommates and teammates with actor Burt Reynolds. The two remained close friends until Reynolds's death in 2018.

In 2026, Corso was named Humanitarian of the Year by Bergenske Family Charities, a Florida-based nonprofit organization that awards educational scholarships in honor of distinguished individuals.

Corso has been married to his wife, Betsy, since 1957. They have four children and 10 grandchildren.

== Honors ==
- Inducted into the Florida State Athletics Hall of Fame (1978).
- Inducted into the Florida Sports Hall of Fame (2003).
- Inducted into the University of Louisville Athletics Hall of Fame (2004).
- Inducted into the Indiana University Athletics Hall of Fame (2010).
- Inducted into the Kentucky Sports Hall of Fame (2012).
- Inducted into the National Sports Media Association Hall of Fame (2023).
- Inducted into the Orange Bowl Hall of Fame (2025).
- Recipient of the National College Football Awards Association Contributions to College Football Award (2010).
- Recipient of the Amos Alonzo Stagg Award (2026).

== Head coaching record ==
=== College ===
Year	Team	Overall	Conference	Standing	Bowl/playoffs	Coaches^{#}	AP^{°}
Louisville Cardinals (Missouri Valley Conference) (1969–1972)
1969	Louisville	5–4–1	2–3	T–3rd			
1970	Louisville	8–3–1	4–0	1st	T Pasadena		
1971	Louisville	6–3–1	3–2	T–2nd			
1972	Louisville	9–1	4–1	T–1st		16	18
Louisville:		28–11–3	13–6				
Indiana Hoosiers (Big Ten Conference) (1973–1982)
1973	Indiana	2–9	0–8	T–9th			
1974	Indiana	1–10	1–7	10th			
1975	Indiana	2–8–1	1–6–1	10th			
1976	Indiana	5–6	4–4	T–3rd			
1977	Indiana	5–5–1	4–3–1	4th			
1978	Indiana	4–7	3–5	7th			
1979	Indiana	8–4	5–3	4th	W Holiday	16	19
1980	Indiana	6–5	3–5	T–6th			
1981	Indiana	3–8	3–6	9th			
1982	Indiana	5–6	4–5	6th			
Indiana:		41–68–2	27–53–2				
Northern Illinois Huskies (Mid-American Conference) (1984)
1984	Northern Illinois	4–6–1	3–5–1	5th			
Northern Illinois:		4–6–1	3–5–1				
Total:		73–85–6					
National championship Conference title Conference division title or championship game berth
^{#}Rankings from final Coaches Poll.; ^{°}Rankings from final AP Poll.

=== USFL ===
Team	Year	Regular Season					Postseason		
Team	Year	Won	Lost	Ties	Win %	Finish	Won	Lost	Win %
ORL	1985	5	13	0	.288	7th in Eastern Con.	0	0	.000
Total		5	13	0	.228				
