= Roy Lester =

American football player and coach (1923–2020)

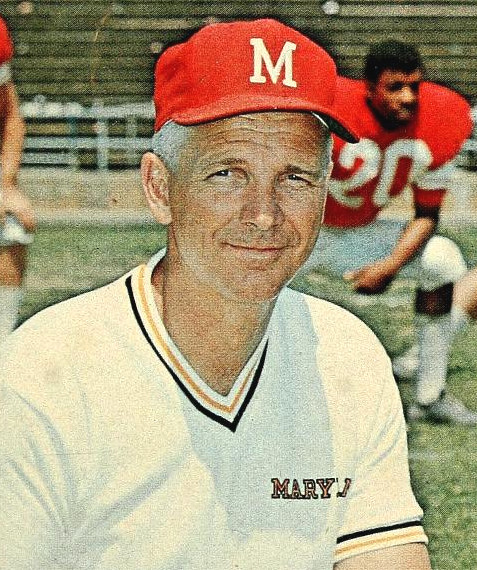
- Lester, circa 1969

Biographical details
- Born: October 3, 1923; Spencer, West Virginia, U.S.
- Died: May 3, 2020 (aged 96); Rockville, Maryland, U.S.

Playing career
- 1946–1949: West Virginia
- 1949: Paterson Panthers (AA)
- Positions: End (football); Center (basketball); Outfielder (baseball)

Coaching career (HC unless noted)
- 1950–1951: Walton H.S.
- 1953–1955: Allegany HS (MD)
- 1956–1958: Maryland (ends/freshmen)
- 1959–1968: Richard Montgomery HS (MD)
- 1969–1971: Maryland
- 1972–1978: Paint Branch HS (MD)
- 1979–1993: Magruder HS (MD)

Head coaching record
- Overall: 7–25 (college)

Accomplishments and honors

Championships
- 1975 Maryland Class B State Championship; 1984 Maryland Class B State Championship; 1986 Maryland Class A State Championship

E. Roy Lester (October 3, 1923 – May 3, 2020) was an American college and high school football coach. After a successful career at the high school level, he served as the head coach of the University of Maryland football team from 1969 to 1971. Lester was the school's fourth head coach in five years, and compiled a 7–25 record during his tenure. He was fired after the 1971 season when Maryland finished at the bottom of the Atlantic Coast Conference for the second consecutive year.

Lester returned to coach interscholastic football, including as head coach of Richard Montgomery High School where his teams compiled an 86–10–1 record and six undefeated seasons. His high school teams at Paint Branch and Magruder high schools won three Maryland state championships. Lester attended West Virginia University where he was a three-sport athlete and earned letters in football, baseball, and basketball. He was inducted into the West Virginia University Sports Hall of Fame in 2008.

== Early life ==
Lester grew up in Spencer, West Virginia and attended college at West Virginia University, where he lettered in football, basketball, and baseball. In basketball, he played as a center and recorded 27 points in 21 games during his career. In baseball, he played as an outfielder from 1947 to 1949, and as a senior recorded 53 hits and a .339 batting average. He played college football under famed coaches Bill Kern and Dudley DeGroot as an end in 1948 and participated in the 1949 Sun Bowl. Lester was named to the West Virginia 1940–1949 Team. He graduated in 1949 with a degree in political science. In 1949, Lester played football for the Paterson Panthers of the American Association, a farm team of the Philadelphia Eagles.

== Coaching career ==
=== High school and assistant coach ===
In 1950, Lester began his coaching career at Walton High School in Walton, West Virginia from 1950 to 1951. The following season, he moved on to Allegany High School in Cumberland, Maryland. From 1956 to 1958, Lester served under Tommy Mont as the University of Maryland's ends coach and freshman team coach for three seasons. Lester served as the head football coach at Richard Montgomery High School in Rockville, Maryland, from 1959 to 1968. During his tenure, Richard Montgomery compiled an 86–10–1 record, which included six undefeated seasons. In a time before Maryland hosted high school football playoffs, Lester's teams were considered some of the best in the state.

At the end of his stint at Montgomery in 1968, he held a 25-game winning streak. Future NFL linebacker Mike Curtis was among the players under Lester at Montgomery.

=== Maryland ===
In 1969, Lester was hired as Maryland's fourth head coach in five years. His embattled predecessor, Bob Ward, had been forced out in the face of a player rebellion and a combined 2–17 record. Lester had previously twice applied for the Maryland head coach position. The Daytona Beach Morning Journal speculated that Lester's undisclosed salary probably matched Ward's: $20,000. Lester reintroduced the split-T formation at Maryland, which Jim Tatum had used to great effect there in the 1950s. Lester's philosophy was explained by the Maryland sports information director Jack Zane: "The pass should open up the defense for the running game."

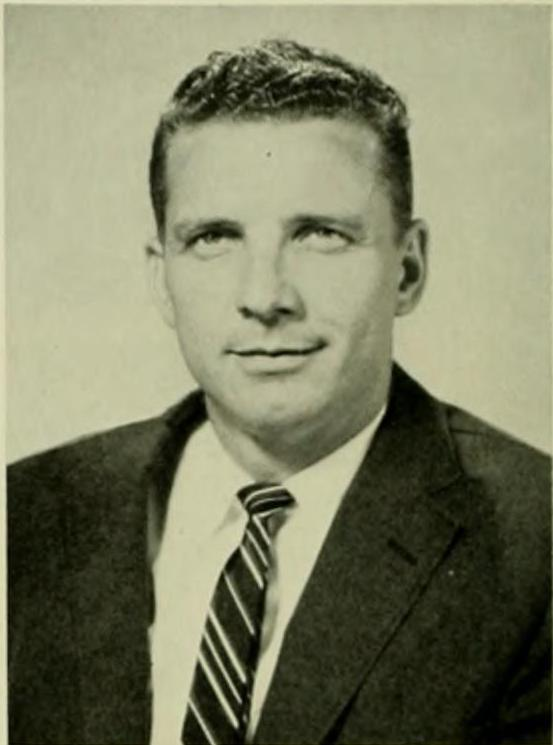
Lester in 1957

In the sixth game of his first season, Maryland's starting quarterback, junior Dennis O'Hara, was injured in a loss at South Carolina, and was replaced by sophomore Jeff Shugars. In the season's penultimate game, Maryland lost to Penn State, 48–0. Penn State halfback Lydell Mitchell had been recruited by Lester and originally intended to go to Maryland before he opted for Penn State instead. Lester was bothered by a similar situation with fullback Franco Harris, whose high school coach was a friend of Lester's. Lester attributed Maryland's football woes to the turnover at head coach and lack of depth because of recruitment shortcomings. Maryland won the finale against Virginia to finish the season with a 3–7 record.

In 1970, Lester's Terrapins finished with a 2–9 record. After an upset loss in the season opener against Villanova, 21–3, Lester shuffled the roster. He switched the positions of eight players, which included Tom Miller from fullback to linebacker. In the previous season, Miller had gained 629 yards, the second-most ever by a Maryland sophomore. After losing their first five games, Maryland beat South Carolina on Homecoming weekend, 21–15, which prompted Maryland fans to tear down the goalposts in celebration. In the 25-mile per hour winds, the Terrapins capitalized on the Gamecocks' poor punting game, which included one blocked punt. Two weeks later, Maryland was beaten by Clemson, which scored 21 points in the fourth quarter to win, 24–11. With the loss, Maryland slid to a 1–7 record, and Lester said he was giving serious consideration to stepping down before the next season. He said, "If I'm not doing the proper job I'm willing to relinquish the job. I took this loss very personally."

In 1971, some observers considered Maryland, which returned 37 lettermen, to be the dark horse in the Atlantic Coast Conference (ACC). Lester said he expected a winning season and that "a lot of people may be surprised." However, the Terrapins dropped the season opener to underdog Villanova once again, 28–13. The Star-News called it the most stunning of five upsets in the ACC teams' opening weekend, rating it ahead of NC State's loss to Kent State, Virginia's loss to Navy, South Carolina's win against Georgia Tech, and Duke's win against Florida. Maryland won the following week against NC State, but then dropped five straight before beating the Virginia Military Institute on Homecoming. Maryland closed the season with losses to Penn State, Clemson, and Virginia to again finish with a 2–9 record.

Lester was fired at the conclusion of the 1971 season. Athletic director Jim Kehoe cited Maryland's worst record in the ACC for two consecutive years and stated his goal of making Maryland a "nationally ranked caliber" team. Kehoe also said, "financial factors are a serious consideration," and that home game attendance had fallen to its lowest point, which threatened the financial well-being of the athletic department. Lester was replaced by Jerry Claiborne, who went on to considerable success in the position. In September 1973, Maryland All-American guard Paul Vellano, then playing under Claiborne, said of the past coaches' difficulties: "A lot of the kids said that Ward was a good coach but that he had a lot of bad apples. Lester was a high school coach and nobody had ever heard of him. I can't understand it. We had nine freshman who were All-Americans my first year here under Lester. Maybe if they had let him stay he could have done the job." One of Lester's lasting contributions was the recruitment of future Maryland and NFL star Randy White. At the end of his tenure, Lester had a combined collegiate coaching record of 7–25.

=== Return to high school coaching ===
In 1972, Lester returned to the interscholastic ranks as a head coach at Paint Branch High School in Burtonsville, Maryland, which awarded him a ten-year contract. It was Paint Branch's third year of varsity football, and their first two campaigns had ended with 3–7 records. About the move, Lester said, "I spent too long treating college players nice and making sure they were happy... I don't have to do that now. I can coach here. If they want to quit, fine." In 1975, he led Paint Branch to the Class B state championship.

From 1979 to 1993, Lester served as head coach at Magruder High School in Rockville, Maryland. In 1984, Lester led Magruder to capture the Class B state championship, and repeated the feat with the Class A state championship in 1986. In 1989, he earned his 200th win as a high school coach when Magruder defeated Einstein, 24–0, bringing his interscholastic record to 200–61. Lester finished his tenure with a 107–47 record at Magruder. Upon the conclusion of his coaching career, he had won 260 games at Montgomery County schools.

== Later life and death ==
In 1996, the Maryland Football Coaches Association inducted Lester into its Hall of Fame. In 2002, Richard Montgomery High School renamed its athletic field Roy Lester Stadium in his honor. In 2008, the West Virginia University Sports Hall of Fame inducted Lester as a member of its 18th class.

Lester resided in Gaithersburg, Maryland and had four children – three sons and a daughter. He died in Rockville, Maryland, on May 3, 2020, at the age of 96. The cause of death was complications from COVID-19 amid the COVID-19 pandemic in Maryland.

== Head coaching record ==
=== College ===
Year	Team	Overall	Conference	Standing	Bowl/playoffs
Maryland Terrapins (Atlantic Coast Conference) (1969–1971)
1969	Maryland	3–7	3–3	T–3rd	
1970	Maryland	2–9	2–4	T–6th	
1971	Maryland	2–9	1–5	8th	
Maryland:		7–25	6–12		
Total:		7–25			
