= Doug Wyatt =

American football player (born 1946)

John Douglas Wyatt
Profile
- Position: Defensive back

Personal information
- Born: October 18, 1946 (age 80); Tyler, Texas, U.S.

Career information
- College: Tulsa
- NFL draft: 1970: 17thth round

Career history
- 1970–1972: New Orleans Saints
- 1973–1974: Detroit Lions
- Stats at Pro Football Reference

John Douglas Wyatt (born October 18, 1946) is an American former professional football player who was a defensive back for five seasons in the National Football League (NFL) for the New Orleans Saints and Detroit Lions. He played college football for the Tulsa Golden Hurricane.

Wyatt attended John Tyler Highschool in Tyler Texas where he lettered in three sports. Football, Baseball and Basketball. He attended Tulsa on a football scholarship in 1966. Wyatt was a three-time all-Missouri Valley Conference selection as a defensive back for the Golden Hurricane in 1967, 1968 and 1969. He also returned punts and handled field goal kicking and points after touchdown in his sophomore and junior seasons. He tallied a team-high eight pass breakups and was second in tackles with 72 as a junior in 1968. He was looked at to be Dallas Cowboys number one draft pick in the 1969 draft to play strong safety, however he underwent knee surgery in the spring before his senior season after an injury on the practice field. As a senior, Wyatt came back to lead Tulsa with five interceptions for 41 yards and 10 pass breakups while recording 66 tackles. He had totals of 53 points as a sophomore and 25 points his junior season on conversions and field goals, and also totaled 312 yards on 25 punt returns in those two seasons. He played in the Hula Bowl after his senior campaign. Before the draft, Wyatt was helping the state of Texas with highway cleanup in 1969, when he picked up a 7 Up bottle that had been lying on the highway easement. When he rinsed off the bottle, it exploded from the Texas heat and a piece of shrapnel hit him in his left eye. Wyatt has been blind in that eye to this day. However Doug never disclosed his injury to anyone. Wyatt was taken in the 17th round as a gamble, but ended up starting the first game for the New Orleans Saints playing blind in one eye every play. Wyatt started three seasons with the Saints and was traded to Detroit. He played two seasons in Detroit. Wyatt was inducted to the Tulsa Hall of Fame in 2006 for football and the Tyler Athletics Hall of Fame in 2019. He is still an avid Saints and Lions Fan. He currently resides in Cypress Texas.
