= Ray Callahan =

American football player and coach (1933–2017)

Biographical details
- Born: April 28, 1933; Loretto, Kentucky, U.S.
- Died: September 2, 2017 (aged 84); Bracey, Virginia, U.S.

Playing career
- 1953–1956: Kentucky

Coaching career (HC unless noted)
- 1963–1966: Kentucky (assistant)
- 1967–1968: Cincinnati (assistant)
- 1969–1972: Cincinnati
- 1973: Baltimore Colts (LB)
- 1974: Florida Blazers (assistant)
- 1975-1977: Chicago Bears (OL)
- 1978–1980: Washington Redskins (OL)
- 1981–1982: Houston Oilers (DL)
- 1983–1989: New York Jets (DL)

Head coaching record
- Overall: 20–23

Kenneth Ray Callahan (April 28, 1933 – September 2, 2017) was an American football player and coach. He was recruited by Coach Paul Bear Bryant at the University of Kentucky in 1952 under a full scholarship. Coach Bryant mentored him often taking him fishing and along on other recruiting trips to convince players to come to U.K. to play. He later coached for his alma mater as an assistant coach from 1963 to 1966. He then moved to University of Cincinnati as an assistant coach for 2 years before becoming the head football coach from 1969 to 1972, compiling a record of 20–23. His first pro team was in 1973 with the Baltimore Colts as a linebacker coach under former teammate Howard Schnellenberger. Callahan then took a chance with the World Football League Florida Blazers with Jack Pardee. The Blazers made it to the World Bowl losing to the Birmingham Americans by 1 point but with controversy in the officiating. Coach Callahan then bolted back to the NFL with the Chicago Bears as the offensive line coach in front of Walter Peyton for his first 3 years as a player. The Washington Redskins was his next stop for 3 years of offensive line coach again with Jack Pardee at the helm. Callahan then headed south to Texas with the Houston Oilers as the defensive line coach for 2 years. Joe Walton then called upon Ray Callahan to lead up the defensive line "sack exchange" consisting of Barry Bennett, Marty Lyons, Joe Klecko, Mark Gastineau, of the New York Jets for the next 7 years. Callahan retired to Bracey, Va on Lake Gaston and enjoyed lake life with his high school sweetheart wife Essie "Lee" Dorsey. Callahan died on September 2, 2017.

== Head coaching record ==
Year	Team	Overall	Conference	Standing	Bowl/playoffs
Cincinnati Bearcats (Missouri Valley Conference) (1969)
1969	Cincinnati	4–6	2–3	T–3rd	
Cincinnati Bearcats (NCAA University Division independent) (1970–1972)
1970	Cincinnati	7–4			
1971	Cincinnati	7–4			
1972	Cincinnati	2–9			
Cincinnati:		20–23	2–3		
Total:		20–23			
