= Dick Blanchard =

American football player (born 1949)

No. 49
- Position: Linebacker

Personal information
- Born: January 17, 1949 (age 77); Waukesha, Wisconsin, U.S.
- Listed height: 6 ft 3 in (1.91 m)
- Listed weight: 225 lb (102 kg)

Career information
- High school: Rich Central
- College: Tulsa
- NFL draft: 1972: undrafted

Career history
- New England Patriots (1972); Detroit Wheels (1974)

Career NFL statistics
- Interceptions: 1
- Stats at Pro Football Reference

Richard L. Blanchard (born January 17, 1949) is a former linebacker in the National Football League (NFL). He played college football for the University of Tulsa and later played professionally with the New England Patriots during the 1972 NFL season. After being cut by the Patriots and sitting out the 1973 season, he signed with the Detroit Wheels of the World Football League (WFL) in 1974.
