= Johnson Hagood Stadium =

Football stadium in Charleston, South Carolina

Coordinates: 32°47′37″N 79°57′21″W

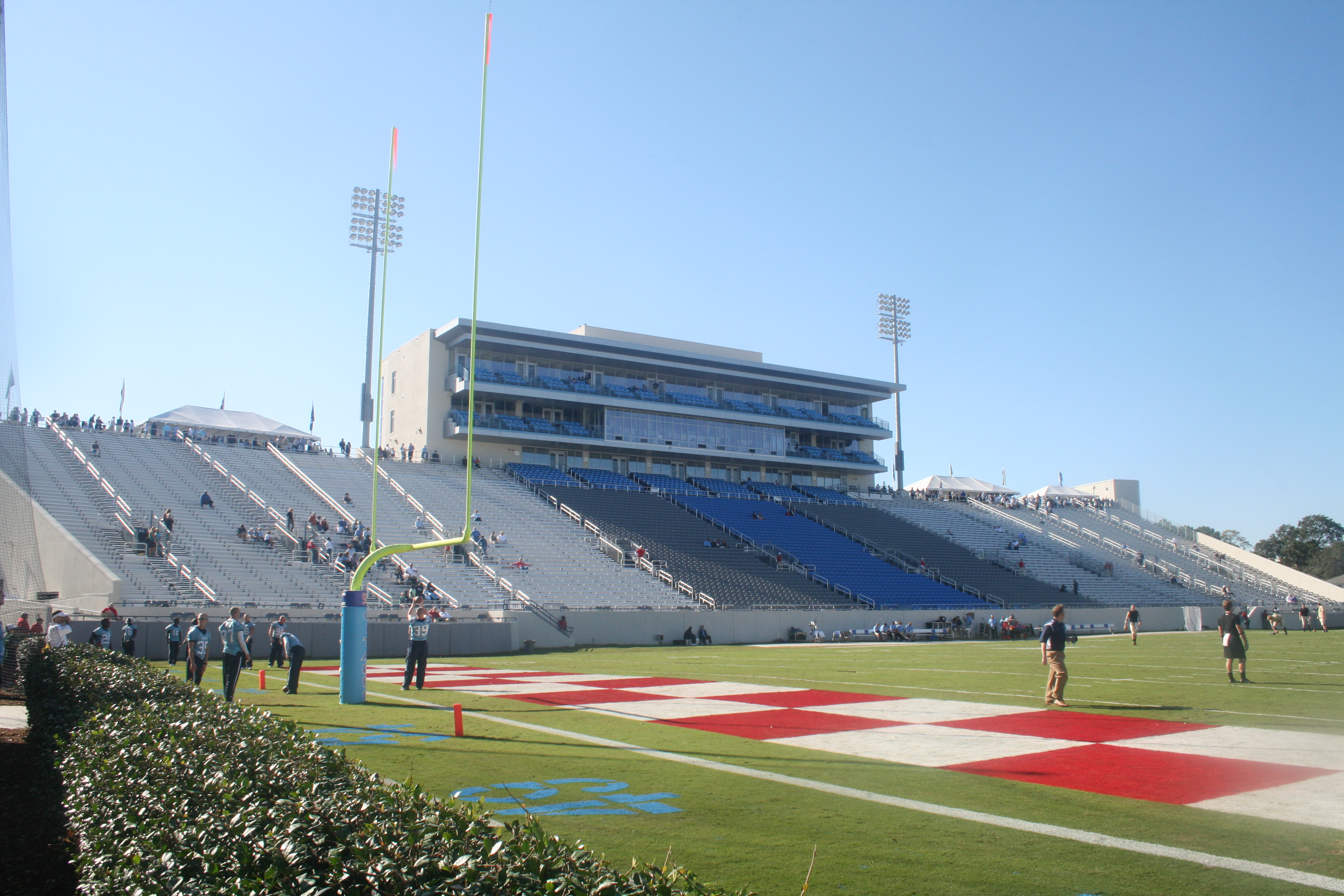
- Interior view of the stadium in 2009
- Interactive map of Johnson Hagood Stadium
- Address: 68 Hagood Avenue
- Location: Charleston, South Carolina, United States
- Owner: The Citadel
- Operator: The Citadel Athletics
- Capacity: 12,500 (2017–present) Former capacity: List: 22,342 (1949–1959); 22,500 (1960–1996); 21,000 (1997–2003); 12,500 (2004–2005); 21,000 (2006–2016)
- Type: Stadium
- Surface: Artificial turf
- Current use: Football

Construction
- Groundbreaking: 1946
- Opened: October 16, 1948; 77 years ago
- Cost: $600,000 ($8.04 million in 2025 dollars) $42 million (2005 renovation)
- Architects: Halsey & Cummings; Heery International Inc. (2005 renovation)

Tenant
- The Citadel Bulldogs football

Website
- citadelsports.com/johnson-hagood-stadium

Johnson Hagood Stadium is an 11,500-seat football stadium, the home field of The Citadel Bulldogs football team, in Charleston, South Carolina, United States. The stadium is named in honor of Brigadier General Johnson Hagood, CSA, class of 1847, who commanded Confederate forces in Charleston during the Civil War and later served as Comptroller and Governor of South Carolina.

== Original stadium ==
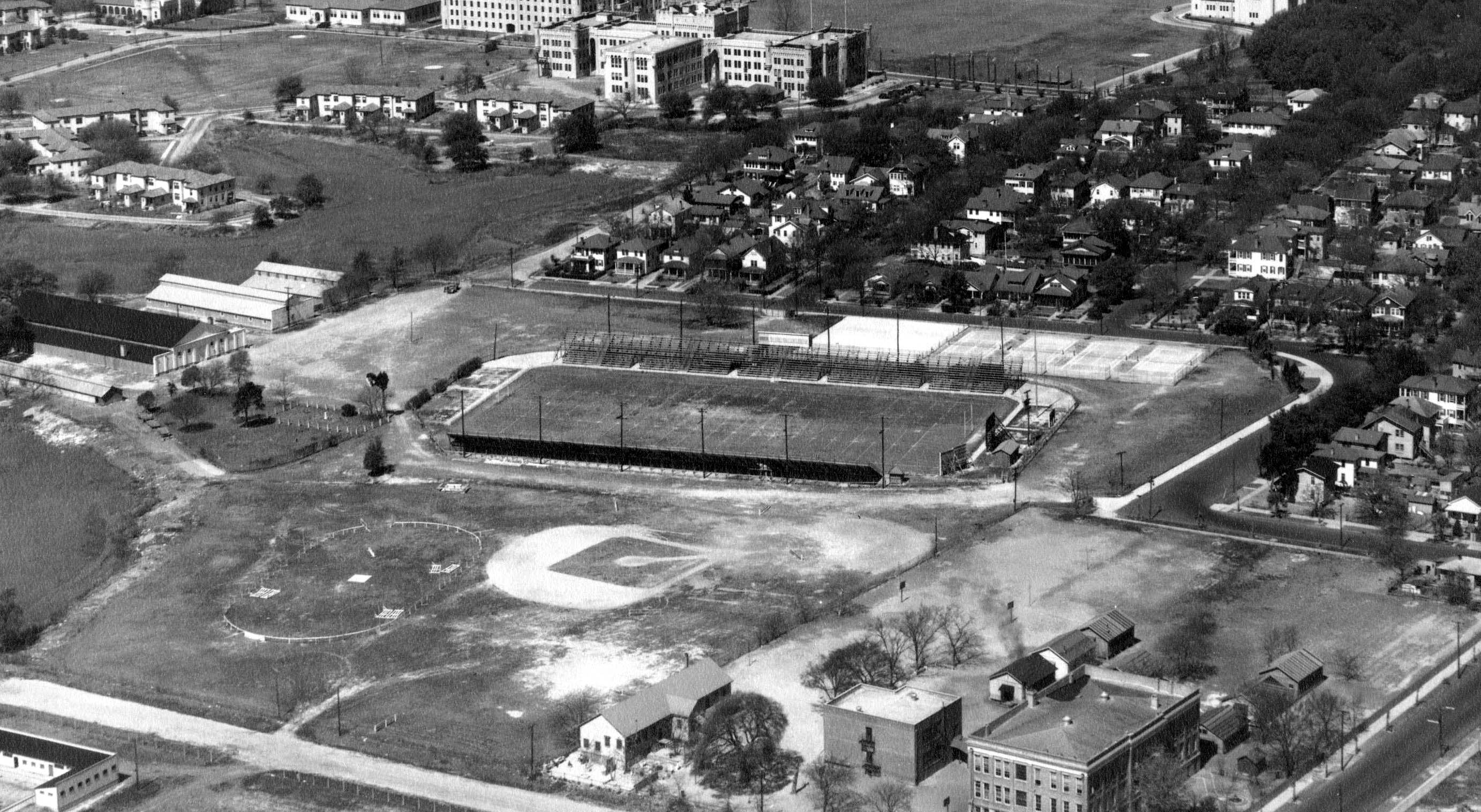
The original Johnson Hagood Stadium was built by the City of Charleston and opened in 1927, just to the southeast of the campus.

When the condition of the existing College Park Stadium (located in the northeast corner of Hampton Park) became so poor as to be unserviceable, the city of Charleston chose to construct a new sports stadium just south of the new campus of The Citadel, on Hagood Avenue.

The new stadium was opened October 15, 1927, with a football game between The Citadel and Oglethorpe.

The original stadium seated 10,000 fans and was oriented east–west, perpendicular to the current layout.

== Current stadium ==
The current Johnson Hagood Stadium was designed by the architectural firm of Halsey & Cummings. It opened with seating for 22,343 on October 16, 1948, with a game between The Citadel and Davidson. The formal dedication of the new $600,000 stadium took place at The Citadel-Clemson football game held on December 4, 1948, before a then-record crowd of approximately 16,000. The Citadel suggested buying the stadium from the city in 1962; it wanted it for its sports program, and the city considered it a "white elephant." It was eventually purchased by The Citadel from the city of Charleston in October 1963 for $240,000 and the assumption of the balance on an issuance of $150,000 in municipal bonds.

The historic facility gained national attention during summer 1999 when remains of crewmen from the H. L. Hunley, the first submarine to sink an enemy battleship, were unearthed from underneath the stadium. The location of the stadium had once been a mariners' graveyard. In 1948, when the stadium was being built, a miscommunication led to the gravestones being moved, but not the bodies. In 1993, the bodies of 13 sailors were discovered under the parking lot. After the discovery of the sunken Hunley in 1995, there was renewed interest in the remains of its first crew, who had died in an unsuccessful 1863 run. Archaeologists were given permission to conduct more thorough searches as part of the renovations of the stadium, and four of the five sailors' bodies were located under the home stands. The remains were reinterred at Magnolia Cemetery.

During rebuilding of the East Side stands in 2026, an additional 50 human remains were discovered prompting a halt to construction in order to exhume and reinter the remains.

=== Enhancements and west side renovation ===
In 2001, The Citadel opened the Altman Athletic Center located in the South end zone. The facility features home and visitor locker rooms, officials’ room and a spacious entertainment area for members of The Citadel Brigadier Foundation.

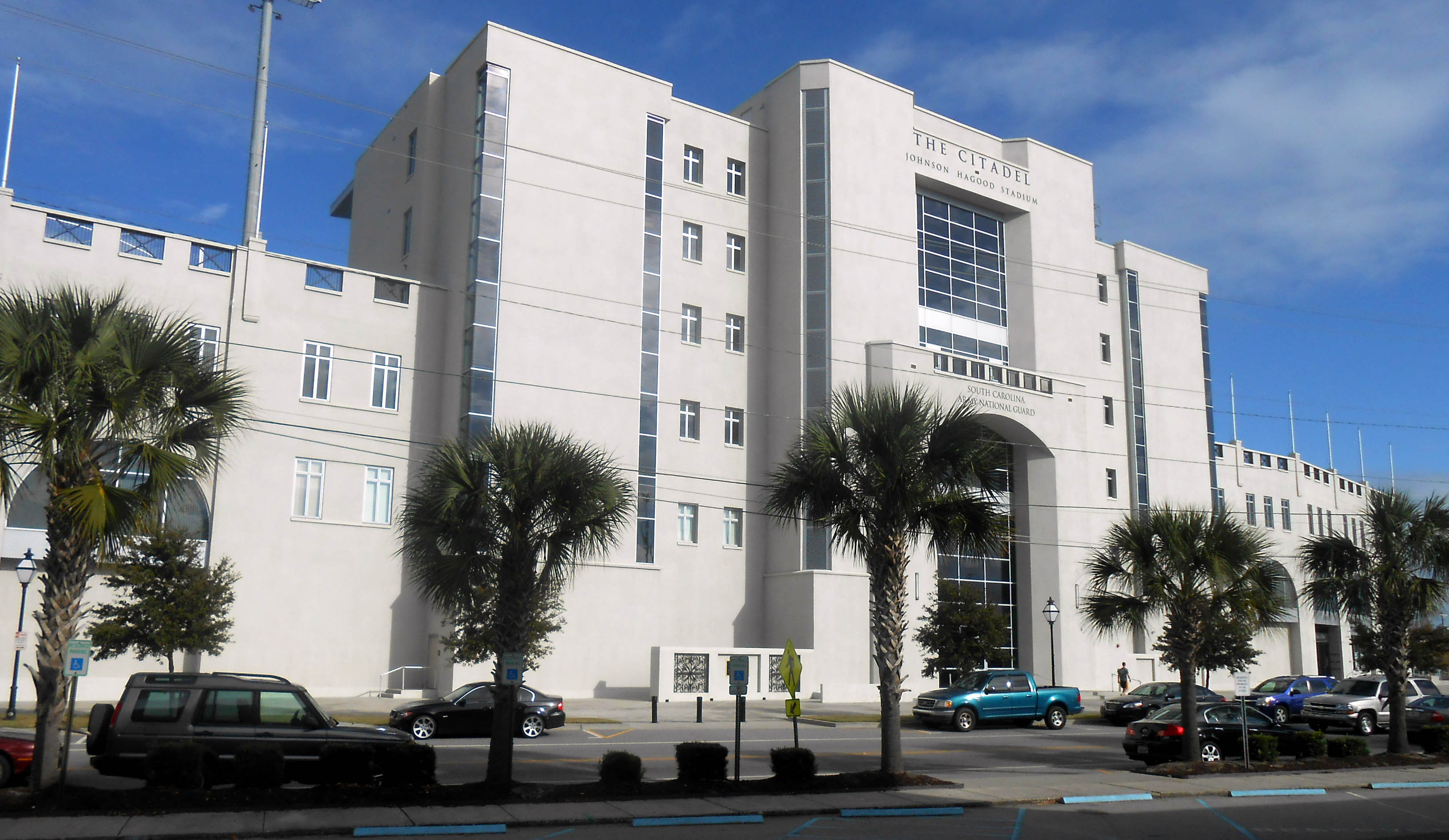
The west façade of Johnson Hagood Stadium was greatly expanded during the 2005 renovations.

In 2005, stadium underwent a major renovation to update the facility by adding an improved media center, luxury skyboxes, and other features. In September 2004, the Board of Visitors (its governing body) approved plans to build a new stadium on nearby Stoney Field (on Fishburne Street, adjacent to the Riley Ballpark), but there were concerns about funding the $47 million project and also about engineering issues associated with building on marshy land. In February 2005, The Citadel opted to make changes to the existing facility instead.

In 2008, the West Side Tower opened. The completed project features luxury suites, club seats, a press box. The field was named Sansom Field in 2008, commemorating alumnus William B. Sansom, a 1964 graduate.

=== Issues with east side stands ===
In 2016, The Citadel determined that lead paint needed remediation on the east (visitor's) side of the stadium. The work resulted in the entire east side being closed for the first game of the 2016 season and some sections being opened for subsequent games. The resulting capacity was 10,500 for the first game, and about 15,000 for later games. The Board of Visitors decided to fully renovate the east side of the stadium, announcing that decision on December 2, 2016. In May 2017, demolition began on the east side stands, were replaced by temporary seating for 1,000 people during the next two seasons; in August 2017, The Citadel Board of Visitors approved a plan to build new stands on the east side that seats 3,800 ready for the 2019 season. Fundraising efforts remain underway, and construction has yet to begin. When The Citadel applied to replace the stands with permanent seating for 2000 spectators and to build a toilet building, the City's Board of Architectural Review unanimously rejected the plans for lack of quality.

After long delays for fundraising and architectural reviews, construction began in the spring of 2026 on a 133,000 square foot addition, which would increase capacity by 2,000 and provide concession and restroom space for fans.

== Stadium name and controversy ==
The stadium is named for General Hagood, who is most known for commanding Confederate forces during the attack on Fort Wagner by the 54th Massachusetts Colored Troops. He is alleged to have made comments regarding the burial of the 54th's white commander Robert Gould Shaw, saying "we buried him with his niggers." After the war, he was active in South Carolina politics, serving as Comptroller and Governor. During his term as governor, he was instrumental in reopening The Citadel after its occupation by Federal troops, who used the facility as its Charleston headquarters during the Reconstruction era.

In the aftermath of the murder of George Floyd and the protests that followed, a group of Citadel alumni began organizing to change the name of the stadium. This group was particularly concerned by the alleged statements made by General Hagood regarding the battle at Fort Wagner and its aftermath. The Citadel has stated that the name of the stadium cannot be changed without the agreement of the South Carolina legislature.

== Stadium uses ==
In addition to Citadel football games, the stadium hosts high school football games for Oceanside Collegiate Academy, as well as the Sertoma Football Classic, a series of football scrimmages which raises money for charity and also marks the beginning of the Charleston area high school football season. The venue hosted the 1983 NCAA Division I-AA Football Championship Game (won by Southern Illinois) and the 1984 NCAA Division I-AA Football Championship Game (won by Montana State). The stadium has hosted three home Citadel playoff games; two in 1992 and one in 2016.

The Citadel had applied for a "special event permit"--needed for events attracting more than 1000 attendees--in April 2023 to hold a series of musical concerts but withdrew the request before the City acted. In January 2024, The Citadel disclosed that it was planning a series of 6 to 10 country music concerts at the football stadium. When told that zoning did not allow a concert series in the stadium, The Citadel sought a private ruling from the City Zoning Administrator that it was exempt. The City Zoning Administrator, however, rejected the zoning approval: "The level of intensity of the proposed concert series and lack of a connection between the concert series and the approved school use leads me to conclude that concerts are not permitted by the zoning of the property." The Citadel appealed to the Board of Zoning Appeals. The Zoning Board, however, sided unanimously with the "blindsided" neighbors and rejected The Citadel's request. Citadel officials apologized for its tactic of not disclosing its plans with neighbors: "We punted this one into the stands."

Having lost before the Zoning Board, Citadel President Gen. Walters still wanted to see the concert series in October 2024. Likewise, in July 2025, The Citadel's athletic director confirmed the school remained interested in using the football stadium for concerts.

In January 2026, South Carolina state senator and Citadel alumnus Ed Sutton introduced a bill which would excuse public colleges like The Citadel from zoning limits on the events held on their facilities. The surrounding neighborhood and the City of Charleston both strongly opposed the bill.

=== Top single-game attendance ===
This table shows the top 10 attendance figures for The Citadel at Johnson Hagood Stadium:

Date	Opponent	Attendance	Result
October 17, 1992	Marshall	23,025	L 13–34
November 14, 1992	VMI	21,811	W 50–0
November 23, 1991	Furman	21,623	W 10–6
October 25, 1969	Davidson	21,573	W 34–28
September 18, 1976	Delaware	21,570	W 17–15
September 13, 1975	Presbyterian	21,465	W 21–0
October 11, 1969	William & Mary	21,460	L 14–24
November 1, 2003	Wofford	20,863	L 16–42
September 24, 1988	Navy	20,754	W 42–35
September 12, 1992	Wofford	20,710	W 30–13

== See also ==
- List of NCAA Division I FCS football stadiums

Preceded by Memorial Stadium (Wichita Falls, TX)	Host of the NCAA Div. I-AA Championship Game; 1983–1984	Succeeded by Tacoma Dome
