= 1969 Liberty Bowl =

American college football game

- 11th Liberty Bowl
Alabama Crimson Tide	Colorado Buffaloes
(6–4)	(7–3)
SEC	Big Eight
33	47
Head coach: Bear Bryant	Head coach: Eddie Crowder
	1	2	3	4	Total
Alabama	0	19	14	0	33
Colorado	10	21	0	16	47
- Date: December 13, 1969
- Season: 1969
- Stadium: Memphis Memorial Stadium
- Location: Memphis, Tennessee
- MVP: Bobby Anderson, Colorado TB
- Favorite: Colorado by 1
- Attendance: 50,144

United States TV coverage
- Network: ABC
- Announcers: Chris Schenkel, Bud Wilkinson

The 1969 Liberty Bowl, part of the 1969 bowl game season, took place on Saturday, December 13, at Memphis Memorial Stadium in Memphis, Tennessee. The competing teams in the eleventh edition of the Liberty Bowl were the Alabama Crimson Tide of the Southeastern Conference (SEC), and the Colorado Buffaloes of the Big Eight Conference. Favored by a point, Colorado won 47–33.

== Teams ==
=== Alabama ===
Alabama finished the regular season with losses to Vanderbilt, Tennessee, LSU, and Auburn to compile a 6–4 record. Following their victory over Miami, the Crimson Tide accepted an invitation to play in the Liberty Bowl on November 17. The appearance marked the second for Alabama in the Liberty Bowl, and their 23rd overall bowl game.

=== Colorado ===
Colorado lost to Penn State, Oklahoma, and Nebraska to compile a 7–3 record in the regular season. Following their victory over Kansas State, the Buffaloes accepted an invitation to play in the Liberty Bowl on November 22. It was the first Liberty Bowl for Colorado and their fifth bowl appearance.

== Game summary ==
The game kicked off shortly after 12:20 pm CST. During the coin toss, Colorado linebacker Bill Collins, who was Black, symbolically went out to midfield alone, where he was met by roughly 40 white members of Alabama's team, which had yet to be integrated.

In a game dominated by both offenses, Colorado took a 10–0 first quarter lead. Ward Walsh scored first on a 13-yard touchdown run and Dave Haney connected on a 30-yard field goal for the Buffaloes. Early in the second quarter, Colorado extended their lead to 17–0 after a three-yard Bobby Anderson touchdown run. Alabama responded with touchdown runs of 31-yards from Scott Hunter and six-yards from George Ranager to cut the lead to 17–13. With less than three minutes remaining in the half, Walsh scored again on 15-yard touchdown run. On the ensuing drive, Alabama responded with a two-yard Johnny Musso touchdown run to make the score 24–19. However, the following kickoff was returned 91-yards by Steve Engel to give the Buffaloes a 31–19 lead at the half.

In the third quarter, Alabama took their only lead of the game following a pair of Neb Hayden touchdown passes; the first came on a 55-yard reception by Griff Langston and the second on a ten-yard reception by Musso to give the Crimson Tide a 33–31 lead. Colorado then scored 16 fourth quarter points to seal the 47–33 victory with a pair of Anderson touchdown runs and a safety made when Bill Brundige and Herb Orvis sacked Hayden in the endzone.

Scoring summary

Quarter	Time	Drive			Team	Scoring information	Score	
Quarter	Time	Plays	Yards	TOP	Team	Scoring information	Alabama	Colorado
1	11:36				Colorado	Ward Walsh 13-yard touchdown run, Dave Haney kick good	0	7
1	4:54				Colorado	30-yard field goal by Dave Haney	0	10
2	12:38				Colorado	Bobby Anderson 3-yard touchdown run, Dave Haney kick good	0	17
2	10:13				Alabama	Scott Hunter 31-yard touchdown run, Oran Buck kick good	7	17
2	4:49				Alabama	George Ranager 6-yard touchdown run, 2-point pass incomplete	13	17
2	2:38				Colorado	Ward Walsh 15-yard touchdown run, Dave Haney kick good	13	24
2	1:01				Alabama	Johnny Musso 2-yard touchdown run, 2-point run failed	19	24
2	0:46				Colorado	Steve Engel 91-yard kickoff return for a touchdown, Dave Haney kick good	19	31
3	13:39				Alabama	Griff Langston 55-yard touchdown reception from Neb Hayden, Oran Buck kick good	26	31
3	7:47				Alabama	Johnny Musso 10-yard touchdown reception from Neb Hayden, Oran Buck kick good	33	31
4	10:57				Colorado	Bobby Anderson 2-yard touchdown run, Dave Haney kick good	33	38
4	2:48				Colorado	Neb Hayden tackled in end zone for a safety by Bill Brundige and Herb Orvis	33	40
4	0:45				Colorado	Bobby Anderson 3-yard touchdown run, Dave Haney kick good	33	47
"TOP" = time of possession. For other American football terms, see Glossary of American football.							33	47
