= Herman Weaver =

American football player (born 1948)

No. 18
- Position: Punter

Personal information
- Born: November 17, 1948 (age 77); Villa Rica, Georgia, U.S.
- Listed height: 6 ft 4 in (1.93 m)
- Listed weight: 210 lb (95 kg)

Career information
- High school: Villa Rica
- College: Tennessee
- NFL draft: 1970: 9th round, 227th overall pick

Career history
- Detroit Lions (1970–1976); Seattle Seahawks (1977–1980); Michigan Panthers (USFL) (1983)

Awards and highlights
- NFC Punter of the Year (1975); The Sporting News Top 20 Punters of All Time (1988)

Career NFL statistics
- Punts: 693
- Punt yards: 27,897
- Yards per punt: 40.3
- Longest punt: 69
- Stats at Pro Football Reference

William Herman Weaver (born November 17, 1948), nicknamed "Thunderfoot", is an American former professional football player who spent 11 seasons as a punter in the National Football League (NFL). A ninth-round selection of the Detroit Lions in the 1970 NFL draft, he punted for the Lions for seven seasons before spending his final four with the Seattle Seahawks. Known for the unusually high hang time he generated — a trait that produced his nickname — Weaver ranked among the NFL's ten best punters in yards per punt four times and was named the National Football Conference (NFC) Punter of the Year in 1975. In 1988, The Sporting News named him one of the top 20 punters of all time.

Weaver finished his career with 693 punts for 27,897 yards, an average of 40.3 yards per punt. At the time he retired he ranked tenth in NFL history in punts and eleventh in punting yards. He also shares the league record for the most punts blocked in a career, with 14. After leaving football he taught and coached at the high school level before founding Thunderfoot Ministries, through which he has spoken to more than a million students about substance abuse.

== Early life ==
Weaver was born on November 17, 1948, in Villa Rica, Georgia, one of five brothers. He attended Villa Rica High School, where he was an All-State wide receiver on the football team and also played quarterback and punter. He was an all-state selection in basketball as well.

== College career ==
A standout performance against Douglas County High School earned Weaver a scholarship offer from the Tennessee Volunteers of the Southeastern Conference (SEC). He played wide receiver as a freshman, but head coach Doug Dickey moved the 6-foot-4-inch Weaver to punter for his sophomore season in 1967. He went on to record a long punt of 71 yards and a school-record hang time of 5.7 seconds.

Weaver's punting was credited as a decisive factor in Tennessee's 24–7 win over Georgia Tech on October 12, 1968, his junior season. He punted nine times for a 42.9-yard average with a long of 59 yards, and was named SEC Defensive Player of the Week. Later that season he matched Georgia's Spike Jones punt for punt in a 17–17 tie, averaging 44.8 yards on 14 attempts to Jones's 44.9 on eight. In the Volunteers' loss to the Texas Longhorns in the Cotton Bowl on January 1, 1969, Weaver had punts of 67 and 52 yards.

As a senior in 1969, Weaver averaged 41.2 yards on 53 punts and finished second in the SEC, again behind Jones, who went on to punt seven seasons in the NFL. His college career ended with a 14–13 defeat to the Florida Gators in the 1969 Gator Bowl, in which inadequate protection on his first punt allowed Florida's Steve Tannen to block the kick; Mike Kelley recovered and returned it for a touchdown.

== Professional career ==
=== Detroit Lions ===
The Detroit Lions selected Weaver in the ninth round of the 1970 NFL draft, 227th overall. Hang time rather than raw distance was his calling card from the outset: against a contemporary benchmark of about 4.5 seconds, Weaver was consistently recorded at 4.8 and 4.9 seconds in the Lions' first two exhibition games of 1970, reaching 5.4 seconds, while holding down opponents' return yardage.

Weaver won the job as a rookie and averaged 40.0 yards on 62 punts, 17th among NFL punters. That season produced the only playoff appearance of his career, a 5–0 divisional-round loss to the Dallas Cowboys in the 1970–71 playoffs. In a game decided by field position, Weaver punted eight times for a 48.9-yard average with a long of 61 yards, and only four of the eight were returned, for a total of 23 yards.

He improved to 41.7 yards per punt in 1971, seventh best in the league, and ranked fifth in 1973 at 43.2 yards, the highest single-season average of his career. His best season came in 1975, when he averaged 42.0 yards on a career-high 80 punts to finish first in the National Football Conference and second in the NFL behind only future Hall of Famer Ray Guy. In seven seasons with Detroit he punted 436 times for 17,715 yards, a 40.6-yard average.

=== Seattle Seahawks ===
After the 1976 season the Lions traded Weaver to the Denver Broncos for a draft pick, but Denver released him before the start of the 1977 season. Weaver was picked up by the Seattle Seahawks, who signed him in September 1977, and he held the job for the next four seasons.

Weaver punted 257 times for 10,182 yards in Seattle, making him one of only six punters to reach 10,000 punting yards for the franchise, and he remains tied for the second-most punts in a game in club history with 11. He placed 48 punts inside the opponents' 20-yard line as a Seahawk. His final NFL season, 1980, was among his best: he averaged 41.8 yards per punt, eighth in the league. Seattle waived him in late August 1981, ending his NFL career.

Across 11 seasons and 158 games, Weaver punted 693 times for 27,897 yards, a 40.3-yard average, with a long of 69 yards, 25 touchbacks and 14 blocked punts.

=== United States Football League ===
Weaver returned to the field in 1983, punting in three games for the Michigan Panthers of the United States Football League.

=== "Thunderfoot" nickname ===
Weaver acquired the nickname "Thunderfoot" from sportscaster Howard Cosell, then part of the Monday Night Football broadcast team. Cosell was taking notes at a Lions practice on the day of a Monday night game when Weaver launched a punt; as the ball reached its apex, a clap of thunder shook the ground. By Weaver's account, Lions placekicker Errol Mann told Cosell that it thundered every time Weaver's punts reached their peak, and Cosell repeated the story on the air.

== Legacy and honors ==
Weaver was named NFC Punter of the Year in 1975, and in 1988 The Sporting News named him one of the top 20 punters of all time. He was inducted into the Greater Chattanooga Sports Hall of Fame in February 2012.

When Weaver retired after the 1980 season, his 693 punts were the tenth most in NFL history, his 27,897 punting yards the eleventh most, and his 40.3-yard average ranked 29th all time. Through the 2025 season he ranks 69th in career punts and 75th in career punting yards. He also shares the NFL record for the most punts blocked in a career, 14, with Harry Newsome.

== Personal life ==
Weaver has said that his outlook changed in 1977, after his young daughter fell about 20 feet (6.1 m) from a tree and lay motionless. He rushed her to a hospital and waited in the emergency room to learn whether she would walk again, praying for her recovery; he has described the experience as the turning point that reordered the way he lived.

After retiring from football, Weaver completed his degree at the University of Tennessee and spent ten years as a high school teacher and coach, including stints on the football staffs at Notre Dame High School and Chattanooga Valley in the Chattanooga area. He then became a Christian minister and founded Thunderfoot Ministries, traveling the country to speak in schools about avoiding drugs and alcohol. By 2015 he estimated he had appeared at some 3,000 schools before more than a million students. During the 1990s he was one of nine Christian athletes sponsored by Sports World Inc. to give motivational speeches across the United States. Speaking in both public and religious schools, Weaver has emphasized that while he discusses his faith he does not attempt to impose his beliefs on his audiences.

His son, Bill Weaver, was a four-year letterman at Georgia Tech from 1989 to 1992 and a member of the 1990 team that finished 11–0–1 and was ranked first nationally by United Press International and second by the Associated Press.

== Career statistics ==
Regular season

Led the league
Denotes NFL record

Season	Team	GP	Punting					
Season	Team	GP	Punts	Yards	Y/P	Net	In20	TB
1970	Detroit	14	62	2,483	40.0		65	1
1971	Detroit	13	42	1,752	41.7		63	2
1972	Detroit	14	43	1,734	40.3		55	0
1973	Detroit	14	54	2,333	43.2		66	1
1974	Detroit	14	72	2,772	38.5		61	2
1975	Detroit	14	80	3,361	42.0		61	1
1976	Detroit	14	83	3,280	39.5		69	1
1977	Seattle	13	58	2,293	39.5		59	1
1978	Seattle	16	66	2,440	37.0		59	0
1979	Seattle	16	66	2,651	40.2		60	3
1980	Seattle	16	67	2,798	41.8		69	2
Career		158	693	27,897	40.3		69	14

Postseason

Postseason punting
Year	Team	G	Punts	Yards	Avg	Long	Blk
1970	Detroit	1	8	391	48.9	61	0
