= List of Florida Gators football seasons =

The Florida Gators football team represents the University of Florida in the sport of American football. The university fielded its first official varsity football team in the fall of 1906, and has fielded a team every season since then, with the exception of 1943 during World War II. The University of Florida did not adopt the "Florida Gators" nickname for its sports teams until 1911, and the early Florida football teams were known simply as "Florida" or the "Orange and Blue." The football team played most of their home games at on-campus Fleming Field until 1930, when Florida Field was constructed.

During the early 1900s, the Florida football team competed in the Intercollegiate Athletic Association of the United States (IAAUS), but was not affiliated with an athletic conference. Later, Florida was a member of the Southern Intercollegiate Athletic Association and the Southern Conference, before joining with a dozen other schools to establish the Southeastern Conference (SEC) in 1932. Since 1992, the Gators have competed in the National Collegiate Athletic Association (NCAA) Football Bowl Subdivision (FBS, formerly known as "Division I-A"), and the Eastern Division of the SEC.

The list below list presents the season-by-season win–loss records of the Gators football team from its beginning, including its post-season bowl records.

== Seasons ==
Year	Coach	Overall	Conference	Standing	Bowl/playoffs	Coaches^{#}	AP^{°}
Jack Forsythe (Independent) (1906–1908)
1906	Jack Forsythe	5–3					
1907	Jack Forsythe	4–1–1					
1908	Jack Forsythe	5–2–1					
George E. Pyle (Independent) (1909–1911)
1909	George E. Pyle	6–1–1					
1910	George E. Pyle	6–1					
1911	George E. Pyle	5–0–1					
George E. Pyle (SIAA) (1912–1913)
1912	George E. Pyle	5–2–1	0–2–1	16th			
1913	George E. Pyle	4–3	2–2	T–8th			
Charles J. McCoy (SIAA) (1914–1916)
1914	Charles J. McCoy	5–2	3–2	7th			
1915	Charles J. McCoy	4–3	3–3	10th			
1916	Charles J. McCoy	0–5	0–4	25th			
Alfred L. Buser (SIAA) (1917–1919)
1917	Alfred L. Buser	2–4	1–3	T–13th			
1918	Alfred E. Buser	0–1	0–0	N/A			
1919	Alfred E. Buser	5–3	2–2	13th			
William G. Kline (SIAA) (1920–1921)
1920	William G. Kline	6–3	1–2	16th			
1921	William G. Kline	6–3–2	4–1–2	6th			
William G. Kline (Southern) (1922)
1922	William G. Kline	7–2	2–0	5th			
James Van Fleet (Southern) (1923–1924)
1923	James Van Fleet	6–1–2	1–0–2	3rd			
1924	James Van Fleet	6–2–2	2–0–1	2nd			
Harold Sebring (Southern) (1925–1927)
1925	Harold Sebring	8–2	3–2	8th			
1926	Harold Sebring	2–6–2	1–4–1	T–19th			
1927	Harold Sebring	7–3	5–2	6th			
Charlie Bachman (Southern) (1928–1932)
1928	Charlie Bachman	8–1	6–1	3rd			
1929	Charlie Bachman	8–2	6–1	4th			
1930	Charlie Bachman	6–3–1	4–2–1	7th			
1931	Charlie Bachman	2–6–2	2–4–2	15th			
1932	Charlie Bachman	3–6	1–6	20th			
Dennis K. Stanley (SEC) (1933–1935)
1933	Dennis K. Stanley	5–3–1	2–3	T–9th			
1934	Dennis K. Stanley	6–3–1	2–2–1	7th			
1935	Dennis K. Stanley	3–7	1–6	12th			
Josh Cody (SEC) (1936–1939)
1936	Josh Cody	4–6	1–5	11th			
1937	Josh Cody	4–7	3–4	8th			
1938	Josh Cody	4–6–1	2–2–1	7th			
1939	Josh Cody	5–5–1	0–3–1	12th			
Thomas Lieb (SEC) (1940–1946)
1940	Thomas Lieb	5–5	2–3	8th			
1941	Thomas Lieb	4–6	1–3	10th			
1942	Thomas Lieb	3–7	1–3	9th			
1943	No team						
1944	Thomas Lieb	4–3	0–3	10th			
1945	Thomas Lieb	4–5–1	1–3–1	T–10th			
Raymond Wolf (SEC) (1946–1949)
1946	Raymond Wolf	0–9	0–5	12th			
1947	Raymond Wolf	4–5–1	0–3–1	12th			
1948	Raymond Wolf	5–5	1–5	T–10th			
1949	Raymond Wolf	4–5–1	1–4–1	T–10th			
Bob Woodruff (SEC) (1950–1959)
1950	Bob Woodruff	5–5	2–4	10th			
1951	Bob Woodruff	5–5	2–4	T–9th			
1952	Bob Woodruff	8–3	3–3	6th	W Gator		15
1953	Bob Woodruff	3–5–2	1–3–2	9th			
1954	Bob Woodruff	5–5	5–2	T–3rd			
1955	Bob Woodruff	4–6	3–5	10th			
1956	Bob Woodruff	6–3–1	5–2	3rd			
1957	Bob Woodruff	6–2–1	4–2–1	T–3rd			17
1958	Bob Woodruff	6–4–1	2–3–1	T–8th	L Gator	15	14
1959	Bob Woodruff	5–4–1	2–4	9th		19	19
Ray Graves (SEC) (1960–1969)
1960	Ray Graves	9–2	5–1	2nd	W Gator	16	18
1961	Ray Graves	4–5–1	3–3	6th			
1962	Ray Graves	7–4	4–2	5th	W Gator		
1963	Ray Graves	6–3–1	3–3–1	7th			
1964	Ray Graves	7–3	4–2	T–2nd			
1965	Ray Graves	7–4	4–2	3rd	L Sugar	12	
1966	Ray Graves	9–2	5–1	3rd	W Orange	11	
1967	Ray Graves	6–4	4–2	T–3rd			
1968	Ray Graves	6–3–1	3–2–1	T–6th			
1969	Ray Graves	9–1–1	3–1–1	4th	W Gator	17	14
Doug Dickey (SEC) (1970–1978)
1970	Doug Dickey	7–4	3–3	T–5th			
1971	Doug Dickey	4–7	1–6	T–8th			
1972	Doug Dickey	5–5–1	3–3–1	6th			
1973	Doug Dickey	7–5	3–4	T–5th	L Tangerine	19	
1974	Doug Dickey	8–4	3–3	T–4th	L Sugar	12	15
1975	Doug Dickey	9–3	5–1	T–2nd	L Gator		
1976	Doug Dickey	8–4	4–2	T–3rd	L Sun		
1977	Doug Dickey	6–4–1	3–3	5th			
1978	Doug Dickey	4–7	3–3	T–4th			
Charley Pell (SEC) (1979–1984)
1979	Charley Pell	0–10–1	0–6	T–9th			
1980	Charley Pell	8–4	4–2	T–4th	W Tangerine	19	
1981	Charley Pell	7–5	3–3	T–4th	L Peach		
1982	Charley Pell	8–4	3–3	T–6th	L Bluebonnet		
1983	Charley Pell	9–2–1	4–2	T–3rd	W Gator	6	6
1984	Charley Pell (Note: Pell was fired three games into the 1984 season. Assistant coach Galen Hall finished the season. Florida credits the first three games of the season to Pell and the final eight to Hall.)	9–1–1	5–0–1	1st (Note: Florida was assessed a postseason ban following an NCAA investigation, and the SEC subsequently vacated any championship. The Sugar Bowl automatic bid for the conference champion was awarded to LSU. Under modern rules, LSU would be credited with the conference championship.)	Ineligible	7	3
Galen Hall (SEC) (1985–1989)
1985	Galen Hall	9–1–1	5–1	T–1st (Note: Because of NCAA probation terms handed down the previous year, Hall's 1985 Florida Gators were ineligible to win the Southeastern Conference (SEC) title, receive a bowl bid, or appear on live television.)	Ineligible		5
1986	Galen Hall	6–5	2–4	T–7th			
1987	Galen Hall	6–6	3–3	6th	L Aloha		
1988	Galen Hall	7–5	4–3	T–4th	W All-American		
1989	Galen Hall (Note: The season was Galen Hall's sixth and final season as the head coach of the Florida Gators football team; Hall was replaced as the Gators head coach after five games by his defensive coordinator, Gary Darnell.)	7–5	4–3	T–4th	L Freedom		
Steve Spurrier (SEC) (1990–2001)
1990	Steve Spurrier	9–2	6–1	1st (Note: Florida was ineligible to win the SEC title or receive a bowl bid because of lingering NCAA probation.)	Ineligible		13
1991	Steve Spurrier	10–2	7–0	1st	L Sugar	8	7
1992	Steve Spurrier	9–4	6–2	T–1st (East)	W Gator	11	10
1993	Steve Spurrier	11–2	7–1	T–1st (East)	W Sugar	4	5
1994	Steve Spurrier	10–2–1	7–1	1st (East)	L Sugar	7	7
1995	Steve Spurrier	12–1	8–0	1st (East)	L Fiesta	3	2
1996	Steve Spurrier	12–1	8–0	1st (East)	W Sugar	1	1
1997	Steve Spurrier	10–2	6–2	T–2nd (East)	W Citrus	6	4
1998	Steve Spurrier	10–2	7–1	2nd (East)	W Orange^{†}	6	5
1999	Steve Spurrier	9–4	7–1	1st (East)	L Citrus	14	12
2000	Steve Spurrier	10–3	7–1	1st (East)	L Sugar^{†}	11	10
2001	Steve Spurrier	10–2	6–2	2nd (East)	W Orange^{†}	3	3
Ron Zook (SEC) (2002–2004)
2002	Ron Zook	8–5	6–2	2nd (East)	L Outback	24	
2003	Ron Zook	8–5	6–2	T–1st (East)	L Outback	25	24
2004	Ron Zook (Note: The season was the third and last for head coach Ron Zook, who led the Gators to a regular season record of 7–4. Interim head coach Charlie Strong led the team in the bowl game.)	7–5	4–4	T–3rd (East)	L Peach	25	
Urban Meyer (SEC) (2005–2010)
2005	Urban Meyer	9–3	5–3	T–2nd (East)	W Outback	16	12
2006	Urban Meyer	13–1	7–1	1st (East)	W BCS NCG^{†}	1	1
2007	Urban Meyer	9–4	5–3	3rd (East)	L Capital One	16	13
2008	Urban Meyer	13–1	7–1	1st (East)	W BCS NCG^{†}	1	1
2009	Urban Meyer	13–1	8–0	1st (East)	W Sugar^{†}	3	3
2010	Urban Meyer	8–5	4–4	2nd (East)	W Outback		
Will Muschamp (SEC) (2011–2014)
2011	Will Muschamp	7–6	3–5	3rd (East)	W Gator		
2012	Will Muschamp	11–2	7–1	T–1st (East)	L Sugar^{†}	10	9
2013	Will Muschamp	4–8	3–5	5th (East)			
2014	Will Muschamp (Note: On November 16, following an overtime home loss to South Carolina that eliminated the Gators from the SEC East race, Muschamp was informed that he would not return as Florida's head coach in 2015, but he agreed to coach the final two games of the regular season. Under interim coach D.J. Durkin, the Gators won the Birmingham Bowl.)	7–5	4–4	3rd (East)	W Birmingham		
Jim McElwain (SEC) (2015–2017)
2015	Jim McElwain	10–4	7–1	1st (East)	L Citrus	25	25
2016	Jim McElwain	9–4	6–2	1st (East)	W Outback	13	14
2017	Jim McElwain (Note: They were led by third-year head coach Jim McElwain until his dismissal on October 28, after which defensive coordinator Randy Shannon served as the interim head coach until the end of the season.)	4–7	3–5	5th (East)			
Dan Mullen (SEC) (2018–2021)
2018	Dan Mullen	10–3	5–3	T–2nd (East)	W Peach^{†}	6	7
2019	Dan Mullen	11–2	6–2	2nd (East)	W Orange^{†}	7	6
2020	Dan Mullen	8–4	8–2	1st (East)	L Cotton^{†}	12	13
2021	Dan Mullen (Note: Mullen was fired on November 21 and replaced by interim head coach Greg Knox, who coached the final regular season game and the bowl.)	6–7	2–6	6th (East)	L Gasparilla		
Billy Napier (SEC) (2022–2025)
2022	Billy Napier	6–7	3–5	T–4th (East)	L Las Vegas		
2023	Billy Napier	5–7	3–5	T–4th (East)			
2024	Billy Napier	8–5	4–4	10th	W Gasparilla		
2025	Billy Napier (Note: Napier was fired after seven games and replaced by interim head coach Billy Gonzales, who coached the remainder of the regular season games.)	4–8	2–6	12th			
Jon Sumrall (SEC) (2026–present)
2026	Jon Sumrall	6–4	4–4				
Total:		782–465–40					
National championship Conference title Conference division title or championship game berth
^{†}Indicates Bowl Coalition, Bowl Alliance, BCS, or CFP / New Years' Six bowl.; ^{#}Rankings from final Coaches Poll.

== See also ==
- Florida Gators
- History of the University of Florida
- List of Florida Gators head football coaches
- List of Florida Gators in the NFL draft
- University of Florida Athletic Hall of Fame
- University of Florida Athletic Association

== Bibliography ==
- 2011 Florida Gators Football Media Guide, University Athletic Association, Gainesville, Florida, pp. 120, 123–124 (2011).
- Carlson, Norm, University of Florida Football Vault: The History of the Florida Gators, Whitman Publishing, LLC, Atlanta, Georgia (2007). ISBN 0-7948-2298-3.
- Golenbock, Peter, Go Gators! An Oral History of Florida's Pursuit of Gridiron Glory, Legends Publishing, LLC, St. Petersburg, Florida (2002). ISBN 0-9650782-1-3.
- Hairston, Jack, Tales from the Gator Swamp: A Collection of the Greatest Gator Stories Ever Told, Sports Publishing, LLC, Champaign, Illinois (2002). ISBN 1-58261-514-4.
- Kabat, Ric A., "Before the Seminoles: Football at Florida State College, 1902–1904, Florida Historical Quarterly, vol. LXX, no. 1 (July 1991).
- McCarthy, Kevin M., Fightin' Gators: A History of University of Florida Football, Arcadia Publishing, Mount Pleasant, South Carolina (2000). ISBN 978-0-7385-0559-6.
- McEwen, Tom, The Gators: A Story of Florida Football, The Strode Publishers, Huntsville, Alabama (1974). ISBN 0-87397-025-X.
- Nash, Noel, ed., The Gainesville Sun Presents The Greatest Moments in Florida Gators Football, Sports Publishing, Inc., Champaign, Illinois (1998). ISBN 1-57167-196-X.
- Proctor, Samuel, & Wright Langley, Gator History: A Pictorial History of the University of Florida, South Star Publishing Company, Gainesville, Florida (1986). ISBN 0-938637-00-2.
