= 1969 Kentucky Wildcats football team =

American college football season

1969 Kentucky Wildcats football
- Conference: Southeastern Conference
- Record: 2–8 (1–6 SEC)
- Head coach: John Ray (1st season)
- Defensive coordinator: Dennis Fitzgerald (1st season)
- Home stadium: McLean Stadium

1969 Southeastern Conference football standings
	Conf.					Overall
Team	W		L		T	W		L		T
No. 15 Tennessee $	5	–	1	–	0	9	–	2	–	0
No. 10 LSU	4	–	1	–	0	9	–	1	–	0
No. 20 Auburn	5	–	2	–	0	8	–	3	–	0
No. 14 Florida	3	–	1	–	1	9	–	1	–	1
No. 8 Ole Miss	4	–	2	–	0	8	–	3	–	0
Georgia	2	–	3	–	1	5	–	5	–	1
Vanderbilt	2	–	3	–	0	4	–	6	–	0
Alabama	2	–	4	–	0	6	–	5	–	0
Kentucky	1	–	6	–	0	2	–	8	–	0
Mississippi State	0	–	5	–	0	3	–	7	–	0
$ – Conference champion; Rankings from AP Poll

The 1969 Kentucky Wildcats football team represented the University of Kentucky as a member of the Southeastern Conference (SEC) during the 1969 NCAA University Division football season. Led by first-year head coach John Ray, the Wildcats compiled an overall record of 2–8, with a mark of 1–6 in conference play, and finished ninth in the SEC.

== Schedule ==
Date	Opponent	Site	Result	Attendance	Source
September 20	No. 14 Indiana*	McLean Stadium; Lexington, KY (rivalry)	L 30–58	37,500–38,000	
September 27	No. 8 Ole Miss	McLean Stadium; Lexington, KY	W 10–9	37,500	
October 4	at Auburn	Cliff Hare Stadium; Auburn, AL	L 3–44	38,000	
October 11	at Virginia Tech*	Lane Stadium; Blacksburg, VA	W 7–6	33,000	
October 18	No. 9 LSU	McLean Stadium; Lexington, KY	L 10–37	37,500	
October 25	at No. 13 Georgia	Sanford Stadium; Athens, GA	L 0–30	55,781	
November 1	West Virginia*	McLean Stadium; Lexington, KY	L 6–7	37,500	
November 8	at Vanderbilt	Dudley Field; Nashville, TN (rivalry)	L 6–42	25,000	
November 15	at Florida	Florida Field; Gainesville, FL (rivalry)	L 6–31	55,279	
November 22	No. 9 Tennessee	McLean Stadium; Lexington, KY (rivalry)	L 26–31	36,500	
*Non-conference game; Rankings from AP Poll released prior to the game

== Roster ==
1969 Kentucky Wildcats football team roster
Players
Coaches
Offense

Pos.	#	Name	Class
[[American football positions|]]
[[American football positions|]]

Defense

Pos.	#	Name	Class
[[American football positions|]]

Special teams

Pos.	#	Name	Class

Head coach

- Charles (Charlie) Bradshaw

Coordinators/assistant coaches

Legend

- (C) Team captain
- (S) Suspended
- (I) Ineligible
- Injured
- Redshirt
