= 1969 Astro-Bluebonnet Bowl =

Auburn Tigers	Houston Cougars
(8–2)	(8–2)
7	36
Head coach: Ralph Jordan	Head coach: Bill Yeoman
AP / Coaches; 12 / 15	AP / Coaches; 17 / 16
	1	2	3	4	Total
Auburn	0	7	0	0	7
Houston	7	9	6	14	36
- Date: December 31, 1969
- Season: 1969
- Stadium: Astrodome
- Location: Houston, Texas
- MVP: HB Jim Strong (Houston)
- Referee: Percy Penn (SWC; split crew: SWC, SEC)
- Attendance: 55,203

United States TV coverage
- Network: HTN

The 1969 Astro-Bluebonnet Bowl was a college football bowl game that featured the Houston Cougars and the Auburn Tigers.

== Background ==
After two losses to Florida and Oklahoma State, the Cougars won eight straight games, including a perfect 5–0 record in the Astrodome, in their first bowl game since 1962. The Tigers finished third in the Southeastern Conference, after losses to #17 Tennessee and #9 LSU. This was their second straight bowl game.

== Game summary ==
Auburn's Terry Beasley fumbled the opening kickoff and Houston safety Nick Holm recovered to set up a Houston opportunity three minutes into the game. Quarterback Gary Mullins scored on a touchdown plunge to make it 7–0. After Auburn punted the ball, Houston drove 70 yards in 14 plays, culminating with a Carlos Lopez 27-yard field goal to make it 10–0 in the beginning of the second quarter. After another Auburn punt, the Cougars scored again, highlighted by a 74-yard run by Jim Strong on first-and-10 at Houston's 16 to the Auburn 10. He scored on a touchdown plunge soon after. Auburn’s Mickey Zofko completed a 36-yard halfback option pass to Connie Frederick to make it 16–7 with 3:36 in the half. An 8- play, 71-yard drive was culminated by a Ted Heiskell touchdown run to make it 22–7 in the third quarter. With 11:48 remaining in the game, Houston scored again on a 12 yard touchdown run by Strong. With :35 seconds left, Rusty Clark threw a touchdown pass to Tommy Mozisek to make the final score 36–7. Jim Strong rushed for 184 yards on 32 carries.

== Aftermath ==
Houston finished with a #12 ranking in the final AP Poll. The Cougars returned to the Astro-Bluebonnet Bowl two years later. The next bowl game for Auburn was the 1971 Gator Bowl, following the 1970 season.

== Statistics ==
Statistics	Houston	Auburn
First downs	25	14
Rushing yards	376	25
Passing yards	140	188
Interceptions thrown	2	2
Total offense	516	189
Fumbles–lost	2–1	1–1
Penalties–yards	6–63	4–26
Punts–average	2–42.5	6–39.8
