= List of Florida Gators head football coaches =

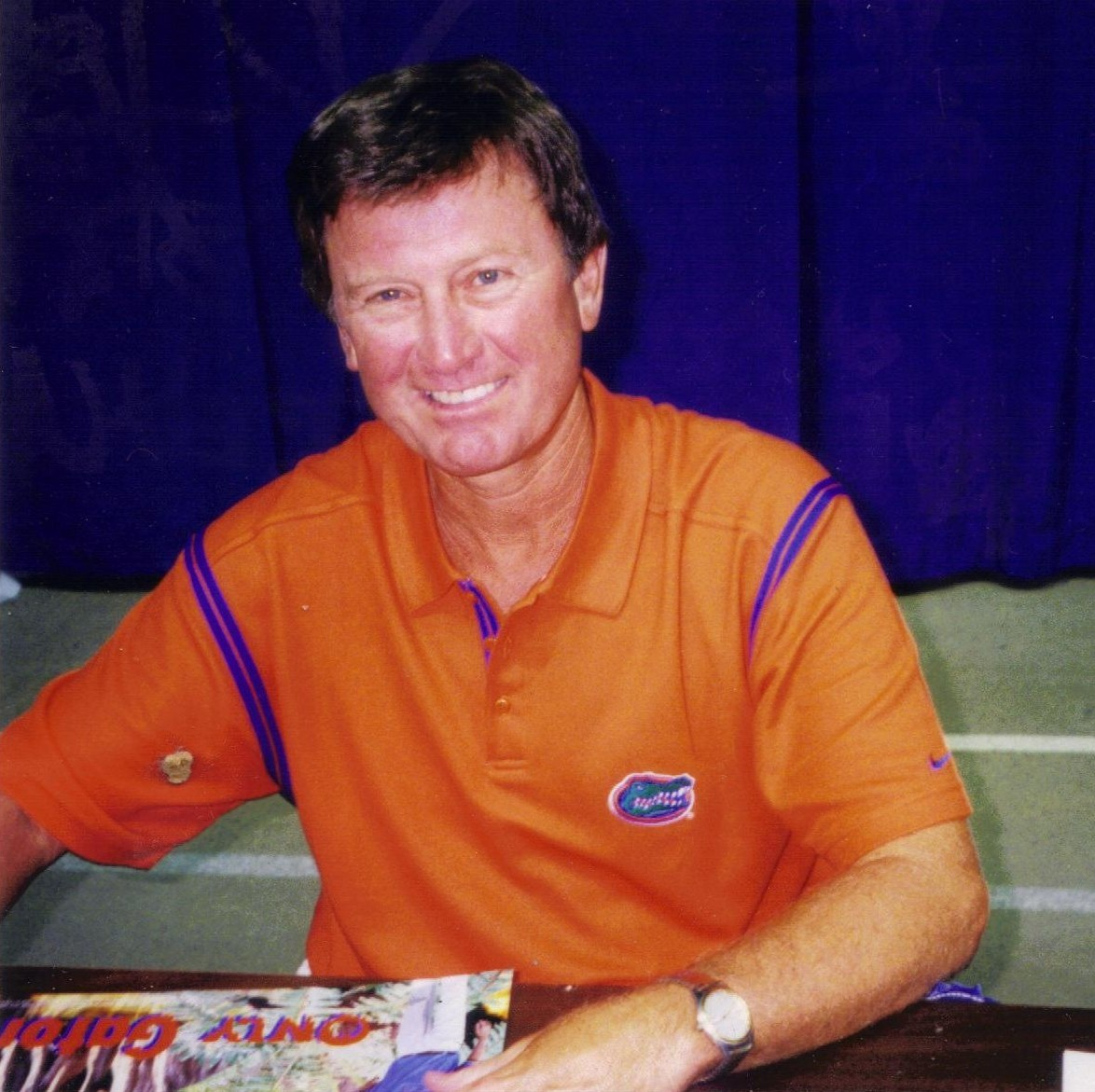
Steve Spurrier is Florida's coaching wins leader, with 122 victories from 1990 to 2001.

The Florida Gators football program is a college football team that represents the University of Florida in the sport of American football. The Florida Gators compete in the NCAA Division I Football Bowl Subdivision (FBS) of the National Collegiate Athletic Association (NCAA), and the Southeastern Conference (SEC). Twenty-nine men have served as the Gators' head coach since the university first fielded a team in 1906, including five who served as interim coach for a portion of a season. Of these, Charlie Bachman, Ray Graves, Doug Dickey, Steve Spurrier, and Urban Meyer have been inducted into the College Football Hall of Fame. Florida's head coach has been named as the SEC's coach of the year on eight occasions.

Two Gators coaches have led the team to SEC championships: Steve Spurrier won six conference titles while Urban Meyer won two. They also led the Gators to their three national championships; one under Spurrier (in 1996) and two under Meyer (2006 and 2008). Spurrier is Florida's all-time leader in seasons coached (12), conference wins (87), overall wins (122), and winning percentage for coaches serving for two or more seasons (.817).

Jon Sumrall was announced as Florida's new head coach after the conclusion of the 2025 season.

== Coaches ==
Records below accurate as of the end of the 2025 season.

List of head football coaches showing season(s) coached, overall records, conference records, postseason records, championships and selected awards
No.	Name	Term	GC	OW	OL	OT	O%	CW (Note: Florida began its football program as an independent, then joined the Southern Intercollegiate Athletic Association in 1912, moved to the Southern Conference in 1922, and has been a member of the Southeastern Conference since its founding in 1933.)	CL	CT	C%	PW	PL	PT	DC (Note: The SEC organized itself into two divisions upon expanding to 12 member schools in 1992, with the division winners facing off in the SEC Championship Game. Florida was placed in the SEC Eastern Division along with Georgia, Kentucky, South Carolina, Tennessee and Vanderbilt; Missouri was added when the conference expanded again in 2012. The SEC dropped the division format for football when the conference expanded to 16 member schools in 2024.)	CC	NC	Notes / awards
1	Jack Forsythe	1906–1908	22	14	6	2	0.682	—	—	—	—	—	—	—	—	—	0	—
2	George E. Pyle	1909–1913	36	26	7	3	0.764	3	5	0	0.375	1	0	0	—	0	0	—
3	C. J. McCoy	1914–1916	19	9	10	0	0.474	4	9	0	0.308	0	0	0	—	0	0	—
4	Alfred L. Buser	1917–1919	15	7	8	0	0.467	3	7	0	0.300	0	0	0	—	0	0	—
5	William G. Kline	1920–1922	29	19	8	2	0.690	7	4	2	0.615	0	0	0	—	0	0	—
6	James Van Fleet	1923–1924	19	12	3	4	0.737	3	0	3	0.750	0	0	0	—	0	0	—
7	Harold Sebring	1925–1927	30	17	11	2	0.600	9	7	1	0.559	0	0	0	—	0	0	—
8	Charlie Bachman^{†}	1928–1932	48	27	18	3	0.594	19	14	3	0.569	0	0	0	—	0	0	—
9	Dennis K. Stanley	1933–1935	29	14	13	2	0.517	5	11	1	0.324	0	0	0	—	0	0	—
10	Josh Cody	1936–1939	43	17	24	2	0.419	6	14	2	0.318	0	0	0	—	0	0	—
11	Tom Lieb	1940–1942; 1944–1945	47	20	26	1	0.436	5	15	1	0.262	0	0	0	—	0	0	—
12	Raymond Wolf	1946–1949	39	13	24	2	0.359	2	17	2	0.143	0	0	0	—	0	0	—
13	Bob Woodruff	1950–1959	101	53	42	6	0.554	29	32	4	0.477	1	1	0	—	0	0	—
14	Ray Graves^{†}	1960–1969	105	70	31	4	0.686	38	19	3	0.658	4	1	0	—	0	0	SEC Coach of the Year (1960)
15	Doug Dickey^{†}	1970–1978	103	58	43	2	0.573	28	28	1	0.500	0	4	0	—	0	0	—
16	Charley Pell	1979–1984	62	33	26	3	0.556	14	16	1	0.468	2	2	0	—	0	0	SEC Coach of the Year (1980)
17	Galen Hall	1984–1989	59	40	18	1	0.686	21	12	0	0.636	1	1	0	—	0	0	SEC Coach of the Year (1984)
18	Gary Darnell	1989	7	3	4	0	0.429	2	2	0	0.500	0	1	0	—	0	0	interim
19	Steve Spurrier^{†}	1990–2001	150	122	27	1	0.817	87	12	0	0.879	6	5	0	7	6	1 – 1996	SEC Coach of the Year (1990, 1995, 1996)
20	Ron Zook	2002–2004	37	23	14	—	0.622	16	8	—	0.667	0	2	—	1	0	0	—
21	Charlie Strong	2004	1	0	1	—	.000	0	0	—	.000	0	1	—	0	0	0	interim
22	Urban Meyer^{†}	2005–2010	80	65	15	—	0.813	36	13	—	0.735	5	1	—	3	2	2 – 2006, 2008	National Coach of the Decade (2009)
23	Will Muschamp	2011–2014	49	28	21	—	0.571	17	15	—	0.531	1	1	—	1	0	0	SEC Coach of the Year (2012)
24	D. J. Durkin	2014	1	1	0	—	1.000	0	0	—		0	0	—	0	0	0	interim
25	Jim McElwain	2015–2017	34	22	12	—	0.647	16	6	—	0.727	1	1	—	2	0	0	SEC Coach of the Year (2015)
26	Randy Shannon	2017	4	1	3	—	0.250	0	2	—	.000	0	0	—	0	0	0	interim
27	Dan Mullen	2018–2021	49	34	15	—	0.694	21	13	—	0.618	2	1	—	1	0	0	
28	Greg Knox	2021	2	1	1	—	0.500	0	0	—	–	0	1	—	0	0	0	interim
29	Billy Napier	2022–2025	45	22	23	—	0.489	12	16	—	.429	1	1	—	0	0	0	
30	Billy Gonzales	2025	5	1	4	—	0.200	0	4	—	.000	0	0	—	0	0	0	interim
31	Jon Sumrall	2026–present	8	5	3	—	0.625	3	3	—	0.500	0	0	—	0	0	0	

=== Key ===
Key to symbols in coaches list
General		Overall		Conference		Postseason (Note: Although the first Rose Bowl Game was played in 1902, it has been continuously played since the 1916 game, and is recognized as the oldest bowl game by the NCAA. "—" indicates any season prior to 1916 when postseason games were not played.)	
No.	Order of coaches (Note: A running total of the number of head coaches, with coaches who served separate tenures being counted only once. Interim head coaches are represented with "Int" and are not counted in the running total. "—" indicates the team played but either without a coach or no coach is on record. "X" indicates an interim year without play.)	GC	Games coached	CW	Conference wins	PW	Postseason wins
DC	Division championships	OW	Overall wins	CL	Conference losses	PL	Postseason losses
CC	Conference championships	OL	Overall losses	CT	Conference ties	PT	Postseason ties
NC	National championships	OT	Overall ties (Note: Overtime rules in college football were introduced in 1996, making ties impossible in the period since.)	C%	Conference winning percentage		
†	Elected to the College Football Hall of Fame	O%	Overall winning percentage (Note: When computing the win–loss percentage, a tie counts as half a win and half a loss.)				

== See also ==
- Florida Gators
- History of the University of Florida
- List of College Football Hall of Fame inductees (coaches)
- List of Florida Gators in the NFL draft
- List of Florida Gators football seasons
- University of Florida Athletic Hall of Fame
- University of Florida Athletic Association
