= 1969 Mississippi State Bulldogs football team =

American college football season

1969 Mississippi State Bulldogs football
- Conference: Southeastern Conference
- Record: 3–7 (0–5 SEC)
- Head coach: Charles Shira (3rd season)
- Home stadium: Scott Field; Mississippi Veterans Memorial Stadium

1969 Southeastern Conference football standings
	Conf.					Overall
Team	W		L		T	W		L		T
No. 15 Tennessee $	5	–	1	–	0	9	–	2	–	0
No. 10 LSU	4	–	1	–	0	9	–	1	–	0
No. 20 Auburn	5	–	2	–	0	8	–	3	–	0
No. 14 Florida	3	–	1	–	1	9	–	1	–	1
No. 8 Ole Miss	4	–	2	–	0	8	–	3	–	0
Georgia	2	–	3	–	1	5	–	5	–	1
Vanderbilt	2	–	3	–	0	4	–	6	–	0
Alabama	2	–	4	–	0	6	–	5	–	0
Kentucky	1	–	6	–	0	2	–	8	–	0
Mississippi State	0	–	5	–	0	3	–	7	–	0
$ – Conference champion; Rankings from AP Poll

The 1969 Mississippi State Bulldogs football team represented the Mississippi State University as a member of the Southeastern Conference (SEC) during the 1969 NCAA University Division football season. Led by third-year head coach Charles Shira, the Bulldogs compiled an overall record of 3–7, with a mark of 0–5 in conference play, and finished tenth in the SEC.

== Schedule ==
Date	Opponent	Site	Result	Attendance	Source
September 20	Richmond*	Scott Field; Starkville, MS	W 17–14	18,000	
September 27	No. 12 Florida	Mississippi Veterans Memorial Stadium; Jackson, MS	L 35–47	37,000	
October 4	at Houston*	Houston Astrodome; Houston, TX	L 0–74	36,207	
October 11	Southern Miss*	Scott Field; Starkville, MS	W 34–20	21,000	
October 18	at Texas Tech*	Jones Stadium; Lubbock, TX	W 30–26	34,000	
October 25	at Florida State*	Doak Campbell Stadium; Tallahassee, FL	L 17–20	33,301	
November 1	Alabama	Mississippi Veterans Memorial Stadium; Jackson, MS (rivalry)	L 19–23	41,000	
November 8	at No. 11 Auburn	Cliff Hare Stadium; Auburn, AL	L 13–52	47,600	
November 15	at No. 12 LSU	Tiger Stadium; Baton Rouge, LA (rivalry)	L 6–61	59,746	
November 27	No. 14 Ole Miss	Scott Field; Starkville, MS (Egg Bowl)	L 22–48	34,000	
*Non-conference game; Rankings from AP Poll released prior to the game
