= 1969 Vanderbilt Commodores football team =

American college football season

1969 Vanderbilt Commodores football
- Conference: Southeastern Conference
- Record: 4–6 (2–3 SEC)
- Head coach: Bill Pace (3rd season)
- Home stadium: Dudley Field

1969 Southeastern Conference football standings
	Conf.					Overall
Team	W		L		T	W		L		T
No. 15 Tennessee $	5	–	1	–	0	9	–	2	–	0
No. 10 LSU	4	–	1	–	0	9	–	1	–	0
No. 20 Auburn	5	–	2	–	0	8	–	3	–	0
No. 14 Florida	3	–	1	–	1	9	–	1	–	1
No. 8 Ole Miss	4	–	2	–	0	8	–	3	–	0
Georgia	2	–	3	–	1	5	–	5	–	1
Vanderbilt	2	–	3	–	0	4	–	6	–	0
Alabama	2	–	4	–	0	6	–	5	–	0
Kentucky	1	–	6	–	0	2	–	8	–	0
Mississippi State	0	–	5	–	0	3	–	7	–	0
$ – Conference champion; Rankings from AP Poll

The 1969 Vanderbilt Commodores football team represented Vanderbilt University in the 1969 NCAA University Division football season. The Commodores were led by head coach Bill Pace in his third season and finished the season with a record of four wins and six losses (4–6 overall, 2–3 in the SEC).

== Schedule ==
Date	Time	Opponent	Site	Result	Attendance	Source
September 20		at Michigan*	Michigan Stadium; Ann Arbor, MI	L 14–42	70,183	
September 27	7:30 p.m.	Army*	Dudley Field; Nashville, TN	L 6–16	27,708	
October 4		at North Carolina*	Kenan Memorial Stadium; Chapel Hill, NC	L 22–38	30,000	
October 11		No. 13 Alabama	Dudley Field; Nashville, TN	W 14–10	34,000	
October 18		No. 14 Georgia	Dudley Field; Nashville, TN (rivalry)	L 8–40	25,450	
October 25		at No. 10 Florida	Florida Field; Gainesville, FL	L 20–41	48,631	
November 1		at Tulane*	Tulane Stadium; New Orleans, LA	W 26–23	8,675	
November 8		Kentucky^{†}	Dudley Field; Nashville, TN (rivalry)	W 42–6	25,000	
November 22		Davidson*	Dudley Field; Nashville, TN	W 63–8	15,371	
November 29		at No. 10 Tennessee	Neyland Stadium; Knoxville, TN (rivalry)	L 27–40	60,672	
*Non-conference game; ^{†}Homecoming; Rankings from AP Poll released prior to the game; All times are in Central time
