= Mac Steen =

American football player and orthodontist (1948–2026)

No. 62
- Position: Tackle

Personal information
- Born: June 30, 1948; West Point, New York, U.S.
- Died: October 2, 2026 (aged 78)

Career information
- College: Florida (1967–1969)

Awards and highlights
- First-team All-SEC (1969)

Malcolm E. "Mac" Steen (June 30, 1948 – October 2, 2026) was an American college football player and orthodontist. Steen was a prominent tackle for coach Ray Graves' Florida Gators of the University of Florida from 1967 to 1969. Graves rated Steen as the Gators best right tackle of the 1960s. He was the senior team captain in 1969.

Steen died on October 2, 2026, at the age of 78.

== See also ==
- List of University of Florida Athletic Hall of Fame members
