= Carlos Alvarez (American football) =

Consensus All-American wide receiver (born 1950)

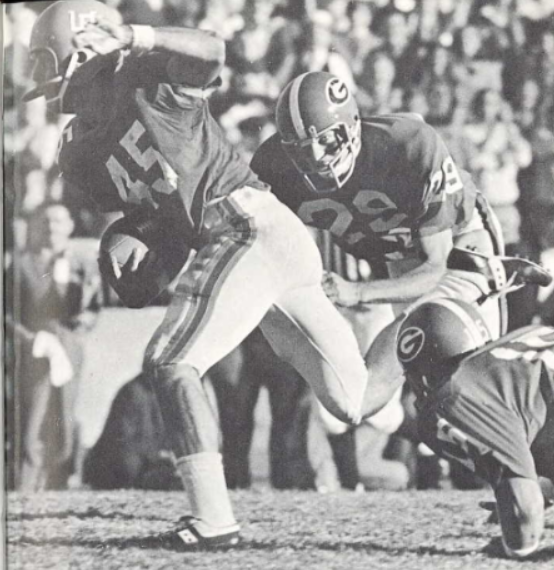
- Alvarez vs. Georgia in 1970

No. 45
- Position: Wide receiver

Personal information
- Born: May 1, 1950 (age 76); Havana, Cuba
- Listed height: 5 ft 11 in (1.80 m)
- Listed weight: 185 lb (84 kg)

Career information
- High school: North Miami Senior (North Miami, Florida, U.S.)
- College: Florida (1969–1971)

Awards and highlights
- Consensus All-American (1969); First-team All-SEC (1969); Second-team All-SEC (1971); First-team Academic All-American (1969); 2× Second-team Academic All-American (1970, 1971); Florida career receiving yardage leader (2,563); Florida–Georgia Hall of Fame; University of Florida Athletic Hall of Fame; Florida Gators All-Century Team; Academic All-American Hall of Fame
- College Football Hall of Fame

Carlos Alvarez Vazquez Rodriguez Ubieta (born April 1, 1950) is a former American football college player who was a consensus All-American wide receiver for the Florida Gators football team of the University of Florida from 1969 to 1971.

== Early life ==
Alvarez was born in Cuba in 1950, the youngest of Licinio and Isola Alvarez's three sons. Alvarez's father Licinio had been a successful lawyer in Cuba, but his parents fled to the United States to escape Fidel Castro's communist revolution in 1960, when Alvarez was a 10-year-old boy.

He was raised in Miami, Florida and attended North Miami Senior High School in North Miami, Florida, where he was an all-county high school football player for the North Miami Pioneers. Alvarez was the Pioneers' star halfback who could run and catch, and was touted by the local newspapers as the best back in Dade County—on offense and defense. On at least two occasions, he played all forty-eight minutes of a high school game, playing on both offense and defense.

He was highly recruited by multiple universities, including the hometown University of Miami and the University of Florida, but he ultimately chose Florida where his older brothers Arturo and Cesar were already enrolled. It was reported that his brother Arturo was the best athlete in the family and could cover Carlos one-on-one. Alvarez graduated from North Miami High School in 1968.

== College career ==
After graduating from high school, Alvarez accepted an athletic scholarship to attend the University of Florida in Gainesville, Florida, and played for coach Ray Graves and coach Doug Dickey's Florida Gators football teams from 1969 to 1971. During Graves' final season as Florida's head coach in 1969, Alvarez was one of several talented second-year Gators known as the "Super Sophs" who led the team to its then all-time best record of 9–1–1. At the close of his sophomore season, he was honored as a first-team All-Southeastern Conference (SEC) selection and a consensus first-team All-American, and he caught a nine-yard touchdown pass to provide the Gators' margin of victory in their 14–13 upset of the Tennessee Volunteers in the 1969 Gator Bowl.

Alvarez was known for his speed on the football field, and the media dubbed him the "Cuban Comet." He was also the Gators' leading receiver in 1970 and 1971, marking three straight seasons as the Gators' top offensive weapon. Alvarez was also a first-team Academic All-American in 1969 and a second-team Academic All-American in 1970 and 1971, and was chosen for the Academic All-American Hall of Fame in 1991.

In the last game of that 1969 season against the University of Miami he heard a popping sound in his right knee, which would be the start of a series of injuries. In 1970, he was limited with a balky right knee that tended to swell at the slightest irritation and was thought of having an arthritic condition. He was able to come back in 1971, but played sparingly, although against the University of Maryland, he had 10 receptions for 134 yards, including a spectacular 16-yard touchdown, helping the Gators win 27–23. In 1972, he did graduate work in law. On January 9, he saw part-time action in the American Bowl. Two days later, he had surgery on his left knee (which he had previously injured as a junior in high school). Three days later, the apartment he shared with his brother was destroyed by fire.

=== Florida Gators receiving records ===
Although Florida has fielded many prolific offenses including 17 All-American receivers and three Heisman Trophy-winning quarterbacks since Carlos Alvarez last played in 1971, he is still the Gators' record holder for pass receptions in a single game (15), in a single season (88), and career receiving yards (2,563)/ At the end of his three-year college career, Alvarez held many Gator and SEC pass receiving records, including career, season and game pass receptions and yardage records.

The only SEC player in the last 50 years to hold at time of graduation all but one SEC career, season, and game record. Only record not held was career receiving touchdowns – held by College Football Hall of Famer Terry Beasley, Auburn. Only Gator receiver in the last 50 years to hold all Gator career, season and game pass receiving records at time of graduation. Alvarez still holds some individual game, season and career records and is in the top five of almost all other Gator receiving categories. The 88 catches in 1969 had been exceeded up to that season by only three players in the history of college football (Howard Twilley -Tulsa, Glen Meltzer – Wichita State, Jerry Hendren – Idaho). The 88 catches and 1329 yards in his sophomore season remain 50 years later the highest numbers by any sophomore player in SEC history. This was done in a 10-game season. Was in the top 5 in the SEC for season receiving yards in 1969 (1), 1970 (5) and 1971 (4) despite severe knee injuries in 70 and 71 and a coaching change that led to a more run oriented offense. At the time in 1969, first consensus All-American sophomore since Heisman Trophy winner Doak Walker (SMU) in 1947. One of only two Gator players (Danny Wurfell is the other) to be inducted into the College Football Hall of Fame and the Academic All-American Hall of Fame. The Gators have produced 17 All-Americans at the wide receiver position and two Heisman Trophy winning quarterbacks (Steve Spurrier played before Alvarez) since Alvarez’ graduation in 1972.

His career record of 176 receptions was broken by Andre Caldwell in 2007, and he ranks second in Gator history (and third in SEC history) in receiving yards in a single season (1,329 yards in 1969) and second on the receiving yards charts in a single game (237 against Miami in 1969). He ranks ninth among all-time Gators receivers in career touchdown receptions (26), seventh in touchdown receptions in a single season (18), and is tied for third for most touchdown receptions in a single game (3). His 133 yards per-game average in 1969 is still the all-time single-season best among Gators, and has only been exceeded once in the SEC.

Alvarez ranks second among Gators receivers with thirteen games for 100 yards or more receiving, one behind career leader Jabar Gaffney. He ranks first among Gators for most 100-yard receiving games in a season, also tied with Gaffney and Travis McGriff, all with eight. Alvarez achieved this in 1969 when six of those 100-yard games were achieved consecutively—also a team record he shares with two other Gators.

== Life after football ==
Alvarez graduated from the University of Florida with a bachelor's degree in political science, with honors, in 1972. The Dallas Cowboys selected him in the fifteenth round (390th overall pick) of the 1972 NFL draft, hoping he could return to health, but he did not sign a contract because of his chronic knee injuries. He received an NCAA Post-Graduate Scholarship Award to attend the Duke University School of Law in Durham, North Carolina, and earned his juris doctor (J.D.) degree summa cum laude in 1975. After graduation, he worked as a law professor at the Southern Methodist University School of Law in Dallas, Texas, where he was named the Outstanding Law Professor in 1980.

Following in the family legal tradition of his father and older brothers, Alvarez became a practicing attorney. He is a member of The Florida Bar, and has been admitted to practice before the U.S. District Court for the Northern District of Florida, the U.S. Court of Appeals for the Eleventh Circuit, and the U.S. Court of Claims. He has served on the Florida Elections Commission and Second Judicial Circuit Nominating Commission, and was awarded the Jose Marti Award for Outstanding Achievement in the Cuban Community from the U.S. Department of Health, Education and Welfare. Alvarez is an environmental and land use attorney based in Tallahassee, Florida, but his current practice emphasizes mediation, arbitration and alternative dispute resolution.

Alvarez was inducted into the University of Florida Athletic Hall of Fame as a "Gator Great" in 1986, and elected to the College Football Hall of Fame in 2011. In one of a series of articles written in 2006, The Gainesville Sun recognized him as No. 7 among the top 100 all-time Gators football players from the first 100 years of the team.

In October 2020, the ESPN SEC Storied series broadcast a documentary on Carlos Alvarez titled, "The All-American Cuban Comet". It was directed and produced by Gaspar Gonzalez. It covers approximately the first 22 years of Alvarez' life and his desire to become an American citizen after leaving Cuba at the age of 10 and how football became part of that struggle. It includes a perspective of that struggle during the socially turbulent times of the 60's and Alvarez' political activism during that time.

== See also ==
- 1969 College Football All-America Team
- Florida Gators football, 1960–69
- Florida Gators football, 1970–79
- List of College Football Hall of Fame inductees (players, A–K)
- List of College Football Hall of Fame inductees (players, L–Z)
- List of Duke University alumni
- List of Florida Gators football All-Americans
- List of University of Florida alumni
- List of University of Florida Athletic Hall of Fame members
