= 1969 Ole Miss Rebels football team =

American college football season

1969 Ole Miss Rebels football

Sugar Bowl champion

Sugar Bowl, W 27–22 vs. Arkansas
- Conference: Southeastern Conference

Ranking
- Coaches: No. 13
- AP: No. 8
- Record: 8–3 (4–2 SEC)
- Head coach: Johnny Vaught (23rd season)
- Home stadium: Hemingway Stadium; Mississippi Veterans Memorial Stadium

1969 Southeastern Conference football standings
	Conf.					Overall
Team	W		L		T	W		L		T
No. 15 Tennessee $	5	–	1	–	0	9	–	2	–	0
No. 10 LSU	4	–	1	–	0	9	–	1	–	0
No. 20 Auburn	5	–	2	–	0	8	–	3	–	0
No. 14 Florida	3	–	1	–	1	9	–	1	–	1
No. 8 Ole Miss	4	–	2	–	0	8	–	3	–	0
Georgia	2	–	3	–	1	5	–	5	–	1
Vanderbilt	2	–	3	–	0	4	–	6	–	0
Alabama	2	–	4	–	0	6	–	5	–	0
Kentucky	1	–	6	–	0	2	–	8	–	0
Mississippi State	0	–	5	–	0	3	–	7	–	0
$ – Conference champion; Rankings from AP Poll

The 1969 Ole Miss Rebels football team represented the University of Mississippi during the 1969 NCAA University Division football season. The Rebels were led by 23rd-year head coach Johnny Vaught and played their home games at Hemingway Stadium in Oxford, Mississippi and Mississippi Veterans Memorial Stadium in Jackson. The team competed as members of the Southeastern Conference, finishing in fifth. Ole Miss ended the year with five straight victories, including three over top ten-ranked opponents. In their 13th straight bowl appearance, Ole Miss defeated then-No. 3 Arkansas in the 1970 Sugar Bowl. They were ranked 8th in the final AP Poll, conducted after bowl season, and 13th in the Coaches Poll, which was conducted before bowl season.

== Schedule ==
Date	Opponent	Rank	Site	Result	Attendance	Source
September 20	Memphis State*	No. 9	Hemingway Stadium; Oxford, MS (rivalry)	W 28–3	34,876	
September 27	at Kentucky	No. 8	McLean Stadium; Lexington, KY	L 9–10	37,500	
October 4	at No. 15 Alabama	No. 20	Legion Field; Birmingham, AL (rivalry)	L 32–33	62,858	
October 11	No. 6 Georgia		Mississippi Veterans Memorial Stadium; Jackson, MS	W 25–17	42,581	
October 18	Southern Miss*	No. 19	Hemingway Stadium; Oxford, MS	W 69–7	25,283	
October 25	at Houston*	No. 17	Houston Astrodome; Houston, TX	L 11–25	48,049	
November 1	No. 8 LSU		Mississippi Veterans Memorial Stadium; Jackson, MS (rivalry)	W 26–23	46,332	
November 8	Chattanooga*	No. 17	Hemingway Stadium; Oxford, MS	W 21–0	15,200	
November 15	No. 3 Tennessee	No. 18	Mississippi Veterans Memorial Stadium; Jackson, MS (rivalry)	W 38–0	47,220	
November 27	at Mississippi State	No. 14	Scott Field; Starkville, MS (Egg Bowl)	W 48–22	34,000	
January 1	vs. No. 3 Arkansas*	No. 13	Tulane Stadium; New Orleans, LA (Sugar Bowl, rivalry)	W 27–22	82,500	
*Non-conference game; Rankings from AP Poll released prior to the game

== Roster ==
1969 Ole Miss Rebels football team roster
Players
Coaches
Offense

Pos.	#	Name	Class
		Floyd Franks
QB	18	Archie Manning	Jr
TE		Jim Poole Jr.	So
WR	81	Vernon Studdard	Jr

Defense

Pos.	#	Name	Class

Special teams

Pos.	#	Name	Class
P	18	Julian Fagan	Jr

Head coach

- Johnny Vaught

Coordinators/assistant coaches

Legend

- (C) Team captain
- (S) Suspended
- (I) Ineligible
- Injured
- Redshirt
