= 1969 LSU Tigers football team =

American college football season

1969 LSU Tigers football
- Conference: Southeastern Conference

Ranking
- Coaches: No. 7
- AP: No. 10
- Record: 9–1 (4–1 SEC)
- Head coach: Charles McClendon (8th season)
- Home stadium: Tiger Stadium

1969 Southeastern Conference football standings
| | Conf. | | | | | Overall |
| Team | W | | L | | T | W | | L | | T |
|---|---|---|---|---|---|---|---|---|---|---|
| No. 15 Tennessee $ | 5 | – | 1 | – | 0 | 9 | – | 2 | – | 0 |
| No. 10 LSU | 4 | – | 1 | – | 0 | 9 | – | 1 | – | 0 |
| No. 20 Auburn | 5 | – | 2 | – | 0 | 8 | – | 3 | – | 0 |
| No. 14 Florida | 3 | – | 1 | – | 1 | 9 | – | 1 | – | 1 |
| No. 8 Ole Miss | 4 | – | 2 | – | 0 | 8 | – | 3 | – | 0 |
| Georgia | 2 | – | 3 | – | 1 | 5 | – | 5 | – | 1 |
| Vanderbilt | 2 | – | 3 | – | 0 | 4 | – | 6 | – | 0 |
| Alabama | 2 | – | 4 | – | 0 | 6 | – | 5 | – | 0 |
| Kentucky | 1 | – | 6 | – | 0 | 2 | – | 8 | – | 0 |
| Mississippi State | 0 | – | 5 | – | 0 | 3 | – | 7 | – | 0 |
$ – Conference champion; Rankings from AP Poll

The 1969 LSU Tigers football team represented Louisiana State University during the 1969 NCAA University Division football season. Despite a 9–1 record, Tigers did not participate in a bowl game after they were shut out of the Cotton Bowl and Sugar Bowl, and refusing overtures from the Bluebonnet, Gator and Peach bowls.

LSU hoped to appear in the Cotton Bowl, because the winner of the Texas-Arkansas game would be ranked no lower than No. 3 in the Associated Press poll, and quite possibly No. 1. However, when Notre Dame voted to participate in bowl games for the first time since 1924, the Cotton snapped up the Irish. The Sugar Bowl, peeved by a perceived snub from a school just 80 miles away, instead chose Ole Miss, which, despite beating LSU 26–23, was only 7–3, with losses to Kentucky and Alabama, two teams LSU defeated.

As it turned out, Texas ascended to No. 1 after Ohio State lost 24–12 at Michigan. The Longhorns kept their top ranking by defeating archrivals Texas A&M 49-12 and Arkansas 15–14, then knocking off Notre Dame 21–17 in the Cotton Bowl.

LSU's 20–15 victory over Alabama was its last home win over the Crimson Tide until 2000.

== Schedule ==
| Date | Time | Opponent | Rank | Site | Result | Attendance | Source |
|---|---|---|---|---|---|---|---|
| September 20 | | Texas A&M* | | Tiger Stadium; Baton Rouge, LA (rivalry) | W 35–6 | 67,501 | |
| September 27 | | at Rice* | | Rice Stadium; Houston, TX | W 42–0 | 55,000 | |
| October 4 | | Baylor* | No. 16 | Tiger Stadium; Baton Rouge, LA | W 63–8 | 65,000 | |
| October 10 | 7:15 p.m. | at Miami (FL)* | No. 14 | Miami Orange Bowl; Miami, FL | W 20–0 | 41,972 | |
| October 18 | | at Kentucky | No. 9 | McLean Stadium; Lexington, KY | W 37–10 | 37,500 | |
| October 25 | | No. 14 Auburn^{†} | No. 9 | Tiger Stadium; Baton Rouge, LA (rivalry) | W 21–20 | 65,000 | |
| November 1 | | at Ole Miss | No. 8 | Mississippi Veterans Memorial Stadium; Jackson, MS (rivalry) | L 23–26 | 46,332 | |
| November 8 | | Alabama | No. 12 | Tiger Stadium; Baton Rouge, LA (rivalry) | W 20–15 | 67,590 | |
| November 15 | | Mississippi State | No. 12 | Tiger Stadium; Baton Rouge, LA (rivalry) | W 61–6 | 59,746 | |
| November 22 | | Tulane* | No. 10 | Tiger Stadium; Baton Rouge, LA (Battle for the Rag) | W 27–0 | 67,000 | |
*Non-conference game; ^{†}Homecoming; Rankings from AP Poll released prior to the game; All times are in Central time

== Roster ==
1969 LSU Tigers football team roster
Players
Coaches
Offense

| Pos. | # | Name | Class |
|---|---|---|---|
| WR | 80 | Andy Hamilton | So |
| QB | 13 | Mike Hillman | Sr |
| QB | 18 | Buddy Lee | Jr |
| HB | 33 | Eddie Ray | Sr |
| C | 51 | Godfrey Zaunbrecher | Sr |

Defense

| Pos. | # | Name | Class |
|---|---|---|---|
| LB | 45 | Mike Anderson | Jr |
| LB | 42 | George Bevan | Sr |
| DB | 37 | Tommy Casanova | So |
| DT | 78 | Ron Estay | So |
| DT | 73 | John Sage | Jr |

Special teams

| Pos. | # | Name | Class |
|---|---|---|---|
| K | 36 | Steve Cornfield | Sr |

Head coach

- Charles McClendon

Coordinators/assistant coaches

Legend

- (C) Team captain
- (S) Suspended
- (I) Ineligible
- Injured
- Redshirt

Roster

== Team players drafted into the NFL ==
| Player | Position | Round | Pick | NFL team |
|---|---|---|---|---|
| Eddie Ray | Running Back | 4 | 83 | Boston Patriots |
| Godfrey Zaunbrecher | Center | 11 | 286 | Minnesota Vikings |
| George Bevan | Defensive Back | 17 | 421 | Buffalo Bills |
