= 1969 Alabama Crimson Tide football team =

American college football season

1969 Alabama Crimson Tide football

Liberty Bowl, L 33–47 vs. Colorado
- Conference: Southeastern Conference
- Record: 6–5 (2–4 SEC)
- Head coach: Bear Bryant (12th season)
- Captains: Danny Ford; Alvin Samples
- Home stadium: Denny Stadium; Legion Field

1969 Southeastern Conference football standings
	Conf.					Overall
Team	W		L		T	W		L		T
No. 15 Tennessee $	5	–	1	–	0	9	–	2	–	0
No. 10 LSU	4	–	1	–	0	9	–	1	–	0
No. 20 Auburn	5	–	2	–	0	8	–	3	–	0
No. 14 Florida	3	–	1	–	1	9	–	1	–	1
No. 8 Ole Miss	4	–	2	–	0	8	–	3	–	0
Georgia	2	–	3	–	1	5	–	5	–	1
Vanderbilt	2	–	3	–	0	4	–	6	–	0
Alabama	2	–	4	–	0	6	–	5	–	0
Kentucky	1	–	6	–	0	2	–	8	–	0
Mississippi State	0	–	5	–	0	3	–	7	–	0
$ – Conference champion; Rankings from AP Poll

The 1969 Alabama Crimson Tide football team (variously "Alabama", "UA" or "Bama") represented the University of Alabama in the 1969 NCAA University Division football season. It was the Crimson Tide's 75th overall and 36th season as a member of the Southeastern Conference (SEC). The team was led by head coach Bear Bryant, in his 12th year, and played their home games at Denny Stadium in Tuscaloosa and Legion Field in Birmingham, Alabama. They finished season with six wins and five losses (6–5 overall, 2–4 in the SEC) and with a loss against Colorado in the Liberty Bowl.

Alabama opened the season ranked No. 13 and defeated Virginia Tech at Blacksburg and Southern Miss in the first regular season game played at Denny Stadium on AstroTurf. In their third game, the Crimson Tide defeated an Archie Manning led Ole Miss squad 33–32 in a record-breaking game before a nationally televised audience. Alabama then lost consecutive games for the first time during Bryant's tenure as head coach against Vanderbilt and Tennessee.

After their loss to Tennessee, Alabama rebounded with victories at Clemson and at Mississippi State before they lost their third game of the season at LSU. They rebounded the next week with a homecoming victory over Miami but then lost to Auburn in the Iron Bowl. In the December that followed, Alabama lost 47–33 to Colorado in the Liberty Bowl.

The 1969 season marked the 100th anniversary of the start of college football, and as such Alabama commemorated the event by altering their helmet design. Instead of the player number, the helmet for the 1969 season featured the number "100" inside a football to commemorate the anniversary of the first college football game.

== Schedule ==
Date	Opponent	Rank	Site	TV	Result	Attendance
September 20	at Virginia Tech*	No. 13	Lane Stadium; Blacksburg, VA		W 17–13	42,000
September 27	Southern Miss*	No. 15	Denny Stadium; Tuscaloosa, AL		W 63–14	50,035
October 4	No. 20 Ole Miss	No. 15	Legion Field; Birmingham, AL (rivalry)	ABC	W 33–32	62,858
October 11	at Vanderbilt	No. 13	Dudley Field; Nashville, TN		L 10–14	34,000
October 18	No. 7 Tennessee	No. 20	Legion Field; Birmingham, AL (Third Saturday in October)		L 14–41	72,443
October 25	at Clemson*		Memorial Stadium; Clemson, SC (rivalry)		W 38–13	41,384
November 1	at Mississippi State		Mississippi Veterans Memorial Stadium; Jackson, MS (rivalry)		W 23–19	36,517
November 8	at No. 12 LSU		Tiger Stadium; Baton Rouge, LA (rivalry)		L 15–20	67,590
November 15	Miami (FL)*^{†}		Denny Stadium; Tuscaloosa, AL		W 42–6	57,596
November 29	vs. No. 12 Auburn		Legion Field; Birmingham, AL (Iron Bowl)		L 26–49	72,303
December 13	vs. Colorado*		Memphis Memorial Stadium; Memphis, TN (Liberty Bowl)	ABC	L 33–47	50,144
*Non-conference game; ^{†}Homecoming; Rankings from AP Poll released prior to the game

== Game summaries ==
=== Virginia Tech ===
Team	1	2	3	4	Total
• #13 Alabama	3	7	7	0	17
Virginia Tech	3	7	0	3	13

- Date: September 20
- Location: Lane Stadium
  Blacksburg, VA
- Game attendance: 42,000

To open the 1968 season, Alabama defeated the Virginia Tech (also then known as VPI) Gobblers 17–13 at Lane Stadium in a back-and-forth game between the teams. After Virginia Tech took an early 3–0 lead on a 19-yard Jack Simcsak field goal, Alabama responded later in the first with a 40-yard Richard Ciemny field goal that tied the game 3–3. Alabama then took a 10–3 lead on a one-yard Johnny Musso touchdown run in the second quarter. The Hokies were then able to tie the game 10–10 at halftime with a five-yard Al Kincaid touchdown run.

In the third quarter, George Ranager scored what was the game-winning touchdown on a 10-yard run and a 45-yard Simcsak field goal in the fourth provided for the final margin in the 17–13 Crimson Tide victory. The 42,000 in attendance was the largest crowd to date to witness a football game in the commonwealth of Virginia and required the addition of 7,000 temporary seats to accommodate demand.

=== Southern Miss ===
Team	1	2	3	4	Total
Southern Miss	0	7	7	0	14
• #15 Alabama	9	26	14	14	63

- Date: September 27
- Location: Denny Stadium
  Tuscaloosa, AL
- Game attendance: 50,035

After their close victory over Virginia Tech, Alabama dropped into the No. 15 position in the AP Poll prior to their game against Southern Miss. In their home opener, Alabama defeated the Southerners 63–14 behind a ten-point rally in the fourth quarter. Alabama took a 9–0 first quarter lead on a five-yard Scott Hunter touchdown pass to Pete Jilleba and a 25-yard Richard Ciemny field goal. After Frank Johnston cut the Crimson Tide lead to 9–7 with his one-yard touchdown run, Alabama scored 26 second quarter points that extended their lead to 35–7 at halftime. The four second-quarter touchdowns were scored on runs of 11-yards by George Ranager, one-yard by Hunter, six-yards by Johnny Musso and nine-yards by Bubba Sawyer.

Alabama opened the third quarter with a two-yard Musso touchdown run, and then Southern scored their other touchdown on a six-yard Danny Palmer pass to Billy Mikel that made the score 42–14. The Crimson Tide then closed the game with a pair of Neb Hayden touchdown runs from one and four-yards and by Benny Rippetoe on a four-yard run that made the final score 63–14. The game was the first played on an AstroTurf surface between Denny Field opponents as it was installed during the previous spring.

=== Ole Miss ===
Team	1	2	3	4	Total
#20 Ole Miss	7	0	13	12	32
• #15 Alabama	7	7	7	12	33

- Date: October 4
- Location: Legion Field
  Birmingham, AL
- Game attendance: 62,858
- TV announcers (ABC): Chris Schenkel (play-by-play), Bud Wilkinson (color)

After their blowout victory over Southern Miss, Alabama retained their No. 15 position in the AP Poll prior to their game at Ole Miss. Before a nationally televised, prime time audience, Alabama defeated the Rebels 33–32 in an offensive shootout that saw the offenses combined to set one NCAA and nine SEC records. After the teams traded first-quarter touchdown runs of one-yard by Johnny Musso and two-yards by Archie Manning, Alabama took a 14–7 halftime lead on a 17-yard Bubba Sawyer touchdown run.

At the end of the third quarter, Alabama retained a 21–20 lead after the teams again traded touchdowns. The Rebels scored first on an 11-yard Manning pass to Floyd Franks, followed by a one-yard Musso run and a 17-yard Manning run. Both teams then traded fourth-quarter touchdowns with the Crimson Tide coming out on top 33–32. Ole Miss touchdowns were scored on a two-yard Manning pass to Riley Myers and a one-yard Manning run, and Alabama touchdowns were scored on a one-yard Scott Hunter run and 14-yard Hunter pass to George Ranager.

Records set in this game included a new national record for passes completed between both teams with 55. Conference records set in the game by Rebels quarterback Archie Manning included most passing yards, attempts and completions in a single game by going 33 of 52 for 436 yards in addition to most total offense by a single player with 540 yards.

=== Vanderbilt ===
Team	1	2	3	4	Total
#13 Alabama	3	0	7	0	10
• Vanderbilt	0	7	0	7	14

- Date: October 11
- Location: Dudley Field
  Nashville, TN
- Game attendance: 34,000

After their victory over the Rebels, Alabama moved into the No. 13 position of the AP Poll prior to their game against Vanderbilt. At Nashville the Commodores upset Alabama 14–10 and ended a nine-game losing streak against the Crimson Tide. After Alabama took a 3–0 first quarter lead on a 19-yard Mike Dean field goal, Vanderbilt responded in the second quarter with an unexpected halfback pass by Doug Mathews from six yards out, to wingback David Strong, who was standing all alone in the end zone, giving them the halftime lead 7–3.

Vanderbilt opened the second half with possession of the football. Mathews fumbled the ball and Alabama's defensive end, Wayne Rhodes made the recovery at the Vanderbilt 19-yard line. On the first play, George Ranger swept around the right end for a Crimson Tide touchdown. With just 1:35 elapsed in the third quarter, Dean's conversion gave Alabama a 10-7 margin. In the third quarter, Vanderbilt, chewed up the clock, combining on short passes and running the ball, cutting nine minutes off the clock in a 25-play drive. With the ball on the 1-yard line, the Commodores failed to get the ball into the end zone. Vanderbilt's field goal attempt, sailed to the left of the uprights. The Commodores defense, led by Pat Toomay, put pressure on Alabama throughout the game. Vanderbilt began its march to the winning touchdown with 7:30 left in the game. Denny Painter began the drive at quarterback for Vanderbilt and hit Curt Chesley on passes of 18, 6, and 17 yards to get the drive rolling, then a key pass to David Strong of 19 yards extended the drive. Watson Brown, who turned down a scholarship from Bryant, came into the game for Painter in a first-down situation at the Tide's 21-yard line. On Brown's first play, he handed off to Mathews who bulled his way for 11 yards down to the 10, but on the next play, Daniel Lipperman failed to gain a yard on a running play, setting up a second-and-long situation. Brown turned to his right, faked a hand-off, quickly turned and threw a strike to tight end Jim Cunningham. Cunningham, stayed on the line of scrimmage, caught the ball and ran into the end zone. Pandemonium broke out in the stands as the crowd reacted to the dramatic finish. The conversion was successful and Vanderbilt took the lead, 14–10.

However, there were still two minutes on the clock, plenty of time for gunslinger Scott Hunter (American football) to move the ball into scoring range. Vandys' defense forced Alabama into a fourth down situation on its own 21-yard line. On Alabama's final desperation pass attempt, Commodore defender Les Lyle broke through the line and slammed Hunter to the ground for a sack. Vanderbilt fans believed the game over, yet a flag was thrown on Lyle for being offsides. Alabama still needed two more yards for a first down, since the offsides penalty did not give Alabama the much-needed first down. The next play, defensive tackle, Buzz Hamilton exploded through the line hitting Hunter and forcing him to throw an underhanded pass that landed untouched on the ground. Vanderbilt won the game, 14–10. This would be Vanderbilt's last victory vs. Alabama until 1984, and the Commodores' last vs. the Crimson Tide in Nashville until 2024.

Years later Watson Brown said in a 2007 interview of coach Bryant

Coach Bryant, before the game, walked by and was cutting up with me. He said, "you couldn’t throw when I recruited you, you can’t throw now and you’ll never be able to throw." He just kept walking and patted me on the head. Then after we won the game, he found me in all the melee and it was melee. He gave me a hug and didn't say anything and strolled into the locker room.

When I couldn’t play anymore and decided I wanted to coach, Coach Bryant really got me started and I called him for advice on every job I was offered until the day he died. He kind of took me under his wing and said, "I’ll help you go here, maybe don’t go here." It was real neat that I didn't play for him, but he took care of me until he passed away.

=== Tennessee ===
Third Saturday in October

Team	1	2	3	4	Total
• #7 Tennessee	21	3	3	14	41
#20 Alabama	0	0	0	14	14

- Date: October 18
- Location: Legion Field
  Birmingham, AL
- Game attendance: 72,443

After their loss at Vanderbilt, Alabama dropped from the No. 13 to No. 20 position of the AP Poll prior to their game against Tennessee. Against Tennessee, the Volunteers took a 34–0 lead into the fourth quarter en route to a 41–14 victory at Legion Field. Tennessee took a commanding 21–0 first quarter lead with three touchdowns. The first was scored on a five-yard Bobby Scott pass to Gary Kreis, the second on a 71-yard Bobby Majors punt return and the third on a 27-yard Jackie Walker fumble return. George Hunt made the halftime score 24–0 with his 22-yard field goal in the second and extended it to 27–0 with his 31-yard field goal in the third.

After Scott brought the Volunteers' lead to 34–0 with his two-yard touchdown run in the fourth, Alabama scored their first points on a one-yard Johnny Musso run. The game then closed with a six-yard Richard Callaway run for Tennessee and a six-yard Musso run for a touchdown that made the final score 41–14. The loss was the first time Coach Bryant lost three consecutive games to the same opponent as Alabama's head coach.

=== Clemson ===
Team	1	2	3	4	Total
• Alabama	14	14	0	10	38
Clemson	0	7	0	6	13

- Date: October 25
- Location: Memorial Stadium
  Clemson, SC
- Game attendance: 41,384

After their blowout loss at home against Tennessee, Alabama dropped from the No. 20 position out of the AP Poll altogether prior to their game at Clemson. At Memorial Stadium, the Crimson Tide ended their two-game losing steak with this 38–13 win over the Tigers of the Atlantic Coast Conference. Alabama managed to take a 28–0 lead late into the second quarter before Clemson scored their first points of the game. The Crimson Tide scored first-quarter touchdowns on runs of 36-yards by George Ranager and nine-yards by Johnny Musso, and they scored second-quarter touchdowns on receptions of 40-yards by Ranager from Neb Hayden and 20-yards by Bubba Sawyer from Scott Hunter. Clemson then made the halftime score 28–7 after John McMakin caught a five-yard touchdown pass from Tommy Kendrick.

After a scoreless third quarter, the Crimson Tide extended their lead to 38–7 on a one-yard Musso touchdown run and a 39-yard Oran Buck field goal. The Tigers then closed the game with a two-yard Ray Yauger touchdown run that made the final score 38–13.

The win was Bryant's 100th win at Alabama, making him only the second coach to win 100 games as head coach of the Crimson Tide.

=== Mississippi State ===
Team	1	2	3	4	Total
• Alabama	10	0	0	13	23
Mississippi State	7	0	0	12	19

- Date: November 2
- Location: Memorial Stadium
  Jackson, MS
- Game attendance: 36,517

At Jackson, Alabama defeated the Mississippi State Bulldogs 23–19 in Mississippi Veterans Memorial Stadium. After Richard Ciemny gave the Crimson Tide an early 3–0 lead with his 30-yard field goal, Don Dudley gave State a 7–3 lead with his 16-yard touchdown run. Pete Jilleba then scored for Alabama on a three-yard run that made the score 10–7 in favor of the Crimson Tide that held through the fourth after scoreless second and third quarters.

In the fourth, both teams traded a pair of touchdowns with Alabama eventually winning the game 23–19. Crimson Tide touchdowns were scored on Johnny Musso runs of four and 25-yards and State touchdowns were scored on a six-yard Tommy Pharr run and a two-yard Pharr pass to Bob Young.

=== LSU ===
Team	1	2	3	4	Total
Alabama	0	3	0	12	15
• #12 LSU	0	3	10	7	20

- Date: November 8
- Location: Tiger Stadium
  Baton Rouge, LA
- Game attendance: 67,590

Playing at night before a sold-out Tiger Stadium, Alabama was defeated by the LSU Tigers 20–15. After a scoreless first quarter, field goals of 30-yards by Mark Lumpkin for LSU and 26-yards by Oran Buck for Alabama made the halftime score 3–3. LSU then took a 13–3 lead in the third quarter after a one-yard Allen Shorey touchdown run and a 25-yard Lumpkin field goal.

In the fourth, the teams traded touchdowns with the Tigers' ultimately winning 20–15. Fourth-quarter touchdowns were scored by LSU on a second one-yard Shorey run and by Alabama on Scott Hunter passes of 37-yards to Hunter Husband and 34-yards to David Bailey.

=== Miami (FL) ===
Team	1	2	3	4	Total
Miami	0	0	6	0	6
• Alabama	7	21	7	7	42

- Date: November 15
- Location: Denny Stadium
  Tuscaloosa, AL
- Game attendance: 57,596

On homecoming in Tuscaloosa, Alabama defeated the Miami Hurricanes 42–6 and with their sixth victory of the season became bowl eligible. The Crimson Tide took a 7–0 lead in the first on a two-yard Scott Hunter touchdown run before they scored three in the second quarter. Alabama led 28–0 at halftime after a one-yard Johnny Musso touchdown run and Neb Hayden touchdown passes of 21-yards to Musso and 16-yards to George Ranager.

After Miami scored their only points of the game early in the third on an eight-yard Kelly Cochrane touchdown pass to Joe Schmidt that made the score 28–6. Alabama then closed the game with a three-yard Phil Chaffin touchdown run in the third and on an 18-yard Stephen Doran touchdown reception from Benny Rippetoe in the fourth that made the final score 42–6.

=== Auburn ===
Iron Bowl

Team	1	2	3	4	Total
• #12 Auburn	0	14	14	21	49
Alabama	3	7	7	9	26

- Date: November 29
- Location: Legion Field
  Birmingham, AL
- Game attendance: 72,303

In their final regular season game, Alabama was defeated by the Auburn Tigers in the annual Iron Bowl game 49–26 at Legion Field. After Alabama took a 3–0 lead on a 32-yard Oran Buck field goal in the first quarter, Auburn went on to outscore the Crimson Tide 49 to 23 over the final three quarters of the game. In the second, Wallace Clark scored a pair of touchdowns on runs of one and three-yards for the Tigers and Hunter Husband scored for Alabama on a four-yard run that made the halftime score 14–10.

In the third quarter, Auburn extended their lead to 28–10 on touchdown runs of four-yards by Pat Sullivan and one-yard by Mickey Zofko before George Ranager had a 100-yard kickoff return that made the score 28–17 as they entered the fourth quarter. After Buck connected on a 27-yard field goal early in the fourth for Alabama, Auburn scored three consecutive touchdowns that extended their lead to 49–20. These were scored by Zofko on a nine-yard run, by Clark on a three-yard run and by Connie Frederick on an 84-yard run. The Crimson Tide closed the game with a seven-yard Scott Hunter touchdown pass to David Bailey that made the final score 49–26.

=== Colorado ===
Liberty Bowl

Team	1	2	3	4	Total
Alabama	0	19	14	0	33
• Colorado	10	21	0	16	47

- Date: December 13
- Location: Memphis Memorial Stadium
  Memphis, TN
- Game attendance: 50,144

On November 17, Alabama accepted an invitation to play in the Liberty Bowl against an unnamed opponent at the time of its announcement. The next week, Colorado of the Big Eight Conference defeated Kansas State in their regular season finale and accepted an invitation to play the Crimson Tide at the Liberty Bowl. Against the Buffaloes, Alabama lost 47–33 and completed the first five-loss season during Bryant's tenure as head coach in the first all-time meeting between the schools.

The Buffaloes took a 10–0 first quarter lead on a 13-yard Ward Walsh touchdown run and 30-yard Dave Haney field goal. After they extended their lead further to 17–0 on a three-yard Bobby Anderson touchdown run early in the second, Alabama responded with a pair of touchdown runs that cut the Colorado lead to 17–13. The first was on a 31-yard Scott Hunter run and the second on a six-yard George Ranager run. The teams then traded two more touchdowns on runs of 15-yards by Walsh for Colorado and two-yards by Johnny Musso before Steve Engel had 91-yard kickoff return that made the halftime score 31–19.

The Crimson Tide then rallied and took a 33–31 lead in the third quarter on a pair of Neb Hayden touchdown throws. The first was to Griff Langston from 51-yards and the second to Musso from ten-yards. Colorado then responded with a pair of unanswered touchdowns and a safety in the fourth quarter and won the game 47–33. Touchdowns were scored on Anderson runs of two and three-yards with a combined quarterback sack of Hayden for a safety by Bill Brundige and Herb Orvis providing the final margin.

== NFL draft ==
Several players that were varsity lettermen from the 1969 squad were drafted into the National Football League (NFL) in the 1971 and 1972 drafts. These players included the following:

Year	Round	Overall	Player name	Position	NFL team
1971 NFL draft	6	140	Scott Hunter	Quarterback	Green Bay Packers
1972 NFL draft	3	62	Johnny Musso	Running back	Chicago Bears
1972 NFL draft	11	266	David Bailey	Wide receiver	Green Bay Packers
1972 NFL draft	15	386	Robin Parkhouse	Linebacker	Baltimore Colts
1972 NFL draft	16	411	Steve Higginbottom	Defensive back	Washington Redskins

== Freshman squad ==
Prior to the 1972 NCAA University Division football season, NCAA rules prohibited freshmen from participating on the varsity team, and as such many schools fielded freshmen teams. The Alabama freshmen squad was led by coach Clem Gryska for the 1969 season and finished with a record of three wins and two losses (3–2). The Baby Tide opened their season with a 13–7 loss against Mississippi State at Scott Field. After Alabama took a 7–0 lead on a one-yard Steve Wade run in the second, Billy Baker threw for both of the State touchdowns. The first was from 39-yards to Emil Petro in the third and the second was from 56-yards to Lewis Grubbs in the fourth for the 13–7 victory. In their second game, the Alabama freshmen defeated Vanderbilt 12–8 at Denny Stadium. After a scoreless first, Butch Hobson gave Alabama a 7–0 halftime lead with his short touchdown run, and a pair of Randy Moore field goals in the second half accounted for the 12 Crimson points. The Commodores scored their only touchdown in the fourth quarter on a 44-yard Pete Power touchdown pass to Cliff Flemore.

In their third game, the Alabama freshmen defeated Ole Miss 13–6 at Denny Stadium. After a 30-yard Randy Moore field goal gave Alabama a 3–0 first quarter lead, Johnny Sharpless scored on an eight-yard touchdown run in the second for a 10–0 halftime lead. Moore connected on a 33-yard field goal in the third and then Ole Miss scored their only points in the final minute of the game on a one-yard Norris Weese touchdown run. After a 35–0 victory at Tennessee, the Baby Tide closed the season with a 17–9 loss to Auburn at Cliff Hare Stadium

== Personnel ==
=== Varsity letter winners ===
Player	Hometown	Position
David Bailey	Bailey, Mississippi	Split end
Jeff Beard	Bessemer, Alabama	Defensive tackle
David Beddingfield	Gadsden, Alabama	Quarterback
Bill Blair	Nashville, Tennessee	Defensive back
Paul Boschung	Tuscaloosa, Alabama	Defensive tackle
Oran Buck	Oak Ridge, Tennessee	Placekicker
Phil Chaffin	Huntsville, Alabama	Fullback
Richard Ciemny	Anthony, Kansas	Placekicker
Hugh Clay	Gadsden, Alabama	Guard
Mike Dean	Decatur, Georgia	Defensive back
Stephen Doran	Murray, Kentucky	Tight end
Reid Drinkard	Linden, Alabama	Offensive guard
Jim Duke	Columbus, Georgia	Defensive tackle
Ken Emerson	Columbus, Georgia	Defensive back
Charles Ferguson	Cuthbert, Georgia	Offensive guard
Richard Ferguson	Fort Payne, Alabama	Offensive guard
Danny Ford	Gadsden, Alabama	Offensive tackle
Danny Gilbert	Geraldine, Alabama	Defensive back
Don Gossett	Knoxville, Tennessee	Guard
James Grammer	Hartselle, Alabama	Center
Richard Grammer	Hartselle, Alabama	Center
Mike Hand	Tuscumbia, Alabama	Linebacker
Don Harris	Vincent, Alabama	Defensive tackle
Neb Hayden	Charlotte, North Carolina	Quarterback
Robert Higginbotham	Hueytown, Alabama	Defensive back
Scott Hunter	Prichard, Alabama	Quarterback
Hunter Husband	Nashville, Tennessee	Tight end
Woodward Husband	Nashville, Tennessee	Linebacker
Thomas Israel	Haleyville, Alabama	Guard
Kenneth James	Columbus, Georgia	Tackle
Pete Jilleba	Madison, New Jersey	Fullback
Donny Johnston	Birmingham, Alabama	Halfback
Griff Langston	Birmingham, Alabama	Split end
Mickey Lee	Enterprise, Alabama	Fullback
Frank Mann	Birmingham, Alabama	Placekicker
Pete Moore	Hopkinsville, Kentucky	Fullback
Johnny Musso	Birmingham, Alabama	Halfback
Robin Parkhouse	Orlando, Florida	Defensive end
George Ranager	Meridian, Mississippi	Split end
Wayne Rhoads	Jackson, Mississippi	Defensive end
Ronnie Roddam	Birmingham, Alabama	Center
Jimmy Rosser	Birmingham, Alabama	Offensive tackle
Terry Rowell	Heidelberg, Mississippi	Defensive tackle
Alvin Samples	Tarrant, Alabama	Offensive guard
Mike Sasser	Brewton, Alabama	Defensive back
Bubba Sawyer	Fairhope, Alabama	Split end
Buddy Seay	Dadeville, Alabama	Halfback
Jim Simmons	Yazoo City, Mississippi	Tight end
Robert Stanford	Albany, Georgia	Offensive tackle
Rocky Stone	Birmingham, Alabama	Guard
Ken Wilder	Columbiana, Alabama	Offensive tackle
Steven Williams	Moline, Illinois	Defensive back

=== Coaching staff ===
Name	Position	Seasons at Alabama	Alma mater
Bear Bryant	Head coach	12	Alabama (1936)
Sam Bailey	Assistant coach	12	Ouachita Baptist (1949)
John David Crow	Assistant coach	1	Texas A&M (1958)
Ken Donahue	Assistant coach	6	Tennessee (1951)
Pat Dye	Assistant coach	5	Georgia (1962)
Jim Goostree	Assistant coach	13	Tennessee (1952)
Clem Gryska	Assistant coach	10	Alabama (1948)
Dude Hennessey	Assistant coach	10	Kentucky (1955)
Carney Laslie	Assistant coach	13	Alabama (1934)
Mal Moore	Assistant coach	6	Alabama (1962)
Dee Powell	Assistant coach	7	Texas A&M (1957)
Hayden Riley	Assistant coach	12	Alabama (1948)
Tom Rogers	Assistant coach	4	Delta State (1956)
Jack Rutledge	Assistant coach	4	Alabama (1962)
Jimmy Sharpe	Assistant coach	7	Alabama (1962)
Steve Sloan	Assistant coach	2	Alabama (1966)
Richard Williamson	Assistant coach	6	Alabama (1963)
