= Bobby Anderson (American football) =

American football player (born 1947)

No. 11, 33, 40
- Position: Halfback

Personal information
- Born: October 11, 1947 (age 79); Midland, Michigan, U.S.
- Listed height: 6 ft 0 in (1.83 m)
- Listed weight: 208 lb (94 kg)

Career information
- High school: Boulder (Boulder, Colorado)
- College: Colorado (1967–1969)
- NFL draft: 1970: 1st round, 11th overall pick

Career history
- Denver Broncos (1970–1973); Dallas Cowboys (1975)*; New England Patriots (1975); Washington Redskins (1975); Denver Broncos (1976)*
- * Offseason or practice squad member only

Awards and highlights
- Consensus All-American (1969); 2× First-team All-Big Eight (1968, 1969); Second-team All-Big Eight (1967); Colorado Buffaloes No. 11 retired

Career NFL statistics
- Rushing yards: 1,282
- Rushing average: 4.1
- Rushing touchdowns: 9
- Receptions: 84
- Receiving yards: 861
- Receiving touchdowns: 2
- Stats at Pro Football Reference
- College Football Hall of Fame

Robert Conrad Anderson (born October 11, 1947) is an American former professional football player who was a halfback in the National Football League (NFL) for five seasons during the 1970s. He played college football for the Colorado Buffaloes, earning consensus All-American honors in 1969. He was selected in the first round of the 1970 NFL draft, and played in the league for the Denver Broncos, New England Patriots and Washington Redskins of the National Football League (NFL). Anderson was inducted into the College Football Hall of Fame in 2006.

== Early life ==
Anderson was born in Midland, Michigan. He attended Boulder High School in Boulder, Colorado; following his senior season at Boulder he won the Gold Helmet award for being Colorado's top football player.

== College career ==
Anderson attended the University of Colorado Boulder, where he played for the Buffaloes from 1967 to 1969. He was the Buffaloes' dual-threat running quarterback during his sophomore and junior seasons, and led the team in both rushing and passing. The 1967 Buffaloes finished 9–2 and second in the Big Eight Conference, and Anderson scored twice as Colorado beat the Miami Hurricanes in the Bluebonnet Bowl. The 1968 Buffaloes finished 8–3, for third in the conference. When the 1969 Buffaloes faced injuries in the backfield, Anderson shifted to running back for the third game. The team finished third in the conference and went to the Liberty Bowl, where he rushed for a bowl record 254 yards and three touchdowns in a 47–33 victory over the Alabama Crimson Tide. Following his senior season, Anderson was recognized as a consensus first-team All-American.

Anderson's older brother Dick played for Colorado as a defensive back from 1965 to 1967.

== Professional career ==
The Denver Broncos selected Anderson in the first round (11th pick overall) of the 1970 NFL Draft, and he played for the Broncos from 1970 to 1973. He played a final NFL season in 1975, splitting the year between the New England Patriots and Washington Redskins. In five NFL seasons, Anderson played in fifty-three games, and rushed 313 times for 1,282 yards and nine touchdowns. He also had eighty-four receptions for 861 yards and two touchdowns.

== Post-playing career ==
Anderson formerly served as a long-time broadcaster on the CU Football Network. Anderson also appeared in the 1977 Robby Benson movie One on One as "Hitman King", as well as in the 1985 Kevin Costner bicycling film American Flyers as a reporter.
