= 1969 Auburn Tigers football team =

American college football season

1969 Auburn Tigers football

Astro-Bluebonnet Bowl, L 7–36 vs. Houston
- Conference: Southeastern Conference

Ranking
- Coaches: No. 15
- AP: No. 20
- Record: 8–3 (5–2 SEC)
- Head coach: Ralph Jordan (19th season)
- Captain: Mike Kolen
- Home stadium: Cliff Hare Stadium

1969 Southeastern Conference football standings
	Conf.					Overall
Team	W		L		T	W		L		T
No. 15 Tennessee $	5	–	1	–	0	9	–	2	–	0
No. 10 LSU	4	–	1	–	0	9	–	1	–	0
No. 20 Auburn	5	–	2	–	0	8	–	3	–	0
No. 14 Florida	3	–	1	–	1	9	–	1	–	1
No. 8 Ole Miss	4	–	2	–	0	8	–	3	–	0
Georgia	2	–	3	–	1	5	–	5	–	1
Vanderbilt	2	–	3	–	0	4	–	6	–	0
Alabama	2	–	4	–	0	6	–	5	–	0
Kentucky	1	–	6	–	0	2	–	8	–	0
Mississippi State	0	–	5	–	0	3	–	7	–	0
$ – Conference champion; Rankings from AP Poll

The 1969 Auburn Tigers football team represented Auburn University in the 1969 NCAA University Division football season. It was the Tigers' 78th overall and 36th season as a member of the Southeastern Conference (SEC). The team was led by head coach Ralph Jordan, in his 19th year, and played their home games at Cliff Hare Stadium in Auburn, Alabama. They finished with a record of eight wins and three losses (8–3 overall, 5–2 in the SEC) and with a loss against Houston in the Astro-Bluebonnet Bowl.

== Schedule ==
Date	Opponent	Rank	Site	TV	Result	Attendance	Source
September 20	Wake Forest*	No. 20	Cliff Hare Stadium; Auburn, AL		W 57–0	35,000	
September 27	at No. 19 Tennessee	No. 17	Neyland Stadium; Knoxville, TN (rivalry)	ABC	L 19–45	57,826	
October 4	Kentucky		Cliff Hare Stadium; Auburn, AL		W 44–3	38,000	
October 11	Clemson*	No. 20	Cliff Hare Stadium; Auburn, AL (rivalry)		W 51–0	38,000	
October 18	at Georgia Tech*	No. 15	Grant Field; Atlanta, GA (rivalry)		W 17–14	59,464	
October 25	at No. 9 LSU	No. 14	Tiger Stadium; Baton Rouge, LA (rivalry)	ABC	L 20–21	65,000	
November 1	No. 7 Florida	No. 17	Cliff Hare Stadium; Auburn, AL (rivalry)		W 38–12	50,086	
November 8	Mississippi State^{†}	No. 11	Cliff Hare Stadium; Auburn, AL		W 52–13	47,600	
November 15	at No. 16 Georgia	No. 11	Sanford Stadium; Athens, GA (rivalry)		W 16–3	59,306	
November 29	vs. Alabama	No. 12	Legion Field; Birmingham, AL (Iron Bowl)		W 49–26	72,303	
December 31	vs. No. T–17 Houston*	No. 12	Houston Astrodome; Houston, TX (Astro-Bluebonnet Bowl)	Hughes	L 7–36	55,203	
*Non-conference game; ^{†}Homecoming; Rankings from AP Poll released prior to the game

== Game summaries ==
=== Clemson ===
Team	1	2	3	4	Total
Clemson	0	0	0	0	0
• Auburn	0	23	21	7	51

- Date: October 11
- Location: Cliff Hare Stadium, Auburn, Alabama
- Game attendance: 38,000

Scoring summary
Q2	AUB	Frederick 39 yard pass from Sullivan (Riley kick)	AUB 7–0
Q2	AUB	Sullivan 1 yard run (Riley kick)	AUB 14–0
Q2	AUB	Riley 22 yard field goal	AUB 17–0
Q2	AUB	Frederick 43 yard pass from Sullivan (kick failed)	AUB 23–0
Q3	AUB	Beasley 8 yard pass from Sullivan (Riley kick)	AUB 30–0
Q3	AUB	Zofko 3 yard run (Riley kick)	AUB 37–0
Q3	AUB	Traylor 2 yard run (Riley kick)	AUB 44–0
Q4	AUB	Traylor 8 yard run (Riley kick)	AUB 51–0

=== Alabama ===
Team	1	2	3	4	Total
Alabama	3	7	7	9	26
• Auburn	0	14	14	21	49

- Date: November 29
- Location: Legion Field, Birmingham, Alabama

Scoring summary
1	Alabama	Buck 32-yard field goal	Alabama 3-0
2	Auburn	Clark 1-yard run (Riley kick)	Auburn 7-3
2	Alabama	Husband 4-yard pass from Hunter (Buck kick)	Alabama 10-7
2	Auburn	Clark 3-yard run (Riley kick)	Auburn 14-10
3	Auburn	Sullivan 3-yard run (Riley kick)	Auburn 21-10
3	Auburn	Zofko 1-yard run (Riley kick)	Auburn 28-10
3	Alabama	Ranager 100-yard kickoff return (Buck kick)	Auburn 28-17
4	Alabama	Buck 27-yard field goal	Auburn 28-20
4	Auburn	Zofko 9-yard run (Riley kick)	Auburn 35-20
4	Auburn	Clark 1-yard run (Riley kick)	Auburn 42-20
4	Auburn	Frederick 85-yard run (Riley kick)	Auburn 49-20
4	Alabama	Bailey 7-yard pass from Hunter (run failed)	Auburn 49-26

Auburn's first win versus Alabama since 1963.

== Personnel ==
1969 Auburn Tigers football team roster
Players
Coaches
Offense

Pos.	#	Name	Class
FB	32	Mac Crawford	So
QB		Pat Sullivan	So

Defense

Pos.	#	Name	Class
S		Buddy McClinton

Special teams

Pos.	#	Name	Class

Head coach

- Shug Jordan

Coordinators/assistant coaches

- George Atkins
- Tim Christian
- Joe Connally
- Paul Davis
- Bobby Freeman
- Jim Hilyer
- Tom Jones
- Gene Lorendo
- Sam Mitchell
- Bill Oliver
- Claude Saia

Legend

- (C) Team captain
- (S) Suspended
- (I) Ineligible
- Injured
- Redshirt

Roster

== Statistics ==
=== Passing ===
- Pat Sullivan 123/257, 1686 yards, 16 TD, 16 INT

=== Rushing ===
- Pat Sullivan 205 yards

=== Receiving ===
- Terry Beasley 34 receptions, 610 yards (LG: 42), 6 TD

=== Defense ===
- Buddy McClinton 9 INT (school record), 92 yards (LG: 24)
- Larry Willingham 7 INT, 85 yards
- Don Webb 4 INT, 48 yards (LG: 24)

== Awards ==
- All-Americans: S Buddy McClinton
- All-SEC: C Tom Banks, LB Mike Kolen, S Buddy McClinton, PK John Riley
- Cliff Hare Award: Al Griffin
