= 1969 Georgia Bulldogs football team =

American college football season

1969 Georgia Bulldogs football

Sun Bowl, L 6–45 vs. Nebraska
- Conference: Southeastern Conference
- Record: 5–5–1 (2–3–1 SEC)
- Head coach: Vince Dooley (6th season)
- Defensive coordinator: Erk Russell (6th season)
- Home stadium: Sanford Stadium

1969 Southeastern Conference football standings
	Conf.					Overall
Team	W		L		T	W		L		T
No. 15 Tennessee $	5	–	1	–	0	9	–	2	–	0
No. 10 LSU	4	–	1	–	0	9	–	1	–	0
No. 20 Auburn	5	–	2	–	0	8	–	3	–	0
No. 14 Florida	3	–	1	–	1	9	–	1	–	1
No. 8 Ole Miss	4	–	2	–	0	8	–	3	–	0
Georgia	2	–	3	–	1	5	–	5	–	1
Vanderbilt	2	–	3	–	0	4	–	6	–	0
Alabama	2	–	4	–	0	6	–	5	–	0
Kentucky	1	–	6	–	0	2	–	8	–	0
Mississippi State	0	–	5	–	0	3	–	7	–	0
$ – Conference champion; Rankings from AP Poll

The 1969 Georgia Bulldogs football team represented the University of Georgia as a member of the Southeastern Conference (SEC) during the 1969 NCAA University Division football season. Led by sixth-year head coach Vince Dooley, the Bulldogs compiled an overall record of 5–5–1, with a mark of 2–3–1 in conference play, and finished sixth in the SEC.

Some of the more prominent players for the Bulldogs were Jake Scott, Mike Cavan, Tommy Lyons, and Spike Jones.

== Schedule ==
Date	Opponent	Rank	Site	TV	Result	Attendance	Source
September 20	Tulane*	No. 8	Sanford Stadium; Athens, GA		W 35–0	55,235	
September 27	at Clemson*	No. 7	Memorial Stadium; Clemson, SC (rivalry)		W 30–0	43,035	
October 4	South Carolina*	No. 7	Sanford Stadium; Athens, GA (rivalry)		W 41–16	59,452	
October 11	at Ole Miss	No. 6	Mississippi Veterans Memorial Stadium; Jackson, MS		L 17–25	42,581	
October 18	at Vanderbilt	No. 14	Dudley Field; Nashville, TN (rivalry)		W 40–8	25,450	
October 25	Kentucky^{†}	No. 13	Sanford Stadium; Athens, GA		W 30–0	55,781	
November 1	No. 3 Tennessee	No. 11	Sanford Stadium; Athens, GA (rivalry)		L 3–17	59,781	
November 8	vs. No. 13 Florida	No. 16	Gator Bowl Stadium; Jacksonville, FL (rivalry)	ABC	T 13–13	70,862	
November 15	No. 11 Auburn	No. 16	Sanford Stadium; Athens, GA (rivalry)		L 3–16	59,306	
November 29	at Georgia Tech*		Grant Field; Atlanta, GA (rivalry)		L 0–6	60,106	
December 20	vs. No. 14 Nebraska*		Sun Bowl; El Paso, TX (Sun Bowl)	CBS	L 6–45	29,723	
*Non-conference game; ^{†}Homecoming; Rankings from AP Poll released prior to the game

== Roster ==
1969 Georgia Bulldogs football team roster
Players
Coaches
Offense

Pos.	#	Name	Class
OT	78	Wayne Byrd	Sr
QB	12	Mike Cavan	Jr
RB	37	Craig Elrod	Sr
TE		Mike Greene	So
TE	80	Dennis Hughes	Sr
RB	30	Bruce Kemp	Sr
LT		Tom Nash	So
LG		Mayo Tucker	So
C	50	Tommy Lyons	Jr
RG	66	Royce Smith	So
WR	89	Charles Whittemore	Jr

Defense

Pos.	#	Name	Class
LT		Larry Brasher	Jr
DL	69	Tim Callaway	Sr
DL	82	Lee Daniel	Sr
LH		Billy Darby	Jr
DL	60	Steve Greer	Sr
LE		Chuck Heard	So
LB	43	Ronnie Huggins	Sr
DL	84	David McKnight	Sr
S		Buck Swindle	Jr
RH		Phil Sullivan	So
LB		Chip Wisdom	So

Special teams

Pos.	#	Name	Class
P	11	Spike Jones	Sr
PK		Jim McCollough	Sr
PK		Peter Rajecki	Jr

Head coach

- Vince Dooley

Coordinators/assistant coaches

Legend

- (C) Team captain
- (S) Suspended
- (I) Ineligible
- Injured
- Redshirt

Roster
Last update: 2024-12-10
