= Hang time =

Hang time generally refers to how long a (self-)launched object stays in the air:

- In basketball, the length of time a player stays in the air after jumping to score or pass the ball.
- In American football, the length of time a punted ball flies through the air.
- In Australian rules football, the length of time a player is supported above other players while engaged in an aerial contest; for example, attempting a spectacular mark, spoil or ruck.
- In some first-person shooters, the length of time a player flies through the air as the result of a grenade jump.

Hang time may also refer to:

- NBA Hangtime, a 1996 basketball arcade game by Midway Games
- HangTime (roller coaster), a roller coaster at Knotts' Berry Farm
- Hang Time (album), a 1988 album by Soul Asylum
- Hang Time (TV series), an American television show that aired from 1995 to 2000
- Michael Turk, a football player/influencer known as "Hangtime" on YouTube
