= 1969 NCAA University Division football rankings =

- Season: 1969
- Bowl season: 1969–70 bowl games
- Preseason No. 1: Ohio State
- End of season champions: Texas

Two human polls comprised the 1969 NCAA University Division football rankings. Unlike most sports, college football's governing body, the NCAA, does not bestow a national championship, instead that title is bestowed by one or more different polling agencies. There are two main weekly polls that begin in the preseason—the AP Poll and the Coaches Poll.

== Legend ==
	Increase in ranking
	Decrease in ranking
	Not ranked previous week
	National champion
(#–#)	Win–loss record
(Italics)	Number of first place votes
т	Tied with team above or below also with this symbol

== AP Poll ==
	Preseason Aug	Week 1 Sep 22	Week 2 Sep 29	Week 3 Oct 6	Week 4 Oct 13	Week 5 Oct 20	Week 6 Oct 27	Week 7 Nov 3	Week 8 Nov 10	Week 9 Nov 17	Week 10 Nov 24	Week 11 Dec 1	Week 12 Dec 8	Week 13 (Final) Jan	
1.	Ohio State (26)	Ohio State (0–0) (25)	Ohio State (1–0) (35)	Ohio State (2–0) (34)	Ohio State (3–0) (31)	Ohio State (4–0) (27)	Ohio State (5–0) (35)	Ohio State (6–0) (30)	Ohio State (7–0) (25)	Ohio State (8–0) (31)	Texas (8–0) (33)	Texas (9–0) (31)	Texas (10–0) (22)	Texas (11–0) (36)	1.
2.	Arkansas (2)	Penn State (1–0) (5)	Penn State (2–0) (2)	Texas (3–0) (5)	Texas (4–0) (5)	Texas (4–0) (5)	Texas (5–0) (2)	Texas (6–0) (5)	Texas (7–0) (4)	Texas (8–0) (7)	Arkansas (8–0)	Arkansas (9–0)	Penn State (10–0) (5)	Penn State (11–0) (7)	2.
3.	Penn State (3)	Arkansas (1–0) (1)	Arkansas (2–0)	Arkansas (3–0)	USC (4–0)	Tennessee (5–0) (1)	Tennessee (5–0) (1)	Tennessee (6–0) (2)	Tennessee (7–0) (2)	Arkansas (8–0)	Penn State (9–0) (3)	Penn State (10–0) (3)	Arkansas (9–1)	USC (10–0–1)	3.
4.	Texas (1)	Texas (1–0) (2)	Texas (2–0) (3)	USC (3–0) (1)	Arkansas (4–0)	Arkansas (4–0)	Arkansas (5–0)	Arkansas (6–0)	Arkansas (7–0)	Penn State (8–0) (1)	Ohio State (8–1)	Ohio State (8–1)	Ohio State (8–1) (1)	Ohio State (8–1) (2)	4.
5.	USC	USC (1–0) (1)	USC (2–0)	Penn State (3–0) (1)	Penn State (4–0)	Missouri (5–0)	Penn State (6–0) (1)	Penn State (7–0) (1)	Penn State (7–0) (1)	USC (8–0–1)	USC (9–0–1) (1)	USC (9–0–1) (1)	USC (9–0–1) (1)	Notre Dame (8–2–1)	5.
6.	Oklahoma	Oklahoma (1–0)	Oklahoma (2–0)	Georgia (3–0)	Missouri (4–0)	UCLA (6–0)	USC (5–0–1)	USC (6–0–1)	USC (7–0–1)	UCLA (8–0–1)	Missouri (9–1)	Missouri (9–1)	Missouri (9–1)	Missouri (9–2)	6.
7.	Houston (1)	Georgia (1–0)	Georgia (2–0)	Missouri (3–0)	Tennessee (4–0)	USC (4–0–1)	Florida (6–0)	UCLA (7–0–1)	UCLA (7–0–1)	Missouri (8–1)	Michigan (8–2) (1)	Michigan (8–2) (1)	Michigan (8–2) (1)	Arkansas (9–2)	7.
8.	Georgia	Ole Miss (1–0)	Purdue (2–0)	Oklahoma (2–0)	UCLA (5–0)	Penn State (5–0) (1)	LSU (6–0)	Notre Dame (5–1–1)	Missouri (7–1)	Notre Dame (7–1–1)	Notre Dame (8–1–1)	LSU (9–1)	LSU (9–1)	Ole Miss (8–3)	8.
9.	Ole Miss	Notre Dame (1–0)	Missouri (2–0)	Purdue (3–0)	LSU (4–0)	LSU (5–0)	UCLA (6–0–1)	Missouri (6–1)	Notre Dame (6–1–1)	Tennessee (7–1)	LSU (9–1)	Notre Dame (8–1–1)	Notre Dame (8–1–1)	Michigan (8–3)	9.
10.	Missouri	Indiana (1–0)	Tennessee (2–0)	Tennessee (3–0)	Florida (4–0)	Florida (5–0)	Notre Dame (4–1–1)	Purdue (6–1)	Purdue (7–1)	LSU (8–1)	Tennessee (8–1)	UCLA (8–1–1)	UCLA (8–1–1)	LSU (9–1)	10.
11.	Notre Dame	Missouri (1–0)	UCLA (3–0)	UCLA (4–0)	Notre Dame (3–1)	Oklahoma (3–1)	Georgia (5–1)	Auburn (5–2)	Auburn (6–2)	Auburn (7–2)	UCLA (8–1–1)	Auburn (8–2)	Tennessee (9–1)	Nebraska (9–2)	11.
12.	Michigan State	Florida (1–0) (2)	Florida (2–0)	Florida (3–0)	Oklahoma (2–1)	Notre Dame (3–1–1)	Kansas State (5–1)	LSU (6–1)	LSU (7–1)	Michigan (7–2)	Auburn (7–2)	Tennessee (9–1)	Auburn (8–2)	Houston (9–2)	12.
13.	Alabama	Michigan State (1–0)	Michigan (2–0)	Alabama (3–0)	Michigan (3–1)	Georgia (4–1)	Purdue (5–1)	Florida (6–1)	Stanford (5–2–1)	Ole Miss (6–3)	Nebraska (8–2)	Nebraska (8–2)	Ole Miss (7–3)	UCLA (8–1–1)	13.
14.	Indiana	UCLA (2–0)	Michigan State (2–0)	LSU (3–0)	Georgia (3–1)	Auburn (4–1)	Missouri (5–1)	Stanford (4–2–1)	Michigan (6–2)	Stanford (6–2–1)	Ole Miss (6–3)	Ole Miss (7–3)	Nebraska (8–2)	Florida (9–1–1)	14.
15.	Tennessee	Alabama (1–0)	Alabama (2–0)	Notre Dame (2–1)	Auburn (3–1)	Purdue (4–1)	Wyoming (6–0)	Kansas State (5–2)	Florida (6–1–1)	Florida (7–1–1)	Stanford (7–2–1)	Purdue (8–2)	Florida (8–1–1)	Tennessee (9–2)	15.
16.	Stanford	Purdue (1–0)	LSU (2–0)	Stanford (2–1)	Wyoming (4–0)	Wyoming (5–0)	Stanford (3–2–1)	Georgia (5–2)	Georgia (5–2–1)	Nebraska (7–2)	Purdue (8–2)	West Virginia (9–1)	Stanford (7–2–1)	Colorado (8–3)	16.
17.	UCLA	Auburn (1–0)	Stanford (2–0)	West Virginia (4–0)	Purdue (3–1)	Ole Miss (3–2)	Auburn (4–2)	Ole Miss (4–3)	Nebraska (6–2)	Purdue (7–2)	Florida (7–1–1)	Stanford (7–2–1)	Houston (8–2) т	West Virginia (10–1)	17.
18.	Purdue	Arizona State (1–0)	West Virginia (3–0)	Wyoming (3–0)	Stanford (2–2)	Kansas State (4–1)	Colorado (4–2)	Michigan (5–2)	Houston (6–2) т	West Virginia (8–1)	Houston (7–2)	Florida (8–1–1)	Purdue (8–2) т	Purdue (8–2)	18.
19.	Minnesota	Tennessee (1–0)	Wyoming (2–0)	Michigan State (2–1)	Ole Miss (2–2)	Stanford (3–2)	Air Force (4–2)	Air Force (5–2)	Ole Miss (5–3) т	Houston (6–2)	West Virginia (9–1)	Houston (8–2)	West Virginia (9–1)	Stanford (7–2–1)	19.
20.	Auburn	Michigan (1–0)	Ole Miss (1–1)	Auburn (2–1) т; Nebraska (2–1) т	Alabama (3–1)	Air Force (3–2)	Michigan (4–2)	Nebraska (5–2) т; Oklahoma (4–2) т	Air Force (6–2)	Toledo (9–0)	Toledo (10–0)	Toledo (10–0)	Toledo (10–0)	Auburn (8–3)	20.
	Preseason Aug	Week 1 Sep 22	Week 2 Sep 29	Week 3 Oct 6	Week 4 Oct 13	Week 5 Oct 20	Week 6 Oct 27	Week 7 Nov 3	Week 8 Nov 10	Week 9 Nov 17	Week 10 Nov 24	Week 11 Dec 1	Week 12 Dec 8	Week 13 (Final) Jan	
		Dropped: Houston; Minnesota; Stanford	Dropped: Arizona State; Auburn; Indiana; Notre Dame	Dropped: Michigan; Ole Miss	Dropped: Michigan State; Nebraska; West Virginia	Dropped: Alabama; Michigan	Dropped: Ole Miss; Oklahoma	Dropped: Colorado; Wyoming	Dropped: Kansas State; Oklahoma	Dropped: Air Force; Georgia	None	None	None	Dropped: Toledo	

== Final Coaches Poll ==
The final UPI Coaches Poll was released prior to the bowl games, in early December.
One coach on the 35-member board did not vote.
Texas received 28 of the 34 first-place votes; Penn State received four and one each went to USC and Nebraska.

Ranking	Team	Conference	Bowl
1	Texas	Southwest	Won Cotton, 21–17
2	Penn State	Independent	Won Orange, 10–3
3	Arkansas	Southwest	Lost Sugar, 22–27
4	USC	Pac-8	Won Rose, 10–3
5	Ohio State	Big Ten	none
6	Missouri	Big Eight	Lost Orange, 3–10
7	LSU	SEC	none
8	Michigan	Big Ten	Lost Rose, 3–10
9	Notre Dame	Independent	Lost Cotton, 17–21
10	UCLA	Pac-8	none
11	Tennessee	SEC	Lost Gator, 13–14
12	Nebraska	Big Eight	Won Sun, 46–6
13	Mississippi	SEC	Won Sugar, 27–22
14	Stanford	Pac-8	none
15	Auburn	SEC	Lost Bluebonnet, 7–36
16	Houston	Independent	Won Bluebonnet, 36–7
17	Florida	SEC	Won Gator, 14–13
18	Purdue	Big Ten	none
18	San Diego State	PCAA	Won Pasadena, 28–7
18	West Virginia	Independent	Won Peach, 14–3

- Prior to the 1975 season, the Big Ten and Pac-8 conferences allowed only one postseason participant each, for the Rose Bowl.
- The Ivy League has prohibited its members from participating in postseason football since the league was officially formed in 1954.
