= 1969 Tennessee Volunteers football team =

American college football season

1969 Tennessee Volunteers football

SEC champion

Gator Bowl, L 13–14 vs. Florida
- Conference: Southeastern Conference

Ranking
- Coaches: No. 11
- AP: No. 15
- Record: 9–2 (5–1 SEC)
- Head coach: Doug Dickey (6th season)
- Home stadium: Neyland Stadium

1969 Southeastern Conference football standings
	Conf.					Overall
Team	W		L		T	W		L		T
No. 15 Tennessee $	5	–	1	–	0	9	–	2	–	0
No. 10 LSU	4	–	1	–	0	9	–	1	–	0
No. 20 Auburn	5	–	2	–	0	8	–	3	–	0
No. 14 Florida	3	–	1	–	1	9	–	1	–	1
No. 8 Ole Miss	4	–	2	–	0	8	–	3	–	0
Georgia	2	–	3	–	1	5	–	5	–	1
Vanderbilt	2	–	3	–	0	4	–	6	–	0
Alabama	2	–	4	–	0	6	–	5	–	0
Kentucky	1	–	6	–	0	2	–	8	–	0
Mississippi State	0	–	5	–	0	3	–	7	–	0
$ – Conference champion; Rankings from AP Poll

The 1969 Tennessee Volunteers football team (variously "Tennessee", "UT" or the "Vols") represented the University of Tennessee in the 1969 NCAA University Division football season. Playing as a member of the Southeastern Conference (SEC), the team was led by head coach Doug Dickey, in his sixth year, and played their home games at Neyland Stadium in Knoxville, Tennessee. They finished the season with a record of nine wins and two losses (9–2 overall, 5–1 in the SEC) and a loss against Florida in the Gator Bowl.

Tennessee's defense featured Jack Reynolds and All-American Steve Kiner while the offense featured quarterback Bobby Scott throwing to end Ken DeLong. Chip Kell was an All-American guard on the offensive line.

Florida Gators coach Ray Graves' final game saw his club beat the SEC champion Volunteers, 14–13, in the Gator Bowl. The game, which marked the Gator Bowl's silver anniversary had added drama because two days before kickoff word leaked out that Volunteers head coach Doug Dickey, the SEC Coach of the Year, would return to Florida, his alma mater, after the game.

== Schedule ==
Date	Opponent	Rank	Site	TV	Result	Attendance	Source
September 20	Chattanooga*	No. 15	Neyland Stadium; Knoxville, TN		W 31–0	48,942	
September 27	No. 17 Auburn	No. 19	Neyland Stadium; Knoxville, TN (rivalry)	ABC	W 45–19	57,826	
October 4	at Memphis State*	No. 10	Memphis Memorial Stadium; Memphis, TN		W 55–16	50,164	
October 11	Georgia Tech*	No. 10	Neyland Stadium; Knoxville, TN (rivalry)		W 26–8	63,171	
October 18	at No. 20 Alabama	No. 7	Legion Field; Birmingham, AL (Third Saturday in October)		W 41–14	72,443	
November 1	at No. 11 Georgia	No. 3	Sanford Stadium; Athens, GA (rivalry)		W 17–3	59,781	
November 8	South Carolina*^{†}	No. 3	Neyland Stadium; Knoxville, TN (rivalry)		W 29–14	62,868	
November 15	at No. 18 Ole Miss	No. 3	Mississippi Veterans Memorial Stadium; Jackson, MS (rivalry)		L 0–38	47,220	
November 22	at Kentucky	No. 9	McLean Stadium; Lexington, KY (rivalry)		W 31–26	36,500	
November 29	Vanderbilt	No. 10	Neyland Stadium; Knoxville, TN (rivalry)		W 40–27	60,672	
December 27	vs. No. 14 Florida	No. 11	Gator Bowl Stadium; Jacksonville, FL (Gator Bowl, rivalry)	NBC	L 13–14	72,248	
*Non-conference game; ^{†}Homecoming; Rankings from AP Poll released prior to the game

== Season summary ==
=== at Georgia ===
- Curt Watson 197 rushing yards, Don McLeary 100 rushing yards

=== South Carolina ===
- Gary Kreis 151 Rec Yds

=== at Kentucky ===
- Gary Kreis 11 Receptions, 145 Yards

== Personnel ==
Defensive player Defensive end Thomas L Bennett number 86

1969 Tennessee Volunteers football team roster
Players
Coaches
Offense

Pos.	#	Name	Class
B		Benny Dalton
TE		Ken DeLong
G	65	Phillip Fulmer	So
G	50	Chip Kell	Jr
QB		Bobby Scott	Jr
FB		Curt Watson
OT		Frank Yanossy

Defense

Pos.	#	Name	Class
LB	57	Steve Kiner	Sr
DB		Bobby Majors	So
DB		Tim Priest
LB		Jack Reynolds	Sr

Special teams

Pos.	#	Name	Class
K		George Hunt	So

Head coach

- Doug Dickey

Coordinators/assistant coaches

Legend

- (C) Team captain
- (S) Suspended
- (I) Ineligible
- Injured
- Redshirt

== Team players drafted into the NFL ==
Player	Position	Rounds	Pick Overall	NFL team
Jack Reynolds	Linebacker	1	22	Los Angeles Rams
Steve Kiner	Linebacker	3	73	Dallas Cowboys
Herman Weaver	Punter	9	227	Detroit Lions
