= 1969 Gator Bowl =

American college football game

- 25th Gator Bowl
Florida Gators	Tennessee Volunteers
(8–1–1)	(9–1)
SEC	SEC
14	13
Head coach: Ray Graves	Head coach: Doug Dickey
AP / Coaches; 15 / 17	AP / Coaches; 11 / 11
	1	2	3	4	Total
Florida	7	0	7	0	14
Tennessee	0	10	0	3	13
- Date: December 27, 1969
- Season: 1969
- Stadium: Gator Bowl
- Location: Jacksonville, Florida
- MVP: Mike Kelley (LB, Florida) & Curt Watson (FB, Tennessee)
- Referee: Johnny Cook (SEC)
- Attendance: 72,248

The 1969 Gator Bowl was a post-season college football bowl game between the Florida Gators and the Tennessee Volunteers, both representing the SEC. Florida defeated Tennessee, 14–13.

== Game summary ==
The expected high-scoring battle featuring Florida's "Super Sophs" passing attack against Tennessee's powerful ground game led by quarterback Bobby Scott never materialized, as both defenses were superb in the Gators' 14–13 win. Quarterback John Reaves connected with wide receiver Carlos Alvarez for the Gators' only offensive touchdown, and the Gator defense stopped the Volunteers at Florida's one-yard line late in the game to preserve the victory. The game's MVPs were Florida linebacker Mike Kelley, who had an interception, a fumble recovery, a blocked punt recovered for a touchdown, a sack, and 17 tackles, and fullback Curt Watson of Tennessee.

Scoring summary

Quarter	Time	Drive			Team	Scoring information	Score	
Quarter	Time	Plays	Yards	TOP	Team	Scoring information	FLA	TEN
1					FLA	Fumble recovery returned 8 yards for touchdown by Mike Kelley, Dick Franco kick good	7	0
2					TEN	Lester McClain 63-yard touchdown reception from Bobby Scott, George Hunt kick good	7	7
2					TEN	2-yard field goal by George Hunt	7	10
3					FLA	Carlos Alvarez 9-yard touchdown reception from John Reaves, Dick Franco kick good	14	10
4					TEN	9-yard field goal by George Hunt	14	13
"TOP" = time of possession. For other American football terms, see Glossary of American football.							14	13

== See also ==
- Florida–Tennessee football rivalry
