= 1969 Florida Gators football team =

American college football season

1969 Florida Gators football

Gator Bowl, W 14–13 vs. Tennessee
- Conference: Southeastern Conference

Ranking
- Coaches: No. 17
- AP: No. 14
- Record: 9–1–1 (3–1–1 SEC)
- Head coach: Ray Graves (10th season)
- Offensive coordinator: Fred Pancoast (1st season)
- Defensive coordinator: Gene Ellenson (5th season)
- Captain: Mac Steen
- Home stadium: Florida Field

1969 Southeastern Conference football standings
	Conf.					Overall
Team	W		L		T	W		L		T
No. 15 Tennessee $	5	–	1	–	0	9	–	2	–	0
No. 10 LSU	4	–	1	–	0	9	–	1	–	0
No. 20 Auburn	5	–	2	–	0	8	–	3	–	0
No. 14 Florida	3	–	1	–	1	9	–	1	–	1
No. 8 Ole Miss	4	–	2	–	0	8	–	3	–	0
Georgia	2	–	3	–	1	5	–	5	–	1
Vanderbilt	2	–	3	–	0	4	–	6	–	0
Alabama	2	–	4	–	0	6	–	5	–	0
Kentucky	1	–	6	–	0	2	–	8	–	0
Mississippi State	0	–	5	–	0	3	–	7	–	0
$ – Conference champion; Rankings from AP Poll

The 1969 Florida Gators football team represented the University of Florida during the 1969 NCAA University Division football season. The season was the tenth, last, and arguably most successful season for Ray Graves as the head coach of the Florida Gators football team. Graves' 1969 Florida Gators finished their regular season with an overall record of 8–1–1 and an SEC record of 3–1–1, placing fourth among the ten SEC teams. Florida concluded the year with a Gator Bowl victory over SEC-champion Tennessee. Afterwards, Graves resigned from the head coaching position to become the university's athletic director, and was replaced by Tennessee head coach Doug Dickey.

Graves' final Gators squad was led by a surprising group of second-year offensive players known as the "Super Sophs", that included quarterback John Reaves, wide receiver Carlos Alvarez and tailback Tommy Durrance. The team was captained by Mac Steen.

== Schedule ==
Date	Time	Opponent	Rank	Site	TV	Result	Attendance	Source
September 20		No. 7 Houston*		Florida Field; Gainesville, FL		W 59–34	53,807	
September 27		at Mississippi State	No. 12	Mississippi Veterans Memorial Stadium; Jackson, MS		W 47–35	37,000	
October 4		Florida State*	No. 12	Florida Field; Gainesville, FL (rivalry)		W 21–6	63,957	
October 11		vs. Tulane*	No. 12	Tampa Stadium; Tampa, FL		W 18–17	43,102	
October 18		North Carolina*^{†}	No. 10	Florida Field; Gainesville, FL		W 52–2	62,945	
October 25		Vanderbilt	No. 10	Florida Field; Gainesville, FL		W 41–20	48,631	
November 1		at No. 17 Auburn	No. 7	Cliff Hare Stadium; Auburn, AL (rivalry)		L 12–38	50,086	
November 8		vs. No. 16 Georgia	No. 13	Gator Bowl Stadium; Jacksonville, FL (rivalry)	ABC	T 13–13	70,862	
November 15		Kentucky		Florida Field; Gainesville, FL (rivalry)		W 31–6	55,279	
November 29	8:01 p.m.	at Miami (FL)*		Miami Orange Bowl; Miami, FL (rivalry)		W 35–16	70,934	
December 27		vs. No. 11 Tennessee*	No. 15	Gator Bowl Stadium; Jacksonville, FL (rivalry)	NBC	W 14–13	72,248	
*Non-conference game; ^{†}Homecoming; Rankings from AP Poll released prior to the game; All times are in Eastern time

== Game summaries ==
=== Houston ===
In the opening game against the seventh-ranked Houston Cougars, the unranked Gators debuted a new passing offense which set the tone of success for the rest of the season and upset the Cougars, 59–34. Carlos Alvarez had 6 catches and 182 yards receiving.

=== Mississippi State ===
In the second week of play, the Gators beat Mississippi State, 47–25. Alvarez had 12 catches and 180 yards receiving.

=== Florida State ===
Team	1	2	3	4	Total
FSU	0	6	0	0	6
• Florida	0	7	7	7	21

- Date: October 4
- Location: Florida Field, Gainesville, Florida
- Game attendance: 63,957

Scoring summary
2	?	FLA	Alvarez 10 yard pass from Reaves	FLA 7-0
2	?	FSU	Pederson 22 yard pass from Cappleman	FLA 7-6
3	?	FLA	Alvarez 30 yard pass from Reaves	FLA 14-6
4	?	FLA	Durrance 1 yard run	FLA 21-6

The Gators won the matchup over Florida State 21–6 on the back of a defensive surge that was unparalleled in Gator history. The Gators defense, led by junior defensive lineman Jack Youngblood, and sophomore defensive lineman Robert Harrell, sacked FSU quarterback Bill Cappleman eleven times for 91 yards leaving FSU with a total of negative 18 yards rushing in the game. Youngblood had been shifted to defensive end, with Harrell at tackle. Harrell earned National Defensive Lineman of The Week honors.

In addition to the pass rush, the FSU offense fumbled the ball eight times, losing five. Two other Gator sophomores starred in the game as well, All-American wide out Carlos Alvarez and quarterback John Reaves. Alvarez had seven catches for 134 yards.

=== Tulane ===
On "Super Saturday" in Tampa, the Gators came from behind and went for two to beat winless Tulane by an 18–17 score. Alvarez had 11 catches for 146 yards. "It was a damn poor victory, but it tasted a lost better than a defeat would have" wrote Jack Hairston.

=== North Carolina ===
The Gators defeated the North Carolina Tar Heels 52–2 and Alvarez caught 4 passes for 122 yards.

=== Vanderbilt ===
Florida won over the Vanderbilt Commodores 41–20. Reaves threw 5 touchdowns and Alvarez had 11 catches for 112 yards.

=== Auburn, Georgia ===
A Southeastern Conference (SEC) loss to the Auburn Tigers and a tie with the rival Georgia Bulldogs cost the Gators a share of their elusive first SEC football championship.

=== Kentucky ===
In a 31–6 victory over the Kentucky Wildcats, Alvarez had 10 catches for 105 receiving yards.

=== Miami (FL) ===
Florida beat the Miami Hurricanes, 35–16, as Carlos Alvarez had a then-record 237 receiving yards on 15 receptions.

=== Tennessee—Gator Bowl ===
Gator Bowl

Team	1	2	3	4	Total
• Florida	7	0	7	0	14
Tennessee	0	10	0	3	13

- Date: December 27
- Location: Gator Bowl

In a strange twist, the Gators were invited to play coach Doug Dickey's SEC champion Tennessee Volunteers in the December 1969 Gator Bowl. In a game dominated by a Gators defense led by linebacker Mike Kelley (the game's MVP), defensive back Steve Tannen and defensive end Jack Youngblood, the Gators upset the Volunteers 14–13 to cap their 9–1–1 season—the Gators' best ever single-season record to that time. After the Gator Bowl, Ray Graves resigned as the head coach of the Gators football team, but continued as the athletic director of the Florida Gators sports program until 1979.

External videos
- 1969 Gator Bowl, YouTube video.

During the 1960s, Graves compiled an overall record of 70–31–4 (.686) during the decade, making Graves the winningest coach in the history of the Gators football program until that time.

== Roster ==
1969 Florida Gators football team roster
Players
Coaches
Offense

Pos.	#	Name	Class
WR		Carlos Alvarez	So
QB		John Reaves	So

Defense

Pos.	#	Name	Class

Special teams

Pos.	#	Name	Class

Head coach

- Ray Graves

Coordinators/assistant coaches

Legend

- (C) Team captain
- (S) Suspended
- (I) Ineligible
- Injured
- Redshirt
