= Doug Dickey =

American football player and coach

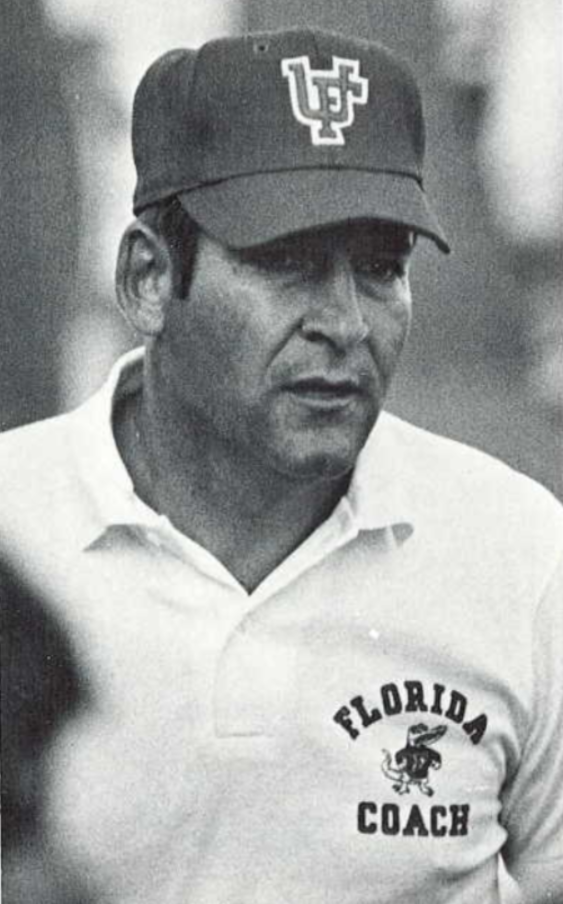
- Dickey from 1971 GATORS yearbook

Biographical details
- Born: June 24, 1932 (age 94); Vermillion, South Dakota, U.S.

Playing career
- 1951–1953: Florida
- Positions: Defensive back, quarterback

Coaching career (HC unless noted)
- 1957–1963: Arkansas (assistant)
- 1964–1969: Tennessee
- 1970–1978: Florida
- 1979: Colorado (OC)

Administrative career (AD unless noted)
- 1985–2002: Tennessee

Head coaching record
- Overall: 104–58–6
- Bowls: 2–7

Accomplishments and honors

Championships
- 2 SEC (1967, 1969)

Awards
- 2× SEC Coach of the Year (1965, 1967); Tennessee Sports Hall of Fame; University of Florida Athletic Hall of Fame
- College Football Hall of Fame; Inducted in 2003 (profile)

Douglas Adair Dickey (born June 24, 1932) is an American former college football player and coach and college athletics administrator. Dickey is a South Dakota native who was raised in Florida and graduated from the University of Florida, where he played college football. He is best known as the head coach of the University of Tennessee and the University of Florida football teams, and afterward, as the athletic director of the University of Tennessee.

== Early life and education ==
Dickey was born in Vermillion, South Dakota, in 1932, and grew up in Gainesville, Florida, where his father was a speech professor at the University of Florida. After graduating from P.K. Yonge High School in Gainesville, he attended the University of Florida and played for coach Bob Woodruff's Florida Gators football team from 1951 to 1953. Dickey was a walk-on after being encouraged by assistant coach Dave Fuller. Dickey began his college career as a defensive back, but he remarkably advanced from seventh on the Gators' quarterback depth chart to starter after Haywood Sullivan's early departure for the Boston Red Sox left the Gators without a starting quarterback in 1952. As a quarterback, Dickey was not a drop-back passer, but a football-savvy game manager, whom Woodruff called "one of the brainiest quarterbacks I ever saw." In January 1953, Dickey led the Gators to a 14–13 win over the University of Tulsa in the Gator Bowl, Florida's first-ever NCAA-sanctioned bowl game.

While a student at Florida, he was a member of the Sigma Alpha Epsilon fraternity (Florida Upsilon chapter). He graduated with a bachelor's degree in physical education in 1954.

== College football coach and athletic director ==
After graduating from the University of Florida, Dickey served in the U.S. Army. From 1957 to 1963, he worked as an assistant football coach on the staff of Frank Broyles at the University of Arkansas.

Dickey was hired as head coach at the University of Tennessee in 1964 by athletic director Bob Woodruff, Dickey's head coach during his playing years at Florida. Many supporters of Tennessee Volunteers football credit Dickey with rejuvenating the program. When Dickey was hired, the Volunteers had not won more than six games in a season, nor been to a bowl game, since 1957. Dickey was recognized as Southeastern Conference (SEC) Coach of the Year in 1965 and 1967, and his Tennessee teams won SEC championships in 1967 and 1969. In his six seasons as head coach, his overall win–loss record at Tennessee was 46–15–4 (.738), and the Volunteers received five consecutive bowl invitations.

One of the brainiest quarterbacks I ever saw.

— Gators head coach Bob Woodruff, on Dickey's skills as a leader and game manager

Dickey is credited with starting three Tennessee football traditions that endure today. He placed the iconic "Power T" decal on the sides of the Volunteers' helmets, had the Neyland Stadium end zones painted in an orange-and-white checkerboard pattern, and originated the Pride of the Southland marching band's "T" formation through which Volunteer players enter the field. Dickey was also responsible for integrating the previously all-white Volunteers by recruiting running back Albert Davis, the first African American offered a scholarship to play for the Vols, but the university did not admit Davis. Undeterred, Dickey recruited wide receiver Lester McClain, who was admitted and became the first black Volunteer football player.

In 1969, the Volunteers clinched their second SEC championship and were invited to play Florida in the Gator Bowl. Rumors swirled that Dickey was planning to return to his alma mater to replace retiring Ray Graves as head coach. Tennessee lost the game 14–13, and Dickey left for Gainesville.

Dickey became the head football coach at the University of Florida in 1970. In his nine seasons as the Florida coach, Dickey led the Gators to four bowl appearances, and an overall record of 58–43–2 (.573). Notably, Dickey gave the Gators' former Heisman-winning quarterback Steve Spurrier his first coaching job, as the Gators quarterbacks coach, in 1978. Dickey did not achieve the same level of success at Florida that he had at Tennessee, and he was replaced by Charley Pell after a 4–7 season in 1978.

Dickey ended his college coaching career with an overall record of 104–58–6 (.637).

Dickey returned to the University of Tennessee, where he served as athletic director from 1985 through 2002, leading one of the premier intercollegiate athletic programs in the nation. His time as athletic director was notable for the improvement and expansion of the university's athletic facilities. Neyland Stadium was expanded to more than 100,000 seats, and other additions included the Thompson–Boling Assembly Center and Arena, the Lindsey Nelson Baseball Stadium, the Goodfriend Tennis Center, executive suites at Neyland Stadium, the Neyland–Thompson Football Complex, and the Thornton Athletics Student Life Center. Dickey also had the unusual experience of watching his son, Daryl Dickey, become the starting quarterback for the Volunteers in the middle of the 1985 season and leading them to a 35–7 win over the Miami Hurricanes in the Sugar Bowl.

== Honors ==
Dickey was honored as "Tennessean of the Year" by the Tennessee Sports Hall of Fame in 2000. He is also the recipient of the National Football Foundation's John Toner Award recognizing his abilities as a sports administrator and the Robert Neyland Memorial Trophy recognizing his contributions to college football, and is a member of the Gator Bowl Hall of Fame, the Tennessee Sports Hall of Fame, and the Knoxville Sports Hall of Fame, and was recognized as a "Distinguished Letter Winner" by the University of Florida Athletic Hall of Fame. After retiring in 2002, he was elected to the College Football Hall of Fame as a coach in 2003.

== Controversy ==
=== Gator flop ===
Florida quarterback John Reaves entered the 1971 game versus Miami looking to break Jim Plunkett's NCAA record for all-time passing yardage in his last regular-season game. The Gators led the game throughout, and were up 45–8 when Reaves threw an interception to Miami's defense with little time left in the game and 14 yards separating Reaves from the record. After calling timeouts to prevent the Hurricanes from running out the clock, the Florida Gators defense dropped down onto their stomachs in unison and allowed the Hurricanes to intentionally score.

Known thereafter as the "Gator flop", the play allowed the Gators to get the ball back so Reaves could break the record. On the next drive, Reaves found Carlos Alvarez for a 15-yard gain to break the record, and after the game, the entire Gators team jumped into the fountain at the Miami Orange Bowl that was formerly used for the Miami Dolphins' live mascot. Hurricanes coach Fran Curci refused to shake Dickey’s hand after the game for pulling "a bush-league stunt", though Dickey denied knowledge the flop was coming. Dickey later blamed it on a punt that was run back earlier in the game. In a 2010 interview, Dickey stated, "I didn't say to lay down, but I said to let 'em score," and later told players, "But at least try to block the extra point."

== Head coaching record ==
Year	Team	Overall	Conference	Standing	Bowl/playoffs	Coaches^{#}	AP^{°}
Tennessee Volunteers (Southeastern Conference) (1964–1969)
1964	Tennessee	4–5–1	1–5–1	10th			
1965	Tennessee	8–1–2	3–1–2	T–3rd	W Bluebonnet	7	7
1966	Tennessee	8–3	4–2	5th	W Gator	14	
1967	Tennessee	9–2	6–0	1st	L Orange	2	2
1968	Tennessee	8–2–1	4–1–1	2nd	L Cotton	7	13
1969	Tennessee	9–2	5–1	1st	L Gator	11	15
Tennessee:		46–15–4	23–10–4				
Florida Gators (Southeastern Conference) (1970–1978)
1970	Florida	7–4	3–3	T–5th			
1971	Florida	4–7	1–6	T–8th			
1972	Florida	5–5–1	3–3–1	6th			
1973	Florida	7–5	3–4	T–5th	L Tangerine	19	
1974	Florida	8–4	3–3	T–4th	L Sugar	12	15
1975	Florida	9–3	5–1	T–2nd	L Gator		
1976	Florida	8–4	4–2	4th	L Sun		
1977	Florida	6–4–1	3–3	5th			
1978	Florida	4–7	3–3	T–4th			
Florida:		58–43–2	28–28–1				
Total:		104–58–6					
National championship Conference title Conference division title or championship game berth
^{#}Rankings from final Coaches Poll.; ^{°}Rankings from final AP Poll.

== See also ==
- List of College Football Hall of Fame inductees (coaches)
- List of Sigma Alpha Epsilon members
- List of University of Florida alumni
