= McCabe (surname) =

The coat of arms attributed to Alexander MacCabe, (fl.1689)

The surnames McCabe (Irish: Mac Cába) and MacCabe (/məˈkeɪb/ muh-KAYB) are Irish and Scottish surnames. As a sept of Scotland's Clan Macleod (and similarly originally Norse Vikings settlers to the Inner Hebrides), McCabes are considered to have moved from the Western Isles of Scotland to Ireland as mercenaries sometime around 1350. McCabes are now found mostly in the United States, Ireland and the United Kingdom, Australia, South Africa, and New Zealand.

== Etymology ==
McCabe and MacCabe are interchangeable Anglicisations of the Gaelic Mac Cába, a patronymic name meaning "son of Cába". The surname can be written in modern Scottish Gaelic as MacCàba and MacCaibe.

The nickname or personal name Cába is of uncertain origin. Patrick Woulfe considered that the surname was possibly derived from a nickname, meaning "a cap", or "hood", or helmet Caba is the Gaelic world for cap, hood, helmet. The name thus means 'the son of the helmeted one'. Henry Harrison suggested the name was from the Gaelic Mac Aba, meaning "son of the Abbot". If Harrison is to be believed then the surname would have a similar etymology as the surnames MacNab, McNab, which are from the Gaelic Mac an Aba, Mac an Abadh.

== Origins ==
According to a pedigree written by Dubhaltach Mac Fhirbhisigh, the MacCabes descend from the MacLeods and king Sitric Silkenbeard.

Bearers of the McCabe and MacCabe surnames are considered to have settled in Ireland from the Western Isles of Scotland sometime around 1350. They were employed as gallowglass (mercenary soldiers) to the O'Reillys and O'Rourkes which were the principal septs of Breffny. In time the MacCabes became a recognised Irish sept, with the chieftain being called "Constable of the two Breffnys".

Later evidence as provided through the McCabe Y DNA project on the FTDNA site suggests there is no connection to Macleods and the origins are entirely separate. The Y DNA studies suggest an Irish origin for the name McCabe.

According to MacLysaght in the mid 20th century, statistics then showed that the surname was more numerous in the Breffny area than anywhere else. MacCabe landowners are also associated with County Monaghan and County Cavan.

The principal families of the name lost their estates after the Battle of Aughrim in 1691.

== Coat of arms ==
According to a genealogy which purports to date from the 17th century, Alexander MacCabe (fl.1689) was a descendant of the last chieftains of the MacCabes. Within the genealogy, his arms are blazoned: vert a fesse wavy between three salmons naiant argent; crest a demi-griffon segreant; motto aut vincere aut mori.,

As the MacCabe name means 'the son of the helmeted one', accordingly the family motto's Latin phrase "aut vincere aut mori" translates to "either to conquer or to die" or "to conquer or die".

== Present day distribution ==
McCabes are now found mostly in the United States, Ireland and the United Kingdom, Australia, South Africa, and New Zealand. The number of McCabes as of 2014 was as follows:

- United States: 42,038
- England: 9,911
- Ireland: 6,975
- Australia: 5,436
- Canada: 4,229
- Scotland: 3,968
- Northern Ireland: 2,120
- South Africa: 1,412
- New Zealand: 1,078
- Wales: 286

In the 1990 United States census, McCabe was ranked 1,200th most common surname, and MacCabe was ranked 43,031st. At the 2000 United States census neither ranked among the top 1,000 most common surnames.

== Notable people with the surname McCabe or MacCabe ==
- Aleksandra Bukowska-McCabe (born 1977), Polish diplomat
- Andrew McCabe (sprinter) (born 1990), Australian sprinter
- Andrew McCabe (born 1968), American law enforcement official
- Bill McCabe (baseball) (1892–1966), player
- Bryan McCabe (born 1975), Canadian hockey player
- Cathal McCabe (born 1963), Irish poet
- Charles Cardwell McCabe (1836–1906), American Civil War chaplain, singer and humorist
- Clare McCabe British-American chemical engineer
- Colin MacCabe (born 1949), British writer and film producer
- Colleen McCabe (born 1952), British headmaster and fraudster
- Dave McCabe (born 1981), English vocalist and musician
- David McCabe (photographer) (1940–2021), British fashion photographer
- Dick McCabe (disambiguation), several people

- Dick McCabe (racing driver) (born 1947), NASCAR driver
- Dick McCabe (baseball) (1896–1950), pitcher in Major League Baseball
- Dick McCabe (American football) (1933–1983), American football player
- Dick McCabe (Australian footballer) (1877–1932), Australian rules footballer

- Donal McCabe, British Royal Communications official
- Edward McCabe (disambiguation), several people

- Edward P. McCabe (1850–1920), American politician
- Edward MacCabe (1816–1885), Cardinal of Dublin
- Edward A. McCabe (1917–2008), aide to President Dwight Eisenhower

- Euan McCabe (born 2005), British diver
- Eugene McCabe (1930–2020), Scots-born Irish writer
- George McCabe (1922–2001), English association football referee
- George P. McCabe (1945–2023), American statistician
- Gerald McCabe (1927–2010), American furniture maker
- Gladys Maccabe (1918–2018), Irish painter
- Harriet C. McCabe (1827–1919), American philanthropist
- Herbert McCabe (1926–2001), British Roman Catholic priest
- Jake McCabe (born 1993), US hockey player
- James H. McCabe (1870–1957), New York politician
- Jerry McCabe (1943–1996), Irish garda
- Jessica McCabe (born 1982), US actress and YouTube personality
- Jewell Jackson McCabe (born 1945), American businessperson
- Jill McCabe (born 1962), Swedish middle-distance runner
- Joan McCabe, American politician
- John McCabe (disambiguation), several people

- John McCabe (composer) (1939–2015), British composer and classical pianist
- John McCabe (writer) (1920–2005), Shakespearean scholar and biographer
- John McCabe pen name of Christopher John McCabe (born 1967), British biologist
- John F. McCabe (born 1958), American judge on the D.C. Superior Court
- John Ignatius McCabe (1926–2001), Roman Catholic priest known as Herbert McCabe
- John J. McCabe (1954–1969), Knights of Columbus murder victim

- Joseph McCabe (disambiguation) several people

- Joseph McCabe (1867–1955), English writer on rationalism and atheism
- Joseph McCabe (hunter) (1816–1865), South African explorer and botanical collector
- Joe McCabe (hurler) (1919–2019), Irish athlete
- Joe McCabe (baseball) (born 1938), American player
- Joseph McCabe (editor) (born 1972), print and online journalist

- Julia McCabe, American politician
- Katie McCabe (born 1995), Irish international footballer
- Kevin McCabe (disambiguation) several people

- Kevin McCabe (businessman) (born 1948), English property businessman
- Kevin McCabe (economist), American economist
- Kevin McCabe (Gaelic footballer) (born 1960), Irish Gaelic footballer
- Kevin McCabe (banjoist), American musician
- Kevin McCabe (American football) (born 1984), American player
- Kevin J. McCabe (born 1958 or 1959), Alaska state representative

- Lida Rose McCabe (1865–1938) American author, journalist, lecturer
- Lorenzo Dow McCabe (1817–1897), American minister, married Harriet C. McCabe
- Martha McCabe (born 1989) Canadian swimmer
- W. Michael McCabe, US environment and energy policy advisor
- Milo McCabe (born 1976), British television presenter and comedian
- Nicholas McCabe (1850–1914), Australian inventor
- Nick McCabe (born 1971), English musician
- Norman McCabe (1911–2006), American animator
- Patrick McCabe (disambiguation) several people

- Patrick E. McCabe (1860–1931), clerk of the New York State Senate
- Patrick McCabe (Irish republican) (1916–1971), member of the List of members of the Irish Republican Army
- Patrick McCabe (novelist) (born 1955), Irish novelist
- Pat McCabe (lacrosse) (born 1969), American player
- Pat McCabe (rugby union) (born 1988), Australian player
- Patrick McCabe (sprinter), winner of the 1982 distance medley relay at the NCAA Division I Indoor Track and Field Championships

- Paul McCabe (born 1959) Australian Rugby league footballer
- Richard McCabe (1960), Scottish actor
- Ruth McCabe (fl. 1970s), Irish stage and screen actress
- Stan McCabe (1910–1968), Australian cricketer
- Steve McCabe (born 1955) English politician
- Thomas McCabe (disambiguation), several people

- Thomas McCabe (United Irishmen) (1739–1820), Irish revolutionary
- Thomas B. McCabe (1893–1982), American businessman, former Federal Reserve Chairman
- Tom McCabe (footballer) (born 1933), New Zealand soccer player
- Tom McCabe (politician) (1954–2015), Scottish Labour Party politician
- Tommy McCabe (born 1998), American soccer player
- Tom McCabe (rugby) (born 1965), Irish footballer
- Tom McCabe (rugby league), Australian player
- Thomas J. McCabe, Sr., developer of cyclomatic complexity, a metric in software engineering
- Thomas Absolem McCabe, bishop of the Roman Catholic Diocese of Wollongong (1951–1974)

- Warren L. McCabe (1899–1982), American chemical engineer
- William McCabe (disambiguation), several people

- William McCabe (footballer), Irish soccer footballer
- William Bernard McCabe (1801–1891), Irish author of historical romances
- William U. McCabe (1880–1931), American attorney and politician from Arkansas
- William Putnam McCabe (1776–1821), organiser for the Society of United Irishmen

- Zia McCabe (born 1975), American musician

== See also ==
- Cabe (disambiguation) § Notable people with the surname Cabe, reduced form of MacCabe
