= Guy Otto Farmer =

American lawyer (1912–1995)

Guy Farmer
- Born: September 13, 1912; Foster Falls, Wythe County, Virginia, U.S.
- Died: October 4, 1995 (aged 83); Washington, D.C., U.S.
- Resting place: Rock Creek Cemetery; Washington, D.C., U.S.
- Education: West Virginia University; University of Oxford
- Occupations: Attorney; federal government employee
- Spouses: Rose Marie Smith (divorced) Helen Marie Joura Farmer (died 1974)
- Children: Guy Otto Farmer Jr.; Mary K. Shaughnessy; Mark M. Farmer; Jane M. Farmer

Guy Otto Farmer (September 13, 1912 – October 4, 1995) was an American lawyer and civil servant. He was Chairman of the United States National Labor Relations Board from July 1953 to August 1955. After leaving government service, he represented the Bituminous Coal Operators Association, the collective bargaining arm of the bituminous coal mining industry in the United States.

== Early life and education ==
Farmer was born September 13, 1912, to Harbert and Kate (Bell) Farmer of Foster Falls, Virginia. He had seven brothers and two sisters. His father was a coal mine foreman, and when Farmer was an infant the family moved to the small town of Maybeury, West Virginia. He was raised in Maybeury, worked in coal mines during school vacations, and graduated from a local high school.

He enrolled at West Virginia University, earning his bachelor's degree in 1934 and his Juris Doctor in 1936. He was admitted to the bar the same year he received his J.D. He was elected to Phi Beta Kappa, Phi Alpha Delta, and the Order of the Coif. He won a Rhodes Scholarship in December 1935, and studied at the University of Oxford from 1936 to 1937.

After returning to the United States, Farmer took up residence in Washington, D.C., in 1937, and in 1938 joined the National Labor Relations Board (NLRB) as an attorney. He later was appointed a regional attorney in both Los Angeles and Minneapolis, where he oversaw other NLRB staff attorneys. From 1943 to 1945, he was associate general counsel at the NLRB's national headquarters.

In 1945, Farmer left the NLRB and joined the D.C. firm of Steptoe & Johnson. Among his many clients at the firm was the Bituminous Coal Operators Association, a group of coal mining companies which bargained as a group with the United Mine Workers of America. Farmer became a partner in the firm in 1949. On September 15, 1950, Robert N. Denham resigned as General Counsel of the NLRB. Farmer was among those named as under consideration by the Truman administration as a successor to Denham. But Farmer was passed over in favor of George J. Bott (who remained General Counsel for most of Farmer's term as chair of the NLRB, his term of office ending on December 20, 1954).

== Nomination as a member to the NLRB ==
A number of political factors led to Farmer's appointment as chair of the NLRB in 1953. Among these was McCarthyism, a strong fear of communism which gripped the United States from 1950 to 1954. Another was the change in political control of the government. In November 1952, Republican Dwight Eisenhower was elected President of the United States, and the Republican Party won majorities in both the Senate and House of Representatives. However, the most influential figure on labor relations and labor law was not Eisenhower but Senator Robert A. Taft of Ohio. Taft had co-authored the Taft-Hartley Act in 1947, legislation which significantly restricted the use of the strike, outlawed the closed shop, imposed a new class of unfair labor practices (ULPs) on unions, and gave states the right to enact right-to-work laws. Throughout the spring of 1953, the House Committee on Education and Labor and the Senate Committee on Labor and Public Welfare conducted hearings designed to lay the groundwork for ideological and doctrinal changes at the NLRB once President Eisenhower was able to appoint a majority of the Board's members. Gerard Reilly, a former NLRB member who had helped draft the Taft-Hartley Act, later wrote that the hearings made it clear that the NLRB under chair Paul M. Herzog had construed the law broadly to rein in employers but adopted a narrow view when it came to union ULPs. Witnesses testified that the Board had restricted employer free speech, crafted loopholes to permit unions to engage in secondary boycotts, found new "rights" that permitted unions to challenge employer lockouts, infringed on states' rights, permitted bargaining during the term of the collective bargaining agreement, and expanded the legal list of mandatory bargaining subjects.

Eisenhower's opportunity to radically change the composition of the NLRB came earlier than anyone thought. Paul Herzog had been nominated to a second five-year term on the Board on July 24, 1950, and confirmed by the Senate on July 31. But after the Republican sweep of 1952, Herzog privately told his friends that he wanted to leave the agency. The political status of the Board deteriorated throughout the spring of 1953. In addition to the House and Senate labor board hearings, the Eisenhower administration embarked on a series of private, high-level negotiations to further amend the Taft-Hartley Act and the National Labor Relations Act (NLRA). Martin P. Durkin, president of the United Association of Plumbers and Steamfitters, had been appointed Secretary of Labor but was considering leaving the department because of opposition within the administration and lack of agreement on the Taft-Hartley and NLRA amendments. Herzog, who had once been on the faculty at Harvard University, began seeking appointment to the faculty of the college. On May 1, 1953, Herzog announced that he would resign as chair of the NLRB effective June 30, 1953.

President Eisenhower's staff quickly selected Farmer as Herzog's replacement. Publicly, Farmer was portrayed as a political independent. He had few personal associations with management and his professional contacts were perceived as legal and contractual rather than ideological. But privately, Farmer was well known as a strong conservative, an avid proponent of states' rights, and an early and avid political backer of Eisenhower. By June 21, Farmer was reported to be Eisenhower's only choice as Herzog's replacement. However, Eisenhower also informed his cabinet that all agency appointments should be cleared with the Republican National Committee (RNC), which was known to be much more conservative on labor issues than the administration. The RNC went so far as to advocate that all Roosevelt and Truman administration appointees to the NLRB be fired, no matter how competent. Farmer's views of federal labor law were strongly conservative. Farmer thought the federal role in labor relations should be delegated to the states. "...I favor as much decentralization as possible; and as much as possible should be done with the board's discretionary authority, which has some limits on it now, to cede to the states by agreement." Farmer advocated wholesale re-examination of the major decision of the Herzog board, especially in those areas restricting employer freedom of speech, permitting bargaining during the contract, and giving unions preferential treatment in captive audience meetings. Farmer was also a vigorous anti-communist, which further heightened his appeal as chairman. He believed that communists had infiltrated not only American labor unions but the staff of the NLRB itself (some at the highest levels of the Board), and that it was his duty to purge the NLRB of these individuals.

Farmer agreed that the Eisenhower administration was locked in a battle for control of the NLRB. He leveled implicit criticism at the Herzog board for imposing an interpretation on the law that favored unions. He felt that gaining control of the NLRB was one of the most important initiatives the Eisenhower administration could undertake:

...this is not pinochle we're playing here. It's not penny-anty. This battle is over control of one of the most powerful agencies that ever existed in Washington—the NLRB. ... I just don't see how you can justify saying that this is really not important because this is what goes on; and there's nothing particularly wrong with it. Well, everything is wrong with it! Everything is wrong with it! Because ... it's becoming worse and worse.

Eisenhower nominated Farmer to be NLRB chair on July 7, 1953, for a term to expire on August 27, 1955. His confirmation hearings were noncontroversial, and he was confirmed by the United States Senate for the position on July 10. He was sworn in on July 13.

== Obtaining a Republican majority on the Board ==
=== Deadlock ===
Even before Farmer was nominated, another seat opened on the NLRB. On June 29, 1953, member Paul L. Styles (a liberal Truman appointee) announced he was resigning from the NLRB effective September 1, 1953. Another seat on the Board was due to come open on August 27, 1953, when member John Mills Houston's term was due to expire (he did not seek reappointment). On July 28, Eisenhower nominated Philip Ray Rodgers to fill Houston's seat. Rodgers was a strong conservative and Taft protégé who considered himself management's representative on the Board. He had advocated a much tougher version of the Taft-Hartley Act than Senator Taft himself preferred, was a vigorous anticommunist, was much more pointed in public than Farmer about rolling back the Herzog Board's decisions, and openly called for stacking the NLRB staff with Republicans to ensure that "appropriate" policy decisions were made.

Farmer was consistently in the minority in NLRB decisions during his first two months on the board, outvoted by the holdover Truman appointees (Houston, Styles, Ivar H. Peterson, and Abe Murdock). Rodgers was sworn in on August 28, and Styles' resignation became effective September 1. This left a 2-to-2 deadlock on the Board which persisted until February 1954. To lay the groundwork for rolling back some of the Herzog Board's decisions, Farmer exercised one of his few powers as chair and announced in late August that the Board would hear more oral arguments.

=== Beeson nomination ===
The conservative millionaire Secretary of Commerce, Sinclair Weeks, was the administration's most vocal and most powerful voice on labor law. Secretary of Labor Durkin was increasingly isolated and ineffective within the administration. As the effective date of Styles' resignation approached, Eisenhower seemed ready to appoint Lawrence E. Gooding, chairman of the Wisconsin Employment Relations Board, to the NLRB as his replacement. But Gooding was opposed by the American Federation of Labor, and Eisenhower (who was courting the more conservative elements in the labor movement) decided against nominating him.

A series of other high-level vacancies left the Eisenhower administration preoccupied through the fall, delaying decisions on a replacement for Styles. On September 10, Labor Secretary Durkin resigned abruptly. As Durkin's replacement, Eisenhower considered Mary H. Donlon (chair of the New York State Workmen's Compensation Board), Representative Samuel K. McConnell Jr. (a congressman from Pennsylvania and chair of the House Committee on Education and Labor), and Roger Lapham (former Mayor of San Francisco). But Republican Senators urged Eisenhower to delay making a decision until Congress came back into session in January. As the Labor post sat unfilled, Chief Justice of the United States Fred M. Vinson died unexpectedly from a heart attack on September 8, 1953. The administration was consumed with the task of identifying a new Chief Justice, and it was not until September 30 that Eisenhower named Earl Warren as his nominee.

Shortly after the Warren appointment, Senator Hubert Humphrey made national headlines after he charged that Farmer and Rodgers were already changing settled policy at the NLRB, and that Eisenhower intended to "pack" the Board with right-wing appointees. Partly to placate labor, two days later Eisenhower named James P. Mitchell, a former Assistant Secretary of the Army and labor relations executive with R.H. Macy & Co. and Bloomingdale's, to the post of Secretary of Labor. Three days later, Eisenhower announced that Mitchell would be the administration's point person on all labor matters.

In November 1953, Farmer wrote to Eisenhower to influence the choice of Styles' replacement. The nominee was bound to be contentious because the individual would give the Republican Party its first opportunity to appoint a majority of the members of the Board. On November 23, he wrote to the President: "It is readily apparent that the person appointed by you to fill the remaining Board vacancy will be in a position to determine in large measure the extent to which the policies of your administration will be effectuated by this agency." Farmer understood that the next appointment to the Board would either give him room to roll back the Herzog Board's decisions or limit his movement and allow the passage of time to give additional weight and authority to those rulings. By early November, the Associated Press reported, Farmer had undertaken an extensive review of the Herzog Board's decisions. Thus far, Farmer had managed to reverse only two decisions (after Murdock abstained several times): A decision which concluded it was an automatic ULP for an employer to question workers about their support for the union, and a ruling that unions could elect leaders who were under indictment for violating the Taft-Hartley Act's requirement that they sign an anticommunist oath. By December, with Murdock continuing to abstain, the Farmer-led Board reversed Bonwit Teller in Livingston Shirt Corp., 107 NLRB 400, (1953), and established a new rule in Peerless Plywood Co., 107 NLRB 427 (1953) (in which both employers and unions were barred from making captive audience presentations 24 hours before an election, but the employer could make such speeches before this period without giving the union equal time). In Chicopee Manufacturing Corp., 107 NLRB 106 (1953), Farmer wrote an opinion in which the board established its "prophecy doctrine": Employers could "predict" that voting for the union might result in a plants moving or plant closures, so long as the employer did not actually threaten to do so (e.g., engage in coercive behavior). The Farmer Board also held that Section 8(c) of the Taft-Hartley Act should be applied to representation elections (overturning General Shoe), and that an employer assertion that it would appeal any union victory in the courts was not a per se ULP but a statement of legal rights.

The administration settled on Albert Beeson as its nominee. The 47-year-old Beeson was an economist (not an attorney) who had been a researcher for the United States Rubber Corporation in 1941, director of industrial relations for National Union Radio Corporation from 1942 to 1947, and director of industrial relations for the Food Machinery & Chemical Corporation after 1947. He had also been vice president of the Employers Council of Santa Clara County, Calif., and the California Personnel Management Association—employers' organizations which (in part) opposed labor unions and promoted labor relations models designed to maximize management rights while minimizing worker demands for unions. Beeson was a personal friend of Vice President Richard Nixon and United States Attorney General Herbert Brownell Jr. (who had strongly supported the Eisenhower campaign in 1952). Nixon and Brownell both recommended Beeson on November 27 for the open NLRB position. Secretary of Labor Mitchell preferred another candidate, but switched his support to Beeson after talking to Nixon. Beeson was also touted by Secretary of Commerce Weeks on December 14, after several of Weeks' friends recommended him. Farmer, too, recommended Beeson, as he had worked with him when Farmer had served as the Food Machinery & Chemical Corp. general counsel. Beeson's name first surfaced in the press on January 4, 1954. He was formally nominated on January 7.

Beeson's confirmation was a difficult one. Beeson did not help his position by speaking frankly about his actions as a corporate director of industrial relations. He testified on January 20 about using the NLRB's employer free speech provisions to defeat a union organizing drive in Pennsylvania, and admitted that he could be fairly described as a union buster. He bluntly accused the Herzog board of twisting the meaning of the Taft-Hartley Act, and said it was his intention to roll back the Board's "pro-labor" bias. He also said that Farmer had been the one to recommend his name to Eisenhower for appointment to the Board. Democratic Senator Herbert H. Lehman pointed to a newspaper report in which Beeson claimed he intended to return to his labor relations job after leaving the NLRB. Beeson said the paper had misquoted him. Democratic Senators Paul Douglas, John F. Kennedy, and Lehman all expressed concern that Beeson was a "company man" and could not administer the law in a neutral way, and won a two-day postponement of his confirmation hearing on January 20. After the postponement expired, all Democrats on the Senate Committee on Labor and Public Welfare boycotted the nomination hearings, depriving the committee of a quorum and preventing it from conducting business. But the boycott didn't last, and after two days the Democrats returned to the committee. On hearings held on January 25, Congress of Industrial Organizations secretary-treasurer James B. Carey (in oral testimony) and United Mine Workers of America president John L. Lewis (in written testimony) both excoriated Beeson as not impartial. The committee then voted 7–6 along party lines to recommend Beeson and send the nomination to the Senate floor.

With most Republicans lukewarm about Beeson and some actually thinking of abstaining or voting against him, Eisenhower began lobbying conservative Southern Democrats to support the nomination. On January 29, Senators H. Alexander Smith (chair of the Senate Committee on Labor and Public Welfare) and Barry Goldwater then publicly questioned the truthfulness of Beeson's January 20 response about the newspaper article. The newspaper, the San Jose Mercury, said it stood by its story. Beeson then made the surprising request on January 30 to speak again before the Senate Labor and Public Welfare Committee. The request was granted. Democratic Senator James E. Murray said Beeson's integrity had been called into question, and all six Democrats on the Senate Labor and Public Welfare Committee said that new revelations that Farmer and Beeson had a pre-existing relationship indicated Beeson would not be independent of Farmer's influence. But during a six-hour hearing on February 2, Beeson admitted that the newspaper article was correct. When directly asked if he had submitted a letter of resignation, he said he had not but had given an oral resignation. He then admitted that he had not stopped making contributions to his company's pension plan, and implied he was really on a leave of absence. He also reversed his January 22 testimony and said Farmer had not recommended him to Eisenhower at all. His revelations led to an adjournment so that Paul L. Davies, president of Food Machinery & Chemical Corporation, could be brought in to testify.

On February 3, Eisenhower publicly reaffirmed his belief that Beeson was the best possible candidate for the NLRB position. When Davies testified before the committee on February 5, he denied that Beeson had orally resigned from the company. Davies said that Beeson had, instead, sought a one-year leave of absence without pay or benefits, and asked that he be permitted to continue to make payments into the company pension plan. Beeson then told the committee that, if confirmed, he would immediately and unequivocally resign in writing from the firm. With the nomination in limbo, the American Federation of Labor formally voted to recommend that Beeson not be approved by the Senate.

Beeson's confirmation almost failed. Republican Senator William Langer refused to support him, as did former Republican (now Independent) Senator Wayne Morse. Eisenhower was forced to put significant political pressure on Republicans to keep them in line. Floor debate was highly charged, with Democrats asserting that Beeson had lied to the Senate and then tried to bargain with senators to win confirmation. Republicans countered that Beeson had resigned as requested, and that Democratic attacks were a veil for their real reason for opposing Beeson (packing the NLRB). On February 18, nearly two weeks after Beeson's "second hearing," he was confirmed by the Senate, 45–42. Three conservative Southern Democrats voted with the remaining 42 Republicans to give Beeson the edge.

== Term as chair of the NLRB ==
=== Reducing the NLRB's jurisdiction ===
Jurisdiction was a major issue for Farmer. The NLRA permitted the Board to exercise jurisdiction only over those businesses engaged in substantial interstate commerce. Farmer believed that the Board had interpreted "interstate commerce" and "substantial" far too broadly, and that the NLRB should get out of the business of regulating the labor relations of local small businesses. The appointment of Rodgers to the Board did not, however, give Farmer the majority he wanted. Farmer believed that the Act only covered businesses with 25 or more employees, while Rodgers believed that the Act reached only those businesses with large cash flows. Beeson was skeptical of both plans because he wanted employers to be protected by the Taft-Hartley Act, and felt that state labor law did not provide this level of protection.

On June 30, 1954, Farmer was able to win Rodgers and Beeson's approval for a new jurisdictional standard for the NLRB. Under the new standard, a company would have to have interstate sales of at least $50,000 a year (double the Herzog Board's standard), supply interstate goods or services worth at least $100,000 (double the Herzog Board's standard), or provide trucking to interstate firms worth at least $100,000 a year (a new standard). Franchises of interstate companies would no longer fall under the Board's jurisdiction. In a series of cases in October 1954, the board applied its new jurisdictional standard, establishing new precedents that eliminated perhaps 25 percent of the NLRB's jurisdiction (although affected less than 10 percent of its caseload and just 1 percent of the number of employees covered). Describing the Board's actions to Sherman Adams (Eisenhower's White House Chief of Staff), Farmer said the NLRB had created a "no man's land" in which the law did not apply.

=== Expanding employer free speech ===
Employer freedom of speech was another major issue for Farmer. Under its first chairman, J. Warren Madden, the NLRB had issued rulings which required employers to remain neutral during union organizing campaigns and elections. The Supreme Court disagreed, however, and said in NLRB v. Virginia Electric & Power Co., 314 US 469 (1941), that employers could express their opinion about unions and union organizing efforts so long as that speech was not coercive. The NLRB subsequently held employer speech was not coercive unless blatantly so or part of a broad pattern of coercive conduct.

But captive audience meetings, a majority of the board felt, were different. A captive audience meeting occurs when an employer requires employees to meet on company time and listen to anti-union speech. After NLRB v. Virginia Electric & Power Co., the NLRB continued to issue rulings that held that captive audience meetings were a per se violation of the NLRA.

Sections of the Taft-Hartley Act were designed to overturn these rulings. In November 1946, voters elected Republican majorities in both houses of Congress. These Republicans were outraged by the NLRB's captive audience rulings. When Congress enacted the Taft-Hartley Act in 1947, Section 8(c) specifically allowed captive audience meetings so long as the employer made no threat of reprisal, threat of force, or promised any benefits during the meeting.

During the tenure of chair Paul Herzog, the NLRB nevertheless continued to issue a series of rulings which held that unions should be granted equal time whenever an employer held a captive audience meeting. In Babcock & Wilcox, the Board even held that unions were permitted to equal time during captive audience meetings. These rulings became known as the Bonwit Teller doctrine, after the name of the first of the post-Taft-Hartley Act captive audience rulings.

Farmer publicly stated his opposition to the Bonwit Teller rulings during the confirmation process. In December 1953, Farmer convinced Democratic appointee Ivar Peterson to join Farmer and Rodgers in deciding Livingston Shirt Corp., which overturned Bonwit Teller. Although Peterson agreed with the outcome of the decision, his rationale for reaching the verdict was on much narrower legal grounds. Farmer did not, however, find the employer's right to hold captive audience meetings absolute. In Peerless Plywood Co. Farmer, Rodgers, and Peterson agreed that employers may not hold captive audience meetings within 24 hours of a union representation election. Two years later, in Economic Machinery Co., Farmer led a unanimous board in holding that one-on-one conversations between the employer and employee about the union is inherently coercive.

=== Restricting "secondary situs" picketing ===
"Secondary situs" picketing is similar to secondary boycotts, and was another area in which Farmer led the Board in making significant changes.

Under Paul Herzog, the NLRB made two decisions involving secondary picketing. The first, Schulz Refrigeration Service, addressed an issue which had arisen in the transportation industry. Delivery trucks were an extension of the primary employer's business. But was picketing the truck while it visited a secondary employer (the secondary site, or "secondary situs" in the Latin phrase) a violation of Section 8(b)(4)? The Herzog Board said no. The second decision, Crowley's Milk Co., addressed the purpose of "secondary situs" picketing. Section 8(b)(4) of the Taft-Hartley Act (enacted the year before Crowley's Milk was decided) forbade secondary boycotts. But did it forbid secondary picketing? Could the union's freedom of speech extend to "secondary situs" picketing if the sole purpose of the picketing was to persuade consumers to boycott the secondary employer? The Herzog Board said such picketing was legal.

Farmer disagreed on both counts. In Washington Coca-Cola Bottling Co., the board held that "secondary situs" picketing could not occur if the primary employer had sites nearby. Picketing should occur at these nearby sites instead. In the same decision, the board strictly limited "secondary situs" picketing to consumer entrances. (Even then, the board barred secondary picketing if those entrances were also used by the secondary employer's employees.) The board also strictly limited the language the union could use on its picket signs. Finally, if the primary and secondary employer shared the same site, the NLRB held, picketing had to be even more limited.

=== Limiting a union's right to strike ===
Farmer also led the Board in setting new boundaries on the right to strike.

The first decision created an affirmative duty of unions to denounce violence on strike picket lines. In BVD Company, Inc., Farmer and a majority of the board refused to order the reinstatement of striking workers who picketed peacefully when other, unidentified individuals committed strike-related violence. There was no evidence of conspiracy, the union and striking workers had no control over those who committed violence, and no evidence existed that the strikers or union had instigated the violence. Nonetheless, the Farmer board held that it was the affirmative duty of the striking workers to discourage violence and disassociate themselves from it. The question, the majority said, was not whether the terminations were right or wrong, but whether the purposes of the NLRA (e.g., labor peace) would be achieved by restoring the workers to their jobs and awarding back pay. Since the purpose of the Act could not be achieved, the NLRB had no power to order it.

The Farmer board also ruled that strikes were the only activity protected by the NLRA. Anything less than a strike was not. In Pacific Telephone and Telegraph Co., the union engaged in a whipsaw strike: Employees randomly struck different locations of the same employer for a short period of time. The Farmer board declared these "intermittent" strikes "neither a strike nor work" and thus unprotected activity, and upheld the employer's termination of the workers. The majority did not define the term "intermittent strike" in Pacific Telephone and Telegraph Co. nor in two subsequent decisions upholding the ruling. The majority provided no rationale for withdrawing the act's protection of such activity, nor why such activity was so destructive of work that it went beyond the pale of the act.

The Farmer-led NLRB tried to extend this reasoning to employer associations, but was ultimately unsuccessful. The situation involved cases where a union negotiated a contract with many employers in the same industry simultaneously. If the union struck one employer in the group, could the other employers lock out its workers? In Morand Bros. Beverage and Davis Furniture, the Herzog board said no. But what if these were whipsaw strikes? The Farmer board in Buffalo Linen Supply Co. held that whipsaw strikes against employers in an employer association were not protected by the NLRA. The International Brotherhood of Teamsters appealed the decision in Morand Bros. Beverage. Subsequently, the U.S. Supreme Court overturned the NLRB in NLRB v. Truck Drivers Local 449.

The NLRB nonetheless continued to extend its less-than-a-strike ruling to other union activities. In Valley City Furniture Co., the employer had unilaterally extended the work day by an hour, and union members had refused to work the extra hour. The employer terminated the workers. Members Beeson and Rodgers held that the union had engaged in activity that was short of a strike, and thus the activity was not protected by the act. Similarly, in Honolulu Rapid Transit Co., the employer implemented a seven-day work week. Again, the workers refused to work the extra time, and were terminated the workers. Again, Beeson and Rodgers upheld the terminations. In these two cases, however, Farmer agreed with the reasoning but not the outcome. In a concurrence in Valley City Furniture, Farmer said it was "unduly harsh and legalistic" to allow an employer to "engage in every and all forms of retaliatory or unlawfully motivated discrimination." Farmer argued in Honolulu Rapid Transit Co. that an employer's retaliatory actions should be limited to those activities which interfered the least with employees' concerted activities. But his reasoning was not adopted by the other members of the majority.

The right to strike was limited in other ways as well. In Auto Parts Co., the employer had multiple work sites. The union struck one work site, and a union member from another work site refused to cross the picket line. Section 8(b)(4)(A) of the act appeared to protect an employee's right to refuse to cross a picket line. But the Farmer board said that Section 8(b)(4)(A) only meant that refusal to cross the picket line was not a union ULP. Section 8(b)(4)(A) did not bar an employer from lawfully terminating the worker. Then, in two cases, the Farmer board limited when a union could strike during its collective bargaining agreement. In several decisions by the NLRB in the late 1940s, the board had held that unions generally could not strike during the life of the collective bargaining agreement. However, as the contract came close to expiring, the union could strike after presenting its bargaining demands—so long as it observed a 60-day "cooling off" period between making the demand and striking. The Farmer board overturned these decisions in Wilson & Co., and Lion Oil Company. The majority said that, in the absence of a clause allowing the sides to re-open the contract during the life of the agreement, no strikes were permitted. Although neither collective bargaining agreement contained a no-strike clause, the majority effectively imposed one on every single collective bargaining agreement in the United States. The board's ruling was upheld by the Supreme Court in National Labor Relations Board v. Lion Oil Company.

=== Bargaining rights and appropriate bargaining unit ===
In regards to collective bargaining, Farmer and the conservative majority on the NLRB were more mixed. In Whitin Machine Works, Farmer joined a majority in holding that unions had the right to see employer payroll data prior to contract negotiations. And in Richfield Oil Corp., the Farmer board held that employers must bargain over employee stock plans they establish. But the Farmer board also limited bargaining rights in Bausch & Lomb Optical Co., holding that if a union invests its surplus dues in a business venture, and that venture competes with the employer, the employer does not have to bargain with the union.

The Farmer board also reversed policy on "craft" units. The American Federation of Labor had long adhered to a policy of craft unionism, where workers with similar skills (a "craft") belonged to the same union. In contrast, the Congress of Industrial Organizations believed in industrial unionism, in which all workers in the same industry are organized into the same union regardless of differences in skill. Early in the NLRB's history, the board held that if there was a history of industrial bargaining, craft workers should not be permitted to create a distinct craft bargaining unit. The rationale was that established labor relations should not be upset, and that craft union raids on industrial units should be avoided in the name of labor peace. In American Potash & Chemical Corp., the Board overturned 15 years of precedent and permitted craft bargaining units to be carved out of industrial bargaining units if the workers voted for this outcome.

=== Limiting the use of card-check ===
Farmer also won board approval for a major limitation on union organizing methods.

The NLB, "first NLRB", and current NLRB had long accepted union organizing cards as proof of majority support for a union in the workplace (an organizing method known as card check). In 1951, the Herzog board reaffirmed this policy in M.H. Davidson. A majority of workers had signed cards authorizing the union to represent them, and the union proceeded to an NLRB-sponsored election. The employer subsequently committed ULPs during the election period, and the union lost the election. The board set aside the election results and certified the union as the bargaining representative. The employer refused to bargain with the union, claiming the union did not represent a majority of employees. The NLRB held this refusal to bargain to be illegal, since the employer's otherwise good-faith assertions about majority status were tainted by its illegal activities during the election. M.H. Davidson had twice been upheld by federal appellate courts.

Farmer strongly disapproved of card check. When he first joined the NLRB, Farmer could not muster a majority in favor of limiting the practice. In Southeastern Rubber Mfg. Co. in 1953, the Herzog board reaffirmed M.D. Davidson. Farmer issued a dissent in the 3-to-1 ruling, arguing that card check was an unreliable method of determining union support. Months later, after a shift in NLRB membership, Farmer assumed chairmanship of the board and was able to overturn Southeastern Rubber Mfg. Co.. In The Walmac Co., the Farmer-led majority specifically overturned M.H. Davidson, finding that the election outcome was final. A year later, the Farmer board went even further. It held in Aiello Dairy Farms that a union has a choice when an employer refuses to recognize the union based on authorization cards: The union can proceed to election, or it can file a ULP alleging that the employer has refused to bargain. Since proving the latter was almost impossible under Southeastern Rubber Mfg. Co., unions were effectively barred from seeking recognition based on card check. In his opinion in Aiello Dairy Farms, Farmer argued that the change in policy was need to prevent unions from wasting the board's time and the public's money by seeking two chances to prove majority status.

=== Expanding employer rights to ask workers about support for the union ===
In 1954, the Farmer board also overturned the NLRB's long-standing rule against employer interrogation of employees about protected union activities. The standard enunciated in Standard-Coosa-Thatcher Co. held that any employer inquiry into an employee's support for the union was a per se violation of section 8(a)(1) of the NLRA. But in Blue Flash Express, the Farmer board held that all questioning was acceptable, absent any clearly coercive content (such as promises, threats, etc.). A year later, the Farmer-led board concluded in Gummed Products Company that employers could lie to workers so long as those lies were not so egregious that they "lowered campaign standards" to the point where worker wishes could no longer be determined.

The Gummed Products Company rule proved difficult to administer. In 1962, the board adopted a four-part test in Hollywood Ceramics Co. to determine what constituted an egregious fabrication. By the mid-1970s, it was clear that Gummed Products Company had caused an explosion in election propaganda, restricted employee freedom of speech, increased litigation, and caused an increasingly large number of board decisions to be overturned by the courts. In 1977, the NLRB overturned Gummed Products Company in Shopping Kart Food Market. But after the appointment of more conservative members to the NLRB, Shopping Kart Food Market was overturned in 1979 in General Knit of California, Inc., which adopted the Hollywood Ceramics standard again. Four years later, General Knit was overturned by yet another new majority of the board and the Shopping Kart Food Market rule reinstated in Midland National Life Insurance Co.. Midland National Life Insurance was reaffirmed by the board in Goffstown Truck Center, Inc. in 2010.

== The Communist oath issue and subsequent court rulings ==
The Taft-Hartley Act required all officers and trustees of labor unions seeking the protect of the National Labor Relations Act to affirm that they were not members of the Communist Party USA. The anti-communist oath provision generated extensive controversy when it became effective on June 23, 1947. The Herzog board struggled to implement the anti-communist oath provisions, but it was the Farmer board which capped these efforts. Farmer publicly supported the Taft-Hartley Act. Although he felt it was not perfect, if properly implemented it would have a positive effect on labor relations.

Implementation of the anti-communist oath began when the newly independent NLRB General Counsel Robert N. Denham issued an official interpretation of the Taft-Hartley Act requiring officials in labor federations to file oaths as well. Although some members of the AFL and CIO challenged Denham's interpretation in court, most affiliates of the AFL threatened to quit the labor federation if it did not expel the non-signing unions. Denham was also challenged by the Herzog board, which voted 4-to-1 on October 7, 1947, to rescind the interpretations. Otherwise, the board acted swiftly to implement the oath provisions. In Rite-Form Corset Co., the NLRB refused to order an election where the petitioning union had not filed the affidavits. However, in Marshall & Bruce Co., the board did not bar such a union from filing a ULP complaint. On November 6, the board ordered all non-filing unions off representation election ballots nationwide. On Fifteen days later, the board declined to certify as a collective bargaining representative any non-filing union which had won an election but not yet been formally certified by the NLRB. However, in January 1948, the United States Department of Labor issued a ruling that non-filing unions with existing contract can still represent their workers. In September 1948, the board further restricted non-filing unions' protection under the law by ordering regional directors to decline to grant hearings to them.

In July 1950, however, the United States Court of Appeals for the District of Columbia overruled Denham's order.

Between 1950 and 1953, the Herzog board made additional rulings regarding the communist oath provision. In September 1950, it held that a non-filing union could not utilize a third party as the official representative on a representation ballot. Three months later, it affirmed the 1948 Department of Labor ruling by holding that an employer must bargain with a union that has failed to file non-communist affidavits. But as several national labor unions continued to refuse to file affidavits, the Herzog board began taking action against them. In March 1952, board said the United Electrical, Radio and Machine Workers of America (UE) could no longer represent workers at a local employer because the local union had not filed the required non-communist oaths. It was the first time the board had revoked representation rights. The board also acted on a new issue. Some labor leaders had filed their non-communist affidavits in 1947, but others alleged that they joined the Communist Party after filing the oaths. The Herzog board voted to require any union leader so accused to reaffirm their oaths. But a federal district court enjoined the board from doing so in January 1953.

After becoming chair of the NLRB, Farmer laid out a plan for the board to take a more stringent line on the anti-communist oath issue. He also advocated new legislation to take the issue out of the hands of the NLRB and give it to an agency with greater investigative and prosecutorial authority so that the problem of communist control of labor unions could be more fully dealt with.

After Farmer joined the board, the NLRB issued three major new decisions regarding the anti-communist affidavits. These proved to be the last the board would issue. On October 17, 1953, The Farmer-led board issued a decision which revoked the representation rights of union whose officers had made false anti-communist oaths. Eight days later, the Farmer board announced it would not conduct representative elections for any union whose officers had been indicted for not filing or filing false anti-communist affidavits. Finally, on May 31, 1954, the Farmer board denied the protection of the NLRA to the International Fur & Leather Workers Union after its president, Ben Gold, was indicted for perjury for filing false anti-communist affidavits. It was the first time the NLRB had denied the protection of the law to an entire international union. Although a federal court enjoined the NLRB from disqualifying the Fur & Leather Workers in July 1954, another federal court upheld the NLRB's authority to question the veracity of anti-communist affidavits. This latter decision led the Farmer board to withdraw the protection of the act from a second international union, the International Union of Mine, Mill, and Smelter Workers. In April 1955, the Farmer board disqualified a third international union, the UE.

The Farmer board's activities in this area of the law were mixed. Administering the law cost the board $300,000 a year, a major part of its budget. (At the time, the chair of the NLRB only earned $15,000 a year.) The New York Times reported that most communist union leaders did not leave the labor movement but rather falsey took the oath, driving communist activities underground where they were more difficult to monitor. The act had created major problems for international unions whose leaders did not take the oath, however. In 1954, the Farmer board held in A. C. Lawrence Leather Co. that the existence of an unexpired contract was not a bar to holding a representation election where a local had broken away from a parent union because that parent union had been expelled from its labor federation for not filing the oath. This led many local unions to breakaway from and weaken unions like the Fur & Leather Workers, the U.S., and the Mine, Mill, and Smelter Workers.

The Farmer board's decisions proved to be the last the NLRB made on the anti-communist oath issue. Very quickly, the issue began to come before the U.S. Supreme Court. The Taft-Hartley oath controversy first reached the court in 'American Communications Association v. Douds, 339 U.S. 382 (1950), in which the court held 5-to-1 that the oath did not violate the First Amendment, was not an ex post facto law or bill of attainder in violation of Article One, Section 10, and was not a "test oath" in violation of Article Six. The issue again came before the court in Garner v. Board of Public Works, 341 U.S. 716 (1951), in which the court unanimously held that a municipal loyalty oath was not an ex post facto law or bill of attainder. It came before the court yet a third time in Wieman v. Updegraff, 344 U.S. 183 (1952). This time, the outcome was radically different. The Supreme Court unanimously ruled that a state loyalty oath legislation violated the due process clause of the Fourteenth Amendment. In 1965, the Supreme Court held 5-to-4 that the anti-communist oath was, in fact, a bill of attainder in United States v. Brown, 381 U.S. 437 (1965). The Supreme Court essentially overturned Douds, but did not formally do so.

== The "hot cargo" rulings and their legislative impact ==
The Farmer board's ruling in the area of "hot cargo" led to significant legislative changes in the NLRA by 1959.

Section 8(b)(4) of the Taft-Hartley Act forbade unions from putting economic pressure (such as a secondary boycott) on third party employers. A union could not, for example, picket an innocent third part to put pressure on the primary employer. But prior to the passage of Taft-Hartley, this was common, especially in industries (such as construction and trucking) where on-time delivery of goods was critical. Since the 1880s, many unions had negotiated "hot cargo clauses" in their collective bargaining agreements. These agreements permitted the union's members at the secondary employer to refuse to handle goods or provide services to the primary employer with whom the union had a dispute.

In 1949, the NLRB in Conway's Express held that the Taft-Hartley Act did not prohibit voluntary "hot cargo" agreements. The Farmer board reversed this ruling in McAllister Transfer Co. Farmer provided the critical vote in the case. He argued that although existing "hot cargo" clauses were valid, an employer could repudiate them at any time and not commit a breach of contract or a ULP. Although Farmer agreed with Beeson and Rodgers that the employer in McAllister Transfer had not committed a ULP in violating the voluntary "hot cargo" clause, he voiced the concern that the NLRB was becoming too activist by banning all such clauses.

The NLRB's conflicting rulings on "hot cargo" clauses led to national policy debates which were only resolved five years later. In 1959, Congress enacted the Labor Management Reporting and Disclosure Act, which banned even voluntary "hot cargo" clauses.

== Replacing the General Counsel ==
During Farmer's tenure on the NLRB, a major controversy broke out over who should be NLRB General Counsel.

Conservative attorney and NLRB trial examiner Robert N. Denham was appointed General Counsel of the NLRB by President Harry S. Truman on July 17, 1947. Denham clashed repeatedly with the board members on a wide range of issues. When he began refusing to sign legal briefs submitted to him by the board, the board had its own solicitor sign and submit them. Although it was unclear whether, under the Taft-Hartley Act, President Truman had the authority to fire Denham (the act was silent on the issue), the administration resolved to do so. Denham voluntarily resigned on September 16, 1950 (10 months early). George J. Bott, a former regional director and current associate general counsel, was appointed to the position on September 28.

Dwight D. Eisenhower was elected president in November 1952, and in August 1953 his advisors began strategizing ways to force Bott's resignation so that a new General Counsel could be confirmed by the Republican-controlled Senate prior to the November 1954 mid-term elections. When White House Chief of Staff Sherman Adams let Bott know in March 1954 that the administration wanted him out, Bott refused to resign and threatened to sue if he was fired. The administration did not force the issue at that time, since it had not settled on a replacement. The early favorite was NLRB member Philip Ray Rodgers, and his candidacy was pushed by Secretary of Commerce Sinclair Weeks and Senator William F. Knowland (R-CA). The New York Times reported on June 24, 1954, that Rodgers was the administration's choice to replace Bott. But liberal Republicans within the administration opposed Rodgers, and fought for their own candidate. Two months later, Eisenhower announced that his choice for General Counsel was, instead, Theopil C. Kammholz. The administration actually nominated Kammholz in August 1954, but opposition from Senators James E. Murray (D-MT) and Herbert H. Lehman (D-NY) opposed him and the Senate Labor Committee did not act on the nomination.

Eisenhower renominated Kammholz on November 9, 1954. But again the Senate Labor Committee did not act on the nomination. Bott's term of office expired on December 21, 1954, and by late February no replacement had been confirmed by the Senate. More than 1,300 ULPs charges had gone unaddressed due to the vacancy. The committee had seemingly failed to act in anticipation of heavy opposition to the nomination from organized labor and its friends in the Senate, but this never materialized. The Labor Committee approved the Kammholz nomination by voice vote on February 25, 1955, and the Senate approved the nomination by voice vote on March 8.

Kammholz held views very similar to Farmer's. Kammholz said the NLRA's purpose was to protect individual worker's rights, not the rights or collectives like labor unions. Like Farmer, he emphasized that the role of the NLRB was to prevent "big labor" from intimidating individuals. Like Farmer, he also believed the NLRB staff had little experience in the workplace and was prejudiced against employers.

== Later life ==
=== Resignation from the NLRB ===
Farmer came under significant criticism from organized labor for tilting the NLRB against worker rights. Senator Hubert Humphrey (D-MN) charged Farmer was leading an NLRB "packed" with anti-union members, and organized labor felt the Farmer board was restrictively interpreting the Taft-Hartley Act and creating an anti-labor labor policy. Abe Murdoch and Ivar Peterson publicly voiced their disapproval of the conservative majority's rulings as well. Farmer defended his leadership of the board by saying, "Our decisions evolve from long hours of study on the part of each board member and his staff and are distilled from the crucible of full and free discussion among all board members." Although he conceded that sometimes NLRB came to the wrong decision, he argued that the board was, on the whole, fair and conscientious in doing its duty.

Nonetheless, Farmer was unhappy at the NLRB. His pay at the board was a third what he had made in private practice. In May 1955, he told Sherman Adams that he did not want to be reappointed. Farmer's departure sparked another battle between liberals and conservatives within the Eisenhower administration. Secretary of Commerce Weeks supported Philip Ray Rodgers for the chair slot, while Secretary of Labor Mitchell did not. Among those conservatives wished to appoint to the board if Rodgers became chair were Michael J. Bernstein, counsel to the Senate Labor Committee; Dwyer W. Shugrue, labor aide for liberal Republican Senator Irving Ives; and Edward A. McCabe, counsel to the House Committee on Education and labor. Mitchell asked Farmer to stay on the board, but Farmer declined. When Farmer's retirement was made public on May 25, Rodgers was reported to be the leading candidate to replace him. In July, Mitchell was reported to be backing Labor Department Solicitor General Stuart Rothman for the post.

In mid-July, Mitchell said a candidate to replace Farmer would be sent to the Senate before its August recess. But no nomination was made. Weeks continued to back Rothman, but conservative Republicans in the Senate signalled that they were opposed to him. Weeks also floated the name of Rocco Siciliano, assistant secretary of labor and a former member of the NLRB legal staff. But Mitchell was able to convince Eisenhower to reject Bernstein and McCabe. With almost no one willing to accept a recess appointment, the nomination remained unmade. Farmer resigned from the NLRB on August 19, 1955, eight days before his term was due to end. Philip Ray Rodgers was appointed acting board chair.

In early November 1955, Senator Howard Alexander Smith (R-NJ) warned the Eisenhower administration that the NLRB was deadlocked two-to-two, and that this prevented the Republican members of the NLRB from overturning the labor policies of the Roosevelt and Truman administrations. Finally moved to action, Eisenhower appointed NLRB member Boyd Leedom chair of the NLRB on November 18, 1955. Leedom was nominated to the board in mid-February 1955 to succeed Albert Beeson, whose term expired on December 16, 1954. His nomination was approved by the Senate on February 25 after no opposition. To replace Leedom, Eisenhower named NLRB trial examiner Stephen S. Bean.

The Leedom board continued to implement a conservative agenda at the NLRB, although more slowly and with less publicity.

=== Later career and BCOA involvement ===
When Farmer returned to private practice, he became a partner with Steptoe & Johnson again.

Farmer continued to be active in national labor relations policy, however. In 1957, Eisenhower appointed Farmer to a board of inquiry looking into the causes of a strike at the Goodyear Atomic Corporation plant in Waverly, Ohio. In January 1959, Farmer was appointed to a nine-member advisory committee on labor law reform. The advisory committee was a project of Senator John F. Kennedy (D-MA), a member of the Senate Labor Committee. Kennedy was a member of the United States Senate Select Committee on Improper Activities in Labor and Management, which formed on January 30, 1957, and was investigating corruption in labor unions. In 1958, Senators Kennedy and Ives co-sponsored a comprehensive labor law reform bill. Although it passed the Senate, it died in the House. Kennedy's advisory committee was established to help craft a new bill more acceptable to Republicans. The Kennedy bill was significantly amended and merged with a House bill to form the Labor Management Reporting and Disclosure Act, which was enacted on September 14, 1959. In October 1959, Eisenhower appointed Farmer to a three-man fact-finding panel investigating a strike by the International Longshoremen's Association which had shut down ports all along the East Coast of the United States. The panel was set up under provisions of the Taft-Hartley Act which provided for an injunction to bring an end to a strike if warranted by national security or economic necessity. Eisenhower accepted the Farmer panel report on October 7, and immediately sought an injunction to end the strike.

Farmer became legal counsel and a negotiator for the Bituminous Coal Operators Association (BCOA) in 1969. Over time, he became chief negotiator for the group of coal mine owners, and negotiates seven national contracts for them.

In 1960, Farmer left Steptoe & Johnson and formed his own law firm, Patterson Belknap & Farmer. From 1960 to 1974, it had a client referral agreement with the New York City firm of Patterson Belknap (hence the name). D.C. attorney Raymond N. Shibley became a partner in the firm, and it changed its name to Patterson, Belknap, Farmer & Shibley. The firm dissolved in 1980.

Farmer's influence among business leaders was such that in 1966, he, Gerard Reilly (a former NLRB member), and Theodore Iserman (an attorney for the Chrysler corporation who helped draft the Taft-Hartley Act) were commissioned by the Labor Law Study Group to advise the business community on national labor law reforms to pursue. The Labor Law Study Group was formed in the early 1960s by about 35 national corporations to assist large businesses in understanding labor relations, overcoming the policy and public relations successes of labor unions, and working toward labor law reform. Farmer, Reilly, and Iserman issued their report in 1970.

Farmer twice served as president of the BCOA. He was first named president in 1969, when George L. Judy resigned unexpectedly. Joseph Moody was appointed president shortly thereafter. Farmer's second tenure as president came when Moody retired as planned on January 8, 1973. Farmer served for nearly two years before being replaced by Walter C. Wallace in January 1975.

In 1970, Farmer testified in United States Senate hearings regarding improprieties in a United Mine Workers (UMW) pension scheme. The UMW was led by W. A. "Tony" Boyle, who was elected union president in 1963. Well known as a bare-knuckle negotiator, the autocratic Boyle also did not shrink from using physical intimidation within the union to get his way. Boyle was challenged for the presidency in 1969 by Joseph "Jock" Yablonski. In an election widely seen as corrupt, Yablonski lost the election. He, his wife, and his adult daughter were murdered in their home on December 31, 1959. That same year, Boyle forced a 30 percent increase in miner pension benefits through the three-person board of trustees of the UMW Welfare and Retirement Fund. A unanimous vote by Boyle, George Judy, and public trustee Josephine Roche was required to approve the increase, which came just before the 1969 UMW election. Yablonski had challenged the timeliness of the increase as "vote buying", and BCOA members were angry that their pension contributions had jumped without notice or negotiation. Boyle defended the increase by saying that Judy and Roche also approved the increase. But Roche was hospitalized at the time of the vote. Judy claimed to have a proxy vote given to him by Roche. Farmer was called as a witness by a special Senate Labor and Pensions subcommittee, and verified to some degree Judy's claims to have a proxy. Roche denied ever giving him a proxy. The conflicting testimony did not result in perjury charges or a rescinding of the pension increase. But Judy's 1969 resignation, the press reported, was due to BCOA anger over the pension increase. Boyle was found guilty of hiring Yablonski's murderers in April 1974 and sentenced to life in prison.

In the 1970s, Farmer became chief negotiator for the BCOA. He helped quell a wildcat strike in 1971, and was deeply involved in negotiations for the Bituminous Coal Strike of 1974.

=== Death ===
Guy Farmer continued to live in Washington, D.C., after leaving the NLRB and retiring as chief negotiator for the BCOA. He suffered a stroke, and died on October 4, 1995, at Sibley Memorial Hospital. He was interred at Rock Creek Cemetery in Washington.

== Personal life ==
About 1936, Farmer married Rose Marie Smith of Hamlin, West Virginia. Her father, Jacob. D. Smith, was a noted local attorney and public prosecutor. The couple had one child, Guy Otto Farmer Jr., born in 1941. Their marriage ended in divorce.

Farmer remarried around 1949 or 1950. His second wife, Helen Marie Joura Farmer, was a noted investment advisor in D.C. The couple had three children: Mary Katherine, Mark Mallory, and Jane Meredith. Helen Farmer, an Iowa Hall of Fame member, died of cancer in January 1974.

Guy Farmer was a member of the Cosmos Club, an exclusive private club in Washington, D.C. He appeared in Harlan County, USA, Barbara Kopple's 1976 Oscar-winning documentary movie about the "Harlan County war" (a bitter coal strike in Kentucky).

== Bibliography ==
- The American Bar. Minneapolis, Minn.: J.C. Fifield Co., 1962.
- Chamberlain, Neil Wolverton. Sourcebook of Labor. New York: Mc Graw-Hill, 1958.
- Christianson, Stephen G. Facts About the Congress. New York: Wilson, 1996.
- Current Biography. Bronx, N.Y.: H.W. Wilson Co., 1956.
- Fischer, Robert J. and Janoski, Richard. Loss Prevention and Security Procedures: Practical Applications for Contemporary Problems. Oxford, U.K.: Butterworth-Heinemann, 1999.
- Halpern, Martin. UAW Politics in the Cold War Era. Albany, N.Y.: State University of New York Press, 1988.
- Jacoby, Sanford. Modern Manors: Welfare Capitalism Since the New Deal. Princeton, N.J.: Princeton University Press, 1999.
- James, Ralph C. and James, Estelle. Hoffa and the Teamsters: A Study of Union Power. Princeton, N.J.: Van Nostrand, 1965.
- Krug, Mary Ellen and Gammer, Michele A. "Should Representation Elections Be Governed By Principles Or Expediency?" Seattle University Law Review. 9:469 (1986).
- Lichtenstein, Nelson. "Politicized Unions and the New Deal Model: Labor, Business, and Taft-Hartley." In The New Deal and the Triumph of Liberalism. Sidney M. Milkis, ed. Amherst, Mass.: University of Massachusetts Press, 2002.
- Mackenzie, G. Calvin. The Politics of Presidential Appointments. New York, N.Y.: Free Press, 1981.
- The McClellan Committee Hearings, 1957. Arlington, Va.: Bureau of National Affairs, 1958.
- McGuiness, Kenneth C. The New Frontier NLRB. Washington, D.C.: Labor Policy Association, 1963.
- Modern Federal Practice Digest: All Federal Case Law in the Modern Era. Vol. 35. St. Paul, Minn.: West Publishing Co., 1970.
- Oberer, Walter E.; Hanslowe, Kurt L.; and Heinsz, Timothy J. Cases and Materials on Labor Law: Collective Bargaining in a Free Society. St. Paul, Minn.: West Publishing Co., 1994.
- O'Brien, Michael. John F. Kennedy: A Biography. New York: Macmillan, 2006.
- Pier, Carol. Discounting Rights: Wal-Mart's Violation of US Workers' Right to Freedom of Association. Washington, D.C.: Human Rights Watch, 2007.
- Rabinowitz, Victor. Unrepentant Leftist: A Lawyer's Memoir. Urbana, Ill.: University of Illinois Press, 1996.
- Reilly, Gerard. "A Return to Legislative Intent." Georgetown Law Review. 46:373 (March 1955).
- Scher, Seymour. "Regulatory Agency Control Through Appointment: The Case of the Eisenhower Administration and the NLRB." Journal of Politics. 23:4 (December 1961).
- Witney, Fred. Wartime Experiences of the National Labor Relations Board, 1941-1945. Chicago: University of Illinois Press, 1949.
