= Vincent Dougherty =

Biographical details
- Born: Scranton, Pennsylvania, U.S.
- Died: January 4, 1989 (aged 72); Brockton, Massachusetts, U.S.
- Education: College of the Holy Cross; Georgetown Law School

Playing career
- 1934–1936: Holy Cross

Administrative career (AD unless noted)
- 1966–1972: Holy Cross

Vincent G. Dougherty (1916 – January 4, 1989) was an American career special agent of the FBI and, after his retirement, college athletics administrator who served as athletic director at the College of the Holy Cross from 1966 to 1972.

== Early life ==
Dougherty was born in Scranton, Pennsylvania, where he was an outstanding football player and state diving champion. He played halfback, holder, and punter for the Holy Cross Crusaders football team and was a member of the undefeated 1935 squad. After graduating from Holy Cross, Dougherty attended Georgetown Law School. He graduated in 1940 and joined the Federal Bureau of Investigation. Although he was exempt from military service during World War II, he enlisted in the United States Marine Corps. He served as a first lieutenant in the Marine Corps Intelligence in China and the South Pacific. He resumed his career with the FBI after the war, retiring as the agent in charge of the Scranton office in 1966.

== Holy Cross ==
On December 29, 1965, it was announced that Dougherty would succeed Gene Flynn as Holy Cross' athletic director on July 1, 1966. In 1969, Dougherty led the athletic department through a Hepatitis outbreak that infected 90 of the football team's 97 players, coaches, and staff. Dougherty and coach Bill Whitton made the decision to cancel the remainder of the 1969 season. He also dealt with staff changes, a restricted budget, and outdated athletic facilities. On December 15, 1971, he gave his resignation to school president John E. Brooks effective June 30, 1972.

== Later life ==
In 1974, Massachusetts Attorney General Robert H. Quinn made Dougherty the chief supervisor of the Massachusetts Bureau of Special Investigations' welfare fraud unit. He retired in 1982 following a stroke. He spent his later years in Sandwich, Massachusetts and died on January 4, 1989, at the Brockton VA Medical Center from Alzheimer's disease. He was 72 years old.
