= Joseph McCabe (disambiguation) =

Joseph McCabe (1867–1955) was an English writer and speaker on the subject of rationalism and atheism.

Joseph McCabe may also refer to:

- Joseph McCabe (hunter) (1816–1865), South African hunter, trader, explorer and botanical collector
- Joe McCabe (hurler) (1919–2019), Irish hurler
- Joe McCabe (baseball) (born 1938), American baseball player
- Joseph McCabe (editor) (born 1972), print and online journalist and editor
