= John McCabe =

John McCabe may refer to:

- John McCabe (composer) (1939–2015), British composer and classical pianist
- John McCabe (writer) (1920–2005), Shakespearean scholar and biographer
- Christopher John McCabe (born 1967), British biologist and novelist who writes as John McCabe
- John F. McCabe (born 1958), American judge on the D.C. Superior Court
- John Ignatius McCabe (1926–2001), Roman Catholic priest and theologian under the name Herbert McCabe
- John J. McCabe (1954–1969), murdered after attending a Knights of Columbus dance in Lowell, Massachusetts
