= Jack Barry (baseball) =

American baseball player and manager (1887–1961)

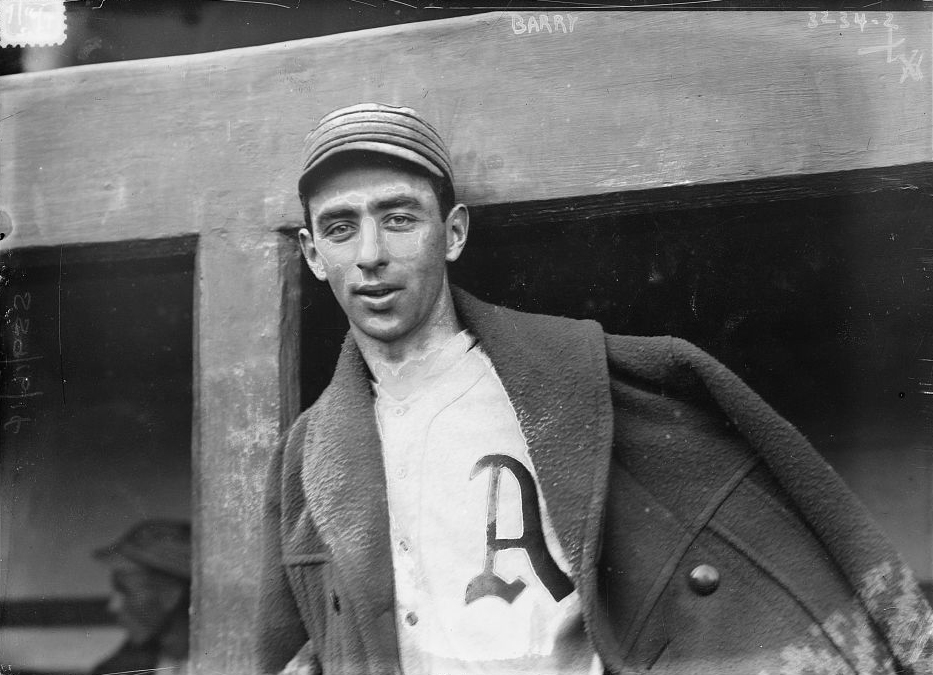
- Jack Barry in 1913.
- Shortstop / Second baseman / Manager
- Born: April 26, 1887; Meriden, Connecticut, U.S.
- Died: April 23, 1961 (aged 73); Shrewsbury, Massachusetts, U.S.
- Batted: Right Threw: Right

MLB debut
- July 13, 1908, for the Philadelphia Athletics

Last MLB appearance
- June 23, 1919, for the Boston Red Sox

MLB statistics
- Batting average: .243
- Home runs: 10
- Runs batted in: 532
- Stolen bases: 153
- Managerial record: 90–62
- Winning %: .592
- Stats at Baseball Reference

Teams
- As player: Philadelphia Athletics (1908–1915); Boston Red Sox (1915–1919); As manager: Boston Red Sox (1917)

Career highlights and awards
- 6× AL pennant winner (1910, 1911, 1913–1916); 5× World Series champion (1910, 1911, 1913, 1915, 1916)

Member of the College

Baseball Hall of Fame
- Induction: 2007

John Joseph Barry (April 26, 1887 – April 23, 1961) was an American shortstop, second baseman, and manager in Major League Baseball, and later a college baseball coach. From 1908 through 1919, Barry played for the Philadelphia Athletics (1908–1915) and Boston Red Sox (1915–1919).

== Philadelphia Athletics ==
Born in Meriden, Connecticut, Barry spent his nearly entire tenure in the big leagues on winning teams, first the Philadelphia Athletics and later the Boston Red Sox. Athletics manager Connie Mack signed Barry off the campus of the College of the Holy Cross to play shortstop on what would become his famous $100,000 infield. The unit, one of the most famous groups of teammates in baseball history, consisted of first baseman Stuffy McInnis, second baseman Eddie Collins, and third baseman Frank Baker. The group was critical to the Athletics winning the American League pennant in 1910, 1911, 1913 and 1914, and World Championships in 1910, 1911, and 1913.

== Boston Red Sox ==
In 1915, the year after the Boston Braves swept the Athletics in the World Series, Red Sox owner Joe Lannin paid $8,000 for Barry's services, as Mack was dismantling the team. Upon joining the Red Sox, he hit just .262 but played reliable defense at shortstop, proving to be the last piece of the puzzle in what was to be another pennant-winning team. He played in the World Series in 1915 and 1916 for the Red Sox. Acknowledged as the team's on-field leader, he became a player-manager in 1917, leading the team to a 90-win season and a second-place finish to the Chicago White Sox. In the war year of 1917, manager Jack Barry chose to enlist and on October 18, 1917, Jack and four other Red Sox players, who had enlisted as yeomen in the naval reserve, were called to active duty and ordered to report for duty on November 3, 1917. He served all of 1918 in the military. After poor play in 1919, he decided to retire rather than be sold away in another fire sale following Harry Frazee's decision to sell his shortstop back to the Athletics.

In an 11-season career, Barry posted a .243 batting average with 10 home runs and 429 RBI in 1223 games.

=== Managerial record ===
Team	Year	Regular season					Postseason			
Team	Year	Games	Won	Lost	Win %	Finish	Won	Lost	Win %	Result
BOS	1917	152	90	62	.592	2nd in AL	–	–	–	–
Total		152	90	62	.592		0	0	–	

== Holy Cross ==
Barry became the head coach at Holy Cross in 1921, and continued in that position for 40 years until his death in Shrewsbury, Massachusetts at age 73. During his tenure, he posted the highest career winning percentage (.806) in collegiate history, and won the 1952 College World Series. He was among the initial class of inductees to the American Baseball Coaches Association Hall of Fame in 1966. In 2007, he was an inaugural veteran inductee of the College Baseball Hall of Fame along with Lou Gehrig, Christy Mathewson, and Joe Sewell. In 1943 he became Holy Cross' acting athletic following the death of Tom McCabe and remained in that role until Gene Flynn returned from the United States Army in 1946.

== See also ==
- List of Major League Baseball player–managers
- List of baseball players who went directly to Major League Baseball
