= Kevin McCabe =

Kevin McCabe may refer to:

- Kevin McCabe (businessman) (born 1948), English property businessman
- Kevin McCabe (economist), American economist
- Kevin McCabe (Gaelic footballer) (born 1960), Northern Irish Gaelic footballer
- Kevin McCabe (banjoist), American musician
- Kevin McCabe (American football) (born 1984), American football player
- Kevin J. McCabe (born 1958 or 1959), Alaska state representative
