= Bill McCabe =

Bill McCabe may refer to:

- Bill McCabe (Australian sportsman) (1935–2023), North Melbourne footballer and water polo international
- Bill McCabe (baseball) (1892–1966), Chicago Cubs and Brooklyn Robins player
- Bill McCabe (footballer, born 1908) (1908–1945), Australian rules footballer

== See also ==
- William McCabe (disambiguation)
