= Captive audience meeting =

Union busting tactic

A captive audience meeting is a mandatory meeting during working hours, organized by an employer with the purpose of discouraging employees from organizing, joining, or forming a labor union. It is considered a union-busting tactic. Employees may be subject to discipline, including dismissal, for failing to attend the meeting or for asking questions.

In the United States, captive audience meetings were broadly permitted from 1948 until 2024 by the National Labor Relations Board (NLRB). In November 2024, the NLRB decided that mandatory meetings violate the National Labor Relations Act but that voluntary meetings about unionization are permissible under a set of conditions. In May 2026, the new NLRB general counsel called for a reversal of the decision, and Amazon also filed a lawsuit challenging the decision.

Employers defend the practice as free speech and assisting workers' freedom of choice through a marketplace of ideas; critics view the practice as an infringement on workers' rights not to listen and freedom of association and allege that captive audience meetings are used to intimidate workers and spread misinformation.

A 2011 review found that captive audience meetings were allowed in Turkey. The same review found that captive audience meetings were disallowed in Argentina, Brazil, Germany, Japan, New Zealand, Spain, and some Canadian provinces.

== Characteristics ==
Key characteristics of captive audience meetings are their mandatory nature, their occurrence during working hours, and a one-sided message where union organizers are not given equal access to employees' time. It is a union-busting tactic. The meetings can be group meetings, but they can be a series of one-on-one meetings as well. During captive audience meetings, employees often are not allowed to ask questions or indicate they disagree with the messaging. Employees who fail to attend might be fired, and those asking questions disciplined.

The talking points during these meetings can be organized by union avoidance consultants, who deliver these as part of an "anti-union toolkit". Labor historian Kate Bronfenbrenner describes that the conveyed information often contains "misinformation" and "distortions". While captive audience meetings are frequently held for anti-union messaging, some meetings instead convey the employer's opinion on religion or other political issues.

Captive audience meetings are held in about 90% of US labor elections as of 2009; union win rates are inversely correlated with the number of captive audience meetings held.

== United States ==
=== Legal status ===
==== 1940s and 1950s ====
J. Warren Madden, the NLRB's first chair, issued rulings which required employers to remain neutral during union organizing campaigns and elections. The Supreme Court disagreed, however, and said in NLRB v. Virginia Electric & Power Co. (1941) that employers could express their opinion about unions so long as that speech was not coercive. The NLRB subsequently held employer speech was not coercive unless blatantly so or part of a broad pattern of coercive conduct.

But captive audience meetings, a majority of the board felt, were different. After NLRB v. Virginia Electric & Power Co., the NLRB continued to issue rulings that held that captive audience meetings were a per se violation of the National Labor Relations Act. In 1947, a Republican Congress passed the Taft–Hartley Act to reduce the power of unions. It states that employers and unions can express opinions on unions, as long as they made no "threat of reprisal or force or promise of benefit". The NLRB interpreted this element of the law as permitting captive audience meetings.

During the tenure of chair Paul M. Herzog, the NLRB continued to issue a series of rulings which held that unions should be granted equal time whenever an employer held a captive audience meeting. These rulings became known as the Bonwit Teller doctrine. In 1953, the chair of the NLRB Guy Otto Farmer convinced Democratic appointee Ivar Peterson to join Farmer and Rodgers in deciding Livingston Shirt Corp., which overturned Bonwit Teller. Although Peterson agreed with the outcome of the decision, his rationale for reaching the verdict was on much narrower legal grounds.

Farmer did not, however, find the employer's right to hold captive audience meetings absolute. In Peerless Plywood Co. Farmer, Rodgers, and Peterson agreed that employers may not hold captive audience meetings within 24 hours of a union representation election. Two years later, in Economic Machinery Co., Farmer led a unanimous board in holding that any one-on-one conversation between the employer and employee about the union is inherently coercive.

==== 21st century ====
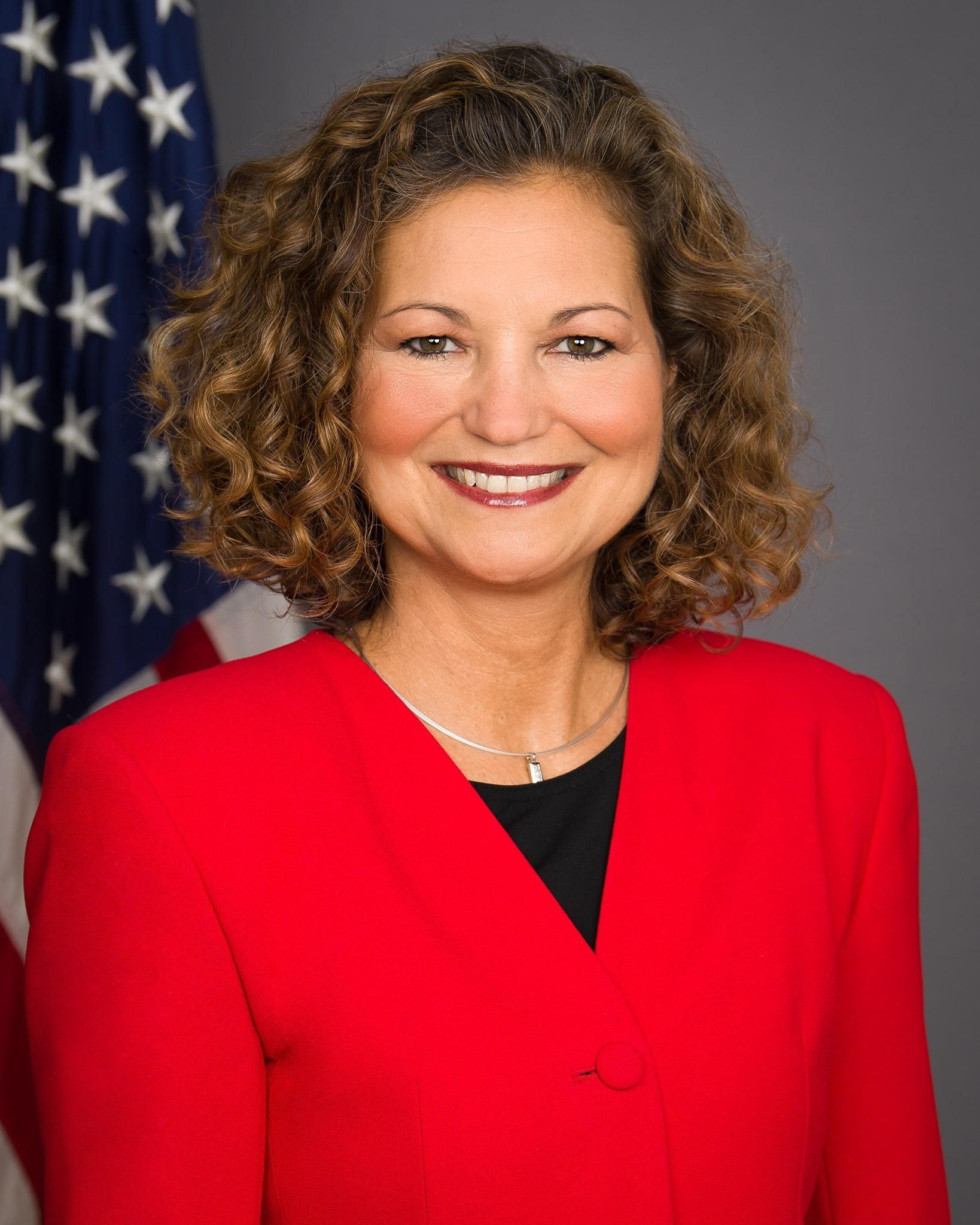
Jennifer Abruzzo, general counsel of the NLRB during the Biden administration

In February 2021, the Protecting the Right to Organize Act ("PRO Act") was proposed in the U.S. House of Representatives. Among other things, the PRO Act would have made captive audience meetings illegal as an "unfair labor practice". In April 2022, Jennifer Abruzzo, general counsel of the NLRB, issued a memorandum calling for the board to find captive audience meetings unlawful.

In November 2024, under the Biden administration, the U.S. National Labor Relations Board (NLRB) issued a decision in Amazon.com Services LLC 373 NLRB No. 136 (2024) that mandatory meetings violate the National Labor Relations Act, but that employer-organized meetings about unionization are permissible with advance notice, provided that attendance is optional, employees face no adverse consequences for not attending, and no attendance records are kept. Under the second Trump administration, the new general counsel of the NLRB, Crystal Carey, called for a reversal of the ban. In May 2026, Amazon asked a panel of the 11th circuit court to overturn the ban.

In addition to the 2024 NLRB decision, 14 US states have laws that either ban captive audience meetings outright or prohibit employers from penalizing workers in any way for skipping such meetings. These are Alaska, California, Connecticut, Hawaii, Illinois, Maine, Maryland, Minnesota, New Jersey, New York, Oregon, Rhode Island, Vermont, and Washington.

=== Legal principles ===
Various legal principles are noted in the discussion of captive audience meetings: freedom of speech, freedom of thought (including the freedom not to listen), and freedom of association. In the United States, freedom of association is protected under Section 7 of the National Labor Relations Act, which upholds employees' freedom to join or not to join a union. Section 8(a)(1) prohibits acts by the employer that interfere with these rights. Section 8(c) protects employer's free speech, stating that expressing opinions is protected as long as they include no "threat of reprisal". In its decision to ban captive audience meetings, the NLRB argued that employers forcing employees to listen to them is coercive conduct not allowed under Section 8(a)(1). Furthermore, it argued that the First Amendment would protect both the right to express opinions and the right not to listen to those opinions.

== Other countries ==
A 2011 review found that captive audience meetings were illegal in Argentina, Brazil, Germany, Japan, New Zealand, Spain, and some Canadian provinces, but allowed in Turkey. Additionally, in most of these countries, captive audience meetings were simply 'not done', and the issue had not become a topic of court decisions. Every EU country has ratified International Labour Organization core conventions C087 Freedom of Association, and C098 Right to Organise and Collective Bargaining, and captive audience meetings are at odds with these conventions.

In Germany, captive audience meetings would conflict with the constitution, which includes protections for "freedom of thought and expression". In Argentina, the prohibition stems from the American Declaration of the Rights and Duties of Man. In New Zealand, the legal reason to prohibit captive audience meetings was in part derived from common law, which distinguishes between "service and servility". In Spain, any interference from employers in union formation, including non-mandatory meetings, is illegal.

== See also ==
- History of union busting in the United States
