= Peter B. Robb =

American lawyer (born 1948)

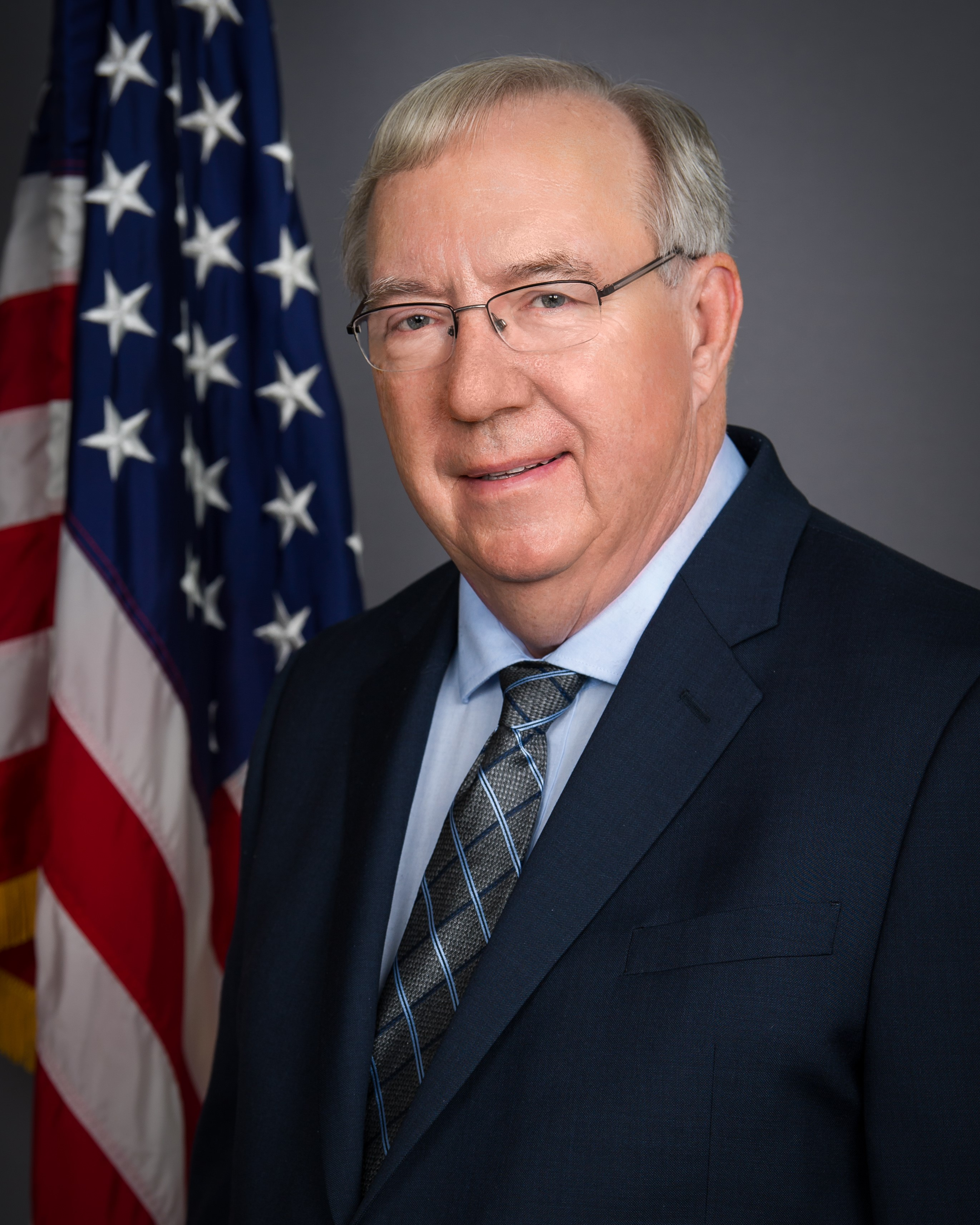
- Official portrait, 2018

General Counsel of the National Labor Relations Board
- In office November 17, 2017 – January 20, 2021
- President: Donald Trump
- Preceded by: Richard Griffin
- Succeeded by: Jennifer Abruzzo

Personal details
- Born: Peter Barr Robb; January 24, 1948 (age 77)
- Education: Georgetown University (BA); University of Maryland, Baltimore (JD)

Peter Barr Robb (born January 24, 1948) is an American lawyer who was the general counsel of the National Labor Relations Board (NLRB). He was appointed to the position by President Donald Trump. He was fired by President Joe Biden on January 20, 2021, after he refused to resign. According to his critics, Robb has advanced pro-business and anti-labor causes both in and out of government.

As general counsel to the NLRB, Robb recommended that Uber drivers should be considered contractors rather than employees and therefore not be protected by federal labor law.

Prior to his role as general counsel, he worked for the Reagan administration in litigation against the Professional Air Traffic Controllers Organization, the union whose workers went on strike in 1981.

Robb later was the director of labor and employment at the law firm Downs Rachlin Martin. Prior to that, he served as special labor counsel to Proskauer Rose, where he represented several companies and organizations against their workers. He also served as chief counsel to NLRB member Robert Hunter.

Robb is the first general counsel of the NLRB to ever to be fired by a president. (President Harry S. Truman, in 1950 requested and received the resignation of the then-NLRB general counsel, Robert N. Denham.) Republicans and business interests decried Robb's firing, while Democrats and labor unions supported it. Some of the controversy stemmed from the NLRB's status as an independent agency, defined as an agency that is intended to be insulated from executive control, usually because the President's power to dismiss the members is limited.
