= Patrick McCabe =

Patrick McCabe or Pat McCabe may refer to:

- Patrick E. McCabe (1860–1931), clerk of the New York State Senate
- Patrick McCabe (Irish republican) (1916–1971), member of the Irish Republican Army
- Patrick McCabe (novelist) (born 1955), Irish novelist
- Pat McCabe (lacrosse) (born 1969), American lacrosse player
- Pat McCabe (rugby union) (born 1988), Australian rugby union player
- Patrick McCabe (sprinter), winner of the 1982 distance medley relay at the NCAA Division I Indoor Track and Field Championships
