= Cabe =

Cabe or CABE may refer to:

- Cabe (river), a tributary of the Sil River in Spain
- CABE, the Chartered Association of Building Engineers, professional body for building engineers in the UK and overseas established in 1925
- CABE, the Commission for Architecture and the Built Environment, body of the UK government from 1999 to 2011
- CABE, Central Advisory Board of Education, government board in India which prepared the draft bill for the Right of Children to Free and Compulsory Education Act, 2009

== Surname ==
Cabe is a reduced form of the surname MacCabe. People with that name include:

Real people

- Gloria Cabe (born 1941), American politician and political advisor

Fictional characters

- Bethany Cabe, in the Marvel comics Iron Man
- Joshua Cabe, in the 1972 western The Daughters of Joshua Cabe
