= Jennifer Abruzzo =

American government official

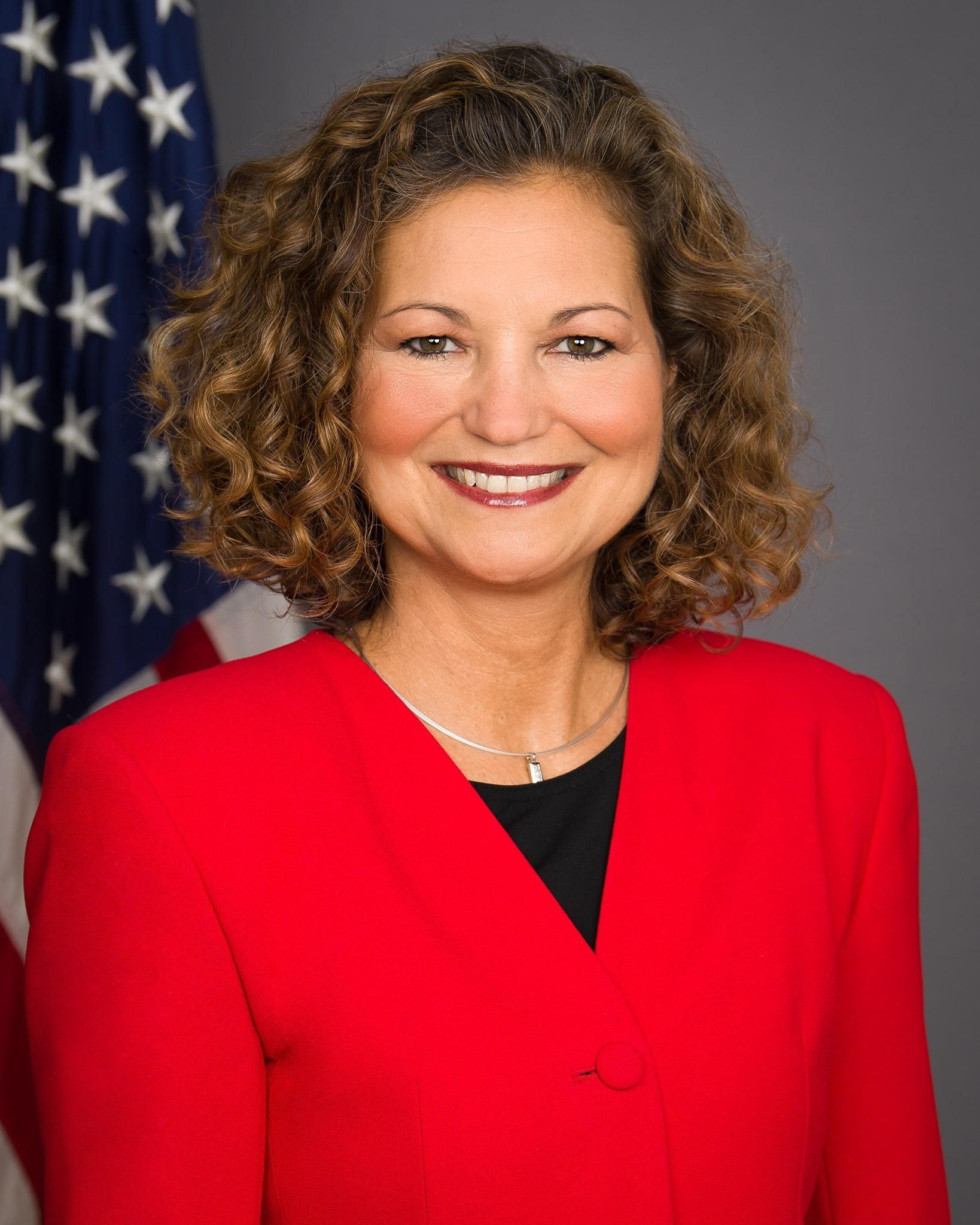

General Counsel of the National Labor Relations Board
- In office July 22, 2021 – January 27, 2025
- President: Joe Biden; Donald Trump
- Preceded by: Peter B. Robb
- Succeeded by: Crystal Carey

Personal details
- Born: Jennifer Ann Abruzzo
- Party: Democratic
- Education: Binghamton University; Stony Brook University (BS); University of Miami (JD)

Jennifer Ann Abruzzo is an American attorney and former government official who served as General Counsel at the National Labor Relations Board (NLRB) from 2021 to 2025. She previously was Special Counsel for Strategic Initiatives for Communications Workers of America (CWA), the largest media and communications union in the United States. She had previously worked for the NLRB for over 20 years in a number of positions, including Deputy General Counsel and Acting General Counsel.

She was nominated to the NLRB by President Joe Biden in 2021 and confirmed by the Senate. During her tenure, she pushed for a broadening of workers' rights. Shortly after Donald Trump took office as President in January 2025, he fired her.

== Early life and career ==
Jennifer Ann Abruzzo was born Queens, New York City and raised in Jackson Heights. Abruzzo was raised in a "large Roman Catholic family". Abruzzo began her nearly 23-year career at the National Labor Relations Board (NLRB) as a field attorney in Miami, eventually rising to the position of Deputy General Counsel during the Obama administration. Abruzzo later served as acting general counsel in advance of the confirmation of Peter B. Robb to the position.

Abruzzo became special counsel for strategic initiatives at Communications Workers of America (CWA) in February 2018. In 2019, the AFL–CIO recommended Abruzzo for a vacant Democratic seat on the NLRB. During the presidential transition of Joe Biden, she served as an advisor to the President-elect on matters of labor policy.

== General Counsel of the National Labor Relations Board ==
=== Nomination ===
President Joe Biden nominated Jennifer Abruzzo to become the General Counsel of the NLRB on February 17, 2021 after firing the previous General Counsel, Peter B. Robb. Following her confirmation hearing, Abruzzo was confirmed by the Senate in a 51-50 vote, with all Democrats voting in favor and all Republicans voting against, and Vice President Kamala Harris breaking the tie in favor of Abruzzo's confirmation. She is the second woman to ever serve as NLRB general counsel, after Rosemary M. Collyer.

The confirmation of Abruzzo received support from unions, and she is expected to improve the investigative and enforcement capacity of NLRB lawyers by reversing budget cuts and staffing reductions implemented during the tenure of her predecessor, as well as ratify actions taken by acting general counsel Peter Sung Ohr after Robb was fired.

=== Tenure ===
As General Counsel, Abruzzo issued a memo declaring that college athletes have the right to organize. In office, Abruzzo has pushed for the NLRB to protect immigrants' rights to organize, regardless of their immigration status. In October 2021, Abruzzo stated that employees who participated in Black Lives Matter protests were protected under federal labor law. The success of the Amazon Labor Union organizing drive at the company's JFK8 facility in Staten Island, New York has been attributed in part to Abruzzo's leadership at the NLRB.

In April 2022, Abruzzo issued a memorandum calling for the NLRB to find captive audience meetings unlawful.

General Counsel Abruzzo notified Regional Offices in May of 2023 that non-compete clauses should generally be considered unlawful.

=== Termination ===
On January 27, 2025, Bloomberg News reported that Abruzzo had been fired by email.

=== Subsequent career ===
In April 2025, Abruzzo joined the California law firm of Bush Gottlieb as Of Counsel. She also returned to CWA as a Senior Advisor to President.
