= Edward McCabe =

Edward McCabe may refer to:

- Edward P. McCabe (1850–1920), American politician
- Edward MacCabe (1816–1885), Cardinal of Dublin
- Edward A. McCabe (1917–2008), aide to President Dwight Eisenhower
- Ed McCabe, American businessman
