= Thomas McCabe =

Thomas McCabe may refer to:

- Thomas McCabe (United Irishmen) (1739–1820), Irish revolutionary
- Thomas B. McCabe (1893–1982), American businessman, former Federal Reserve Chairman
- Tom McCabe (footballer) (born 1933), New Zealand soccer player
- Tom McCabe (politician) (1954–2015), Scottish Labour Party politician
- Tommy McCabe (born 1998), American soccer player
- Tom McCabe (rugby) (born 1965), Irish Irish amateur rugby union, rugby league and GAA footballer
- Tom McCabe (rugby league), Australian rugby league fplayer
- Tom McCabe (athletic director), American sportswriter and college athletics administrator
- Thomas J. McCabe, Sr., developer of cyclomatic complexity, a metric in software engineering
- Thomas Absolem McCabe, former bishop of the Roman Catholic Diocese of Wollongong (1951–1974)
