= Crystal Carey =

American lawyer

- Official portrait, 2026

General Counsel of the National Labor Relations Board
- Incumbent
- Assumed office January 7, 2026
- President: Donald Trump
- Preceded by: Jennifer Abruzzo

Personal details
- Born: Crystal Stowe Georgia, USA

Crystal Carey is an American lawyer who has served as the general counsel of the National Labor Relations Board since 2026.

== Career ==
=== National Labor Relations Board (2009–2018) ===
Carey began working at the National Labor Relations Board in 2009 as an attorney for the general counsel and later a senior counsel for the board.

=== Morgan, Lewis & Bockius (2018–2025) ===
In 2018, Carey joined Morgan, Lewis & Bockius as a trial lawyer. In October 2024, she became a partner at the firm.

== General Counsel of the National Labor Relations Board (2026–present) ==
After his inauguration, President Donald Trump fired the general counsel of the National Labor Relations Board, Jennifer Abruzzo. In March 2025, The American Prospect reported that Trump was set to nominate Carey to succeed Abruzzo. Trump formally nominated Carey on March 25. According to Bloomberg Law, Carey's nomination was indicative of a "pro-employer swing at the board." Carey appeared before the Senate Committee on Health, Education, Labor and Pensions on July 16. Missouri senator Josh Hawley expressed concerns about Carey at the hearing, threatening her nomination. The Senate voted to confirm Carey on December 18. She was sworn in on January 7, 2026.

== Views ==
In November 2024, Carey stated that she was critical of the National Labor Relations Board's scrutinization of captive audience meetings and its decision to overturn a case in which the board had previously ruled employer's statements on collective bargaining were not illegal.
