= Dick McCabe =

Dick McCabe may refer to:

- Dick McCabe (racing driver) (born 1947), NASCAR driver
- Dick McCabe (baseball) (1896–1950), pitcher in Major League Baseball
- Dick McCabe (American football) (1933–1983), American football player
- Dick McCabe (Australian footballer) (1877–1932), Australian rules footballer
- Richard McCabe (born 1960), Scottish actor
