= William McCabe =

William McCabe may refer to:

- William McCabe (footballer), Irish footballer
- William Bernard McCabe (1801–1891), Irish author of historical romances
- William U. McCabe (1880–1931), American attorney and politician from Arkansas
- William Putnam McCabe (1776–1821), emissary and organiser in Ireland for the Society of United Irishmen

== See also ==
- Bill McCabe (disambiguation)
