= Bill McCabe (footballer, born 1908) =

Australian rules footballer

Personal information
- Full name: William Francis McCabe
- Born: 31 January 1908; North Melbourne, Victoria
- Died: 10 April 1945 (aged 37); Fitzroy, Victoria
- Height: 185 cm (6 ft 1 in)
- Weight: 89 kg (196 lb)

Playing career^{1}
Years	Club	Games (Goals)
1927–31	North Melbourne	42 (10)
- ^{1} Playing statistics correct to the end of 1931.

William Francis McCabe (31 January 1908 – 10 April 1945) was an Australian rules footballer who played with North Melbourne in the Victorian Football League (VFL).
