= Bill Whitton =

American football player and coach (1919–2007)

Biographical details
- Born: February 8, 1919; Lanark, Scotland
- Died: November 1, 2007 (aged 88); Plainfield, New Jersey, U.S.

Playing career
- 1946: St. Lawrence

Coaching career (HC unless noted)
- 1950–1955: Lehigh (assistant)
- 1956–1968: Princeton (line)
- 1969–1970: Holy Cross

Head coaching record
- Overall: 0–12–1

William G. Whitton (February 8, 1919 – November 1, 2007) was an American football player and coach. He served as the head football coach at the College of the Holy Cross in Worcester, Massachusetts from 1969 to 1970, compiling a record of 0–12–1. His time at Holy Cross was hampered by a rampant "mini-plague" that forced the cancellation of most of the 1969 season.

Whitton was born in Lanark, Scotland and grew up in Tarrytown, New York. A longtime resident of Plainfield, New Jersey, he died at the age of 88, on November 1, 2007, at Muhlenberg Regional Medical Center in Plainfield.

== Head coaching record ==
Year	Team	Overall	Conference	Standing	Bowl/playoffs
Holy Cross Crusaders (NCAA University Division independent) (1969–1970)
1969	Holy Cross	0–2			
1970	Holy Cross	0–10–1			
Holy Cross:		0–12–1			
Total:		0–12–1			
