= 1969 Holy Cross Crusaders football team =

American college football season

1969 Holy Cross Crusaders football
- Conference: Independent
- Record: 0–2
- Head coach: Bill Whitton (1st season)
- Captains: Thomas F. Lamb; William D. Moncevicz
- Home stadium: Fitton Field

1969 NCAA University Division independents football records
| | Conf. | | | Overall |
| Team | W | L | T | W | | L | | T |
|---|---|---|---|---|---|---|---|---|
| No. 2 Penn State | | – | | 11 | – | 0 | – | 0 |
| No. 17 West Virginia | | – | | 10 | – | 1 | – | 0 |
| No. 12 Houston | | – | | 9 | – | 2 | – | 0 |
| No. 5 Notre Dame | | – | | 8 | – | 2 | – | 1 |
| Buffalo | | – | | 6 | – | 3 | – | 0 |
| Rutgers | | – | | 6 | – | 3 | – | 0 |
| Villanova | | – | | 6 | – | 3 | – | 0 |
| Florida State | | – | | 6 | – | 3 | – | 1 |
| Colgate | | – | | 5 | – | 3 | – | 1 |
| Air Force | | – | | 6 | – | 4 | – | 0 |
| West Texas State | | – | | 6 | – | 4 | – | 0 |
| Boston College | | – | | 5 | – | 4 | – | 0 |
| New Mexico State | | – | | 5 | – | 5 | – | 0 |
| Southern Miss | | – | | 5 | – | 5 | – | 0 |
| Syracuse | | – | | 5 | – | 5 | – | 0 |
| Army | | – | | 4 | – | 5 | – | 1 |
| Virginia Tech | | – | | 4 | – | 5 | – | 1 |
| Georgia Tech | | – | | 4 | – | 6 | – | 0 |
| Miami (FL) | | – | | 4 | – | 6 | – | 0 |
| Pittsburgh | | – | | 4 | – | 6 | – | 0 |
| Dayton | | – | | 3 | – | 7 | – | 0 |
| Marshall | | – | | 3 | – | 7 | – | 0 |
| Northern Illinois | | – | | 3 | – | 7 | – | 0 |
| Tulane | | – | | 3 | – | 7 | – | 0 |
| Utah State | | – | | 3 | – | 7 | – | 0 |
| Navy | | – | | 1 | – | 9 | – | 0 |
| Xavier | | – | | 1 | – | 9 | – | 0 |
Rankings from AP Poll

The 1969 Holy Cross Crusaders football team was an American football team that represented the College of the Holy Cross as an independent during the 1969 NCAA University Division football season. Head coach Bill Whitton led the team for his first year.

Only the first two games of Holy Cross' 10-game schedule were played, both away losses. For the team's second game, 13 players were listed as injured, including eight with hepatitis.

== Schedule ==
| Date | Opponent | Site | Result | Attendance | Source |
|---|---|---|---|---|---|
| September 24 | at Harvard | Harvard Stadium; Boston, MA | L 0–13 | 25,000 | |
| October 4 | at Dartmouth | Memorial Field; Hanover, NH | L 6–38 | 13,500 | |
| October 11 | at Colgate | Andy Kerr Stadium; Hamilton, NY | Canceled | | |
| October 18 | Buffalo | Fitton Field; Worcester, MA | Canceled | | |
| October 25 | at Syracuse | Archbold Stadium; Syracuse, NY | Canceled | | |
| November 1 | Villanova | Fitton Field; Worcester, MA | Canceled | | |
| November 8 | at UMass | Alumni Stadium; Hadley, MA | Canceled | | |
| November 15 | Rutgers | Fitton Field; Worcester, MA | Canceled | | |
| November 22 | at Connecticut | Memorial Stadium; Storrs, CT | Canceled | | |
| November 29 | Boston College | Fitton Field; Worcester, MA (rivalry) | Canceled | | |

== Cancellation ==
Two days after the Dartmouth game, with all team members affected—20 players positively ill and 55 "probably ill"—the college canceled its remaining games. Coaches and other football staff were also stricken. Worcester city health officials later pinpointed the source of the infection to a water fountain on the football practice field. Players contracted the disease during preseason workouts. Other students on the campus were not affected, including members of the freshman football team, which did not practice with the varsity team in the preseason.

The eight remaining teams Holy Cross was scheduled to play were Colgate, Buffalo, Syracuse, Villanova, Massachusetts, Rutgers, Connecticut, and Boston College.

Because of the season cancellation, the annual Boston College–Holy Cross football rivalry game was not held, the first interruption since 1943. Apart from those two years, the two Jesuit New England universities would meet every year from 1919 to 1986. To replace Holy Cross on its 1969 schedule, Boston College slated Syracuse, which had been scheduled to play Holy Cross in October. BC–Syracuse was a familiar matchup by the 1960s, and would later develop into a conference rivalry.

The "Purple and Silver" did take the field one more time in 1969, as the football team from Sacramento State College in California donned Holy Cross Crusaders uniforms for their final home game, November 20, against the University of Puget Sound. Students at the college paid to fly Holy Cross' two team captains, Tom Lamb and Bill Moncevicz, to be their guests at the West Coast game.

== Statistical leaders ==
Statistical leaders for the 1969 Crusaders included:

- Rushing: Steve Jutras, 74 yards on 32 attempts
- Passing: Howie Burke, 200 yards, 19 completions and 1 touchdown on 40 attempts
- Receiving: Eddie Jenkins, 70 yards on 8 receptions
- Scoring: Dan Harper, 6 points from 1 touchdown
- Total offense: Howie Burke, 193 yards (200 passing, minus-7 rushing)
- All-purpose yards: Tom Lamb, 108 yards (56 rushing, 40 receiving, 12 returning)
