= Paul M. Herzog =

- Born: August 21, 1906; New York City, U.S.
- Died: November 23, 1986 (aged 80); Manhattan, New York City, U.S.
- Occupations: Attorney; federal government employee; university administrator; educator
- Spouse(s): Madeleine Schafer (divorced) Julie Chamberlain d'Estournelles (d. 1980); Elizabeth Peterson Andrews (his death)
- Children: John Herzog; Andrea Herzog; Judy T. Cullen (step-daughter); Alexander Trowbridge (step-son)

Paul M. Herzog (August 21, 1906 – November 23, 1986) was an American lawyer, educator, civil servant, and university administrator. He was chairman of the United States National Labor Relations Board from 1945 to 1953.

== Early life and career ==
Paul M. Herzog was born in New York City on August 21, 1906, to Mr. and Mrs. Paul Herzog. His father was an attorney in Platzek, Stroock & Herzog, a large and notable New York City law firm.

He obtained his high school diploma from the Lincoln School and his bachelor's degree from Harvard College in 1927. He took a job as an instructor in government and economics in 1928 at the University of Wisconsin and then at Harvard University. He graduated with a law degree from Columbia Law School in 1936.

Herzog left Harvard in 1931. He became the assistant to the secretary of the federal National Labor Board in 1933, but left the agency in 1935. Governor Herbert H. Lehman appointed him to New York's State Labor Relations Board in 1937, and reappointed him in 1939. In 1942, Governor Lehman appointed Herzog to be the chairman of the State Labor Board. During his tenure on the State Labor Board, Herzog upheld the right of New York City school janitors to join labor unions. Herzog quit his post in February 1944 to accept a commission in the United States Navy Reserve.

== NLRB chairmanship ==
With World War II ending, President Harry S. Truman appointed Herzog to be chairman of the National Labor Relations Board (NLRB) on June 7, 1945. During his tenure on the NLRB, Herzog became known as one of the nation's foremost experts in labor law and was a swing vote between the board's pro-labor and pro-management members. He provided the critical final vote which gave foremen the right to organize unions, voted to make pensions a subject of mandatory bargaining, agreed that employees who struck for economic reasons were not entitled to vote in decertification elections so long as they remained on strike, and for the first time in NLRB history ruled on the issue of jurisdictional strikes. Herzog was accused by Congressional and business critics of suppressing corporate freedom of speech, a claim Herzog denied. In several rulings in 1947, he even agreed to expand management speech rights during union organizing campaigns.

A number of controversies occurred during Herzog's tenure on the NLRB, contributing to passage of the Taft–Hartley Act. Among these was a proposal by Secretary of Labor Lewis B. Schwellenbach and Rep. Fred A. Hartley Jr. (R-N.J.) to outlaw communist parties and require a non-communist oath from labor leaders. Another was a growing movement in 1946 and 1947 to amend the National Labor Relations Act (NLRA) to correct what critics saw as a pro-labor tilt in federal law. Herzog publicly admitted the need for some change in the NLRA, but privately in a series of memoranda to President Truman strongly opposed the proposed Taft-Hartley amendments. He felt the communist oath provisions were unconstitutional, that the amendments would turn the NLRA into a management weapon, that creation of an independent general counsel would weaken the NLRB, and that the law's dismantling of the agency's economic analysis unit deprived the NLRB of essential expertise. Nonetheless, Congress overrode Truman's veto of the Taft-Hartley Act on June 23, 1947, and the bill became law.

=== Implementing Taft-Hartley ===
Herzog's implementation of the Taft-Hartley Act proved problematic. Herzog and other NLRB staff had secretly worked with pro-labor members of Congress to draft critical analyses of the Taft-Hartley bill, draft speeches critical of the bill, and even draft legislation for liberal Republican members of Congress designed to water down the bill. When these actions were uncovered, conservative members of Congress tried to have Herzog removed from office. Herzog considered resigning (as many other NLRB staff did) and even consulted with Truman about it (who counseled him to stay on). Liberal Republican Senator Irving Ives talked to conservative Republican Senator Robert A. Taft about it, but to both Ives' and Herzog's astonishment Taft said he believed Herzog should remain.

The Taft-Hartley Act made the office of the NLRB general counsel independent from the chair; the question was who should become general counsel now that Gerhard Van Arkel (the previous counsel) had resigned in the wake of the Taft-Hartley Act's passage. NLRB Member James J. Reynolds suggested 62-year-old NLRB trial lawyer Robert N. Denham, a strong conservative who had exhibited near-racist views in some of his opinions. When he learned of Denham's nomination, Herzog exclaimed, "My god, that's appalling!"

Once installed as general counsel, Denham announced that all American Federation of Labor (AFL) and Congress of Industrial Organizations (CIO) leaders and their affiliate unions would be denied the protection of the NLRA if a single officer at any level refused to sign a non-communist oath (which Philip Murray and most CIO union heads declined to do). In what was seen as a major test of how much authority the board retained vis-a-vis the general counsel, the NLRB held in Northern Virginia Broadcasters, Inc., 75 NLRB 11 (1947) that the anti-communist oath provisions of the Taft-Hartley Act applied only to local, national, and international leaders and not to officers of national trade union centers like the AFL or CIO.

For two years, Herzog and Denham also struggled over whether the board or the general counsel had the authority to assert jurisdiction in unfair labor practice cases. In May 1949, in A-1 Photo Service, 83 NLRB 564 (1949) and Pereira Studios, 83 NLRB 587 (1949), Herzog finally concluded that the board and board alone had that authority. Herzog's conflict with Denham worsened when, in November 1949, Denham issued an unfair labor practice against the AFL in Haleston Drug Stores, Inc., 86 NLRB 1166 (1949), and the board refused to hear the case by declining jurisdiction over the matter. When the employer appealed to the Ninth Circuit Court of Appeals, Denham not only refused to represent the board but actively assisted the employer in seeking to overturn the board's action.

Acting on recommendations generated by the Hoover Commission, Herzog prevailed upon President Truman to issue Reorganization Plan No. 12, which would abolish the office of general counsel and transfer its functions back to the board. But Senator Taft refused to let Truman oust Denham through subterfuge, and the reorganization plan failed to win Congressional approval.

Herzog now resolved to have Denham removed:

Denham had survived the legislative battles, but he was out-matched when pitted against Herzog in bureaucratic in-fighting. As a special assistant in the White House put it, Herzog waged his battle with "extraordinary subtlety," "watching and waiting for bigger and better errors by Denham," using "restraint," "proper erudition," "protective camouflage," "the public handshake, the smile, and the knife so fast that you are never aware of it until the severed head rolls."

Just before a May 22, 1950, meeting between Denham and the board, Herzog met with President Truman and was told to stand firm against any encroachment on the board's authority. The meeting between Denham and the board degenerated into bitter personal criticism. Herzog met with Truman, advising the president of his intention to leave. Truman asked Herzog to stay, and Herzog agreed—if Denham were fired. Truman agreed, and on July 24, 1950, Herzog was reappointed to another five-year term as NLRB chair. When Denham made changes to the NLRB's appellate brief in the Vulcan Forging case, the five board members asked President Truman to act to prevent further undermining of administration labor policy and additional embarrassment in the courts. Truman asked Denham to resign on September 15, 1950, and Denham did so.

=== Post-Denham NLRB tenure ===
Between 1947 and 1953, Herzog led board majorities in concluding that NLRB-sponsored union organizing elections could not be held at workplaces controlled by a union shop contract if the state in question had banned the union shop, that unions found in violation of the Taft-Hartley Act could not file for elections or unfair labor practice complaints, ruled secondary boycotts a violation of the Taft-Hartley Act, held it an unfair labor practice for an employer to refuse to open its financial books if it claimed it could not afford a wage increase, and found that a lockout designed to coerce employees into agreeing to a collective bargaining agreement was illegal. Despite agreeing with other board members that the anti-communist oath provisions of the Taft-Hartley Act did not infringe on freedom of speech or association, Herzog nonetheless asked Congress to pass legislation providing for an alternative oath which would not impinge so heavily on freedom of speech and association.

After Dwight D. Eisenhower won the presidency in November 1952, Paul Herzog agreed to resign effective June 30, 1953, in order to allow the new president his own choice as NLRB chairman.

== Later career and death ==
Herzog rejoined Harvard University while still serving as chair of the NLRB. He was appointed associate dean of the Graduate School of Public Administration (the predecessor of the John F. Kennedy School of Government) in 1945, and was acting dean from 1953 to 1957.

Herzog became executive vice president of the American Arbitration Association after leaving the NLRB, and was elected president of the association in 1961. He was appointed president of the Salzburg Global Seminar (a non-profit organization which works to enhance European understanding of American culture, economics, and politics) in 1965, and retired from that position in 1971.

Herzog suffered a stroke in 1985 from which he made only partial recovery. He died at his home in Manhattan on November 23, 1986. He was cremated.

== Personal life ==
Paul Herzog was a Presbyterian. He was a member of the Century Club, the Harvard Club of New York City, and the Metropolitan Club.

He married Madeleine Schafer (the granddaughter of Oscar S. Straus, a former Secretary of Commerce and Labor under President Theodore Roosevelt and the first Jewish cabinet secretary) in 1929. The couple had two children, John and Andrea. Their marriage ended in divorce.

In 1959, Herzog married Julie Chamberlain d'Estournelles, the executive director of the Woodrow Wilson Foundation. She had two children from two previous marriages, Judy T. Cullen and Alexander Trowbridge (himself United States Secretary of Commerce from June 14, 1967, to March 1, 1968). Julie Herzog died in May 1980.

In 1981, Herzog married the former Elizabeth Peterson Andrews. She survived him upon his death, along with Herzog's two children and two stepchildren.
