= Gene Flynn =

American college athletics administrator

Biographical details
- Born: 1901; Rochester, New York, U.S.
- Died: December 22, 1991 (aged 90); Leominster, Massachusetts, U.S.
- Education: College of the Holy Cross

Administrative career (AD unless noted)
- 1928–1942: Holy Cross (Asst. AD)
- 1946–1966: Holy Cross

Accomplishments and honors

Championships
- 1947 NCAA basketball tournament 1952 College World Series; 1954 National Invitation Tournament

Eugene F. Flynn (1901 – December 22, 1991) was an American college athletics administrator who served as athletic director at the College of the Holy Cross from 1946 to 1966.

== Early life ==
Flynn was born in Rochester, New York to James A. and Anna (Oliver) Flynn. He graduated from Holy Cross in 1922 and returned to the school as assistant athletic director in 1928. In 1942 he entered the United States Army as a captain and was assigned to the United States Department of War's Officer Procurement Office. He later served as public relations officer at Cushing General Hospital and Fort Devens.

== Holy Cross ==
Holy Cross' athletic director Tom McCabe died in 1943 and when Flynn returned from the military was appointed his successor. During his tenure, the Crusaders appeared in the 1946 Orange Bowl, won the 1947 NCAA basketball tournament, the 1952 College World Series, and the 1954 National Invitation Tournament. Notable athletes who attended Holy Cross during this time included Bob Cousy, Tom Heinsohn, Togo Palazzi, George Kaftan, Jack Foley, Mel Massucco, and Paul Harney. Flynn retired on July 1, 1966, and was inducted into the Holy Cross Hall of Fame that same year.

== Later life ==
A former resident of Worcester, Massachusetts and Leicester, Massachusetts, Flynn spent his later years in Lighthouse Point, Florida. In 1990 he moved to a nursing home in Leominster, Massachusetts, where he died on December 22, 1991, at the age of 90. He was survived by his wife.
