= Dick McCabe (Australian footballer) =

Australian rules footballer and umpire

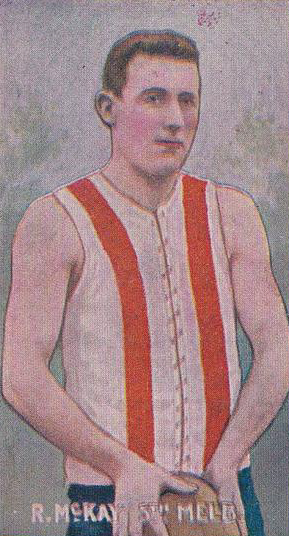
- Cigarette card of McCabe in 1907

Personal information
- Full name: John Francis McCabe
- Born: 15 June 1877; Farrell Flat, South Australia
- Died: 21 June 1932 (aged 55); South Melbourne, Victoria
- Original team: Essendon District
- Position: Defender

Playing career^{1}
Years	Club	Games (Goals)
1897–1898	Fitzroy	24 (14)
1899–1903	St Kilda	73 (4)
1904–1907	South Melbourne	51 (0)
Total		148 (18)
- ^{1} Playing statistics correct to the end of 1907.

John Francis "Dick" McCabe (15 June 1877 – 21 June 1932) was an Australian rules footballer who played with Fitzroy, St Kilda and South Melbourne in the Victorian Football League (VFL); he used the pseudonym Dick McKay during his playing days and thus that is how his name appears in many football records.

From Essendon District, McCabe was a defender and was part of Fitzroy's inaugural VFL match in 1897. He spent another season at Fitzroy before crossing to St Kilda, which he captained in 1901. Finally, McCabe played for South Melbourne, but finished his 148-game career without making a single finals appearance, which was a VFL record at the time.

He crossed to Williamstown in the VFA early in the 1907 season and was full-back in the premiership team of that year, 'Town's first pennant-winning side. He played for the Villagers in 1907 and 1908 before crossing to Port Melbourne in 1909 and then returning to Williamstown early in 1910. After two further games he retired, 14 seasons of senior football having finally taken its toll on his body. He played 31 games and kicked 2 goals for Williamstown, and a further 17 matches for Port Melbourne.

McKay was later a boundary umpire for the VFL and in 1918 officiated in a Junction Oval match as the field umpire, replacing Arthur Norden during the third quarter following an injury.
