= John F. McCabe =

American judge (born 1958)

John McCabe
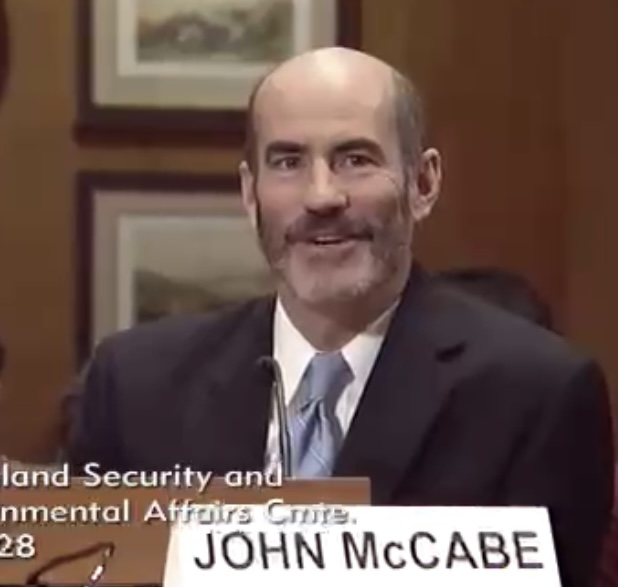

Associate Judge of the Superior Court of the District of Columbia
- Incumbent
- Assumed office February 24, 2012
- President: Barack Obama
- Preceded by: James Boasberg

Magistrate Judge on the Superior Court of the District of Columbia
- In office October 2002 – February 24, 2012

Personal details
- Born: John Francis McCabe, Jr. September 15, 1958 (age 66); New York City, New York, U.S.
- Education: Duke University (BA); Tulane University (JD)

John Francis McCabe, Jr. (born September 15, 1958) is an associate judge of the Superior Court of the District of Columbia.

== Education and career ==
McCabe earned his Bachelor of Arts from Duke University in 1980, and his Juris Doctor from Tulane University Law School in 1986.

McCabe was a staff attorney with the Legal Aid Society of the District of Columbia from 1989 to 1990. He worked in the office of the Attorney General for the District of Columbia from 1990 to 1998. He then went on to work in the U.S. Attorney's Office in the District of Columbia.

=== D.C. superior court ===
In October 2002, McCabe was appointed as a magistrate judge of the Superior Court of the District of Columbia by Chief Judge Rufus King.

President Barack Obama nominated McCabe on July 11, 2011, to a 15-year term as an associate judge of the Superior Court of the District of Columbia to the seat vacated by James Boasberg. On November 8, 2011, the Senate Committee on Homeland Security and Governmental Affairs held a hearing on his nomination and on the following day, November 9, 2011, the Committee reported his nomination favorably to the senate floor. On November 18, 2011, the full Senate confirmed his nomination by voice vote. He was sworn in on February 24, 2012.

== Personal life ==
McCabe grew up in New Jersey. In 1989, he moved to Washington D.C. where he's been living since.
