= Patrick E. McCabe =

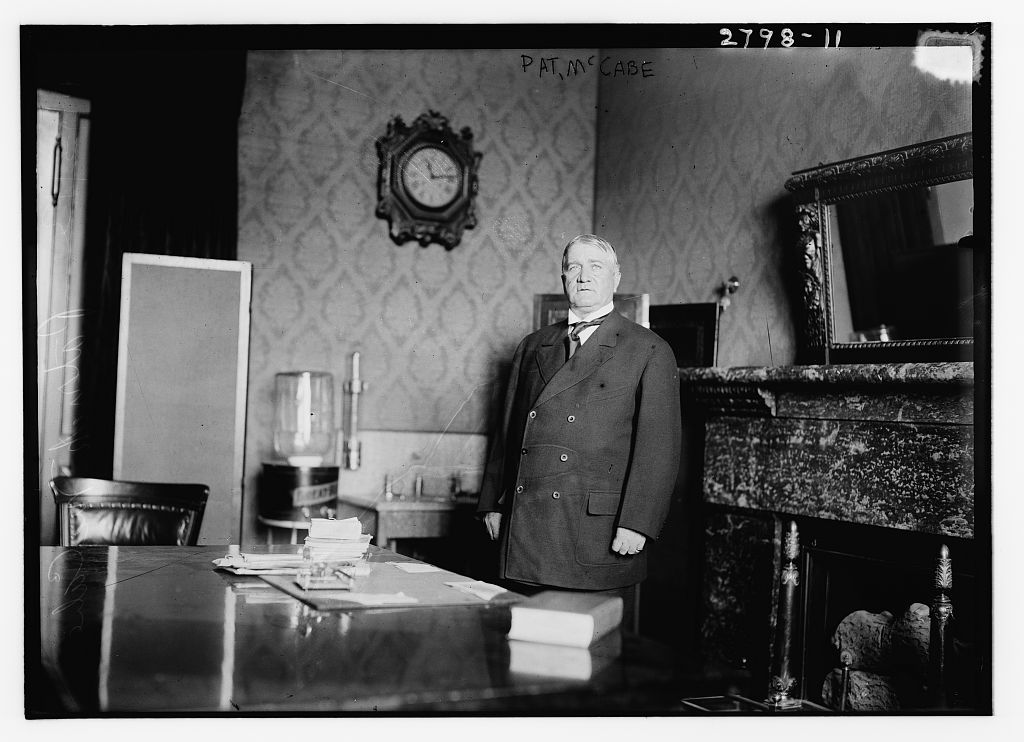
Patrick E. McCabe

Patrick E. McCabe (June 26, 1860 – November 2, 1931) was Clerk of the New York State Senate in Albany. He was the Democratic leader of Albany County, New York for 20 years.

== Biography ==
He was born in Albany, New York on June 26, 1860 and entered politics in 1885. He was Clerk of the New York State Senate from 1911 to 1915, officiating during the 134th, 135th, 136th and 137th New York State Legislatures. On March 28, 1914, he was appointed as State Commissioner of Conservation, to take office on December 1 for a term of six years.

He died on November 2, 1931.
