= Kevin McCabe (American football) =

American football player (born 1984)

Profile
- Position: Quarterback

Personal information
- Born: November 12, 1984 (age 41); Pittsburgh, Pennsylvania, U.S.
- Listed height: 6 ft 2 in (1.88 m)
- Listed weight: 210 lb (95 kg)

Career information
- High school: Pine-Richland (Pittsburgh)
- College: Virginia (2003–2006); California (PA) (2008)
- NFL draft: 2009: undrafted

Career history
- Pittsburgh Steelers (2009)*; Cleveland Gladiators (2010); Pittsburgh Power (2010–2011)
- * Offseason or practice squad member only

Career AFL statistics
- Comp. / Att.: 41 / 72
- Passing yards: 471
- TD–INT: 13–7
- QB rating: 76.79
- Stats at ArenaFan.com

Kevin Richard McCabe (born November 12, 1984) is an American former professional football quarterback who played two seasons in the Arena Football League (AFL) with the Cleveland Gladiators and Pittsburgh Power. He played college football at the University of Virginia and California University of Pennsylvania. McCabe was also a member of the Pittsburgh Steelers of the National Football League (NFL).

== Early life ==
McCabe played high school football at Pine-Richland High School in Pittsburgh, Pennsylvania. He completed 123 of 196 passes for 2,179 yards and 30 touchdowns his senior year while leading his team to a school-record 12 wins and the WPIAL Class AAA final. He was also named All-Section his sophomore and junior years. McCabe completed 79 of 131 pass attempts for 1,053 yards and 13 touchdowns as a junior. He completed 86 of 196 attempts for 1,115 yards and eight touchdowns in his first year as a starter in 10th grade. he finished his career with 288 completions in 523 attempts for 4,347 yards and 51 touchdowns.

== College career ==
McCabe played for the Virginia Cavaliers of the University of Virginia from 2004 to 2006. He was redshirted in 2003.

He transferred in 2007 to play for the California Vulcans of the California University of Pennsylvania. He completed 65 percent of his passes for 3,214 yards, 32 touchdowns and just 10 interceptions in 386 pass attempts. He helped the Vulcans to a 12–2 record and the NCAA Division II semifinals.

== Professional career ==
McCabe signed with the Pittsburgh Steelers on April 27, 2009, after going undrafted in the 2009 NFL draft. He was released by the Steelers on June 18, 2009.

He was signed by the Cleveland Gladiators on March 5, 2010.

McCabe signed with the Pittsburgh Power on November 15, 2010. He recorded ten touchdowns on 408 passing yards in 2011. He was released by the Power on June 23, 2011.
