= Kevin McCabe (Gaelic footballer) =

Tyrone Gaelic footballer

Personal information
- Nickname: McCabe
- Born: Tyrone, Northern Ireland
- Occupation: Company Director
- Height: 5 Foot 10

Sport
- Sport: Gaelic football
- Position: Half back
Club
- Years: Club
- ? -?: Clonoe
Inter-county
- Years: County
- 1991-1992 1984-1989 1976-1982: Tyrone; Tyrone; Tyrone
Inter-county titles
- Ulster titles: 3
- All Stars: 1

Kevin McCabe (born 1960) is a former Gaelic footballer who played for the Clonoe club and the Tyrone county team. Nickname [Prince] He has the distinction of being Tyrone's first ever All Star award winner in 1980. He was also part of the first Tyrone team to make it to the All-Ireland Final in 1986.

Between 1986 All-Ireland Final and his second Ulster title, he played for a season and a half for the Irish League football team, Portadown F.C., being their top scorer in 1983.
