= Joseph McCabe (hunter) =

South African hunter (1816–1865)

Joseph McCabe (1816 Cape Town – 28 February 1865 Molepolole, Botswana was a hunter, trader, explorer and botanical collector from Cape Colony. He was the son of an Irish surgeon serving in the British army.

At first he worked as a clerk in Uitenhage and in 1835 took part in the Sixth Frontier War. He followed the Great Trek to escape British rule in the Cape Colony and acquired a farm some distance north of present Potchefstroom (in the South African Republic), leaving from there on hunting expeditions, and on occasion returning to Grahamstown. In 1846 he was charged by the Transvaal authorities with supplying arms to local Bantu tribes, but the case was dismissed for want of evidence.

Letsholathebe, of the Batawana tribe, purchased Ngamiland's first horse from McCabe in 1852.
