= Joe McCabe (baseball) =

American baseball player (born 1938)

- Catcher
- Born: August 27, 1938 (age 87); Indianapolis, Indiana, U.S.
- Batted: Right Threw: Right

MLB debut
- April 18, 1964, for the Minnesota Twins

Last MLB appearance
- May 22, 1965, for the Washington Senators

MLB statistics
- Batting average: .174
- Home runs: 1
- Runs batted in: 7
- Stats at Baseball Reference

Teams
- Minnesota Twins (1964); Washington Senators (1965)

Joe Robert McCabe (born August 27, 1938) is an American former professional baseball catcher, who played in Major League Baseball during the 1964 and 1965 seasons. The 6 ft 0 in (1.83 m), 195 lb (88 kg) McCabe was born in Indianapolis, Indiana. He attended Purdue University, where he played college baseball for the Boilermakers from 1956–1960.

McCabe was inducted into the Purdue Athletic Hall of Fame. He holds the all-time highest batting average (.423 for the season and .438 in the Big Ten). Elected Captain and MVP on the 1960 baseball team which also consisted of 6 future professional baseball players.

McCabe was signed by the "original" Washington Senators (now the Minnesota Twins) as an amateur free agent in 1960. He made his Major League debut on April 18, 1964, for the Twins. He was traded to the expansion edition of the Senators (now the Texas Rangers) for Ken Retzer on October 15, 1964. His last game was on May 22, 1965.

Set a consecutive game hitting streak for 1962 Vancouver Mounties of Pacific Coast League – 21 – record stands.

After baseball, he became an airline pilot with ATP (Airline Transport Pilot) ratings on Boeing 707s, 720s, 727s, 737s, 747s, 747-400s, 757s, 767s, L-1011s, DC-10s, and one of the first to qualify on the 777s. The only person to have accomplished both – of playing in the big leagues and piloting the large commercial airliners for major carriers – Pan American and United Airlines.

In September 2016, Joe was inducted into the Purdue Athletic Hall of fame.

In July 2019, Joe was honored as a Significant Sig by the Sigma Chi Fraternity for his accomplishments after college. In 2000, Joe testified before a sub-committee of Congress attempting to raise the mandatory age of retirement for pilots to age 65. The age was consequently raised for all commercial pilots.
