= Christopher John McCabe =

British scientist and novelist

Christopher John McCabe (born 20 October 1967) is a British scientist and novelist. He is Professor of Molecular Endocrinology at the University of Birmingham and writes novels under the pseudonyms John McCabe and John Macken.

He was born in Vancouver to English parents who were originally from Yorkshire. The family later returned to England and settled in Somerset.

== Publications ==
=== Novels as "John McCabe" ===
- Stickleback (1998)
- Paper (2000)
- Snakeskin (2001)
- Big Spender (2003)
- Herding Cats (2004)

=== Novels as "John Macken" ===
- Dirty Little Lies (2007)
- Trial by Blood (2008)
- Breaking Point (2009)
- Control (2011)
