= Murder of John J. McCabe =

1969 child murder in Massachusetts

- Born: March 13, 1954; Wilmington, Massachusetts, U.S.
- Died: September 27, 1969 (aged 15); Lowell, Massachusetts, U.S.

John Joseph McCabe (March 13, 1954 – September 27, 1969) was an American boy from Tewksbury, Massachusetts, who was abducted and murdered after attending a Knights of Columbus dance in Tewksbury. His bound and strangled body was found in an empty lot on Maple Street in Lowell the next day. McCabe's murder remained unsolved for over four decades, until April 2011, when three men were arrested for his murder. One was given a deal of no prison time if he testified against the other two. The second was found not guilty at his trial. On February 20, 2014, 62-year-old Walter Shelley, of Tewksbury, after being found guilty of first degree murder, was sentenced in Lowell Superior Court to life in prison for the murder. The verdict was later overturned in favor of a finding of second degree murder. Shelley is eligible for parole after 15 years.

The case was covered in a 48 Hours episode titled "The Pact".

== See also ==
- List of homicides in Massachusetts
