= Kevin McCabe (economist) =

American economist

Kevin McCabe is an American economist and economic theorist. He works in the fields of experimental economics, neuroeconomics and the study of human trust and decision making.

== Biography ==
McCabe spent his early career at the University of Arizona where he began collaborating with Vernon Smith, co-winner of the 2002 Nobel Prize in Economics (with Daniel Kahneman). He received his BS in Economics in 1976 from Villanova University and PhD in 1985 from the University of Pennsylvania. McCabe was a fellow in the Center for Political Economy at Washington University.

McCabe is currently professor of Economics, Law, and Neuroscience, and director of the Center for the Study of Neuroeconomics at George Mason University. He is a senior investigator at the Krasnow Institute for Advanced Study, the Interdisciplinary Center for Economic Science, and the Mercatus Center.

== Research ==
His research area is the application of experimental methods to economics including experimental economics, economics system design, neuroeconomics, and the use of virtual world technology for experimentation.

He is one of the co-authors of a series of early papers on the ‘trust game.’

Research Papers in Economics placed him in the top five percent of authors by the average rank score metric in May 2016.

He has commented on the possible link between the sex drive and risk taking.

He has described human values such as compassion and forgiveness the "currency of grace".

== Publications ==
=== Journal articles ===
- Berg, J., Dickhaut, J., & McCabe, K. (1995). Trust, reciprocity, and social history. Games and economic behavior, 10(1), 122-142.
- Hoffman, E., McCabe, K., & Smith, V. L. (1996). Social distance and other-regarding behavior in dictator games. The American economic review, 86(3), 653-660.
- An article by McCabe was published in the first issue of Journal of Experimental Political Science.
- Can more be less? An experimental test of the resource curse, (2014) co-authored with Omar Al-Ubaydli and Peter Twieg, Journal of Experimental Political Science, Cambridge University Press
- Haruvy, Ernan, Li, Sherry X., McCabe, Kevin, & Twieg, Peter (2017). Communication and visibility in public goods provision. Games and Economic Behavior, 105, 276-296.
