= Joe McCabe (hurler) =

Irish hurler (1919–2019)

Personal information
- Native name: Seosamh Mac Cába (Irish)
- Born: 31 March 1919 Clonad, County Laois, Ireland
- Died: 2 January 2019 (aged 99) Clonad, County Laois, Ireland
- Occupation: Welder

Sport
- Sport: Hurling
- Position: Goalkeeper
Club
- Years: Club
- 1935–1957: Clonad
Club titles
- Laois titles: 8
Inter-county
- Years: County
- 1938–1942: Laois
Inter-county titles
- Leinster titles: 0
- All-Irelands: 0
- NHL: 0

Joseph McCabe (31 March 1919 – 2 January 2019) was an Irish hurler who played for Laois Senior Championship club Clonad and at inter-county level with the Laois senior hurling team. He was usually deployed as a goalkeeper, but also played as a forward.

== Playing career ==
=== Clonad ===
McCabe was first selected for the Clonad junior hurling team in 1934. After losing the Laois Junior Championship final to Derrydavey, he was soon added to the Clonad senior hurling team. On 15 March 1936, McCabe won his first Laois Senior Championship medal after a 7–03 to 1–05 defeat of Rathdowney in the delayed 1935 final.

After surrendering their championship title the following year, McCabe won a second Laois Senior Championship medal when Clonad defeated Abbeyleix by 2–07 to 2–01 in the final.

After a hiatus of nine years, McCabe won his third Laois Senior Championship medal on 24 November 1946 after a 3–04 to 2–03 defeat of reigning champions Abbeyleix. It was the first of three successive final victories over Abbeyleix.

On 27 August 1950, McCacbe won his sixth Leinster Senior Championship medal when a then record crowd of 3,500 saw Clonad defeat Errill by 3–13 to 1–05.

McCabe won his seventh Laois Senior Championship medal on 4 October 1953 after a 2–14 to 2–07 defeat of Kyle in the final. He won his eighth and final Laois Senior Championship medal on 12 September 1954 when Clonad defeated Errill by 1–09 to 0–04.

McCabe played his last game for the Cloand senior team in 1957, but rejoined the club's junior team with whom he finished his career in the early 1960s. In addition to his accomplishments on the field, McCabe was known for mentoring younger players in Clonad, helping to sustain the club’s competitive spirit throughout the 1950s and 1960s. His commitment to community development and youth training earned him recognition from the Laois County Board in later years for his lifelong contribution to hurling.

=== Laois ===
McCabe joined the Laois minor hurling team in 1933 and played for a record five seasons. On 12 August 1934, he was in goal when Laois defeated Dublin by 8–04 to 2–00 to win the Leinster Championship. McCabe retained his place in goal for the subsequent All-Ireland final on 2 September 1934, which Laois lost to Tipperary by 4–03 to 3–05.

McCabe joined the Laois senior hurling team as goalkeeper in 1938. He played for a number of seasons before leaving the team in 1942.

Beyond his playing years, McCabe remained involved with Laois hurling as a selector and local club mentor, contributing to the county’s player development programs in the 1950s. His continued involvement helped nurture a new generation of Laois hurlers who carried forward the traditions he helped establish.

== Honours ==
Clonad

- Laois Senior Hurling Championship (8): 1935, 1937, 1946, 1947, 1948, 1950, 1953, 1954
- Laois Intermediate Football Championship (1): 1954
- Laois Junior Football Championship (1): 1934

Laois

- Leinster Minor Hurling Championship (1): 1934
