= Edward A. McCabe =

American lawyer

Edward Aenas McCabe (March 4, 1917 – October 4, 2008) was an attorney, a political staffer in the Eisenhower administration, and the founding chairman of the student loans organization Sallie Mae.

== Politics ==
McCabe joined the White House staff on January 16, 1956, as an Associate Special Counsel to President Dwight D. Eisenhower. He had previously served as General Counsel to the House Committee on Education and Labor from 1953 up to his appointment to the White House staff. He served in the Special Counsel's office until September 10, 1958 when he assumed the position of Administrative Assistant to the President. He, with the other members of the legislative liaison office, worked to advance the Administration's legislative programs with the United States Congress.

After leaving the White House staff, he was made Research Director for Barry Goldwater in 1963, writing speeches for him, and he became Research Director for the Republican Party in 1964.

== Law ==
McCabe earned a degree from the Columbus School of Law. He returned to law in 1964 after Goldwater was defeated in the Presidential race.

== Education funding and access ==
He chaired Sallie Mae from 1972–78, sat on the USA Funds board from '78-96, returned to Sallie Mae to be chair again from '81-90, and was a director of the USA Group from '93-00. He founded the Lumina Foundation for Education in 2000 and chaired it till 2003, then was a board member till 2006.

== Personal life ==
McCabe was born in Ballybay, Ireland and moved to Philadelphia in 1928 when he was still a boy. He lived in Bethesda, Maryland.

McCabe was married twice, to Janet for 30 years to 1981 when she died, and then to Verna for 21 years until his death. He died aged 91 after suffering from dementia. He had four children and 17 grandchildren.
