= Robert N. Denham =

American counsel for the National Labor Relations Board

- Born: October 23, 1885; St. Louis, Missouri, United States
- Died: June 18, 1954 (aged 68); St. Louis, Missouri, United States
- Occupation: attorney
- Known for: general counsel to National Labor Relations Board

Robert N. Denham (October 23, 1885 – June 18, 1954) was an American attorney who served as general counsel to the National Labor Relations Board.

== Background ==
Robert N. Denham was born on October 23, 1885, in St. Louis, Missouri. His parents were Robert Newton Denham and Sarah Compton. He studied in Missouri and Michigan, gained admittance to the bar in Texas, Missouri, and Michigan.

== Career ==
During World War I, Denham served as second lieutenant in the Air Corps. Denham became an attorney for banking, brokerage, and corporate interests in New York, Florida, and on the Pacific Coast.

In 1928, Denham became a trial examiner. In August 1947, he became the general counsel for the National Labor Relations Board (NLRB). He held "conservative views" and wielded "considerable influence" on labor-management relations and interpretations of the newly passed Taft-Hartley Act. In 1950, US President Harry S. Truman fired Denham (New York Times: "left at the behest of the President").

While NLRB general counsel, Denham received considerable news coverage as a "quasi-Republican." Nominated by US President Harry S. Truman, Denham received unanimous approval by the US Senate Labor Committee. He received "full and independent powers to investigate violations, file complaints and prosecute offenders before the board." In August 1947, he supported an "Anti-Red Affidavit Rule" and so sided with US Senator Robert A. Taft. In October 1947, the NLRB overruled him, which meant that top officers of the American Federation of Labor (AFL) and Congress of Industrial Organizations (CIO) would not have to sign an anti-Communist oath per the Taft-Hartley Act. In September 1950, President Truman asked Denham to resign.

In 1950, Denham resumed private practice. He lobbied for the Continental Baking Company. He was an advisor to the President's Conference on Administrative Procedure.

== Personal life and death ==
Denham married three times and had four children.

Denham died aged 68 on June 18, 1954, in St. Louis.
