= Tom McCabe (athletic director) =

American sportswriter/college athletics administrator

Biographical details
- Died: April 5, 1943 (aged 54); Brookline, Massachusetts, U.S.
- Education: College of the Holy Cross

Playing career
- 1911–1914: Holy Cross

Coaching career (HC unless noted)
- 1915–1919: Boston College HS (MA)

Administrative career (AD unless noted)
- 1933–1943: Holy Cross

Thomas J. McCabe (died April 5, 1943) was an American sportswriter and college athletics administrator who served as graduate manager of athletics at the College of the Holy Cross from 1933 until his death in 1943.

== Early life ==
McCabe graduated from The English High School, where he played tackle on three consecutive championship football teams and set a city record in the 1000 yards. He then attended Phillips Exeter Academy, where he played end on the football team and was a member of the school's relay team. He played end on the Holy Cross Crusaders varsity football team all four years he attended the school. He was on the relay team his freshman year, but gave up the sport to seek employment. He graduated in 1915 and was the speaker at that year's commencement.

== Coaching ==
After graduating, McCabe became the football, baseball, and basketball coach at Boston College High School. He was chosen to succeed Charles Brickley as head coach of the Boston College Eagles football team in 1918, but World War I forced the school to abandon a traditional football season. When the program was revived in 1919, Frank Cavanaugh was chosen to coach the Eagles. In 1919, McCabe left BC High to become an English teacher at The English High School, a position he held until his death. He also served as a college football official. He served as president of the New England Football Officials Association and vice president of the Eastern Association of Intercollegiate Football Officials. In 1939 and 1940, McCabe was an unsuccessful candidate for school committee in Brookline, Massachusetts.

== Administration ==
In 1918, McCabe joined the Boston Herald as a sportswriter. He remained with the paper until 1933, when he became graduate manager of athletics at Holy Cross. In 1935 the Holy Cross Crusaders football team went undefeated, but were not invited to a bowl game. In 1938, Holy Cross rejected a bid to play in the Cotton Bowl Classic due to opposition from the school's president and because head coach Eddie Anderson was looking to leave the team. A month later, Anderson became head coach of the Iowa Hawkeyes and McCabe promoted assistant Joe Sheeketski to succeed him. Anderson protested Sheeketski's hiring, as Sheeketski had an oral agreement to join his staff in Iowa. Sheeketski left after the 1941 season and Ank Scanlan, a virtually unknown high school coach from Philadelphia was chosen as his replacement by McCabe and faculty moderator of athletics Timothy Phelan.

== Death ==
McCabe fell ill in January 1942 and was placed under the care of two nurses. He fell ill again in February 1943 and died on April 5, 1943, at his home in Brookline. He was 54 years old.
