= 1970 NFL draft =

Sports season drafting

General information
- Date: January 27–28, 1970
- Location: Belmont Plaza Hotel; New York City, NY

Overview
- 442 total selections in 17 rounds
- League: NFL
- First selection: Terry Bradshaw, QB; Pittsburgh Steelers
- Mr. Irrelevant: Rayford Jenkins, DB; Kansas City Chiefs
- Most selections (22): Atlanta Falcons, St. Louis Cardinals
- Fewest selections (13): New York Giants
- Hall of Famers: 4: QB Terry Bradshaw; CB Mel Blount; OL Jim Langer; S Cliff Harris

The 1970 NFL draft was the 35th National Football League draft and the first of the league's modern era, following the merger of the National Football League with the American Football League. It was held on January 27–28, 1970, at the Belmont Plaza Hotel in New York City, New York.

The first overall pick of the draft was quarterback Terry Bradshaw from Louisiana Tech University, who was taken by the Pittsburgh Steelers (after winning a coin flip with the Chicago Bears, who had the same record as Pittsburgh). Bradshaw was one of two future Pro Football Hall of Fame inductees drafted by the Steelers; the other being Mel Blount from Southern University in Round 3.

The last remaining active player from the 1970 draft class was kicker Mark Moseley, who played his final NFL game in the 1986 season, although he was absent in 1973.

== Player selections ==
*	= compensatory selection
†	= Pro Bowler
‡	= Hall of Famer

Positions key
Offense	Defense	Special teams
QB — Quarterback; RB — Running back; FB — Fullback; WR — Wide receiver; TE — Tight end; OL — Offensive lineman; T — Tackle; G — Guard; C — Center	DL — Defensive lineman; DT — Defensive tackle (Note: Includes nose tackle (NT)); DE — Defensive end; EDGE — Edge rusher; LB — Linebacker (Note: Includes middle linebacker (MLB/MIKE), weakside linebacker (WILL), strongside linebacker (SAM), off-ball linebacker, and outside linebacker (OLB)); DB — Defensive back; CB — Cornerback; S — Safety (Note: Includes free safety (FS) and strong safety (SS))	K — Kicker (Note: Also known as a placekicker (PK)); P — Punter; LS — Long snapper; RS — Return specialist (Note: Includes kickoff and punt returners)

=== Round 1–12 ===
Rnd.	Pick	Team	Player	Pos.	College	Notes
1	1	Pittsburgh Steelers	Terry Bradshaw^{‡}^{†}	QB	Louisiana Tech	
1	2	Green Bay Packers	Mike McCoy	DT	Notre Dame	from Chicago
1	3	Cleveland Browns	Mike Phipps	QB	Purdue	from Miami
1	4	Boston Patriots	Phil Olsen	DT	Utah State	
1	5	Buffalo Bills	Al Cowlings	LB	USC	
1	6	Philadelphia Eagles	Steve Zabel	TE/LB	Oklahoma	
1	7	Cincinnati Bengals	Mike Reid ^{†}	DT	Penn State	
1	8	St. Louis Cardinals	Larry Stegent	RB	Texas A&M	
1	9	San Francisco 49ers	Cedrick Hardman ^{†}	DE	North Texas State	
1	10	New Orleans Saints	Ken Burrough ^{†}	WR	Texas Southern	
1	11	Denver Broncos	Bobby Anderson	RB	Colorado	
1	12	Atlanta Falcons	John Small	LB	The Citadel	
1	13	New York Giants	Jim Files	LB	Oklahoma	
1	14	Houston Oilers	Doug Wilkerson ^{†}	G	North Carolina Central	
1	15	San Diego Chargers	Walker Gillette	WR	Richmond	
1	16	Green Bay Packers	Rich McGeorge	TE	Elon	
1	17	San Francisco 49ers	Bruce Taylor ^{†}	CB	Boston University	from Washington
1	18	Baltimore Colts	Norm Bulaich ^{†}	RB	TCU	
1	19	Detroit Lions	Steve Owens ^{†}	RB	Oklahoma	Heisman Trophy winner
1	20	New York Jets	Steve Tannen	DB	Florida	
1	21	Cleveland Browns	Bob McKay	T	Texas	
1	22	Los Angeles Rams	Jack Reynolds ^{†}	LB	Tennessee	
1	23	Dallas Cowboys	Duane Thomas	RB	West Texas A&M	
1	24	Oakland Raiders	Raymond Chester ^{†}	TE	Morgan State	
1	25	Minnesota Vikings	John Ward	T	Oklahoma State	
1	26	Kansas City Chiefs	Sid Smith	T	USC	
2	27	Dallas Cowboys	Bob Asher	T	Vanderbilt	from Chicago
2	28	Pittsburgh Steelers	Ronnie Shanklin ^{†}	WR	North Texas State	
2	29	Miami Dolphins	Jim Mandich	TE	Michigan	
2	30	Buffalo Bills	Dennis Shaw	QB	San Diego State	
2	31	Houston Oilers	Leo Brooks ^{†}	DT	Texas	from Boston
2	32	Cincinnati Bengals	Ron Carpenter	DT	NC State	
2	33	St. Louis Cardinals	Jim Corrigall	DT	Kent State	
2	34	Philadelphia Eagles	Ray Jones	CB	Southern	
2	35	Los Angeles Rams	Donnie Williams	WR	Prairie View A&M	
2	36	Cleveland Browns	Joe Jones	DE	Tennessee State	from New Orleans
2	37	Denver Broncos	Alden Roche	DE	Southern	
2	38	St. Louis Cardinals	Chuck Hutchison	G	Ohio State	from N. Y. Giants
2	39	Atlanta Falcons	Art Malone	RB	Arizona State	
2	40	Houston Oilers	Bill Dusenbery	RB	Johnson C. Smith	
2	41	Green Bay Packers	Al Matthews	S	Texas A&I	
2	42	San Diego Chargers	Tom Williams	DT	UC Davis	
2	43	Washington Redskins	Bill Brundige	DT	Colorado	
2	44	Baltimore Colts	Jim Bailey	DT	Kansas	
2	45	Detroit Lions	Ray Parson	T	Minnesota	
2	46	New York Jets	Rich Caster ^{†}	WR	Jackson State	
2	47	Cleveland Browns	Jerry Sherk ^{†}	DT	Oklahoma State	
2	48	San Francisco 49ers	John Isenbarger	RB	Indiana	from Los Angeles via Philadelphia
2	49	Dallas Cowboys	Margene Adkins	WR	Trinity Valley	
2	50	Oakland Raiders	Ted Koy	TE	Texas	
2	51	Minnesota Vikings	Bill Cappleman	QB	Florida State	
2	52	Kansas City Chiefs	Clyde Werner	LB	Washington	
3	53	Pittsburgh Steelers	Mel Blount^{‡}^{†}	CB	Southern	
3	54	Chicago Bears	George Farmer	WR	UCLA	
3	55	Miami Dolphins	Tim Foley ^{†}	CB	Purdue	
3	56	Boston Patriots	Mike Ballou	LB	UCLA	
3	57	Buffalo Bills	Jim Reilly	G	Notre Dame	
3	58	St. Louis Cardinals	Charlie Pittman	RB	Penn State	
3	59	Philadelphia Eagles	Lee Bouggess	RB	Louisville	
3	60	Cincinnati Bengals	Chip Bennett	LB	Abilene Christian	
3	61	Kansas City Chiefs	Billy Bob Barnett	DE	Texas A&M	from San Francisco
3	62	New Orleans Saints	Clovis Swinney	DE	Arkansas State	
3	63	Denver Broncos	John Kohler	T	South Dakota	
3	64	Atlanta Falcons	Andy Maurer	G	Oregon	
3	65	Atlanta Falcons	Todd Snyder	WR	Ohio	from N. Y. Giants
3	66	Dallas Cowboys	Charlie Waters ^{†}	S	Clemson	from Houston via Cleveland
3	67	Buffalo Bills	Glenn Alexander	DB	Grambling	from San Diego
3	68	Green Bay Packers	Jim Carter ^{†}	LB	Minnesota	
3	69	St. Louis Cardinals	Eric Harris	DB	Colorado	from Washington
3	70	Baltimore Colts	Jim O'Brien	K/WR	Cincinnati	
3	71	Detroit Lions	Jim Mitchell	DE	Virginia State	
3	72	New York Jets	Dennis Onkotz	LB	Penn State	
3	73	Dallas Cowboys	Steve Kiner	LB	Tennessee	from Cleveland
3	74	Baltimore Colts	Ara Person	TE	Morgan State	from Los Angeles via Philadelphia
3	75	Dallas Cowboys	Denton Fox	DB	Texas Tech	
3	76	Oakland Raiders	Gerald Irons	DE	Maryland State	
3	77	Minnesota Vikings	Chuck Burgoon	LB	North Park	
3	78	Kansas City Chiefs	David Hadley	DB	Alcorn A&M	
4	79	Chicago Bears	Lynn Larson	T	Kansas State	
4	80	Pittsburgh Steelers	Ed George	T	Wake Forest	
4	81	Miami Dolphins	Curtis Johnson	CB	Toledo	
4	82	Buffalo Bills	Jerome Gantt	DE	North Carolina Central	
4	83	Boston Patriots	Eddie Ray	DB	LSU	
4	84	Atlanta Falcons	Paul Reed	T	Johnson C. Smith	from Philadelphia
4	85	Cincinnati Bengals	Joe Stevens	G	Jackson State	
4	86	St. Louis Cardinals	Greg Lens	DT	Trinity	
4	87	San Francisco 49ers	Vic Washington ^{†}	WR	Wyoming	
4	88	New Orleans Saints	Delles Howell	CB	Grambling	
4	89	Denver Broncos	Jerry Hendren	WR	Idaho	
4	90	Pittsburgh Steelers	Jim Evenson	RB	Oregon	from N. Y. Giants
4	91	St. Louis Cardinals	Don Parish	LB	Stanford	from Atlanta
4	92	Houston Oilers	Spike Jones	P	Georgia	
4	93	Green Bay Packers	Ken Ellis ^{†}	WR	Southern	
4	94	San Diego Chargers	Bill Maddox	TE	Syracuse	
4	95	Baltimore Colts	Steve Smear	DT	Penn State	from Washington
4	96	Green Bay Packers	Skip Butler	K	Texas–Arlington	from Baltimore
4	97	New York Giants	Wes Grant	DE	UCLA	from Detroit
4	98	New York Jets	John Ebersole	LB	Penn State	
4	99	Cleveland Browns	Ricky Stevenson	DB	Arizona	
4	100	Chicago Bears	Ross Brupbacher	LB	Texas A&M	
4	101	Dallas Cowboys	John Fitzgerald	T	Boston College	
4	102	Oakland Raiders	Tony Cline	LB	Miami (FL)	
4	103	Washington Redskins	Paul Laaveg	T	Iowa	from Minnesota via Los Angeles and New Orleans
4	104	Cincinnati Bengals	Billie Hayes	DB	San Diego State	from Kansas City
5	105	Pittsburgh Steelers	Jon Staggers	WR	Missouri	
5	106	New Orleans Saints	Glenn Cannon	DB	Ole Miss	from Chicago
5	107	Boston Patriots	Bob Olson	LB	Notre Dame	from Miami
5	108	New York Jets	Clifford McClain	RB	South Carolina State	from Boston
5	109	Buffalo Bills	Steve Starnes	LB	Tampa	
5	110	Houston Oilers	Ron Saul	G	Michigan State	from Cincinnati via N. Y. Jets
5	111	St. Louis Cardinals	Tom Lloyd	T	Bowling Green	
5	112	Atlanta Falcons	Bruce Van Ness	RB	Rutgers	from Philadelphia via N. Y. Giants
5	113	San Francisco 49ers	Gary McArthur	T	USC	
5	114	Washington Redskins	Manny Sistrunk	DT	Arkansas AM&N	from New Orleans
5	115	Denver Broncos	Bill McKoy	LB	Purdue	
5	116	Atlanta Falcons	Ken Mendenhall	C	Oklahoma	
5	117	New York Giants	Claude Brumfield	G	Tennessee State	
5	118	Houston Oilers	Ed Duley	DT	Northern Arizona	
5	119	San Diego Chargers	Pettus Farrar	RB	Norfolk State	
5	120	Green Bay Packers	Cecil Pryor	DE	Michigan	
5	121	Washington Redskins	Danny Pierce	RB	Memphis State	
5	122	Baltimore Colts	Billy Newsome	DE	Grambling	
5	123	Detroit Lions	Bob Parker	G	Memphis State	
5	124	New York Jets	Gary Arthur	TE	Miami (OH)	
5	125	Cleveland Browns	Steve Engel	RB	Colorado	
5	126	New Orleans Saints	Steve Ramsey	QB	North Texas State	from Los Angeles
5	127	St. Louis Cardinals	Barry Pierson	DB	Michigan	
5	128	Oakland Raiders	Art Laster	T	Maryland State	
5	129	Minnesota Vikings	Greg Jones	RB	UCLA	
5	130	Kansas City Chiefs	Mike Oriard	C	Notre Dame	
6	131	Pittsburgh Steelers	Manuel Barrera	LB	Kansas State	
6	132	Miami Dolphins	Dave Campbell	DE	Auburn	
6	133	Chicago Bears	Bob Cutburth	QB	Oklahoma State	
6	134	Buffalo Bills	Ken Edwards	RB	Virginia Tech	
6	135	Buffalo Bills	Grant Guthrie	K	Florida State	from Boston
6	136	St. Louis Cardinals	James Manuel	T	Toledo	from Philadelphia
6	137	Cincinnati Bengals	Sandy Durko	S	USC	
6	138	San Francisco 49ers	Rusty Clark	QB	Houston	
6	139	Chicago Bears	Jeff Curchin	T	Florida State	from St. Louis
6	140	New Orleans Saints	Mel Easley	DB	Oregon State	
6	141	Denver Broncos	John Mosier	TE	Kansas	
6	142	New York Giants	Duane Miller	WR	Drake	
6	143	Atlanta Falcons	Mack Herron	RB	Kansas State	
6	144	Houston Oilers	Benny Johnson	CB	Johnson C. Smith	
6	145	Green Bay Packers	Ervin Hunt	DB	Fresno State	
6	146	San Diego Chargers	Billy Parks	WR	Long Beach State	
6	147	Atlanta Falcons	Jade Butcher	WR	Indiana	from Washington
6	148	Baltimore Colts	Ron Gardin	CB	Arizona	
6	149	Detroit Lions	Tony Terry	DT	USC	
6	150	New York Jets	Terry Stewart	DB	Arkansas	
6	151	Cleveland Browns	Mike Cilek	QB	Iowa	
6	152	Atlanta Falcons	Randy Marshall	DE	Linfield	from Los Angeles
6	153	Dallas Cowboys	Pat Toomay	DE	Vanderbilt	
6	154	Oakland Raiders	Alvin Wyatt	CB	Bethune–Cookman	
6	155	Pittsburgh Steelers	Clarence Kegler	T	South Carolina State	
6	156	Kansas City Chiefs	Robert Hews	T	Princeton	
7	157	Pittsburgh Steelers	Danny Griffin	RB	Texas–Arlington	
7	158	Philadelphia Eagles	Terry Brennan	T	Notre Dame	from Chicago
7	159	Miami Dolphins	Jake Scott ^{†}	S	Georgia	
7	160	Boston Patriots	Odell Lawson	RB	Langston	
7	161	Buffalo Bills	Wayne Fowler	T	Richmond	
7	162	Los Angeles Rams	Ted Provost	CB	Ohio State	
7	163	Cincinnati Bengals	Lemar Parrish ^{†}	CB	Lincoln	
7	164	St. Louis Cardinals	Jim McFarland	TE	Nebraska	
7	165	San Francisco 49ers	Jim Strong	RB	Houston	
7	166	New Orleans Saints	Lon Woodard	DE	San Diego State	
7	167	Denver Broncos	Randy Montgomery	CB	Weber State	
7	168	Los Angeles Rams	Bill Nelson	DT	Oregon State	from Atlanta
7	169	Atlanta Falcons	Gary Orcutt	WR	USC	N. Y. Giants
7	170	Houston Oilers	Charles Olson	DB	Concordia (Moorhead)	
7	171	San Diego Chargers	Jim Fabish	DB	UTEP	
7	172	Green Bay Packers	Cleo Walker	C	Louisville	
7	173	Washington Redskins	Roland Merritt	WR	Maryland	
7	174	Baltimore Colts	Gordon Slade	QB	Davidson	
7	175	Detroit Lions	Ken Geddes	LB	Nebraska	
7	176	New York Jets	James Williams	DB	Virginia State	
7	177	Cleveland Browns	Craig Wycinsky	G	Michigan State	
7	178	Washington Redskins	James Harris	CB	Howard Payne	from Los Angeles
7	179	Dallas Cowboys	Don Abbey	LB	Penn State	
7	180	Oakland Raiders	Steve Svitak	LB	Boise State	
7	181	Minnesota Vikings	Hap Farber	LB	Ole Miss	
7	182	Kansas City Chiefs	Clyde Glosson	WR	UTEP	
8	183	Chicago Bears	Dana Stephenson	DB	Nebraska	
8	184	Pittsburgh Steelers	Dave Smith	WR	IUP	
8	185	Miami Dolphins	Narvel Chavers	RB	Jackson State	
8	186	Buffalo Bills	Richard Cheek	T	Auburn	
8	187	New York Jets	Jack Porter	G	Oklahoma	from Boston
8	188	Cincinnati Bengals	Bill Trout	DT	Miami (FL)	
8	189	St. Louis Cardinals	Tom Banks ^{†}	C	Auburn	
8	190	Philadelphia Eagles	Ira Gordon	T	Kansas State	
8	191	San Francisco 49ers	Carter Campbell	LB	Weber State	
8	192	New Orleans Saints	Lawrence Estes	DE	Alcorn A&M	
8	193	Kansas City Chiefs	Fred Barry	DB	Boston University	from Denver
8	194	Atlanta Falcons	Larry Brewer	TE	Louisiana Tech	from N. Y. Giants
8	195	Atlanta Falcons	Seth Miller	S	Arizona State	
8	196	Houston Oilers	Mike McClish	T	Wisconsin	
8	197	Green Bay Packers	Tim Mjos	RB	North Dakota State	
8	198	San Diego Chargers	Wayne Clark	QB	United States International	
8	199	Baltimore Colts	Bob Bouley	T	Boston College	
8	200	Washington Redskins	Paul Johnson	DB	Penn State	
8	201	St. Louis Cardinals	Mike Holmgren	QB	USC	from Detroit
8	202	New York Jets	Mark Lomas	DE	Northern Arizona	
8	203	Cleveland Browns	Honester Davidson	DB	Bowling Green	
8	204	Los Angeles Rams	Rich Saul ^{†}	LB	Michigan State	
8	205	Dallas Cowboys	Jerry Dossey	G	Arkansas	
8	206	Oakland Raiders	Mike Wynn	DE	Nebraska	
8	207	Minnesota Vikings	Mike Carroll	G	Missouri	
8	208	Denver Broncos	Louis Porter	RB	Southern	from Kansas City
9	209	Pittsburgh Steelers	Carl Crennel	LB	West Virginia	
9	210	Chicago Bears	Linzy Cole	WR	TCU	
9	211	Miami Dolphins	Hubert Ginn	RB	Florida A&M	
9	212	Boston Patriots	Dennis Wirgowski	DE	Purdue	
9	213	Buffalo Bills	Bill Bridges	G	Houston	
9	214	St. Louis Cardinals	Paul White	RB	UTEP	
9	215	Philadelphia Eagles	David King	LB	Stephen F. Austin	
9	216	Cincinnati Bengals	Bill Bolden	RB	UCLA	
9	217	San Francisco 49ers	Preston Riley	WR	Memphis State	
9	218	New Orleans Saints	Jim Otis ^{†}	RB	Ohio State	
9	219	Denver Broncos	David Washington ^{†}	LB	Alcorn A&M	
9	220	Atlanta Falcons	Roy Robinson	DB	Montana	
9	221	New York Giants	Pat Hughes	C	Boston University	
9	222	Houston Oilers	Charlie Blossom	DE	Texas Southern	
9	223	San Diego Chargers	Chris Fletcher	CB	Temple	
9	224	Green Bay Packers	Bob Reinhard	G	Stanford	
9	225	Washington Redskins	Ralph Sonntag	T	Maryland	
9	226	Baltimore Colts	Barney Harris	DB	Texas A&M	
9	227	Detroit Lions	Herman Weaver	P	Tennessee	
9	228	New York Jets	Eddie Bell	WR	Idaho State	
9	229	Cleveland Browns	Geoff Brown	LB	Pittsburgh	
9	230	Los Angeles Rams	David Graham	T	New Mexico Highlands	
9	231	Dallas Cowboys	Zenon Andrusyshyn	K	UCLA	
9	232	Oakland Raiders	Ike Hill	DB	Catawba	
9	233	Minnesota Vikings	George Morrow	DE	Ole Miss	
9	234	Kansas City Chiefs	Charley Evans	T	Texas Tech	
10	235	Chicago Bears	Glen Holloway	G	North Texas State	
10	236	Pittsburgh Steelers	Isaiah Brown	DB	Stanford	
10	237	Miami Dolphins	Dick Nittenger	G	Tampa	
10	238	Buffalo Bills	Willie Dixon	DB	Albany State	
10	239	Boston Patriots	Henry Brown	K	Missouri	
10	240	Philadelphia Eagles	Steve Jaggard	DB	Memphis State	
10	241	Cincinnati Bengals	Nick Roman	LB	Ohio State	
10	242	St. Louis Cardinals	Tony Plummer	S	Pacific	
10	243	San Francisco 49ers	Larry Schreiber	RB	Tennessee Tech	
10	244	New Orleans Saints	Jim Brumfield	RB	Indiana State	
10	245	New York Giants	Matt Fortier	DE	Fairmont State	
10	246	Atlanta Falcons	Jim Hatcher	DB	Kansas	
10	247	Denver Broncos	Maurice Fullerton	DT	Tuskegee	
10	248	Green Bay Packers	Russ Melby	DT	Weber State	
10	249	Houston Oilers	Joe Dawkins	RB	Wisconsin	
10	250	San Diego Chargers	Mac Steen	G	Florida	
10	251	Green Bay Packers	Frank Patrick	TE	Nebraska	from Washington
10	252	Baltimore Colts	Dick Palmer	LB	Kentucky	
10	253	Detroit Lions	Bruce Maxwell	RB	Arkansas	
10	254	New York Jets	Cleve Dickerson	RB	Miami (OH)	
10	255	Cleveland Browns	Bill Yanchar	DT	Purdue	
10	256	Los Angeles Rams	Vince Opalsky	RB	Miami (FL)	
10	257	Dallas Cowboys	Pete Athas	S	Tennessee	
10	258	Oakland Raiders	Gordon Bosserman	T	UCLA	
10	259	Minnesota Vikings	Stu Voigt	TE	Wisconsin	
10	260	Kansas City Chiefs	Bob Stankovich	G	Arkansas	
11	261	Pittsburgh Steelers	Calvin Hunt	C	Baylor	
11	262	Chicago Bears	Ted Rose	TE	Northern Michigan	
11	263	Miami Dolphins	Brownie Wheless	T	Rice	
11	264	Boston Patriots	Dennis Bramlett	T	UTEP	
11	265	Buffalo Bills	Terry Williams	RB	Grambling	
11	266	Cincinnati Bengals	Samuel Wallace	T	Grambling	
11	267	St. Louis Cardinals	Mike Siwek	DT	Western Michigan	
11	268	Philadelphia Eagles	Bill Walik	DB	Villanova	
11	269	San Francisco 49ers	Danny Crockett	WR	Toledo	
11	270	New Orleans Saints	Gary Klahr	LB	Arizona	
11	271	Denver Broncos	Cleve Bryant	DB	Ohio	
11	272	Atlanta Falcons	Mike Brunson	RB	Arizona State	
11	273	New York Giants	Alan Pitcaithley	RB	Oregon	
11	274	Houston Oilers	Robert Morris	C	Duke	
11	275	San Diego Chargers	Jack Protz	LB	Syracuse	
11	276	Green Bay Packers	Dan Hook	LB	Humboldt State	
11	277	Washington Redskins	Mack Alston	TE	Maryland State	
11	278	Baltimore Colts	George Edwards	RB	Fairmont State	
11	279	Detroit Lions	Roger Laird	DB	Kentucky State	
11	280	New York Jets	Earlie Thomas	CB	Colorado State	
11	281	Cleveland Browns	Gene Benner	WR	Maine	
11	282	Los Angeles Rams	David Bookert	RB	New Mexico	
11	283	Dallas Cowboys	Ivan Southerland	T	Clemson	
11	284	Oakland Raiders	Emery Hicks	LB	Kansas	
11	285	Kansas City Chiefs	Bill O'Neal	RB	Grambling	
11	286	Minnesota Vikings	Godfrey Zaunbrecher	C	LSU	
12	287	Chicago Bears	Butch Davis	DB	Missouri	
12	288	Pittsburgh Steelers	Rick Sharp	DT	Washington	
12	289	Miami Dolphins	Mike Kolen	LB	Auburn	
12	290	Buffalo Bills	Dave Simpson	T	Drake	
12	291	Boston Patriots	Greg Roero	DT	New Mexico Highlands	
12	292	St. Louis Cardinals	Charles Collins	WR	Kansas State	
12	293	Philadelphia Eagles	Robert Jones	DT	Grambling	
12	294	Cincinnati Bengals	Thomas Truesdell	DE	Ohio Wesleyan	
12	295	San Francisco 49ers	Bill Tant	T	Dayton	
12	296	New Orleans Saints	Willie Davenport	DB	Southern	
12	297	Denver Broncos	Greg Jones	RB	Whitewater State	
12	298	New York Giants	Larry Nels	LB	Wyoming	
12	299	Atlanta Falcons	Lonnie Holton	RB	Northern Michigan	
12	300	Houston Oilers	Richard Dawkins	TE	Johnson C. Smith	
12	301	Green Bay Packers	Frank Foreman	WR	Michigan State	
12	302	San Diego Chargers	Howard Gravelle	TE	UC Davis	
12	303	Washington Redskins	James Kates	LB	Penn State	
12	304	Baltimore Colts	Don Burrell	WR	Angelo State	
12	305	Detroit Lions	Emanuel Murrell	DB	Cal Poly	
12	306	New York Jets	Bill Pierson	C	San Diego State	
12	307	Cleveland Browns	Jerry Don Sanders	K	Texas Tech	
12	308	Los Angeles Rams	Larry Arnold	QB	Hawaii	
12	309	Dallas Cowboys	Joe Williams	RB	Wyoming	
12	310	Oakland Raiders	Gary DeLoach	G	UC Davis	
12	311	Minnesota Vikings	James Holland	DB	Jackson State	
12	312	Kansas City Chiefs	Rodney Fedorchak	G	Pittsburgh	

=== Round 13 ===
Pick #	NFL team	Player	Position	College
313	Pittsburgh Steelers	Billy Main	Running back	Oregon State
314	Chicago Bears	Jimmy Gunn	Linebacker	USC
315	Miami Dolphins	Dave Buddington	Running back	Springfield (Mass.)
316	Boston Patriots	Ronnie Shelly	Defensive back	Troy State
317	Buffalo Bills	Steve Schroeder	Kicker	Pacific
318	Philadelphia Eagles	Richard Stevens	Offensive tackle	Baylor
319	Cincinnati Bengals	Paul Dunn	Wide receiver	U.S. International
320	St. Louis Cardinals	Jack Thomas	Guard	Mississippi State
321	San Francisco 49ers	Jim Vanderslice	Linebacker	Texas Christian
322	New Orleans Saints	Ralph Miller	Tight end	Alabama State
323	Denver Broncos	Jim McKoy	Defensive back	Parsons (Iowa)
324	Atlanta Falcons	Rich Stepanek	Defensive tackle	Iowa
325	New York Giants	Gary Inskeep	Tackle	Wisconsin–Stout
326	Houston Oilers	Jess Lewis	Linebacker	Oregon State
327	San Diego Chargers	Bernard Bradley	Defensive back	Utah State
328	Green Bay Packers	Dave Smith	Running back	Utah
329	Washington Redskins	Joe Patterson	Tackle	Lawrence
330	Baltimore Colts	Dave Polak	Linebacker	Bowling Green
331	Detroit Lions	Dave Haverdick	Defensive tackle	Morehead State
332	New York Jets	Walter Groth	Defensive tackle	Baylor
333	Cleveland Browns	Larry Roberts	Running back	Central Missouri State
334	Los Angeles Rams	Melvin Jones	Wide receiver	Florida A&M
335	Dallas Cowboys	Mark Washington	Cornerback	Morgan State
336	Oakland Raiders	Don Highsmith	Running back	Michigan State
337	Minnesota Vikings	Robert Pearce	Defensive back	Stephen F. Austin
338	Kansas City Chiefs	Troy Patridge	Defensive end	Texas-Arlington

=== Round 14 ===
Pick #	NFL team	Player	Position	College
339	Chicago Bears	Jim Morgan	Wide receiver	Henderson State
340	Pittsburgh Steelers	Bert Askson	Linebacker	Texas Southern
341	Miami Dolphins	Gary Brackett	Guard	Holy Cross
342	Buffalo Bills	William Costen	Tackle	Morris Brown
343	Boston Patriots	Garvie Craw	Running back	Michigan
344	Cincinnati Bengals	Joe Johnson	Wide receiver	Johnson C. Smith
345	St. Louis Cardinals	Ray Groth	Wide receiver	Utah
346	Philadelphia Eagles	Mark Moseley	Kicker	Stephen F. Austin
347	San Francisco 49ers	Jack King	Guard	Clemson
348	New Orleans Saints	Doug Sutherland	Defensive end	Wisconsin–Superior
349	Denver Broncos	Jeff Slipp	Linebacker	Brigham Young
350	New York Giants	Rodney Brand	Center	Arkansas
351	Atlanta Falcons	Chuck Wald	Wide receiver	North Dakota State
352	Houston Oilers	Claire Rasmussen	Guard	Wisconsin–Oshkosh
353	Green Bay Packers	Bob Lints	Guard	Eastern Michigan
354	San Diego Chargers	Tyrone Caldwell	Defensive tackle	South Carolina State
355	Washington Redskins	Tony Moro	Running back	Dayton
356	Baltimore Colts	Tom Curtis	Defensive back	Michigan
357	Detroit Lions	Charlie Brown	Wide receiver	Northern Arizona
358	New York Jets	John Little	Linebacker	Oklahoma State
359	Cleveland Browns	Jim Tharpe	Linebacker	Lincoln (MO)
360	Los Angeles Rams	Bob Geddes	Linebacker	UCLA
361	Dallas Cowboys	Julian Martin	Wide receiver	North Carolina Central
362	Oakland Raiders	Don Riley	Kicker	Auburn
363	Minnesota Vikings	Tommy Spinks	Wide receiver	Louisiana Tech
364	Kansas City Chiefs	Glenn Dumont	Running back	American International

=== Round 15 ===
Pick #	NFL team	Player	Position	College
365	Pittsburgh Steelers	Glen Keppy	Defensive tackle	Wisconsin–Platteville
366	Chicago Bears	Phil Abraira	Defensive back	Florida State
367	Miami Dolphins	Pat Hauser	Wide receiver	East Tennessee State
368	Boston Patriots	Kent Schoolfield	Wide receiver	Florida A&M
369	Buffalo Bills	Dave Farris	Tight end	Central Michigan
370	St. Louis Cardinals	Ron Wilson	Wide receiver	Western Illinois
371	Philadelphia Eagles	John Carlos	Wide receiver	San Jose State
372	Cincinnati Bengals	Marvin Weeks	Defensive back	Alcorn A&M
373	San Francisco 49ers	Dave Delsignore	Wide receiver	Youngstown State
374	New Orleans Saints	Jim Vest	Defensive end	Washington State
375	Denver Broncos	Maher Barakat	Kicker	South Dakota Tech
376	Atlanta Falcons	Keith Mauney	Defensive back	Princeton
377	New York Giants	Warren Muir	Running back	South Carolina
378	Houston Oilers	David Sharp	Tackle	Stanford
379	San Diego Chargers	Eugene Childs	Running back	Texas-El Paso
380	Green Bay Packers	Mike Carter	Wide receiver	Sacramento State
381	Washington Redskins	Vic Lewandowski	Center	Holy Cross
382	Baltimore Colts	Phillip Gary	Defensive end	Kentucky State
383	Detroit Lions	Bob Haney	Tackle	Idaho
384	New York Jets	Tom Bayless	Defensive tackle	Purdue
385	Cleveland Browns	Guy Homoly	Defensive back	Illinois State
386	Los Angeles Rams	Dag Azam	Guard	West Texas State
387	Dallas Cowboys	Ken DeLong	Tight end	Tennessee
388	Oakland Raiders	Fred Moore	Wide receiver	Washington State
389	Minnesota Vikings	Bennie Francis	Defensive end	Chadron St. (Neb.)
390	Kansas City Chiefs	Bob Liggett	Defensive tackle	Nebraska

=== Round 16 ===
Pick #	NFL team	Player	Position	College
391	Chicago Bears	Robert Helterbran	Guard	North Texas State
392	Pittsburgh Steelers	Frank Yanossy	Defensive tackle	Tennessee
393	Miami Dolphins	Charles Williams	Guard	Tennessee State
394	Buffalo Bills	Larry Davis	Wide receiver	Rice
395	Boston Patriots	Otis McDaniel	Defensive end	Tuskegee
396	Philadelphia Eagles	Tuufuli Uperesa	Tackle	Montana
397	Cincinnati Bengals	Larry Ely	Linebacker	Iowa
398	St. Louis Cardinals	Gary Fowler	Running back	California
399	San Francisco 49ers	Scott Perkins	Defensive back	Livingstone (N.C.)
400	New Orleans Saints	Cliff Gasper	Defensive tackle	Grambling
401	Denver Broncos	Bob Stewart	Quarterback	Northern Arizona
402	New York Giants	Vic Nolting	Defensive back	Xavier
403	Atlanta Falcons	Steve Parnell	Wide receiver	Massachusetts
404	Houston Oilers	Chris Myers	Wide receiver	Kenyon
405	Green Bay Packers	Jim Heacock	Defensive back	Muskingum
406	San Diego Chargers	Mike Green	Running back	Nebraska
407	Washington Redskins	Steve Bushore	Wide receiver	Emporia State
408	Baltimore Colts	Jack Maitland	Running back	Williams
409	Detroit Lions	Jerry Todd	Defensive back	Memphis State
410	New York Jets	Claude Herard	Defensive tackle	Mississippi
411	Cleveland Browns	John Redebaugh	Tight end	Bemidji State
412	Los Angeles Rams	Roland Reichardt	Kicker	West Texas State
413	Dallas Cowboys	Seabern Hill	Defensive back	Arizona State
414	Oakland Raiders	Tim Roth	Defensive back	South Dakota State
415	Minnesota Vikings	Bruce Cerone	Wide receiver	Emporia State
416	Kansas City Chiefs	Randy Ross	Linebacker	Kansas State

=== Round 17 ===
Pick #	NFL team	Player	Position	College
417	Pittsburgh Steelers	Harry Key	Tight end	Mississippi Valley State
418	Chicago Bears	Joe Brunson	Defensive tackle	Furman
419	Miami Dolphins	George Myles	Defensive tackle	Morris Brown
420	Boston Patriots	Joe Killingsworth	Wide receiver	Oklahoma
421	Buffalo Bills	George Bevan	Linebacker	LSU
422	Cincinnati Bengals	Richard Smith	Running back	Washington State
423	St. Louis Cardinals	Cliff Powell	Linebacker	Arkansas
424	Philadelphia Eagles	Mike Sizelove	Tight end	Idaho
425	San Francisco 49ers	Mike Culton	Punter	LaVerne
426	New Orleans Saints	Doug Wyatt	Defensive back	Tulsa
427	Denver Broncos	Frank Kalfoss	Kicker	Montana State
428	Atlanta Falcons	Bill Bell	Kicker	Kansas
429	New York Giants	Walter Breaux	Defensive tackle	Grambling
430	Houston Oilers	Julian Fagan	Punter	Mississippi
431	San Diego Chargers	David Sanks	Guard	Louisville
432	Green Bay Packers	Larry Krause	Running back	St. Norbert
433	Washington Redskins	Earl Maxfield	Defensive tackle	Baylor
434	Baltimore Colts	Alvin Pearman	Wide receiver	Colgate
435	Detroit Lions	Jim Marshall	Defensive tackle	Centenary
436	New York Jets	Dick Beard	Running back	Kentucky
437	Cleveland Browns	Charles Tabb	Running back	McMurry
438	Los Angeles Rams	Don Crenshaw	Defensive back	USC
439	Dallas Cowboys	Glenn Patterson	Center	Nebraska
440	Oakland Raiders	Eric Stolberg	Wide receiver	Indiana
441	Minnesota Vikings	Brian Healy	Defensive back	Michigan
442	Kansas City Chiefs	Rayford Jenkins	Defensive back	Alcorn A&M

== Notable undrafted players ==
^{†}	Pro Bowler (Note: Players are identified as a Pro Bowler if they were selected for the Pro Bowl at any time in their career.)	‡	Hall of Famer

Original NFL team	Player	Pos.	College	Notes
Atlanta Falcons	Sonny Campbell	RB	Northern Arizona	
Atlanta Falcons	Mike Lewis	DT	Arkansas AM&N	
Buffalo Bills	Al Andrews	LB	New Mexico State	
Buffalo Bills	Tommy Pharr	DB	Mississippi State	
Cincinnati Bengals	Jim Del Gaizo	QB	Tampa	
Cincinnati Bengals	Doug Dressler	RB	Chico State	
Cincinnati Bengals	Mike Kelly	TE	Davidson	
Cleveland Browns	Jim Langer^{‡}	C	South Dakota State	
Dallas Cowboys	Cliff Harris^{‡}^{†}	S	Ouachita Baptist	
Dallas Cowboys	Ken Johnson	T	Indiana	
Dallas Cowboys	Doug Mooers	DE	Whittier	
Houston Oilers	Claude Harvey	LB	Prairie View A&M	
Los Angeles Rams	Sam Adams	G	Prairie View A&M	
Los Angeles Rams	Otis Sistrunk ^{†}	DE	University of Mars	
Los Angeles Rams	Creston Whitaker	WR	North Texas	
Miami Dolphins	Doug Swift	LB	Amherst	
New England Patriots	Dan Kecman	LB	Maryland	
New York Giants	Ed Baker	QB	Lafayette	
New York Giants	Joe Green	S	Bowling Green	
Oakland Raiders	Carl Weathers	LB	San Diego State	
Philadelphia Eagles	Rick Arrington	QB	Tulsa	
Philadelphia Eagles	Carl Gersbach	LB	West Chester State	
Philadelphia Eagles	Jim Thrower	DB	Texas A&M–Commerce	
Pittsburgh Steelers	Dennis Hughes	TE	Georgia	
Pittsburgh Steelers	Dave Kalina	WR	Miami (FL)	
Pittsburgh Steelers	Bob Leahy	QB	Emporia State	
Pittsburgh Steelers	Ron McBride	RB	Missouri	
San Diego Chargers	Harris Jones	G	Johnson C. Smith	
Washington Redskins	Terry Hermeling	T	Nevada	
Washington Redskins	Jon Jaqua	S	Lewis & Clark	
Washington Redskins	Rusty Tillman	LB	Northern Arizona	
Denver Broncos	Jack Dolbin	WR	Wake Forest	

== Hall of Famers ==
- Terry Bradshaw, quarterback from Louisiana Tech, taken 1st round 1st overall by Pittsburgh Steelers

Inducted: Professional Football Hall of Fame class of 1989.

- Mel Blount, cornerback from Southern, taken 3rd round 53rd overall by Pittsburgh Steelers

Inducted: Professional Football Hall of Fame class of 1989.

- Jim Langer, offensive lineman from South Dakota State, undrafted and signed by Miami Dolphins

Inducted: Professional Football Hall of Fame class of 1987.

- Cliff Harris, safety from Ouachita Baptist College, undrafted and signed by Dallas Cowboys

Inducted: Professional Football Hall of Fame class of 2020.
