= 1969 NAIA football season =

American college football season

- Regular season: August–November 1969
- Postseason: November 29–December 13, 1969
- National Championship: Kingsville, TX
- Champion: Texas A&I (2)

The 1969 NAIA football season was the 14th season of college football sponsored by the NAIA.

The season was played from August to November 1969, culminating in the 1969 NAIA Championship Bowl, played this year on December 13, 1969 in Kingsville, Texas.

Texas A&I defeated Concordia–Moorhead in the Championship Bowl, 32–7, to win their second NAIA national title.

Following the season, the NAIA split its football championship into Division I and Division II.

== Conference realignment ==
=== Conference changes ===
- This was the final season for the Oregon Collegiate Conference. After the end of play, its four remaining members, all from Oregon, would depart to join the Evergreen Conference. The expanded conference would include eight members from Oregon and Washington.

=== Membership changes ===
Team	1968 conference	1969 conference
Emporia State	Central Intercollegiate	Rocky Mountain
Fort Hays State	Central Intercollegiate	Rocky Mountain
Nebraska–Omaha	Central Intercollegiate	Rocky Mountain
Pittsburg State	Central Intercollegiate	Rocky Mountain
Washburn	Central Intercollegiate	Rocky Mountain

== Conference standings ==
1969 Arkansas Intercollegiate Conference football standings
	Conf.					Overall
Team	W		L		T	W		L		T
Henderson State $	5	–	1	–	0	8	–	2	–	0
Arkansas Tech	4	–	1	–	1	6	–	4	–	1
Harding	4	–	2	–	0	7	–	2	–	1
State College of Arkansas	3	–	3	–	0	5	–	5	–	0
Ouachita Baptist	2	–	4	–	0	5	–	5	–	0
Southern Arkansas	2	–	4	–	0	4	–	6	–	0
Arkansas A&M	0	–	5	–	1	2	–	6	–	1
$ – Conference champion

1969 Carolinas Conference football standings
	Conf.					Overall
Team	W		L		T	W		L		T
Elon $	5	–	0	–	0	7	–	3	–	0
Lenoir Rhyne	4	–	1	–	0	6	–	4	–	0
Presbyterian	3	–	2	–	0	5	–	6	–	0
Newberry	2	–	3	–	0	5	–	5	–	0
Catawba	1	–	4	–	0	2	–	8	–	0
Guilford	0	–	5	–	0	2	–	7	–	0
$ – Conference champion; Catawba forfeited wins over Newberry, Elon, and Presbyterian. Guilford forfeited wins over Newberry and Catawba.

1969 College Conference of Illinois and Wisconsin football standings
	Conf.					Overall
Team	W		L		T	W		L		T
No. 17 Carthage $	7	–	0	–	0	9	–	0	–	0
Augustana (IL)	6	–	1	–	0	7	–	2	–	0
Millikin	4	–	3	–	0	4	–	5	–	0
Elmhurst	3	–	4	–	0	4	–	4	–	0
Carroll (WI)	3	–	4	–	0	4	–	5	–	0
Illinois Wesleyan	3	–	4	–	0	3	–	6	–	0
North Park	2	–	5	–	0	2	–	7	–	0
North Central (IL)	0	–	7	–	0	0	–	9	–	0
$ – Conference champion; Rankings from NAIA poll

1969 Eastern Football Conference football standings
	Conf.					Overall
Team	W		L		T	W		L		T
Bridgeport $	4	–	0	–	0	8	–	2	–	0
Montclair State	3	–	1	–	0	8	–	2	–	0
Glassboro State	2	–	2	–	0	5	–	3	–	0
Central Connecticut State	1	–	3	–	0	5	–	4	–	0
Southern Connecticut State	0	–	4	–	0	1	–	8	–	0
$ – Conference champion

1969 Evergreen Conference football standings
	Conf.					Overall
Team	W		L		T	W		L		T
Western Washington +	4	–	2	–	0	5	–	4	–	0
Eastern Washington +	4	–	2	–	0	4	–	5	–	0
Central Washington	3	–	3	–	0	3	–	6	–	0
Whitworth	1	–	5	–	0	1	–	8	–	0
+ – Conference co-champions

1969 Frontier Conference football standings
	Conf.					Overall
Team	W		L		T	W		L		T
Western Montana $	5	–	0	–	0	7	–	0	–	0
Eastern Montana	4	–	1	–	0	5	–	4	–	0
Montana Tech	2	–	2	–	1	4	–	3	–	1
Northern Montana	2	–	3	–	0	2	–	6	–	0
Carroll (MT)	1	–	3	–	1	2	–	5	–	1
Rocky Mountain	0	–	5	–	0	1	–	7	–	0
$ – Conference champion

1969 Gateway Conference football standings
	Conf.					Overall
Team	W		L		T	W		L		T
Lakeland $	4	–	0	–	0	8	–	1	–	0
Milton	3	–	1	–	0	?	–	?	–	?
Northwestern (WI)	1	–	3	–	0	?	–	?	–	?
Eureka	1	–	3	–	0	1	–	7	–	0
St. Procopius	1	–	3	–	0	1	–	7	–	0
$ – Conference champion

1969 Hoosier Conference football standings
	Conf.					Overall
Team	W		L		T	W		L		T
Anderson (IN) $	6	–	0	–	0	8	–	1	–	0
Hanover	4	–	2	–	0	6	–	3	–	0
Earlham	3	–	3	–	0	5	–	4	–	0
Franklin (IN)	3	–	3	–	0	4	–	4	–	1
Manchester (IN)	2	–	4	–	0	3	–	5	–	0
Taylor	2	–	4	–	0	3	–	6	–	0
Indiana Central	1	–	5	–	0	1	–	8	–	0
$ – Conference champion

1969 Iowa Conference football standings
	Conf.					Overall
Team	W		L		T	W		L		T
Simpson (IA) $	6	–	1	–	0	8	–	2	–	0
Luther	5	–	2	–	0	7	–	2	–	0
Central (IA)	5	–	2	–	0	6	–	3	–	0
William Penn	4	–	3	–	0	6	–	3	–	0
Upper Iowa	3	–	4	–	0	3	–	5	–	0
Wartburg	3	–	4	–	0	3	–	6	–	0
Buena Vista	2	–	5	–	0	2	–	7	–	0
Dubuque	0	–	7	–	0	1	–	7	–	0
$ – Conference champion

1969 Kansas Collegiate Athletic Conference football standings
	Conf.					Overall
Team	W		L		T	W		L		T
North Division
Kansas Wesleyan xy$	5	–	0	–	0	8	–	2	–	0
Baker	3	–	2	–	0	6	–	3	–	0
Ottawa	3	–	2	–	0	5	–	4	–	0
Bethany	2	–	3	–	0	4	–	5	–	0
Tabor	2	–	3	–	0	2	–	6	–	0
McPherson	0	–	5	–	0	0	–	8	–	0
South Division
St. Mary of the Plains x	5	–	0	–	0	7	–	2	–	0
Southwestern (KS)	3	–	2	–	0	6	–	3	–	0
Sterling y	3	–	2	–	0	5	–	5	–	0
Bethel (KS)	2	–	3	–	0	4	–	5	–	0
Friends	1	–	4	–	0	4	–	4	–	0
College of Emporia	1	–	4	–	0	1	–	7	–	0
Championship: Kansas Wesleyan 34, Sterling 21
$ – Conference champion; x – Division champion/co-champions; y – Championship game participant

1969 Lone Star Conference football standings
	Conf.					Overall
Team	W		L		T	W		L		T
No. 1/11 Texas A&I +^	6	–	1	–	0	11	–	1	–	0
East Texas State +	6	–	1	–	0	7	–	3	–	0
Stephen F. Austin	5	–	2	–	0	7	–	3	–	0
Southwest Texas State	3	–	4	–	0	3	–	6	–	1
Sul Ross	3	–	3	–	1	4	–	5	–	1
Sam Houston State	2	–	4	–	1	3	–	6	–	1
Howard Payne	2	–	5	–	0	4	–	7	–	0
McMurry	1	–	6	–	0	2	–	8	–	0
Angelo State *	0	–	0	–	0	6	–	4	–	0
Tarleton State *	0	–	0	–	0	1	–	9	–	0
+ – Conference co-champions; ^ – NAIA playoff participant * – did not complete for conference title; Rankings from NAIA poll and AP small college poll

1969 Mid-Ohio Conference football standings
	Conf.					Overall
Team	W		L		T	W		L		T
No. 16 Defiance $	3	–	0	–	0	9	–	0	–	0
Wilmington (OH)	2	–	1	–	0	3	–	7	–	0
Findlay	1	–	2	–	0	3	–	7	–	0
Bluffton	0	–	3	–	0	0	–	9	–	0
$ – Conference champion; Rankings from NAIA poll

1969 Midwest Conference football standings
	Conf.					Overall
Team	W		L		T	W		L		T
St. Olaf $	8	–	1	–	0	8	–	1	–	0
Monmouth (IL)	7	–	2	–	0	7	–	2	–	0
Coe	6	–	3	–	0	6	–	3	–	0
Grinnell	6	–	3	–	0	6	–	3	–	0
Lawrence	6	–	3	–	0	6	–	3	–	0
Cornell (IA)	4	–	5	–	0	4	–	5	–	0
Ripon	4	–	5	–	0	4	–	5	–	0
Carleton	3	–	6	–	0	3	–	6	–	0
Knox	1	–	8	–	0	1	–	8	–	0
Beloit	0	–	9	–	0	0	–	9	–	0
$ – Conference champion

1969 Minnesota Intercollegiate Athletic Conference football standings
	Conf.					Overall
Team	W		L		T	W		L		T
No. 3 Concordia–Moorhead $^	7	–	0	–	0	10	–	1	–	0
Saint John's (MN)	5	–	1	–	1	8	–	1	–	1
Hamline	5	–	2	–	0	7	–	2	–	0
Gustavus Adolphus	4	–	2	–	1	6	–	3	–	1
Macalester	3	–	4	–	0	5	–	4	–	0
Minnesota–Duluth	2	–	5	–	0	4	–	6	–	0
St. Thomas (MN)	1	–	6	–	0	2	–	8	–	0
Augsburg	0	–	7	–	0	1	–	8	–	0
$ – Conference champion; ^ – NAIA playoff participant; Rankings from NAIA poll

1969 Missouri College Athletic Union football standings
	Conf.					Overall
Team	W		L		T	W		L		T
Culver–Stockton +	3	–	0	–	0	7	–	1	–	1
No. 18 William Jewell +	2	–	0	–	0	9	–	2	–	0
Tarkio	3	–	1	–	0	7	–	2	–	0
Missouri Valley	2	–	2	–	0	5	–	5	–	0
Central Methodist	1	–	3	–	0	3	–	5	–	0
Graceland	0	–	5	–	0	0	–	9	–	0
+ – Conference co-champions; Rankings from NAIA poll

1969 Nebraska College Conference football standings
	Conf.					Overall
Team	W		L		T	W		L		T
Kearney State $	2	–	0	–	1	5	–	3	–	1
Chadron State	2	–	1	–	0	6	–	3	–	0
Wayne State (NE)	1	–	1	–	1	5	–	3	–	1
Peru State	0	–	3	–	0	0	–	9	–	0
$ – Conference champion

1969 Nebraska Intercollegiate Athletic Conference football standings
	Conf.					Overall
Team	W		L		T	W		L		T
No. 11 Doane $	5	–	0	–	0	8	–	0	–	0
Nebraska Wesleyan	4	–	1	–	0	5	–	4	–	0
Concordia (NE)	1	–	2	–	1	4	–	5	–	1
Midland	1	–	3	–	0	1	–	7	–	0
Dana	0	–	3	–	1	2	–	6	–	1
Hastings	0	–	2	–	0	2	–	6	–	0
$ – Conference champion; Rankings from NAIA poll

1969 North Dakota College Athletic Conference football standings
	Conf.					Overall
Team	W		L		T	W		L		T
Jamestown $	4	–	1	–	0	8	–	1	–	0
Dickinson State	3	–	1	–	1	5	–	2	–	1
Mayville State	3	–	1	–	1	5	–	3	–	1
Minot State	3	–	2	–	0	5	–	3	–	0
Wahpeton Science	1	–	4	–	0	2	–	5	–	0
Valley City State	0	–	5	–	0	0	–	7	–	0
$ – Conference champion

1969 Northern Intercollegiate Conference football standings
	Conf.					Overall
Team	W		L		T	W		L		T
Michigan Tech $	4	–	1	–	0	5	–	4	–	0
Minnesota Morris	3	–	1	–	0	7	–	2	–	0
Moorhead State	3	–	2	–	0	4	–	5	–	0
Bemidji State	2	–	2	–	1	4	–	3	–	1
St. Cloud State	1	–	3	–	1	1	–	7	–	1
Winona State	0	–	4	–	0	2	–	7	–	0
$ – Conference champion

1969 Northwest Conference football standings
	Conf.					Overall
Team	W		L		T	W		L		T
Whitman +	4	–	2	–	0	6	–	3	–	0
Pacific Lutheran +	4	–	2	–	0	6	–	3	–	0
Linfield +	4	–	2	–	0	5	–	4	–	0
Lewis & Clark +	4	–	2	–	0	5	–	4	–	0
College of Idaho	3	–	3	–	0	5	–	4	–	0
Pacific (OR)	1	–	5	–	0	3	–	6	–	0
Willamette	1	–	5	–	0	2	–	7	–	0
+ – Conference co-champions

1969 Oklahoma Collegiate Conference football standings
	Conf.					Overall
Team	W		L		T	W		L		T
No. 4 SW Oklahoma State +	6	–	1	–	0	9	–	1	–	0
No. 6 Northeastern State +	6	–	1	–	0	9	–	1	–	0
Central State (OK) *	5	–	1	–	1	8	–	1	–	1
East Central	4	–	2	–	1	6	–	3	–	1
Panhandle	3	–	4	–	0	6	–	5	–	0
NW Oklahoma State	2	–	5	–	0	4	–	6	–	0
SE Oklahoma State	1	–	6	–	0	1	–	9	–	0
Langston	0	–	7	–	0	1	–	9	–	0
$ – Conference champion; * Central State (OK) received a non-conference forfeit win from Eastern New Mexico.; Rankings from NAIA Division I poll

1969 Oregon Collegiate Conference football standings
	Conf.					Overall
Team	W		L		T	W		L		T
Oregon College $	3	–	0	–	0	6	–	3	–	0
Oregon Tech	1	–	2	–	0	4	–	5	–	0
Eastern Oregon	1	–	2	–	0	2	–	7	–	0
Southern Oregon	1	–	2	–	0	2	–	7	–	0
$ – Conference champion

1969 Rocky Mountain Athletic Conference football standings
	Conf.					Overall
Team	W		L		T	W		L		T
Mountain Division
Adams State * xy	6	–	1	–	0	7	–	3	–	0
Western State (CO)	5	–	1	–	0	5	–	4	–	0
Westminster (UT)	3	–	3	–	0	4	–	5	–	0
Southern Utah	2	–	3	–	0	4	–	5	–	0
Colorado Mines	1	–	3	–	0	3	–	6	–	0
Western New Mexico	1	–	4	–	0	1	–	7	–	0
Fort Lewis	1	–	5	–	0	1	–	7	–	0
Plains Division
Colorado State–Greeley xy$	5	–	0	–	0	10	–	0	–	0
Emporia State	4	–	2	–	0	6	–	3	–	0
Southern Colorado	3	–	2	–	0	7	–	2	–	0
Washburn	3	–	3	–	0	5	–	5	–	0
Nebraska–Omaha	2	–	2	–	0	3	–	6	–	0
Pittsburg State	2	–	3	–	0	5	–	5	–	0
Fort Hays State	0	–	6	–	0	0	–	9	–	0
Championship: Colorado State–Greeley 33, Adams State 14
$ – Conference champion; x – Division champion/co-champions; y – Championship game participant; * Adams State received a non-conference forfeit win from Eastern New Mexico.

1969 South Dakota Intercollegiate Conference football standings
	Conf.					Overall
Team	W		L		T	W		L		T
No. 12 Northern State $	6	–	0	–	0	9	–	0	–	0
Black Hills State	5	–	1	–	0	5	–	4	–	0
Dakota Wesleyan	3	–	3	–	0	5	–	4	–	0
Southern State (SD)	3	–	3	–	0	4	–	5	–	0
South Dakota Tech	2	–	4	–	0	3	–	6	–	0
Dakota State	1	–	5	–	0	1	–	7	–	0
Huron	1	–	5	–	0	?	–	?	–	?
$ – Conference champion; Rankings from NAIA poll

1969 Southern Intercollegiate Athletic Conference football standings
	Conf.					Overall
Team	W		L		T	W		L		T
Division I
No. 16 Florida A&M x	4	–	0	–	0	8	–	1	–	0
Alabama A&M	2	–	2	–	0	6	–	3	–	0
Bethune–Cookman	1	–	2	–	1	4	–	3	–	1
South Carolina State	1	–	2	–	1	5	–	3	–	1
Morris Brown	3	–	2	–	0	4	–	5	–	0
Division II
Tuskegee x	5	–	1	–	0	7	–	3	–	0
Fort Valley State	6	–	1	–	0	7	–	2	–	0
Clark (GA)	4	–	3	–	1	4	–	4	–	1
Alabama State	4	–	3	–	0	7	–	3	–	0
Savannah State	2	–	3	–	0	3	–	5	–	0
Lane	2	–	3	–	1	2	–	6	–	1
Morehouse	2	–	4	–	0	4	–	5	–	0
Fisk	2	–	5	–	0	3	–	6	–	0
Knoxville	1	–	6	–	0	1	–	6	–	0
x – Division champion/co-champions; Rankings from AP small college poll

1969 Southwestern Athletic Conference football standings
	Conf.					Overall
Team	W		L		T	W		L		T
No. 9/8 Alcorn A&M $	6	–	0	–	1	8	–	0	–	1
Southern	5	–	1	–	1	6	–	2	–	1
Grambling	5	–	2	–	0	6	–	4	–	0
Texas Southern	3	–	3	–	1	4	–	3	–	2
Prairie View A&M	3	–	4	–	0	4	–	5	–	0
Arkansas AM&N	2	–	4	–	1	3	–	6	–	1
Jackson State	1	–	6	–	0	2	–	6	–	0
Mississippi Valley State	1	–	6	–	0	1	–	8	–	0
$ – Conference champion; Rankings from NAIA poll and AP small college poll

1969 Southern California Intercollegiate Athletic Conference football standings
	Conf.					Overall
Team	W		L		T	W		L		T
Whittier $	4	–	0	–	0	5	–	5	–	0
No. 19 Redlands	3	–	1	–	0	7	–	2	–	0
Claremont-Mudd	3	–	2	–	0	5	–	4	–	0
Pomona	2	–	3	–	0	3	–	6	–	0
Occidental	1	–	4	–	0	1	–	8	–	0
Caltech	0	–	3	–	0	0	–	8	–	0
$ – Conference champion; Rankings from NAIA poll

1969 Tri-State Conference football standings
	Conf.					Overall
Team	W		L		T	W		L		T
Yankton $	5	–	1	–	0	8	–	1	–	0
Concordia (NE)	4	–	1	–	1	4	–	5	–	1
Northwestern (IA)	4	–	2	–	0	7	–	2	–	0
Westmar	3	–	3	–	0	5	–	4	–	0
Dana	2	–	3	–	1	2	–	6	–	1
Midland	1	–	5	–	0	1	–	7	–	0
Sioux Falls	1	–	5	–	0	1	–	8	–	0
$ – Conference champion

1969 West Virginia Intercollegiate Athletic Conference football standings
	Conf.					Overall
Team	W		L		T	W		L		T
No. 10 Fairmont State $	6	–	0	–	0	8	–	1	–	0
Salem	8	–	1	–	0	8	–	1	–	0
West Liberty State	6	–	2	–	0	6	–	3	–	0
West Virginia State	4	–	3	–	0	6	–	4	–	0
Glenville State	4	–	4	–	0	5	–	4	–	0
Bluefield State	3	–	3	–	0	4	–	4	–	0
Shepherd	1	–	3	–	0	6	–	4	–	0
West Virginia Wesleyan	1	–	5	–	0	1	–	7	–	0
West Virginia Tech	1	–	6	–	0	1	–	8	–	0
Concord	0	–	7	–	0	0	–	10	–	0
$ – Conference champion; Conference standings based on power ratings; Rankings from NAIA poll

1969 Wisconsin State University Conference football standings
	Conf.					Overall
Team	W		L		T	W		L		T
Platteville State +	7	–	1	–	0	8	–	1	–	0
No. 20 Whitewater State +	7	–	1	–	0	8	–	1	–	0
Oshkosh State	5	–	3	–	0	6	–	4	–	0
Eau Claire State	5	–	3	–	0	5	–	4	–	0
La Crosse State	4	–	4	–	0	5	–	5	–	0
Stout State	3	–	5	–	0	3	–	6	–	0
Stevens Point State	2	–	6	–	0	2	–	8	–	0
Superior State	2	–	6	–	0	2	–	8	–	0
River Falls State	1	–	7	–	0	2	–	8	–	0
+ – Conference co-champions; Rankings from NAIA poll

1969 NAIA independents football records
	Conf.			Overall
Team	W	L	T	W		L		T
No. 14/NR Boise State		–		9	–	1	–	0
No. 8/NR Western Carolina		–		9	–	1	–	0
Cal Lutheran		–		8	–	1	–	0
No. 2/6 New Mexico Highlands ^		–		8	–	1	–	1
No. 5/NR Hillsdale ^		–		9	–	2	–	0
Wofford		–		9	–	2	–	0
No. 15/9 Tampa		–		8	–	2	–	0
Austin		–		7	–	2	–	0
Westminster (PA)		–		6	–	2	–	0
Georgetown (KY)		–		6	–	3	–	0
Carson–Newman		–		6	–	3	–	1
Iowa Wesleyan		–		5	–	3	–	0
La Verne		–		5	–	4	–	0
Waynesburg		–		5	–	4	–	0
Appalachian State		–		6	–	5	–	0
Oklahoma Panhandle State		–		6	–	5	–	0
Grove City		–		3	–	4	–	1
Southwest State (MN)		–		3	–	6	–	0
Wheaton (IL)		–		3	–	6	–	0
Emory and Henry		–		2	–	7	–	0
Missouri Southern		–		2	–	8	–	0
Geneva		–		1	–	6	–	1
Simon Fraser		–		1	–	6	–	1
Azusa Pacific		–		1	–	7	–	0
Eastern New Mexico *		–		1	–	9	–	0
Kentucky State		–		0	–	8	–	0
^ – NAIA playoff participant; * Eastern New Mexico forfeits win over Adams State and Central State (OK).; Rankings from NAIA poll and AP small college poll

== Postseason ==
Semifinals; November 29, 1969
Hillsdale	0
Concordia–Moorhead*	27
New Mexico Highlands	23
Texas A&I*	28

NAIA Championship Bowl; December 13, 1969; Kingsville, TX
Concordia–Moorhead	7
Texas A&I*	32

== See also ==
- 1969 NCAA University Division football season
- 1969 NCAA College Division football season
