= 1969 college football season =

1969 college football season may refer to:

- 1969 NCAA University Division football season
- 1969 NCAA College Division football season
- 1969 NAIA football season
