= Sviták =

Sviták (feminine: Svitáková) is a Czech surname. Notable people with the surname include:

- Adora Svitak (born 1997), American writer
- Ivan Sviták (1925–1994), Czech philosopher, critic, and poet
- Jakub Sviták (born 1991), Czech handball player
- Jan Sviták (1898–1945), Czech actor and film director
- Martin Sviták (born 1980), Czech footballer
- Steve Svitak (born 1945), Canadian football player
