= Bob Blasi =

American football player and coach (1930–2023)

Biographical details
- Born: September 24, 1930; Cunningham, Kansas, U.S.
- Died: September 27, 2023 (aged 93); Littleton, Colorado, U.S.

Playing career
- 1951–1952: Colorado A&M
- Positions: Guard, linebacker

Coaching career (HC unless noted)
- 1953: Colorado A&M (assistant freshmen)
- 1954: Helena HS (MT) (assistant)
- 1956–1965: Colorado State–Greeley (line)
- 1966–1984: Colorado State–Greeley / Northern Colorado

Head coaching record
- Overall: 107–71–3
- Tournaments: 0–1 (NCAA D-II playoffs)

Accomplishments and honors

Championships
- 2 RMAC (1969, 1971); 3 GPAC (1973–1975); 1 NCC (1980); 3 RMAC Plains Division (1969–1971)

Robert L. Blasi (September 24, 1930 – September 27, 2023) was an American football coach. He was the head coach at University of Northern Colorado in Greeley, Colorado from 1966 to 1984, compiling a record of 107–71–3. He produced many good teams in his 18 years as head coach, but the best was the 1969 squad, which finished 10–0, won the Rocky Mountain Athletic Conference title and was ranked No. 3 in the final United Press International poll. Blasi was inducted into the Colorado Sports Hall of Fame in 2010. He died in Littleton, Colorado on September 27, 2023, three days after his 93rd birthday.

== Head coaching record ==
Year	Team	Overall	Conference	Standing	Bowl/playoffs
Colorado State–Greeley / Northern Colorado Bears (Rocky Mountain Conference / Rocky Mountain Athletic Conference) (1966–1971)
1966	Colorado State–Greeley	3–7	0–3	4th	
1967	Colorado State–Greeley	6–2–1	2–1	3rd	
1968	Colorado State–Greeley	5–3	1–1	2nd	
1969	Colorado State–Greeley	10–0	5–0	1st (Plains)	
1970	Northern Colorado	7–2	4–1	T–1st (Plains)	
1971	Northern Colorado	8–1–1	5–0	1st (Plains)	
Northern Colorado Bears (Great Plains Athletic Conference) (1972–1975)
1972	Northern Colorado	6–3	4–2	T–2nd	
1973	Northern Colorado	7–2	4–1	T–1st	
1974	Northern Colorado	8–1	5–0	1st	
1975	Northern Colorado	8–1	5–0	1st	
Northern Colorado Bears (NCAA Division II independent) (1976–1978)
1976	Northern Colorado	6–3			
1977	Northern Colorado	3–7			
1978	Northern Colorado	4–6			
Northern Colorado Bears (North Central Conference) (1979–1984)
1979	Northern Colorado	2–8	NA	NA	
1980	Northern Colorado	7–4	6–1	1st	L NCAA Division II Quarterfinal
1981	Northern Colorado	5–4	4–3	T–2nd	
1982	Northern Colorado	5–3–1	4–3	4th	
1983	Northern Colorado	4–6	4–5	T–4th	
1984	Northern Colorado	3–8	3–6	T–6th	
Colorado State–Greeley / Northern Colorado:		107–71–3	56–27		
Total:		107–71–3			
National championship Conference title Conference division title or championship game berth
