= William Glosson =

Biographical details
- Born: January 18, 1937
- Died: October 9, 1996 (aged 59); Houston, Texas, U.S.

Playing career
- 1956–1958: Texas Southern
- 1959: Montreal Alouettes
- Position: End

Coaching career (HC unless noted)
- 1961–1967: Texas Southern (assistant)
- 1968–1969: Mississippi Valley State

Administrative career (AD unless noted)
- 1970–1980: Texas Southern (assistant AD)
- 1980–1982: Texas Southern

Head coaching record
- Overall: 2–15

William Henry "Rock" Glosson (January 18, 1937 – October 9, 1996) was an American gridiron football player, coach of football and golf, and college athletics administrator. He was the seventh head football coach at Mississippi Valley State College—now known as Mississippi Valley State University—in Itta Bena, Mississippi, serving for two seasons, from 1968 to 1969, and compiling a record of 2–15. He was the athletic director at his alma mater, Texas Southern University, from 1980 to 1982.

A native of Philadelphia, Glosson played college football at Texas Southern, where he was a three-time all-Southwestern Athletic Conference (SWAC) end, from 1956 to 1959. He played Canadian football professionally for one season, in 1959, with the Montreal Alouettes of the Canadian Football League (CFL). He was an assistant football coach at Texas Southern from 1961 to 1967. After his head coaching stint at Mississippi Valley State, Glosson returned to Texas Southern again in 1970 as assistant athletic director, assistant football coach, and head golf coach.

Glosson was married to Rose Walker.

== Head coaching record ==
Year	Team	Overall	Conference	Standing	Bowl/playoffs
Mississippi Valley State Delta Devils (NCAA College Division independent) (1968)
1968	Mississippi Valley State	1–7			
Mississippi Valley State Delta Devils (Southwestern Athletic Conference) (1969)
1969	Mississippi Valley State	1–8	1–6	T–7th	
Mississippi Valley State:		2–15	1–6		
Total:		2–15			
