= 1969 Mississippi Valley State Delta Devils football team =

American college football season

1969 Mississippi Valley State Delta Devils football
- Conference: Southwestern Athletic Conference
- Record: 1–8 (1–6 SWAC)
- Head coach: William Glosson (2nd season)
- Home stadium: Magnolia Stadium

1969 Southwestern Athletic Conference football standings
	Conf.					Overall
Team	W		L		T	W		L		T
No. 9/8 Alcorn A&M $	6	–	0	–	1	8	–	0	–	1
Southern	5	–	1	–	1	6	–	2	–	1
Grambling	5	–	2	–	0	6	–	4	–	0
Texas Southern	3	–	3	–	1	4	–	3	–	2
Prairie View A&M	3	–	4	–	0	4	–	5	–	0
Arkansas AM&N	2	–	4	–	1	3	–	6	–	1
Jackson State	1	–	6	–	0	2	–	6	–	0
Mississippi Valley State	1	–	6	–	0	1	–	8	–	0
$ – Conference champion; Rankings from NAIA poll and AP small college poll

The 1969 Mississippi Valley State Delta Devils football team represented Mississippi Valley State College (now known as Mississippi Valley State University) as a member of the Southwestern Athletic Conference (SWAC) during the 1969 NCAA College Division football season. Led by second-year head coach William Glosson, the Delta Devils compiled an overall record of 1–8, with a conference record of 1–6, and finished tied for seventh in the SWAC.

== Schedule ==
Date	Opponent	Site	Result	Attendance	Source
September 27	Arkansas AM&N	Magnolia Stadium; Itta Bena, MS	W 13–7		
October 4	at Southern	University Stadium; Baton Rouge, LA	L 7–30		
October 11	at Miles*	Rickwood Field; Birmingham, AL	L 7–10		
October 18	at Grambling	Grambling Stadium; Grambling, LA	L 14–41	14,167	
October 25	Texas Southern	Magnolia Stadium; Itta Bena, MS	L 7–55		
November 1	Prairie View A&M	Magnolia Stadium; Itta Bena, MS	L 10–12		
November 8	vs. Alcorn A&M	City Park Stadium; Vicksburg, MS	L 10–41		
November 15	at Bethune–Cookman*	Municipal Stadium; Daytona Beach, FL	L 14–34		
November 22	Jackson State	Magnolia Stadium; Itta Bena, MS	L 2–51		
*Non-conference game
