= Ed Baker (quarterback) =

American football player (born 1948)

No. 12, 18
- Position: Quarterback

Personal information
- Born: May 29, 1948 (age 78); East Orange, New Jersey, U.S.
- Listed height: 6 ft 2 in (1.88 m)
- Listed weight: 200 lb (91 kg)

Career information
- High school: West Essex (NJ)
- College: Lafayette
- NFL draft: 1970: undrafted

Career history
- New York Giants (1970–1971); Houston Oilers (1972); Oakland Raiders (1973)*; New York Jets (1973)*
- * Offseason or practice squad member only

Career NFL statistics
- Passing attempts: 10
- Passing completions: 4
- Completion percentage: 40.0%
- TD–INT: 0–4
- Passing yards: 47
- QB rating: 15.4
- Stats at Pro Football Reference

Edward Everett Baker (born May 29, 1948) is an American former professional football player who was a quarterback in the National Football League (NFL). He attended West Essex High School and played college football for the Lafayette Leopards.

Baker played in one career game for the Houston Oilers in 1972 against the Cincinnati Bengals, which was a disappointment when he threw four interceptions and got sacked twice. He was also a member of the New York Giants and New York Jets, and spent the 1973 offseason with the Oakland Raiders.
