= Seth Miller (gridiron football) =

American gridiron football player (born 1948)

Profile
- Positions: Cornerback, safety, running back, tight end, wingback

Personal information
- Born: March 20, 1948 (age 78); Carthage, Arkansas, U.S.
- Listed height: 6 ft 4 in (1.93 m)
- Listed weight: 207 lb (94 kg)

Career information
- High school: Auburn (IL)
- College: Arizona State
- NFL draft: 1970: 8th round, 195th overall pick

Career history
- Atlanta Falcons (1970)*; Minnesota Vikings (1970)*; Hamilton Tiger Cats (1971); Memphis Southmen (1974–1975)
- * Offseason or practice squad member only

Seth Bane Miller (born March 20, 1948) is an American former football player. He played college football for Arizona State from 1966 to 1969 three years of professional football as a corneback and safety in the Canadian Football League (CFL) for the Hamilton Tiger Cats in 1971 and in the World Football League (WFL) for the Memphis Southmen in 1974 and 1975.

== Early life ==
Miller was born in Carthage, Arkansas in 1948 and attended Auburn High School in Rockford, Illinois. He played running back and defensive end for the Auburn football team. He was chosen as an all-state halfback in 1965.

== Arizona State ==
He played college football at Arizona State from 1966 to 1969. During his first two years at Arizona State, he played at running back, tight end, and wingback. He later switched to the safety position and led college football in 1969 with 11 interceptions. Miller also played basketball and ran track at Arizona State. He ran the 100-yard dash in 9.7 seconds and wa clocked at 4.6 in the 40.

== Professional football ==
Miller was drafted by the Atlanta Falcons in the eighth round of the 1970 NFL draft, but he was cut prior to the regular season. He was signed by the Minnesota Vikings and cut a week later. He spent the 1970 season playing at wide receiver for the Rockford Rams in the Continental league.

In 1971, he joined the Hamilton Tiger-Cats as a cornerback in the Canadian Football League. He appeared in three CFL games during the 1971 season. His playing career in the CFL was terminated following his arrest in August 1971 for possession of a hookah pipe that could be use for smoking marijana. He pleaded guilty and was fined $100. A year later, Miller was out of football and told a reporter: "The ironic thing is I've never smoked marijana. Never. And yet I'm tabbed. When I approach people, I can feel its in the back of their mind, wondering if I was involved, if I still am involved, with drugs. That was the only time I've been arrested, but there's a stigma."

In 1974, he joined the World Football League, playing for the Memphis Southmen during the 1974 and 1975 seasons. He had 14 interceptions while playing in the WFL.
