= Jim Thrower =

American football player (born 1947)

No. 49, 21
- Position: Defensive back

Personal information
- Born: November 6, 1947 (age 79); Camden, Arkansas, U.S.
- Listed height: 6 ft 2 in (1.88 m)
- Listed weight: 195 lb (88 kg)

Career information
- College: East Texas State
- NFL draft: 1970: undrafted

Career history
- Philadelphia Eagles (1970–1972); Detroit Lions (1973–1974)

Career NFL statistics
- Games: 46
- Kick rtn yards: 353
- Stats at Pro Football Reference

James Frederick Thrower (born November 6, 1947) is an American former professional football player who was a defensive back in the National Football League (NFL). He played college football for the East Texas State Lions (now East Texas A&M). In 2022 he was inducted into the Arkansas Black Hall of Fame.

Thrower was born in Camden, Arkansas, in 1947. He attended Lincoln High School and played college football at East Texas State University. He also excelled at track and field and basketball, and was inducted into the university's athletic hall of fame.

Thrower played professional football as a defensive back in the NFL for the Philadelphia Eagles from 1970 to 1972. He was fired by the Eagles in November 1972.

He next played for the Detroit Lions during the 1973 and 1974 seasons. While with the Lions, he was a backup to cornerback Lem Barney and also served as captain of the special team unit. He was also a member of the Fellowship of Christian Athletes. During the 1975, was placed on the injured reserve list. The Detroit Free Press called him the captain of the injured reserve list.

In three years in the NFL, Thrower appeared in a total of 46 NFL games, four of them as a starter.

After retiring from football, Thrower worked for the Stroh Brewery Co. and later Michigan Consolidated Gas Co. He was also a leading fundraiser for the NAACP.
