= 1969 Northern State Wolves football team =

American college football season

1969 Northern State Wolves football

SDIC champion
- Conference: South Dakota Intercollegiate Conference
- Record: 9–0 (6–0 SDIC)
- Head coach: Jim Kretchman (1st season)

1969 South Dakota Intercollegiate Conference football standings
	Conf.					Overall
Team	W		L		T	W		L		T
No. 12 Northern State $	6	–	0	–	0	9	–	0	–	0
Black Hills State	5	–	1	–	0	5	–	4	–	0
Dakota Wesleyan	3	–	3	–	0	5	–	4	–	0
Southern State (SD)	3	–	3	–	0	4	–	5	–	0
South Dakota Tech	2	–	4	–	0	3	–	6	–	0
Dakota State	1	–	5	–	0	2	–	7	–	0
Huron	1	–	5	–	0	2	–	7	–	0
$ – Conference champion; Rankings from NAIA poll

The 1969 Northern State Wolves football team was an American football team that represented Northern State University as a member of the South Dakota Intercollegiate Conference (SDIC) during the 1969 NAIA football season. In their first year under head coach Jim Kretchman, the Wolves compiled a perfect 9–0 record (6–0 in conference games), won the SDIC championship, and outscored opponents by a total of 364 to 85.

Kretchman was selected as the NAIA District 12 football coach of the year for 1969. Seven Northern State players were honored as first-team players on the 1969 All-SDIC football team:

- Lee Wilson, running back, 6'3", 205 pounds, junior, Westport
- Greg Brewer receiver, 5'8", 155 pounds, senior, Faulkton
- Greg Youngan, offensive lineman, 5'10", 203 pounds, junior, Alexandria
- Monte Hillestad, offensive lineman, 6'0", 204 pounds, senior, watertown
- Gordon Groos, defensive lineman, 6'3", 215 pounds, senior, Sisseton
- Wayne Schlekeway, defensive back, 6'0", 170 pounds, senior, Lake City
- Dick Maynes, defensive back, 6'0", 170 pounds, senior, Milbank

The team played its home games in Aberdeen, South Dakota.

== Schedule ==
Date	Opponent	Site	Result	Attendance	Source
September 13	Valley City State*	Aberdeen, SD	W 51–7		
September 20	Eastern Montana*	Aberdeen, SD	W 14–3		
October 4	at Black Hills State	Spearfish, SD	W 64–19		
October 11	at Dakota State	Madison, SD	W 37–7		
October 18	at Southern State (SD)	Springfield, SD	W 35–6		
October 25	South Dakota Tech^{†}	Aberdeen, SD (Gypsy Day)	W 54–21		
November 1	Dakota Wesleyan	Aberdeen, SD	W 34–0		
November 8	Huron	Aberdeen, SD	W 42–8		
November 15	Kearney State*	Aberdeen, SD	W 33–14	5,500	
*Non-conference game; ^{†}Homecoming
