= Tim Roth (Canadian football) =

American gridiron football player (born 1948)

Profile
- Position: Defensive tackle

Personal information
- Born: August 14, 1948 (age 78); Madison, Minnesota, U.S.
- Listed height: 6 ft 2 in (1.88 m)
- Listed weight: 250 lb (113 kg)

Career information
- College: South Dakota State

Career history
- 1971–1977: Saskatchewan Roughriders

Awards and highlights
- CFL West All-Star (1975, 1976)

Tim Roth (born August 14, 1948) is a Canadian football player who played professionally for the Saskatchewan Roughriders.
