= 1969 Colorado State–Greeley Bears football team =

American college football season

1969 Colorado State–Greeley Bears football

RMAC champion RMAC Plains Division champion

MAC championship game, W 33–14 vs. Adams State
- Conference: Rocky Mountain Athletic Conference
- Plains Division
- Record: 10–0 (5–0 RMAC)
- Head coach: Bob Blasi (4th season)
- Captains: Mickey Holmes; Randy Thompson; Joe Drew
- Home stadium: Jackson Field

1969 Rocky Mountain Athletic Conference football standings
	Conf.					Overall
Team	W		L		T	W		L		T
Mountain Division
Adams State * xy	6	–	1	–	0	7	–	3	–	0
Western State (CO)	5	–	1	–	0	5	–	4	–	0
Westminster (UT)	3	–	3	–	0	4	–	5	–	0
Southern Utah	2	–	3	–	0	4	–	5	–	0
Colorado Mines	1	–	3	–	0	3	–	6	–	0
Western New Mexico	1	–	4	–	0	1	–	7	–	0
Fort Lewis	1	–	5	–	0	1	–	7	–	0
Plains Division
Colorado State–Greeley xy$	5	–	0	–	0	10	–	0	–	0
Emporia State	4	–	2	–	0	6	–	3	–	0
Southern Colorado	3	–	2	–	0	7	–	2	–	0
Washburn	3	–	3	–	0	5	–	5	–	0
Nebraska–Omaha	2	–	2	–	0	3	–	6	–	0
Pittsburg State	2	–	3	–	0	5	–	5	–	0
Fort Hays State	0	–	6	–	0	0	–	9	–	0
Championship: Colorado State–Greeley 33, Adams State 14
$ – Conference champion; x – Division champion/co-champions; y – Championship game participant; * Adams State received a non-conference forfeit win from Eastern New Mexico.

The 1969 Colorado State–Greeley Bears football team was an American football team that represented Colorado State College (now known as the University of Northern Colorado) as a member of the Rocky Mountain Athletic Conference (RMAC) during the 1969 NCAA College Division football season. In their fourth year under head coach Bob Blasi, the Bears compiled an overall record of 10–0 record (5–0 in conference play), won the RMAC championship, and outscored opponents by a total of 435 to 132. It was the first perfect season in program history and the first RMAC championship in 21 years.

The team broke multiple team records, including points scored (435), total yards gained (3,898), most touchdowns scored (63), most passing yards (1,875), most rushing yards (2,023), fewest yards allowed (1,729), most passes intercepted (27), and fewest rushing yards allowed per game (57.4).

Quarterback George Kaplan broke the school's single-season records with 19 touchdown passes, 1,525 passing yards, 1,420 yards of total offense, 102 passes completed, and a 57.0% pass completion percentage. Back Mickey Holmes also broke multiple single-season records, including 38 pass receptions, 517 receiving yards, and 80 points scored. Tailback Ben Pyatt led the team with 583 rushing yards on 127 carries. Defensive tackle Joe Drew tallied six fumble recoveries and received All-America honors. Four Greeley players were named to the All-RMAC team: end Dennis Becking; defensive end Grail Kister; linebacker Randy Thompson; and defensive back Rick Pierson.

Mickey Holmes, Randy Thompson, and Joe Drew were the team captains. Jerry McMillen, Buck Rollins, Vince Zimmer, and Bob Aylward were the team's assistant coaches.

The team played its home games at Jackson Field in Greeley, Colorado.

== Schedule ==
Date	Opponent	Site	Result	Attendance	Source
September 20	at Emporia State	Emporia, KS	W 33–3	9,000	
September 27	Fort Hays State	Jackson Field; Greeley, CO	W 53–6	6,900	
October 4	at Colorado Mines*	Golden, CO	W 58–0	933	
October 11	at Boise State*	Bronco Stadium; Boise, ID	W 16–10	8,700	
October 18	Eastern New Mexico*	Jackson Field; Greeley, CO	W 28–14	4,000	
October 25	Fort Lewis*^{†}	Jackson Field; Greeley, CO	W 68–0	7,500–8,000	
November 1	at Southern Colorado	Pueblo, CO	W 41–20	4,000	
November 8	at Eastern Montana*	Billings, MT	W 35–0	985	
November 15	Washburn	Jackson Field; Greeley, CO	W 70–28	6,500	
November 22	Adams State	Jackson Field; Greeley, CO (RMAC championship game)	W 33–14	5,700–6,000	
*Non-conference game; ^{†}Homecoming
