= 1969 Jackson State Tigers football team =

American college football season

1969 Jackson State Tigers football
- Conference: Southwestern Athletic Conference
- Record: 2–6 (1–6 SWAC)
- Head coach: Ulysses S. McPherson (1st season)
- Home stadium: Alumni Field; Mississippi Veterans Memorial Stadium

1969 Southwestern Athletic Conference football standings
	Conf.					Overall
Team	W		L		T	W		L		T
No. 9/8 Alcorn A&M $	6	–	0	–	1	8	–	0	–	1
Southern	5	–	1	–	1	6	–	2	–	1
Grambling	5	–	2	–	0	6	–	4	–	0
Texas Southern	3	–	3	–	1	4	–	3	–	2
Prairie View A&M	3	–	4	–	0	4	–	5	–	0
Arkansas AM&N	2	–	4	–	1	3	–	6	–	1
Jackson State	1	–	6	–	0	2	–	6	–	0
Mississippi Valley State	1	–	6	–	0	1	–	8	–	0
$ – Conference champion; Rankings from NAIA poll and AP small college poll

The 1969 Jackson State Tigers football team represented Jackson State College (now known as Jackson State University) as a member of the Southwestern Athletic Conference (SWAC) during the 1969 NCAA College Division football season. Led by first-year head coach Ulysses S. McPherson, the Tigers compiled an overall record of 2–6, with a conference record of 1–6, and finished tied for seventh in the SWAC.

== Schedule ==
Date	Opponent	Site	Result	Attendance	Source
September 20	at Prairie View A&M	Blackshear Field; Prairie View, TX	L 13–21		
October 4	at Arkansas AM&N	Pumphrey Stadium; Pine Bluff, AR	L 25–34		
October 11	Bishop*^{†}	Alumni Field; Jackson, MS	W 27–16	13,000	
October 18	Southern	Mississippi Veterans Memorial Stadium; Jackson, MS (rivalry)	L 20–47		
October 25	Grambling	Mississippi Veterans Memorial Stadium; Jackson, MS	L 13–62	13,992	
November 8	at Texas Southern	Jeppesen Stadium; Houston, TX	L 8–35		
November 22	at Mississippi Valley State	Magnolia Stadium; Itta Bena, MS	W 51–2		
November 27	No. 5 Alcorn A&M	Mississippi Veterans Memorial Stadium; Jackson, MS (rivalry)	L 8–50	20,000	
*Non-conference game; ^{†}Homecoming; Rankings from AP Poll released prior to the game
