= 1969 Arkansas AM&N Golden Lions football team =

American college football season

1969 Arkansas AM&N Golden Lions football
- Conference: Southwestern Athletic Conference
- Record: 3–6–1 (2–4–1 SWAC)
- Head coach: Vannette W. Johnson (8th season)
- Home stadium: Pumphrey Stadium

1969 Southwestern Athletic Conference football standings
	Conf.					Overall
Team	W		L		T	W		L		T
No. 9/8 Alcorn A&M $	6	–	0	–	1	8	–	0	–	1
Southern	5	–	1	–	1	6	–	2	–	1
Grambling	5	–	2	–	0	6	–	4	–	0
Texas Southern	3	–	3	–	1	4	–	3	–	2
Prairie View A&M	3	–	4	–	0	4	–	5	–	0
Arkansas AM&N	2	–	4	–	1	3	–	6	–	1
Jackson State	1	–	6	–	0	2	–	6	–	0
Mississippi Valley State	1	–	6	–	0	1	–	8	–	0
$ – Conference champion; Rankings from NAIA poll and AP small college poll

The 1969 Arkansas AM&N Golden Lions football team represented the Arkansas Agricultural, Mechanical and Normal College (now known as the University of Arkansas at Pine Bluff) as a member of the Southwestern Athletic Conference (SWAC) during the 1969 NCAA College Division football season. Led by eighth-year head coach Vannette W. Johnson, the Golden Lions compiled an overall record of 3–6–1, with a conference record of 2–4–1, and finished sixth in the SWAC.

== Schedule ==
Date	Opponent	Site	Result	Source
September 20	Lincoln (MO)*	Pumphrey Stadium; Pine Bluff, AR	W 31–14	
September 27	at Mississippi Valley State	Magnolia Stadium; Itta Bena, MS	L 7–13	
October 4	Jackson State	Pumphrey Stadium; Pine Bluff, AR	W 34–25	
October 11	at Southern	University Stadium; Baton Rouge, LA	L 19–40	
October 18	at Texas Southern	Jeppesen Stadium; Houston, TX	W 21–20	
October 25	Prairie View A&M	Pumphrey Stadium; Pine Bluff, AR	L 14–22	
November 1	at No. 2 Alcorn A&M	Henderson Stadium; Lorman, MS	T 23–23	
November 8	Grambling	Pumphrey Stadium; Pine Bluff, AR	L 0–42	
November 22	vs. Arkansas Tech*	War Memorial Stadium; Little Rock, AR	L 7–21	
November 29	at Bishop*	Dallas, TX	L 17–24	
*Non-conference game; Rankings from AP Poll released prior to the game
