= 1969 Prairie View A&M Panthers football team =

American college football season

1969 Prairie View A&M Panthers football
- Conference: Southwestern Athletic Conference
- Record: 4–5 (3–4 SWAC)
- Head coach: Alexander Durley (1st season)
- Home stadium: Edward L. Blackshear Field; Astrodome

1969 Southwestern Athletic Conference football standings
	Conf.					Overall
Team	W		L		T	W		L		T
No. 9/8 Alcorn A&M $	6	–	0	–	1	8	–	0	–	1
Southern	5	–	1	–	1	6	–	2	–	1
Grambling	5	–	2	–	0	6	–	4	–	0
Texas Southern	3	–	3	–	1	4	–	3	–	2
Prairie View A&M	3	–	4	–	0	4	–	5	–	0
Arkansas AM&N	2	–	4	–	1	3	–	6	–	1
Jackson State	1	–	6	–	0	2	–	6	–	0
Mississippi Valley State	1	–	6	–	0	1	–	8	–	0
$ – Conference champion; Rankings from NAIA poll and AP small college poll

The 1969 Prairie View A&M Panthers football team represented Prairie View A&M College of Texas (now known as Prairie View A&M University) as a member of the Southwestern Athletic Conference (SWAC) during the 1969 NCAA College Division football season. Led by first-year head coach Alexander Durley, the Panthers compiled an overall record of 4–5, with a conference record of 3–4, and finished fifth in the SWAC.

== Schedule ==
Date	Opponent	Site	Result	Attendance	Source
September 20	Jackson State	Edward L. Blackshear Field; Prairie View, TX	W 21–13		
September 28	Southern	Astrodome; Houston, TX	L 6–14	22,175	
October 4	at Grambling	Grambling Stadium; Grambling, LA (rivalry)	L 25–58	11,072	
October 18	at Bishop*	Cotton Bowl; Dallas, TX	L 21–36	22,000	
October 25	at Arkansas AM&N	Pumphrey Stadium; Pine Bluff, AR	W 22–14		
November 1	at Mississippi Valley State	Magnolia Stadium; Itta Bena, MS	W 12–10		
November 8	Maryland State*	Edward L. Blackshear Field; Prairie View, TX	W 33–0		
November 15	at No. 6 Alcorn A&M	Henderson Stadium; Lorman, MS	L 12–10		
November 27	vs. Texas Southern	Astrodome; Houston, TX (rivalry)	L 0–10		
*Non-conference game; Rankings from AP Poll released prior to the game
