= Harris Jones =

American football player (born 1945)

No. 58, 61
- Position: Offensive guard

Personal information
- Born: October 3, 1945 (age 81); Lake City, South Carolina, U.S.
- Listed height: 6 ft 6 in (1.98 m)
- Listed weight: 255 lb (116 kg)

Career information
- High school: Carver (Lake City)
- College: Johnson C. Smith

Career history
- San Diego Chargers (1970–1972); Houston Oilers (1973–1974)
- Stats at Pro Football Reference

Harris J. Jones Jr. (born October 3, 1945) is an American former professional football offensive guard who played three seasons in the National Football League (NFL) with the San Diego Chargers and Houston Oilers. He played college football at Johnson C. Smith.

== Early life and college ==
Harris J. Jones Jr. was born on October 3, 1945, in Lake City, South Carolina. He played football and basketball at Carver High School in Lake City. He graduated in 1963. He was later inducted into the Florence County School District Three Athletic Hall of Fame.

== College career ==
Jones played college football for the Johnson C. Smith Golden Bulls of Johnson C. Smith University. He then served in the United States Army and was stationed in Germany. He played both football and basketball while in the Army. He was the All-USAER football MVP in 1969. Jones was inducted into Johnson C. Smith's athletic hall of fame in 2001.

== Professional career ==
After being honorably discharged from the Army, Jones signed with the San Diego Chargers in 1970. He did not appear in any games during the 1970 season. He played in 11 games for the Chargers in 1971. Jones was placed on injured reserve in 1972 and did not appear in any games that season. He was waived by the Chargers in 1973.

Jones was claimed off waivers by the Houston Oilers in 1973. He played in five games, starting four, for the Oilers during the 1973 season. He appeared in 11 games, starting eight, in 1974, recording one kick return for no yards and one fumble recovery. He was released in 1975.
