= Martin Sviták =

Czech footballer

Personal information
- Date of birth: 14 February 1980 (age 46)
- Place of birth: Valašské Meziříčí, Czechoslovakia
- Height: 1.80 m (5 ft 11 in)
- Position: Midfielder

Youth career
- FC Baník Ostrava

Senior career*
Years	Team	Apps	(Gls)
2001–2003	FC Baník Ostrava	18	(1)
2003–2005	SFC Opava	50	(4)
2005–2006	FK Mladá Boleslav	17	(1)
2006–2007	→ Marila Příbram (loan)	22	(1)
2007–2009	→ Vysočina Jihlava (loan)	7	(0)
2009–2010	Torgelower SV Greif		
2010–2011	FCO Neugersdorf		
- * Club domestic league appearances and goals as of 18 May 2010

Martin Sviták (born 14 February 1980) is a Czech football player.

Sviták started his football career at Baník Ostrava, but did not manage to become a first squad regular and moved to SFC Opava. He eventually played for several other Czech clubs before moving to German lower division side Torgelower SV Greif.
