= 1969 Whitewater State Warhawks football team =

American college football season

1969 Whitewater State Warhawks football

WSUC co-champion
- Conference: Wisconsin State University Conference
- Record: 8–1 (7–1 WSUC)
- Head coach: Forrest Perkins (14th season)
- Home stadium: Hamilton Field

1969 Wisconsin State University Conference football standings
	Conf.					Overall
Team	W		L		T	W		L		T
Platteville State +	7	–	1	–	0	8	–	1	–	0
No. 20 Whitewater State +	7	–	1	–	0	8	–	1	–	0
Oshkosh State	5	–	3	–	0	6	–	4	–	0
Eau Claire State	5	–	3	–	0	5	–	4	–	0
La Crosse State	4	–	4	–	0	5	–	5	–	0
Stout State	3	–	5	–	0	3	–	6	–	0
Stevens Point State	2	–	6	–	0	2	–	8	–	0
Superior State	2	–	6	–	0	2	–	8	–	0
River Falls State	1	–	7	–	0	2	–	8	–	0
+ – Conference co-champions; Rankings from NAIA poll

The 1969 Whitewater State Warhawks football team was an American football team that represented Wisconsin State University—Whitewater (later renamed the University of Wisconsin–Whitewater) as a member of the Wisconsin State University Conference (WSUC) during the 1969 NAIA football season. In their 14th season under head coach Forrest Perkins, the Warhawks compiled an 8–1 record and tied for the WSUC championship.

== Schedule ==
Date	Opponent	Site	Result	Source
September 13	at Stevens Point State	Stevens Point, WI	W 36–25	
September 20	Stout State	Hamilton Field; Whitewater, WI	W 27–13	
September 27	Platteville State	Hamilton Field; Whitewater, WI	W 29–23	
October 4	at Superior State	Superior, WI	W 35–0	
October 11	St. Norbert*	Hamilton Field; Whitewater, WI	W 33–26	
October 18	Eau Claire State	Hamilton Field; Whitewater, WI	W 29–13	
October 25	at River Falls State	River Falls, WI	W 48–20	
November 1	at La Crosse State	La Crosse, WI	W 35–20	
November 8	Oshkosh State	Hamilton Field; Whitewater, WI	L 13–49	
*Non-conference game
