= Steve Svitak =

American gridiron football player (1945–2024)

Profile
- Position: Linebacker

Personal information
- Born: June 1, 1945 (age 81); Oakland, California, U.S.
- Listed height: 6 ft 1 in (1.85 m)
- Listed weight: 232 lb (105 kg)

Career information
- College: Boise State
- NFL draft: 1970: 7th round, 180th overall pick

Career history
- 1972: Saskatchewan Roughriders
- 1973: Edmonton Eskimos
- 1973: BC Lions

Stephen James Svitak (born June 1, 1945 – 2024) is an American former professional football player who played for the Saskatchewan Roughriders, Edmonton Eskimos, and BC Lions. He played college football at Boise State University. Svitek died in 2024.

He was also a member the Buffalo Bills, Houston Oilers, and the Oakland Raiders in the NFL.
