= 1969 Southern Jaguars football team =

American college football season

1969 Southern Jaguars football
- Conference: Southwestern Athletic Conference
- Record: 6–2–1 (5–1–1 SWAC)
- Head coach: Alva Tabor (1st season)
- Home stadium: University Stadium

1969 Southwestern Athletic Conference football standings
| | Conf. | | | | | Overall |
| Team | W | | L | | T | W | | L | | T |
|---|---|---|---|---|---|---|---|---|---|---|
| No. 9/8 Alcorn A&M $ | 6 | – | 0 | – | 1 | 8 | – | 0 | – | 1 |
| Southern | 5 | – | 1 | – | 1 | 6 | – | 2 | – | 1 |
| Grambling | 5 | – | 2 | – | 0 | 6 | – | 4 | – | 0 |
| Texas Southern | 3 | – | 3 | – | 1 | 4 | – | 3 | – | 2 |
| Prairie View A&M | 3 | – | 4 | – | 0 | 4 | – | 5 | – | 0 |
| Arkansas AM&N | 2 | – | 4 | – | 1 | 3 | – | 6 | – | 1 |
| Jackson State | 1 | – | 6 | – | 0 | 2 | – | 6 | – | 0 |
| Mississippi Valley State | 1 | – | 6 | – | 0 | 1 | – | 8 | – | 0 |
$ – Conference champion; Rankings from NAIA poll and AP small college poll

The 1969 Southern Jaguars football team represented Southern University as a member of the Southwestern Athletic Conference (SWAC) during the 1969 NCAA College Division football season. Led by first-year head coach Alva Tabor, the Jaguars compiled an overall record of 6–2–1, with a conference record of 5–1–1, and finished second in the SWAC.

== Schedule ==
| Date | Opponent | Site | Result | Attendance | Source |
|---|---|---|---|---|---|
| September 20 | Texas Southern | University Stadium; Baton Rouge, LA | T 13–13 | | |
| September 28 | at Prairie View A&M | Astrodome; Houston, TX | W 14–6 | 22,175 | |
| October 4 | Mississippi Valley State | University Stadium; Baton Rouge, LA | W 30–7 | | |
| October 11 | Arkansas AM&N | University Stadium; Baton Rouge, LA | W 40–19 | | |
| October 18 | at Jackson State | Mississippi Veterans Memorial Stadium; Jackson, MS (rivalry) | W 47–20 | | |
| October 25 | No. 4 Alcorn A&M | University Stadium; Baton Rouge, LA | L 7–27 | 25,000 | |
| November 1 | No. 18 Tennessee State* | University Stadium; Baton Rouge, LA | W 30–22 | 13,000 | |
| November 15 | at Florida A&M* | Bragg Memorial Stadium; Tallahassee, FL | L 7–10 | 12,917 | |
| November 22 | at Grambling | Grambling Stadium; Grambling, LA (rivalry) | W 21–17 | 32,115 | |
*Non-conference game; Rankings from AP Poll released prior to the game
