= 1969 NCAA College Division football season =

American college football season

- Champion(s): North Dakota State (AP, UPI); Alcorn A&M (black)

The 1969 NCAA College Division football season was the 14th season of college football in the United States organized by the National Collegiate Athletic Association at the NCAA College Division level.

== Conference and program changes ==
=== Conference changes ===
School	1968 conference	1969 conference
Towson State	New program	Mason–Dixon Conference

== Conference standings ==
1969 Big Sky Conference football standings
	Conf.					Overall
Team	W		L		T	W		L		T
Montana $	4	–	0	–	0	10	–	1	–	0
Weber State	3	–	1	–	0	6	–	4	–	0
Idaho State	2	–	2	–	0	5	–	5	–	0
Idaho	1	–	3	–	0	2	–	8	–	0
Montana State	0	–	4	–	0	1	–	8	–	0
$ – Conference champion

1969 California Collegiate Athletic Association football standings
	Conf.					Overall
Team	W		L		T	W		L		T
Cal Poly $	2	–	0	–	0	6	–	4	–	0
Valley State	1	–	1	–	0	4	–	5	–	0
Cal Poly Pomona	1	–	2	–	0	2	–	8	–	0
UC Riverside	0	–	1	–	0	3	–	6	–	0
$ – Conference champion

1969 Central Intercollegiate Athletic Association football standings
	Conf.					Overall
Team	W		L		T	W		L		T
Johnson C. Smith $	6	–	1	–	0	8	–	2	–	0
North Carolina Central	7	–	1	–	1	7	–	2	–	1
Elizabeth City State	8	–	1	–	0	8	–	1	–	0
North Carolina A&T	5	–	1	–	1	6	–	2	–	1
Morgan State	6	–	2	–	0	6	–	4	–	0
Norfolk State	4	–	3	–	0	4	–	4	–	0
Virginia Union	5	–	4	–	0	5	–	4	–	0
Livingstone	4	–	3	–	0	5	–	3	–	0
Delaware State	3	–	3	–	0	4	–	5	–	0
Fayetteville State	3	–	3	–	1	3	–	4	–	1
Virginia State	3	–	5	–	1	3	–	5	–	1
Howard	2	–	3	–	0	3	–	6	–	0
Shaw	2	–	5	–	0	2	–	6	–	0
Maryland State	1	–	5	–	0	1	–	7	–	0
Winston-Salem State	1	–	7	–	0	2	–	7	–	0
Saint Paul's (VA)	0	–	6	–	0	1	–	7	–	0
Hampton	0	–	7	–	0	0	–	9	–	0
$ – Conference champion; Conference standings were based on the Dickinson System.

1969 College Athletic Conference football standings
	Conf.					Overall
Team	W		L		T	W		L		T
Centre $	4	–	0	–	0	6	–	4	–	0
Southwestern (TN)	2	–	2	–	0	3	–	6	–	0
Sewanee	2	–	2	–	0	2	–	6	–	0
Washington and Lee	1	–	3	–	0	4	–	5	–	0
Washington University	1	–	3	–	0	2	–	7	–	0
$ – Conference champion

1969 College Conference of Illinois and Wisconsin football standings
	Conf.					Overall
Team	W		L		T	W		L		T
No. 17 Carthage $	7	–	0	–	0	9	–	0	–	0
Augustana (IL)	6	–	1	–	0	7	–	2	–	0
Millikin	4	–	3	–	0	4	–	5	–	0
Elmhurst	3	–	4	–	0	4	–	4	–	0
Carroll (WI)	3	–	4	–	0	4	–	5	–	0
Illinois Wesleyan	3	–	4	–	0	3	–	6	–	0
North Park	2	–	5	–	0	2	–	7	–	0
North Central (IL)	0	–	7	–	0	0	–	9	–	0
$ – Conference champion; Rankings from NAIA poll

1969 Eastern Football Conference football standings
	Conf.					Overall
Team	W		L		T	W		L		T
Bridgeport $	4	–	0	–	0	8	–	2	–	0
Montclair State	3	–	1	–	0	8	–	2	–	0
Glassboro State	2	–	2	–	0	5	–	3	–	0
Central Connecticut State	1	–	3	–	0	5	–	4	–	0
Southern Connecticut State	0	–	4	–	0	1	–	8	–	0
$ – Conference champion

1969 Far Western Conference football standings
	Conf.					Overall
Team	W		L		T	W		L		T
No. 15 UPI Cal State Hayward $	5	–	0	–	0	9	–	1	–	0
No. 12 AP Sacramento State	4	–	1	–	0	8	–	2	–	0
Chico State	3	–	2	–	0	8	–	2	–	0
Humboldt State	2	–	3	–	0	6	–	4	–	0
San Francisco State	1	–	4	–	0	3	–	7	–	0
UC Davis	0	–	5	–	0	3	–	7	–	0
$ – Conference champion; Rankings from small college polls

1969 Gulf States Conference football standings
	Conf.					Overall
Team	W		L		T	W		L		T
Louisiana Tech $	5	–	0	–	0	8	–	2	–	0
Northwestern State	4	–	1	–	0	7	–	2	–	0
Southwestern Louisiana	3	–	2	–	0	5	–	5	–	0
Southeastern Louisiana	2	–	3	–	0	5	–	5	–	0
McNeese State	1	–	4	–	0	4	–	6	–	0
Northeast Louisiana	0	–	5	–	0	1	–	9	–	0
$ – Conference champion

1969 Independent College Athletic Conference football standings
	Conf.					Overall
Team	W		L		T	W		L		T
St. Lawrence $	3	–	0	–	0	7	–	1	–	0
Alfred	2	–	1	–	0	5	–	3	–	0
Hobart	1	–	2	–	0	3	–	5	–	0
RPI	0	–	3	–	0	1	–	7	–	1
$ – Conference champion

1969 Indiana Collegiate Conference football standings
	Conf.					Overall
Team	W		L		T	W		L		T
Valparaiso +	3	–	1	–	0	7	–	2	–	0
Evansville +	3	–	1	–	0	4	–	5	–	0
Butler	2	–	2	–	0	3	–	6	–	0
Saint Joseph's (IN)	1	–	3	–	0	5	–	4	–	0
DePauw	1	–	3	–	0	2	–	7	–	0
+ – Conference co-champions

1969 Interstate Intercollegiate Athletic Conference football standings
	Conf.					Overall
Team	W		L		T	W		L		T
Western Illinois $	3	–	0	–	0	8	–	2	–	0
Central Michigan	2	–	1	–	0	7	–	3	–	0
Illinois State	1	–	2	–	0	5	–	6	–	0
Eastern Illinois	0	–	3	–	0	2	–	7	–	0
$ – Conference champion

1969 Iowa Conference football standings
	Conf.					Overall
Team	W		L		T	W		L		T
Simpson (IA) $	6	–	1	–	0	8	–	2	–	0
Luther	5	–	2	–	0	7	–	2	–	0
Central (IA)	5	–	2	–	0	6	–	3	–	0
William Penn	4	–	3	–	0	6	–	3	–	0
Upper Iowa	3	–	4	–	0	3	–	5	–	0
Wartburg	3	–	4	–	0	3	–	6	–	0
Buena Vista	2	–	5	–	0	2	–	7	–	0
Dubuque	0	–	7	–	0	1	–	7	–	0
$ – Conference champion

1969 Little Three Conference football standings
	Conf.					Overall
Team	W		L		T	W		L		T
Wesleyan $	2	–	0	–	0	8	–	0	–	0
Amherst	1	–	1	–	0	6	–	2	–	0
Williams	0	–	2	–	0	4	–	4	–	0
$ – Conference champion

1969 Maine Intercollegiate Athletic Association football standings
	Conf.					Overall
Team	W		L		T	W		L		T
Bowdoin $	2	–	0	–	0	3	–	4	–	0
Colby	1	–	1	–	0	2	–	6	–	0
Bates	0	–	2	–	0	3	–	5	–	0
$ – Conference champion

1969 Mason–Dixon Conference football standings
	Conf.					Overall
Team	W		L		T	W		L		T
Randolph–Macon $	4	–	0	–	0	9	–	1	–	0
Hampden–Sydney	3	–	1	–	0	6	–	4	–	0
Western Maryland	2	–	2	–	0	3	–	6	–	0
Bridgewater	2	–	3	–	0	3	–	6	–	0
Towson State	1	–	2	–	0	4	–	4	–	1
Johns Hopkins	0	–	2	–	0	5	–	4	–	0
Gallaudet	0	–	2	–	0	1	–	6	–	0
$ – Conference champion

1969 Michigan Intercollegiate Athletic Association football standings
	Conf.					Overall
Team	W		L		T	W		L		T
Albion $	5	–	0	–	0	8	–	0	–	0
Alma	4	–	1	–	0	6	–	3	–	0
Kalamazoo	3	–	2	–	0	4	–	4	–	0
Hope	2	–	3	–	0	3	–	5	–	1
Olivet	1	–	4	–	0	1	–	8	–	0
Adrian	0	–	5	–	0	3	–	6	–	0
$ – Conference champion

1969 Middle Atlantic Conference football standings
	Conf.					Overall
Team	W		L		T	W		L		T
University Division
No. 10 Delaware x	6	–	0	–	0	9	–	2	–	0
Gettysburg	4	–	2	–	0	7	–	2	–	0
Bucknell	3	–	2	–	1	3	–	5	–	1
Lehigh	2	–	2	–	0	4	–	5	–	1
Temple	1	–	2	–	1	4	–	5	–	1
Lafayette	1	–	3	–	0	4	–	6	–	0
Hofstra	0	–	5	–	0	0	–	10	–	0
West Chester *	0	–	1	–	0	7	–	2	–	0
Northern College Division
Wilkes x	5	–	0	–	0	6	–	2	–	0
Susquehanna	5	–	1	–	0	6	–	3	–	0
Juniata	4	–	2	–	0	5	–	3	–	0
Delaware Valley	4	–	3	–	0	4	–	3	–	0
Upsala	3	–	3	–	0	4	–	4	–	0
Albright	3	–	4	–	0	3	–	6	–	0
Lycoming	1	–	7	–	0	1	–	7	–	0
Wagner *	3	–	1	–	0	4	–	5	–	0
Southern College Division
Johns Hopkins x	5	–	2	–	0	5	–	4	–	0
Lebanon Valley x	5	–	2	–	0	6	–	2	–	0
Ursinus x	5	–	2	–	0	5	–	2	–	1
Moravian	6	–	3	–	0	6	–	3	–	0
Dickinson	4	–	4	–	0	4	–	4	–	0
Muhlenberg	4	–	5	–	0	4	–	5	–	0
Swarthmore	3	–	5	–	0	3	–	5	–	0
Western Maryland	2	–	4	–	0	3	–	6	–	0
Pennsylvania Military	1	–	6	–	0	2	–	6	–	0
Haverford	1	–	6	–	0	1	–	6	–	0
Franklin & Marshall	1	–	6	–	0	1	–	7	–	0
Drexel*	2	–	1	–	0	3	–	5	–	0
x – Division champion/co-champions; * – Ineligible for championship due to insufficient conference games; Rankings from AP Poll

1969 Midwest Conference football standings
	Conf.					Overall
Team	W		L		T	W		L		T
St. Olaf $	8	–	1	–	0	8	–	1	–	0
Monmouth (IL)	7	–	2	–	0	7	–	2	–	0
Coe	6	–	3	–	0	6	–	3	–	0
Grinnell	6	–	3	–	0	6	–	3	–	0
Lawrence	6	–	3	–	0	6	–	3	–	0
Cornell (IA)	4	–	5	–	0	4	–	5	–	0
Ripon	4	–	5	–	0	4	–	5	–	0
Carleton	3	–	6	–	0	3	–	6	–	0
Knox	1	–	8	–	0	1	–	8	–	0
Beloit	0	–	9	–	0	0	–	9	–	0
$ – Conference champion

1969 Minnesota Intercollegiate Athletic Conference football standings
	Conf.					Overall
Team	W		L		T	W		L		T
No. 3 Concordia–Moorhead $^	7	–	0	–	0	10	–	1	–	0
Saint John's (MN)	5	–	1	–	1	8	–	1	–	1
Hamline	5	–	2	–	0	7	–	2	–	0
Gustavus Adolphus	4	–	2	–	1	6	–	3	–	1
Macalester	3	–	4	–	0	5	–	4	–	0
Minnesota–Duluth	2	–	5	–	0	4	–	6	–	0
St. Thomas (MN)	1	–	6	–	0	2	–	8	–	0
Augsburg	0	–	7	–	0	1	–	8	–	0
$ – Conference champion; ^ – NAIA playoff participant; Rankings from NAIA poll

1969 Missouri Intercollegiate Athletic Association football standings
	Conf.					Overall
Team	W		L		T	W		L		T
SE Missouri State +	4	–	1	–	0	8	–	2	–	0
NE Missouri State +	4	–	1	–	0	6	–	2	–	1
Missouri–Rolla	3	–	2	–	0	7	–	2	–	0
Central Missouri State	2	–	3	–	0	5	–	4	–	0
NW Missouri State	2	–	3	–	0	4	–	5	–	0
SW Missouri State	0	–	5	–	0	0	–	10	–	0
$ – Conference champion

1969 New Jersey State Athletic Conference football standings
	Conf.					Overall
Team	W		L		T	W		L		T
Montclair State $	3	–	0	–	0	8	–	2	–	0
Glassboro State	2	–	1	–	0	5	–	3	–	0
Jersey City State	1	–	2	–	0	5	–	3	–	0
Trenton State	0	–	3	–	0	4	–	4	–	0
$ – Conference champion

1969 North Central Conference football standings
	Conf.					Overall
Team	W		L		T	W		L		T
No. 1 North Dakota State $	6	–	0	–	0	10	–	0	–	0
Northern Iowa	4	–	2	–	0	5	–	5	–	0
North Dakota	3	–	3	–	0	4	–	5	–	0
South Dakota State	3	–	3	–	0	3	–	7	–	0
Morningside	2	–	4	–	0	4	–	5	–	0
South Dakota	2	–	4	–	0	3	–	7	–	0
Augustana (SD)	1	–	5	–	0	3	–	6	–	0
$ – Conference champion; Rankings from AP small college poll

1969 Northern Intercollegiate Conference football standings
	Conf.					Overall
Team	W		L		T	W		L		T
Michigan Tech $	4	–	1	–	0	5	–	4	–	0
Minnesota Morris	3	–	1	–	0	7	–	2	–	0
Moorhead State	3	–	2	–	0	4	–	5	–	0
Bemidji State	2	–	2	–	1	4	–	3	–	1
St. Cloud State	1	–	3	–	1	1	–	7	–	1
Winona State	0	–	4	–	0	2	–	7	–	0
$ – Conference champion

1969 Ohio Athletic Conference football standings
	Conf.					Overall
Team	W		L		T	W		L		T
No. 13 Wittenberg $	4	–	0	–	0	10	–	0	–	0
Marietta	6	–	1	–	0	8	–	1	–	0
Baldwin–Wallace	4	–	1	–	1	7	–	1	–	1
Denison	4	–	2	–	0	7	–	2	–	0
Muskingum	3	–	1	–	2	5	–	2	–	2
Kenyon	3	–	2	–	0	6	–	3	–	0
Ohio Wesleyan	4	–	3	–	0	5	–	4	–	0
Mount Union	3	–	3	–	0	5	–	4	–	0
Capital	3	–	4	–	0	3	–	4	–	1
Wooster	3	–	4	–	0	3	–	6	–	0
Hiram	2	–	5	–	0	3	–	5	–	0
Otterbein	1	–	4	–	1	3	–	5	–	1
Heidelberg	0	–	4	–	2	0	–	6	–	2
Oberlin	0	–	6	–	0	2	–	6	–	0
$ – Conference champion; Rankings from AP small college poll

1969 Ohio Valley Conference football standings
	Conf.					Overall
Team	W		L		T	W		L		T
No. 20/16 East Tennessee State $	6	–	0	–	1	10	–	0	–	1
Western Kentucky	5	–	2	–	0	6	–	3	–	1
Eastern Kentucky	4	–	3	–	0	6	–	4	–	0
Tennessee Tech	4	–	3	–	0	5	–	5	–	0
Morehead State	3	–	4	–	0	6	–	4	–	0
Murray State	2	–	4	–	1	5	–	4	–	1
Austin Peay	2	–	5	–	0	2	–	7	–	1
Middle Tennessee	1	–	6	–	0	1	–	9	–	0
$ – Conference champion; Rankings from AP/UPI small college polls

1969 Pennsylvania State Athletic Conference football standings
	Conf.					Overall
Team	W		L		T	W		L		T
East Division
West Chester xy$	5	–	0	–	0	8	–	2	–	0
Mansfield	4	–	2	–	0	6	–	3	–	0
East Stroudsburg	4	–	2	–	0	5	–	3	–	0
Kutztown	4	–	2	–	0	5	–	3	–	0
Bloomsburg	2	–	4	–	0	2	–	6	–	0
Millersville	1	–	5	–	0	2	–	7	–	0
Cheyney	0	–	5	–	0	0	–	8	–	0
West Division
Clarion xy	5	–	0	–	0	8	–	2	–	0
Slippery Rock	3	–	2	–	0	6	–	3	–	0
Edinboro	2	–	2	–	1	4	–	4	–	1
Lock Haven	2	–	3	–	0	3	–	4	–	0
California (PA)	1	–	3	–	1	1	–	6	–	1
Shippensburg	1	–	4	–	0	1	–	7	–	0
Championship: West Chester 41, Clarion 34
$ – Conference champion; x – Division champion/co-champions; y – Championship game participant

1969 Presidents' Athletic Conference football standings
	Conf.					Overall
Team	W		L		T	W		L		T
John Carroll $	6	–	0	–	0	7	–	1	–	0
Bethany (WV)	4	–	2	–	0	6	–	2	–	0
Thiel	4	–	2	–	0	6	–	2	–	0
Allegheny	4	–	2	–	0	5	–	3	–	0
Case Tech	1	–	5	–	0	2	–	6	–	0
Washington & Jefferson	1	–	5	–	0	1	–	7	–	0
Western Reserve	1	–	5	–	0	1	–	7	–	0
$ – Conference champion

1969 Rocky Mountain Athletic Conference football standings
	Conf.					Overall
Team	W		L		T	W		L		T
Mountain Division
Adams State * xy	6	–	1	–	0	7	–	3	–	0
Western State (CO)	5	–	1	–	0	5	–	4	–	0
Westminster (UT)	3	–	3	–	0	4	–	5	–	0
Southern Utah	2	–	3	–	0	4	–	5	–	0
Colorado Mines	1	–	3	–	0	3	–	6	–	0
Western New Mexico	1	–	4	–	0	1	–	7	–	0
Fort Lewis	1	–	5	–	0	1	–	7	–	0
Plains Division
Colorado State–Greeley xy$	5	–	0	–	0	10	–	0	–	0
Emporia State	4	–	2	–	0	6	–	3	–	0
Southern Colorado	3	–	2	–	0	7	–	2	–	0
Washburn	3	–	3	–	0	5	–	5	–	0
Nebraska–Omaha	2	–	2	–	0	3	–	6	–	0
Pittsburg State	2	–	3	–	0	5	–	5	–	0
Fort Hays State	0	–	6	–	0	0	–	9	–	0
Championship: Colorado State–Greeley 33, Adams State 14
$ – Conference champion; x – Division champion/co-champions; y – Championship game participant; * Adams State received a non-conference forfeit win from Eastern New Mexico.

1969 Southern California Intercollegiate Athletic Conference football standings
	Conf.					Overall
Team	W		L		T	W		L		T
Whittier $	4	–	0	–	0	5	–	5	–	0
No. 19 Redlands	3	–	1	–	0	7	–	2	–	0
Claremont-Mudd	3	–	2	–	0	5	–	4	–	0
Pomona	2	–	3	–	0	3	–	6	–	0
Occidental	1	–	4	–	0	1	–	8	–	0
Caltech	0	–	3	–	0	0	–	8	–	0
$ – Conference champion; Rankings from NAIA poll

1969 Southern Intercollegiate Athletic Conference football standings
	Conf.					Overall
Team	W		L		T	W		L		T
Division I
No. 16 Florida A&M x	4	–	0	–	0	8	–	1	–	0
Alabama A&M	2	–	2	–	0	6	–	3	–	0
Bethune–Cookman	1	–	2	–	1	4	–	3	–	1
South Carolina State	1	–	2	–	1	5	–	3	–	1
Morris Brown	3	–	2	–	0	4	–	5	–	0
Division II
Tuskegee x	5	–	1	–	0	7	–	3	–	0
Fort Valley State	6	–	1	–	0	7	–	2	–	0
Clark (GA)	4	–	3	–	1	4	–	4	–	1
Alabama State	4	–	3	–	0	7	–	3	–	0
Savannah State	2	–	3	–	0	3	–	5	–	0
Lane	2	–	3	–	1	2	–	6	–	1
Morehouse	2	–	4	–	0	4	–	5	–	0
Fisk	2	–	5	–	0	3	–	6	–	0
Knoxville	1	–	6	–	0	1	–	6	–	0
x – Division champion/co-champions; Rankings from AP small college poll

1969 Southland Conference football standings
	Conf.					Overall
Team	W		L		T	W		L		T
No. 7 Arkansas State $	4	–	0	–	0	8	–	1	–	1
Abilene Christian	2	–	2	–	0	8	–	2	–	0
UT Arlington	2	–	2	–	0	5	–	5	–	0
Trinity (TX)	2	–	2	–	0	4	–	6	–	0
Lamar Tech	0	–	4	–	0	3	–	7	–	0
$ – Conference champion; Rankings from AP small college poll

1969 Southwestern Athletic Conference football standings
	Conf.					Overall
Team	W		L		T	W		L		T
No. 9/8 Alcorn A&M $	6	–	0	–	1	8	–	0	–	1
Southern	5	–	1	–	1	6	–	2	–	1
Grambling	5	–	2	–	0	6	–	4	–	0
Texas Southern	3	–	3	–	1	4	–	3	–	2
Prairie View A&M	3	–	4	–	0	4	–	5	–	0
Arkansas AM&N	2	–	4	–	1	3	–	6	–	1
Jackson State	1	–	6	–	0	2	–	6	–	0
Mississippi Valley State	1	–	6	–	0	1	–	8	–	0
$ – Conference champion; Rankings from NAIA poll and AP small college poll

1969 Yankee Conference football standings
	Conf.					Overall
Team	W		L		T	W		L		T
UMass $	5	–	0	–	0	6	–	3	–	0
Connecticut	3	–	2	–	0	5	–	4	–	0
Maine	3	–	2	–	0	5	–	4	–	0
Vermont	2	–	3	–	0	3	–	6	–	0
New Hampshire	1	–	4	–	0	3	–	5	–	0
Rhode Island	1	–	4	–	0	2	–	7	–	0
$ – Conference champion

1969 NCAA College Division independents football records
	Conf.			Overall
Team	W	L	T	W		L		T
No. 3 Akron		–		9	–	1	–	0
Indiana (PA)		–		8	–	1	–	0
Boston University		–		9	–	2	–	0
No. 9 Tampa		–		8	–	2	–	0
Tennessee State		–		7	–	1	–	1
Colorado College		–		6	–	2	–	0
Drake		–		7	–	2	–	2
Northern Arizona		–		7	–	3	–	0
Illinois College		–		5	–	2	–	1
Mankato State		–		6	–	3	–	0
Hawaii		–		6	–	3	–	1
Indiana State		–		6	–	3	–	1
Ashland		–		5	–	3	–	1
Lincoln (MO)		–		5	–	3	–	1
Portland State		–		6	–	4	–	0
Santa Clara		–		6	–	4	–	0
UNLV		–		6	–	4	–	0
Eastern Michigan		–		5	–	4	–	0
St. Norbert		–		5	–	4	–	0
Cortland		–		4	–	4	–	0
Northern Michigan		–		5	–	5	–	0
Nevada		–		5	–	5	–	0
Rose Poly		–		4	–	4	–	0
Southern Illinois		–		5	–	5	–	0
Wayne State (MI)		–		4	–	4	–	0
Chattanooga		–		4	–	6	–	0
Chicago		–		2	–	4	–	0
Milwaukee		–		3	–	6	–	0
Northeastern		–		3	–	6	–	0
Wabash		–		3	–	6	–	0
Wheaton (IL)		–		3	–	6	–	0
Samford		–		2	–	6	–	1
Lake Forest		–		2	–	6	–	0
Parsons		–		2	–	8	–	0
Kentucky State		–		0	–	8	–	0
Rankings from AP small college poll

== Rankings ==
College Division teams (also referred to as "small college") were ranked in polls by the AP (a panel of writers) and by UPI (coaches). The national champion(s) for each season were determined by the final poll rankings, published at or near the end of the regular season, before any bowl games were played.

=== Small college final polls ===
In 1969, both services ranked 9–0 North Dakota State first and 10–0 Montana second. They later met in the Camellia Bowl, which North Dakota State won, 30–3.

United Press International (coaches) final poll
Published on November 26

Rank	School	Record	No. 1 votes	Total points
1	North Dakota State	9–0	24	319
2	Montana	10–0	8	295
3	Colorado State–Greeley	10–0	1	197
4	Akron	9–1		186
5	Arkansas State	8–1–1^{note1}		173
6	Tampa	9–1^{note2}		114
7	Louisiana Tech	8–1		110
8	New Mexico Highlands	8–0–1		108
9	Texas A&I	9–1		89
10	Delaware	8–2		64

^note1Arkansas State actually 7–1–1 when the poll was taken.
^note2Tampa actually 8–1 when the poll was taken.

Associated Press (writers) final poll
Published on November 27

Rank	School	Record	No. 1 votes	Total points
1	North Dakota State	9–0	10	225
2	Montana	10–0	1	219
3	Akron	9–1	1	176
4	Louisiana Tech	8–1		152
5	Colorado State–Greeley	10–0		131
6	New Mexico Highlands	8–0–1		129
7	Arkansas State	7–1–1		115
8	Alcorn A&M	7–0–1		107
9	Tampa	8–1		92
10	Delaware	8–2		70

== Bowl games ==
The postseason consisted of four bowl games as regional finals, all played on December 13. The Grantland Rice Bowl moved from Murfreesboro, Tennessee to Baton Rouge, Louisiana.

Bowl	Region	Location	Winning team		Losing team		Ref
Boardwalk	East	Atlantic City, New Jersey	Delaware	31	North Carolina Central	13	
Grantland Rice	Mideast	Baton Rouge, Louisiana	East Tennessee State	34	Louisiana Tech	14	
Pecan	Midwest	Arlington, Texas	Arkansas State	29	Drake	14	
Camellia	West	Sacramento, California	North Dakota State	30	Montana	3	

== See also ==
- 1969 NCAA University Division football season
- 1969 NAIA football season
