= 1969 Grambling Tigers football team =

American college football season

1969 Grambling Tigers football

Orange Blossom Classic, L 19–23 vs. Florida A&M
- Conference: Southwestern Athletic Conference
- Record: 6–4 (5–2 SWAC)
- Head coach: Eddie Robinson (27th season)
- Home stadium: Grambling Stadium

1969 Southwestern Athletic Conference football standings
	Conf.					Overall
Team	W		L		T	W		L		T
No. 9/8 Alcorn A&M $	6	–	0	–	1	8	–	0	–	1
Southern	5	–	1	–	1	6	–	2	–	1
Grambling	5	–	2	–	0	6	–	4	–	0
Texas Southern	3	–	3	–	1	4	–	3	–	2
Prairie View A&M	3	–	4	–	0	4	–	5	–	0
Arkansas AM&N	2	–	4	–	1	3	–	6	–	1
Jackson State	1	–	6	–	0	2	–	6	–	0
Mississippi Valley State	1	–	6	–	0	1	–	8	–	0
$ – Conference champion; Rankings from NAIA poll and AP small college poll

The 1969 Grambling Tigers football team represented Grambling College (now known as Grambling State University) as a member of the Southwestern Athletic Conference (SWAC) during the 1969 NCAA College Division football season. Led by 27th-year head coach Eddie Robinson, the Tigers compiled an overall record of 6–4 and a mark of 5–2 in conference play, and finished third in the SWAC.

== Schedule ==
Date	Opponent	Site	Result	Attendance	Source
September 12	vs. Alcorn A&M	Los Angeles Memorial Coliseum; Los Angeles, CA (Freedom Classic)	L 7–28	62,294	
September 20	vs. Morgan State*	Yankee Stadium; Bronx, NY	W 30–12	60,118	
October 4	Prairie View A&M	Grambling Stadium; Grambling, LA (rivalry)	W 58–25	11,072	
October 11	at Tennessee State*	Hale Stadium; Nashville, TN	L 20–34	7,667	
October 18	Mississippi Valley State	Grambling Stadium; Grambling, LA	W 41–14	14,167	
October 25	at Jackson State	Mississippi Veterans Memorial Stadium; Jackson, MS	W 62–13	13,992	
November 8	at Arkansas AM&N	Pumphrey Stadium; Pine Bluff, AR	W 42–0		
November 15	at Texas Southern	Houston Astrodome; Houston, TX	W 28–26		
November 22	Southern	Grambling Stadium; Grambling, LA (rivalry)	L 17–21	32,115	
December 6	vs. Florida A&M*	Miami Orange Bowl; Miami, FL (Orange Blossom Classic)	L 19–23	36,680	
*Non-conference game
