= 1969 Alcorn A&M Braves football team =

American college football season

1969 Alcorn A&M Braves football

Black college football national champion SWAC champion
- Conference: Southwestern Athletic Conference

Ranking
- Coaches: No. 9
- AP: No. 8
- Record: 8–0–1 (6–0–1 SWAC)
- Head coach: Marino Casem (4th season)

1969 Southwestern Athletic Conference football standings
	Conf.					Overall
Team	W		L		T	W		L		T
No. 9/8 Alcorn A&M $	6	–	0	–	1	8	–	0	–	1
Southern	5	–	1	–	1	6	–	2	–	1
Grambling	5	–	2	–	0	6	–	4	–	0
Texas Southern	3	–	3	–	1	4	–	3	–	2
Prairie View A&M	3	–	4	–	0	4	–	5	–	0
Arkansas AM&N	2	–	4	–	1	3	–	6	–	1
Jackson State	1	–	6	–	0	2	–	6	–	0
Mississippi Valley State	1	–	6	–	0	1	–	8	–	0
$ – Conference champion; Rankings from NAIA poll and AP small college poll

The 1969 Alcorn A&M Braves football team was an American football team that represented Alcorn A&M University in the Southwestern Athletic Conference (SWAC) during 1969 NCAA College Division football season. In their fourth season under head coach Marino Casem, Alcorn compiled an 8–0–1 record (6–0–1 against conference opponents), won the SWAC championship, and outscored opponents by a total of 274 to 82.

Alcorn A&M was also recognized as the black college national champion and was ranked No. 8 in the final AP small college rankings.

== Schedule ==
Date	Opponent	Rank	Site	Result	Attendance	Source
September 12	vs. Grambling		Los Angeles Memorial Coliseum; Los Angeles, CA (Freedom Classic)	W 28–7	62,294	
September 27	at Kentucky State*		Frankfort, KY	W 20–13	1,500	
October 11	at Texas Southern	No. 9	Public Schools Stadium; Galveston, TX	W 13–0	8,000	
October 18	Lane*	No. 5	Henderson Stadium; Lorman, MS	W 43–0		
October 25	at Southern	No. 4	University Stadium; Baton Rouge, LA	W 27–7	25,000	
November 1	Arkansas AM&N	No. 2	Henderson Stadium; Lorman, MS	T 23–23		
November 8	vs. Mississippi Valley State	No. 6	City Park Stadium; Vicksburg, MS	W 41–10		
November 15	Prairie View A&M	No. 6	Henderson Stadium; Lorman, MS	W 29–14		
November 27	at Jackson State	No. 5	Mississippi Veterans Memorial Stadium; Jackson, MS	W 50–8	20,000	
*Non-conference game; Rankings from AP Poll released prior to the game
