= 1969 Florida A&M Rattlers football team =

American college football season

1969 Florida A&M Rattlers football

SIAC Division I champion

Orange Blossom Classic, W 23–19 vs. Grambling
- Conference: Southern Intercollegiate Athletic Conference
- Division I
- Record: 8–1 (4–0 SIAC)
- Head coach: Jake Gaither (25th season)
- Home stadium: Bragg Memorial Stadium

1969 Southern Intercollegiate Athletic Conference football standings
	Conf.					Overall
Team	W		L		T	W		L		T
Division I
No. 16 Florida A&M x	4	–	0	–	0	8	–	1	–	0
Alabama A&M	2	–	2	–	0	6	–	3	–	0
Bethune–Cookman	1	–	2	–	1	4	–	3	–	1
South Carolina State	1	–	2	–	1	5	–	3	–	1
Morris Brown	3	–	2	–	0	4	–	5	–	0
Division II
Tuskegee x	5	–	1	–	0	7	–	3	–	0
Fort Valley State	6	–	1	–	0	7	–	2	–	0
Clark (GA)	4	–	3	–	1	4	–	4	–	1
Alabama State	4	–	3	–	0	7	–	3	–	0
Savannah State	2	–	3	–	0	3	–	5	–	0
Lane	2	–	3	–	1	2	–	6	–	1
Morehouse	2	–	4	–	0	4	–	5	–	0
Fisk	2	–	5	–	0	3	–	6	–	0
Knoxville	1	–	6	–	0	1	–	6	–	0
x – Division champion/co-champions; Rankings from AP small college poll

The 1969 Florida A&M Rattlers football team was an American football team that represented Florida A&M University as a member of Division I of the Southern Intercollegiate Athletic Conference (SIAC) during the 1969 NCAA College Division football season. In their 25th and final season under head coach Jake Gaither, the Rattlers compiled an 8–1 record with a mark of 4–0 in conference play, winning the SIAC Division I title. Florida A&M was ranked No. 16 in the final AP small college poll, and defeated Grambling in the Orange Blossom Classic.

== Schedule ==
Date	Opponent	Site	Result	Attendance	Source
October 4	South Carolina State	Bragg Memorial Stadium; Tallahassee, FL	W 27–7	10,521–15,086	
October 11	at Alabama A&M	Milton Frank Stadium; Huntsville, AL	W 42–14	8,963	
October 18	Morris Brown	Bragg Memorial Stadium; Tallahassee, FL	W 45–15	13,731	
October 25	at Tennessee State*	Hale Stadium; Nashville, TN	L 20–33	19,181–21,181	
November 8	at North Carolina A&T*	World War Memorial Stadium; Greensboro, NC	W 26–9	19,501	
November 15	Southern*	Bragg Memorial Stadium; Tallahassee, FL	W 10–7	12,917	
November 22	Bethune–Cookman	Bragg Memorial Stadium; Tallahassee, FL	W 60–15	12,406	
November 29	at Tampa*	Tampa Stadium; Tampa, FL	W 34–28	46,477	
December 6	vs. Grambling*	Miami Orange Bowl; Miami, FL (Orange Blossom Classic)	W 23–19	36,680	
*Non-conference game; Source:
