= 1969 Texas Southern Tigers football team =

American college football season

1969 Texas Southern Tigers football
- Conference: Southwestern Athletic Conference
- Record: 4–3–2 (3–3–1 SWAC)
- Head coach: Clifford Paul (5th season)
- Home stadium: Astrodome; Jeppesen Stadium; Rice Stadium

1969 Southwestern Athletic Conference football standings
	Conf.					Overall
Team	W		L		T	W		L		T
No. 9/8 Alcorn A&M $	6	–	0	–	1	8	–	0	–	1
Southern	5	–	1	–	1	6	–	2	–	1
Grambling	5	–	2	–	0	6	–	4	–	0
Texas Southern	3	–	3	–	1	4	–	3	–	2
Prairie View A&M	3	–	4	–	0	4	–	5	–	0
Arkansas AM&N	2	–	4	–	1	3	–	6	–	1
Jackson State	1	–	6	–	0	2	–	6	–	0
Mississippi Valley State	1	–	6	–	0	1	–	8	–	0
$ – Conference champion; Rankings from NAIA poll and AP small college poll

The 1969 Texas Southern Tigers football team was an American football team that represented Texas Southern University as a member of the Southwestern Athletic Conference (SWAC) during the 1969 NAIA Division I football season. Led by fifth-year head coach Clifford Paul, the Tigers compiled an overall record of 4–3–2, with a mark of 3–3–1 in conference play, and finished fourth in the SWAC.

== Schedule ==
Date	Opponent	Site	Result	Attendance	Source
September 20	at Southern	University Stadium; Baton Rouge, LA	T 13–13		
October 4	Tennessee State*	Rice Stadium; Houston, TX	T 26–26	13,000	
October 11	No. 9 Alcorn A&M	Jeppesen Stadium; Houston, TX	L 0–13	8,000	
October 18	Arkansas AM&N	Jeppesen Stadium; Houston, TX	L 20–21		
October 25	at Mississippi Valley State	Magnolia Stadium; Itta Bena, MS	W 55–7		
November 15	Grambling	Astrodome; Houston, TX	L 26–28		
November 8	Jackson State^{†}	Jeppesen Stadium; Houston, TX	W 35–8	8,000	
November 27	Prairie View A&M	Astrodome; Houston, TX (rivalry)	W 10–0		
December 6	Morgan State*	Astrodome; Houston, TX	W 44–20	5,000	
*Non-conference game; ^{†}Homecoming; Rankings from AP Poll released prior to the game
