= 1969 small college football rankings =

- Selectors: AP, UPI
- No. 1: North Dakota State
- Small college football rankings (AP, UPI)
- «1968 1970»

The 1969 small college football rankings are rankings of college football teams representing smaller college and university teams during the 1969 college football season, including the 1969 NCAA College Division football season and the 1969 NAIA football season. Separate rankings were published by the Associated Press (AP) and the United Press International (UPI). The AP rankings were selected by a board of sports writers, and the UPI rankings were selected by a board of small-college coaches.

The 1969 North Dakota State Bison football team compiled a perfect 10–0 record and was rated No. 1 by both the AP and UPI. Montana compiled a 10–0 record in the regular season and was ranked No. 2 by both the AP and UPI. North Dakota State and Montana met in the post-season Camellia Bowl with North Dakota State prevailing by a 30–3 score.

== Legend ==
	Increase in ranking
	Decrease in ranking
	Not ranked previous week
(#–#)	Win–loss record
(Italics)	Number of first place votes
т	Tied with team above or below also with this symbol

== AP poll ==
	Week 1 Sept 25	Week 2 Oct 2	Week 3 Oct 9	Week 4 Oct 16	Week 5 Oct 23	Week 6 Oct 30	Week 7 Nov 6	Week 8 Nov 13	Week 9 Nov 20	Week 10 Nov 27	
1.	North Dakota State (4)	North Dakota State (3–0) (7)	North Dakota State (4–0) (7)	North Dakota State (5–0) (6)	North Dakota State (6–0) (9)	North Dakota State (7–0) (5)	North Dakota State (8–0) (10)	North Dakota State (9–0) (11)	North Dakota State (9–0) (10)	North Dakota State (9–0) (10)	1.
2.	IUP (1)	IUP (2–0) (1)	IUP (3–0) (2)	IUP (4–0) (3)	Montana (6–0) (1)	Alcorn A&M (5–0)	Montana (8–0) (1)	Montana (9–0) (1)	Montana (9–0)	Montana (10–0) (1)	2.
3.	Grambling	Grambling (1–1)	Texas A&I (3–0) (1)	Texas A&I (4–0) (1)	Texas A&I (5–0) (1)	Montana (7–0) (2)	Delaware (6–1)	Delaware (7–1)	Akron (9–1) (1)	Akron (9–1) (1)	3.
4.	Northern Arizona	Texas A&I (2–0) (3)	Montana (3–0)	Montana (5–0) (1)	Alcorn A&M (4–0)	Texas A&I (6–0)	Arkansas State (5–1)	Akron (8–1) (1)	Louisiana Tech (7–1)	Louisiana Tech (8–1)	4.
5.	Arkansas State	Lenoir–Rhyne (2–0) (1)	Grambling (2–1)	Alcorn A&M (3–0) (1)	IUP (5–0) (1)	Louisiana Tech (5–0) (2)	Akron (7–1) (1)	New Mexico Highlands (7–0–1) (1)	Alcorn A&M (7–0–1)	Colorado State College (10–0) (1)	5.
6.	Weber State	Alcorn A&M (2–1) (2)	Delaware (2–1)	Delaware (3–1)	Sacramento State	Sacramento State	Alcorn A&M (5–0–1)	Alcorn A&M (6–0–1)	New Mexico Highlands (8–0–1)	New Mexico Highlands (8–0–1)	6.
7.	Akron (2)	Weber State (2–1)	Sacramento State (2–1)	Akron (4–1) (1)	East Tennessee State (6–0)	Delaware (5–1)	New Mexico Highlands (6–0–1)	Louisiana Tech (6–1)	Colorado State College (9–0) (1)	Arkansas State (7–1–1)	7.
8.	Delaware	Northern Arizona (2–1)	Lenoir–Rhyne (3–1)	Sacramento State (3–1)	Delaware (4–1)	Akron (6–1) (1)	Louisiana Tech (5–1)	Arkansas State (6–1–1)	Tampa (6–2–1)	Alcorn A&M (7–0–1)	8.
9.	Texas A&I	Montana (3–0)	Alcorn A&M (2–0)	Lenoir–Rhyne (4–1) (2)	Akron (5–1) (1)	New Mexico Highlands (5–0–1)	Texas A&I (6–1) (1) т	Northern Arizona (7–2)	Arkansas State (6–1–1)	Tampa (7–2–1)	9.
10.	Tennessee State	Northwestern State (2–1)	Akron (3–1) (1)	East Tennessee State (5–0)	Abilene Christian (5–0)	Humboldt State (6–0)	Wittenberg т	Texas A&I (7–1) (1)	Sacramento State (7–2)	Delaware (8–2)	10.
11.	Northwestern State (1) (Note: In the actual printed polls, Northwestern State was listed as Northwestern Louisiana)	Sacramento State (1–1)	Northern Arizona (3–1)	Florida A&M (3–0)	Lenoir–Rhyne (5–0)	Arkansas State (4–1) (1)	Abilene Christian (6–1)	Tampa (6–1)	Wittenberg (8–0)	Texas A&I (9–1) (1)	11.
12.	Sacramento State	Delaware (1–1)	Central Missouri State (3–0)	Abilene Christian (4–0)	Louisiana Tech (4–0)	East Tennessee State (6–0–1)	Northern Arizona (6–2)	Sacramento State	Texas A&I (8–1) (1)	Sacramento State (8–2)	12.
13.	Florida A&M	Florida A&M (0–0)	Florida A&M (1–0)	Northern Arizona (4–1)	Florida A&M (3–0)	Troy State (6–0–1)	East Tennessee State (6–0–1)	Abilene Christian (7–1)	Western Carolina (9–0) (1)	Wittenberg (9–0)	13.
14.	South Dakota	Northern Michigan (1–1)	Arkansas State (2–1)	New Mexico Highlands (3–0–1)	New Mexico Highlands (4–0–1)	Northern Arizona (5–2)	Western Carolina (7–0) (1)	Western Carolina (8–0) (2)	Delaware (7–2)	Colorado College (7–2)	14.
15.	Troy State	Morehead State (2–0)	Weber State (2–2)	Wilkes (3–0)	Indiana State	Wittenberg	Colorado State College (7–0)	Colorado State College (8–0)	St. Olaf (8–1)	Northern Arizona (7–3)	15.
16.	New Mexico Highlands	Arkansas State (2–1)	Humboldt State (3–0)	Arkansas State (2–1)	Colorado State College (5–0)	Abilene Christian (5–1)	Sacramento State	IUP (7–0–1)	IUP (8–1)	Florida A&M (6–1)	16.
17.	Montana State	Troy State (2–0–1)	Wilkes (2–0)	Louisiana Tech (3–0)	Northern Arizona (4–2)	Western Carolina (6–0) (1)	Humboldt State (6–1)	East Tennessee State (7–0–1)	Western Illinois (8–2) (1)	Concordia (MN) (9–0)	17.
18.	Morehead State	New Mexico Highlands (1–0–1) т	New Mexico Highlands (2–0–1)	Central Michigan (4–1)	Wittenberg	Tennessee State	IUP (6–1)	Wittenberg	Florida A&M (5–1)	IUP (8–1)	18.
19.	Lenoir–Rhyne	Akron (2–1) т	Fairmont State (4–0) (Note: In the actual printed polls, Fairmont State was listed as Fairmont)	Fairmont State (5–0) (1)	Humboldt State (5–0)	IUP (5–1)	Tampa (6–1)	Western Illinois (1)	Colorado College (6–2)	St. Olaf (8–1)	19.
20.	Wilkes	Wilkes (1–0)	Wittenberg (2–0)	Idaho State (4–0)	Troy State (5–0–1)	Colorado State College (6–0)	Indiana State	Indiana State	Northern Arizona (7–3)	East Tennessee State (9–0–1)	20.
	Week 1 Sept 25	Week 2 Oct 2	Week 3 Oct 9	Week 4 Oct 16	Week 5 Oct 23	Week 6 Oct 30	Week 7 Nov 6	Week 8 Nov 13	Week 9 Nov 20	Week 10 Nov 27	
		Dropped: 10 Tennessee State; 14 South Dakota; 17 Montana State	Dropped: 10 Northwestern State; 14 Northern Michigan; 15 Morehead State; 17 Troy State	Dropped: 5 Grambling; 12 Central Missouri State; 15 Weber State; 16 Humboldt State; 20 Wittenberg	Dropped: 15 Wilkes; 16 Arkansas State; 18 Central Michigan; 19 Fairmont State; 20 Idaho State	Dropped: 11 Lenoir–Rhyne; 13 Florida A&M; 15 Indiana State	Dropped: 13 Troy State; 18 Tennessee State	Dropped: 17 Humboldt State	Dropped: 13 Abilene Christian; 17 East Tennessee State; 20 Indiana State	Dropped: 13 Western Carolina; 17 Western Illinois	

== UPI coaches poll ==
	Week 1 Sept 24	Week 2 Oct 1	Week 3 Oct 8	Week 4 Oct 15	Week 5 Oct 22	Week 6 Oct 29	Week 7 Nov 5	Week 8 Nov 12	Week 9 Nov 19	Week 10 Nov 26	
1.	North Dakota State (2–0) (22)	North Dakota State (3–0) (32)	North Dakota State (4–0) (27)	North Dakota State (5–0) (28)	North Dakota State (6–0) (24)	North Dakota State (7–0) (20)	North Dakota State (8–0) (28)	North Dakota State (9–0) (22)	North Dakota State (9–0) (20)	North Dakota State (9–0) (24)	1.
2.	Texas A&I (1–0)	Texas A&I (2–0)	Texas A&I (3–0)	Texas A&I (4–0)	Texas A&I (5–0)	Texas A&I (6–0)	Montana (8–0) (1)	Montana (9–0) (5)	Montana (10–0) (12)	Montana (10–0) (8)	2.
3.	Arkansas State (1–0) (6)	Humboldt State (2–0)	Humboldt State (3–0)	Montana (5–0)	Montana (6–0) (2)	Montana (7–0) (6)	Arkansas State (5–1) (1)	Delaware (7–1) (5)	Colorado State College (9–0) (1)	Colorado State College (10–0) (1)	3.
4.	Eastern Kentucky (1–0)	Alcorn A&M (2–0)	Montana (4–0) (1)	Humboldt State (4–0)	Troy State (5–0–1) (1)	Troy State (6–0–1) (1)	Delaware (6–1) (3)	Colorado State College (8–0) (1)	Akron (9–1)	Akron (9–1)	4.
5.	Weber State (2–0) (1)	Troy State (2–0–1)	Arkansas State (2–1) (2)	Troy State (4–0–1)	Humboldt State (5–0)	Arkansas State (4–1) (1)	New Mexico Highlands (6–0–1)	Akron (8–1)	Arkansas State (7–1–1)	Arkansas State (8–1–1)	5.
6.	Delaware (1–0)	Fresno State (2–0)	Troy State (3–0–1)	Arkansas State (2–1) (1)	Arkansas State (3–1) (1)	Humboldt State (6–0)	Colorado State College (7–0) (1)	New Mexico Highlands (7–0–1)	New Mexico Highlands (8–0–1)	Tampa (9–1)	6.
7.	Humboldt State (1–0)	Montana (3–0)	Alcorn A&M (2–0)	Alcorn A&M (3–0) (1)	Alcorn A&M (4–0) (1)	Delaware (5–1) (1)	Akron (7–1)	Arkansas State (6–1–1)	Tampa (7–1)	Louisiana Tech (8–1)	7.
8.	Troy State (1–0–1)	Arkansas State (1–1)	Delaware (2–1)	Delaware (3–1)	Delaware (4–1) (2)	Alcorn A&M (5–0) (1)	Texas A&I (6–1)	Texas A&I (7–1)	Louisiana Tech (7–1)	New Mexico Highlands (8–0–1)	8.
9.	Alcorn A&M (1–0) (2)	Delaware (1–1)	IUP (3–0) (1)	New Mexico Highlands (3–0–1)	New Mexico Highlands (4–0–1)	Louisiana Tech (5–0) (2)	Tampa (6–1)	Tampa (6–1)	Texas A&I (8–1)	Texas A&I (9–1)	9.
10.	Adams State (1–0)	IUP (2–0)	New Mexico Highlands (2–0–1)	IUP (4–0) (1)	IUP (5–0) (1)	New Mexico Highlands (5–0–1) (2)	Alcorn A&M (5–0–1)	Alcorn A&M (6–0–1)	Delaware (7–2)	Delaware (8–2)	10.
11.	Akron (1–0) (2)	Adams State (2–0)	East Tennessee State (4–0)	East Tennessee State (5–0) т	Abilene Christian (5–0)	Colorado State College (6–0) (1)	Louisiana Tech (5–1)	Louisiana Tech (6–1)	Alcorn A&M (7–0–1)	Troy State (8–1–1)	11.
12.	IUP (1–0)	Weber State (2–1)	Abilene Christian (4–0)	Idaho State (3–1) (1) т	East Tennessee State (6–0)	Akron (6–1)	IUP (6–1)	East Tennessee State (7–0–1)	Troy State (8–1–1)	Concordia (MN) (9–0)	12.
13.	Northern Arizona (1–0)	Santa Clara (2–0)	Northern Michigan (3–1)	Abilene Christian (4–0)	Akron (5–1)	Tampa (5–1)	East Tennessee State (6–0–1) т	Western Carolina (8–0) (1)	Western Carolina (9–0) (1)	Alcorn A&M (8–0–1)	13.
14.	Fresno State (1–0)	East Tennessee State (3–0)	Lenoir–Rhyne (3–0) (1)	Lenoir–Rhyne (4–0) (1)	Colorado State College (5–0) (1) т	IUP (5–1)	Troy State (6–1–1) т	Concordia (MN) (9–0) т	Cal State Hayward (8–1)	Southwestern Oklahoma State (8–1)	14.
15.	New Mexico Highlands (0–0–1)	Abilene Christian (3–0)	Northeastern Oklahoma	Akron (4–1)	Lenoir–Rhyne (5–0) (1) т	East Tennessee State (6–0–1)	Concordia (MN) (9–0)	Abilene Christian (7–1) т	East Tennessee State (8–0–1)	Cal State Hayward (9–1) (1)	15.
16.	Grambling (1–1)	Eastern Michigan (2–0)	Idaho State (2–1) (1)	Northeastern Oklahoma (1)	Louisiana Tech	Concordia (MN) (8–0)	Abilene Christian (6–1)	IUP (7–0–1)	Concordia (MN) (9–0)	East Tennessee State (9–0–1)	16.
17.	Florida A&M (0–0)	New Mexico Highlands (1–0–1)	Akron (3–1)	Fresno State (3–1)	Idaho State (3–2)	Western Carolina (6–0)	Northern Arizona (6–2)	Northern Arizona (7–2)	IUP (8–0–1)	Hillsdale (9–1)	17.
18.	Santa Clara (1–0) (1)	Eastern Kentucky (1–1)	Northern Arizona (2–1) т	Colorado State College (4–0) (1)	Tampa	Northeastern Oklahoma (5–1)	Humboldt State (6–1)	Northeastern Oklahoma (7–1) (1)	Southwestern Oklahoma State (8–1)	IUP (8–0–1)	18.
19.	Western Kentucky (0–0–1)	Connecticut (2–0) т	Fresno State (2–1) т	Northern Arizona (3–1)	Missouri–Rolla (5–0) (1)	Abilene Christian (5–1)	Western Carolina (7–0)	Southwestern Oklahoma State	Northeastern Oklahoma (9–1)	Northeastern Oklahoma (9–1)	19.
20.	Montana (2–0) т	Northern Michigan (2–1) т	Colorado State College (3–0) (1)	Missouri–Rolla (Note: In the actual printed polls, Missouri–Rolla was listed as Missouri at Rolla)	Florida A&M (3–0)	Southwestern Oklahoma State (Note: In the actual printed polls, Southwestern Oklahoma State was listed as Southwestern Oklahoma)	Northeastern Oklahoma (6–1) (1)	Troy State (7–1–1)	Wofford (7–2)	Wofford (8–2) (1)	20.
21.	Texas–Arlington (1–0) т	Lenoir–Rhyne (2–0) т									21.
22.	Abilene Christian (2–0) т										22.
	Week 1 Sept 24	Week 2 Oct 1	Week 3 Oct 8	Week 4 Oct 15	Week 5 Oct 22	Week 6 Oct 29	Week 7 Nov 5	Week 8 Nov 12	Week 9 Nov 19	Week 10 Nov 26	
		Dropped: 11 Akron; 13 Northern Arizona; 16 Grambling; 17 Florida A&M; 19 Western Kentucky; 20 Texas–Arlington	Dropped: 11 Adams State; 12 Weber State; 13 Santa Clara; 16 Eastern Michigan; 18 Eastern Kentucky; 19 Connecticut	Dropped: 13 Northern Michigan	Dropped: 16 Northeastern Oklahoma; 17 Fresno State; 19 Northern Arizona	Dropped: 15 Lenoir–Rhyne; 17 Idaho State; 19 Missouri–Rolla; 20 Florida A&M	Dropped: 20 Southwestern Oklahoma State	Dropped: 18 Humboldt State	Dropped: 15 Abilene Christian; 17 Northern Arizona	Dropped: 13 Western Carolina	

== HBCU rankings ==
The New Pittsburgh Courier, a leading African American newspaper, ranked the top 1969 teams from historically black colleges and universities in an era when college football was often racially segregated.

The rankings were published on December 20:

- 1. Alcorn A&M (8–0–1)
- 2. Tennessee State (7–1–1)
- 3. Florida A&M (8–1)
- 4. Southern (6–2–1)
- 5. Grambling (6–4)
- 6. Texas Southern (4–3–2)
- 7. North Carolina College (7–2–1)
- 8. North Carolina A&T (6–2–1)
- 9. Johnson C. Smith (8–2)
- 10. Morgan State (6–4)
- 11. South Carolina State (4–3–1)
- 12. Virginia Union (5–4)
- 13. Tuskegee (7–3)
- 14. Elizabeth City State (8–1)
- 15. Fort Valley State (7–2)
