= 1969 Ball State Cardinals football team =

American college football season

1969 Ball State Cardinals football
- Conference: Independent
- Record: 5–5
- Head coach: Wave Myers (2nd season)
- Home stadium: Ball State Stadium

1969 NCAA College Division independents football records
	Conf.			Overall
Team	W	L	T	W		L		T
No. 3 Akron		–		9	–	1	–	0
Indiana (PA)		–		8	–	1	–	0
Boston University		–		9	–	2	–	0
No. 9 Tampa		–		8	–	2	–	0
Tennessee State		–		7	–	1	–	1
Colorado College		–		6	–	2	–	0
Drake		–		7	–	2	–	2
Northern Arizona		–		7	–	3	–	0
Illinois College		–		5	–	2	–	1
Mankato State		–		6	–	3	–	0
Hawaii		–		6	–	3	–	1
Indiana State		–		6	–	3	–	1
Ashland		–		5	–	3	–	1
Lincoln (MO)		–		5	–	3	–	1
Portland State		–		6	–	4	–	0
Santa Clara		–		6	–	4	–	0
UNLV		–		6	–	4	–	0
Eastern Michigan		–		5	–	4	–	0
St. Norbert		–		5	–	4	–	0
Cortland		–		4	–	4	–	0
Northern Michigan		–		5	–	5	–	0
Nevada		–		5	–	5	–	0
Rose Poly		–		4	–	4	–	0
Southern Illinois		–		5	–	5	–	0
Wayne State (MI)		–		4	–	4	–	0
Chattanooga		–		4	–	6	–	0
Chicago		–		2	–	4	–	0
Milwaukee		–		3	–	6	–	0
Northeastern		–		3	–	6	–	0
Wabash		–		3	–	6	–	0
Wheaton (IL)		–		3	–	6	–	0
Samford		–		2	–	6	–	1
Lake Forest		–		2	–	6	–	0
Parsons		–		2	–	8	–	0
Kentucky State		–		0	–	8	–	0
Rankings from AP small college poll

The 1969 Ball State Cardinals football team was an American football team that represented Ball State University as an independent during the 1969 NCAA College Division football season. In its second season under head coach Wave Myers, the team compiled a 5–5 record. The team played its home games at Ball State Stadium in Muncie, Indiana.

== Schedule ==
Date	Time	Opponent	Site	Result	Attendance	Source
September 13		Buffalo	Ball State Stadium; Muncie, IN	W 10–7	16,112	
September 20		at Eastern Kentucky	Stoll Field; Lexington, KY	L 0–13	11,000	
September 27		Butler	Ball State Stadium; Muncie, IN	W 36–7	5,750	
October 4		at No. 18 Akron	Rubber Bowl; Akron, OH	L 9–49	6,726–6,736	
October 11		Indiana State	Ball State Stadium; Muncie, IN (Blue Key Victory Bell)	L 0–26	16,800	
October 18		at Evansville	Reitz Bowl; Evansville, IN (Band Day)	W 38–0	4,500	
October 25	2:30 p.m.	at Northern Illinois	Huskie Stadium; DeKalb, IL (rivalry)	L 13–17	17,552	
November 1		Middle Tennessee	Ball State Stadium; Muncie, IN	W 14–12	6,550	
November 8		at Southern Illinois	McAndrew Stadium; Carbondale, IL	L 27–48	7,500	
November 15		Eastern Michigan	Ball State Stadium; Muncie, IN	W 31–22	2,000–2,700	
Rankings from small college AP Poll released prior to the game; All times are in Eastern time
