= 1969 Drake Bulldogs football team =

American college football season

1969 Drake Bulldogs football

Pecan Bowl, L 21–29 vs. Arkansas State
- Conference: Independent
- Record: 7–2–2
- Head coach: Jack Wallace (5th season)
- MVP: Duane Miller
- Home stadium: Drake Stadium

1969 NCAA College Division independents football records
	Conf.			Overall
Team	W	L	T	W		L		T
No. 3 Akron		–		9	–	1	–	0
Indiana (PA)		–		8	–	1	–	0
Boston University		–		9	–	2	–	0
No. 9 Tampa		–		8	–	2	–	0
Tennessee State		–		7	–	1	–	1
Colorado College		–		6	–	2	–	0
Drake		–		7	–	2	–	2
Northern Arizona		–		7	–	3	–	0
Illinois College		–		5	–	2	–	1
Mankato State		–		6	–	3	–	0
Hawaii		–		6	–	3	–	1
Indiana State		–		6	–	3	–	1
Ashland		–		5	–	3	–	1
Lincoln (MO)		–		5	–	3	–	1
Portland State		–		6	–	4	–	0
Santa Clara		–		6	–	4	–	0
UNLV		–		6	–	4	–	0
Eastern Michigan		–		5	–	4	–	0
St. Norbert		–		5	–	4	–	0
Cortland		–		4	–	4	–	0
Northern Michigan		–		5	–	5	–	0
Nevada		–		5	–	5	–	0
Rose Poly		–		4	–	4	–	0
Southern Illinois		–		5	–	5	–	0
Wayne State (MI)		–		4	–	4	–	0
Chattanooga		–		4	–	6	–	0
Chicago		–		2	–	4	–	0
Milwaukee		–		3	–	6	–	0
Northeastern		–		3	–	6	–	0
Wabash		–		3	–	6	–	0
Wheaton (IL)		–		3	–	6	–	0
Samford		–		2	–	6	–	1
Lake Forest		–		2	–	6	–	0
Parsons		–		2	–	8	–	0
Kentucky State		–		0	–	8	–	0
Rankings from AP small college poll

The 1969 Drake Bulldogs football team was an American football team that represented Drake University as an independent during the 1969 NCAA College Division football season. In its fifth season under head coach Jack Wallace, the team compiled a 7–2–2 record, outscored opponents by a total of 308 to 236, and lost to Arkansas State in the Pecan Bowl.

The team's statistical leaders included sophomore quarterback Mike Grejbowski (1,916 passing yards), sophomore tailback Scott Sharpe (458 rushing yards), and senior split end Duane Miller (73 receptions for 1,393 yards). Miller was selected as the team's most valuable player.

The team played its home games at Drake Stadium in Des Moines, Iowa.

== Schedule ==
Date	Opponent	Site	Result	Attendance	Source
September 13	Louisville	Drake Stadium; Des Moines, IA	T 24–24	8,500	
September 20	at South Dakota State	Brookings, SD	W 21–16	7,000	
October 4	North Texas State	Drake Stadium; Des Moines, IA	W 27–23	12,500-15,000	
October 11	Northern Iowa	Drake Stadium; Des Moines, IA	L 13–23	9,000	
October 18	at Nebraska–Omaha	Omaha, NE	W 31–21	2,158	
October 25	Western Illinois	Drake Stadium; Des Moines, IA	W 44–7	14,500	
November 1	at South Dakota	Inman Field; Vermillion, SD	W 29–24	3,500	
November 8	at Arkansas State	Kays Stadium; Jonesboro, AR	T 21–21	9,800	
November 15	at Southern Illinois	McAndrew Stadium; Carbondale, IL	W 19–17	3,000	
November 22	at Idaho State	Spud Bowl; Pocatello, ID	W 58–30	5,000	
December 13	vs. Arkansas State	Memorial Stadium; Arlington, TX (Pecan Bowl)	L 21–29	7,500	
