= 1969 Milwaukee Panthers football team =

American college football season

1969 Milwaukee Panthers football
- Conference: Independent
- Record: 3–6
- Head coach: Wally Dreyer (10th season)
- Home stadium: Milwaukee County Stadium; Whitefish Bay Stadium

1969 NCAA College Division independents football records
	Conf.			Overall
Team	W	L	T	W		L		T
No. 3 Akron		–		9	–	1	–	0
Indiana (PA)		–		8	–	1	–	0
Boston University		–		9	–	2	–	0
No. 9 Tampa		–		8	–	2	–	0
Tennessee State		–		7	–	1	–	1
Colorado College		–		6	–	2	–	0
Drake		–		7	–	2	–	2
Northern Arizona		–		7	–	3	–	0
Illinois College		–		5	–	2	–	1
Mankato State		–		6	–	3	–	0
Hawaii		–		6	–	3	–	1
Indiana State		–		6	–	3	–	1
Ashland		–		5	–	3	–	1
Lincoln (MO)		–		5	–	3	–	1
Portland State		–		6	–	4	–	0
Santa Clara		–		6	–	4	–	0
UNLV		–		6	–	4	–	0
Eastern Michigan		–		5	–	4	–	0
St. Norbert		–		5	–	4	–	0
Cortland		–		4	–	4	–	0
Northern Michigan		–		5	–	5	–	0
Nevada		–		5	–	5	–	0
Rose Poly		–		4	–	4	–	0
Southern Illinois		–		5	–	5	–	0
Wayne State (MI)		–		4	–	4	–	0
Chattanooga		–		4	–	6	–	0
Chicago		–		2	–	4	–	0
Milwaukee		–		3	–	6	–	0
Northeastern		–		3	–	6	–	0
Wabash		–		3	–	6	–	0
Wheaton (IL)		–		3	–	6	–	0
Samford		–		2	–	6	–	1
Lake Forest		–		2	–	6	–	0
Parsons		–		2	–	8	–	0
Kentucky State		–		0	–	8	–	0
Rankings from AP small college poll

The 1969 Milwaukee Panthers football team represented the University of Wisconsin–Milwaukee as an independent during the 1969 NCAA College Division football season. Led by Wally Dreyer in his tenth season as head coach, Milwaukee compiled a record of 3–6. The Panthers offense scored 83 points while the defense allowed 269 points.

== Schedule ==
Date	Opponent	Site	Result	Attendance	Source
September 13	at Illinois State	Hancock Stadium; Normal, IL	L 14–44	14,000	
September 20	Eastern Illinois	Milwaukee County Stadium; Milwaukee, WI	W 21–20	3,500	
September 27	at Central Michigan	Alumni Field; Mount Pleasant, MI	L 6–41	9,000	
October 4	at Western Illinois	Hanson Field; Macomb, IL	L 0–41	10,000	
October 11	Ferris State	Whitefish Bay Stadium; Whitefish Bay, WI	L 0–9	2,500	
October 18	at Chicago Circle	Soldier Field; Chicago, IL	W 15–13	3,500	
October 25	Quantico Marines	Shorewood Stadium; Shorewood, WI	L 3–43	3,000	
November 1	at St. Norbert	Minahan Stadium; De Pere, WI	L 7–48	3,000	
November 8	Bradley	Milwaukee County Stadium; Milwaukee, WI	W 17–10	4,000	
