= 1970 Denver Broncos season =

American football team season

- Owner: Gerald Phipps
- General manager: Lou Saban
- Head coach: Lou Saban
- Home stadium: Mile High Stadium

Results
- Record: 5–8–1
- Division place: 4th AFC West
- Playoffs: Did not qualify

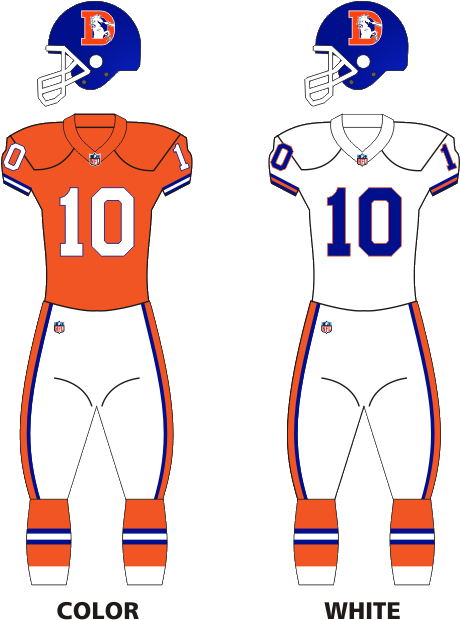
Uniforms worn by the NFL franchise Denver Broncos from 1968 to 1996.

The 1970 Denver Broncos season was the team's 11th season in professional football and first in the National Football League (NFL) after the merger. Led by fourth-year head coach and general manager Lou Saban, the Broncos posted a record of five wins, eight losses, and one tie, the same as the previous season, and were last in the new four-team AFC West division.

Denver won four of its first five games, but then had only one win and one tie in the final nine games. Running back Floyd Little became the first player to lead his conference in rushing for a last place team.

== Offseason ==
=== NFL draft ===
1970 Denver Broncos draft
Round	Pick	Player	Position	College	Notes
1	11	Bobby Anderson	RB	Colorado	
2	37	Alden Roche	DE	Southern	
3	63	John Kohler	OT	South Dakota	
4	89	Jerry Hendren	WR	Idaho	
5	115	Bill McKoy	LB	Purdue	
6	141	John Mosier	TE	Kansas	
7	167	Randy Montgomery	CB	Weber State	
8	208	Louis Porter	RB	Southern	
9	219	Dave Washington *	LB	Alcorn State	
10	245	Maurice Fullerton	DT	Tuskegee	
11	271	Cleve Bryant	QB	Ohio	
12	297	Greg Jones	RB	Wisconsin-Whitewater	
13	323	Jim McKoy	DB	Parsons	
14	349	Jeff Slipp	LB	BYU	
15	375	Maher Barakat	K	South Dakota Tech	
16	401	Bob Stewart	QB	Northern Arizona	
17	427	Frank Kalfoss	K	Montana State	
Made roster † Pro Football Hall of Fame * Made at least one Pro Bowl during career

== Personnel ==
=== Staff / Coaches ===
1970 Denver Broncos staff
Front office: Team Owner / Chairman of the Board – Gerald Phipps; Team President – Allan Phipps; Director of Player Personnel – Fred Gehrke; Director of Scouting – Carroll Hardy; Head coaches: General Manager/Head Coach – Lou Saban; Offensive coaches: Offensive Backfield – Hunter Enis; Receivers – Sam Rutigliano; Offensive Line – Whitey Dovell	Defensive coaches: Defensive Line – Stan Jones; Linebackers – Dick MacPherson; Defensive Backfield – Joe Collier

=== Roster ===
1970 Denver Broncos roster
Quarterbacks (QB): 14 Pete Liske; 12 Alan Pastrana; Running backs (RB): 11 Bobby Anderson; 33 Willis Crenshaw; 44 Floyd Little; 22 Fran Lynch; 35 Clem Turner; 29 Wandy Williams; Wide receivers (WR): 88 Al Denson; 89 John Embree; 84 Mike Haffner; 86 Jerry Hendren; 42 Billy Van Heusen P; Tight ends (TE): 81 Billy Masters; 83 Jim Whalen	Offensive linemen (OL): 68 Steve Alexakos T/G; 72 Sam Brunelli T; 74 Mike Current T; 67 George Goeddeke G; 59 Larry Kaminski C; 64 Mike Schnitker G; 60 Bob Young G; Defensive linemen (DL): 73 Walt Barnes DT; 63 Dave Costa DT; 55 Pete Duranko DE; 62 Jerry Inman DT; 87 Rich Jackson DE; 77 Alden Roche DE; 70 Paul Smith DT	Linebackers (LB): 78 Ken Criter MLB; 50 Carl Cunningham OLB; 52 Fred Forsberg MLB; 58 Bill McKoy OLB; 54 Chip Myrtle OLB; 56 Dave Washington OLB; Defensive backs (DB): 28 Cornell Gordon CB; 20 Charlie Greer SS; 43 Pete Jaquess CB/S; 47 Paul Martha FS; 26 George Saimes FS; 37 Bob Wade CB; Special teams (ST): 3 Bobby Howfield K	Practice squad: 61 George Gaiser T; 49 Alvin Mitchell CB; 85 John Mosier TE; Reserve: 56 Jay Bachman T (IR); 24 Booker Edgerson CB (IR); 23 Drake Garrett CB (IR); 57 John Huard LB (IR); 21 Randy Montgomery (IR); 13 Steve Tensi QB (IR); 36 Bill Thompson CB (IR); Rookies in italics

== Regular season ==
=== Schedule ===
Week	Date	Opponent	Result	Record	Venue	Attendance	Recap
1	September 20	at Buffalo Bills	**W** 25–10	1–0	War Memorial Stadium	34,882	Recap
2	September 27	Pittsburgh Steelers	**W** 16–13	2–0	Mile High Stadium	50,705	Recap
3	October 4	**Kansas City Chiefs**	**W** 26–13	3–0	Mile High Stadium	50,705	Recap
4	October 11	at **Oakland Raiders**	**L** 23–35	3–1	Oakland–Alameda County Coliseum	54,436	Recap
5	October 18	Atlanta Falcons	**W** 24–10	4–1	Mile High Stadium	50,705	Recap
6	October 25	at San Francisco 49ers	**L** 14–19	4–2	Kezar Stadium	39,515	Recap
7	November 1	Washington Redskins	**L** 3–19	4–3	Mile High Stadium	50,705	Recap
8	November 8	at **San Diego Chargers**	**L** 21–24	4–4	San Diego Stadium	48,327	Recap
9	November 15	**Oakland Raiders**	**L** 19–24	4–5	Mile High Stadium	50,959	Recap
10	November 22	at New Orleans Saints	**W** 31–6	5–5	Tulane Stadium	66,837	Recap
11	November 29	at Houston Oilers	**L** 21–31	5–6	Astrodome	35,733	Recap
12	December 6	at **Kansas City Chiefs**	**L** 0–16	5–7	Municipal Stadium	50,454	Recap
13	December 13	**San Diego Chargers**	**T** 17–17	5–7–1	Mile High Stadium	50,959	Recap
14	December 20	Cleveland Browns	**L** 13–27	5–8–1	Mile High Stadium	51,001	Recap
Note: Intra-division opponents are in **bold** text.

=== Game summaries ===
==== Week 6 (Sunday, October 25, 1970): at San Francisco 49ers ====
Week 6: Denver Broncos at San Francisco 49ers – Game summary

Quarter	1	2	3	4	Total
Broncos (4–2)	7	7	0	0	**14**
**49ers** (4–1–1)	3	3	10	3	**19**

at Kezar Stadium • San Francisco, California

- Date: October 25
- Game time: 2:00 p.m. MST
- Game attendance: 39,515
- Referee: Jack Reader
- TV announcers (NBC): Jay Randolph (play–by–play) and Gordie Soltau (color commentator)

Team	Category	Player	Statistics
DEN	Passing		
DEN	Rushing		
DEN	Receiving		
SF	Passing		
SF	Rushing		
SF	Receiving		

Scoring summary

Quarter	Time	Drive			Team	Scoring information	Score	
Quarter	Time	Plays	Yards	TOP	Team	Scoring information	DEN	SF
"TOP" = time of possession. For other American football terms, see Glossary of American football.							14	19

- Point spread: Broncos +6½
- Time of game: 2 hours, 46 minutes

Broncos	Game statistics	49ers
15	First downs	16
33–162	Rushes–yards	34–128
134	Passing yards	234
12–27–3	Passes	16–35–0
2–13	Sacked–yards	0–0
121	Net passing yards	234
283	Total yards	362
88	Return yards	71
8–40.6	Punts	7–39.3
0–0	Fumbles–lost	1–0
5–50	Penalties–yards	9–87
	Time of possession	

Individual stats

=== Standings ===
AFC West
	W	L	T	PCT	DIV	CONF	PF	PA	STK
Oakland Raiders	8	4	2	.667	4-0-2	7-2-2	300	293	L1
Kansas City Chiefs	7	5	2	.583	2–3–1	7–3–1	272	244	L2
San Diego Chargers	5	6	3	.455	2–2–2	4–4–3	282	278	W1
Denver Broncos	5	8	1	.385	1–4–1	3–6–1	253	264	L1

Note: Tie games were not officially counted in the standings until 1972.

== Awards and honors ==
- Floyd Little, AFC Rushing champion
