= List of Middle Tennessee Blue Raiders head football coaches =

List of head football coaches for the Middle Tennessee Blue Raiders

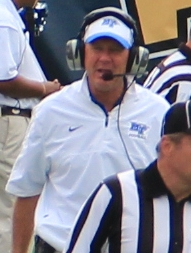
Rick Stockstill served as head coach of the Blue Raiders from 2006 to 2023.

The Middle Tennessee Blue Raiders college football team represents Middle Tennessee State University in Conference USA (C-USA), as part of the NCAA Division I Football Bowl Subdivision. The program has had 16 head coaches since it began play during the 1911 season. Since December 2023, Derek Mason has served as head coach at Middle Tennessee.

Three coaches have led Middle Tennessee in postseason playoff or bowl games: Charles M. Murphy, Boots Donnelly, and Rick Stockstill. Five coaches have won conference championships: Johnny Floyd won two as a member of the Southern Intercollegiate Athletic Association; Charles M. Murphy won nine as a member of the Volunteer State Athletic Conference; Murphy won seven and Boots Donnelly won four as a member of the Ohio Valley Conference; and Andy McCollum and Stockstill each won one as a member of the Sun Belt Conference.

Murphy is the leader in seasons coached, with 22 years as head coach and in games coached (226) and won (155). Johnny Floyd has the highest winning percentage at 0.782. Donald E. Fuoss has the lowest winning percentage of those who have coached more than one game, with 0.100. Of the 16 different head coaches who have led the Blue Raiders, Donnelly has been inducted into the College Football Hall of Fame.

== Key ==
Key to symbols in coaches list
General		Overall		Conference		Postseason (Note: Although the first Rose Bowl Game was played in 1902, it has been continuously played since the 1916 game, and is recognized as the oldest bowl game by the NCAA. "—" indicates any season prior to 1916 when postseason games were not played.)	
No.	Order of coaches (Note: A running total of the number of head coaches, with coaches who served separate tenures being counted only once. Interim head coaches are represented with "Int" and are not counted in the running total. "—" indicates the team played but either without a coach or no coach is on record. "X" indicates an interim year without play.)	GC	Games coached	CW	Conference wins	PW	Postseason wins
DC	Division championships	OW	Overall wins	CL	Conference losses	PL	Postseason losses
CC	Conference championships	OL	Overall losses	CT	Conference ties	PT	Postseason ties
NC	National championships	OT	Overall ties (Note: Overtime rules in college football were introduced in 1996, making ties impossible in the period since.)	C%	Conference winning percentage		
†	Elected to the College Football Hall of Fame	O%	Overall winning percentage (Note: When computing the win–loss percentage, a tie counts as half a win and half a loss.)				

== Coaches ==
List of head football coaches showing season(s) coached, overall records, conference records, postseason records, championships and selected awards (Note: Statistics correct as of the end of the 2025 NCAA Division I FCS football season.)
No.	Name	Years(s) (Note: Middle Tennessee did not field a team for their 1918 and 1943–1945 seasons.)	Seasons	GC	OW	OL	OT	O%	CW	CL	CT	C%	PW	PL	PT	DC	CC	NC	Awards
1	L. T. "Mutt" Weber	1911–1912	2	2	1	1	0	0.500	—	—	—	—	—	—	—	—	—	0	—
2	Alfred B. Miles	1913–1916; 1919–1923	4, 5	54	36	14	4	0.704	—	—	—	—	—	—	—	—	—	0	—
3	Johnny Floyd	1917; 1935–1938	4	39	30	8	1	0.782	12	6	1	0.658	—	—	—	—	2	0	—
4	Guy Stephenson	1924–1925	2	17	4	11	2	0.294	—	—	—	—	—	—	—	—	—	0	—
5	Frank Faulkinberry	1926–1932	7	63	33	26	4	0.556	2	3	0	0.400	—	—	—	—	0	0	—
6	E. M. Waller	1933–1934	2	18	3	14	1	0.194	1	7	0	0.125	—	—	—	—	0	0	—
7	Ernest Alley	1939	1	8	1	6	1	0.188	1	5	1	0.214	—	—	—	—	0	0	—
8	Elwin W. Midgett	1940–1942; 1946	3, 1	32	18	11	3	0.609	4	7	1	0.375	—	—	—	—	0	0	—
9	Charles M. Murphy	1947–1968	22	226	155	63	8	0.704	90	19	1	0.823	2	2	0	—	16	0	OVC Coach of the Year (1965)
10	Donald E. Fuoss	1969	1	10	1	9	0	0.100	1	6	0	0.143	0	0	0	—	0	0	—
11	Bill Peck	1970–1974	5	54	27	25	2	0.519	17	16	2	0.514	0	0	0	—	0	0	—
12	Ben Hurt	1975–1978	4	44	12	31	1	0.284	8	19	0	0.296	0	0	0	—	0	0	—
13	Boots Donnelly^{†}	1979–1998	20	214	133	80	1	0.624	93	48	0	0.660	7	7	0	—	4	0	OVC Coach of the Year (1977, 1983, 1985, 1989)
14	Andy McCollum	1999–2005	7	79	34	45	—	0.430	17	16	—	0.515	0	0	—	—	1	0	—
15	Rick Stockstill	2006–2023	18	224	113	111	—	0.504	82	58	—	0.586	4	6	—	1	1	0	Sun Belt Coach of the Year (2006, 2009); C-USA Coach of the Year (2018)
16	Derek Mason	2024–present	2	24	6	18	—	0.250	4	12	—	0.250	0	0	—	—	0	0	—
