= Jerry Hendren =

American football player (1947–2018)

No. 86
- Position: Wide receiver

Personal information
- Born: November 4, 1947; Spokane, Washington, U.S.
- Died: February 26, 2018 (aged 70)
- Listed height: 6 ft 2 in (1.88 m)
- Listed weight: 187 lb (85 kg)

Career information
- High school: Shadle Park (Spokane, Washington)
- College: Idaho
- NFL draft: 1970: 4th round, 89th overall pick

Career history
- Denver Broncos (1970)

Awards and highlights
- NCAA receiving leader (1969)
- Stats at Pro Football Reference

Jerome Wayne "Jerry" Hendren (November 4, 1947 – February 26, 2018) was an American football player, a wide receiver who played one season in the National Football League (NFL), with the Denver Broncos in 1970.

== Early life ==
Born and raised in Spokane, Washington, Hendren graduated from Shadle Park High School in 1966, and played college football at the University of Idaho in Moscow. He led the NCAA in 1969 in both receptions (95) and receiving yards (1,452). Hendren also led the nation in 1968 in receptions (86) and receiving touchdowns (14). He was recruited to Idaho under head coach Steve Musseau; Y C McNease took over in 1968 and emphasized the passing game.

After the 1969 season, Hendren played in five collegiate all-star games, including the East–West Shrine Game, the American Bowl, the Senior Bowl, and the College All-Star Game in late July. He caught five passes in the Shrine Game, ten in the Senior Bowl, and the city of Moscow honored him with "Jerry Hendren Day" and a key to the city.

== Denver Broncos ==
Selected 89th overall in the fourth round of the 1970 NFL draft, Hendren was signed by the Broncos in March 1970, and he appeared in ten games for the Broncos in 1970, principally on special teams, with eight kick returns for 197 yards. Shoulder injuries during his second training camp in 1971 resulted in his retirement.

== After football ==
After his pro football career, Hendren coached briefly, then had a long career in law enforcement; his father Wayne was a police officer in Spokane and was the city's chief of police for a decade (1970−80). Hendren worked for the Spokane County sheriff’s department for 29 years: eleven years as a patrol deputy, seven years as an undercover officer, and eleven years as an investigator. His son Thomas is a captain in the Spokane Police Department.

In 2013, Hendren was selected by the Big Sky Conference 42nd on the conference's list of "50 Greatest Male Athletes". He was a charter member of the University of Idaho Athletics Hall of Fame in 2007.

Hendren died at age 70 in 2018.

== See also ==
- List of college football yearly receiving leaders
