= 1969 Maine Black Bears football team =

American college football season

1969 Maine Black Bears football
- Conference: Yankee Conference
- Record: 5–4 (3–2 Yankee)
- Head coach: Walter Abbott (3rd season)
- Captain: Paul Dulac
- Home stadium: Alumni Field

1969 Yankee Conference football standings
	Conf.					Overall
Team	W		L		T	W		L		T
UMass $	5	–	0	–	0	6	–	3	–	0
Connecticut	3	–	2	–	0	5	–	4	–	0
Maine	3	–	2	–	0	5	–	4	–	0
Vermont	2	–	3	–	0	3	–	6	–	0
New Hampshire	1	–	4	–	0	3	–	5	–	0
Rhode Island	1	–	4	–	0	2	–	7	–	0
$ – Conference champion

The 1969 Maine Black Bears football team was an American football team that represented the University of Maine as a member of the Yankee Conference during the 1969 NCAA College Division football season. In its third season under head coach Walter Abbott, the team compiled a 5–4 record (3–2 against conference opponents) and tied for second out of six teams in the Yankee Conference. Paul Dulac was the team captain.

== Schedule ==
Date	Opponent	Site	Result	Attendance	Source
September 20	UMass	Alumni Field; Orono, ME	L 7–49	8,302–8,500	
September 27	Southern Connecticut State*	Alumni Field; Orono, ME	W 21–14	2,806–3,400	
October 4	at Rhode Island	Meade Stadium; Kingston, RI	W 35–7	11,100	
October 11	New Hampshire	Alumni Field; Orono, ME	W 20–18	5,839–6,300	
October 18	Connecticut	Alumni Field; Orono, ME	L 7–28	9,500–9,561	
October 25	at Boston University*	Nickerson Field; Boston, MA	L 7–20	5,500–8,000	
November 1	Hofstra*	Alumni Field; Orono, ME	W 40–34	4,300–5,500	
November 8	at The Citadel*	Johnson Hagood Stadium; Charleston, SC	L 28–40	12,500–15,000	
November 15	at Vermont	Centennial Field; Burlington, VT	W 38–30	5,500	
*Non-conference game

== After the season ==
The following Black Bear was selected in the 1970 NFL draft after the season.

Round	Pick	Player	Position	NFL club
11	281	Gene Benner	Wide receiver	Cleveland Browns
