= 1968 Middle Tennessee Blue Raiders football team =

American college football season

1968 Middle Tennessee Blue Raiders football
- Conference: Ohio Valley Conference
- Record: 2–8 (1–6 OVC)
- Head coach: Charles M. Murphy (22nd season)
- Captains: Daniel; Mathews; Claxton
- Home stadium: Horace Jones Field

1968 Ohio Valley Conference football standings
	Conf.					Overall
Team	W		L		T	W		L		T
No. 9/8 Eastern Kentucky $	7	–	0	–	0	8	–	2	–	0
No. 19/17 Western Kentucky	5	–	2	–	0	7	–	2	–	1
Murray State	5	–	2	–	0	7	–	2	–	1
East Tennessee State	4	–	3	–	0	5	–	5	–	0
Austin Peay	3	–	4	–	0	5	–	5	–	0
Tennessee Tech	2	–	5	–	0	2	–	8	–	0
Morehead State	1	–	6	–	0	3	–	6	–	1
Middle Tennessee	1	–	6	–	0	2	–	8	–	0
$ – Conference champion; Rankings from AP/UPI small college polls

The 1968 Middle Tennessee Blue Raiders football team represented Middle Tennessee State University—as a member of the Ohio Valley Conference (OVC) during the 1968 NCAA College Division football season. Led by 22nd-year head coach Charles M. Murphy, the Blue Raiders compiled a record an overall record of 2–8 with a mark of 1–6 in conference play, tying for seventh place in the OVC. The team's captains were Daniel, Mathews, and Claxton.

== Schedule ==
Date	Opponent	Site	Result	Attendance	Source
September 21	Pensacola Navy*	Horace Jones Field; Murfreesboro, TN	L 7–12	9,000	
September 28	Morehead State	Horace Jones Field; Murfreesboro, TN	W 28–18	7,000	
October 5	at Chattanooga*	Chamberlain Field; Chattanooga, TN	L 15–28	11,500	
October 12	at No. 3 Eastern Kentucky	Richmond, KY	L 21–49	10,000	
October 19	at Murray State	Cutchin Stadium; Murray, KY	L 13–35	8,500	
October 26	Austin Peay	Horace Jones Field; Murfreesboro, TN	L 13–46	9,000	
November 2	Tennessee–Martin*	Horace Jones Field; Murfreesboro, TN	W 24–17	9,500	
November 9	at No. 9 Western Kentucky	L. T. Smith Stadium; Bowling Green, KY (rivalry)	L 2–43	7,493–8,500	
November 16	East Tennessee State	Horace Jones Field; Murfreesboro, TN	L 21–24	5,000	
November 28	at Tennessee Tech	Tucker Stadium; Cookeville, TN	L 3–7	8,000	
*Non-conference game; Rankings from AP Poll released prior to the game
