= 1969 Idaho Vandals football team =

American college football season

1969 Idaho Vandals football
- Conference: Big Sky Conference
- Record: 2–8 (1–3 Big Sky)
- Head coach: Y C McNease (2nd season)
- Offensive coordinator: Bobby Thompson (1st season)
- Defensive coordinator: Don Robbins
- Captains: Wayne Marquess; Tom Nelson
- Home stadium: Rogers Field

1969 Big Sky Conference football standings
	Conf.					Overall
Team	W		L		T	W		L		T
Montana $	4	–	0	–	0	10	–	1	–	0
Weber State	3	–	1	–	0	6	–	4	–	0
Idaho State	2	–	2	–	0	5	–	5	–	0
Idaho	1	–	3	–	0	2	–	8	–	0
Montana State	0	–	4	–	0	1	–	8	–	0
$ – Conference champion

The 1969 Idaho Vandals football team represented the University of Idaho in the 1969 NCAA University Division football season. The Vandals were led by second-year head coach Y C McNease and played in the Big Sky Conference. After two seasons in the College Division, Idaho returned to the University Division this year.

Due to soil erosion, the wooden grandstands at 32-year-old Neale Stadium in Moscow were deemed unsafe in early August. Without a usable stadium on campus, they played their three home games at Rogers Field at Washington State University in nearby Pullman, Washington.

Despite playing their home games in Pullman, the Vandals did not play the Washington State Cougars in the Battle of the Palouse. Outside of war years, it was the first break in the rivalry since 1900. Washington State had to adjust its schedules to include all seven conference foes; the rivalry resumed in 1970 but was skipped again in 1971.

In their ninth meeting with Idaho State, the Vandals incurred their first loss to the Bengals in the home opener in Pullman. Without a game in Boise on the schedule (first time since 1946), the Vandals did not play in the state of Idaho this season; this occurred again thirty years later in 1999.

Idaho had four starting quarterbacks in 1969: Steve Olson was first-string, backed up by John Hathaway, both from Lewiston. Hampered by back problems, Olson started the first four and Hathaway the next four, until a shoulder injury. Mitch Lansdell started the ninth game but an ankle injury sidelined him late in the fourth quarter. Fourth-string Pete Glindeman was slated to redshirt and had been lining up in practices as a defensive end. He relieved Lansdell and started the last game, a ten-point loss in which he completed 27 passes on 54 attempts for 371 yards, but threw seven interceptions.

A day after the season ended, the south grandstand of idle Neale Stadium was burned in an apparent arson. Less than five months later, a similar fire occurred at Rogers Field in April 1970. Also a suspected arson, it severely damaged the south grandstand and press box of the wooden venue.

== Schedule ==
Date	Time	Opponent	Site	Result	Attendance	Source
September 20	5:30 pm	at Northern Illinois*	Huskie Stadium; DeKalb, IL	L 30–47	15,912–16,000	
September 27	1:30 pm	Idaho State	Rogers Field; Pullman, WA (rivalry)	L 42–47		
October 3	5:30 pm	vs. Southern Miss*	Ladd Memorial Stadium; Mobile, AL	W 31–21	7,132	
October 11	12:30 pm	at No. 4 Montana	Dornblaser Field; Missoula, MT (Little Brown Stein)	L 9–34	9,500	
October 18	2:00 pm	at Pacific (CA)*	Pacific Memorial Stadium; Stockton, CA	L 0–28	16,142–16,500	
October 25	1:30 pm	Montana State^{†}	Rogers Field; Pullman, WA	W 31–21	10,452	
November 1	1:30 pm	at Oregon*	Autzen Stadium; Eugene, OR	L 14–58	20,500	
November 8	12:30 pm	at Weber State	Wildcat Stadium; Ogden, IT	L 7–28	9,395	
November 15	12:30 pm	at Colorado State*	Hughes Stadium; Fort Collins, CO	L 21–31	13,693	
November 22	12:30 pm	Utah State*	Rogers Field; Pullman, WA	L 21–31	5,621	
*Non-conference game; ^{†}Homecoming; Rankings from AP Poll released prior to the game; All times are in Pacific time

== Roster ==
1969 Idaho Vandals football team roster
Players
Coaches
Offense

Pos.	#	Name	Class
QB	11	Steve Olson	Jr
QB	12	John Hathaway	So
QB	14	Mitch Lansdell	Jr
QB, DE	18	Pete Glindeman	So
WR	25	Terry Moreland	So
WR	37	Don Almquist
RB	21	Henry Boomer	So
RB, P	22	Ron Davis	Jr
RB	31	Mike Wiscombe	Jr
RB	42	Frank Doctor	So
RB	44	Jeff Guillory	Sr
RB	45	Jim Wilund	So
C	51	John Durham	Jr
OL	52	Gordon De Waard	Sr
LG	62	Tom Nelson (C)	Sr
OL	63	Pat Flynn	Jr
RG	65	Bill Cady	So
OL	68	Jim Wimer	Jr
OL	70	Richard Beaver	So
OL	71	Daryl Hanauer	So
OL	74	Bruce Langmade	Jr
OL	75	Rich Kushlan	So
RT	77	Bob Haney	Sr
LT	78	Andy Kupp	So
TE	82	Mike Dempsey	Sr
TE	83	Mike Sizelove	Jr
WR	84	Jerry Hendren	Sr
WR	86	Bob Miller
WR	89	Jack Goddard	Jr

Defense

Pos.	#	Name	Class
CB, WR	10	Jim Wickboldt	Sr
LB, DB	16	Wayne Marquess (C)	Sr
DB	20	Doug Clark	Sr
DB	23	Steve Brown	Jr
SS	24	Bob Juba	Sr
DB	26	Steve Holdren	So
CB	27	Pat Sprute	So
LB	34	Bill "Bubba" Bain	So
DB	35	Dale Yount	Jr
LB	38	Jesse Craig	Jr
FS	40	George Smith	Sr
LB	43	Jim Boyles	So
LB	50	Roosevelt Owens	Sr
LB	55	Joe Tasby	Sr
DL	60	Tom Carson	Sr
LB	61	Ron Linehan	So
DT	66	Ed Clauson	Sr
LB	67	Steve Barker	So
DT	69	Brock Jackley	Jr
DL	73	Faustin Riley	So
DL	79	Roger Oestmann	So
DL	80	John Knowles	Sr
DE	81	Tom Jarman	So
DL	85	Kurt Miller	Sr
DE	88	Tim Reese	Jr

Special teams

Pos.	#	Name	Class
PK	36	Ricardo Castillo	So

Head coach

- Y C McNease (2nd year)

Coordinators/assistant coaches

- Don Robbins (DC/DL)
- Ed Troxel (OL)

Legend

- (C) Team captain
- (S) Suspended
- (I) Ineligible
- Injured
- Redshirt

== All-conference ==
Wide receiver Jerry Hendren was a repeat selection to the all-conference team, again unanimously. He was joined by linebackers Roosevelt Owens and Ron Linehan, the lone sophomore.

== NFL draft ==
Three Vandals were selected in the 1970 NFL draft, which lasted 17 rounds (442 selections).

Player	Position	Round	Overall	Franchise
Jerry Hendren	WR	4th	89	Denver Broncos
Bob Haney	T	15th	383	Detroit Lions
Mike Sizelove	TE	17th	424	Philadelphia Eagles
