= John Robert Bell =

American football coach and athletics administrator

Biographical details
- Born: June 12, 1922; Clinchport, Virginia, U.S.
- Died: December 25, 2008 (aged 86); Johnson City, Tennessee, U.S.
- Education: Georgia Tech, ETSU

Coaching career (HC unless noted)

Football
- 1953–1956: Georgia Tech (line)
- 1957: Southwestern Louisiana
- 1958–1965: Georgia Tech (line)
- 1966–1972: East Tennessee State

Women's basketball
- 1972–1973: East Tennessee State

Administrative career (AD unless noted)
- 1957–1958: Southwestern Louisiana
- 1966–1973: East Tennessee State

Head coaching record
- Overall: 35–39–6
- Bowls: 1–0

Accomplishments and honors

Championships
- 1 OVC (1969)

Awards
- OVC Coach of the Year (1969)

John Robert Bell (June 12, 1922 – December 25, 2008) was an American college football coach and athletics administrator. He served as the head football coach at Southwestern Louisiana Institute of Liberal and Technical Learning—now known as the University of Louisiana at Lafayette–in 1957 and at East Tennessee State University from 1966 to 1972. In 1972–73, he also served as head coach of the East Tennessee State Buccaneers women's basketball team.

== Head coaching record ==
Year	Team	Overall	Conference	Standing	Bowl/playoffs	AP^{#}	UPI^{°}
Southwestern Louisiana Bulldogs (Gulf States Conference) (1957)
1957	Southwestern Louisiana	4–5–1	1–3–1	T–4th			
Southwestern Louisiana:		4–5–1	1–3–1				
East Tennessee State Buccaneers (Ohio Valley Conference) (1966–1972)
1966	East Tennessee State	3–6	2–5	7th			
1967	East Tennessee State	3–6–1	3–4	T–4th			
1968	East Tennessee State	5–5	4–3	4th			
1969	East Tennessee State	10–0–1	6–0–1	1st	W Grantland Rice	20	16
1970	East Tennessee State	7–1–2	4–1–2	T–2nd			
1971	East Tennessee State	0–9–1	0–6–1	8th			
1972	East Tennessee State	3–7	2–5	T–6th			
East Tennessee State:		31–34–5	21–24–4				
Total:		35–39–6					
National championship Conference title Conference division title or championship game berth
