= 1968 Western Kentucky Hilltoppers football team =

American college football season

1968 Western Kentucky Hilltoppers football
- Conference: Ohio Valley Conference
- Record: 7–2–1 (5–2 OVC)
- Head coach: Jimmy Feix (1st season)
- Captain: Walt Heath
- Home stadium: L. T. Smith Stadium

1968 Ohio Valley Conference football standings
	Conf.					Overall
Team	W		L		T	W		L		T
No. 9/8 Eastern Kentucky $	7	–	0	–	0	8	–	2	–	0
No. 19/17 Western Kentucky	5	–	2	–	0	7	–	2	–	1
Murray State	5	–	2	–	0	7	–	2	–	1
East Tennessee State	4	–	3	–	0	5	–	5	–	0
Austin Peay	3	–	4	–	0	5	–	5	–	0
Tennessee Tech	2	–	5	–	0	2	–	8	–	0
Morehead State	1	–	6	–	0	3	–	6	–	1
Middle Tennessee	1	–	6	–	0	2	–	8	–	0
$ – Conference champion; Rankings from AP/UPI small college polls

The 1968 Western Kentucky football team represented Western Kentucky University during the 1968 NCAA College Division football season. The team was led by coach Jimmy Feix, in his first season as coach, the Hilltoppers compiled an overall record of 7–2–1 with a mark of 5–2 in conference play, placing second in the OVC. The team's captain was Walt Heath.

== Schedule ==
Date	Opponent	Rank	Site	Result	Attendance	Source
September 21	Butler*		L. T. Smith Stadium; Bowling Green, KY	W 35–0	10,866–15,000	
September 28	Austin Peay	No. 14	L. T. Smith Stadium; Bowling Green, KY	W 42–0	8,997–12,000	
October 5	at East Tennessee State	No. 16	Johnson City, TN	W 23–0	6,500	
October 12	at Western Illinois*	No. 10	Hanson Field; Macomb, IL	W 66–0	5,000–6,000	
October 19	at Tennessee Tech	No. 4	Cookeville, TN	W 13–0	6,000–6,500	
October 26	No. 11 Eastern Kentucky^{†}	No. 3	L. T. Smith Stadium; Bowling Green, KY (Battle of the Bluegrass)	L 7–16	20,000–20,428	
November 2	at Morehead State	No. 10	Jayne Stadium; Morehead, KY	W 24–21	6,500	
November 9	Middle Tennessee	No. 9	L. T. Smith Stadium; Bowling Green, KY (100 Miles of Hate)	W 43–2	7,493–8,500	
November 16	No. 15 Akron*	No. 8	L. T. Smith Stadium; Bowling Green, KY	T 14–14	7,335–9,000	
November 23	at Murray State	No. 9	Cutchin Stadium; Murray, KY (rivalry)	L 14–17	8,500–9,500	
*Non-conference game; ^{†}Homecoming; Rankings from AP Poll released prior to the game
