= 1969 Montana Grizzlies football team =

American college football season

1969 Montana Grizzlies football

Big Sky champion

Camellia Bowl, L 3–30 vs. North Dakota State
- Conference: Big Sky Conference

Ranking
- Coaches: No. 2
- AP: No. 2
- Record: 10–1 (4–0 Big Sky)
- Head coach: Jack Swarthout (3rd season)
- Captains: Tuufuli Uperesa; Ray Brum; Jim Nordstrom
- Home stadium: Dornblaser Field

1969 Big Sky Conference football standings
	Conf.					Overall
Team	W		L		T	W		L		T
Montana $	4	–	0	–	0	10	–	1	–	0
Weber State	3	–	1	–	0	6	–	4	–	0
Idaho State	2	–	2	–	0	5	–	5	–	0
Idaho	1	–	3	–	0	2	–	8	–	0
Montana State	0	–	4	–	0	1	–	8	–	0
$ – Conference champion

The 1969 Montana Grizzlies football team represented the University of Montana in the 1969 NCAA College Division football season as a member of the Big Sky Conference (Big Sky). The Grizzlies were led by third-year head coach Jack Swarthout and played their home games at Dornblaser Field.

In a significant turnaround from the previous year, Montana won all ten games in the regular season (4–0 Big Sky, champions). They met undefeated North Dakota State in the Camellia Bowl in Sacramento in December, but lost 30–3. Released prior to the game, both final polls had NDSU first and Montana second.

== Schedule ==
Date	Time	Opponent	Rank	Site	Result	Attendance	Source
September 13	12:30 pm	at North Dakota*		Memorial Stadium; Grand Forks, ND	W 24–10	8,000–10,000	
September 20	8:00 pm	South Dakota*		Memorial Stadium; Great Falls, MT	W 31–20	5,000	
September 27	1:30 pm	No. 4 Northern Arizona*		Dornblaser Field; Missoula, MT	W 52–7	10,500	
October 4	8:00 pm	at Weber State	No. 9	Wildcat Stadium; Ogden, UT	W 20–17	11,043–11,843	
October 11	1:30 pm	Idaho	No. 4	Dornblaser Field; Missoula, MT (Little Brown Stein)	W 34–9	9,000–9,500	
October 18	1:30 pm	No. 20 Idaho State^{†}	No. 4	Dornblaser Field; Missoula, MT	W 46–36	9,800–11,500	
October 25	2:30 pm	at Portland State*	No. 2	Civic Stadium; Portland, OR	W 49–14	13,814	
November 1	1:30 pm	at Montana State	No. 3	Gatton Field; Bozeman, MT (rivalry)	W 7–6	9,100–10,000	
November 8	1:30 pm	Cal Poly*	No. 2	Dornblaser Field; Missoula, MT	W 14–0	7,500–9,000	
November 15	1:30 pm	South Dakota State*	No. 2	Dornblaser Field; Missoula, MT	W 58–0	8,500	
December 13		vs. No. 1 North Dakota State*	No. 2	Charles C. Hughes Stadium; Sacramento, CA (Camellia Bowl)	L 3–30	14,900	
*Non-conference game; ^{†}Homecoming; Rankings from AP Poll released prior to the game; All times are in Mountain time

== Coaching staff ==
- Jack Elway (AHC, DB)
- Bill Betcher (OL)
- Wally Brown (DL)
- Ron Nord (LB, E)
