= 1969 Montana State Bobcats football team =

American college football season

1969 Montana State Bobcats football
- Conference: Big Sky Conference
- Record: 1–8 (0–4 Big Sky)
- Head coach: Tom Parac (2nd season)
- Home stadium: Gatton Field

1969 Big Sky Conference football standings
| | Conf. | | | | | Overall |
| Team | W | | L | | T | W | | L | | T |
|---|---|---|---|---|---|---|---|---|---|---|
| Montana $ | 4 | – | 0 | – | 0 | 10 | – | 1 | – | 0 |
| Weber State | 3 | – | 1 | – | 0 | 6 | – | 4 | – | 0 |
| Idaho State | 2 | – | 2 | – | 0 | 5 | – | 5 | – | 0 |
| Idaho | 1 | – | 3 | – | 0 | 2 | – | 8 | – | 0 |
| Montana State | 0 | – | 4 | – | 0 | 1 | – | 8 | – | 0 |
$ – Conference champion

The 1969 Montana State Bobcats football team was an American football team that represented Montana State University in the Big Sky Conference during the 1969 NCAA College Division football season. In their second season under head coach Tom Parac, the Bobcats compiled a 1–8 record (0–4 against Big Sky opponents) and finished last out of five teams in the Big Sky.

== Schedule ==
| Date | Opponent | Rank | Site | Result | Attendance | Source |
|---|---|---|---|---|---|---|
| September 13 | vs. Portland State* | | Daylis Stadium; Billings, MT | L 6–22 | 6,500 | |
| September 20 | North Dakota* | | Gatton Field; Bozeman, MT | W 36–16 | 3,000–4,500 | |
| September 27 | Fresno State* | No. 17 | Gatton Field; Bozeman, MT | L 20–28 | 7,500 | |
| October 4 | at No. 8 Northern Arizona* | | Lumberjack Stadium; Flagstaff, AZ | L 0–35 | 7,900–8,000 | |
| October 11 | at Idaho State | | Spud Bowl; Pocatello, ID | L 7–20 | 6,500 | |
| October 18 | Weber State^{†} | | Gatton Field; Bozeman, MT | L 3–53 | 8,300 | |
| October 25 | at Idaho | | Rogers Field; Pullman, WA | L 21–31 | 10,452–10,500 | |
| November 1 | No. 3 Montana | | Gatton Field; Bozeman, MT (rivalry) | L 6–7 | 9,100–10,000 | |
| November 8 | at Eastern Michigan* | | Rynearson Stadium; Ypsilanti, MI | L 7–31 | 6,500 | |
*Non-conference game; ^{†}Homecoming; Rankings from AP Poll released prior to the game
