= 1969 North Dakota State Bison football team =

American college football season

1969 North Dakota State Bison football

AP small college national champion UPI small college national champion NCC champion

Camellia Bowl, W 30–3 vs. Montana
- Conference: North Central Conference
- Record: 10–0 (6–0 NCC)
- Head coach: Ron Erhardt (4th season)
- Home stadium: Dacotah Field

1969 North Central Conference football standings
	Conf.					Overall
Team	W		L		T	W		L		T
No. 1 North Dakota State $	6	–	0	–	0	10	–	0	–	0
Northern Iowa	4	–	2	–	0	5	–	5	–	0
North Dakota	3	–	3	–	0	4	–	5	–	0
South Dakota State	3	–	3	–	0	3	–	7	–	0
Morningside	2	–	4	–	0	4	–	5	–	0
South Dakota	2	–	4	–	0	3	–	7	–	0
Augustana (SD)	1	–	5	–	0	3	–	6	–	0
$ – Conference champion; Rankings from AP small college poll

The 1969 North Dakota State Bison football team was an American football team that represented North Dakota State University as a member of the North Central Conference (NCC) during the 1969 NCAA College Division football season. In their fourth season under head coach Ron Erhardt, the team compiled a 10–0 record (6–0 against conference opponents) and won the conference championship. The team was also ranked No. 1 in the AP and UPI small college polls. The 1969 season was part of an unbeaten streak that lasted from the team's defeat in the 1967 Pecan Bowl until October 16, 1971.

== Schedule ==
Date	Time	Opponent	Rank	Site	Result	Attendance	Source
September 13	7:30 p.m.	Northern Illinois*		Dacotah Field; Fargo, ND	W 28–0	9,900	
September 20		at Northern Michigan*		Memorial Field; Marquette, MI	W 28–14	7,900	
September 27		at Nebraska–Omaha*	No. 1	Johnny Rosenblatt Stadium; Omaha, NE	W 41–7	5,721	
October 4		South Dakota	No. 1	Dacotah Field; Fargo, ND	W 24–6	11,200	
October 11		at Augustana (SD)	No. 1	Howard Wood Stadium; Sioux Falls, SD	W 62–14	2,600	
October 18		North Dakota^{†}	No. 1	Dacotah Field; Fargo, ND (Nickel Trophy)	W 64–14	14,600	
October 25		at Morningside	No. 1	Roberts Stadium; Sioux City, IA	W 35–20	5,000	
November 1		Northern Iowa	No. 1	Dacotah Field; Fargo, ND	W 41–13	6,200	
November 8		at South Dakota State	No. 1	Coughlin–Alumni Stadium; Brookings, SD (rivalry)	W 20–13	4,500	
December 13		No. 2 Montana*	No. 1	Charles C. Hughes Stadium; Sacramento, CA (Camellia Bowl)	W 30–3	14,900	
*Non-conference game; ^{†}Homecoming; Rankings from AP Poll released prior to the game; All times are in Central time
