= 1969 Central Michigan Chippewas football team =

American college football season

1969 Central Michigan Chippewas football
- Conference: Interstate Intercollegiate Athletic Conference
- Record: 7–3 (2–1 IIAC)
- Head coach: Roy Kramer (3rd season)
- Defensive coordinator: Herb Deromedi (1st season)
- MVP: Dave Farris
- Home stadium: Alumni Field

1969 Interstate Intercollegiate Athletic Conference football standings
	Conf.					Overall
Team	W		L		T	W		L		T
Western Illinois $	3	–	0	–	0	8	–	2	–	0
Central Michigan	2	–	1	–	0	7	–	3	–	0
Illinois State	1	–	2	–	0	5	–	6	–	0
Eastern Illinois	0	–	3	–	0	2	–	7	–	0
$ – Conference champion

The 1969 Central Michigan Chippewas football team represented Central Michigan University in the Interstate Intercollegiate Athletic Conference (IIAC) during the 1969 NCAA College Division football season. In their third season under head coach Roy Kramer, the Chippewas compiled a 7–3 record (2–1 against IIAC opponents) and outscored their opponents, 254 to 147. The team's statistical leaders included quarterback Bob Miles with 305 passing yards, tailback Jesse Lakes with 1,263 rushing yards, and Dave Lemere with 239 receiving yards. On September 27, 1969, Lakes set a school record, rushing for 343 yards (and also scored five touchdowns) in a 41-6 victory over Wisconsin-Milwaukee. Lakes broke Jim Podoley's record of 254 yards set in 1954. Lakes' record was broken in 1994 by Brian Pruitt. Tight end Dave Farris received the team's most valuable player award. Nine Central Michigan players (Lakes, Farris, defensive tackle Ralph Burde, guard Fred Ferguson, linebackers Tom Hahnenberg and Bump Lardie, defensive back Bob Markey, and tackles Mike Post and Jim Prisk) received first-team honors on the All-IIAC team.

== Schedule ==
Date	Time	Opponent	Rank	Site	Result	Attendance	Source
September 13	1:30 p.m.	at Western Michigan*		Waldo Stadium; Kalamazoo, MI (rivalry)	L 0–24	19,100	
September 20		at Northern Iowa*		O. R. Latham Stadium; Cedar Falls, IA	W 28–10	7,000–7,400	
September 27		Milwaukee*		Alumni Field; Mount Pleasant, MI	W 41–6	9,400	
October 4		at Illinois State		Hancock Stadium; Normal, IL	W 21–0	10,000	
October 11		Northern Michigan*		Alumni Field; Mount Pleasant, MI	W 40–37	10,000	
October 18		at Western Illinois	No. 18	Hanson Field; Macomb, IL	L 14–17	13,400	
October 25		Eastern Illinois^{†}		Alumni Field; Mount Pleasant, MI	W 44–0	13,000	
November 1		No. 8 Akron*		Alumni Field; Mount Pleasant, MI	L 6–9	8,800	
November 8		at No. 20 Indiana State*		Memorial Stadium; Terre Haute, IN	W 25–24	4,500	
November 15		at Wayne State (MI)*		Tartar Field; Detroit, MI	W 35–20	1,300	
*Non-conference game; ^{†}Homecoming; Rankings from AP Poll released prior to the game; All times are in Eastern time
