= 1969 Southern Illinois Salukis football team =

American college football season

1969 Southern Illinois Salukis football
- Conference: Independent
- Record: 5–5
- Head coach: Dick Towers (3rd season)
- Home stadium: McAndrew Stadium

1969 NCAA College Division independents football records
	Conf.			Overall
Team	W	L	T	W		L		T
No. 3 Akron		–		9	–	1	–	0
Indiana (PA)		–		8	–	1	–	0
Boston University		–		9	–	2	–	0
No. 9 Tampa		–		8	–	2	–	0
Tennessee State		–		7	–	1	–	1
Colorado College		–		6	–	2	–	0
Drake		–		7	–	2	–	2
Northern Arizona		–		7	–	3	–	0
Illinois College		–		5	–	2	–	1
Mankato State		–		6	–	3	–	0
Hawaii		–		6	–	3	–	1
Indiana State		–		6	–	3	–	1
Ashland		–		5	–	3	–	1
Lincoln (MO)		–		5	–	3	–	1
Portland State		–		6	–	4	–	0
Santa Clara		–		6	–	4	–	0
UNLV		–		6	–	4	–	0
Eastern Michigan		–		5	–	4	–	0
St. Norbert		–		5	–	4	–	0
Cortland		–		4	–	4	–	0
Northern Michigan		–		5	–	5	–	0
Nevada		–		5	–	5	–	0
Rose Poly		–		4	–	4	–	0
Southern Illinois		–		5	–	5	–	0
Wayne State (MI)		–		4	–	4	–	0
Chattanooga		–		4	–	6	–	0
Chicago		–		2	–	4	–	0
Milwaukee		–		3	–	6	–	0
Northeastern		–		3	–	6	–	0
Wabash		–		3	–	6	–	0
Wheaton (IL)		–		3	–	6	–	0
Samford		–		2	–	6	–	1
Lake Forest		–		2	–	6	–	0
Parsons		–		2	–	8	–	0
Kentucky State		–		0	–	8	–	0
Rankings from AP small college poll

The 1969 Southern Illinois Salukis football team was an American football team that represented Southern Illinois University (now known as Southern Illinois University Carbondale) as an independent during the 1969 NCAA College Division football season. Under third-year head coach Dick Towers, the team compiled a 5–5 record. The team played its home games at McAndrew Stadium in Carbondale, Illinois.

== Schedule ==
Date	Opponent	Site	Result	Attendance	Source
September 20	at Louisville	Fairgrounds Stadium; Louisville, KY	L 13–17	9,928	
September 27	at Youngstown State	Rayen Stadium; Youngstown, OH	W 43–14	4,000	
October 4	Tampa	McAndrew Stadium; Carbondale, IL	L 0–31	9,000	
October 11	at Lamar Tech	Cardinal Stadium; Beaumont, TX	L 16–20	11,651	
October 18	Indiana State	McAndrew Stadium; Carbondale, IL	W 29–7	4,500	
October 25	East Carolina	McAndrew Stadium; Carbondale, IL	L 3–17	12,500	
November 1	at Bradley	Peoria Stadium; Peoria, IL	W 36–14	4,200	
November 8	Ball State	McAndrew Stadium; Carbondale, IL	W 48–27	7,500	
November 15	Drake	McAndrew Stadium; Carbondale, IL	L 17–19	2,500	
November 22	at Southwest Missouri State	SMS Stadium; Springfield, MO	W 41–7	500	
