= 1969 New Hampshire Wildcats football team =

American college football season

1969 New Hampshire Wildcats football
- Conference: Yankee Conference
- Record: 3–5 (1–4 Yankee)
- Head coach: Jim Root (2nd season)
- Offensive coordinator: Paul Schudel (2nd season)
- Home stadium: Cowell Stadium

1969 Yankee Conference football standings
	Conf.					Overall
Team	W		L		T	W		L		T
UMass $	5	–	0	–	0	6	–	3	–	0
Connecticut	3	–	2	–	0	5	–	4	–	0
Maine	3	–	2	–	0	5	–	4	–	0
Vermont	2	–	3	–	0	3	–	6	–	0
New Hampshire	1	–	4	–	0	3	–	5	–	0
Rhode Island	1	–	4	–	0	2	–	7	–	0
$ – Conference champion

The 1969 New Hampshire Wildcats football team was an American football team that represented the University of New Hampshire as a member of the Yankee Conference during the 1969 NCAA College Division football season. In its second year under head coach Jim Root, the team compiled a 3–5 record (1–4 against conference opponents) and tied for last place in the Yankee Conference.

== Schedule ==
Date	Opponent	Site	Result	Attendance	Source
September 27	Dartmouth*	Cowell Stadium; Durham, NH (rivalry)	L 0–31	14,000	
October 4	at Connecticut	Memorial Stadium; Storrs, CT	W 14–6	11,270	
October 11	at Maine	Alumni Field; Orono, ME (Battle for the Brice–Cowell Musket)	L 18–20	5,839–6,300	
October 18	Vermont	Cowell Stadium; Durham, NH	L 7–27	12,857	
October 25	Northeastern*	Cowell Stadium; Durham, NH	W 26–8	8,274	
November 1	at Rhode Island	Meade Stadium; Kingston, RI	L 6–14	8,000	
November 8	at Springfield*	Springfield, MA	W 14–8	3,400	
November 15	UMass	Cowell Stadium; Durham, NH (rivalry)	L 7–48	9,214	
*Non-conference game
