= 1969 Connecticut Huskies football team =

American college football season

1969 Connecticut Huskies football
- Conference: Yankee Conference
- Record: 5–4 (3–2 Yankee)
- Head coach: John Toner (4th season)
- Home stadium: Memorial Stadium

1969 Yankee Conference football standings
	Conf.					Overall
Team	W		L		T	W		L		T
UMass $	5	–	0	–	0	6	–	3	–	0
Connecticut	3	–	2	–	0	5	–	4	–	0
Maine	3	–	2	–	0	5	–	4	–	0
Vermont	2	–	3	–	0	3	–	6	–	0
New Hampshire	1	–	4	–	0	3	–	5	–	0
Rhode Island	1	–	4	–	0	2	–	7	–	0
$ – Conference champion

The 1969 Connecticut Huskies football team represented the University of Connecticut in the 1969 NCAA College Division football season. The Huskies were led by fourth year head coach John Toner, and completed the season with a record of 5–4.

== Schedule ==
Date	Opponent	Site	Result	Attendance	Source
September 20	at Vermont	Centennial Field; Burlington, VT	W 26–6	6,500	
September 27	at Yale*	Yale Bowl; New Haven, CT	W 19–15	36,421	
October 4	New Hampshire	Memorial Stadium; Storrs, CT	L 6–14	11,270	
October 18	at Maine	Alumni Field; Orono, ME	W 28–7	9,500–9,561	
October 25	UMass	Memorial Stadium; Storrs, CT (rivalry)	L 7–28	15,134	
November 1	at Boston University*	Nickerson Field; Boston, MA	L 21–37	7,775–8,000	
November 8	Rutgers*	Memorial Stadium; Storrs, CT	W 28–22	10,346	
November 15	at Rhode Island	Meade Stadium; Kingston, RI (rivalry)	W 25–15	3,700	
November 22	Baldwin–Wallace*	Memorial Stadium; Storrs, CT	L 33–43	11,354	
*Non-conference game
