= 1969 Idaho State Bengals football team =

American college football season

1969 Idaho State Bengals football
- Conference: Big Sky Conference
- Record: 5–5 (2–2 Big Sky)
- Head coach: Ed Cavanaugh (2nd season)
- Home stadium: Spud Bowl

1969 Big Sky Conference football standings
	Conf.					Overall
Team	W		L		T	W		L		T
Montana $	4	–	0	–	0	10	–	1	–	0
Weber State	3	–	1	–	0	6	–	4	–	0
Idaho State	2	–	2	–	0	5	–	5	–	0
Idaho	1	–	3	–	0	2	–	8	–	0
Montana State	0	–	4	–	0	1	–	8	–	0
$ – Conference champion

The 1969 Idaho State Bengals football team represented Idaho State University as a member of the Big Sky Conference during the 1969 NCAA College Division football season. Led by second-year head coach Ed Cavanaugh, the Bengals compiled an overall record of 5–5, with a mark of 2–2 in conference play, and finished third in the Big Sky.

== Schedule ==
Date	Opponent	Rank	Site	Result	Attendance	Source
September 20	Parsons*		Spud Bowl; Pocatello, ID	W 48–6		
September 27	at Idaho		Rogers Field; Pullman, WA (rivalry)	W 47–42		
October 4	Nebraska–Omaha*		Spud Bowl; Pocatello, ID	W 46–7	5,600	
October 11	Montana State		Spud Bowl; Pocatello, ID	W 20–7	6,500	
October 18	at No. 4 Montana	No. 20	Dornblaser Field; Missoula, MT	L 36–46	9,800–11,500	
October 25	Weber State		Spud Bowl; Pocatello, ID	L 25–28		
November 1	at Portland State*		Civic Stadium; Portland, OR	W 46–23		
November 8	at UNLV*		Cashman Field; Las Vegas, NV	L 31–35		
November 15	at Boise State*		Bronco Stadium; Boise, ID	L 27–35	11,600	
November 22	Drake*		Spud Bowl; Pocatello, ID	L 30–58	4,300	
*Non-conference game; Rankings from AP Poll released prior to the game
