= 1969 Middle Tennessee Blue Raiders football team =

American college football season

1969 Middle Tennessee Blue Raiders football
- Conference: Ohio Valley Conference
- Record: 1–9 (1–6 OVC)
- Head coach: Donald E. Fuoss (1st season)
- Home stadium: Horace Jones Field

1969 Ohio Valley Conference football standings
| | Conf. | | | | | Overall |
| Team | W | | L | | T | W | | L | | T |
|---|---|---|---|---|---|---|---|---|---|---|
| No. 20/16 East Tennessee State $ | 6 | – | 0 | – | 1 | 10 | – | 0 | – | 1 |
| Western Kentucky | 5 | – | 2 | – | 0 | 6 | – | 3 | – | 1 |
| Eastern Kentucky | 4 | – | 3 | – | 0 | 6 | – | 4 | – | 0 |
| Tennessee Tech | 4 | – | 3 | – | 0 | 5 | – | 5 | – | 0 |
| Morehead State | 3 | – | 4 | – | 0 | 6 | – | 4 | – | 0 |
| Murray State | 2 | – | 4 | – | 1 | 5 | – | 4 | – | 1 |
| Austin Peay | 2 | – | 5 | – | 0 | 2 | – | 7 | – | 1 |
| Middle Tennessee | 1 | – | 6 | – | 0 | 1 | – | 9 | – | 0 |
$ – Conference champion; Rankings from AP/UPI small college polls

The 1969 Middle Tennessee Blue Raiders football team represented Middle Tennessee State University—as a member of the Ohio Valley Conference (OVC) during the 1969 NCAA College Division football season. Led by Donald E. Fuoss in his first and only season as head coach, the Blue Raiders compiled a record an overall record of 1–9 with a mark of 1–6 in conference play, placing last out of eight teams in the OVC.

== Schedule ==
| Date | Opponent | Site | Result | Attendance | Source |
|---|---|---|---|---|---|
| September 20 | at Pensacola Navy* | Warrington, FL | L 20–26 | 5,500 | |
| September 27 | at Morehead State | Jayne Stadium; Morehead, KY | L 9–35 | 8,000 | |
| October 4 | Chattanooga* | Horace Jones Field; Murfreesboro, TN | L 3–7 | 9,000 | |
| October 11 | Eastern Kentucky | Horace Jones Field; Murfreesboro, TN | L 0–14 | 6,800 | |
| October 18 | Murray State | Horace Jones Field; Murfreesboro, TN | W 31–24 | 10,000 | |
| October 25 | at Austin Peay | Clarksville Municipal Stadium; Clarksville, TN | L 17–20 | 6,000 | |
| November 1 | at Ball State* | Ball State Stadium; Muncie, IN | L 12–14 | 6,550 | |
| November 8 | Western Kentucky | Horace Jones Field; Murfreesboro, TN (rivalry) | L 14–28 | 4,000–4,011 | |
| November 15 | at No. 17 East Tennessee State | State College Stadium; Johnson City, TN | L 21–27 | 2,000 | |
| November 27 | at Tennessee Tech | Tucker Stadium; Cookeville, TN | L 7–21 | 6,500 | |
*Non-conference game; Rankings from AP Poll released prior to the game
