= 1969 South Dakota Coyotes football team =

American college football season

1969 South Dakota Coyotes football
- Conference: North Central Conference
- Record: 3–7 (2–4 NCC)
- Head coach: Joe Salem (4th season)
- Home stadium: Inman Field

1969 North Central Conference football standings
	Conf.					Overall
Team	W		L		T	W		L		T
No. 1 North Dakota State $	6	–	0	–	0	10	–	0	–	0
Northern Iowa	4	–	2	–	0	5	–	5	–	0
North Dakota	3	–	3	–	0	4	–	5	–	0
South Dakota State	3	–	3	–	0	3	–	7	–	0
Morningside	2	–	4	–	0	4	–	5	–	0
South Dakota	2	–	4	–	0	3	–	7	–	0
Augustana (SD)	1	–	5	–	0	3	–	6	–	0
$ – Conference champion; Rankings from AP small college poll

The 1969 South Dakota Coyotes football team was an American football team that represented the University of South Dakota in the North Central Conference (NCC) during the 1969 NCAA College Division football season. In its fourth season under head coach Joe Salem, the team compiled a 3–7 record (2–4 against NCC opponents), tied for fifth place out of seven teams in the NCC, and was outscored by a total of 228 to 208. The team played its home games at Inman Field in Vermillion, South Dakota.

== Schedule ==
Date	Time	Opponent	Site	Result	Attendance	Source
September 13		Mankato State*	Inman Field; Vermillion, SD	W 33–0	8,500	
September 20	9:00 p.m.	at Montana*	Memorial Stadium; Great Falls, MT	L 20–31	5,000	
September 27		North Dakota	Inman Field; Vermillion, SD (Sitting Bull Trophy)	L 26–35	6,500	
October 4		at No. 1 North Dakota State	Dacotah Field; Fargo, ND	L 6–24	11,200	
October 11		Morningside	Inman Field; Vermillion, SD	W 39–27	10,000	
October 18		South Dakota State	Inman Field; Vermillion, SD (rivalry)	L 14–20	12,000	
October 25		at Northern Iowa	O. R. Latham Stadium; Cedar Falls, IA	L 2–14	8,000	
November 1		Drake*	Inman Field; Vermillion, SD	L 24–29	3,500	
November 8		Augustana (SD)	Inman Field; Vermillion, SD	W 28–22	5,000	
November 15		at Nebraska–Omaha*	Al F. Caniglia Field; Omaha, NE	L 16–26	2,126	
*Non-conference game; Rankings from AP Poll released prior to the game; All times are in Central time
