= 1969 UMass Redmen football team =

American college football season

1969 UMass Redmen football

Yankee Conference champion
- Conference: Yankee Conference
- Record: 6–3 (5–0 Yankee)
- Head coach: Vic Fusia (9th season)
- Home stadium: Alumni Stadium

1969 Yankee Conference football standings
	Conf.					Overall
Team	W		L		T	W		L		T
UMass $	5	–	0	–	0	6	–	3	–	0
Connecticut	3	–	2	–	0	5	–	4	–	0
Maine	3	–	2	–	0	5	–	4	–	0
Vermont	2	–	3	–	0	3	–	6	–	0
New Hampshire	1	–	4	–	0	3	–	5	–	0
Rhode Island	1	–	4	–	0	2	–	7	–	0
$ – Conference champion

The 1969 UMass Redmen football team represented the University of Massachusetts Amherst in the 1969 NCAA College Division football season as a member of the Yankee Conference. The team was coached by Vic Fusia and played its home games at Alumni Stadium in Hadley, Massachusetts. The 1969 season was the last season in which Fusia led the Redmen to a conference championship. UMass finished the season with a record of 6–3 overall and 5–0 in conference play.

== Schedule ==
Date	Opponent	Site	Result	Attendance	Source
September 20	at Maine	Alumni Field; Orono, ME	W 49–7	8,302–8,500	
September 27	Buffalo*	Alumni Stadium; Hadley, MA (rivalry)	L 6–16	13,200	
October 4	No. 12 Delaware*	Alumni Stadium; Hadley, MA	L 21–33	10,000–10,500	
October 11	at Boston University*	Nickerson Field; Boston, MA	W 14–9	9,772–10,000	
October 18	Rhode Island	Alumni Stadium; Hadley, MA	W 21–9	16,200	
October 25	at Connecticut	Memorial Stadium; Storrs, CT (rivalry)	W 28–7	15,134	
November 1	Vermont	Alumni Stadium; Hadley, MA	W 48–7	11,000–11,200	
November 15	at New Hampshire	Cowell Stadium; Durham, NH (rivalry)	W 48–7	9,214	
November 22	at Boston College*	Alumni Stadium; Chestnut Hill, MA (rivalry)	L 30–35	20,500	
*Non-conference game; Rankings from AP Poll released prior to the game
