= 1969 Eastern Illinois Panthers football team =

American college football season

1969 Eastern Illinois Panthers football
- Conference: Interstate Intercollegiate Athletic Conference
- Record: 2–7 (0–3 IIAC)
- Head coach: Clyde Biggers (5th season)
- Home stadium: Lincoln Field

1969 Interstate Intercollegiate Athletic Conference football standings
	Conf.					Overall
Team	W		L		T	W		L		T
Western Illinois $	3	–	0	–	0	8	–	2	–	0
Central Michigan	2	–	1	–	0	7	–	3	–	0
Illinois State	1	–	2	–	0	5	–	6	–	0
Eastern Illinois	0	–	3	–	0	2	–	7	–	0
$ – Conference champion

The 1969 Eastern Illinois Panthers football team represented Eastern Illinois University as a member of the Interstate Intercollegiate Athletic Conference (IIAC) during the 1969 NCAA College Division football season. The team was led by fifth-year head coach Clyde Biggers and played their home games at Lincoln Field in Charleston, Illinois. The Panthers finished the season with a 2–7 record overall and an 0–3 record in conference play.

== Schedule ==
Date	Opponent	Site	Result	Attendance	Source
September 13	at Indiana State*	Memorial Stadium; Terre Haute, IN	L 6–41	8,500	
September 20	at Milwaukee*	Milwaukee County Stadium; Milwaukee, WI	L 20–21	3,500	
September 27	Chicago Circle*	Lincoln Field; Charleston, IL	W 52–6	4,500	
October 4	Central Missouri State*	Lincoln Field; Charleston, IL	L 14–41	4,000	
October 11	at Northeast Missouri State*	Kirksville, MO	W 8–7	2,000	
October 18	at Illinois State	Hancock Stadium; Normal, IL (rivalry)	L 0–37	18,000–19,000	
October 25	at Central Michigan	Alumni Field; Mount Pleasant, MI	L 0–44	13,000	
November 1	Western Illinois	Lincoln Field; Charleston, IL	L 6–44	8,000	
November 8	Northern Michigan*	Lincoln Field; Charleston, IL	L 14–24	3,500	
*Non-conference game
