= 1969 East Tennessee State Buccaneers football team =

American college football season

1969 East Tennessee State Buccaneers football

OVC champion

Grantland Rice Bowl, W 34–14 vs. Louisiana Tech
- Conference: Ohio Valley Conference

Ranking
- Coaches: No. 16
- AP: No. 20
- Record: 10–0–1 (6–0–1 OVC)
- Head coach: John Robert Bell (4th season)
- Home stadium: University Stadium

1969 Ohio Valley Conference football standings
	Conf.					Overall
Team	W		L		T	W		L		T
No. 20/16 East Tennessee State $	6	–	0	–	1	10	–	0	–	1
Western Kentucky	5	–	2	–	0	6	–	3	–	1
Eastern Kentucky	4	–	3	–	0	6	–	4	–	0
Tennessee Tech	4	–	3	–	0	5	–	5	–	0
Morehead State	3	–	4	–	0	6	–	4	–	0
Murray State	2	–	4	–	1	5	–	4	–	1
Austin Peay	2	–	5	–	0	2	–	7	–	1
Middle Tennessee	1	–	6	–	0	1	–	9	–	0
$ – Conference champion; Rankings from AP/UPI small college polls

The 1969 East Tennessee State Buccaneers football team was an American football team that East Tennessee State University (ETSU) as a member of the Ohio Valley Conference (OVC) in the 1969 NCAA College Division football season. East Tennessee State completed an undefeated season, going 10–0–1 and capturing the OVC championship. This is the only undefeated season and the last conference championship for the program up until 2018. The team capped off the season by defeating Louisiana Tech and future Pro Football Hall of Fame quarterback Terry Bradshaw in the Grantland Rice Bowl.

== Schedule ==
Date	Opponent	Rank	Site	TV	Result	Attendance	Source
September 13	Appalachian State*		University Stadium; Johnson City, TN		W 18–16		
September 20	East Carolina*		University Stadium; Johnson City, TN		W 7–0	5,500	
September 27	No. 4 Eastern Kentucky		University Stadium; Johnson City, TN		W 7–0	9,000	
October 4	at Western Kentucky		L. T. Smith Stadium; Bowling Green, KY		W 16–7	7,500–7,506	
October 11	at Tennessee Tech		Tucker Stadium; Cookeville, TN		W 30–7		
October 18	at Chattanooga*	No. 10	Chamberlain Field; Chattanooga, TN		W 17–13		
October 25	Murray State	No. 7	University Stadium; Johnson City, TN		T 10–10		
November 8	at Morehead State	No. 13	Jayne Stadium; Morehead, KY		W 27–7		
November 15	Middle Tennessee	No. 17	University Stadium; Johnson City, TN		W 27–21	2,000	
November 22	at Austin Peay		Municipal Stadium; Clarksville, TN		W 14–12		
December 13	vs. No. 4 Louisiana Tech*	No. 20	BREC Memorial Stadium; Baton Rouge, LA (Grantland Rice Bowl)	ABC	W 34–14	16,101	
*Non-conference game; Rankings from AP Poll released prior to the game
