= 1969 Grantland Rice Bowl =

East Tennessee State Buccaneers	Louisiana Tech Bulldogs
(9–0–1)	(8–1)
Ohio Valley Conference	Gulf States Conference
34	14
Head coach: John Robert Bell	Head coach: Maxie Lambright
	1	2	3	4	Total
East Tennessee State	6	7	7	14	34
Louisiana Tech	0	0	14	0	14
- Date: December 13, 1969
- Season: 1969
- Stadium: BREC Memorial Stadium
- Location: Baton Rouge, Louisiana
- Referee: Howard Wirtz (MAC; split crew: MAC, Ohio Valley, Gulf States)
- Attendance: 16,101

The 1969 Grantland Rice Bowl was an NCAA College Division game following the 1969 season, between the East Tennessee State Buccaneers and the Louisiana Tech Bulldogs. This was the first time that the Grantland Rice Bowl was played in Baton Rouge, Louisiana – prior games had been played in Murfreesboro, Tennessee.

== Notable participants ==
Louisiana Tech quarterback Terry Bradshaw was selected first in the 1970 NFL draft by the Pittsburgh Steelers. His teammates Larry Brewer and Tommy Spinks were also drafted. Bradshaw and Spinks are inductees of their university's athletic hall of fame, as is head coach Maxie Lambright. Bradshaw is an inductee of both the College Football Hall of Fame and the Pro Football Hall of Fame.

Wide receiver Pat Hauser of East Tennessee State was also selected in the 1970 NFL Draft. Inductees of the university's athletics hall of fame include Hauser, defensive back Bill Casey, quarterback Larry Graham, and head coach John Robert Bell.

== Scoring summary ==
Scoring summary

Quarter	Time	Drive			Team	Scoring information	Score	
Quarter	Time	Plays	Yards	TOP	Team	Scoring information	ETSU	La. Tech
1	7:21	5	19		ETSU	Jerry Daughtry 1-yard touchdown run, Ron Harrold kick failed	6	0
2	9:39	6	58		ETSU	Pat Hauser 37-yard touchdown reception from Mike Young, Ron Harrold kick good	13	0
3	11:24	5	30		La. Tech	Buster Herren 8-yard touchdown reception from Terry Bradshaw, Jorgen Gertz kick good	13	7
3	9:25	4	66		ETSU	Mike Young 5-yard touchdown run, Ron Harrold kick good	20	7
3	2:37	5	48		La. Tech	Tommy Spinks 19-yard touchdown reception from Terry Bradshaw, Jorgen Gertz kick good	20	14
4	9:47		88		ETSU	John Gibson 39-yard touchdown reception from Larry Graham, Ron Harrold kick good	27	14
4	4:54	9	44		ETSU	Rick Anderson 10-yard touchdown reception from Larry Graham, Ron Harrold kick good	34	14
"TOP" = time of possession. For other American football terms, see Glossary of American football.							34	14

=== Statistics ===
	1	2	3	4	Total
Buccaneers	6	7	7	14	34
Bulldogs	0	0	14	0	14

Statistics	ETSU	La. Tech
First downs	15	17
Total offense, yards	419	256
Rushes-yards (net)	53–245	38–(−43)
Passing yards (net)	174	299
Passes, Comp-Att-Int	12–18–0	20–39–3
Time of Possession		

Team	Category	Player	Statistics
ETSU	Passing	Larry Graham	11/17, 137 yds, 2 TD
ETSU	Rushing		
ETSU	Receiving		
La. Tech	Passing	Terry Bradshaw	20/39, 299 yds, 2 TD, 3 INT
La. Tech	Rushing		
La. Tech	Receiving		
