= 1969 Northern Iowa Panthers football team =

American college football season

1969 Northern Iowa Panthers football
- Conference: North Central Conference
- Record: 5–5 (4–2 NCC)
- Head coach: Stan Sheriff (10th season)
- Home stadium: O. R. Latham Stadium

1969 North Central Conference football standings
	Conf.					Overall
Team	W		L		T	W		L		T
No. 1 North Dakota State $	6	–	0	–	0	10	–	0	–	0
Northern Iowa	4	–	2	–	0	5	–	5	–	0
North Dakota	3	–	3	–	0	4	–	5	–	0
South Dakota State	3	–	3	–	0	3	–	7	–	0
Morningside	2	–	4	–	0	4	–	5	–	0
South Dakota	2	–	4	–	0	3	–	7	–	0
Augustana (SD)	1	–	5	–	0	3	–	6	–	0
$ – Conference champion; Rankings from AP small college poll

The 1969 Northern Iowa Panthers football team was an American football team that represented the University of Northern Iowa as a member of the North Central Conference (NCC) during the 1969 NCAA College Division football season. In its tenth season under head coach Stan Sheriff, the team compiled a 5–5 record (4–2 in conference games) and finished in second place in the NCC.

The team's statistical leaders included junior quarterback Bill Raun (1,818 passing yards), junior fullback Roger Jones (676 rushing yards), sophomore halfback Larry Skartvedt (678 receiving yards), and sophomore center Gene Dietrich (40 points scored on 22 extra points and six field goals). Four Northern Iowa players were named to the all-NCC team: halfback Jim Luhring; defensive end Larry Green; defensive guard James Rudd; and linebacker John Williams.

The team played its home games at O. R. Latham Stadium in Cedar Falls, Iowa.

== Schedule ==
Date	Opponent	Site	Result	Attendance	Source
September 13	at Northern Michigan*	Marquette, MI	L 14–24	6,500	
September 20	Central Michigan*	O. R. Latham Stadium; Cedar Falls, IA	L 10–28	7,000–7,400	
September 27	Augustana (SD)	O. R. Latham Stadium; Cedar Falls, IA	L 10–21	7,000	
October 4	at South Dakota State	Coughlin–Alumni Stadium; Brookings, SD	W 24–14	5,000	
October 11	at Drake*	Drake Stadium; Des Moines, IA	W 23–13	12,000	
October 18	at Morningside	Sioux City, IA	W 30–7	6,000	
October 25	South Dakota^{†}	O. R. Latham Stadium; Cedar Falls, IA	W 14–2	8,000	
November 1	at No. 1 North Dakota State	Dacotah Field; Fargo, ND	L 13–41	6,200	
November 8	North Dakota	O. R. Latham Stadium; Cedar Falls, IA	W 40–10	5,000	
November 15	No. 19 Western Illinois*	O. R. Latham Stadium; Cedar Falls, IA	L 14–23	6,500	
*Non-conference game; ^{†}Homecoming; Rankings from AP Poll released prior to the game
