= 1969 Western Kentucky Hilltoppers football team =

American college football season

1969 Western Kentucky Hilltoppers football
- Conference: Ohio Valley Conference
- Record: 6–3–1 (5–2 OVC)
- Head coach: Jimmy Feix (2nd season)
- Captains: Romeo Crennel; Bill Rose
- Home stadium: L. T. Smith Stadium

1969 Ohio Valley Conference football standings
	Conf.					Overall
Team	W		L		T	W		L		T
No. 20/16 East Tennessee State $	6	–	0	–	1	10	–	0	–	1
Western Kentucky	5	–	2	–	0	6	–	3	–	1
Eastern Kentucky	4	–	3	–	0	6	–	4	–	0
Tennessee Tech	4	–	3	–	0	5	–	5	–	0
Morehead State	3	–	4	–	0	6	–	4	–	0
Murray State	2	–	4	–	1	5	–	4	–	1
Austin Peay	2	–	5	–	0	2	–	7	–	1
Middle Tennessee	1	–	6	–	0	1	–	9	–	0
$ – Conference champion; Rankings from AP/UPI small college polls

The 1969 Western Kentucky football team represented Western Kentucky University during the 1969 NCAA College Division football season. The team was led by coach Jimmy Feix, in his second season as coach, the Hilltoppers compiled an overall record of 6–3–1 with a mark of 5–2 in conference play, placing second in the OVC. The team's captains were Romeo Crennel and Bill Rose.

== Schedule ==
Date	Opponent	Site	Result	Attendance	Source
September 20	Indiana State*	L. T. Smith Stadium; Bowling Green, KY	T 7–7	10,800–10,832	
September 27	at Austin Peay	Municipal Stadium; Clarksville, TN	L 27–28	6,500	
October 4	East Tennessee State	L. T. Smith Stadium; Bowling Green, KY	L 7–16	7,500–7,506	
October 11	at Northern Illinois*	Huskie Stadium; DeKalb, IL	W 14–12	13,517	
October 18	Tennessee Tech^{†}	L. T. Smith Stadium; Bowling Green, KY	W 42–0	18,500–18,516	
October 25	at Eastern Kentucky	Hanger Field; Richmond, KY (Battle of the Bluegrass)	W 27–26	20,500	
November 1	Morehead State	L. T. Smith Stadium; Bowling Green, KY	W 27–2	7,500–7,568	
November 8	at Middle Tennessee	Johnny "Red" Floyd Stadium; Murfreesboro, TN (100 Miles of Hate)	W 28–14	4,000–4,011	
November 15	at No. 4 Akron*	Rubber Bowl; Akron, OH	L 18–21	4,500–5,000	
November 22	Murray State	L. T. Smith Stadium; Bowling Green, KY (rivalry)	W 56–14	7,800–7,802	
*Non-conference game; ^{†}Homecoming; Rankings from AP Poll released prior to the game
