= 1969 North Dakota Fighting Sioux football team =

American college football season

1969 North Dakota Fighting Sioux football
- Conference: North Central Conference
- Record: 4–5 (3–3 NCC)
- Head coach: Jerry Olson (2nd season)
- Home stadium: Memorial Stadium

1969 North Central Conference football standings
	Conf.					Overall
Team	W		L		T	W		L		T
No. 1 North Dakota State $	6	–	0	–	0	10	–	0	–	0
Northern Iowa	4	–	2	–	0	5	–	5	–	0
North Dakota	3	–	3	–	0	4	–	5	–	0
South Dakota State	3	–	3	–	0	3	–	7	–	0
Morningside	2	–	4	–	0	4	–	5	–	0
South Dakota	2	–	4	–	0	3	–	7	–	0
Augustana (SD)	1	–	5	–	0	3	–	6	–	0
$ – Conference champion; Rankings from AP small college poll

The 1969 North Dakota Fighting Sioux football team, also known as the Nodaks, was an American football team that represented the University of North Dakota in the North Central Conference (NCC) during the 1969 NCAA College Division football season. In its second year under head coach Jerry Olson, the team compiled a 4–5 record (3–3 against NCC opponents), tied for third place out of seven teams in the NCC, and was outscored by a total of 254 to 205. The team played its home games at Memorial Stadium in Grand Forks, North Dakota.

== Schedule ==
Date	Opponent	Site	Result	Attendance	Source
September 6	St. Cloud State*	Memorial Stadium; Grand Forks, ND	W 26–13	4,500	
September 13	Montana*	Memorial Stadium; Grand Forks, ND	L 10–24	8,000–10,000	
September 20	at Montana State*	Gatton Field; Bozeman, MT	L 16–36	3,000–4,500	
September 27	at South Dakota	Inman Field; Vermillion, SD (Sitting Bull Trophy)	W 35–26	6,500	
October 11	South Dakota State	Memorial Stadium; Grand Forks, ND	L 13–19	3,000	
October 18	at No. 1 North Dakota State	Dacotah Field; Fargo, ND (Nickel Trophy)	L 14–64	14,600	
October 25	Augustana (SD)	Memorial Stadium; Grand Forks, ND	W 33–13	1,500	
November 1	Morningside	Memorial Stadium; Grand Forks, ND	W 48–19	1,700	
November 8	at Northern Iowa	O. R. Latham Stadium; Cedar Falls, IA	L 10–40	5,000	
*Non-conference game; Rankings from AP Poll released prior to the game
