= Wave Myers =

American football player and coach (1926–2008)

Biographical details
- Born: June 7, 1926; Lafayette, Indiana, U.S.
- Died: February 14, 2008 (aged 81); Muncie, Indiana, U.S.

Playing career
- 1949: Ball State

Coaching career (HC unless noted)
- 1950–1952: Carmel HS (IN)
- 1953–1956: Rensselaer Central HS (IN)
- 1957–1958: Huntington North HS (IN)
- 1959: North Side HS (IN)
- 1960–1963: Marion HS (IN)
- 1964–1967: Ball State (line)
- 1968–1970: Ball State

Head coaching record
- Overall: 15–14 (college)

Charles "Wave" Myers (June 7, 1926 – February 14, 2008) was an American football player and coach. Myers was born in 1926 in Lafayette, Indiana. He attended Westfield High School. During World War II, he served in the U.S. Army in Burma and India. After the ware, he attended Ball State Teachers College, playing college football and receiving his bachelor's degree in 1950. He also received a master's degree from Purdue University in 1957. He was a high school football coach for 14 years starting at Carmel High School and later at high schools in Rennselaier, Huntignton, Fort Wayne, and Marion. He joined the coaching state at Ball State in 1965 and served as the head football coach from 1968 to 1970, compiling a record of 15–14. He remained employed by the physical education department at Ball State until 1986. He was inducted into the Ball State University Hall of Fame in 1989 and the Indiana Football Hall of Fame in 2006. Myers and his wife, Jeanette, had two daughters (Cheryl and Susie) and one son (Rex). Myers died in 2008 at age 81.

== Head coaching record ==
=== College ===
Year	Team	Overall	Conference	Standing	Bowl/playoffs
Ball State Cardinals (NCAA College Division independent) (1968–1970)
1968	Ball State	5–4			
1969	Ball State	5–5			
1970	Ball State	5–5			
Ball State:		15–14			
Total:		15–14			
