= 1969 Western Illinois Leathernecks football team =

American college football season

1969 Western Illinois Leathernecks football

IIAC champion
- Conference: Interstate Intercollegiate Athletic Conference
- Record: 8–2 (3–0 IIAC)
- Head coach: Darrell Mudra (1st season)
- Home stadium: Hanson Field

1969 Interstate Intercollegiate Athletic Conference football standings
	Conf.					Overall
Team	W		L		T	W		L		T
Western Illinois $	3	–	0	–	0	8	–	2	–	0
Central Michigan	2	–	1	–	0	7	–	3	–	0
Illinois State	1	–	2	–	0	5	–	6	–	0
Eastern Illinois	0	–	3	–	0	2	–	7	–	0
$ – Conference champion

The 1969 Western Illinois Leathernecks football team represented Western Illinois University as a member of the Interstate Intercollegiate Athletic Conference (IIAC) during the 1969 NCAA College Division football season. They were led by first-year head coach Darrell Mudra and played their home games at Hanson Field. The Leathernecks finished the season with a 8–2 record and a 3–0 record in conference play, winning the IIAC title.

== Schedule ==
Date	Opponent	Rank	Site	Result	Attendance	Source
September 13	at Gustavus Adolphus*		St. Peter, MN	L 20–23	10,500	
September 20	Youngstown State*		Hanson Field; Macomb, IL	W 35–28	10,200	
September 27	at Bradley*		Peoria, IL	W 38–7	4,100	
October 4	Milwaukee*		Hanson Field; Macomb, IL	W 41–0	10,000	
October 11	No. 12 Central Missouri State*		Hanson Field; Macomb, IL	W 31–13	10,000	
October 18	No. 18 Central Michigan		Hanson Field; Macomb, IL	W 17–14	13,400	
October 25	at Drake*		Drake Stadium; Des Moines, IA	L 7–44	14,500	
November 1	at Eastern Illinois		Lincoln Field; Charleston, IL	W 44–6	8,000	
November 8	Illinois State		Hanson Field; Macomb, IL	W 55–13	14,650	
November 15	at Northern Iowa*	No. 19	O. R. Latham Stadium; Cedar Falls, IA	W 23–14	6,500	
*Non-conference game; Rankings from AP Poll released prior to the game
