= 1955 Shepherd Rams football team =

American college football season

1955 Shepherd Rams football

WVIAC champion
- Conference: West Virginia Intercollegiate Athletic Conference
- Record: 8–0 (4–0 WVIAC)
- Head coach: Donald E. Fuoss (3rd season)
- Captains: John Shearer; George Hott; Dick Widdows

1955 West Virginia Intercollegiate Athletic Conference football standings
	Conf.					Overall
Team	W		L		T	W		L		T
Shepherd $	4	–	0	–	0	8	–	0	–	0
Concord	5	–	2	–	0	5	–	4	–	0
West Virginia Tech	3	–	2	–	0	5	–	3	–	1
Fairmont State	6	–	3	–	0	6	–	3	–	0
West Liberty State	3	–	3	–	0	3	–	4	–	1
Potomac State	4	–	4	–	0	4	–	4	–	0
West Virginia Wesleyan	3	–	4	–	0	3	–	5	–	0
Salem	3	–	4	–	0	4	–	4	–	0
Glenville State	1	–	7	–	0	1	–	7	–	0
Davis & Elkins	0	–	7	–	0	0	–	7	–	0
Morris Harvey *	2	–	0	–	0	4	–	5	–	0
Bethany (WV) *	2	–	0	–	0	6	–	1	–	0
Bluefield State *	1	–	0	–	0	7	–	2	–	1
West Virginia State *	0	–	1	–	0	1	–	7	–	0
$ – Conference champion; * – Did not qualify for conference standings Conference standings based on power ratings

The 1955 Shepherd Rams football team represented Shepherd University as a member of the West Virginia Intercollegiate Athletic Conference (WVIAC) during the 1955 college football season. In their third and final season under head coach Donald E. Fuoss, the Rams compiled a perfect 8–0 record, shut out four of eight opponents, and outscored opponents by a total of 299 to 31. Shepherd has a record of 4–0 in conference play, winning the WVIAC title.

It was the first WVIAC championship in the history of athletics at Shepherd. It was also the first perfect season in 30 years of Shepherd football history. The Rams out-gained opponents by an average of 397.8 yards per game to 160.1 yards per game. Only one other team in the country scored more points than Shepherd, and that team played one more game than Shepherd. Its average of 33.9 points per game was the highest in the country. The team was inducted into the Shepherd University Athletic Hall of Fame in 2016.

The team's key players included quarterback John Shearer, halfbacks George Hott and Barry Hall, and ends Bill Gaskins and Dick Widdows. Shearer led the WVIAC in total offense (1,278 yards) and passing (1,002 yards). Hott led the conference in scoring.

In the fall of 1955, Shepherd was a small college with an enrollment of 1,600 students. There were no athletic scholarships, no grants-in-aid, and no booster club. The Rams played their home games in Shepherdstown, West Virginia.

== Schedule ==
Date	Opponent	Site	Result	Attendance	Source
September 17	at Fairmont State	Fairmont, WV	W 26–6		
September 24	at Glenville State	Glenville, WV	W 26–6		
October 8	at Bridgewater*	Bridgewater, VA	W 24–0		
October 15	Potomac State^{†}	Shepherdstown, WV	W 33–0		
October 22	vs. Davis & Elkins	Winchester, VA	W 47–6		
October 29	Gallaudet*	Shepherdstown, WV	W 41–13		
November 5	District of Columbia Teachers*	Shepherdstown, WV	W 56–0		
November 12	Apprentice*	Shepherdstown, WV	W 46–0		
*Non-conference game; ^{†}Homecoming

== Players ==
- Claude Flagg
- Bill Gaskins, end
- Barry Hall, halfback
- George "Red" Hott, halfback and co-captain, 6'3", 195 pounds
- Dick Hughes
- John Pratico
- John Shearer, quarterback and co-captain, 6'3", 200 pounds
- Cinders Snyder
- Barney Tucker
- Dick Widdows, end and co-captain
