= 1969 Rhode Island Rams football team =

American college football season

1969 Rhode Island Rams football
- Conference: Yankee Conference
- Record: 2–7 (1–4 Yankee)
- Head coach: Jack Zilly (7th season)
- Home stadium: Meade Stadium

1969 Yankee Conference football standings
	Conf.					Overall
Team	W		L		T	W		L		T
UMass $	5	–	0	–	0	6	–	3	–	0
Connecticut	3	–	2	–	0	5	–	4	–	0
Maine	3	–	2	–	0	5	–	4	–	0
Vermont	2	–	3	–	0	3	–	6	–	0
New Hampshire	1	–	4	–	0	3	–	5	–	0
Rhode Island	1	–	4	–	0	2	–	7	–	0
$ – Conference champion

The 1969 Rhode Island Rams football team was an American football team that represented the University of Rhode Island as a member of the Yankee Conference during the 1969 NCAA College Division football season. In its seventh and final season under head coach Jack Zilly, the team compiled a 2–7 record (1–4 against conference opponents), tied for last place in the Yankee Conference, and was outscored by a total of 226 to 88. The team played its home games at Meade Stadium in Kingston, Rhode Island.

== Schedule ==
Date	Opponent	Site	Result	Attendance	Source
September 20	Temple*	Meade Stadium; Kingston, RI	L 3–47	7,000–7,318	
September 27	at Brown*	Brown Stadium; Providence, RI (rivalry)	L 0–21	12,200	
October 4	Maine	Meade Stadium; Kingston, RI	L 7–35	11,100	
October 11	at Vermont	Centennial Field; Burlington, VT	L 14–41	7,500	
October 18	at UMass	Alumni Stadium; Hadley, MA	L 9–21	16,200	
October 25	Cortland*	Meade Stadium; Kingston, RI	W 13–3		
November 1	New Hampshire	Meade Stadium; Kingston, RI	W 14–6	8,000	
November 8	at Boston University*	Nickerson Field; Boston, MA	L 13–27	5,240–5,500	
November 15	Connecticut	Meade Stadium; Kingston, RI (rivalry)	L 15–25	3,700	
*Non-conference game
