= Jim Root (gridiron football) =

American gridiron football player and coach (1931–2003)

No. 9, 99, 17
- Position: Quarterback

Personal information
- Born: August 17, 1931; Toledo, Ohio, U.S.
- Died: May 26, 2003 (aged 71); Orange Park, Florida, U.S.
- Listed height: 6 ft 1 in (1.85 m)
- Listed weight: 185 lb (84 kg)

Career information
- High school: Libbey (Toledo)
- College: Miami (OH)
- NFL draft: 1953: 23rd round, 268th overall pick

Career history

Playing
- Chicago Cardinals (1953); Ottawa Rough Riders (1954); Chicago Cardinals (1956)

Coaching
- Tulane (1958–1959) Backfield; Miami (FL) (1960–1963) Backfield; Dartmouth (1964) Offensive backfield; Yale (1965–1967) Offensive backfield; New Hampshire (1968–1971) Head coach; William & Mary (1972–1979) Head coach

Career NFL statistics
- Passing attempts: 249
- Passing completions: 108
- Completion percentage: 43.4%
- TD–INT: 11–16
- Passing yards: 1,482
- Passer rating: 51
- Stats at Pro Football Reference

James Frederic Root (August 17, 1931 – May 26, 2003) was an American gridiron football player and coach. He played professionally as a quarterback in the National Football League (NFL) for two seasons with the Chicago Cardinals (1953, 1956) and in the Canadian Football League (CFL) for one season with the Ottawa Rough Riders (1954). Root served as the head football coach at the University of New Hampshire from 1968 to 1971 and at the College of William & Mary from 1972 to 1979, compiling a career college football record of 57–62–2 in 12 seasons. Root was a native of Toledo, Ohio. He played college football at Miami University under Woody Hayes and Ara Parseghian. Root began his coaching career in 1958 as the backfield coach at Tulane University. He moved to the University of Miami as backfield coach in 1960. Root then coached for one season, in 1964, as offensive backfield coach at Dartmouth College, before moving to Yale University, where he served in the same capacity for three seasons.

== Head coaching record ==
Year	Team	Overall	Conference	Standing	Bowl/playoffs
New Hampshire Wildcats (Yankee Conference) (1968–1971)
1968	New Hampshire	6–2	4–1	T–1st	
1969	New Hampshire	3–5	1–4	T–5th	
1970	New Hampshire	5–3	3–2	T–3rd	
1971	New Hampshire	4–4–1	3–2	3rd	
New Hampshire:		18–14–1	11–9		
William & Mary Indians (Southern Conference) (1972–1976)
1972	William & Mary	5–6	4–2	3rd	
1973	William & Mary	6–5	3–2	3rd	
1974	William & Mary	4–7	2–3	6th	
1975	William & Mary	2–9	2–3	5th	
1976	William & Mary	7–4	3–1	2nd	
William & Mary Indians/Tribe (NCAA Division I / I-A independent) (1977–1979)
1977	William & Mary	6–5			
1978	William & Mary	5–5–1			
1979	William & Mary	4–7			
William & Mary:		39–48–1	14–11		
Total:		57–62–1			
National championship Conference title Conference division title or championship game berth
