= 1969 Weber State Wildcats football team =

American college football season

1969 Weber State Wildcats football
- Conference: Big Sky Conference
- Record: 6–4 (3–1 Big Sky)
- Head coach: Sark Arslanian (5th season)
- Home stadium: Wildcat Stadium

1969 Big Sky Conference football standings
	Conf.					Overall
Team	W		L		T	W		L		T
Montana $	4	–	0	–	0	10	–	1	–	0
Weber State	3	–	1	–	0	6	–	4	–	0
Idaho State	2	–	2	–	0	5	–	5	–	0
Idaho	1	–	3	–	0	2	–	8	–	0
Montana State	0	–	4	–	0	1	–	8	–	0
$ – Conference champion

The 1969 Weber State Wildcats football team represented Weber State College (now known as Weber State University) as a member of the Big Sky Conference during the 1969 NCAA College Division football season. Led by fifth-year head coach Sark Arslanian, the Wildcats compiled an overall record of 6–4, with a mark of 3–1 in conference play, and finished second in the Big Sky.

== Schedule ==
Date	Time	Opponent	Site	Result	Attendance	Source
September 13		South Dakota State*	Wildcat Stadium; Ogden, UT	W 28–13	13,642	
September 20		Eastern Washington*	Wildcat Stadium; Ogden, UT	W 52–6	8,486	
September 27		Northern Michigan*	Wildcat Stadium; Ogden, UT	L 23–24	12,843	
October 4		No. 9 Montana	Wildcat Stadium; Ogden, UT	L 17–20	11,043–11,843	
October 11	1:00 p.m.	at North Texas State*	Fouts Field; Denton, TX	L 13–35	2,000–5,000	
October 18		at Montana State	Gatton Field; Bozeman, MT	W 53–3	8,300	
October 25		at Idaho State	Spud Bowl; Pocatello, ID	W 28–25	6,500	
November 1		No. 14 Northern Arizona*	Wildcat Stadium; Ogden, UT	L 19–21	6,159	
November 8		Idaho	Wildcat Stadium; Ogden, UT	W 28–7	9,395	
November 15		at Parsons*	Blum Stadium; Fairfield, IA	W 16–6	4,000	
*Non-conference game; Rankings from AP Poll released prior to the game; All times are in Mountain time
