= 1968 East Tennessee State Buccaneers football team =

American college football season

1968 East Tennessee State Buccaneers football
- Conference: Ohio Valley Conference
- Record: 5–5 (4–3 OVC)
- Head coach: John Robert Bell (3rd season)
- Home stadium: University Stadium

1968 Ohio Valley Conference football standings
	Conf.					Overall
Team	W		L		T	W		L		T
No. 9/8 Eastern Kentucky $	7	–	0	–	0	8	–	2	–	0
No. 19/17 Western Kentucky	5	–	2	–	0	7	–	2	–	1
Murray State	5	–	2	–	0	7	–	2	–	1
East Tennessee State	4	–	3	–	0	5	–	5	–	0
Austin Peay	3	–	4	–	0	5	–	5	–	0
Tennessee Tech	2	–	5	–	0	2	–	8	–	0
Morehead State	1	–	6	–	0	3	–	6	–	1
Middle Tennessee	1	–	6	–	0	2	–	8	–	0
$ – Conference champion; Rankings from AP/UPI small college polls

The 1968 East Tennessee State Buccaneers football team represented East Tennessee State University as a member of the Ohio Valley Conference (OVC) during the 1968 NCAA College Division football season. Led by third-year head coach John Robert Bell, the Buccaneers compiled an overall record of 5–5, with a mark of 4–3 in conference play, and finished fourth in the OVC.

== Schedule ==
Date	Opponent	Site	Result	Attendance	Source
September 28	at Eastern Kentucky	Hanger Field; Richmond, KY	L 20–23	10,000	
October 5	No. 16 Western Kentucky	University Stadium; Johnson City, TN	L 0–23	6,500	
October 12	Tennessee Tech	University Stadium; Johnson City, TN	W 14–6	7,500	
October 19	at No. 9 Chattanooga*	Chamberlain Field; Chattanooga, TN	L 6–16	8,000	
October 26	at Murray State	Cutchin Stadium; Murray, KY	L 17–30		
November 2	at Quantico Marines*	Butler Stadium; Quantico, VA	L 20–23	4,300	
November 9	Morehead State	University Stadium; Johnson City, TN	W 16–13	1,000	
November 16	at Middle Tennessee	Horace Jones Field; Murfreesboro, TN	W 24–21	5,000	
November 23	Austin Peay	University Stadium; Johnson City, TN	W 17–8	2,000	
November 30	East Carolina*	University Stadium; Johnson City, TN	W 17–7	2,000	
*Non-conference game; Rankings from AP Poll released prior to the game; Source:
