= 1969 Vermont Catamounts football team =

American college football season

1969 Vermont Catamounts football
- Conference: Yankee Conference
- Record: 3–6 (2–3 Yankee)
- Head coach: Bob Clifford (8th season)
- Home stadium: Centennial Field

1969 Yankee Conference football standings
	Conf.					Overall
Team	W		L		T	W		L		T
UMass $	5	–	0	–	0	6	–	3	–	0
Connecticut	3	–	2	–	0	5	–	4	–	0
Maine	3	–	2	–	0	5	–	4	–	0
Vermont	2	–	3	–	0	3	–	6	–	0
New Hampshire	1	–	4	–	0	3	–	5	–	0
Rhode Island	1	–	4	–	0	2	–	7	–	0
$ – Conference champion

The 1969 Vermont Catamounts football team was an American football team that represented the University of Vermont in the Yankee Conference during the 1969 NCAA College Division football season. In their eighth year under head coach Bob Clifford, the team compiled a 3–6 record.

== Schedule ==
Date	Opponent	Site	Result	Attendance	Source
September 20	Connecticut	Centennial Field; Burlington, VT	L 6–26	6,500	
September 27	at Boston University*	Nickerson Field; Boston, MA	L 7–27	6,200–8,500	
October 4	Northeastern*	Centennial Field; Burlington, VT	W 39–31	5,000	
October 11	Rhode Island^{†}	Centennial Field; Burlington, VT	W 41–14	7,500	
October 18	at New Hampshire	Cowell Stadium; Durham, NH	W 27–7	11,800–12,857	
October 25	at Wilkes*	Wilkes-Barre, PA	L 7–17	7,000	
November 1	at UMass	Alumni Stadium; Hadley, MA	L 7–48	11,000–11,200	
November 8	Lafayette*	Centennial Field; Burlington, VT	L 17–28	6,500–6,950	
November 15	Maine	Centennial Field; Burlington, VT	L 30–38	5,500	
*Non-conference game; ^{†}Homecoming
