= Dan Boisture =

American football player and coach (1925–2007)

Biographical details
- Born: February 22, 1925; Detroit, Michigan, U.S.
- Died: May 18, 2007 (aged 82); Wyandotte, Michigan, U.S.

Playing career
- 1946-1949: Detroit
- Position: End

Coaching career (HC unless noted)
- 1959–1966: Michigan State (assistant)
- 1967–1973: Eastern Michigan
- 1974: Detroit Wheels

Head coaching record
- Overall: 45–20–3 (college)
- Bowls: 0–1

Daniel P. Boisture Jr. (February 22, 1925 – May 18, 2007) was an American football coach. He was the head coach of the Eastern Michigan Eagles football team from 1967 to 1973, compiling a record of 45–20–3.

Boisture was a star athlete in high school, playing both basketball and football at Detroit Holy Redeemer. He served in the United States Marine Corps in the Pacific Theater during World War II, and was wounded in the Battle of Okinawa, for which he was awarded a Purple Heart. After returning home, he was recruited as a basketball player by Notre Dame, but instead attended the University of Detroit, where he lettered four times in football as an end, and twice in basketball. In 1949, Boisture helped the University of Detroit football team win the Missouri Valley Conference championship in the school's first year in the conference.

Boisture began his coaching career as a high school football coach at Dearborn St. Alphonsus High School and Ecorse St. Francis Xavier High School. From 1954 through 1958, he coached at Detroit St. Mary's of Redford High School in the Detroit Catholic League, where his teams accumulated a 37–4–2 record and won the Catholic League championship four of the five years he coached there. In 1959, at the age of 33, he became an assistant coach at Michigan State University, under Duffy Daugherty, where he stayed through the 1966 season. During his time at Michigan State, the team won two national championships, in 1965 and 1966.

In July 1967, Boisture was hired as head coach at Eastern Michigan University. He later commented that he was willing to go to a smaller school, saying, "There weren't many jobs open...Joan and I looked at the campus. It was a cute campus." Under his leadership, the team produced the longest period of sustained success since Elton Rynearson's days. The team posted winning seasons in all seven years of Boisture's coaching, including a 13-game winning streak that remains a school record. His 1971 squad finished the regular season 7–0–2, only allowing one touchdown in the last five games, before losing to Louisiana Tech in the Pioneer Bowl, the first bowl trip in school history. Boisture was named NCAA District Four "coach of the year" in 1971.

Boisture's tenure at Eastern Michigan is also notable for the construction of Rynearson Stadium. Boisture's teams played their first two seasons at the old field, near the corner of Oakwood and Washtenaw, just west of McKenny Union. In 1969, the new stadium, which was considered off-campus at the time, opened with a capacity of 15,500. Boisture's bowl-bound 1971 team played for one of the few sellout crowds in the stadium's history, a 0–0 tie against Eastern Kentucky on October 16, 1971, which drew 17,360 spectators.

In February 1974, Boisture left Eastern Michigan to coach the Detroit Wheels, in the Central Division of the World Football League, who also played home games at Rynearson Stadium. After playing a partial 1974 season of 14 games (out of a planned 20-game season), for a 1–13 record, the Wheels folded.

Following his experience with the World Football League, Boisture decided to leave coaching. "It was a hardship on the family, moving like we were moving...When the Wheels went defunct, I could have gone with a couple pro teams, and I said, 'That's it.'...I was in a position to continue in pro ball or get something more stable. I made the right choice." He and his family settled in Wyandotte, Michigan, and started a marketing firm dealing internationally with military equipment, from which he retired in 1990.

Boisture was inducted into Eastern Michigan University's Athletic Hall of Fame in 2005.

Boisture was the older brother of Tom Boisture, who played football at Mississippi State University and later coached at the University of Houston and the College of the Holy Cross. His grandson, Joe, played quarterback for Michigan State.

== Head coaching record ==
Year	Team	Overall	Conference	Standing	Bowl/playoffs
Eastern Michigan Hurons (NCAA College Division / NCAA Division II independent) (1967–1973)
1967	Eastern Michigan	6–3			
1968	Eastern Michigan	8–2			
1969	Eastern Michigan	5–4			
1970	Eastern Michigan	7–2–1			
1971	Eastern Michigan	7–1–2			L Pioneer
1972	Eastern Michigan	6–4			
1973	Eastern Michigan	6–4			
Eastern Michigan:		45–20–3			
Total:		45–20–3			
