= Randy Montgomery =

American football player (born 1947)

No. 21, 27
- Position: Cornerback

Personal information
- Born: August 12, 1947 (age 79); Houston, Texas, U.S.
- Listed height: 5 ft 11 in (1.80 m)
- Listed weight: 182 lb (83 kg)

Career information
- High school: Cleveland (WA)
- College: Weber State
- NFL draft: 1970: 7th round, 167th overall pick

Career history
- Denver Broncos (1970–1973); Chicago Bears (1974)

Career NFL statistics
- Interceptions: 3
- Kick Return Yds: 858
- Kick Return Avg: 25.2
- Stats at Pro Football Reference

Randle John Montgomery (born August 12, 1947) was a National Football League (NFL) cornerback and kick returner for the Denver Broncos and Chicago Bears. After going to high school at Cleveland (Seattle, WA), Montgomery attended Everett JC and Weber State University. Montgomery made his professional debut in the NFL in 1971 with the Denver Broncos. He later played with the Chicago Bears. Over his 4-year career he played in 40 games at cornerback, starting 10. He also played several games at kick returner.

Statistically, 1972 was Randy Montgomery's best year, as he had 756 kick return yards and ran back a kickoff for a touchdown.

== Stats ==
Year	Team	Games	Returns	Return Avg	Return yards	Return TD's	Long	INT's
1971	Denver Broncos	3	4	20.0	82	0	34	0
1972	Denver Broncos	14	29	26.1	756	1	94	1
1973	Denver Broncos	9	1	22.0	22	0	22	0
1974	Chicago Bears	14	0	0	0	0	0	2
Career Statistics		40	34	25.2	858	1	94	3
