= Donald E. Fuoss =

American football and basketball coach (1923–2014)

Biographical details
- Born: February 19, 1923; Altoona, Pennsylvania, U.S.
- Died: June 25, 2014 (aged 91)

Playing career

Football
- 1940–1941: Catawba
- 1946: Catawba
- Position: Center

Coaching career (HC unless noted)

Football
- 1948–1950: Bethany (WV) (assistant)
- 1951–1952: Bethany (WV)
- 1953–1955: Shepherd
- 1956–1959: East Orange HS (NJ)
- 1960–1968: Purdue (assistant)
- 1969: Middle Tennessee

Basketball
- 1953–1956: Shepherd

Administrative career (AD unless noted)
- 1971–1975: Sacramento State

Head coaching record
- Overall: 20–27–2 (college football); 28–36 (college basketball)

Accomplishments and honors

Championships
- Football; 1 WVIAC (1955)

Donald Eugene Fuoss (February 19, 1923 – June 25, 2014) was an American football and basketball coach. He served as the head football coach at Bethany College in Bethany, West Virginia from 1951 to 1952, Shepherd University in Shepherdstown, West Virginia from 1953 to 1955, and Middle Tennessee State University in 1969. Fuoss was also the head basketball coach at Shepherd from 1953 to 1956, tallying a mark of 28–36. From 1971 to 1975, he was the athletic director at California State University, Sacramento.

== Head coaching record ==
=== College football ===
Year	Team	Overall	Conference	Standing	Bowl/playoffs
Bethany Bison (West Virginia Intercollegiate Athletic Conference) (1951–1952)
1951	Bethany	3–5	0–1	NA	
1952	Bethany	1–6	0–1	NA	
Bethany:		4–11	0–2		
Shepherd Rams (West Virginia Intercollegiate Athletic Conference) (1953–1955)
1953	Shepherd	2–5–1	1–1	NA	
1954	Shepherd	5–2–1	2–1–1	4th	
1955	Shepherd	8–0	4–0	1st	
Shepherd:		15–7–2	7–2–1		
Middle Tennessee Blue Raiders (Ohio Valley Conference) (1969)
1969	Middle Tennessee	1–9	1–6	8th	
Middle Tennessee:		1–9	1–6		
Total:		20–27–2			
National championship Conference title Conference division title or championship game berth
