= John Mosier (American football) =

American football player (born 1948)

No. 85, 88
- Position: Tight end

Personal information
- Born: March 1, 1948 (age 78); Wichita Falls, Texas, U.S.
- Listed height: 6 ft 3 in (1.91 m)
- Listed weight: 220 lb (100 kg)

Career information
- High school: West (KS) Wichita
- College: Kansas
- NFL draft: 1970: 6th round, 141st overall pick

Career history
- Denver Broncos (1971); Baltimore Colts (1972); Buffalo Bills (1973)*; New England Patriots (1973)
- * Offseason or practice squad member only

Awards and highlights
- First-team All-Big Eight (1968); Second-team All-Big Eight (1967); Big Eight Newcomer of the Year (1967)

Career NFL statistics
- Games played: 25
- Receptions: 4
- Receiving yards: 89
- Receiving touchdowns: 0
- Stats at Pro Football Reference

John Paul Mosier (born March 1, 1948) is an American former professional football player who was a tight end in the National Football League (NFL). He played college football at Kansas.

== Early life ==
Mosier was born in Wichita Falls, Texas and grew up in Wichita, Kansas, where he attended Wichita West High School, where he played basketball and football. As a junior and senior Mosier was the school's starting quarterback and posted an 18-0 record and was named All-State in 1965. He was named All-City as a senior in basketball.

== College career ==
Mosier was a three year starter for the Kansas Jayhawks. He set school records with 37 receptions for 495 yards and four touchdowns and was named the Big Eight Conference Newcomer of the Year. He was named second-team All-Big Eight Conference as a junior. Mosier finished his collegiate career with 87 receptions for 1,115 yards and six touchdowns.

== Professional career ==
Mosier was selected in the sixth round of the 1970 NFL by the Denver Broncos. In 1971 he had 3 receptions for 36 yards and rushed for 31 yards on 4 carries. Mosier was traded to the Baltimore Colts before the 1972 season. He played in all 14 of the team's games with one reception of 53 yards against the New York Jets.

Mosier was traded to the Buffalo Bills for a draft pick in 1973, but was cut during training camp. He was signed by the New England Patriots but did not appear in any games for the team.
