= 1969 Eastern Michigan Hurons football team =

American college football season

1969 Eastern Michigan Hurons football
- Conference: Independent
- Record: 5–4
- Head coach: Dan Boisture (3rd season)
- Captains: Bob Lints; Gary Matsche
- Home stadium: Rynearson Stadium

1969 NCAA College Division independents football records
	Conf.			Overall
Team	W	L	T	W		L		T
No. 3 Akron		–		9	–	1	–	0
Indiana (PA)		–		8	–	1	–	0
Boston University		–		9	–	2	–	0
No. 9 Tampa		–		8	–	2	–	0
Tennessee State		–		7	–	1	–	1
Colorado College		–		6	–	2	–	0
Drake		–		7	–	2	–	2
Northern Arizona		–		7	–	3	–	0
Illinois College		–		5	–	2	–	1
Mankato State		–		6	–	3	–	0
Hawaii		–		6	–	3	–	1
Indiana State		–		6	–	3	–	1
Ashland		–		5	–	3	–	1
Lincoln (MO)		–		5	–	3	–	1
Portland State		–		6	–	4	–	0
Santa Clara		–		6	–	4	–	0
UNLV		–		6	–	4	–	0
Eastern Michigan		–		5	–	4	–	0
St. Norbert		–		5	–	4	–	0
Cortland		–		4	–	4	–	0
Northern Michigan		–		5	–	5	–	0
Nevada		–		5	–	5	–	0
Rose Poly		–		4	–	4	–	0
Southern Illinois		–		5	–	5	–	0
Wayne State (MI)		–		4	–	4	–	0
Chattanooga		–		4	–	6	–	0
Chicago		–		2	–	4	–	0
Milwaukee		–		3	–	6	–	0
Northeastern		–		3	–	6	–	0
Wabash		–		3	–	6	–	0
Wheaton (IL)		–		3	–	6	–	0
Samford		–		2	–	6	–	1
Lake Forest		–		2	–	6	–	0
Parsons		–		2	–	8	–	0
Kentucky State		–		0	–	8	–	0
Rankings from AP small college poll

The 1969 Eastern Michigan Hurons football team represented Eastern Michigan University as an independent during the 1969 NCAA College Division football season. In their third season under head coach Dan Boisture, the Hurons compiled a 5–4 record and outscored their opponents, 255 to 106.

On September 27, 1969, the Hurons played their first game in Rynearson Stadium, built at a cost of $1.4 million. The Hurons won the opening game, 10-3, over Akron in front of a crowd of 12,100 spectators. The formal dedication of the new stadium was held on October 25, 1969, before a homecoming day crowd of 17,600; the Hurons lost to Tampa, 17-7, in the dedication day game.

== Schedule ==
Date	Opponent	Site	Result	Attendance	Source
September 20	at Murray State	Murray, KY	L 20–28	8,000	
September 27	No. 7 Akron	Rynearson Stadium; Ypsilanti, MI	W 10–3	12,100	
October 4	at Indiana State	Memorial Stadium; Terre Haute, IN	L 13–14	15,000	
October 11	at Waynesburg	Waynesburg, PA	W 48–0	3,000	
October 18	Kentucky State	Rynearson Stadium; Ypsilanti, MI	W 48–6	8,900	
October 25	Tampa^{†}	Rynearson Stadium; Ypsilanti, MI	L 7–17	17,600	
November 1	at Northeastern	Boston, MA	W 56–0	3,200	
November 8	Montana State	Rynearson Stadium; Ypsilanti, MI	W 31–7	6,500	
November 15	at Ball State	Ball State Stadium; Muncie, IN	L 22–31	2,000–2,700	
^{†}Homecoming; Rankings from AP Poll released prior to the game

== After the season ==
The following Huron was selected in the 1970 NFL draft after the season.

Round	Pick	Player	Position	NFL club
14	353	Bob Lints	Guard	Green Bay Packers
