= 1969 Akron Zips football team =

American college football season

1969 Akron Zips football
- Conference: Independent
- Record: 9–1
- Head coach: Gordon K. Larson (9th season)
- Captains: Dave Holian; John Vargo
- Home stadium: Rubber Bowl

1969 NCAA College Division independents football records
	Conf.			Overall
Team	W	L	T	W		L		T
No. 3 Akron		–		9	–	1	–	0
Indiana (PA)		–		8	–	1	–	0
Boston University		–		9	–	2	–	0
No. 9 Tampa		–		8	–	2	–	0
Tennessee State		–		7	–	1	–	1
Colorado College		–		6	–	2	–	0
Drake		–		7	–	2	–	2
Northern Arizona		–		7	–	3	–	0
Illinois College		–		5	–	2	–	1
Mankato State		–		6	–	3	–	0
Hawaii		–		6	–	3	–	1
Indiana State		–		6	–	3	–	1
Ashland		–		5	–	3	–	1
Lincoln (MO)		–		5	–	3	–	1
Portland State		–		6	–	4	–	0
Santa Clara		–		6	–	4	–	0
UNLV		–		6	–	4	–	0
Eastern Michigan		–		5	–	4	–	0
St. Norbert		–		5	–	4	–	0
Cortland		–		4	–	4	–	0
Northern Michigan		–		5	–	5	–	0
Nevada		–		5	–	5	–	0
Rose Poly		–		4	–	4	–	0
Southern Illinois		–		5	–	5	–	0
Wayne State (MI)		–		4	–	4	–	0
Chattanooga		–		4	–	6	–	0
Chicago		–		2	–	4	–	0
Milwaukee		–		3	–	6	–	0
Northeastern		–		3	–	6	–	0
Wabash		–		3	–	6	–	0
Wheaton (IL)		–		3	–	6	–	0
Samford		–		2	–	6	–	1
Lake Forest		–		2	–	6	–	0
Parsons		–		2	–	8	–	0
Kentucky State		–		0	–	8	–	0
Rankings from AP small college poll

The 1969 Akron Zips football team represented Akron University in the 1969 NCAA College Division football season as an independent. Led by ninth-year head coach Gordon K. Larson, the Zips played their home games at the Rubber Bowl in Akron, Ohio. They finished the season with a record of 9–1, ranked third in the AP small college poll, and outscored their opponents 316–103.

== Schedule ==
Date	Time	Opponent	Rank	Site	Result	Attendance	Source
September 13		at Butler		Butler Bowl; Indianapolis, IN	W 52–0	4,550	
September 20		Tampa		Rubber Bowl; Akron, OH	W 40–0	42,869	
September 27		at Eastern Michigan	No. 7	Rynearson Stadium; Ypsilanti, MI	L 3–10	12,100	
October 4		Ball State	No. 18	Rubber Bowl; Akron, OH	W 49–9	6,726–6,736	
October 11		Illinois State	No. 10	Rubber Bowl; Akron, OH	W 40–14	7,556	
October 18		Eastern Kentucky	No. 7	Rubber Bowl; Akron, OH	W 28–9	13,506	
October 25	1:30 p.m.	at Dayton	No. 9	Baujan Field; Dayton, OH	W 14–10	10,422	
November 1		at Central Michigan	No. 8	Perry Shorts Stadium; Mount Pleasant, MI	W 9–6	8,800	
November 8		vs. Youngstown State	No. 5	Rudy Sharkey Stadium; Barberton, OH (Steel Tire)	W 60–27	7,200	
November 15		Western Kentucky	No. 4	Rubber Bowl; Akron, OH	W 21–18	4,500–5,000	
Rankings from AP Poll released prior to the game; All times are in Eastern time
