= 1969 Boston University Terriers football team =

American college football season

1969 Boston University Terriers football

Pasadena Bowl, L 7–28 vs. San Diego State
- Conference: Independent
- Record: 9–2
- Head coach: Larry Naviaux (1st season)
- Home stadium: Nickerson Field

1969 NCAA College Division independents football records
	Conf.			Overall
Team	W	L	T	W		L		T
No. 3 Akron		–		9	–	1	–	0
Indiana (PA)		–		8	–	1	–	0
Boston University		–		9	–	2	–	0
No. 9 Tampa		–		8	–	2	–	0
Tennessee State		–		7	–	1	–	1
Colorado College		–		6	–	2	–	0
Drake		–		7	–	2	–	2
Northern Arizona		–		7	–	3	–	0
Illinois College		–		5	–	2	–	1
Mankato State		–		6	–	3	–	0
Hawaii		–		6	–	3	–	1
Indiana State		–		6	–	3	–	1
Ashland		–		5	–	3	–	1
Lincoln (MO)		–		5	–	3	–	1
Portland State		–		6	–	4	–	0
Santa Clara		–		6	–	4	–	0
UNLV		–		6	–	4	–	0
Eastern Michigan		–		5	–	4	–	0
St. Norbert		–		5	–	4	–	0
Cortland		–		4	–	4	–	0
Northern Michigan		–		5	–	5	–	0
Nevada		–		5	–	5	–	0
Rose Poly		–		4	–	4	–	0
Southern Illinois		–		5	–	5	–	0
Wayne State (MI)		–		4	–	4	–	0
Chattanooga		–		4	–	6	–	0
Chicago		–		2	–	4	–	0
Milwaukee		–		3	–	6	–	0
Northeastern		–		3	–	6	–	0
Wabash		–		3	–	6	–	0
Wheaton (IL)		–		3	–	6	–	0
Samford		–		2	–	6	–	1
Lake Forest		–		2	–	6	–	0
Parsons		–		2	–	8	–	0
Kentucky State		–		0	–	8	–	0
Rankings from AP small college poll

The 1969 Boston University Terriers football team was an American football team that represented Boston University as an independent during the 1969 NCAA College Division football season. The Terriers compiled a 9–2 record and outscored opponents by a total of 233 to 131.

Larry Naviaux was the team's head coach. Naviaux played college football at Nebraska and had also been an assistant football coach at Boston University. He was named as the head coach in July 1969 after former head coach Warren Schmakel was promoted to assistant athletic director.

Defensive back Bruce Taylor won the George Bulger Lowe Award as the best senior football player in New England. He later played eight years for the San Francisco 49ers and was inducted into the College Football Hall of Fame in 1997.

Guard Steve Bogner and linebacker Pat Hughes were selected by the Associated Press as second-team on the 1969 All-East football team. Bruce Taylor was placed on the first team.

The team played its home games at Nickerson Field in Boston.

== Schedule ==
Date	Opponent	Site	Result	Attendance	Source
September 20	at Colgate	Andy Kerr Stadium; Hamilton, NY	W 20–0	5,000	
September 27	Vermont	Nickerson Field; Boston, MA	W 27–7	6,200–8,500	
October 4	at Harvard	Harvard Stadium; Boston, MA	W 13–10	26,000	
October 11	UMass	Nickerson Field; Boston, MA	L 9–14	9,772–10,000	
October 18	at Lafayette	Fisher Field; Easton, PA	W 22–14	7,000–9,000	
October 25	Maine	Nickerson Field; Boston, MA	W 20–7	5,500–8,000	
November 1	Connecticut	Nickerson Field; Boston, MA	W 37–21	7,775–8,000	
November 8	Rhode Island	Nickerson Field; Boston, MA	W 27–13	5,240–5,500	
November 15	No. 3 Delaware	Nickerson Field; Boston, MA	W 30–14	9,246–9,500	
November 22	at Temple	Temple Stadium; Philadelphia, PA	W 21–3	3,500–5,000	
December 6	vs. San Diego State	Rose Bowl; Pasadena, CA (Pasadena Bowl)	L 7–28	41,276	
Rankings from AP Poll released prior to the game
