= 1969 Tampa Spartans football team =

American college football season

1969 Tampa Spartans football
- Conference: Independent
- Record: 8–2
- Head coach: Fran Curci (2nd season)
- Home stadium: Tampa Stadium

1969 NCAA College Division independents football records
	Conf.			Overall
Team	W	L	T	W		L		T
No. 3 Akron		–		9	–	1	–	0
Indiana (PA)		–		8	–	1	–	0
Boston University		–		9	–	2	–	0
No. 9 Tampa		–		8	–	2	–	0
Tennessee State		–		7	–	1	–	1
Colorado College		–		6	–	2	–	0
Drake		–		7	–	2	–	2
Northern Arizona		–		7	–	3	–	0
Mankato State		–		6	–	3	–	0
Hawaii		–		6	–	3	–	1
Indiana State		–		6	–	3	–	1
Ashland		–		5	–	3	–	1
Lincoln (MO)		–		5	–	3	–	1
Portland State		–		6	–	4	–	0
Santa Clara		–		6	–	4	–	0
UNLV		–		6	–	4	–	0
Eastern Michigan		–		5	–	4	–	0
St. Norbert		–		5	–	4	–	0
Cortland		–		4	–	4	–	0
Northern Michigan		–		5	–	5	–	0
Nevada		–		5	–	5	–	0
Rose Poly		–		4	–	4	–	0
Southern Illinois		–		5	–	5	–	0
Wayne State (MI)		–		4	–	4	–	0
Chattanooga		–		4	–	6	–	0
Chicago		–		2	–	4	–	0
Milwaukee		–		3	–	6	–	0
Northeastern		–		3	–	6	–	0
Wabash		–		3	–	6	–	0
Wheaton (IL)		–		3	–	6	–	0
Samford		–		2	–	6	–	1
Lake Forest		–		2	–	6	–	0
Parsons		–		2	–	8	–	0
Kentucky State		–		0	–	8	–	0
Rankings from AP small college poll

The 1969 Tampa Spartans football team represented the University of Tampa in the 1969 NCAA College Division football season. It was the Spartans' 33rd season. The team was led by head coach Fran Curci, in his second year, and played their home games at Tampa Stadium in Tampa, Florida. They finished with a record of eight wins and two losses (8–2). The Spartans opened the season with a loss at Akron before they went on an eight-game winning streak. They then closed the season with a loss against Florida A&M in the season finale.

== Schedule ==
Date	Opponent	Site	Result	Attendance	Source
September 20	at Akron	Rubber Bowl; Akron, OH	L 0–40	42,869	
September 27	Parsons	Tampa Stadium; Tampa, FL	W 51–0	15,251	
October 4	at Southern Illinois	McAndrew Stadium; Carbondale, IL	W 31–0	9,000	
October 11	Tulsa	Tampa Stadium; Tampa, FL	W 31–14	20,179	
October 18	Oshkosh State	Tampa Stadium; Tampa, FL	W 56–0	12,600	
October 25	at Eastern Michigan	Rynearson Stadium; Ypsilanti, MI	W 17–7	17,600	
November 1	Quantico Marines	Tampa Stadium; Tampa, FL	W 45–19	17,865	
November 15	Northern Michigan^{†}	Tampa Stadium; Tampa, FL	W 39–35	16,248	
November 22	Cal State Los Angeles	Tampa Stadium; Tampa, FL	W 53–0	10,352	
November 29	Florida A&M	Tampa Stadium; Tampa, FL	L 28–34	46,477	
^{†}Homecoming
