= 1969 Chattanooga Moccasins football team =

American college football season

1969 Chattanooga Moccasins football
- Conference: Independent
- Record: 4–6
- Head coach: Harold Wilkes (2nd season)
- Home stadium: Chamberlain Field

1969 NCAA College Division independents football records
	Conf.			Overall
Team	W	L	T	W		L		T
No. 3 Akron		–		9	–	1	–	0
Indiana (PA)		–		8	–	1	–	0
Boston University		–		9	–	2	–	0
No. 9 Tampa		–		8	–	2	–	0
Tennessee State		–		7	–	1	–	1
Colorado College		–		6	–	2	–	0
Drake		–		7	–	2	–	2
Northern Arizona		–		7	–	3	–	0
Mankato State		–		6	–	3	–	0
Hawaii		–		6	–	3	–	1
Indiana State		–		6	–	3	–	1
Ashland		–		5	–	3	–	1
Lincoln (MO)		–		5	–	3	–	1
Portland State		–		6	–	4	–	0
Santa Clara		–		6	–	4	–	0
UNLV		–		6	–	4	–	0
Eastern Michigan		–		5	–	4	–	0
St. Norbert		–		5	–	4	–	0
Cortland		–		4	–	4	–	0
Northern Michigan		–		5	–	5	–	0
Nevada		–		5	–	5	–	0
Rose Poly		–		4	–	4	–	0
Southern Illinois		–		5	–	5	–	0
Wayne State (MI)		–		4	–	4	–	0
Chattanooga		–		4	–	6	–	0
Chicago		–		2	–	4	–	0
Milwaukee		–		3	–	6	–	0
Northeastern		–		3	–	6	–	0
Wabash		–		3	–	6	–	0
Wheaton (IL)		–		3	–	6	–	0
Samford		–		2	–	6	–	1
Lake Forest		–		2	–	6	–	0
Parsons		–		2	–	8	–	0
Kentucky State		–		0	–	8	–	0
Rankings from AP small college poll

The 1969 Chattanooga Moccasins football team was an American football team that represented the University of Tennessee at Chattanooga during the 1969 NCAA College Division football season. In their second year under head coach Harold Wilkes, the team compiled a 4–6 record.

== Schedule ==
Date	Opponent	Site	Result	Attendance	Source
September 20	at Tennessee	Neyland Stadium; Knoxville, TN	L 0–31	48,942	
September 27	Wofford	Chamberlain Field; Chattanooga, TN	W 28–23		
October 4	at Middle Tennessee	Horace Jones Field; Murfreesboro, TN	W 7–3	9,000	
October 11	at Northeast Louisiana	Brown Stadium; Monroe, LA	W 12–7	6,500	
October 18	No. 10 East Tennessee State^{†}	Chamberlain Field; Chattanooga, TN	L 13–17		
October 25	No. 11 Louisiana Tech	Chamberlain Field; Chattanooga, TN	L 7–55	5,000	
November 1	Tennessee Tech	Chamberlain Field; Chattanooga, TN	L 7–23		
November 8	at Ole Miss	Hemingway Stadium; Oxford, MS	L 0–21	15,200	
November 15	Troy State	Chamberlain Field; Chattanooga, TN	L 6–31		
November 21	at The Citadel	Johnson Hagood Stadium; Charleston, SC	W 10–5	8,450	
^{†}Homecoming; Rankings from AP Poll released prior to the game
