= 1969 UNLV Rebels football team =

American college football season

1969 UNLV Rebels football
- Conference: Independent
- Record: 6–4
- Head coach: Bill Ireland (2nd season)
- Home stadium: Cashman Field

1969 NCAA College Division independents football records
| | Conf. | | | Overall |
| Team | W | L | T | W | | L | | T |
|---|---|---|---|---|---|---|---|---|
| No. 3 Akron | | – | | 9 | – | 1 | – | 0 |
| Indiana (PA) | | – | | 8 | – | 1 | – | 0 |
| Boston University | | – | | 9 | – | 2 | – | 0 |
| No. 9 Tampa | | – | | 8 | – | 2 | – | 0 |
| Tennessee State | | – | | 7 | – | 1 | – | 1 |
| Colorado College | | – | | 6 | – | 2 | – | 0 |
| Drake | | – | | 7 | – | 2 | – | 2 |
| Northern Arizona | | – | | 7 | – | 3 | – | 0 |
| Mankato State | | – | | 6 | – | 3 | – | 0 |
| Hawaii | | – | | 6 | – | 3 | – | 1 |
| Indiana State | | – | | 6 | – | 3 | – | 1 |
| Ashland | | – | | 5 | – | 3 | – | 1 |
| Lincoln (MO) | | – | | 5 | – | 3 | – | 1 |
| Portland State | | – | | 6 | – | 4 | – | 0 |
| Santa Clara | | – | | 6 | – | 4 | – | 0 |
| UNLV | | – | | 6 | – | 4 | – | 0 |
| Eastern Michigan | | – | | 5 | – | 4 | – | 0 |
| St. Norbert | | – | | 5 | – | 4 | – | 0 |
| Cortland | | – | | 4 | – | 4 | – | 0 |
| Northern Michigan | | – | | 5 | – | 5 | – | 0 |
| Nevada | | – | | 5 | – | 5 | – | 0 |
| Rose Poly | | – | | 4 | – | 4 | – | 0 |
| Southern Illinois | | – | | 5 | – | 5 | – | 0 |
| Wayne State (MI) | | – | | 4 | – | 4 | – | 0 |
| Chattanooga | | – | | 4 | – | 6 | – | 0 |
| Chicago | | – | | 2 | – | 4 | – | 0 |
| Milwaukee | | – | | 3 | – | 6 | – | 0 |
| Northeastern | | – | | 3 | – | 6 | – | 0 |
| Wabash | | – | | 3 | – | 6 | – | 0 |
| Wheaton (IL) | | – | | 3 | – | 6 | – | 0 |
| Samford | | – | | 2 | – | 6 | – | 1 |
| Lake Forest | | – | | 2 | – | 6 | – | 0 |
| Parsons | | – | | 2 | – | 8 | – | 0 |
| Kentucky State | | – | | 0 | – | 8 | – | 0 |
Rankings from AP small college poll

The 1969 UNLV Rebels football team was an American football team that represented the University of Nevada, Las Vegas as an independent during the 1969 NCAA College Division football season. In their second year under head coach Bill Ireland, the team compiled a record of 6–4.

== Schedule ==
| Date | Opponent | Site | Result | Attendance | Source |
|---|---|---|---|---|---|
| September 20 | Cal Lutheran | Cashman Field; Las Vegas, NV | L 0–26 | | |
| September 27 | La Verne | Cashman Field; Las Vegas, NV | W 39–26 | | |
| October 4 | at Southern Utah | Eccles Coliseum; Cedar City, UT | W 30–12 | | |
| October 11 | Santa Clara | Cashman Field; Las Vegas, NV | L 13–26 | | |
| October 18 | at Azusa Pacific | Cougar Athletic Stadium; Azusa, CA | W 35–13 | | |
| October 25 | at Hawaii | Honolulu Stadium; Honolulu, HI | L 19–57 | 15,965 | |
| November 1 | UC Riverside | Cashman Field; Las Vegas, NV | W 36–6 | 2,000 | |
| November 8 | Idaho State | Cashman Field; Las Vegas, NV | W 35–31 | | |
| November 15 | Hiram Scott | Cashman Field; Las Vegas, NV | W 36–28 | | |
| November 22 | at Nevada | Mackay Stadium; Reno, NV (rivalry) | L 28–30 | | |
