= 1969 Hawaii Rainbows football team =

American college football season

1969 Hawaii Rainbows football
- Conference: Independent
- Record: 6–3–1
- Head coach: Dave Holmes (2nd season)
- Home stadium: Honolulu Stadium

1969 NCAA College Division independents football records
	Conf.			Overall
Team	W	L	T	W		L		T
No. 3 Akron		–		9	–	1	–	0
Indiana (PA)		–		8	–	1	–	0
Boston University		–		9	–	2	–	0
No. 9 Tampa		–		8	–	2	–	0
Tennessee State		–		7	–	1	–	1
Colorado College		–		6	–	2	–	0
Drake		–		7	–	2	–	2
Northern Arizona		–		7	–	3	–	0
Mankato State		–		6	–	3	–	0
Hawaii		–		6	–	3	–	1
Indiana State		–		6	–	3	–	1
Ashland		–		5	–	3	–	1
Lincoln (MO)		–		5	–	3	–	1
Portland State		–		6	–	4	–	0
Santa Clara		–		6	–	4	–	0
UNLV		–		6	–	4	–	0
Eastern Michigan		–		5	–	4	–	0
St. Norbert		–		5	–	4	–	0
Cortland		–		4	–	4	–	0
Northern Michigan		–		5	–	5	–	0
Nevada		–		5	–	5	–	0
Rose Poly		–		4	–	4	–	0
Southern Illinois		–		5	–	5	–	0
Wayne State (MI)		–		4	–	4	–	0
Chattanooga		–		4	–	6	–	0
Chicago		–		2	–	4	–	0
Milwaukee		–		3	–	6	–	0
Northeastern		–		3	–	6	–	0
Wabash		–		3	–	6	–	0
Wheaton (IL)		–		3	–	6	–	0
Samford		–		2	–	6	–	1
Lake Forest		–		2	–	6	–	0
Parsons		–		2	–	8	–	0
Kentucky State		–		0	–	8	–	0
Rankings from AP small college poll

The 1969 Hawaii Rainbows football team represented the University of Hawaiʻi at Mānoa as an independent during the 1969 NCAA College Division football season. In their second season under head coach Dave Holmes, the Rainbows compiled a 6–3–1 record.

== Schedule ==
Date	Opponent	Site	Result	Attendance	Source
September 20	New Mexico Highlands	Honolulu Stadium; Honolulu, HI	T 16–16	21,447	
September 27	Central Washington	Honolulu Stadium; Honolulu, HI	W 38–6	14,840	
October 4	at Puget Sound	Baker Stadium; Tacoma, WA	W 30–20	7,000	
October 11	Long Beach State	Honolulu Stadium; Honolulu, HI	L 14–28	11,515	
October 18	at Santa Clara	Buck Shaw Stadium; Santa Clara, CA	W 33–26	7,133	
October 25	UNLV^{†}	Honolulu Stadium; Honolulu, HI	W 57–19	15,965	
November 1	Cal State Los Angeles	Honolulu Stadium; Honolulu, HI	W 52–28	20,223	
November 15	Linfield	Honolulu Stadium; Honolulu, HI	W 41–14	13,282	
November 22	UC Santa Barbara	Honolulu Stadium; Honolulu, HI	L 16–21	15,290	
November 29	Oregon	Honolulu Stadium; Honolulu, HI	L 16–57	21,717	
^{†}Homecoming
