= 1969 Nevada Wolf Pack football team =

American college football season

1969 Nevada Wolf Pack football
- Conference: Independent
- Record: 5–5
- Head coach: Jerry Scattini (1st season)
- Home stadium: Mackay Stadium

1969 NCAA College Division independents football records
	Conf.			Overall
Team	W	L	T	W		L		T
No. 3 Akron		–		9	–	1	–	0
Indiana (PA)		–		8	–	1	–	0
Boston University		–		9	–	2	–	0
No. 9 Tampa		–		8	–	2	–	0
Tennessee State		–		7	–	1	–	1
Colorado College		–		6	–	2	–	0
Drake		–		7	–	2	–	2
Northern Arizona		–		7	–	3	–	0
Mankato State		–		6	–	3	–	0
Hawaii		–		6	–	3	–	1
Indiana State		–		6	–	3	–	1
Ashland		–		5	–	3	–	1
Lincoln (MO)		–		5	–	3	–	1
Portland State		–		6	–	4	–	0
Santa Clara		–		6	–	4	–	0
UNLV		–		6	–	4	–	0
Eastern Michigan		–		5	–	4	–	0
St. Norbert		–		5	–	4	–	0
Cortland		–		4	–	4	–	0
Northern Michigan		–		5	–	5	–	0
Nevada		–		5	–	5	–	0
Rose Poly		–		4	–	4	–	0
Southern Illinois		–		5	–	5	–	0
Wayne State (MI)		–		4	–	4	–	0
Chattanooga		–		4	–	6	–	0
Chicago		–		2	–	4	–	0
Milwaukee		–		3	–	6	–	0
Northeastern		–		3	–	6	–	0
Wabash		–		3	–	6	–	0
Wheaton (IL)		–		3	–	6	–	0
Samford		–		2	–	6	–	1
Lake Forest		–		2	–	6	–	0
Parsons		–		2	–	8	–	0
Kentucky State		–		0	–	8	–	0
Rankings from AP small college poll

The 1969 Nevada Wolf Pack football team represented the University of Nevada, Reno as an independent during the 1969 NCAA College Division football season. Led by first-year head coach Jerry Scattini, the Wolf Pack compiled a record of 5–5. The team played home games at Mackay Stadium in Reno, Nevada.

== Schedule ==
Date	Opponent	Site	Result	Attendance	Source
September 21	Willamette	Mackay Stadium; Reno, NV	W 27–7	4,500	
September 27	at UC Santa Barbara	Campus Stadium; Santa Barbara, CA	L 6–21	4,500–6,000	
October 4	Chico State	Mackay Stadium; Reno, NV	L 15–27	3,500–5,500	
October 11	Cal State Hayward	Mackay Stadium; Reno, NV	W 31–21	2,500–2,800	
October 18	at Sacramento State	Hornet Stadium; Sacramento, CA	L 7–41	3,550	
October 25	at Humboldt State	Redwood Bowl; Arcata, CA	L 0–34	8,000–10,000	
November 1	UC Davis	Mackay Stadium; Reno, NV	W 30–12	2,000	
November 8	at San Francisco State	Cox Stadium; San Francisco, CA	L 26–27	1,000	
November 15	at San Francisco	Kezar Stadium; San Francisco, CA	W 50–7		
November 22	UNLV^{†}	Mackay Stadium; Reno, NV (rivalry)	W 30–28		
^{†}Homecoming
