= 1969 Tennessee State Tigers football team =

American college football season

1969 Tennessee State Tigers football
- Conference: Independent
- Record: 7–1–1
- Head coach: John Merritt (7th season)
- Home stadium: Hale Stadium

1969 NCAA College Division independents football records
	Conf.			Overall
Team	W	L	T	W		L		T
No. 3 Akron		–		9	–	1	–	0
Indiana (PA)		–		8	–	1	–	0
Boston University		–		9	–	2	–	0
No. 9 Tampa		–		8	–	2	–	0
Tennessee State		–		7	–	1	–	1
Colorado College		–		6	–	2	–	0
Drake		–		7	–	2	–	2
Northern Arizona		–		7	–	3	–	0
Mankato State		–		6	–	3	–	0
Hawaii		–		6	–	3	–	1
Indiana State		–		6	–	3	–	1
Ashland		–		5	–	3	–	1
Lincoln (MO)		–		5	–	3	–	1
Portland State		–		6	–	4	–	0
Santa Clara		–		6	–	4	–	0
UNLV		–		6	–	4	–	0
Eastern Michigan		–		5	–	4	–	0
St. Norbert		–		5	–	4	–	0
Cortland		–		4	–	4	–	0
Northern Michigan		–		5	–	5	–	0
Nevada		–		5	–	5	–	0
Rose Poly		–		4	–	4	–	0
Southern Illinois		–		5	–	5	–	0
Wayne State (MI)		–		4	–	4	–	0
Chattanooga		–		4	–	6	–	0
Chicago		–		2	–	4	–	0
Milwaukee		–		3	–	6	–	0
Northeastern		–		3	–	6	–	0
Wabash		–		3	–	6	–	0
Wheaton (IL)		–		3	–	6	–	0
Samford		–		2	–	6	–	1
Lake Forest		–		2	–	6	–	0
Parsons		–		2	–	8	–	0
Kentucky State		–		0	–	8	–	0
Rankings from AP small college poll

The 1969 Tennessee State Tigers football team represented Tennessee State University as an independent during the 1969 NCAA College Division football season. Led by seventh-year head coach John Merritt, the Tigers compiled a 7–1–1 record.

== Schedule ==
Date	Opponent	Rank	Site	Result	Attendance	Source
September 20	at Kentucky State		Alumni Field; Frankfort, KY	W 40–0	3,000	
September 27	Albany State	No. 10	Hale Stadium; Nashville, TN	W 42–7	6,140	
October 4	at Texas Southern		Rice Stadium; Houston, TX	T 26–26	13,000	
October 11	Grambling		Hale Stadium; Nashville, TN	W 34–20	7,667	
October 25	Florida A&M		Hale Stadium; Nashville, TN	W 33–20	19,181	
November 1	at Southern	No. 18	University Stadium; Baton Rouge, LA	L 22–30	13,000	
November 8	at Morris Brown		Herndon Stadium; Atlanta, GA	W 48–17	11,000	
November 22	at Bishop		Cotton Bowl; Dallas, TX	W 49–14	12,000	
November 27	Parsons		Hale Stadium; Nashville, TN	W 41–13	7,000	
Rankings from AP Poll released prior to the game
