= 1969 Northern Arizona Lumberjacks football team =

American college football season

1969 Northern Arizona Lumberjacks football
- Conference: Independent
- Record: 7–3
- Head coach: John Symank (1st season)
- Defensive coordinator: C. O. Brocato (1st season)
- Home stadium: Lumberjack Stadium

1969 NCAA College Division independents football records
	Conf.			Overall
Team	W	L	T	W		L		T
No. 3 Akron		–		9	–	1	–	0
Indiana (PA)		–		8	–	1	–	0
Boston University		–		9	–	2	–	0
No. 9 Tampa		–		8	–	2	–	0
Tennessee State		–		7	–	1	–	1
Colorado College		–		6	–	2	–	0
Drake		–		7	–	2	–	2
Northern Arizona		–		7	–	3	–	0
Illinois College		–		5	–	2	–	1
Mankato State		–		6	–	3	–	0
Hawaii		–		6	–	3	–	1
Indiana State		–		6	–	3	–	1
Ashland		–		5	–	3	–	1
Lincoln (MO)		–		5	–	3	–	1
Portland State		–		6	–	4	–	0
Santa Clara		–		6	–	4	–	0
UNLV		–		6	–	4	–	0
Eastern Michigan		–		5	–	4	–	0
St. Norbert		–		5	–	4	–	0
Cortland		–		4	–	4	–	0
Northern Michigan		–		5	–	5	–	0
Nevada		–		5	–	5	–	0
Rose Poly		–		4	–	4	–	0
Southern Illinois		–		5	–	5	–	0
Wayne State (MI)		–		4	–	4	–	0
Chattanooga		–		4	–	6	–	0
Chicago		–		2	–	4	–	0
Milwaukee		–		3	–	6	–	0
Northeastern		–		3	–	6	–	0
Wabash		–		3	–	6	–	0
Wheaton (IL)		–		3	–	6	–	0
Samford		–		2	–	6	–	1
Lake Forest		–		2	–	6	–	0
Parsons		–		2	–	8	–	0
Kentucky State		–		0	–	8	–	0
Rankings from AP small college poll

The 1969 Northern Arizona Lumberjacks football team was an American football team that represented Northern Arizona University (NAU) as an independent during the 1969 NCAA College Division football season. In their first year under head coach John Symank, the Lumberjacks compiled a 7–3 record and outscored opponents by a total of 284 to 182.

The team played its home games at Lumberjack Stadium in Flagstaff, Arizona.

== Schedule ==
Date	Opponent	Rank	Site	Result	Attendance	Source
September 13	Cal Poly Pomona		Lumberjack Stadium; Flagstaff, AZ	W 38–7	6,350	
September 20	at West Texas State		Buffalo Bowl; Canyon, TX	W 21–20	16,000	
September 27	at Montana	No. 4	Dornblaser Field; Missoula, MT	L 7–52	10,500	
October 4	Montana State^{†}	No. 8	Lumberjack Stadium; Flagstaff, AZ	W 35–0	7,900–8,000	
October 11	at Cal State Los Angeles	No. 11	Rose Bowl; Pasadena, CA	W 20–14	1,147–3,000	
October 18	at Long Beach State	No. 13	Veterans Memorial Stadium; Long Beach, CA	L 15–23	6,000	
October 25	Whitworth	No. 17	Lumberjack Stadium; Flagstaff, AZ	W 61–0	5,300	
November 1	at Weber State	No. 14	Wildcat Stadium; Ogden, UT	W 21–19	6,159	
November 8	Eastern New Mexico	No. 12	Lumberjack Stadium; Flagstaff, AZ	W 48–20	8,150	
November 15	at Fresno State	No. 9	Ratcliffe Stadium; Fresno, CA	L 18–27	6,341	
^{†}Homecoming; Rankings from AP Poll released prior to the game
