= Joe Williams (running back, born 1947) =

American football player (born 1947)

No. 36, 24
- Position: Running back

Personal information
- Born: March 30, 1947 (age 79); Center, Texas, U.S.
- Listed height: 6 ft 0 in (1.83 m)
- Listed weight: 193 lb (88 kg)

Career information
- High school: Dunbar (TX)
- College: Wyoming
- NFL draft: 1970: 12th round, 309th overall pick

Career history
- Dallas Cowboys (1970–1971); New Orleans Saints (1972); Los Angeles Rams (1973)*
- * Offseason or practice squad member only

Awards and highlights
- Super Bowl champion (VI)

Career NFL statistics
- Games played: 26
- Games started: 3
- Rushing yards: 139
- Rushing attempts: 52
- Touchdowns: 1
- Receiving yards: 175
- Stats at Pro Football Reference

Joseph Harold Williams (born March 30, 1947) is an American former professional football player who was a running back in the National Football League (NFL) for the Dallas Cowboys and New Orleans Saints. He played college football for the Wyoming Cowboys.

== Early life ==
Born in Center, Texas, Williams attended Dunbar High School, where he helped the football team achieve a 26–3 record. He accepted a football scholarship from the University of Wyoming under head coach Lloyd Eaton.

In his sophomore season in 1967, he backed up senior halfback Jim Kiick and rushed for 389 yards. Wyoming won all ten games in the regular season and was invited to the Sugar Bowl in New Orleans on New Year's Day. They led favored LSU at halftime, but lost by seven points.

As a junior in 1968, Williams rushed for 596 yards and three touchdowns in ten games as the Cowboys won their third consecutive conference title.

As a senior tri-captain in 1969, he was one of the fourteen African American players that were dismissed from the team after requesting to wear black armbands during a game against BYU, to protest the racial policies of the Church of Jesus Christ of Latter-day Saints. He played in only the first four games, rushing for 258 yards and one touchdown, and finished his college career with 1,190 rushing yards, 147 receiving yards and 5 touchdowns.

At the time of the incident (known as the "Black 14"), the Cowboys were undefeated (4–0) and ranked 16th in the AP poll. The potential unconstitutional decision was withdrawn the next week, but the players were not reinstated. Though Wyoming beat BYU 40–7 and San Jose State the next game without the players to go to 6–0, they lost all four road games in November and went 1–9 the next year, which prompted the school to reassign head coach Lloyd Eaton to assistant athletic director. The incident also affected the University to successfully recruit African American players for several years, with the football team posting only one winning season during the 1970s. None of the players was able to transfer to another major college football program, which has been speculated in the media that it was because of the incident. Three of the players (John Griffin, Don Meadows and Ted Williams) came back to play for Eaton in the 1970 season. At least 3 other players (Tony McGee, Ron Hill and Jerry Berry ) transferred to predominantly African-American colleges.

== Professional career ==
=== Dallas Cowboys ===
Williams was selected by the Dallas Cowboys in the twelfth round (309th overall) of the 1970 NFL draft, after dropping because of the perception left from the "Black 14" incident. As a rookie, he was used sparingly and spent most of his time on the taxi squad; the Cowboys won the NFC title but lost Super Bowl V.

He earned a Super Bowl ring in his second season as a member of the Super Bowl VI-winning team under coach Tom Landry. A few weeks later on January 31, 1972, he was traded to the New Orleans Saints in exchange for a fourth round draft choice (#83-Tim Kearney).

=== New Orleans Saints ===
In 1972, he played in 14 games (3 starts), posting 72 rushing yards and 116 passing yards. He was waived on June 19, 1973.

=== Los Angeles Rams ===
On June 19, 1973, he was claimed him off waivers by the Los Angeles Rams. He was released before the start of the season on August 29.
