= 1969 Valley State Matadors football team =

American college football season

1969 Valley State Matadors football
- Conference: California Collegiate Athletic Association
- Record: 4–5 (1–1 CCAA)
- Head coach: Leon McLaughlin (1st season)
- Home stadium: Birmingham High School

1969 California Collegiate Athletic Association football standings
	Conf.					Overall
Team	W		L		T	W		L		T
Cal Poly $	2	–	0	–	0	6	–	4	–	0
Valley State	1	–	1	–	0	4	–	5	–	0
Cal Poly Pomona	1	–	2	–	0	2	–	8	–	0
UC Riverside	0	–	1	–	0	3	–	6	–	0
$ – Conference champion

The 1969 Valley State Matadors football team represented San Fernando Valley State College—now known as California State University, Northridge—as a member of the California Collegiate Athletic Association (CCAA) during the 1969 NCAA College Division football season. Led by first-year head coach Leon McLaughlin, Valley State compiled an overall record of 4–5 with a mark of 1–1 in conference play, placing second in the CCAA. The Matadors played home games at Birmingham High School in Van Nuys, California.

CCAA football changed significantly in 1969. Three teams—Fresno State, Long Beach State, and Cal State Los Angeles—left the conference and moved up to NCAA University Division competition, joining in the newly-formed Pacific Coast Athletic Association. They were replaced by Cal Poly Pomona and UC Riverside.

== Schedule ==
Date	Opponent	Site	Result	Attendance	Source
September 28	at Sacramento State*	Hornet Stadium; Sacramento, CA	W 28–24	5,100	
October 4	at Long Beach State*	Veterans Stadium; Long Beach, CA	W 32–21		
October 11	Fresno State*	Birmingham High School; Van Nuys, CA	L 14–38	5,200	
October 18	at UC Santa Barbara*	Campus Stadium; Santa Barbara, CA	L 2–26	6,000	
October 25	Cal Poly	Birmingham High School; Van Nuys, CA	L 19–28	6,200	
November 8	Cal Poly Pomona	Birmingham High School; Van Nuys, CA	W 48–13	3,500	
November 15	New Mexico Highlands*	Birmingham High School; Van Nuys, CA	L 19–23	2,000	
November 22	at No. 14 Cal State Hayward*	Pioneer Stadium; Hayward, CA	L 17–25	2,800–5,000	
November 29	at Cal State Los Angeles*	Rose Bowl; Pasadena, CA	W 47–6	1,371–2,000	
*Non-conference game; Rankings from UPI Poll released prior to the game

== Team players in the NFL ==
No Valley State players were selected in the 1970 NFL draft.

The following finished their college career in 1969, were not drafted, but played in the NFL.

Player	Position	First NFL team
Bill Butler	LB	1970 Denver Broncos
