= 1969 UC Riverside Highlanders football team =

American college football season

1969 UC Riverside Highlanders football
- Conference: California Collegiate Athletic Association
- Record: 3–6 (0–1 CCAA)
- Head coach: Pete Kettela (5th season)
- Home stadium: Highlander Stadium

1969 California Collegiate Athletic Association football standings
	Conf.					Overall
Team	W		L		T	W		L		T
Cal Poly $	2	–	0	–	0	6	–	4	–	0
Valley State	1	–	1	–	0	4	–	5	–	0
Cal Poly Pomona	1	–	2	–	0	2	–	8	–	0
UC Riverside	0	–	1	–	0	3	–	6	–	0
$ – Conference champion

The 1969 UC Riverside Highlanders football team represented the University of California, Riverside as a member of the California Collegiate Athletic Association (CCAA) during the 1969 NCAA College Division football season. Led by Pete Kettela in his fifth and final season as head coach, UC Riverside compiled an overall record of 3–6 with a mark of record of 0–1 in conference play, placing last out of four teams in the CCAA. The team was outscored by its opponents 203 to 163 for the season. The Highlanders played home games at Highlander Stadium in Riverside, California.

CCAA football changed significantly in 1969. Three teams—Fresno State, Long Beach State, and Cal State Los Angeles—left the conference and moved up to NCAA University Division competition, joining in the newly-formed Pacific Coast Athletic Association. They were replaced by Cal Poly Pomona and UC Riverside.

Kettela finished his tenure at UC Riverside with an overall record of 24–20–2, for a .543 winning percentage.

== Schedule ==
Date	Opponent	Site	Result	Attendance	Source
September 20	La Verne*	Highlander Stadium; Riverside, CA	L 17–21	2,000	
September 27	at San Francisco*	Kezar Stadium; San Francisco, CA	L 6–22	2,500	
October 4	at Occidental*	D. W. Patterson Field; Los Angeles, CA	W 20–17	1,500	
October 18	at Redlands*	Redlands Stadium; Redlands, CA	L 22–25	3,000–4,000	
October 25	at Cal Poly Pomona	Kellogg Field; Pomona, CA	L 6–7	2,000–3,000	
November 1	at UNLV*	Las Vegas Stadium; Whitney, NV	L 6–36	2,000	
November 8	at Saint Mary's*	Moraga, CA	W 23–13	1,000–2,000	
November 15	United States International*	Highlander Stadium; Riverside, CA	W 29–28	2,500–3,500	
November 22	UC Davis*	Highlander Stadium; Riverside, CA	L 34–35	1,200–3,500	
*Non-conference game
