= Tony McGee =

Tony McGee may refer to:

- Tony McGee (defensive lineman) (born 1949)
- Tony McGee (tight end) (born 1971)
