= Doug Scovil =

American football player and coach (1927–1989)

Biographical details
- Born: July 1, 1927; Anacortes, Washington, U.S.
- Died: December 9, 1989 (aged 62); Philadelphia, Pennsylvania, U.S.

Playing career
- 1948: Stockton
- 1949–1951: Pacific (CA)
- Position: Quarterback

Coaching career (HC unless noted)
- 1954–1957: Sacred Heart Cathedral Prep (CA)
- 1958–1962: San Mateo
- 1963–1965: Navy (QB)
- 1966–1969: Pacific (CA)
- 1970: San Francisco 49ers (ST)
- 1971–1975: San Francisco 49ers (QB)
- 1976–1977: BYU (QB/OC)
- 1978: Chicago Bears (WR)
- 1979–1980: BYU (QB/OC)
- 1981–1985: San Diego State
- 1986–1989: Philadelphia Eagles (QB)

Head coaching record
- Overall: 45–51–3 (college); 32–7–5 (junior college)
- Bowls: 1—0 (junior college)

Accomplishments and honors

Championships
- 3 Big Eight (CA) (1958, 1960–1961)

Douglas Henry Scovil (July 1, 1927 – December 9, 1989) was an American football player and coach. He served as the head football coach at the University of the Pacific in Stockton, California from 1966 to 1969 and at San Diego State University from 1981 to 1985, compiling a career college football record of 45–51–3. Following his stint as head coach for the San Diego State Aztecs, Scovil worked as the quarterbacks coach for the Philadelphia Eagles of the National Football League (NFL), where he was credited with developing Randall Cunningham, until his death from a heart attack at Veterans Stadium during the 1989 season. In memory of Scovil's passing, the Eagles marked their helmets with black electrical tape for the rest of the season.

Scovil's coaching stops included the College of San Mateo, the United States Naval Academy, Brigham Young University (BYU), and the San Francisco 49ers of the NFL. While serving as quarterbacks coach at BYU, Scovil mentored future NFL quarterbacks Gifford Nielsen, Marc Wilson, and Jim McMahon.

Scovil played at Stockton Junior College and at the University of the Pacific.

== Head coaching record ==
=== College ===
| Year | Team | Overall | Conference | Standing | Bowl/playoffs |
|---|---|---|---|---|---|
Pacific Tigers (NCAA University Division independent) (1966)
| 1966 | Pacific | 4–7 | | | |
Pacific Tigers (NCAA College Division independent) (1967)
| 1967 | Pacific | 4–5 | | | |
Pacific Tigers (NCAA University Division independent) (1966–1968)
| 1968 | Pacific | 6–4 | | | |
Pacific Tigers (Pacific Coast Athletic Association) (1969)
| 1969 | Pacific | 7–3 | 2–2 | 3rd | |
| Pacific: | | 21–19 | 2–2 | | |
San Diego State Aztecs (Western Athletic Conference) (1981–1985)
| 1981 | San Diego State | 6–5 | 3–5 | 7th | |
| 1982 | San Diego State | 7–5 | 4–3 | T–3rd | |
| 1983 | San Diego State | 2–9–1 | 1–6–1 | 8th | |
| 1984 | San Diego State | 4–7–1 | 4–3–1 | T–4th | |
| 1985 | San Diego State | 5–6–1 | 3–4–1 | 6th | |
| San Diego State: | | 24–32–3 | 15–21–3 | | |
| Total: | | 45–51–3 | | | |

=== Junior college ===
| Year | Team | Overall | Conference | Standing | Bowl/playoffs |
|---|---|---|---|---|---|
San Mateo Bulldogs (Big Eight Conference) (1958–1961)
| 1958 | San Mateo | 7–2 | 5–2 | T–1st | |
| 1959 | San Mateo | 4–1–2 | 4–1–2 | T–2nd | |
| 1960 | San Mateo | 6–1–2 | 5–0–2 | 1st | |
| 1961 | San Mateo | 9–1 | 7–0 | 1st | W Prune Bowl |
San Mateo Bulldogs (Golden Gate Conference) (1962)
| 1962 | San Mateo | 6–2–1 | 4–2–1 | 3rd | |
| San Mateo: | | 32–7–5 | 25–5–5 | | |
| Total: | | 32–7–5 | | | |
National championship Conference title Conference division title or championship game berth
