= 1969 Wyoming Cowboys football team =

American college football season

1969 Wyoming Cowboys football
- Conference: Western Athletic Conference
- Record: 6–4 (4–3 WAC)
- Head coach: Lloyd Eaton (8th season)
- Captains: Larry Nels; Tommy Tucker
- Home stadium: War Memorial Stadium

1969 Western Athletic Conference football standings
	Conf.					Overall
Team	W		L		T	W		L		T
Arizona State $	6	–	1	–	0	8	–	2	–	0
Utah	5	–	1	–	0	8	–	2	–	0
BYU	4	–	3	–	0	6	–	4	–	0
Wyoming	4	–	3	–	0	6	–	4	–	0
Arizona	3	–	3	–	0	3	–	7	–	0
UTEP	2	–	5	–	0	4	–	6	–	0
New Mexico	1	–	5	–	0	4	–	6	–	0
Colorado State	0	–	4	–	0	4	–	6	–	0
$ – Conference champion

The 1969 Wyoming Cowboys football team represented the University of Wyoming in the 1969 NCAA University Division football season. Led by eighth-year head coach Lloyd Eaton, they were members of the Western Athletic Conference (WAC) and played their home games on campus at War Memorial Stadium in Laramie.

The Cowboys were three-time defending conference champions. They compiled a record of 6–4 (4–3 against conference opponents), finished fourth in the WAC, and outscored their opponents 242 to 118. Wyoming won its first six games, but lost the last four in a season tainted by a racial controversy.

== Schedule ==
Date	Time	Opponent	Rank	Site	Result	Attendance	Source
September 20		Arizona		War Memorial Stadium; Laramie, WY	W 23–7	20,400	
September 27	1:30 p.m.	at Air Force*		Falcon Stadium; Colorado Springs, CO	W 27–25	33,290	
October 4		Colorado State	No. 19	War Memorial Stadium; Laramie, WY (rivalry)	W 39–3	15,140	
October 11		UTEP	No. 18	War Memorial Stadium; Laramie, WY	W 37–9	11,463	
October 18		BYU	No. 16	War Memorial Stadium; Laramie, WY	W 40–7	14,993	
October 25		San Jose State*^{†}	No. 16	War Memorial Stadium; Laramie, WY	W 16–7	18,791	
November 1		at Arizona State	No. 15	Sun Devil Stadium; Tempe, AZ	L 14–30	48,000	
November 8		at Utah		Rice Stadium; Salt Lake City, UT	L 10–34	29,416	
November 15		at New Mexico		University Stadium; Albuquerque, NM	L 12–24	12,806	
November 22		at No. 19 Houston*		Houston Astrodome; Houston, TX	L 14–41	35,389	
*Non-conference game; ^{†}Homecoming; Rankings from AP Poll released prior to the game; All times are in Mountain time

== Roster ==
1969 Wyoming Cowboys football team roster
Players
Coaches
Offense

Pos.	#	Name	Class
G	73	Conrad Dobler	So
QB	10	Ed Synakowski	Jr
RB	26	Joe Williams	Sr

Defense

Pos.	#	Name	Class
DE	88	Tony McGee	Jr

Special teams

Pos.	#	Name	Class

Head coach

- Lloyd Eaton

Coordinators/assistant coaches

Legend

- (C) Team captain
- (S) Suspended
- (I) Ineligible
- Injured
- Redshirt

== "Black 14" controversy ==
During the season in mid-October, head coach Eaton dismissed 14 black players from the team for asking to wear black armbands during the upcoming home game against the Brigham Young University (BYU) Cougars. At the previous year's win over BYU at Provo, some players claimed that Cougar players had subjected them to racial epithets. A week before the game, the team's black members were reminded of the incident and also informed about the racial policies of the Church of Jesus Christ of Latter-day Saints (which owns and operates BYU, and which at that time excluded black people from the priesthood of the LDS Church) by Willie Black, leader of Wyoming's Black Student Alliance, and challenged them to do something about it.

The day before the game, the players donned black armbands on their civilian clothes and went to Eaton's office to discuss how they might show solidarity with the BSA protest. Upon seeing them with the armbands the coach immediately dismissed them from the team. According to Joe Williams, a team co-captain before he was suspended from the team, "We wanted to see if we could wear black armbands in the game, or black socks, or black X's on our helmets. And if he had said no we had already agreed that we would be willing to protest with nothing but our black skins."

Eaton took them to the bleachers in Memorial Fieldhouse, and said he listened to their suggestions for ten minutes before deciding to release them. Williams gives a very different account: "He [Eaton] came in, sneered at us and yelled that we were off the squad. He said our very presence defied him. He said he has had some good Neeegro boys. Just like that." Defensive end Tony McGee said that Eaton "said we could go to Grambling State or Morgan State... We could go back to colored relief. If anyone said anything, he told us to shut up. We were really protesting policies we thought were racist." John Griffin, a flanker, corroborates McGee's memory. Tony Gibson agreed with the other players that Eaton kicked them off the team before they could even present a case. At the time, Wyoming fans and much of the state backed Eaton and his "no protesting" policy, and saw the Black 14 as insubordinate and ungrateful.

At San Jose State University, the Spartans were petitioned in a letter by a UW student group to boycott the homecoming game in Laramie; San Jose voted to play the game and wear multicolored armbands in support of the 14. Groups at other WAC schools demanded that Wyoming be dropped from their schedules. At the time of the incident in mid-October, the Cowboys were undefeated (4–0) and ranked 16th in the AP poll. Even though they beat BYU 40–7, and San Jose State (the next game) without the players to improve to 6–0, Wyoming lost all four road games in November and went 1–9 the next year which prompted Eaton's removal as coach, though he stayed on as assistant athletic director. The program had only one winning season in the 1970s, in 1976 under second-year head coach Fred Akers, who left after the Fiesta Bowl, returning to the University of Texas to succeed Darrell Royal.

The Black 14 included Earl Lee, John Griffin, Willie Hysaw, Don Meadows, Ivie Moore, Tony Gibson, Jerome Berry, Joe Williams, Mel Hamilton, Jim Issac, Tony McGee, Ted Williams, Lionel Grimes, and Ron Hill. Three of the underclassmen returned to play for the Cowboys in 1970: Griffin, Meadows, and Ted Williams. McGee transferred to Bishop College in Dallas, Texas, was a third round selection in the 1971 NFL draft, and played fourteen seasons for three NFL teams (Chicago Bears, New England Patriots and Washington Redskins).

The Black 14 incident spurred the court case Williams v. Eaton, with the issue of free speech against the principle of separation of church and state. Litigation was lengthy for this case and ended on October 31, 1972.

In 2019, the fiftieth anniversary of the Black 14 being dismissed, the University of Wyoming invited the surviving players back and made several amends. The eight players that returned were invited to speak to history classes and meet with student athletes; attend a special dinner with university officials and receive an official apology letter signed by President Laurie Nichols; and were given both Wyoming football jerseys and Wyoming letterman jackets.

The Black 14 were the recipients of the 2023 NCAA Inspiration Award.

== NFL draft ==
Three Cowboys were selected in the 1970 NFL draft, which lasted seventeen rounds (442 selections).

Player	Position	Round	Overall	Franchise
Vic Washington	Wide receiver	4	87	San Francisco 49ers
Larry Nels	Defensive lineman	12	298	New York Giants
Joe Williams	Running back	12	309	Dallas Cowboys

- Defensive end Tony McGee was selected in the third round of the 1971 NFL draft and played for 14 seasons.
- List of Wyoming Cowboys in the NFL draft
