= 1969 Cal Poly Mustangs football team =

American college football season

1969 Cal Poly Mustangs football

CCAA champion
- Conference: California Collegiate Athletic Association
- Record: 6–4 (2–0 CCAA)
- Head coach: Joe Harper (2nd season)
- Home stadium: Mustang Stadium

1969 California Collegiate Athletic Association football standings
	Conf.					Overall
Team	W		L		T	W		L		T
Cal Poly $	2	–	0	–	0	6	–	4	–	0
Valley State	1	–	1	–	0	4	–	5	–	0
Cal Poly Pomona	1	–	2	–	0	2	–	8	–	0
UC Riverside	0	–	1	–	0	3	–	6	–	0
$ – Conference champion

The 1969 Cal Poly Mustangs football team represented California Polytechnic State College—now known as California Polytechnic State University, San Luis Obispo—as a member of the California Collegiate Athletic Association (CCAA) during the 1969 NCAA College Division football season. Led by first-year head coach Joe Harper, Cal Poly compiled an overall record of 6–4 with a mark of 2–0 in conference play, winning the CCAA title and beginning a streak of five consecutive CCAA championships. The Mustangs played home games at Mustang Stadium in San Luis Obispo, California.

CCAA football changed significantly in 1969. Three teams—Fresno State, Long Beach State, and Cal State Los Angeles—left the conference and moved up to NCAA University Division competition, joining in the newly formed Pacific Coast Athletic Association. They were replaced by Cal Poly Pomona and UC Riverside. Cal State Fullerton joined in 1970. Cal Poly Pomona had joined the CCAA in 1967, but its football team was not considered a conference member since they did not play a full slate of conference games in 1967 or 1968.

== Schedule ==
Date	Opponent	Site	Result	Attendance	Source
September 20	at San Francisco State*	Cox Stadium; San Francisco, CA	W 71–7	1,500	
September 27	Western Washington*	Mustang Stadium; San Luis Obispo, CA	W 44–0	7,000	
October 4	Boise State*	Mustang Stadium; San Luis Obispo, CA	L 7–17	7,000	
October 11	Simon Fraser*	Mustang Stadium; San Luis Obispo, CA	W 74–7	5,200	
October 18	Fresno State*	Mustang Stadium; San Luis Obispo, CA	W 21–17	7,800	
October 25	at Valley State	Birmingham High School; Van Nuys, CA	W 28–19	6,200	
November 1	Long Beach State*	Mustang Stadium; San Luis Obispo, CA	L 20–22	6,700	
November 8	at No. 2 Montana*	Dornblaser Field; Missoula, MT	L 0–14	7,500–9,000	
November 15	UC Santa Barbara*	Mustang Stadium; San Luis Obispo, CA	L 7–9	5,100	
November 22	Cal Poly Pomona	Mustang Stadium; San Luis Obispo, CA	W 34–6	4,000	
*Non-conference game; Rankings from AP Poll released prior to the game

== Team players in the NFL ==
The following Cal Poly Mustangs were selected in the 1970 NFL draft.

Player	Position	Round	Overall	NFL team
Emanuel Murrell	Defensive back	12	305	Detroit Lions
