= 1969 Fresno State Bulldogs football team =

American college football season

1969 Fresno State Bulldogs football
- Conference: Pacific Coast Athletic Association
- Record: 6–4 (1–3 CCAA)
- Head coach: Darryl Rogers (4th season)
- Defensive coordinator: Bob Padilla (2nd season)
- Home stadium: Ratcliffe Stadium

1969 Pacific Coast Athletic Association football standings
	Conf.					Overall
Team	W		L		T	W		L		T
San Diego State $	6	–	0	–	0	11	–	0	–	0
Long Beach State	3	–	1	–	0	8	–	3	–	0
Pacific (CA)	2	–	2	–	0	7	–	3	–	0
San Jose State	1	–	1	–	0	2	–	8	–	0
UC Santa Barbara	1	–	3	–	0	6	–	4	–	0
Fresno State	1	–	3	–	0	6	–	4	–	0
Cal State Los Angeles	0	–	4	–	0	0	–	9	–	0
$ – Conference champion

The 1969 Fresno State Bulldogs football team represented Fresno State College—now known as California State University, Fresno—as a member of the Pacific Coast Athletic Association (PCAA) during the 1969 NCAA University Division football season. Led by fourth-year head coach Darryl Rogers, the Bulldogs compiled an overall record of 6–4 with a mark of 1–3 in conference play, tying for fifth place in the PCAA. This was Fresno State's first year competing at the NCAA University Division level and the inaugural season for the PCAA. The Bulldogs played their home games at Ratcliffe Stadium on the campus of Fresno City College in Fresno, California.

== Schedule ==
Date	Time	Opponent	Site	Result	Attendance	Source
September 20		Cal Poly Pomona*	Ratcliffe Stadium; Fresno, CA	W 27–7	9,500	
September 27		at No. 17 Montana State*	Gatton Field; Bozeman, MT	W 28–20	7,500	
October 4	8:00 p.m.	at Pacific (CA)	Pacific Memorial Stadium; Stockton, CA	L 21–40	15,211	
October 11		at Valley State*	Birmingham High School; Van Nuys, CA	W 38–14	5,200	
October 18		at Cal Poly*	Mustang Stadium; San Luis Obispo, CA	L 17–21	7,800	
October 25		Cal State Los Angeles	Ratcliffe Stadium; Fresno, CA	W 24–0	9,303	
November 1		San Diego State	Ratcliffe Stadium; Fresno, CA (rivalry)	L 20–48	9,501	
November 8		at Long Beach State	Veterans Stadium; Long Beach, CA	L 7–37	6,000	
November 15		No. 9 Northern Arizona*	Ratcliffe Stadium; Fresno, CA	W 27–18	6,341	
November 22		Portland State*	Ratcliffe Stadium; Fresno, CA	W 28–22	6,000	
*Non-conference game; Rankings from AP Poll released prior to the game; All times are in Pacific time

== Team players in the NFL ==
The following were selected in the 1970 NFL draft.

Player	Position	Round	Overall	NFL team
Ervin Hunt	Defensive back	6	145	Green Bay Packers
