= 1969 Cal Poly Pomona Broncos football team =

American college football season

1969 Cal Poly Pomona Broncos football
- Conference: California Collegiate Athletic Association
- Record: 2–8 (1–2 CCAA)
- Head coach: Roy Anderson (1st season)
- Home stadium: Kellogg Field

1969 California Collegiate Athletic Association football standings
	Conf.					Overall
Team	W		L		T	W		L		T
Cal Poly $	2	–	0	–	0	6	–	4	–	0
Valley State	1	–	1	–	0	4	–	5	–	0
Cal Poly Pomona	1	–	2	–	0	2	–	8	–	0
UC Riverside	0	–	1	–	0	3	–	6	–	0
$ – Conference champion

The 1969 Cal Poly Pomona Broncos football team represented California State Polytechnic College, Kellogg-Voorhis—now known as California State Polytechnic University, Pomona—as a member of the California Collegiate Athletic Association (CCAA) during the 1969 NCAA College Division football season. Led by first-year head coach Roy Anderson, Cal Poly Pomona compiled an overall record of 2–8 with a mark of 1–2 in conference play, placing third in the CCAA. The team was outscored by its opponents 287 to 110 for the season. The Broncos played home games at Kellogg Field in Pomona, California.

CCAA football changed significantly in 1969. Three teams—Fresno State, Long Beach State, and Cal State Los Angeles—left the conference and moved up to NCAA University Division competition, joining in the newly-formed Pacific Coast Athletic Association. They were replaced by Cal Poly Pomona and UC Riverside. Cal State Fullerton joined in 1970. Cal Poly Pomona had joined the CCAA in 1967, but its football team was not considered a conference member since they did not play a full slate of conference games in 1967 or 1968.

== Schedule ==
Date	Opponent	Site	Result	Attendance	Source
September 13	at Northern Arizona*	Lumberjack Stadium; Flagstaff, AZ	L 7–38	6,350	
September 20	at Fresno State*	Ratcliffe Stadium; Fresno, CA	L 7–27	7,874–9,500	
September 27	No. 12 Sacramento State*	Kellogg Field; Pomona, CA	L 9–28	1,500	
October 4	Cal State Los Angeles*	Kellogg Field; Pomona, CA	W 14–13	1,500–3,000	
October 11	Redlands	Kellogg Field; Pomona, CA	L 12–25	1,500	
October 18	at UC Davis	Toomey Field; Davis, CA	L 13–45	3,200	
October 25	UC Riverside*	Kellogg Field; Pomona, CA	W 7–6	2,000–3,000	
November 1	Whittier*	Kellogg Field; Pomona, CA	L 22–23	1,500–3,000	
November 8	at Valley State	Birmingham High School; Van Nuys, CA	L 13–48	3,500	
November 22	at Cal Poly	Mustang Stadium; San Luis Obispo, CA	L 6–34	4,000	
*Non-conference game; Rankings from AP Poll released prior to the game
