= 1969 San Diego State Aztecs football team =

American college football season

1969 San Diego State Aztecs football

PCAA champion

Pasadena Bowl, W 28–7 vs. Boston University
- Conference: Pacific Coast Athletic Association

Ranking
- Coaches: No. 18
- Record: 11–0 (6–0 PCAA)
- Head coach: Don Coryell (9th season)
- Offensive coordinator: Rod Dowhower (2nd season)
- Offensive scheme: Air Coryell
- Defensive coordinator: Claude Gilbert (1st season)
- Base defense: 4–3
- Home stadium: San Diego Stadium

1969 Pacific Coast Athletic Association football standings
	Conf.					Overall
Team	W		L		T	W		L		T
San Diego State $	6	–	0	–	0	11	–	0	–	0
Long Beach State	3	–	1	–	0	8	–	3	–	0
Pacific (CA)	2	–	2	–	0	7	–	3	–	0
San Jose State	1	–	1	–	0	2	–	8	–	0
UC Santa Barbara	1	–	3	–	0	6	–	4	–	0
Fresno State	1	–	3	–	0	6	–	4	–	0
Cal State Los Angeles	0	–	4	–	0	0	–	9	–	0
$ – Conference champion

The 1969 San Diego State Aztecs football team was an American football team that represented San Diego State College (Note: San Diego State University was known as San Diego State College from 1935 to 1971.) during the 1969 NCAA University Division football season.

This was San Diego State's first year in the University Division and was the inaugural season for the Pacific Coast Athletic Association (PCAA). (Note: The Big West Conference was known as the Pacific Coast Athletic Association from its founding in 1969 through 1987.) The team was led by head coach Don Coryell, in his ninth year, and played home games at San Diego Stadium (Note: San Diego County Credit Union Stadium (SDCCU Stadium) was known as San Diego Stadium from its opening in 1967 through 1980.) in San Diego, California.

They finished the season as conference champion and had a Pasadena Bowl victory over Boston University, 28–7. This third undefeated season under Coryell ended with a record of eleven wins, zero losses (11–0, 6–0 PCAA). The Aztecs were ranked eighteenth in the final UPI Poll.

The team's statistical leaders included Dennis Shaw with 3,185 passing yards, George Brown with 558 rushing yards, and Tim Delaney with 1,259 receiving yards.

== Schedule ==
Date	Time	Opponent	Rank	Site	Result	Attendance	Source
September 27		Cal State Los Angeles		San Diego Stadium; San Diego, CA	W 49–0	38,258	
October 4	8:00 p.m.	at San Jose State		Spartan Stadium; San Jose, CA	W 55–21	9,271	
October 11	6:00 p.m.	at West Texas State*		Buffalo Bowl; Canyon, TX	W 24–14	14,000	
October 18		at UT Arlington*		Memorial Stadium; Arlington, TX	W 27–10	9,500	
October 25		UC Santa Barbara		San Diego Stadium; San Diego, CA	W 53–13	47,605	
November 1		at Fresno State		Ratcliffe Stadium; Fresno, CA (rivalry)	W 48–20	9,501	
November 8	8:04 p.m.	Pacific (CA)		San Diego Stadium; San Diego, CA	W 58–32	48,632	
November 15		New Mexico State*		San Diego Stadium; San Diego, CA	W 70–21	25,827	
November 22	8:00 p.m.	North Texas State*^{†}		San Diego Stadium; San Diego, CA	W 42–24	48,817	
November 29		Long Beach State	No. 18	San Diego Stadium; San Diego, CA	W 36–32	37,425	
December 6		Boston University*	No. 20	Rose Bowl; Pasadena, CA (Pasadena Bowl)	W 28–7	41,276	
*Non-conference game; ^{†}Homecoming; Rankings from UPI Poll released prior to the game; All times are in Pacific time

== Team players in the NFL ==
The following San Diego State players were selected in the 1970 NFL draft.

Player	Position	Round	Overall	NFL team
Dennis Shaw	Quarterback	2	30	Buffalo Bills
Billie Hayes	Defensive back	4	104	Cincinnati Bengals
Lon Woodard	Defensive end	7	166	New Orleans Saints
Bill Pierson	Center	12	306	New York Jets

The following finished their college career in 1969, were not drafted, but played in the NFL.

Player	Position	First NFL team
Carl Weathers	Linebacker	1970 Oakland Raiders

== Team awards ==
Award	Player
Most Valuable Player (John Simcox Memorial Trophy)	Dennis Shaw
Outstanding Offensive & Defensive Linemen (Byron H. Chase Memorial Trophy)	Bill Pierson, Off; Bill Van Leeuwen, Def
Team captains Dr. R. Hardy / C.E. Peterson Memorial Trophy	Dennis Shaw, Off; Tim Burnett, Def
Most Inspirational Player	Tim Delaney
