= 1969 UTEP Miners football team =

American college football season

1969 UTEP Miners football
- Conference: Western Athletic Conference
- Record: 4–6 (2–5 WAC)
- Head coach: Bobby Dobbs (5th season)
- Home stadium: Sun Bowl

1969 Western Athletic Conference football standings
	Conf.					Overall
Team	W		L		T	W		L		T
Arizona State $	6	–	1	–	0	8	–	2	–	0
Utah	5	–	1	–	0	8	–	2	–	0
BYU	4	–	3	–	0	6	–	4	–	0
Wyoming	4	–	3	–	0	6	–	4	–	0
Arizona	3	–	3	–	0	3	–	7	–	0
UTEP	2	–	5	–	0	4	–	6	–	0
New Mexico	1	–	5	–	0	4	–	6	–	0
Colorado State	0	–	4	–	0	4	–	6	–	0
$ – Conference champion

The 1969 UTEP Miners football team was an American football team that represented the University of Texas at El Paso as a member of the Western Athletic Conference (WAC) during the 1969 NCAA University Division football season. In its fifth season under head coach Bobby Dobbs, the team compiled a 4–6 record (2–5 against WAC opponents), finished sixth in the conference, and was outscored by a total of 242 to 158.

== Schedule ==
Date	Time	Opponent	Site	Result	Attendance	Source
September 13	7:30 p.m.	Pacific (CA)*	Sun Bowl; El Paso, TX	W 14–10	22,135	
September 27		at New Mexico	University Stadium; Albuquerque, NM	W 21–6	23,074	
October 4		Utah	Sun Bowl; El Paso, TX	L 6–24	22,470	
October 11		at No. 18 Wyoming	War Memorial Stadium; Laramie, WY	L 9–37	11,463	
October 18		at Arizona	Arizona Stadium; Tucson, AZ	L 10–26	30,000	
October 25		BYU	Sun Bowl; El Paso, TX	L 7–30	19,520	
November 1		at Colorado State	Hughes Stadium; Fort Collins, CO	W 17–16	11,340	
November 8		New Mexico State*	Sun Bowl; El Paso TX (rivalry)	L 38–41	17,772	
November 15		Arizona State^{†}	Sun Bowl; El Paso, TX	L 19–42	16,362	
November 29	2:00 p.m.	Xavier*	Sun Bowl; El Paso, TX	W 17–10	5,100–5,150	
*Non-conference game; ^{†}Homecoming; Rankings from AP Poll released prior to the game; All times are in Mountain time
