= 1969 New Mexico Lobos football team =

American college football season

1969 New Mexico Lobos football
- Conference: Western Athletic Conference
- Record: 4–6 (1–5 WAC)
- Head coach: Rudy Feldman (2nd season)
- Captains: Willie Shaw; Rocky Long
- Home stadium: University Stadium

1969 Western Athletic Conference football standings
	Conf.					Overall
Team	W		L		T	W		L		T
Arizona State $	6	–	1	–	0	8	–	2	–	0
Utah	5	–	1	–	0	8	–	2	–	0
BYU	4	–	3	–	0	6	–	4	–	0
Wyoming	4	–	3	–	0	6	–	4	–	0
Arizona	3	–	3	–	0	3	–	7	–	0
UTEP	2	–	5	–	0	4	–	6	–	0
New Mexico	1	–	5	–	0	4	–	6	–	0
Colorado State	0	–	4	–	0	4	–	6	–	0
$ – Conference champion

The 1969 New Mexico Lobos football team was an American football team that represented the University of New Mexico in the Western Athletic Conference (WAC) during the 1969 NCAA University Division football season. In their second season under head coach Rudy Feldman, the Lobos compiled a 4–6 record (1–5 against WAC opponents) and were outscored, 281 to 171.

Willie Shaw and Rocky Long were the team captains. The team's statistical leaders included Rocky Long with 865 passing yards, Sam Scarber with 534 rushing yards, John Stewart with 391 receiving yards, and David Bookert with 30 points scored.

== Schedule ==
Date	Time	Opponent	Site	Result	Attendance	Source
September 20	12:00 p.m.	at Army*	Michie Stadium; West Point, NY	L 14–31	25,000	
September 27		UTEP	University Stadium; Albuquerque, NM	L 6–21	23,074	
October 4		Kansas*	University Stadium; Albuquerque, NM	W 16–7	13,338	
October 11		at BYU	Cougar Stadium; Provo, UT	L 15–41	25,565	
October 18		Utah	University Stadium; Albuquerque, NM	L 0–24	13,681	
October 25		at Arizona	Arizona Stadium; Tucson, AZ (rivalry)	L 28–52	31,500	
November 1	3:00 p.m.	at San Jose State*	Spartan Stadium; San Jose, CA	W 27–24	9,132	
November 8		Arizona State	University Stadium; Albuquerque, NM	L 17–48	10,903	
November 15		Wyoming^{†}	University Stadium; Albuquerque, NM	W 24–12	12,806	
November 22		at New Mexico State*	Memorial Stadium; Las Cruces, NM (rivalry)	W 24–21	14,078	
*Non-conference game; ^{†}Homecoming; All times are in Mountain time
