= University of Wyoming =

Public university in Laramie, Wyoming, U.S.

- Motto: "Equality"
- Type: Public land-grant research university
- Established: September 27, 1886; 140 years ago
- Accreditation: HLC
- Academic affiliations: Space-grant
- Endowment: $879.5 million (2024)
- President: Shane R. Reeves
- Faculty: 1,002 full-time, 23 part-time
- Administrative staff: 1,846
- Students: 10,813 (fall 2024)
- Undergraduates: 8,130 (fall 2024)
- Postgraduates: 2,683 (fall 2024)
- Location: Laramie, Wyoming, United States; 41°18′47″N 105°34′53″W
- Campus: 2,060 acres (830 ha); Remote town
- Other campuses: Casper
- Newspaper: Branding Iron
- Colors: Brown and gold
- Nickname: Cowboys and Cowgirls
- Sporting affiliations: NCAA Division I FBS – Mountain West; WAC; Big 12
- Mascots: Cowboy Joe (live horse); Pistol Pete
- Website: www.uwyo.edu

The University of Wyoming (UW) is a public land-grant research university in Laramie, Wyoming, United States. It was founded in March 1886, four years before the territory was admitted as the 44th state, and opened in September 1887. The University of Wyoming's location is written into the state's constitution. The university also offers outreach education in communities throughout Wyoming and online.

The University of Wyoming consists of seven colleges: agriculture and natural resources, arts and sciences, business, education, engineering and applied sciences, health sciences, and law. The university offers over 120 undergraduate, graduate, and certificate programs including Doctor of Pharmacy and Juris Doctor. It is classified among "R1: Doctoral Universities – Very High research activity".

In addition to on-campus classes in Laramie, the university's Outreach School offers more than 41 degree, certificate, and endorsement programs to distance learners across the state and beyond. These programs are delivered through the use of technology, such as online and video conferencing classes. The Outreach School has nine regional centers in the state, with several on community college campuses, to give Wyoming residents access to a university education without relocating to Laramie.

== History ==
=== Background ===
The University of Wyoming's origins trace back to the first Wyoming Territorial Legislature on December 10, 1869, when John Allen Campbell, the first governor of the Wyoming Territory, proposed the idea of forming a public university. It was not until 1881 when the first concrete effort of founding a state-supported university was started. Stephen Wheeler Downey, an attorney from Laramie, Wyoming, attempted to gain funding from the family of Oakes and Oliver Ames, who were Union Pacific Railroad magnates. However, his effort was unsuccessful. In 1886, Downey attempted to gain funding through his position in the Wyoming Territorial House of Representatives. Downey was successfully able to have the university funded as a part of the bill authorizing the construction of the Wyoming State Capitol in Cheyenne, Wyoming.

== Campus ==
=== Old Main ===
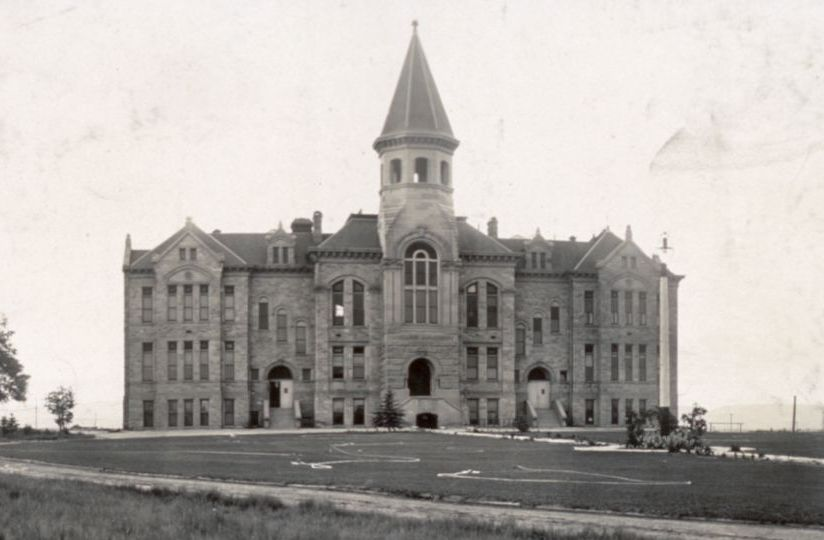
Old Main in 1908

On September 27, 1886, the cornerstone of Old Main was laid, marking the beginning of the University of Wyoming. The stone is inscribed Domi Habuit Unde Disceret, which is often translated, "He need not go away from home for instruction." The following year, the first class of 42 men and women began their college education. For the next decade, the building housed classrooms, a library, and administration offices.

The style of Old Main set a precedent for all future university buildings. The main stone is rough-cut sandstone from a quarry east of Laramie, and the trim stone is smooth Potsdam Sandstone from a quarry near Rawlins. Old Main was supposed to be a monumental structure, and it was designed to be symmetrical, with a prominent central spire as the focal point. The building was also meant to reflect the character of Wyoming, and the rough stone and smooth trim represented the progressing frontier. The design of Old Main had a lasting effect on university structures, most visible in the use of a sandstone façade on nearly every building.

In 1916, the university removed the central spire because of structural concerns. The size of the auditorium was reduced during a 1936 renovation. In 1949, the university thoroughly remodeled the building and completely removed the auditorium and exterior stairs. At that time, it officially became known as Old Main, and the name was carved above the east entrance. Old Main houses university administration, including the president's office and the boardroom where the trustees often meet.

=== Prexy's Pasture ===
In order to preserve the natural and open beauty of that portion of the University of Wyoming campus commonly known and referred to as "Prexy's Pasture", no structures, other than ornamental improvements, or buildings of any kind or type shall be located or constructed upon [that] portion of the campus ...

— Wyoming Legislature Statute

Prexy's Pasture is a large grassy area located within a ring of classroom and administrative buildings and serves as the center mall of the campus. The name is attributed to an obscure rule that the university president, or "prexy", is given exclusive use of the area for livestock grazing. During the administration of Arthur G. Crane, the name "Prexy's Pasture" was formally declared. Prexy's, as it is often called today, is also known for the unique pattern formed by concrete pathways that students and faculty use to cross it.

When the University of Wyoming first opened its doors in 1887, Prexy's Pasture was nothing more than an actual pasture covered in native grasses. The football team played their games there until 1922, when Corbett Field opened at the southeast corner of campus. Over time, as the needs of the university have changed, the area has been altered and redesigned. The original design was established in 1924, and in 1949, the area was landscaped with blue spruce and mugo pine. In February 1965, the board of trustees decided to construct the new science center on the west side of Prexy's Pasture. The board president, Harold F. Newton, who was concerned about the location, leaked the decision to the local press. The uproar that followed caused the board to decide on a new location for the science center and resulted in a new state statute making it necessary for any new structure built on the pasture to receive legislative approval. The statue known as University of Wyoming Family was installed in 1983 by UW professor Robert Russin in anticipation of the centennial celebration.

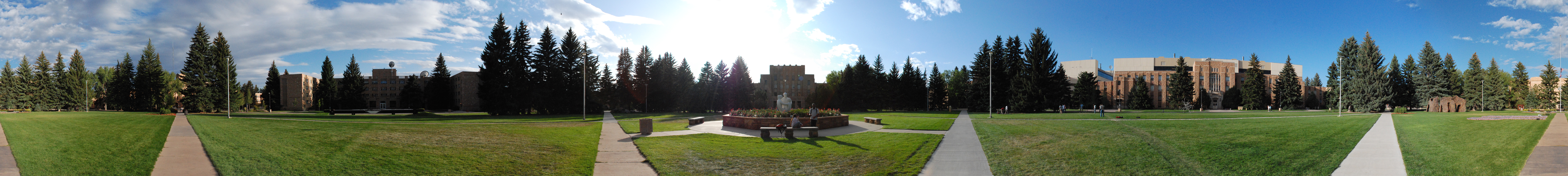
Panorama of Prexy's Pasture at the University of Wyoming

In the summer of 2004, Prexy's Pasture was remodeled as the first step in a two-part redesign project. The first step involved removing the asphalt roadway that circled the pasture and replacing it with concrete walkways to make the area a walking campus, as recommended by the 1966 and 1991 campus master plans. The grassy area was also increased, and new lampposts were installed for better lighting. The second phase of the project involved the construction of a plaza at each corner, featuring trees and rocks styled after the rocky outcrops of nearby Vedauwoo. Two of the plazas, Simpson Plaza and Cheney Plaza, have been completed.

In 2015, several exhibits from the exhibition Sculpture: A Wyoming Invitational were featured along the exterior walkway. In addition to its primary use by students travelling to and from classes or socializing, the area is host to campus barbecues and fall welcome events.

=== Wyoming Union ===
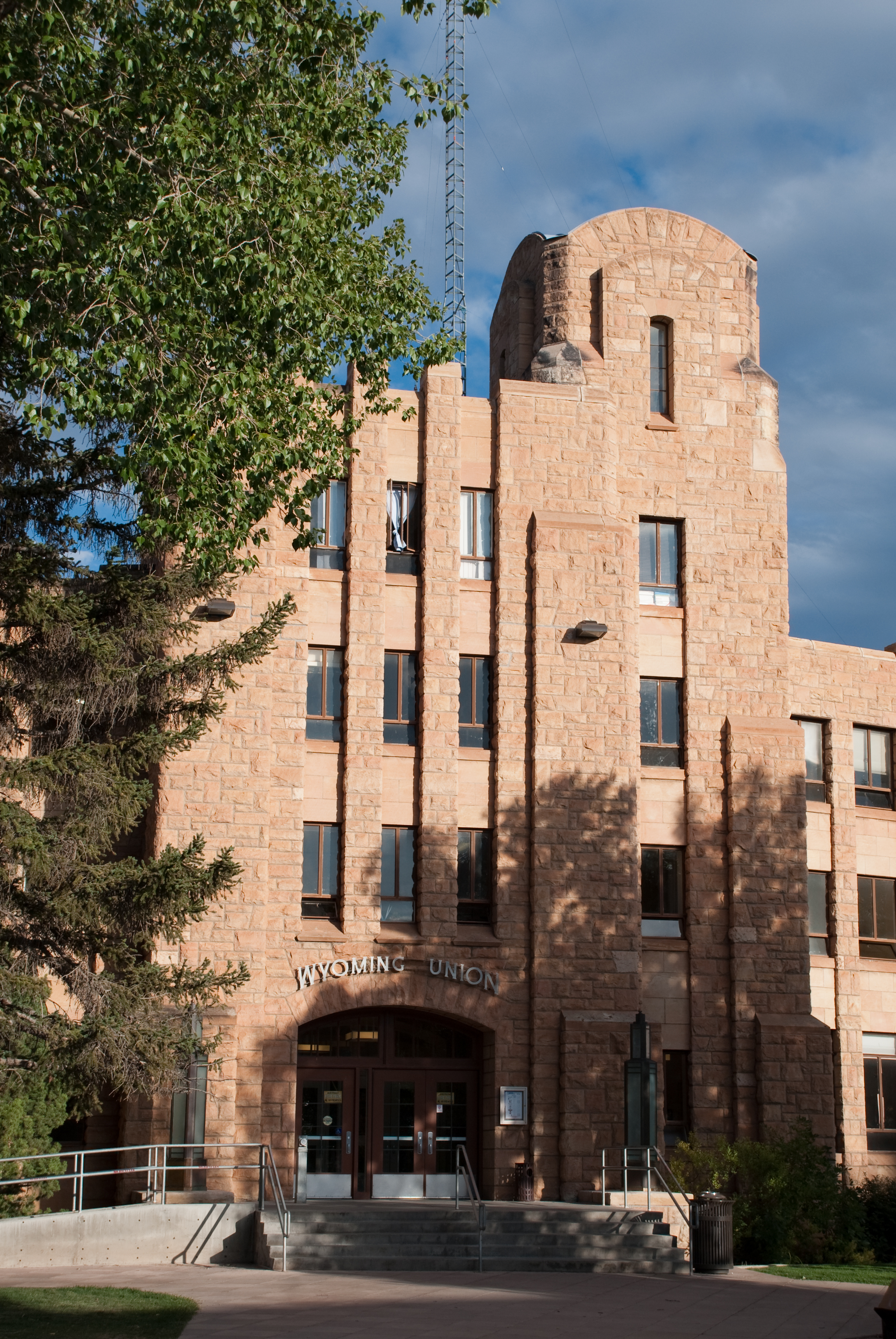
The west entrance of Wyoming Union

In September 1937, the university obtained a Public Works Administration loan during the Great Depression for $149,250 for construction of a student union. On March 3, 1938, ground was broken and construction began on what would become the Wyoming Union. Many students were involved in the construction, and twenty-five students were trained to be stone-cutters.

From the beginning, the union housed an assortment of student needs and activities. The formal and informal social needs were met by including a ballroom, banquet room, lounges, and game rooms. It also contained offices for student government, committees, organizations, and publications, to help meet the political and organizational needs of the student population. Lastly, a student store, post office, and bookstore completed the design.

The original design has been modified several times to accommodate changing needs and a growing student population. The first addition was completed in January 1960. This section, added to the northeast of the original structure, expanded the ballroom, made a lounge area and senate chambers adjacent to the ballroom, created the main lobby and breezeway, and provided a larger food area called The Gardens. In 1973, an addition to the north was completed to make a food court, add more space for the bookstore, and create additional offices. Also, parts of the original building were remodeled to create the Campus Activities Center, an art gallery, and a ticket outlet. In 2000, the Wyoming Union underwent extensive renovation. The $12 million project moved the food court to the main level, expanded the bookstore to the lower level, and revitalized the look and feel of the interior.

=== Ross Hall ===
Ross Hall was built in 1959 and first used as a women's dormitory. In 1975, Ross Hall was converted to academic offices. It is located on the south side of Prexy's Pasture and is named after Nellie Tayloe Ross, Wyoming's and the nation's first woman governor, elected in 1924. There is a brass plaque relief of Nellie Ross in Ross Hall. She was married to William B. Ross, the 12th governor of Wyoming, who died in office. In 2000, on Ross Hall's fourth floor, the university installed the Wyoming Press Association's Newspaper Hall of Fame wall photos. In 2014, the Rendezvous Cafe open in the lobby.

=== Half Acre Gym ===
The Half Acre Gym facility was constructed in 1925 to house the National Guard Armory of Laramie, as well as the athletic programs, until the field house opened in 1951. To fund this project, the university received a $100,000 gift from the Wyoming State Legislature, designated to be used for new buildings, such as a library, the gymnasium and armory, a power plant, an engineering building, and an expansion of the Hoyt Hall dormitory. The original structure occupied half an acre (0.20 ha), hence the name "Half Acre Gym". It was one of the largest facilities of its type at the time.

The building has undergone several renovations to increase its size and structural safety. In 2012, the university announced a $27 million renovation to begin in the Spring of 2013 and be completed by the Fall of 2014. Groathouse Construction, a local construction management firm, carried out the project in two phases to allow maximum use of the facility while it was under construction. Phase One would consist of the demolition and recreation of the east portion of the building. Phase Two would include the reopening of the east portion and the closure and construction of the west portion, which is the historical section of the building. Throughout the renovation, the university hoped to keep and incorporate as much of the historical structure and facade as possible.

The improvements included elevators, added classrooms, a space for athletic training, new racquetball courts, a climbing wall for Bouldering, a dance studio, a jogging/walking track, and new locker rooms with access to the pool.

=== Coe Library ===
The main entrance to Coe Library

The original library at the University of Wyoming consisted of 300 books and was located in Old Main. In 1923, the library was moved to the new Aven Nelson Memorial Building. With the 1950s came a larger student population and a greater push for America to excel academically. These factors contributed to the decision by the board of trustees that it was necessary to construct a new library. However, in 1951, the state legislature rejected the funding request.

William Robertson Coe, a financier and philanthropist, came to the aid of president Humphrey in 1954 by contributing $750,000 in securities to the university. The trustees called the grant "one of the most outstanding contributions that has ever been made to the perpetuation of the American heritage" and assured Coe that the building would be "appropriately named". In 1955, the state legislature matched the Coe grant for an overall amount of $1.5 million.

Laramie architects Eliot and Clinton Hitchcock, whose father had designed the Aven Nelson Memorial Building, teamed up with the Porter and Porter firm in Cheyenne to design the new library. Their modular design was popular at the time and they intended to make the space very functional. The layout provided room for over 500,000 books and seating for at least 900 students. In May 1956, one year after the death of Coe, ground was broken and construction began on the building. The William Robertson Coe Library was finished in time for the Fall 1958 semester. In 1979, the stack tower was completed. This structure, designed by Kellogg and Kellogg of Cheyenne and Rock Springs, Wyoming, almost doubled the shelf space of the original Coe Library.

The most recent renovation of the library was completed in the fall of 2009 and officially dedicated on November 19, 2009. Hinthorne Mott Architects designed the new wing, referred to as Coe East, which added 94,500 square feet (8,780 m^{2}) to the library. The addition was part of a larger, $50 million project to modernize the library by integrating technology and information. The renovation created an additional 20 group study rooms, space for 180 computer terminals, and features art by James Surls.

=== Classroom Building ===
The Classroom Building, dedicated in 1971 at a cost of $1.75 million, was designed to be a general purpose building for the university. The placement and unique design by the local architects W. Eliot and Clinton A. Hitchcock makes it the focal point of the George Duke Humphrey Science Center. The building also contains four interior mosaics, designed by University of Wyoming art professors James Boyle, Joseph Deaderick, Richard Evans, and Victor Flach, that represent the quadrant of Wyoming they face. Each mosaic is over 2,200 square feet (200 m^{2})

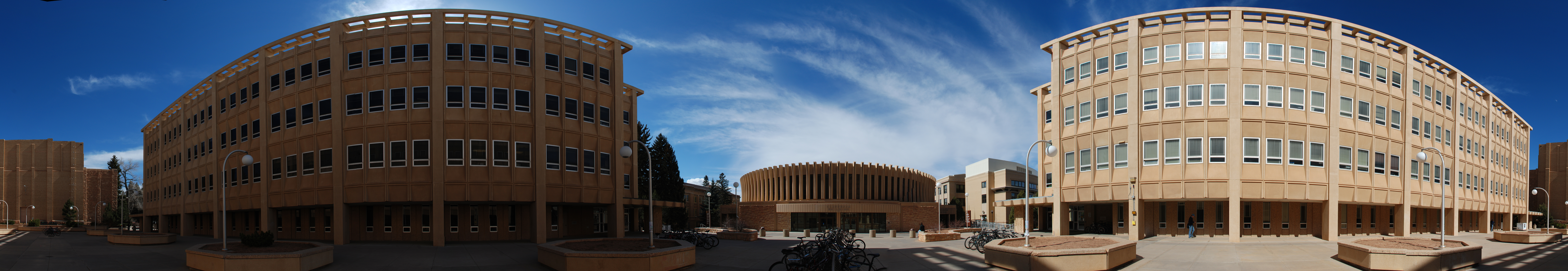
Panorama of George Duke Humphrey Science Center

In 2007, after a two-year, $14.7 million renovation project, the Classroom Building reopened. The goal of the renovation was to incorporate new technology and redesign the seating better to meet the needs of students who carry laptops and backpacks. The building was also retrofitted with air conditioning. The unique characteristics of the original building, such as the circular design and mosaics, were maintained.

=== Berry Biodiversity Conservation Center ===
The Berry Biodiversity Conservation Center was added to the University of Wyoming campus in January 2012. This building, which focuses on the study of biodiversity, is dedicated to Robert and Carol Berry, who gifted it to the University. The cost of the building was $15 million. It has three floors and 40,000 square feet with labs and an auditorium. The Berry Center is home to both the vertebrate museum and the Wyoming Natural Diversity Database (WNDD). There is also an ecology lab, a stable isotope facility, and a program in ecology. The building also faculty offices, a teaching lab, display areas, public meeting areas, and a garden on the roof.

=== Housing ===
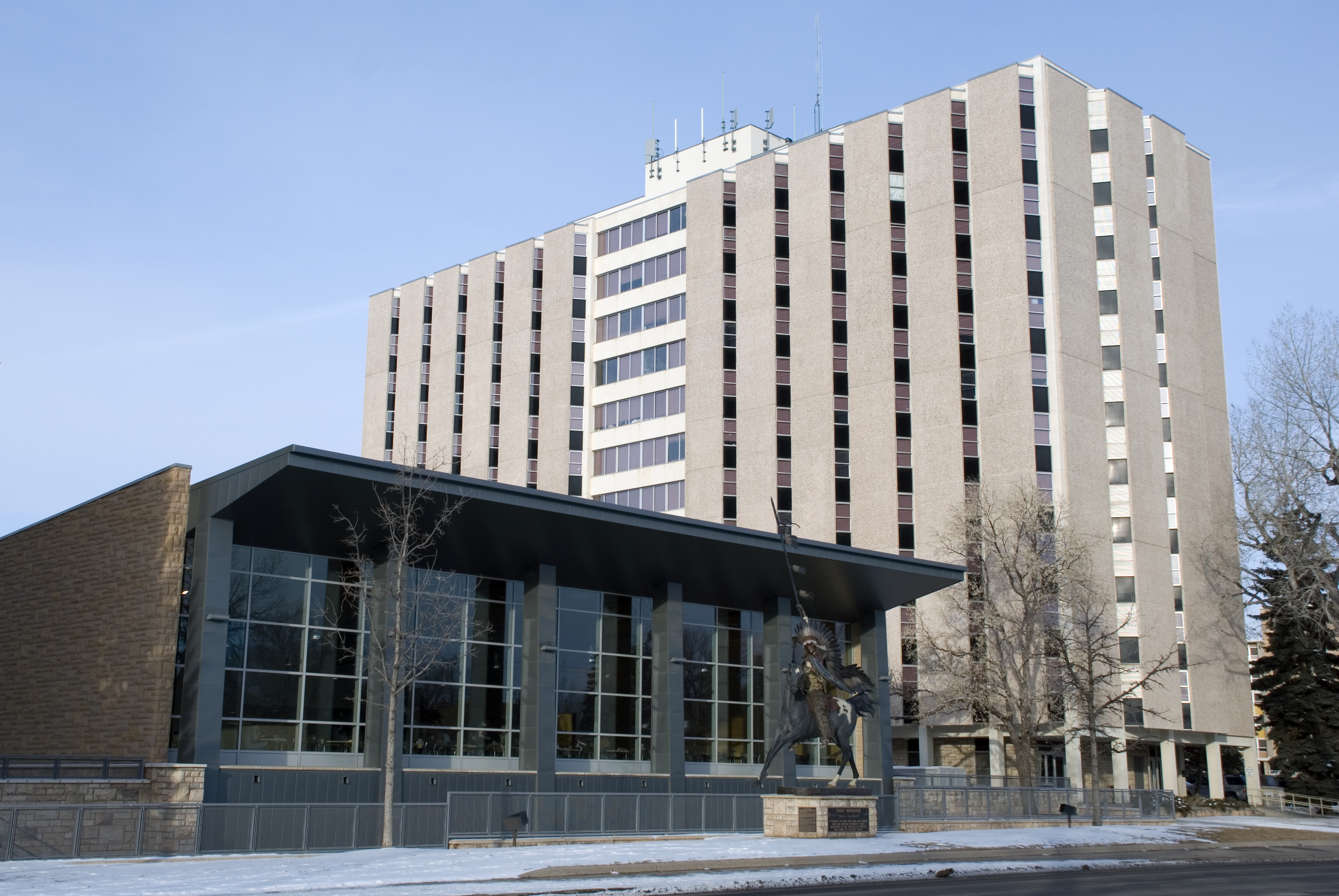
Washakie Dining Center and McIntyre Hall

As of September 2025, the university has six residence halls and four apartment complexes. Four residence halls, Orr, White (the second tallest building in Wyoming), Downey, and McIntyre, are connected together via the Washakie Dining Center, which contains a now closed dining hall and other student services. The two other residence halls are North and South halls which were constructed in 2025 and 2026, respectively. Starting in Fall 2026, Orr Hall will house upperclassmen. Only McIntire, White, North, and South halls currently house students, primarily freshmen. North Hall also contains a dining facility, which replaced Washakie Dining Center. All incoming freshmen are expected to live in the residence halls during their first year, with some exceptions.

Each of the residence halls, other than North and South halls, is named after an influential administrator or faculty member. Downey Hall is an eight-story dormitory located southwest of the Washakie Dining Center and is named after June Downey. Located west of the Washakie Dining Center is White Hall, a dormitory named after Laura Amanda White. At twelve stories and 146 feet, White Hall is the second tallest building in the state of Wyoming, two feet shorter than the Wyoming Financial Center in Cheyenne. McIntyre Hall, named after Clara Frances McIntyre, is located east of the Washakie Dining Center. This twelve-story building underwent extensive renovations in 2004 and 2005. Just northeast of McIntyre Hall is the eight-story Orr Hall, named after Harriet Knight Orr. From 2005 to 2006, Orr Hall also underwent extensive renovations to modernize its living space.

The University Apartments are located east of War Memorial Stadium. They are available on a first-come, first-serve basis to all University of Wyoming students above freshman standing. There are apartment units in a variety of layouts in the River Village, Bison Run, Landmark, and Spanish Walk apartment complexes.

=== Museums ===
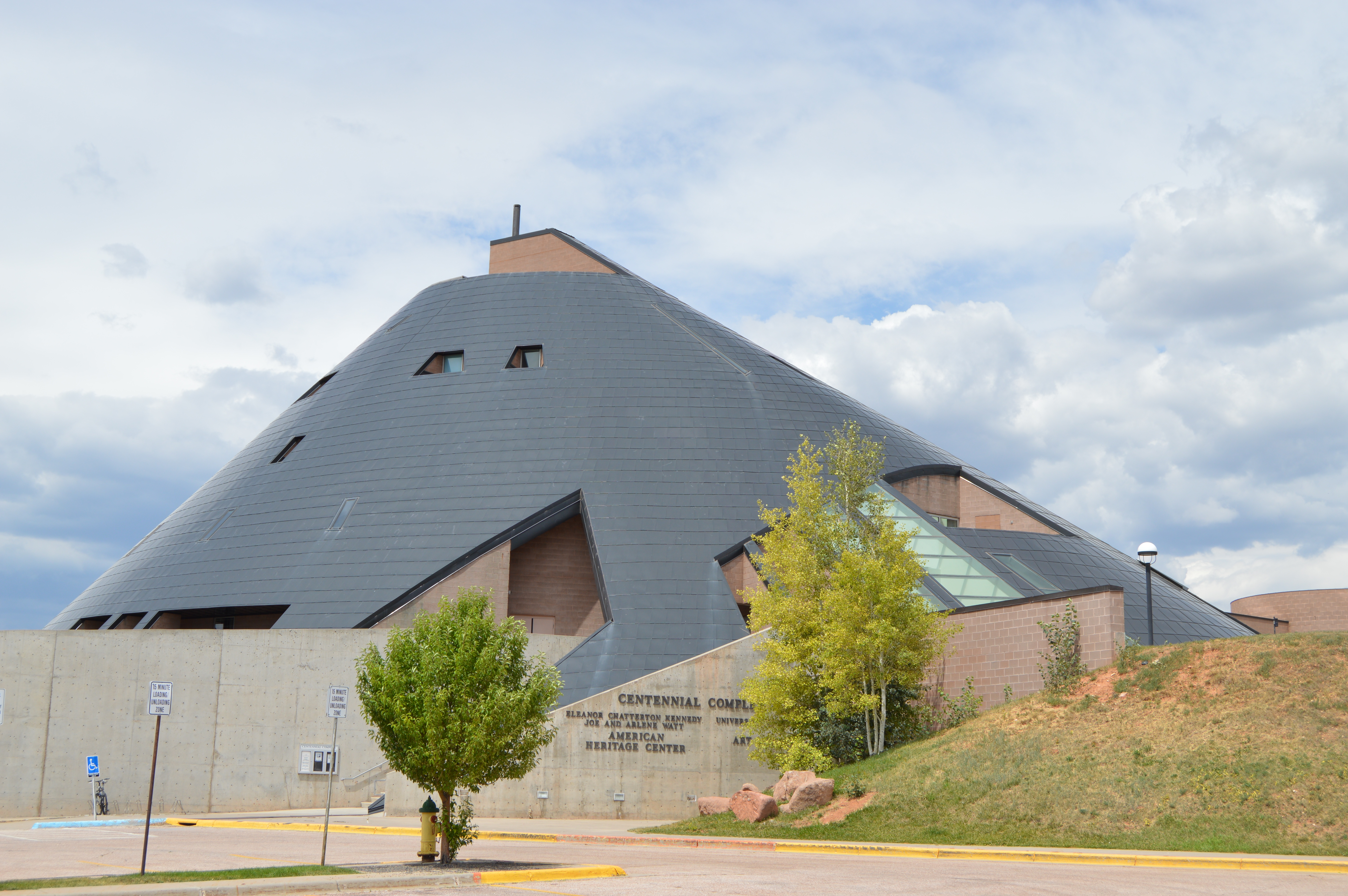
Centennial Complex houses the American Heritage Center and the University of Wyoming Art Museum

==== American Heritage Center ====
The American Heritage Center, located in the Centennial Complex, is an extensive repository of manuscripts, photographs, artworks, movies, audio recordings, and other items. It is one of the largest non-governmental archives west of the Mississippi River. Officially established in 1945, it now contains over 90,000 cubic feet (2,500 m^{3}) of historic documents and materials. It is also home to the Toppan Library, which contains over 50,000 rare books. Because of its size, the AHC has many collecting areas. It features Wyoming and Western history from the early nineteenth to the twenty-first century; women's suffrage; transportation history, including railroad history (especially the transcontinental railroad) as well as aviation; and mineral, coal, and oil extraction. It has extensive entertainment collections in theater, radio and television, film, music, Hollywood (from Jack Benny and Barbara Stanwyck to Stan Lee), politics and journalism, authors, composers, and artists.

==== University of Wyoming Art Museum ====
The University of Wyoming Art Museum is also located in the Centennial Complex on East Willet Drive. The museum's collections include art in many media from around the world, including: European and American paintings, prints, sculpture and drawings; 18th and 19th century Japanese Ukiyo-e prints; 15th through 19th century Persian and Indian miniature paintings; 20th century Haitian art; 20th century Japanese netsuke; 20th century and contemporary photography; and Rapa Nui, African, and Native American artifacts. Artists in the collection include Thomas Hart Benton, Ralston Crawford, Jun Kaneko, Hung Liu, Aristide Maillol, Joan Miró, Richard Misrach, Robert Rauschenberg and Paul Signac. The museum also hosts changing exhibits of art from around the world. The Centennial Complex was designed by Antoine Predock and opened in 1993.

In collaboration with the College of Law, the museum conducts research and instruction on the Native American Graves Protection and Repatriation Act (NAGPRA) and legal issues surrounding the repatriation of human remains.

==== University of Wyoming Geological Museum ====
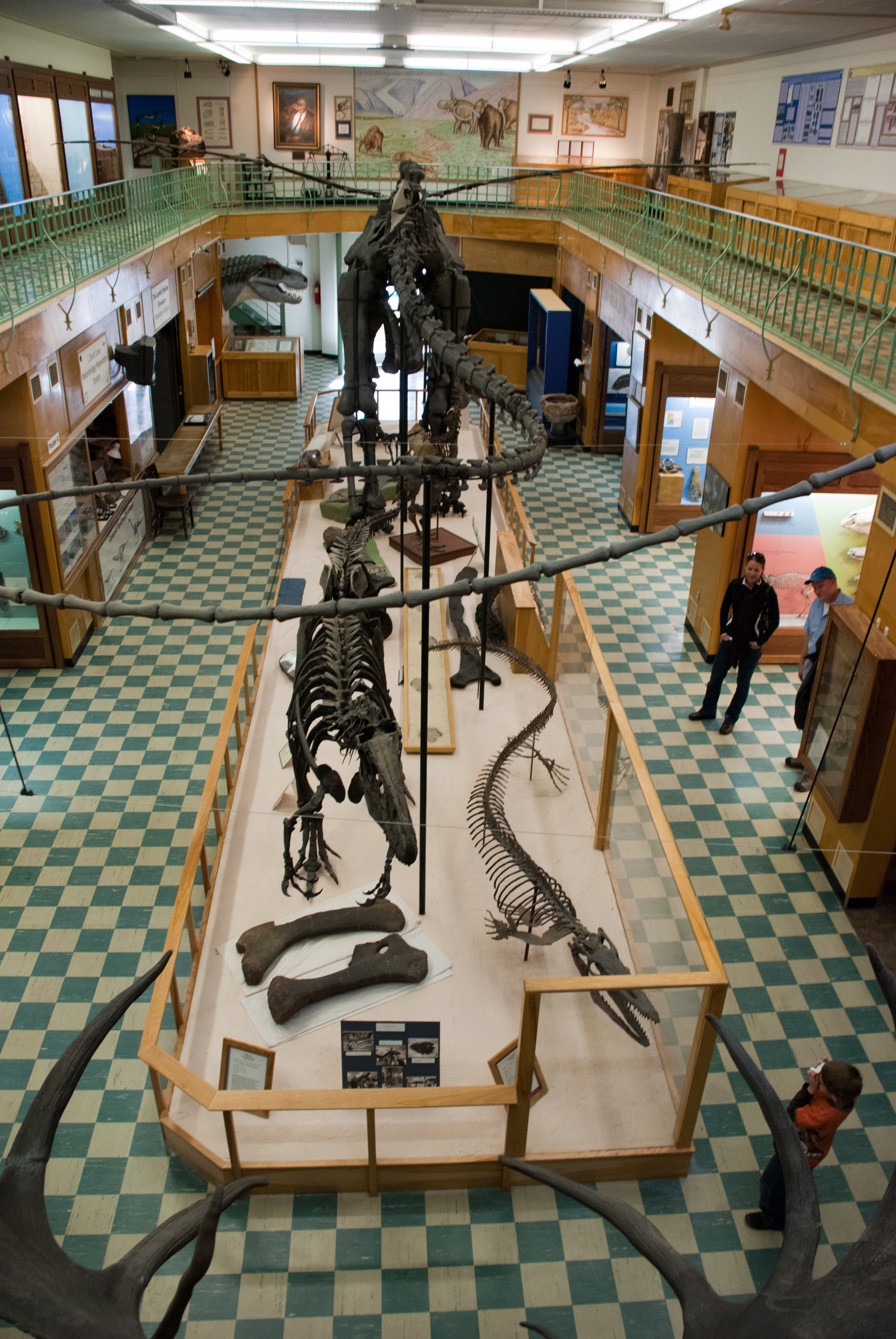
The University of Wyoming Geological Museum

The University of Wyoming's Geological Museum houses a collection of fossils and minerals with special focus on the history of Wyoming. When the University of Wyoming was founded, the museum was essentially the small personal collection of Professor J.D. Conley. In 1893, Wilbur Knight, who was hired as a professor of mining and geology, took over as the museum curator. The museum moved to the Hall of Science in 1902 and continued to expand. By the time the collection was moved to its current location in 1956, Knight's son Samuel Howell Knight had made the university's Geology Department well known around the country. Samuel Howell Knight acquired many of the exhibits and paintings that are still on display, including the copper Tyrannosaurus at the entrance, the initial mounting of the Apatosaurus skeleton centerpiece, and the terracotta Stegosaurus and Triceratops panels.

One of the most famous exhibits at the museum is the Allosaurus known as "Big Al". It was featured in the BBC documentary The Ballad of Big Al. The University of Wyoming Geological Museum has also received coverage from National Geographic, CNN, Earth Magazine, Walter Cronkite, and NBC Nightly News with Tom Brokaw, and it has been shown on many dinosaur programs. On June 30, 2009, the museum was closed to meet state budget cuts. Following this controversial decision, an endowment fund was set up to support the museum. After substantial infrastructure upgrades, the museum reopened to the public on January 12, 2013 and resumed its regular hours with free admission. Some exhibits, like the Late Cretaceous display, have been completed, while others are still under renovation.

==== University of Wyoming Anthropology Museum ====
The University of Wyoming Anthropology Museum is operated by the Anthropology Department and is located in the Anthropology Building at 12th and Lewis Streets. Exhibits are spread throughout three floors of the building. Displays include early humans, the Colby Mammoth Site, Vore Buffalo Jump, and other Wyoming archaeology sites.

==== University of Wyoming Insect Museum ====
The University of Wyoming Insect Museum is a research museum located in the Agriculture Building. Displays include mounted insects, a small zoo with living insects, and an interactive discovery cabinet.

== Academics ==
Academic rankings

National
- Forbes: 189
- U.S. News & World Report: 220
- Washington Monthly: 81
- WSJ/College Pulse: 245

Global
- ARWU: 701–800
- QS: 801–1000
- THE: 601–800
- U.S. News & World Report: 822

USNWR graduate school rankings
Education	127
Engineering	141
Law	132

USNWR departmental rankings
Biological Sciences	159
Chemistry	122
Clinical Psychology	124
Computer Science	147
Earth Sciences	46
Economics	68
Mathematics	127
Pharmacy	53
Psychology	148
Public Affairs	165
Social Work	168
Speech–Language Pathology	92

The University of Wyoming comprises the following colleges and schools:

- College of Agriculture, Life Sciences and Natural Resources
- College of Arts and Sciences
- College of Business
- School of Computing
- College of Education
- College of Engineering and Physical Sciences
- School of Energy Resources
- Haub School of Environment and Natural Resources
- College of Health Sciences
- College of Law
- Honors College

The College of Agriculture and Natural Resources offers teaching, research labs and field environments, and an indoor livestock teaching arena.

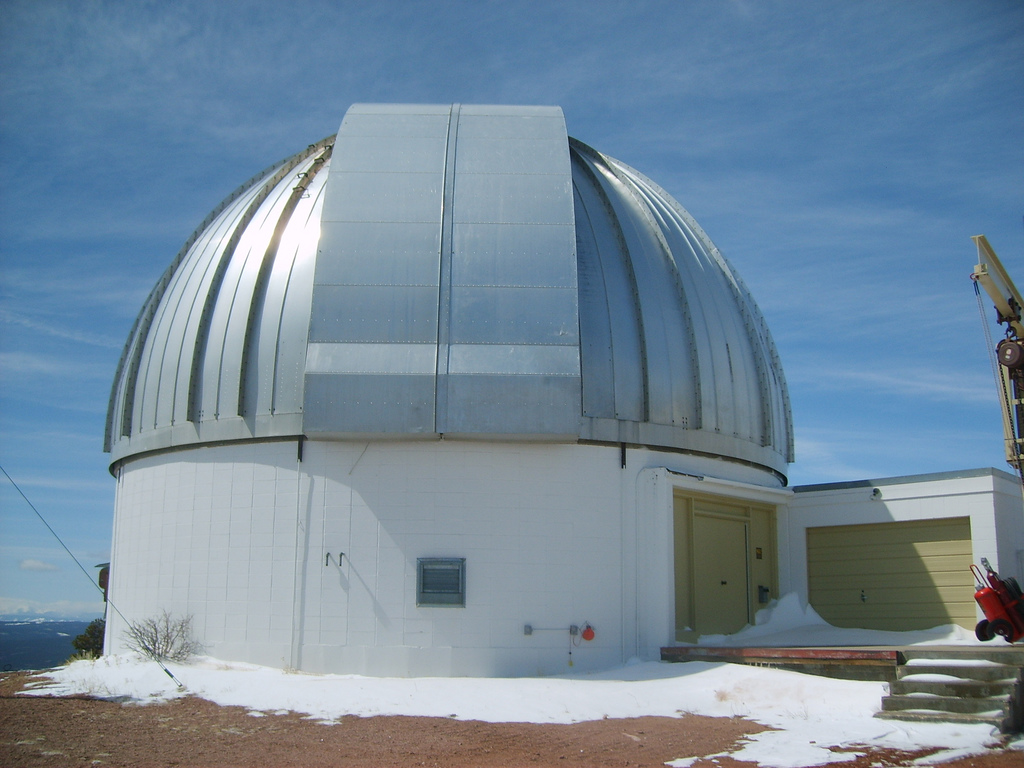
The University of Wyoming Infrared Observatory (WIRO)

The College of Arts and Sciences offers more than 50 majors, 60 minors, and seven interdisciplinary programs. Geology, Archaeology, Botany, and Geography programs take advantage of Wyoming's unique environment, while International Studies, Sociology, and Political Science provide global context. A&S emphasizes field study, internships, and individual research projects, and has exchange programs and study abroad. In 2010, the university announced that it had received its largest estate gift ever, from the artist Neltje Doubleday Kings, known as Neltje, consisting of her ranches, art collection, and other holdings. When realized, the gift created the UW Neltje Center for the Visual and Literary Arts, combining programs of three of the university's departments: creative writing, arts, and the art museum.

The College of Business is accredited at the undergraduate and graduate levels by AACSB. More than 100 business scholarships are awarded annually.

The College of Education comprises two schools: the School of Counseling, Leadership, Advocacy, and Design; and the School of Teacher Education. Both certificates and programs that lead to initial certification or endorsements by Wyoming's Professional Teaching Standards Board (PTSB) are offered for pre-service teachers. Partnerships with Wyoming public schools provide for hands-on experience in real classrooms, and the on-campus, K-9 lab school provides a model of teaching and learning. The Counselor Education Training Clinic within the college offers free services for individuals, couples, families, adults, adolescents, and children. Services are provided by advanced graduate students under qualified clinical supervision.

Engineering Hall

Offering 12 programs of study, the College of Engineering and Applied Science provides also undergraduate research opportunities, an International Engineering Program, and Earth Systems Science.

The Enhanced Oil Recovery Institute (EORI) was formed regarding the implementation of Enhanced Oil Recovery (EOR) techniques in Wyoming. The mission of EORI is "to promote the recovery of Wyoming's 'stranded' oil." The Institute assists Wyoming operators with EOR projects by applying existing technologies and creating new knowledge when necessary, maximize the economic potential, minimize the risk of EOR projects, facilitate the testing, evaluation, and documentation of EOR recommendations in the real world settings, and transfer the information to Wyoming producers by forming partnerships and conducting workshops and conferences. The School of Energy Resources (SER) at the University of Wyoming was created in 2006 to enhance the university's energy-related education, research, and outreach. SER showcases the many energy research projects at UW and bridges academics and industry.

The University of Wyoming's Haub School of Environment and Natural Resources (ENR) advances the understanding and resolution of environmental and natural resource challenges through education, dissemination of information, and collaborative decision-making support. Its academic programs emphasize interdisciplinary learning, providing students with applied learning experiences that prepare them to consider multiple perspectives to address natural resource issues. The Ruckelshaus Institute produces reports and convenes events on natural resource issues. The school offers courses in negotiation, facilitation, and media relations for natural resource professionals. The Biodiversity Institute provides research, education, and outreach to support biodiversity conservation and management. In 2016, the university announced that the Haub School would become a full academic college beginning in the 2017 academic year.

The College of Health Sciences offers programs in pharmacy, nursing, social work, kinesiology, communication disorders, and dental hygiene, and students have the opportunity to receive pre-professional advising.

The College of Law was founded in 1920 and has been accredited by the American Bar Association since 1923. Its location in the Rocky Mountain West has provided a direct connection to regional and global issues in environmental, natural resources, and energy law. The alumni includes many state and federal judges, governors, senators and a former ambassador, and offers eight clinical and practicum programs providing students with hands-on experience in the Brimmer Legal Education Center.

In May 2017, the university began working to change the Honors Program to the Honors College and search for an Honors College Dean from within the university faculty.

With headquarters at the University of Wyoming, international research is underway documenting the Great Nile Migration Landscape.

=== Outreach ===
The mission of the University of Wyoming's Outreach School is to extend the University of Wyoming to the state and the world, and bring the world to Wyoming. It has several divisions. Outreach Credit Programs, in partnership with the university's colleges and departments, delivers both in and outside the state more than 41 degrees, programs, and certificates, both online or through "blended" learning technologies such as audio conferencing, video conferencing, and correspondence study. As of Spring 2014, Outreach School students accounted for 23.6% of enrollments at the University of Wyoming.

There are nine Outreach Regional Centers in Wyoming, each with an Academic Coordinator and staff provide student support services. The University of Wyoming at Casper is a partnership between the University of Wyoming and Casper College and offers a small, residential campus experience. Students at UW-Casper can pursue bachelor's, master's, and doctorate degrees, as well as certificates and endorsements. The International Programs Office supports both international students and faculty and provides a number of different international study opportunities.

Wyoming Public Media operates three radio services that cover 90% of Wyoming, as well as an online service and NPR news service. Outreach Technology Services, including UWTV, provides technological access to students enrolled in distance courses, as well as those at UW-Casper. Additionally, the Outreach School administers Summer Session, J-Term, and Saturday University.

== Student life ==
Undergraduate demographics as of Fall 2023
Race and ethnicity	Total
White	78%
Hispanic	9%
Two or more races	4%
Unknown	4%
American Indian/Alaska Native	1%
Asian	1%
Black	1%
International student	1%
Economic diversity
Low-income (Note: The percentage of students who received an income-based federal Pell grant intended for low-income students.)	22%
Affluent (Note: The percentage of students who are a part of the American middle class at the bare minimum.)	78%

The university's Campus Sustainability Committee (CSC) advises all departments and programs on sustainability matters and oversees the university's efforts and progress toward reducing its carbon footprint. All new campus buildings are required to meet LEED silver certification of the U.S. Green Building Council. UW president Tom Buchanan signed the American College & University Presidents Climate Commitment in 2007. For their advances on university sustainability, UW scored a "C" on the College Sustainability Report Card of the Sustainable Endowments Institute.

Nearly all fraternities and sororities are located on campus in private or university-owned houses.

The Outdoor Program offers many activities for outdoor enthusiasts. The program was established in 1997. Students go on single, multiday, and week-long excursions like rock climbing, white water rafting, ice climbing, snowshoeing, backcountry skiing, and mountain biking.

=== Owen Wister Review ===
The Owen Wister Review is the university's annual art and literature magazine produced through the Student Media department, which publishes creative non-fiction, poetry, fiction, and art. The editorial staff is made up entirely of undergraduate and graduate students. The journal was established in 1978 and named for Owen Wister, who set the first modern western novel, The Virginian, not far from Laramie, in the town of Medicine Bow. In 2008 and again in 2009, the magazine was awarded a Magazine Pacemaker Award by the Associated College Press.

== Athletics ==
Wyoming Cowboy statue

University of Wyoming athletics teams are named the Cowboys and Cowgirls. Their official song is "Ragtime Cowboy Joe". Wyoming competes at the NCAA Division I level (FBS-Football Bowl Subdivision for football) as a member of the Mountain West Conference.

UW offers 17 NCAA-sanctioned sports–nine women's sports and eight men's sports. Wyoming's nine NCAA sports for women are basketball, cross country, golf, soccer, swimming and diving, tennis, indoor track & field, outdoor track and field, and volleyball. UW's eight NCAA sports for men are basketball, cross country, football, golf, swimming and diving, indoor track and field, outdoor track and field, and wrestling. (Note: Attributed to multiple sources:)

=== The "Black 14" ===
In 1969, the UW football team was undefeated in mid-October and ranked sixteenth in the AP poll. Head coach Lloyd Eaton kicked 14 Black players off the team for wanting to protest what they considered the racist policies within Brigham Young University (BYU) and the LDS Church before the annual conference game against BYU in Laramie on October 18. After the Cowboys went 1–9 the following year, the school decided to remove him. In 2019, the school publicly apologized for this incident, and invited all living players back to campus to be honored.

== See also ==
- Owen Wister Review
