= 1956 Northern Michigan Wildcats football team =

American college football season

1956 Northern Michigan Wildcats football
- Conference: Independent
- Record: 7–0–1
- Head coach: Lloyd Eaton (1st season)
- Home stadium: Memorial Field

1956 Midwestern non-major college football independents records
	Conf.			Overall
Team	W	L	T	W		L		T
Northern Michigan		–		7	–	0	–	1
St. Norbert		–		8	–	1	–	0
Carthage		–		8	–	2	–	0
Wabash		–		6	–	2	–	1
Xavier		–		7	–	3	–	0
Washington University		–		6	–	3	–	0
Baldwin–Wallace		–		4	–	5	–	0
Rose Poly		–		3	–	4	–	0

The 1956 Northern Michigan Wildcats football team was an American football team that represented Northern Michigan College (later renamed Northern Michigan University) as an independent during the 1956 college football season. The team compiled a 7–0–1 record and outscored opponents by a total of 263 to 72. It remains Northern Michigan's only undefeated season since the 1929 season when the team compiled a 4–0–2 record.

Lloyd Eaton, who had been head coach and athletic director at Alma College for seven years, was hired as Northern Michigan's head coach in February 1956. He took over a team that had lost every game in 1955 and led the 1956 squad to an undefeated season. He was touted in the press as the "Miracle Man of the Gridiron". He was also named the 1956 coach of the year by the Associated Press and National Association of Intercollegiate Athletics.

The team's only setback was a 13–13 tie with Bemidji State. The Wildcats trailed Bemidji until freshman quarterback Tom Schwalbach ran seven yards for a touchdown in the final 90 seconds of the game. Schwalbach, recently discharged from service in the Marine Corps, led all collegiate football players in Michigan with 103 points scored (14 touchdowns and 19 extra points) during the 1956 season. Schwalbach tallied 1,100 yards of total offense (493 rushing yards and 607 passing yards). Schwalbach and Whitey Wilson were described as the team's "one-two punch".

Schalbach was the only Northern Michigan player selected as a first-team player on the 1956 Associated Press All-Michigan small college football team. Center Jim Wickam and tackle Wayne Thoms received honorable mention.

== Schedule ==
Date	Opponent	Site	Result	Attendance	Source
September 22	at Alma	Alma, MI	W 32–0		
September 29	Northland	Marquette, MI	W 38–12		
October 6	at Bemidji State	Bemidji, MN	T 13–13		
October 13	at Michigan Tech	Houghton, MI	W 20–13		
October 20	Ferris Institute	Marquette, MI	W 19–0		
October 27	Superior State	Marquette, MI	W 41–6		
November 3	Mayville State	Marquette, MI	W 54–20		
November 10	Lakeland	Marquette, MI	W 46–18		
