= Tony McGee (defensive lineman) =

American football player (born 1949)

No. 71, 78
- Position: Defensive end

Personal information
- Born: January 18, 1949 (age 77); Battle Creek, Michigan, U.S.
- Listed height: 6 ft 4 in (1.93 m)
- Listed weight: 250 lb (113 kg)

Career information
- High school: Battle Creek
- College: Wyoming, Bishop
- NFL draft: 1971: 3rd round, 64th overall pick

Career history
- Chicago Bears (1971–1973); New England Patriots (1974–1981); Washington Redskins (1982–1984)

Awards and highlights
- Super Bowl champion (XVII); New England Patriots All-1970s Team

Career NFL statistics
- Sacks: 103
- Fumble recoveries: 12
- Stats at Pro Football Reference

Anthony Eugene McGee (born January 18, 1949) is an American former professional football player who was a defensive end for 14 seasons in the National Football League (NFL), including two Super Bowls with the Washington Redskins. He played college football for the Wyoming Cowboys before being dismissed as part of the Black 14 in 1969. McGee continued his college career with the Bishop Tigers and was selected in the third round of the 1971 NFL draft by the Chicago Bears.

== College career ==
Born and raised in Battle Creek, Michigan, McGee played college football at the University of Wyoming in Laramie. In his junior season in 1969, the team was off to a 4–0 start, ranked #16 in the AP poll, and appeared headed for a fourth straight conference title. But on Friday, October 17, the day before the home game against BYU, McGee and thirteen other African American players went to head coach Lloyd Eaton's office to discuss how they might participate in a protest called by the UW Black Students Alliance against the Church of Jesus Christ of Latter-day Saints tenet which prohibited black men from becoming priests. As soon as Eaton saw them wearing black arm bands, he took them into the Memorial Fieldhouse bleachers and immediately informed them they were all off the team because they violated the coach's rule against participating in demonstrations.

The rule was withdrawn the next week, but the players were not reinstated. McGee and five others were starters, and after this, the Wyoming football program was not the same. Although the suddenly all-white Cowboys defeated BYU and San Jose State to improve to 6–0, they lost their four road games in November. In 1970, the Cowboys went 1–9 and Eaton "retired" from coaching, reassigned to assistant athletic director. Wyoming posted only one winning season in the 1970s, in 1976.

Three of the Black 14 underclassmen returned to the team in 1970, but McGee finished his college career in Texas at Bishop College in Dallas. He was projected to be a first round pick in the 1971 NFL draft, but fell to the third round (64th overall) because word passed around that he was a troublemaker due to his dismissal from Wyoming and his involvement in the Black 14.

== Professional career ==
McGee played 14 years as a defensive lineman in the NFL with the Chicago Bears (1971–73), New England Patriots (1974–81), and Washington Redskins (1982–85). Known as "Mac the Sack" because of his ability to get to the quarterback, McGee had a career total of 106.5 sacks. A durable defensive lineman, McGee played in 203 games, missing only one game during his entire NFL career. He was a nominee for the Pro Football Hall of Fame in 1994. While with the Redskins, McGee played in Super Bowls XVII (1983) and XVIII (1984), winning the former.

== TV career ==
McGee is the founder and host of the longest-running minority-owned sports talk show in the Washington, D.C. region. His "Pro Football Plus" television show is currently celebrating thirty-eight seasons.
