= Revolving Loan Fund =

Source of money for small business loans

A Revolving Loan Fund (RLF) is a source of money from which loans are made for multiple small business development projects. Revolving loan funds share many characteristics with microcredit, micro-enterprise, and village banking, namely providing loans to persons or groups of people that do not qualify for traditional financial services or are otherwise viewed as being high risk. Borrowers tend to be small producers of goods and services: typically, they are artisans, farmers, and women with no credit history or access to other types of loans from financial institutions. Organizations that offer revolving loan fund lending aim to help new project or business owners become financially independent and eventually to become eligible for loans from commercial banks.

The fund gets its name from the revolving aspect of loan repayment in which the central fund is replenished as individual projects pay back their loans, creating the opportunity to issue other loans to new projects.

== Popularity in academia ==
=== Green Revolving Fund (GRF) ===
The revolving loan fund is often referred to as a green revolving fund, or GRF, when it is initiated on college and university campuses. These types of funds target projects that improve campus energy-efficiency, reduce resource use, and implement other projects and programs that fall under the category of sustainability. In recent years, GRFs have become increasingly popular on campuses in the United States. The funds operate and are managed by the university, with loans issued to university departments or campus groups.

In February 2013, the Association for the Advancement of Sustainability in Higher Education (AASHE) released a database of campus sustainability revolving loan funds. As of March 2013, there were 84 revolving loan funds at 80 institutions in North America containing $118,737,518.

==== Sample of Green Revolving Funds ====
- Harvard University (MA) - The Green Loan Fund was created in 2001 and has $12,000,000.
- Western Michigan University (MI) - WMU's Quasi GRF was created in 1980 and has $365,000.
- Oberlin College (OH) - The student-run Green EDGE Fund was created in 2007 and has $344,000.
- Lane Community College (OR) - Lane's Energy Management Fund was initiated in 2006 and has $122,000 available.
- Oregon State University (OR) - Oregon State Universities Sustainable Energy Revolving Loan Fund was initiated in 2010 and has $300,3000.
- Carleton College (MN) - The Sustainability Revolving Fund (SRF) began in 2007 and has $71,101.
- College of Wooster (OH) - The Revolving Environmental Efficiency Fund (REEF) was developed in 2010 and has $5,000.

==== Greening the Bottom Line: the Trend towards Green Revolving Funds on Campus ====
In February 2011 the Sustainable Endowments Institute published the paper "Greening the Bottom Line: the Trend toward Green Revolving Funds on Campus." The paper researched the 52 active green revolving funds in the US, with findings based on a series of interviews and surveys with sustainability directors and administrators involved in green revolving fund development and operation at the college and university level.

Greening the Bottom Line reports on a green revolving fund's formation, operation, and financial performance. The report was written with the explicit purpose to provide a baseline for tracking the continuing emergence of green revolving funds in higher education to act and to act as a resource for institutions interested in establishing their own.

Greening the Bottom Line found that for those institutions with green revolving funds:

- the number of institutions with green revolving funds is growing. Out of the 52 reported active green revolving funds, 37 funds were created between 2008 and 2011.
- an institution does not have to be wealthy to create a green revolving fund: over 32 percent of funds reported in Greening the Bottom Line are $100,000 or less.
- there was a range of college and university endowment size, from $7.6 million (Lane Community College) to $25 billion (Harvard University).
- there was a range of college and university student population, from 1,381 students (Kalamazoo College) to 42,000 students (the University of Illinois Urbana-Champaign).
- schools reported a range on their GRF project portfolio's return on investment from 29 percent (Iowa State University) to 63 percent (the University of Denver).

==== Sample of GRF-Supported Projects ====
Green revolving funds can invest in a wide variety of projects and have supported projects that impact a university's carbon footprint or local environment. Examples of these projects include: installing technology that conserves water and electricity; improving campus recycling rates; instituting a campus composting program; increasing campus waste diversion from landfills; replacing a fuel source (e.g. converting campus plants to burn biomass or biodiesel instead of traditional fuel sources); and introducing behavioral change programs that raise student awareness of individual resource use.

School	Project	Payback Period	Cost W/O Incentives	Savings
Iowa State University	Energy-saving software on 500 computers	23 days	$3,039	$49,000 annually (projected)
University of Notre Dame	Traded 7,450 incandescent bulbs for energy-efficient fluorescents in student housing	1 year	$17,600	$20,000 annually
Oberlin College	Upgraded 30 showerheads at 2.35 gpm with low-flow 1.5 gpm	1 year	$900	$866 annually

==== Types of Green Revolving Funds ====
There are three types of green revolving funds that target different institutional priorities.

1. Efficiency funds provide capital to energy and/or water efficiency measures. Their goals are to reduce resources and save money. Project ideas are initiated and managed by staff from Facilities, Energy Management and/or Finance Departments. Efficiency funds tend to require a relatively short payback period and are typically not used to engage the broader campus community.
2. Innovation and engagement funds explicitly seek community engagement in project proposals. The projects it funds may have short paybacks, long paybacks, or no payback requirements. Innovation funds often provide loans that require repayment for projects that will result in operational savings, and they use these returns to subsidize grants for projects that will not result in cost savings. Innovation funds are generally administered by a committee and often include significant student participation and/or oversight.
3. Hybrid funds target resource reduction and cost saving, but also consider community engagement and outreach goals. The majority of funds follow this model. They finance efficiency projects in addition to a wider range of initiatives such as renewable energy development, solid waste diversion, and reducing use of materials like paper or synthetic lawn chemicals. Hybrid funds often seek to engage and/or educate the campus community in sustainability efforts. A broad set of campus stakeholder groups tend to provide oversight to hybrid funds while they are administered by facilities or sustainability staff.

==== Benefits of a Green Revolving Fund ====
Green revolving funds can impact many aspects of an institution's daily operations. They can be used to:

- Provide up-front capital for energy and/or water efficiency measures.
- Reduce a school's operating budget(s) by decreasing campus electrical and water consumption.
- Reduce a school's carbon footprint and greenhouse gas emissions.
- Record baseline data to compare resource-use consumption over time and/or to promote increased tracking of energy and water use.
- Update aging infrastructure by installing newer energy-efficient technology.
- Improve campus building comfort, functionality, and efficiency as well as reduce building maintenance needs.
- Develop renewable energy technology that can be used to further campus research and offer opportunities for interdisciplinary education and research on sustainability, which can provide additional resources to supplement the curriculum.
- Ensure that a school will have a ready source of capital earmarked explicitly for projects that have a demonstrated impact on sustainability, operating without the threat of seed money or cost savings being reabsorbed into a utility or central administrative budget.
- Foster collaboration between offices of finance, sustainability, facilities, faculty, and students.
- Accrue savings because of a high reported return on investment and a high level of involvement by the campus community.

=== Financial data on Green Revolving Funds ===
==== Return on Investment ====
Green revolving funds on the college and university level report a high return on investment. The highest reported ROI is at the University of Denver with 63 percent ROI for their Energy Reserve Fund's project portfolio. The minimum reported ROI is from Iowa State University's Live Green Revolving Loan Fund with a 29 percent ROI.

==== Payback periods ====
Schools with green revolving funds report an average project payback periods ranging from 1 year to 10 years, with a median of 4 years.

==== Sourcing Seed Funding ====
Colleges and universities seek seed funding from a variety of sources, including:

- allocations from the central budget or other administrative sources
- the installation of student fees and student government grants
- previous efficiency and utility cost savings
- Outside donations or other foundation funding
- investments from the endowment, or
- a combination of two or more of the above sources.

== Resources ==
Dieboldt, A., Den Herder-Thomas, T., "Creating a Campus Sustainability Revolving Loan Fund", Association for the Advancement of Sustainability in Higher Education; April 2007.

Weisbord, D., Dautremont-Smith, J., Orlowski, M. "Greening the Bottom Line: the Trend toward Green Revolving Funds on Campus", the Sustainable Endowments Institute; February 2011.

Flynn, E., Orlowski, M., Weisbord, D. "Greening the Bottom Line 2012", the Sustainable Endowments Institute; October 2012.
