= Mel Hamilton =

Mel Hamilton is an American former college football player for the University of Wyoming in 1969. He was one of 14 players removed from the team for wearing black armbands in a protest against Brigham Young University because of the Church of Jesus Christ of Latter-day Saints' policy at the time preventing men of African descent from holding the priesthood.

Hamilton had been raised Catholic.

In 2005 the LDS Institute of Religion in Laramie invited Hamilton to give a speech. Hamilton and his associates have also been praised by Darius Gray, an African-American Latter-day Saint who went to Wyoming to try to defuse the situation in 1969, for taking a non-violent route in voicing their concerns.

Hamilton's son Malik Hamilton joined the Church of Jesus Christ of Latter-day Saints while a student at Utah State University. He was a chef at Brigham Young University from 2008 to 2010.

== Sources ==
- Mormon Times, Oct. 22, 2009
