= Leon McLaughlin =

American football player and coach (1925–2014)

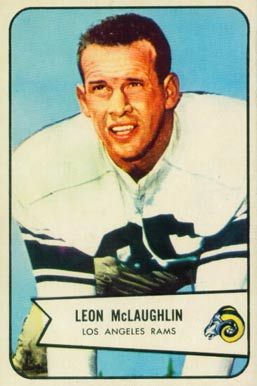
- McLaughlin on a 1954 Bowman football card

No. 50
- Position: Center

Personal information
- Born: May 30, 1925; San Diego, California, U.S.
- Died: October 27, 2014 (aged 89); King County, Washington, U.S.
- Listed height: 6 ft 2 in (1.88 m)
- Listed weight: 228 lb (103 kg)

Career information
- High school: Santa Monica (Santa Monica, California)
- College: UCLA
- NFL draft: 1947: 21st round, 193rd overall pick

Career history

Playing
- Los Angeles Rams (1951–1955)

Coaching
- Washington State (1956) Assistant; Stanford (1959–1965) Assistant; Pittsburgh Steelers (1966–1968) Assistant; Valley State (1969–1970) Head coach; Los Angeles Rams (1971–1972) Assistant; Detroit Lions (1973–1974) Assistant; Green Bay Packers (1975–1976) Offensive line; New England Patriots (1977) Offensive line; St. Louis / Phoenix Cardinals (1978–1989) Assistant

Awards and highlights
- NFL champion (1951); Pro Bowl (1954); Second-team All-PCC (1949)

Career NFL statistics
- Games played: 60
- Games started: 60
- Fumble recoveries: 4
- Stats at Pro Football Reference

Leon Clifford McLaughlin (May 30, 1925 – October 27, 2014) was an American football player and coach. He played professionally as a center for five seasons with the Los Angeles Rams of National Football League (NFL). After his playing career he served as assistant coach for several NFL teams: Pittsburgh Steelers (1966–68), Los Angeles Rams (1971–72), Detroit Lions (1973–74), Green Bay Packers (1975–76), New England Patriots (1977), and St. Louis / Phoenix Cardinals (1978–89). McLaughlin was the head football coach at San Fernando Valley State College—now known as California State University, Northridge—from 1969 to 1970.

== Head coaching record ==
Year	Team	Overall	Conference	Standing	Bowl/playoffs
Valley State Matadors (California Collegiate Athletic Association) (1969–1970)
1969	Valley State	4–5	1–1	2nd	
1970	Valley State	4–6	1–2	3rd	
Plymouth State:		8–11	2–3		
Total:		8–11			
