= Professional Spring Football League =

Proposed American football league, 1992

The Professional Spring Football League (PSFL) was a proposed minor league of outdoor American football slated to begin in 1992. The league was founded by Vincent Sette, a computer sales executive, while TV executive Rex Lardner served as commissioner.

== Beginning ==
Spring football was nothing new by the early 90s: the United States Football League played three seasons from 1983-85, while the NFL's own minor league, the World League of American Football, was starting its second season in 1992. Lardner was unconcerned about the USFL's failure or competition from the WLAF: "We're going to play a new brand of football that will create excitement." Two-point conversions were to be allowed and overtime was to be a modified sudden death, with each team being guaranteed a possession. The PSFL also had what they called a "universal ticket" which allowed season ticket holders to attend any league game anywhere in the country.

Announced on October 1, 1991 -- less than five months before their scheduled opening game -- the PSFL had no TV contract, but did air a preview show on SportsChannel America in 1991, laying out the ten teams that would play. Walt Michaels, former coach of the New York Jets and the USFL's New Jersey Generals was announced as the PSFL's Director of Football Operations, but apparently had no role with the league going forward.

The PSFL also hired some fairly high-profile coaches (including ex-Denver Gold coach Craig Morton and former Detroit Lions and college coach Darryl Rogers), and a number of current or future notable arena football and NFL players were in the teams' training camps, including mid-90s Miami Dolphins running back Bernie Parmalee, AFL quarterback Ben Bennett, AFL defensive specialist Durwood Roquemore, and AFL wide receiver/defensive back Barry Wagner. Also vying for spots in the PSFL were former Notre Dame signal-caller Tony Rice and running back Timmy Smith, who rushed for a then-record 204 yards in Super Bowl XXII for the Washington Redskins. The team salary cap was set at $2 million per team with 50-man rosters.

The 1992 PSFL season was set to begin in Tampa on February 29, with the Utah Pioneers taking on the Tampa Bay Outlaws. There was to be a sixteen-game regular season through June 14, two rounds of playoffs, and the championship game (or "Red, White And Blue Bowl"), scheduled for Robert F. Kennedy Memorial Stadium in Washington, D.C., on Sunday, July 5.

The league was the first sports LLC, which has been used as a blueprint for several leagues since, such as Major League Soccer and the WNBA. Rather than the league being set up as a non-profit organization which technically exists for the benefit of its for-profit franchises, the PSFL was one single corporation (the "entity" model of sports league organization) with limited partners operating the teams and performing many of the functions usually performed by team owners in the traditional model of North American professional sport organization. The idea was to eliminate weak financial teams as well as the potential for collusion as all players were contracted by the PSFL, and then assigned to individual teams.

== Ending ==
Many sports leagues have folded before actually playing a game, but the PSFL probably got the closest to starting their season before the plug was pulled; each team had players already in camp and practicing, and rosters cut down to 60 players. On February 11, 1992, the Miami Tribe (who had actually played a game, an exhibition against the Miami Police Department team) disbanded after its equipment was seized as collateral against an unpaid hotel bill at training camp in Florida. Meanwhile, the Washington Marauders (whose entire operation, including equipment, was being run out of a single hotel room in Deland, Florida) stated they had sold only 100 season tickets, and also threatened to quit the league without more money. Finally, the end of the PSFL was announced by Lardner on February 19, just ten days before the scheduled season opener, after a needed cash infusion of $1 million did not surface. The league had over $7 million in escrow from ticket sales as funds were not to be spent until the games were played and revenues were earned. This protected fans and sponsors from losses or failure, and ticketholders received full refunds. The teams shut down all on the same day as all invoiced expenses were paid by the league headquarters. The PSFL tried to regroup for 1993 season, but again the start-up funding did not get secured and the league organization disbanded.

== Teams ==
Eastern Division
Team	City	Venue	Head coach
Carolina Cougars	Columbia, South Carolina	Williams-Brice Stadium	Pete Kettela
Miami Tribe	Miami	Orange Bowl	Pete McCulley
New England Blitz	Worcester, Massachusetts	Fitton Field	Steve Grogan
Tampa Bay Outlaws	Tampa, Florida	Tampa Stadium	Boyd Dowler
Washington Marauders	Washington, D.C.	RFK Stadium	Guy Morriss
Western Division
Arkansas Miners	Little Rock, Arkansas	War Memorial Stadium	Darryl Rogers
Nevada Aces	Las Vegas, Nevada	Sam Boyd Silver Bowl	Steve Goldman
New Mexico Rattlesnakes	Albuquerque, New Mexico	University Stadium	Al Bruno
Oregon Lightning Bolts	Portland, Oregon	Civic Stadium	Craig Morton
Utah Pioneers	Salt Lake City	Robert Rice Stadium	John D'Ottavio
