= 1969 Arizona State Sun Devils football team =

American college football season

1969 Arizona State Sun Devils football

WAC champion
- Conference: Western Athletic Conference
- Record: 8–2 (6–1 WAC)
- Head coach: Frank Kush (12th season)
- Home stadium: Sun Devil Stadium

1969 Western Athletic Conference football standings
	Conf.					Overall
Team	W		L		T	W		L		T
Arizona State $	6	–	1	–	0	8	–	2	–	0
Utah	5	–	1	–	0	8	–	2	–	0
BYU	4	–	3	–	0	6	–	4	–	0
Wyoming	4	–	3	–	0	6	–	4	–	0
Arizona	3	–	3	–	0	3	–	7	–	0
UTEP	2	–	5	–	0	4	–	6	–	0
New Mexico	1	–	5	–	0	4	–	6	–	0
Colorado State	0	–	4	–	0	4	–	6	–	0
$ – Conference champion

The 1969 Arizona State Sun Devils football team was an American football team that represented Arizona State University in the Western Athletic Conference (WAC) during the 1969 NCAA University Division football season. In their 12th season under head coach Frank Kush, the Sun Devils compiled an 8–2 record (6–1 against WAC opponents), won the WAC championship, and outscored their opponents by a combined total of 383 to 179.

The team's statistical leaders included Joe Spagnola with 1,488 passing yards, Dave Buchanan with 908 rushing yards, and Calvin Demery with 816 receiving yards.

== Schedule ==
Date	Opponent	Rank	Site	Result	Attendance	Source
September 20	No. 19 Minnesota*		Sun Devil Stadium; Tempe, AZ	W 48–26	50,202	
September 27	Oregon State*	No. 18	Sun Devil Stadium; Tempe, AZ	L 7–30	50,025	
October 4	BYU		Sun Devil Stadium; Tempe, AZ	W 23–7	34,102	
October 11	at Utah		Ute Stadium; Salt Lake City, UT	L 23–24	19,428	
October 18	at San Jose State*		Spartan Stadium; San Jose, CA	W 45–11	11,893	
November 1	No. 15 Wyoming		Sun Devil Stadium; Tempe, AZ	W 30–14	48,000	
November 8	at New Mexico		University Stadium; Albuquerque, NM	W 48–17	10,903	
November 15	at UTEP		Sun Bowl; El Paso, TX	W 42–19	16,362	
November 22	Colorado State		Sun Devil Stadium; Tempe, AZ	W 79–7	34,682	
November 29	Arizona		Sun Devil Stadium; Tempe, AZ (rivalry)	W 38–24	49,106	
*Non-conference game; Rankings from AP Poll released prior to the game
