= 1969 Long Beach State 49ers football team =

American college football season

1969 Long Beach State 49ers football
- Conference: Pacific Coast Athletic Association
- Record: 8–3 (3–1 PCAA)
- Head coach: Jim Stangeland (1st season)
- Home stadium: Veterans Memorial Stadium

1969 Pacific Coast Athletic Association football standings
	Conf.					Overall
Team	W		L		T	W		L		T
San Diego State $	6	–	0	–	0	11	–	0	–	0
Long Beach State	3	–	1	–	0	8	–	3	–	0
Pacific (CA)	2	–	2	–	0	7	–	3	–	0
San Jose State	1	–	1	–	0	2	–	8	–	0
UC Santa Barbara	1	–	3	–	0	6	–	4	–	0
Fresno State	1	–	3	–	0	6	–	4	–	0
Cal State Los Angeles	0	–	4	–	0	0	–	9	–	0
$ – Conference champion

The 1969 Long Beach State 49ers football team represented California State College, Long Beach—now known as California State University, Long Beach—as a member of the Pacific Coast Athletic Association (PCAA) during the 1969 NCAA College Division football season. This was the team's first year in the newly-formed PCAA after 12 seasons as a member of the California Collegiate Athletic Association (CCAA). Led by first-year head coach Jim Stangeland, the 49ers compiled an overall record of 8–3 with a mark of 3–1 in conference play, placing second in the PCAA. The team played home games at Veterans Memorial Stadium adjacent to the campus of Long Beach City College in Long Beach, California.

== Schedule ==
Date	Opponent	Site	Result	Attendance	Source
September 20	at UC Santa Barbara	Campus Stadium; Santa Barbara, CA	W 32–16	5,000	
September 27	at Texas A&I*	Javelina Stadium; Kingsville, TX	L 7–21	14,000	
October 4	Valley State*	Veterans Memorial Stadium; Long Beach, CA	L 21–32		
October 11	at Hawaii*	Honolulu Stadium; Honolulu, HI	W 28–14	11,515	
October 18	No. 13 Northern Arizona*	Veterans Memorial Stadium; Long Beach, CA	W 23–15	6,000	
October 24	Santa Clara*	Veterans Memorial Stadium; Long Beach, CA	W 34–28	3,551	
November 1	at Cal Poly*	Mustang Stadium; San Luis Obispo, CA	W 22–20	6,700	
November 8	Fresno State	Veterans Memorial Stadium; Long Beach, CA	W 37–7	6,000	
November 15	Cal State Los Angeles	Veterans Memorial Stadium; Long Beach, CA	W 42–0	7,000	
November 22	San Francisco State*	Veterans Memorial Stadium; Long Beach, CA	W 41–0	1,000	
November 29	at San Diego State	San Diego Stadium; San Diego, CA	L 32–36	37,425	
*Non-conference game; Rankings from AP Poll released prior to the game

== Team players in the NFL ==
The following were selected in the 1970 NFL draft.

Player	Position	Round	Overall	NFL team
Billy Parks	Wide receiver	6	146	San Diego Chargers
