= Pete Kettela =

American gridiron football player, coach, and executive (1938–2013)

Biographical details
- Born: May 28, 1938
- Died: September 29, 2013 (aged 75); Flagstaff, Arizona, U.S.

Playing career

Football
- 1959–1961: UC Riverside
- Position: Quarterback

Coaching career (HC unless noted)
- 1965–1969: UC Riverside
- 1970: UC Santa Barbara (OC)
- 1971: Pacific (CA) (assistant)
- 1972–1976: Stanford (assistant)
- 1977: San Jose State (OC)
- 1981: Green Bay Packers (off. asst.)
- 1982: Green Bay Packers (off. backfield)
- 1983: Edmonton Eskimos
- 1984: Arizona Outlaws (receivers)
- 1985: Portland Breakers (OC)
- 1989: UNLV (assistant)
- 1990: Long Beach State (OC)
- 1991: Carolina Cougars
- 1992–2007: Arizona Rattlers (assistant)

Administrative career (AD unless noted)
- 1978–1980: Green Bay Packers (scout)
- 1992–2007: Arizona Rattlers (dir. player pers.)

Head coaching record
- Overall: 23–19–2 (college); 4–4 (CFL)

Peter P. Kettela (May 28, 1938 – September 29, 2013) was an American gridiron football player, coach, and executive. He served as the head football coach at the University of California, Riverside from 1965 to 1969 and as the head coach for the Edmonton Eskimos of the Canadian Football League (CFL) in 1983.

== Athletic career ==
Kettela played football, baseball, and basketball at UC Riverside from 1959 to 1961. He was the starting quarterback for the Highlanders during their undefeated 1960 season and was named to that year's Small College All-American team. Kettela was inducted into the UC Riverside Athletic Hall of Fame on June 12, 1986 as a member of the Hall's first class.

== Coaching career ==
Kettela served as the offensive coordinator at University of California, Santa Barbara in 1970 and as an assistant coach at University of the Pacific in 1971 before spending five seasons as a member of the Stanford Cardinal coaching staff and one season as the offensive coordinator at San Jose State. In 1978, Kettela moved joined the Green Bay Packers of the National Football League (NFL) as a scout. In 1981, he joined the coaching staff as special offensive assistant and was promoted to offensive backfield coach the following year.

In 1983, Kettela replaced Hugh Campbell as the head coach of the Edmonton Eskimos. He was fired after the defending Grey Cup champions got off to a 4–4 start and was replaced by former Eskimos quarterback Jackie Parker.

The following season, Kettela served as an assistant coach with Arizona Outlaws of the United States Football League. In 1985, he was the offensive coordinator of the USFL's Portland Breakers. Kettela served as an assistant at UNLV in 1989 and in 1990 he was the offensive coordinator under Pro Football Hall of Famer George Allen at Long Beach State. Following Allen's death, he was a candidate for the head coaching job that ultimately went to Willie Brown. In 1991, Kettela was named head coach of Carolina Cougars of the Professional Spring Football League. The league folded before a game was ever played.

From 1992 to 2007, Kettela was the Director of Player Personnel and an assistant coach for the Arizona Rattlers of the Arena Football League. During his tenure with the Rattlers, the team appeared in the ArenaBowl five times, winning twice.

Kettela retired to Flagstaff, Arizona. He died on September 29, 2013.

== Head coaching record ==
=== College ===
Year	Team	Overall	Conference	Standing	Bowl/playoffs
UC Riverside Highlanders (NCAA College Division independent) (1965–1968)
1965	UC Riverside	6–2			
1966	UC Riverside	4–5			
1967	UC Riverside	4–4–1			
1968	UC Riverside	6–2–1			
UC Riverside Highlanders (California Collegiate Athletic Association) (1969)
1969	UC Riverside	3–6	0–1	4th	
UC Riverside:		23–19–2	0–1		
Total:		23–19–2			
