= 1969 UC Santa Barbara Gauchos football team =

American college football season

1969 UC Santa Barbara Gauchos football
- Conference: Pacific Coast Athletic Association
- Record: 6–4 (1–3 PCAA)
- Head coach: Jack Curtice (7th season)
- Home stadium: Campus Stadium

1969 Pacific Coast Athletic Association football standings
	Conf.					Overall
Team	W		L		T	W		L		T
San Diego State $	6	–	0	–	0	11	–	0	–	0
Long Beach State	3	–	1	–	0	8	–	3	–	0
Pacific (CA)	2	–	2	–	0	7	–	3	–	0
San Jose State	1	–	1	–	0	2	–	8	–	0
UC Santa Barbara	1	–	3	–	0	6	–	4	–	0
Fresno State	1	–	3	–	0	6	–	4	–	0
Cal State Los Angeles	0	–	4	–	0	0	–	9	–	0
$ – Conference champion

The 1969 UC Santa Barbara Gauchos football team represented the University of California, Santa Barbara (UCSB) as a member of the Pacific Coast Athletic Association (PCAA) during the 1969 NCAA College Division football season. Led by Jack Curtice in his seventh and final season as head coach, the Gauchos compiled an overall record of 6–4 with a mark of 1–3 in conference play, tying for fifth place in the PCAA. The team played home games at Campus Stadium in Santa Barbara, California.

== Schedule ==
Date	Time	Opponent	Site	Result	Attendance	Source
September 20		Long Beach State	Campus Stadium; Santa Barbara, CA	L 16–32	5,000	
September 27		Nevada*	Campus Stadium; Santa Barbara, CA	W 21–6	4,500	
October 4		at Whittier*	Memorial Stadium; Whittier, CA	W 21–19	1,500	
October 11	8:00 p.m.	at Pacific (CA)	Pacific Memorial Stadium; Stockton, CA	L 0–38	9,206	
October 18		Valley State*	Campus Stadium; Santa Barbara, CA	W 26–2	6,000	
October 25		at San Diego State	San Diego Stadium; San Diego, CA	L 13–53	47,605	
November 1		Santa Clara*	Campus Stadium; Santa Barbara, CA	L 7–27	5,000	
November 8		Cal State Los Angeles	Campus Stadium; Santa Barbara, CA	W 28–6	4,000–4,500	
November 15		at Cal Poly*	Mustang Stadium; San Luis Obispo, CA	W 9–7	5,100	
November 22		at Hawaii*	Honolulu Stadium; Honolulu, HI	W 21–16	15,290	
*Non-conference game; All times are in Pacific time
