= 1969 Colorado State Rams football team =

American college football season

1969 Colorado State Rams football
- Conference: Western Athletic Conference
- Record: 4–6 (0–4 WAC)
- Head coach: Mike Lude (8th season)
- Home stadium: Hughes Stadium

1969 Western Athletic Conference football standings
	Conf.					Overall
Team	W		L		T	W		L		T
Arizona State $	6	–	1	–	0	8	–	2	–	0
Utah	5	–	1	–	0	8	–	2	–	0
BYU	4	–	3	–	0	6	–	4	–	0
Wyoming	4	–	3	–	0	6	–	4	–	0
Arizona	3	–	3	–	0	3	–	7	–	0
UTEP	2	–	5	–	0	4	–	6	–	0
New Mexico	1	–	5	–	0	4	–	6	–	0
Colorado State	0	–	4	–	0	4	–	6	–	0
$ – Conference champion

The 1969 Colorado State Rams football team represented Colorado State University in the Western Athletic Conference during the 1969 NCAA University Division football season. In their eighth season under head coach Mike Lude, the Rams compiled a 4–6 record.

== Schedule ==
Date	Time	Opponent	Site	Result	Attendance	Source
September 20		at BYU	Cougar Stadium; Provo, UT	L 20–22	29,317	
September 27	1:30 p.m.	Wichita State*	Hughes Stadium; Fort Collins, CO	W 50–21	20,751	
October 4		at No. 19 Wyoming	War Memorial Stadium; Laramie, WY (rivalry)	L 3–39	15,140	
October 11		at Utah State*	Romney Stadium; Logan, UT	W 37–33	8,497	
October 18	1:30 p.m.	West Texas State*^{†}	Hughes Stadium; Fort Collins, CO	W 27–7	17,360	
October 25		at No. 20 Air Force*	Falcon Stadium; Colorado Springs, CO (rivalry)	L 7–28	23,359	
November 1		UTEP	Hughes Stadium; Fort Collins, CO	L 16–17	11,340	
November 15		Idaho*	Hughes Stadium; Fort Collins, CO	W 31–21	13,693	
November 22		at Arizona State	Sun Devil Stadium; Tempe, AZ	L 7–79	34,682	
November 27		at New Mexico State*	Memorial Stadium; Las Cruces, NM	L 20–21	5,280	
*Non-conference game; ^{†}Homecoming; Rankings from Coaches' Poll released prior to the game; All times are in Mountain time

== Roster ==
1969 Colorado State Rams football team roster
Players			Coaches
Offense: Pos. / # / Name / Class; RB / 30 / Lawrence McCutcheon / So	Defense: Pos. / # / Name / Class; CB / 45 / Earlie Thomas / Sr	Special teams: Pos. / # / Name / Class; P / 10 / Ted Hill / So	Head coach: Mike Lude; Coordinators/assistant coaches Legend: (C) Team captain; (S) Suspended; (I) Ineligible; Injured; Redshirt
