= 1969 Arizona Wildcats football team =

American college football season

1969 Arizona Wildcats football
- Conference: Western Athletic Conference
- Record: 3–7 (3–3 WAC)
- Head coach: Bob Weber (1st season)
- Home stadium: Arizona Stadium

1969 Western Athletic Conference football standings
	Conf.					Overall
Team	W		L		T	W		L		T
Arizona State $	6	–	1	–	0	8	–	2	–	0
Utah	5	–	1	–	0	8	–	2	–	0
BYU	4	–	3	–	0	6	–	4	–	0
Wyoming	4	–	3	–	0	6	–	4	–	0
Arizona	3	–	3	–	0	3	–	7	–	0
UTEP	2	–	5	–	0	4	–	6	–	0
New Mexico	1	–	5	–	0	4	–	6	–	0
Colorado State	0	–	4	–	0	4	–	6	–	0
$ – Conference champion

The 1969 Arizona Wildcats football team represented the University of Arizona in the Western Athletic Conference (WAC) during the 1969 NCAA University Division football season. In their first season under head coach Bob Weber, the Wildcats compiled a 3–7 record (3–3 against WAC opponents), finished in fifth place in the WAC, and were outscored by their opponents, 276 to 219. The team played its home games in Arizona Stadium in Tucson, Arizona.

Weber replaced Darrell Mudra, who left Arizona to become the head coach at Western Illinois at the end of the 1968 season. Without Mudra in charge, the Wildcats struggled heavily, which led to Arizona losing its first four games of the 1969 season and only winning only three games all year.

The team's statistical leaders included Brian Linstrom with 1,598 passing yards, Ron Gardin with 759 rushing yards, and Hal Arnason with 489 receiving yards.

== Schedule ==
Date	Opponent	Site	Result	Attendance	Source
September 20	at Wyoming	War Memorial Stadium; Laramie, WY	L 7–23	20,400	
September 27	Kansas State*	Arizona Stadium; Tucson, AZ	L 27–42	38,750	
October 4	at Iowa*	Iowa Stadium; Iowa City, IA	L 19–31	47,391	
October 11	Houston*	Arizona Stadium; Tucson, AZ	L 17–34	32,800	
October 18	UTEP	Arizona Stadium; Tucson, AZ	W 26–10	30,000	
October 25	New Mexico	Arizona Stadium; Tucson, AZ (rivalry)	W 52–28	31,500	
November 1	at BYU	Cougar Stadium; Provo, UT	L 21–31	28,941	
November 8	at Syracuse*	Archbold Stadium; Syracuse, NY	L 0–23	24,346	
November 15	Utah	Arizona Stadium; Tucson, AZ	W 17–16	23,400	
November 29	at Arizona State	Sun Devil Stadium; Tempe, AZ (rivalry)	L 24–38	49,106	
*Non-conference game
