= 1969 Utah Utes football team =

American college football season

1969 Utah Utes football
- Conference: Western Athletic Conference
- Record: 8–2 (5–1 WAC)
- Head coach: Bill Meek (2nd season)
- Defensive coordinator: Jim LaRue (2nd season)
- Home stadium: Ute Stadium

1969 Western Athletic Conference football standings
	Conf.					Overall
Team	W		L		T	W		L		T
Arizona State $	6	–	1	–	0	8	–	2	–	0
Utah	5	–	1	–	0	8	–	2	–	0
BYU	4	–	3	–	0	6	–	4	–	0
Wyoming	4	–	3	–	0	6	–	4	–	0
Arizona	3	–	3	–	0	3	–	7	–	0
UTEP	2	–	5	–	0	4	–	6	–	0
New Mexico	1	–	5	–	0	4	–	6	–	0
Colorado State	0	–	4	–	0	4	–	6	–	0
$ – Conference champion

The 1969 Utah Utes football team, or also commonly known as the Utah Redskins, was an American football team that represented the University of Utah as a member of the Western Athletic Conference (WAC) during the 1969 NCAA University Division football season. In their second season under head coach Bill Meek, the Utes compiled an overall record of 8–2 with a mark of 5–1 against conference opponents, placing fifth in the WAC. Home games were played on campus at Ute Stadium in Salt Lake City.

== Schedule ==
Date	Time	Opponent	Site	Result	Attendance	Source
September 20		Oregon*	Ute Stadium; Salt Lake City, UT	L 17–28	17,000	
September 27	8:00 p.m.	San Jose State*	Ute Stadium; Salt Lake City, UT	W 42–7	22,078	
October 4		at UTEP	Sun Bowl; El Paso, TX	W 24–6	22,470	
October 11		Arizona State*	Ute Stadium; Salt Lake City, UT	W 24–23	19,428	
October 18	7:30 p.m.	at New Mexico	University Stadium; Albuquerque, NM	W 24–0	13,681	
October 25		at Oregon State*	Civic Stadium; Portland, OR	W 7–3	27,910	
November 1		Utah State*^{†}	Ute Stadium; Salt Lake City, UT (rivalry)	W 27–7	22,699	
November 8	1:30 p.m.	Wyoming	Ute Stadium; Salt Lake City, UT	W 34–10	29,416	
November 15		at Arizona	Arizona Stadium; Tucson, AZ	L 16–17	23,400	
November 22	1:30 p.m.	at BYU	Cougar Stadium; Provo, UT (rivalry)	W 16–6	35,790	
*Non-conference game; ^{†}Homecoming; All times are in Mountain time

== Roster ==
1969 Utah Utes football team roster
Players
Coaches
Offense

Pos.	#	Name	Class
QB	12	Ray Groth	Sr
G	73	Gordon Jolley	Jr
TE	80	Dale Nosworthy	Jr
RB	42	Dave Smith	Sr

Defense

Pos.	#	Name	Class
DB	43	Norm Thompson	Jr

Special teams

Pos.	#	Name	Class
P	81	Marv Bateman	So

Head coach

- Bill Meek

Coordinators/assistant coaches

Legend

- (C) Team captain
- (S) Suspended
- (I) Ineligible
- Injured
- Redshirt

== NFL draft ==
Two Utah players were selected in the 1970 NFL draft.

Player	Position	Round	Pick	NFL team
Dave Smith	Running back	13	328	Green Bay Packers
Ray Groth	Wide receiver	14	345	St. Louis Cardinals
