= 1969 Cal State Los Angeles Diablos football team =

American college football season

1969 Cal State Los Angeles Diablos football
- Conference: Pacific Coast Athletic Association
- Record: 0–9 (0–4 PCAA)
- Head coach: Walt Thurmond (1st season)
- Home stadium: Rose Bowl

1969 Pacific Coast Athletic Association football standings
	Conf.					Overall
Team	W		L		T	W		L		T
San Diego State $	6	–	0	–	0	11	–	0	–	0
Long Beach State	3	–	1	–	0	8	–	3	–	0
Pacific (CA)	2	–	2	–	0	7	–	3	–	0
San Jose State	1	–	1	–	0	2	–	8	–	0
UC Santa Barbara	1	–	3	–	0	6	–	4	–	0
Fresno State	1	–	3	–	0	6	–	4	–	0
Cal State Los Angeles	0	–	4	–	0	0	–	9	–	0
$ – Conference champion

The 1969 Cal State Los Angeles Diablos football team represented California State College at Los Angeles—now known as California State University, Los Angeles—as a member of the Pacific Coast Athletic Association (PCAA) during the 1969 NCAA College Division football season. Led by Walt Thurmond in his first and only season as head coach, the team compiled an overall record of 0–9 with a mark of 0–4 in conference play, placing last out of seven teams in the PCAA. The Diablos were shut out four times and scored only 67 points for the season while allowing up 329. Cal State Los Angeles played home games at the Rose Bowl in Pasadena, California.

== Schedule ==
Date	Opponent	Site	Result	Attendance	Source
September 27	at San Diego State	San Diego Stadium; San Diego, CA	L 0–49	38,000–38,258	
October 4	at Cal Poly Pomona*	Kellogg Field; Pomona, CA	L 13–14	1,500–3,000	
October 11	No. 11 Northern Arizona*	Rose Bowl; Pasadena, CA	L 14–20	1,147–3,000	
October 25	at Fresno State	Ratcliffe Stadium; Fresno, CA	L 0–24	6,000–9,303	
November 1	at Hawaii*	Honolulu Stadium; Honolulu, HI	L 28–52	11,000–20,223	
November 8	at UC Santa Barbara	Campus Stadium; Santa Barbara, CA	L 6–28	4,000–4,500	
November 15	at Long Beach State	Veterans Stadium; Long Beach, CA	L 0–42	7,000	
November 22	at Tampa*	Tampa Stadium; Tampa, FL	L 0–53	10,352–11,000	
November 29	Valley State*	Rose Bowl; Pasadena, CA	L 6–47	1,371–2,000	
*Non-conference game; Rankings from AP Poll released prior to the game
