= Lloyd Eaton =

American football player, coach, and executive (1918–2007)

Biographical details
- Born: March 23, 1918
- Died: March 14, 2007 (aged 88); Nampa, Idaho, U.S.

Playing career
- 1938–1939: Black Hills State
- Position: End

Coaching career (HC unless noted)
- 1940: Black Hills State (line)
- 1949–1955: Alma
- 1956: Northern Michigan
- 1957–1961: Wyoming (DL)
- 1962–1970: Wyoming

Administrative career (AD unless noted)
- 1970–1980?: Green Bay Packers (dir. of player pers.)

Head coaching record
- Overall: 104–53–5 (college)
- Bowls: 1–1

Accomplishments and honors

Championships
- 2 MIAA (1950–1951); 3 WAC (1966–1968)

Awards
- 2× WAC Coach of the Year (1966, 1967)

Lloyd W. Eaton (March 23, 1918 – March 14, 2007) was an American football player, coach, and executive. He served as the head coach at Alma College (1949–1955), Northern Michigan University (1956), and the University of Wyoming (1962–1970), compiling a career college football record of 104–53–4. Eaton then worked as the director of player personnel for the Green Bay Packers of the National Football League (NFL). Despite winning five conference championships with two teams, he is perhaps most known for his decision to kick 14 black players off of the Wyoming football team for discussing a protest against discrimination in 1969 that is referred to as the "Black 14" incident.

== Early years ==
Growing up in Belle Fourche, South Dakota, Eaton was an outstanding football, track, and boxing athlete at Belle Fourche High School. He graduated from Black Hills State Teachers College where he played end and became captain of the team in his junior year.

== Coaching career ==
Eaton remained at Black Hills after graduation, becoming the line coach there for one year. He then coached football at Dupree High School for several years leading up to his service in World War II.

Following the war, he returned to coaching at Bennett County High School in Martin, South Dakota, and then earned a master's degree at the University of Michigan. There he coached the 150-pound football team.

He began doctoral studies at Indiana University Bloomington, then moved on to coach football at Alma College in Michigan. His teams won the 1950 and 1951 Michigan Intercollegiate Athletic Association championship titles, and he compiled a record of 40–20–2. His influence there was felt by player Denny Stolz, who later became a successful coach.

Eaton was a detail-oriented disciplinarian who made a name for himself by introducing new techniques that helped smaller defensive linemen. "[Smaller defensive linemen] became very popular as a result," recalled Paul Roach, Eaton's assistant at Wyoming. "I think this became somewhat of a springboard for him to be elevated as a head football coach, and he certainly had an outstanding career as a head football coach".

Eaton left Alma in 1956 and coached at Northern Michigan University for one year.

=== Wyoming ===
From 1957 to 1961, Eaton served as defensive line coach at the University of Wyoming, and in 1962, he succeeded Bob Devaney as head coach there. In that role, he became one of the university's most successful coaches, compiling a record of 57–33–2. His greatest success came in the 1966, 1967, and 1968 seasons. In those three years, the team posted back-to-back 10–1 seasons, including a 14-game winning streak from November 5, 1966 to January 1, 1968, then followed this by going 7-3 in the 1968 regular season. His teams won the 1966 Sun Bowl and played in the 1968 Sugar Bowl.

==== "Black 14" controversy ====
In 1969, during the "Black 14" incident, Eaton dismissed 14 black Wyoming players from the team for planning to wear black armbands during a game against the BYU Cougars. At a victory against BYU the previous year, players from the Cougars had subjected them to racial epithets. A week before the upcoming game, the team's black members were reminded of the incident and also informed about the racial policies of the Church of Jesus Christ of Latter-day Saints (which owns and operates BYU, and which up until 1978 excluded black people from the church's priesthood as well as any temple ceremonies - also had been proscribed from proxy baptisms on behalf of the dead by David O McKay unlike his predecessors that permitted them for blacks) by Willie Black, leader of Wyoming's Black Student Alliance, and challenged them to do something about it. The day before the game, the players approached coach Eaton to tell him that they were planning to wear black armbands during the game in protest; Eaton forbade it. The players then arranged to meet with Eaton, intending to discuss with him the terms of their protest. According to Joe Williams, a team co-captain before he was suspended from the team, "We wanted to see if we could wear black armbands in the game, or black socks, or black X's on our helmets. And if he had said no we had already agreed that we would be willing to protest with nothing but our black skins."

Eaton took them to the bleachers in the old fieldhouse. Eaton says he listened to their suggestions for ten minutes before deciding to dismiss them from the team. Williams gives a very different account: "He [Eaton] came in, sneered at us and yelled that we were off the squad. He said our very presence defied him. He said he has had some good Negro boys. Just like that." Defensive end Tony McGee said that Eaton "said we could go to Grambling State or Morgan State ... We could go back to colored relief. If anyone said anything, he told us to shut up. We were really protesting policies we thought were racist. Maybe we should've been protesting there." John Griffin, a wide receiver, corroborates McGee's memory.

At San Jose State University, the team voted to wear multicolored armbands against Wyoming in support of the 14, and groups at other Western Athletic Conference schools demanded that Wyoming be dropped from their schedules. At the time of the incident, the team was undefeated (4–0) and ranked No. 12 in the nation. Even though Wyoming beat BYU and then San Jose State in the next game without the players, the Cowboys lost the last four games of 1969 season and went 1–9 the next year, which prompted the school to fire Eaton.

The "Black 14" incident spurred the court case Williams v. Eaton, with the issue of free speech against the principle of separation of church and state. Litigation was lengthy for this case and ended on October 31, 1972.

== NFL executive and scout ==
In 1972, Eaton became the director of player personnel for the Green Bay Packers of the National Football League (NFL). He was demoted to a scouting position four years later. He later served as the western regional director for the BLESTO player rating service of the NFL, before retiring in the mid-1980s.

== Honors ==
Eaton was elected to the Alma Athletic Hall of Fame in 1973 and the Wyoming Coaches Association Hall of Fame in 1984.

== Personal life and death ==
Eaton was once married and divorced, living purposefully without a phone. He died at the age of 88, on March 14, 2007 in Nampa, Idaho.

== Head coaching record ==
=== College ===
Year	Team	Overall	Conference	Standing	Bowl/playoffs	Coaches^{#}	AP^{°}
Alma Scots (Michigan Intercollegiate Athletic Association) (1949–1955)
1949	Alma	5–2–1	2–2–1	T–3rd			
1950	Alma	6–2–1	4–0–1	1st			
1951	Alma	7–2	4–1	T–1st			
1952	Alma	4–4	2–3	T–3rd			
1953	Alma	7–2	4–2	3rd			
1954	Alma	6–4	2–4	5th			
1955	Alma	5–4	3–3	T–3rd			
Alma:		40–20–2	21–15–2				
Northern Michigan Wildcats (Independent) (1956)
1956	Northern Michigan	7–0–1					
Northern Michigan:		7–0–1					
Wyoming Cowboys (Western Athletic Conference) (1962–1970)
1962	Wyoming	5–5	2–2	T–2nd			
1963	Wyoming	6–4	2–3	5th			
1964	Wyoming	6–2–2	2–2	4th			
1965	Wyoming	6–4	3–2	3rd			
1966	Wyoming	10–1	5–0	1st	W Sun	15	
1967	Wyoming	10–1	5–0	1st	L Sugar	5	6
1968	Wyoming	7–3	6–1	1st			
1969	Wyoming	6–4	4–3	T–3rd			
1970	Wyoming	1–9	1–6	T–7th			
Wyoming:		57–33–2	32–19				
Total:		104–53–5					
National championship Conference title Conference division title or championship game berth
^{#}Rankings from final Coaches Poll.; ^{°}Rankings from final AP Poll.
