= Sustainable Endowments Institute =

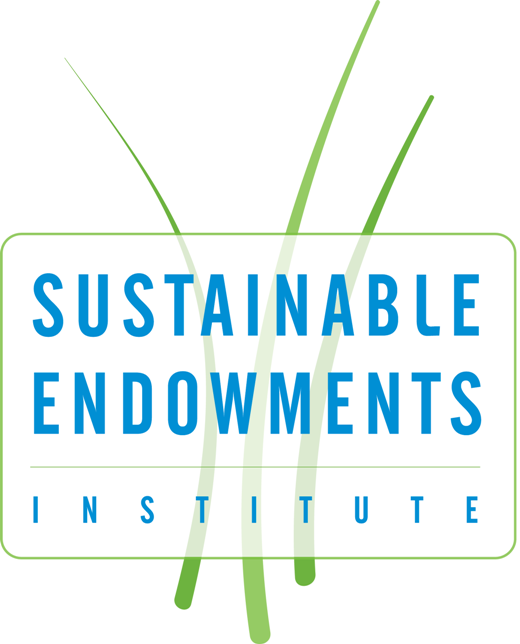
- Founder: Mark Orlowski
- Type: research and education
- Location: Boston, MA

The Sustainable Endowments Institute (SEI) is a nonprofit organization based in the United States that is engaged in research and education to advance sustainability in operations and endowment practices. Founded in 2005, SEI is a special project of Rockefeller Philanthropy Advisors. SEI is located in Boston, Massachusetts.

== Projects ==
=== College Sustainability Report Card ===
The College Sustainability Report Card, called the Green Report Card, was the first sustainability ranking survey inside higher education. SEI released the College Sustainability Report Card between 2006 and 2012. The sustainability survey collaborated with over 300 schools in North America, sampling colleges and universities in all 50 states and 8 Canadian provinces. The Report Card has been covered in numerous media outlets, including The New York Times, BusinessWeek, Forbes, and CNN Money. The project surveyed administrators, students, and campus community members on 9 sustainability-related categories: administration, climate change and energy, food and recycling, green building, student involvement, transportation, endowment transparency, investment priorities, and stakeholder engagement. SEI supplemented these surveys with publicly available information to assess a grade, from an F to an A, for each institution based on the total number of points earned for each category. The Report Card was indefinitely suspended on March 30, 2012.

=== The Billion Dollar Green Challenge ===
The Billion Dollar Green Challenge (The Challenge) is an initiative to promote the revolving loan fund model to finance sustainability projects on college, university, and other nonprofit institutional campuses. The initiative advocates for increased investment in efficient energy use and sustainable efficiency improvements, with a goal one billion dollars in self-managed revolving funds called green revolving funds. The Billion Dollar Green Challenge program was covered in a cover story in Business Officer magazine published by the National Association of College and University Business Officers (NACUBO).

=== The Green Revolving Investment Tracking System ===
The Green Revolving Investment Tracking System (GRITS) is an online web application that allows organizations to track and calculate project-level energy, financial, and carbon data. The tool was developed by the Institute between October 2011 and April 2014, with the GRITS 1.0 version launched on Earth Day, April 22, 2014. GRITS was featured in a New York Times article "Investing in Energy Efficiency Pays Off" in February 2015.
