= 1969 Pacific Tigers football team =

American college football season

1969 Pacific Tigers football
- Conference: Pacific Coast Athletic Association
- Record: 7–3 (2–2 PCAA)
- Head coach: Doug Scovil (4th season)
- Home stadium: Pacific Memorial Stadium

1969 Pacific Coast Athletic Association football standings
| | Conf. | | | | | Overall |
| Team | W | | L | | T | W | | L | | T |
|---|---|---|---|---|---|---|---|---|---|---|
| San Diego State $ | 6 | – | 0 | – | 0 | 11 | – | 0 | – | 0 |
| Long Beach State | 3 | – | 1 | – | 0 | 8 | – | 3 | – | 0 |
| Pacific (CA) | 2 | – | 2 | – | 0 | 7 | – | 3 | – | 0 |
| San Jose State | 1 | – | 1 | – | 0 | 2 | – | 8 | – | 0 |
| UC Santa Barbara | 1 | – | 3 | – | 0 | 6 | – | 4 | – | 0 |
| Fresno State | 1 | – | 3 | – | 0 | 6 | – | 4 | – | 0 |
| Cal State Los Angeles | 0 | – | 4 | – | 0 | 0 | – | 9 | – | 0 |
$ – Conference champion

The 1969 Pacific Tigers football team represented the University of the Pacific (UOP) as a member of the Pacific Coast Athletic Association (PCAA) during the 1969 NCAA University Division football season. Led by Doug Scovil in his fourth and final season as head coach, the Tigers compiled an overall record of 7–3 with a mark of 2–2 in conference play, tying for third place in the PCAA. Pacific outscored opponents 284 to 146, including three shutouts. The team played home games at Pacific Memorial Stadium in Stockton, California.

Pacific was a charter member of the PCAA after having competed as an independent for the 20 previous seasons.

== Schedule ==
| Date | Time | Opponent | Site | Result | Attendance | Source |
|---|---|---|---|---|---|---|
| September 13 | 6:30 p.m. | at UTEP* | Sun Bowl; El Paso, TX | L 10–14 | 22,135 | |
| September 20 | 8:00 p.m. | Western Michigan* | Pacific Memorial Stadium; Stockton, CA | W 21–0 | 9,200 | |
| September 27 | 12:30 p.m. | at Utah State* | Romney Stadium; Logan, UT | W 36–3 | 10,137 | |
| October 4 | 8:00 p.m. | Fresno State | Pacific Memorial Stadium; Stockton, CA | W 40–21 | 15,211 | |
| October 11 | 8:00 p.m. | UC Santa Barbara | Pacific Memorial Stadium; Stockton, CA | W 38–0 | 9,206 | |
| October 18 | 2:00 p.m. | Idaho*^{†} | Pacific Memorial Stadium; Stockton, CA | W 28–0 | 16,142–16,500 | |
| November 1 | 1:30 p.m. | at Washington State* | Rogers Field; Pullman, WA | W 27–20 | 16,000 | |
| November 8 | 8:04 p.m. | at San Diego State | San Diego Stadium; San Diego, CA | L 32–58 | 48,632 | |
| November 15 | | at Santa Clara* | Buck Shaw Stadium; Santa Clara, CA | W 40–15 | 9,872 | |
| November 22 | | at San Jose State | Spartan Stadium; San Jose, CA (Victory Bell) | L 12–15 | 8,147 | |
*Non-conference game; ^{†}Homecoming; All times are in Pacific time

== Team players in the NFL ==
The following UOP players were selected in the 1970 NFL draft.

| Player | Position | Round | Overall | NFL team |
| Tony Plummer | Defensive back | 10 | 242 | St. Louis Cardinals |
