= 1969 San Jose State Spartans football team =

American college football season

1969 San Jose State Spartans football
- Conference: Pacific Coast Athletic Association
- Record: 2–8 (1–1 PCAA)
- Head coach: Joe McMullen (1st season)
- Home stadium: Spartan Stadium

1969 Pacific Coast Athletic Association football standings
	Conf.					Overall
Team	W		L		T	W		L		T
San Diego State $	6	–	0	–	0	11	–	0	–	0
Long Beach State	3	–	1	–	0	8	–	3	–	0
Pacific (CA)	2	–	2	–	0	7	–	3	–	0
San Jose State	1	–	1	–	0	2	–	8	–	0
UC Santa Barbara	1	–	3	–	0	6	–	4	–	0
Fresno State	1	–	3	–	0	6	–	4	–	0
Cal State Los Angeles	0	–	4	–	0	0	–	9	–	0
$ – Conference champion

The 1969 San Jose State Spartans football team represented San Jose State College (Note: San Jose State University was known as San Jose State College from 1935 to 1971.) during the 1969 NCAA University Division football season.

San Jose State's 1969 season was part of the inaugural season for the Pacific Coast Athletic Association. (Note: The Big West Conference was known as the Pacific Coast Athletic Association from its founding in 1969 through 1987.) The team was led by head coach Joe McMullen, in his first year, and played home games at Spartan Stadium in San Jose, California. They finished the season with a record of two wins and eight losses (2–8, 1–1 PCAA).

== Schedule ==
Date	Time	Opponent	Site	Result	Attendance	Source
September 20	1:30 p.m.	at No. 16 Stanford*	Stanford Stadium; Stanford, CA (rivalry)	L 21–63	31,000	
September 27	7:15 p.m.	at Utah*	Ute Stadium; Salt Lake City, UT	L 7–42	22,078	
October 4	8:00 p.m.	San Diego State	Spartan Stadium; San Jose, CA	L 21–55	9,271	
October 11	1:30 p.m.	at Oregon*	Autzen Stadium; Eugene, OR	W 36–34	21,500	
October 18		Arizona State*	Spartan Stadium; San Jose, CA	L 11–45	11,893	
October 25		at No. 16 Wyoming*	War Memorial Stadium; Laramie, WY	L 7–16	18,791	
November 1	2:00 p.m.	New Mexico*^{†}	Spartan Stadium; San Jose, CA	L 24–27	9,132	
November 8	12:30 p.m.	at BYU*	Cougar Stadium; Provo, UT	L 3–21	23,412	
November 15	1:31 p.m.	at California*	California Memorial Stadium; Berkeley, CA	L 7–31	18,000	
November 22		Pacific (CA)	Spartan Stadium; San Jose, CA (Victory Bell)	W 15–12	8,147	
*Non-conference game; ^{†}Homecoming; Rankings from AP Poll released prior to the game

== Team players in the NFL ==
The following San Jose State players were selected in the 1970 NFL draft.

Player	Position	Round	Overall	NFL team
John Carlos	Wide receiver	15	371	Philadelphia Eagles
