= 1969 BYU Cougars football team =

American college football season

1969 BYU Cougars football
- Conference: Western Athletic Conference
- Record: 6–4 (4–3 WAC)
- Head coach: Tommy Hudspeth (6th season)
- Home stadium: Cougar Stadium

1969 Western Athletic Conference football standings
	Conf.					Overall
Team	W		L		T	W		L		T
Arizona State $	6	–	1	–	0	8	–	2	–	0
Utah	5	–	1	–	0	8	–	2	–	0
BYU	4	–	3	–	0	6	–	4	–	0
Wyoming	4	–	3	–	0	6	–	4	–	0
Arizona	3	–	3	–	0	3	–	7	–	0
UTEP	2	–	5	–	0	4	–	6	–	0
New Mexico	1	–	5	–	0	4	–	6	–	0
Colorado State	0	–	4	–	0	4	–	6	–	0
$ – Conference champion

The 1969 BYU Cougars football team was an American football team that represented Brigham Young University (BYU) as a member of the Western Athletic Conference (WAC) during the 1969 NCAA University Division football season. In their sixth season under head coach Tommy Hudspeth, the Cougars compiled an overall record of 6–4 with a mark of 4–3 against conference opponents, tied for third place in the WAC, and outscored opponents by a total of 186 to 158.

== Schedule ==
Date	Time	Opponent	Site	Result	Attendance	Source
September 20		Colorado State	Cougar Stadium; Provo, UT	W 22–20	29,317	
September 27		at Iowa State*	Clyde Williams Field; Ames, IA	L 0–10	28,232	
October 4		at Arizona State	Sun Devil Stadium; Tempe, AZ	L 7–23	34,102	
October 11		New Mexico	Cougar Stadium; Provo, UT	W 41–15	25,565	
October 18		at No. 16 Wyoming	War Memorial Stadium; Laramie, WY	L 7–40	14,993	
October 25		at UTEP	Sun Bowl; El Paso, TX	W 30–7	19,520	
November 1		Arizona^{†}	Cougar Stadium; Provo, UT	W 31–21	28,941	
November 8	1:30 p.m.	San Jose State*	Cougar Stadium; Provo, UT	W 21–3	23,412	
November 15		at Utah State*	Romney Stadium; Logan, UT (rivalry)	W 21–3	15,123	
November 22		Utah	Cougar Stadium; Provo, UT (rivalry)	L 6–16	35,790	
*Non-conference game; ^{†}Homecoming; Rankings from AP Poll released prior to the game; All times are in Mountain time

== Roster ==
1969 BYU Cougars football team roster
Players			Coaches
Offense: Pos. / # / Name / Class	Defense: Pos. / # / Name / Class; DB / 19 / Chris Farasopoulos / Jr	Special teams: Pos. / # / Name / Class	Head coach: Tommy Hudspeth; Coordinators/assistant coaches Legend: (C) Team captain; (S) Suspended; (I) Ineligible; Injured; Redshirt; Roster
