= NCAA University Division =

The NCAA University Division was a historic subdivision of the National Collegiate Athletic Association (NCAA) consisting of member schools competing at the highest level of college sports. The University Division was first established as a basis for determining eligibility to participate in the 1957 NCAA University Division basketball tournament. It was replaced in 1973 with the creation of NCAA Division I.

== Origin ==
The University Division began for purposes of college basketball. In August 1956, NCAA executive director Walter Byers announced that, starting in 1957, the NCAA would hold separate basketball tournaments for major schools and smaller colleges. Approximately 156 major schools competing in the "University Division" would compete for 24 spots in the University Division tournament, while 285 smaller schools in the "College Division" would compete for 32 spots in a separate tournament.

From its inception, the University Division included all member schools in NCAA-allied conferences, and champions of those conferences automatically qualified to participate in the NCAA University Division basketball tournament. The original allied conferences were:

- Atlantic Coast Conference
- Big Seven Conference
- Big Ten Conference
- Border Conference
- Ivy League
- Metropolitan New York Conference
- Mid-American Conference
- Missouri Valley Conference
- Mountain States Conference
- Ohio Valley Conference
- Pacific Coast Conference
- Southeastern Conference
- Southern Conference
- Southwest Conference
- West Coast Athletic Conference

The first separate "University Division" basketball tournament was held in March 1957.

By December 1957, the ranks of the University Division expanded to 179 universities and colleges.

== Extension to football ==
While the University Division was initially created as a basis for determining eligibility for the basketball tournament, the concept was extended to college football as well. As of 1962, 140 college football teams were recognized as being part of the "University Division" for purposes of football, while another 370 schools were in the "College Division". In 1963, the NCAA began holding regional football championships within the College Division. At that time, 120 of the 419 NCAA football programs were classified as being part of the University Division.

Classification into the University Division for purposes of basketball was broader and included more schools than for purposes of football. For purposes of football, and unlike basketball, classification into the University Division was not automatic based on conference membership.

=== Changes in status ===
For purposes of football, the ranks of the University Division evolved from year to year. Promotion of football programs to the University Division Annual was determined in earlier years by members of the American Football Writers Association, and in later years by an NCAA sanctioning committee. Annual changes in the University Division football membership include the following:

- 1962: Buffalo, Kent State, and Marshall were promoted to the University Division. There were 140 teams playing football in the University Division.
- 1963: Out of 419 NCAA member schools, only 120 football programs were part of the University Division.
- 1967: Idaho and Pacific (CA) were involuntarily dropped to the College Division; both were elevated two years later.
- 1968: Ball State was elevated to the University Division.
- 1969: Northern Illinois and San Diego State were admitted to the University Division, while Idaho and Pacific (CA) returned after two years in the College Division. The promotions increased the University Division to 118 teams for football.
- 1970: The University Division remained stable at 118 teams. The NCAA Football Statistics and Classification Committee recommended that a College Division team not be elevated unless it includes at least five major-college opponents on its upcoming season schedule.
- 1971: Temple and Texas–Arlington were elevated to the University Division.
- 1972: Long Beach State and Tampa were elevated to the University Division.
