= 1969 Defiance Yellow Jackets football team =

American college football season

1966 Defiance Yellow Jackets football

MOC champion
- Conference: Mid-Ohio Conference
- Record: 9–0 (3–0 MOC)
- Head coach: Roger Merb (3rd season)

1969 Mid-Ohio Conference football standings
	Conf.					Overall
Team	W		L		T	W		L		T
No. 16 Defiance $	3	–	0	–	0	9	–	0	–	0
Wilmington (OH)	2	–	1	–	0	3	–	7	–	0
Findlay	1	–	2	–	0	3	–	7	–	0
Bluffton	0	–	3	–	0	0	–	9	–	0
$ – Conference champion; Rankings from NAIA poll

The 1969 Defiance Yellow Jackets football team was an American football team that represented Defiance College as a member of the Mid-Ohio Conference (MOC) during the 1969 NAIA football season. In their third year under head coach Roger Merb, the Yellow Jackets compiled a 9–0 record (3–0 against conference opponents), won the MOC championship, and outscored opponents by a total of 283 to 61.

At the end of the season, Merb was selected as the MOC bootball coach of the year. In addition, 14 Defiance players, including quarterback Jerry Griffith, were named to the 1969 MOC all-star team.

The 1969 season was one of three perfect seasons in Defiance football history, the others being in 1953 and 1966.

== Schedule ==
Date	Opponent	Site	Result	Attendance	Source
September 13	Hope*	Defiance, OH	W 40–7		
September 20	at Adrian*	Adrian, MI	W 49–13		
September 27	Alma*	Defiance, OH	W 14–7		
October 4	at Findlay	Findlay, OH	W 14–13		
October 11	Wilmington (OH)	Defiance, OH	W 31–0		
October 18	Manchester*	Defiance, OH	W 36–6		
October 25	Bluffton	Defiance, OH	W 35–0		
November 1	at Central State*	Wilberforce, OH	W 21–0		
November 8	at Anderson*	Anderson, IN	W 43–15		
*Non-conference game
