= List of NAIA conferences =

The following is a list of National Association of Intercollegiate Athletics (NAIA) conferences as of the 2026–27 school year. The NAIA has 20 member conferences, including nine that sponsor football. Non-football member institutions that are not a part of any of these conferences play in the Continental Athletic Conference (CAC), formerly the Association of Independent Institutions. There are two NAIA independent football schools. Unless otherwise noted, changes in conference membership occur on July 1 of the given year.

== Current conferences ==
=== Football ===
Conference	Nickname	Founded	Members	Sports	Headquarters	Map
Appalachian Athletic Conference	AAC	1985	14 (Note: 14 members; 7 football members.: 15 members and 9 football members in 2027 with addition of Carolina as non-football full member and addition of Andrew and Faulkner as football-only affiliates.)	24	Asheville, North Carolina	
Frontier Conference	Frontier	1952	12 (Note: 12 full members with Bellevue, Bismarck State, and Providence as non-football members; 14 football members with Arizona Christian, College of Idaho, Eastern Oregon, Simpson, and Southern Oregon as football affiliates.: 15 football members in 2027 with full member Bismarck State adding football.)	16	Billings, Montana	
Great Plains Athletic Conference	GPAC	1969	12 (Note: 12 members; 11 football members.)	19	Sioux City, Iowa	
Heart of America Athletic Conference	HAAC	1971	16 (Note: 16 members; 15 football members with Park as a non-football member.)	23	Overland Park, Kansas	
NAIA Independents			2 (Note: 0 members in 2027 with loss of Andrew and Faulkner.)	1		
Kansas Collegiate Athletic Conference	KCAC	1928	14 (Note: 14 members; 12 football members.)	21	Wichita, Kansas	
Mid-South Conference	MSC	1995	7 (Note: 7 members; 6 football members.: 8 members in 2027 with addition of Christian Brothers as non-football member.)	21	Bowling Green, Kentucky	
Mid-States Football Association	MSFA	1993	12 (Note: 14 members in 2027 with addition of Calumet (CCSJ) and Midway.)	1 (Note: Football-only conference.)	Findlay, Ohio	
Sooner Athletic Conference	SAC	1978	12 (Note: 12 members; 9 football members with Central Christian, John Brown, Mid-America Christian, North Texas at Dallas, Oklahoma City, College of the Ozarks, USAO, and Southwestern Christian as non-football members, and with Arkansas Baptist, Louisiana Christian, Ottawa (AZ), and Texas College as football affiliates.)	15	Oklahoma City, Oklahoma	
Sun Conference	The Sun	1990	10 (Note: 10 members; 8 football members with Thomas as a football-only affiliate.: 11 members possibly in 2027 with addition of Florida Poly.)	17	Daytona Beach, Florida	

=== Non-football ===
Conference	Nickname	Founded	Members	Sports	Headquarters	Map
American Midwest Conference	AMC	1998	10 (Note: 10 members in 2027 with merger of UHSP with Washington University in St. Louis and addition of Champion Christian.)	17	St. Louis, Missouri	
California Pacific Conference	CalPac	1996	5 (Note: 4 members in 2027 with loss of Simpson.)	10	Oakland, California	
Cascade Collegiate Conference	CCC	1988	11 (Note: 12 members in 2027 with addition of Simpson.)	13	Clackamas, Oregon	
Chicagoland Collegiate Athletic Conference	CCAC	1949	11	16	Milwaukee, Wisconsin	
Continental Athletic Conference (Independents)	CAC	2008	15 (Note: 11 members in 2027 with loss of Carolina, Champion Christian, Georgia Southern–East Georgia, and U.S. Sports.)	21		
Crossroads League	CL	1959	10 (Note: 11 members in 2027 with addition of Manchester (IN).)	15	Hartford City, Indiana	
Great Southwest Athletic Conference	GSAC	1986	11 (Note: 12 members in 2027 with addition of Yavapai.)	13	Irvine, California	
HBCU Athletic Conference	HBCUAC	1981	16	16	New Orleans, Louisiana	
Red River Athletic Conference	RRAC	1998	10	15	Dallas, Texas	
River States Conference	RSC	1916	10 (Note: 11 members in 2027 with addition of Salem (WV).)	18	Middletown, Ohio	
Southern States Athletic Conference	SSAC	1999	15 (Note: 16 members in 2027 with addition of Georgia Southern–East Georgia and U.S. Sports and loss of Loyola New Orleans.)	15	Atlanta, Georgia	
Wolverine–Hoosier Athletic Conference	WHAC	1992	10	21	Livonia, Michigan	

== Defunct conferences ==
=== Football ===
- Arkansas Intercollegiate Conference (1928–1995)
- Central States Intercollegiate Conference (1976–1989)
- Dakota Athletic Conference (2000–2012)
- Eastern Intercollegiate Athletic Conference (1983–2005)
- Evergreen Conference (1948–1984)
- Great Plains Athletic Conference (1972–1976)
- Hoosier–Buckeye Conference (1948–1985)
- Missouri College Athletic Union (1924–1970)
- Nebraska College Conference (1916–1976)
- North Dakota College Athletic Conference (Note: Both the NDCAC and the SDIC merged to form the Dakota Athletic Conference.) (1931–2000)
- North Star Athletic Association (2013–2025)
- Oklahoma Collegiate Athletic Conference (1929–1973), formerly the Oklahoma Collegiate Conference
- Oklahoma Intercollegiate Conference (1974–1997)
- Pacific Northwest Athletic Conference (1984–1998)
- South Dakota Intercollegiate Conference (1917–2000)
- South East Atlantic Conference (2004–2008), football only, members became NAIA football independents
- Southern States Conference (1938–1997), formerly the Alabama Intercollegiate Conference and the Alabama Collegiate Conference
- Texas Intercollegiate Athletic Association (1976–1996), also an NCAA Division III conference
- Tri-State Conference (1960–1981)
- Volunteer State Athletic Conference (1940s–early 1980s)
- West Virginia Intercollegiate Athletic Conference (1924–2013), transferred to the NCAA in 1995 after a two-year dual membership. Most of the final WVIAC members are now in the NCAA Division II Mountain East Conference.

=== Non-football ===
- American Mideast Conference (1949–2012)
- Georgia Intercollegiate Athletic Conference (1971–1999)
- Midlands Collegiate Athletic Conference (1994–2015)
- Midwest Collegiate Conference (1988–2015)
- Northeastern Intercollegiate Athletics Conference (2016–2019) (Note: Also formerly a United States Collegiate Athletic Association (USCAA) athletic conference.)
- Sunrise Athletic Conference (2002–2011)
- TranSouth Athletic Conference (1996–2013)

== Former conferences ==
All transferred to the NCAA.

=== Football ===
- Great Lakes Intercollegiate Athletic Conference (Note: Currently an NCAA Division II athletic conference.) (1973–1988)
- Lone Star Conference (1931–1982)
- Minnesota Intercollegiate Athletic Conference (Note: Currently an NCAA Division III athletic conference.) (1920–1982)
- Northern Sun Intercollegiate Conference (1932–1995), known as Northern Intercollegiate Conference until 1992
- Northwest Conference (1926–1996), Pacific Northwest Conference before 1984 and Northwest Conference of Independent Colleges until 1996
- Pennsylvania State Athletic Conference (1951–1980), State Teachers Conference of Pennsylvania until 1956 and Pennsylvania State Teachers College Conference before 1964
- Rocky Mountain Athletic Conference (1909–1992), Colorado Faculty Athletic Conference until 1910 and Rocky Mountain Faculty Athletic Conference until 1967
- Upper Midwest Athletic Conference (1972–2008), Twin Rivers Conference until 1983

=== Non-football ===
- Central Atlantic Collegiate Conference (1961–2002)
- Conference Carolinas (1930–1995), known as the North State Intercollegiate Athletic Conference until 1961, later as the Carolinas Intercollegiate Athletic Conference until 1995 (which held dual membership with the NCAA for two years starting in 1993), became the Carolinas–Virginia Athletic Conference until 2007
- Dixie Conference (1963–1973), became the USA South Athletic Conference in 2003

== See also ==
- List of college athletic conferences in the United States
- List of NCAA conferences
- List of NAIA institutions
