= Northeastern Intercollegiate Athletics Conference =

- Association: NAIA and USCAA
- Founded: 2016
- Folded: 2019
- Commissioner: Meg Schebler (since 2017)
- Sports fielded: 13; men's: 6; women's: 7
- Division: Division II
- No. of teams: 5
- Headquarters: Delhi, New York
- Website: www.niacsports.com

The Northeastern Intercollegiate Athletics Conference was a college athletic conference that held dual affiliation with the National Association of Intercollegiate Athletics (NAIA) and the United States Collegiate Athletic Association (USCAA). Member institutions were located in Maine, Massachusetts, Pennsylvania, and Maryland in the United States.

== History ==
The NIAC's earlier ancestor was the Sunrise Athletic Conference (SAC), which was formed in 2002 when the Maine Athletic Conference and the Mayflower Conference disbanded in the spring of 2002. Both of these conferences were NAIA conferences of long standing. The conference membership held steady with nine members until Paul Smith's College and Lyndon State College left in 2010, dropping SAC membership to seven. The conference disbanded in 2011 when the College of St. Joseph, Vermont Technical College and University of Maine at Machias left the conference and the NAIA for the United States Collegiate Athletic Association (USCAA) and the Yankee Small College Conference (YSCC). The University of Maine at Fort Kent, University of Maine at Presque Isle, and SUNY-Canton then left with no regional NAIA competition to become independents in the USCAA. In addition, Maine–Presque Isle (UMPI) transitioned to being a full independent member of NCAA Division III, while SUNY Canton was accepted into the transition process to move from the NAIA to NCAA D-III. Fisher College joined the American Mideast Conference but that conference disbanded in 2012 when many of the members left for NCAA Division II.

=== Formation of the NIAC ===
The Northeastern Intercollegiate Athletics Conference was announced in 2016 with a start date set for the 2017–18 academic year. The NIAC due to the lack of conference homes for several independent members of the NAIA as well as USCAA in the New York and New England region. In October 2016 it was announced that five charter members would form the Northeastern Intercollegiate Athletics Conference.

The NIAC's charter members include College of St. Joseph, Fisher College, State University of New York at Delhi, University of Maine–Fort Kent, and Villa Maria College. St. Joseph, Maine-Fort Kent, and Villa Maria are all members of the USCAA, while Fisher College is a member of the NAIA. SUNY-Delhi held dual membership in both the NAIA and USCAA until 2017 when it left the NIAC and joined the newly formed American Collegiate Athletic Association in NCAA D-III. St. Joseph left in 2018 to stay exclusively in the USCAA.

Green Mountain College, which joined the NIAC in 2018, left the conference after the 2019 semester when the college announced its closure that year following financial difficulties.

== Member schools ==
=== Final members ===
Institution	Location	Founded	Affiliation	Enrollment	Nickname	Joined	Left	Current conference
Fisher College	Boston, Massachusetts	1903	Nonsectarian	2,560	Falcons	2016	2019	Continental (Note: Currently an NAIA athletic conference.)
Green Mountain College	Poultney, Vermont	1834	United; Methodist	N/A	Eagles	2018	2019	Closed in 2019
University of Maine–Fort Kent	Fort Kent, Maine	1878	Public	1,557	Bengals	2016	2019	USCAA Independent
Penn State Schuylkill	Schuylkill Haven, Pennsylvania	1934	Public	940	Nittany Lions	2018	2019	Penn State (PSUAC) (Note: Currently a USCAA athletic conference.)
Washington Adventist University	Takoma Park, Maryland	1904	Seventh-day; Adventist	1,493	Shock	2018	2019	Continental

=== Former members ===
Institution	Location	Founded	Affiliation	Enrollment	Nickname	Joined	Left	Current conference
College of St. Joseph	Rutland, Vermont	1956	Nonsectarian	N/A	Fighting Saints	2016	2018	Closed in 2019
State University of New York at Delhi (SUNY Delhi)	Delhi, New York	1913	Public	3,088	Broncos	2016	2017	North Atlantic (NAC) (Note: Currently an NCAA Division III athletic conference.)
Villa Maria College	Buffalo, New York	1961	Catholic (CSSF)	544	Vikings	2016	2018	USCAA Independent

== Sports ==
Conference sports
Sport	Men's	Women's
Baseball	✓	
Basketball	✓	✓
Cross Country	✓	✓
Golf	✓	✓
Soccer	✓	✓
Softball		✓
Tennis	✓	✓
Volleyball		✓
