= SEAC =

SEAC may refer to:

- SEAC (computer), a first-generation electronic computer built in 1950
- Senior Enlisted Advisor to the Chairman, an advisor to the United States Joint Chiefs of Staff
- Senior Enlisted Advisor to the Chiefs of Staff Committee, the senior other ranks advisor of to the British Chiefs of Staff Committee
- SESAR European Airports Consortium, a participant in the reform of the fragmented European air traffic management system
- The Society for Electroanalytical Chemistry
- Society for Ethics Across the Curriculum
- South East Asia Command, a World War II Allied military command
- South East Atlantic Conference
- Southeastern Athletic Conference, an intercollegiate athletic conference of historically black colleges and universities in the United States
- Student Environmental Action Coalition, a coalition of environmental groups in the United States and Canada
- Radio SEAC, see Sri Lanka Broadcasting Corporation
- South Eastern Agricultural College, later Wye College
