= Peter E. Perley =

American politician

Member of the Vermont House of Representatives from the Franklin-4 district
- In office 2009–2013

Personal details
- Born: August 15, 1944 St. Albans, Vermont, U.S.
- Died: May 31, 2023 (aged 78)
- Party: Republican
- Education: Vermont Technical College

Peter E. Perley (August 15, 1944 – May 31, 2023) was an American politician. He served as a Republican member for the Franklin-4 district of the Vermont House of Representatives.

== Life and career ==
Perley was born in St. Albans, Vermont. He attended Vermont Technical College.

In 2008, Perley defeated Cindy Weed and Dennis A. Williams in the general election for the Franklin-4 district of the Vermont House of Representatives, winning 42 percent of the votes.

Perley died on May 31, 2023, at the age of 78.
