= Vic Rowen =

American sports coach (1919–2013)

Biographical details
- Born: July 24, 1919; Brooklyn, New York, U.S.
- Died: January 14, 2013 (aged 93); Chico, California, U.S.

Playing career

Football
- 1940s: Long Island
- Position: Tight end

Coaching career (HC unless noted)

Football
- 1946–1948: Thomas Jefferson HS (NY)
- 1951–1953: Defiance
- 1954–1960: San Francisco State (assistant)
- 1961–1989: San Francisco State

Basketball
- 1951–1954: Defiance
- 1957–1958: San Francisco State

Baseball
- 1952–1954: Defiance

Head coaching record
- Overall: 131–174–10 (college football); 54–34 (college basketball); 15–21 (college baseball)
- Bowls: 0–1

Accomplishments and honors

Championships
- Football; 1 Mid-Ohio (1953); 5 Far Western (1961–1963, 1965, 1967)

Victor Rowen (July 24, 1919 – January 14, 2013) was an American football, basketball, and baseball coach. He served as the head football coach at Defiance College from 1951 to 1953 and at San Francisco State University from 1961 to 1989, compiling a career college football record of 132–173–10. His tenure of 28 years as head coach San Francisco State spanned over half of the length of time college football was played at the school. Rowen was also the head basketball coach at Defiance from 1951 to 1954 at and San Francisco State for a season in 1957–58, tallying a career college basketball mark of 54–34.

== Early years ==
Born Brooklyn, New York, Rowen played college football at Long Island University, and later went on to earn a doctorate in physical education from Columbia University. Rowen got his start as a college coach at Ohio's Defiance College in 1951. He joined San Francisco State as an assistant coach in 1954 under Joe Verducci, until becoming head coach in 1961.

== San Francisco State ==
In Rowen's first years with the program, San Francisco State was a west-coast small college football powerhouse, winning eight Far Western Conference titles before 1967. This early success lead his team to attract a great deal of football talent to the university and San Francisco State was well known for its football during this time. All of that changed during the student strike of 1968, which crippled football at SFSU.

San Francisco State did not have a winning season between 1973 and when the program was cancelled in 1995. While noted for producing outstanding players and coaches who would go on to win with other programs, San Francisco State football under Rowen's later years was not as successful as other Division II college football teams.

Rowen was also the president of the American Football Coaches Association in 1986.

== Family ==
Rowen's son, Keith Rowen, coached in the National Football League (NFL) with various teams for over 25 years. Rowan's daughter Elise Rowan became a nurse and is now pursuing being an attorney.

== Death ==
Rowen died January 14, 2013, aged 93.

== Head coaching record ==
=== College football ===
Year	Team	Overall	Conference	Standing	Bowl/playoffs
Defiance Yellow Jackets (Mid-Ohio League) (1951–1953)
1951	Defiance	0–6	0–5	6th	
1952	Defiance	4–4	2–3	4th	
1953	Defiance	8–0	4–0	1st	
Defiance:		12–10	6–8		
San Francisco State Gators (Far Western Conference / Northern California Athletic Conference) (1961–1989)
1961	San Francisco State	8–2	4–1	T–1st	
1962	San Francisco State	6–2–1	3–1–1	1st	
1963	San Francisco State	6–2–1	3–1–1	T–1st	
1964	San Francisco State	6–3–1	3–1–1	3rd	
1965	San Francisco State	8–2	5–0	1st	
1966	San Francisco State	7–3	5–1	2nd	
1967	San Francisco State	9–2	6–0	1st	L Camellia
1968	San Francisco State	5–5	3–3	T–3rd	
1969	San Francisco State	3–7	1–4	5th	
1970	San Francisco State	0–9–1	0–4	5th	
1971	San Francisco State	5–6	2–4	6th	
1972	San Francisco State	3–8	1–4	T–5th	
1973	San Francisco State	7–2–1	3–2	T–3rd	
1974	San Francisco State	5–6	2–3	T–2nd	
1975	San Francisco State	4–4–1	2–3	T–3rd	
1976	San Francisco State	4–7	2–3	T–3rd	
1977	San Francisco State	5–5	2–3	4th	
1978	San Francisco State	1–9	0–5	6th	
1979	San Francisco State	3–7	1–4	T–5th	
1980	San Francisco State	3–6–1	1–4	T–5th	
1981	San Francisco State	3–7	0–5	6th	
1982	San Francisco State	4–6	2–3	4th	
1983	San Francisco State	2–8	1–5	6th	
1984	San Francisco State	2–7–1	2–3–1	T–4th	
1985	San Francisco State	3–6–1	2–3	4th	
1986	San Francisco State	2–9	1–4	5th	
1987	San Francisco State	1–8–1	0–4–1	6th	
1988	San Francisco State	1–9	1–4	T–5th	
1989	San Francisco State	3–7	0–5	6th	
San Francisco State:		119–164–10	58–87–5		
Total:		131–174–10			
National championship Conference title Conference division title or championship game berth
