= 1969 Chico State Wildcats football team =

American college football season

1969 Chico State Wildcats football
- Conference: Far Western Conference
- Record: 8–2 (3–2 FWC)
- Head coach: Pete Riehlman (2nd season)
- Home stadium: College Field

1969 Far Western Conference football standings
	Conf.					Overall
Team	W		L		T	W		L		T
No. 15 UPI Cal State Hayward $	5	–	0	–	0	9	–	1	–	0
No. 12 AP Sacramento State	4	–	1	–	0	8	–	2	–	0
Chico State	3	–	2	–	0	8	–	2	–	0
Humboldt State	2	–	3	–	0	6	–	4	–	0
San Francisco State	1	–	4	–	0	3	–	7	–	0
UC Davis	0	–	5	–	0	3	–	7	–	0
$ – Conference champion; Rankings from small college polls

The 1969 Chico State Wildcats football team represented Chico State College—now known as California State University, Chico—as a member of the Far Western Conference (FWC) during the 1969 NCAA College Division football season. Led by second-year head coach Pete Riehlman, Chico State compiled an overall record of 8–2 with a mark of 3–2 in conference play, placing third in the FWC. The team outscored its opponents 271 to 121 for the season. The Wildcats played home games at College Field in Chico, California.

== Schedule ==
Date	Opponent	Site	Result	Attendance	Source
September 13	at Simon Fraser*	Thunderbird Stadium; University Endowment Lands, BC	W 21–0	3,600	
September 20	at Oregon Tech*	Klamath Falls, OR	W 34–8	1,500	
September 27	Southern Oregon*	College Field; Chico, CA	W 27–15	6,500	
October 4	at Nevada*	Mackay Stadium; Reno, NV	W 42–7	3,500–5,500	
October 11	San Francisco*	College Field; Chico, CA	W 38–7	7,000	
October 18	at Cal State Hayward	Pioneer Stadium; Hayward, CA	L 20–26	4,000–5,000	
October 25	No. 6 Sacramento State	College Field; Chico, CA	L 7–24	9,800	
November 1	Humboldt State	College Field; Chico, CA	W 20–10	7,500	
November 8	at UC Davis	Toomey Field; Davis, CA	W 20–10	5,000	
November 15	San Francisco State	College Field; Chico, CA	W 42–14	6,500–7,000	
*Non-conference game; Rankings from AP Poll released prior to the game

== Team players in the NFL ==
No Chico State players were selected in the 1970 NFL draft.

The following finished their Chico State career in 1969, were not drafted, but played in the NFL.

Player	Position	First NFL team
Doug Dressler	Running back	1970 Cincinnati Bengals
