= 1969 Humboldt State Lumberjacks football team =

American college football season

1969 Humboldt State Lumberjacks football
- Conference: Far Western Conference
- Record: 6–4 (2–3 FWC)
- Head coach: Bud Van Deren (4th season)
- Home stadium: Redwood Bowl

1969 Far Western Conference football standings
	Conf.					Overall
Team	W		L		T	W		L		T
No. 15 UPI Cal State Hayward $	5	–	0	–	0	9	–	1	–	0
No. 12 AP Sacramento State	4	–	1	–	0	8	–	2	–	0
Chico State	3	–	2	–	0	8	–	2	–	0
Humboldt State	2	–	3	–	0	6	–	4	–	0
San Francisco State	1	–	4	–	0	3	–	7	–	0
UC Davis	0	–	5	–	0	3	–	7	–	0
$ – Conference champion; Rankings from small college polls

The 1969 Humboldt State Lumberjacks football team represented Humboldt State College—now known as California State Polytechnic University, Humboldt—as a member of the Far Western Conference (FWC) during the 1969 NCAA College Division football season. Led by fourth-year head coach Bud Van Deren, the Lumberjacks compiled an overall record of 6–4 with a mark of 2–3 in conference play, placing fourth in the FWC. The team outscored its opponents 267 to 158 for the season. Humboldt State played home games at the Redwood Bowl in Arcata, California.

== Schedule ==
Date	Opponent	Rank	Site	Result	Attendance	Source
September 12	Humboldt State alumni*		Redwood Bowl; Arcata, CA	L 6–42		
September 20	at Southern Oregon*		Fuller Field; Ashland, OR	W 33–7	4,000	
September 27	Oregon Tech*	No. 7 UPI	Redwood Bowl; Arcata, CA	W 71–20	6,000	
October 4	San Francisco*	No. 3 UPI	Redwood Bowl; Arcata, CA	W 47–7	6,500	
October 11	UC Davis	No. 16 AP / 3 UPI	Redwood Bowl; Arcata, CA	W 6–0	7,000	
October 18	at San Francisco State	No. 4 UPI	Cox Stadium; San Francisco, CA	W 30–14	1,200–1,500	
October 25	Nevada*	No. 19 AP / 5 UPI	Redwood Bowl; Arcata, CA	W 34–0	8,000–10,000	
November 1	at Chico State	No. 10 AP / 6 UPI	College Field; Chico, CA	L 10–20	7,500	
November 8	at Cal State Hayward	No. 17 AP / 18 UPI	Pioneer Stadium; Hayward, CA	L 13–28	8,000–9,000	
November 15	No. 12 AP Sacramento State		Redwood Bowl; Arcata, CA	L 17–20	7,000	
*Non-conference game; Rankings from AP/UPI Poll released prior to the game

== Team players in the NFL ==
The following Humboldt State players were selected in the 1970 NFL draft.

Player	Position	Round	Overall	NFL team
Dan Hook	Linebacker	11	276	Green Bay Packers
