= Kirk Mee =

American football and baseball player and coach (born 1939)

Biographical details
- Born: March 5, 1939; Hamilton, Ohio, U.S.

Playing career

Football
- 1957–1960: Wilmington (OH)

Baseball
- c. 1960: Wilmington (OH)

Coaching career (HC unless noted)

Football
- 1961–1962: Ohio (GA)
- 1963: Defiance (assistant)
- 1964–1966: Defiance
- 1967–1969: Wisconsin (assistant)
- 1972–1973: Earlham
- 1974–1977: Washington Redskins (LB)
- 1978–1980: Washington Redskins (WR/TE)

Baseball
- 1964–1966: Defiance
- 1973: Earlham

Administrative career (AD unless noted)
- 1970: Washington Redskins (scout)
- 1981–2005: Washington Redskins (dir. of player personnel)

Head coaching record
- Overall: 21–22–1 (football); 39–29 (baseball)

Accomplishments and honors

Championships
- Football; 1 Mid-Ohio (1966)

Kirk Mee (born March 5, 1939) is an American former football and baseball player and coach. He was the head football coach at Defiance College in Defiance, Ohio from 1964 to 1966 and Earlham College in Richmond, Indiana from 1972 to 1973, compiling a career college football coaching record of 21–22–1.

Mee served in several coaching roles with the Washington Redskins of the National Football League (NFL) and after serving as an assistant football coach at the University of Wisconsin–Madison from 1967 to 1969.

Before his coaching career, Mee competed on the football, baseball, and track and field teams at Wilmington College in Ohio.

== Head coaching record ==
=== Football ===
Year	Team	Overall	Conference	Standing	Bowl/playoffs
Defiance Yellow Jackets (Mid-Ohio Conference) (1964–1966)
1964	Defiance	4–4	1–2	3rd	
1965	Defiance	3–4	1–2	3rd	
1966	Defiance	8–0	2–0	1st	
Defiance:		15–8–1	4–4		
Earlham Quakers (Hoosier–Buckeye Conference) (1972–1973)
1972	Earlham	2–8	1–6	9th	
1973	Earlham	4–6	3–4	6th	
Earlham:		6–14	4–10		
Total:		21–22–1			
