= 1969 UC Davis Aggies football team =

American college football season

1969 UC Davis Aggies football
- Conference: Far Western Conference
- Record: 3–7 (0–5 FWC)
- Head coach: Herb Schmalenberger (7th season)
- Captains: Jerry DeLoach; John Kohmoos
- Home stadium: Toomey Field

1969 Far Western Conference football standings
	Conf.					Overall
Team	W		L		T	W		L		T
No. 15 UPI Cal State Hayward $	5	–	0	–	0	9	–	1	–	0
No. 12 AP Sacramento State	4	–	1	–	0	8	–	2	–	0
Chico State	3	–	2	–	0	8	–	2	–	0
Humboldt State	2	–	3	–	0	6	–	4	–	0
San Francisco State	1	–	4	–	0	3	–	7	–	0
UC Davis	0	–	5	–	0	3	–	7	–	0
$ – Conference champion; Rankings from small college polls

1969 UC Davis Aggies football team represented the University of California, Davis as a member of the Far Western Conference (FWC) during the 1969 NCAA College Division football season. Led by Herb Schmalenberger in his seventh and final season as head coach, the Aggies compiled an overall record of 3–7 with a mark of 0–5 in conference play, placing last out of six teams in the FWC. The team was outscored by its opponents 258 to 192 for the season. The Aggies played home games at Toomey Field in Davis, California.

In the seven years under Schmalenberger, the Aggies compiled an overall record of 28–38, for a winning percentage of .424. Schmalenberger was also the head coach of the swimming team for five seasons, from 1957 to 1962, and the basketball team for one season, in 1957–58, at the school.

The UC Davis sports teams were commonly called the "Cal Aggies" from 1924 until the mid-1970s.

== Schedule ==
Date	Opponent	Site	Result	Attendance	Source
September 20	Santa Clara*	Toomey Field; Davis, CA	L 10–39	5,400	
September 27	Whittier*	Toomey Field; Davis, CA	W 34–28	3,200	
October 4	No. 11 Sacramento State*	Toomey Field; Davis, CA (rivalry)	L 10–18	8,800	
October 11	at Humboldt State	Redwood Bowl; Arcata, CA	L 0–6	7,000	
October 18	Cal Poly Pomona*	Toomey Field; Davis, CA	W 45–13	3,200	
October 25	San Francisco State	Toomey Field; Davis, CA	L 16–21	5,500	
November 1	at Nevada*	Mackay Stadium; Reno, NV	L 12–30	2,000	
November 8	Chico State	Toomey Field; Davis, CA	L 10–20	5,000	
November 15	at Cal State Hayward	Pioneer Stadium; Hayward, CA	L 20–49	3,500–8,500	
November 22	at UC Riverside	Highlander Stadium; Riverside, CA	W 35–34	1,200–3,500	
*Non-conference game; Rankings from AP Poll released prior to the game

== NFL draft ==
The following UC Davis Aggies players were selected in the 1970 NFL draft.

Player	Position	Round	Overall	NFL team
Tom Williams	Defensive tackle, defensive end	2	42	San Diego Chargers
Howard Gravelle	Tight end	12	302	San Diego Chargers
Gary Deloach	Guard	12	310	Oakland Raiders
