= WVTC =

- Randolph Center, Vermont; United States
- Broadcast area: Vermont Technical College
- Frequency: 90.7 MHz
- Branding: Tech Radio

Programming
- Format: College Radio

Ownership
- Owner: Vermont State Colleges

History
- First air date: 1969
- Call sign meaning: Vermont Technical College

Technical information
- Licensing authority: FCC
- Facility ID: 69957
- Class: A
- ERP: 300 watts
- HAAT: 64.0 meters (210.0 ft)
- Transmitter coordinates: 43.9387°N 72.6047°W

Links
- Public license information: Public file; LMS
- Webcast: Listen live
- Website: wvtc.net

WVTC is the radio station of Vermont State University's Randolph campus (formerly Vermont Technical College), broadcasting on 90.7 FM and licensed to Randolph Center, Vermont. The station is located in Morey Hall. WVTC is operated and maintained by the students as a club, and is financially supported by the college's Student Council.

== History ==
WVTC began in 1963 as a small AM station on 640 kHz with a 2-watt transmitter in the Old Dorm building. It is unclear how the antenna system worked; there is speculation that it may have been a carrier current system. The 1965 VTC yearbook distinguished between the Radio Club and the Radio Station WVTC-AM 640. In 1966, a new dorm building, Morey Hall, was built on the Randolph Center campus, including provisions for a campus radio station. In September 1968, the college applied for and began construction of a new licensed educational FM station. On June 23, 1969, the radio station received a license from the FCC to broadcast as WVTC-FM at 90.7 MHz and 10 watts.

The station prospered during the 1970s, with the involvement of Howard Ginsberg, who later founded WXXX, a successful commercial Top 40 station in Burlington, Vermont. In April 1980, the station was granted an increase in power from 10 watts to 300 watts effective radiated power.

In the 1990s, WVTC migrated to CD technology in addition to the existing records and tapes. From April to November 1995, the station was off the air due to a failed Emergency Broadcast System (EBS) receiver and other potential violations. Many upgrades were performed the in 1996, including new studio and broadcasting equipment. Remote broadcasts were done from around campus and from basketball games. MP3s were introduced as an on-air medium the same year. The first MP3 played on the station was "Stupid Girl" by Garbage. A new FM transmitter and feedline were installed and a new 30' tower with antenna was erected on December 26, 1996.

Station staff created an improved FM radio card driver (AZTEC) for Linux and their code was added to the Linux Kernel. The station began internet webcasting in February 1997, streaming both music and webcam images. The first on-line radio streaming station in Northern New England, WVTC sent a copy of on-air audio over MP3 format at 16 kbit/s using custom written linux software on a Pentium 60 computer.

In 1997, WVTC experimented with station automation, using multi-CD changers, controlled via serial connection; it became MP3-based before the system was complete. In 1998 the "WebDJ" automation system went live, allowing users to place requests online. Secondary Carrier Authorization (SCA) technology was explored, with data being sent over the air about weather and news events at 1200 baud. WVTC began broadcast operation 24/7 for the first time, and ranked in the broadcast ratings for Central Vermont. Over 80 hours of shows were performed by over 70 members of the WVTC club each week and listeners of the online stream were logged on all seven continents. Technological innovations of 1998 included an upgrade to a 32 kbit/s stream using a computer club purchased Linux server with two processors called "Halftime", as well as the creation of a remote control interface for the Winamp application.

In March 2000, DJ "Disco" Vince Giffin set a world record for the longest time for a single DJ on the air, at 73 hours. In 2001, MP3 music replaced CDs as the station's primary audio storage format. In 2006, the station's survival was jeopardised by low membership, and went off the air due to transmitter problems during the summer, returning after repairs in the fall. The following Spring a small group of students banded together to prevent the school administration from shutting down WVTC. Some hardware and software upgrades were performed in the spring and a couple of regular shows were broadcast.

In October 2007, WVTC was forced to shut down when their FCC license failed to be renewed by the college. Shortly afterwards, the college was approached by Vermont Public Radio with proposals to lease the station, which was not accepted. The station resumed transmission in October 2008. However, WVTC went offline again before the end of the year after repeated power failures damaged their equipment. The equipment was eventually repaired, and transmission resumed in Fall 2009.

In the spring of 2011, the station filed a Consent Decree with the FCC; it returned to being a fully licensed station after a Final Consent Decree Inspection in fall 2013. Also in fall 2015, the internet stream was upgraded to 320kpbs.

In 2023, the station underwent minor renovations. Improvements include updates to the automation system, which was rewritten in Python.

== Trivia ==
The station, operating at 90.7 MHz and 300 watts, emits 4.991789 × 10^{27} photons per second.

== Gallery ==
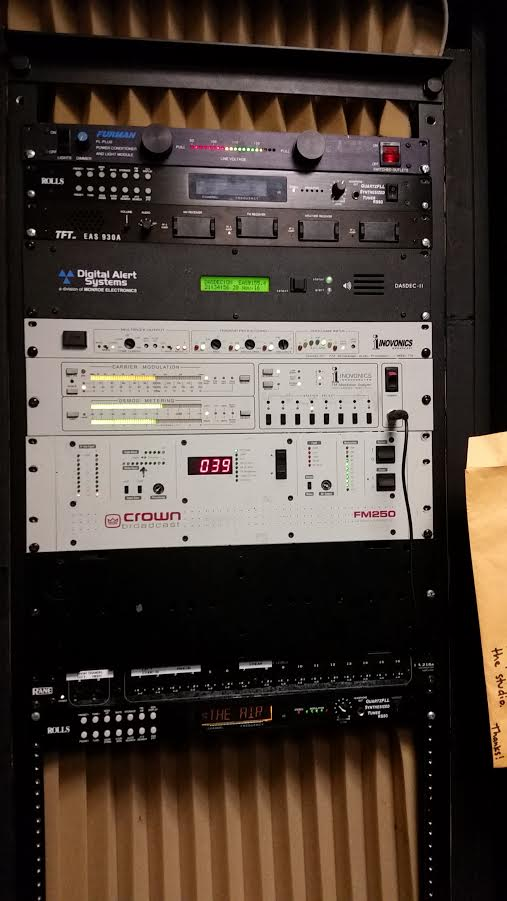
Transmitting equipment in 2016.

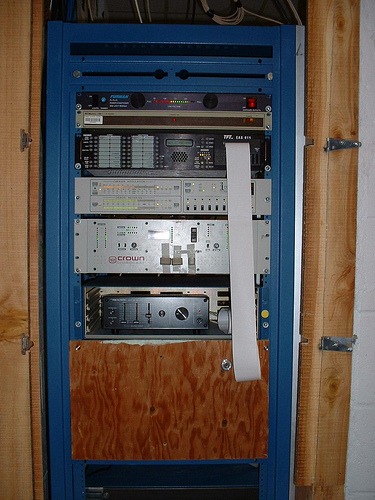
Pre-2012 equipment in the station.

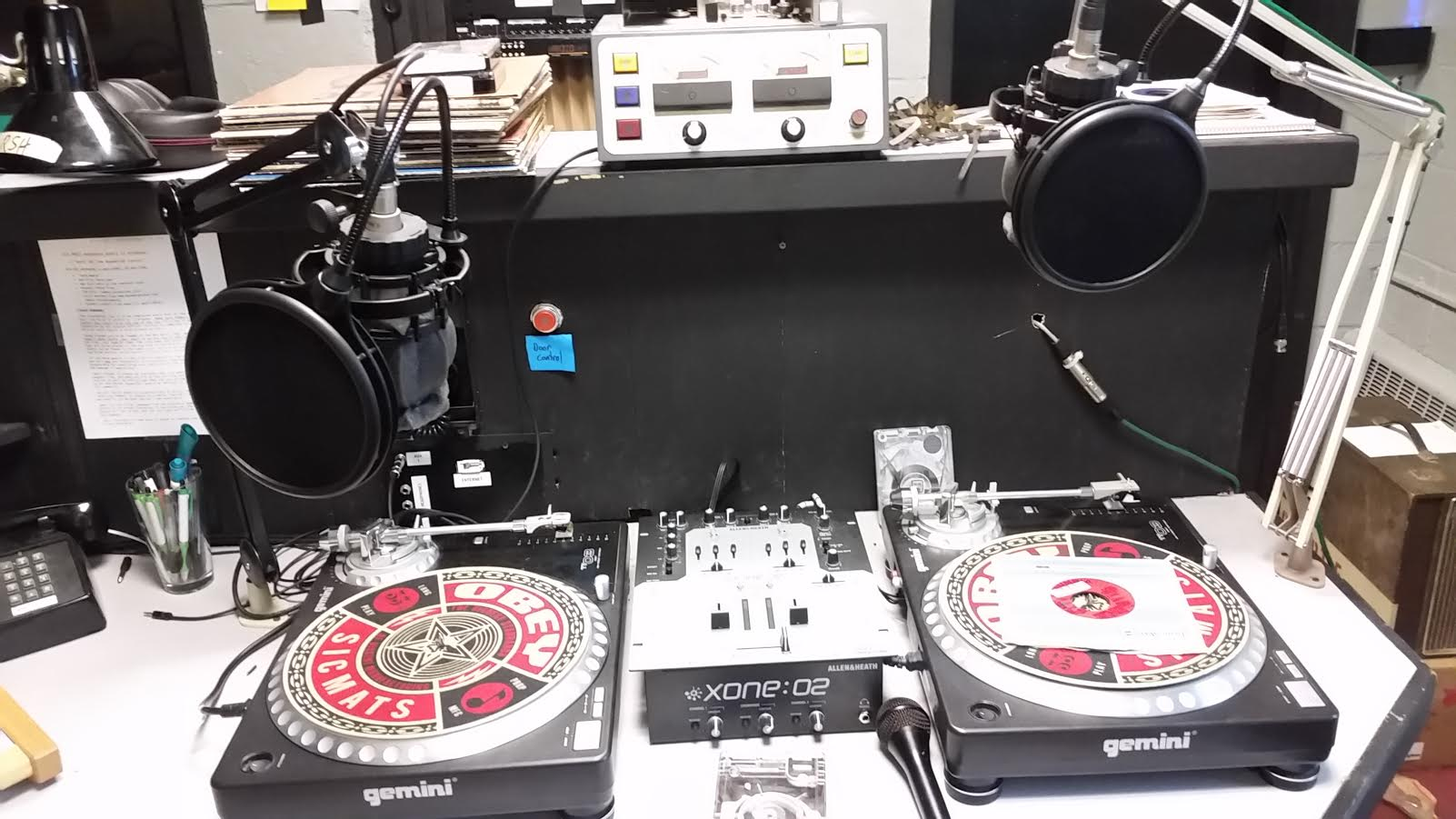
The set up for live shows

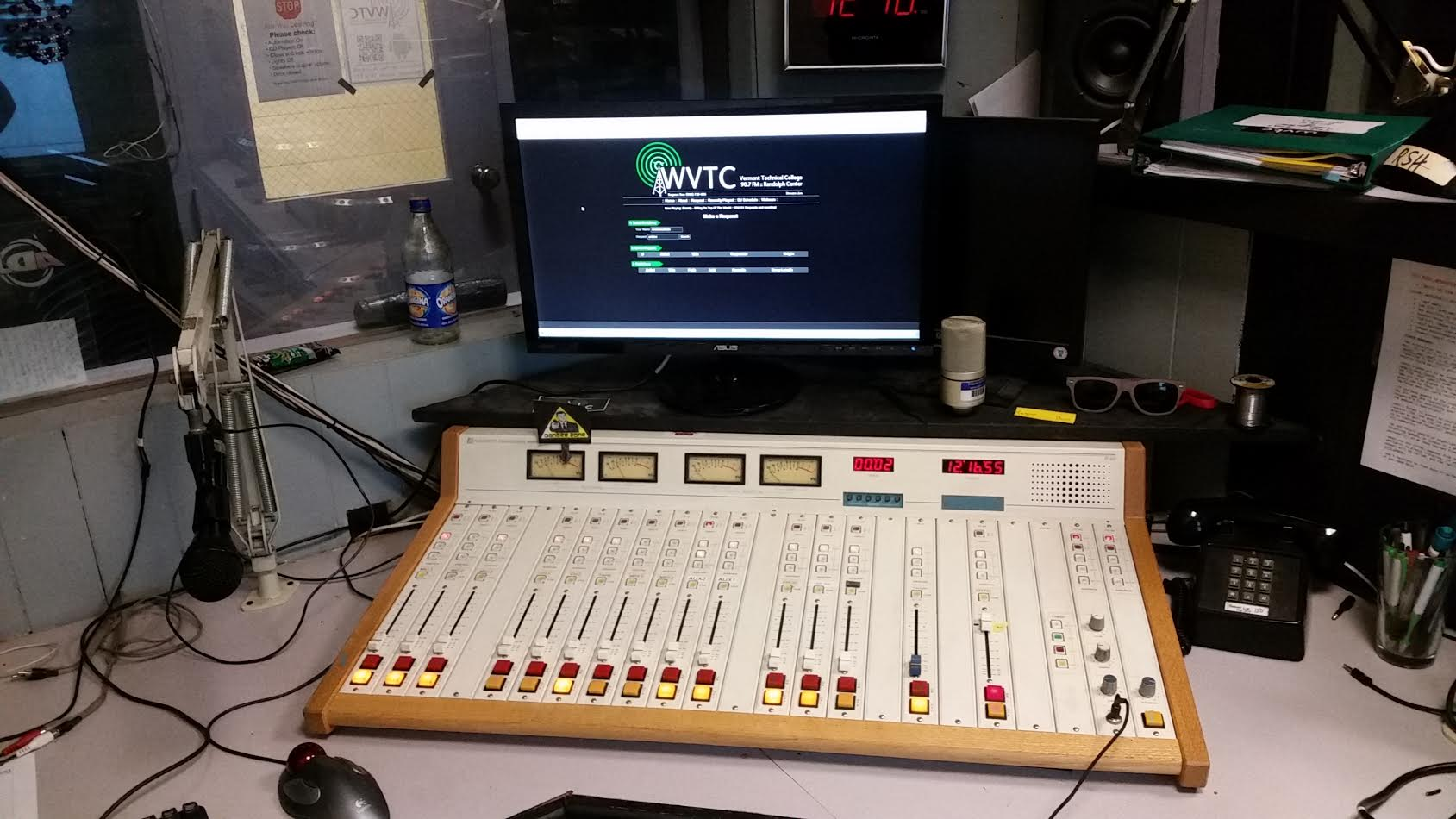
WVTC's main mixer station.

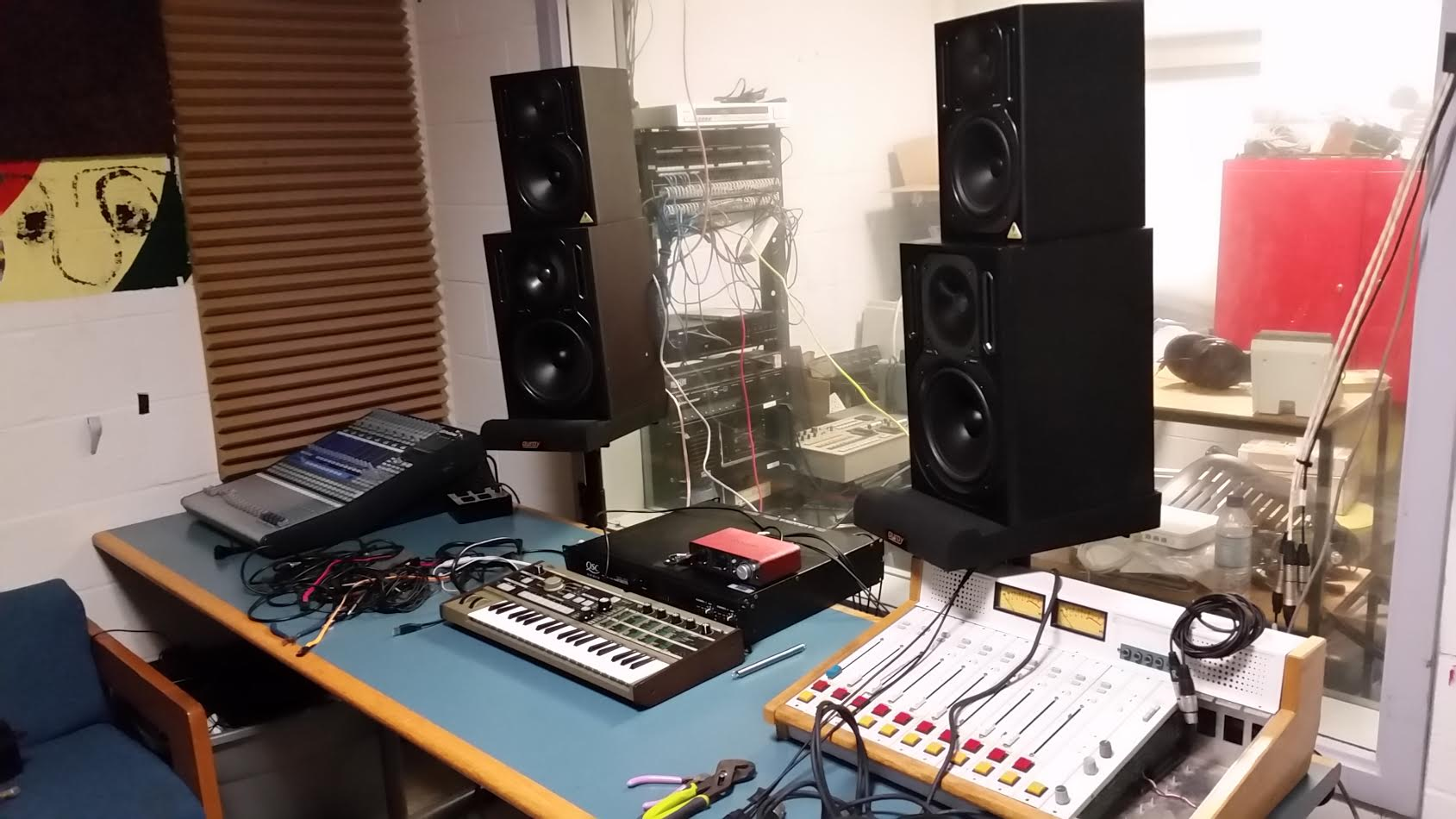
A photo of the recording & production room in 2016.
