= Thomas McGovern =

Thomas McGovern may refer to:

- Thomas McGovern (bishop) (1832–1898), second Roman Catholic Bishop of Harrisburg, Pennsylvania
- Thomas McGovern (politician) (1851–1904), Irish nationalist politician, Member of Parliament for West Cavan, 1900–1904
- Thomas Michael McGovern (born 1944), president of Fisher College
