= 1953 Defiance Yellow Jackets football team =

American college football season

1953 Defiance Yellow Jackets football

MOL champion
- Conference: Mid-Ohio League
- Record: 8–0 (4–0 MOL)
- Head coach: Vic Rowen (3rd season)

1953 Mid-Ohio League football standings
	Conf.					Overall
Team	W		L		T	W		L		T
Defiance $	4	–	0	–	0	8	–	0	–	0
Findlay	2	–	2	–	0	3	–	4	–	0
Bluffton	2	–	2	–	0	3	–	4	–	0
Ohio Northern	1	–	3	–	0	1	–	7	–	1
Ashland	1	–	3	–	0	1	–	7	–	0
$ – Conference champion

The 1953 Defiance Yellow Jackets football team was an American football team that represented Defiance College as a member of the Mid-Ohio League (MOL) during the 1953 college football season. In their third year under head coach Vic Rowen, the Yellow Jackets compiled an 8–0 record (4–0 against conference opponents), won the MOL championship, and outscored opponents by a total of 163 to 59.

Defiance was the only unbeaten and untied football team in Ohio during the 1953 season. It was the first perfect season in Defiance football history. Additional perfect seasons followed in 1966 and 1969.

== Schedule ==
Date	Opponent	Site	Result	Attendance	Source
September 26	Ferris Institute*	Defiance, OH	W 25–0		
October 3	Adrian*	Defiance, OH	W 19–7	1,000	
October 10	at Ashland	Redwood Stadium; Ashland, OH	W 13–12		
October 17	Findlay	Defiance, OH	W 20–0		
October 24	at Ohio Northern	Ada, OH	W 28–7		
October 31	Anderson*	Defiance, OH	W 27–14		
November 7	Bluffton	Defiance, OH	W 12–6		
November 14	at Centre*	Danville, KY	W 19–13		
*Non-conference game
