= Vermont Lunar CubeSat =

CubeSat satellite

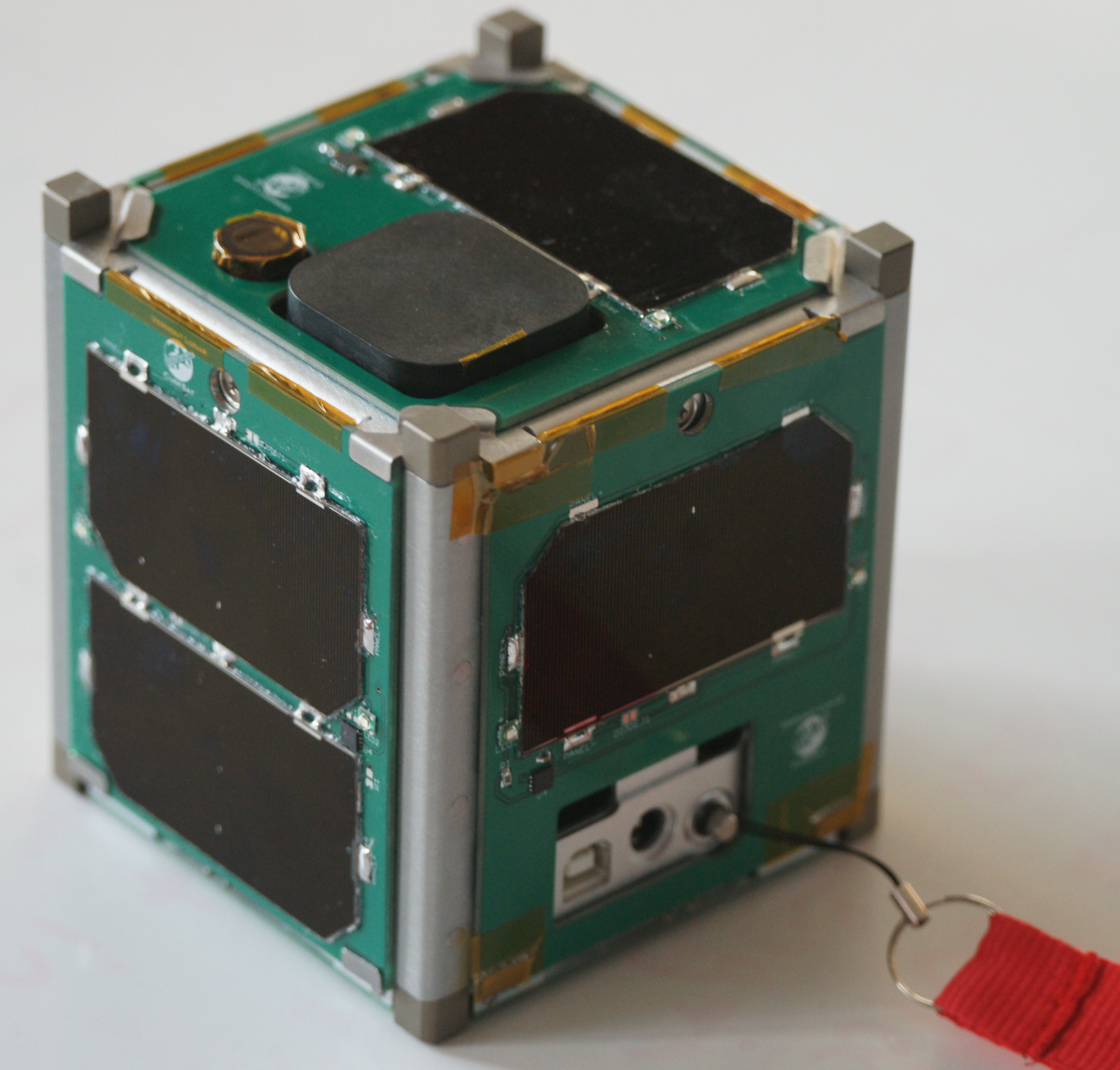
- Mission type: Technology
- Operator: Vermont Technical College
- COSPAR ID: 2013-064AD
- SATCAT no.: 39407

Spacecraft properties
- Manufacturer: Vermont Technical College
- Launch mass: 1 kilogram (2.2 lb)

Start of mission
- Launch date: November 20, 2013, 01:15 UTC
- Rocket: Minotaur I
- Launch site: MARS LP-0B

End of mission
- Disposal: Deorbited
- Decay date: November 21, 2015

Orbital parameters
- Reference system: Geocentric
- Regime: Inclined
- Perigee altitude: 438 km (272 mi)
- Apogee altitude: 450 km (280 mi)
- Inclination: 40.52 degrees
- Period: 93.47 minutes
- Epoch: July 4, 2014, 20:59:35 UTC

The Vermont Lunar CubeSat is a CubeSat satellite by Vermont Technical College and funded in part by grants from NASA and the Vermont Space Grant Consortium and in part by voluntary donations. The satellite, costing about US$50,000 to build — with NASA offering a free launch as part of the ELaNa program — served as a testing model for guidance and navigation pending future launches. The eventual goal of the project is to build a CubeSat capable of orbiting the Moon.

It was launched on November 19, 2013, from Wallops Flight Facility in Virginia as part of a payload containing two NASA, 11 university, one high school, and 14 Air Force CubeSats. Vermont Lunar is the only non-NASA/USAF CubeSat from this ELaNa IV launch that is fully working. Eight were never heard from at all. SPARK/Ada 2005 was used, and this is the first spacecraft of any kind programmed in SPARK. The control software contained about 10,000 lines of SPARK/Ada code. The Principal Investigator was Carl Brandon, the Software Supervisor was Peter Chapin, and Dan Turner served as the Principal Developer. This was the first satellite of any kind built by a college or university in New England.

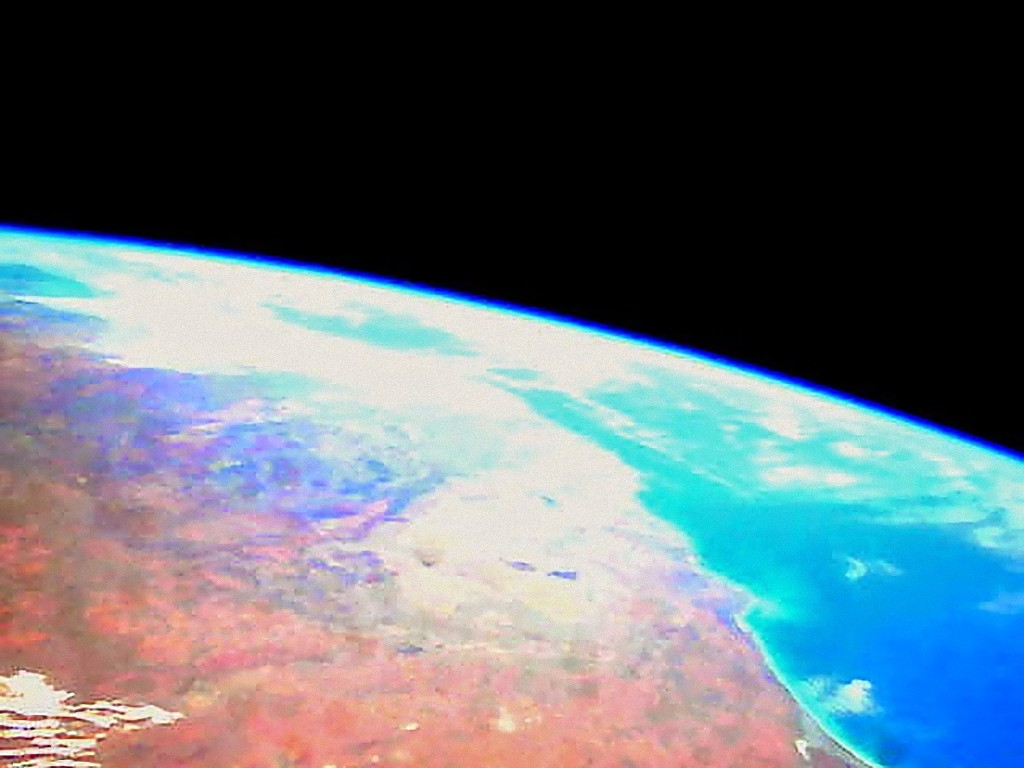
The North coast of Western Australia near Port Hedland taken by the Vermont Lunar CubeSat

== See also ==
Lunar CubeSats in development

- Lunar IceCube
- Lunar Flashlight
- Lunar Polar Hydrogen Mapper
