= 1969 Sacramento State Hornets football team =

American college football season

1969 Sacramento State Hornets football
- Conference: Far Western Conference

Ranking
- AP: No. 12 (small college)
- Record: 8–2 (4–1 FWC)
- Head coach: Ray Clemons (9th season)
- Home stadium: Hornet Stadium

1969 Far Western Conference football standings
| | Conf. | | | | | Overall |
| Team | W | | L | | T | W | | L | | T |
|---|---|---|---|---|---|---|---|---|---|---|
| No. 15 UPI Cal State Hayward $ | 5 | – | 0 | – | 0 | 9 | – | 1 | – | 0 |
| No. 12 AP Sacramento State | 4 | – | 1 | – | 0 | 8 | – | 2 | – | 0 |
| Chico State | 3 | – | 2 | – | 0 | 8 | – | 2 | – | 0 |
| Humboldt State | 2 | – | 3 | – | 0 | 6 | – | 4 | – | 0 |
| San Francisco State | 1 | – | 4 | – | 0 | 3 | – | 7 | – | 0 |
| UC Davis | 0 | – | 5 | – | 0 | 3 | – | 7 | – | 0 |
$ – Conference champion; Rankings from small college polls

The 1969 Sacramento State Hornets football team represented Sacramento State College—now known as California State University, Sacramento—as a member of the Far Western Conference (FWC) during the 1969 NCAA College Division football season. Led by ninth-year head coach Ray Clemons, Sacramento State compiled an overall record of 8–2 with a mark of 4–1 in conference play, placing second in the FWC. The team finished the season ranked No. 12 in the AP small college poll and outscored its opponents 279 to 140 for the season. The Hornets played home games at Hornet Stadium in Sacramento, California.

== Schedule ==
| Date | Opponent | Rank | Site | Result | Attendance | Source |
|---|---|---|---|---|---|---|
| September 20 | Valley State* | | Hornet Stadium; Sacramento, CA | L 24–28 | 5,100 | |
| September 27 | at Cal Poly Pomona* | No. 12 | Kellogg Field; Pomona, CA | W 28–9 | 1,500 | |
| October 4 | at UC Davis | No. 11 | Toomey Field; Davis, CA (rivalry) | W 18–10 | 8,800 | |
| October 11 | San Francisco State | No. 7 | Hornet Stadium; Sacramento, CA | W 19–6 | 2,500 | |
| October 18 | Nevada* | No. 8 | Hornet Stadium; Sacramento, CA | W 41–7 | 3,550 | |
| October 25 | at Chico State | No. 6 | College Field; Chico, CA | W 24–7 | 9,800 | |
| November 1 | Cal State Hayward | No. 6 | Hornet Stadium; Sacramento, CA | L 30–32 | 5,500–7,000 | |
| November 8 | at San Francisco* | No. 16 | Kezar Stadium; San Francisco, CA | W 26–0 | 3,500 | |
| November 15 | at Humboldt State | No. 12 | Redwood Bowl; Arcata, CA | W 20–17 | 7,000 | |
| November 22 | Puget Sound* | No. 10 | Hornet Stadium; Sacramento, CA | W 49–24 | 6,500 | |
*Non-conference game; Rankings from AP Poll released prior to the game

== Team players in the NFL ==
The following Sacramento State players were selected in the 1970 NFL draft.

| Player | Position | Round | Overall | NFL team |
| Mike Carter | Wide receiver | 15 | 380 | Green Bay Packers |
