= Larry Townsend (politician) =

American politician

Member of the Vermont House of Representatives
- In office 2008–2013

Personal details
- Born: June 10, 1947 Bethel, Vermont, U.S.
- Died: June 29, 2013 (aged 66) Randolph, Vermont, U.S.
- Party: Democratic
- Education: Vermont Technical College (AS)

Military service
- Branch/service: United States Army
- Battles/wars: Vietnam War

Lawrence E. "Larry" Townsend (June 10, 1947 – June 29, 2013) was an American politician.

== Early life and education ==
Born in Bethel, Vermont, Townsend served in the United States Army during the Vietnam War. He received an associate degree from Vermont Technical College.

== Career ==
Townsend worked for General Electric and the United States Postal Service. Townsend also served in local government in the Randolph Selectboard and Randolph High School board. Townsend served in the Vermont House of Representatives as a Democrat from 2008 until his death in 2013.

== Personal life ==
Townsend died in Randolph, Vermont, of cancer.
