= 1966 Defiance Yellow Jackets football team =

American college football season

1966 Defiance Yellow Jackets football
- Conference: Mid-Ohio Conference
- Record: 9–0 (2–0 MOC)
- Head coach: Kirk Mee (3rd season)

1966 Mid-Ohio Conference football standings
	Conf.					Overall
Team	W		L		T	W		L		T
No. 10 Defiance $	2	–	0	–	0	9	–	0	–	0
Ashland	1	–	0	–	0	5	–	3	–	2
Bluffton	1	–	2	–	0	3	–	4	–	1
Wilmington (OH)	0	–	2	–	0	1	–	7	–	0
$ – Conference champion; Rankings from NAIA poll

The 1966 Defiance Yellow Jackets football team was an American football team that represented Defiance College as a member of the Mid-Ohio Conference (MOC) during the 1966 NAIA football season. In their third year under head coach Kirk Mee, the Yellow Jackets compiled a 9–0 record (2–0 against conference opponents), won the MOC championship, and outscored opponents by a total of 218 to 41.

At the end of the season, Kirk Mee was voted coach of the year in the NAIA's District 22. Quarterback George Smart, halfback Ben Davis, and linebacker Jose Arellano were named to the all-NAIA, District 22, football team. Defiance also placed 12 players on the 1966 all-MOC football team. Other honorees included quarterback George Smart, offensive backs Ben Smith and Ron Seymour, center Tom Miller, offensive end Doug Huffman, offensive tackle Bob Smith, offensive guard Phil Haubert, middle guard Ron Kowalski, linebackers Rodger Geren and Jose Arellano, and defensive back Greg Kulwicki.

The 1966 season was one of three perfect seasons in Defiance football history, the others being in 1953 and 1969.

== Schedule ==
Date	Opponent	Site	Result	Attendance	Source
September 17	at Kenyon*	Gambier, OH	W 35–0	1,000	
September 24	Adrian*	Defiance, OH	W 20–0		
October 1	Georgetown (KY)*	Defiance, OH	W 27–6		
October 8	at Wilmington (OH)	Wilmington, OH	W 26–8		
October 15	at Grand Rapids JC*	Grand Rapids, MI	W 14–7		
October 22	at Bluffton	Bluffton, OH	W 28–7		
October 28	Salem (WV)*	Defiance, OH	W 21–7		
November 5	at Taylor*	Upland, IN	W 9–7		
November 12	Anderson (IN)*	Defiance, OH	W 38–0		
*Non-conference game
