= 1969 San Francisco State Gators football team =

American college football season

1969 San Francisco State Gators football
- Conference: Far Western Conference
- Record: 3–7 (1–4 FWC)
- Head coach: Vic Rowen (9th season)
- Home stadium: Cox Stadium

1969 Far Western Conference football standings
	Conf.					Overall
Team	W		L		T	W		L		T
No. 15 UPI Cal State Hayward $	5	–	0	–	0	9	–	1	–	0
No. 12 AP Sacramento State	4	–	1	–	0	8	–	2	–	0
Chico State	3	–	2	–	0	8	–	2	–	0
Humboldt State	2	–	3	–	0	6	–	4	–	0
San Francisco State	1	–	4	–	0	3	–	7	–	0
UC Davis	0	–	5	–	0	3	–	7	–	0
$ – Conference champion; Rankings from small college polls

The 1969 San Francisco State Gators football team represented San Francisco State College—now known as San Francisco State University—as a member of the Far Western Conference (FWC) during the 1969 NCAA College Division football season. Led by ninth-year head coach Vic Rowen, San Francisco State compiled an overall record of 3–7 with a mark of 1–4 in conference play, placing fifth in the FWC. For the season the team was outscored by its opponents 305 to 151. The Gators played home games at Cox Stadium in San Francisco.

== Schedule ==
Date	Opponent	Site	Result	Attendance	Source
September 20	Cal Poly*	Cox Stadium; San Francisco, CA	L 7–71	1,500	
September 27	at Santa Clara*	Buck Shaw Stadium; Santa Clara, CA	L 15–32	8,000	
October 4	Cal State Hayward	Cox Stadium; San Francisco, CA	L 21–28	2,000–2,500	
October 11	at No. 7 Sacramento State	Hornet Stadium; Sacramento, CA	L 6–19	2,500	
October 18	Humboldt State	Cox Stadium; San Francisco, CA	L 14–30	1,200–1,500	
October 25	at UC Davis	Toomey Field; Davis, CA	W 21–16	5,500	
November 1	at Southern Oregon*	Fuller Field; Ashland, OR	W 16–0	700	
November 8	Nevada*	Cox Stadium; San Francisco, CA	W 27–26	1,000	
November 15	at Chico State	College Field; Chico, CA	L 14–42	6,500–7,000	
November 22	Long Beach State*	Cox Stadium; San Francisco, CA	L 10–41	1,000	
*Non-conference game; Rankings from AP Poll released prior to the game

== Team players in the NFL ==
The following San Francisco State players were selected in the 1970 NFL draft.

Player	Position	Round	Overall	NFL team
Paul Dunn	Running back	13	319	Cincinnati Bengals
