= 1969 Cal State Hayward Pioneers football team =

American college football season

1969 Cal State Hayward Pioneers football

FWC champion
- Conference: Far Western Conference

Ranking
- Coaches: No. 15 (UPI small college)
- Record: 9–1 (5–0 FWC)
- Head coach: Les Davis (4th season)
- Home stadium: Pioneer Stadium

1969 Far Western Conference football standings
| | Conf. | | | | | Overall |
| Team | W | | L | | T | W | | L | | T |
|---|---|---|---|---|---|---|---|---|---|---|
| No. 15 UPI Cal State Hayward $ | 5 | – | 0 | – | 0 | 9 | – | 1 | – | 0 |
| No. 12 AP Sacramento State | 4 | – | 1 | – | 0 | 8 | – | 2 | – | 0 |
| Chico State | 3 | – | 2 | – | 0 | 8 | – | 2 | – | 0 |
| Humboldt State | 2 | – | 3 | – | 0 | 6 | – | 4 | – | 0 |
| San Francisco State | 1 | – | 4 | – | 0 | 3 | – | 7 | – | 0 |
| UC Davis | 0 | – | 5 | – | 0 | 3 | – | 7 | – | 0 |
$ – Conference champion; Rankings from small college polls

The 1969 Cal State Hayward Pioneers football team represented California State College at Hayward—now known California State University, East Bay—as a member of the Far Western Conference (FWC) during the 1969 NCAA College Division football season. Led by fourth-year head coach Les Davis, Cal State Hayward compiled an overall record of 9–1 with a mark of 5–0 in conference play, winning the FWC title for the program's first conference championship. The team was outscored by its opponents 262 to 165 for the season. The Pioneers played home games at Pioneer Stadium in Hayward, California.

The 1969 team was the most successful in the 29 years of Cal State Hayward football, which competed from 1965 to 1993. They defeated two teams ranked in the top 20 of the small college rankings and finished the season ranked 15th in the UPI Small College poll. 1969 Pioneers had the most wins, nine, and fewest losses, one, of any team in program history. It was the only season in which was team was undefeated in the conference and won the conference championship outright.

== Schedule ==
| Date | Opponent | Rank | Site | Result | Attendance | Source |
|---|---|---|---|---|---|---|
| September 20 | at Whittier* | | Memorial Stadium; Whittier, CA | W 10–7 | 2,500–3,000 | |
| September 27 | Occidental* | | Pioneer Stadium; Hayward, CA | W 47–13 | 2,300–3,000 | |
| October 4 | at San Francisco State | | Cox Stadium; San Francisco, CA | W 28–21 | 2,000–2,500 | |
| October 11 | at Nevada* | | Mackay Stadium; Reno, NV | L 21–31 | 2,500–2,800 | |
| October 18 | Chico State | | Pioneer Stadium; Hayward, CA | W 26–20 | 4,000–5,000 | |
| October 25 | at San Francisco* | | Kezar Stadium; San Francisco, CA | W 61–6 | 2,500 | |
| November 1 | at No. 6 AP Sacramento State | | Hornet Stadium; Sacramento, CA | W 32–30 | 5,500–7,000 | |
| November 8 | No. 17 AP Humboldt State | | Pioneer Stadium; Hayward, CA | W 28–13 | 8,000–9,000 | |
| November 15 | UC Davis | | Pioneer Stadium; Hayward, CA | W 49–20 | 3,500–8,500 | |
| November 22 | Valley State* | No. 14 UPI | Pioneer Stadium; Hayward, CA | W 25–17 | 2,800–5,000 | |
*Non-conference game; Rankings from AP/UPI Poll released prior to the game
