= Randolph Center Historic District =

Historic district in Vermont, United States

- U.S. National Register of Historic Places
- U.S. Historic district
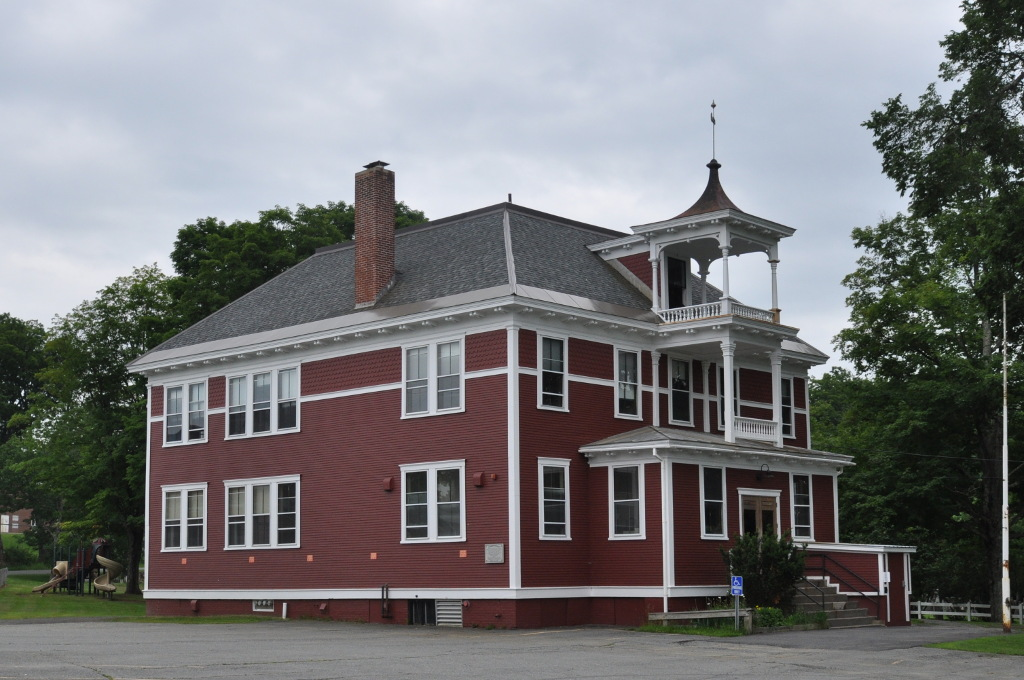
- The former district school

- Location within Vermont Location within the United States
- Location: West and Main Sts., Randolph, Vermont
- Coordinates: 43°56′18″N 72°36′46″W
- Area: 187 acres (76 ha)
- Architectural style: Greek Revival, Gothic, Cape Cod
- NRHP reference No.: 74000245
- Added to NRHP: November 21, 1974

The Randolph Center Historic District encompasses the historic early town center of Randolph, Vermont. Established in 1783, it was later eclipsed by Randolph Village, which developed around the town's main railroad depot. The village now has a distinguished array of late 18th and early 19th-century architecture and is home to an academic campus now housing Vermont State University. It was listed on the National Register of Historic Places in 1974.

== Description and history ==
The central Vermont town of Randolph was founded in 1783, with its civic center located on the crest of north–south ridge near the geographic center of the town. The ridge is traversed by Main Street (part of which is designated Vermont Route 66), and the village became an important stop on the stagecoach route between Boston, Massachusetts and Montreal. The village flourished, housing a number of industries, until the mid-19th century, when the Central Vermont Railroad was built further to the west. Since then, the economic and civic centers migrated to the area of the railroad depot, now known as Randolph Village. The center became more of a residential nexus, although it also benefited from the presence of an academic campus established in 1804. Originally housing the Randolph Academy, it is now home to the Randolph campus of the Vermont State University, formerly Vermont Technical College.

The historic district extends along Main Street, roughly from Furnace Street in the north to South Randolph Street in the south. The district is mainly residential in character with Federal and Greek Revival houses of wood and brick. Notable exceptions including the historic wood-frame dormitory (now used for other purposes) at the front of the Vermont Technical College Campus, most of which consists of modern buildings and is excluded. At the southern end of the district stand the Congregational Church (1798, restyled in 1838 into the Greek Revival and Gothic Revival), a former Methodist Church building (1881), and the 1903 community school building.

== See also ==
- National Register of Historic Places listings in Orange County, Vermont
