= Fisher College =

Private college in Boston, Massachusetts, U.S.

Coordinates: 42°21′22.08″N 71°04′26.67″W

- Former names: Winter Hill Business College (1903–1910); Fisher Business College (1910–1935); Fisher Business School (1935–1944); Fisher School (1944–1952); Fisher Junior College (1952–1957)
- Motto: Ubique Fidelis (Everywhere Faithful)
- Type: Private college
- Established: 1903
- Accreditation: New England Commission of Higher Education
- Endowment: $30.4 million
- President: Steven Rich
- Students: 1,591 (Including Accelerated and Professional Studies)
- Location: Boston, Massachusetts, U.S.
- Campus: 4 acres (1.6 ha); Urban
- Colors: Navy, White & Gray
- Nickname: Falcons
- Sporting affiliations: NAIA – Continental
- Mascot: Falcon
- Website: www.fisher.edu

Fisher College is a private college in Boston, Massachusetts, United States. It is accredited by the New England Commission of Higher Education.

== History ==
Fisher College first opened its doors in 1903, founded by Myron C. Fisher and Edmund H. Fisher under the name Winter Hill Business College in the predominantly working-class city of Somerville, Massachusetts, just two miles north of Boston. The school traces its roots to educational entrepreneurs Myron and Edmund Fisher, who believed the immigrants of that city in the early 1900s should have an opportunity to advance beyond unskilled labor jobs. Fisher College moved to its current Beacon Street location, near the Charles River, in 1939. The Beacon Street site is featured on the Boston Women's Heritage Trail. During the 1940s, the college was split into two separate entities: The Fisher School for Men and The Fisher School for Women.

In 1952, the Board of Regents of Higher Education of the Commonwealth of Massachusetts approved Fisher as a two-year college, and five years later it was given degree-granting powers. In 1970, Fisher gained accreditation from the New England Association of Schools and Colleges and operates as an independent, non-profit educational institution.

The Division of Graduate and Professional Studies was established in 1975 to serve the adult population of Eastern Massachusetts. Fisher College began offering online courses and degrees in 1998. In 1999, the College's first bachelor's degree – the Bachelor of Science in Management – was offered, and in 2015 the College's first master's – a Master of Business Administration with a focus on strategic leadership – was accredited.

=== Presidents ===
Name of President	Tenure
Myron C. Fisher	1903–1935
Sanford L. Fisher	1935–1970
Scott A. Fisher	1970–1981
Richard A. Boudreau	1981–1984
Brian Donnelly	1985–1986
Christian C. Fisher	1993–2001
Charles C. Perkins	2003–2007
Thomas Michael McGovern	2007–2017
Alan Ray	2017–2020
Steven Rich	2020–
* Gaps in terms denote interim presidencies.

== Academics ==
Fisher College offers graduate programs, including a Master of Business Administration (MBA) with a concentration in Strategic Leadership, bachelor's and associate degrees, and certifications.

== Student demographics ==
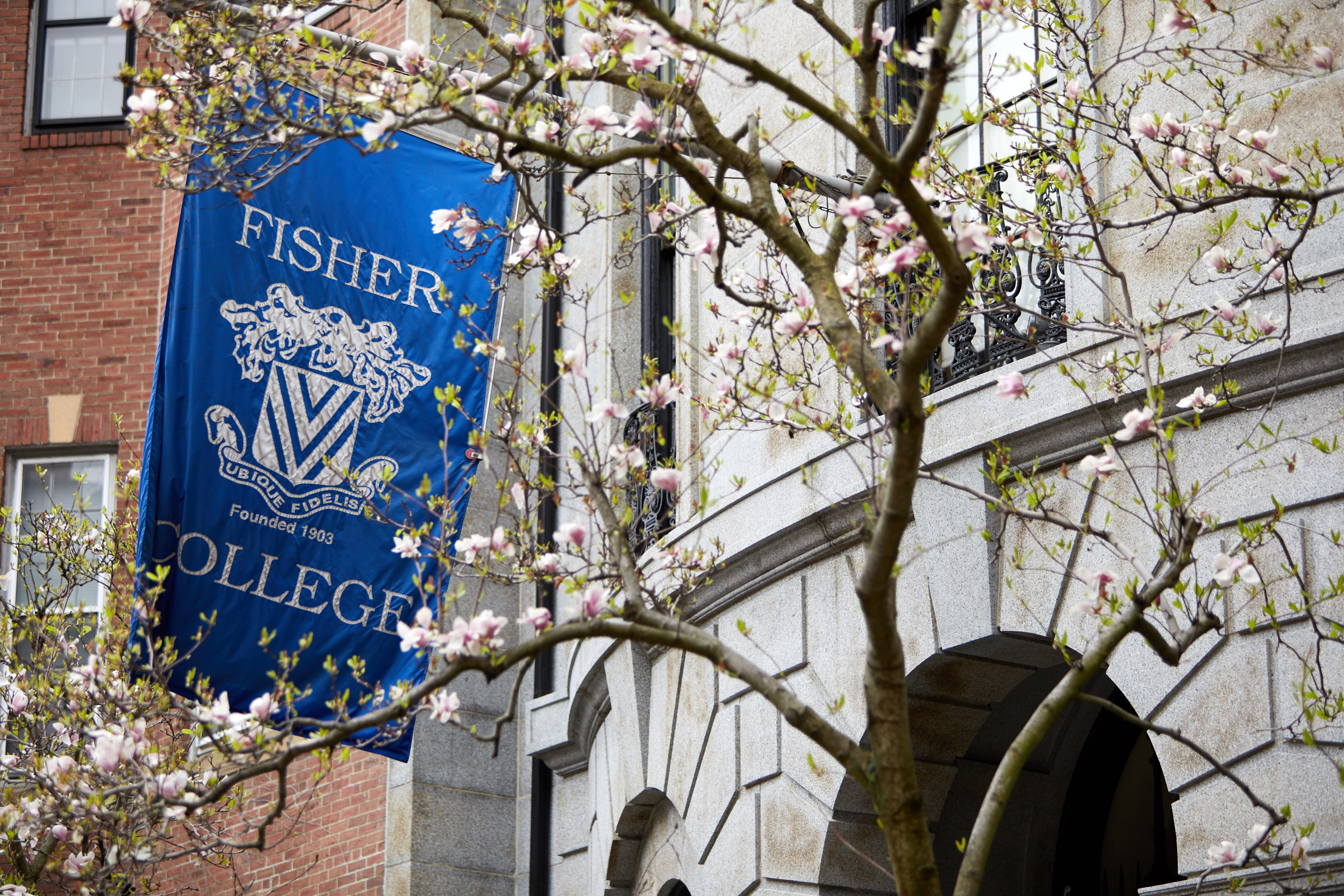
118 Beacon Street, the college's main entrance

As of Fall 2022, student population at Fisher College was 1,421, including Graduate and Professional Studies enrollments. Fifty percent of Fisher College students on-campus in Boston were from Massachusetts, 8% from the remaining New England area, 17% international, and 25% from other states in the U.S. 52% of students were male and 48% female.

== Athletics ==
The Fisher athletic teams are called the Falcons. The college is a member of the National Association of Intercollegiate Athletics (NAIA), primarily competing as an NAIA Independent within the Continental Athletic Conference since the 2012–13 academic year. The Falcons previously competed in the American Mideast Conference during the 2011–12 school year and in the Sunrise Conference from 2002–03 to 2010–11.

Fisher competes in 8 intercollegiate varsity sports. Men's sports include baseball, basketball, soccer and volleyball while women's sports include basketball, soccer, softball and volleyball.

== Esports ==
Fisher College Esports is the varsity-level esports program of Fisher College (Boston, Massachusetts). The program offers competitive teams across multiple gaming titles, a dedicated esports arena on campus, and scholarship opportunities for students participating in esports. In September 2022, Fisher College launched a full-fledged varsity esports program, becoming the first fully supported collegiate esports team in the Boston area. Over time, the program expanded its roster of game titles, regularly posting weekly competition updates and qualifying for post-season playoffs in numerous leagues. The esports program is housed in the “Fisher Esports Arena” at 108 Beacon St., Boston having over 100 high end computer stations. The program has won over 50 national titles across 18 unique games and consistently rank in the top five nationally in each sport.

Fisher College became the first collegiate team to qualify for a tier-one Counter-Strike event after winning the PGL Astana 2026 North America Closed Qualifier.
