= Thomas Michael McGovern =

- Occupation: College president

Dr Thomas McGovern was appointed the eighth president of Fisher College, Boston, United States in 2007, following thirty-eight years of working at the college.

== Education ==
McGovern earned his Ed.D. from Johnson & Wales University, an M.P.A. from Suffolk University, and a B.S. in Management from Northeastern University.

== Career ==
McGovern is a veteran of the U.S. Army.

Prior to joining Fisher College, Dr. McGovern developed and implemented a partnership with MassSAFE, the Traffic Safety Research Program in the Department of Civil and Environmental Engineering at the University of Massachusetts Amherst.

He also worked as a private consultant for many years, with clients including the American Management Association, the Governors Highway Safety Association, the National Highway Traffic Safety Administration, the Federal Highway Administration, NStar and AT&T.
