= SESAR European Airports Consortium =

SESAR European Airports Consortium is a member in the European public-private partnership that is managing the development phase of the Single European Sky ATM Research (SESAR) Programme .

== Overview ==
SEAC aims at participation in the SESAR project thus developing the future airport systems according to the ATM master plan.

== Legal basis ==
A consortium agreement defines how these close competitors will work together under the SESAR project.

== Funding and budget ==
SEAC is taking part in the 700M€ industrial share of the SJU PPP.

== Members ==
The members of the SEAC Consortium are:

- Aéroports de Paris ADP
- BAA Airports Ltd
- Flughafen München GmbH
- Fraport AG
- Schiphol Nederland B.V.
- Flughafen Zurich AG
- Avinor AS
