= South East Atlantic Conference =

The South East Atlantic Conference (SEAC) was an NAIA football conference founded in 2004. The last commissioner of the SEAC was Henry Smith, Sports Information Director/Director of Football Operations at Edward Waters College. Edward Waters won the inaugural SEAC title in 2004, followed by Concordia College, Selma in 2005, and Webber International University in 2006.

The 2007 SEAC Championship was shared between Edward Waters and Concordia. At the conclusion of the 2008 season, it was announced that the SEAC would be dissolved due to Concordia's inability to gain membership into the NAIA, also the conference's inability to gain other members. The final SEAC championship was shared between the three schools, all with identical 1–1 records against each other.

== Membership ==
- Concordia College, Selma, Alabama
- Edward Waters College, Jacksonville, Florida
- Webber International University, Babson Park, Florida
- Allen University (2004–2006; discontinued football program)
