= Vermont Technical College =

Public college in Vermont (1866–2023)

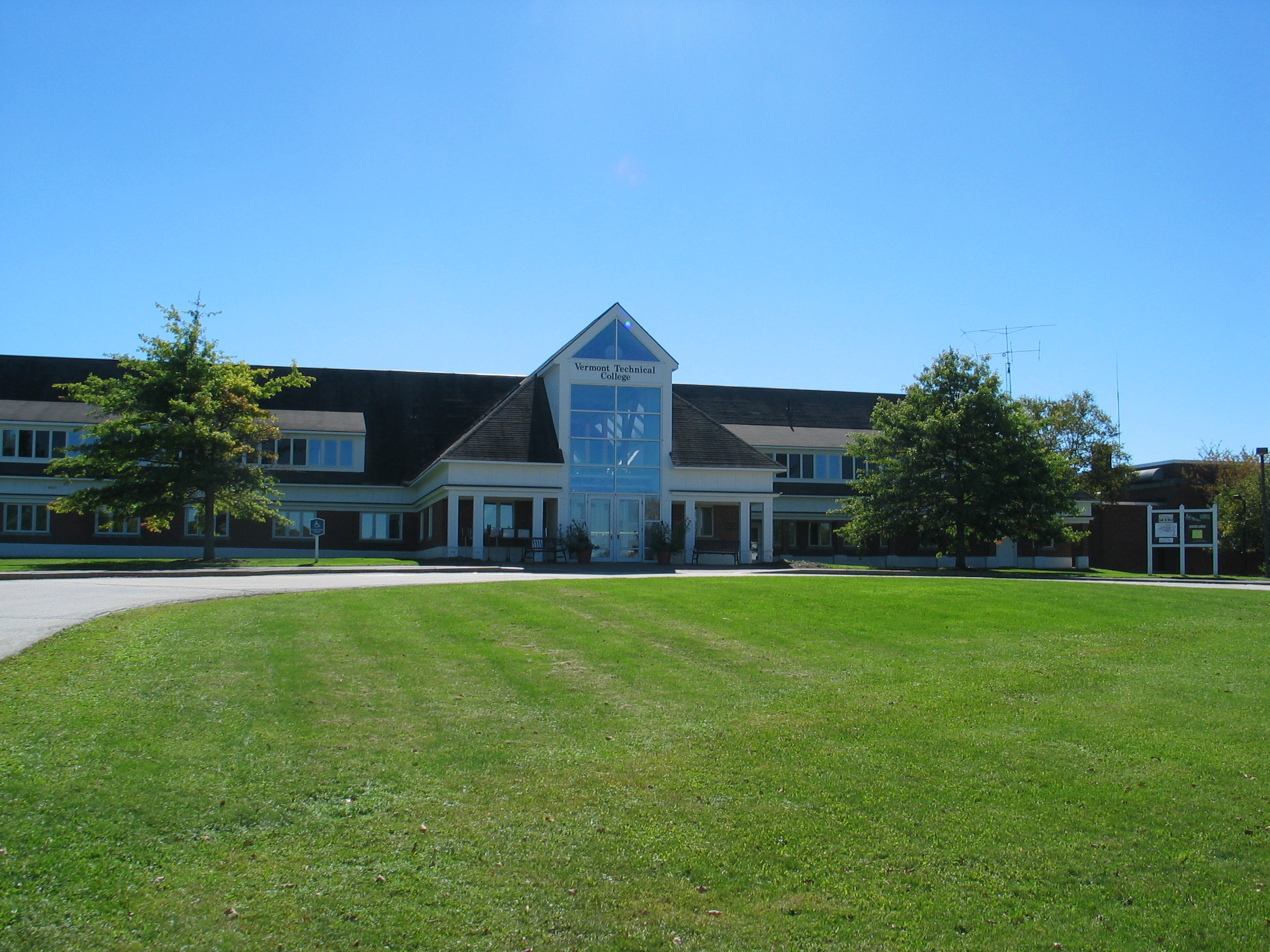
- Administration building at Vermont Technical College's Randolph Center campus
- Former names: Randolph Normal School (1866-1910); Vermont School of Agriculture (1910-1957)
- Type: Public
- Active: 1866–July 2023
- Location: Randolph Center and Williston, Vermont, United States
- Successor: Vermont State University
- Nickname: Knights
- Sporting affiliations: Yankee Small College Conference (2011–2023) Sunrise Athletic Conference (2006–2011)

Vermont Technical College (Vermont Tech or VTC) was a public technical college in Vermont. Its main residential campuses were located in Randolph Center and Williston. In addition, there were regional campuses distance sites, and nursing campuses in locations throughout the state.

Founded in 1866 as the Randolph Normal School, the mission of the school evolved through time, finally becoming a technical institute in 1957. On July 1, 2023, VTC merged with Northern Vermont University and Castleton University to become Vermont State University.

== History ==
In 1806, the Vermont House of Representatives passed a law creating the Orange County Grammar School in Randolph. The school provided education through the high school grades and by the 1850s its state mandate had expanded to include teacher training. In 1866, Edward Conant, the principal of the Orange County Grammar School, expanded its course offerings to make it a full-fledged normal school for the education and training of teachers. Later that year, the Vermont General Assembly passed legislation making the change official, and the school became the Randolph Normal School.

In 1910, the Randolph Normal School was selected by the legislature as the location for the Vermont School of Agriculture. In 1957, technical courses were added to the curriculum, and the Vermont School of Agriculture was renamed the Vermont Agriculture and Technical Institute (VATI). In 1962, VATI was authorized by the state to award associate degrees and became Vermont Technical College (VTC). VTC began awarding bachelor's degrees in 1993 and master's degrees in 2015.

For many years, the Vermont public colleges have experienced financial stress and chronic underfunding. Exacerbated by COVID-19, in April 2020, Vermont State Colleges system Chancellor Jeb Spaulding recommended closing the Vermont Technical College residential campus in Randolph as well as all operations/campuses of Northern Vermont University. Under the proposal, some of the Vermont Tech academic programs would be consolidated in Williston. The proposal was abandoned after public opposition, with the Vermont State Colleges instead announcing it would merge its four-year schools as Vermont State University.

== Academics ==
VTC offered bachelor's, master's, and associate degrees. Its five schools included: Agriculture, Plant, & Animal Sciences; Engineering & Computing; General Education; Nursing & Health Professions; and Professional Studies & Management. The schools offered degrees in over 50 majors.

== Athletics ==
The Vermont Tech athletic teams are called the Knights. The college is a member of the United States Collegiate Athletic Association (USCAA), primarily competing in the Yankee Small College Conference (YSCC) since the 2011–12 academic year. The Knights previously competed in the Sunrise Athletic Conference of the National Association of Intercollegiate Athletics (NAIA) from 2006–07 to 2010–11.

The Vermont State University Randolph Knights continue to play as of 2023.

== Student life ==
=== Student radio station ===
WVTC, Vermont Tech's 300-watt fully licensed radio station, broadcasts online and locally at 90.7 FM. The station is located at Morey Hall on VTC's Randolph Center campus. WVTC is operated and maintained by the students of VTC through the school's Radio Club, and is financially supported by VTC Student Council.

=== CubeSat lab ===
The Vermont Tech CubeSat Lab launched its first satellite, the Vermont Lunar CubeSat, a 1U CubeSat on November 19, 2013. Intended to orbit for three to five years, the satellite was fully functional until reentry on November 21, 2015. Vermont Tech's CubeSat was the first successful satellite launched by a New England college or university. Vermont Tech subsequently aided in developing the flight software for the Lunar IceCube, a satellite intended for deployment as part of the NASA Space Launch System's first flight in 2022.

== Notable people ==
=== Alumni ===
- Charles Bayley Adams, Randolph Normal School graduate who served as an associate justice of the Vermont Supreme Court.
- Berthold C. Coburn, member of the Vermont House of Representatives, Democratic nominee for governor in 1946
- Harry H. Cooley, Secretary of State of Vermont, Vermont School of Agriculture graduate (1913) and faculty member.
- Alexander Dunnett, Randolph Normal School graduate who served as US Attorney for Vermont, President of the Vermont Bar Association, a member of the Vermont Senate, and Caledonia County State's Attorney.
- Eugene Frederick Ladd, 1877 Randolph Normal School graduate who served as a brigadier general in the United States Army
- William B. Mayo, 1874 State Normal School graduate who became a prominent medical doctor, businessman, and state legislator in Northfield, Vermont
- Norman H. McAllister, member of the Vermont House of Representatives and Vermont Senate
- Robert A. Starr, member of the Vermont House of Representatives and Vermont Senate
- Larry Townsend, member of the Vermont House of Representatives from Randolph

=== Faculty and administrators ===
- Abel E. Leavenworth, Union Army veteran of the American Civil War; principal of the normal schools that are now Vermont Technical College and Castleton State College, as well as Bolivar Academy in Bolivar, Missouri.

== See also ==
- List of colleges and universities in the United States
- List of colleges and universities in Vermont
