= Sunrise Athletic Conference =

- Association: NAIA
- Founded: 2002
- Folded: 2011
- Commissioner: Dr. Royal Goheen
- Sports fielded: 10; men's: 5; women's: 5
- Division: Division II
- Region: Region X of the NAIA Northeastern United States
- Website: http://www.sunriseconference.com

Locations
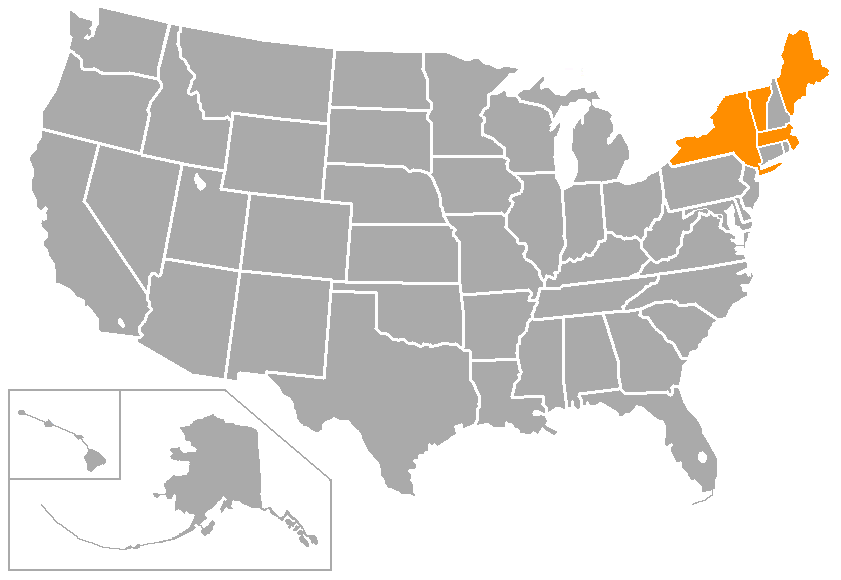

The Sunrise Athletic Conference was a college athletic conference founded in 2002 and affiliated with the National Association of Intercollegiate Athletics (NAIA). Its member institutions were in Maine, Massachusetts, New York, and Vermont.

== History ==
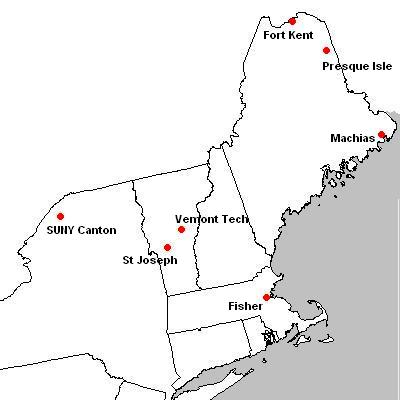
Map of the Sunrise Athletic Conference, circa 2011

The SAC was founded when both the Maine Athletic Conference and the Mayflower Conference disbanded in the spring of 2002. Both of these conferences were NAIA conferences of long standing. The conference formed with eight inaugural members: the College of St. Joseph, Fisher College, Lyndon State College, the University of Maine at Fort Kent, the University of Maine at Machias, the University of Maine at Presque Isle, Paul Smith's College and Vermont Technical College.

Royal Goheen became the commissioner of the Sunrise Conference and continued to serve as the only commissioner in the history of the SAC until it disbanded. In 1997, Goheen took on the role as the commissioner of the Maine Athletic Conference before its disbandment. In 2010 he was elected to the NAIA Hall of Fame.

In 2004, the Sunrise Conference added the State University of New York at Canton after the university joined the NAIA as part of a transition from two-year to four-year institution. The conference held steady with nine members until Paul Smith's College and Lyndon State College left in 2010, dropping SAC membership to seven.

The conference disbanded in 2011 when the College of St. Joseph, Vermont Technical College and the University of Maine at Machias left the conference and the NAIA for the United States Collegiate Athletic Association (USCAA) and the Yankee Small College Conference (YSCC). The University of Maine at Fort Kent, the University of Maine at Presque Isle, and the State University of New York at Canton then left with no regional NAIA competition to become independents in the USCAA.

In addition, Maine–Presque Isle is transitioning to an independent member of NCAA Division III, while SUNY Canton was accepted into the transition process to move from the NAIA to NCAA D-III. Fisher College joined the American Mideast Conference.

=== Chronological timeline ===
- 2002 – In the spring of 2002, the Sunrise Athletic Conference (a.k.a. the Sunrise) was founded due to dissolutions of the Maine Athletic Conference and the Mayflower Conference. Charter members included the College of St. Joseph, Fisher College, Lyndon State College (now Vermont State University at Lyndon), the University of Maine at Fort Kent (UMFK), the University of Maine at Machias (UMM), the University of Maine at Presque Isle (UMPI), Paul Smith's College and Vermont Technical College (now Vermont State University at Randolph), beginning the 2002–03 academic year.
- 2004 – The State University of New York at Canton (a.k.a. SUNY Canton) joined the Sunrise in the 2004–05 academic year.
- 2006 – Lyndon State (now Vermont State–Lyndon) left the Sunrise to join the Division III ranks of the National Collegiate Athletic Association (NCAA) after the 2005–06 academic year.
- 2010 – Paul Smith's left the Sunrise and the NAIA to join the United States Collegiate Athletic Association (USCAA) and the Yankee Small College Conference (YSCC) after the 2009–10 academic year.
- 2011 – The Sunrise would cease operations as an athletic conference after the 2010–11 academic year; as many schools left to join their respective new home primary conferences, beginning the 2011–12 academic year: Fisher to join the American Mideast Conference, while the rest would leave the NAIA and join the USCAA: St. Joseph, Vermont Tech (now Vermont State–Lyndon), Maine–Machias to join the YSCC; and Maine–Fort Kent, Maine–Presque Isle and SUNY Canton to join as USCAA Independents (the latter two are either accepted or in the process into transition from the NAIA to NCAA Division III).

== Member schools ==
=== Final members ===
The Sunrise had seven full members in the conference's final season, only two were private schools:

Institution	Location	Founded	Affiliation	Enrollment	Nickname	Joined (Note: Represents the calendar year when fall sports competition begins.)	Left (Note: Represents the calendar year when spring sports competition ends.)	Subsequent conference	Current conference
Fisher College	Boston, Massachusetts	1903	Nonsectarian	1,121	Falcons	2002	2011	American Mideast (2011–12)	Continental (2012–present)
University of Maine at Fort Kent	Fort Kent, Maine	1878	Public (Note: Part of the University of Maine System.)	1,339	Bengals	2002	2011	USCAA Independent (2011–present)	
University of Maine at Machias	Machias, Maine	1909	Public	1,200	Clippers	2002	2011	Yankee (YSCC) (Note: Currently an USCAA athletic conference.) (2011–20)	Suspended athletics
University of Maine at Presque Isle	Presque Isle, Maine	1903	Public	1,600	Owls	2002	2011	USCAA/D-III Independent (2011–17); American (ACAA) (Note: Currently an NCAA Division III athletic conference.) (2017–18)	North Atlantic (NAC) (2018–present)
College of St. Joseph	Rutland, Vermont	1956	Catholic (Diocese of Burlington)	500	Saints	2002	2011	Yankee (YSCC) (2011–19)	Closed in 2019
State University of New York at Canton	Canton, New York	1906	Public (Note: Part of the State University of New York System.)	3,320	Kangaroos	2004	2011	various (Note: SUNY–Canton had joined the following subsequent conferences: as an USCAA/D-III Independent from 2011–12 to 2016–17; the American Collegiate Athletic Association (ACAA) during the 2017–18 school year; and the North Atlantic Conference (NAC) from 2018–19 to –2023–24.)	State U. of New York (SUNYAC) (2024–present)
Vermont Technical College	Randolph, Vermont	1866	Public technical college	1,453	Knights	2002	2011	Yankee (YSCC) (2011–present)	

=== Former members ===
The Sunrise had two other full members during the conference's tenure, one was a private school:

Institution	Location	Founded	Affiliation	Enrollment	Nickname	Joined (Note: Represents the calendar year when fall sports competition begins.)	Left (Note: Represents the calendar year when spring sports competition ends.)	Subsequent conference(s)	Current conference
Lyndon State College (Note: Currently known as Northern Vermont University–Lyndon since 2018.)	Lyndon, Vermont	1911	Public (Note: Part of the Vermont State Colleges System.)	1,519	Hornets	2002	2006	D-III Independent (2006–08)	North Atlantic (NAC) (Note: Currently an NCAA Division III athletic conference.) (2008–present)
Paul Smith's College	Paul Smiths, New York	1946	Nonsectarian	1,000	Falcons (Note: Paul Smith's is now competing as the Paul Smith's Bobcats.)	2002	2010	Yankee (YSCC) (Note: Currently an USCAA athletic conference.) (2010–present)	

=== Membership timeline ===
Full member (non-football)

== Sports ==
Conference sports
Sport	Men's	Women's
Baseball	✓	
Basketball	✓	✓
Cross Country	✓	✓
Golf	✓	
Soccer	✓	✓
Softball		✓
Volleyball		✓

== Conference championships ==
Women Volleyball

- 2010 UMaine Fort Kent
- 2009 UMaine Presque Isle
- 2008 UMaine Presque Isle
- 2007 SUNY Canton
- 2006 UMaine Machias
- 2005 UMaine Machias

Men Cross Country

- 2010 SUNY Canton

Women Cross Country

- 2010 UMaine Presque Isle

Men Soccer

- 2010 UMaine Fort Kent
- 2009 UMaine Fort Kent
- 2008 UMaine Fort Kent
- 2007 UMaine Fort Kent
- 2006 UMaine Fort Kent

Women Soccer

- 2010 UMaine Fort Kent
- 2009 UMaine Fort Kent
- 2008 UMaine Fort Kent
- 2007 SUNY Canton
- 2006 UMaine Fort Kent

Men Basketball

- 2011 Fisher College
- 2010 UMaine Fort Kent
- 2009 Fisher College
- 2008 College of St. Joseph
- 2007 Fisher College
- 2006 Fisher College

Women Basketball

- 2011 UMain Machias
- 2010 UMaine Fort Kent
- 2009 UMaine Fort Kent
- 2008 UMaine Fort Kent
- 2007 College of St. Joseph
- 2006 UMaine Fort Kent

Men Golf

- 2010 UMaine Presque Isle
- 2008 UMaine Presque Isle

Baseball

- 2011 Fisher College
- 2010 Fisher College
- 2009 Fisher College
- 2008 Fisher College
- 2007 Fisher College
- 2006 Fisher College

Softball

- 2011 SUNY Canton
- 2010 SUNY Canton
- 2009 UMaine Presque Isle
- 2008 College of St. Joseph
- 2007 College of St. Joseph
