= Pioneer Stadium =

Multi-Use Stadium in California

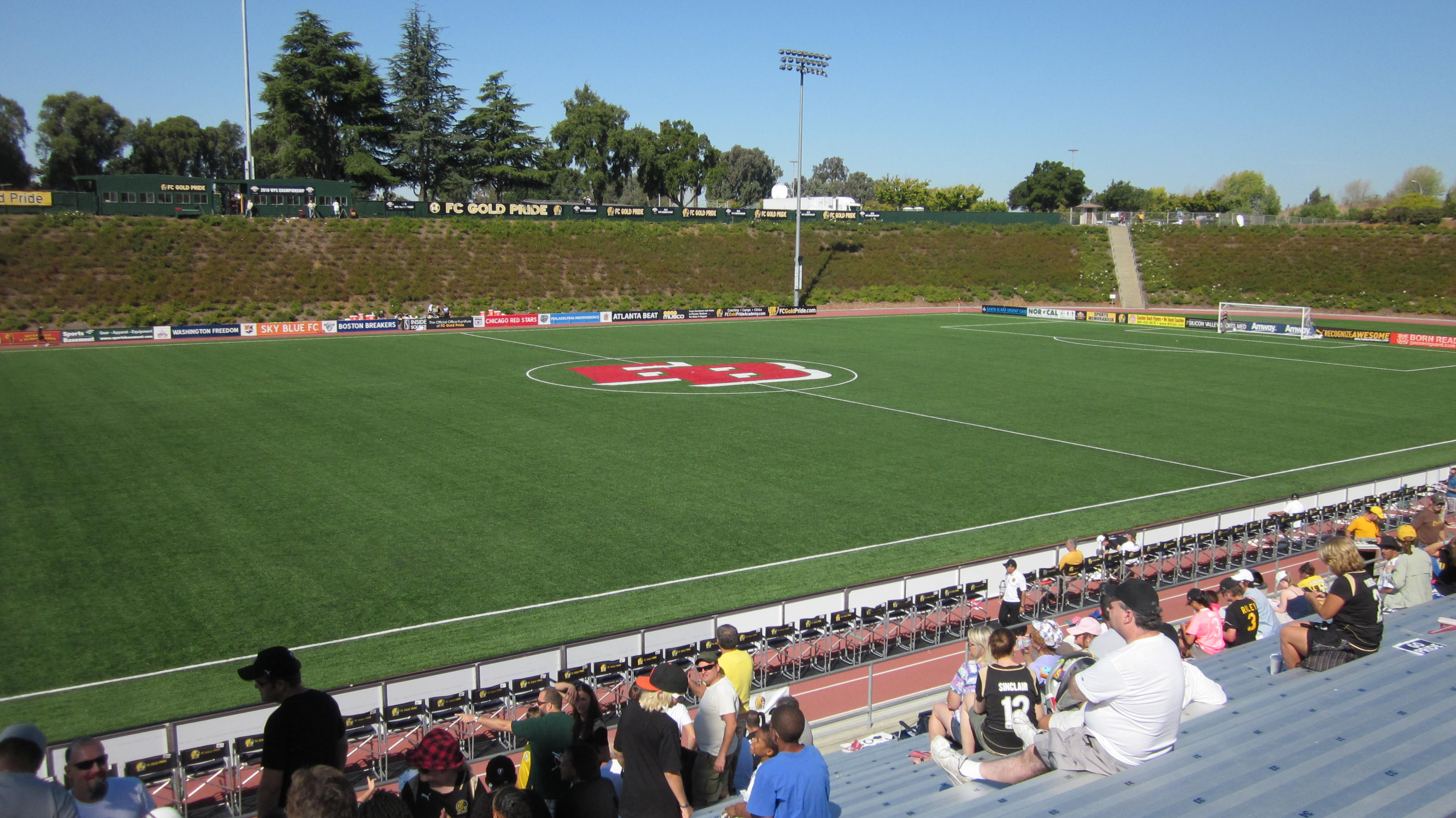
- Interior view of the stadium in 2010
- Interactive map of Pioneer Stadium
- Address: Hayward, CA; United States
- Coordinates: 37.6572968°N 122.0606697°W
- Owner: California State University, East Bay
- Operator: California East Bay Athletics
- Capacity: 5,000
- Type: Stadium
- Surface: Fieldturf
- Field size: 118 x 75 yards
- Current use: Soccer; Track and field
- Public transit: University Shuttle from Hayward: AC Transit: 60

Construction
- Opened: 1964; 62 years ago
- Renovated: 2010
- Cost: $1.9 million (renovation)
- Project manager: Jim Zavagno (renovation)

Tenants
- Cal State East Bay Pioneers (NCAA) teams: men's and women's soccer (1964–present); track and field (1964–present); football (1965–1993); Other teams: East Bay FC Stompers (NPSL) (2016–present); Oakland Roots SC (USLC) (2023–2024); Golden Gate Gales (ASL) (1980); Bay Area Seals (A-League) (2000); FC Gold Pride (WPS) (2010); Bay Area Breeze (W-League) (2014)

Website
- eastbaypioneers.com/stadium

Pioneer Stadium is a stadium owned and operated by California State University, East Bay in Hayward, California, United States. It currently hosts the East Bay Pioneers soccer and track and field teams.

The stadium also hosts the East Bay FC Stompers of the National Premier Soccer League (NPSL) since the team's debut season at this stadium in 2016. In past years, the stadium served as home venue for the East Bay American football team.

== History ==
Pioneer Stadium hosted the Cal State Hayward Pioneers football (back when the school was called California State University, Hayward). While the football team has historical success, most notably the 1969 team with a 9–1 record, the team later discontinued in 1993 due to financial issues and poor attendance.

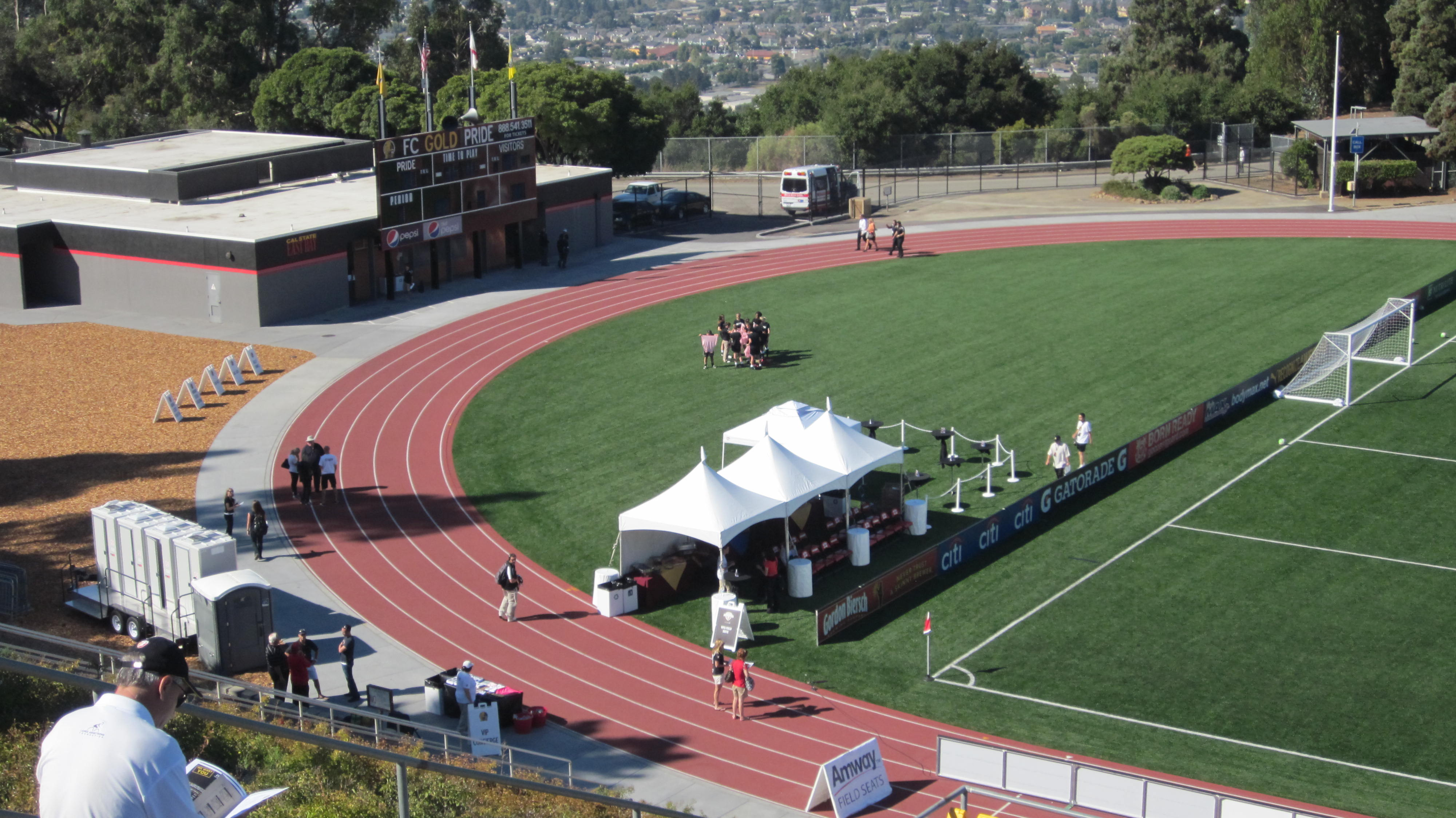
Stadium's athletics track in 2010

Since then, the stadium and the school have been without a football team. There has been talk of bringing football back to California State University, East Bay, but the possibility of it is unclear.

In 1980, the stadium was the initial home field for the Golden Gate Gales of the American Soccer League (ASL).

In 2010, the stadium hosted the short-lived, but successful FC Gold Pride of the Women's Professional Soccer (WPS) league, until the team discontinued in November of that year.

In April, 2023, due to field conditions at Laney College Stadium, Pioneer Stadium hosted a number of USL Championship games as the home stadium of the Oakland Roots SC, in addition to the Roots' US Open Cup game on April 4 against El Farolito. On May 1, Oakland Roots announced they would play their games at Pioneer Stadium full time for the 2023 season.

== Transportation ==
The stadium is accessible by the CSUEB Shuttle bus and AC Transit bus route 60. Both of which go from the Hayward BART Station to the bus stop next to the stadium at the intersection of Carlos Bee Blvd. and W. Loop Road.

== See also ==
- Pioneer Amphitheatre
- Pioneer Gym
