= American Mideast Conference =

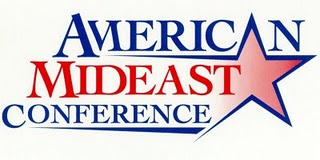
- Formerly: Mid-Ohio League (1949–1962); Mid-Ohio Conference (1962–1998)
- Association: NAIA
- Founded: 1949
- Folded: 2012
- Sports fielded: 15; men's: 7; women's: 8
- Division: Division II (until 2012)
- Headquarters: Findlay, Ohio
- Region: East; Region IX of the NAIA

Locations
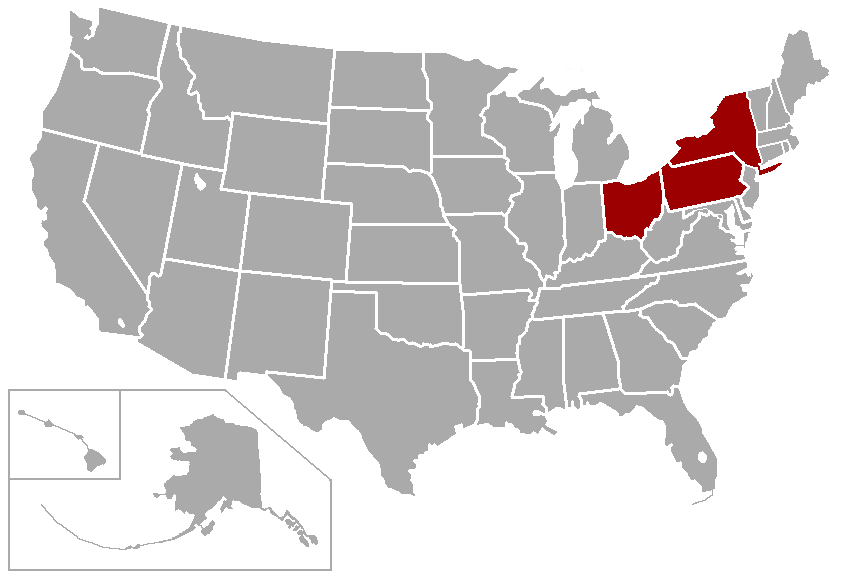

The American Mideast Conference (AMC) was an affiliate of the National Association of Intercollegiate Athletics that included eight member institutions in Ohio, Pennsylvania, New York, and Massachusetts. Founded in 1949, it was known as the Mid-Ohio League, and named the Mid-Ohio Conference from 1962 until 1998, when it adopted its final moniker. The name change was the first step in a multi-phase expansion that extended the conference into states beyond Ohio before the league was eventually disbanded in 2012.

== History ==
In its final five years the conference experienced a number of changes, with numerous members moving to the National Collegiate Athletic Association (NCAA). Former members Roberts Wesleyan and Walsh University received admission to the NCAA and underwent the process of transferring athletics into Division II; Houghton College transitioned to Division III and joined the Empire 8 conference in 2012–13. Daemen, Roberts Wesleyan, and Point Park applied for NCAA Division II status in June 2011 and in July Roberts Wesleyan was approved for membership. Also in June 2011 former AMC members Cedarville, Notre Dame College, Urbana, and Ursuline College announced the creation of a new NCAA DII conference that hoped to develop and expand for an anticipated lifting of the moratorium on new NCAA DII conferences in 2013. In July 2011, Cedarville and Notre Dame were awarded NCAA provisional status, while Malone University and Ursuline College were granted candidacy year two, all three left the NAIA and AMC for the 2011–12 academic year. With the addition of Fisher College from the collapsed Sunrise Athletic Conference, there were reports that the AMC would operate as an eight team conference in 2011–12 with the eight teams being Carlow, Daemen, Fisher, Houghton, Point Park, Roberts Wesleyan, Wilberforce, and Walsh. However, on January 12, 2012, the Kentucky Intercollegiate Athletic Conference (KIAC; now known as the River States Conference) announced that it had accepted Point Park University and Carlow University as full members beginning with the 2012–13 school year. This left Fisher College and Wilberforce University as the only remaining members, but as they have now become NAIA independent schools in the Association of Independent Institutions, the conference has been shut down.

=== Chronological timeline ===
- 1949 – The American Mideast Conference was founded as the Mid-Ohio League (MOL). Charter members included Ashland College (now Ashland University), Bluffton College (now Bluffton University), Cedarville College (now Cedarville University), Defiance College and Findlay College (now the University of Findlay), beginning the 1949–50 academic year.
- 1950 – Ohio Northern University joined the MOL in the 1950–51 academic year.
- 1955 – Wilmington College joined the MOL in the 1955–56 academic year.
- 1962:
  - Findlay and Ohio Northern left the MOL after the 1961–62 academic year.
  - The MOL had rebranded as the Mid-Ohio Conference (MOC) in the 1962–63 academic year.
- 1965 – Malone College (now Malone University) joined the MOC in the 1965–66 academic year.
- 1966 – Ashland left the MOC after the 1965–66 academic year.
- 1967 – Findlay rejoined the MOC for a second time in the 1967–68 academic year.
- 1971:
  - Bluffton, Defiance and Wilmington (with Findlay for a second time) left the MOC to form part as charter members of the Hoosier–Buckeye Collegiate Conference (HBCC) after the 1970–71 academic year.
  - Ohio Dominican College (now Ohio Dominican University), Rio Grande College (now the University of Rio Grande) and Urbana College (now Urbana University) joined the MOC in the 1971–72 academic year.
- 1973 – Tiffin University joined the MOC in the 1973–74 academic year.
- 1975 – Mount Vernon Nazarene College (now Mount Vernon Nazarene University) joined the MOC in the 1975–76 academic year.
- 1976 – Walsh College (now Walsh University) joined the MOC in the 1976–77 academic year.
- 1989 – Malone left the MOC after the 1988–89 academic year.
- 1991 – Shawnee State University joined the MOC in the 1991–92 academic year.
- 1993 – Two institutions rejoined the MOC (Findlay for a third time, and Malone for a second time) in the 1993–94 academic year.
- 1997 – Findlay left the MOC for a third time and the NAIA to join the Division II ranks of the National Collegiate Athletic Association (NCAA) and the Great Lakes Intercollegiate Athletic Conference (GLIAC) after the 1996–97 academic year.
- 1998:
  - The MOC had rebranded as the American Mideast Conference during its 50th anniversary in the 1998–99 academic year.
  - Geneva College, Notre Dame College and Saint Vincent College joined the American Mideast in the 1998–99 academic year.
- 1999 – Point Park College (now Point Park University), Seton Hill College (now Seton Hill University) and Wilberforce University joined the American Mideast in the 1999–2000 academic year.
- 2000 – Central State University joined the American Mideast in the 2000–01 academic year.
- 2001 – Carlow College (now Carlow University), Daemen College (now Daemen University), Houghton College (now Houghton University), Roberts Wesleyan College (now Roberts Wesleyan University) and Ursuline College joined the American Mideast in the 2001–02 academic year.
- 2002 – Central State left the American Mideast and the NAIA to join the NCAA Division II ranks as an NCAA D-II Independent after the 2001–02 academic year.
- 2006 – Saint Vincent left the American Mideast and the NAIA to join the NCAA Division III ranks and the Presidents' Athletic Conference (Presidents' [PAC]) after the 2005–06 academic year.
- 2007:
  - Three institutions left the American Mideast and the NAIA to join their respective new home primary conferences, all effective after the 2006–07 academic year:
    - Geneva to join the NCAA Division III ranks and the Presidents' (PAC)
    - Seton Hill to join the NCAA Division II ranks and the West Virginia Intercollegiate Athletic Conference (WVIAC)
    - and Tiffin to join the NCAA Division II ranks as an NCAA D-II Independent (who would later join the GLIAC, beginning the 2008–09 school year)
  - The University of Northwestern Ohio joined the American Mideast as an associate member for some sports in the 2007–08 academic year.
- 2008:
  - Urbana left the American Mideast and the NAIA to join the NCAA Division II ranks as an NCAA D-II Independent (who would later join the Great Midwest Athletic Conference (G-MAC) beginning the 2012–13 school year) after the 2007–08 academic year.
  - Northwestern Ohio had upgraded to full membership within the American Mideast for all sports in the 2008–09 academic year.
- 2009 – Two institutions left the American Mideast to join their respective new home primary conferences, both effective after the 2008–09 academic year:
  - Ohio Dominican to leave the NAIA to join the NCAA Division II ranks as an NCAA D-II Independent (who would later join the GLIAC, beginning the 2010–11 school year)
  - and Rio Grande to the Mid-South Conference
- 2010 – Two institutions left the American Mideast to join their respective new home primary conferences, both effective after the 2009–10 academic year:
  - Northwestern Ohio to the Wolverine–Hoosier Athletic Conference (WHAC)
  - and Shawnee State to the Mid-South Conference (MSC)
- 2011:
  - Five institutions left the American Mideast to join their respective new home primary conferences, all effective after the 2010–11 academic year:
    - Cedarville, Notre Dame (Oh.) and Ursuline (with Malone for a second time) to leave the NAIA to join the NCAA Division II ranks as NCAA D-II Independents (which Cedarville and Ursuline later join the G-MAC; Malone would later join the GLIAC beginning the 2012–13 school year; and Notre Dame (Oh.) would later join the Mountain East Conference (MEC), beginning the 2013–14 school year)
    - and Mount Vernon Nazarene to the Crossroads League
  - Fisher College joined the American Mideast in the 2011–12 academic year.
- 2012 – The American Mideast ceased operations as an athletic conference after the 2011–12 academic year; as many schools left to join their respective new home primary conferences, beginning the 2012–13 school year:
  - Roberts Wesleyan to leave the NAIA to join the NCAA Division II ranks and the East Coast Conference (ECC; formerly known as the New York Collegiate Athletic Conference [NYCAC])
  - Houghton to leave the NAIA to join the NCAA Division III ranks and the Empire 8 Athletic Conference (Empire 8 or E8)
  - Walsh to leave the NAIA to join the NCAA Division II ranks and the GLIAC
  - Carlow and Point Park to the Kentucky Intercollegiate Athletic Conference (KIAC; now known as the River States Conference [RSC])
  - and Daemen, Fisher and Wilberforce as NAIA Independents within the Association of Independent Institutions (although Daemen would later follow Roberts Wesleyan to join the NCAA D-II ECC, beginning the 2013–14 school year)

== Member schools ==
A list of past members of the American Mideast Conference:

=== Final members ===
The American Mideast ended with eight full members, all were private schools:

Institution	Location	Founded	Affiliation	Enrollment	Joined (Note: Represents the calendar year when fall sports competition begins.)	Left (Note: Represents the calendar year when spring sports competition ends.)	Nickname	Subsequent conference(s)	Current conference
Carlow University	Pittsburgh, Pennsylvania	1929	Catholic (R.S.M.)	2,400	2001	2012	Celtics	River States (RSC) (2012–23)	Allegheny Mountain (AMCC) (Note: Currently an NCAA Division III athletic conference.) (2023–present)
Daemen College (Note: Currently known as Daemen University since 2022.)	Amherst, New York	1947	Nonsectarian	2,100	2001	2012	Wildcats	USCAA/D-II Independent (2012–13)	East Coast (ECC) (Note: Currently an NCAA Division II athletic conference.) (2013–present)
Fisher College	Boston, Massachusetts	1903	Nonsectarian	1,121	2011	2012	Falcons	Continental (2012–present)	
Houghton College (Note: Currently known as Houghton University since 2022.)	Houghton, New York	1883	Wesleyan	1,300	2001	2012	Highlanders	Empire 8 (2012–present)	
Point Park University	Pittsburgh, Pennsylvania	1960	Nonsectarian	3,376	1999	2012	Pioneers	River States (RSC) (2012–24)	Mountain East (MEC) (2024–present)
Roberts Wesleyan College (Note: Currently known as Roberts Wesleyan University since 2022.)	Chili, New York	1866	Free Methodist	2,000	2001	2012	Redhawks	East Coast (ECC) (2012–present)	
Walsh University	North Canton, Ohio	1958	Catholic (Diocese of Youngstown)	2,500	1976	2012	Cavaliers	Great Lakes (GLIAC) (2012–17)	Great Midwest (G-MAC) (2017–present)
Wilberforce University	Wilberforce, Ohio	1856	Methodist (A.M.E. Church) (Note: Also a historically black college and university.)	900	1999	2012	Bulldogs	various (Note: Wilberforce had joined the following subsequent conferences: as an NAIA Independent (Continental Athletic Conference [CAC] since 2021–22) from 2012–13 to 2021–22; the Mid-South Conference in 2022–23; and the CAC again in 2023–24.)	HBCU (HBCUAC) (2024–present)

=== Members leaving before 2012 ===
The American Mideast had 21 former full members, all but two were private schools:

Institution	Location	Founded	Affiliation	Enrollment	Joined (Note: Represents the calendar year when fall sports competition begins.)	Left (Note: Represents the calendar year when spring sports competition ends.)	Nickname	Subsequent conference(s)	Current conference
Ashland College (Note: Currently known as Ashland University since 1989.)	Ashland, Ohio	1878	Brethren	6,500	1949	1966	Eagles	various (Note: Ashland had joined the following subsequent conferences: as an NCAA College Division/D-II Independent from 1966–67 to 1977–78; the Great Lakes Valley Conference (Note: Currently an NCAA Division II athletic conference.) (GLVC) from 1978–79 to 1994–95; and the Great Lakes Intercollegiate Athletic Conference (GLIAC) from 1995–96 to 2020–21.)	Great Midwest (G-MAC) (2021–present)
Bluffton College (Note: Currently known as Bluffton University since 2004.)	Bluffton, Ohio	1899	Mennonite	1,149	1949	1971	Beavers	NAIA/Coll. Div./ D-III Independent (1971–98)	Heartland (HCAC) (Note: Currently an NCAA Division III athletic conference.) (1998–present)
Cedarville University	Cedarville, Ohio	1887	Baptist/ Evangelical	3,077	1949	2011	Yellow; Jackets	NAIA/D-II Independent (2011–12)	Great Midwest (G-MAC) (2012–present)
Central State University	Wilberforce, Ohio	1887	Public (Note: Also a historically black college and university.)	2,799	2000	2002	Marauders & Lady Marauders	D-II Independent (2002–12); Great Midwest (G-MAC) (2012–15)	Southern (SIAC) (2015–present)
Defiance College	Defiance, Ohio	1850	United; Church of Christ	1,000	1949	1971	Yellow Jackets	various (Note: Ashland had joined the following subsequent conferences: as an NAIA/Coll. Div./ D-III Independent from 1971–72 to 1996–97; the Michigan Intercollegiate Athletic Association (MIAA) from 1997–98 to 1999–2000; and the Heartland Collegiate Athletic Conference (HCAC) from 2000–01 to 2023–24.)	Wolverine–Hoosier (WHAC) (2024–present)
University of Findlay	Findlay, Ohio	1882	Churches of God	4,600	1949; 1967; 1993	1962; 1971; 1997	Oilers	Great Lakes (GLIAC) (1997–2017)	Great Midwest (G-MAC) (2017–present)
Geneva College	Beaver Falls, Pennsylvania	1848	Reformed; Presbyterian	1,791	1998	2007	Golden; Tornadoes	Presidents' (PAC) (2007–present)	
Malone University	Canton, Ohio	1892	Evangelical	2,385	1965; 1993	1989; 2011	Pioneers	D-II Independent (2011–12); Great Lakes (GLIAC) (2012–16)	Great Midwest (G-MAC) (2016–present)
Mount Vernon Nazarene University	Mount Vernon, Ohio	1968	Nazarene	2,675	1975	2011	Cougars	Crossroads (2011–present)	
University of Northwestern Ohio	Lima, Ohio	1920	Nonsectarian	4,200	2008 (Note: Northwestern Ohio joined the American Midwest as an associate (provisional) member during the 2007–08 school year.)	2010	Racers	Wolverine–Hoosier (WHAC) (2010–present)	
Notre Dame College	South Euclid, Ohio	1927	Catholic (Diocese of Cleveland)	2,000	1998	2011	Falcons	D-II Independent (2011–13); Mountain East (MEC) (2013–24)	Closed in 2024
Ohio Dominican University	Columbus, Ohio	1911	Catholic (O.P.)	3,052	1971	2009	Panthers	NAIA/D-II Independent (2009–10); Great Lakes (GLIAC) (2010–17)	Great Midwest (G-MAC) (2017–present)
Ohio Northern University	Ada, Ohio	1871	United; Methodist	3,721	1950	1962	Polar Bears	NAIA Independent (1962–73)	Ohio (OAC) (1973–present)
University of Rio Grande	Rio Grande, Ohio	1876	Nonsectarian	2,300	1971	2009	RedStorm	Mid-South (MSC) (2009–14)	River States (RSC) (2014–present)
Saint Vincent College	Latrobe, Pennsylvania	1846	Catholic (Benedictines)	1,840	1999	2006	Bearcats	Presidents' (PAC) (2006–present)	
Seton Hill University	Greensburg, Pennsylvania	1883	Catholic (Sisters of Charity)	2,014	1999	2007	Griffins	West Virginia (WVIAC) (2007–13)	Pennsylvania (PSAC) (2013–present)
Shawnee State University	Portsmouth, Ohio	1986	Public	4,600	1991	2010	Bears	Mid-South (MSC) (2010–23); River States (RSC) (2023–26)	Mountain East (MEC) (2026–present)
Tiffin University	Tiffin, Ohio	1888	Nonsectarian	4,942	1973	2007	Dragons	D-II Independent (2007–08); Great Lakes (GLIAC) (2008–18)	Great Midwest (G-MAC) (2018–present)
Urbana University	Urbana, Ohio	1850	Nonsectarian	1,505	1971	2008	Blue Knights	various (Note: Urbana had joined the following subsequent conferences: as an NCAA D-II Independent from 2008–09 to 2011–12; the Great Midwest Athletic Conference (G-MAC) during the 2012–13 school year; and the Mountain East Conference (MEC) from 2013–14 to 2019–20.)	Closed in 2020
Ursuline College (Note: This institution is a women's college, therefore it does not field men's sports.)	Pepper Pike, Ohio	1871	Catholic (Ursulines)	1,103	2001	2011	Arrows	D-II Independent (2011–12)	Great Midwest (G-MAC) (2012–present)
Wilmington College	Wilmington, Ohio	1870	Quakers	1,200	1955	1971	Quakers	NAIA/Coll. Div./ D-III Independent (1971–98); Heartland (HCAC) (1998–2000)	Ohio (OAC) (2000–present)

=== Membership timeline ===
Full member (non-football)

== Sports ==
The AMC formerly sponsored 15 sports:

- Women's championships: cross-country, soccer, volleyball, basketball, softball, golf, tennis, track and field
- Men's championships: cross-country, soccer, basketball, baseball, golf, tennis, track and field

== Administration ==
Presidents of member institutions maintained active rolls of governance over the organization by way of the Council of Presidents.

Additionally, the AMC included a staff of conference officials:

- James D. Houdeshell, Commissioner
- Mark Womack, AMC Administrative Assistant
- Deron Brown, Supervisor of Umpires, Baseball
- Linda Cairney, Supervisor of Umpires, Softball
- Bill Ek, Supervisor of Officials, Basketball
- Karen Fulks, Treasurer
- James Phipps, Eligibility Chair
- Diane Plas, Supervisor of Officials, Women's Basketball, Volleyball
- Kim Vieira, Supervisor of Officials, Men's and Women's soccer

== See also ==
- List of NAIA conferences
- List of NAIA institutions
