= Edward Laning =

American painter (1906–1981)

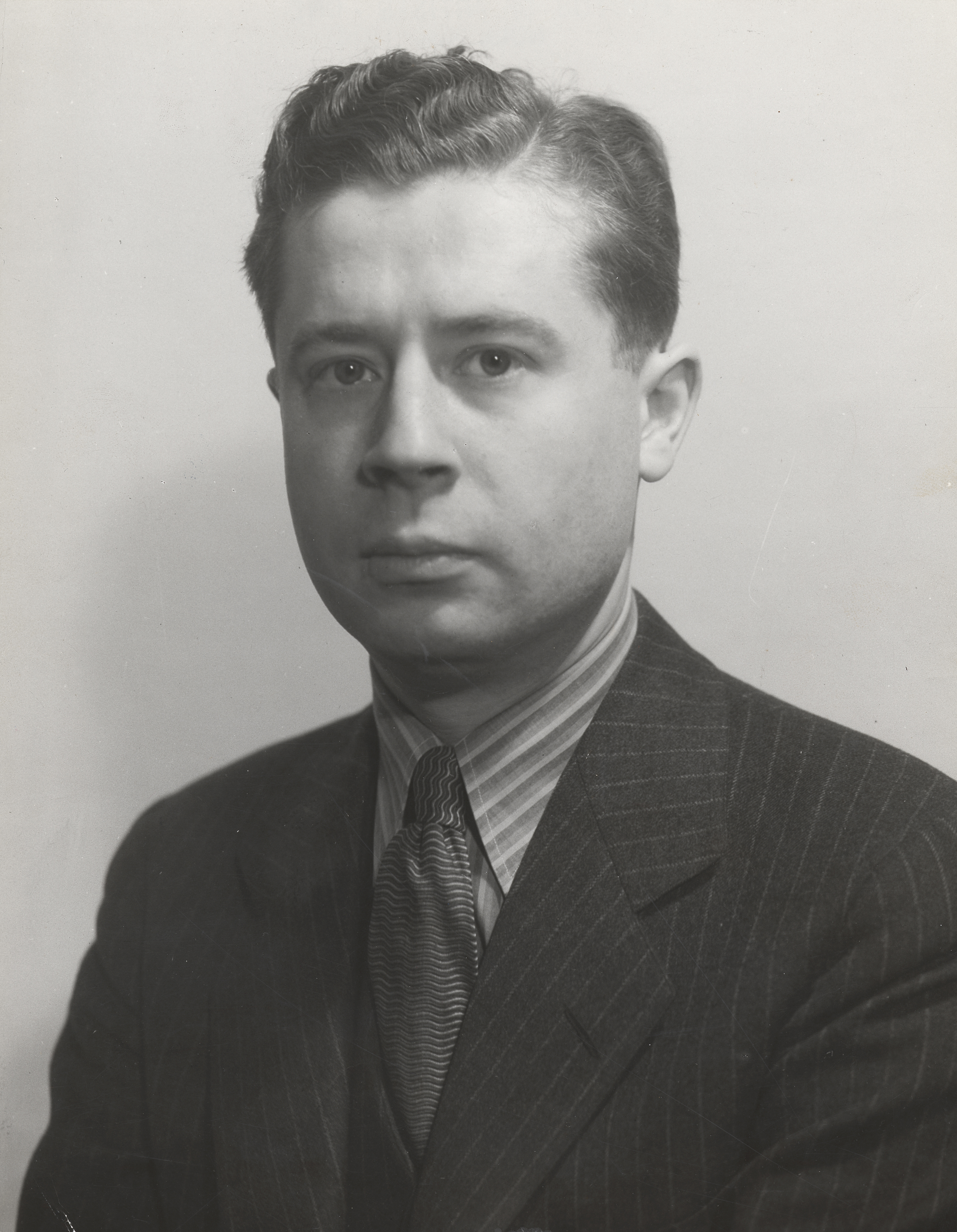
- Edward Laning, 1937 (Archives of American Art collection)
- Born: April 26, 1906; Petersburg, Illinois, United States
- Died: May 1981 (aged 75); New York City
- Education: Art Institute of Chicago, University of Chicago, Art Students League
- Known for: Painting
- Notable work: "The Story of the Recorded Word"
- Spouse: Mary Fife Laning

Edward Laning (1906–1981) was an American painter.

== Career ==
=== Background ===
Laning was born in 1906 in Petersburg, Illinois.

He studied at the Art Institute of Chicago (1923–1924) and the University of Chicago, (1925–1927). He also studied at the Art Students League with Max Weber, Boardman Robinson, John Sloan and Kenneth Hayes Miller (1927–1930).

On August 26, 1933, he married the painter and printmaker Mary Fife, whom he had met at the Art Students League.

=== Paintings, murals ===
In 1931, Laning's work formed part of the first major show at the newly formed Whitney Museum of American Art. He painted murals for the Works Progress Administration during the Great Depression as well as a post office mural in Rockingham, North Carolina (1937). In 1935, he painted the Ellis Island murals (chosen over Japanese-American artist Hideo Noda):

It was a great relief to PWA, to the College Art Association, to Architects Harvey Wiley Corbett and Chester Holmes Aldrich and to Edward Laning last week to learn that Commissioner of Immigration & Naturalization Rudolph Reimer at Ellis Island had finally approved Artist Laning's designs for murals for the dining hall at New York's immigrant station. Cheered, Muralist Laning and his two assistants, James Rutledge and Albert Soroka, hustled to get his cartoons on tempera and gesso panels as soon as possible.

In 1937, he painted murals in the New York Public Library, including his most famous work, The Story of the Recorded Word.

In 1980, Laning came to Ogden, Utah, to personally oversee the installation of his two 50-foot by 12-foot murals in the Grand Lobby of the historic Ogden Railway Station. The northern side depicts the Union Pacific company coming from Omaha, Nebraska, and the southern side depicts the Central Pacific coming from Sacramento, California. The National Academy of Design of New York City granted $100,000 to Union Station as his commission.

=== Teaching ===
Laning taught art at the Art Students League (1932–33, 1945–50, 1952), and the Kansas City Art Institute. He was a member of the American Society of Painters, Sculptors and Gravers and the National Academy of Design. He served as president of the National Society of Mural Painters from 1970 to 1974.

=== Death ===
Laning died in 1981 in New York, survived by his wife, artist Mary Fife Laning.

== Works ==
Laning's works have been displayed at the Art Institute of Chicago (1945), the Carnegie Institute (1945), and the Virginia Museum of Fine Arts (1944–45). His works can be viewed at the Metropolitan Museum of Art, the Whitney Museum of American Art, and the Richmond Professional Institute. In addition, his works can be seen at the New York Public Library and U.S. post offices in Rockingham, North Carolina and Bowling Green, Kentucky. In assessing his works, the Smithsonian Institution writes:

In his work, Laning expressed his disenchantment with the political and social uncertainties of post-Depression America and his perception of the degradation of American values; in several paintings he used fire as a symbol of impending societal destruction.

=== Art ===
- Fourteenth Street (1931)
- 1929 Crash (1929?)
- Pantheon (1937)
- New York Public Library murals (1937):
  - The Story of the Recorded Word
  - Learning to Read
  - History of the Written Word
- The Role of the Immigrant in the Industrial Development of American (1937)
- The Past as Connecting Threads in Human Life, triptych, USPO, Rockingham, North Carolina (1937)
- The Escape
- Coney Island Beach Scene (1938)
- Prometheus (1942)
- Armor in Alaska (1943)
- Kiska Raid (1943)
- Florence August 1944 (1944)
- Saturday Afternoon at Sportsmans Park (c. 1945)
- The Building (c. 1955)
- Union Pacific (north side mural at Union Station) (1980)
- Central Pacific (south side mural at Union Station) (1980)

=== Writings ===
- Perspective for Artists (1967)
- The Act of Drawing (1971)
- The Sketch Books of Reginald Marsh

=== Editing ===
- Sketchbooks of Reginald Marsh, compiled by Edward Laning (1973)

=== Illustrations ===
- Hello, the Boat! by Phyllis Crawford with pictures by Edward Laning (1938)
