= Alexander Hamilton U.S. Custom House =

Building in Manhattan, New York

- U.S. National Register of Historic Places
- U.S. National Historic Landmark
- U.S. Historic district – Contributing property
- New York State Register of Historic Places
- New York City Landmark
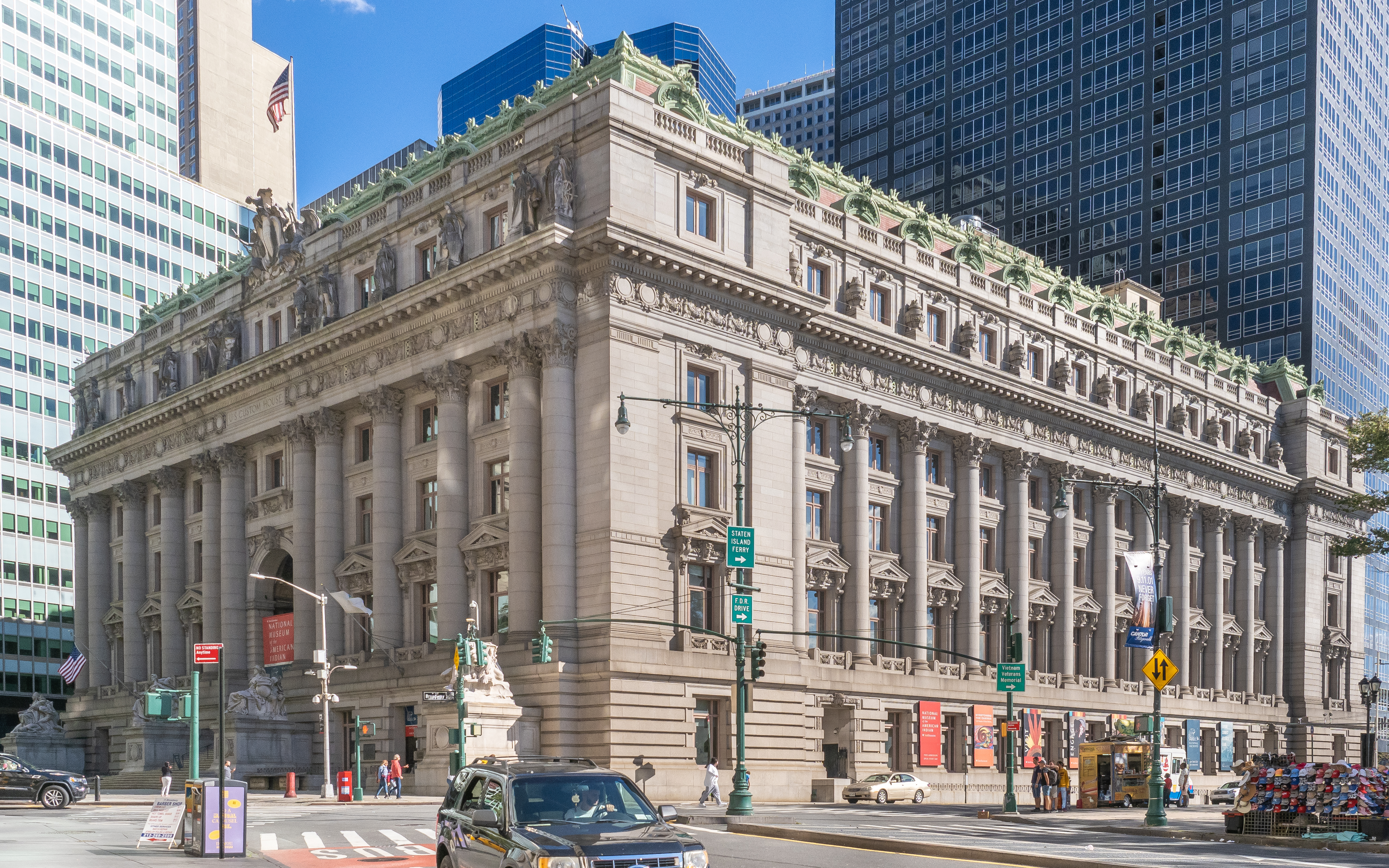
- The northern (left) and western (right) facades of the Custom House in 2021
- Interactive map of Alexander Hamilton U.S. Custom House
- Location: 1 Bowling Green; Manhattan, New York
- Coordinates: 40°42′15″N 74°00′49″W
- Built: 1901–1907
- Architect: Cass Gilbert
- Architectural style: Beaux-Arts
- Part of: Wall Street Historic District (ID07000063)
- NRHP reference No.: 72000889
- NYSRHP No.: 06101.000049
- NYCL No.: 0020, 1022

Significant dates
- Added to NRHP: January 31, 1972
- Designated NHL: December 8, 1976
- Designated CP: February 20, 2007
- Designated NYSRHP: June 23, 1980
- Designated NYCL: October 14, 1965 (exterior); January 9, 1979 (interior)

The Alexander Hamilton U.S. Custom House (originally the New York Custom House) is a government building, museum, and former custom house at 1 Bowling Green, near the southern end of Manhattan in New York City, New York, United States. Designed by Cass Gilbert in the Beaux-Arts style, it was erected from 1902 to 1907 by the government of the United States as a headquarters for the Port of New York's duty collection operations. The building contains the George Gustav Heye Center museum, the United States Bankruptcy Court for the Southern District of New York, and the New York regional offices of the National Archives. The facade and part of the interior are New York City designated landmarks, and the building is listed on both the New York State Register of Historic Places and the National Register of Historic Places (NRHP) as a National Historic Landmark. It is also a contributing property to the Wall Street Historic District, listed on the NRHP.

The Custom House is a seven-story steel-framed structure with a stone facade and elaborate interiors. The exterior is decorated with nautical motifs and sculptures by twelve artists. The second through fourth stories contain colonnades with Corinthian columns. The main entrance consists of a grand staircase flanked by Four Continents, a set of four statues by Daniel Chester French. The second-story entrance vestibule leads to a transverse lobby, a rotunda, and offices. The rotunda includes a skylight and ceiling murals by Reginald Marsh. The George Gustav Heye Center, a branch of the National Museum of the American Indian, operates on the ground and second stories, while the upper stories contain U.S. government offices.

The building was proposed in 1889 as a replacement for the previous New York Custom House at 55 Wall Street. Because of various disagreements, the Bowling Green Custom House was not approved until 1899; Gilbert was selected as architect following a competition. The building opened in 1907, and the murals in the rotunda were added in 1938 during a Works Progress Administration project. The United States Customs Service moved out of the building in 1974, and it remained vacant for over a decade until renovations in the late 1980s. The Custom House was renamed in 1990 to commemorate Alexander Hamilton, one of the Founding Fathers of the United States and its first secretary of the treasury. The Heye Center opened in 1994.

== Site ==
The Alexander Hamilton U.S. Custom House occupies a trapezoidal plot bounded by Bowling Green to the north, Whitehall Street to the east, Bridge Street to the south, and State Street to the west. The Whitehall Street and State Street elevations are 300 feet (90 m) wide; the main elevation on Bowling Green is 200 feet (60 m) wide; and the rear elevation on Bridge Street is 290 feet (88 m) wide. As of 2023, a concrete retaining wall measuring 16 feet (4.9 m) deep was being built around the building. Nearby buildings include the International Mercantile Marine Company Building and the Bowling Green Offices Building to the northwest, 26 Broadway to the northeast, 2 Broadway to the east, and One Battery Park Plaza to the south.

There are entrances to two New York City Subway stations immediately outside the Custom House. An entrance to the Whitehall Street station is adjacent to the eastern side of the building, while an entrance to the Bowling Green station is to the north. The building occupies the site of Fort Amsterdam, constructed by the Dutch West India Company to defend their operations in the Hudson Valley. The Dutch colony of New Amsterdam, the precursor to modern-day New York City, was developed around the fort. Bowling Green, immediately to the north, is the oldest park in New York City. The Government House occupied the site in the late 18th century before its demolition in 1815. The houses of several wealthy New Yorkers were subsequently developed at that location.

== Architecture ==
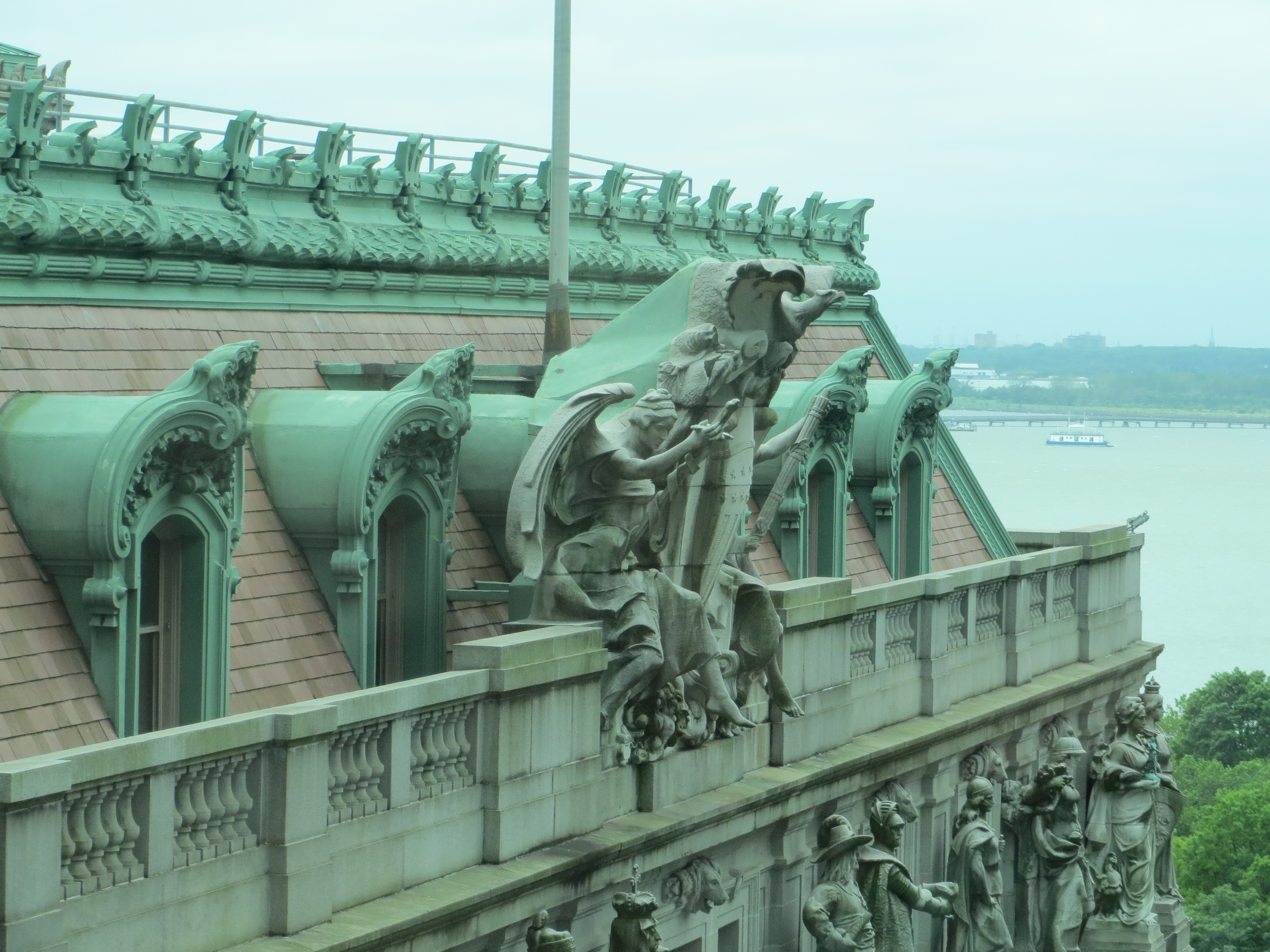
Roof detail

The Alexander Hamilton U.S. Custom House is seven stories high with a stone facade and an interior steel frame. It was designed by Cass Gilbert in the Beaux-Arts style. The design is similar to those of previous custom houses in New York City, namely Ithiel Town's Federal Hall at 26 Wall Street and Isaiah Rogers's Merchants' Exchange building at 55 Wall Street.

The building's design incorporates Beaux-Arts and City Beautiful planning principles, combining architecture, engineering, and fine arts. Gilbert had written in 1900 about his plans for a wide-ranging, site-specific decorative program, which would "illustrate the commerce of ancient and modern times, both by land and sea". Sculptures, paintings, and decorations by well-known artists of the time, such as Daniel Chester French, Karl Bitter, Louis Saint-Gaudens, and Albert Jaegers, embellish various portions of the interior and exterior.

U.S. Customs and Border Protection owns the Custom House. The building houses the Smithsonian Institution, the National Archives and Records Administration, the United States Bankruptcy Court for the Southern District of New York, and offices for the United States Department of Transportation.

=== Facade ===
Unlike most custom houses, which face the waterfront, the Alexander Hamilton Custom House faces inland toward Bowling Green. Its main entrance is on the northern facade, the only side that does not overlook the Lower Manhattan waterfront. The exterior is decorated throughout with nautical motifs such as dolphins and waves, interspersed with classical icons such as acanthus leaves and urns.

The first-floor facade is composed of rusticated blocks and is 20 feet (6.1 m) tall. There are six entrances to the building. The main entrance is on the northern elevation, where a wide stairway leads to the second floor. Under the main entrance arch is a carving of the municipal arms of the city of New York. The keystone at the top of the arch depicts the head of Columbia, the female personification of the United States, and was designed by Vicenzo Albani. Andrew O'Connor created a cartouche for the space above the main entrance. The lintel above the main entrance, quarried in Maine, weighed 50 short tons (45 metric tons) and measured 30 by 8 feet (9.1 by 2.4 m).

The second through fourth stories contain engaged columns in the Corinthian style; some of these columns are paired while the others are single. There are 44 columns in total: twelve each on the north, east, and west elevations and eight on the south elevation. The second story is the piano nobile; the windows on this story are flanked by brackets and capped by enclosed pediments, with carved heads above them (see § Sculptures). The third- and fourth-story windows, conversely, are less ornately decorated; this was normal for Beaux-Arts buildings, which generally had greater detailing on the more visible lower levels. The lintels above the third-story windows are decorated with wave motifs, while those above the fourth floor depict shells. The center portion of the Bridge Street facade reaches only to the third story.

The fifth-story facade consists of a full-story entablature with a frieze, interspersed with small rectangular windows featuring intersecting tracery crosses. Above rise two more stories; the seventh story is housed in a red-slate mansard roof with dormer windows and copper cresting. The mansard roof is extremely steep, and the seventh-story attic underneath has a full floor of usable space.

==== Sculptures ====
The Four Continents sculptures by Daniel Chester French

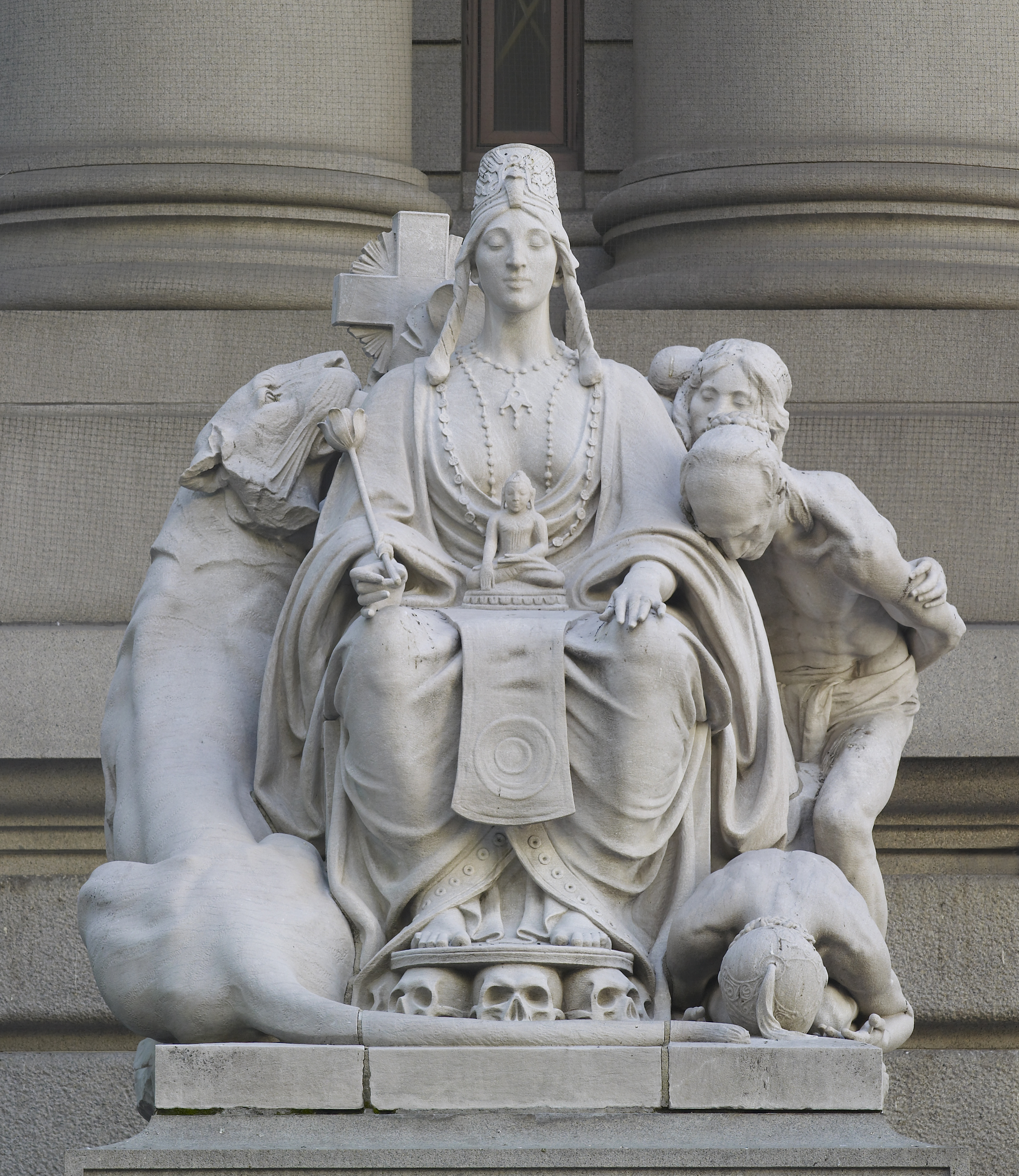
Asia

America

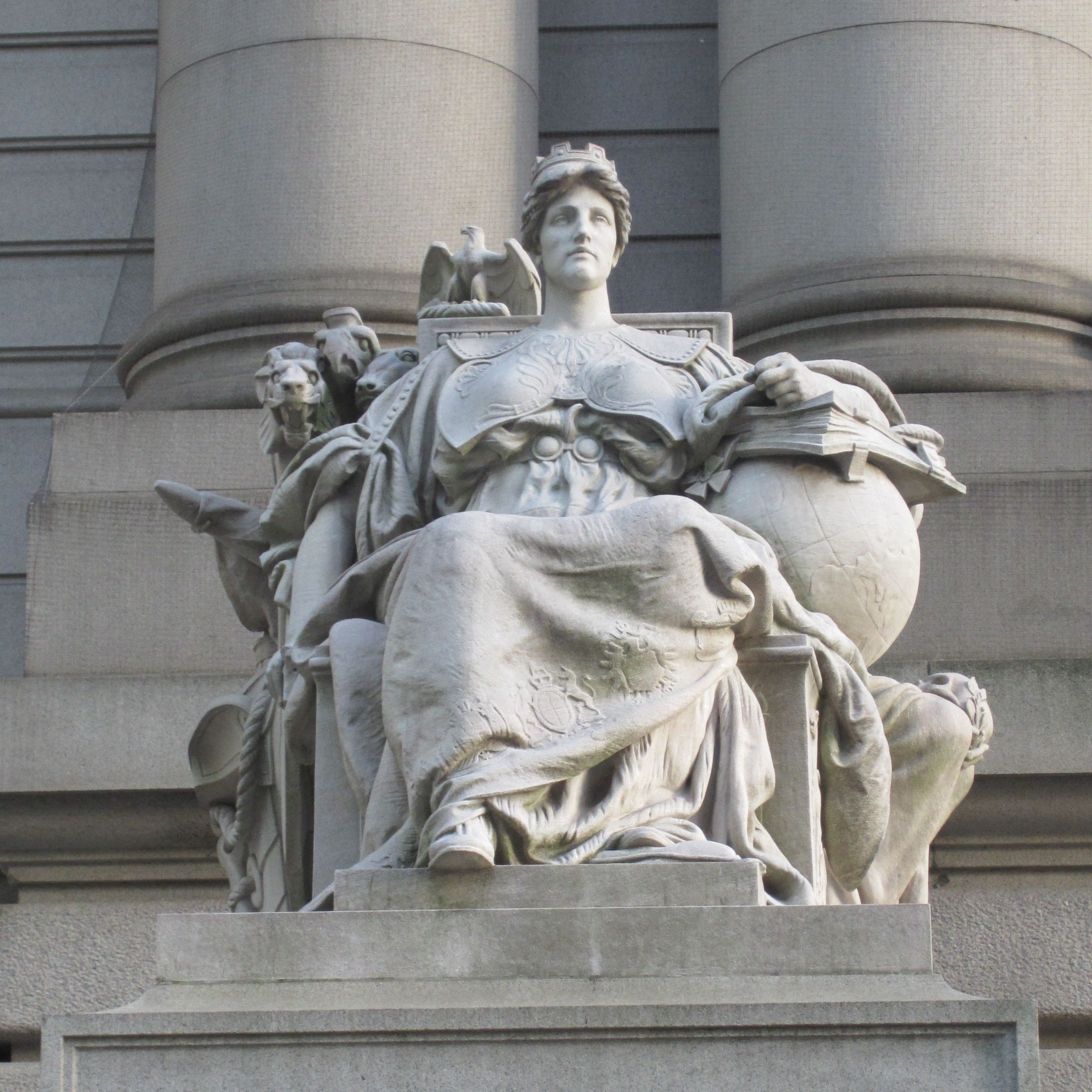
Europe

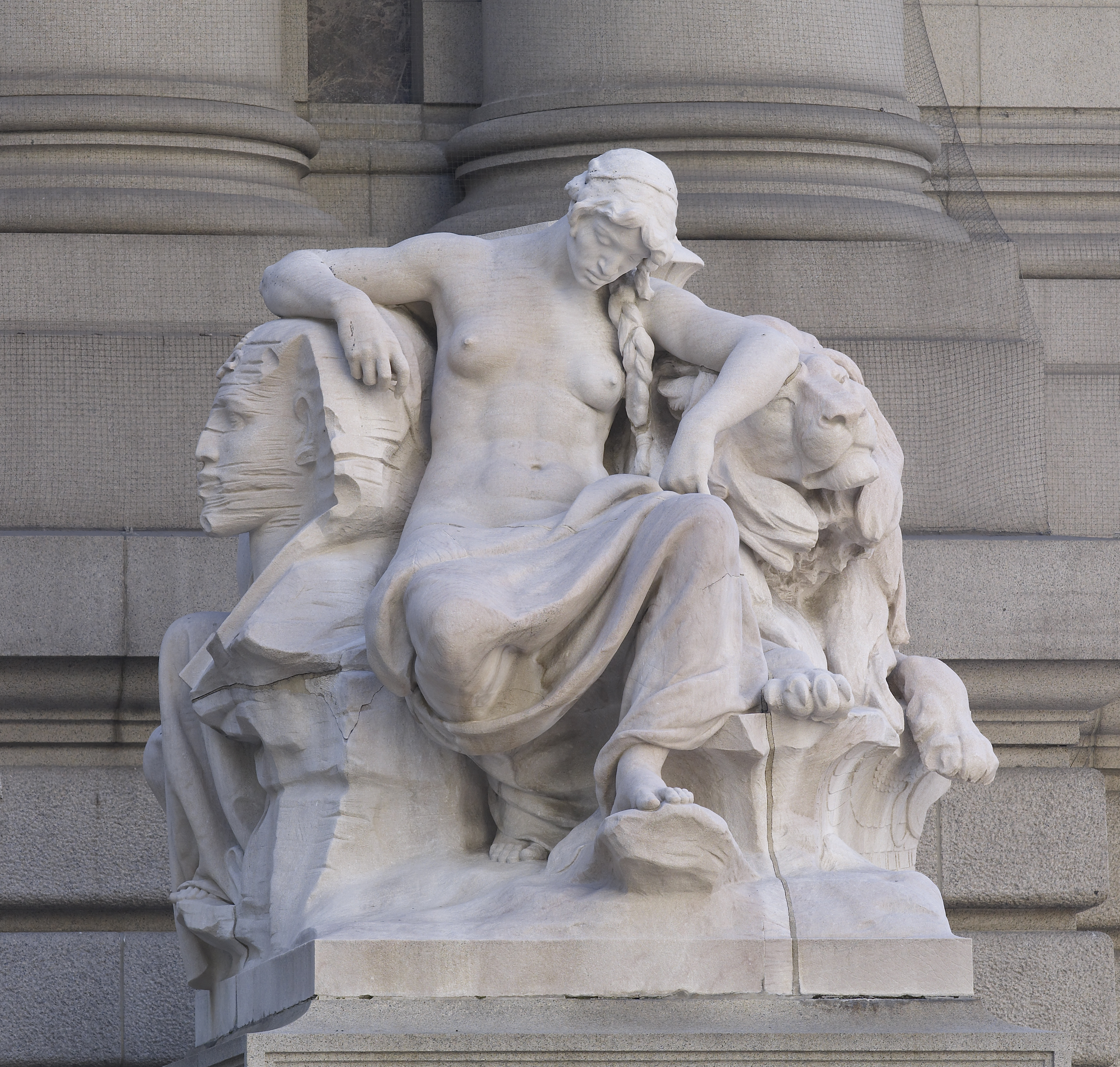
Africa

Twelve sculptors were hired to create the figural groups on the exterior. The major work flanking the front steps, the Four Continents, was contracted to Daniel Chester French, who designed the sculptures with associate Adolph A. Weinman. French received the commission for all four sculptures after Augustus Saint-Gaudens declined an invitation to design two of the statues. The work was made of marble and sculpted by the Piccirilli Brothers; each sculptural group cost $13,500. (Note: Equivalent to $340,084 in 2025) The sculptures were produced at the Piccirilli Brothers' studio in the Bronx. From east to west, the statues depict larger-than-life-size personifications of Asia, America, Europe, and Africa. The primary figure of each group is a woman and is flanked by smaller human figures. In addition, Asia's figure is paired with a tiger, and Africa's figure is paired with a lion.

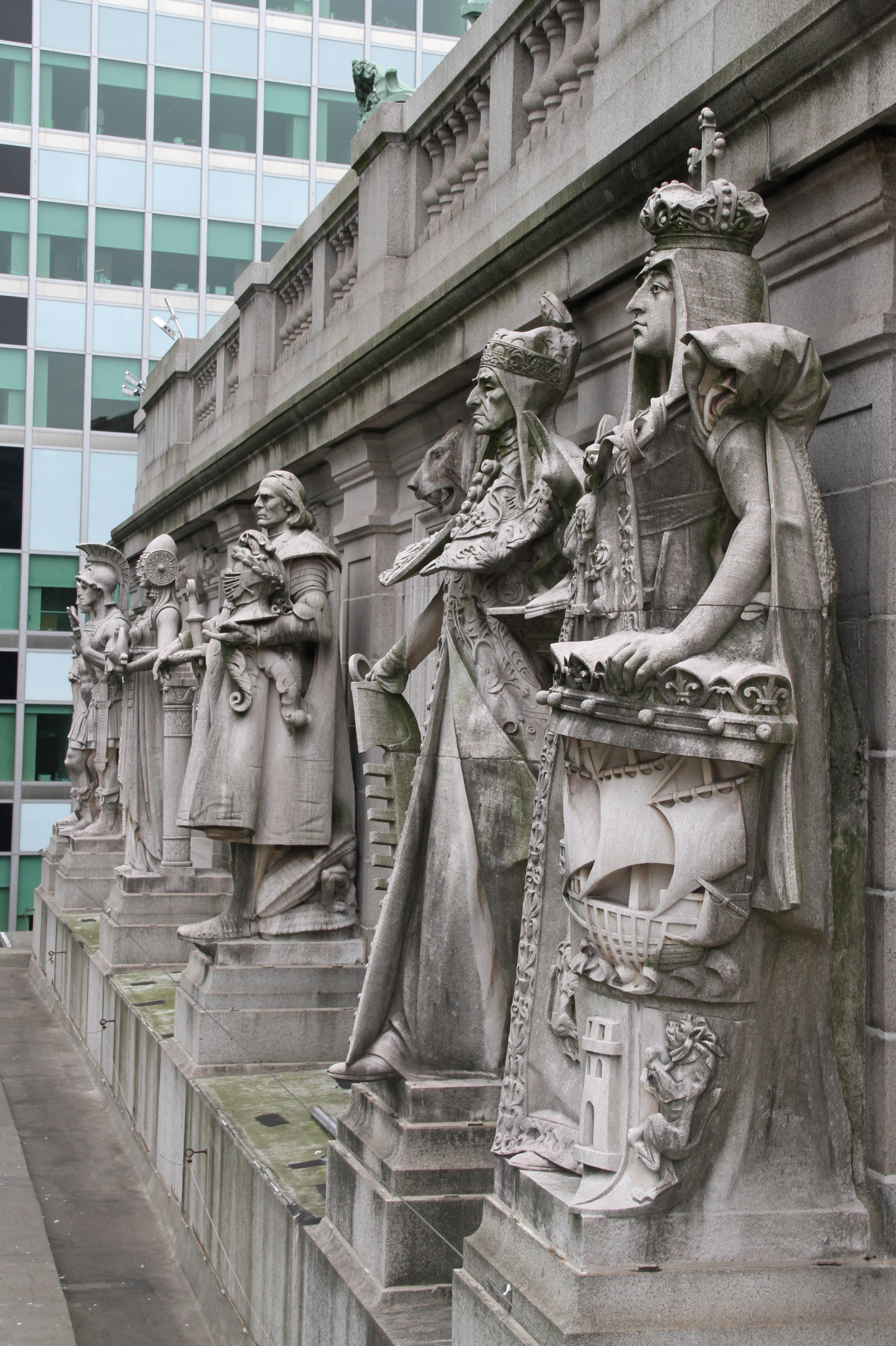
Sculptures of seafaring nations

The capitals of each of the 44 columns are decorated with carved heads depicting Hermes, the Greek god of commerce. The windows on the main facade are topped by eight keystones, which contain carved heads with depictions of eight human races. One source described the keystones as representing "Caucasian, Hindu, Latin, Celt and Mongol, Italian, African, Eskimo, and even the Coureur de Bois".

Above the main cornice are a group of standing sculptures that personify seafaring nations. There are twelve such statues, which depict commercial hubs through both ancient and modern history. Each sculpture is 11 feet (3.4 m) tall and weighs 20 short tons (18 metric tons). These sculptures are arranged in chronological sequence from east to west, or from left to right as seen from directly in front of the building. The easternmost sculptures are of ancient Greece and Rome, while the westernmost sculptures are of the more recent French and British empires. Eight sculptors were commissioned for this work. One of these sculptures, Germania by Albert Jaegers, was modified in 1918 to display Belgian insignia rather than German insignia. Bitter created a cartouche of the United States' coat of arms for the roof.

=== Interior ===
A barrel-vaulted entrance vestibule, supported by marble columns and decorated with multicolored mosaics, is just inside the entrance. Behind bronze gates is a passageway to the Great Hall. At the center of the building is a double-height rotunda, rising to the third story. On and above the third story, the building is arranged as a hollow quadrilateral, surrounding the rotunda. This creates a light court above the rotunda, which measures 80 feet (24 m) wide on its north end, 120 feet (37 m) wide on its south end, and 200 feet (61 m) deep.

Stairways, made of marble with iron handrails, connect the interior spaces. There are elevators in each corner; the southwestern and southeastern banks contain two elevators each, while the northwestern and northeastern banks have three elevators apiece. The northwestern and northeastern elevators were originally open cages but were replaced with enclosed cabs in 1935. Because the original appropriation was limited in scope, decorative elements in the initial construction were limited to several important rooms, including the rotundas, hallways, lobby, and collector's office. The walls of these spaces are clad with marble in multiple hues, and there are nautical motifs in numerous locations.

==== Second floor ====
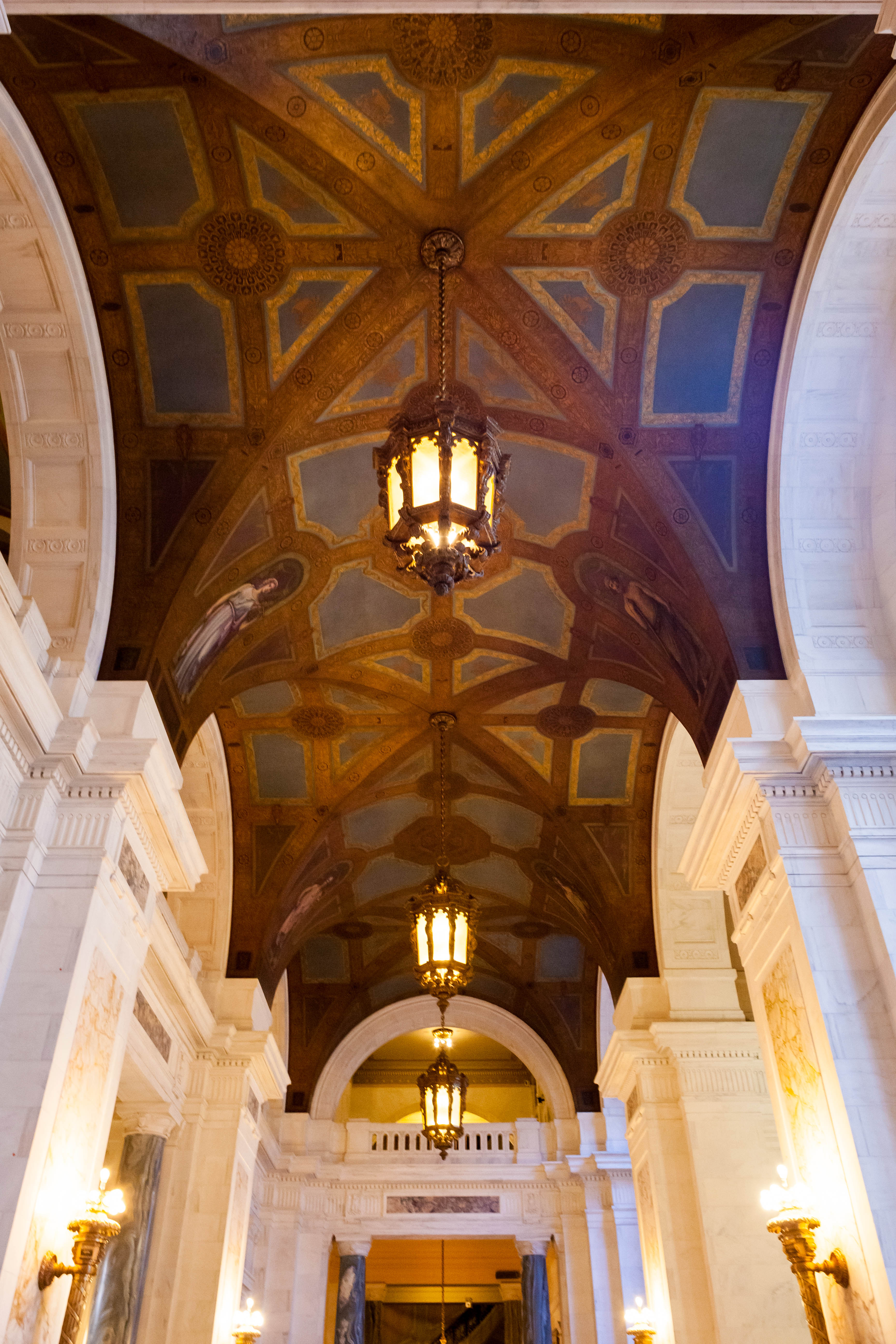
The transverse lobby runs from east to west along the second floor.

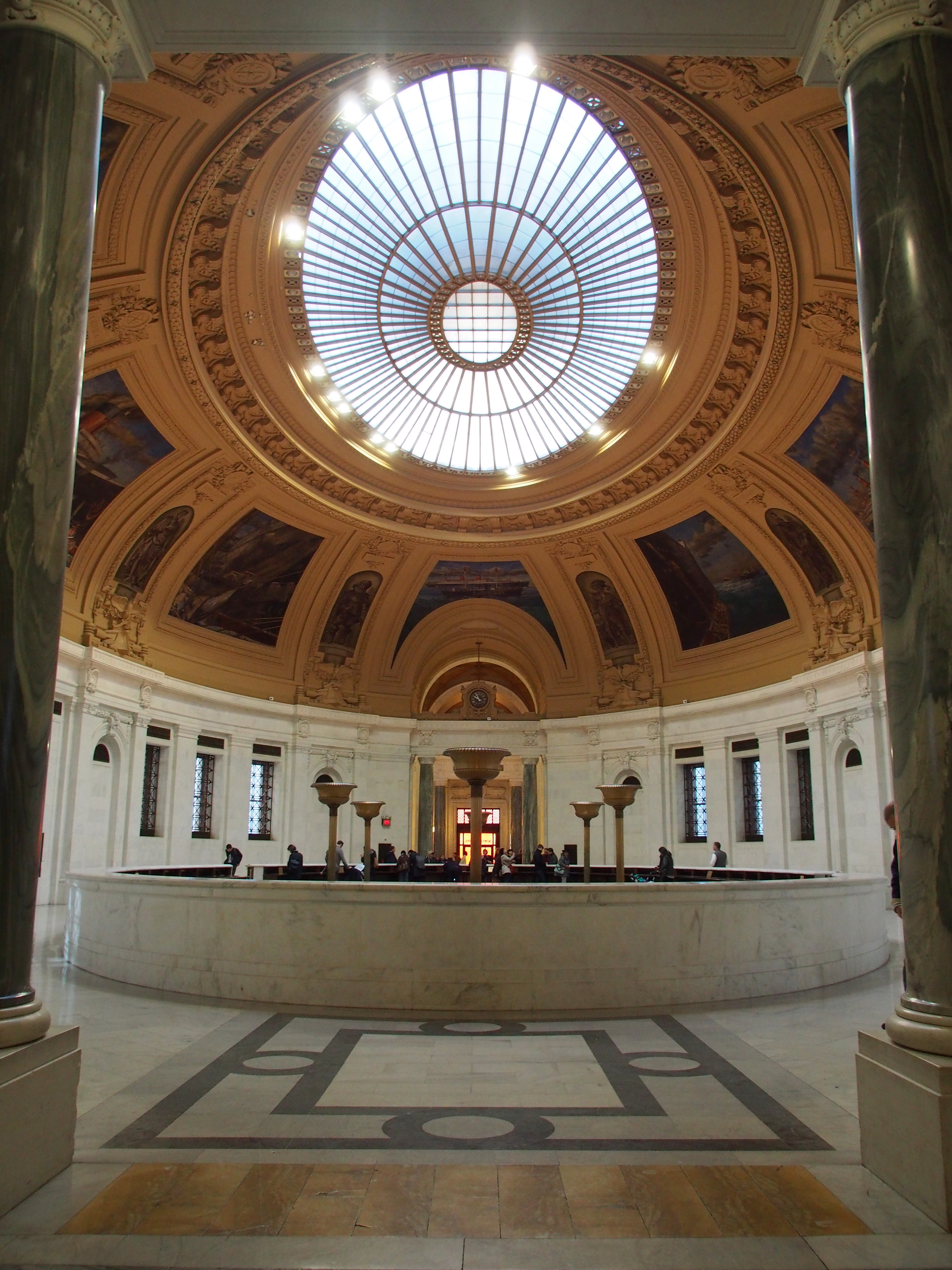
The rotunda connects the lobby with the exhibition galleries of the Heye Center.

The second-floor ceiling is generally 23 feet (7.0 m) tall. This floor consists of the former office spaces in the front and rear, the transverse lobby, and the rotunda. Gilbert planned the Custom House's interior so "all entrances, corridors, stairways and passages [were] arranged on the most direct and simple axial lines". The second-floor space, including the former offices, is almost entirely occupied by the Heye Center of the National Museum of the American Indian.

===== Transverse lobby =====
The transverse lobby spans the northern end of the second floor from west to east. Generally, the more important offices were positioned north of the lobby, while divisions dealing in more routine work were relegated to the south. Following the conversion of the second floor into the Heye Center, the former back offices have been occupied by various exhibition galleries; the cashier's office houses the museum store; and a café occupies the Northwest office adjacent to the main entrance.

Membrane arches divide the lobby into five bays. The floors are decorated in marble mosaic patterns. An entablature runs around the top of the lobby, with galleries on the third story. There are two doorways on the walls, each topped by carved architraves with nautical symbols. The doors from the lobby to the former offices are made of varnished oak and stippled glass. At the center of the lobby is a three-bay-wide foyer with a pair of round arches to the north and south, which are supplemented by green Doric-style marble columns with white capitals. The bays of the foyer are separated by marble piers. Three bronze lanterns are suspended from the vaulted ceiling, hanging above a red-marble disc on the floor. Elmer E. Garnsey designed murals for the ceiling.

Semicircular staircases, with bronze railings and marble stair treads, flank the lobby. The stairs do not have any metal support structures and are composed entirely of flat, hard-burned clay tiles. Under each stair are timbrel vaults, which connect each landing. The stairs rise to the seventh floor, which contains a skylight that is meant to evoke the design of a ship's cabin. Only the western stair between the first and second floors is open to the public. The elevator doors in the lobby are topped by bronze transom grilles that depict a caravel or sailing ship. There are two additional stairs at the rear, or southern, end of the building.

===== Offices =====
The collector's office

The collector's office is at the northwestern corner of the second floor. The office contains elaborate hardwood floors and oak wainscoting designed by Tiffany Studios; the wainscoting measures 10 feet (3.0 m) high. Garnsey painted ten oil paintings, which are installed above the wainscoting. Each painting has a gold frame and depicts a Dutch or English port in the New World. The office also included a stone fireplace mantel with a plaque referencing Fort Amsterdam and the Government House. The coffered plaster ceiling has molded decorations, including a motif of the collector's monogram. Fourteen lighting fixtures, covered in gold leaf, hang from the ceiling. The room is normally closed to the public but can be rented for events.

The manager's office is next to the collector's office and is decorated with plain plaster walls, topped by a cornice in the Ionic order. The northeastern corner housed the cashier's office, which featured a white-marble countertop with a bronze screen. The southern half of the cashier's room has white-marble walls and was originally where members of the public conducted their transactions. The northern half, where the cashiers themselves worked, has plaster walls. The ornate plasterwork ceiling is decorated to resemble Renaissance "boxed beams", while the marble floor has a geometric border. The former cashier's office has been incorporated into the Heye Center's museum store.

==== Rotunda ====
The elliptical rotunda, within the building's interior courtyard, measures 85 by 135 feet (26 by 41 m) and rises to the third story. The rotunda can be rented for special events. When the Heye Center opened within the building in 1994, it built several permanent galleries around the rotunda. The walls and floors are composed of geometric marble tiles in several hues.

The ceiling is self-supporting, without any interior metal structure; it uses the Guastavino tile arch system created by Spanish architect Rafael Guastavino. It consists of numerous layers of fireproof tiles, (Note: The lower sections of the rotunda's ceiling are made of nine layers of tiles, while the upper sections are composed of three layers. These are arranged as two "shells" with a space between them.) each of which measures 6 by 12 inches (15 cm × 30 cm) across and 1 inch (2.5 cm) thick. The tiles and layers are bonded using Portland cement. The center of the ceiling is occupied by a 140-short-ton (130-metric-ton) oval skylight. The underside of the ceiling bears eight trapezoidal panels, as well as eight long, narrow panels between them. The panels contain fresco-secco murals, which were painted in 1937 by Reginald Marsh and eight assistants as part of the Treasury Relief Art Project. (Note: The assistants were Xavier J. Barile, Lloyd Lozes Goff, Mary Fife Laning, Ludwig Mactarian, Oliver M. Baker, John Poehler, J. Walkely, and E. Volsung.) The larger murals portray shipping activity in the Port of New York and New Jersey, while the smaller murals depict notable explorers of the New World and the Port of New York. Several shipping companies bought lunch for Marsh while he was painting the murals; as such, the murals depict these companies' ships.

Rotunda murals

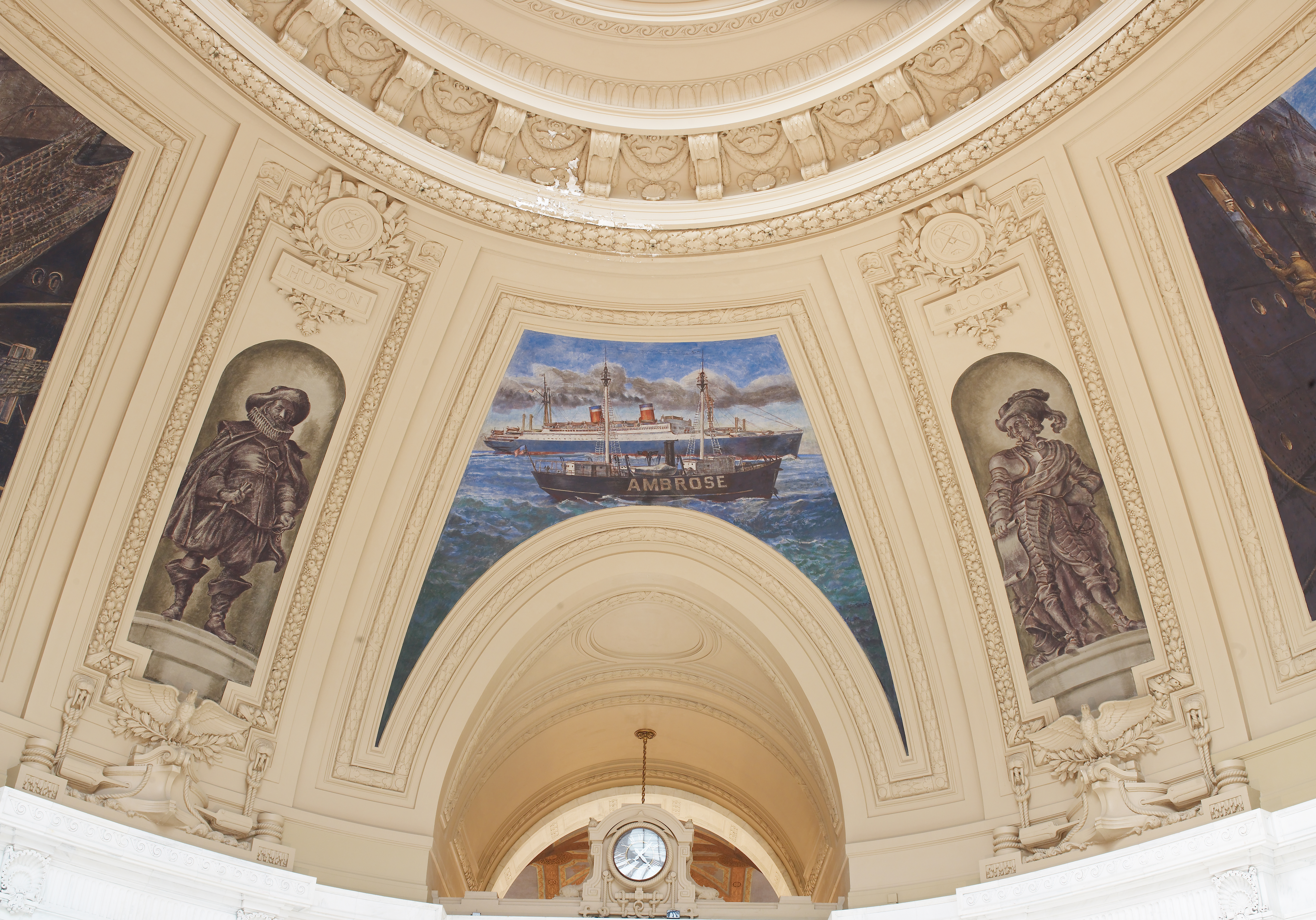
From left: Explorer Hudson, SS Washington Passing Ambrose Lightship, Explorer Block

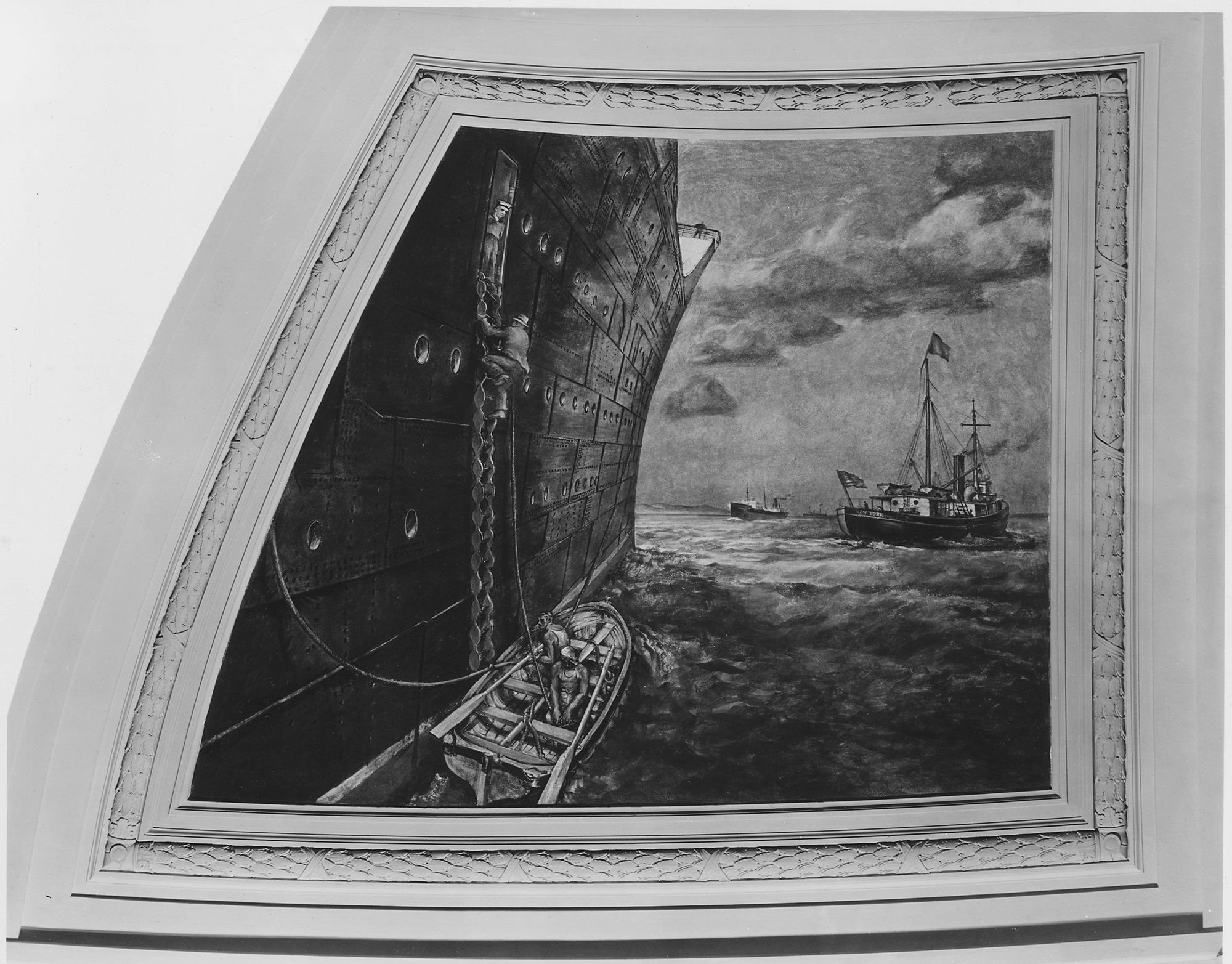
Picking Up the Pilot

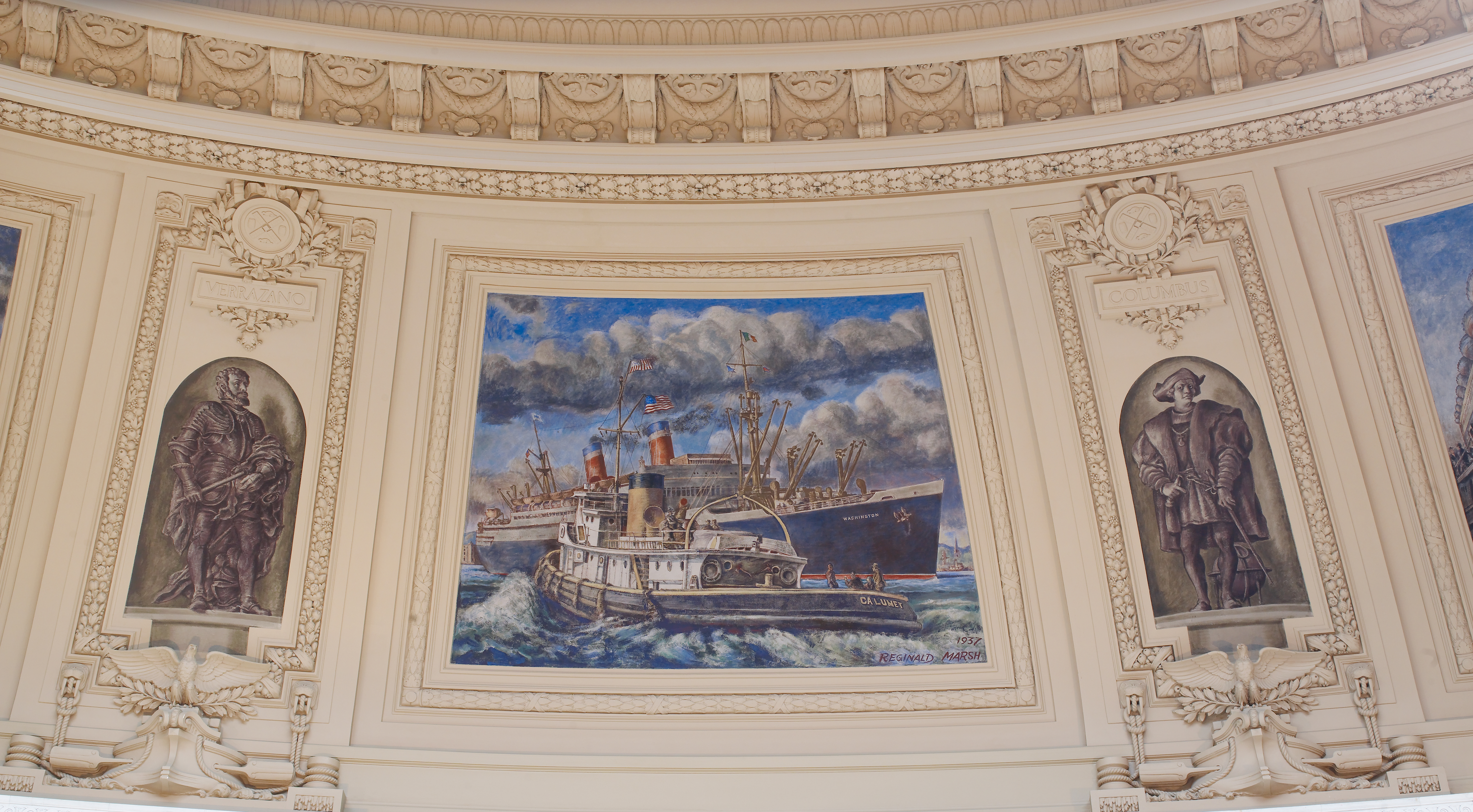
From left: Explorer Verrazano, Coast Guard Cutter Calumet Meeting the SS Washington, Explorer Columbus

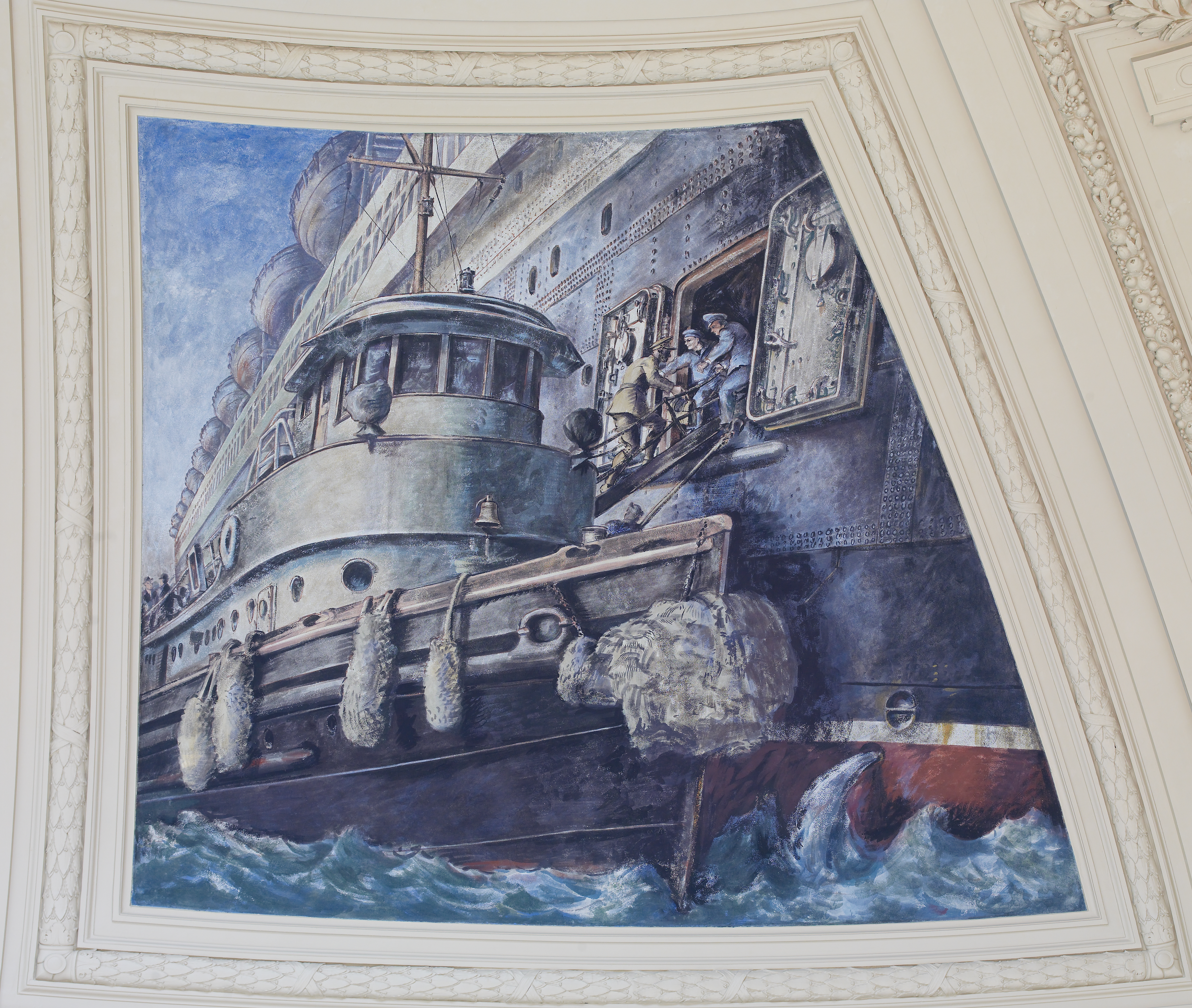
Customs Officials Boarding Liner

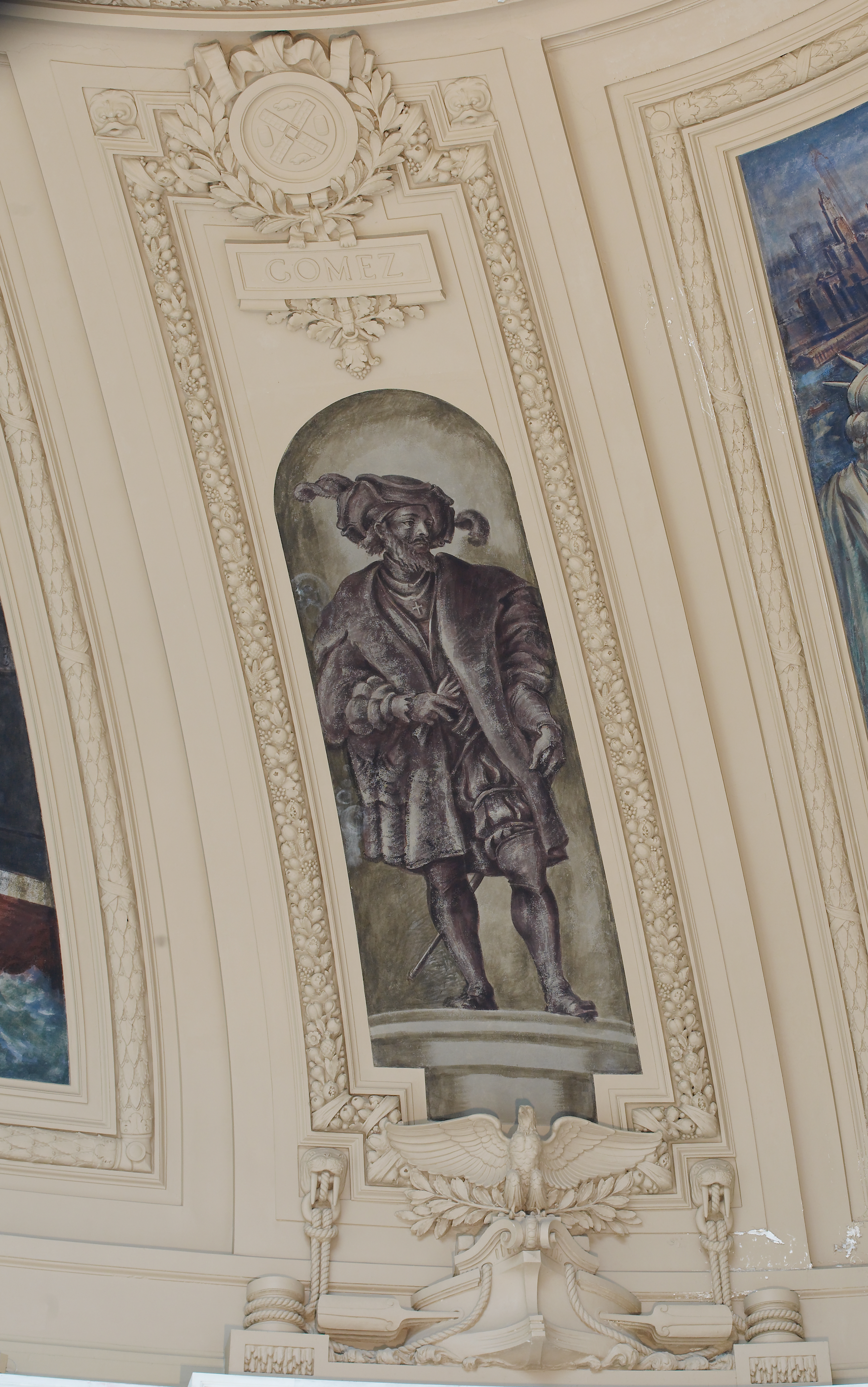
Explorer Gomez

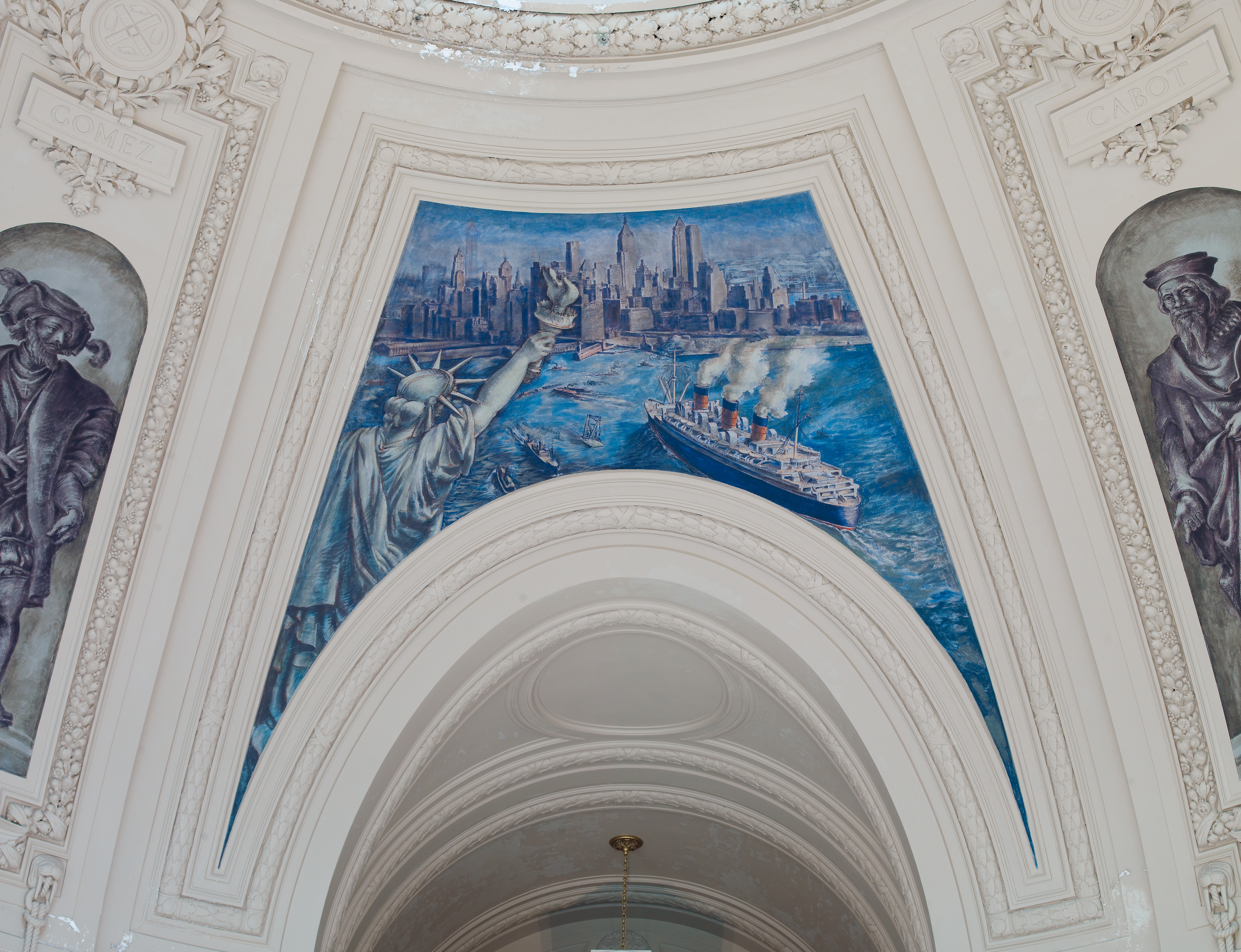
Passing the Statue of Liberty

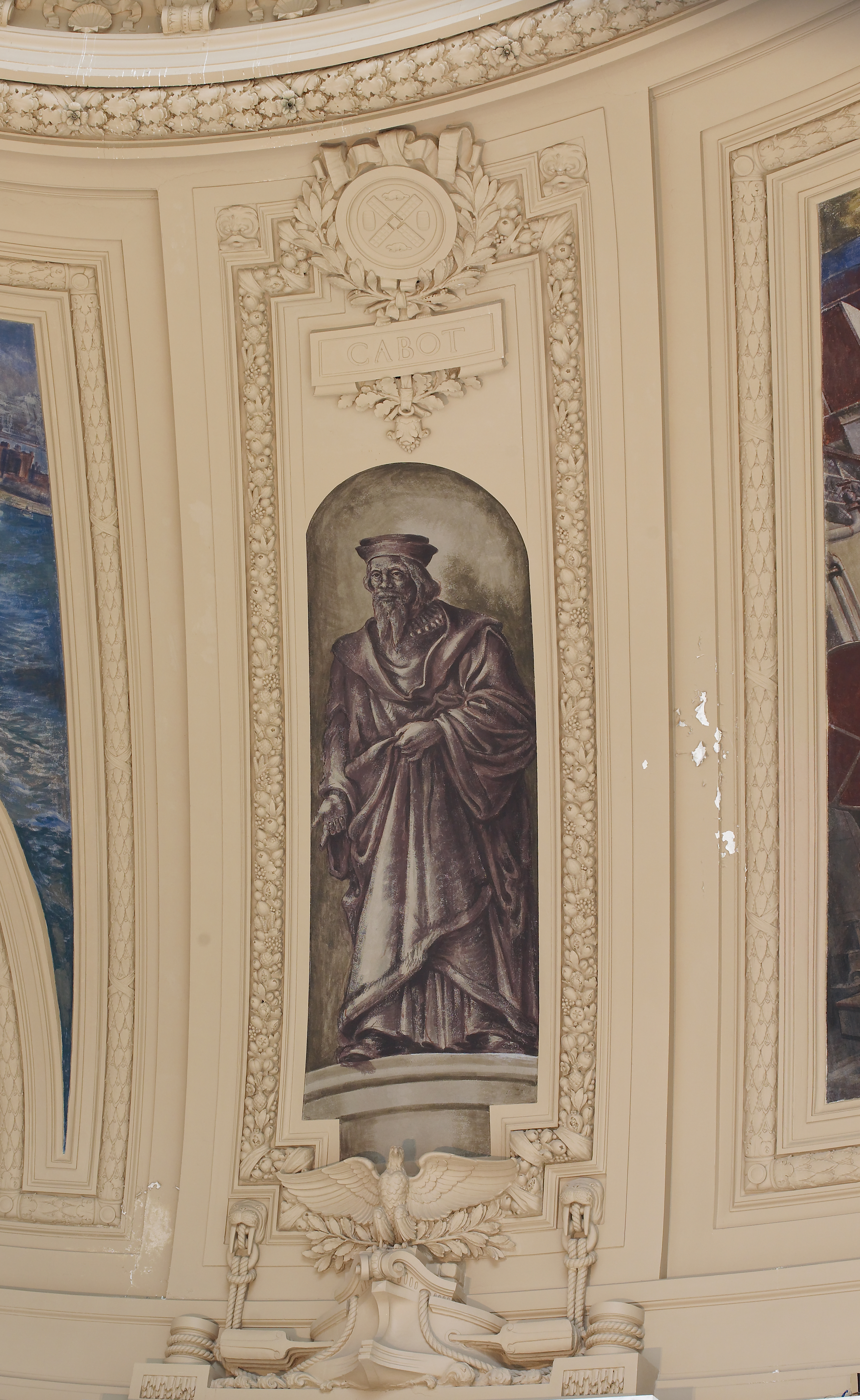
Explorer Cabot

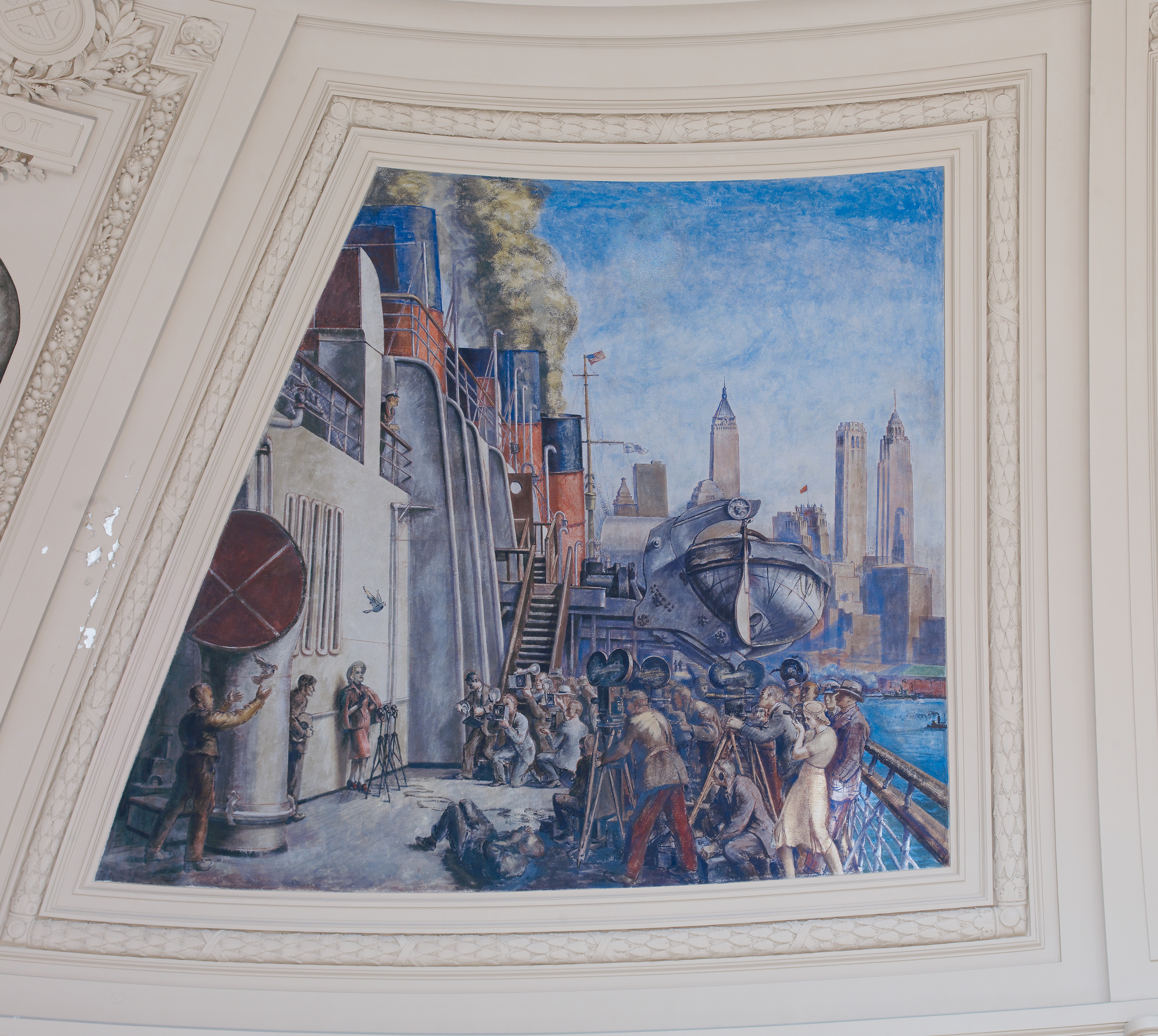
The Press Interviewing a Celebrity

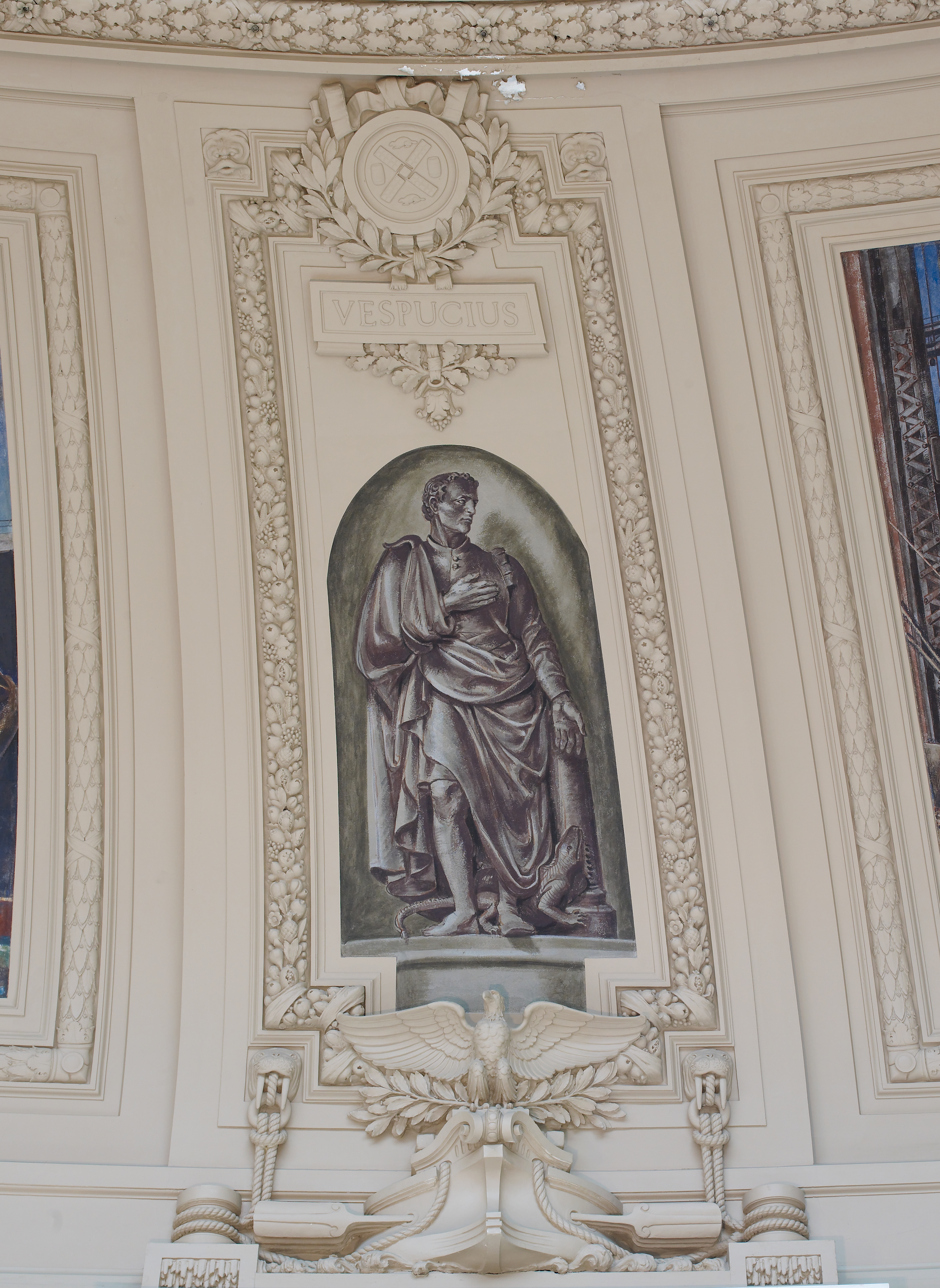
Explorer Vespucius

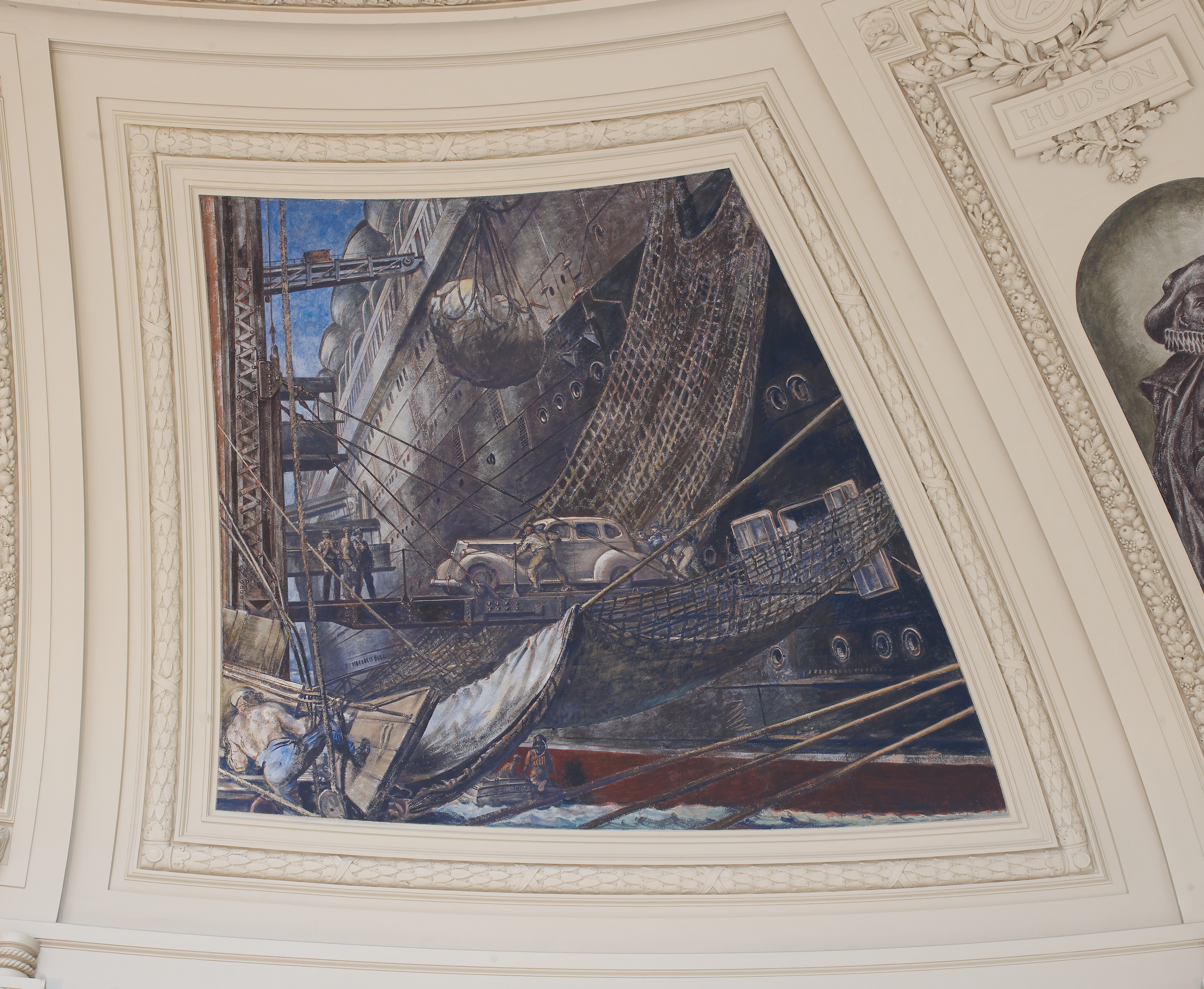
Unloading Cargo

==== Other stories ====
The ground story is 20 feet (6.1 m) tall. It originally had six entrances: two on the front and two each on State and Whitehall Streets. The Bowling Green post office, operated by the United States Postal Service, was formerly near the building's south end. The post office was located around a west–east corridor accessed by both State and Whitehall Streets. There are also two ramps for delivery vehicles. The floor surface, wainscoting, and pilasters are made of marble, and the ceilings are 17 feet (5.2 m) high. In the early 1990s, a 350-seat auditorium was built on the ground story. About 6,000 square feet (560 m^{2}) of storage space on the ground floor, under the rotunda, was converted into the George Gustav Heye Center's Diker Pavilion for Native Arts and Cultures in 2006. This pavilion consists of a slightly sloped circular space seating 400 people, surrounding a maple dance floor.

The Custom House's trapezoidal site was excavated to an average depth of 25 feet (7.6 m). Two stories are placed beneath the ground level. The first basement is just above sea level and has a 13-foot-high (4.0 m) ceiling, while the second basement has a waterproof asphalt-and-tar floor. When the post office was in operation, mail arrived through the delivery docks and was sorted in the basement.

The upper stories contain office space. The outer portion of the fifth story was initially used for document storage; the windows are small apertures within the entablature, making that story unsuitable for office use. The ceilings of the upper stories are between 12 and 16 feet (3.7 and 4.9 m) tall. Some of the offices on the upper stories were ornately decorated. In particular, the Naval Commander of the Port's office at the northwest corner of the third floor was decorated in dark oak. The Treasury Secretary's office at the northeast corner of the seventh floor was finished in quartered oak and contained Circassian-walnut furniture.

== History ==
The United States Customs Service had been formed in 1789 with the passage of the Tariff Act, which authorized the collection of duties on imported goods. The Port of New York was the primary port of entry for goods reaching the United States in the 19th century and, as such, the New York Custom House was the country's most profitable custom house. Import taxes were a major revenue stream for the federal government before a national income tax was implemented in 1913 with the passage of the 16th Amendment. The New York Custom House had supplied two-thirds of the federal government's revenue at one point. Because the salary of the collector was tied to the custom house's revenue, the New York Custom House's collector earned more than the U.S. president, and the position was extremely powerful.

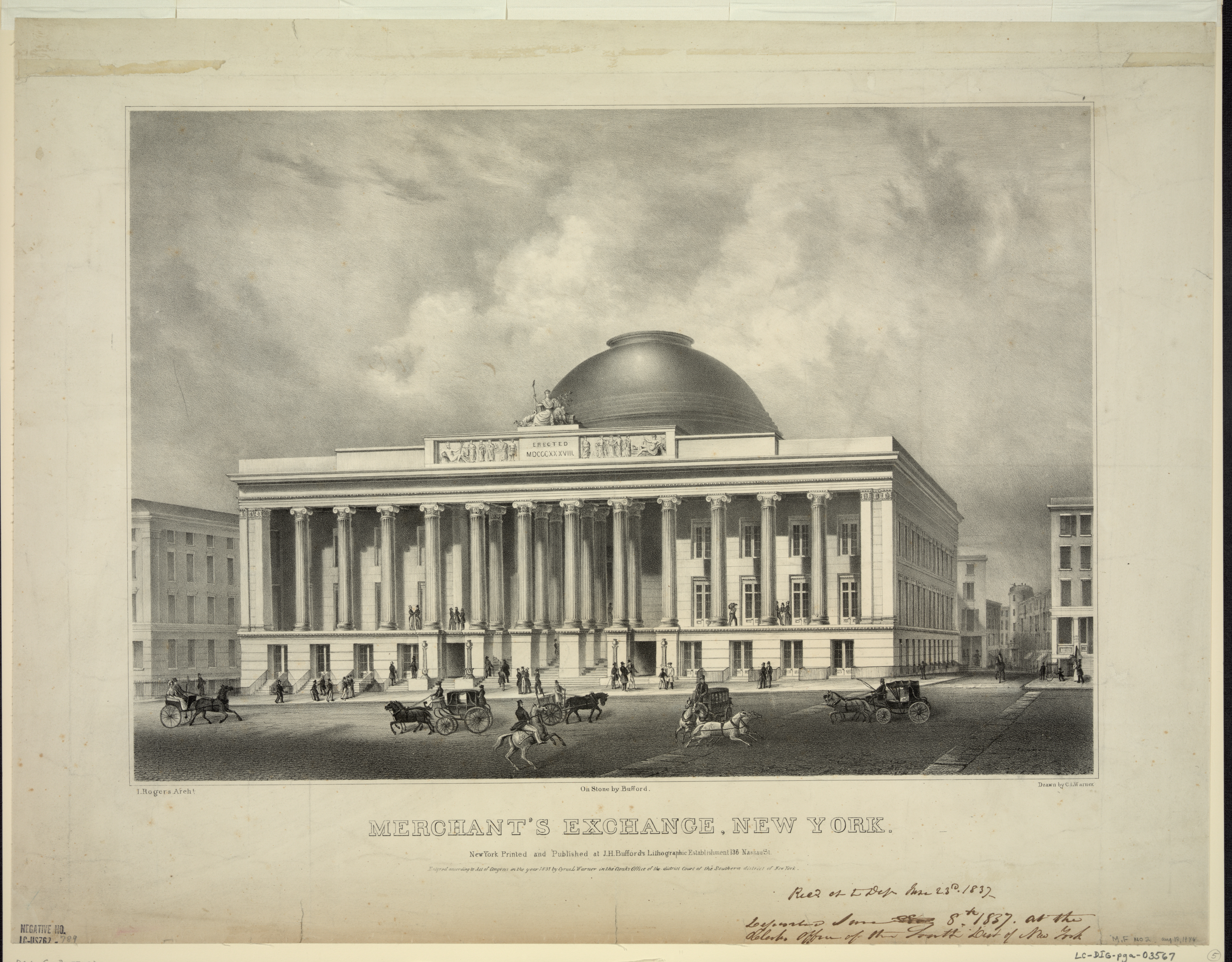
The Merchants' Exchange Building served as New York City's custom house before the Alexander Hamilton Custom House was built.

The New York Custom House had occupied several sites in Lower Manhattan before the Alexander Hamilton Custom House was built. The first such house was established in 1790 at South William Street. The custom house moved to the Government House on the site of Fort Amsterdam in 1799. The customs service relocated numerous times in the 19th century before opening an office at 55 Wall Street in 1862. The Wall Street location had been optimal during the mid-19th century because it was close to the Subtreasury at 26 Wall Street, thereby making it easy to transport gold.

=== Planning and construction ===
The Custom House on Wall Street had become overcrowded by 1887. William J. Fryer Jr., superintendent of repairs of New York City's federal-government buildings, wrote to the United States Department of the Treasury's Supervising Architect in February 1888 about the "old, damp, ill-lighted, badly ventilated" quarters at 55 Wall Street. Architecture and Building magazine called the letter "worthy of thoughtful investigation". The 55 Wall Street building's proximity to the Subtreasury was no longer advantageous, as it was easier to use a check or certificate to make payments on revenue. On September 14, 1888, the United States Congress passed an act that would allow site selection for a new custom house and appraiser's warehouse. Soon after, Fryer presented his report to the New York State Chamber of Commerce. The Chamber said in 1889: "We have not seriously considered the removal of the present Custom House proper, since it is well located, and, if found inadequate, can easily be easily be enlarged to meet all the wants of the Government for an indefinite time to come."

==== Site selection ====
Fryer recommended Bowling Green as his first preference for a new custom house, followed by a site immediately south, along State Street north of Battery Park. The U.S. House and Senate both passed a bill in March 1889, appropriating $750,000 (Note: Equivalent to $24,305,276 in 2025) for a new custom house in the vicinity of Bowling Green. One supporter of the Bowling Green site implied that it had been left that way "in order that New York might have a public building worthy of the city and the nation". That September, Treasury secretary William Windom selected Bowling Green as the new site of the custom house and appraiser's warehouse. Almost immediately, Windom was accused of exceeding his authority in selecting the new site. In addition, many local businessmen opposed moving the custom house, and a judge ruled in 1891 that the federal government could not take the Bowling Green site by eminent domain as it had proposed to do.

Both houses of the U.S. Congress passed a bill to acquire land for a new custom house in New York City, and to sell the old building, in March 1891. The federal government appointed three commissioners to appraise the cost of acquiring land at Bowling Green; in July 1892, the appraisers estimated that the site would cost $1.96 million. (Note: Equivalent to $63 million in 2025) Still, in January 1893, there was not enough money to purchase the lots at Bowling Green. The lessees and landowners were supposed to receive $2.1 million, (Note: Equivalent to $67 million in 2025) but there was only $1.5 million on hand. (Note: Equivalent to $48 million in 2025) The 1891 bill had allowed up to $2 million for land acquisition and had required that the previous building be sold for at least $4 million. Members of Congress voted against a bill in March 1893 to appropriate an additional $800,000 for the site. Because of a lack of funding, the planned custom house at Bowling Green was abandoned at the end of that month.

The project did not proceed further until January 1897, when bills for the acquisition of the Bowling Green site were introduced in both houses of Congress. Federal legislators proposed further appropriations, but the Treasury retained the disbursements that would have gone to the landowners. The federal government chose an alternate site for the appraiser's warehouse in the West Village of Manhattan, near where much of the city's international shipping activity took place.

==== Site acquisition and architectural competition ====
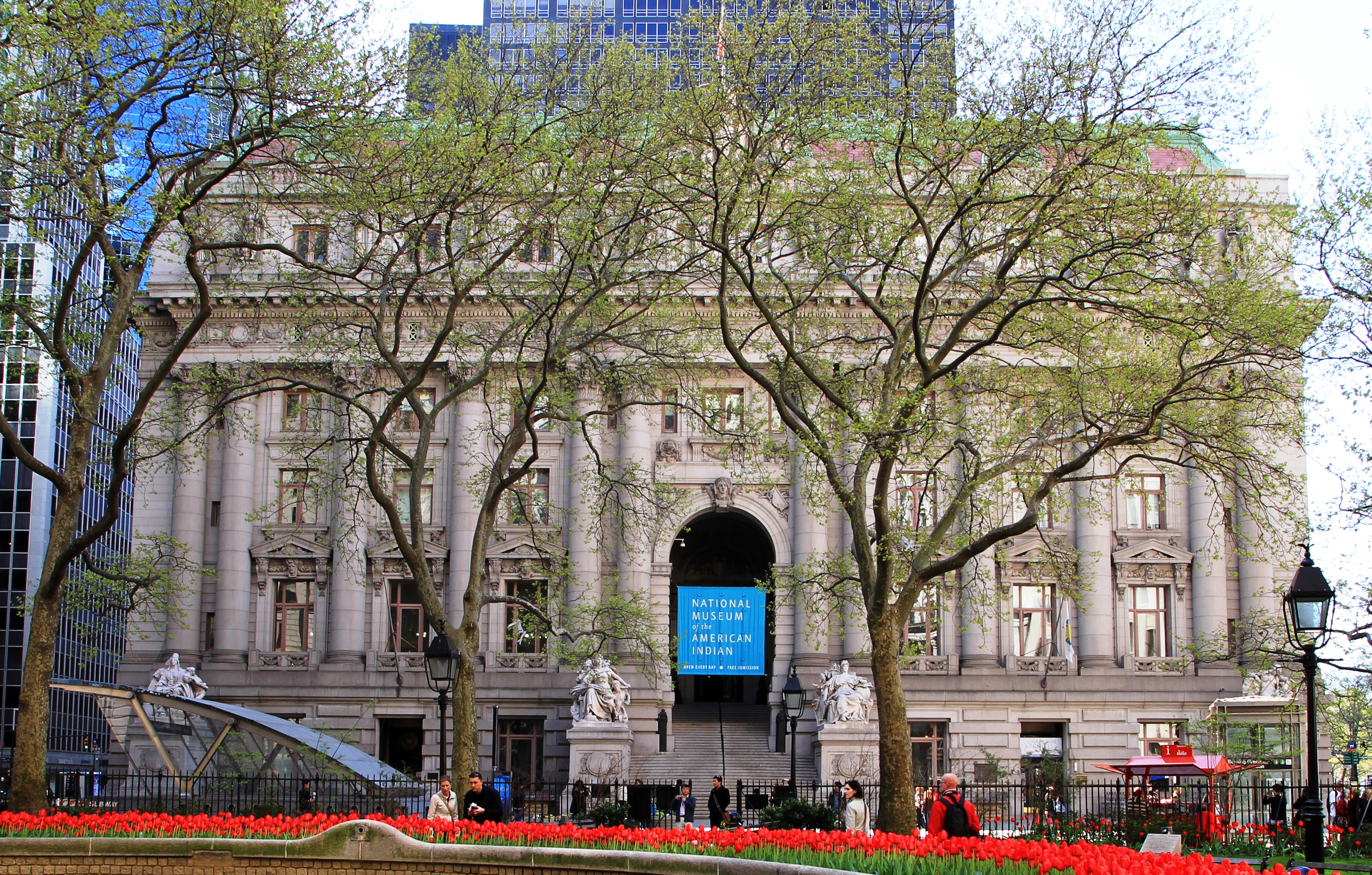
The building seen from Bowling Green

Architectural writer Donald Reynolds stated that the new custom house was to be as modern as possible, with "an architectural style that embodied the tradition of the customs service, the federal government, and the United States with the latest building technology". The Tarsney Act, passed in 1893, permitted the Supervising Architect to host a competition to hire private architects to design federal-government buildings. The act did not take effect until Treasury secretary Lyman J. Gage took office in 1897. Furthermore, it was difficult for the federal government to sell the old building for the required price of $4 million. (Note: Equivalent to $128 million in 2025) The new New York Custom House was only the fourth building to be built under the Tarsney Act.

Republican Party officials wished to have complete control over spending for the new custom house building. Originally, the Chamber of Commerce and many business interests advocated for erecting a new custom house on the Wall Street site, even though it was less than half the size of the proposed Bowling Green site. In 1897, Senator Thomas C. Platt and Representative Lemuel E. Quigg, both Republicans, proposed bills in the United States Senate and House of Representatives for building a new custom house at Wall Street, with Platt's bill calling for a five-person commission to oversee the process. The bills died at the end of the 54th United States Congress in March 1897. During the 55th Congress in February 1898, legislation for the acquisition of the Bowling Green site was again proposed in the U.S. House and Senate, providing $5 million (Note: Equivalent to $165 million in 2025) for land acquisition and construction.

The U.S. House and Senate passed the Bowling Green bills in early 1899. At the time, most of the structures on the site were three-story houses used by steamship offices; by April, agreements had been made with most of the sixteen landowners. The federal government disbursed $2.2 million (Note: Equivalent to $72 million in 2025) to landowners at the Bowling Green site that July. The next month, the old Custom House was sold for $3.21 million. (Note: Equivalent to $105 million in 2025) Twenty firms were invited in May 1899 to submit designs to the competition under the terms of the Tarsney Act; according to The New York Times, the federal government took "great care" in selecting the architects who were to be invited. Federal supervising architect James Knox Taylor stipulated that any plan include a ground-level basement and up to six stories, as well as a southward-facing light court above the third story. A committee of three men, including Taylor, was appointed to look over the submissions.

By September 1899, there were two finalists: architecture firm Carrere & Hastings and architect Cass Gilbert. Carrere & Hastings's design had called for a Beaux-Arts structure with decorative trim, while Gilbert's design included more French Renaissance Revival elements with copious statuary. After a plan for the two finalists to collaborate failed, Taylor picked Gilbert, who had been his partner at the Gilbert & Taylor architecture firm in St. Paul, Minnesota. The selection of Gilbert was controversial, drawing opposition from Platt and several groups. Some of the opposition centered around the fact that Gilbert was a "westerner" who had just moved from Minnesota to New York City, and several opponents raised doubts about the jury's competence. Gage certified Gilbert's selection in November 1899. Opposition to his selection decreased significantly afterward after the American Institute of Architects' New York chapter criticized the controversy as "unseemly".

==== Construction ====
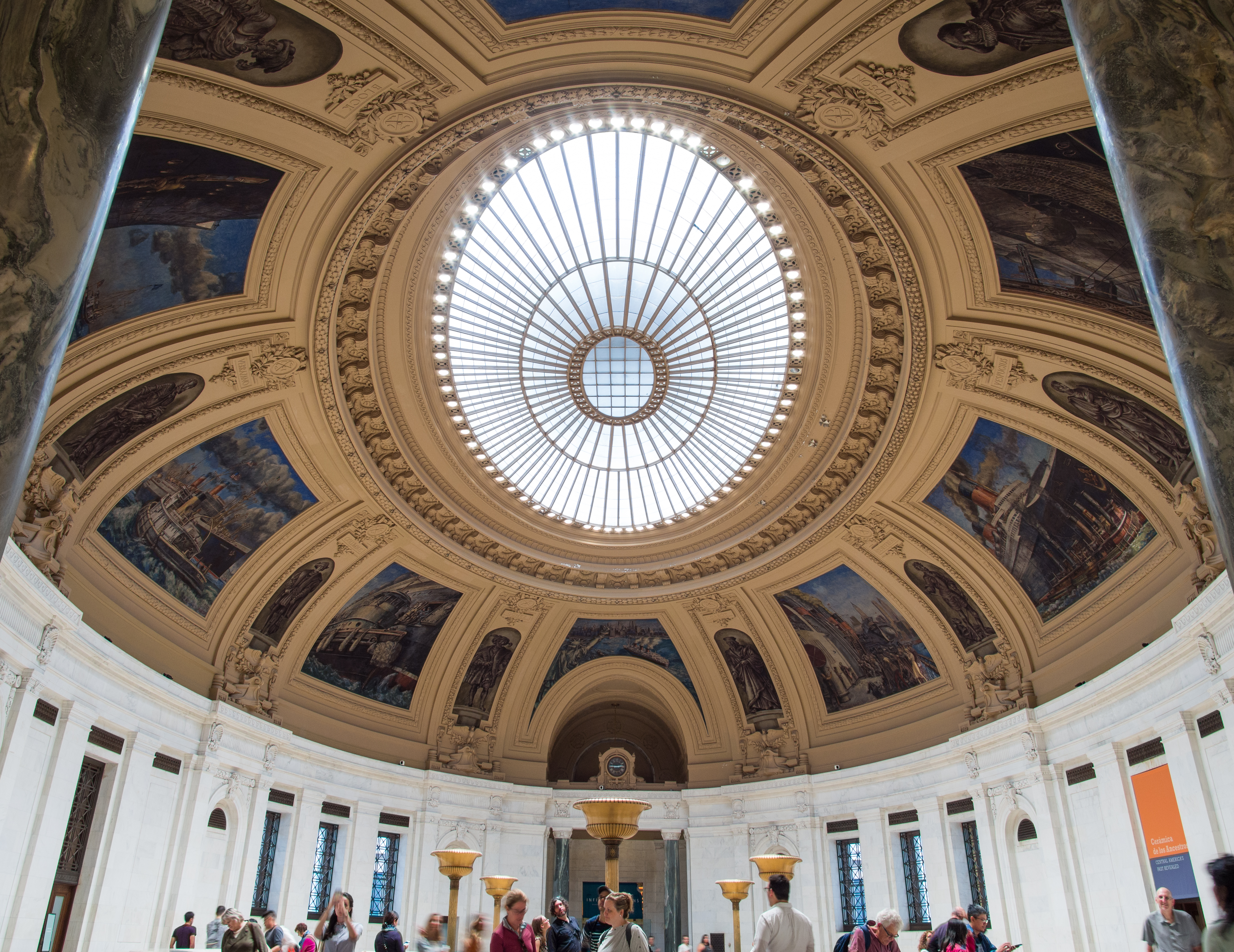
Interior of the rotunda

Demolition of existing buildings on the site began in February 1900, and demolition contractor Seagrist & Co. had cleared the site by that July. The next month, workers drilled test bores for the new Custom House's foundations. Contracts for the building's foundations and structural steel were delayed because the federal government had received several bids, whose estimated completion dates differed significantly. Isaac A. Hopper was contracted to excavate the site that December. The collector of the Port of New York, George R. Bidwell, claimed the contract should have been awarded to the next highest bidder, Charles T. Wills, who like Bidwell was a Republican. The site was excavated to a depth of 25 feet (7.6 m), and some 2.2 million cubic feet (62,000 m^{3}) of dirt was removed. The New-York Tribune called the site "the biggest hole that was ever made in this city over which to erect a building".

The federal government also requested bids for the building's facade. The government was not allowed to request material from a specific quarry, so multiple contractors submitted bids for numerous types of marble, limestone, and granite. In December 1901, the federal government accepted contractor John Peirce's bid to erect the Custom House building's first floor. (Note: Peirce (also spelled Pierce) was previously one of the United States' largest granite contractors. As a general building contractor, he also worked on numerous early skyscrapers, as well as the New York Public Library Main Branch.) Pending further appropriations, the rest of the building would also be built by Peirce. At the time, there was only $3 million budgeted toward the Custom House's completion. (Note: Equivalent to $93 million in 2025) The federal government was required to obtain a congressional appropriation before the project could be completed, so federal officials told Peirce to build only the first story. Peirce was authorized to complete the remaining stories in November 1902, after another $1.5 million (Note: Equivalent to $46 million in 2025) was allocated. Under the terms of the contract, Pierce was to procure Fox Island granite and would be paid $2.2 million. (Note: Equivalent to $68 million in 2025)

The cornerstone of the building was laid on October 7, 1902, in a ceremony attended by Treasury secretary Leslie M. Shaw. After a ticker tape parade down Broadway, the cornerstone, filled with contemporary souvenirs and artifacts, was placed at the northeast corner of the site. The new Custom House's construction lagged due to government bureaucracy, while work on comparable private buildings nearby proceeded more quickly. The slow construction was attributed to various reasons, such as concurrent jobs being undertaken by the building's contractors, money shortages, and lack of supplies. Nonetheless, the building's imminent completion sparked the development of other nearby sites. The Custom House was reportedly 70 percent complete by February 1905, according to Peirce. That September, J. C. Robinson was contracted to furnish the interior of the building, while New-York Steam Fitting was hired to install the mechanical equipment. The facade was finished by the following January.

=== Use by U.S. Customs Service ===
The building's first tenant was a United States Post Office Department station, which opened on the Bridge Street side of the building's ground floor in July 1906. The same year, an additional $465,000 was allocated for the building's completion. (Note: Equivalent to $12 million in 2025) By September 1907, the Custom House was ready to open. The general contractors turned the building over to the federal government on October 1, 1907, after they had completed all major construction. At the time, many of the interior furnishings had not been added, and Congress was reluctant to provide additional funds. The U.S. Customs Service moved its offices to Bowling Green on November 4, 1907. With a proposed final cost of $4.5 million, (Note: Equivalent to $121 million in 2025) it would be more expensive than any other public building in New York City except for the Tweed Courthouse.

==== 1900s to 1930s ====
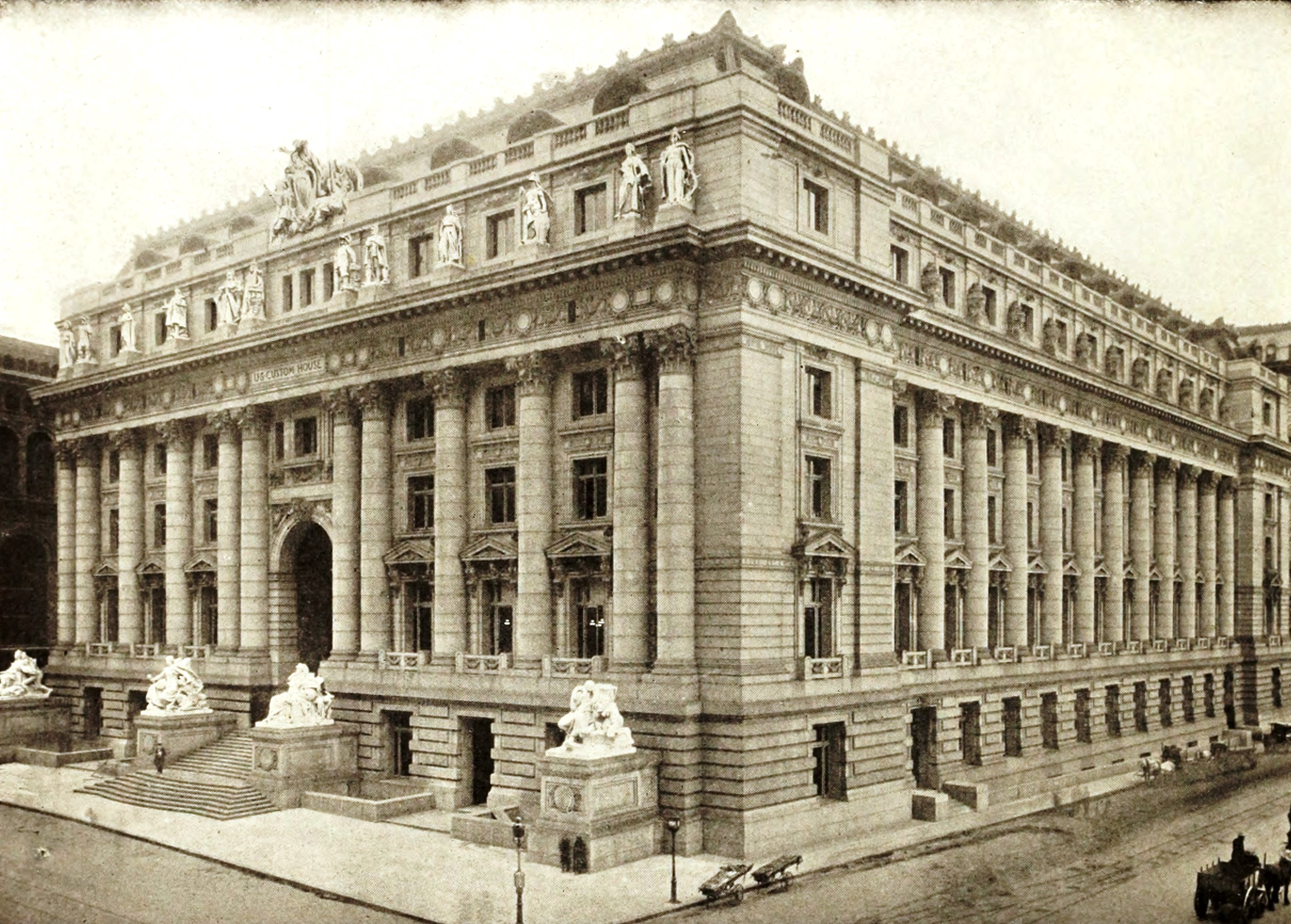
The Custom House in 1912

Following the Customs Service's relocation to the Custom House, other government agencies with offices in New York City, such as the Weather Bureau, also moved to the Bowling Green Custom House. By 1908, the Custom House was fully occupied by these other agencies, as the Treasury's chief architect had assigned space to other departments without consulting with the collector. The next year, the House of Representatives approved the installation of a pneumatic-tube system so the post office and custom house could send packages to the appraiser's warehouse. A bronze tablet, marking the historical site of a Native American gathering place, was dedicated at the Custom House's main entrance in 1909. Another tablet was dedicated at the Custom House in 1912, marking the site of the first mass in New York City, which had taken place in 1683.

The Consular Bureau opened an office at the Custom House in 1910. A regional tax office, where companies and residents in Manhattan south of 23rd Street paid taxes, opened at the Bowling Green Custom House in 1914. Various other agencies such as the Life-Saving Service and Secret Service also had offices in the Custom House. Following the U.S. entry into World War I in 1917, "individuals and patriotic societies" objected to the presence of Germany from the Custom House's sculptures, since Germany was one of the Central Powers against which the United States was fighting. Federal officials determined that it was not feasible to remove the Germania statue, which weighed 5 short tons (4.5 long tons; 4.5 t). Instead, in September 1918, Gilbert was directed to remove the German insignia on the entablature's Germania statue and replace them with Belgian insignia. The U.S. Passport Agency moved to the Custom House building the next year. The U.S. government proposed relocating the Customs Service's administrative offices in 1927 to the Appraiser's Stores Building, but shipping companies spoke out against the move.

A plaque honoring Richard Nicolls, the first colonial governor of the Province of New York, was dedicated at the Custom House in 1931. Large amounts of dirt had accumulated on the facade over the years, and workers steam-cleaned the facade and refurbished the interior in 1934. During the Great Depression, in April 1937, collector Harry M. Durning commissioned Reginald Marsh to paint murals in the main rotunda as part of the Treasury Relief Art Project, with funds and assistance from the Works Progress Administration (WPA). Marsh accepted the commission for $1,560, (Note: Equivalent to $34,937 in 2025) less than five percent of what he would have normally charged. The ceiling of the rotunda had been undecorated white plaster when the building was erected. The installation of the murals was delayed for several months because of what Marsh described as red tape; the murals were completed by February 1938. The Bureau of Foreign and Domestic Commerce also relocated from the building in late 1937.

==== 1940s to early 1970s ====
U.S. president Franklin D. Roosevelt requested in May 1939 that Congress appropriate $190,000 to renovate the Custom House. Congress approved the appropriation but later reduced it by $90,000. Durning asked Congress in 1940 to restore the appropriation, saying that "men [were] falling out of ancient chairs, and [...] our valuable records and current papers stacked on desks and improperly filed in decrepit cabinets and bookshelves". At the time, the building had 1,865 employees, of which 847 worked for the Customs Service; according to Durning, the New York Custom House handled half of the United States' customs business. The building also housed the Bureau of Internal Revenue, the U.S. Post Office, the Commerce Department, and eight other agencies of the U.S. government.

The Custom House's regional tax office began serving additional taxpayers in Staten Island and Midtown Manhattan in 1951. The offices of the Taxpayer Assistance Program, which helped residents file their taxes, relocated from the Custom House to Lafayette Street in 1955; the tax office itself relocated to Houston Street the next year. Although the Port of New York remained the United States' busiest port after World War II, it had begun to decline in importance by the 1950s because of several factors. These included increasing cargo-handling and trucking costs; the decline of local railroads; the rapid growth of the southern and southwestern United States and the development of ports in these regions; and the opening of the St. Lawrence Seaway in Canada, which allowed ships to deliver cargo directly to the Upper Midwest.

As early as 1964, the U.S. Customs Service was considering moving to the World Trade Center, which was under construction. The building's other tenants at the time included the United States Coast Guard, whose Third District Search and Rescue Command was headquartered on the sixth floor. As a money-saving measure, in 1965, the Custom House began using a computerized system to record ships' arrivals. The Public Buildings Service, an agency of the federal government, conducted a study of the Custom House in 1967, finding that the building needed at least $8 million in renovations. By the early 1970s, the facade was extremely dirty, and the front steps had been shuttered for several years because of security concerns.

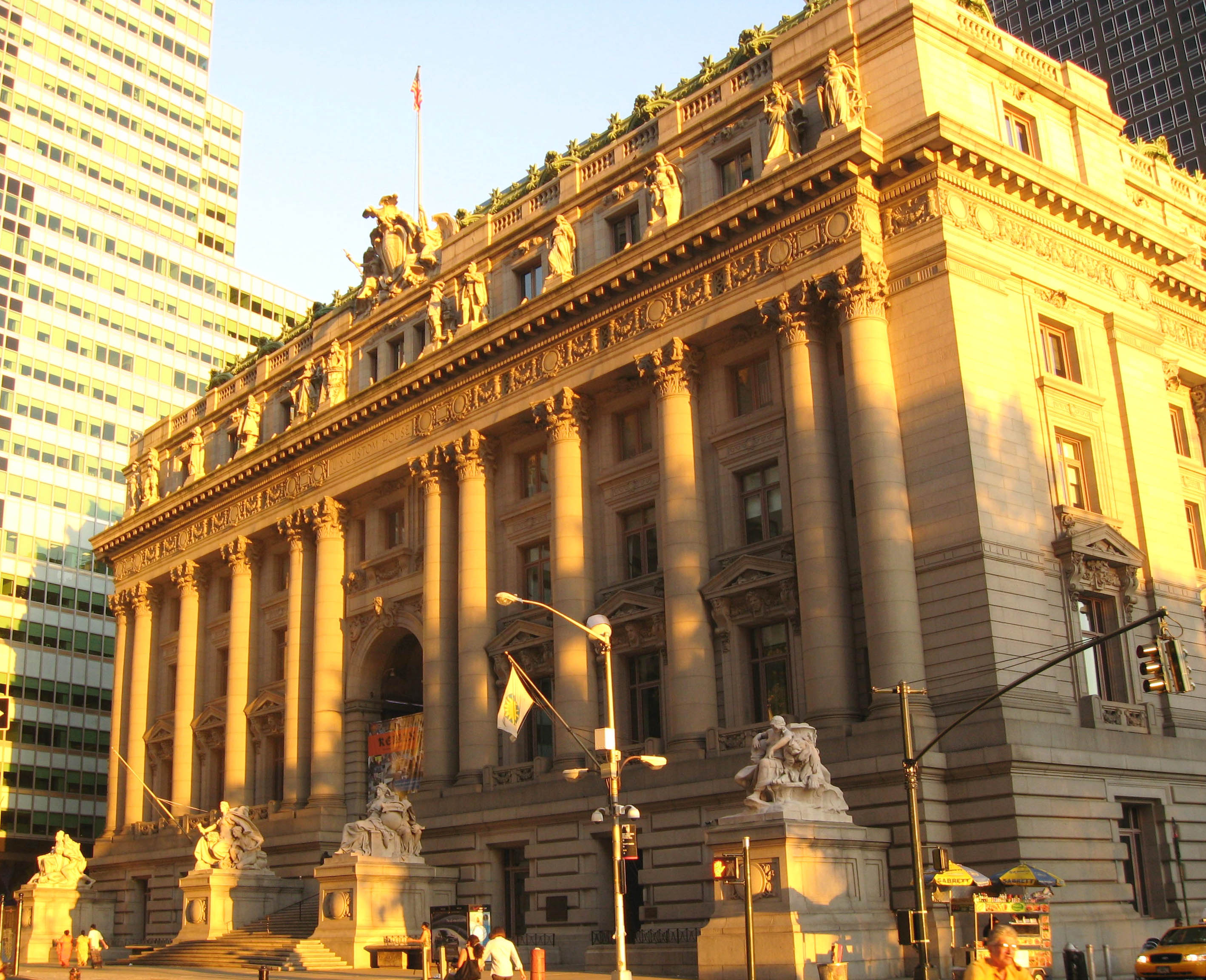
Seen at dusk in 2008

The Customs Service leased space at Six World Trade Center from the Port Authority of New York and New Jersey in 1970. That year, the New York City Planning Commission considered transferring the site's unused air rights across the street to 1 Broadway, where the Walter Kidde Company planned to build a 50-story skyscraper. In exchange, the Walter Kidde Company would have been required to help preserve the Custom House. When the Customs Service moved out during 1973, the building had 1,375 employees, and the land under the building was estimated to be worth between $15 million and $20 million. (Note: Equivalent to $83–111 million in 2025) The General Services Administration (GSA) acquired the Bowling Green Custom House after the Customs Service relocated.

=== Abandonment and restoration proposals ===
==== 1970s plans ====
Several lawyers and businessmen had formed the nonprofit Custom House Institute in late 1973. With assistance from several organizations and the city government's Office of Lower Manhattan Development, the institute raised $40,000 to conduct a feasibility study of the various plans for the Custom House. In March 1974, the institute recommended a proposal by architect I. M. Pei, who suggested converting the upper floors into office space, keeping the second-floor rotunda open, and converting the first floor to commercial use. The next year, the federal government declared the building "surplus" property, making it available to the city government. Pei's proposal was not carried out, as the GSA found it impractical. Instead, the GSA cleaned the facade during the mid-1970s.

From 1974 on, the Custom House was largely vacant. The building's primary occupant was the United States Bankruptcy Court for the Southern District of New York, which occupied two stories; the Custom House Institute occupied the first floor. The other floors remained unused and were seldom open to the public except for special events. These included the bicentennial of the United States in 1976, a summer arts program in 1977, and another arts exhibition in 1979. Different parts of the building fell into various states of disrepair. Marsh's ceiling murals and the commissioner's room remained relatively intact, but there was peeling paint in other offices, and weeds were growing from the statues outside.

The GSA announced a plan in 1977 to convert the building into federal offices for $20 million, but there was no progress for a year. The agency indicated in January 1979 that it would spend $25 million on renovating the Bowling Green Custom House. (Note: Equivalent to $89 million in 2025) U.S. senator Daniel Patrick Moynihan gave U.S. House representatives a tour of the building to convince them to fund its renovation. In September 1979, in part because of his advocacy, Congress approved $26.5 million for the renovation, including the restoration of Marsh's murals. The GSA decided to host a competition for the Custom House's restoration and reuse. The entrance and rotunda were to be refurbished; the upper stories would contain upgraded offices for the federal government, while the lower stories would host a public institution.

==== 1980s plans ====
A joint venture of Marcel Breuer Associates, James Stewart Polshek Associates, Stewart Daniel Hoban and Associates, and Goldman-Sokolow-Copeland was selected in January 1980 to restore the building. The joint venture planned to restore the rotunda in a way that would allow the space to be used by a variety of tenants, rather than tailoring it for a specific use. Under this proposal, four 45-foot-high (14 m) atriums would have been built around the rotunda on the upper floors. In addition, the space beneath the rotunda would have been renovated, and a subway entrance would have been added. This proposal was never carried out because of bureaucratic delays. The federal government contemplated declaring the building surplus property in February 1983, allowing federal officials to sell it to a private owner, but Moynihan intervened and convinced federal officials to keep the building.

The GSA opened a request for proposals in November 1983, soliciting tenants for 77,000 square feet (7,200 m^{2}) at the Custom House. Six plans were presented to Manhattan Community Board 1 in August 1984. The GSA gave the most consideration to two plans: one for a Holocaust museum and the other for a cultural and educational center with an ocean liner museum, restaurants, and theaters. The community board's members were overwhelmingly in favor of the cultural and educational center, while Jewish groups preferred the Holocaust museum. The Holocaust museum proposal was selected in October 1984, prompting objections from preservationists who thought it was "inappropriate" for a Holocaust museum to be located in the Custom House. New York governor Mario Cuomo proposed an alternate site in nearby Battery Park City for the museum (later known as the Museum of Jewish Heritage), and the museum agreed in 1986 to relocate to Battery Park City.

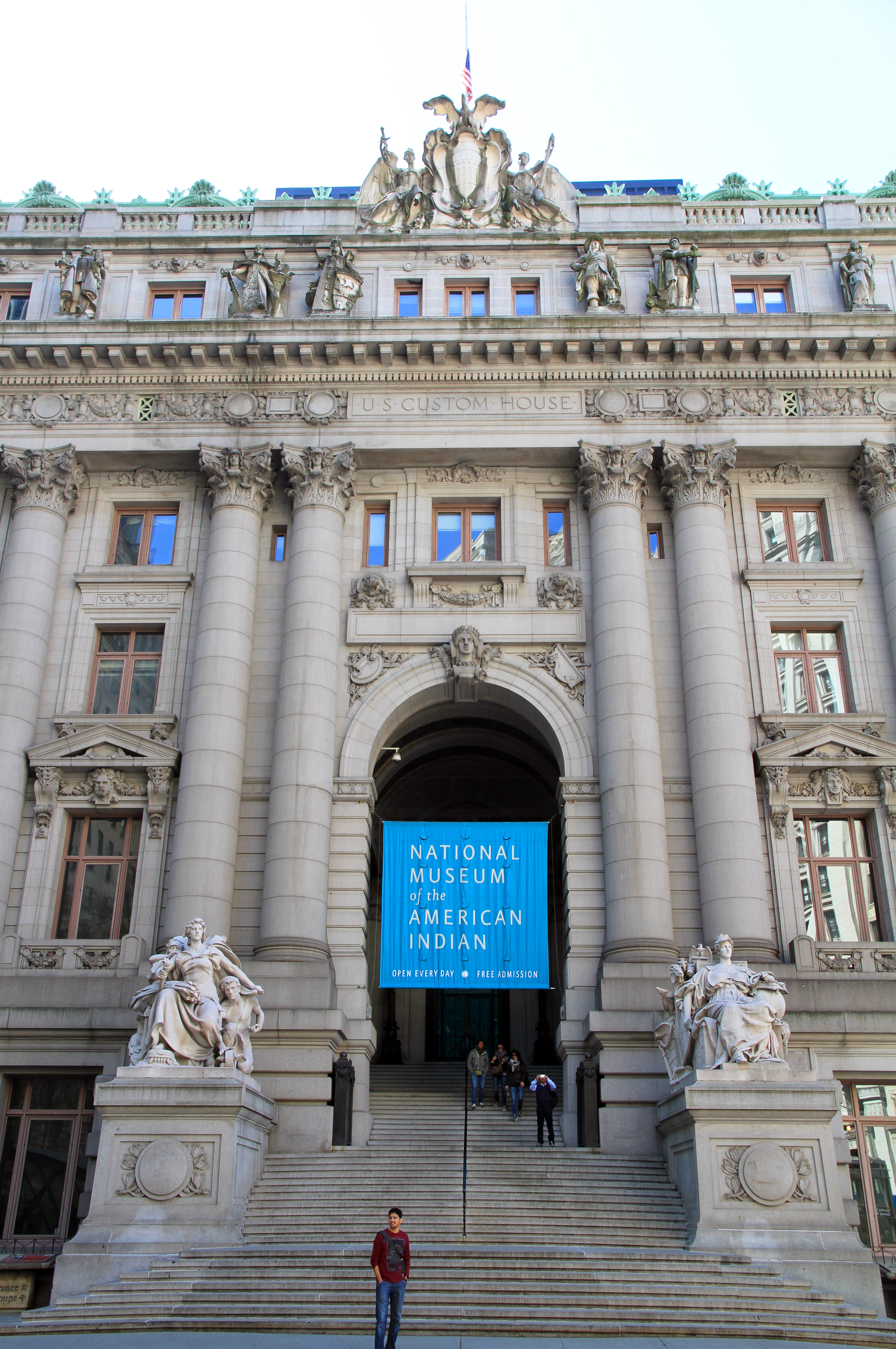
Main entrance, seen in 2013

An $18.3 million renovation (Note: Equivalent to $48 million in 2025) began in August 1984. Ehrenkrantz and Eckstut Architects conducted the renovation. They cleaned, restored, and conserved exterior and ceremonial interior spaces. The restoration architects renovated old office space into federal courtrooms and ancillary offices; rental offices and meeting rooms; and a 350-seat auditorium. The building's fire-safety, security, telecommunications, and heating, ventilation, and air conditioning systems were also upgraded.

=== Museum of the American Indian operation ===
==== Agreement and renovation ====
By early 1987, Moynihan was proposing legislation that would turn over the building to the Museum of the American Indian (later the George Gustav Heye Center). The museum had outgrown its existing headquarters at Audubon Terrace in Upper Manhattan, and it was considering either relocating to Texas or merging with the American Museum of Natural History. The American Indian Community House, which wished to occupy a part of the Custom House, argued against giving the building to the Museum of the American Indian, saying that the museum's leadership was largely not Native American. At the time, the Museum of the American Indian wished to relocate because its Upper Manhattan facility was insufficient, and the Custom House was being offered as an alternative for the museum's possible relocation to Washington, D.C. U.S. Senator Daniel Inouye introduced the National Museum of the American Indian Act the next month, which would have brought the collection to Washington, D.C., instead.

A compromise was reached in 1988, in which the Smithsonian Institution would build the National Museum of the American Indian in Washington, D.C. The Smithsonian would also acquire the Heye collection and operate a satellite location of the museum at the Custom House. The museum would only occupy the lowest floors of the Custom House; the fifth through seventh floors would be reserved for the Bankruptcy Court. City officials and museum officials agreed to this compromise in January 1989, and the National Museum of the American Indian Act was passed that November. The architecture firm Ehrenkrantz Eckstut & Whitelaw was hired in May 1990 to renovate the building. The same year, the building was officially renamed after Alexander Hamilton, the first Secretary of the Treasury, by act of Congress. The building's renovation included constructing an auditorium on the ground level; converting the cashiers' office into a visitor center; and adding gallery space, two gift shops, a theater, offices, and classrooms. The renovation cost $24 million in total.

==== Opening of museum and 21st century ====
The George Gustav Heye Center's space in the Custom House opened for previews in November 1992. The galleries to the west, south, and east of the rotunda formally opened on October 30, 1994. At that time, most of the space had been closed for 20 years. The Heye Center was housed in the three lower stories, while the Bankruptcy Court occupied two additional stories. One of the Bankruptcy Court's rooms on the fifth floor, known as the Eastern Airlines Room, had been renovated to accommodate bankruptcy hearings for large companies such as Eastern Air Lines. The other two stories were vacant and had not been renovated, but the GSA planned to refurbish these stories.

The museum and building were mostly undamaged by the September 11 attacks in 2001, but airborne debris from the collapse of the World Trade Center had to be cleared from some of the interior spaces. The Heye Center's exhibition and public access areas originally totaled about 20,000 square feet (1,900 m^{2}). The museum expanded into part of the ground floor in 2006. The National Archives and Records Administration (NARA) offices in New York moved to the Custom House in 2012. After a storm surge flooded the building during Hurricane Sandy that year, the GSA decided to build a retaining wall around the Custom House. In 2023, the federal government allocated $11 million to build the retaining wall using environmentally friendly materials such as low-emission concrete. SuperStructures Engineers + Architects was hired to design the renovation, which would cost $131.3 million and be completed in two phases.

== Impact and legacy ==
=== Reception ===
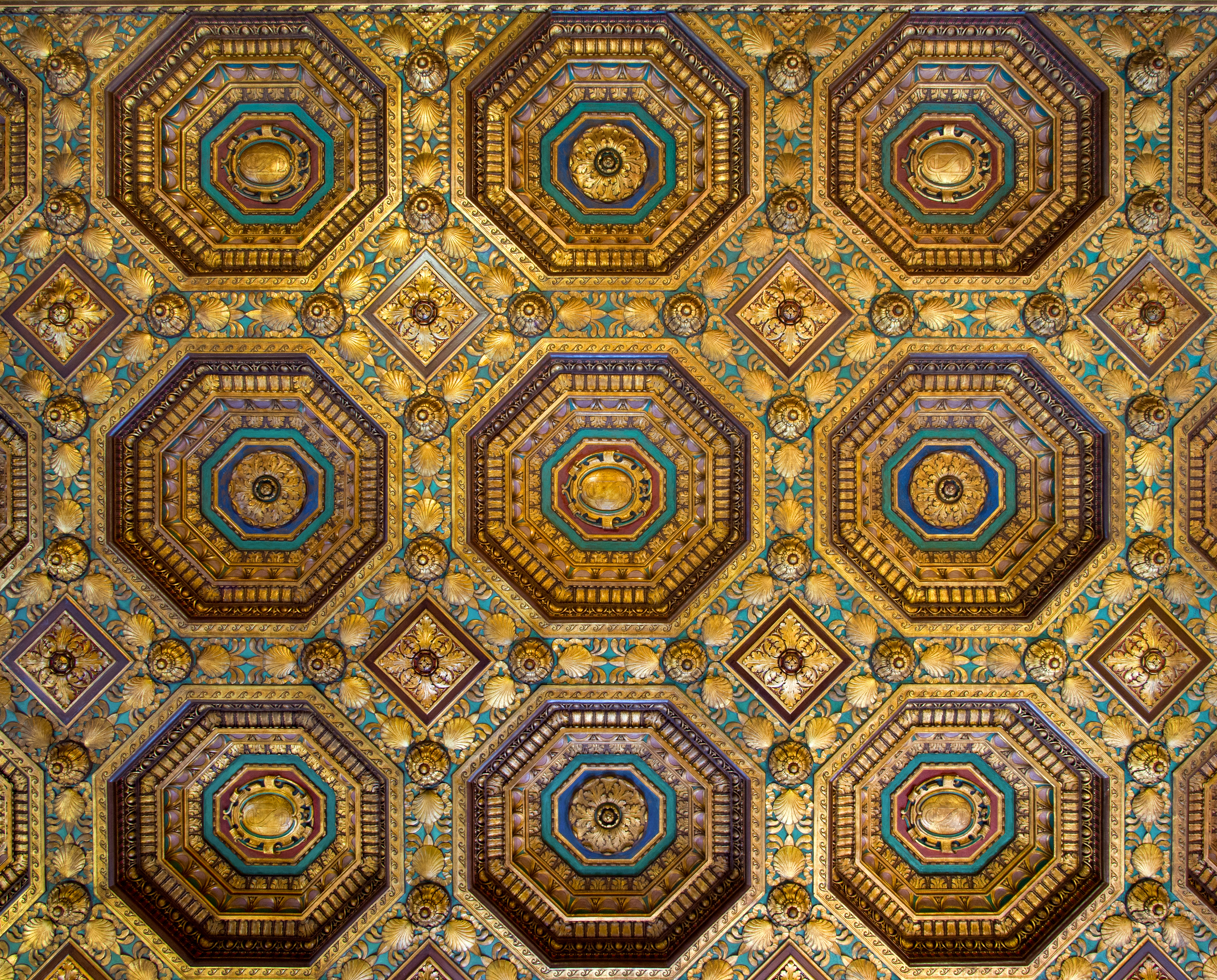
Ornate ceiling in the Collector's Office, consisting of gold and brown-colored motifs surrounding a grid of octagons

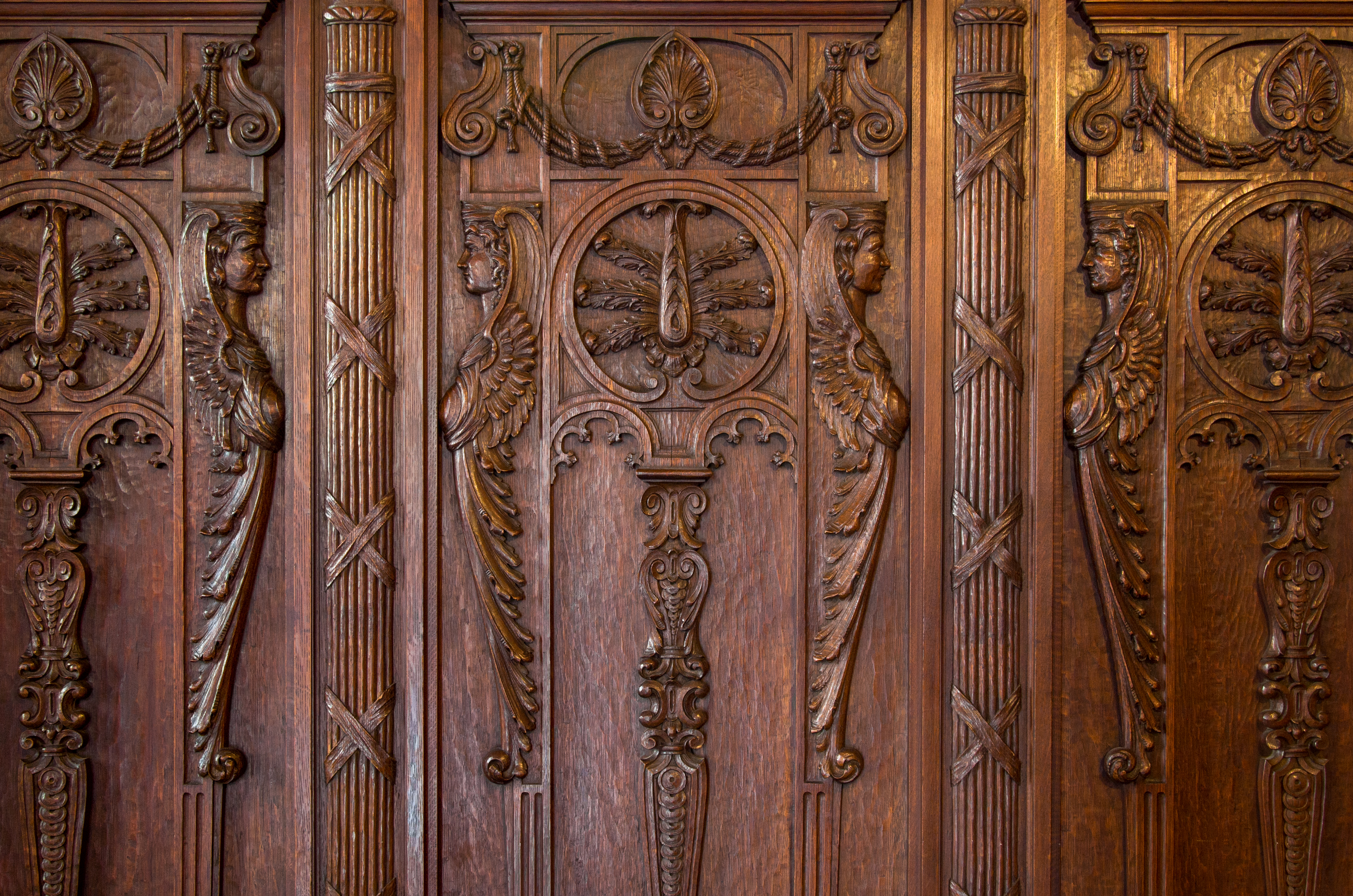
Carvings in wooden wall panels in the Collector's Office

Gilbert stated that, during the design process, a tall dome was suggested in order to make the building into a "landmark" but that "this would wholly destroy the proportions of the building per se, and as a matter of plan, seriously impair its practical usefulness". Gilbert said a 400-foot (120 m) storage tower would be more appropriate if a "landmark" was necessitated, but he believed such a tower "would add considerably to the cost".

From the start, the Alexander Hamilton Custom House was architecturally distinguished from other buildings in the area. The New York Times said in 1906 that "it is the unity of idea embodied in the new Custom House and enforced by the wealth of sculpture with which it is embellished, more than its mere costliness, that gives to the edifice its unique value". A Times editorial the same year said that, despite the federal government's initial reluctance to decorate the Custom House lavishly, "few recall the money sunk into stone, bricks and mortar; they enjoy the final touches inside on which millions were not squandered". The Crockery & Glass Journal stated in 1907 that the building's quality was derived from its "proportion, with rich simplicity—the Roman recipe". The same year, Charles DeKay wrote for Century magazine that "at least something has been done to blunt the reproof that New York, a city by the sea, great through the ocean and our magnificent waterways, rarely remembers the sources of her wealth and greatness". The Wall Street Journal wrote in 1914 that the Custom House "represents the national Government in its economic bases and financial life".

Acclaim for the building continued in the decades after its completion. Architectural writer Henry Hope Reed Jr. regarded the Custom House in 1964 as "the finest public building in New York". When the U.S. Customs Service relocated in 1973, Ada Louise Huxtable wrote that 6 World Trade Center's "functional, featureless grid" contrasted with the "splendor" of the Alexander Hamilton Custom House. Architectural writer Robert A. M. Stern and his co-authors, in the 1983 book New York 1900, said that the Custom House and the Ellis Island immigration station were the two structures that reinforced New York City's role as "the leading American metropolis, representative of America's role in the world".

After the lower floors were converted into the Heye Center, Benjamin Forgey of The Washington Post wrote that the galleries were "conceived as neutral containers, a sequence of vaulted rooms ingeniously constructed within the old building frame in order not to damage (or indeed even to touch) the original walls". A writer for USA Today called the building "itself a sight to see". Stern and his co-authors wrote in the 2006 book New York 2000 that the building, which had been one of the Financial District's "most distinguished white elephants", became a "destination spot" once the Heye Center moved in. Several critics wrote about the juxtaposition of the Custom House's classical architecture and the Heye Center's focus on Native American culture, which, according to Stern and his co-authors, was largely characterized as "a culturally and stylistically inconsistent mix". A writer for The Wall Street Journal believed that the museum clashed with "the Custom House itself, which with its newly cleaned ceiling murals depicting ferries and ships seems a bizarre venue for looking at Indian art".

=== Landmark designations and media ===
The Custom House was one of the first 20 designations of the New York City Landmarks Preservation Commission, becoming an official exterior landmark in October 1965, six months after the city's landmarks law was signed. At the time of the exterior designation, the commission said that "At some time in the future this building may be in jeopardy", since the federal government had doubted whether the Custom House should be made a city landmark. The Custom House's interior was also designated as a city landmark in January 1979. The building's exterior and public interior spaces were listed on the National Register of Historic Places in 1972. The structure also received a National Historic Landmark designation in 1976, marking it as a site that adds "exceptional value to the nation". In addition, the Custom House was added to the New York State Register of Historic Places in 1980. In 2007, it was designated as a contributing property to the Wall Street Historic District, an NRHP district.

The U.S. Custom House has been used as a filming location for dozens of movies and TV shows. Its exterior and lobby were used as a filming location in the 1989 American supernatural comedy film Ghostbusters II, where the building stood in for the fictional Manhattan Museum of Art. The building has also been used as a filming location for other movies such as Inside Man (2006), How To Lose A Guy In 10 Days (2003), and Black Swan. In addition, it has been depicted in commercials for Citibank and BMW.

== See also ==
- List of New York City Designated Landmarks in Manhattan below 14th Street
- National Historic Landmarks in New York City
- National Register of Historic Places listings in Manhattan below 14th Street
