= Mary Fife Laning =

American painter (c.1900 – 1991)

- Born: Mary Elizabeth Fife; August 26, 1900; Cleveland Ohio, US
- Died: 1991
- Education: Art Students League
- Known for: Painting
- Spouse: Edward Laning

Mary Fife Laning was an American painter and printmaker working in a social realist style with a feminist perspective.

== Career ==
Mary Elizabeth Fife was born on August 26, 1900, to Adison J. Fife and Catharine Campbell in Cleveland, Ohio. She grew up in Canton, Ohio.

In 1923, she earned a B.A. from the Carnegie Institute of Technology. In 1925–1927, she did postgraduate work at Cooper Union, where she earned an award for best mural painting in 1926. In 1928, she studied at the Academie Russe in Paris.

From 1930 to 1935, she studied at the Art Students League under Kenneth Hayes Miller. There she met her husband, Edward Laning, whom she married on her birthday in 1933. The Lanings became part of the Miller circle with Reginald Marsh and Isabel Bishop.

The Lanings lived most of their lives in Brooklyn, New York. As a painter, muralist, and printmaker, Fife Laning explored social realist subject matter. Her art reflected life in New York in the mid 20th century, contributing to the style developed by the Fourteenth Street School of New York in the 1930s.

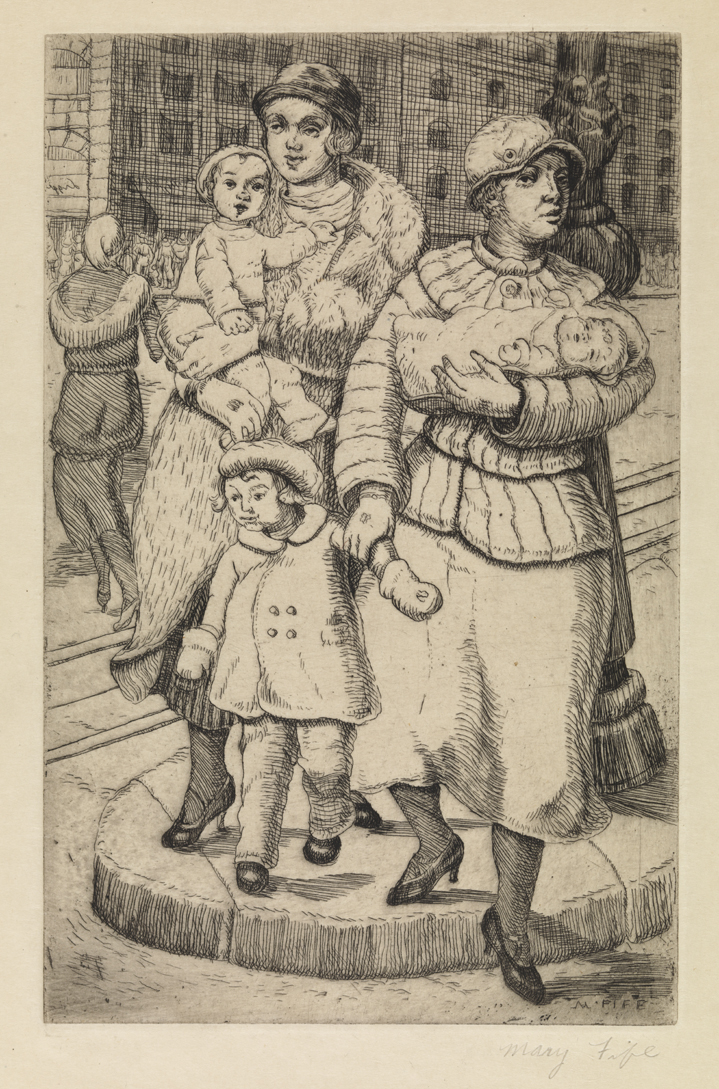
Etching Ed. about 10

In 1937, her painting A Place in the Sun (1934) garnered acclaim at the Annual Exhibition of Contemporary American Painting at the Whitney Museum of American Art. From 1936 to 1937, Fife Laning worked alongside Marsh and seven other artists for a Works Progress Administration-sponsored ceiling fresco in the U.S. Customs House. The other artists were Xavier J. Barile, Lloyd Lozes Goff, Ludwig Mactarian, Oliver M. Baker, John Poehler, J. Walkely, and E. Volsung. Recalling her work on the project, Fife Laning said:

I would get up at three in the morning on a cold spring day and take the Broadway bus down to the Battery, where Reg would be waiting in the dark to board the tugboat which was going out to meet an incoming liner. . . Reg wanted details of lifeboats, davits, hawsers, ventilators, stacks, masts and rigging, sirens, bells, deck-chairs—everything.

In the 1940s, as a member of the National Association of Women Artists, Fife Laning taught (with her husband) at the Kansas City Art Institute. In 1961, she was appointed the head of the art department at Birch-Wathem School, New York, where she remained until 1970.

She survived her husband by a decade, dying in 1991.

== Works ==
Fife's work was exhibited at the Butler Art Institute, Ohio, the Art Institute of Chicago, and the Whitney Museum of American Art, and in 2015 at Enduring America: Selections from the Collection of Art and Peggy Hittner Exhibition organized by Northern Arizona University Art Museum. It is in the collections of the Whitney Museum and Pennsylvania Academy of Fine Arts.

=== Paintings ===
- Girl with Open Blouse (1925)
- Place in the Sun (1934), tempera and oil on Masonite panel; 24 x 30 inches
- Forbidden Love (1935)
- The Lovers (1st Stoop) (1935)
- Klein's Dressing Room (1930s)
- Rocky Shore Newport RI (undated)
- Untitled (1946) Painting of Mary and her sisters in Greece.

=== Exhibitions ===
Sources:

- Annual Exhibition of American Painting and Sculpture, Art Institute of Chicago, 1935
- Third Biennial Exhibition of Contemporary American Painting, Whitney Museum of American Art, 1936
- Annual Exhibition of Contemporary American Painting, Whitney Museum of American Art, 1937
- Annual Exhibition of Contemporary American Painting, Whitney Museum of American Art, 1940
- Portrait of America Exhibition, organized by American Artists for Victory, Pepsi-Cola Company, 1945
- Missouri Exhibition, St. Louis Art Museum and the Nelson-Atkins Museum of Art, Kansas City, 1946
- Exhibition of Kansas City Artists, Centennial Art Museum, Corpus Christi, Texas, 1949
- Kansas City Art Institute Faculty Exhibition, 1950
- National Association of Women Artists Exhibition, organized by National Academy of Design, 1967
- Between Heaven and Hell: Union Square in the 1930s, Sardoni Gallery, 1996
- New York Intaglio Figure, 1917 to 1954, Susan Teller Gallery, 2006
- Enduring America: Selections from the Collection of Art and Peggy Hittner Exhibition, organized by Northern Arizona University Art Museum, 2015

=== Awards ===
- National Association of Women Artists' Lillian Cotton Award, 1966
- The National Academy of Design Figure Prize, 1967
- The Pen + Brush Prize, 1969

== External sources ==
- Wooden, Howard E. (1982). Edward Laning, American Realist, 1906-1981: A Retrospective Exhibition: Essay and Exhibition Catalogue. Wichita, Kansas: Wichita Art Museum.
- Edward Laning: Paintings and Drawings, March 21-April 18, 1992. New York: Kennedy Galleries. 1992. LCCN 93136738.
- Missouri Remembers Artists Portal
- "Interview with Mary Fife Laning," Archives of American Art, https://www.si.edu/object/interview-mary-fife-laning:AAADCD_item_23890
