= Birch Bayh Federal Building and United States Courthouse =

Building in Indianapolis, Indiana

- U.S. Courthouse and Post Office
- U.S. National Register of Historic Places

- Location within Indianapolis Location within Indianapolis Location within Indiana Location within the United States
- Location: 46 E. Ohio St., Indianapolis, Indiana, U.S.
- Coordinates: 39°46′14″N 86°9′25″W
- Area: 3.8 acres (1.5 ha)
- Built: 1905
- Architect: John Hall Rankin and Thomas Kellogg
- Architectural style: Late 19th and 20th Century Revivals, Classical Revival
- NRHP reference No.: 74000033
- Added to NRHP: January 11, 1974

The Birch Bayh Federal Building and U.S. Courthouse, formerly known as the U.S. Courthouse and Post Office and as the Federal Building, is a courthouse of the United States District Court for the Southern District of Indiana, located in Indianapolis. It is a distinguished example of Beaux-Arts architecture, and was listed in the National Register of Historic Places in 1974. Constructed from 1902 to 1905, the United States District Court for the District of Indiana met here until it was subdivided in 1928; the United States Circuit Court for the District of Indiana met here until that court was abolished in 1912. It was listed on the National Register of Historic Places as "U.S. Courthouse and Post Office" in 1974. The courthouse was renamed in honor of Senator Birch Bayh in 2003.

== Building history ==
The building was one of only 35 federal buildings constructed under the Tarsney Act of 1893. The United States Treasury Department sought designs for the new federal building from private architectural firms through an open competition allowed under the Act. John Hall Rankin and Thomas Kellogg, noted Philadelphia architects, secured the design contract, and the Treasury Department accepted the New York-based John Pierce Company's low construction bid of $1,300,000. (The final cost, however, reached nearly $2,000,000.) Begun in 1902 and completed in 1905, the new federal building was massive. Accommodating 925 federal employees, the U-shaped Beaux-Arts structure occupied an entire block, rose four stories, and housed federal courts, offices, and the main post office.

Beaux-Arts classicism, often reflected in federal buildings of this era, was popularized by the majestic buildings of the Chicago World's Fair in 1893. Monumental design and formal planning of spaces are hallmarks of the style. The Federal Building and U.S. Courthouse inspired Beaux-Arts designs for other public buildings in Indianapolis, including Indianapolis City Hall (1910), the Indianapolis Public Library (1917), and buildings in the Indiana World War Memorial Plaza (dedicated in 1927).

== Architecture ==
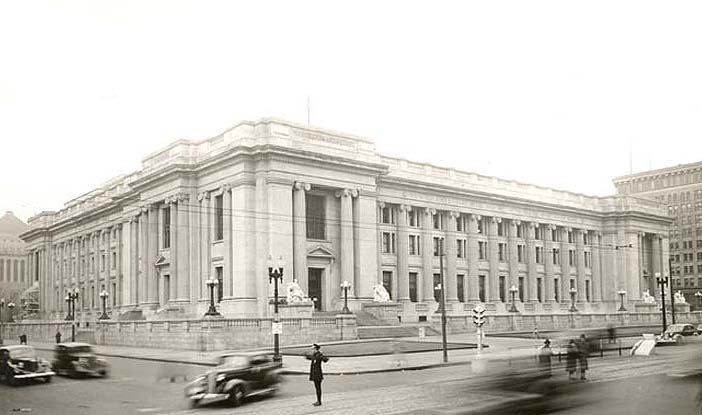
Completed in 1905, the building is an example of Beaux-Arts architecture, a popular style of its time.

Resting on a gray granite foundation, the Neo-Classic building is a steel-framed, flat-roofed structure clad with Indiana limestone. The south (front) elevation has eleven bays, separated by three-story Ionic engaged columns and flanked by entry pavilions. Each pavilion has a central cast-bronze and glass doorway, reached by a wide, shallow gray granite stair flanked by pedestals with heroic allegorical sculptures by John Massey Rhind entitled Industry, Science (or Justice), Agriculture, and Literature.

Completed in 1905, the new federal building was originally U-shaped. The symmetrical facade features evenly spaced Ionic pilasters and terraces with stone balusters. A heavy classical cornice tops the building. A five-story addition, completed in 1938, enclosed the original U-shaped plan, creating an interior courtyard. The addition is compatible with the original building, featuring classical ornamentation mixed with modern details such as the stylized relief over the entrances.

The original impressive scale and richly ornamented interior design elements remain intact. Mosaic tile ceilings, cantilevered marble staircases, and much of the original decorative artwork and furnishings are still in place. The major interior spaces of the building are the first-floor lobbies and connecting corridor and the original courtrooms at the southeast and southwest corners of the second floor. The exterior entry doors at the southeast and southwest corners of the first floor open into barrel-vaulted corridors with white marble walls and brown and green marble pilasters and columns. The corridors lead to vaulted octagonal vestibules that feature red marble walls and gray Tuscan columns, as well as Roman-style mosaics on the ceilings. Arched openings of the octagonal vestibules lead to lobbies with elevators and grand staircases, and to the four-part vaulted connecting corridor. The semicircular marble staircases are among the finest examples of cantilevered (supported only from one end) stone stairs in the United States.

Among the most impressive interior features of the building are the Depression-era murals. Working under the Treasury Relief Art Project, which aimed to restore faith in the country through patriotic and historically themed art, master artist Grant Christian painted murals that depict the history of transportation and delivery of mail in Indianapolis. Christian was paid $1.55 per hour while his assistant, Reynolds Selfridge, received half that much. The courtrooms feature handsome marble floors, colored marble and plaster wall finishes, and elaborately ornamented, gilded, and painted plaster beam and panel ceilings with skylights. Bronzed railings, stained-glass windows, and heavy wrought-iron gates provide detail to these rooms, which also still have their original furniture. Allegorical representations of the Appeal to Justice and Justice and Mercy by William B. Van Ingen placed above each judge's bench symbolize the seriousness of their responsibility.

Depression-era interior modifications were mostly cosmetic in nature. These included replacement of open metal grillwork doors on the elevators with polished metal doors, and installation of dark green marble-faced walls at elevator entrances. Modern translucent panels replaced the original stained-glass skylights in the second-floor courtrooms.

The first-floor east–west corridor is no longer used as a post office. The postal service windows and mailboxes were removed when these functions were shifted to widely dispersed annexes. Replicas of the service windows were added during the course of restoration, returning the space to its original appearance. In recent years, the General Services Administration (GSA) has reversed some past modifications made in the name of modernization, and has begun conserving important elements of the building. GSA has replaced modern lighting with appropriate period features, repaired mosaic tile ceilings, and restored exterior stonework.

== Significant events ==
- 1902–1905: The Federal Building and U.S. Courthouse is constructed.
- 1935: Treasury Relief Art Project murals by Grant Wright Christian depict the history of transportation and mail delivery in Indianapolis.
- 1938: Addition of north wing is completed.
- 1962: GSA's ongoing preservation work begins.
- 1974: The Federal Building and U.S. Courthouse is listed in the National Register of Historic Places.
- 2003: Building renamed in honor of U.S. Senator Birch Bayh of Indiana.

== Building facts ==
- Architects: John Hall Rankin and Thomas Kellogg
- Construction dates: 1902–1905
- Landmark status: Listed in the National Register of Historic Places
- Location: The city block bounded by Ohio, Meridian, Pennsylvania, and New York Streets
- Architectural style: Classical Revival
- Primary materials: Indiana limestone sheathing over steel framing and reinforced concrete; gray granite base and stairs
- Prominent feature: Elaborate interior finishes including marble, plaster, and mosaics

== See also ==
- List of United States post offices
- National Register of Historic Places listings in Center Township, Marion County, Indiana
