= Grant Wright Christian =

American painter

- Born: July 17, 1911; Edinburgh, Indiana
- Died: May 21, 1989 (aged 77); Franklin, Indiana
- Education: John Herron Art Institute
- Occupation: Painter

Grant Wright Christian (July 17, 1911 – May 21, 1989) was an American artist. He graduated from the John Herron Art Institute in 1933 and later attended the Philadelphia Academy of Fine Arts from which he received the Thouron Prize.

Mail, Delivery and Transportation (1936), mural at the Birch Bayh Federal Building and United States Courthouse

== Biography ==
Grant Wright Christian was born on July 17, 1911, in Edinburgh, Indiana. He was raised on a nearby farm and attended high school. He was inspired by his uncles, artists Franklin Booth and Hanson Booth, and sought a scholarship at the John Herron Art Institute in Indianapolis. He was accepted, and was able to complete four years there through scholarships and working in a restaurant. He graduated in 1933, and received a one-year tuition scholarship to study at the Pennsylvania Academy of Fine Arts. He was awarded the Thouron Prize in composition the following spring. He returned to the John Herron Art Institute for a fifth year in the fall of 1934. Studying under Donald Mattison and Henrik Martin Mayer, he became interested in mural decoration and was encouraged to submit designs for three U.S. government competitions. He was not successful, but the quality of his work earned the attention of the Treasury Department art project administration.

== Career ==
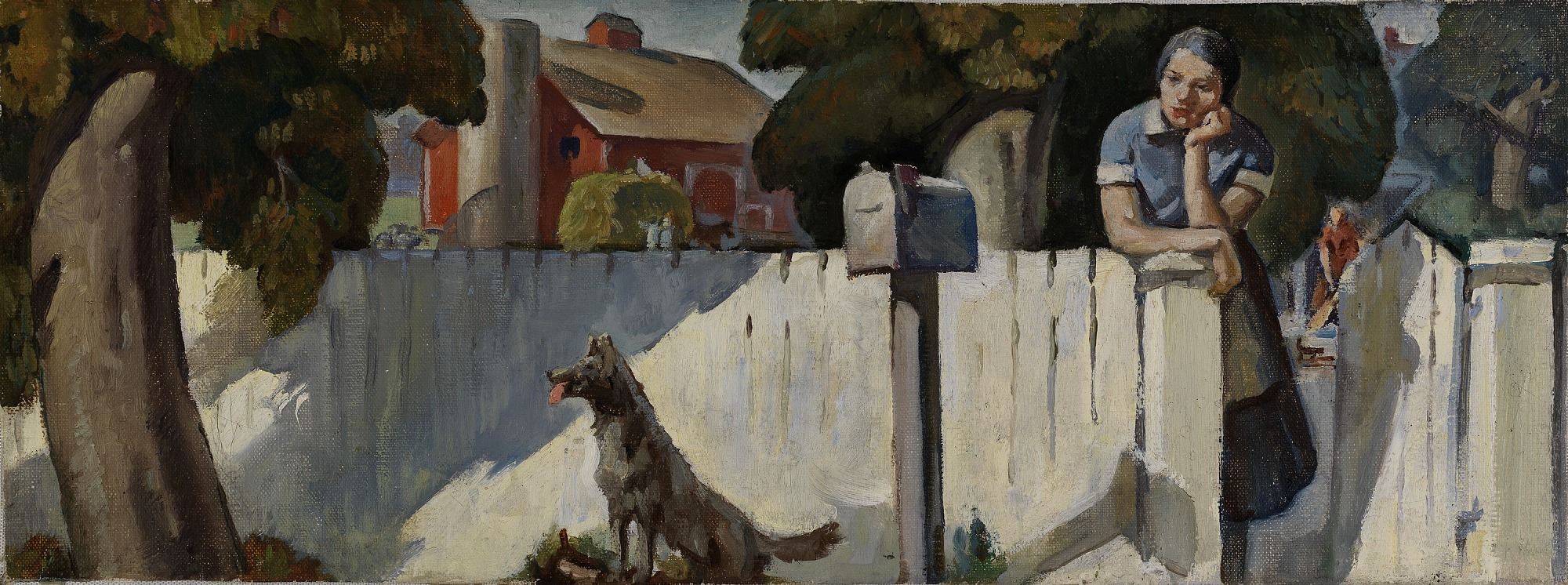
Mural study for Waiting for the Mail (1938)

In 1935 Christian won a Treasury Relief Art Project competition to produce two sets of murals for the Indianapolis post office and court house, a building that is today the Birch Bayh Federal Building and United States Courthouse. The murals are located in the southwest corner of the third floor. The grouping on the south wall is titled Mail, Transportation and Delivery. The panels on the northwest and northeast corners are titled Early and Present Day Indianapolis Life. The project was completed in 1936.

The Section of Painting and Sculpture commissioned Christian to create a mural for the United States Post Office in Nappanee, Indiana. His wistful mural titled Waiting for the Mail was completed in 1938.

== Death ==
Christian died in Franklin, Indiana, on Sunday, May 21, 1989, at the age of 77.
