= Treasury Relief Art Project =

American New Deal work-relief project (1935–1938)

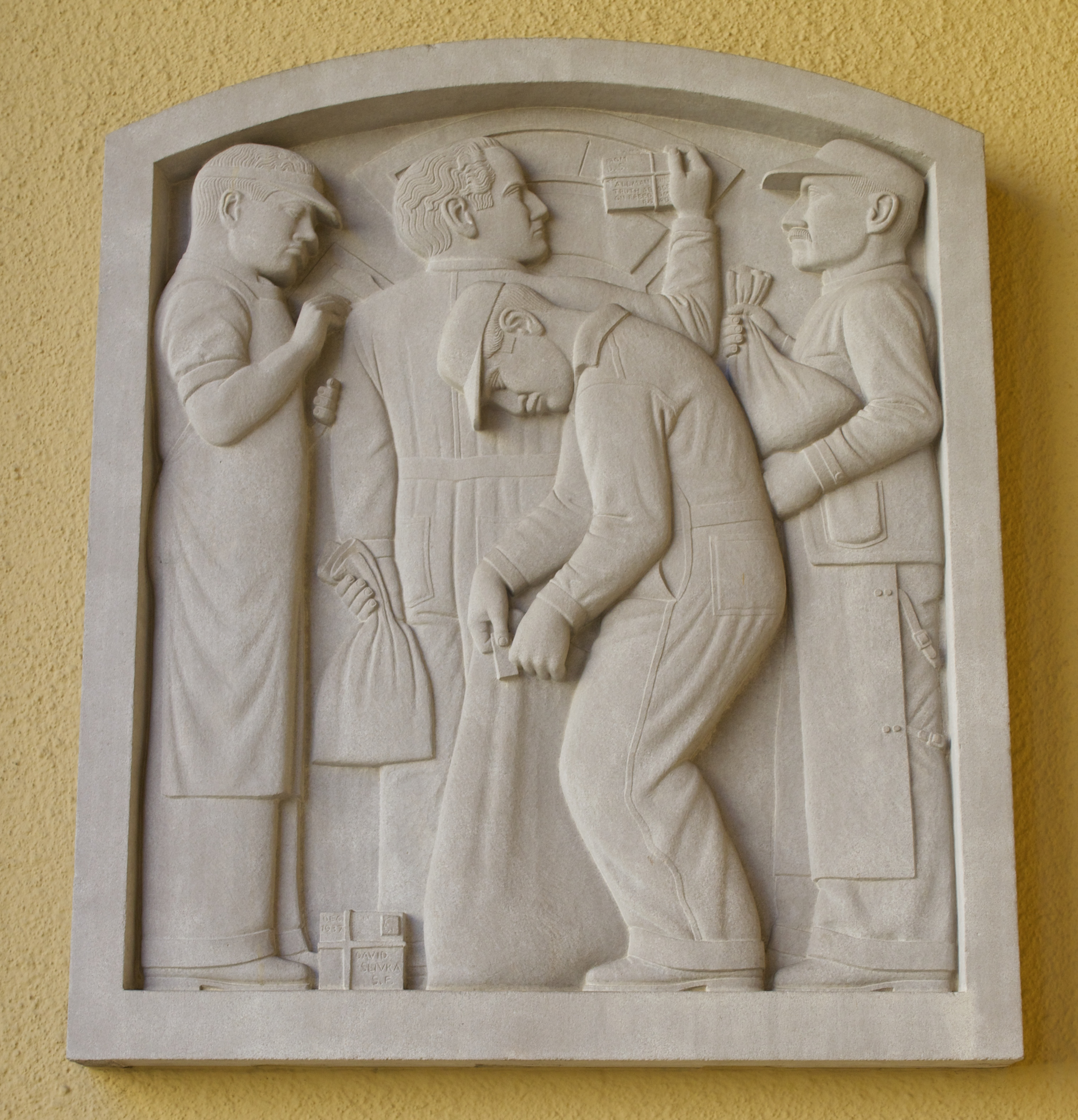
- David Slivka bas relief, Berkeley, Calif. Post Office

Agency overview
- Formed: 1935
- Dissolved: 1938
- Parent agency: United States Department of the Treasury

The Treasury Relief Art Project (TRAP) was a New Deal arts program that commissioned visual artists to provide artistic decoration for existing Federal buildings during the Great Depression in the United States. A project of the United States Department of the Treasury, TRAP was administered by the Section of Painting and Sculpture and funded by the Works Progress Administration, which provided assistants employed through the Federal Art Project. The Treasury Relief Art Project also created murals and sculpture for Public Works Administration housing projects. TRAP was established July 21, 1935, and continued through June 30, 1938.

== Program ==
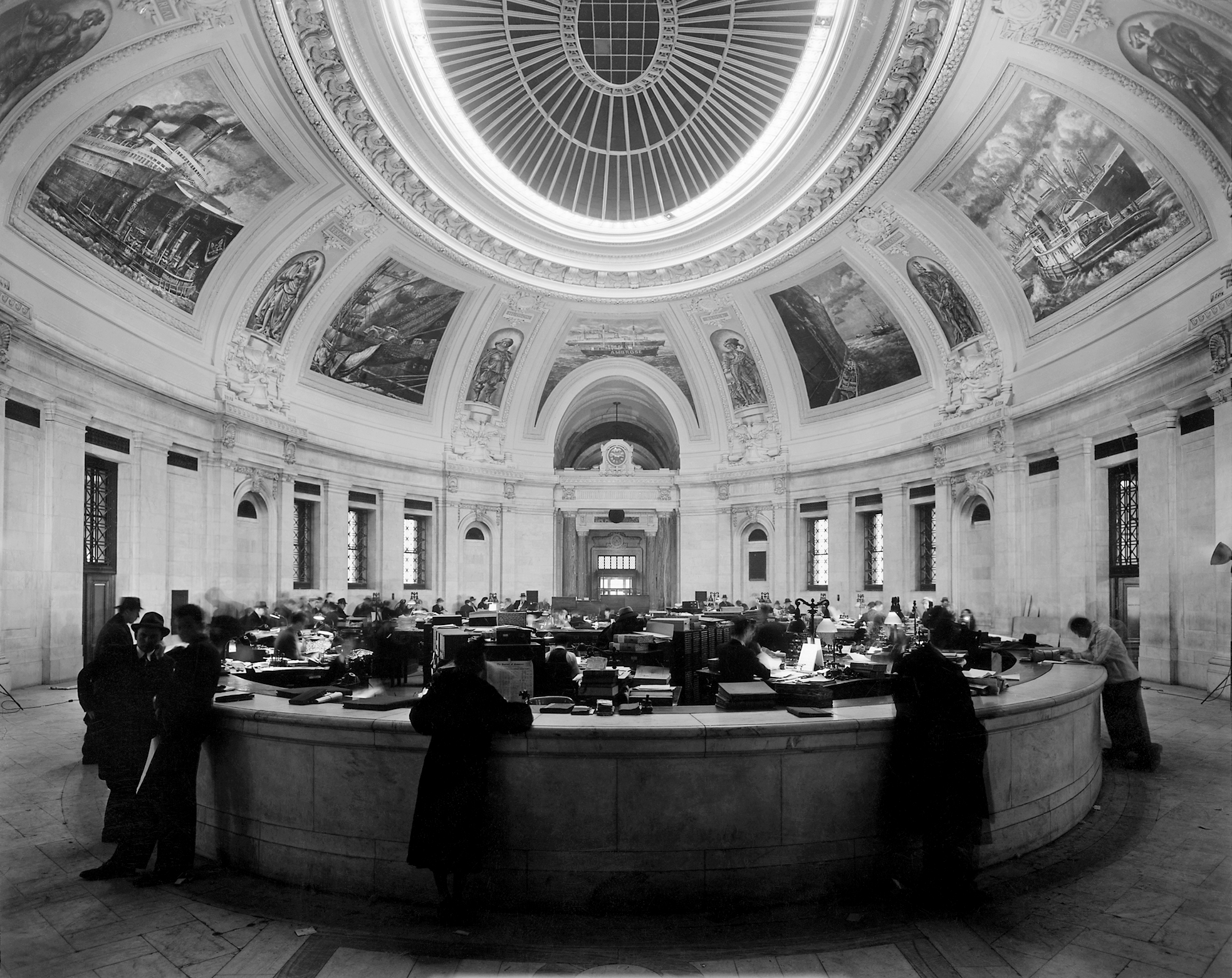
Reginald Marsh and his assistants completed 2,300 ft^{2} (210 m^{2}) of murals in fresco for the rotunda of the Alexander Hamilton U.S. Custom House (1937), the Treasury Relief Art Project's most extensive and successful project in New York.

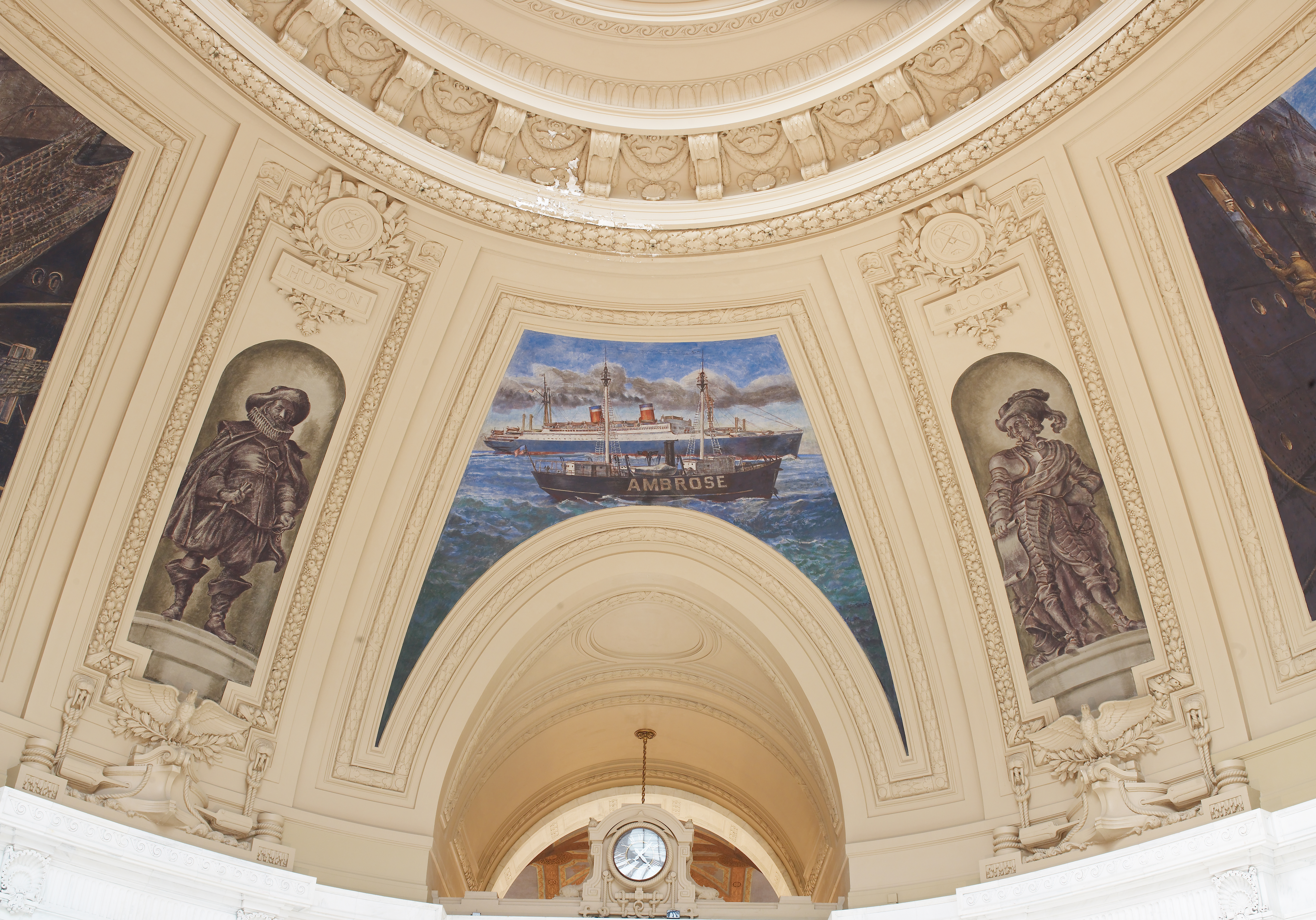
Murals in fresco by Reginald Marsh for the rotunda of the Alexander Hamilton U.S. Custom House (2007)

The Treasury Relief Art Project was created July 21, 1935, with an allocation of $530,784 from the Works Progress Administration. The project was conceived and overseen by Treasury Department arts administrator Edward Bruce. Artist Olin Dows was chief of the Treasury Relief Art Project; Cecil H. Jones, who later succeeded Dows, was assistant chief. Forbes Watson was director. Unlike the concurrent Treasury Section of Painting and Sculpture, TRAP was a work-relief program, subject to the income and employment standards of the WPA. The September 1935 announcement of the program estimated that it would employ 400 to 500 artists.

The principal mission of the Treasury Relief Art Project was to provide artistic decoration for existing Federal buildings. These projects could not be performed by the Section of Painting and Sculpture, which commissioned art for new construction using a percentage of the budget overseen by the Treasury Department's procurement division. The Treasury Relief Art Project was funded by the WPA. The Section supervised the creative output of TRAP, and selected a master artist for each project. Assistants were then chosen by the artist from the rolls of the WPA Federal Art Project.

As chief of the Treasury Relief Art Project, Dows was responsible for maintaining financial records for relief and non-relief personnel. A fixed proportion of all workers was to be taken from the relief rolls—initially 90 percent, but revised to 75 percent in December 1935.

Although it was regarded as a success, the Treasury Relief Art Project was ended June 30, 1938.

== Projects ==
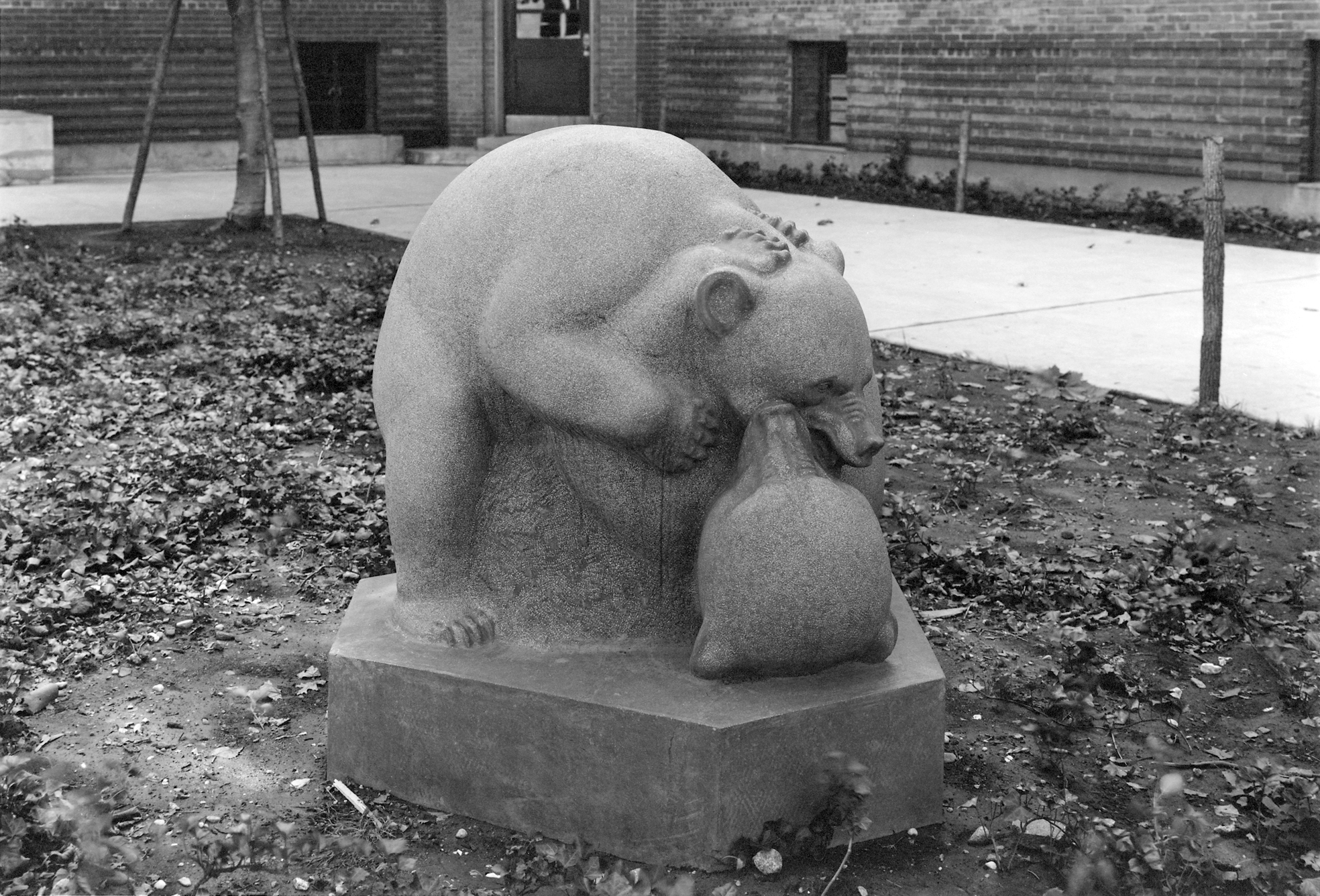
Heinz Warneke, Bears Playing (1938), sculpture for the Harlem River Houses

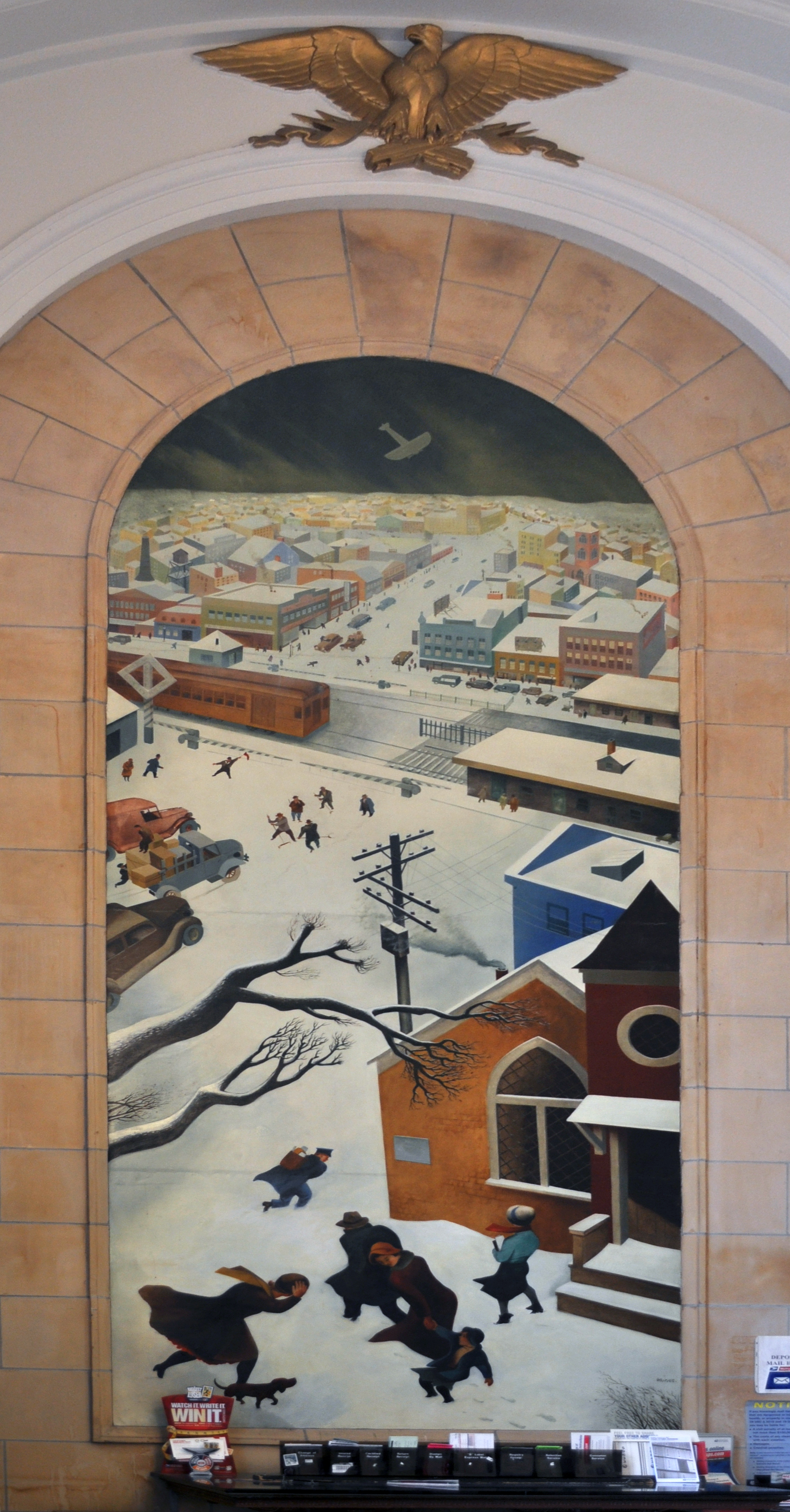
Suburban Post in Winter (1938), mural by William Gropper for the post office in Freeport, New York

At a total cost of $833,784, 89 mural projects and 65 sculpture projects were completed under the Treasury Relief Art Project, as well as 10,000 easel paintings that were distributed to Federal offices.

Reginald Marsh was the master artist commissioned in 1937 to create a cycle of murals in fresco for the rotunda of the Alexander Hamilton U.S. Custom House. Marsh's team of assistants included Oliver M. Baker, Xavier J. Barile, Charles Bateman, Mary Fife, Lloyd Lozes Goff, Ludwig Mactarian, John Poehler, Erica Volsung and J. Walkley, students he knew from his teaching at the Art Students League. It was TRAP's most extensive and successful project in New York, encompassing 2,300 square feet.

Existing post office buildings that received TRAP artwork included the following:

- Beacon, New York
- Berkeley, California
- Cooperstown, New York
- Cranford, New Jersey
- Dover, Delaware
- East Liverpool, Ohio
- Eureka, California
- Freeport, New York
- Geneva, New York
- Hempstead, New York
- Hudson, New York
- Hudson Falls, New York
- Johnson City, New York
- Mount Kisco, New York
- New York General Post Office
- New York General Post Office Annex
- Nyack, New York
- Oyster Bay, New York
- Port Chester, New York
- Port Washington, New York
- Saratoga Springs, New York
- Trenton, New Jersey
- Ventura, California

In addition to producing artwork for Federal buildings, the Treasury Relief Art Project created murals and sculpture for Public Works Administration housing projects in Boston, Camden, Chicago, Cleveland, New York, Washington, D.C. and Stamford.

== Artists ==
To maintain its high artistic standards, the Treasury Relief Art Project commissioned only a small number of artists—356 workers at its peak in 1936. Richmond Barthé, Ahron Ben-Shmuel, Paul Cadmus, Marion Greenwood, William Gropper, Reginald Marsh and Heinz Warneke were among the master artists who led projects. A complete list of projects and artists employed by TRAP is included in the final report held by the Smithsonian's Archives of American Art.

- Grace Greenwood Ames
- Frank Arno
- Oliver M. Baker
- Theodore Barbarossa
- Xavier J. Barile
- Richmond Barthé
- Giuseppe Bartoli
- Richmond Bartoli
- Charles Bateman
- Ahron Ben-Shmuel
- Emil Bisttram
- La Verne Nelson Black
- Clarence Bolton
- Daniel Boza
- Helen Bell Bruton
- Paul Cadmus
- Gustavo Cenci
- Edward Chavez
- Grant Wright Christian
- Lawrence Cupani
- James Daugherty
- Thomas Donnelly
- Aaron Douglas
- Elsie Driggs
- John Fabion
- Mary Fife
- Bernard Finestone
- Gladys Caldwell Fisher
- Gerald Foster
- Frederick Knight
- Robert Fuller
- Vincent Glinsky
- Lloyd Lozes Goff
- Gordon K. Grant
- Marion Greenwood
- William Gropper
- Rudolf Henn
- Ben Hoffman
- Bela Janowsky
- Robert Kaplan
- Charles Kassler
- Frederick Knight
- Thomas Laman
- Harry S. Lane
- Thomas Sergeant La Farge
- Dominic La Salle
- Frederico Lebrun
- Leo Lentelli
- Louis Lozowick
- Frank A. Machera
- Ann B. McNulty
- Ludwig Mactarian
- Jenne Magafan
- Peppino Mangravite
- Reginald Marsh
- Edgar Miller
- James D. Mitchel
- Domenico Mortellito
- Ann Rice O'Hanlon
- Morris Pass
- Channing Peake
- Guy Pène du Bois
- Ernest Peixotto
- Jacob Peltzman
- George A. Picken
- John A. Poehler
- Edna Reindel
- John T. Robertson
- Frank Romanelli
- Charles Rosen
- Victor Salvatore
- Susan Scheuer
- Arthur Schneider
- Leo Schulemowitz
- David Slivka
- Jacob G. Smeth
- Doris Spiegel
- Erwin Springweiler
- Algot Stenbery
- Abell Sturges
- Arthur A. Sturges
- Lorin Thompson
- Conrad Vasquez
- Gaetano Venezia
- Eduardo Villafrato
- Erica Volsung
- Winfield R. Walking
- Heinz Warneke
- William D. White

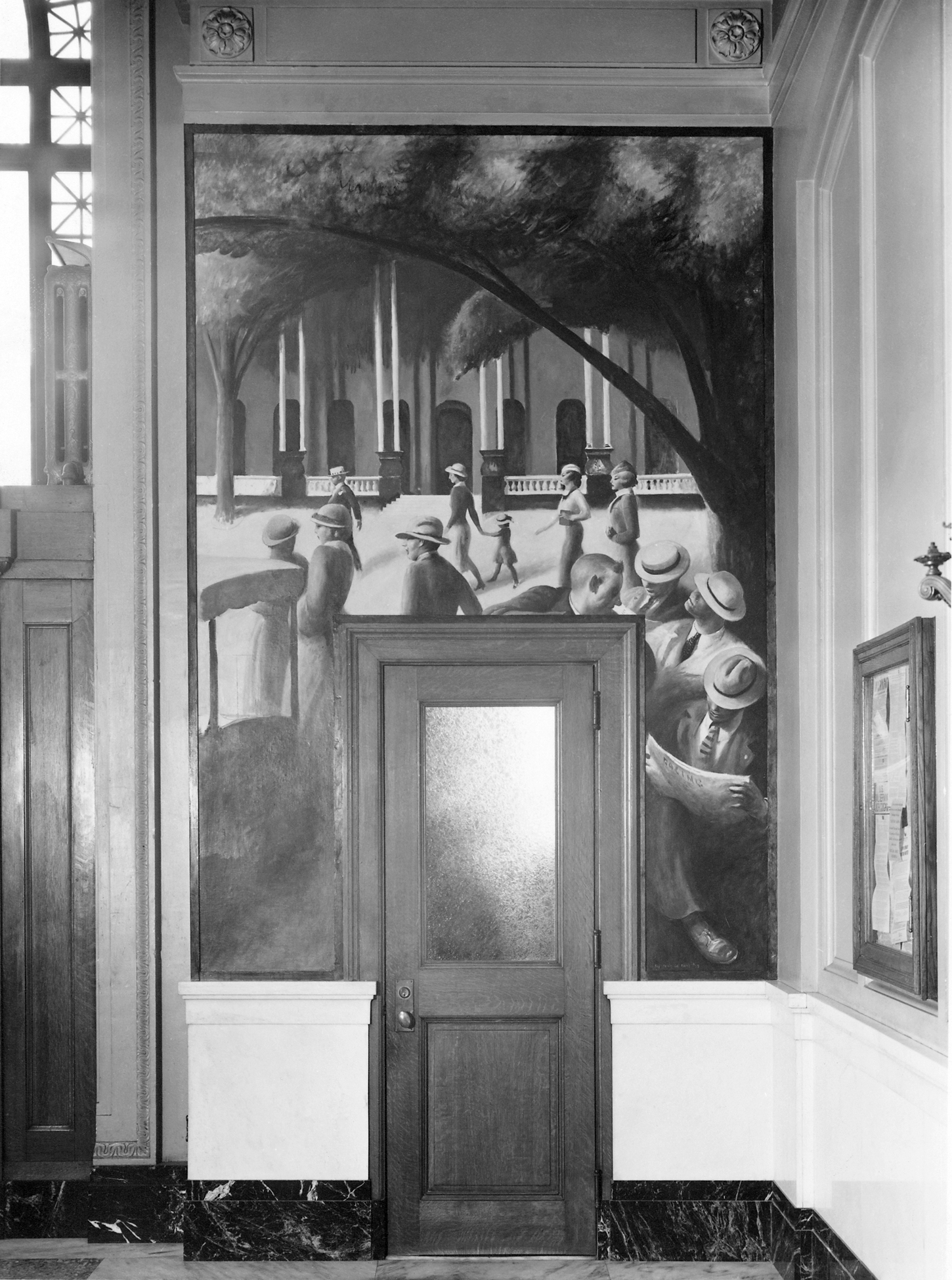
Guy Pène du Bois, Saratoga in Racing Season (1937), United States Post Office, Saratoga Springs, New York

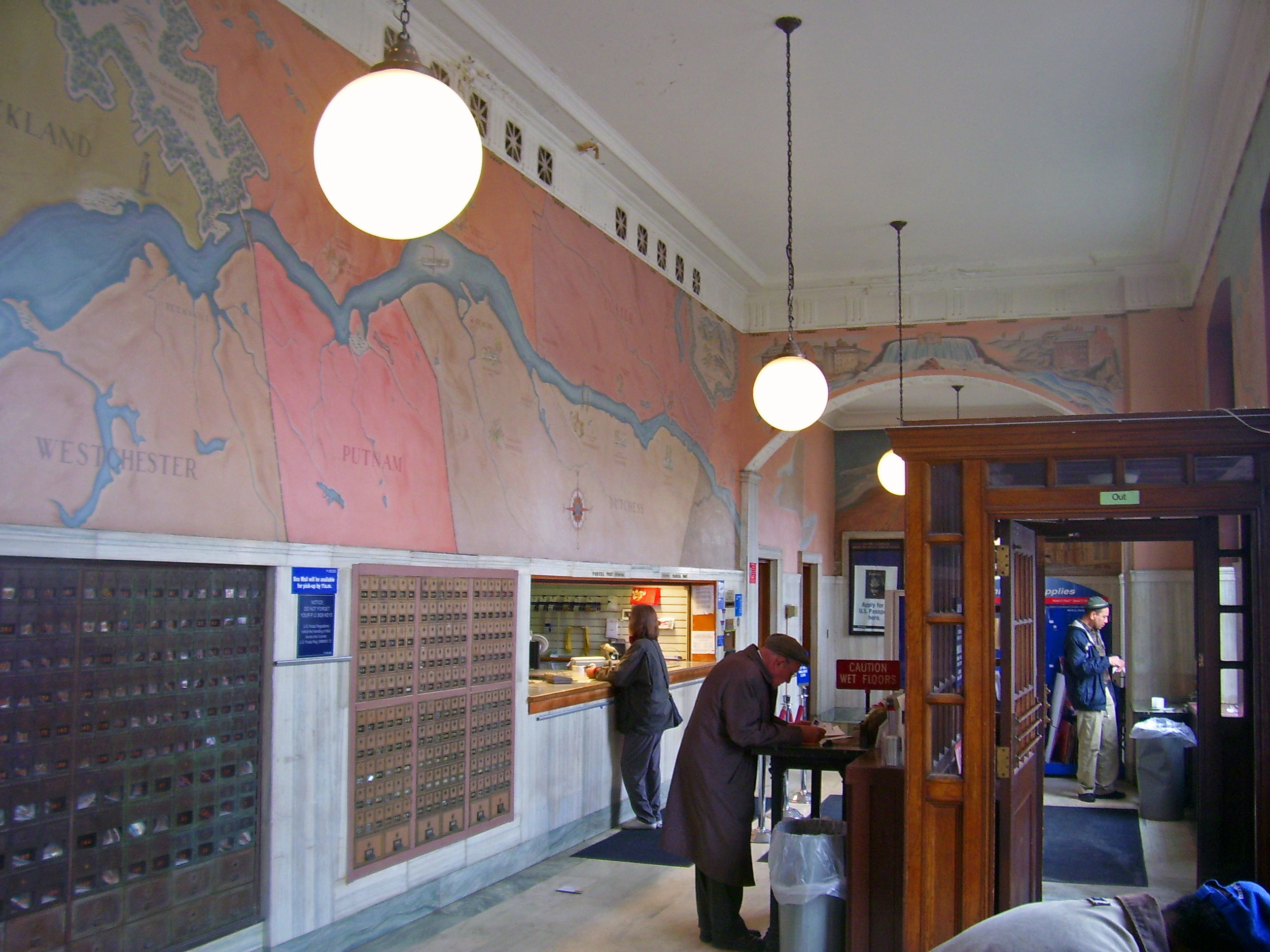
Charles Rosen's mural in the post office in Beacon, New York

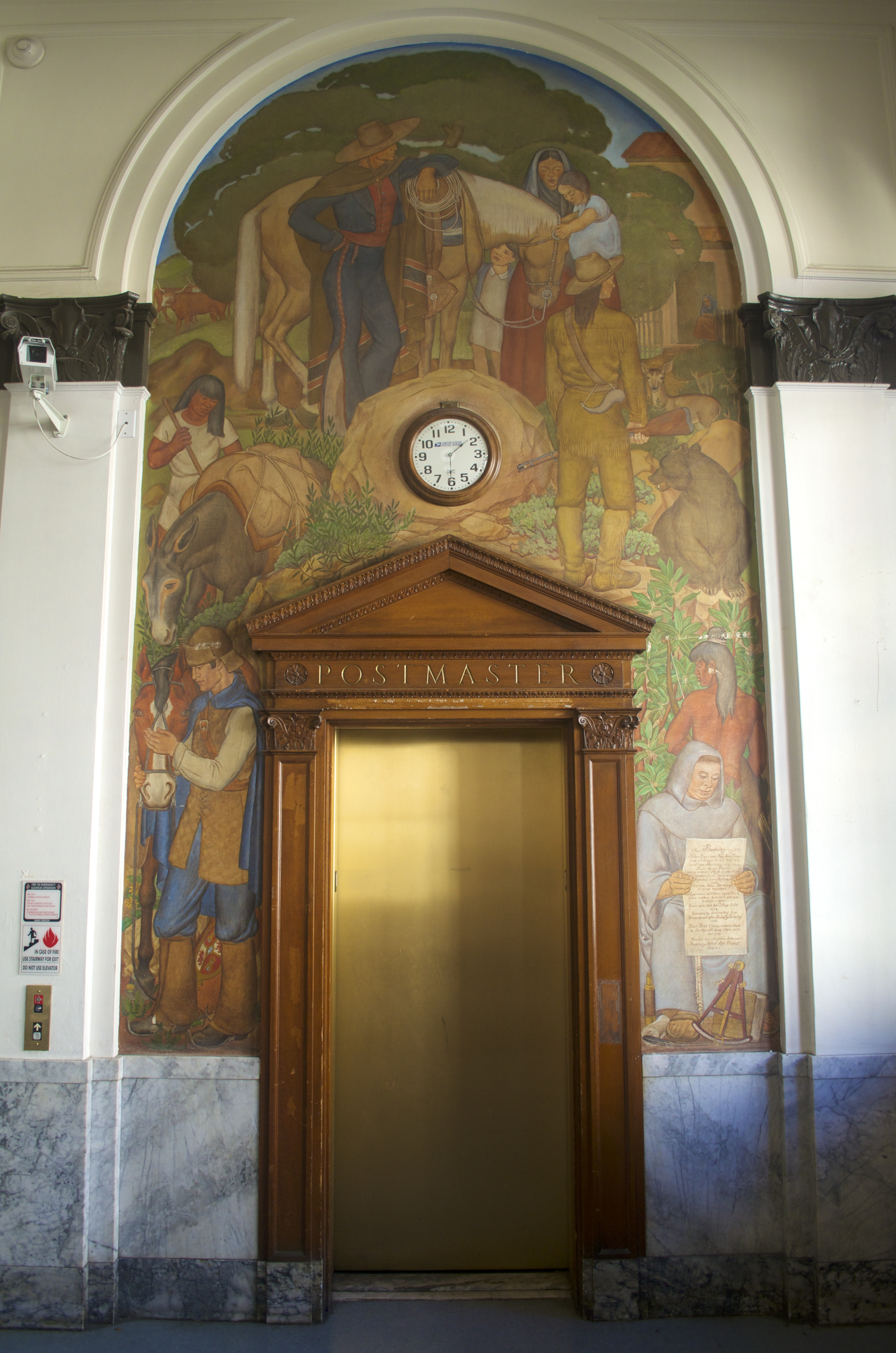
Susan Scheuer, Incidents in California History (1937), mural for the post office in Berkeley, California
