= Edward Bruce (New Deal) =

American artist and arts administrator

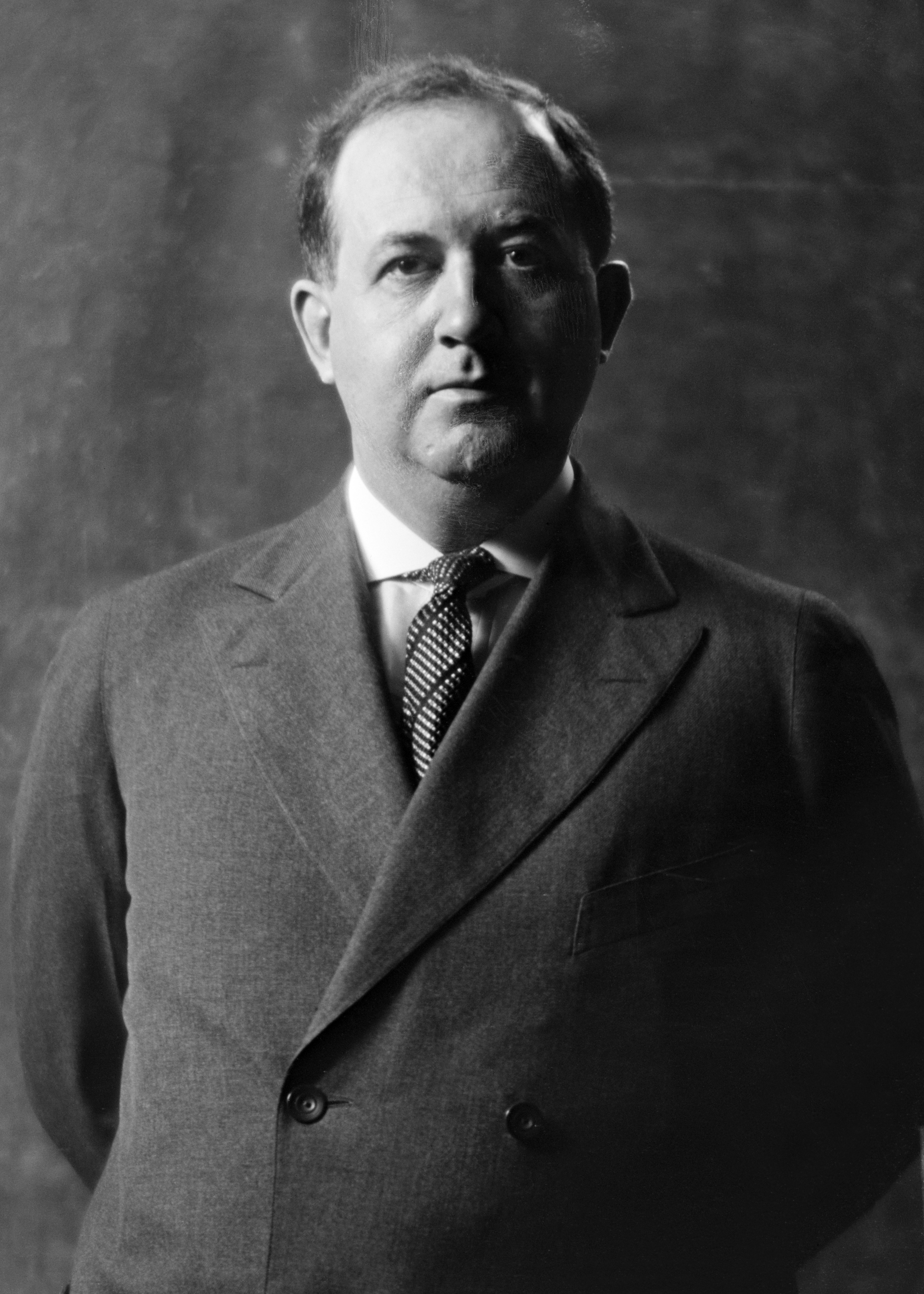
- Ned Bruce in 1919
- Born: Edward Bright Bruce; April 13, 1879; Dover Plains, New York, U.S.
- Died: January 26, 1943 (aged 63); Hollywood, Florida, U.S.
- Occupation: New Deal arts administrator
- Notable work: Public Works of Art Project; Section of Painting and Sculpture; Treasury Relief Art Project
- Spouse(s): Margaret Stow (married 1909–1943)

Edward Bright Bruce (April 13, 1879 – January 26, 1943) was the administrator of the New Deal art projects of the United States Department of the Treasury: the Public Works of Art Project (1933–1934), the Section of Painting and Sculpture (1934–1943), and the Treasury Relief Art Project (1935–1938). Ned Bruce was a successful lawyer and entrepreneur before giving up his business career altogether at the age of 43 to become an artist. However, like most artists during the Depression, he found it impossible to make a living making art, and he grudgingly returned to business as a lobbyist in Washington, D.C. In 1932 he joined the Treasury Department, where his expertise in monetary policy and art guided federal efforts to employ workers in the visual arts during the Great Depression in the United States.

== Biography ==
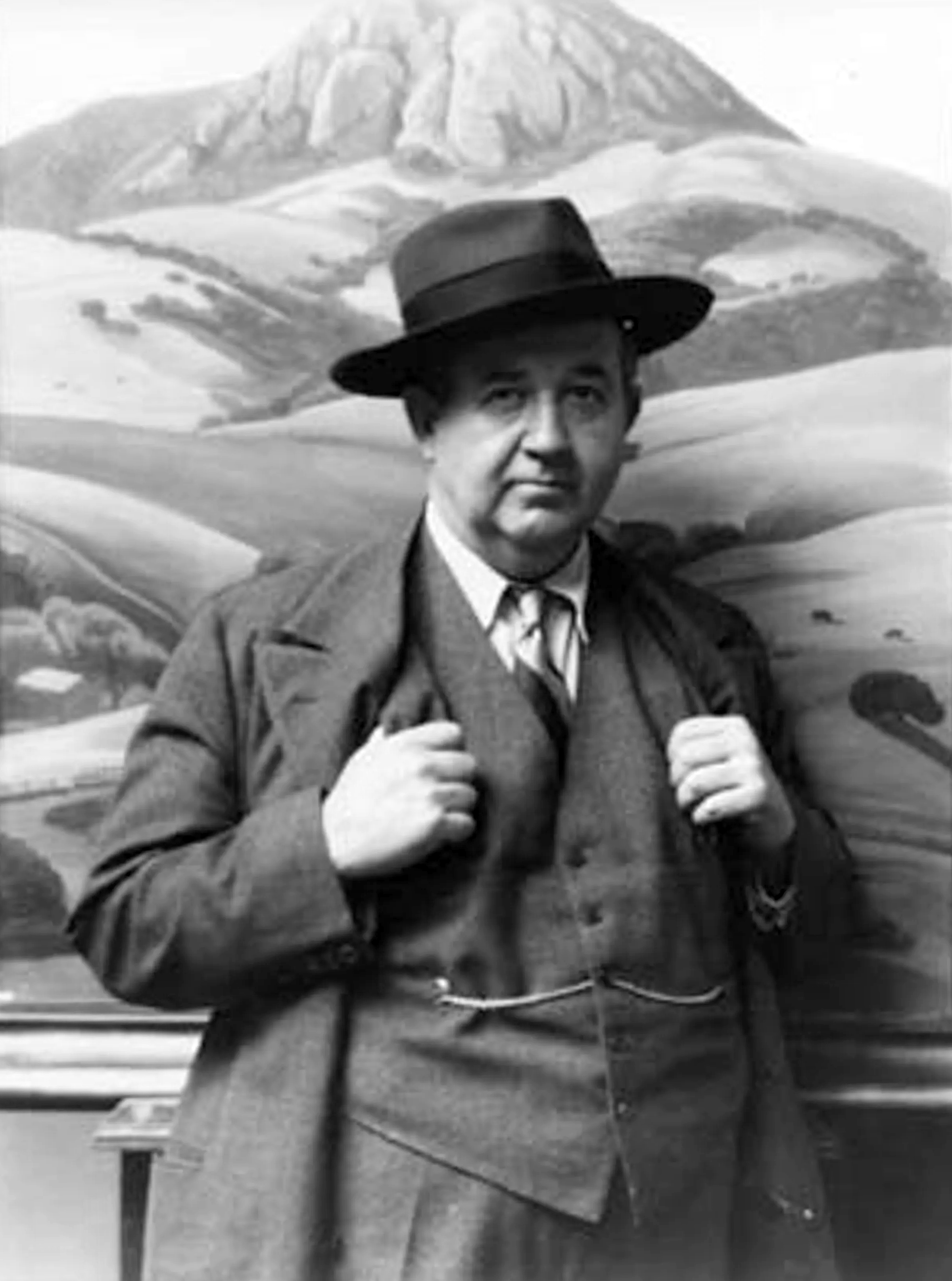
Bruce during his tenure as administrator of the Treasury Department art projects

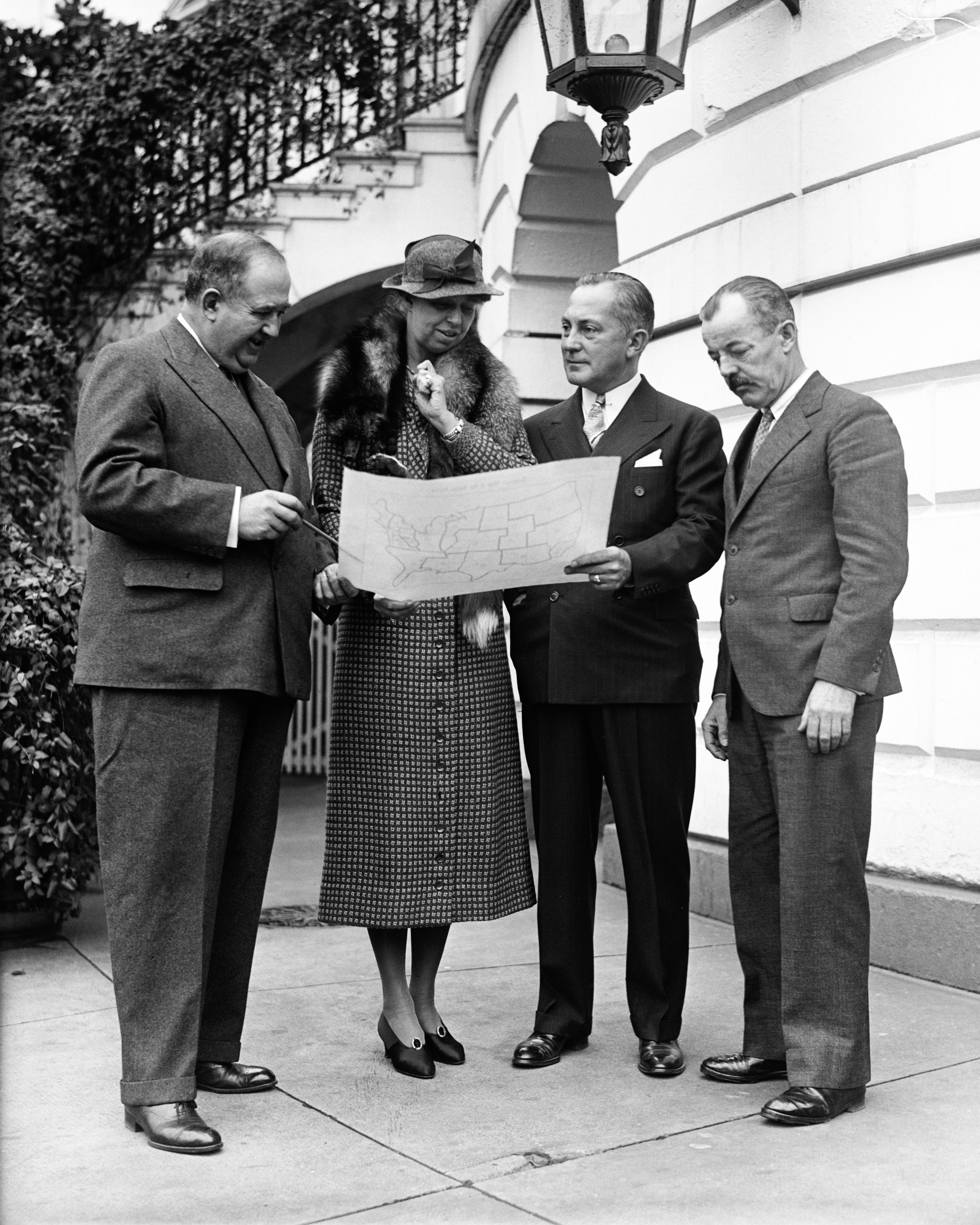
Bruce, Eleanor Roosevelt, Assistant Secretary of the Treasury L. W. Robert Jr., and Forbes Watson look at a map of the Public Works of Art Project's 16 U.S. regions after the project was announced in December 1933.

Edward Bright Bruce was born in Dover Plains, New York, on April 13, 1879, the son of a Baptist minister. He began painting at the age of 14. He graduated from Columbia Law School in 1904 with high honors. He began practicing law in New York City and Manila in the Philippines with the law firm of Bruce, Lawrence, Ross and Block. While working in Manila, he bought and ran The Manila Times, a popular daily newspaper. In 1915 he changed his focus to banking and trade throughout China and the Far East with a company he created, the Pacific Development Corporation.

Throughout this time Bruce continued painting and collecting art, particularly Chinese art. In 1922, he ended his business career and moved to Italy to study art with the American painter and sculptor Maurice Sterne. He left Italy in 1929 because of the oppressive Fascist conditions, and moved to California. His landscape paintings, which were influenced by the Chinese works in his collection, were featured in a number of one-person shows with excellent reviews in Paris, New York, and San Francisco.

Despite his acclaim as an artist, Bruce was unable to sell any artwork after the start of the Depression, and returned to a career in business. In the winter of 1932 he came to Washington to lobby on behalf of the Calamba Sugar Estate of San Francisco, which had interests in the Philippines. He cultivated good relations with Washington officials, and joined the Treasury Department in 1932 as an expert on monetary policy.

In 1933, President Franklin D. Roosevelt received a letter from the American painter George Biddle, who suggested a New Deal program that would hire artists to paint murals in federal office buildings. Roosevelt was intrigued by the idea, and brought the idea to the Treasury Department, which oversaw all construction of federal buildings. Bruce was asked to help plan and organize the effort.

In December 1933, Bruce was appointed administrator of the first federally supported arts program, the Public Works of Art Project. He was given the task of organizing the work-relief project that employed professional artists to create sculptures, paintings, crafts and design for public buildings and parks during the Depression. It was an emergency program that was not given strict relief testing. In its six months of existence, the Public Works of Art Project employed about 3,700 artists, spending about $1,312,000.

In October 1934, the Treasury Department created the Section of Painting and Sculpture (later named the Section of Fine Arts, and usually called simply the Section) under Bruce's leadership. It was not a work-relief program, but rather a program that commissioned paintings and sculptures for new federal buildings—most notably post offices and court houses—through open competitions. The project continued until 1943, after awarding some 1,400 contracts to artists at a cost of $2,571,000.

Administered by the Section under Bruce, the Treasury Relief Art Project was created in July 1935. The Works Progress Administration allocated funds for the work-relief employment of Federal Art Project artists to assist in the creation of artworks for existing federal buildings. TRAP employed 446 people, including 275 artists, 75 percent of them on relief. The total project cost was $833,784 and operated until 1939.

In 1935, Bruce was elected into the National Academy of Design as an associate member. FDR appointed him to the U.S. Commission of Fine Arts in 1940; he served until 1943.

Bruce died January 26, 1943, in Hollywood, Florida, after a brief illness.

== Honors and accolades ==
A Liberty ship, the SS Edward Bruce, was named in Bruce's honor. The ship was christened by his widow November 8, 1943, at the Bethlehem Fairfield Shipyard of Baltimore.

== Paintings ==
Bruce was a prominent landscape painter whose work was shown in leading U.S. galleries and museums and purchased by the government of France. Seven of his canvases are in the collection of the Smithsonian American Art Museum:

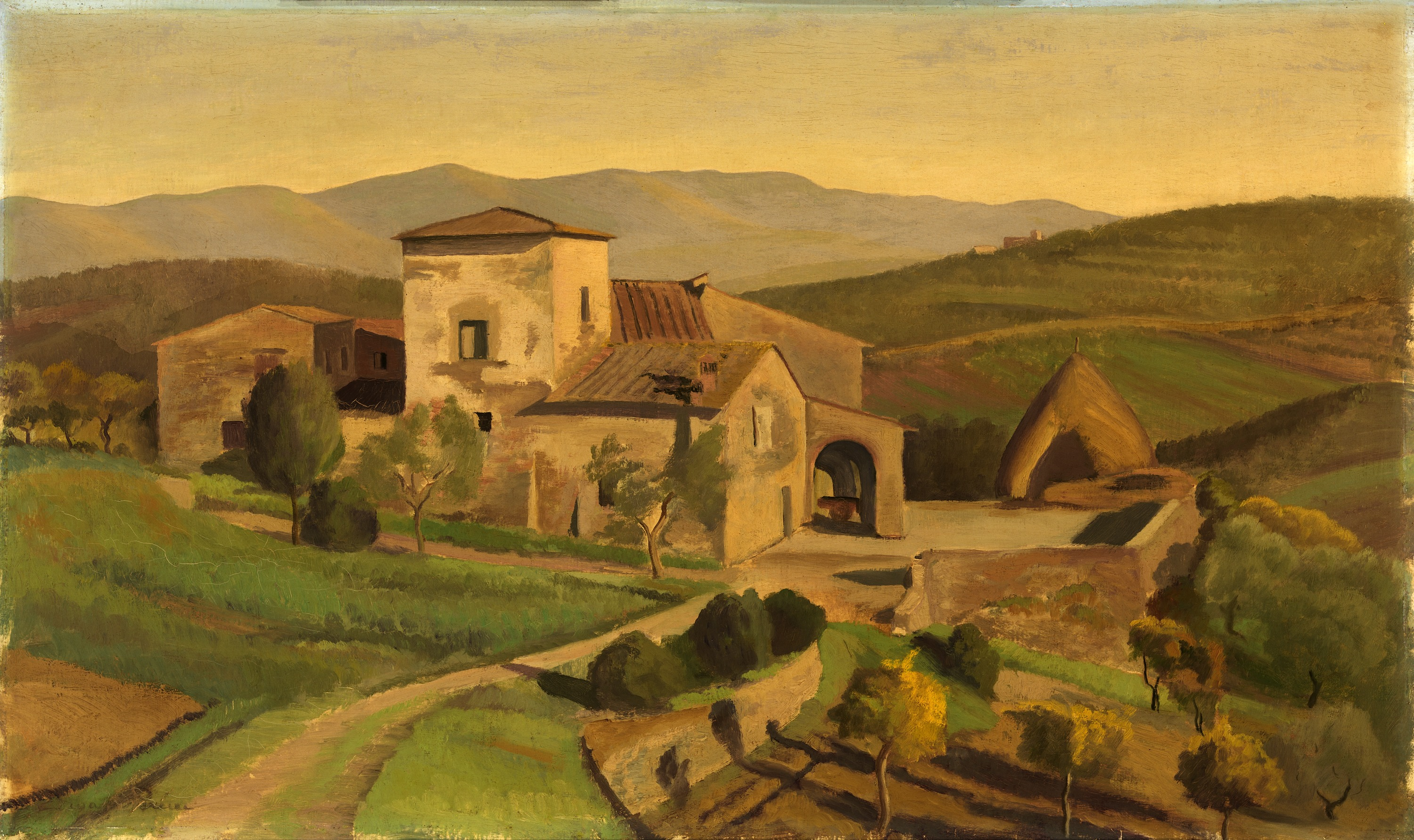
A Tuscan Farm (c. 1926–1931)

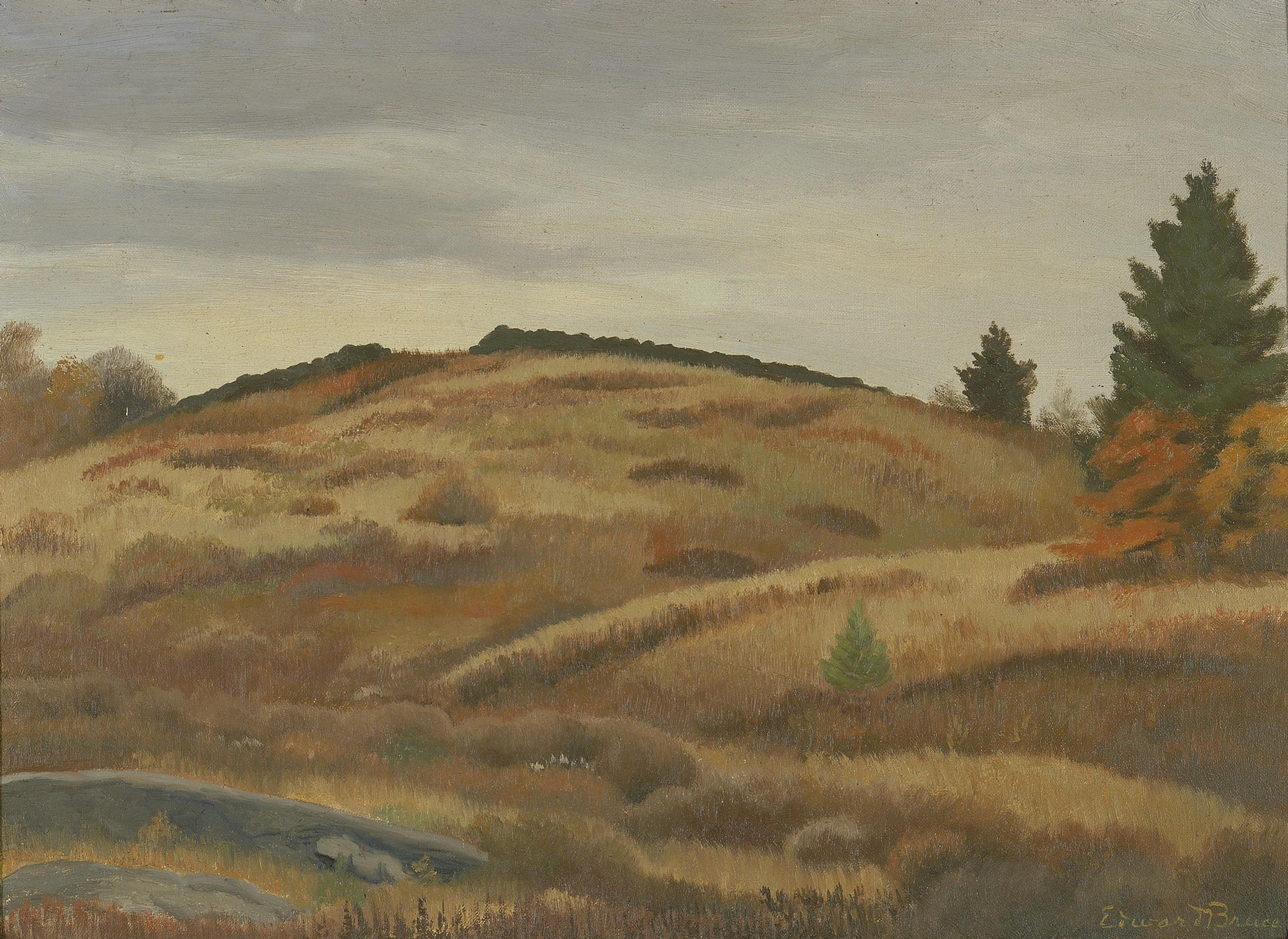
Autumn Fields (c. 1926–1934)

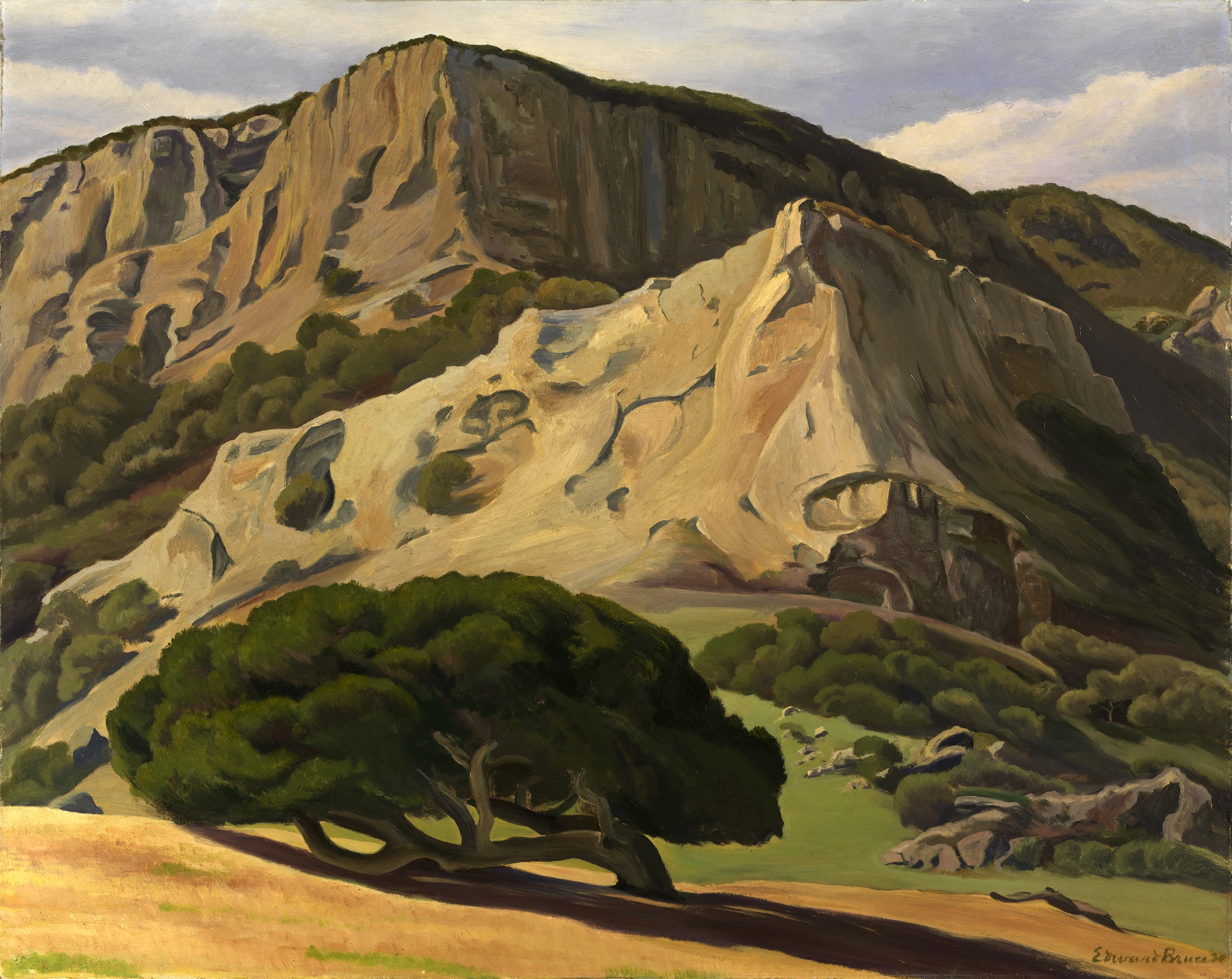
Oaks and Rocks—San Luis Obispo (1930)

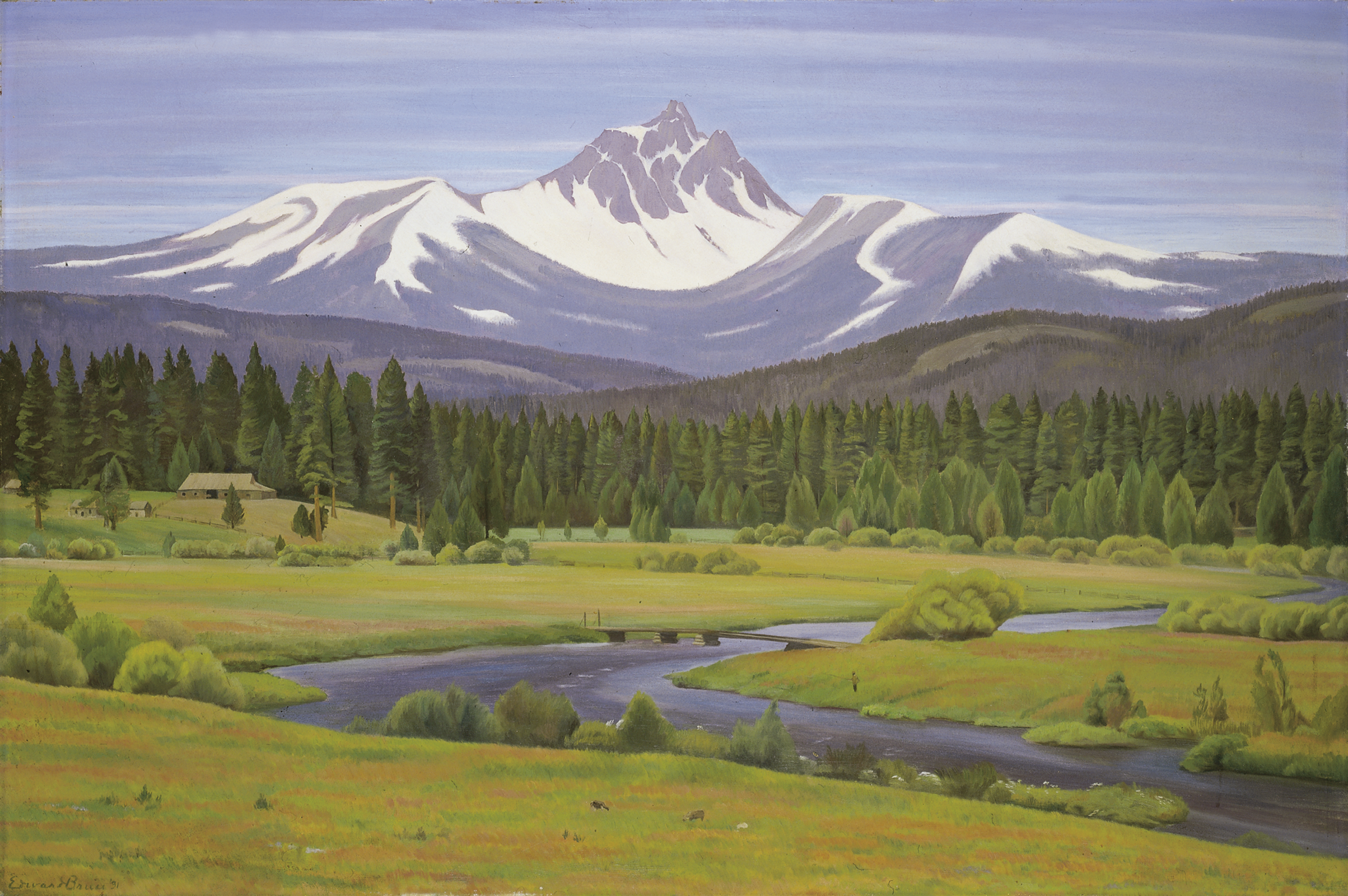
In the Cascade Mountains (1931)

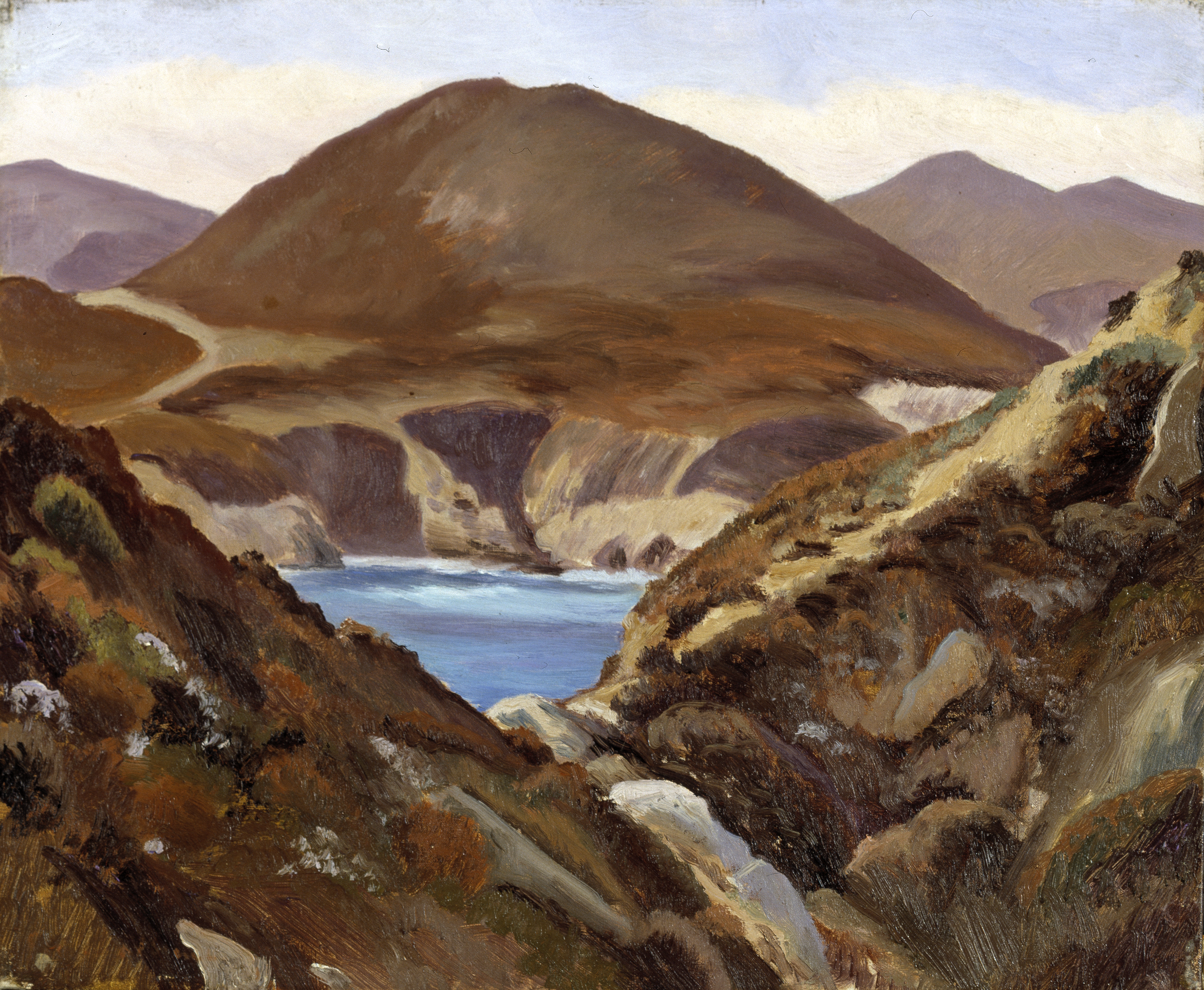
Yankee Point (c. 1931–1933)

Bluemont Farm (c. 1932–1937)

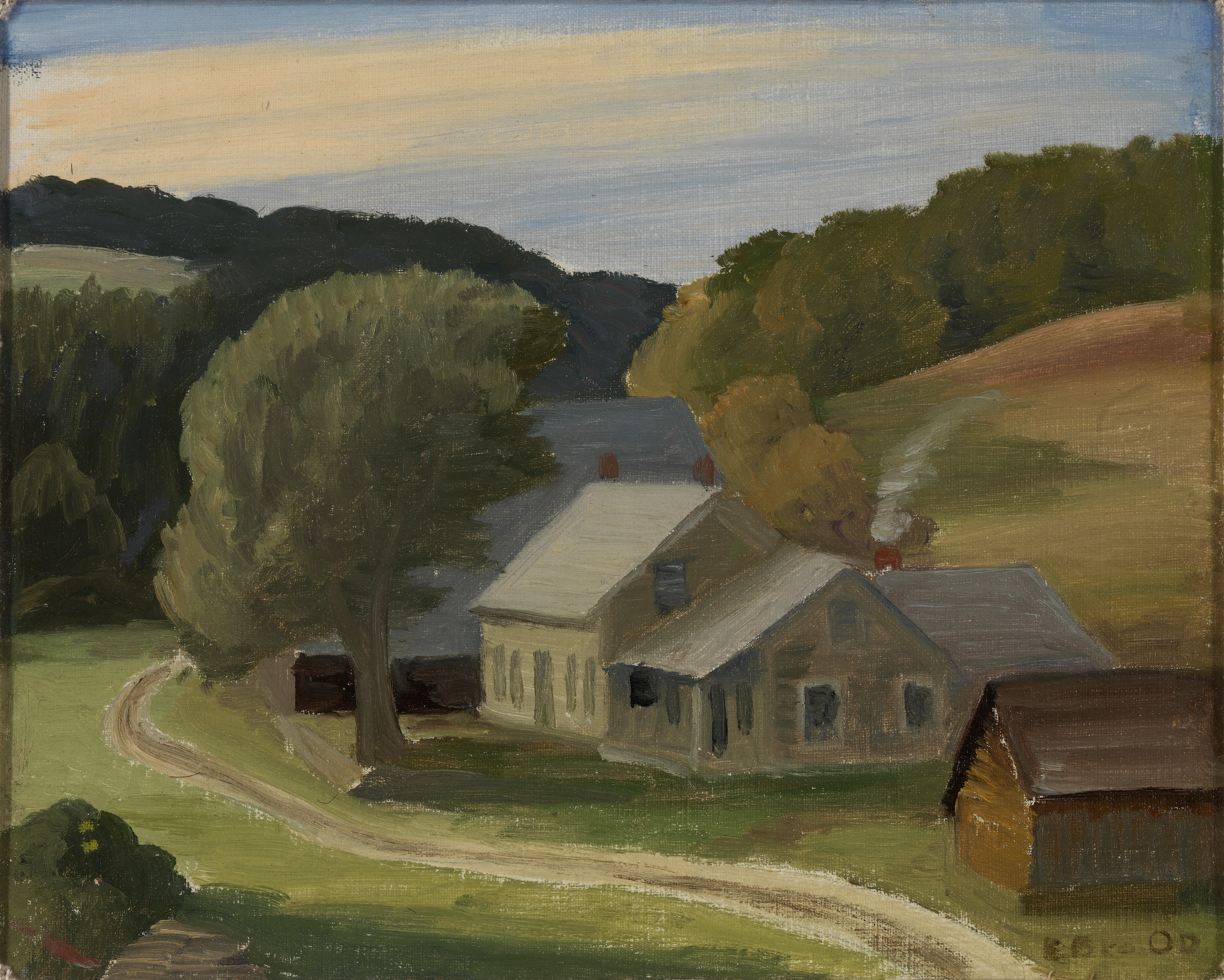
Landscape (1934)
