= William B. Van Ingen =

American painter

William Brantley Van Ingen (1858–1955) was a stained glass artist and painter perhaps best known for his Panama Canal murals.

== Life ==
Van Ingen was born in Philadelphia. He was a student of Christian Schuessele and Thomas Eakins at the Pennsylvania Academy of the Fine Arts in Philadelphia, before moving to New York City, where he apprenticed under noted stained glass artists John La Farge, Francis Lathrop, and Lewis C. Tiffany. Van Ingen was also known for his abilities in mural painting, particularly for the work he did for the Library of Congress in Washington, D.C., the U.S. Mint in Philadelphia, the Federal Building in Indianapolis, Indiana and the Panama Canal Authority.

== Panama Canal murals ==
Of the murals, Van Ingen said, "I tried to compose into one picture the views to be seen from different standpoints, but united in the mind. It enabled me to combine different periods of time in the construction work." He also said, "[a]ny success the paintings may have had, came, I believe, from an endeavor to see with the eyes of the man in the ditch."
