= Xavier J. Barile =

American artist (1891–1981)

- Born: March 18, 1891; Tufo, Italy
- Died: October 12, 1981 (aged 90); New York City
- Education: Cooper Union, Art Students League
- Known for: Paintings, monotypes, drawings, teaching
- Movement: Ashcan School, American Realism
- Spouse: Lolita de Silva

Xavier J. Barile (b. Saverio Barile) (March 18, 1891 – October 12, 1981) was an American painter, graphic artist, illustrator and art teacher born in Tufo, Italy. He worked in many mediums including oil, casein, watercolor, pen and ink, monotyping and etching creating figurative scenes, cityscapes, landscapes, seascapes and portraits. Always an avid sketcher, Barile also worked as a magazine and newspaper illustrator and cartoonist. As a painter Barile was strongly influenced by American Realism and the Ashcan School, but developed his own distinctive, somewhat more modern style of realism involving subtle contours and distortions of perspective.

== Early life and education ==
Xavier J. Barile was the oldest son in a family of six born on March 18, 1891, in the small town of Tufo, Italy, to Domenico and Carolina Barile. Domenico emigrated to New York City in 1905 to start a tailoring business and brought the family over two years later in 1907. For a while Barile worked in his father's shop to help get the family settled in their new life, but soon his love of sketching and drawing led him to enroll in evening art classes at the Cooper Union. After graduating there, he began studies at the Art Students League. Barile's early teachers and mentors included John Sloan, William de Leftwich Dodge, F. Luis Mora and Victor Perard.

== Career and associations ==
Barile was a gregarious and active member of the art scene wherever he found himself. He was a lifelong friend of John Sloan, Reginald Marsh, George Luks, Robert Henri and Everett Shinn. He was a member of the Salmagundi Club, the Society of Independent Artists, the American Monotype Society (now defunct), Audubon Artists, the New York Artists Equity Association, the National Art Education Association, the Art Students League (lifetime member) and more. Barile opened his first art school in 1919, the Barile Art School, on Lexington Avenue in New York City. He enjoyed teaching and continued to do so for the next 60 years in various locations.

In the 1920s Barile was a member of The Dialists, a group of artists which included his friend, the sculptor Leo Lentilli. During 1936 and 1937, Barile worked for the Treasury Relief Art Project, assisting Reginald Marsh with the murals of the Alexander Hamilton U.S. Custom House. Marsh and his assistants made multiple detailed field studies of American shipping in the New York City harbors before beginning the mural paintings on especially constructed scaffolding. Their wages were $1.60/hour.

Barile closed his art school in 1939 and relocated to Colorado. Upon the recommendation of his friend John Sloan for the post, Barile become the founder and Head of the Art Department at the Pueblo Junior College (which eventually morphed into Colorado State University, Pueblo). Pueblo was a base for Barile's excursions to New Mexico, Arizona and California, locations which inspired much of his monotype work and other southwestern themed paintings. Barile's numerous monotypes are considered some of his best work.

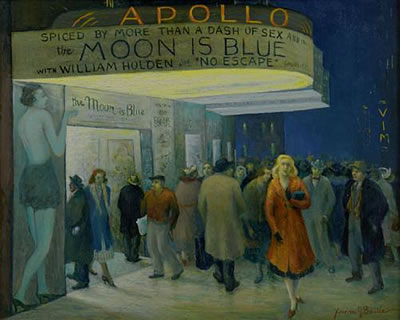
42nd St. Nocturne, oil on canvas board, 1953

Before returning to New York City in 1946, Barile was inspired by a year spent teaching and painting in St. Augustine, Florida, where he held classes at the St. Augustine Arts Club. In New York after short stints teaching at the Pan-American Art School and the Catan-Rose Institute of Art, Barile opened his second art school in 1950, the Barile Fine Arts Group, on Union Square in New York City. He continued to teach there until 1973.

Barile's papers are held at the Archives of American Art. Some of his work is in the Smithsonian American Art Museum.

== Personal life ==
Barile remained single until age 70 when he married his student, Maria Dolores Silva y Gordoa (1914–1994), who was 23 years younger than him. She preferred to use the name Lolita de Silva in both her personal and artistic life. It was the first marriage for both of them. The marriage lasted until 1979 when de Silva, who had suffered several nervous breakdowns, was taken back to Mexico by her family. Barile died two years later on October 12, 1981. De Silva died in 1994.

== Selected exhibitions ==
Exhibitions of Barile's work began in the 1920s and continued into the 1960s.

- Art Students League
- Audubon Artists Group Show (1950)
- American Monotype Society (traveling show, 1940-41)
- Denver Art Museum
- Museum of New Mexico (1944)
- National Academy of Design (1943)
- National Museum of American Art (1982) This is now the Smithsonian American Art Museum.
- Newark Art Museum (1951, as one of "The Dialists")
- Salmagundi Club (1954)
- Whitney Studio Club (1921)
