= United States Post Office (Oyster Bay, New York) =

- US Post Office--Oyster Bay
- U.S. National Register of Historic Places
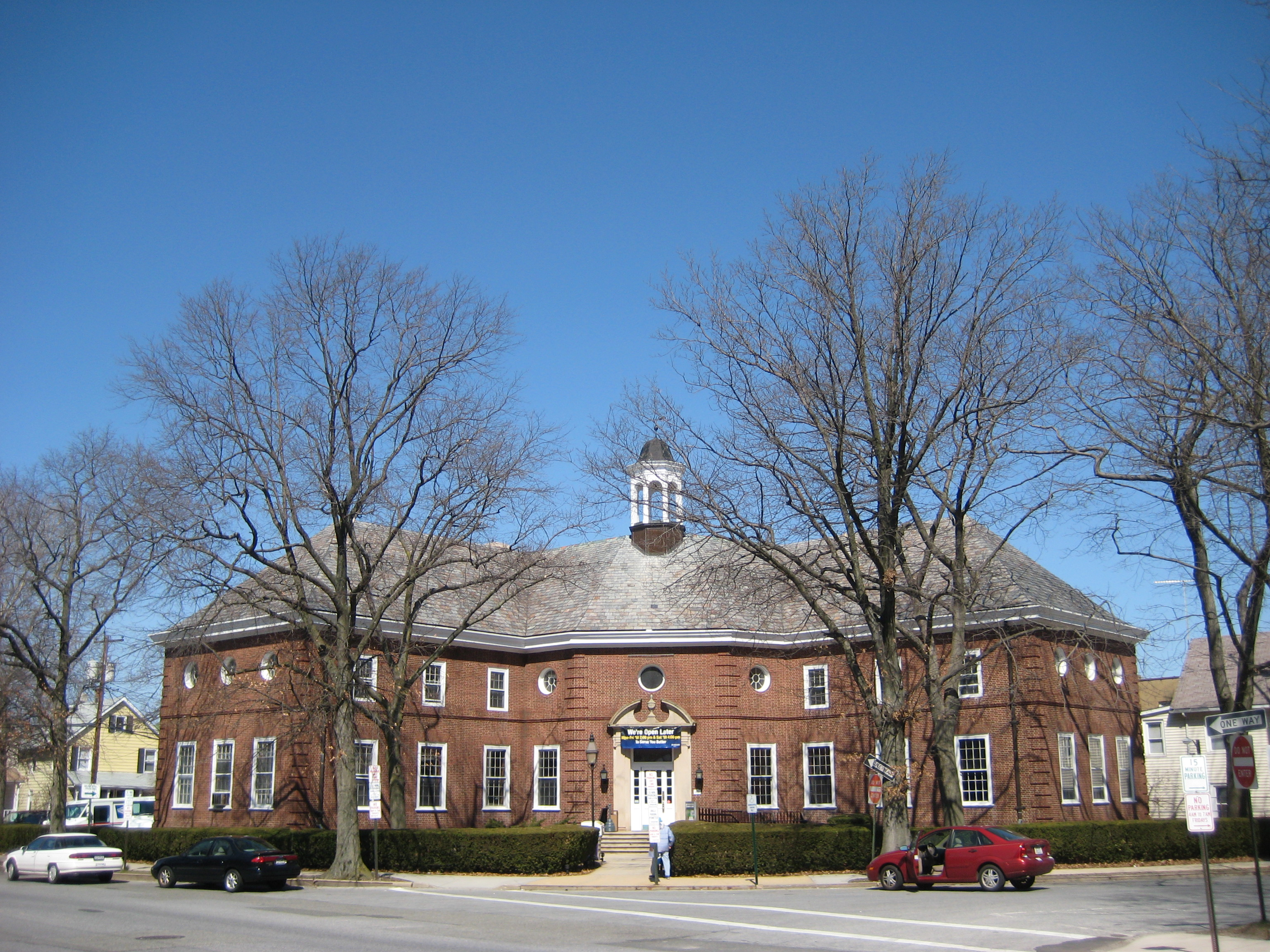

- Location within New York Location within the United States
- Location: Oyster Bay, New York
- Coordinates: 40°52′26.33″N 73°31′59.22″W
- Built: 1935
- Architect: Bottomley, Wagner & White; Peixotto, Ernest
- Architectural style: Colonial Revival
- MPS: US Post Offices in New York State, 1858-1943, TR
- NRHP reference No.: 88002393
- Added to NRHP: May 11, 1989

The Oyster Bay Post Office in Oyster Bay, New York was completed in 1936. New York architect William Bottomley designed this Colonial Revival structure to mirror the Oyster Bay Town Hall across the street. Inside are murals by the prominent American artist, illustrator and author Ernest Peixotto, depicting scenes in Oyster Bay from 1653 to 1936 when the Post Office was built. This building is listed on the National Register of Historic Places and featured on the Oyster Bay History Walk.

== History ==
The first Oyster Bay Post Office was located in Ezra Minor’s house on East Main Street around the year 1800. In subsequent years there were at least three other Post Office buildings in the village of Oyster Bay. This building was completed in 1936 with a focus on art and architecture. New York architect William Bottomley designed this Colonial Revival structure to be a mirror image of the Town Hall building it opposes, and he hired two prominent artists to adorn it with historical murals and sculptures. The work was created under the Treasury Relief Art Project.

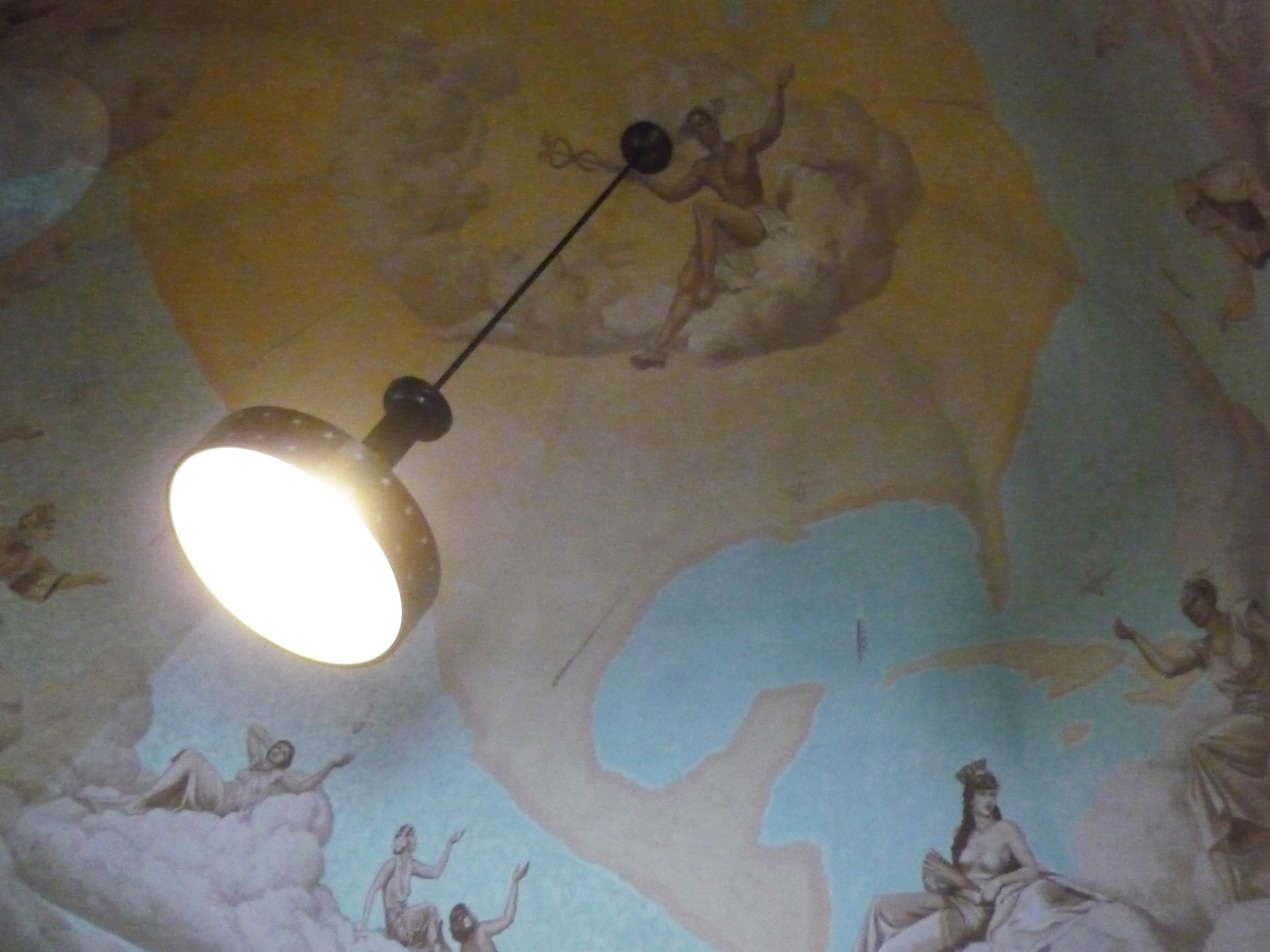
Detail of Arthur Sturges ceiling in Oyster Bay U.S. Post Office, 2008

The prominent American artist illustrator and author Ernest Peixotto was commissioned to paint five murals which are in themselves, a tour of historic Oyster Bay, depicting scenes from 1653 to 1936. The vaulted ceiling was painted by Peixotto assistant, Arthur Sturges and depicts beautiful women representing different countries sending mail to North America on ships and planes. Mercury, the winged messenger, sits atop the dome to receive the mail with speed.

Leo Lentelli, a noted Italian sculptor, whose work can be seen throughout America on public buildings created the terracotta panels above the interior doorways, depicting the continents symbolized by animals. On the Africa/Oceania panel the dates 1858 and 1919 refer to the years of Theodore Roosevelt's life. On the Asia/America panel the date 1902 refers to the year Roosevelt returned to Oyster Bay as President and the year 1936, the year the Post Office was built.

Lentelli also sculpted the bust of Theodore Roosevelt as well as a stunning stone flagpole base on the grounds outside the Post Office. After the block of stone was put in place, Lentelli had a wood shack built around it and spent the winter of 1936 carving the beautiful seahorses, dolphins, and shells you see today.

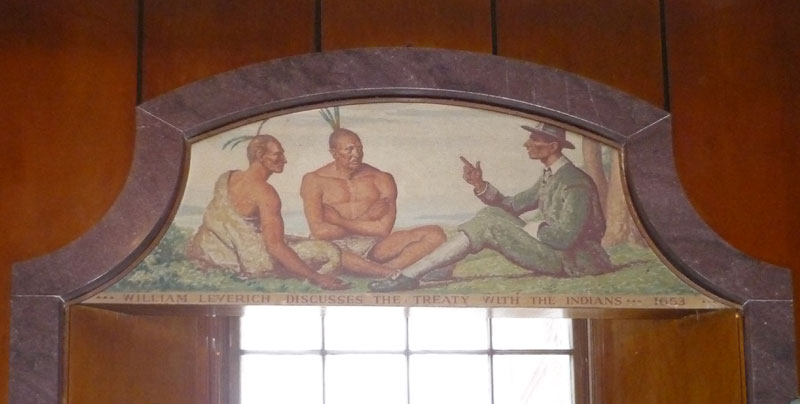
William Leverich discusses the treaty with the Indians, 1653.

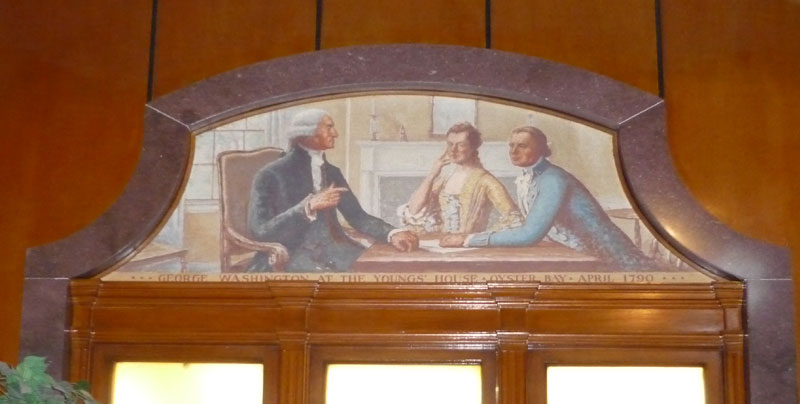
George Washington at the Youngs' House Oyster Bay, 1790.

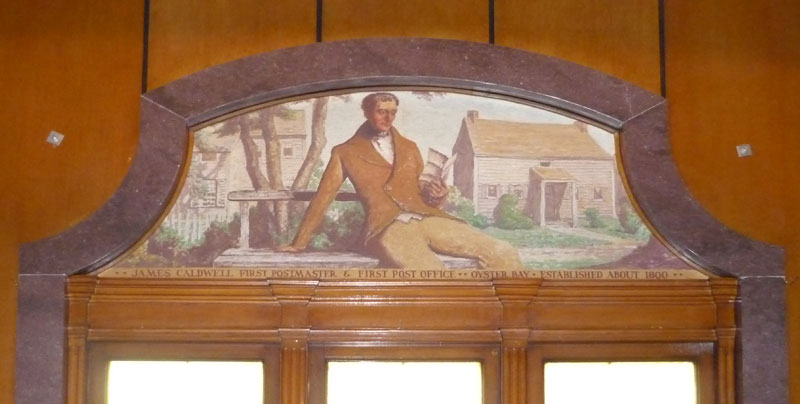
James Caldwell, First Postmaster and First Post Office, Oyster Bay, established about 1800.

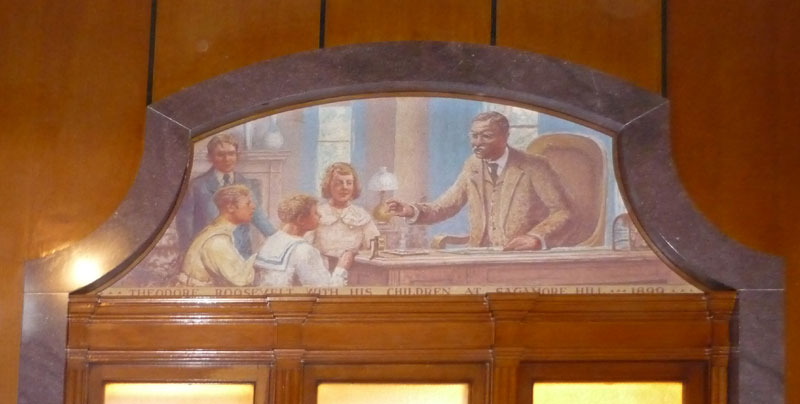
Theodore Roosevelt with his children at Sagamore Hill, 1899.

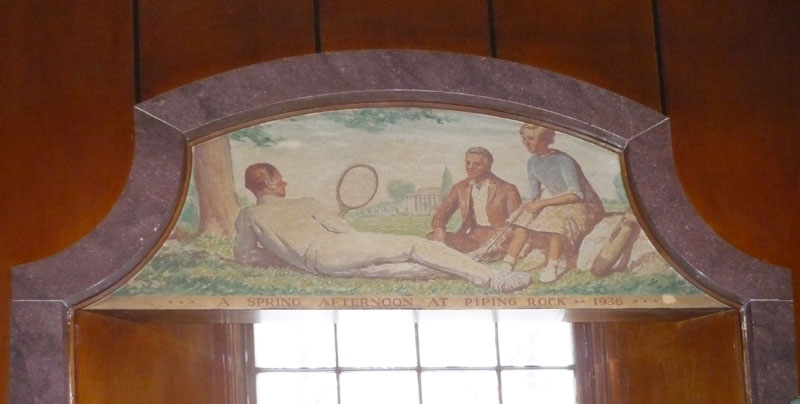
Spring afternoon at Piping Rock, 1936.

== See also ==
- Oyster Bay History Walk
- List of Town of Oyster Bay Landmarks
- National Register of Historic Places listings in Nassau County, New York
