= Lloyd Lozes Goff =

American painter

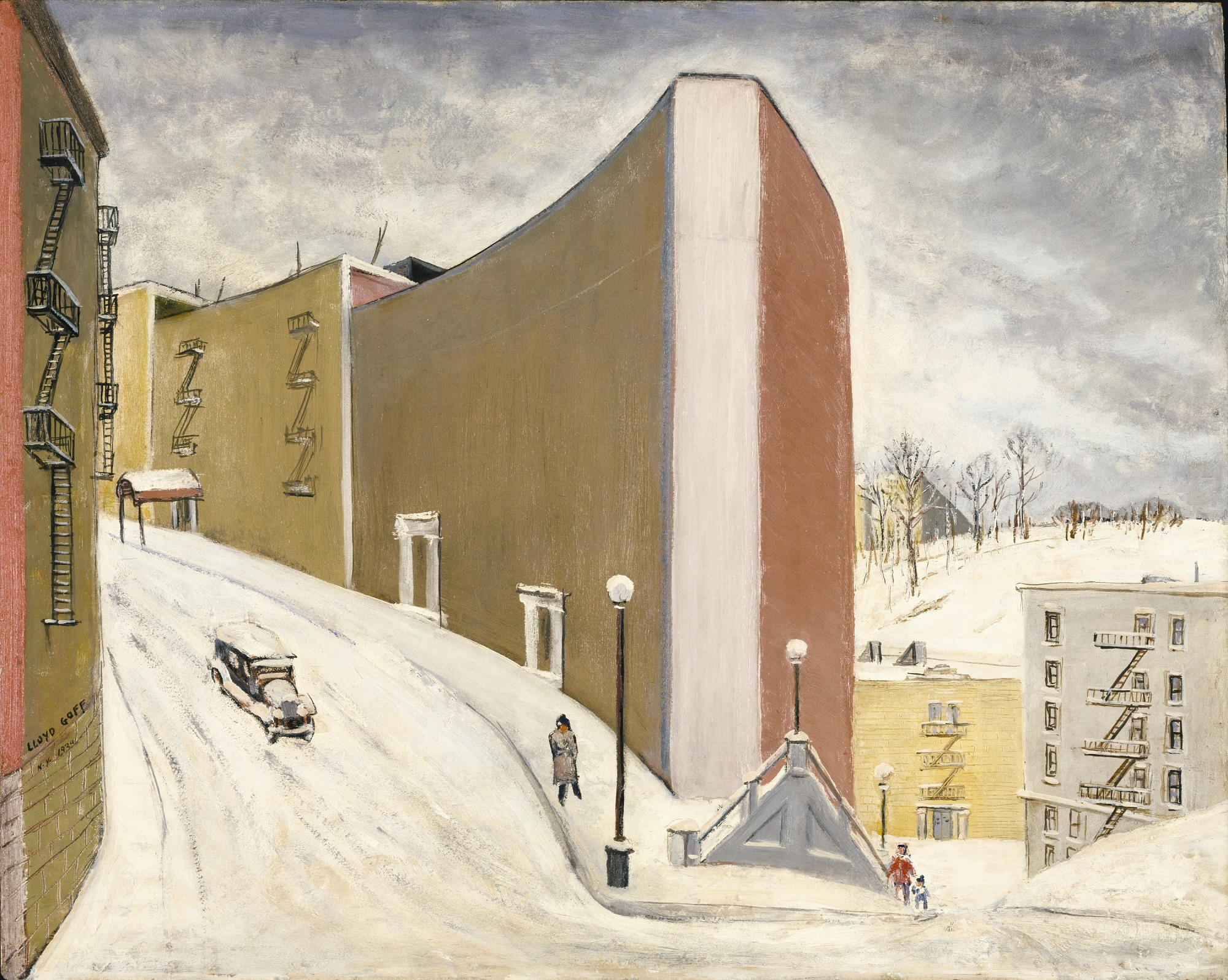
Suburban Apartments (1934), easel painting for the Public Works of Art Project in New York City

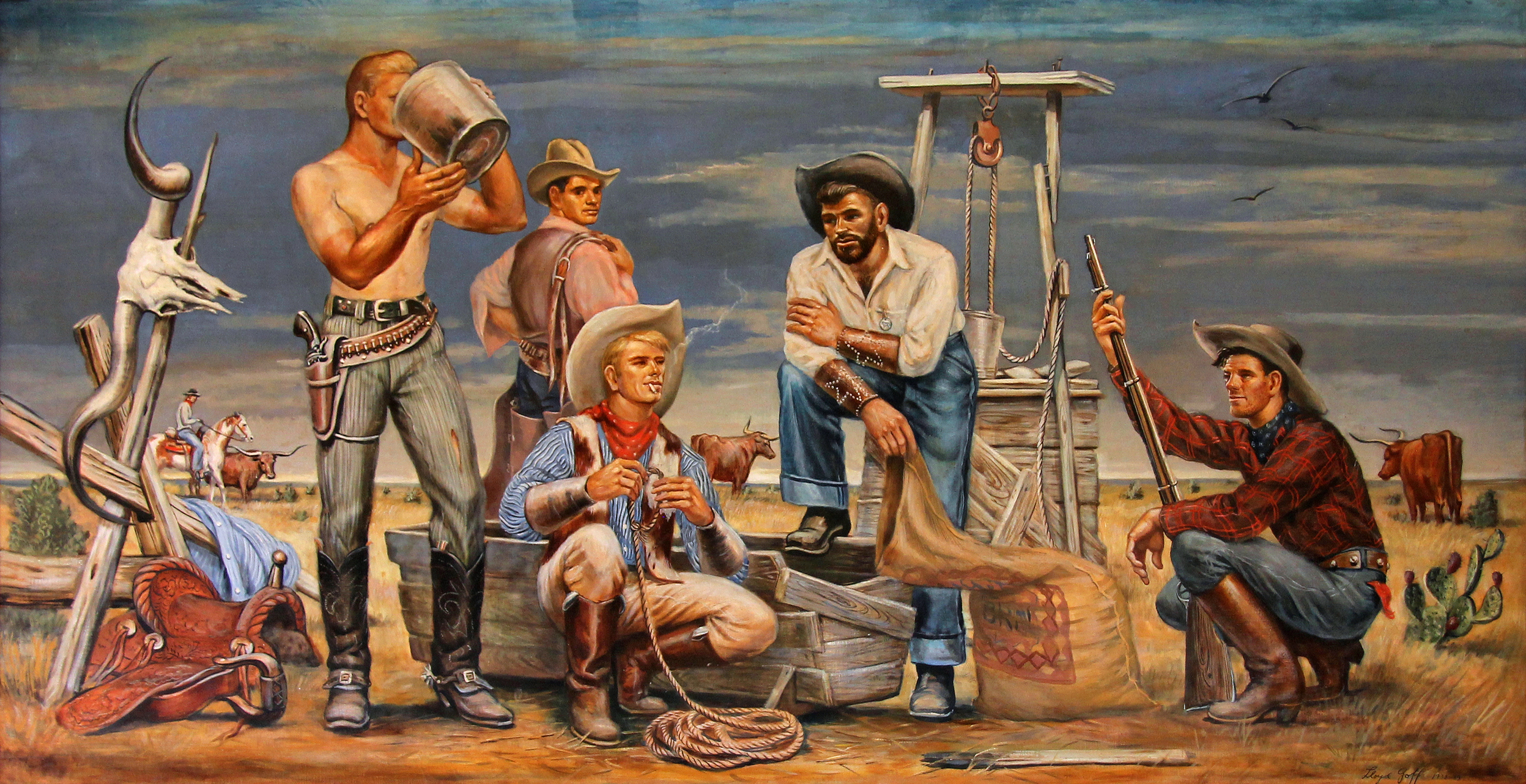
Before the Fencing of Delta County (1939), post office mural in Cooper, Texas

Lloyd Lozes Goff (1917–1982) was an American painter. Goff was born in 1917 in Dallas, Texas. He studied at the Art Students League and the University of New Mexico. His academic work at the University of New Mexico led to his becoming Assistant Professor of Art and Acting Head of the Art Department from 1944 to 1947. He illustrated two books published in 1949, New Mexico Village Arts and Golden Footlight's. He also wrote and illustrated two children's books about migratory birds, Run, Sandpiper, Run and Fly, Redwing, Fly.

His works were exhibited at the Carnegie Institute, the Whitney Museum of American Art, National Academy of Design, Pennsylvania Academy of Fine Arts, the Art Institute of Chicago, the 1939 World's Fair in New York, San Francisco Art Association, the New Mexico Museum of Art, and the Dallas Museum of Fine Arts. His works are located at the Library of Congress, Whitney Museum of American Art, Museum of Modern Art, New Mexico Museum of Art and the Dallas Museum of Fine Arts. His works are also on display at the Federal Buildings in Cooper, Texas, and Hollis, Oklahoma, as well as the U.S. Treasury, New York City Municipal Building, Southern Methodist University in Dallas, the U.S. Customs House in New York City, and the U.S. Embassy in Ottawa, Ontario, Canada.
