= Section of Painting and Sculpture =

U.S. governmental art project (1934–1943)

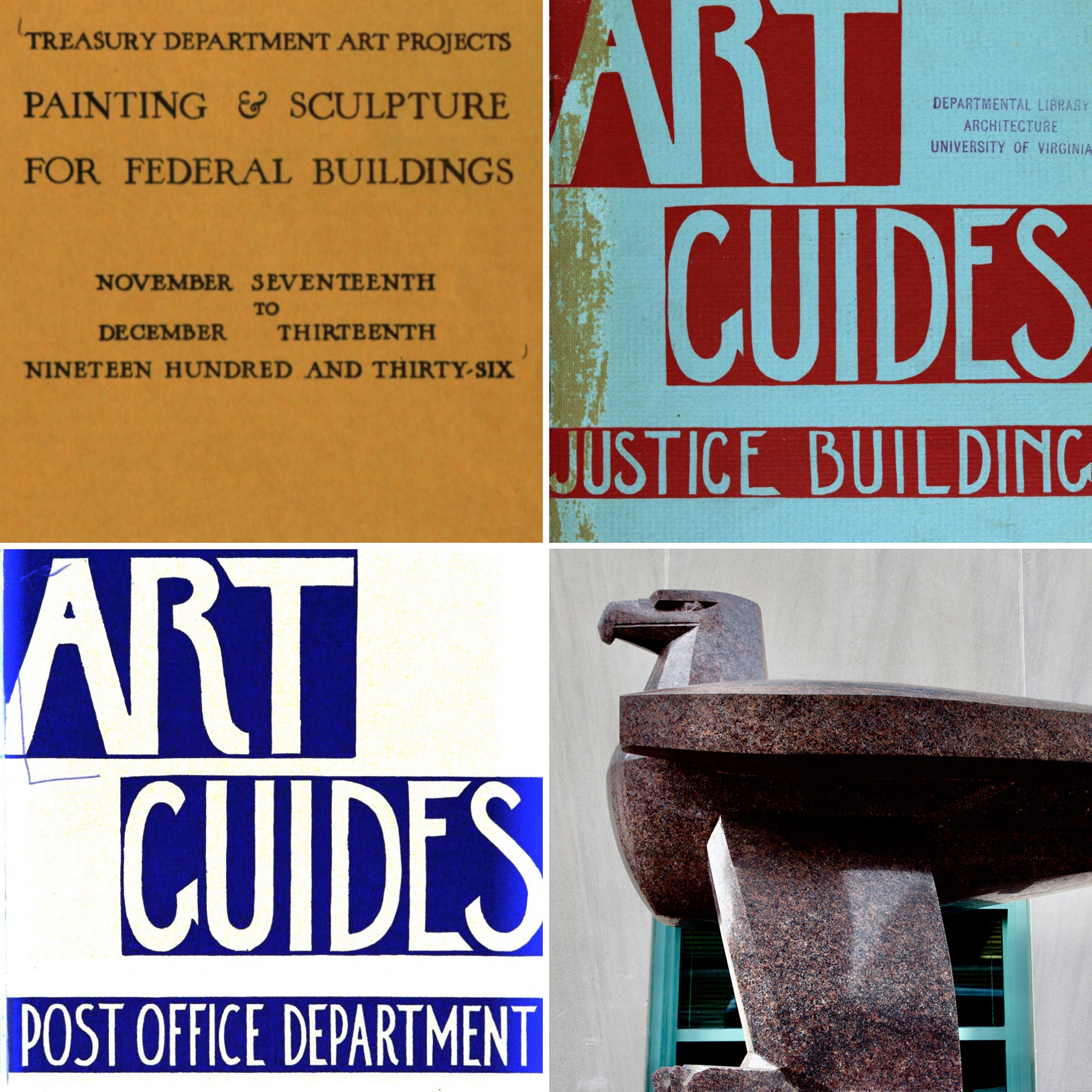
- American federal building art projects

Agency overview
- Formed: 1934
- Dissolved: 1943
- Parent agency: United States Department of the Treasury
- Child agency: Treasury Relief Art Project

The Treasury Section of Painting and Sculpture was a New Deal art project established on October 16, 1934, and administered by the Procurement Division of the United States Department of the Treasury.

Commonly known as the Section, it was renamed the Section of Fine Arts in 1939. Its primary mission was the embellishment of public buildings — including many United States post offices — through site-specific murals and sculptures commissioned on a competitive basis. The program all but ceased to operate in 1942, and was officially terminated on July 15, 1943.

== Overview ==
Like the Works Progress Administration (WPA), the Section was part of a government project aimed at providing work for Americans throughout the Great Depression during the 1930s. The Section's main function was to select high-quality art to decorate public buildings in the form of murals, making art accessible to all people. Because post offices were usually visited by everyone, they were the places selected to display these projects. Commissioned artists were provided with the guidelines and themes for each project, and scenes of local interest and events were generally represented. The muralist movement was inspired by the Mexican muralists, but Section murals did not portray the harsh social or economic realities of the time. Rather, they celebrated historical events and courageous acts. Many of these murals have disappeared, or fallen into disrepair, and others have been restored thanks to renewed interest in their historical and artistic significance. Painters of these murals include Ralf Henricksen, Henrietta Shore, and Suzanne Scheuer.

In existence during the Great Depression in the United States, the Section of Painting and Sculpture was a public-art program administered by the Procurement Division of the Treasury Department as part of President Franklin D. Roosevelt's New Deal. Like other New Deal public-art programs, the Section (as it was commonly called) was designed to increase employment among artists, but it was unusual in awarding commissions competitively, based on artistic talent. In total, the Section commissioned more than 1,300 murals and 300 sculptures, many of which were placed in post offices throughout the United States.

== Creation ==
The Section was created in 1934 and led by Edward Bruce. Bruce had also led the Treasury Department's Public Works of Art Project, the first federal art program, created in 1933 after American painter George Biddle suggested the idea to President Roosevelt. Other federal art programs followed, including the Federal Art Project (created in 1935 by the WPA, an independently operating federal agency) and the Treasury Relief Art Project (created in 1935 with funds granted by the WPA to the Treasury Department). The Section of Painting and Sculpture was renamed as the Section of Fine Arts in 1939 and operated until 1942.

The Section’s primary objective was to "secure suitable art of the best quality available for the embellishment of public buildings." Artworks created under the Section of Fine Arts were site-specific murals and sculptures for newly constructed federal buildings and post offices. About 1% of the costs of each new federal building was set aside to fund the program. Despite being categorized as “work-relief,” Section of Fine Arts commissions were chosen by anonymous competition and awarded government contracts “as in any other government job.” Between 1934 and 1938, the Section awarded 375 contracts worth $537,000.

== Art ==
Unlike the other New Deal art programs, the Section awarded commissions through competitions and paid artists a lump sum for their work. Competitions were open to all artists, regardless of economic status, and artists' proposals were reviewed without identifying the name of the artist who had made the submission.

The Section sought entries that reflected local interests and events, and the Section encouraged the artists to think of the communities, not the Section, as the artists' "patron." Indeed, artists awarded commissions were encouraged to visit the community to ensure that their murals reflected the community. Although many of the artists did not make such visits, artists commonly corresponded with the town (as well as the Post Office Department and the Section). Some local communities rejected the approved designs, and the artists would work to respond to these concerns and save their commissions.

The program also encouraged artists to reflect the building’s function. For example, the now-William Jefferson Clinton Federal Building, constructed in the early 1930s as the headquarters for the U.S. Post Office Department and one of the first buildings to receive works of art under this program, contains 25 murals created with support from the Section intended to depict the history of mail delivery and the settlement of the American West. These murals have been the subject of complaints about stereotypes of women, Native Americans, African Americans, and rural Americans, which were addressed by the General Services Administration.

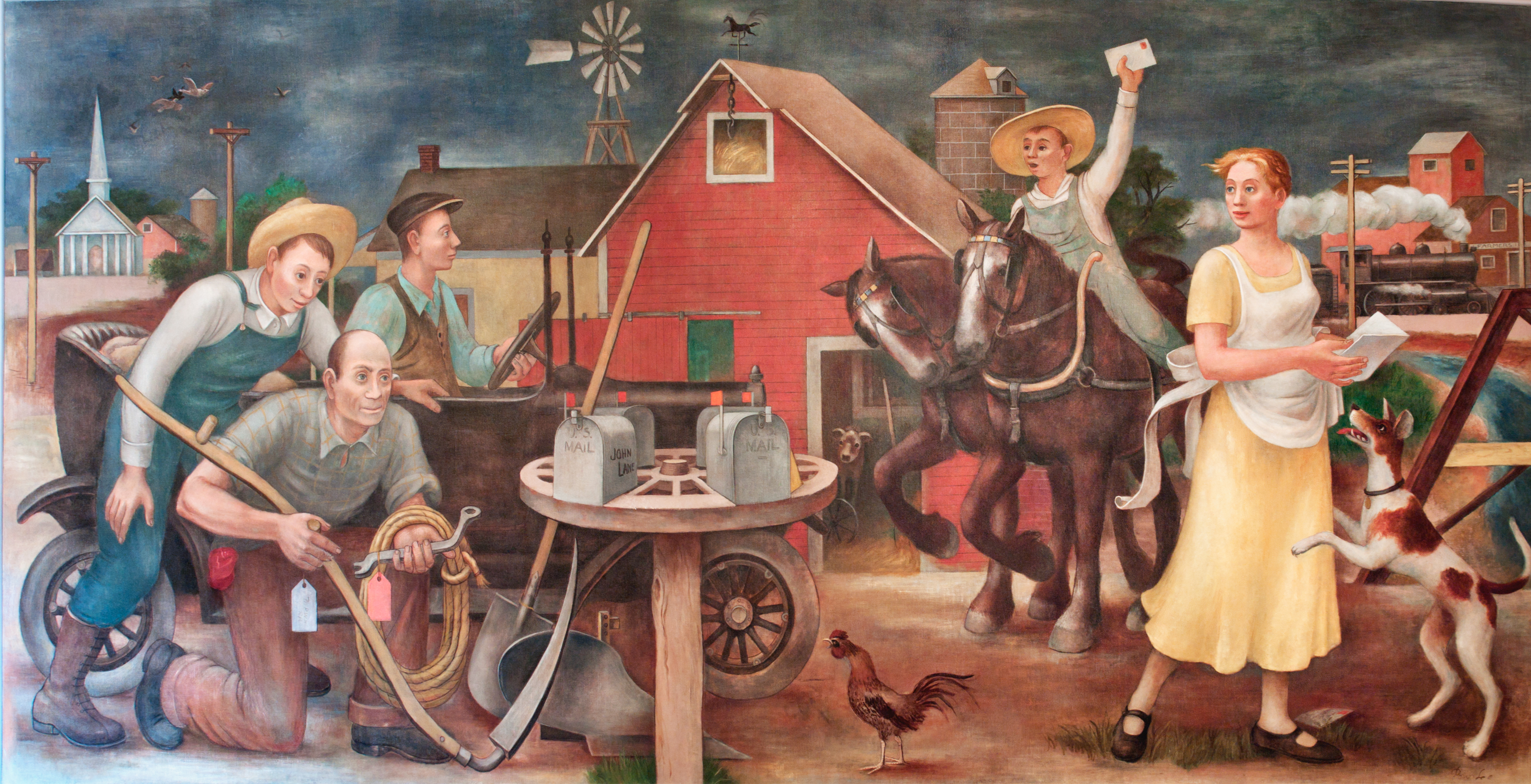
Country Post (1938), mural by Doris Lee for the Clinton Federal Building

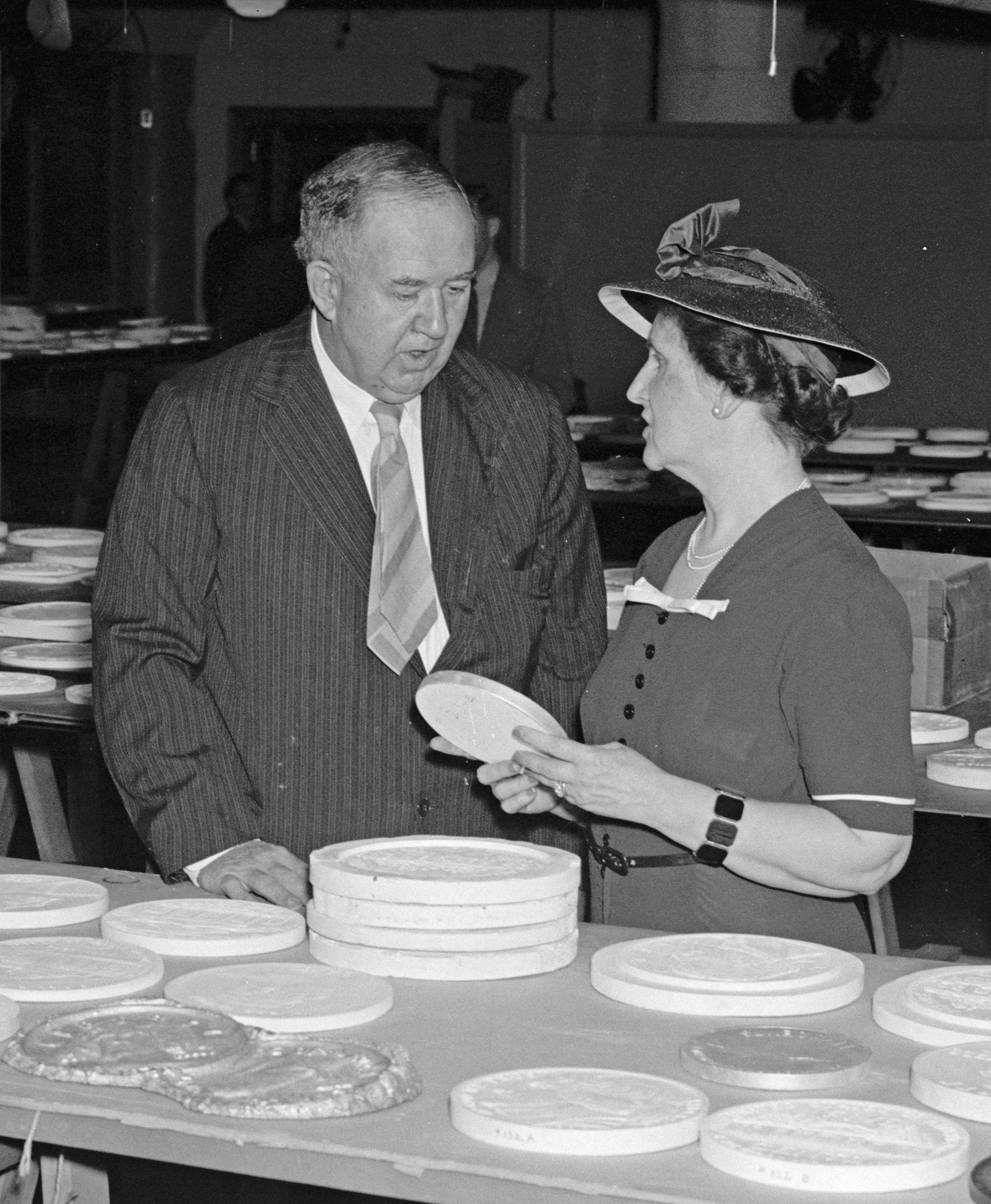
Edward Bruce (left) and Nellie Tayloe Ross of the United States Mint inspect candidates for the design of the new Jefferson nickel, a competition conducted by the Section (1938)

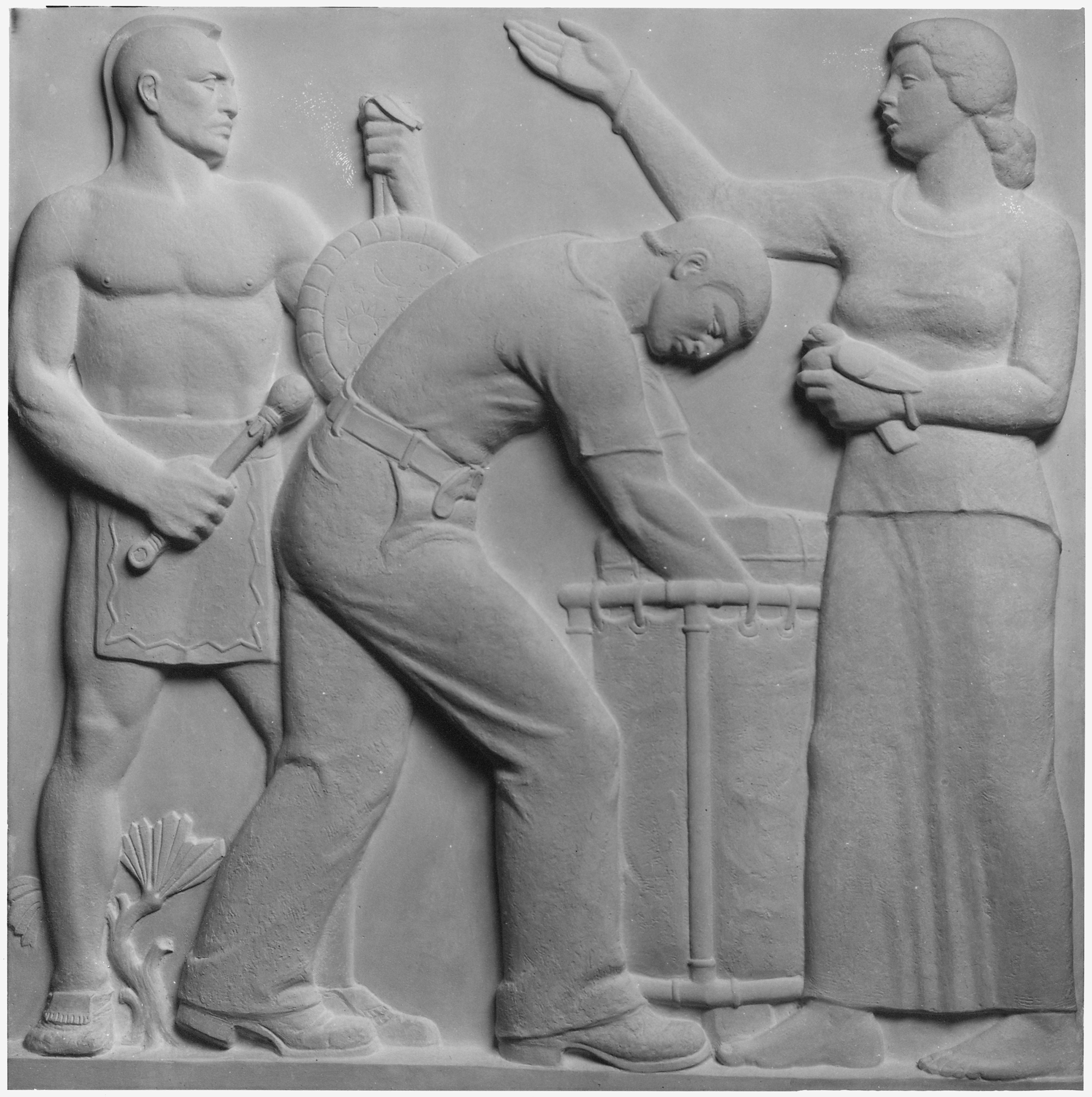
Messengers (1938), terracotta relief by Humbert Albrizio for the United States Post Office (Hamilton, New York)

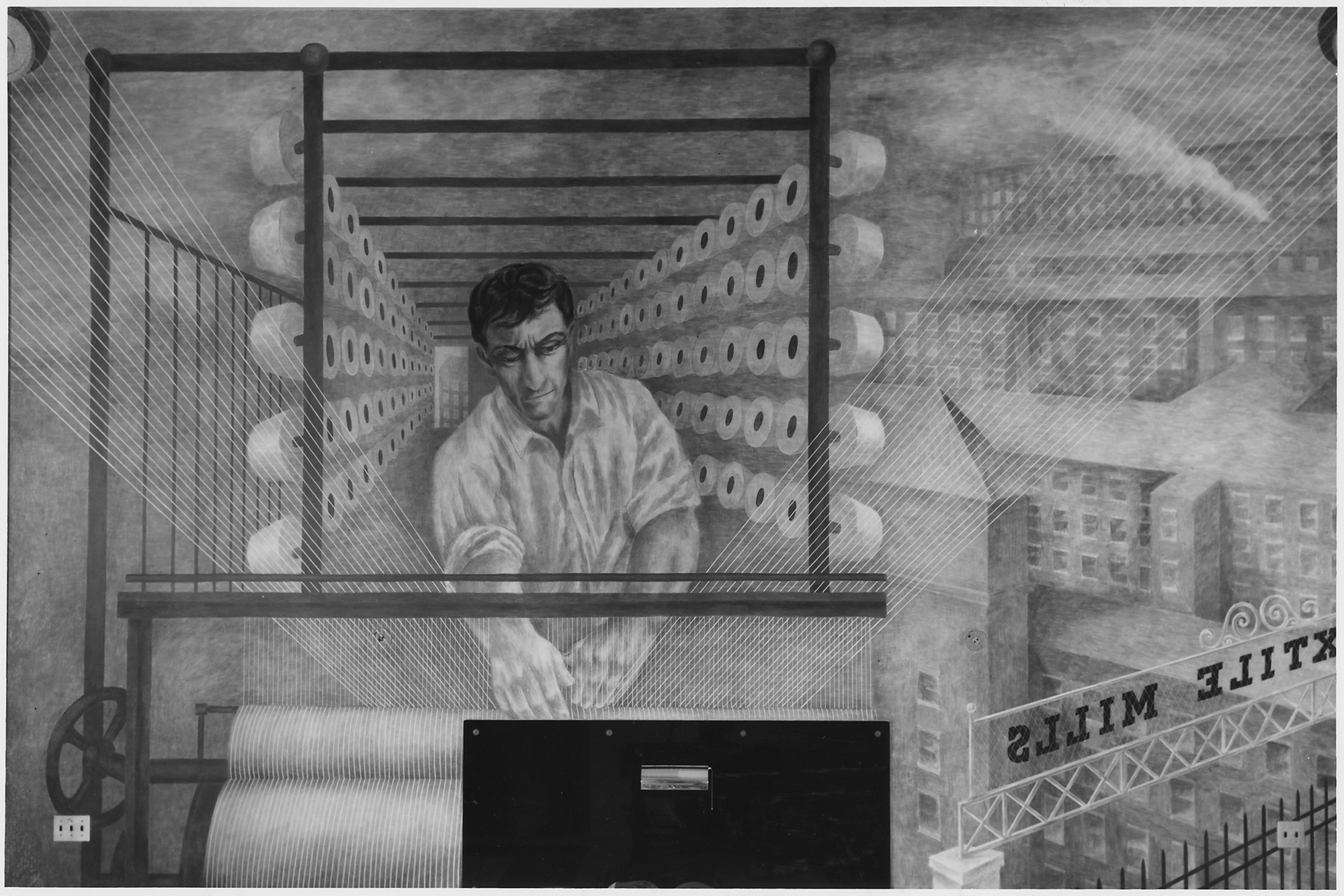
One of 13 murals in fresco in the series Resources of America (1939) by Ben Shahn and Bernarda Bryson Shahn for the Bronx General Post Office

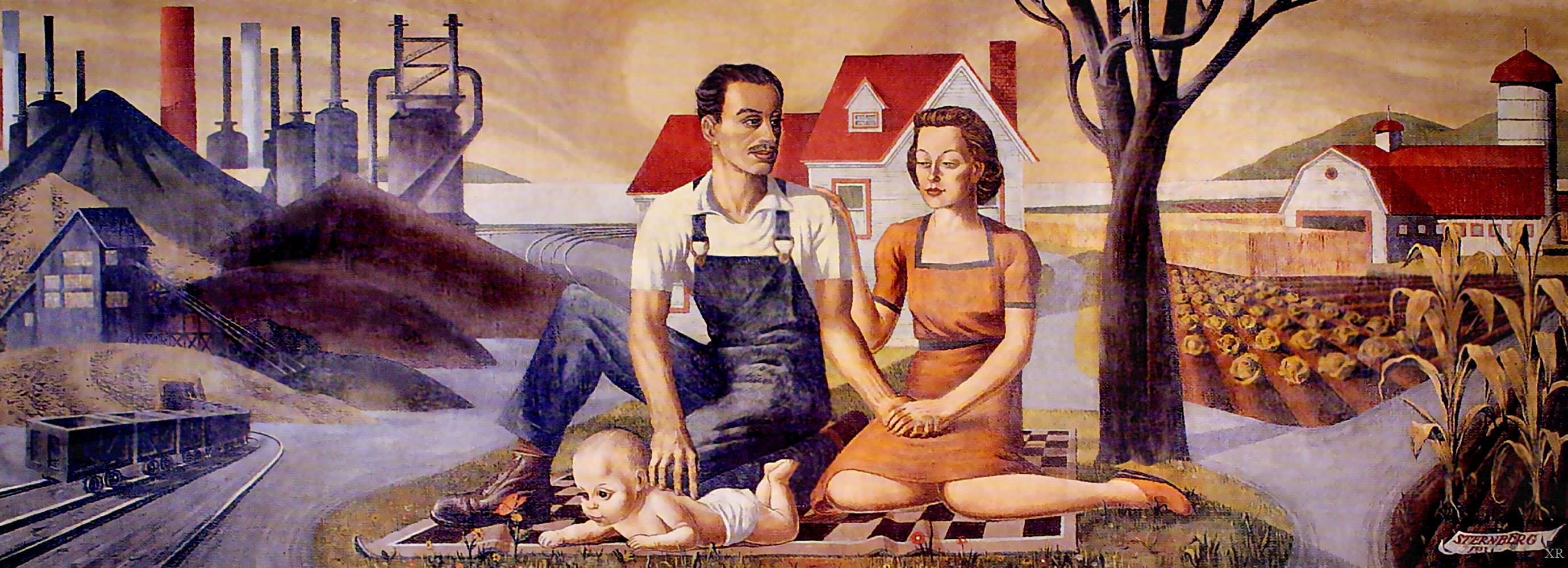
The Family, Industry and Agriculture (1939) by Harry Sternberg, in the old Ambler, Pennsylvania U.S. Post Office

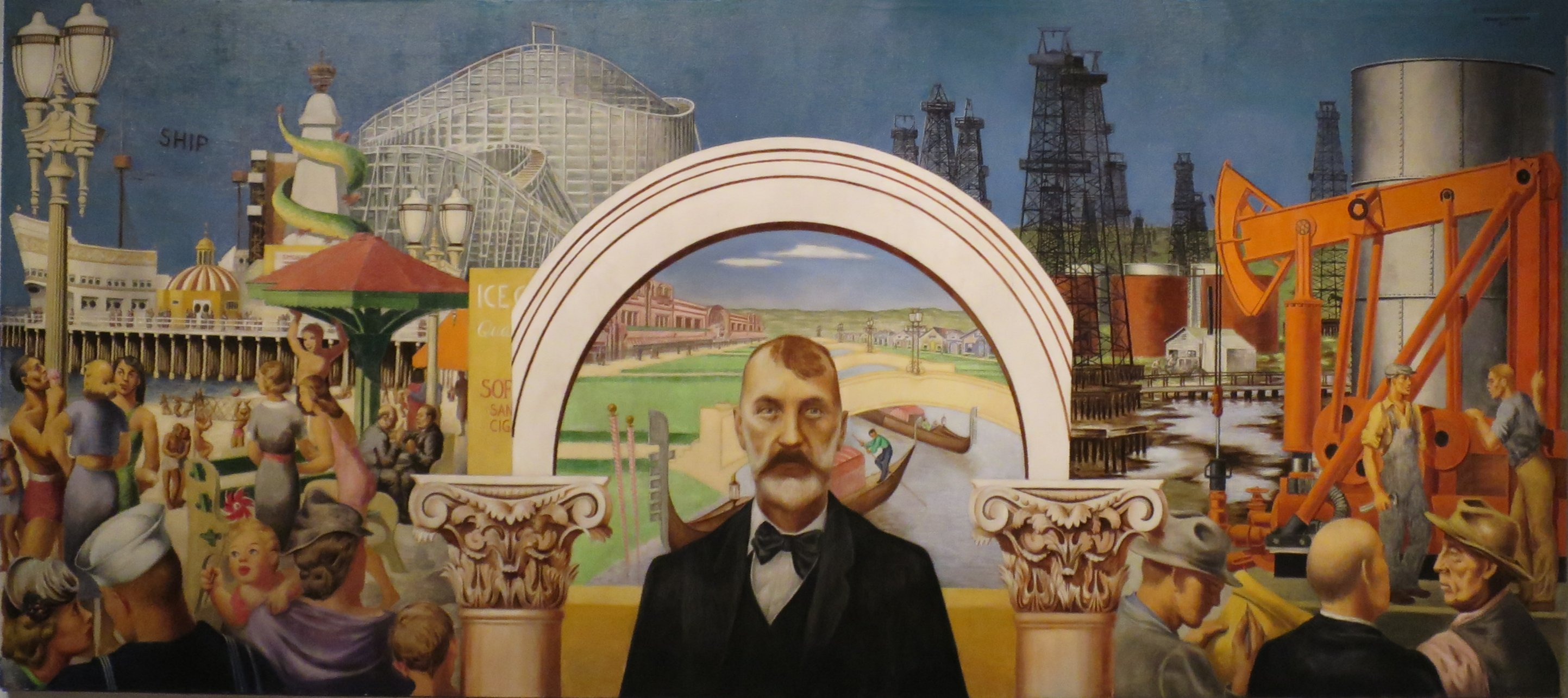
The Story of Venice (1941), mural by Edward Biberman for the U.S. Post Office in Venice, Los Angeles, California

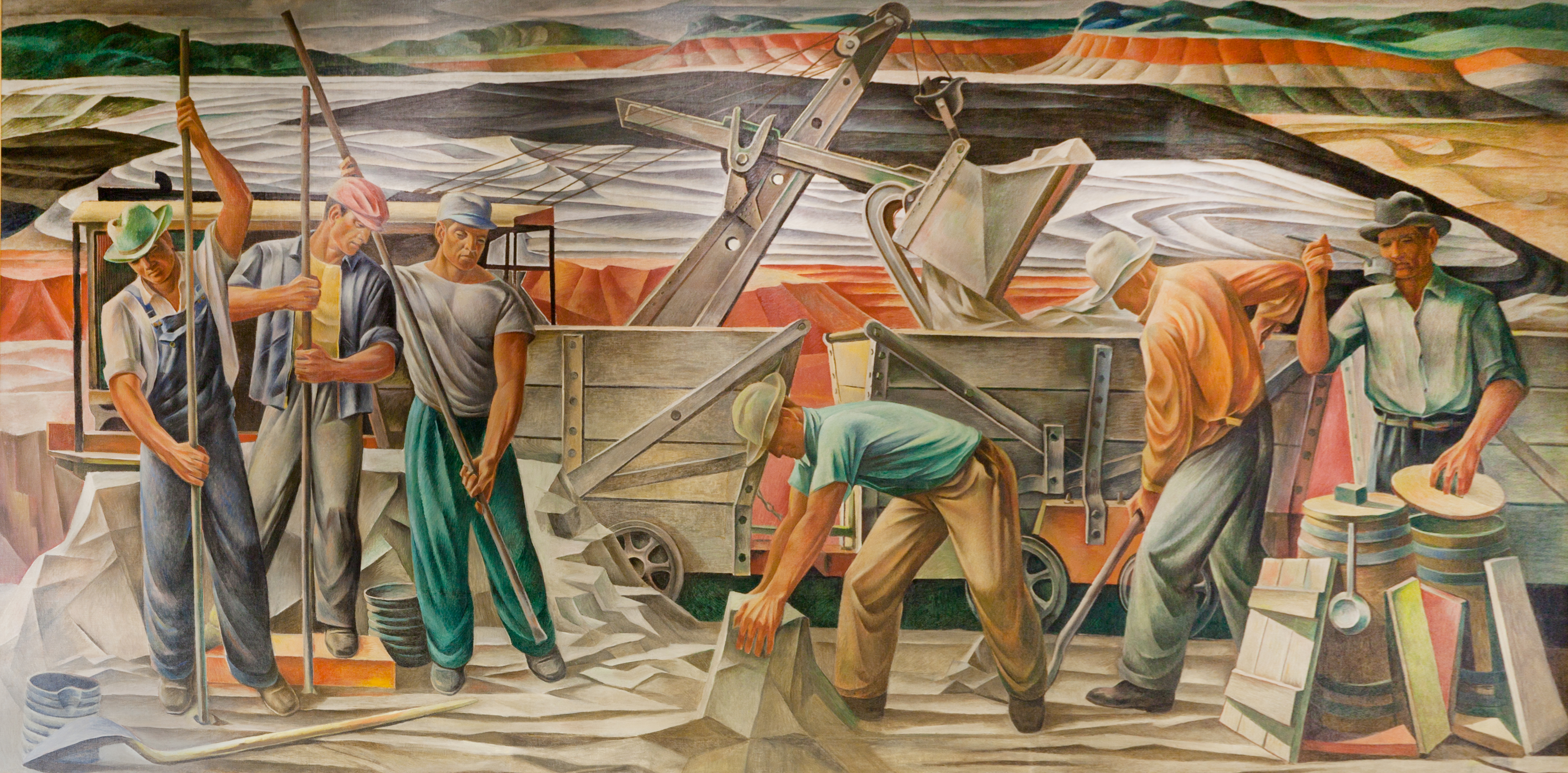
The Bauxite Mines (1942), mural by Julius Woeltz for the U.S. Post Office in Benton, Arkansas

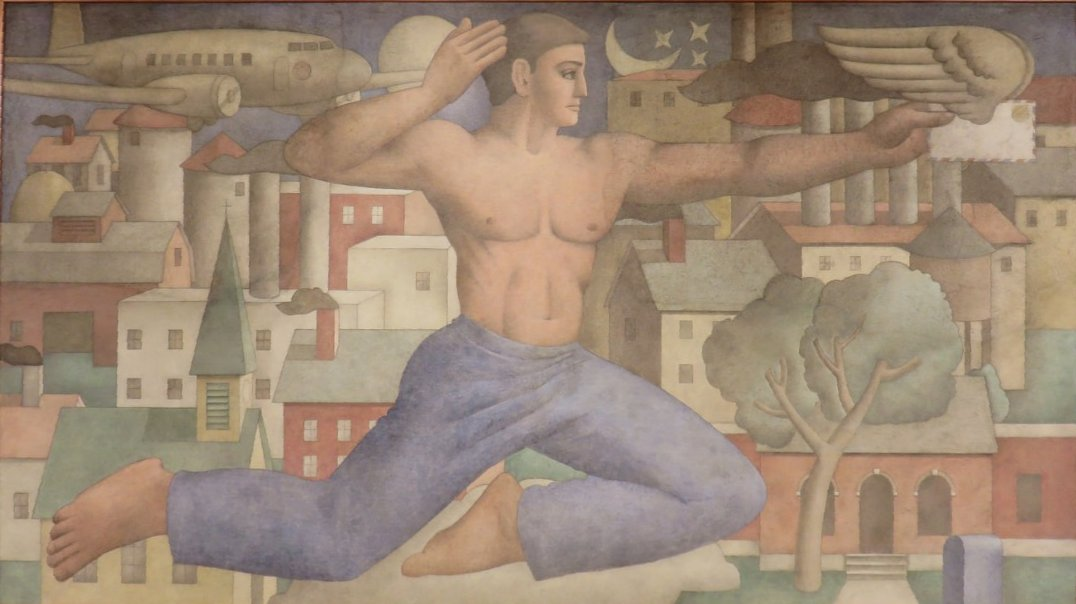
Airmail (1937), fresco by Edwin Boyd Johnson for the U.S. Post office in Melrose Park, Illinois

== Final years ==
In 1939, under the Reorganization Act, all Treasury Department and WPA arts programs were incorporated into the Federal Works Agency, but the outbreak of World War II and other factors were soon to end the programs. Edward Bruce died of a heart attack in January 1943. By the end of 1943, all of the New Deal art programs had been shut down.

== See also ==
- List of Federal Art Project artists
- List of New Deal sculpture
- Treasury Relief Art Project
- United States post office murals
