= Death (statue) =

1935 statue by Isamu Noguchi

Coordinates: 40.7669°N 73.9381°W

Death is a statue by Isamu Noguchi, depicting a dead body of a person who had been lynched, inspired by the 1930 lynching of George Hughes in Texas. The almost life-sized statue was exhibited at one of two 1935 New York anti-lynching exhibitions, where its bad and overtly racist reception caused its creator to change career direction.

== Description ==
The statue was a 3-foot (0.91 m) high monel metal sculpture of a lynched man, hung via a rope with a noose from a metal mount, a slightly smaller than life-sized depiction of a body of a man who had been hanged and then his body burned. The arms and legs had been contorted as though the ligaments had contracted as a result of fire. Before making it, Noguchi had seen a picture of the body after the lynching of George Hughes in 1930, which had been widely published in the northern Black press.

Noguchi presented it in the first of the 1935 exhibitions (the NAACP one), having removed it from his solo exhibition at the Marie Harriman Gallery. Despite having smoothed over details of the body to give it a more abstract form, it was one of several items whose gruesome realism reviewers of the NAACP exhibition found shocking. Indeed, it was particularly singled out for its grisly realism by reviewers, criticized (for example) for "aesthetic opportunism", and as "macabre" and "bizarre" by ARTnews. Edward Alden Jewell of The New York Times considered it disastrously realistic, evoking extreme horror at the agony of a lynching, and more sensational than of actual artistic value. The reviewer for The Christian Century put it more mildly, saying that if the purpose of art was to magnify its materials, then Death "hits the mark" and "intensifies the horror of a lynching".

Comments by The New York Sun critic Henry McBride were deemed overtly racist. Previously a supporter of Noguchi, McBride had occasionally used descriptions such as "wily" and "semi-oriental" for him, but for Death he was more direct, saying that "this gruesome study of a lynching with a contorted figure dangling from an actual rope, may be like a photograph from which it was made, but as a work of art it is a little Japanese mistake". Noguchi was being viewed as an "outsider", who was not permitted to comment on United States barbarisms. In immediate response to this Noguchi removed it from the NAACP exhibition on its fourth day and instead displayed it at the Artists' Union exhibition.

In his autobiography written 30 years later, Noguchi cited this as in part why he stopped exhibiting in galleries and took to designing stage sets instead.

== Bibliography ==
=== References ===
- Apel, Dora (2004). Imagery of Lynching – Black Men, White Women, and the Mob. New Brunswick, New Jersey, and London: Rutgers University Press. pp. 92–97. LCCN 2004-301; ISBN 978-0-8135-3458-9, 0-8135-3458-5; OCLC 54046317 (all editions).
1. Via Internet Archive.
- Lyford, Amy (2013). Isamu Noguchi's Modernism: Negotiating Race, Labor, and Nation, 1930–1950. Berkeley, Los Angeles, London: Univ of California Press. pp. 1–2. LCCN 2013-5403; ISBN 978-0-5202-5314-8; OCLC 818734493 (all editions).
1. Via Google Books (limited preview).
