= The Law Is Too Slow =

1923 lithograph by George Bellows

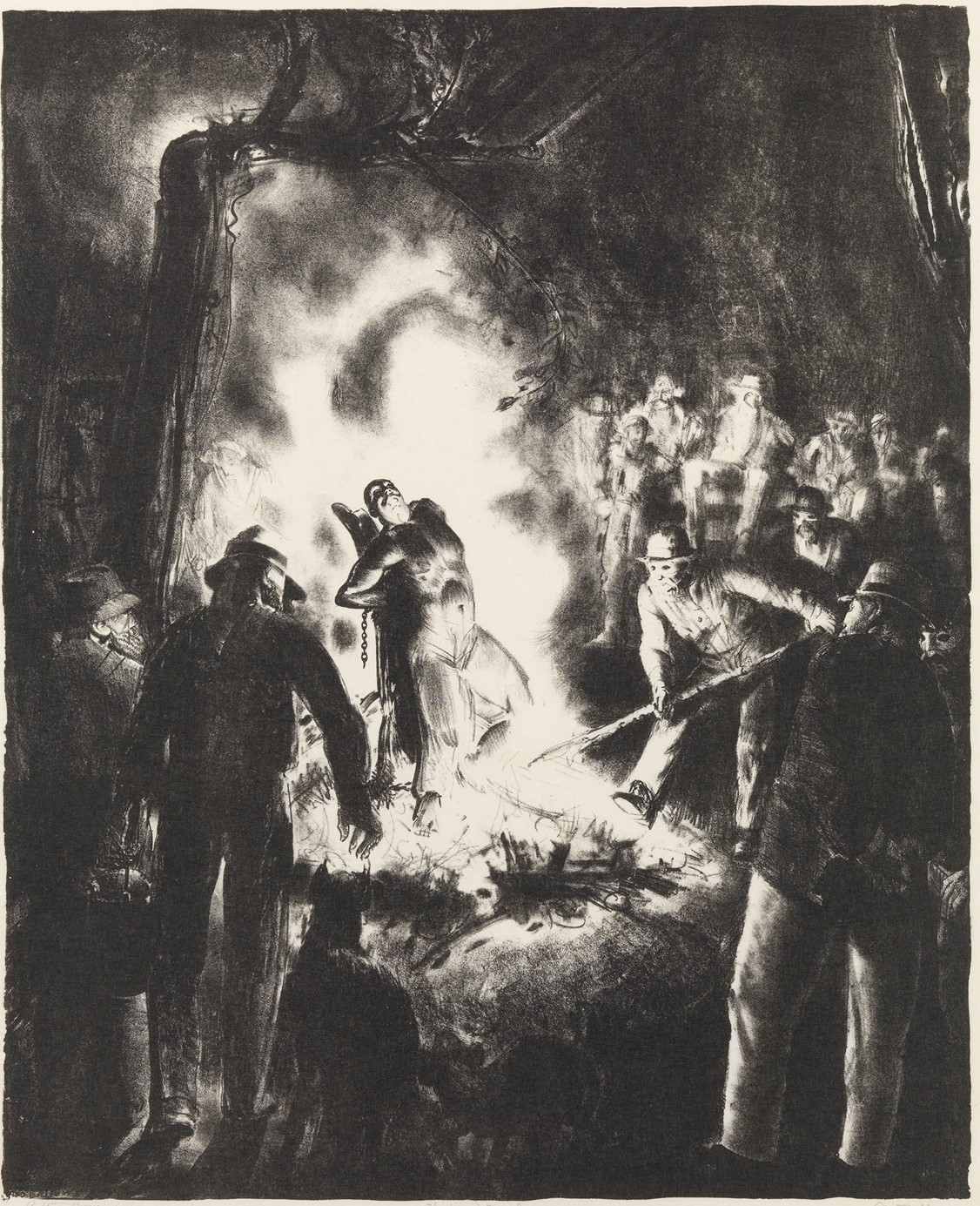
The Law Is Too Slow (1923)

The Law Is Too Slow is a 1923 lithograph by American artist George Bellows (1882–1925), depicting the victim of a racist lynching. Originally commissioned to illustrate an anti-lynching story by Mary Johnston, the image came to be used by publications and organizations including the NAACP to advocate against lynching, and for federal anti-lynching legislation.

== Background and description ==
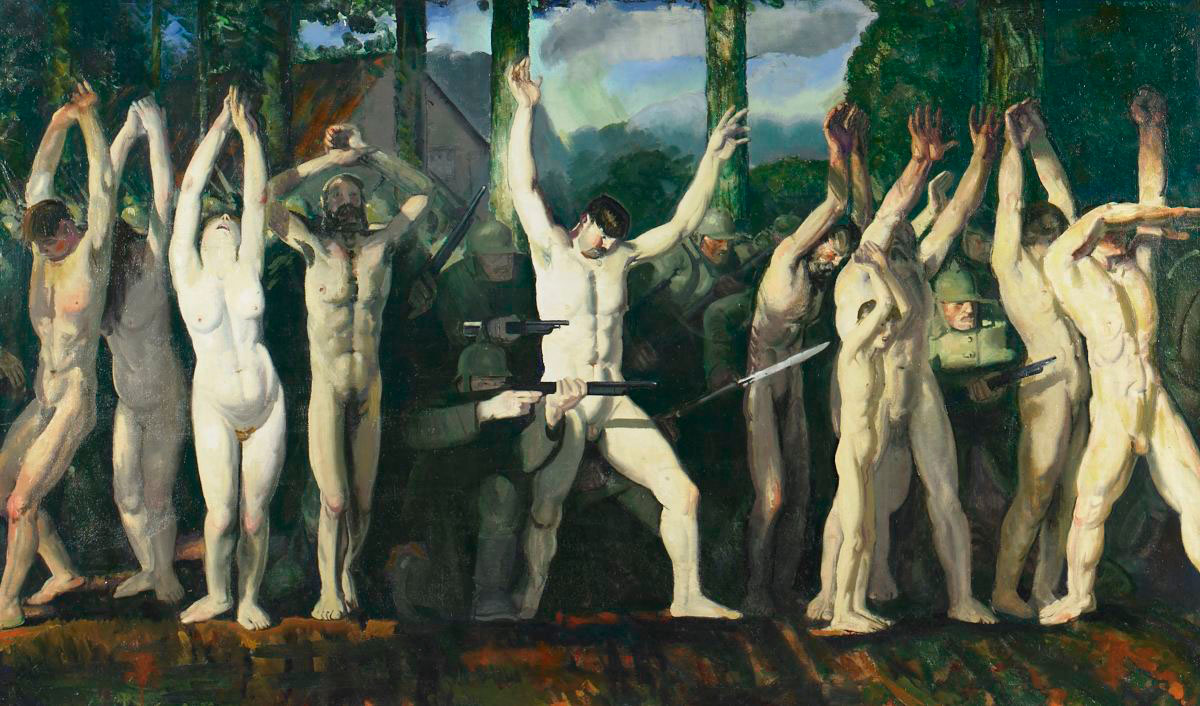
The Barricade (1918), part of Bellows' series depicting fictionalized atrocities by the German Army

Bellows, a progressive aligned with a group of artists known as the "Lyrical Left", had made a number of paintings and lithographs during World War I; they depicted atrocities and crimes against humanity believed to have been committed by German soldiers as they advanced into Belgium. He then turned to another matter: the racist violence against African Americans, especially in the Deep South. When he was young he read an account of a lynching in Delaware in the newspaper, and this was said to have affected him deeply and influenced The Law Is Too Slow.

The work was commissioned to illustrate an anti-lynching story in the May 1923 issue of The Century Magazine by American author Mary Johnston, "Nemesis": the supposed attack on a White woman by a Black man leads to a lynching.

The title has a double meaning: the supposed slowness of the judicial system was often an excuse for lynchings, and so the community took matters into their own hands, but it also pointed at the slowness with which the US political system addressed the racial violence, and never passed a federal anti-lynching bill.

The lithograph depicts a muscular man dressed only in loose pants, shackled to a tree stump and looking up in agony, as one man from a group surrounding the victim rakes a fire at the victim's feet. The scene is set at night, and the surrounding men's faces, partly covered by masks, are lit by the fire, which also creates an area of light that engulfs and illuminates the victim.

== Analysis ==
Critic Dora Apel sees blood pouring from between the victim's legs, which suggests castration; she also posits that the way the events are staged makes the viewer part of the hooded and masked audience, a participant in the killing. The image shares a characteristic with Bellows's earlier lithographs of boxing matches: here also is a man in a "ring", but it is a ring of fire.

Dora Apel's analysis of the image also involves the gaze, and the contradictory doubleness of the Black body from the white perspective. The victim's "nudity and powerful body" reiterates an old motif, that of the naked hero's power, which in the classical tradition is tied to whiteness. But the heroic nudity of the Black man's body is contradicted by his powerlessness, his victimhood. In addition, Apel says, he is subjected to a white masculine gaze. He is positioned as an abject victim, but also as "the restrained 'black beast' common in racist southern rhetoric". Thus his virility demonstrates the power of the racist trope of the Black man out to rape white women (the very subject of Johnston's story). Apel concludes, "the Bellows print thus exposes two sides of lynching mythology that depend upon each other: black men are terrifying animals that must be restrained and destroyed, and black men are desirable and manly". Martin Berger's analysis takes a very different tack; he argues that the scene "mimicked the preferred white formula for depicting racial violence", and that it allowed Northern whites to see it as an image of violence by Southern whites, not a violence that they themselves participated in. Berger claims the same applies to the Johnston story; "short story and lithograph both demarcated an artificial divide between white actors that ignored their shared investment in a racial value system that was patently unfair to blacks. The lithograph was ultimately a vehicle for white emotion, not introspection."

== Usage ==
After its initial publication in Century, it came to be used for other anti-lynching purposes. An article in the January 1928 issue of Opportunity: A Journal of Negro Life, listing a number of lynching victims from 1927 below a print of Bellows's lithograph, also had the same title. Walter Francis White, leader of the NAACP and a longtime advocate of anti-lynching bills, used the image for the cover of his 1929 book Rope and Faggot: A Biography of Judge Lynch, and he included the print in 1935 in an anti-lynching art exhibition, An Art Commentary On Lynching, in New York City, alongside works like This Is Her First Lynching by Reginald Marsh.

== See also ==
- List of works by George Wesley Bellows
