= Mabel Cory Costigan =

American community and church leader

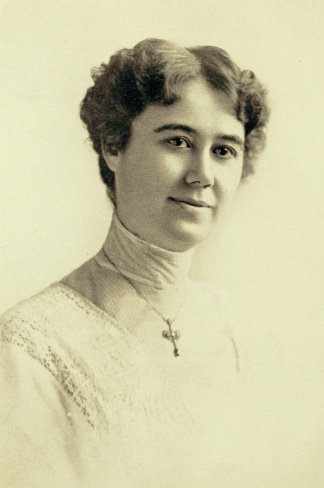
- Mabel Cory Costigan, Representative Women of Colorado, 1914
- Born: Mabel Cory; August 28, 1873; Patch Grove, Wisconsin, U.S.
- Died: 1951 (aged 77–78); Denver, Colorado, U.S.
- Known for: Activism

Mabel Costigan (née Cory; 1873–1951) was an American community and church leader and advocate for labor laws for children and foreign-born individuals. Among her many social and political endeavors, she served on the advisory council of the National Child Labor Committee and was vice president of the National Consumers League.

== Early life ==
Mabel Cory was born on August 28, 1873, in Patch Grove, Wisconsin. Her parents were Dr. Jerome B. and Amanda (McLean) Cory, who had seven children. Her father was a physician and a politician who advocated for temperance. While she was a girl, her family moved to Wellington, Kansas. She attended East Denver High School, where she was class secretary, and graduated from the Denver Normal and Preparatory School.

== Career ==
=== Education ===
She taught kindergarten for eight years and was an expert on Sunday school primary work. A Methodist, she was involved in church affairs and served as president of the Denver Graded Union of Sunday-school teachers. Costigan was a lecturer and story-teller. She was also a historian of the Colorado branch of the National Congress of Mothers (now named the Parent Teacher Association).

=== Child labor ===
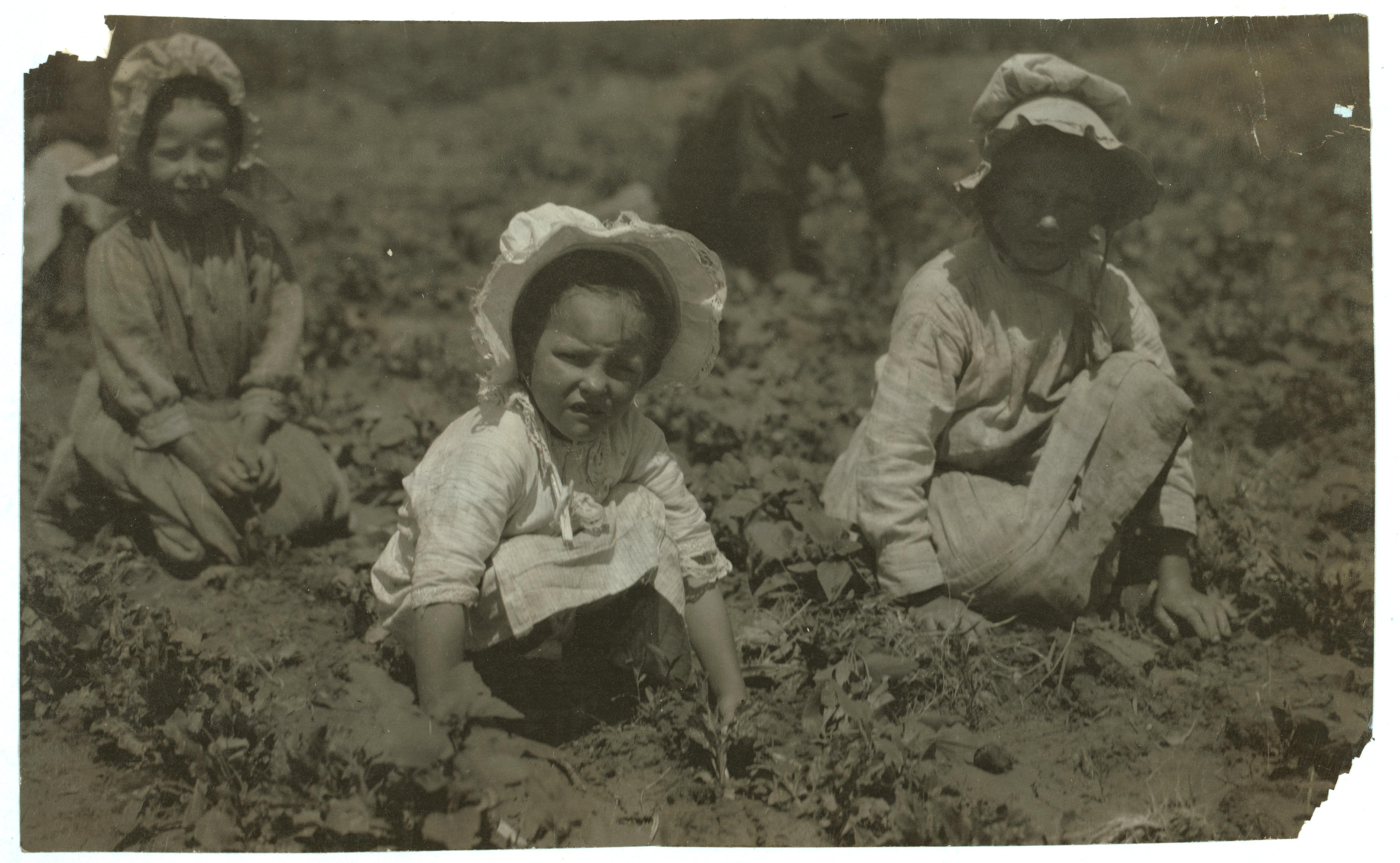
Child sugar beet workers at Sugar City, Colorado, in July 1915. The children, Mary (6), Lucy (8), and Ethel (10), work during the summer and go to school in the winter.

She campaigned for child labor law, particularly interested in prohibiting the practice of using children in sugar beet fields. Mabel was a member of the National Child Labor Committee advisory council. She was also interested in the plight of foreign-born individuals in labor practices. She was a member of the National Women's Trade Union League. In 1934, her husband co-sponsored the Jones–Costigan amendment to the Sugar Act, which reformed the sugar industry and prohibited the hiring of workers under 14 years-of-age and set a maximum eight-hour work day for 14 to 16 year-olds.

=== Politics ===
Costigan was a suffragist, which was rewarded when the 19th Amendment of the American Constitution that granted women the right to vote was passed by Congress on June 4, 1919, and ratified on August 18, 1920. She was an active member of the National League of Women Voters, with a national presence.

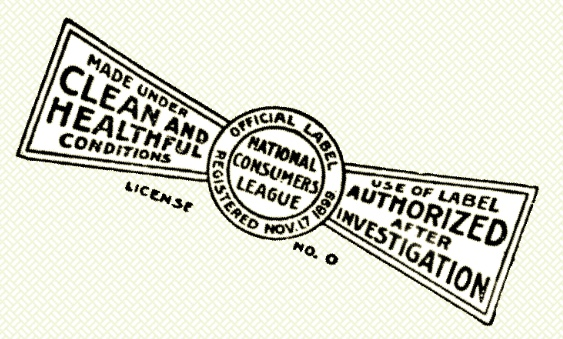
National Consumers League Label - 1899

Costigan was vice president of the National Consumers League, for whom she wrote Food Problem and National Legislation in 1921. She lobbied legislators in Washington, D.C., on behalf of the National Consumers League. She was described in 1926 as one of "two score, diligent, feminine representatives of the organized women of the country who have become the most powerful lobby ever concentrated in the national capital" by Oliver P. Newman, Former President of the Board of Commissioners of the District of Columbia. Costigan was said to have been a notable and hard-working presence in Washington, D.C., since World War I. Selma Borchardt, who represented the American Federation of Teachers, was the other of two women said to be highly effective. She was serious in her approach and found that legislators "meet with us [women] and deal with us exactly as if we were men, presenting a case on its merits." She remained active in the National Consumer League for many years.

She was active in the Conference for Progressive and Political Action in the early 1920s. The Conference was an organization of activists who promoted third-party politics and advocated for the interests of farmers and laborers. In 1924, she campaigned for Robert M. La Follette, the Progress Party's presidential candidate, speaking to thousands of women workers in New York, Massachusetts, and Rhode Island. Her husband was elected a United States Senator in 1930. With Jeanne Rankin, she led a coalition of 3,000 women that pressured the Republican and Democratic parties to add the issue of peace to their platforms in 1932.

=== Other organizations ===
Costigan was involved in community affairs. She was the president of the Woman's Club of Denver, chairwoman of the industrial committee of the Colorado State Federation of Women's Clubs, and a member of other organizations serving the interests of children, women, and other civic interests. She sat on the board of directors of the Woman's Public Service League of Denver.

== Personal life ==
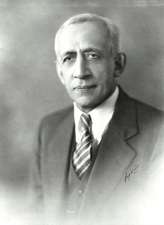
Edward P. Costigan, a lawyer, politician and activist

She married Edward P. Costigan, a fellow high school classmate and the class president, in Denver on June 12, 1903. Costigan was a lawyer, politician, and activist who served in the United States Senate from 1931 to 1937. They were partners in reform throughout their married life.

She died in 1951 and was buried at Fairmount Cemetery in Denver.
