= Clifford C. Parks =

American politician

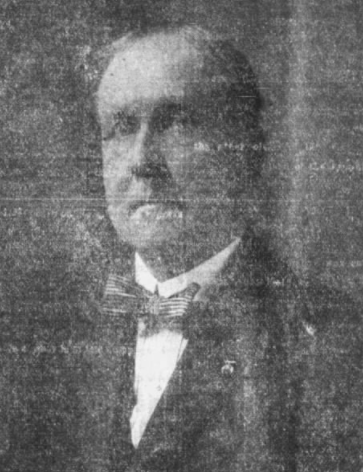

State auditor of Colorado
- In office 1895–1896

Personal details
- Born: April 18, 1860 Neponset, Illinois, U.S.
- Died: June 21, 1937 (aged 77) Rochester, Minnesota, U.S.
- Party: Republican
- Spouse: Harriet R. Elrick
- Children: Charlotte Nancy
- Parents: Granville C. Parks (father); Nancy McKee (mother)

Clifford C. Parks (April 18, 1860 – June 21, 1937) was an American politician and businessman who served as the state auditor for Colorado from 1894 to 1896 and as mayor of Glenwood Springs multiple times.

== Life ==
In 1887, he was appointed by President Harrison as the receiver of the land office in Glenwood Springs which Parks would hold until 1891. In 1894, he was given the Republican nomination for state auditor at the state convention with 558 votes against E. L. Price's 394.

During Colorado's gubernatorial election in 1912, Parks ran for the Republican nomination and he supported allowing attorney Philip B. Stewart to petition his way onto the Republican primary ballot where Parks would narrowly defeat him. Due to the division of the Republican vote between Parks and Progressive nominee Edward P. Costigan the Democrats were able to easily win the election with Elias M. Ammons defeating both candidates with over 40% of the vote, but the Republicans attempted to have Parks' finish in the popular vote moved from third to second since the second-finishing party would have the choice of judges and officers of elections for the 1914 gubernatorial election. Parks was elected as a Colorado State University regent in 1914. In 1925, he was elected to the board of directors of the Federal Reserve Bank of Kansas City.

In early June 1937, Parks went to a Rochester, Minnesota hospital for an operation, but died two weeks later on June 21, 1937.

Party political offices
Preceded by John B. Stephen	Republican nominee for Governor of Colorado; 1912	Succeeded by George Alfred Carlson
