= Aaron Goodelman =

American sculptor

Aaron Goodelman (1890 – 1978) was an American sculptor. He graduated from art school in Odessa, fleeing Eastern Europe for the United States in 1904 because of antisemitic violence.. He attended a number of major art schools in New York and Paris, and at the outbreak of World War I returned to New York and became a sculptor there. He joined the Communist Party, and took part in an important exhibition denouncing the lynching of African Americans. Following World War II, he began to make art related to the Holocaust, and taught art at City College of New York.

== Biography ==
Aaron J. Goodelman was born in Ataki, now Otaci, in what was then Bessarabia, now Moldova, and graduated from an art school in Odessa, in Ukraine. Threatened by pogroms, he immigrated to the US, to New York City. He attended the Cooper Union and then the National Academy of Design, and was in Paris by 1914, studying at the Beaux-Arts de Paris with French sculptor Jean Antoine Injalbert, but when World War I broke out he had to return to the US. To support himself during the 1920s he worked as a machinist, and became a communist (he joined the Communist party, the Yiddish branch), using his art to express his thoughts about the economic and social conditions of the time. By the early 1930s he showed his work at the John Reed Club; he also participated in one of the 1935 New York anti-lynching exhibitions, with a statue that denounced the racism and the violent lynchings of African Americans in the US. For the YKUF, the (Communist) Jewish Culture Association, he was an art editor, and he co-founded the Society of American Sculptors. Besides sculpture in various materials, he did illustrations for children's books. He turned to art inspired by the Holocaust after World War II, and in the 1960s taught at the City College of New York. He died in New York City in 1978.

== Works ==
Sculptures, in both wood and stone, by Goodelman can be found in the collections of the Jewish Theological Seminary, Hebrew Union College, the Skirball Museum, the Mishkan Museum of Art, the Tel Aviv Museum, and the Habima Theater. The Judah L. Magnes Museum held his only museum retrospective exhibition in 1965.

=== Necklace ===
His work Necklace, a statuette (23x6x4 inches) created in 1933, was displayed in Struggle for Negro Rights, one of two 1935 New York anti-lynching exhibitions. Art historian Andrew Hemingway had high praise for the work; rather than the stereotypical depiction of a muscular body, Goodelman, influenced perhaps by the work of Amedeo Modigliani, created a slender, elegant figure that "systematically...counter[ed] every offensive stereotype of the black male: excessive sexuality, emotional display, intellectual deficiency", in the words of Hemingway. Goodelman had originally designed a more complex statue, as his drawings indicate, with a noose around the neck and the body attached to "an elliptical wooden shape", but in the end left only the noose. Art historian Milly Heid described the figure as that of a "rather effeminate naked young man, his body intact, his eyes drooping". Goodelman, she says, "plays on the discrepancy between the beauty of the protagonist and his fate and on the painful contradiction between the poetic title Necklace and the strangling noose". The sculpture commemorated the case of the Scottsboro Boys.

Goodelman had his first one-man exhibition in 1933, and Necklace was received very well, being singled out and drawing praise from reviewers in the New York City papers and in Art News.

=== Other sculptures ===
Kultur, in the collection of the Smithsonian American Art Museum, is a wood figure depicting an upright man with his hands chained above high above his head, the figure elongated and stretched to convey the man as fighting against torture or lynching. It represents injustices done by Germany in World War Two.

=== Book and magazine illustrations ===
Goodelman provided the illustrations for Leon Elbe's book Yingele ringele and the second (1922) cover design for the Workmen's Circle's children's magazine Kinderland. The latter is a girl astride a disproportionately large goat, echoing the girl on a swing that Goodelman had previously used for the first cover of Kinder zhurnal. The goat's hind leg and tail form the letter kuf, the first (Hebrew) letter of the word "Kinderland". Whilst the goat's features are detailed, the girl is shown only in silhouette.

He also illustrated Joseph Gaer's 1929 The burning bush.
