= This Is Her First Lynching =

1934 anti-lynching cartoon by Reginald Marsh

Original 1934 cartoon

This Is Her First Lynching is a 1934 anti-lynching editorial cartoon by American artist Reginald Marsh. It shows a white crowd attending a lynching; a woman in the crowd has a young child on her shoulders, and says to her neighbor, "This is her first lynching". The cartoon was shown in one of two 1935 New York anti-lynching exhibitions that aimed to support anti-lynching legislation. Scholars regard it as showing a young white girl's initiation in a communal process of racist violence.

== Description ==
The cartoon was published in The New Yorker in 1934, and republished in The Crisis (the NAACP's journal), and depicts a mob in a rural part of America at a lynching. The mob consists of white people, men and women with wide-brimmed hats and bonnets, with a farmhouse in the back; they are watching events on the viewer's left, outside of the picture. At right, an older woman holds up a young girl, who is looking at the lynching in a "pensive and perhaps confused" way; the older woman tells her neighbor, "This is her first lynching". (Matthew Teutsch, a scholar of African-American literature, says "the girl appears inquisitive, as if she is learning a lesson".)

Walter Francis White, leader of the NAACP and a longtime advocate of anti-lynching bills, used the image in 1935 in an anti-lynching art exhibition, An Art Commentary On Lynching, in New York City, alongside works like The Law Is Too Slow by George Bellows. The year earlier, Marsh had donated the original of the drawing to the NAACP office in Manhattan, New York, prompting White to write a thank-you letter stating it to be "the nucleus of a collection of drawings dealing with lynching" in the office and of those "the most effective one I have ever seen", also telling Marsh that he had recommended it for a Pulitzer Prize.

== Meaning and evaluation ==
The image shows lynching as a communal event, staged for entertainment purposes, and how women, usually considered to be peaceful and nurturing, participate in the violent affair and initiate their children into it. Critic Apel comments that the elision of the Black body allows viewers to feel somewhat comfortable, and helps create a distance between the subject matter and the viewer, which in turn allows the viewer to feel moral superiority over the mob — in contrast to for instance Bellows's The Law Is Too Slow.

The scene works, according to Andrew Ritchey and Barry Ruback, by way of deindividuation: the blurry faces and bodies that make up a single mass indicate that the participants have lost themselves in a greater group, which is given by many scholars as the most important reason lynchings, in all their norm-breaking atrocity, could happen. Ritchey and Ruback's study, a quantitative analysis of lynchings in the state of Georgia, bore out the idea that this violent behavior is enforced by "observational learning": "People learned from their first and from subsequent lynchings."

The scene where the mob storms the jail in the 1936 Spencer Tracy movie Fury echoes This Is Her First Lynching as there also a mother lifts her child for a better view, although both had been preceded by a widely circulated photograph of the lynching of Thomas Thurmond and John Holmes in 1933 where in real life a spectator had lifted up a young girl. According to Matthew Teutsch, the little girl resembles a young white boy in volume 2 of the comic book March, who is being taught by his father to perpetrate violence on Jim Zwerg, one of the Freedom Riders, on May 20, 1961, in Montgomery, Alabama.
