= 1912 Colorado gubernatorial election =

- November 8, 1912
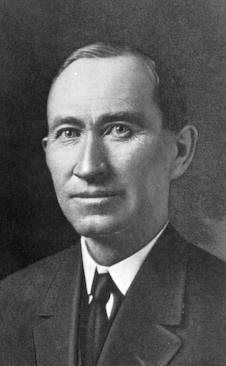

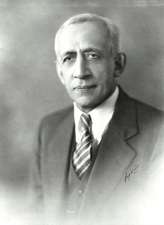

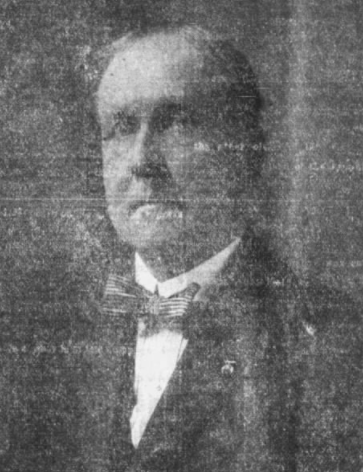
Nominee	Elias M. Ammons	Edward P. Costigan
Party	Democratic	Progressive
Popular vote	114,044	66,132
Percentage	42.91%	24.88%
Nominee	Clifford C. Parks	Charles A. Ashelstrom
Party	Republican	Socialist
Popular vote	63,061	16,189
Percentage	23.73%	6.09%
- County results Ammons: 30–40% 40–50% 50–60% 60–70% 70–80% Parks: 40–50% 50–60% 60–70%
Governor before election
John F. Shafroth
Democratic
Elected Governor
Elias M. Ammons
Democratic

The 1912 Colorado gubernatorial election took place on November 8, 1912. Democratic state Senator Elias M. Ammons defeated the Progressive, Republican and Socialist candidates future Senator Edward P. Costigan, Clifford C. Parks and Charles A. Ashelstrom with 42.91% of the vote.

== Background ==
In 1910, incumbent Democratic Governor John F. Shafroth had won reelection by a 51–43 margin against Republican State Senator John B. Stephen. Shafroth two terms in office were defined by his push for progressive reforms. He successfully passed direct primary, recall, home rule and labor control laws against strong opposition of the Democratic machine in Denver and Colorado corporations. In 1912, Shafroth decided against running for another term. Instead, he successfully ran for United States Senator that year.

At the beginning of the 20th century, the Republican party was divided into two main wings: the progressives (led by Theodore Roosevelt) and the conservatives (led by William Howard Taft). The rift between the two wings had deepened during Taft's service as 27th President of the United States, prompting former President Roosevelt to run against the incumbent Taft for the Republican nomination in the 1912 United States Presidential Election. Taft won the nomination at the 1912 Republican National Convention in Chicago, causing Roosevelt to found the Progressive Party and run as a third-party candidate. In many other national and state elections in the year 1912, candidates ran against the Democratic and Republican nominees under Roosevelt's "Progressive" or "Bull Mouse" Banner.

In Colorado, Edward P. Costigan quickly emerged as the leader of the new Progressive Party and was chosen by the party to contest the gubernatorial race.

== Democratic primary ==
State Senator Elias M. Ammons was able to win the Democratic primary on September 10, 1912, against former Attorney General Joseph H. Maupin and Colorado State Penitentiary Warden Thomas J. Tynan. Ammons had positioned himself as a moderate reformer, who strongly opposed Roosevelt's conservation policies.

=== Candidates ===
==== Nominated ====
- Elias M. Ammons, State Senator

==== Eliminated in the primary ====
- Joseph H. Maupin, former Attorney General (1890–1892)
- Thomas J. Tynan, Colorado State Penitentiary Warden

=== Results ===
Democratic primary results
Party	Candidate	Votes	%
Democratic	Elias M. Ammons	29,349	45.10
Democratic	Thomas J. Tynan	21,037	32.33
Democratic	Joseph H. Maupin	14,686	22.57
Total votes		65,072	100.0

== Republican primary ==
Former State Auditor Clifford C. Parks was able to win the Republican primary on September 10, 1912, against attorney Philip B. Stewart. The Republican primary was shaped by the divide between "regular" Republicans which supported President Taft and "progressive" Republicans which supported former President Roosevelt. In July 1912, the progressive candidate Stewart had been asked by fellow Roosevelt supporters to leave the Republican Party and join the Progressive Party. He declined and instead ran as a Roosevelt supporter in the Republican primary. Stewart lead the race in early returns which lead multiple newspaper to call him the apparent winner. After all votes were counted, Clifford C. Parks was declared as the winner. Philip Stewart did not support the Republican ticket in the general election, and ran as a Presidential elector for Teddy Roosevelt in the 1912 presidential election.

=== Candidates ===
==== Nominated ====
- Clifford C. Parks, former Auditor of the State (1894–1896)

==== Eliminated in the primary ====
- Philip B. Stewart, Attorney

=== Results ===
Republican primary results
Party	Candidate	Votes	%
Republican	Clifford C. Parks	21,247	53.22
Republican	Philip B. Stewart	18,676	46.78
Total votes		39,923	100.0

== General Election ==
=== Results ===
Colorado gubernatorial election, 1912
Party	Candidate	Votes	%
Democratic	Elias M. Ammons	109,825	42.91%
Progressive	Edward P. Costigan	66,132	24.88%
Republican	Clifford C. Parks	63,061	23.73%
Socialist	Charles A. Ashelstrom	16,189	6.09%
Prohibition	John Henry Ketchum	5,900	2.22%
Socialist Labour	Jonathan U. Billings	460	0.17%
Total votes		261,567	100%

== Aftermath ==
Elias M. Ammons was sworn in as the 19th Governor of Colorado in Denver on January 14, 1913. In the 1912 Colorado House of Representatives and Colorado Senate elections the Democrats won a 48-17 and 24–11 majority in the 19th General Assembly, respectively. The Colorado State Government was therefore dominated by Democrats during Ammons' term from 1913 to 1915.

Ammons and the Democrats' legislative proposals would be overshadowed by the Colorado Coalfield War, which climaxed in the 1914 Ludlow Massacre. Ammons was the commander-in-chief of the Colorado National Guard, that caused the massacre by attacking the tent city called Ludlow Colony. The strike caused between 69 and 199 deaths. After the massacre, Governor Ammons was torn between the interests of the striking miners, which had political support by some Democrats like State Senator Helen Ring Robinson, and the mine owners under the leadership of John D. Rockefeller Jr. and decided to request the deployment of federal troops to calm the violent clashes. After massive criticism and nationwide outrage, Ammons decided to not run for reelection in the 1914 Colorado gubernatorial election and subsequently retired from public life.
