= Lynching of George Hughes =

Lynching of an African-American man in 1930

The lynching of George Hughes, which led to what is called the Sherman Riot, took place in Sherman, Texas, in 1930. An African-American man accused of rape and pleaded guilty in court died on May 9 when the Grayson County Courthouse was set on fire by a White mob, who subsequently burned and looted local Black-owned businesses. Martial law was declared on May 10, but by that time many of Sherman's Black-owned businesses had been burnt to the ground. Thirty-nine people were arrested, eight of whom were charged, and later, a grand jury indicted 14 men, none for lynching. By October 1931, one man received a short prison term for arson and inciting a riot. The outbreak of violence was followed by two more lynchings in Texas, one in Oklahoma, and several lynching attempts.

== Background ==
Harsh treatment by White planters toward Black sharecroppers, exacerbated by widespread economic difficulty caused by the Great Depression, led to racist violence in Texas, including in Sherman, Texas, the county seat and economic and administrative center of Grayson County. When George Hughes, a Black man, was accused of having raped a White woman at gunpoint, the fear of miscegenation and racist sensationalism led to a lynching and a violent riot at the courthouse, and then in the city's Black neighborhood. Hughes allegedly assaulted the wife of his employer at their farm, five miles southeast of Sherman, and shot at deputies after being tracked down by a deputy sheriff. He surrendered and was taken to the county jail.

A confession was quickly obtained, and George Hughes was indicted for criminal assault on Monday, May 5. A speedy trial was set for Friday, May 9. In the days preceding the trial, rumors spread about the case, among them that Hughes had allegedly mutilated the (unidentified) woman, who was supposed to be dying—these rumors were proven false, but Hughes was taken from the jail and housed elsewhere to prevent a lynching. While some were shown the inside of the jail to prove Hughes was not there, a mob still gathered outside every night, refusing to believe the truth.

== The trial, the lynching, the looting ==
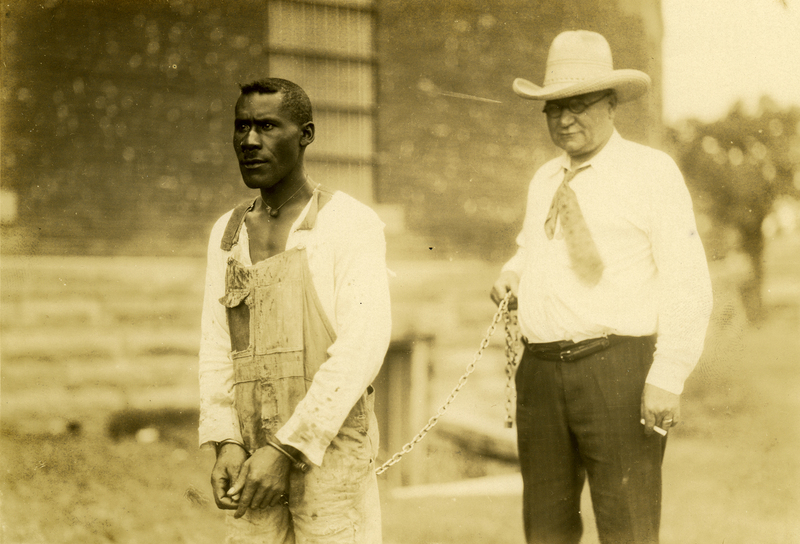
George Hughes handcuffed and chained by Sheriff Arthur Vaughan before his trial.

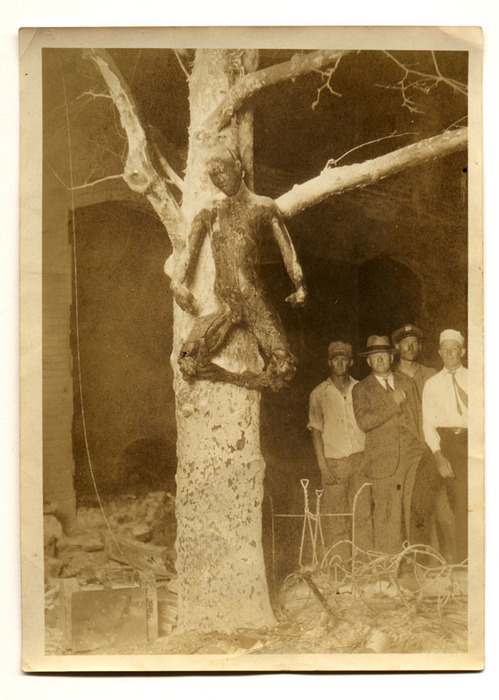
Corpse of George Hughes, Sherman Riot of 1930.

Hughes was led to the county courthouse on May 9 by Texas Ranger Captain Frank Hamer (pronounced HAY-mer) and two other rangers, along with a police sergeant, while the county sheriff and his deputies guarded the courtroom and the hallways leading to it. A large crowd had gathered outside and began filling the corridors; officers cleared part of the courthouse during jury selection and the start of the trial. Soon, still in the morning, the crowd began to throw rocks at the courthouse, with one man waving an American flag and inciting the crowd. A jury was sworn in at noon, and Hughes pleaded guilty to the indictment. While the first witness was testifying, the crowd broke through the doors of the corridor leading to the courtroom, and Texas Rangers fired warning shots, after which the jury was sent away, and while the Rangers fired tear gas, Hughes was led to the vault of the courthouse. People in the courtroom were evacuated with ladders, but the district judge could not decide on a change of venue; Hamer said he thought the trial would end violently if it was held in Sherman.

Two youths set the building on fire by throwing gasoline into an office, around 2:30 pm; it quickly spread and the officials were evacuated with ladders. Hughes, it was reported, asked the deputies that guarded him to leave him in the vault ("a huge two-story vault of steel and concrete"); he could not be rescued by Rangers because of the fire, and outside, the mob cut the water hoses and prevented the firemen from acting. The mob drove a small militia away to get to the fireproof vault, which was, by 4 pm, the only thing left standing, besides the walls of the courthouse. Governor Dan Moody had sent the National Guard, but the mob engaged in a "pitched battle" with them around 6:30 pm; a rumor had spread that Hamer was ordered not to shoot, and the Guard was pushed back. By midnight, members of the mob, using dynamite and acetylene torches, had opened the jail. Hughes was dead, and the mob pulled his body from the vault and, behind a car, they dragged him to the Black business section of Sherman, where they hanged him from a tree in front of a drugstore, and lit a fire under him, using material looted from the store. The crowd numbered over 5,000.

The mob then started burning other businesses besides the drugstore, all the while preventing firemen from doing their job. A White man saved a block of Black-owned buildings by claiming they were his; a number of Black citizens defended their property, including a local doctor armed with no more than a shotgun. The following morning, May 10, the majority of the Black-owned businesses in Sherman (including the office of Civil Rights lawyer William J. Durham), and one residential building, had been burned. The militia returned and cut down Hughes's body, but the town's two Black undertakers' businesses had been burned. A White undertaker buried Hughes's body that same morning, in an unmarked grave at the county farm.

== Aftermath ==
Black citizens of Sherman had fled the town, seeking shelter in the brush, in sewers, or among sympathetic White people. When they returned, they found that Black properties destroyed included a hotel, a movie house, a restaurant, and a barbershop, besides the drugstore and the two undertaker parlors. They were a total loss, and the small print on insurance policies stated that no damage that resulted from a riot would be compensated: "it marked the end of Black business in Sherman", according to Edward Hake Phillips, a local historian.

The town was under armed guard for a few more weeks, and while some Whites tried to help their Black fellow citizens, others threatened employers if they did not fire their Black employees, and put up notices telling Black people to get out of town or see their homes destroyed.

== Legal consequences for the mob ==
On the morning of May 10, 225 extra National Guard members arrived in Sherman, and two extra Rangers. Eleven men were arrested but six were soon released. Governor Moody finally declared martial law that evening, after local community leaders urged him to do so, and more arrests were made. A military court of inquiry was installed, and orders were given to shoot whoever attempted to burn or destroy Black-owned properties. By May 13, thirty-nine arrests had been made. A justice of the peace charged nine of them, but immediately dismissed a number of them. Troops remained stationed at the Black school, which reopened on May 14, though some Guardsmen were sent home.

On May 21, 1930, a Sherman grand jury – reporting to Grayson County District Judge Roger Mills Carter Sr. (1887–1954) – returned ninety-six indictments against thirty-two defendants, which eventually shrank to seventy indictments against fourteen mob members. Maury Hughes (1894–1955) and Ted Monroe (né Theodore Fuller Monroe; 1890–1952), both of Dallas, were retained to represent 13 of the indicted men. Hughes had been a member of the Dallas Ku Klux Klan, but resigned and became an opponent of the Klan.

In the end, only one man was convicted. J.B. "Screw" McCasland (né J.B. McCasland; 1912–1997) – on a change of venue, tried in Austin – was convicted June 4, 1931, for arson and July 1, 1931, for participating in a riot. He was sentenced to the penitentiary, two years for each conviction. No one was charged for the lynching.

Martial law was lifted on May 24, 1930. The Herald Democrat printed an editorial criticizing the riots and property damage, but not the lynching. Before the lynching and riot, McCasland had been sentenced to three years for two chicken theft charges and also sentenced for another burglary charge – he was serving a total of thirteen years. Governor Miriam A. Ferguson, on December 28, 1934, granted McCasland a conditional pardon, in part, because of the illness of his mother, Mae McCasland (née Hanna Mae Waddle; 1892–1982), who, in 1928, became a widow.

Although McCasland's conviction was for arson and rioting, not lynching, Joe Cox (né Joseph Price Cox; 1885–1970), District Attorney at Sherman who assisted in the prosecution, said that McCasland's conviction was the first in Texas growing out of mob violence against a Black man for [allegedly] attacking a White woman.

== Community resistance to memorialize the lynching and riot ==
Thirty years ago, in her doctoral dissertation, Donna Kumler stated, "Sixty-five years later, in 1995, some in this North Texas community still recall the riot, although unwillingly, and many residents, both Black and White, would rather the incident not be discussed at all."

A proposal submitted in 2020 to erect a marker (commemorating the lynching and riot) was approved by the manager of the historical marker program, but was blocked in December 2020 by Bill Magers, the Grayson County Commissioners Court Judge.

The Grayson County Commissioners Court approved a marker on the Courthouse grounds describing the Sherman Riot of 1930 and Hughes' suffocation in 2021. Magers, Jeff Whitmire and David Whitlock voted for the marker, while Bart Lawrence and Phyllis James opposed the installation. Magers downplayed the significance of the marker, but said he felt it had "come time." Lawrence said the wording was divisive and James said Hughes' accuser deserved recognition too alongside Hughes.

The Texas Historical Commission approved the marker in 2022, and the County installed it in 2025.

== Reflections by historians ==
Hollie A. Teague, in 2018, published a treatise criticizing Texas law enforcement's long history of (paraphrasing) "brutality and wanton dereliction of duty" towards Blacks. In the article, Teague summarized the lynching of George Hughes as follows: " ... accusations by Pearl Farlow, the niece of a powerful law enforcement officer in Sherman (Note: Pearl Farlow (née Pearl Inice Atnip; 1901–1943) – who, on November 15, 1921, married William Wylie Farlow (1899–1971) – was the accuser. She was a niece of Bevie V. Atnip (1894–1981), a law enforcement officer in Sherman. (Teague; 2018)) ... resulted in a power display that included the death of the accused man, the total destruction of Sherman's Black business district, the obliteration of a large courthouse, mobilization of the National Guard, and the eventual declaration of martial law. All the while, law enforcement – including the notoriously brutal Texas Ranger Frank Hamer – stood by and did nothing."

By contrast, John Boessenecker, in 2016, lauded Texas Ranger Hamer as follows: "It was clear that he [Hamer] displayed great courage defending George Hughes, for in a time and place where racial hatred ran rampant, Hamer stood unbowed before the mob. On the other hand, his failure to act while the mob destroyed the Black neighborhood was no more defensible than Sherman police directing traffic while the lynchers blew open the vault."

Texas historian Melissa Thiel, a proponent of memorializing the lynching and riot, stated, "There are eight Texas historic markers at that courthouse – several ... [for] events [that] didn't even happen at the courthouse, but this did." "Our courthouse burned down."

Graham Gordon Landrum, PhD (1922–1995), in 1960, wrote, "Some people are still sensitive about it. The names of persons who were indicted in the weeks that followed the violence, for example, have been carefully excised from the newspaper files in the public library."

== Other lynchings of Black men in Texas during the following few weeks ==
Texas farmers have found that it is cheaper to lynch a Negro than to pay him his honest wage.

— California Eagle, June 20, 1930 (re: Lynching of Bill Roan)

The lynching of George Hughes was one of five lynching attacks by Whites on Black men within nine weeks in Texas.

1. May 16, 1930: George Johnson (1900–1930), a Black man accused of slaying his White landlord, George Forrest Fortenberry (1879–1930), after an altercation over a debt, was shot to death by a sheriff's posse after he had barricaded himself in a cabin in Honey Grove, Fannin County, Texas. White men then fastened the body's feet to the back of a truck, face down. In this position the corpse was dragged five miles through the business section of town, then into the then-called "Negro section of Honey Grove," then they publicly burned his remains. Honey Grove is 50 miles east of Sherman – Fannin County is the next county over from Grayson County.
  Yes sir, White folks, I'm going to die. And, I'm asking all of you not to hold any malice against me in your hearts. The Lord has forgiven me all my sins and I am ready to go. I didn't kill the White lady, and if I had, I would tell you that I did.
  — (last words of Jesse Lee Washington)
2. June 18, 1930: Bill Roan (né William Roan), a Black man, worked for Mr. and Mrs. Henry Bowman on their farm near Benchley. June 15, 1930 – a Sunday – Henry Bowman (né Henry Monroe Bowman; 1888–1972) beat Roan for being "sassy" with his wife. Bowman allegedly took Roan to his barn, stripped him, and brutally whipped him with a wet rope. The next day, Monday, Bowman's wife, Helen Bowman (née Ruby Helen Peyton; 1898–1979), accused Roan of attempting to assault her. Local law enforcement officers, including Brazos County Deputy Sheriff C.L. Baker (né Charles Lorin Baker; 1869–1935), were apprised of the accusations, they did little to investigate. Wednesday morning, June 18, 1930, Roan was found dead by two White men, Columbus Seale (né Henry Columbus Seale; 1891–1961) (Note: Henry Columbus Seale was a distant relative of convicted KKK kidnapper and murderer, James Ford Seale (1935–2011). They were third cousins, once removed. Henry Columbus Seale was also a distant relative of Henry Bowman. Bowman's father's first wife, Samantha Ann Seale (maiden; 1834–1870) (her second marriage), was a double second cousin, twice removed, of Henry Columbus Seale – double because her father, Joshua Seale (1805–1867) and mother, Elizabeth Seale (maiden; 1813–1893) were first cousins (they had the same grandparents). Note that Texas-born civil rights activist Bobby Seale (born 1936, Liberty, Texas) bears the same surname.) and John O'Connor (né John Albert O'Connor; 1897–1960), in a pasture of a cattle ranch in Brazos County owned by Columbus's father, Robert Henry Seale (1860–1943). One of Roan's arms was "almost torn off by buckshot" and he had "a gaping wound in his chest." Roan was slain, reportedly, by a posse of a dozen White men who hunted him down. Deputy Sheriff Baker, on Tuesday, June 17, 1930, had been informed by a member of a posse of about a dozen White men that they were going to hunt for and kill Roan. Baker simply told them to "go home." After Roan's body was found, Brazos and Robertson County authorities, including Deputy Sheriff Baker, reportedly claimed to not know any members of the posse.
3. June 28, 1930: Jack Robertson, a Black man accused of shooting R.L. Egger (né Robert Lee Egger; 1896–1973), blinding him, and also accused of shooting his wife, Stella Egger (née Stella Marie Baker; 1899–1993) – both white, Mr. Egger, a dairyman said to be Robertson's employer, reportedly the result of an argument over chickens, was lynched (fatally shot) at night in Round Rock, Texas, by a posse.
4. July 12, 1930, Shamrock, Texas, a posse headed by Collingsworth County Sheriff Claude Elihu McKinney (1885–1972) thwarted a mob of 200 White men attempting to lynch Jesse Lee Washington (1909–1930), a Black farmhand accused of attacking and killing a White farm woman, Ruth Vaughan (née Mabel Ruth Tackitt; 1905–1930), wife of Henry Hugh Vaughan (1906–1932). Washington was convicted of murder and sentenced to death, which was carried out by electric chair July 12, 1930, in Huntsville. Henry Vaughan committed suicide by cyanide poisoning, September 12, 1932, in San Antonio.

=== Nearby lynching in Oklahoma ===
5. May 30, 1930: Henry Argo, a Black man, was lynched in Chickasha, Oklahoma – the birthplace of civil rights activist Ada Lois Sipuel Fisher (1924–1995), about 165 miles north-northwest of Sherman. Argo was accused of attacking Mrs. Angie Skinner (née Clara Angeline Orlds; 1910–1968), a White woman, at her dugout home, about a mile from Chickasha. Argo was in the Grady County jail while awaiting trial when, on May 31, 1930, a member of a White mob stormed the jail and fought National Guardsmen. Another unidentified member of the mob managed to shoot through the jail window, critically injuring Argo with a bullet through his skull. The shooter was said to have been Jud Brown. While Argo was laying wounded on a cot in the jail, G.W. Skinner (né George Washington Skinner; 1899–1960), husband of the accuser, plunged a knife into Argo's chest. Authorities took Argo to a nearby hospital where, reportedly, medical attendants refused aid. Argo, then unconscious and thought by the mob to be dead, was returned to the jail. He then was transferred to the University of Oklahoma Hospital in Oklahoma City, where he died May 31, 1930; 12:40 am. On May 21, 2021, Rev. Dr. Raushan Paul Ashanti-Alexander proposed that the City of Chickasha pass a resolution condemning the actions that led to Argo's death. Mayor Chris Mosley agreed to prepare the resolution.

== See also ==
- List of lynching victims in the United States
- Death (statue) (1935)

== Bibliography ==
=== News media ===
- California Eagle (June 20, 1930). "Texas Records Another Lynching". Vol. 43, no. 2. pp. 1 & 2 (columns 1 & 3) – via Newspapers.com. LCCN sn82-16196; OCLC 175312023 (all editions).
- Dallas Morning News, The (June 5, 1931). "McCasland Gets Two-Year Term in First of Sherman Riot Trials – Is Convicted of Arson of Burning Courthouse – Lynching Ignored". Vol. 46, no. 248. pp. 1, 12 (section 1) – via GenealogyBank.com.
- Dallas Morning News, The; Sanders, Ryan (May 21, 2021). "Opinion: Grayson County Is Struggling to Reckon With a Century-Old Lynching – The County Courthouse Honors a Lot of People but Leaves Out This One"..
- Davies, David (né Albert Ernest Davies III; born 1953) (host / interviewer); Swanson, Doug (né Douglas Jules Swanson; born 1953) (interviewee) (June 8, 2020). "Cult of Glory Reveals the Dark History of the Texas Rangers" (streaming archive of a radio broadcast → 36 minutes; and transcript). Fresh Air (book review: Cult of Glory). NPR; co-produced by WHYY Public Media. OCLC 1161980345.
- Express-Star, The (May 18, 2021). "Council Member Requests City Condemn 1930 Lynching in Chickasha" (online). Chickasha.
- Fort Worth Star-Telegram (September 13, 1930). "One Taken and the Other Left by Death Chair". The New York Age (AP). Vol. 50, no. 224 (Home ed.). p. 15 – via Newspapers.com.
- Fredericksburg Standard (July 3, 1931). "Sherman Rioter Given Two Years". Vol. 21, no. 41. Fredricksburg, Texas. p. 6 – via Newspapers.com. LCCN sn86089412 ; OCLC 14279865.
- Herald Democrat, The. Sherman, Texas.
1. Hunt, Donna (August 19, 2017). "Grayson's Statue Honors Confederate Dead". Archived from the original on June 8, 2021.
2. "Sherman Attorney Calls for Removal of Confederate Statue From Courthouse Lawn". June 16, 2020. Archived from the original on November 24, 2020.
3. "Petitions, Protests Continue Over Confederate Monument in Sherman". June 18, 2020. Archived from the original on November 24, 2020.
- KXII ⑫. Sherman, Texas.
1. Quatrino, Nina (May 24, 2021). "Awaiting Approval, Local Historians Push for Historical Marker of 1930 Sherman Riot".
2. Rangel, Lauren (October 12, 2021). "Grayson Co. Commissioners Approve Historical Marker for Sherman Riots of 1930".
3. Dedmon, Kylee (February 3, 2022). "Historical Marker for 1930 Sherman Riot Approved".
4. Hedgcoth, Austin (March 29, 2025). 'They Were Scared to Death to Recognize History': Marker for 1930 Sherman Riot Unveiled After Years-Long Battle".
- New York Age (June 28, 1930). "Third Texas Negro is Lynched by Mob in Past Month". Vol. 43, no. 42. p. 1 (column 7, bottom) – via Newspapers.com. LCCN sn83-30005; OCLC 9274417 (all editions).
- New York Daily News; Levins, Peter Thomas "Bud" (1896–1950) (May 3, 1931). "What Has Happened – How Barbarianism Reigned When Impatient Justice Boiled Over in the South". Vol. 12, no. 265 (Main ed.). New York. p. 36C – via Newspapers.com.
- New York Times (The). LCCN sn78-4456, LCCN sn00-61556; ISSN 0362-4331, ISSN 1553-8095 (online); OCLC 1645522 (all editions).
1. "Shoot Negro in Jail, Attack Guardsmen — Oklahoma Rioters Fire Building and Defy Machine Gun Volleys of Militia — Victim Dies in Hospital — Husband of Woman Accusing Prisoner Stabs Him as He Lies Unconscious–Four Arrested". Vol. 79, no. 26426. June 1, 1930. p. 23 (section 1). Retrieved June 6, 2021.
  1. NYTimes Archives → Blog.
  2. TimesMachine → Pdf (PDF); Permalink.
  3. Via Internet Archive (SIM Box ID: IA1661202, Canister no.: 53). IA Collection: SIM Microfilm; Periodicals; Pub New York Times.
- Tyler Morning Telegraph (December 29, 1934). "Man Convicted of Sherman Riot Is Freed of Prison" (AP). Vol. 57, no. 40. Tyler, Texas. p. 6 (column 4) – via Newspapers.com.
- Washington Post, The; Trent, Sydney (June 3, 2021). "Sherman Riot: In Texas, a Struggle to Memorialize a Brutal Lynching as Resistance Grows to Teaching Historical Racism – The Battle to Approve a Historical Marker in Sherman Comes Amid the State's Efforts to Limit the Teaching of Racism in Schools" (Retropolis – the history blog of the Washington Post). ISSN 2641-9599 (publication); ProQuest 2536670723 (U.S. Newsstream database) (article).
- Whitewright Sun (May 15, 1930). "Mob Burns Courthouse at Sherman." "Treason, Mob's Action Called". Vol. 51, no. 41. Whitewright, Texas: James Henry Waggoner (1884–1950) (editor and publisher). pp. 1, 7 – via Portal to Texas History. LCCN sn88083331 ; ISSN 0886-4322; OCLC 17542521 (all editions).

=== Books, journals, magazines, and papers ===
- Boessenecker, John (2016). Texas Ranger – The Epic Life of Frank Hamer, The Man Who Killed Bonnie and Clyde. St. Martin's Press. pp. 355–356, 358, 361, 363, 366, 370, 374, 376, 495 – via Google Books. LCCN 2015-48659; ISBN 978-1-4668-7986-7 (e-book); OCLC 1112255061 (all editions).
- Caldwell, Clifford Raymond; DeLord, Ronald Glenn (2015). "Cases Occurring After 1923 – Hughes, George". Eternity at the End of a Rope: Executions, Lynchings and Vigilante Justice in Texas, 1819–1923. Santa Fe: Sunstone Press. pp. 585–593. ISBN 978-1-6329-3088-0..
- Chapman, David Lynn (born 1948) (August 1973). Lynching in Texas (PDF) (M.A. thesis). Texas Tech University. OCLC 466141758, 797961552, 1004206874.
- Earsy, Nancy; Rothbaum, Victoria; Baum, Ann, eds. (2019). "CRRJ Docket 2019: Texas – William (Bill) Roan – Benchley, Brazos County, TX (June 19, 1930)". Civil Rights and Restorative Justice Project – Year End Report 2019 (see article: Civil Rights and Restorative Justice Project). Vol. 10. Northeastern University School of Law. p. 15.
- Gillette, Michael L. (April 1978). "The Rise of the NAACP in Texas". Southwestern Historical Quarterly. 81 (4). Texas State Historical Association: 393–416 – via Portal to Texas History. ISSN 0038-478X (publication); OCLC 38528646, 5542919727 (article).
- Hudy, Trayce Darter (né Trayce Leann Darter) (May 2001). "Chapter 3: Sherman, Texas, 1930". The Texas Guard During Martial Law and a State of Emergency: A Select Study Focusing on Galveston, Sherman, Beaumont and Texas City (PDF) (Master of Arts thesis). Denton: Texas Woman's University. pp. 76–116. OCLC 79885466 (all editions).
- Kumler, Donna Jean (December 1995). 'They Have Gone From Sherman': The Courthouse Riot of 1930 and Its Impact on the Black Professional Class (PDF) (PhD dissertation). Denton: University of North Texas. OCLC 35446823 (all editions).
- Landrum, Graham Gordon, PhD (1922–1995) (1960). "Things We Have Talked About". Grayson County; An Illustrated History of Grayson County, Texas (1st ed.). Fort Worth, Texas: University Supply & Equipment Company. pp. 92–94 – via The Portal to Texas History. LCCN 67-9213 (2nd ed.; 1967); OCLC 1144576893 (all editions).
- Murphy, Thomas Michael (August 1931). History of the Sherman Riot (Master's thesis). Austin College. OCLC 35242502 (all editions).
- Payne, Darwin, PhD (June 2017). "When Dallas Was the Most Racist City in America". D Magazine. "In the early 1920s [in Dallas], the city's chapter of the Ku Klux Klan once included one out of every three eligible men."
  → This article first appeared as "The Dallas Morning News and the Ku Klux Klan". Legacies: A History Journal for Dallas and North Central Texas. 9 (1): 16–27. Spring 1997 – via Portal to Texas History. ISSN 1071-0426; OCLC 759620677 (all editions).
- Phillips, Edward Hake, PhD (1918–2009) (September 1987). "The Sherman Courthouse Riot of 1930". East Texas Historical Journal. 25 (2): 12–19. ISSN 0424-1444.
- Pruden, Durward (1905–1998) (1935). "A Sociological Study of a Texas Lynching" (Master of Arts thesis). Southern Methodist University. OCLC 14987653.
- Raper, Arthur Franklin (1899–1979) (1933). The Tragedy of Lynching. Chapel Hill: University of North Carolina Press, Social Studies Series, presented by the Southern Commission on the Study of Lynching, sponsored, in part, by the Rosenwald Fund. pp. 125–138 – via HathiTrust. LCCN 33-9073 (1933), LCCN 69-14943 (1969); LCCN 72-90191 (1969), LCCN 69-16568 (1960), OCLC 2018078 (all editions), 1081157881, 1081157881, 1068181841.
→ Chapter 8: "'Red Boned Nigger From Louisiana' – Bryan, Brazos County, Texas". The University of North Carolina press. 1933. pp. 125–138.
→ Chapter 16: "Burning Down the Courthouse – Sherman, Grayson County, Texas". The University of North Carolina press. 1933. pp. 319–355.
→ Chapter 18: "Death in Cell by Gun and Knife, Chickasha Grady County, Oklahoma". The University of North Carolina press. 1933. pp. 369–383.
→ Chapter 22: "Foiling the Mob". "Collingsworth and Wheeler Counties". The University of North Carolina press. 1933. pp. 450–453.
- Swanson, Douglas Jules (2020). Cult of Glory: The Bold and Brutal History of the Texas Rangers. Viking Press. pp. 299–307. ISBN 978-1-1019-7988-4.
- Teague, Hollie A., PhD (July 5, 2018). "Black and Blue in North Texas: The Long Neglected History of Anti-Black Police Violence in North Texas, 1880–1930". Journal of Black Studies. 49 (8). SAGE Publications: 756–781. doi:10.1177/0021934718785631. ISSN 1552-4566. LCCN 77022565. OCLC 1799971. S2CID 149506941.
- Thompson, Nolan Herman (1995). "Sherman Riot of 1930". Handbook of Texas. Texas State Historical Association. OCLC 54906271 (all editions) (online), 259977569, 1048555490, 3095662, 560142789.
- Time.
1. White, Walter [Francis] (1893–1955) (June 9, 1930). National Affairs: No. 7. Vol. 15, no. 23.
2. White, Walter [Francis] (1893–1955) (June 23, 1930). Races: Lynching No. 7 (cont.). Vol. 15, no. 25.
3. White, Walter [Francis] (1893–1955) (October 27, 1930). Letters. Vol. 16, no. 17.
- "Francis Augustus Hamer, 1884–1955". Texas Ranger Hall of Fame and Museum. Waco. n.d. Archived from the original on February 18, 2022.

Government and genealogical archives

- "Texas Deaths, 1890–1976". FamilySearch (database with images). Texas State Board of Health, Department of Vital Statistics, Standard Certificate of Death (Form D), Registrar's No. 2674, re: "Henry H. Vaughan," date of death: September 12, 1932, San Antonio, Bexar County, Texas; citing certificate number 37090, Texas – Bureau of Vital Statistics, Office of the State Registrar, Austin; FHL Digital Folder No. 5145182, Image No. 93.

=== Other resources ===
- Bills, E.R. (2007). "9. Sherman Riot". Texas Far & Wide: "The Tornado With Eyes" – "Gettysburgs Last Casualty" – "The Celestial Skipping Stone" – and Other Tales. Arcadia Publishing. ISBN 978-1-4396-6305-9.
- Crabb, Myra Elizabeth (1987). The Killing of a Black Man: The Case of George Hughes (master's thesis). Commerce: East Texas State University. OCLC 17486299.
- Crabb, Beth (Winter–Spring 1990). "May 1930: White Man's Justice for a Black Man's Crime". The Journal of Negro History. 5 (1 & 2). University of Chicago Press: 29–40. doi:10.1086/JNHv75n1-2p29. ISSN 0022-2992. JSTOR 2717687. OCLC 9964196251. S2CID 149464408.
- Kumler, Donna (interviewer) (née Donna Jean Capps; born 1950); Bate, Alexander Ben (1905–1995) (interviewee) (September 19, 1986). Oral History Interview With Alexander Bate (Transcript: Oral History 0684). University of North Texas. OCLC 192073232.
- Kumler, Donna; Hill, William Henry (October 13, 1986). Oral History Interview With William Hill (Transcript: Oral History 0685). University of North Texas. OCLC 192072887.
- Kumler, Donna; Elliott, William Ralph (1913–1998) (interviewee) (November 14, 1986). Oral History Interview With Ralph Elliot (Transcript: Oral History 0687). University of North Texas. OCLC 192073062.
- Montgomery, Benjamin Andrew (born 1978) (2018). Chapter 7: "Rubble and Race". The Man Who Walked Backward: An American Dreamer's Search for Meaning in the Great Depression (limited preview). Little, Brown Spark – via Google Books. LCCN 2018-948994; ISBN 0-3164-3806-5, 978-0-3164-3806-3; OCLC 1019634559 (all editions).
- Niedermeier, Lynn Eleanor (born 1956) (2007). Eliza Calvert Hall: Kentucky Author and Suffragist (PDF) (note 13 on p. 261). Lexington: University Press of Kentucky. LCCN 2007-16756; ISBN 978-0-8131-2470-4; OCLC 1058643253 (all editions).
- Stevenson, Bob (producer/director) (1995). Sherman (VHS; 30 minutes). White Crane Video Productions – via Austin College Special Collection. OCLC 37399251 (all editions).
  This video is a collection of interviews, actual photographs, and live representations of the 1930 lynching of George Hughes and ensuing riot by Whites against Blacks in Sherman.

Interviewees:

1. Judge R.C. Vaughn (né Roland Carlisle Vaughn; 1915–2010)
2. Rev. Hulen Leon Jackson (1913–1997)
3. Judge William Ralph Elliot (1913–1998)
4. W.C. ("Jack") DeWitt (né William Clifford DeWitt; 1913–1999)
5. Jack Hannah (né Jack Henry Hannah; 1911–2000) (florist)
6. Carl Adams (né Carl Ray Adams; 1914–2000) (journalist)
7. Arthur Hickson (1904–1997)
- Valencia-García, Louie Dean, PhD (2020). Far-Right Revisionism and the End of History – Alt / Histories. Routledge. ISBN 978-0-3674-6008-2.
