= 1935 New York anti-lynching exhibitions =

The 1935 New York anti-lynching exhibitions were two separate but consecutive art exhibitions held in early 1935 by two different organizations, both in response to a 1934 bill in the United States Congress that dealt with lynching. The organizations involved were the NAACP and the Artists Union, the latter in conjunction with groups including the John Reed Club, the League of Struggle for Negro Rights, and the International Labor Defense.

== Organization and background ==
The first exhibition was an NAACP exhibition entitled An Art Commentary on Lynching and held at the Arthur U. Newton Galleries, from February 15 through March 2. It was covered by the NAACP's magazine, The Crisis, which in particular observed the additional publicity that accrued because of a last minute change of venue, a mere four days before the exhibition was due to open. It had been originally planned to be held in the Jacques Seligmann Galleries, but the Galleries pulled out stating to the NAACP that it would be unable to go through with the exhibit because of "political, social, and economic pressure", although Seligmann did not disclose whence this pressure originated. More than 3,000 people attended the exhibition.

The second exhibition was entitled Struggle for Negro Rights and organized by Artists' Union members in conjunction with the John Reed Club and several Communist groups including the League of Struggle for Negro Rights, the Vanguard Group of Harlem (the Marxist group with Louise Thompson Patterson and Augusta Savage), and the International Labor Defense. It ran from March 3 through March 16. In part because of the Harlem Renaissance, both exhibitions received support from Harlem artists and intellectuals.

They occurred back-to-back in early of 1935, and their joint purpose was to spur people to take up the cause of the Costigan–Wagner Bill in the U.S. Congress, among other anti-lynching legislation, which sought to make it an offense under federal law for law enforcement officers to take no action during the commission of a lynching (as they had, for example, in the lynching of John Carter). Walter White, leader of the NAACP, thought the visual arts would be a successful way to attract an audience and get them to support legislation. Politically the two organizations were rivals, and publicly at odds with each other; the Artists' Union advocated legislation that held individuals in lynch mobs responsible, demanding the death penalty, while the Costigan–Wagner Bill was aimed at officials who allowed the violence to take place. The Artists' Union took a more radical political stance than the NAACP, with the latter accusing the former of Communism, and the former accusing the latter of being bourgeois and ineffectual.

== Description of exhibited material and participating artists ==
Both exhibitions excluded actual photographs of lynchings, focusing rather on drawings, paintings, sculptures, and lithographs; and, out of 39 at the first exhibition and 45 at the second, had 5 artists in common. Works included Reginald Marsh's This Is Her First Lynching and George Bellows's The Law Is Too Slow, both used as illustrations in the NAACP exhibition catalogue, and others by John Steuart Curry and Thomas Hart Benton; with the NAACP's exhibition tending towards explicit imagery whilst the Artists' Union exhibition tending towards symbolism. In part, the exclusion of photographs was because they were not considered high art; but in other part it was also because photographs of a lynching were viewed by the exhibitors as participant actions and commercial enterprises seeking financial gain from lynchings. The exhibitors saw that latter in particular as not compatible with their goals of political action against lynching.

The five artists represented in both exhibitions were Harry Sternberg, Sam Becker, Aaron Goodelman, José Clemente Orozco, and Isamu Noguchi. The realism of some of the artwork was overwhelming for some visitors to the NAACP exhibition, and was decried as details that people could be spared from by one reviewer. Noguchi's Death was particularly singled out for its grisly realism by reviewers, criticized (for example) for "aesthetic opportunism", and for being "macabre" and "bizarre", by Art News; and in response to this and some overtly racist criticism Noguchi removed it from the NAACP exhibition on the fourth day and instead displayed it at the Artists' Union exhibition. Orozco's Negros Colgados (Hanged Negros) lithograph was also displayed at both exhibitions, submitted by his dealer Alma Reed.

Other artworks included Sternberg's Southern Holiday, Paul Cadmus's To The Lynching!, three of Curry's works (Manhunt, and The Fugitive in oil and as a lithograph), Benton's A Lynching, E. Simms Campbell's I Passed Along This Way in charcoal,Louis Lozowick's Hold the Fort, Hyman J. Warsager's The Law, and two linocut prints by Hale Woodruff (Giddap! and By Parties Unknown).

== Sources ==
- "An Art Exhibit Against Lynching". The Crisis. April 1935.
- Wolff, R.M. (2016). "Persons Unknown: lynching photographs in the Museum". In Stylianou, Elena; Stylianou-Lambert, Theopisti (eds.). Museums and Photography: Displaying Death. Taylor & Francis. ISBN 9781317528975.
- Apel, Dora (2004). "The Anti-Lynching Exhibitions of 1935". Imagery of Lynching: Black Men, White Women, and the Mob. Rutgers University Press. ISBN 9780813534596.
- Langa, Helen (1999). "Two Antilynching Art Exhibitions: Politicized Viewpoints, Racial Perspectives, Gendered Constraints". American Art. 13 (1): 10–39. doi:10.1086/424334. JSTOR 3109305. S2CID 192126647.
- Lewis, Todd E. (1993). "Mob Justice in the 'American Congo': 'Judge Lynch' in Arkansas during the Decade after World War I". The Arkansas Historical Quarterly. 52 (2): 156–184. doi:10.2307/40019247. JSTOR 40019247.
- Cullen, Deborah, ed. (2009). Nexus New York: Latin/American Artists in the Modern Metropolis. Museo del Barrio. ISBN 9780300158960.
