= 1930 United States Senate election in Colorado =

- November 4, 1930
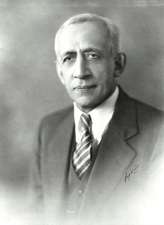

Nominee	Edward P. Costigan	George H. Shaw
Party	Democratic	Republican
Popular vote	180,028	137,487
Percentage	55.85%	42.65%
- County results Costigan: 40–50% 50–60% 60–70% Shaw: 40–50% 50–60% 60–70%
U.S. senator before election
Lawrence C. Phipps
Republican
Elected U.S. Senator
Edward P. Costigan
Democratic

The 1930 United States Senate election in Colorado took place on November 4, 1930. Republican Senator Lawrence C. Phipps declined to run for re-election, resulting in an open race to replace him. Edward P. Costigan, one of the founding members of the Progressive Party in Colorado and a former member of the United States Tariff Commission, won the Democratic nomination and faced attorney George H. Shaw, the Republican nominee, in the general election. Aided by the nationwide Democratic landslide, Costigan handily defeated Shaw, becoming the first Democrat elected to the Senate from Colorado since 1914.

== Democratic primary ==
=== Candidates ===
- Edward P. Costigan, former Member of the United States Tariff Commission
- Morrison Shafroth, attorney and son of former Governor and U.S. Senator John F. Shafroth, 1924 Democratic nominee for the U.S. Senate
- James A. Marsh, former City Attorney of Denver

=== Results ===
Democratic primary results
Party	Candidate	Votes	%
Democratic	Edward P. Costigan	24,698	51.61
Democratic	Morrison Shafroth	15,819	33.06
Democratic	James A. Marsh	7,337	15.33
Total votes		47,854	100.00

== Republican primary ==
=== Candidates ===
- George H. Shaw, Denver attorney
- William V. Hodges, Denver attorney

=== Results ===
Republican primary results
Party	Candidate	Votes	%
Republican	George H. Shaw	63,112	56.27
Republican	William V. Hodges	49,043	43.73
Total votes		112,155	100.00

== General election ==
=== Results ===
1930 United States Senate special election in Colorado
Party	Candidate	Votes	%	±%
Democratic	Edward P. Costigan	180,028	55.85%	+11.96%
Republican	George H. Shaw	137,487	42.65%	−7.54%
Socialist	Morton Alexander	1,745	0.54%	+0.05%
Farmer–Labor	H. H. Marrs	1,367	0.42%	−4.62%
Communist	James Allander	924	0.29%	−0.09%
Democratic Liberal	Frank H. Rice	451	0.14%	–
Commonwealth Party	James Allander	339	0.11%	–
Majority		42,541	13.20%	+6.90%
Turnout		322,341		
Democratic gain from Republican				
