= Jones–Costigan amendment =

The Jones-Costigan Amendment, also known as the Sugar Act of 1934, passed on May 9, 1934 was an amendment to the Agricultural Adjustment Act that reclassified sugar crop as basic commodity, subject to the provisions of the Agricultural Adjustment Act enacted the previous year. Sponsored by Senator Edward P. Costigan (D-CO) and Representative John Marvin Jones (D-TX), the act was a New Deal effort to salvage an ailing sugar industry by imposing protective tariffs and quotas along with a direct subsidy to growers of sugar cane and sugar beet.

== Background ==
Declining agricultural prices preceded the Stock Market Crash of 1929, commonly associated with the start of the worldwide Great Depression that lasted through the 1930s. By 1931, sugar prices had fallen from a pre-Depression level of 7 cents per pound to just one and one half cents per pound.

The US market for sugar was the largest in the world, consuming some 6,000,000 tons per year. Of this, the US sugar industry supplied only about a third, while the rest consisted of foreign imports. Within the US itself, sugar production was divided between two industries; sugar cane producers along the coast and on Caribbean and Pacific islands, and sugar beet producers on the mainland.

In the early 20th century, sugar beet workers were primarily Polish, Belgian, and Hungarian immigrant families. Following the Immigration Act of 1924, which cut off most European immigration, growers turned to workers of Mexican descent. The trend became still more widespread when American Federation of Labor organized beet workers struck for higher wages in Blissfield Michigan in 1935. These workers migrated from Texas and included individuals who had been born on US soil, those who had entered the US legally and those who lacked legal resident standing. Regardless of citizenship status, maltreatment of these workers was widespread by both employers and government authorities. Employer intimidation was commonplace and workers were often fined for made-up infractions so as not to receive even the low pay they had been promised. Overcrowding and unsanitary living conditions were pervasive. Such conditions received growing attention as public health departments became burdened with the cost of care and quarantine. In Saginaw Michigan the Mexican population, accounting for just one and one half percent of the population, suffered 25% of all tuberculosis cases, at a cost to the county of some $18,000 in 1937.

President Franklin Delano Roosevelt outlined Six objectives of the Jones-Costigan Act: 1) To ensure "fair returns" to sugar beet and sugar cane producers. This was to be achieved through a two-pronged approach of limiting the sugar supply to aid in a recovery of market prices, and a direct subsidy to be given to sugar producers. 2) To assure laborers in the sugar industry a share in the benefits of the program, by conditioning benefits on the elimination of child labor and the payment of wages deemed fair and equitable. 3) To stabilize sugar prices by limiting production. 4) To "stabilize" or limit sugar production in the Philippines, Hawaii, Puerto Rico and the Virgin Islands at levels commensurate with US demand. 5) To stop the decline of Cuban sugar exports to the US. This was also to serve to rejuvenate Cuban consumption of American goods. 6) To enable the Secretary of Agriculture to mediate disputes between growers, processors, and laborers.

The Act authorized the Federal Surplus Relief Commission to purchase surplus beet sugar using proceeds from the processing tax. This sugar was used in foods distributed to the unemployed, in an attempt to alleviate widespread hunger.

== Impact ==
Citing increased returns to both sugar growers and processors, wage increases, and the near elimination of child labor in the industry, while consumer prices rose modestly but did not exceed levels comparable to pre-Depression levels, Roosevelt declared the program a short-term success. US exports to Cuba increased 140% from 1933 to 1935 under a reciprocal trade agreement that lowered trade barriers between the US and Cuba.

In an effort to protect mainland sugar growers, the Jones-Costigan Act imposed quotas on both Caribbean nations under the American sphere of influence and American territories themselves. Outraged by these restrictions, Hawaiian plantation owners began issuing calls for statehood.

According to Kent Hendrickson in 1964, the New Deal laws had a major impact on sugar beet farming in the Great Plains. They improved working conditions but were written primarily to aid the growers and the sugar processing mills. Much of the work was done by migrant Mexicans, who faced low wages, child labor and poor housing.

== Criticism ==
Despite early recovery in Cuba, critics noted that the nature of the quota, which was reset each year and subject to considerable change, disrupted the whole of the Cuban economy, dominated as it was by the single crop. Due to the high fixed cost of planting sugar cane, a planter would need several years to recover outlays and earn a profit. Yet, with no guarantee of a market for additional sugar yields, investment was lower than it would have been under a system in which planters could make accurate long-term assessments of demand. Prices rose from the implementation of the act, and dispute exists about whether this was a good or bad outcome. One critic noted in 1956 that the typical American consumer continued to pay some 50% more for sugar than did the average consumer in the world market.

Among the harshest criticisms was a 1961 allegation that the Jones-Costigan Act had established "a government-created cartel that goes well beyond the controls imposed in any other sector of American private enterprise."

== United States v. Butler ==
The 1934 version of the Jones-Costigan Act was overturned in 1936 when the Supreme Court ruled the Agricultural Adjustment Act unconstitutional in United States v. Butler. The bill contained a subsidy for growers, supported by a tax levied on processors. In the case of sugar, the tax amounted to one half cent per pound. It was the imposition of this tax that Justice Owen Roberts cited as unconstitutional. Congress reaffirmed the tariff and quota portions of the bill the same year, and adopted a new Sugar Act in 1937. The period 1933 to 1937 saw a fierce battle for power between the president and the Supreme Court, during which the court struck down numerous provisions of the New Deal. This came to a head in 1937 with the proposal of a Judicial Procedures Reform Bill commonly known as the Court Packing Scheme. Frustrated by what he regarded as obstructionism by the Supreme Court, Roosevelt threatened simply to appoint additional Justices sympathetic to his programs, whose votes would override those of the sitting justices. The proposal never came to pass, but the court became more docile. The 1937 Sugar Act stood.
