= Reginald Marsh (artist) =

American painter (1898– 1954)

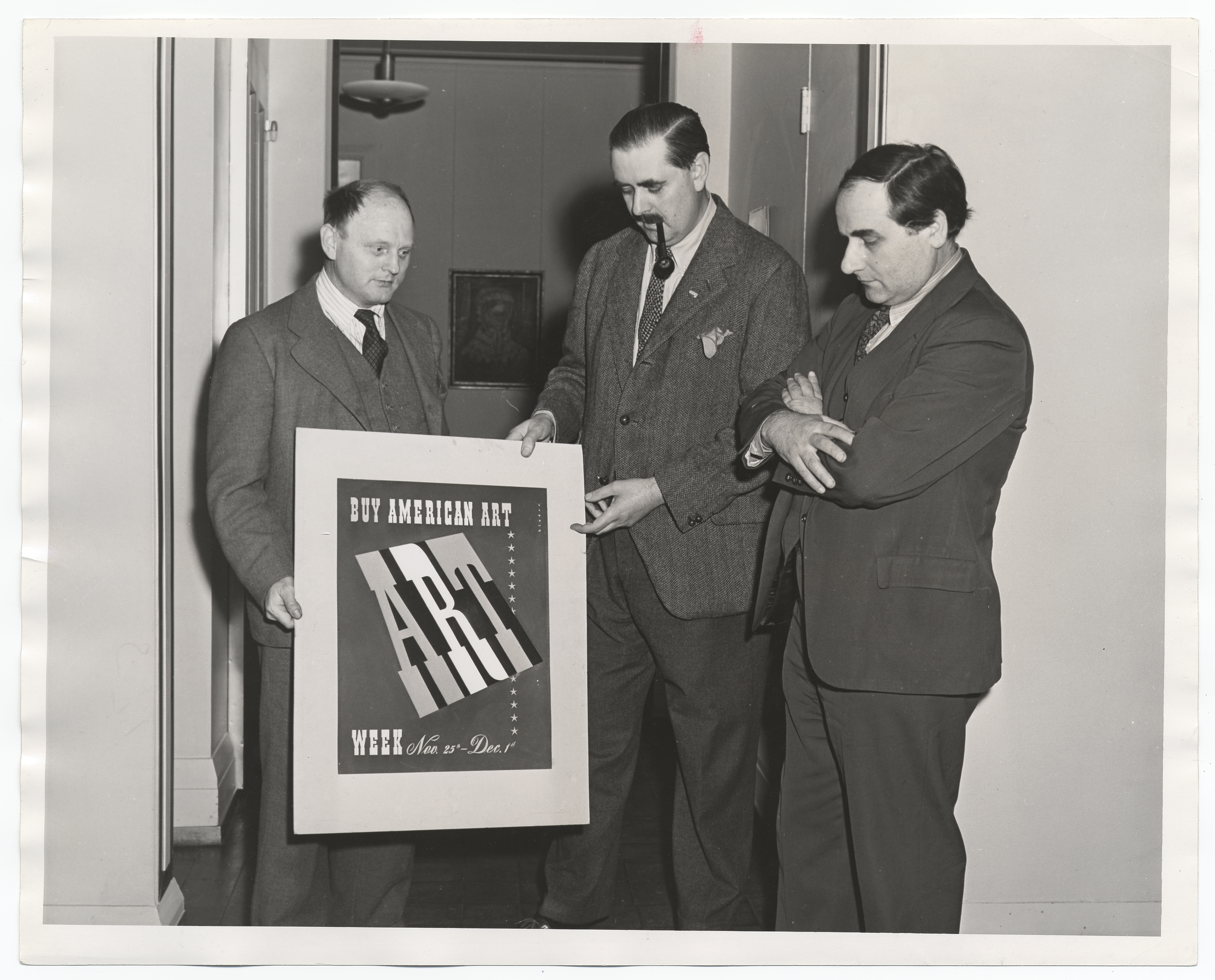
- Reginald Marsh (at left), Louis Bouche, and William Zorach
- Born: March 14, 1898; Paris, France
- Died: July 3, 1954 (aged 56); Dorset, Vermont, US
- Known for: Painter
- Notable work: Breadline (1930); Girl on Merry Go Round (1946); Pip and Flip (1932); Tattoo Haircut-Shave (1932); Why Not Use the 'L'? (1930)
- Movement: Social realism

Reginald Marsh (March 14, 1898 – July 3, 1954) was an American painter, born in Paris, most notable for his depictions of life in New York City in the 1920s and 1930s. Crowded Coney Island beach scenes, popular entertainments such as vaudeville and burlesque, women, and jobless men on the Bowery are subjects that reappear throughout his work. He painted in egg tempera and in oils, and produced many watercolors, ink and ink wash drawings, and prints.

== Biography ==
=== Childhood and education ===
Reginald Marsh was born in an apartment in Paris above the Café du Dome. He was the second son born to American parents who were both artists. His mother, Alice Randall, was a miniaturist painter and his father, Frederick Dana Marsh, was a muralist and one of the earliest American painters to depict modern industry. The family was well off; Marsh's paternal grandfather had made a fortune in the meat packing business. When Marsh was two years old, his family moved to Nutley, New Jersey, where his father acquired a studio home located on The Enclosure, a street that had been established as an artists' colony some decades earlier by the American painter Frank Fowler. Marsh later acquired an estate in Woodstock, New York, where the family spent most of their summers.

Marsh attended the Lawrenceville School and graduated in 1920 from Yale University. At Yale Art School he worked as the star illustrator and cartoonist for campus humor magazine The Yale Record. Marsh was noted to have fully enjoyed his time at Yale. He moved to New York after graduation, where his ambition was to find work as a freelance illustrator. In 1922, he was hired to sketch vaudeville and burlesque performers for a regular New York Daily News feature, and when The New Yorker began publication in 1925, Marsh and fellow Yale Record alum Peter Arno were among the magazine's first cartoonists. Although not primarily remembered as a cartoonist, he was a prolific and thoughtful contributor to The New Yorker from 1925 to 1944. He also created illustrations for the New Masses (an American Marxist journal published from the 1920s to the 1940s).

=== Training and influences ===
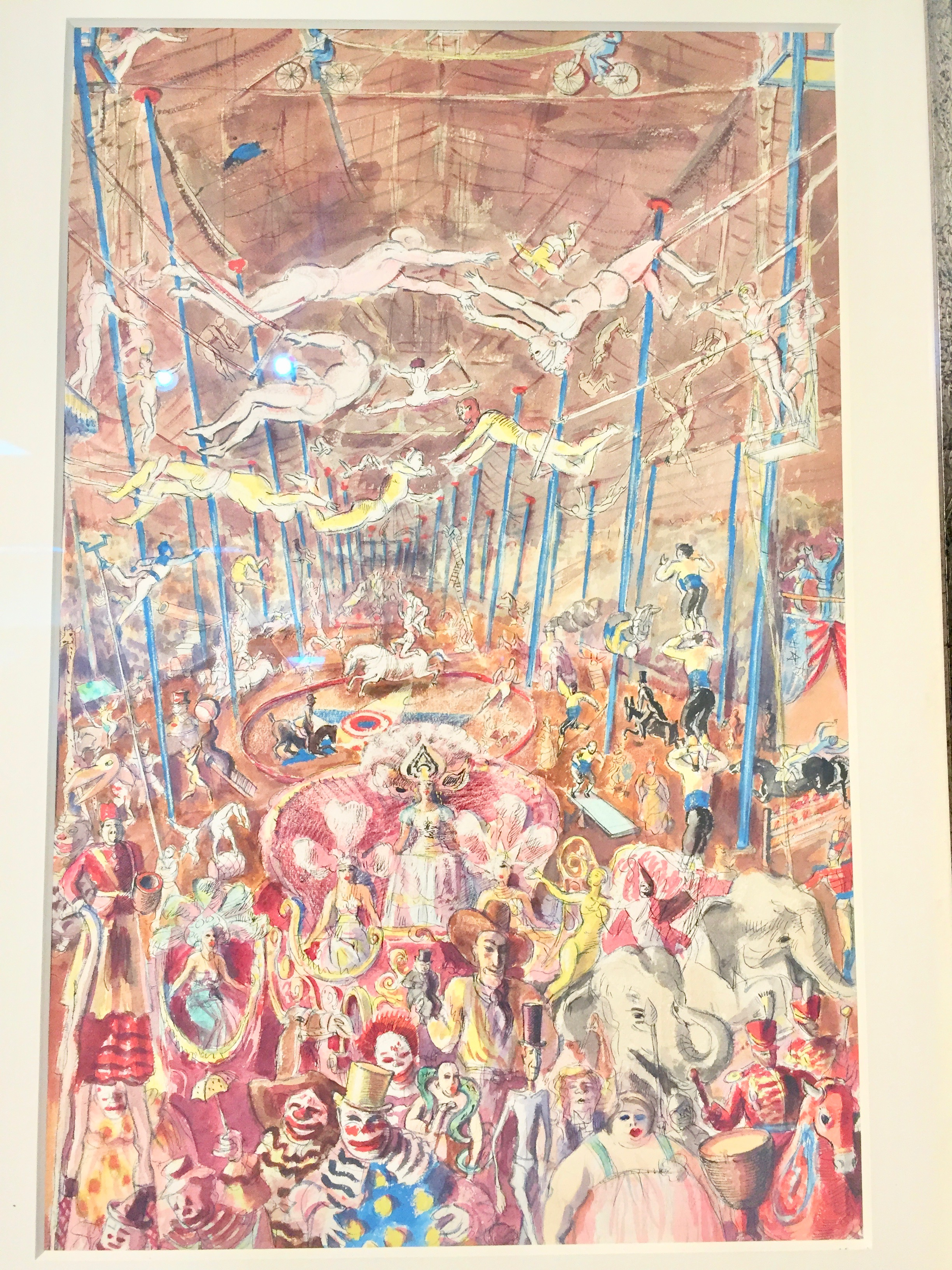
The Trapezist, The New Yorker magazine cover, April 27, 1935.

A casual interest in learning to paint led Marsh, in 1921, to begin taking classes at the Art Students League of New York, where his first teacher was John Sloan. By 1923 Marsh began to paint seriously. In this year he also married Betty Burroughs, another student at the college and daughter to artist Bryson Burroughs. The marriage ended in divorce in 1933. In 1925, Marsh visited Paris for the first time since he had lived there as a child and he fell in love with what the city had to offer him. Although Marsh had appreciated the drawings of Raphael, Leonardo da Vinci and Michelangelo since he was a child—his father's studio was full of reproductions of the old masters' work—the famous paintings that he saw at the Louvre and other museums stimulated in him a new fascination with those painters.

While exploring the works of European painters such as Titian, Tintoretto, and Rubens, Marsh met Thomas Hart Benton in one of the galleries in France. Benton, known today as a social realist, and regionalist painter, was also a great student of the Baroque masters. The resemblance Marsh saw between Tintoretto's famous works and Benton's motivated Marsh to try to paint in a similar way. Following his European trip (in which he also visited Florence) Marsh returned to New York with a desire to utilize the principles he felt were evident in the art of the Renaissance painters—particularly the way large groups of figures, together with architecture or landscape elements, were organized into stable compositions.

Marsh then studied under Kenneth Hayes Miller and George Luks, and chose to do fewer commercial assignments. Miller, who taught at the Art Students League of New York, instructed Marsh on the basics of form and design, and encouraged Marsh to make himself known to the world. He looked at Marsh's early, awkward burlesque sketches and at his more conventional landscape watercolors and said, "These awkward things are your work. These are real. Stick to these things and don't let anyone dissuade you!" By the beginning of the 1930s Marsh began to express himself fully in his art. As late as 1944, Marsh wrote, "I still show him every picture I paint. I am a Miller student."

Marsh began to work with John Steuart Curry after his training with Miller. Both Marsh and Curry took lessons from Jacques Maroger, whom Marsh met in New York City in 1940. Maroger, who was a former restorer at the Louvre, believed he had discovered the secrets of the old masters and was well known for his advocacy of a painting medium made by cooking white lead in linseed oil. Maroger provided a body of material documenting his work for Marsh and Curry to study, and they adopted his ideas.

== Marsh at work ==
Marsh's etchings were his first work as an artist. In the early 1920s, he also made several linocuts, and later produced lithographs and engravings. He kept careful watch of the technique he used for his prints, noting the temperature of the room, the age of the bath that his plates were soaked in, the composition, and the length of time the plate was etched. When making prints of the etchings Marsh recorded how long the paper soaked for, the heating of the plate, and the nature of the ink used. Marsh enjoyed experimentation with all his artworks and was therefore renowned for his unique techniques. In the early 1920s, he began to work with watercolor and oil. He did not take to oil naturally and decided to stick to watercolor for the next decade. Yet, in 1929 he discovered egg tempera, which he found to be somewhat like watercolor but with more depth and body.

== Subjects ==
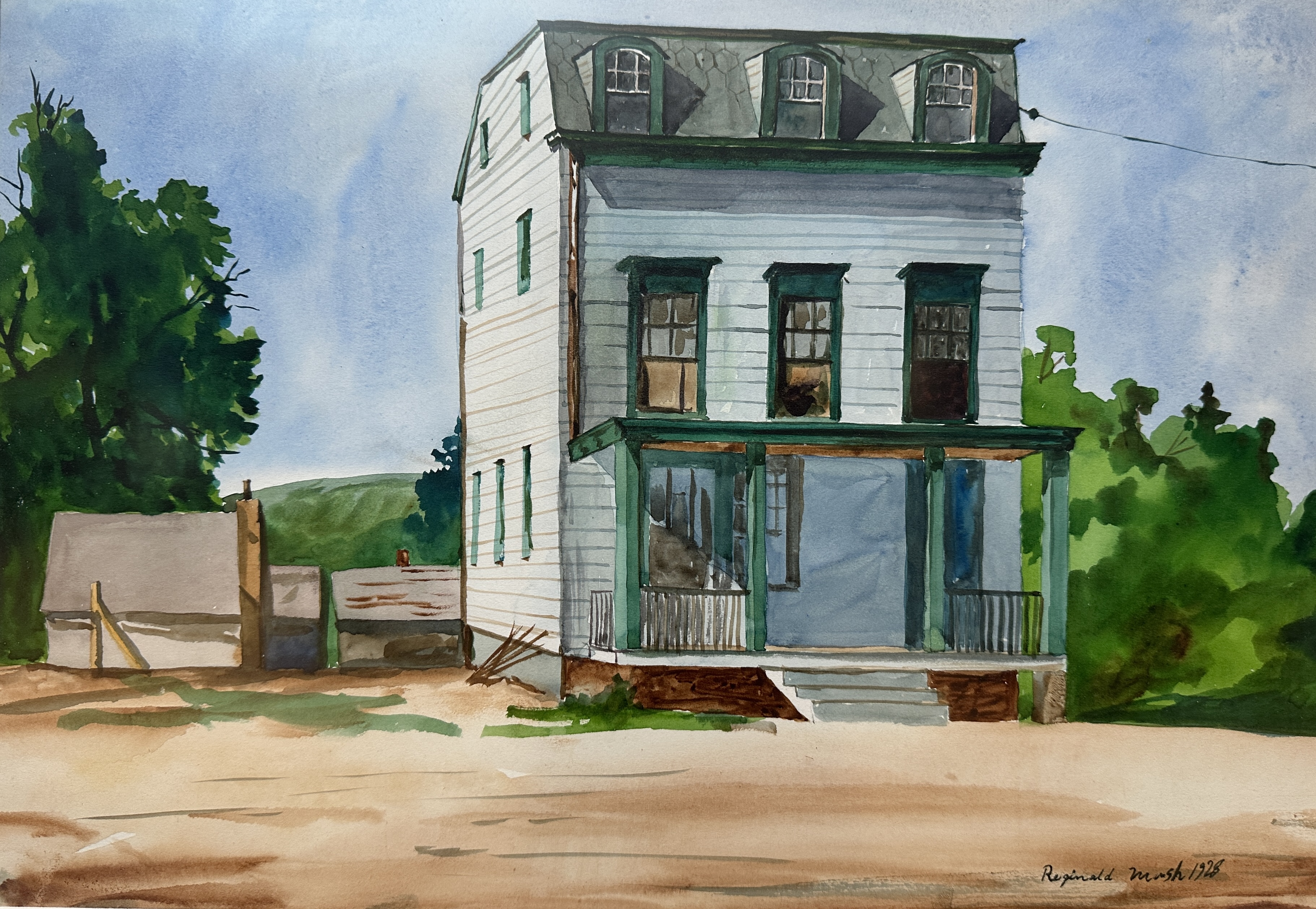
The Green House (1920s), Washington County Museum of Fine Arts

Reginald Marsh rejected modern art, which he found sterile. Marsh's style can best be described as social realism. His work depicted the Great Depression and a range of social classes whose division was accentuated by the economic crash. His figures are generally treated as types. "What interested Marsh was not the individuals in a crowd, but the crowd itself ... In their density and picturesqueness, they recall the crowds in the movies of Preston Sturges or Frank Capra".

Marsh's main attractions were the burlesque stage, the hobos on the Bowery, crowds on city streets and at Coney Island, and women. His deep devotion to the old masters led to his creating works of art in a style that reflects certain artistic traditions, and his work often contained religious metaphors. "It was upon the Baroque masters that Marsh based his own human comedy", inspired by the past but residing in the present. The burlesque queen in the etching Striptease at New Gotham (1935) assumes the classic Venus Pudica pose; elsewhere, "Venuses and Adonises walk the Coney Island beach [and] deposed Christs collapse on the Bowery". The painting Fourteenth Street (1934, in the Museum of Modern Art, New York) depicts a large crowd in front of a theater hall, in a tumbling arrangement that recalls a Last Judgment.

Marsh filled sketchbooks with drawings made on the street, in the subway, or at the beach. Marilyn Cohen calls Marsh's sketchbooks "the foundation of his art. They show a passion for contemporary detail and a desire to retain the whole of his experience". He drew not only figures but costumes, architecture, and locations. He made drawings of posters and advertising signs, the texts of which were copied out along with descriptions of the colors and use of italics. In the early 1930s he took up photography as another means of note taking.

Signage, newspaper headlines, and advertising images are often prominent in Marsh's finished paintings, in which color is used to expressive ends—drab and brown in Bowery scenes; lurid and garish in sideshow scenes.

=== Burlesque and the Bowery ===
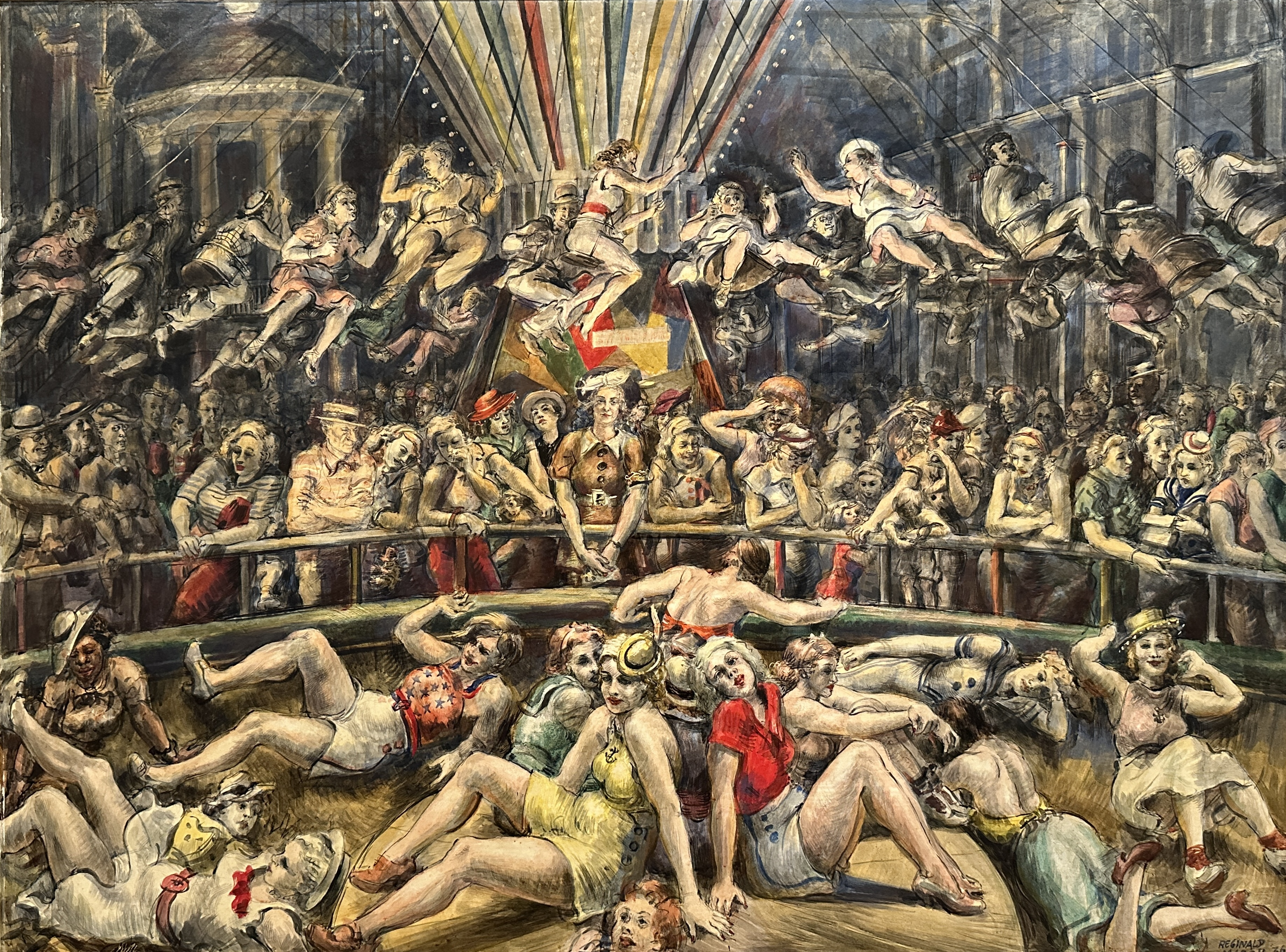
George C. Tilyou's Steeplechase Park (1936), Hirshhorn Museum

The drawings of burlesque and vaudeville acts Marsh made in the 1920s for the New York Daily News are among the first of his many images of popular theater. Such entertainments flourished throughout the country and were available all over New York City. The burlesque that Marsh captured can be described as raunchy and vulgar, but also comedic and satiric. Marsh's drawings depict chorus girls, clowns, theater goers and strippers. Burlesque was "the theater of the common man; it expressed the humor, and fantasies of the poor, the old, and the ill-favored." Marsh continued his burlesque sketches during his trip to Paris in 1925.

In 1930, Marsh was well off; he was successful in his career and had inherited a portion of his grandfather's money. Nonetheless, the lower class members of society were his preferred subject matter, as he contended that "well bred people are no fun to paint". Marsh's Bowery scenes depict people who had a crisis thrust upon them, which is why his work shows a loss of human integrity and control in all aspects. His etching Bread Line—No One Has Starved (1932) depicts a row of men in a frieze-like arrangement that emphasizes their immobility. (The print's title mocks a complacent remark made by President Hoover.)

=== Coney Island and sea ports ===
Marsh liked to venture to Coney Island to paint, especially in the summer time. There he began to paint massed beached bodies. Marsh emphasizes the bold muscles and build of his characters, which relate to the heroic scale of the older European paintings. Marsh said "I like to go to Coney Island because of the sea, the open air, and the crowds—crowds of people in all directions, in all positions, without clothing, moving—like the great compositions of Michelangelo and Rubens."

Marsh was drawn to the ports of New York. In the 1930s, the harbors were extremely busy with people and commerce due to the country's necessity for economic recovery. The Great Depression brought about a decline in raw materials and therefore the demand for those materials grew dramatically, resulting in bustling harbors in big cities such as New York. Marsh would sketch the seaports, focusing on the tugboats coming in and out of the harbor, and capturing the details of the boats such as the masts, the bells, the sirens, and the deck chairs.

=== New York City crowds and women ===
As on Coney Island, Marsh captured the crowds of the inner city life. Marsh spent a lot of his time on the sidewalks, the subways, the nightclubs, bars and restaurants finding the crowds. He also loved to single people out on the trains, in the parks, or in ballrooms to capture a single human figure in isolation from the rest of the city.

Marsh was obsessed with the American woman as a sexual and powerful figure. In the 1930s during the Great Depression, more than 2 million women lost their jobs, and women were said to be exploited sexually. Marsh's work shows this exploitation by portraying men and women in the same paintings. The women may be half clothed or fully naked, and are purposeful and strong; the men are voyeurs, often less imposing than the women. According to art historian Marilyn Cohen, "[Marsh's] world is filled with display: movies, burlesque, the beach, and all forms of public exhibition. Men and women are both spectators and performers within a heavily sexualized world. And Marsh was clearly fascinated by both aspects of that world—almost always presenting its two sides in the same image."

== Later life ==
His work was part of the art competitions at the 1932 Summer Olympics and the 1936 Summer Olympics.

During the 1940s and for many years, Marsh became an important teacher at the Art Students League of New York, which ran a summer camp where Marsh's students included Roy Lichtenstein. Lichtenstein was influenced by Marsh's subject matter in his work. Also in the '40s, Marsh began making drawings for magazines such as Esquire, Fortune, and Life. A degree of mannerism is apparent in his later paintings, in which wraithlike figures "float in a watery netherworld" in a deeper pictorial space than that of his compositions of the 1930s.

Shortly before his death he received the Gold Medal for Graphic Arts awarded by the American Academy and the National Institute for Arts and Letters. Marsh died from a heart attack in Dorset, Vermont, on July 3, 1954.

== Legacy ==
Many prints and unpublished sketches were found in his estate after he died. Marsh had kept good records, often daily, of his work, and thus organizing and publishing these works was made easy. A set of prints that were acquired by William Benton from Marsh's wife are now all in the William Benton Museum of Art, the New York Public Library, and the Middendorf Gallery in Washington, D.C.

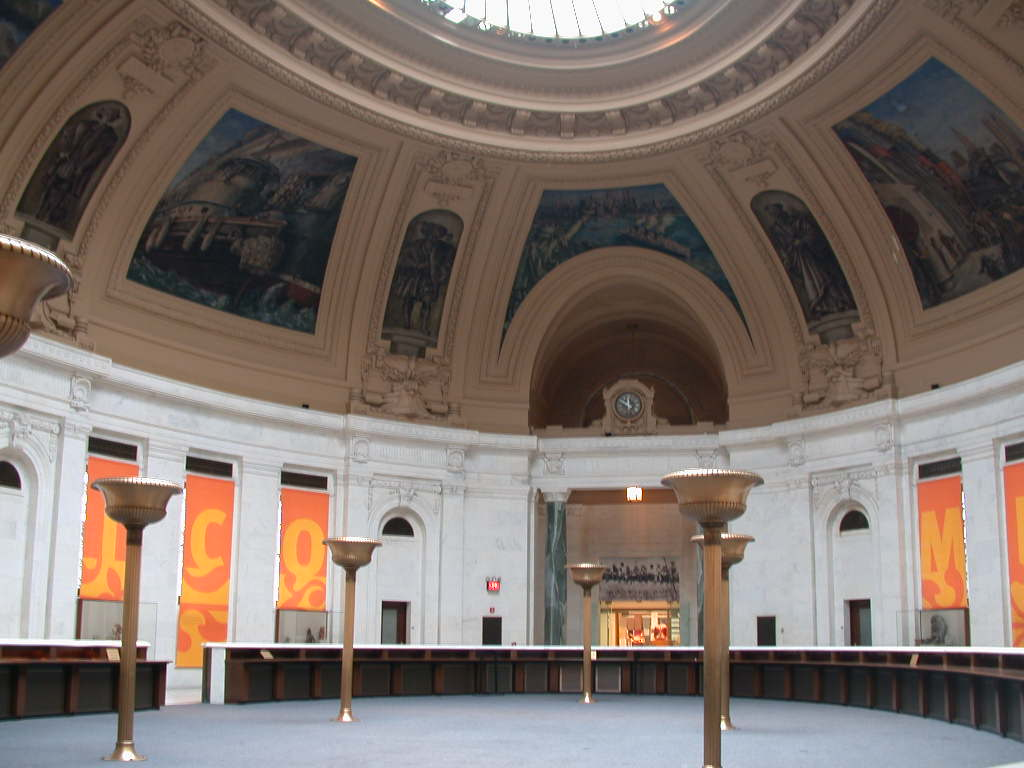
Marsh's murals in the rotunda of the Alexander Hamilton U.S. Custom House, 1937

== Selected works ==
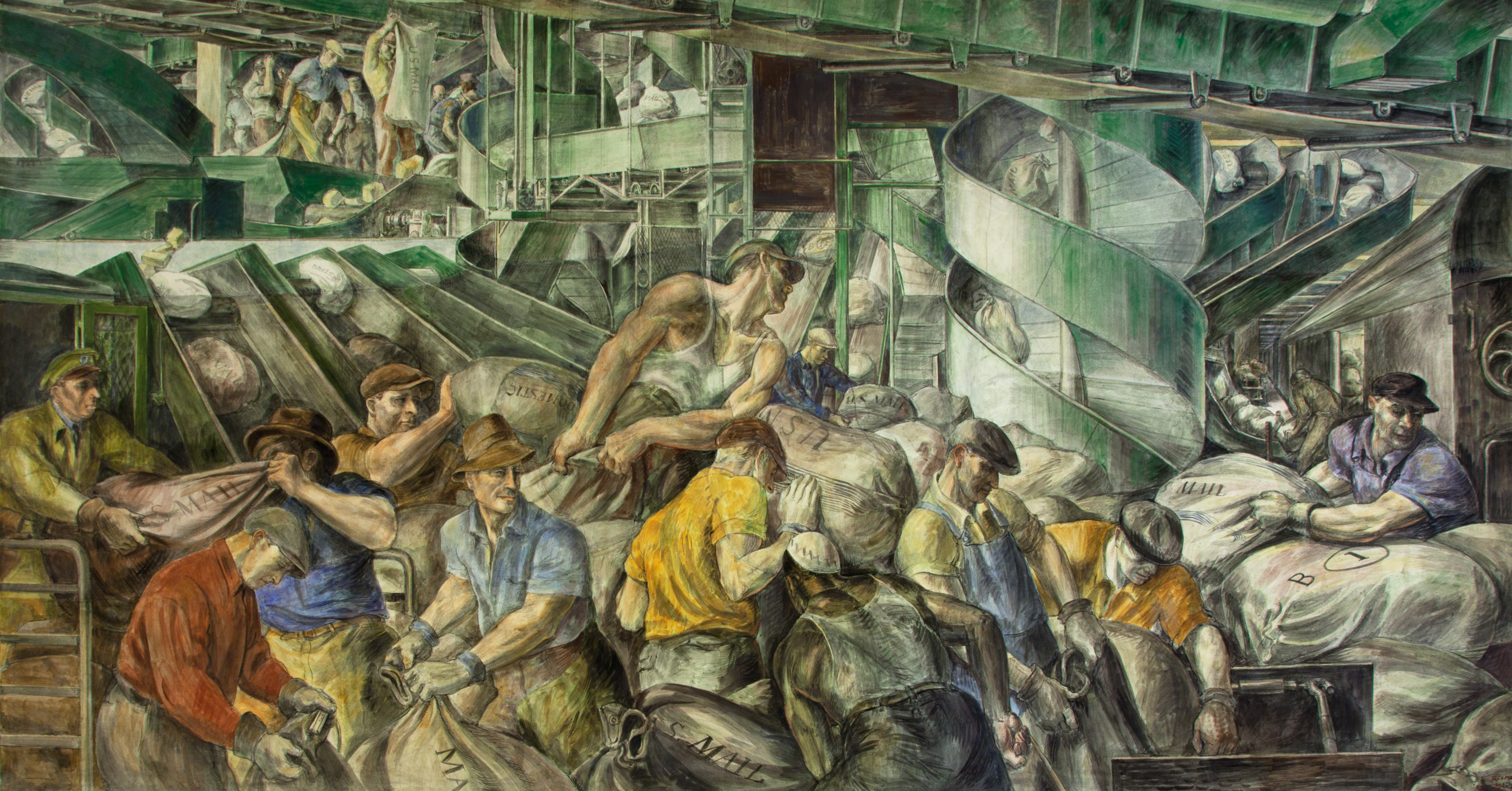
Sorting the Mail (1936), Mural in the William Jefferson Clinton Federal Building

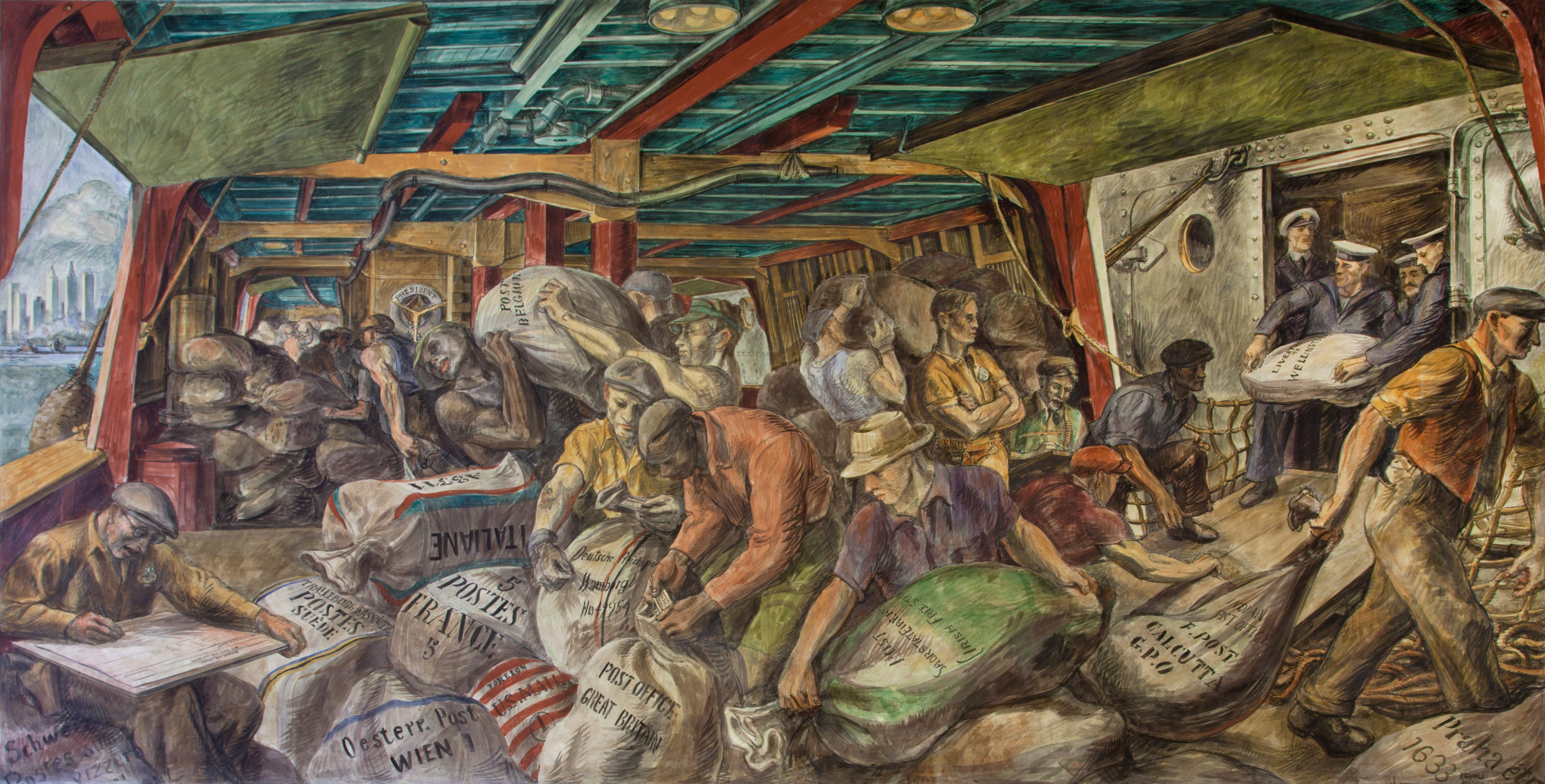
Unloading the Mail, Mural in the William Jefferson Clinton Federal Building

- Why Not Use the L?, Whitney Museum of American Art, 1930
- High Yaller, Private Collection, 1936
- Pip and Flip, Terra Foundation for American Art, 1932
- Tattoo Haircut-Shave, Art Institute of Chicago, 1932
- This Is Her First Lynching, published in The New Yorker in 1934 and then used prominently in the 1935 New York anti-lynching exhibitions
- Locomotives, Jersey City, Smithsonian American Art Museum, 1934
- Woman Walking, Arizona State University Art Museum, 1945
- A Paramount Picture, Collection of Marjorie and Charles Benton, 1934
- Twenty-Cent Movie, Whitney Museum of American Art, 1936
- Coney Island Bathers, Minneapolis Institute of Art, c. 1946
- In the Surf – Coney Island, Collection of Mr & Mrs. Lloyd Goodrich, 1946
- Girl on Merry Go Round, Collection of Mrs. Reginald Marsh, 1946
- Mural cycle in the rotunda of the Alexander Hamilton U.S. Custom House, New York City, 1937
  - On these murals, Marsh worked alongside eight assistants: Xavier J. Barile, Lloyd Lozes Goff, Mary Fife Lining, Ludwig Mactarian, Oliver M. Baker, John Poehler, J. Walkely, and E. Volsung.
- Savoy Ballroom, Detroit Institute of Arts, 1931
- Breadline, Smithsonian Institution, 1930
- Striptease at New Gotham, William Benton Museum of Art, 1935
- Steeplechase, Collection of Edward Laning, 1954
- The Bowl, The Brooklyn Museum, 1933
- Coney Island (Russia declares war on Japan), Collection of Marjorie and Charles Benton
- Down at Jimmy Kelly's, The Chrysler Museum, 1936
- Jelkye Trial Series, Boca Raton Museum of Art, 1951

== Exhibitions ==
- 1938, Solo Exhibition, Frank K. M. Rehn Galleries, New York
- 1957, 70 Photographers Look at New York, Museum of Modern Art
- 1997, Reginald Marsh at D.C Moore, New York City
- 2003, April 18 – May 25, New York City Drawings, Seraphin Galleries, Philadelphia
- 2006, February 19 – May 14, Reginald Marsh, Nassau County Museum of Art, New York
- 2013, June 21 – September 1, Swing Time: Reginald Marsh and Thirties New York, New-York Historical Society, New York

== See also ==
- American realism
- Ashcan School
- Social Realism
- American scene painting
- Regionalism (art)
