= Amy Lyford =

American professor of art history (born 1963)

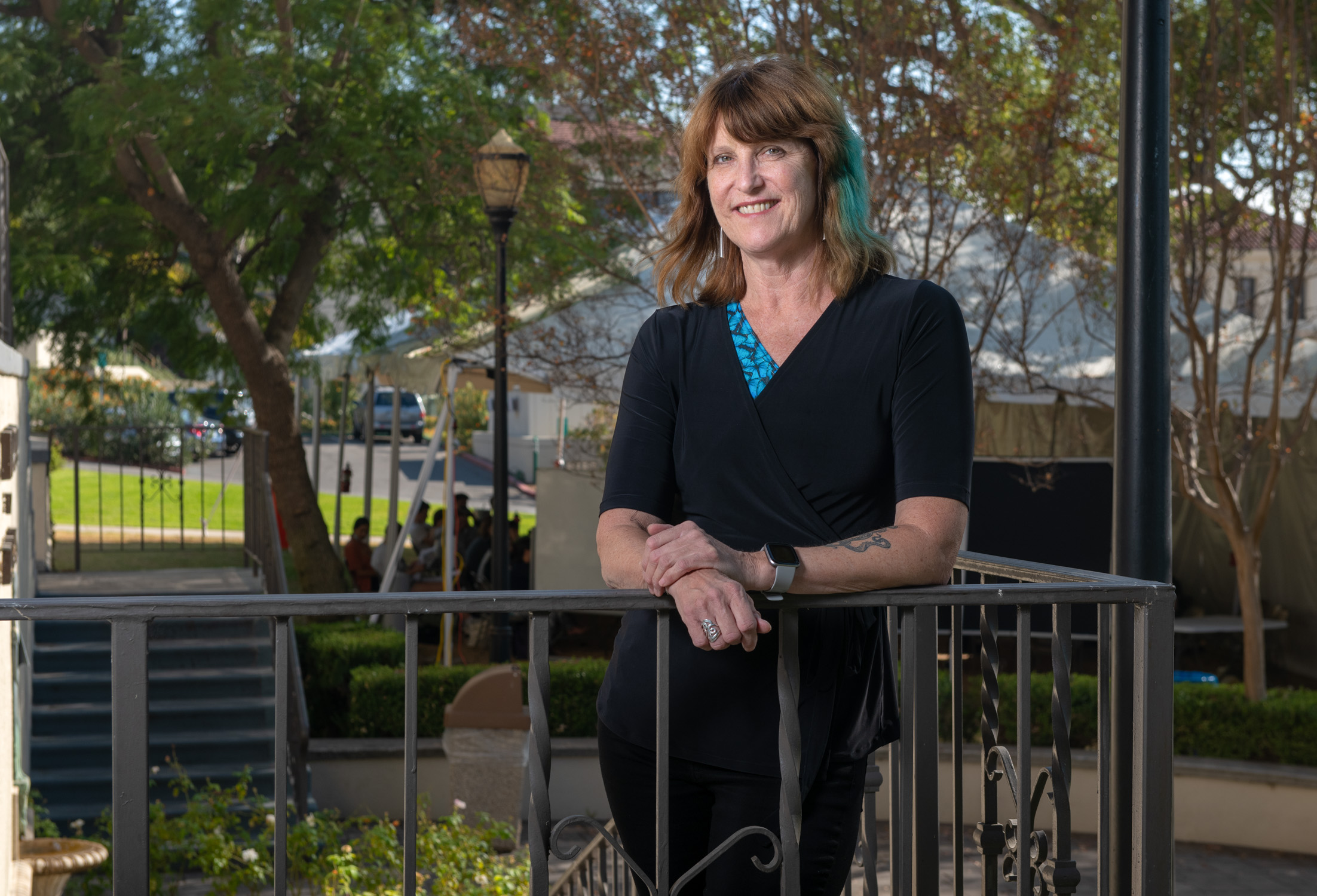
- Occupations: Professor of Art & Art History, Occidental College

Academic background
- Education: Pomona College Boston University University of California, Berkeley
- Website: https://www.oxy.edu/academics/faculty/amy-lyford

Amy Lyford (born 1963) is an American professor of art history. She is on the faculty of Occidental College in Los Angeles, California. A specialist in Modern Art, Lyford is the author of two books: Surrealist Masculinities: Gender Anxiety and the Aesthetics of Post-World War I Reconstruction in France (University of California Press, 2007) and Isamu Noguchi’s Modernism: Negotiating Race, Labor, and Nation, 1930-1950 (UC Press, 2013).

== Background ==
She earned her Ph.D. in the History of Art from University of California, Berkeley, Master's degree from Boston University, and Bachelor of Arts from Pomona College. In 1993–1994, Lyford was a Fulbright Scholar in France. She was hired at Occidental College in 1999 and now holds the title of Arthur G. Coons Professor in the History of Ideas, and is on the faculty of the Art and Art History Department. She served as associate dean of the college 2014–2016.

== Career and awards ==
Lyford's work includes essays on contemporary photographers Gilles Peress and John Divola; and she is completing a book manuscript about the American surrealist artist Dorothea Tanning (1910–2012). Her work has also looked closely at Isamu Noguchi. She was an interviewee for a video documentary segment on Noguchi for “Masters of Modern Design: the Japanese American Experience” (2019) produced by the Japanese American National Museum and KCET Artbound (2018/19).

In the summer of 2001 and the full academic year of 2005–2006, Lyford was awarded fellowships to support her research from the National Endowment for the Humanities. At Occidental, Lyford was awarded the prestigious Graham L. Sterling Memorial Award, established in 1972 to recognize a faculty member with a distinguished record of teaching, service and professional achievement. At the time, she was the only faculty member to receive the honor as an associate professor.

Lyford won the Charles C. Eldredge Prize in 2015 from the Smithsonian American Art Museum. Lyford has been awarded an International Research Travel Grant through the Terra Foundation for American Art. The grant funded research in Europe on Surrealist artist Dorothea Tanning, and the intersection of Tanning's paintings and sculptures with her less widely known and studied prints, drawings, costume designs, fashion advertisements and artists's books.

In 2016, Lyford led efforts to procure an $800,000 grant to fund the college's new Arts and Urban Experience Initiative and to found the college's Oxy Arts program.

In 2019, Lyford was presented with the Janosik-Sterling Award. Created in 1993 to honor the memory of Politics Professor Robert Janosik, the award honors the faculty member who has made an extraordinary contribution to the college community.

In addition to her scholarly work, Lyford is a public scholar who has led guided tours sponsored by the Japanese American National Museum and has been quoted in The New Yorker.

== Selected works ==
- "Acts of Memory: Gilles Peress’s Telex: Iran, Then and Now," Journal of Visual Culture 2016 Acts of Memory: Gilles Peress’s Telex: Iran, Then and Now
- “Advertising Surrealist Masculinities: André Kertész in Paris,” in Surrealism, Politics, Culture, Ray Spiteri and Donald LaCoss, eds. (Ashgate Press, 2003), 73–90.
- “The Aesthetics of Dismemberment: Surrealism and the Musée du Val-de-Grâce in 1917,” Cultural Critique 46 (Fall 2000): 45–79.
- Isamu Noguchi’s Modernism: Negotiating Race, Labor, and Nation: 1930-1950. Berkeley: University of California Press, 2013. (Paperback 2018)
- “Le numéro Barbette: Photography and the Politics of Embodiment in interwar Paris,” in The Modern Woman Revisited, Whitney Chadwick and Tirza True Latimer, eds. (Rutgers University Press, 2003), 223–235.
- “Lee Miller’s Photographic Impersonations, 1930-1945,” History of Photography 18 (Autumn 1994): 230–241.
- “Noguchi, Sculptural Abstraction, and the Politics of Japanese American Internment,” The Art Bulletin LXXXV (March 2003):137-151.
- “Photojournalism, Mass Media and the Politics of Spectacle,” with Carol Payne, Visual Resources XXI, n.2 (June 2005): 119–129.
- “Picasso, Surrealism, Hysteria,” in Änne Söll and Gerald Schroeder, eds. Der Mann in der Krise?: Visualisierungen von Männlichkeit im 20. und 21. Jahrhundert (Cologne, Weimar, Vienna: Böhlau-Verlag, 2015), 76–96.
- “Refashioning Surrealism: The Early Art of Dorothea Tanning,” in Dorothea Tanning: Beyond the Esplanade, Exhibition Catalogue, Frey/Norris Gallery, San Francisco, CA. 2010.
- Surrealist Masculinities: Gender Anxiety and the Aesthetics of Post-World War I Reconstruction. Berkeley: University of California Press, 2007.
- “Teaching Feminist Art: a survey,” Documents (Winter 2000).
