= Edward P. Costigan =

American politician (1874–1939)

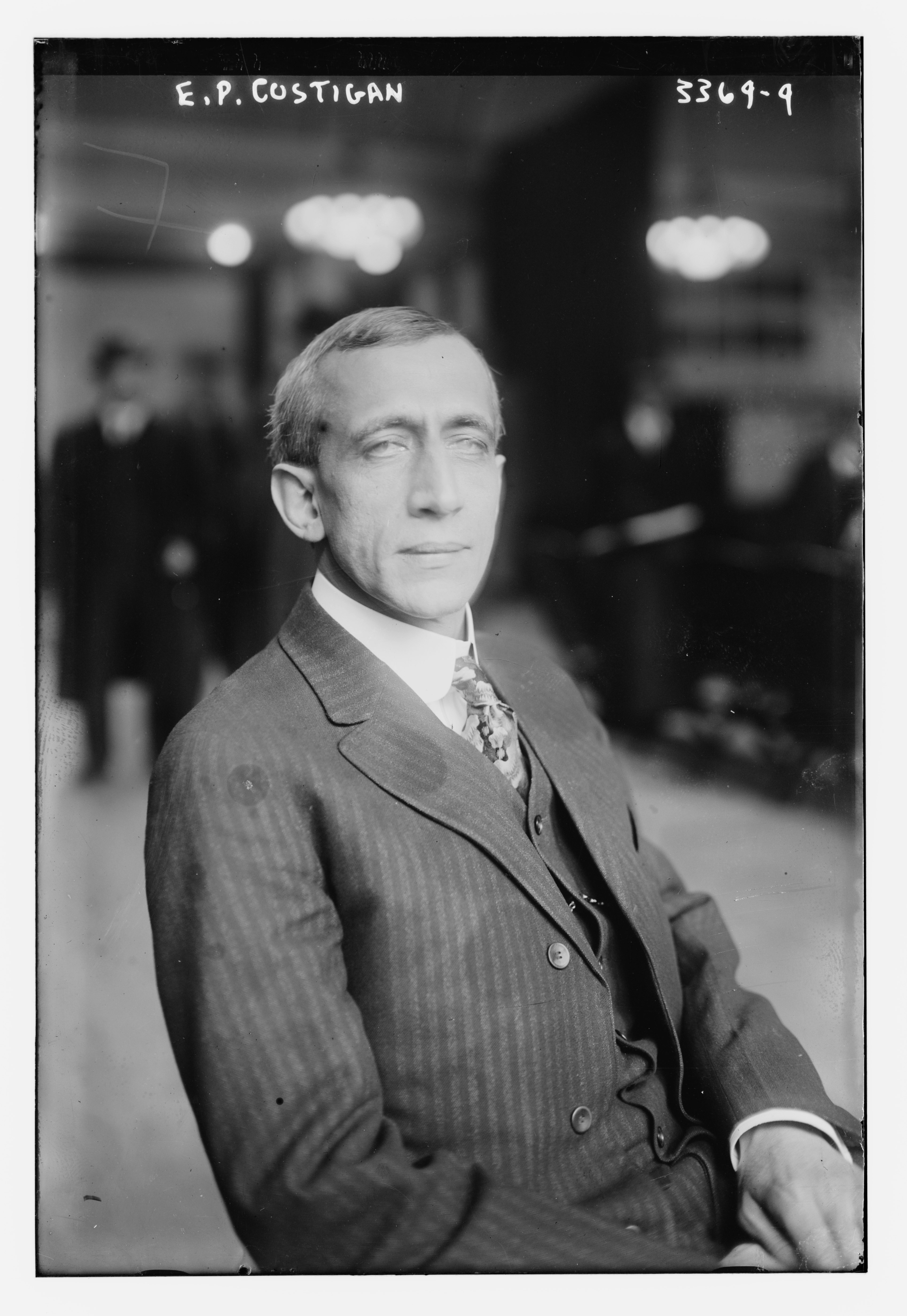
- Costigan in 1915

United States Senator from Colorado
- In office March 4, 1931 – January 3, 1937
- Preceded by: Lawrence C. Phipps
- Succeeded by: Edwin C. Johnson

Personal details
- Born: Edward Prentiss Costigan; July 1, 1874 King William County, Virginia, U.S.
- Died: January 17, 1939 (aged 64) Denver, Colorado, U.S.
- Resting place: Fairmount Cemetery, Denver, Colorado
- Party: Democratic (after 1914)
- Other political affiliations: Republican (before 1912); Progressive "Bull Moose" (1912-1914)
- Spouse: Mabel Cory (m. 1903)
- Education: Harvard University
- Occupation: Lawyer, politician, activist
- Profession: Law

Edward Prentiss Costigan (July 1, 1874 – January 17, 1939) was a Democratic Party politician who represented Colorado in the United States Senate from 1931 to 1937. He was a founding member of the Progressive Party in Colorado in 1912.

== Early life and education ==
Edward Prentiss Costigan was born near Beulahville in King William County, Virginia, on July 1, 1874. His parents were George and Emilie (Sigur) Costigan. In 1877, his parents moved to Lake City, Colorado, and the following year settled in Ouray. After five years in Ouray, his father was appointed judge of the newly-formed San Miguel County, Colorado, by Governor James Benton Grant. He was elected the judge of Telluride two times. Both of his parents had an interest in mining and were owners of the Belmont mine and in mining in Mono County, California. The family resided in Denver, where his mother was a prominent member of the Denver Women's Club.

Costigan attended Denver public schools, including East Denver High School. He studied law and was admitted to the bar in Salt Lake City in 1897. He graduated from Harvard University in 1899. His brother, George Purcell Costigan Jr. was a lawyer, professor, dean, and author.

== Career ==
The following year, he moved to Denver, Colorado, and practiced law. In 1902, he was declared the winner in the election as state representative, but a contest prevented his assuming his seat at the House of Representatives during the session. He began a fight for honest elections, which lasted over a decade. In 1906, he became a lawyer for the Honest Election League as well as the Law Enforcement League, the latter position he held for two years. He fought for a local option law as legal advisor, which was sustained in the Colorado Supreme Court. Costigan was chairman of the Dry Denver Committee in 1910 and was the president of the Civil Service Reform Association of Denver.

During this period, he ran his law practice. He litigated freight rate cases before the Interstate Commerce Commission, representing Arizona commercial organizations and the Denver Chamber of Commerce. He was an attorney for the United Mine Workers of America in 1914 during a congressional investigation into the Colorado coal strike. There were several murder cases that occurred during the strike and Costigan secured acquittals for a number of defendants.

Initially a Republican, in 1912 he was a founding member of the Progressive Party in Colorado. He then unsuccessfully ran for governor in 1912 and 1914. President Woodrow Wilson appointed Costigan as a member of the United States Tariff Commission in 1917, a position he held until March 1928, when he began practicing law again. He was elected to the U.S. Senate as a Democrat in 1930. Oscar L. Chapman managed his campaign. He served from March 4, 1931, to January 3, 1937. He did not run for reelection in 1936.

=== Jones–Costigan amendment to the Sugar Act ===
In 1934 he co-sponsored the Jones–Costigan amendment to the Agricultural Adjustment Act, protecting the U.S. sugar industry, including sugar from Colorado beets. It was a cause of deep interest to Costigan and his wife, Mabel. It reformed the sugar industry, prohibited the hiring of workers under 14, and set a maximum eight-hour work day for those 14 to 16.

Mabel, a member of the National Child Labor Committee advisory council, was particularly concerned about the practice of employing children to work in sugar beet fields.

=== Costigan–Wagner Bill ===
Costigan and New York Democratic Senator Robert F. Wagner sponsored a federal anti-lynching law in 1934. In 1935, Senate leaders tried to persuade President Franklin D. Roosevelt to support the Costigan–Wagner Bill. Roosevelt was concerned about a provision of the bill that called for the punishment of sheriffs who failed to protect their prisoners from lynch mobs. He believed that he would lose the support of the white voters in the South by approving it and lose the 1936 presidential election.

The Costigan–Wagner Bill received support from many members of Congress but the emerging Southern Caucus managed to defeat it in the Senate. The national debate that took place over the issue again brought renewed attention to the crime of lynching. By the mid-1930s, the rate of the crime had finally dropped to mostly below 20 annually. Several organizations held 1935 New York anti-lynching exhibitions in support of the bill. The Anti-Lynching Bill of 1937, also known as the Gavagan-Wagner Act, was proposed in response to Costigan–Wagner's failure, but was similarly blocked by the Senate after passing the House.

== Personal life ==
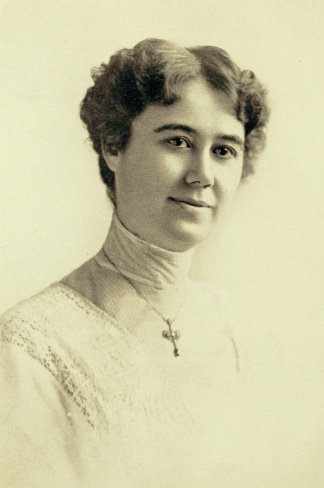
Mabel Cory Costigan, Representative Women of Colorado, 1914

Costigan married high school classmate Mabel Cory on June 12, 1903. He was class president and she was class secretary. She was involved in church, educational, and community affairs. She was an expert on Sunday school primary work and was a lecturer and story-teller. Mabel was the president of the Woman's Club of Denver and chairwoman of the industrial committee of the Colorado State Federation of Women's Clubs. She campaigned for child labor law, particularly interested in prohibiting the practice of using children in sugar beet fields. Mabel was a member of the National Child Labor Committee advisory council. She was also interested in the plight of foreign-born individuals in labor practices.

After leaving Congress, he retired from professional and political life. He died on January 17, 1939, and was buried at Fairmount Cemetery in Denver.

Party political offices
First	Progressive nominee for Governor of Colorado; 1912, 1914	Succeeded by None
Preceded by Alva B. Adams	Democratic nominee for U.S. Senator from Colorado (Class 2); 1930	Succeeded by Edwin C. Johnson
U.S. Senate
Preceded by Lawrence C. Phipps	U.S. senator (Class 2) from Colorado; 1931–1937; Served alongside: Walter Walker, Karl C. Schuyler, Alva B. Adams	Succeeded by Edwin C. Johnson
