= Dora Apel =

American author and academic

Dora Apel (born January 22, 1952) is an American art historian, cultural critic, author, and W. Hawkins Ferry Endowed Chair Professor Emerita of Modern and Contemporary Art at Wayne State University in Detroit, where she taught from 1994 to 2019. Her work focuses on issues of trauma, memory, race, gender, national identity, war, and the negative impacts of capitalism. Her book, Calling Memory into Place, includes essays that delineate her family's history during and after the Holocaust. Two of her books address the history of lynching black people in the United States.

== Early life and education ==
Apel was born on January 22, 1952, in Philadelphia, Pennsylvania. Her parents are Samuel and Ethel (Ajzenkrantz) Apel. In 1974, Apel received double degrees from the State University of New York Binghamton: B.A. Anthropology and B.A. Studio Art. She followed with a M.A. in History of Art, from Wayne State University, in 1989. She received her Ph.D. in Art History and Ph.D. Certificate in Cultural Studies from the University of Pittsburgh in 1995.

== Academic career ==
- Part-time faculty, Wayne State University, 1994–1999
- Holder of W. Hawkins Ferry Endowed Chair in Modern and Contemporary Art History, Wayne State University 1999—present (as Assistant Professor 1999–2003, Associate Professor 2005–2013, Professor 2013–2019. Professor Emerita 2019–present).

== Critical reception ==
Her books have been reviewed at length in various publications. A review published in PopMatters points out that her first book, Memory Effects: The Holocaust and the Art of Secondary Witnessing (2002), explored the work of artists who chose the Holocaust as their topic although they did not personally experience it, whereas Calling Memory into Place (2020) used her own family's Holocaust-related experiences during and after World War II, which "...strips away the academic analysis to get down to the way history hurts not in the abstract, but as embodied in the flesh." A review of Beautiful Terrible Ruins describes Apel's take on "ruin lust," and the contrast between viewing decaying stone structures of past cultures as examples of our superiority, versus seeing the acute decline of a modern city, Detroit, as an anxiety-inducing fear of our own possible future.

== Works ==
=== Books ===
- (2020) Calling Memory into Place. New Brunswick: Rutgers University Press. ISBN 197880783X
- (2015) Beautiful Terrible Ruins: Detroit and the Anxiety of Decline. New Brunswick: Rutgers University Press. ISBN 978-0-8135-7406-6
- (2012) War Culture and the Contest of Images. New Brunswick: Rutgers University Press. ISBN 978-0-8135-5394-8
- (2008) Lynching Photographs. Co-authored with Shawn Michelle Smith. Ed. Anthony Lee. Berkeley: University of California Press. ISBN 978-0520253322
- (2004) Imagery of Lynching: Black Men, White Women, and the Mob. New Brunswick: Rutgers University Press. ISBN 0-8135-3459-3
- (2002) Memory Effects: The Holocaust and the Art of Secondary Witnessing. New Brunswick: Rutgers University Press. ISBN 0-8135-3049-0

=== Selected articles and essays ===
- (2020) Farah Al Qasimi—Between Two Worlds: Arab Americans in Detroit
- Thirsty Cities: Who Owns the Right to Water? In The Routledge Companion to Urban Imaginaries, 25–40. Ed. Christoph Lindner and Miriam Meissner. New York: Routledge, 2018. ISBN 1138058882
- (2015) The Ruins of Capitalism
- ‘Hands Up, Don’t Shoot’: Surrendering to Liberal Illusions, Theory and Event 17:3 (2014). Special Issue on “Ferguson and the Tragic Presence of the Past”
- Violence and Historical Reenactment: From the American Civil War to the Moore’s Ford Lynching. IN: Violence and Visibility in Modern History, 241–261. Ed. Juergen Martschukat and Silvan Niedermeier. New York: Palgrave Macmillan, 2013. ISBN 978-1-137-37868-2
- The Public Display of Torture Photos. IN: Representations of Pain in Art and Visual Culture (Routledge Advances in Art and Visual Studies), 203–213. Ed. James Elkins and Maria-Pia Di Bella. New York: Routledge, 2012. ISBN 978-1138108417

== Awards and honors ==
- (2008) American Library Association: Outstanding Academic Title in Art and Architecture for Lynching Photographs
