= List of United States post office murals in Texas =

Following is a list of United States post office murals created in Texas between 1934 and 1943.

Location	Mural title	Image	Artist	Date	Notes	NRHP-listed
Alice	South Texas Panorama		Warren Hunter	1939	Relocated to the Smithsonian American Art Museum in 1968	
Alpine	View of Alpine		Jose Moya del Pino	1940	oil on masonite	
Alvin	Emigrants at Nightfall		Loren Mozley	1942	oil on canvas; Alvin Historical Museum	
J. Marvin Jones Federal Building and Mary Lou Robinson United States Courthouse, Amarillo	Cattle Loading, Cattle Branding, Oil Gang Plow, Dick Harrow		Julius Woeltz	1941	oil on canvas	
J. Marvin Jones Federal Building and Mary Lou Robinson United States Courthouse, Amarillo	Coronado's Expedition in the Palo Duro Canyon		Julius Woeltz	1941	oil on canvas	
Anson	Cowboy Dance		Jenne Magafan	1939	oil on canvas	
Arlington	Gathering Pecans		Otis Dozier	1941	oil on canvas	
Big Spring	Old Pioneers		Peter Hurd	1938	fresco	
Brady	Texas Immigrants		Gordon K. Grant	1939	oil on canvas	
Brownfield	Ranchers of the Panhandle Fighting Prairie Fire with Skinned Steer		Frank Mechau	1940	oil on canvas; relocated to the Brownfield Police Headquarters	
Caldwell	Indians Moving		Suzanne Scheuer	1939	oil on canvas, relocated to Burleson County Courthouse; a colored pencil on paperboard study is at Smithsonian Art Museum	
Canyon	Strays		Frances Ankrom	1939	oil on canvas; relocated to the new Canyon Post Office	
Center	Logging Scene		Edward Chavez	1941	oil on canvas	
Clifton	Texas Longhorns – A Vanishing Breed		Ila Turner McAfee	1941	oil on canvas	
College Station	Good Technique – Good Harvest		Victor Arnautoff	1938	oil on canvas; mural is missing	
Conroe	Early Texans		Nicholas Lyon	1938	oil on canvas; mural destroyed, a study is in the Smithsonian Museum of American Art	
Cooper	Before the Fencing of Delta County		Lloyd Goff	1939	oil on canvas	
Corpus Christi	The Sea: Port Activities and Harbor Activities		Howard Cook	1941	tempera; relocated to the Nueces County Courthouse	
Corpus Christi	The Land: Agriculture, Mineral Resources and Ranching		Howard Cook	1941	tempera	
Dallas	Eastbound Mail Stage		Peter Hurd		Commission awarded but not completed	
Dallas	Air Mail Over Texas		Peter Hurd	1940		
Dallas	Pioneer Homebuilders		Peter Hurd	1940		
Decatur	Texas Plains		Ray Strong	1939	oil on canvas	
Eastland	Buffalo Hunt		Suzanne Scheuer	1938	oil on canvas; a colored pencil on paperboard study is at Smithsonian Art Museum	
Edinburg	Harvest of the Rio Grande Valley		Ward Lockwood	1940	oil and tempera on canvas	
El Campo	Landscape		Milford Zornes	1940	oil on canvas; mural was "in storage" but now on display in lobby	
Elgin	Texas Farm		Julius Woeltz	1940		
Farmersville	Soil Conservation in Collin County		Jerry Bywaters	1941	oil on canvas	
United States Post Office, Fort Worth			Dwight Holmes and W. H. Baker	1934	six murals commissioned by the Public Works of Art Project	
Fredericksburg	Loading Cattle		Otis Dozier	1942	oil on canvas	
Gatesville	Off to Northern Markets		Joe De Yong	1939	oil on canvas	
Giddings	Cowboys Receiving the Mail		Otis Dozier	1939	oil on canvas	
Goose Creek	Texas		Barse Miller	1938	tempera	
Graham	Oil Fields of Graham		Alexandre Hogue	1939	oil on canvas; on display at the Young County Historical Museum	
Hamilton	Texas Rangers in Camp		Ward Lockwood	1942	fresco secco	
Henderson	Local Industries		Paul Ninas	1937	fresco; destroyed	
Houston	Houston Ship Canal, Loading Cotton		Jerry Bywaters	1941	two panels and two aerial views, relocated from the now-demolished Parcel Post Building to the Bob Casey United States Courthouse	
Houston	Houston Ship Canal, Loading Oil		Jerry Bywaters	1941	Relocated to the Bob Casey United States Courthouse	
Houston	Houston Ship Canal, Early History		Alexandre Hogue	1941	Relocated to the Bob Casey United States Courthouse	
Houston	Houston Ship Canal, The Diana Docking		Alexandre Hogue	1941	Relocated to the Bob Casey United States Courthouse	
Jasper	Industries in Jasper		Alexander Levin	1939	oil on canvas	
Kaufman	Driving the Steers		Margaret Dobson	1939	fresco; mural has been covered over.	
Kenedy	Grist for the Mill		Charles Campbell	1939	oil on canvas	
Kilgore	Pioneer Saga		Xavier Gonzalez	1941	oil on canvas	
	Drilling for Oil					
Kilgore	Music of the Plains			1940	oil on canvas; mural study for a planned installation that never occurred. The study is now located at the Smithsonian American Art Museum.	
Kilgore	Contemporary Youth			1941	oil on canvas	
La Grange	Horses		Tom E. Lewis	1939	oil on canvas; mural is missing	
Lamesa	The Horse Breakers		Fletcher Martin	1940	oil on canvas	
Lampasas	Afternoon on a Texas Ranch		Ethel Edwards	1939	oil on canvas; relocated to the Lampasas City Hall. Winner of the 48-State Mural Competition	
Liberty	The Story of the Big Fish		Howard Fisher	1939	oil on canvas	
Linden	The Last Crop		Victor Arnautoff	1938		
Livingston	Landscape		Theodore Van Soelen	1941	oil on canvas	
Livingston	Buffalo Hunting		Theodore Van Soelen	1941	oil on canvas	
Lockhart	Pony Express Station		John Law Walker	1939	oil on canvas	
Longview	Rural East Texas		Thomas Stell	1942	oil on canvas	
Mart	McLennan Looking for a Home		Jose Aceves	1939	oil on canvas	
Mineola	New and Old Methods of Transportation		Bernard Zakheim	1938	oil on canvas; destroyed	
Mission	Scene Along the Rio grande		Xavier Gonzalez	1942		
Odessa	Stampede		Tom Lea	1940	oil on canvas; relocated to new post office	
Quanah	The Naming of Quanah		Jerry Bywaters	1939	oil on canvas	
Ranger	The Crossroads Town		Emil Bisttram	1939	oil on canvas	
Robstown	Founding and Subsequent Development of Robstown, Texas		Alice Reynolds	1941		
Rockdale	Industry in Rockdale		Maxwell B. Starr	1940	oil on canvas	
Rosenberg	LaSalle's Last Expedition		William Dean Fausett	1941	mural was destroyed	
Rusk	Agriculture and Industry at Risk		Bernard Zakheim	1939	tempera	
San Antonio	San Antonio's Importance in Texas History		Howard Cook	1939	fresco; sixteen panels	
Seymour	Comanches		Tom Lea	1942	oil on canvas	
Smithville	The Law, Texas Rangers		Minette Teichmueller	1939	oil on canvas	
Teague	Cattle Roundup		Thomas Stell	1940	oil on canvas	
Trinity	Lumber Manufacturing		Jerry Bywaters	1942	oil on canvas	
Wellington	Settlers in Collingsworth County		Bernard Arnest	1940	tempera	
