= List of United States post office murals in Nebraska =

Following is a list of United States post office murals created in Nebraska between 1934 and 1943.

Location	Mural title	Image	Artist	Date	Notes	NRHP listed
Albion	Winter in Nebraska		Jenne Magafan	1939	oil on canvas	
Auburn	Threshing		Ethel Magafan	1938	oil on canvas	
Crawford	The Crossing		G. Glenn Newell	1940	oil on canvas	
Geneva	Building a Sod House		Edward Chavez	1941	oil on canvas	
Hebron	Stampeding Buffaloes Stopping the Train		Eldora Lorenzini	1939	oil on canvas	
Minden	Military Post on the Overland Trail		William E. L. Bunn	1939	oil on canvas	
Ogallala	Long Horns		Frank Mechau	1938	oil on canvas	
O'Neil	Bailing Hay in Holt County in the Early Days		Eugene Trentham	1938	oil on canvas	
Pawnee City	The Auction		Kenneth Evett	1942	oil on canvas	
Red Cloud	Loading Cattle		Archie Musick	1941	oil on canvas	
Red Cloud	Stockade Builders		Archie Musick	1941	oil on canvas	
Red Cloud	Moving Westward		Archie Musick	1941	oil on canvas	
Schuyler	Wild Horses by Moonlight		Philip von Saltza	1940	oil on canvas	
Valentine	End of the Line		Kady Faulkner	1939	oil on plaster	
