= List of United States post office murals in Colorado =

Following is a list of United States post office murals created in Colorado between 1934 and 1943. A review of murals in Colorado's post offices found there were no frescos, but rather all had been painted on canvas.

Location	Mural title	Image	Artist	Date	Notes	NRHP listed
Colorado Springs					Two murals in the Colorado Springs post officewere removed and installed in the Federal Building in Denver. This is probably the building now named Byron White United States Courthouse.	
Denver	The Horse Corral		Ethel Magafan	1942		
Englewood	Colorado Stock Sale		Boardman Robinson	1940		2011
Florence Post Office Florence	Antelope		Olive Rush	1939	tempera; mural featured on 2019 Post Office Murals stamp set	1986
Glenwood Springs, Colorado	Decorative Map		Jenne Magafan and Edward Chavez	1937		
Golden	Building the New Road		Kenneth Evett	1941	tempera on fiberboard	
Grand Junction	The Harvest		Louise Emerson Ronnebeck	1940	crescent shaped canvas	
Gunnison	The Wealth of the West		Ila Turner McAfee	1940		
Littleton	North Platte Country against the Mountains		John Hathaway Fraser	1940	Winner of the 48-State Mural Competition, on display at Littleton City Hall	
Loveland	Industries around Loveland		James Russell Sherman	1938		
U.S. Post Office-Manitou Springs Main, in Manitou Springs	Hunters, Red and White		Archie Musick	1942		1986
Montrose						
U.S. Post Office, in Rifle	Colorado Landscape		George Vander Sluis	1942	oil on canvas	1986
Rocky Ford	The First Crossing at Rocky Ford		Victor Higgins	1936	oil on canvas	2008
Walsenburg	The Spanish Peaks				oil on canvas	
