= Chris Karras =

American painter (1924 - 2014)

Chris Karras (June 5, 1924 - January 4, 2014) was an American painter.

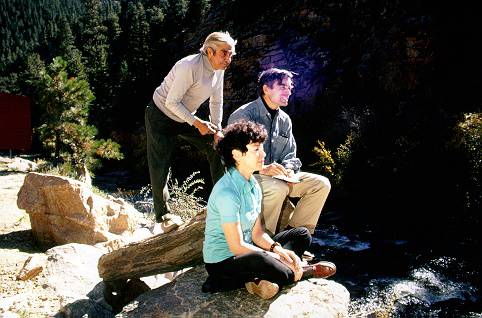
Karras seated at center right back, with Xavier Gonzalez and Ethel Edwards.

Karras was born in Chicago in 1924. He studied at the Art Institute of Chicago and he received his bachelor's and master's degrees from the University of Illinois at Urbana Champaign. He taught at the University of Colorado at Boulder, the Heights School in Washington and privately. He was the Exhibit Specialist at the National Collection of Fine Arts for five years, and then he worked as Visual Information Specialist at the National Gallery of Art. In the latter position, he was responsible for the gallery modifications, including the display installations. He designed installations for the American Institute of Architects, the Smithsonian Natural History building, the National Collection of Fine Arts and the Gallery of Modern Art.

He died January 4, 2014, at the age of 89.
