= United States Post Office Madill =

- U.S. National Register of Historic Places
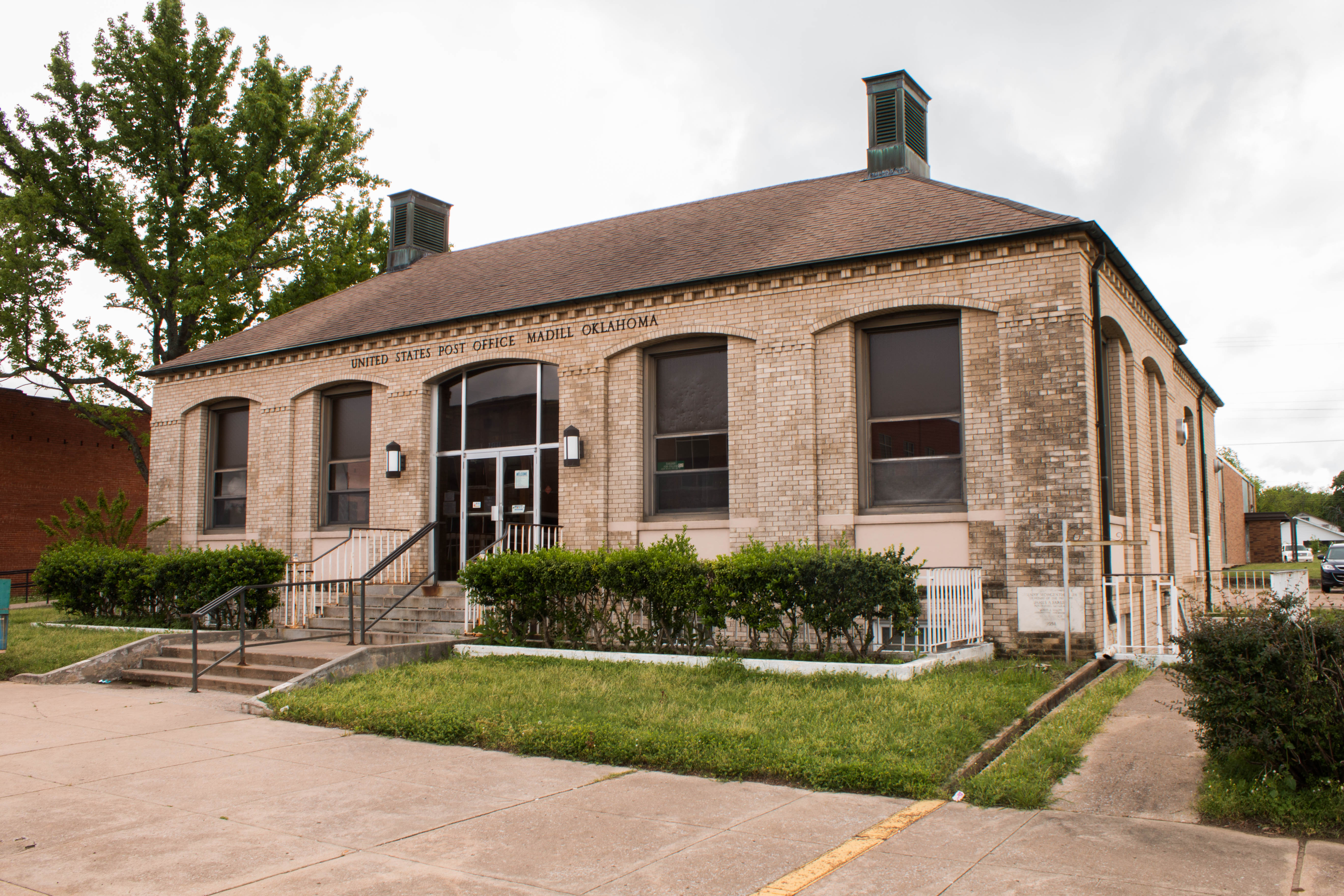

- Location within Oklahoma
- Location: 223 W. Lille Blvd., Madill, Oklahoma
- Coordinates: 34°05′26″N 96°46′22″W
- Area: less than one acre
- Built: 1938
- Architect: Louis A. Simon; Magafan, Ethel
- Architectural style: Colonial Revival
- MPS: Oklahoma Post Offices with Section Art MPS
- NRHP reference No.: 09000216
- Added to NRHP: April 17, 2009

The United States Post Office Madill, in Madill, Oklahoma, was built in 1938. It was listed on the National Register of Historic Places in 2009.

It includes "Prairie Fire", a New Deal program mural by artist Ethel Magafan. "Filling the wall space above the postmaster's door and appearing as though supported by the crown molding, is the mural, Prairie Fire, painted by Ethel Magafan and installed in 1940. The mural is painted in tempera on canvas. Its earthy hues match the wood used on the vestibule, postmaster's door, and counter area. The mural shows a woman grasping a child in a Conestoga wagon about to be engulfed in flames. The wagon is pulled by four yoked oxen agitated by the conflagration. Two men carrying shovels rush to dig a break to stop the fire from spreading. Magafan's scene vividly depicts the action and chaos associated with traveling across and settling the prairies."

== See also ==
- List of United States post office murals
