= Hebron United States Post Office =

Historic post office building in Nebraska, United States

- US Post Office--Hebron
- U.S. National Register of Historic Places
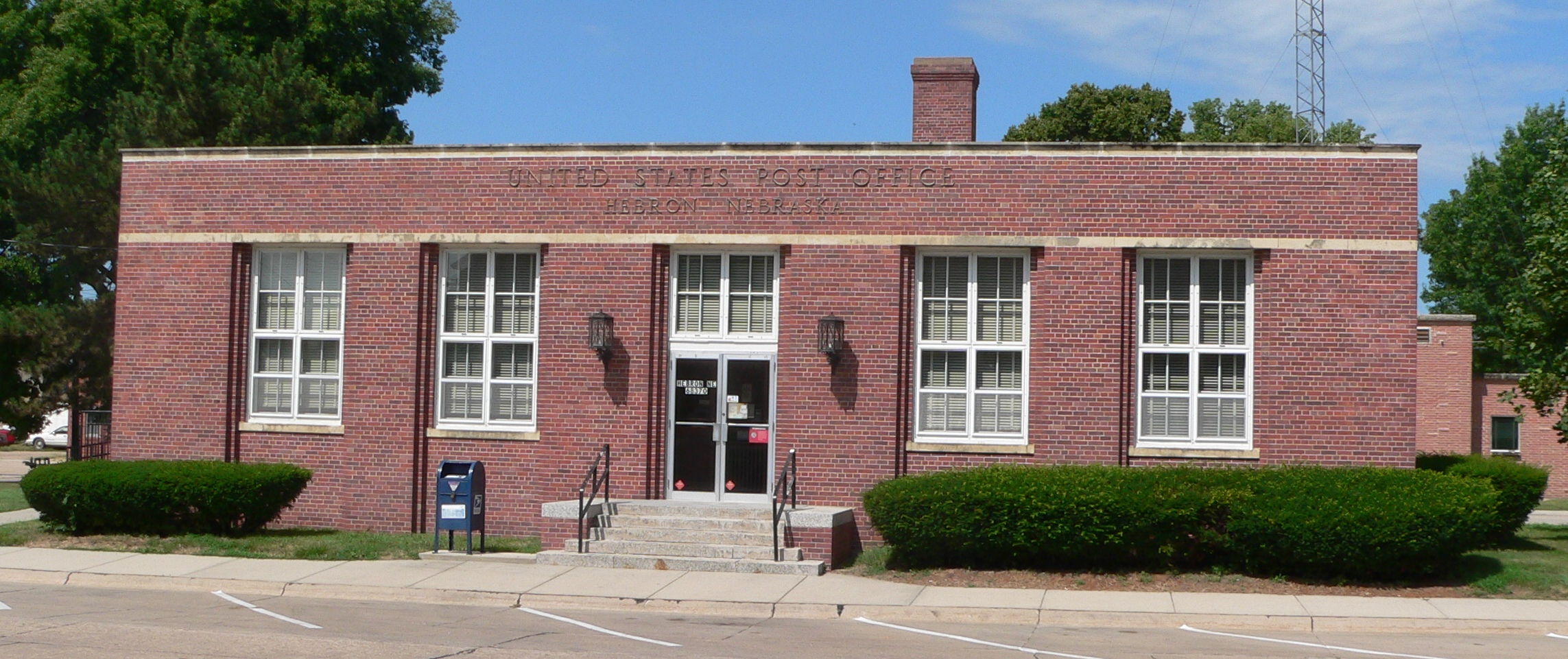
- The building in 2010

- Location within Nebraska Location within the United States
- Location: 145 North 5th Street, Hebron, Nebraska
- Coordinates: 40°10′03″N 97°35′20″W
- Area: less than one acre
- Built: 1937
- Architect: Louis A. Simon
- Architectural style: Moderne
- MPS: Nebraska Post Offices Which Contain Section Artwork MPS
- NRHP reference No.: 92000473
- Added to NRHP: May 11, 1992

The Hebron United States Post Office is a historic building in Hebron, Nebraska. It was built in 1937, and designed in the Moderne style by U.S. supervising architect Louis A. Simon. Inside there is a mural by Eldora Lorenzini, completed in 1939. The building has been listed on the National Register of Historic Places since May 11, 1992, as US Post Office-Hebron.

The mural's subject is a herd of stampeding buffalo, stopping a train. An event of this type was asserted to have happened in the area.
