= J. Marvin Jones Federal Building and Mary Lou Robinson United States Courthouse =

- Amarillo US Post Office and Courthouse
- U.S. National Register of Historic Places
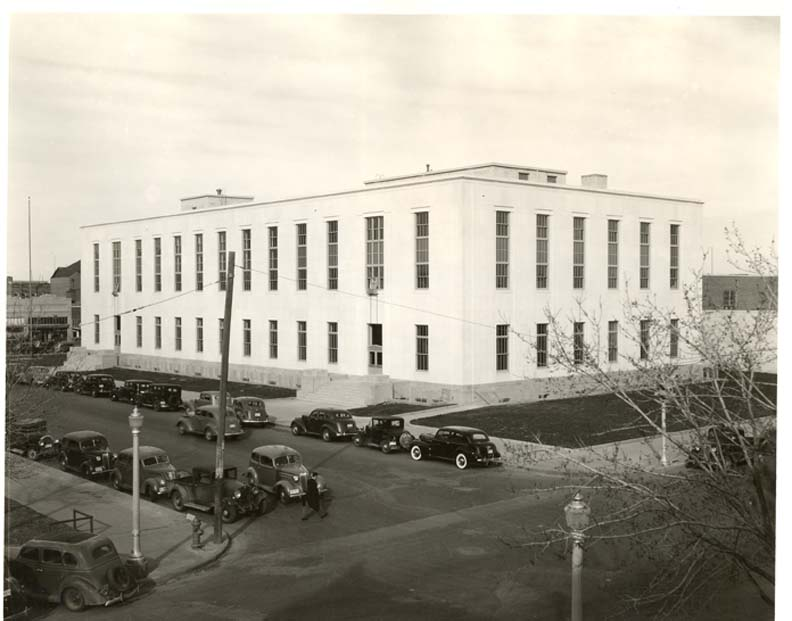
- Photo from 1938

- Location within Texas Location within the United States
- Location: 205 E. Fifth St., Amarillo, Texas
- Coordinates: 35°12′31″N 101°50′3″W
- Area: 1 acre (0.40 ha)
- Built: 1939
- Architect: Wyatt C. Hedrick, et.al.
- Architectural style: Art Deco, Moderne
- NRHP reference No.: 00001175
- Added to NRHP: September 29, 2000

The J. Marvin Jones Federal Building and Mary Lou Robinson United States Courthouse, formerly known as the Amarillo U.S. Post Office and Courthouse, is a courthouse of the United States District Court for the Northern District of Texas built in Amarillo, Texas in 1937. It reflects Art Deco architecture and Moderne architecture, and was listed on the National Register of Historic Places in 2000. In addition to its continuous use as a courthouse, it has served as a post office, as a customhouse, and as a government office building.

It was renamed for U.S. Court of Claims judge John Marvin Jones in 1980, and was renamed the J. Marvin Jones Federal Building and Mary Lou Robinson United States Courthouse in 2018 in honor of federal judge Mary Lou Robinson.

== Significance ==
Built in 1937 and 1938, the building occupies a prominent position in downtown Amarillo, across East Fifth Avenue north of Courthouse Square. Smaller and less important architecturally than the adjacent Potter County Courthouse, the Jones Building nevertheless gives the Federal Government a tangible presence in the center this city on the plains of North Texas, and demonstrates the concern that existed at the time of its construction for enhancing public places. Built to occupy approximately half of the block bounded by East Fifth Avenue, S. Taylor Street, East Fourth Avenue and S. Fillmore Street, the structure was designed as the United States Post Office and Courthouse. It served both of these functions, and provided additional Federal offices, until 1977 when the Post Office moved its central office out of the building and into its fourth Amarillo location.

This building was designed by well-known Texas architect Wyatt C. Hedrick (who had offices in Fort Worth, Dallas, and Houston). Louis A. Simon of the U.S. Treasury Department was the supervising architect and Neal Melnick was the supervising engineer; Algernon Blair of Montgomery, Alabama was the contractor. Julius Woeltz of New Orleans won an important competition to paint the murals on the walls of the Main Lobby. Although not a particularly distinguished design effort by the Hedrick firm, the completed building was nonetheless well-planned and demonstrated of a thorough familiarity of the Federal Government's standard details of the day for post offices and courthouses. Further, the Jones Building can be understood as an example of what is characterized as the American Renaissance Movement, a relatively short-lived period in art and architecture. This strongly nationalistic movement began by identifying with the public art and construction programs of Renaissance Italy, and then adapted European art and architectural styles and symbolism to celebrate American themes. It ceased without finding a distinctive path.

After about fifteen years of occupancy, in the mid-1950s the Government extended the mail platform on the north and back side of the building to the west. Other alterations were also effected in the ensuing years, including the provision of paving in place of green space on the east and west sides of the building. In the 1970s, insensitively conceived and executed alterations for air conditioning and renovations to replace the Post Office damaged and obscured large portions of the interior. With plans for two additional courtrooms the historic significance of the Jones Building is limited to its largely intact exterior, a small Main Lobby, the District Courtroom and certain service areas and elements.

== Architectural description ==
The J. Marvin Jones Federal Building is a three-story concrete structure with a full basement, notable for the straightforwardness and simplicity of its planning and expression. Rectangular in plan, regular and symmetrical in elevation, it combines an organization derived from Classical or Renaissance Revival architecture with details drawn from the Modernistic style of its date of creation. The thirteen bay principal elevation faces Courthouse Square with regularly spaced windows cut into the plane of the light buff limestone clad wall. With a limestone spandrel at the level of the second floor itself, these set-back windows give a rhythm to the primary wall surface that allows it to read like pilasters marching along the facades. Two entries, symmetrically placed in the slightly wider second and twelfth bays, are identified with fluted pilasters that flank the doors and extend vertically approximately forty feet to the head of the third floor windows. On the south-facing elevation as well as the east and west facades the second and third floor windows are combined into a single unit with a glass spandrel window over the intermediate floor structure. Pilasters with simplified capitals rise alongside each jamb from the second story window sills to the heads of the third floor windows. This expression produces the appearance of a two-story building with a principal, upper floor of grander purpose, that of the double-height District Courtroom.

The depth and substance of the mottled pink and black Texas granite base and basement wall cladding are obscured by gratings installed in recent years at grade, that block off the recessed areas or light wells around the building. The safety concerns that led to the introduction of these gratings can be relatively simply addressed with minor modifications of the handsome wrought iron railings that surround the building. Security bars can be reintroduced at the basement windows if required. Granite cheek blocks and planters either side of the two sets of steps to the East Fifth Avenue entry doors are carved with reeds and flutes characteristic of the Moderne style of architecture. A wheelchair ramp added in 1992 at the entry to the Main Lobby employs the same Texas granite as the original construction, with less skill in detailing and arrangement.

The rear or North side of the building is distinguished from the other sides by its form, its wall material and the former mail platform, extended to the west in 1956. The rectangular footprint of the basement and the first floor is developed into a U-shaped plan with a light court at the rear on the second and third floors. A matte, light cream colored face brick clearly distinguishes this as a secondary or service side. The original purpose of the building, the clarity of its conception, the period of the construction and the skill of the architect are all evident here.

Still intact on all facades are the original steel window frames and sashes, of standard manufacture and characteristic of the period of construction. There are however multiple broken lights or glasses in the first floor transom windows. This is the result of back-painting the glass black and installing insulated plywood backup panels, which occurred in the 1976 renovation as a byproduct of lowering ceilings for air conditioning ductwork. This unfortunate renovation also closed the north-facing skylight monitor over the first floor area that once housed the postal work area. The original aluminum and glass entrance doors have also been removed, with their pulls and hardware designed to reinforce the motif stated by the wrought iron railing around the building, and replaced with generic aluminum framed doors. The single light glass transom above these doors has been replaced with an opaque board that serves as a backdrop for the building name. The aluminum eagles survive, perched on their lighting fixture supports at the second floor window sills above each entry, although the custom fixtures are no longer functioning.

Over time the building has been surrounded by asphalt parking areas on all sides except the south side, which faces Courthouse Square. As conceived and planted, the building was set with green space on three sides to reinforce the limestone clad principal elevations, with service and vehicular access only on the north side. At present the paving for parking and drives is loosely organized and deteriorated. Although vehicular parking is always valuable, a restoration of the original relationship of the building to the landscape is recommended. Service functions in the paved areas at the rear of the building also need to be analyzed, to avoid potentially dangerous conditions like that presented by the close proximity of the dumpster to the gas meter.

On the interior of the Jones Building, there are few spaces still relatively intact. The Main Lobby and the District Courtroom are most notable in this regard; both have elements that are unaltered or largely restorable. The volumes, materials and detailing of these rooms can with minor alterations be brought back to their historic conditions, which demonstrate well the original architectural intentions that generated the building. A large percentage of the elements and details that determine the character of the building are intact in secondary, service areas like stairs and toilet rooms. The corridors and office areas themselves have been diminished in volume and have lost significant portions of their original elements and finishes. On the first floor, key elements like the patterned multi-colored terrazzo floor, the decorative plaster ceiling of the Post Office Lobby and the framework for the skylight monitor above the Postal Work Area are largely intact and recoverable. These assets can be reclaimed if current finishes covering them are removed and the spaces involved are replanned to take advantage of their existence.

== Gallery ==
Murals by Julius Woeltz at the J. Marvin Jones Federal Building:

Cattle Loading

Oil

Harrow

Coronado's Exploration Party

== See also ==
- National Register of Historic Places listings in Potter County, Texas
- List of United States federal courthouses in Texas
