= Eldora Lorenzini =

American painter

- Born: 1910; Weldona, Colorado
- Died: 1993 (aged 82–83); Alliance, Nebraska
- Known for: painting

Eldora Lorenzini (1910–1993) was an American painter, known for her New Deal mural in the Hebron, Nebraska Post Office. She also worked for the Index of American Design.

== Biography ==
Lorenzini was born in 1910 in Weldona, Colorado. She attended the Colorado Springs Fine Arts Center. Lorenzini was made aware of the Treasury Relief Art Project (TRAP) by one of her teachers, George Biddle. She subsequently submitted her entry for a mural and was selected for the US Post Office-Hebron. Her oil on canvas mural entitled Stampeding Buffaloes Stopping Train was completed in 1939. She was paid $670.00 for her work.

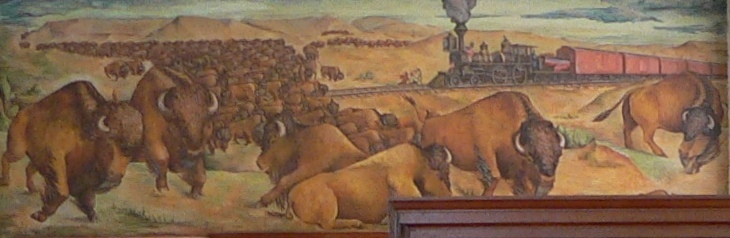
Stampeding Buffaloes Stopping Train

Lorenzini never married. She worked as an art teacher, illustrator, muralist and portrait painter. She died in Alliance, Nebraska in 1993.

Her work for the Index of American Design is in the collection of the National Gallery of Art in Washington, D.C.
