= Geneva United States Post Office =

- U.S. Post Office-Geneva
- U.S. National Register of Historic Places
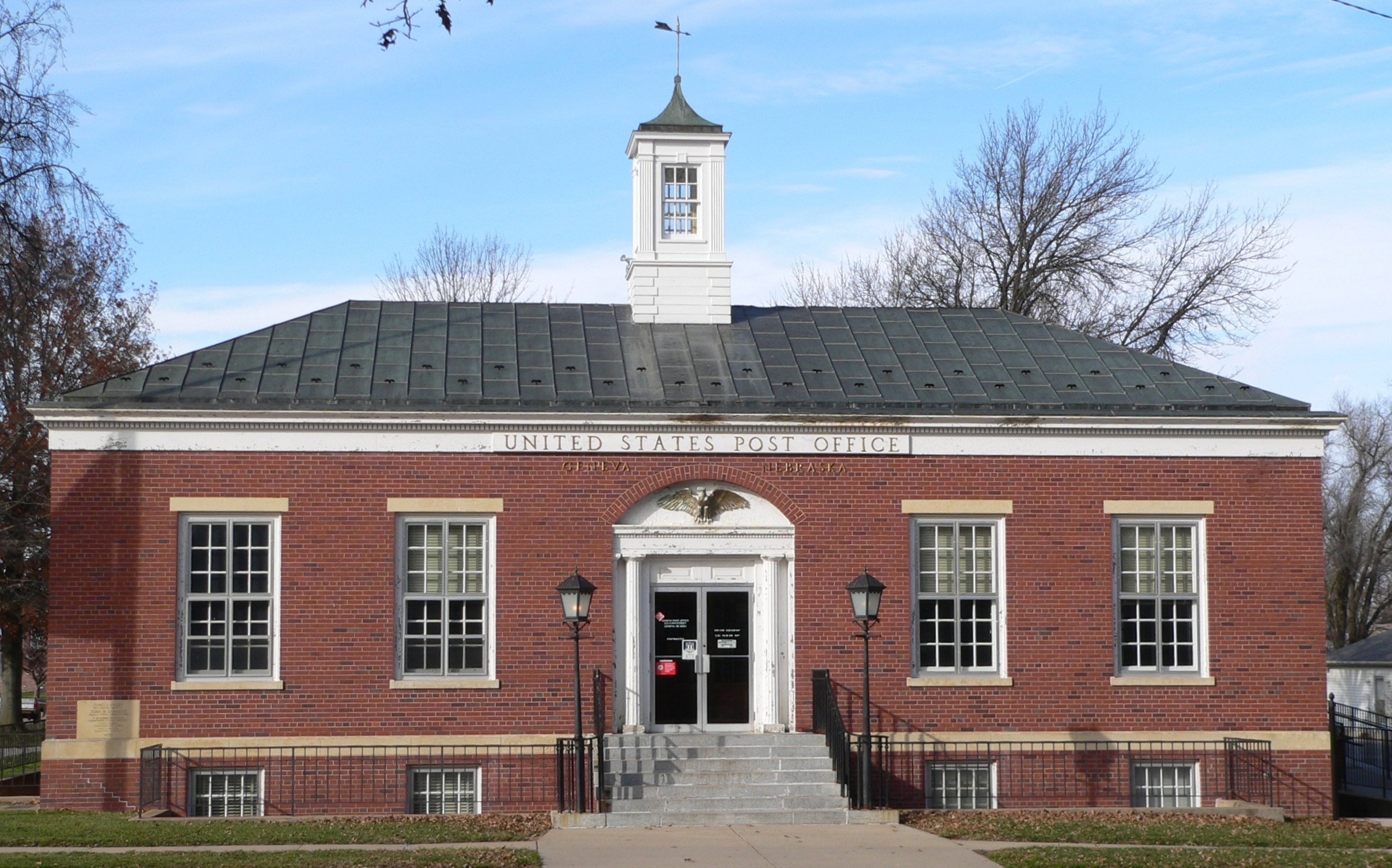
- The building in 2009

- Location within Nebraska Location within the United States
- Location: 202 North 9th Street, Geneva, Nebraska
- Coordinates: 40°31′38″N 97°36′10″W
- Area: less than one acre
- Built: 1941
- Architect: Louis A. Simon
- Architectural style: Georgian Revival
- MPS: Nebraska Post Offices Which Contain Section Artwork MPS
- NRHP reference No.: 92000478
- Added to NRHP: May 11, 1992

The Geneva United States Post Office is a historic building in Geneva, Nebraska. It was built in 1939–1940, and designed in the Georgian Revival style by architect Louis A. Simon. Inside, there is a mural by Edward Chávez, completed in 1941. The mural was cleaned and restored in 1981 and was then in excellent condition.

The building was listed on the National Register of Historic Places in 1992 as U.S. Post Office-Geneva.
