= George Vander Sluis =

American artist (1915–1984)

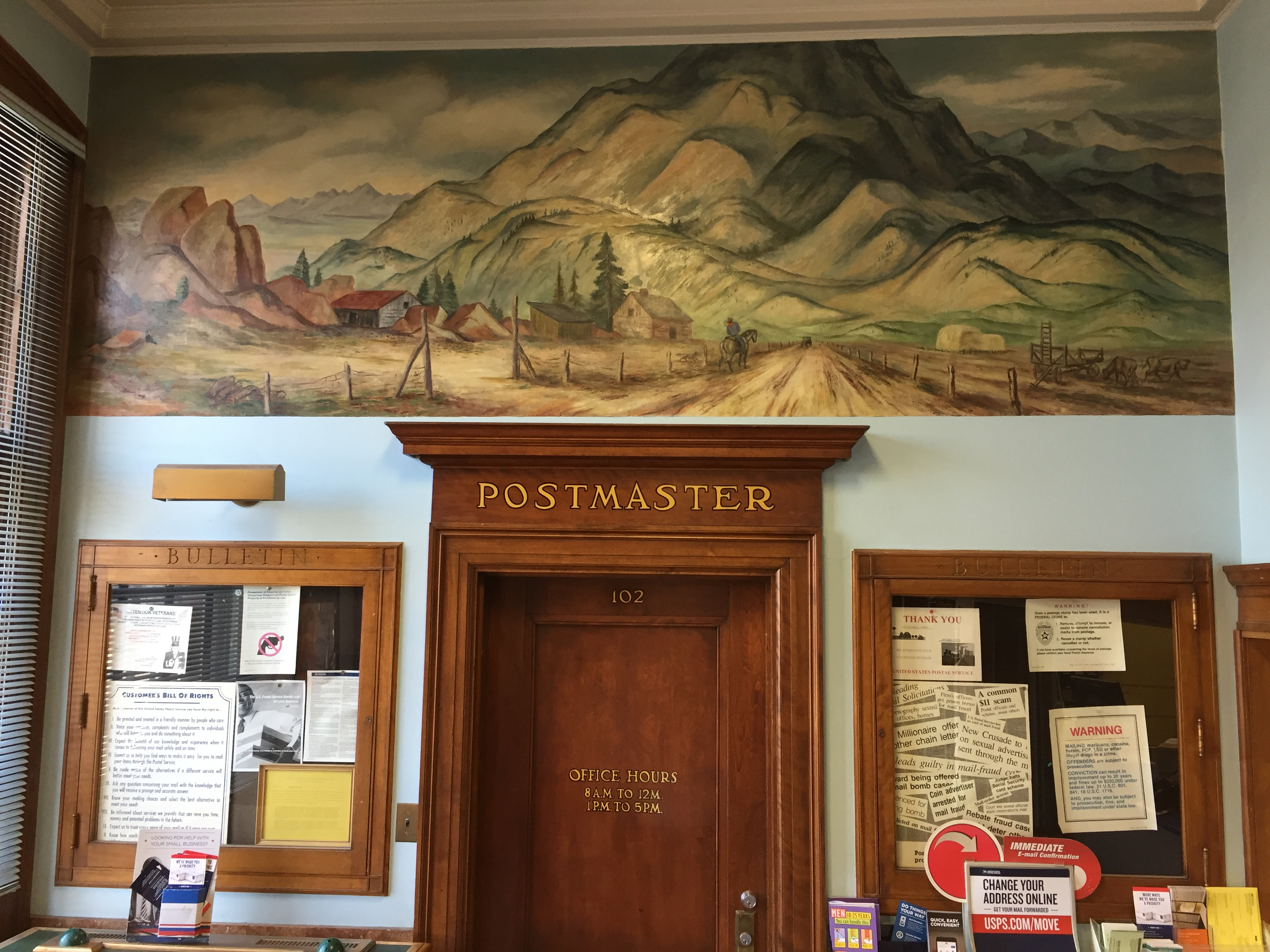
Colorado Landscape (1942), Section of Painting and Sculpture mural painted for the Rifle, Colorado, post office by George Vander Sluis

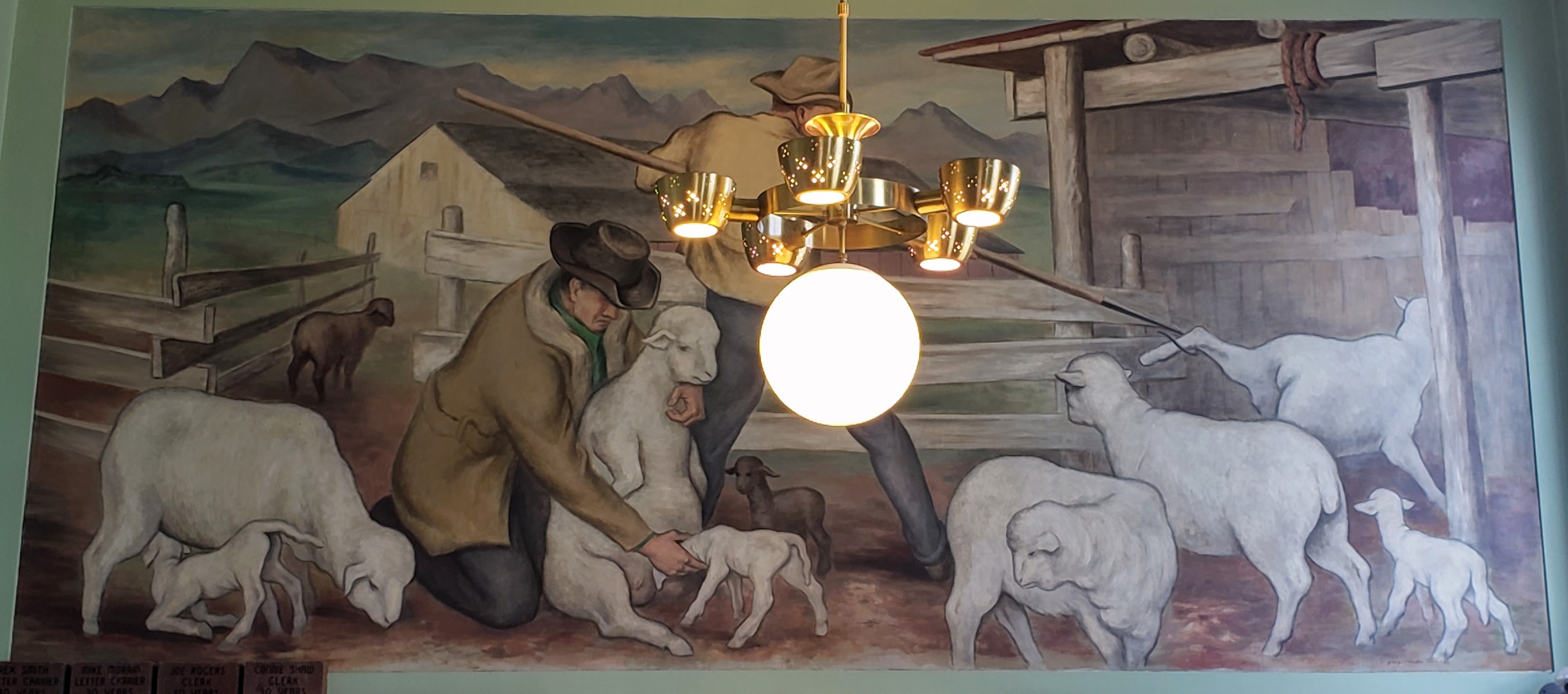
Farm Scene (1942), Vander Sluis mural in the post office of Riverton, Wyoming

George Vander Sluis (1915–1984) was an American artist known for his murals and postage stamp designs.

== Personal life ==
Sluis was born December 18, 1915, in Cleveland, Ohio. He was married and had three children with his wife, Hildegarde Bristol Vander Sluis, who survived to 2009.

== Work ==
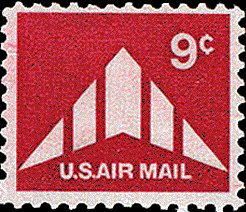
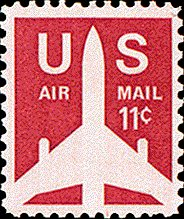
Vander Sluis designed two 1971 United States Air Mail stamps.

Serving in the United States Army in World War II, Vander Sluis was one of the 1,100 members of the Ghost Army, a secret tactical deception unit that was awarded the Congressional Gold Medal in 2022. After the war he was a member of the art faculty at Syracuse University for 35 years. Just before his death, Vander Sluis painted a mural on the front of the Hendricks Chapel at Syracuse. He painted a New Deal program mural in the U.S. Post Office at Rifle, Colorado, in 1942, which is described in the listing of the building in the National Register of Historic Places. He also designed stamps for the United States Postal Service.

The Akron Art Museum holds a Sluis work titled Decayed Glory.
