= United States Post Office (Rifle, Colorado) =

- US Post Office-Rifle Main
- U.S. National Register of Historic Places
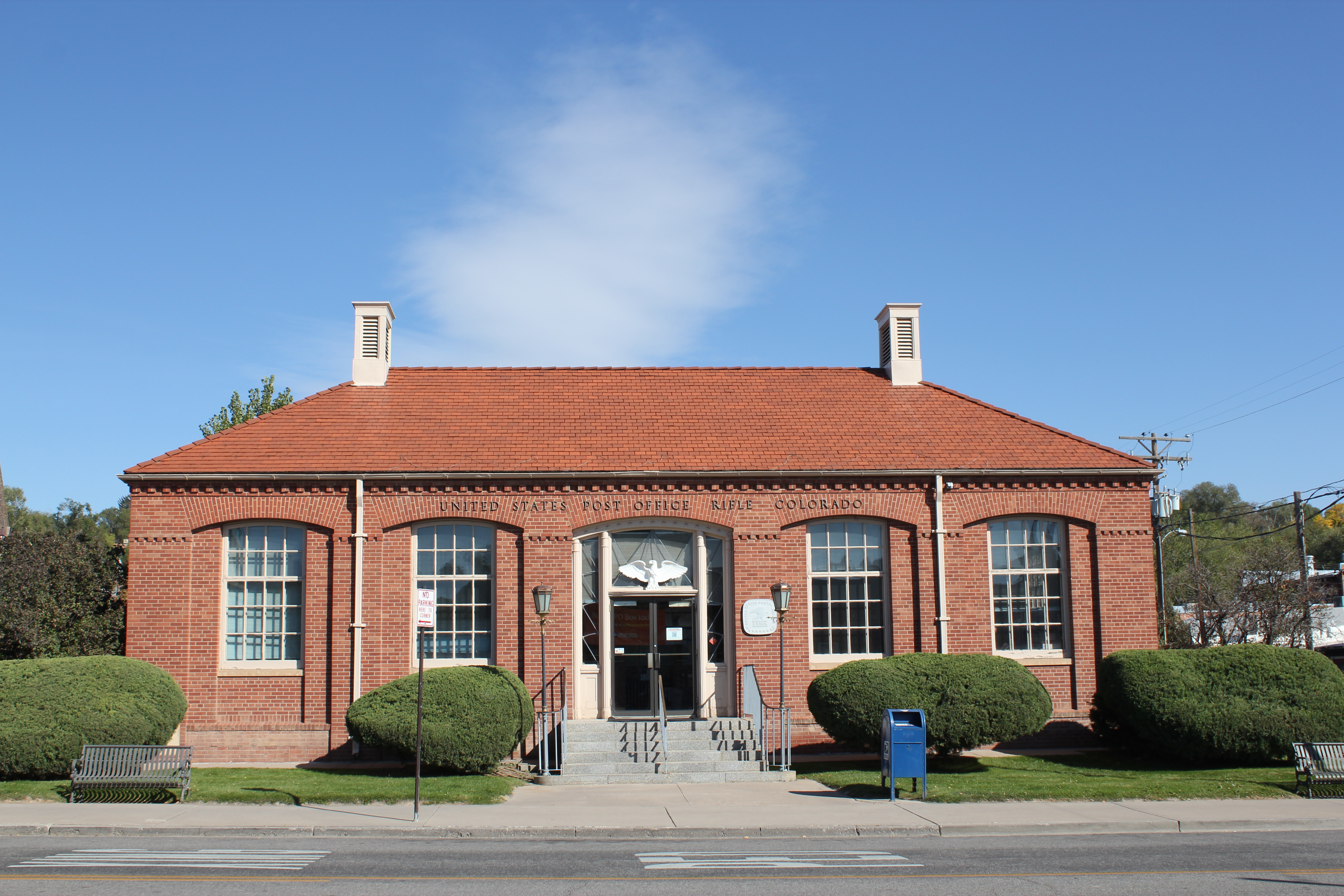
- Rifle Post Office, October 2012

- Location within Colorado
- Location: Railroad Avenue and Fourth Street; Rifle, Colorado; United States
- Coordinates: 39°31′57″N 107°47′02″W
- Area: 0.4 acres (0.16 ha)
- Built: 1940
- Built by: Joseph Sebacher Construction Co.
- Architect: Louis A. Simon
- Architectural style: Colonial Revival
- MPS: US Post Offices in Colorado, 1900--1941, TR
- NRHP reference No.: 86000186
- Added to NRHP: January 24, 1986

The Rifle Main Post Office, at Railroad Avenue and Fourth Street in Rifle, Colorado, United States, was built in 1940. It includes a New Deal mural. It was listed on the National Register of Historic Places in 1986.

== Description ==
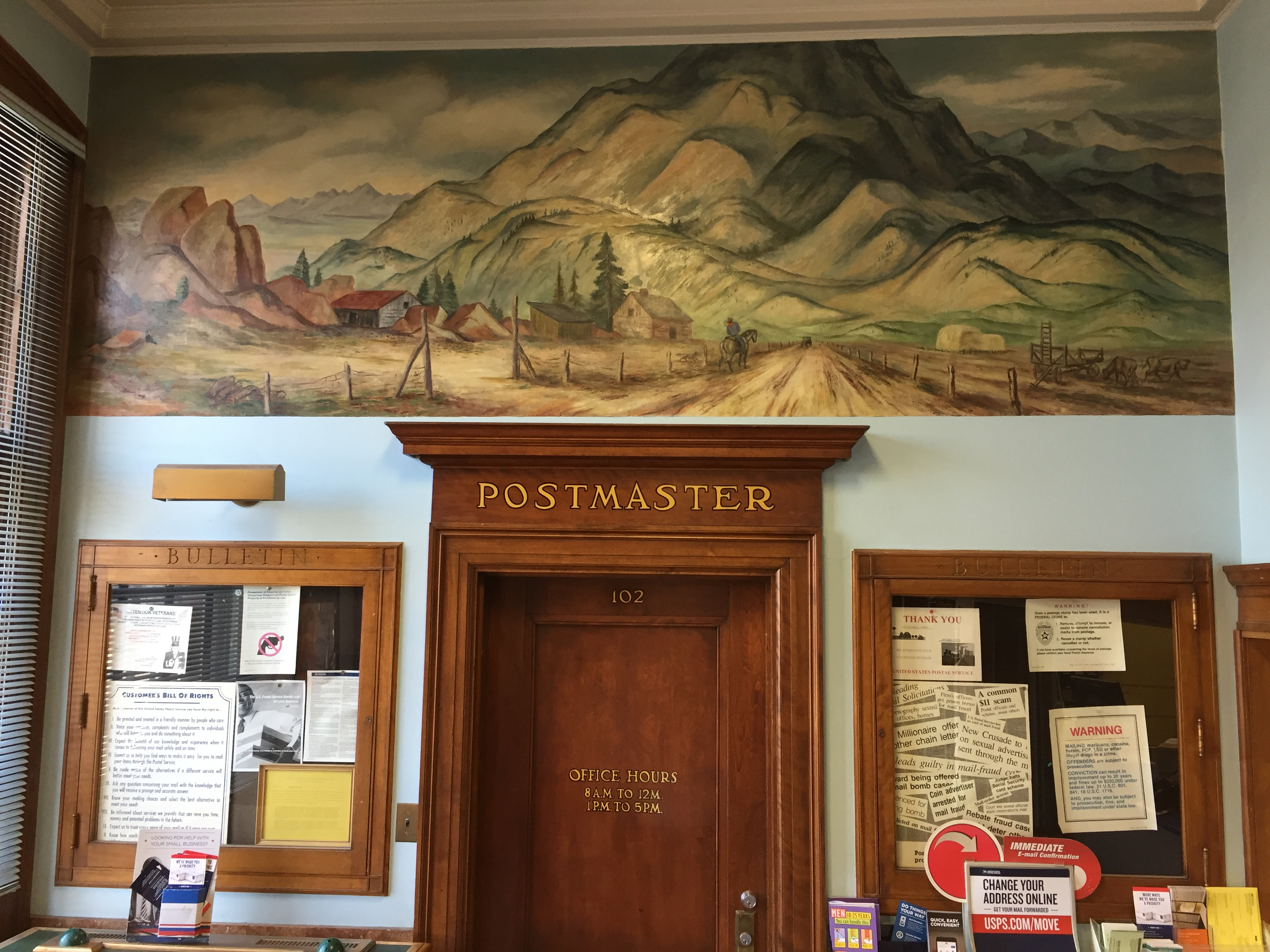
Post office interior and mural, July 2018

The building's design, generally Classical Revival and with Colonial Revival details, is credited to Louis A. Simon.

The mural mounted above the Postmaster's office door, titled "Colorado Landscape", was painted on canvas in 1942 by artist George Vander Sluis (1915-1984).

An information sheet posted below the mural reports that Sluis based the painting on sketches near Rifle, but that it does not depict any specific scene.

== See also ==
- National Register of Historic Places listings in Garfield County, Colorado
- List of United States post office murals
