= Xavier Gonzalez =

American artist

- Born: 1898; Almeria, Spain
- Died: 1993 (aged 94–95); Bronx, New York, U.S.
- Known for: Mural painting, Sculpture
- Spouse: Ethel Edwards

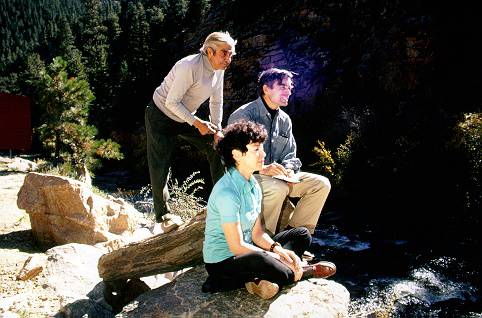
Gonzalez at left, with Chris Karras and Ethel Edwards.

Xavier Gonzalez (1898–1993) was an American artist. He was born in Almeria, Spain. He lived in Argentina and Mexico for some time, and was planning on becoming an engineer in a gold mine. In 1925, he immigrated to the United States.

== Education ==
Gonzalez began his studies at the Art Institute of Chicago from 1921 to 1923, and his uncle, José Arpa, studied with him there. He also studied at the San Carlos Academy in Mexico City, as well as in Paris and in the Far East. In 1931, Gonzalez became a US citizen, and in 1935, he married fellow artist Ethel Edwards (1914–1999), who was seventeen years his junior and also his student at Newcomb College. He often worked and studied with fellow artist Julius Woeltz, who was the best man at his wedding. Gonzales commandeered the canteen wall at Newcomb for the use of his art students.

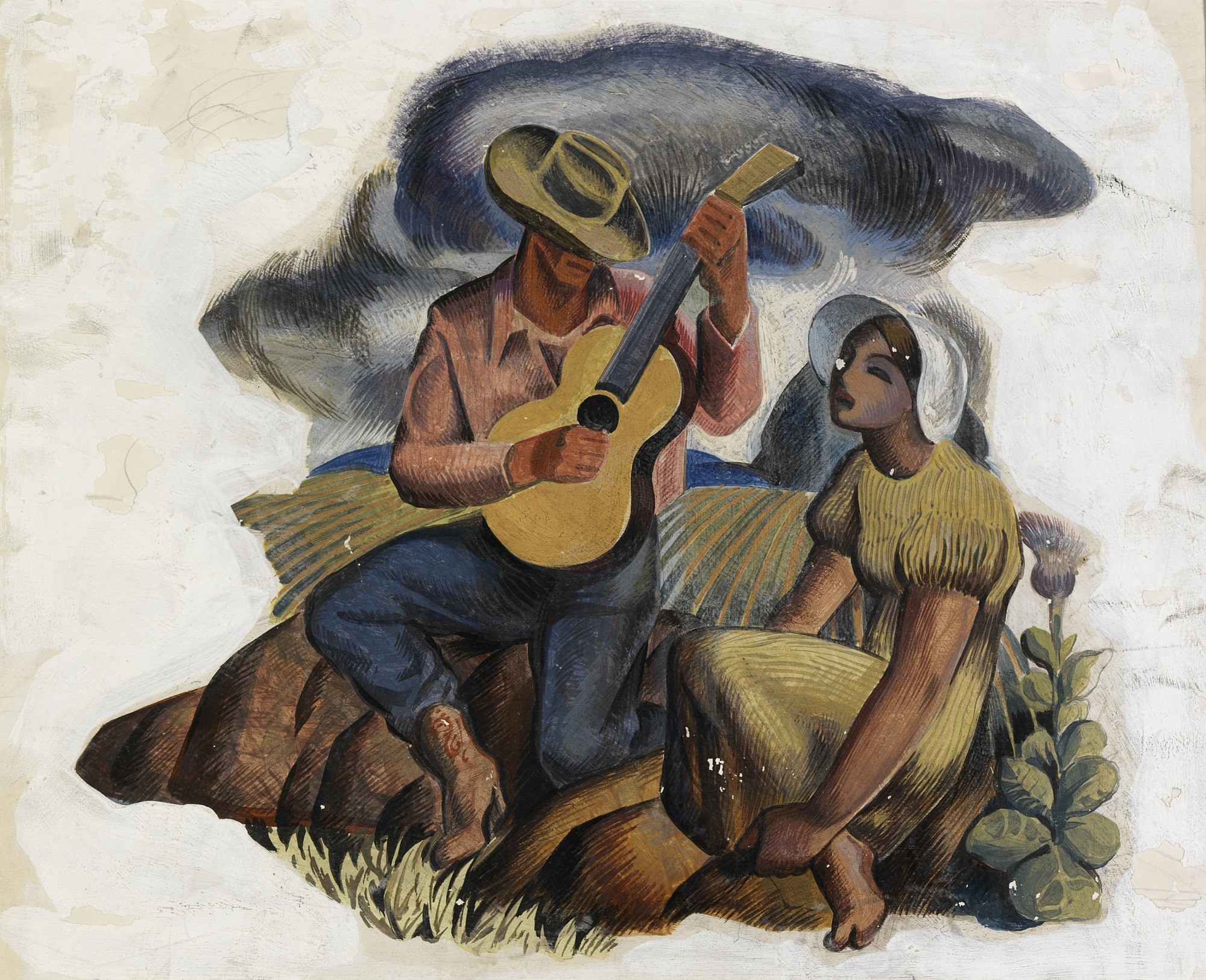
study for Works Progress Administration mural painted by Gonzalez for the postoffice in Kilgore, Texas.

== Works ==
Gonzalez's works have been displayed throughout the United States, at the Corcoran Gallery of Art, the Whitney Museum of American Art, the Metropolitan Museum of Art. He was also well known in Paris, Venice, Brussels and Tokyo. He taught art at Tulane University, the Brooklyn Museum, Case Western Reserve University, and the Newcomb Memorial School of Art, and was the director of the art school at Sul Ross State Teachers College in Alpine, Texas. In 1953, he was elected to the National Academy of Design as an Associate member, then became a full Academician in 1955. He illustrated a children's book called "He Who Saw Everything, The Epic of Gilgamesh" by Anita Feagles (1966).

Gonzalez died of leukemia in 1993, at the age of 94, at Calvary Hospital in the Bronx, New York City.

== Murals ==
- Covington, Louisiana, Tung Oil Industry, 1939, oil on canvas
- Hammond, Louisiana, Strawberry Farming, 1937, oil on canvas
- Huntsville, Alabama, Tennessee Valley Authority, Federal Courthouse, oil on canvas
- Kilgore, Texas, Pioneer Saga, 1941, oil on canvas
- Kilgore, Texas, Drilling for Oil, 1941, oil on canvas
- Kilgore, Texas, Music of Plains, 1941. oil on canvas
- Kilgore, Texas, Contemporary Youth, 1941. oil on canvas

His wife, Ethel Edwards painted 2 murals; one titled Life on the Lake in 1942 at the Lake Providence, Louisiana post office and the other, titled Afternoon on a Texas Ranch, completed in 1941 at the Lampasas, Texas post office.
