= Ethel Magafan =

American painter and muralist

- Ethel Magafan at Palisades Reservoir, Minidoka Project, Idaho
- Born: August 10, 1916; Chicago, Illinois
- Died: April 24, 1993 (aged 76); Woodstock, New York
- Education: Colorado Springs Fine Arts Center
- Notable work: Andrew Jackson at the Battle of New Orleans, January 8, 1814 (1943); Cotton Pickers (1940); Prairie Fire (1941); The Horse Corral (1942)
- Style: mural
- Website: http://www.magafanmuralproject.com

Ethel Magafan (August 10, 1916 – April 24, 1993) was an American painter and muralist.

== Early life ==
Magafan was born in Chicago to Greek parents who had recently immigrated to the U.S. The family soon relocated to Colorado Springs, Colorado, and Magafan's artistic training occurred at the Colorado Springs Fine Arts Center under the tutelage of Peppino Mangravite, Boardman Robinson and Frank Mechau, who hired Magafan and her identical twin sister, Jenne Magafan, to assist on mural projects. In 1937, Ethel won the commission to paint a mural in the U.S. post office in Auburn, Nebraska, making her the youngest recipient of such a commission. It would be the first of seven government-sponsored commissions for the artist.

== Murals ==
"Andrew Jackson at the Battle of New Orleans, January 8, 1814" E. Magafan, 1943

Under President Franklin Roosevelt's New Deal, several programs were created to employ Americans during the Great Depression. The Magafan twins worked under the New Deal's Section of Painting and Sculpture, a program that hired thousands of artists to paint murals in public spaces, particularly post offices. Ethel and her twin sister, Jenne Magafan, became widely known for their murals painted during the Great Depression. Ethel received her first of seven Government commissions when she was commissioned to produce a painting for the United States post office in Auburn, Nebraska, titled Threshing. Other murals commissioned by the US Government hang in the United States Senate Chamber, the Social Security Building and the Recorder Deeds Building in Washington, D.C., and in post offices in Wynne, Arkansas, titled Cotton Pickers in 1940; in Madill, Oklahoma, titled Prairie Fire in 1941; and Englewood, Colorado, titled The Horse Corral in 1942. Her final mural, entitled Grant in the Wilderness, was installed in 1979 in the Chancellorsville Visitor Center at the Fredericksburg National Memorial Military Park in Virginia,

She was a member of the National Academy of Design.

== Later life ==
In 1951 Ethel won a Fulbright Scholarship to Greece where she and her husband, Bruce Currie, spent 1951-52.

== Death ==
Magafan died April 24, 1993, in Woodstock, New York, at the age of 76.

== Awards ==
Her many awards include, among others:

- Stacey Scholarship (1947)
- Tiffany Fellowship (1949)
- Fulbright Grant (1951-52)
- Tiffany Fellowship (1949)
- Benjamin Altman Landscape Prize, National Academy of Design (1955)
- Medal of Honor, Audubon, Artists (1962)
- Henry Ward Granger Fund Purchase Award, National Academy of Design (1964)
- Childe Hassam Fund Purchase Award, American Academy of Arts and Letters (1970)
- Silver Medal, Audubon Artists (1983)
- Champion International Corporation Award, Silvermine Guild, New Canaan, Connecticut (1984)
- John Taylor Award, Woodstock Artists Association, Woodstock, New York (1985)
- Harrison Cady Award, American Watercolor Society (1987)
- Grumbacher Gold Medal, Audubon Artists (1990)
