= Edward Chavez (artist) =

American artist (1917–1995)

- Born: 1917; Wagon Mound, New Mexico, U.S.
- Died: 1995 (aged 77–78); Woodstock, New York, U.S.
- Occupation: Artist

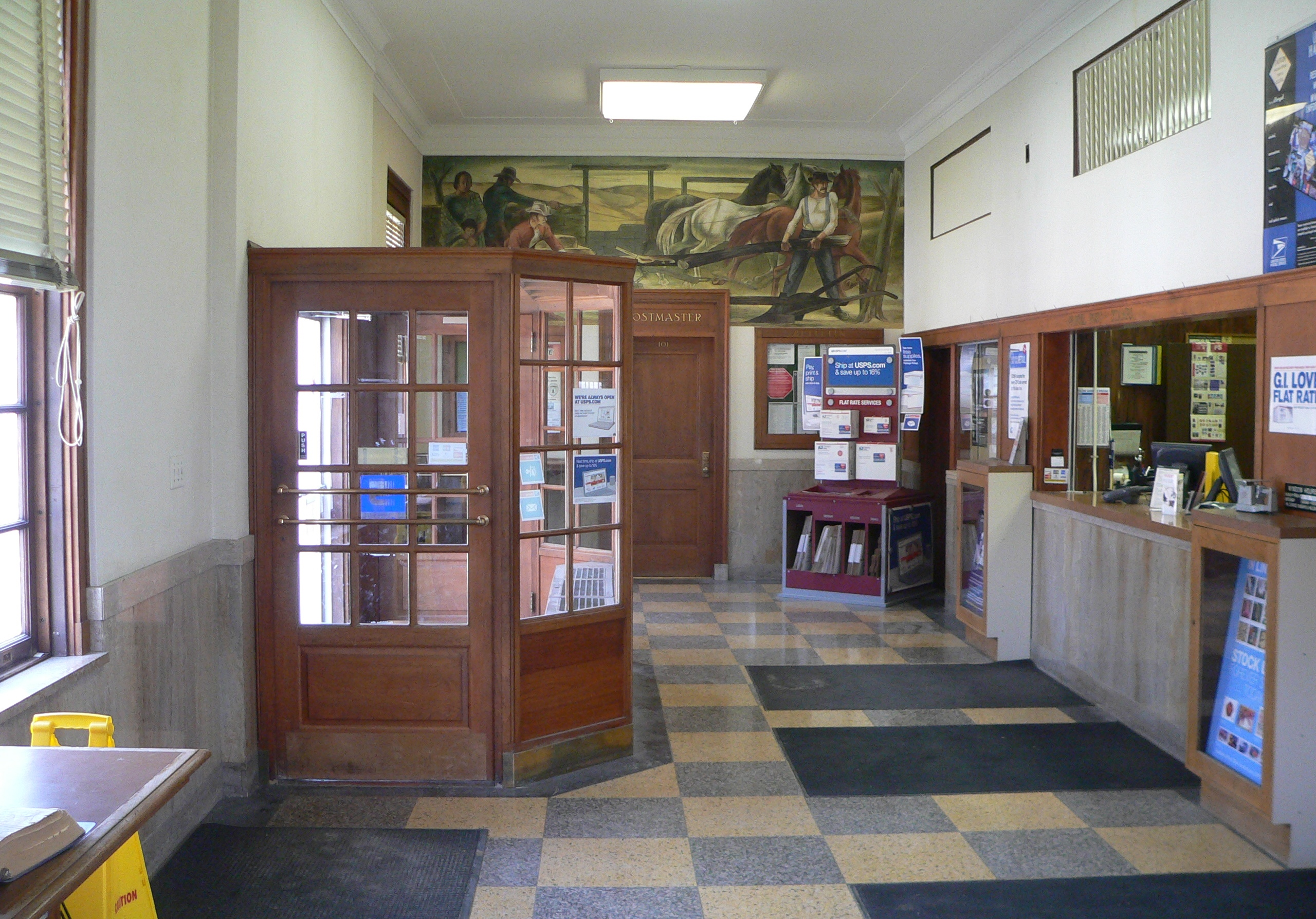
Geneva, Nebraska post office interior with a mural by Edward Chavez, Building a Sod House.

Edward Arcenio Chavez (1917–1995) was an American artist. His work straddled realism, expressionism, and abstraction; often incorporating both elements of modernism and his heritage as a New Mexican Hispanic and Native American artist. He was an artist with the Treasury Relief Art Project during the Great Depression of the 1930s. He also worked for the Section of Painting and Sculpture, painting a mural in the post office in Geneva, Nebraska, in 1941. His painting Colt can be found at the Museum of Modern Art. His work is also included in the collection at the Woodstock Artists Association and Museum.

== Biography ==
Chavez was born in Wagonmound, New Mexico. At the age of five he moved to Colorado with his parents and siblings. He began to pursue art after graduating high school, with encouragement from his art teacher. He worked as an apprentice to artist Frank Mechau while he attended the Colorado Springs Fine Arts Center, studying under Boardman Robinson and Peppino Mangravite. Later, Chavez would paint multiple murals for the Works Progress Administration during the Great Depression of the 1930s, as well as serve as a war artist and correspondent during World War II. He finally set up his studio in Woodstock, New York, an art colony, where he lived and produced art until his death.

== Career ==
=== Overview ===
Chavez worked with the Treasury Department's Section of the Fine Arts (SFA), the Works Progress Administration (WPA), and the Treasury Relief Art Project (TRAP) during the Great Depression to create and assist with the creation of multiple post office murals in Texas, Nebraska, and Colorado. Funded by the Works Progress Administration's Fine Art Project, he created a mural for Denver's West High School, and he was commissioned by the Treasury Relief Art Project for a mural for the Center, Texas, post office, as well as a mural for the Glenwood Springs, Colorado, post office, which he and Jenne Magafan, a fellow art student and assistant to Mechau, collaborated to make.

In 1942, Chavez won a Life magazine competition for his watercolor painting entitled Convoy Practice, which he made while serving in World War II as an artist documenting the war. After the war, he married Jenne Magafan and they settled in Woodstock. Jenne and her twin sister, Ethel, also an artist, accompanied Chavez on a Fulbright scholarship trip to study in Italy. In Woodstock, he taught at multiple schools, including the Art Students League and Syracuse University School of Art, as well as co-founded the Woodstock School of Art in 1968.

=== Painting Section ===
The Treasury Department's Section of the Fine Arts (referred to as just “the Section”) commissioned paintings and sculptures for new buildings, mostly post offices and courthouses, during the time of the Great Depression. Commissions were given through anonymous competitions, open to artists nationwide, and designs were chosen based on artistic quality and merit. Every entry was judged by national and local committees of arts professionals. Once evaluated by the local jury, the chosen entries were sent to the Section, where they would be evaluated again by a top-level jury. If the Section was in agreement with the jury's selection, the winner was announced. Section murals were meant to remind Americans of the qualities of their communities and provide hope of a better and stable future.

Chavez assisted Mechau with the making of several murals under the Section, along with the help of the Magafan twins, who he would often travel with and aid in the installation of their own murals. Although it was difficult for artists to cover the expense of travel and research for Section commissions, and they often paid less than they cost to complete, Chavez was able to relay his success in his commissions into a gallery career.

=== Mural for Geneva, Nebraska ===
Chavez's 1941 mural for the Treasury Relief Art Project and the Works Progress Administration (WPA), in the post office in Geneva, Nebraska, is entitled Building a Sod House. Chavez created two entry sketches for the Geneva mural. One sketch shows livestock feeding at a haystack, and the other depicts pioneers building a sod house. Director Edward Rowan instructed Chavez to proceed with the completion of the second sketch after making a slight revision to the spatial qualities of a figure on the left side of the composition.

=== Mural for Center, Texas ===
Chavez's 1941 mural in the center, Texas, post office is entitled Logging Scene. He was directed by the Section to provide three submissions: a small-scale sketch done in pencil, a colored rendering of the sketch at the same scale, and a full-size black and white drawing of the finished work. He also had to provide a photograph of the completed painting. The painting depicts teamsters unloading logs from a wagon, suggesting the time frame was set in the past, as the pine lumber industry had moved on to use more modern trucks.

== Works ==
- New Mexico, from the United States series (Smithsonian American Art Museum, 1946–1949, gouache on board)
- Colt (Museum of Modern Art, 1949, gouache on board)
- Untitled (soldiers) (Museum of Nebraska Art, watercolor)
- Building a Sod House (Post office mural, Geneva, Nebraska, 1941, oil on canvas)
- Logging Scene (Post office mural, Center, Texas, 1941, oil on canvas)
- Decorative Map (Post office mural, Glenwood Springs, Colorado, 1937, oil on canvas)
