= Jenne Magafan =

American artist

- Born: 1916; Chicago, IL
- Died: 1952 (aged 35–36); Albany, NY
- Education: Broadmoor Art Academy in Colorado Springs
- Known for: Painting
- Notable work: Cowboy Dance, A Typical Western Town, S.F. Ruins No. 1, The Windmill

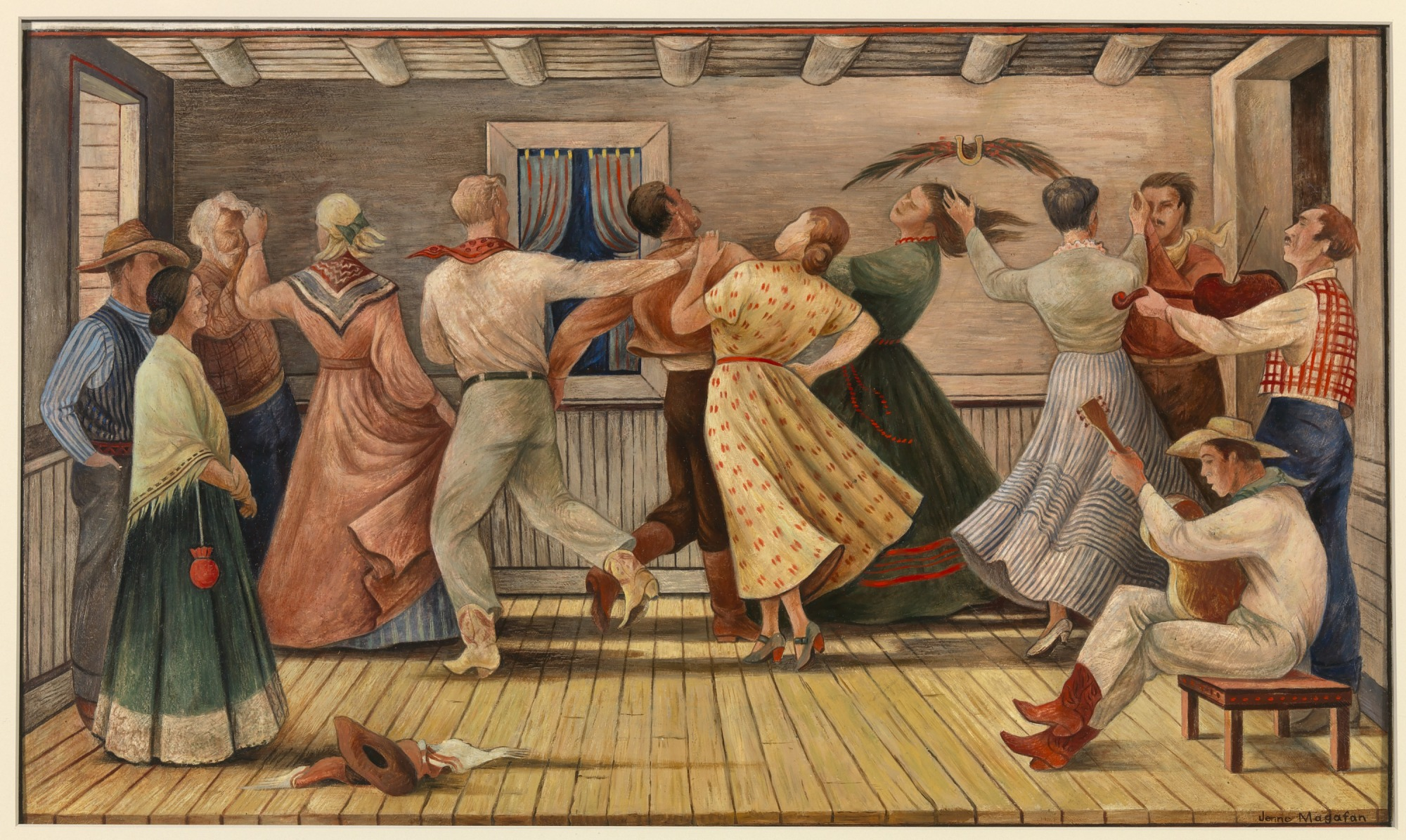
Study for Cowboy Dance (1941), Magafan's mural at the U.S. post office in Anson, Texas

Jenne Magafan (1916–1952) was an American painter and muralist. During her short-lived career, she became a successful mural painter in the 1930s and early 1940s. She gained national prominence for her work in the New Deal art program. Her twin sister Ethel Magafan was also a muralist.

Her 1941 mural Cowboy Dance is located in the Anson, Texas, post office. Her work is also included in the collections of the Smithsonian American Art Museum, the Kirkland Museum of Fine & Decorative Art and the Carnegie Museum of Art.

She died of a brain aneurysm in 1952, aged 36, at Albany Hospital.

== Early life and education ==
Magafan, and her identical twin sister, Ethel Magafan, were born in Chicago, Illinois. Due to health concerns with their father, the family moved to Colorado Springs, Colorado, and then to Denver, Colorado.

Both Jenne and Ethel attended East High School in Denver. When in high school, the Magafan twins impressed artist Frank Mechau, and their mentor and art teacher, Helen Perry, paid for their sessions with Mechau, in hopes the twins would succeed artistically.

Jenne and Ethel were invited by Frank Mechau to apprentice with him at his Redstone studio in Redstone, Colorado. In 1936, Jenne was awarded the Carter Memorial Art Scholarship and shared it with her sister so they could both attend the Colorado Springs Fine Arts Center, formally the Broadmoor Art Academy, in Colorado Springs. Mechau then hired them as assistants, and they subsequently entered into careers as muralists, working at first with Mechau and then with Italian-American Modernist painter, Peppino Mangravite, and Boardman Robinson. Mechau encouraged the two to enter competitions sponsored by the U.S. Treasury Department's Section of Fine Arts. The sisters painted Works Progress Administration (WPA), federal government commissioned, murals in midwestern and western states, some as the sole artist and others as Mechau's assistants.

== Career ==
In 1939, Jenne was awarded her first commission for a mural at the Albion, Nebraska, Post Office. This would be the first of seven commissions. Jenne was awarded five mural commissions for various United States post offices and other government buildings from 1937 to 1943.

Jenne assisted Mechau on several of these commissions. For the Glenwood Springs Post Office, the two artists and another assistant, Edward Chavez, painted Wild Horse Race in 1937. That same year, also for Glenwood Springs, Jenne and Edward painted Decorative Map. The three artists also collaborated on Indian Fight and The Corral for the Colorado Springs Post Office, located in Building 41 of the Denver Federal Center. Jenne also painted murals for post offices in Anson, Texas, and Helper, Utah.

She collaborated with her sister Ethel on a mural for the Social Security Building (now the Department of Health, Education and Welfare) in c. 1942 in Washington, D.C.

Meeting the artists Doris Lee and Arnold Blanch in Los Angeles, the twins learned of the art colony in Woodstock, New York, and traveled there in 1945. That same year, their work was exhibited at the Los Angeles Museum of Art and the National Academy of Design.

== Later years ==
After World War II, Jenne, her husband, Edward Chavez, and her sister, Ethel, relocated to the art colony in Woodstock, New York, where they remained the rest of their lives.

Jenne received a Tiffany Foundation Fellowship (1949, 1950) and in 1951-1952 she painted in Italy. She died of a brain aneurysm in 1952, aged 36, at Albany Hospital.

== Legacy ==
Examples of her work are in many venues, including the Grafton Street Junior High School, Worcester, Massachusetts; Woodstock Artist’s Association, New York; and others. Magafan showed work primarily at the Ganso Gallery, New York City; at her memorial exhibition at the Ganso Gallery, homage was paid by her fellow artists, including Yasuo Kuniyoshi, Peppino Mangravite, Fletcher Martin, and Eugene Speicher.

She had solo exhibitions at the Denver Art Museum and the Santa Barbara Museum of Art and participated in group exhibitions at the Colorado Springs Fine Arts Center, Denver Art Museum, Art Institute of Chicago, Los Angeles Museum of Art and Claremont College.

== Works ==
Some of the non-mural paintings by Magafan are:

- Church in Leadville (Colorado) 1938
- Western Town (mural study, Helper, Utah Post Office) ca. 1939-1943
- Cowboy Dance (mural study, Anson Texas Post Office), 1941
- Cornstalks, 1955

== Awards ==
Some of the awards Magafan received are:

- State of Colorado Arts and Humanities Award
- 1949-50 – Tiffany Foundation Fellowship
- 1971: State of Colorado Arts and Humanities Award
- Honored by Historic Denver as part of the Colorado 100.

== Commissions ==
Some of the commissioned works by Magafan not discussed above are:

- Ceiling in drawing room, commissioned by Mrs. Gerald Hughes, Denver, 1936
- History of Costume (five murals), Neusteter's, Denver, 1937
- Mural room and ranch bar, Albany Hotel, Denver, 1937
- WPA mural, Cattle Round-up, US Treasury Department, Eureka, Kansas, 1938
- Land Rush, Treasury Department, Sayre, Oklahoma, 1940.

== Exhibitions ==
- 1934, 1935, 1938 to 1942 – Denver Art Museum, Colorado
- 1930-49 - International Watercolors, Art Institute of Chicago
- 1940 – Contemporary Arts, New York City
- 1940 – Utah Arts Center, Salt Lake City
- 1944 – Santa Barbara Museum of Art, California
- 1944 – Raymond & Raymond Gallery, Los Angeles, California
- 1944 – Scripps College, Claremont, California
- 1950 – Ganso Gallery, New York City
- Contemporary American Painting, University of Illinois, 1952
- 1952 – Woodstock Artists Association, New York, Memorial Exhibition
- 1954 – Albany Institute of History and Art, New York, Memorial Exhibition
- Artists West of the Mississippi, Colorado Springs Fine Arts Center, 1965
- 73rd Western Anninversary, Denver Art Museum, 1971
- 1975 – Long Island University, New York, Retrospective Exhibition
- 1975 – Ulster County Community College, Stone Ridge, New York, Retrospective Exhibition
- 1976 – Rome Art and Community Center, New York, Retrospective Exhibition

== Works Held ==
Among the collections that hold her works are:

- Kirkland Museum of Fine & Decorative Art, Colorado
- Colby College Museum of Art, Maine
- The John H. Vanderpoel Art Association, Illinois.
