= Julius Woeltz =

American artist

- Born: Julius Woeltz; 1911; San Antonio, Texas
- Died: 1956 (aged 44–45); San Antonio, Texas
- Known for: Landscape art, Murals

Julius Edwin Woeltz (1911–1956) was an American artist known for his murals and landscapes.

== Biography ==
Woeltz was born in San Antonio, Texas, where he first began his art studies under Jose Arpa and alongside Xavier Gonzales. He went on to attend the Academie Julian in France and later the Art Institute of Chicago. In addition to painting, he worked as an art professor for various colleges and universities, including the University of Texas at Austin and Sul Ross State Teachers College where he served as the art director in 1932 and started the summer art colony program.

Throughout his career, he painted several regional murals, notably a series of large murals in Alpine, Texas as well as six murals for the U.S. Post Office in Amarillo, Texas. These murals tended to depict landscapes and activities of the surrounding region depicted in the Regionalist style popularized by Thomas Hart Benton. He regularly spent time in Mexico studying the muralists there, and appears to have been influenced by Diego Rivera and Jose Clemente Orozco.

Several of his works were commissioned and funded by the WPA and The Section. In his lifetime, his work was displayed in numerous exhibitions, including the Legion of Honor Museum, the Dallas Museum of Fine Arts, and M. Knoedler & Company.

He died in San Antonio, Texas in 1956 and is buried in the Fort Sam Houston National Cemetery.

== Works ==
Public Commissioned Works

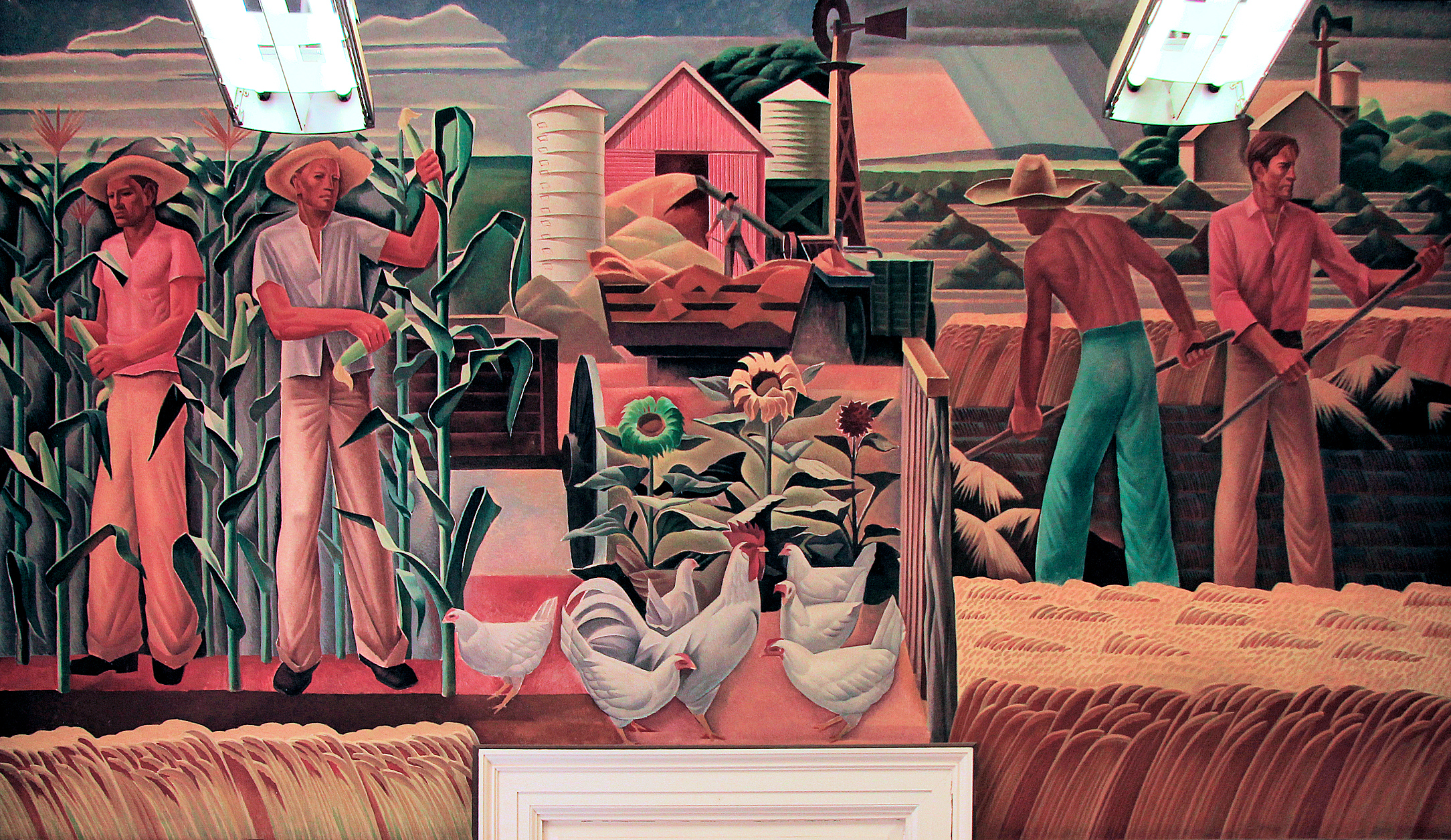
Texas Farm, 1940

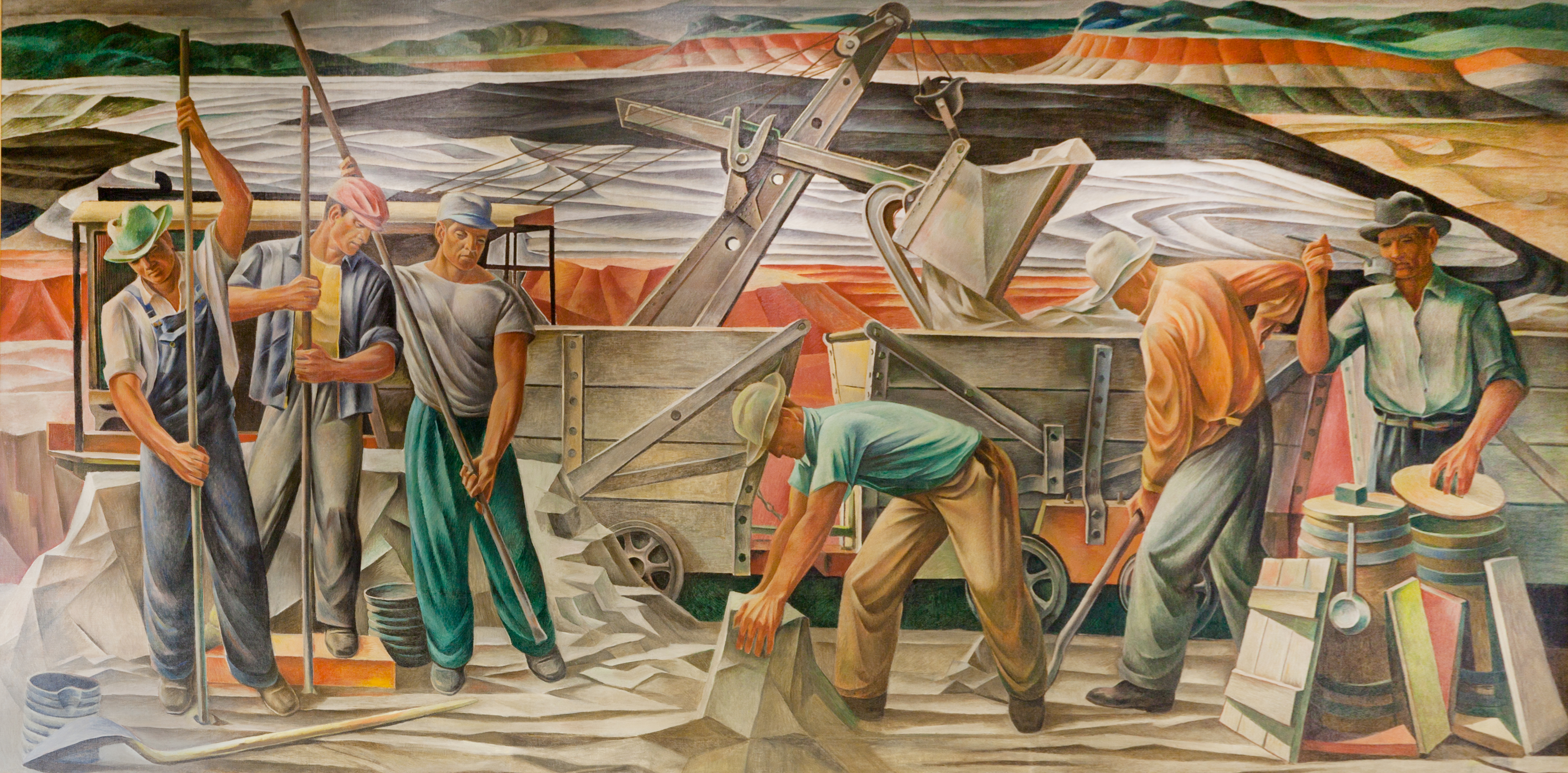
The Bauxite Mines, 1942

Cattle Loading

Coronado’s Exploration Party

Oil

Coronado’s Exploration Party in the Palo Duro Canyon
