= Hebron, Nebraska =

City in and county seat of Thayer County, Nebraska, united States

- City
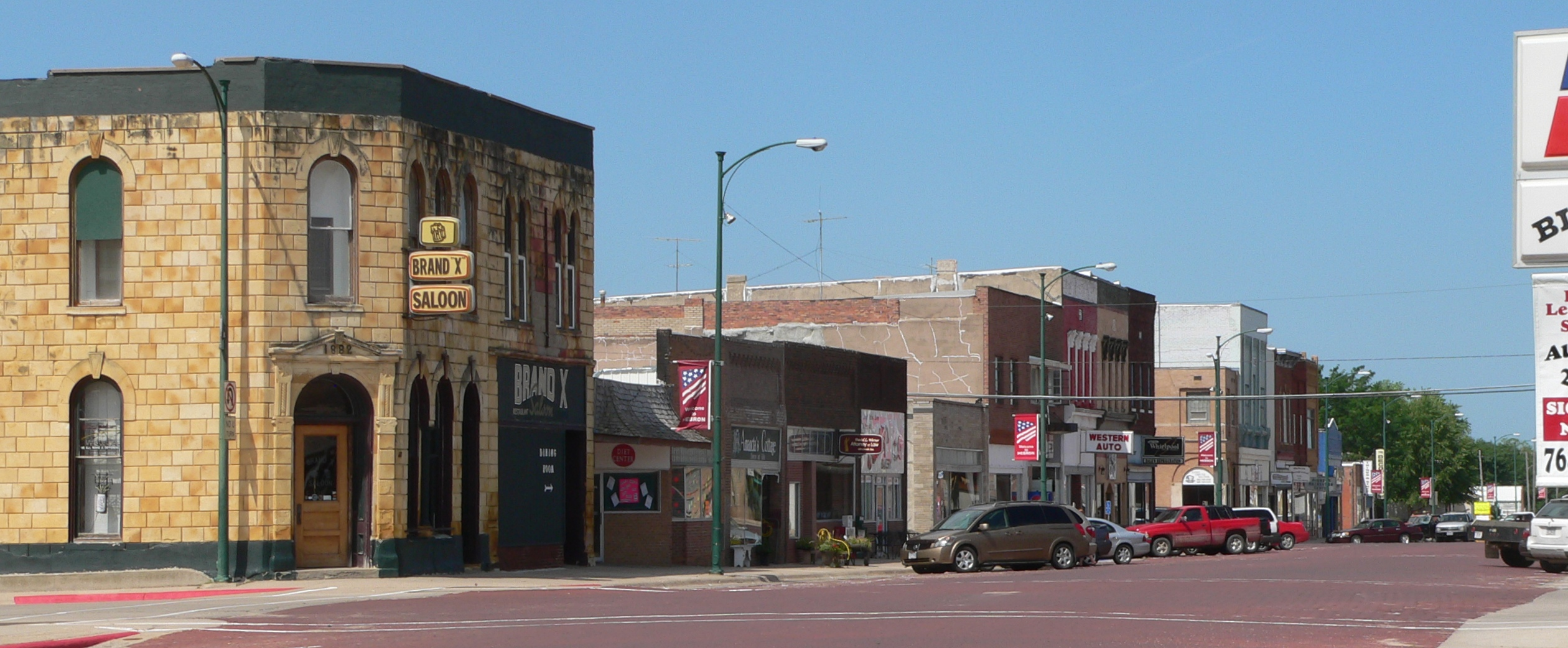
- Lincoln Avenue, looking southwest from 5th Street, July 2010

- Location of Hebron, Nebraska
- Coordinates: 40°10′07″N 97°35′11″W
- Country: United States
- State: Nebraska
- County: Thayer

Area
  - Total: 1.46 sq mi (3.79 km^{2})
  - Land: 1.46 sq mi (3.79 km^{2})
  - Water: 0 sq mi (0.00 km^{2})
- Elevation: 1,473 ft (449 m)

Population (2020)
  - Total: 1,458
  - Estimate (2021): 1,408
  - Density: 996/sq mi (385/km^{2})
- Time zone: UTC-6 (Central (CST))
  - Summer (DST): UTC-5 (CDT)
- ZIP code: 68370
- Area code: 402
- FIPS code: 31-21905
- GNIS feature ID: 2394343
- Website: www.hebronnebraska.us

Hebron is a city in and the county seat of Thayer County, Nebraska, United States. The population was 1,441 at the 2020 census.

== History ==
Hebron was founded about 1869 by a colony of Disciples of Christ. It was named after the ancient city of Hebron.

The historic Hebron United States Post Office, now on the U.S. National Register of Historic Places, was built in the town in 1937 by architect Louis A. Simon.

A tornado in 1953 caused severe damage.

In 2021, the United States Department of Agriculture announced that a large well site would be constructed in a field near Hebron, a major part of a larger bid to improve water infrastructure for farmers across the state of Nebraska and neighboring Kansas.

== Demographics ==
Historical population
Census	Pop.	Note	%±
1880	466		—
1890	1,502		222.3%
1900	1,511		0.6%
1910	1,778		17.7%
1920	1,513		−14.9%
1930	1,804		19.2%
1940	1,909		5.8%
1950	2,000		4.8%
1960	1,920		−4.0%
1970	1,667		−13.2%
1980	1,906		14.3%
1990	1,765		−7.4%
2000	1,565		−11.3%
2010	1,579		0.9%
2020	1,458		−7.7%
2021 (est.)	1,408		−3.4%
U.S. Decennial Census

=== 2010 census ===
As of the census of 2010, there were 1,579 people, 698 households, and 402 families living in the city. The population density was 1,119.9 inhabitants per square mile (432.4/km^{2}). There were 791 housing units at an average density of 561.0 per square mile (216.6/km^{2}). The racial makeup of the city was 97.7% White, 0.4% African American, 0.1% Native American, 0.5% Asian, 0.3% from other races, and 0.9% from two or more races. Hispanic or Latino of any race were 1.5% of the population.

There were 698 households, of which 21.1% had children under the age of 18 living with them, 49.7% were married couples living together, 5.0% had a female householder with no husband present, 2.9% had a male householder with no wife present, and 42.4% were non-families. 39.0% of all households were made up of individuals, and 23.3% had someone living alone who was 65 years of age or older. The average household size was 2.09 and the average family size was 2.77.

The median age in the city was 51.3 years. 18.4% of residents were under the age of 18; 6.1% were between the ages of 18 and 24; 18.2% were from 25 to 44; 27.2% were from 45 to 64; and 30.1% were 65 years of age or older. The gender makeup of the city was 46.9% male and 53.1% female.

=== 2000 census ===
As of the census of 2000, there were 1,565 people, 700 households, and 417 families living in the city. The population density was 1,118.5 inhabitants per square mile (431.9/km^{2}). There were 761 housing units at an average density of 543.9 per square mile (210.0/km^{2}). The racial makeup of the city was 99.36% White, 0.19% Native American, 0.06% Asian, and 0.38% from two or more races. Hispanic or Latino of any race were 0.26% of the population.

There were 700 households, out of which 25.0% had children under the age of 18 living with them, 50.6% were married couples living together, 6.7% had a female householder with no husband present, and 40.3% were non-families. 38.9% of all households were made up of individuals, and 22.1% had someone living alone who was 65 years of age or older. The average household size was 2.15 and the average family size was 2.85.

In the city, the population was spread out, with 22.6% under the age of 18, 4.4% from 18 to 24, 21.9% from 25 to 44, 25.0% from 45 to 64, and 26.1% who were 65 years of age or older. The median age was 46 years. For every 100 females, there were 95.1 males. For every 100 females age 18 and over, there were 87.5 males.

As of 2000 the median income for a household in the city was $31,000, and the median income for a family was $39,524. Males had a median income of $30,655 versus $19,009 for females. The per capita income for the city was $20,505. About 4.9% of families and 9.5% of the population were below the poverty line, including 18.6% of those under age 18 and 7.2% of those age 65 or over.

== Geography ==
According to the United States Census Bureau, the city has a total area of 1.41 square miles (3.65 km^{2}), all land.

=== Climate ===
Climate data for Hebron, Nebraska (1991–2020 normals, extremes 1893–present)
Month	Jan	Feb	Mar	Apr	May	Jun	Jul	Aug	Sep	Oct	Nov	Dec	Year
Record high °F (°C)	78 (26)	80 (27)	97 (36)	100 (38)	102 (39)	110 (43)	113 (45)	110 (43)	112 (44)	100 (38)	86 (30)	74 (23)	113 (45)
Mean maximum °F (°C)	60.5 (15.8)	66.2 (19.0)	78.2 (25.7)	85.2 (29.6)	91.9 (33.3)	96.7 (35.9)	99.9 (37.7)	98.6 (37.0)	94.7 (34.8)	87.7 (30.9)	74.0 (23.3)	62.1 (16.7)	101.5 (38.6)
Mean daily maximum °F (°C)	36.6 (2.6)	41.3 (5.2)	53.4 (11.9)	64.1 (17.8)	73.7 (23.2)	84.4 (29.1)	88.6 (31.4)	86.6 (30.3)	79.8 (26.6)	67.2 (19.6)	52.4 (11.3)	40.1 (4.5)	64.0 (17.8)
Daily mean °F (°C)	25.5 (−3.6)	29.4 (−1.4)	40.4 (4.7)	50.9 (10.5)	61.6 (16.4)	72.6 (22.6)	76.9 (24.9)	74.8 (23.8)	66.6 (19.2)	53.7 (12.1)	39.9 (4.4)	29.2 (−1.6)	51.8 (11.0)
Mean daily minimum °F (°C)	14.5 (−9.7)	17.5 (−8.1)	27.4 (−2.6)	37.6 (3.1)	49.6 (9.8)	60.8 (16.0)	65.3 (18.5)	62.9 (17.2)	53.3 (11.8)	40.1 (4.5)	27.3 (−2.6)	18.2 (−7.7)	39.5 (4.2)
Mean minimum °F (°C)	−5.7 (−20.9)	−0.3 (−17.9)	8.7 (−12.9)	23.2 (−4.9)	35.2 (1.8)	48.8 (9.3)	54.8 (12.7)	52.4 (11.3)	38.5 (3.6)	22.7 (−5.2)	10.8 (−11.8)	0.9 (−17.3)	−9.5 (−23.1)
Record low °F (°C)	−25 (−32)	−34 (−37)	−18 (−28)	9 (−13)	20 (−7)	38 (3)	44 (7)	40 (4)	25 (−4)	9 (−13)	−11 (−24)	−26 (−32)	−34 (−37)
Average precipitation inches (mm)	0.80 (20)	0.82 (21)	1.70 (43)	2.74 (70)	5.26 (134)	4.39 (112)	4.57 (116)	3.52 (89)	2.60 (66)	2.33 (59)	1.30 (33)	1.05 (27)	31.08 (789)
Average snowfall inches (cm)	6.6 (17)	6.6 (17)	3.0 (7.6)	0.7 (1.8)	0.0 (0.0)	0.0 (0.0)	0.0 (0.0)	0.0 (0.0)	0.0 (0.0)	0.4 (1.0)	2.0 (5.1)	3.9 (9.9)	23.2 (59)
Average precipitation days (≥ 0.01 in)	4.9	4.8	7.6	9.0	11.6	10.0	9.6	9.2	7.1	6.7	5.1	5.1	90.7
Average snowy days (≥ 0.1 in)	4.3	4.0	2.0	0.6	0.0	0.0	0.0	0.0	0.0	0.3	1.7	3.6	16.5
Source: NOAA

== Attractions ==
The swing in the city park at 5th and Jefferson Streets is claimed to be the world's largest porch swing, long enough to fit 24 adults.

== Notable people ==
- Ken Darby, composer, lyricist, and conductor
- H. H. Kemper, Saskatchewan politician
- Greg Lee, television and stage actor
- Elmo Roper, pollster
- Jeffery Kripal, scholar

== See also ==
- List of municipalities in Nebraska
- National Register of Historic Places listings in Thayer County, Nebraska
