= Ethel Edwards =

American painter

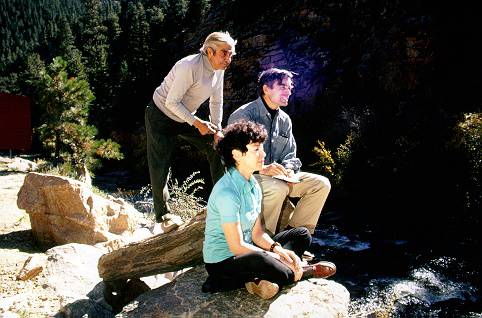
- Artist Ethel Edwards with Xavier Gonzalez (L) and Chris Karras on the Colorado-Big Thompson Project, Colorado
- Born: 1914; Opelousas, Louisiana
- Died: January 24, 1999 (aged 83–84)

Ethel Edwards (1914– 1999) was an American painter, collage artist, illustrator, and muralist. She is known for her New Deal murals.

== Education ==
In 1933 she entered Newcomb College in New Orleans where she studied with Xavier Gonzalez. She married Gonzales in 1936 in Alpine, Texas, where he had conducted a summer art colony for several years.

== Career ==
They continued the summer art school until 1936 when Xavier took a leave of absence to live in France. Returning to Alpine with her husband in late 1937, Edwards won a national competition to paint a post office mural, Afternoon on a Texas Ranch, for Lampasas, Texas. In 1942 she completed a mural, Life on the Lake for the post office in Lake Providence, Louisiana.

During the World War II war years Edwards and Gonzales moved to New York City where they both taught at the Art Students League and she did fashion illustrations for Town & Country and Fortune magazines. From 1942 to 1949, the couple lived in New York City and spent summers at Wellfleet, Massachusetts on Cape Cod. Edwards later taught at the Art Students League of New York and the Truro Center of the Arts. In 1957 Edwards was the recipient of a MacDowell fellowship.

Edwards died on January 24, 1999, in New York City.

The Xavier Gonzalez and Ethel Edwards Travel Grant given by The Art Students League of New York was first awarded in 2002; it provides stipends to artists for travel in Spain.

== Works ==
Her papers can be found in the Archives of American Art in the Smithsonian Institution in Washington D.C.

Her paintings are in the collections of the Smithsonian American Art Museum and the United States Bureau of Reclamation.
