= Peppino Mangravite =

American painter

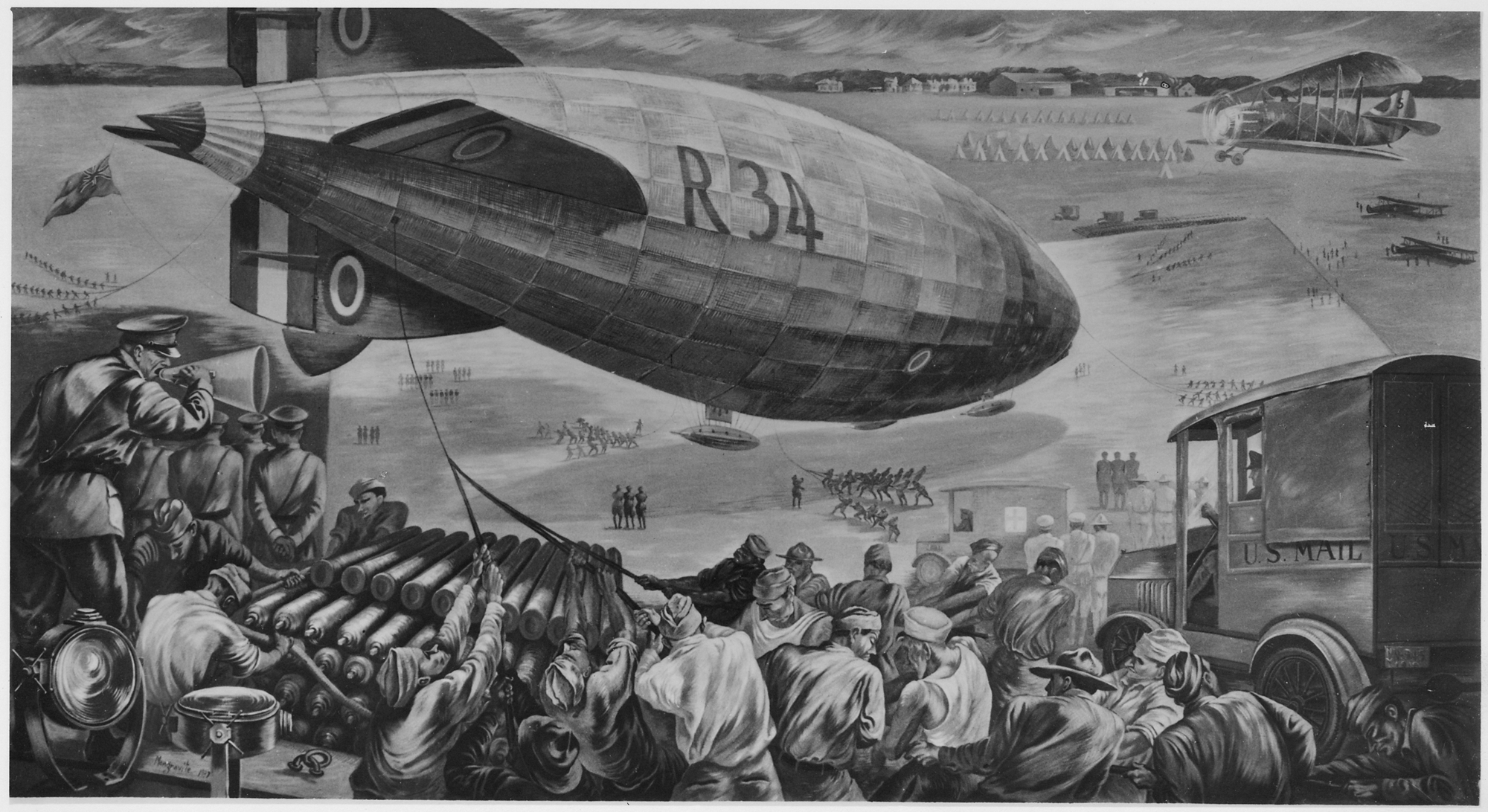
"Arrival of British dirigible R.34 with the first air mail in 1919"; Peppino Mangravite, 1937

Peppino Mangravite (June 28, 1896 – April 26, 1978) was an Italian-American Modernist painter.

Peppino Gino Mangravite was born in 1896, on Lipari, an island north of Sicily, where his father, a naval officer, was stationed. As a child he began a traditional Italian art education in Carrara. In 1914, at the age of eighteen, Peppino Gino Mangravite settled in New York City with his father. He had already completed six years of study at the Scuole Techiniche Belle Arti in his native Italy, where coursework included the study of anatomy and Renaissance fresco techniques. Upon arrival in New York, he enrolled at Cooper Union, and by 1917 was studying under Robert Henri at the Art Students League.

He received Guggenheim Fellowships in 1932 and 1935.

In 1962 he exhibited his work at a two man show with Kenneth Evatt at Lehigh University at the invitation of Professor Francis Quirk.

Mangravite was involved in New Deal art programs. He painted murals for the Department of Labor in Washington, D.C., and for post offices in Hempstead, New York and Atlantic City, New Jersey. In the 1950s he executed a mosaic mural for the main altar at the Shrine of St. Anthony in Boston, Massachusetts.

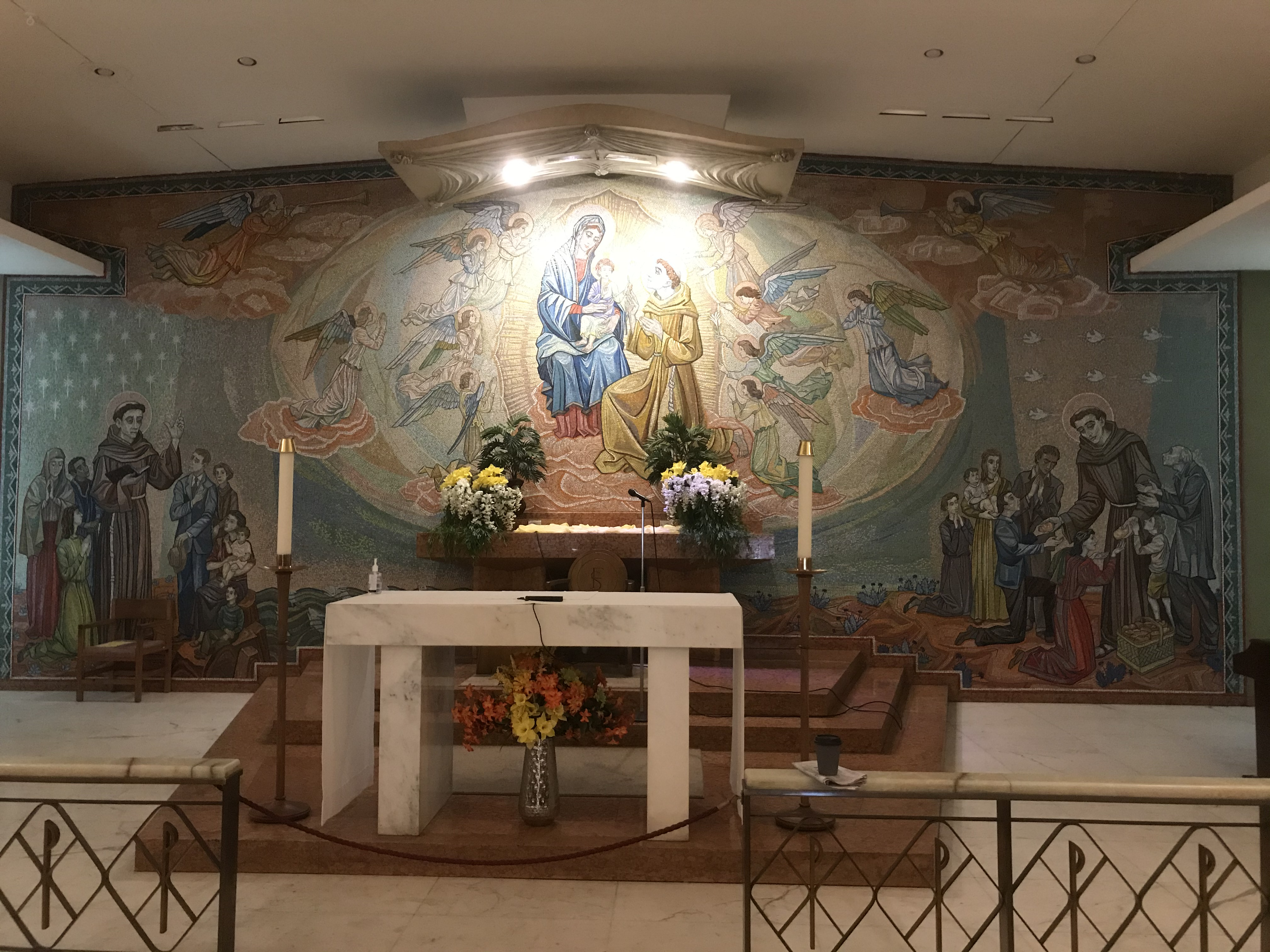
Altar Mosaic by Peppino Mangravite at St. Anthony's Shrine in Boston, Massachusetts

He was the Director of the Art Department at Sarah Lawrence College and a Professor of Painting at Columbia University.

== Collections ==
- Corcoran Gallery of Art
- Metropolitan Museum of Art
- Whitney Museum of American Art
- The Phillips Collection
- Art Institute of Chicago
- Pennsylvania Academy of Fine Arts
- Toledo Museum of Art
- Denver Art Museum
- California Palace of the Legion of Honor
- Cincinnati Art Museum
- Encyclopedia Britannica Collection
- U.S. State Department- Art in Embassies
