= National Register of Historic Places listings in Otero County, Colorado =

Location of Otero County in Colorado

This is a list of the National Register of Historic Places listings in Otero County, Colorado.

This is intended to be a complete list of the properties and districts on the National Register of Historic Places in Otero County, Colorado, United States. The locations of National Register properties and districts for which the latitude and longitude coordinates are included below, may be seen in a map.

There are 22 properties and districts listed on the National Register in the county, including 1 National Historic Landmark.

This National Park Service list is complete through NPS recent listings posted August 28, 2026.

== Current listings ==
	Name on the Register	Image	Date listed	Location	City or town	Description
1	Adobe Stables, Arkansas Valley Fairgrounds	Adobe Stables, Arkansas Valley Fairgrounds	December 26, 2007 (#07001305)	800 N. 9th St. 38°03′35″N 103°42′57″W	Rocky Ford	
2	Art Building	Art Building	September 27, 1996 (#96001027)	Arkansas Valley Fairgrounds, near the junction of Main St. and U.S. Highway 50; 38°03′31″N 103°43′07″W	Rocky Ford	
3	Bent's Old Fort National Historic Site	Bent's Old Fort National Historic Site	October 15, 1966 (#66000254)	State Highway 194; 38°02′37″N 103°25′53″W	La Junta	
4	Carnegie Public Library	Carnegie Public Library	November 7, 1995 (#95001247)	1005 Sycamore Ave. 38°02′59″N 103°43′09″W	Rocky Ford	
5	Dr. Frank Finney House	Dr. Frank Finney House	May 17, 1984 (#84000877)	608 Belleview Ave. 37°58′57″N 103°32′51″W	La Junta	
6	Wilson A. Hart House	Wilson A. Hart House	May 31, 1979 (#79000617)	802 Raton Ave. 37°58′51″N 103°32′31″W	La Junta	
7	La Junta City Park	La Junta City Park	April 24, 2007 (#07000343)	Bounded by Colorado and Park Aves. and 10th and 14th Sts. 37°58′38″N 103°32′39″W	La Junta	
8	Lincoln School	Lincoln School	September 13, 1978 (#78000874)	300 block of W. 3rd St. 37°59′10″N 103°32′53″W	La Junta	
9	Manzanola United Methodist Church (MUMC)	Manzanola United Methodist Church (MUMC)	November 13, 2024 (#100011069)	115 Park Street; 38°06′24″N 103°52′02″W	Manzanola	Gothic Revival-style church built in 1908 by its Methodist congregation, with Akron Plan Sunday school rooms. The church has served as an important community center, and spiritual home to some residents of The Dry, one of two all-Black homesteading communities in Colorado, which lay seven miles south of Manzanola.
10	North La Junta School	North La Junta School	June 25, 1992 (#92000809)	Junction of State Highways 109 and 194; 38°00′02″N 103°31′51″W	La Junta	
11	Rocky Ford Post Office	Rocky Ford Post Office	January 16, 2008 (#07001394)	401 N. 9th St. 38°03′19″N 103°43′13″W	Rocky Ford	
12	Eugene Rourke House	Eugene Rourke House	May 9, 1983 (#83001326)	619 Carson St. 37°58′56″N 103°32′53″W	La Junta	
13	San Juan Avenue Historic District	San Juan Avenue Historic District	August 27, 1980 (#80000918)	501–521 and 522 San Juan Ave. 37°59′00″N 103°32′45″W	La Junta	
14	Santa Fe Railway Manzanola Depot	Santa Fe Railway Manzanola Depot	April 28, 2004 (#04000363)	212 N. Grand Ave. 38°06′35″N 103°52′00″W	Manzanola	
15	Santa Fe Trail Mountain Route Trail Segments-Bloom Vicinity		February 23, 2016 (#16000025)	Address Restricted	Bloom vicinity	
16	Santa Fe Trail Mountain Route Trail Segments-Iron Springs Vicinity	Santa Fe Trail Mountain Route Trail Segments-Iron Springs Vicinity	August 28, 2017 (#100000682)	Address Restricted	Mindeman vicinity	
17	Santa Fe Trail Mountain Route Trail Segments-Timpas Vicinity		February 23, 2016 (#16000026)	Address Restricted	Timpas vicinity	
18	Daniel Sciumbato Grocery Store	Daniel Sciumbato Grocery Store	May 17, 1984 (#84000878)	706 2nd St. 37°59′12″N 103°33′06″W	La Junta	
19	Swink School	Swink School	March 28, 2025 (#100011578)	321 Columbia Ave. 38°00′49″N 103°37′43″W	Swink	
20	United Methodist Church of La Junta	United Methodist Church of La Junta	May 12, 2025 (#100011789)	601 San Juan Ave; 37°58′58″N 103°32′45″W	La Junta	
21	U.S. Post Office	U.S. Post Office	July 12, 1976 (#76000565)	4th and Colorado Ave. 37°59′07″N 103°32′36″W	La Junta	
22	Valley View-Hillcrest Cemetery	Valley View-Hillcrest Cemetery	July 29, 2024 (#100010592)	37980 County Road 20; 38°03′44″N 103°42′29″W	Rocky Ford	

== See also ==
- List of National Historic Landmarks in Colorado
- List of National Register of Historic Places in Colorado
- Bibliography of Colorado
- Geography of Colorado
- History of Colorado
- Index of Colorado-related articles
- List of Colorado-related lists
- Outline of Colorado
