= Walter Dubree =

American architect

Walter Dubree was an American architect from La Junta, Colorado. He designed several works which are listed on the National Register of Historic Places (NRHP).

Works include:

- Dr. Frank Finney House (1899), 608 Belleview Ave., La Junta, Colorado, NRHP-listed
- a high school in or near Rocky Ford (c.1908)
- Carnegie Public Library (1908), 1005 Sycamore Ave., Rocky Ford, Colorado, NRHP-listed
- Bent County High School (1913 or 1914), 1214 Ambassador Thompson Blvd., (with James Larson) Las Animas, Colorado, NRHP-listed
- North La Junta School (1914), at junction of CO 109 and CO 194, North La Junta, Colorado, NRHP-listed
