= Colorado State Highway 266 =

State highway in Colorado, United States

State Highway 266
- SH 266 highlighted in red

Route information
- Maintained by CDOT
- Length: 11.516 mi (18.533 km)

Major junctions
- West end: US 50 / SH 71 in Rocky Ford
- East end: SH 109 near Cheraw

Location
- Country: United States
- State: Colorado
- Counties: Otero

Highway system
- Colorado State Highway System; Interstate; US; State; Scenic
← SH 265	→ I-270

State Highway 266 (SH 266) is a state highway in the U.S. state of Colorado. SH 266's western terminus is at U.S. Route 50 (US 50) and SH 71 in Rocky Ford, and the eastern terminus is at SH 109 near Cheraw.

== Route description ==
SH 266 runs 11.5 miles (18.5 km), starting at a junction with US 50 in Rocky Ford. The highway goes east, crosses the Arkansas River and ends at a junction with SH 109 near Cheraw.

== Major intersections ==
The entire route is in Otero County.

Location	mi	km	Destinations	Notes
Rocky Ford	0.000	0.000	US 50 east / SH 71 south	Western terminus, western terminus of SH 71 concurrency; US 50 eastbound only
Rocky Ford	0.060	0.097	US 50 west / SH 71 north	Eastern terminus of SH 71 concurrency; US 50 westbound only
	11.516	18.533	SH 109 – Cheraw, La Junta	Eastern terminus
1.000 mi = 1.609 km; 1.000 km = 0.621 mi: Concurrency terminus
