= North La Junta School =

Historic school building in North La Junta, Colorado, United States

- U.S. National Register of Historic Places
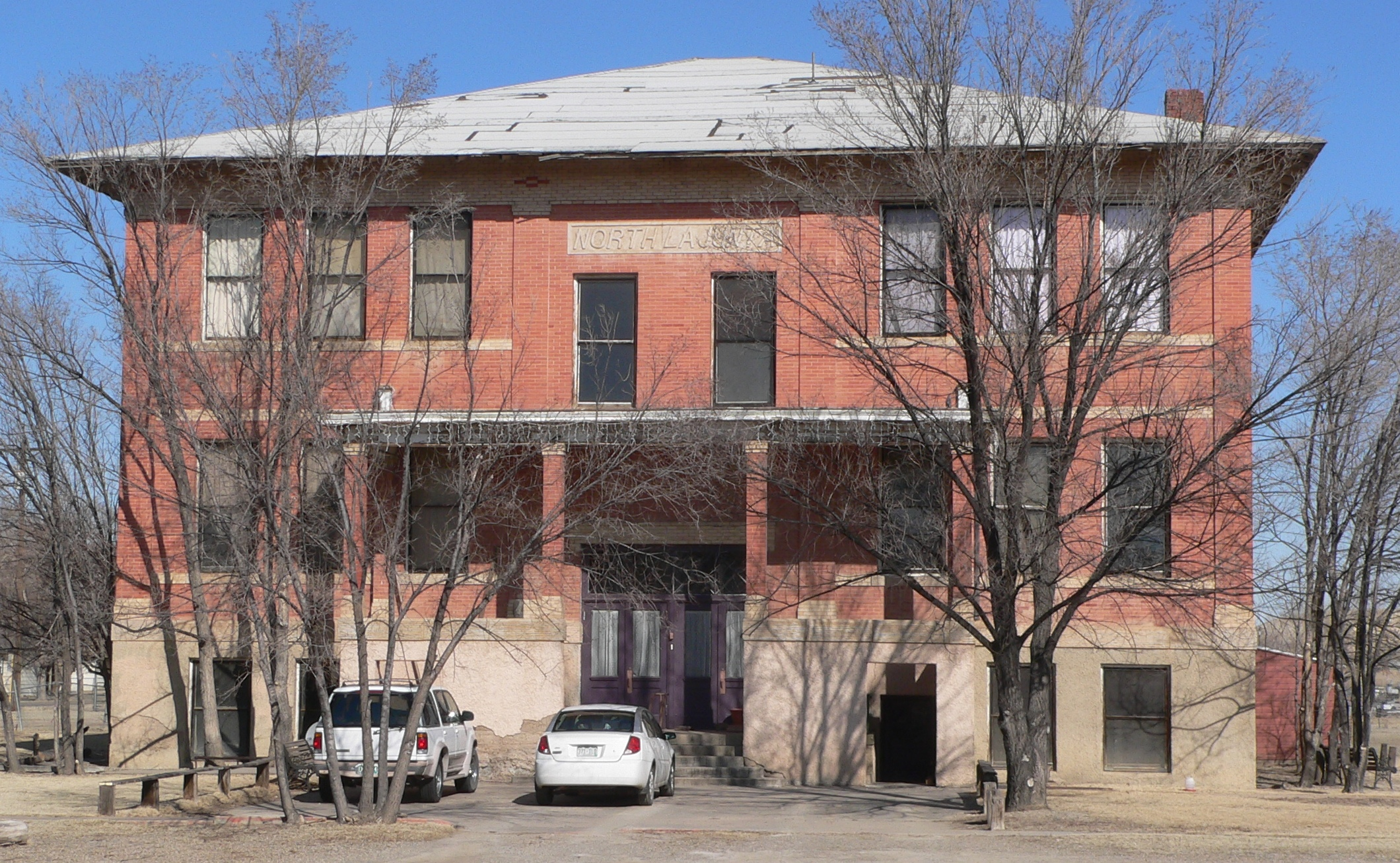

- Location within Colorado
- Location: Junction of CO 109 and CO 194, La Junta, Colorado
- Coordinates: 38°00′02″N 103°31′51″W
- Area: 2.3 acres (0.93 ha)
- Built: 1914
- Built by: J.A. Dahlgreen
- Architect: Walter Dubree
- Architectural style: Late 19th and Early 20th Century American Movements
- NRHP reference No.: 92000809
- Added to NRHP: June 25, 1992

The North La Junta School is a historic school building in North La Junta, Colorado, United States. It was built in 1914 and was listed on the National Register of Historic Places in 1992.

== Description ==
It is located in what was a small rural community of North La Junta across the Arkansas River from the larger town of La Junta in southeastern Colorado.

It was designed by architect Walter Dubree and was built by J.A. Dahlgreen. It is a two-story brick building about 64 by 68 feet (20 m × 21 m) in plan.

It has also been known as North School, and as North La Junta Elementary School.

Besides serving as the only school in North La Junta, it was important as a meeting hall/auditorium, as a community theatre, and otherwise as a community center.

It is located at junction of State Highway 109 (Main Street) and State Highway 194 (Trail Street) in North La Junta.

== See also ==
- National Register of Historic Places listings in Otero County, Colorado
