= List of United States post office buildings in Colorado =

United States post offices operate under the authority of the United States Post Office Department (1792–1971) or the United States Postal Service (since 1971). Historically, post offices were usually placed in a prominent location and many were architecturally distinctive, including notable buildings featuring Beaux-Arts, Art Deco, and Vernacular architecture. However, modern U.S. post offices were generally designed for functionality rather than architectural style.

Following is a list of United States post offices in Colorado. Notable post offices include individual buildings, whether still in service or not, which have architectural, historical, or community-related significance. Many of these are listed on the National Register of Historic Places (NRHP) or state and local historic registers.

Post office	City	Date built	Image	Architect	Notes	Ref.
Alamosa Post Office	Alamosa	1935		Louis A. Simon	(Note: Listed on the National Register of Historic Places.)	
Boulder Post Office	Boulder	1910		James Knox Taylor		
Cañon City Post Office and Federal Building	Cañon City	1931		James A. Wetmore		
United States Post Office and Federal Courthouse-Colorado Springs Main	Colorado Springs	1908–1910		James Know Taylor		
Delta Post Office and Federal Building	Delta	1938		Louis A. Simon		
Byron White United States Courthouse	Denver	1910–1916		Egerton Swartwout		
Englewood Post Office	Englewood	1937		Louis A. Simon		
Florence Post Office	Florence	1936		Louis A. Simon		
Fort Collins Post Office	Fort Collins	1911		James A. Wetmore		
United States Post Office-Fort Morgan Main	Fort Morgan	1917		James A. Wetmore		
Wildhack's Grocery Store-Post Office	Frisco	1883		Louis Wildhack		
U.S. Post Office (La Junta, Colorado)	La Junta	1915		Oscar Wenderoth		
Las Animas Post Office	Las Animas	1937– 1938		Louis A. Simon		
United States Post Office-Lamar Main	Lamar	1936		Walter DeMordaunt		
United States Post Office-Manitou Springs Main	Manitou Springs	1940		Louis A. Simon		
United States Post Office and Federal Building-Monte Vista Main	Monte Vista	1933		James A. Wetmore		
United States Post Office-Montrose Main	Montrose	1931		James A. Wetmore		
Fort Vasquez	Platteville	1835				
United States Post Office	Rifle	1940		Louis A. Simon		
Sterling Main Post Office, Federal Building, and Federal Courthouse	Sterling	1930		James A. Wetmore		
United States Post Office-Trinidad Main	Trinidad	1920		James Knox Taylor		
Zapata Ranch Headquarters	Mosca	c. 1870		unknown		
