= Colorado State Highway 194 =

State highway in Colorado, United States

State Highway 194
- SH 194 highlighted in red

Route information
- Maintained by CDOT
- Length: 19.8 mi (31.9 km)

Major junctions
- West end: SH 109 at La Junta
- Bent's Old Fort National Historic Site
- East end: US 50 near Las Animas

Location
- Country: United States
- State: Colorado
- Counties: Otero, Bent

Highway system
- Colorado State Highway System; Interstate; US; State; Scenic
← SH 187	→ SH 196

State Highway 194 (SH 194) is a 19.8 mi (31.9 km) long state highway in southeastern Colorado. SH 194's western terminus is at SH 109 in La Junta, and the eastern terminus is at U.S. Route 50 (US 50) near Las Animas.

== Route description ==
SH 194 begins at its western end at a junction with SH 109 in the city of La Junta. SH 194 travels eastward from there closely paralleling US 50 for its entire length before meeting that same route at a junction just north of Las Animas; this junction with US 50 marks the eastern end of SH 194. Roughly four miles east of La Junta, SH 194 travels past Bent's Old Fort National Historic Site, a reconstructed 19th century trading post located on the south side of the road.

== History ==
The route was established in 1939 and was entirely paved by 1957. The trumpet interchange at US 50 was constructed in 1972.

== Major intersections ==
County	Location	mi	km	Destinations	Notes
Otero	La Junta	0.000	0.000	SH 109 – La Junta, Cheraw	Western terminus
Bent		20.327	32.713	US 50 – Lamar, Las Animas	Eastern terminus
1.000 mi = 1.609 km; 1.000 km = 0.621 mi
