= La Junta Gardens, Colorado =

Census-designated-place in Otero County, CO, USA

- Census-designated place
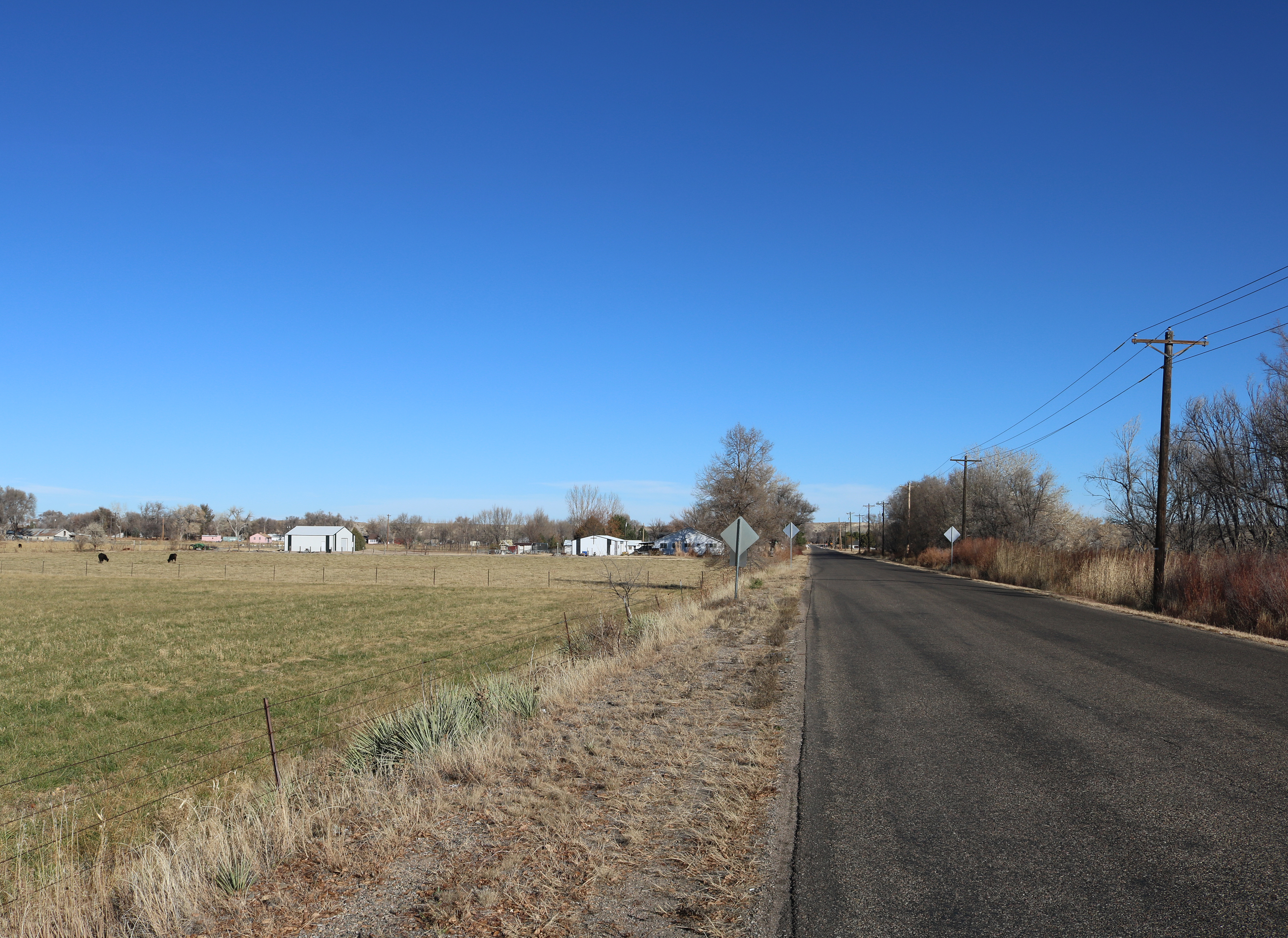
- Looking north along Jachim Avenue

- Location of the La Junta Gardens CDP in Otero County, Colorado
- Coordinates: 37°59′58″N 103°33′09″W
- Country: United States
- State: Colorado
- County: Otero County

Government
  - Type: unincorporated community

Area
  - Total: 0.533 sq mi (1.381 km^{2})
  - Land: 0.533 sq mi (1.381 km^{2})
  - Water: 0 sq mi (0.000 km^{2})
- Elevation: 4,065 ft (1,239 m)

Population (2020)
  - Total: 123
  - Density: 231/sq mi (89.1/km^{2})
- Time zone: UTC-7 (MST)
  - Summer (DST): UTC-6 (MDT)
- ZIP Code: La Junta 81050
- Area codes: 970
- GNIS feature ID: 2583257

La Junta Gardens is a census-designated place (CDP) in and governed by Otero County, Colorado, United States. The population of the La Junta Gardens CDP was 123 at the United States Census 2020. The La Junta post office (Zip Code 81050) serves the area.

== Geography ==
The La Junta Gardens CDP has an area of 341 acres (1.381 km^{2}), all land.

== Demographics ==
La Junta Gardens CDP, Colorado
Year	Pop.	±%
2010	153	—
2020	123	−19.6%
Source: United States Census Bureau

The United States Census Bureau initially defined the La Junta Gardens CDP for the United States Census 2010.

== See also ==
- List of census-designated places in Colorado
