= Colorado State Highway 109 =

State highway in Colorado, United States

State Highway 109
- SH 109 highlighted in red

Route information
- Maintained by CDOT
- Length: 65.327 mi (105.134 km)

Major junctions
- South end: US 160 near Kim
- US 50 in La Junta
- North end: Grand Avenue in Cheraw

Location
- Country: United States
- State: Colorado
- Counties: Las Animas, Bent, Otero

Highway system
- Colorado State Highway System; Interstate; US; State; Scenic
| ← SH 105 | → SH 110 |

State Highway 109 (SH 109) is a 65.327 mi (105.134 km) long state highway in southeastern Colorado. SH 109's southern terminus is at U.S. Route 160 (US 160) north of Kim, and the northern terminus a continuation north as Grand Avenue in Cheraw.

== Route description ==
The road begins in the south at its junction with US 160 roughly two miles north of Kim. From there the road proceeds northward for 55 miles (89 km) through remote, sparsely populated land, including a section of Comanche National Grassland, before reaching La Junta, the first of only two towns along the route's length. At La Junta, SH 109 intersects US 50 indirectly via SH 109 Spur (3rd Street). After crossing over US 50, the road continues northward, passing the La Junta Municipal Airport, to the small town of Cheraw where the road officially ends by becoming a city street called Grand Avenue.

== History ==
The route was established in the 1920s, when it began at Karval and headed eastward to Genoa. Several new sections including spurs and extensions were added in 1939. The route was paved in several segments by 1946. In 1954, most of the route was deleted, leaving only a segment from La Junta to Cheraw. The terminus was corrected by 1983. The entire route was paved by 1965.

== Major intersections ==
| County | Location | mi | km | Destinations | Notes |
|---|---|---|---|---|---|
| Las Animas | | 0.000 | 0.000 | US 160 – Springfield, Kim, Trinidad | Southern terminus |
| Bent | No major junctions | | | | |
| Otero | La Junta | 56.010 | 90.139 | SH 109 Spur (3rd Street); To US 50 – Las Animas, Lamar, Rocky Ford, Pueblo | |
| Otero | | 57.435 | 92.433 | SH 194 east – Bents Fort | Western terminus of SH 194 |
| Otero | | 63.255 | 101.799 | SH 266 west – Rocky Ford | Eastern terminus of SH 266 |
| Otero | Cheraw | 65.327 | 105.134 | 4th Street | Northern terminus |
| Otero | Cheraw | 65.327 | 105.134 | Grand Avenue | Continuation past 4th Street |
1.000 mi = 1.609 km; 1.000 km = 0.621 mi

== Related route ==
State Highway 109 Spur
- Location: La Junta
- Length: 0.2 mi (320 m)

SH 109 has a spur route in La Junta that spans for about 0.2 miles. It runs down on Bradish Avenue from US 50 and then heads east on 3rd street, then terminating at SH 109 (Adams Avenue)
