= Carnegie Public Library (Rocky Ford, Colorado) =

- U.S. National Register of Historic Places
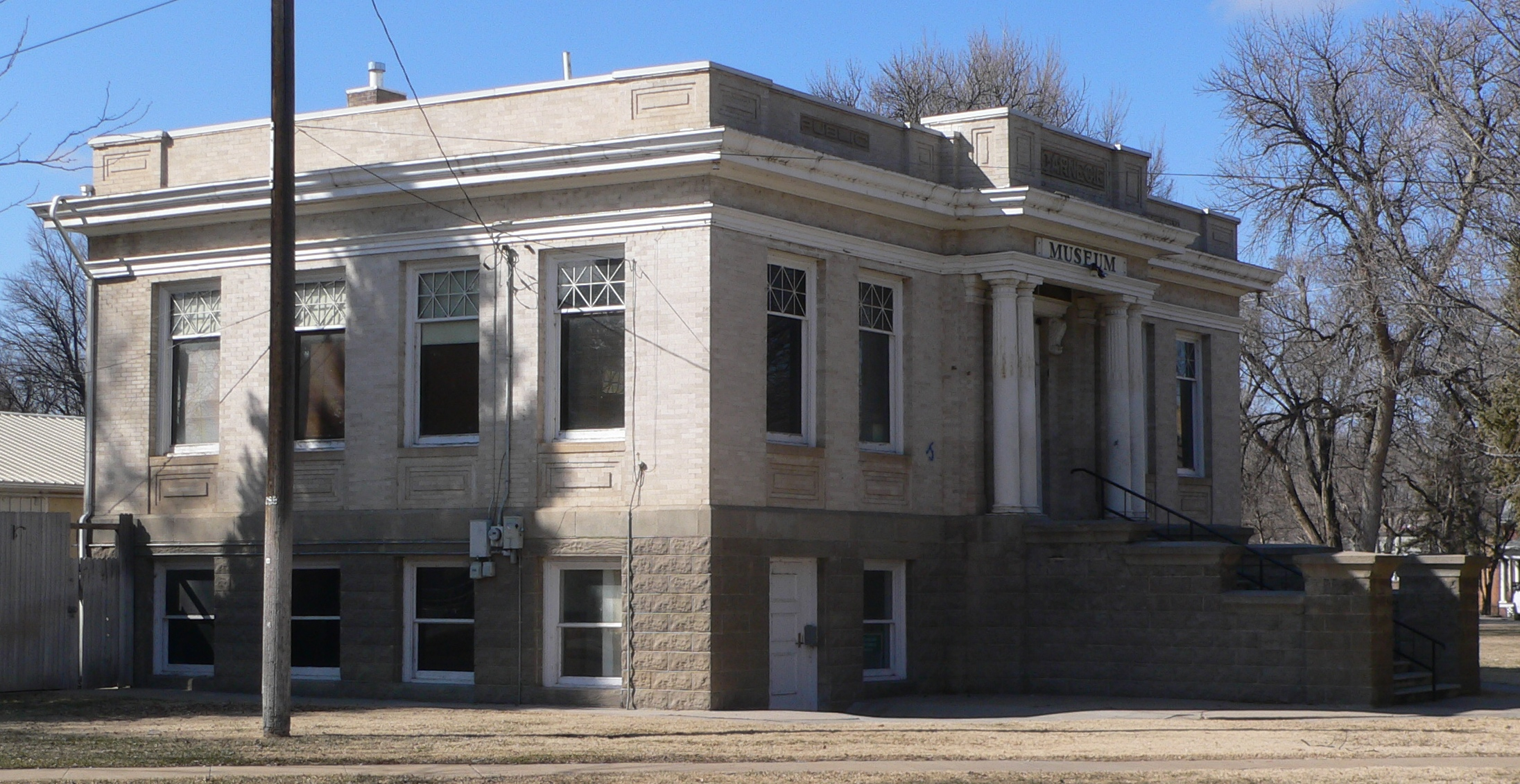

- Location within Colorado
- Location: 1005 Sycamore Ave., Rocky Ford, Colorado
- Coordinates: 38°02′59″N 103°43′09″W
- Area: 1.2 acres (0.49 ha)
- Built: 1908
- Architect: Walter Dubree
- Architectural style: Classical Revival
- NRHP reference No.: 95001247
- Added to NRHP: November 7, 1995

The Carnegie Public Library in Rocky Ford, Colorado is a Carnegie library built in 1908. It was listed on the National Register of Historic Places in 1995.

It was designed by La Junta, Colorado architect Walter Dubree in Classical Revival style. It was the first building in Rocky Ford of that style.

== See also ==
- Carnegie Public Library, located in Huntington, West Virginia
