= Colorado State Highway 10 =

State highway in Colorado, United States

State Highway 10
- SH 10 highlighted in red

Route information
- Maintained by CDOT
- Length: 71.968 mi (115.821 km)

Major junctions
- West end: I-25 / US 160 in Walsenburg
- East end: US 50 in La Junta

Location
- Country: United States
- State: Colorado
- Counties: Huerfano, Las Animas, Pueblo, Otero

Highway system
- Colorado State Highway System; Interstate; US; State; Scenic
← SH 9	→ SH 11

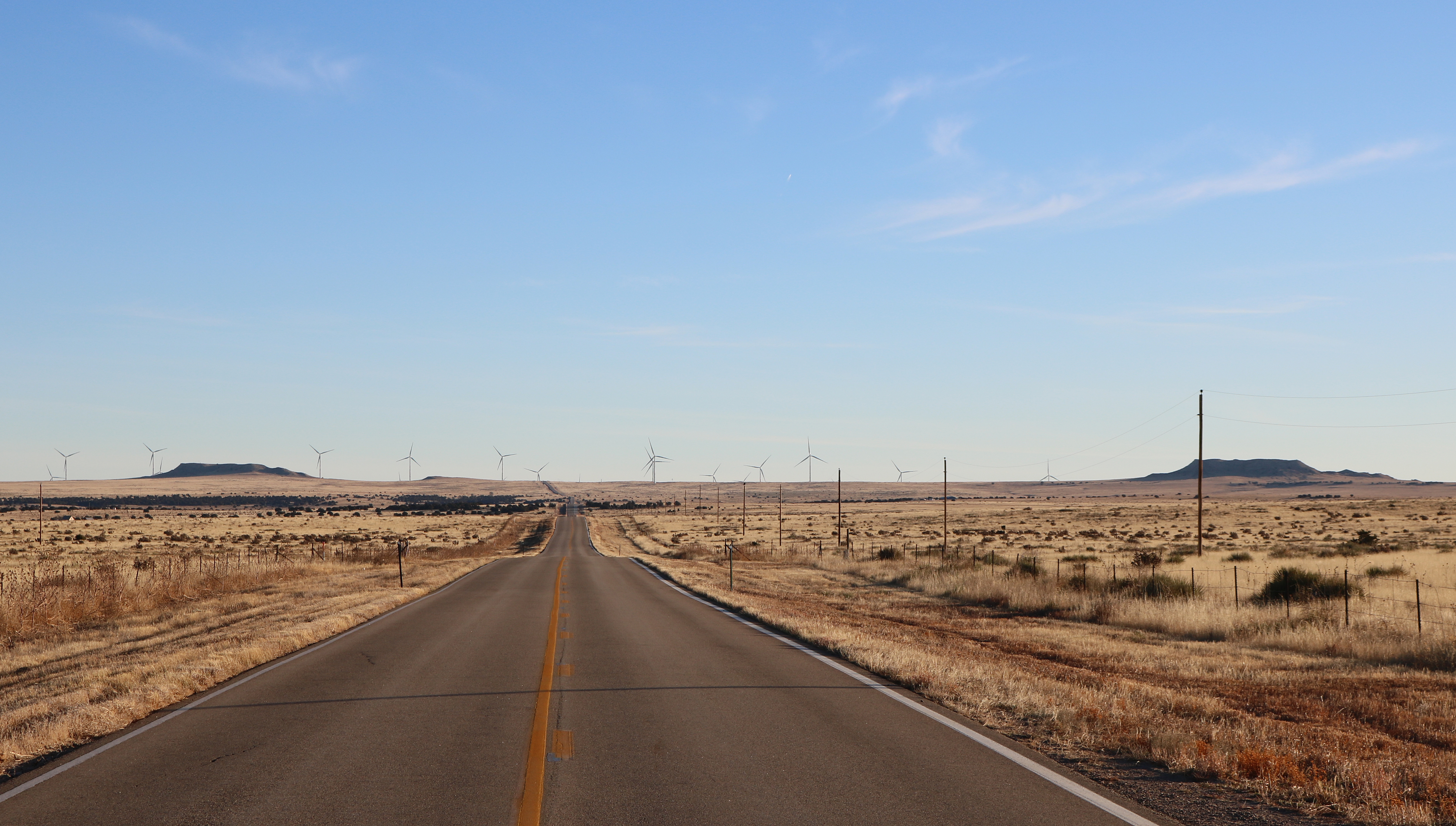
Looking northeast along SH 10 east of Walsenburg

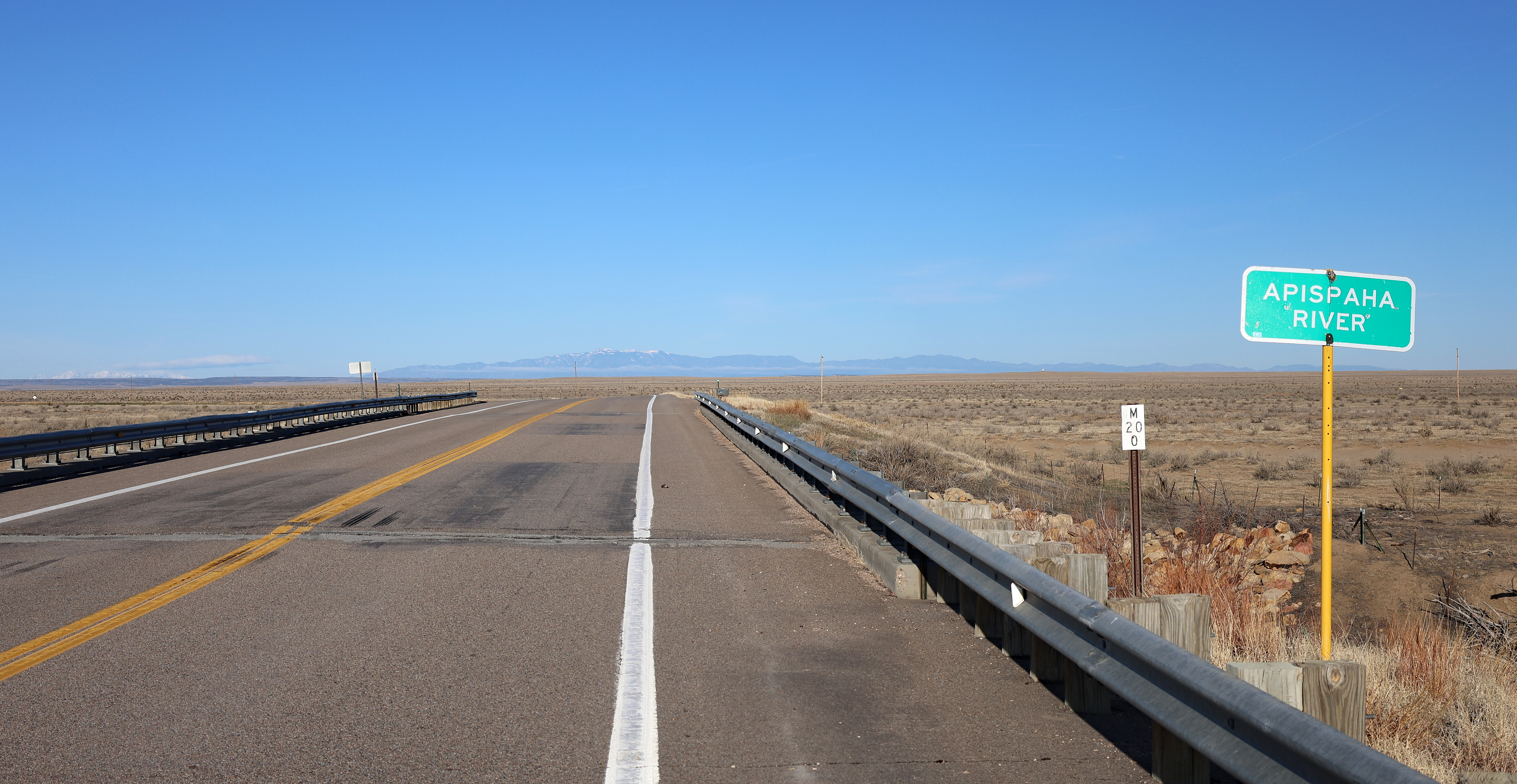
SH 10 bridging across the Apishapa River

State Highway 10 (SH 10) is a 71.968-mile-long (115.821 km) state highway in the US state of Colorado. SH 10's western terminus is at Interstate 25 (I-25) and U.S. Route 160 (US 160) in Walsenburg, and the eastern terminus is at US 50 in La Junta.

== Route description ==
SH 10 begins at an interchange with I-25 east of Walsenburg. It then heads east-northeast in a straight line, passing through Las Animas County and Pueblo County, before entering Otero County. The highway then turns due east, intersecting SH 71 in Hawley, before terminating at US 50 in La Junta.

== History ==
The route was established in the 1920s, when it began at the Utah state line near Dove Creek and went east to Walsenburg on today's Interstate 25. By 1936, a section was added pushing SH 10's terminus east to La Junta. By 1938, the route was corrected in a more straight line and most of the route was paved. The entire route was paved by 1960. The entire section from the Utah border to Walsenburg, the original alignment of the route, was relinquished in 1968.

== Major intersections ==
County	Location	mi	km	Destinations	Notes
Huerfano	Walsenburg	0.000	0.000	US 160 west – Walsenburg	Continuation west from western terminus
Huerfano	Walsenburg	0.000	0.000	I-25 north – Pueblo I-25 south / US 160 east – Trinidad	Western terminus; I-25 exit 50
Las Animas	No major junctions				
Pueblo	No major junctions				
Otero	Hawley	62.731	100.956	SH 71 south to US 350 – Trinidad	Western end of SH 71 concurrency
Otero	Hawley	63.231	101.760	SH 71 north – Rocky Ford	Eastern end of SH 71 concurrency
Otero	La Junta	71.968	115.821	US 50 – Pueblo, Lamar	Eastern terminus
1.000 mi = 1.609 km; 1.000 km = 0.621 mi: Concurrency terminus
