= Art Building =

Art Building may refer to:

- Art Building (Rocky Ford, Colorado)
- Art Building (Willamette University), Salem, Oregon
- Art Building and Annex, Portland State University, Oregon
- Art Building (University of Texas at Austin)
