= Belle van Dorn Harbert =

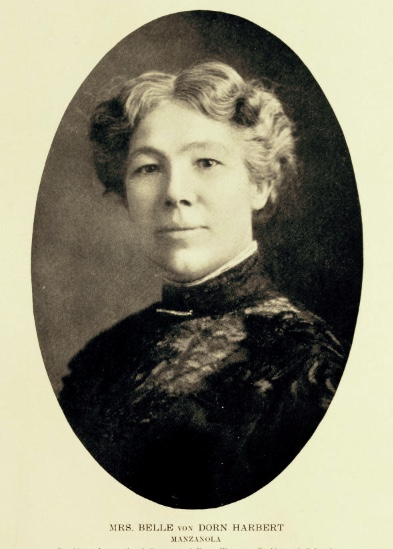
- Belle van Dorn Harbert, Representative Women of Colorado, 1914
- Born: Belle van Dorn; February 29, 1860; Des Moines, Iowa
- Died: after 1940
- Education: Drake University
- Occupation(s): Teacher, orchard farmer, founder of International Congress of Farm Women
- Spouse(s): Isaac Frazier (m. 1882, died); John Harbert (m. 1898)

Belle van Dorn Harbert (February 29, 1860 – after 1940) was an American educator and the president of the International Congress of Farm Women.

== Personal life ==
Belle van Dorn was born to William van Dorn and Mary Jane Miller in Des Moines, Iowa, where she was educated in public schools. In March 1882, she married Isaac Frazier, who died three months later. He was found dead in his barn with a gunshot wound to the head; it was undetermined it was a suicide or accident.

In 1898, she married John Harbert in Denver. John and Belle lived in Otero County, Colorado in 1940, where they operated a farm.

== Career ==
=== Educator and education ===
Harbert began teaching in Des Moines, Iowa when she was 15 years of age and by 22 she was a principal. She also attended Drake University. She came to Denver, where she continued teaching for ten years. Harbert graduated from the University of Denver in 1902. Through her education at both universities, she received Bachelor and Master of Arts degrees.

=== Fruit farmer ===
Using her savings, Harbert began a fruit orchard farm in the Arkansas Valley and it became one of the most productive and profitable farms in Colorado. She produced cherries and gooseberries. She was able to purchase labor-saving devices, but found than many other farm women did not have modern equipment. She began conducting lectures with exhibits about the modern kitchen and cooking demonstrations. Due to the interest she received, she established the International Congress of Farm Women.

=== International Congress of Farm Women ===
She was the president of the International Congress of Farm Women. Devoted to the study of rural sociology, she provided reports of rural home life to the Congress of Canada, the United States and Europe. She was decorated with the cross of the Order of Agriculture of Belgium in 1914. She planned for a group of model American farm houses at the Panama–Pacific International Exposition in San Francisco in 1915. The effort is funded by donations from farm women and others.
