= Sam Winningham =

American football player and coach (1926–2024)

Biographical details
- Born: October 11, 1926; Colby, Kansas, U.S.
- Died: April 19, 2024 (aged 97)

Playing career
- 1948–1949: Colorado
- Position: Quarterback

Coaching career (HC unless noted)
- 1950–1952: Bent County HS (CO)
- 1953–1959: Phoenix Union HS (AZ)
- 1962–1968: Valley State

Head coaching record
- Overall: 21–42–1 (college); 58–35–3 (high school)
- Bowls: 0–1

Sam Neal Winningham (October 11, 1926 – April 19, 2024) was an American football coach and player.

== Early life and education ==
Winningham was born in Colby, Kansas on October 11, 1926, the son of Alida (Bogan) and Neal Winningham. He played college football at the University of Colorado at Boulder, where he was a quarterback. Winningham earned a master's degree at Arizona State University, and a Ph.D. in physical education from the University of Southern California.

== Career ==
Winningham was the head football coach at Bent County High School in Las Animas, Colorado from 1950 to 1952 and Phoenix Union High School in Phoenix Arizona from 1953 to 1959, amassing a career high school football coaching record of 58–35–3. He served as the head football coach at San Fernando Valley State College — now known as California State University, Northridge — from 1962 to 1968, compiling a record of 21–42–1. He went on to become the chair of the physical education department at CSUN. In November 2017, aged 91, he attended a ceremony at CSUN dedicating a plaza in his honor.

== Personal life and death ==
His daughter is the actress Mare Winningham. Sam died on April 19, 2024, at the age of 97.

== Head coaching record ==
=== College ===
| Year | Team | Overall | Conference | Standing | Bowl/playoffs |
|---|---|---|---|---|---|
Valley State Matadors (California Collegiate Athletic Association) (1962–1968)
| 1962 | Valley State | 3–6 | 0–0 | NA | |
| 1963 | Valley State | 2–6 | 0–0 | NA | |
| 1964 | Valley State | 4–6 | 1–3 | T–4th | |
| 1965 | Valley State | 1–9 | 0–4 | 6th | |
| 1966 | Valley State | 2–7–1 | 0–5 | 6th | |
| 1967 | Valley State | 6–4 | 3–2 | T–2nd | L Pasadena |
| 1968 | Valley State | 5–4 | 1–3 | T–4th | |
| Plymouth State: | | 21–42–1 | 5–17 | | |
| Total: | | 21–42–1 | | | |
