= Tarantula Fest =

Annual festival in Colorado

Tarantula Fest is an annual festival held in La Junta, Colorado, to witness the mating season of native tarantulas.

The festival is held at the end of September, which is typically the high point of the tarantula mating season, which lasts from August through October. It attracts tourists and academics. It includes tours of surrounding grassland areas in the hour before dusk, which is typically the best time for viewing tarantulas during mating season. Hotels typically are booked up, and tours have waitlists.

Male Oklahoma brown/Colorado brown tarantulas emerge from their burrows at age 8-10, when they reach sexual maturity, and travel the area looking for mates.

The festival was created as a way to promote tarantula tourism in the area. It has been held since 2022.
