= Dr. Frank Finney House =

Historic house in Colorado, United States

- U.S. National Register of Historic Places
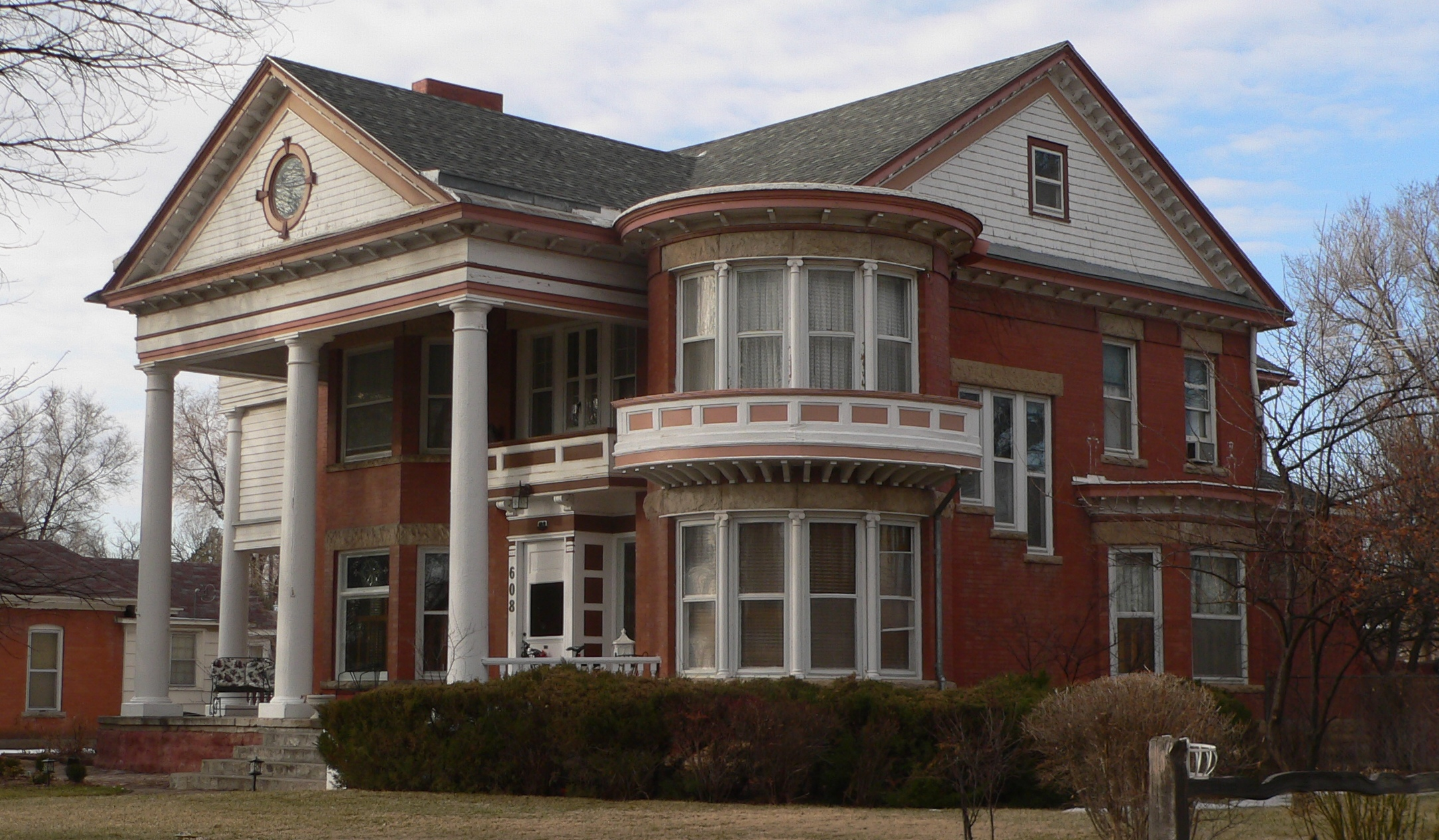

- Location within Colorado Location within the United States
- Location: 608 Belleview Ave., La Junta, Colorado
- Coordinates: 37°58′57″N 103°32′51″W
- Area: 0.4 acres (0.16 ha)
- Built: 1899
- Built by: Blankenship Brothers
- Architect: Walter Dubree
- Architectural style: Colonial Revival, Edwardian vernacular
- NRHP reference No.: 84000877
- Added to NRHP: May 17, 1984

The Dr. Frank Finney House, at 608 Belleview Ave. in La Junta, Colorado, was built in 1899. It was a work of architect Walter Dubree and is designed in a generally Edwardian vernacular style but with Colonial Revival details. Also known as the Hofmann-Collins House, it was listed on the National Register of Historic Places in 1984.

It was deemed significant as the largest historic house and the "most lavishly detailed" in La Junta. It was home of Dr. Frank Finney (d.1919) who was the Santa Fe Railroad's district surgeon and served as president of the Colorado Medical Society. The owners in 1984 were doctors Hofmann and Collins.
