= North La Junta, Colorado =

Census-designated place in Otero County, CO, USA

- Census-designated place
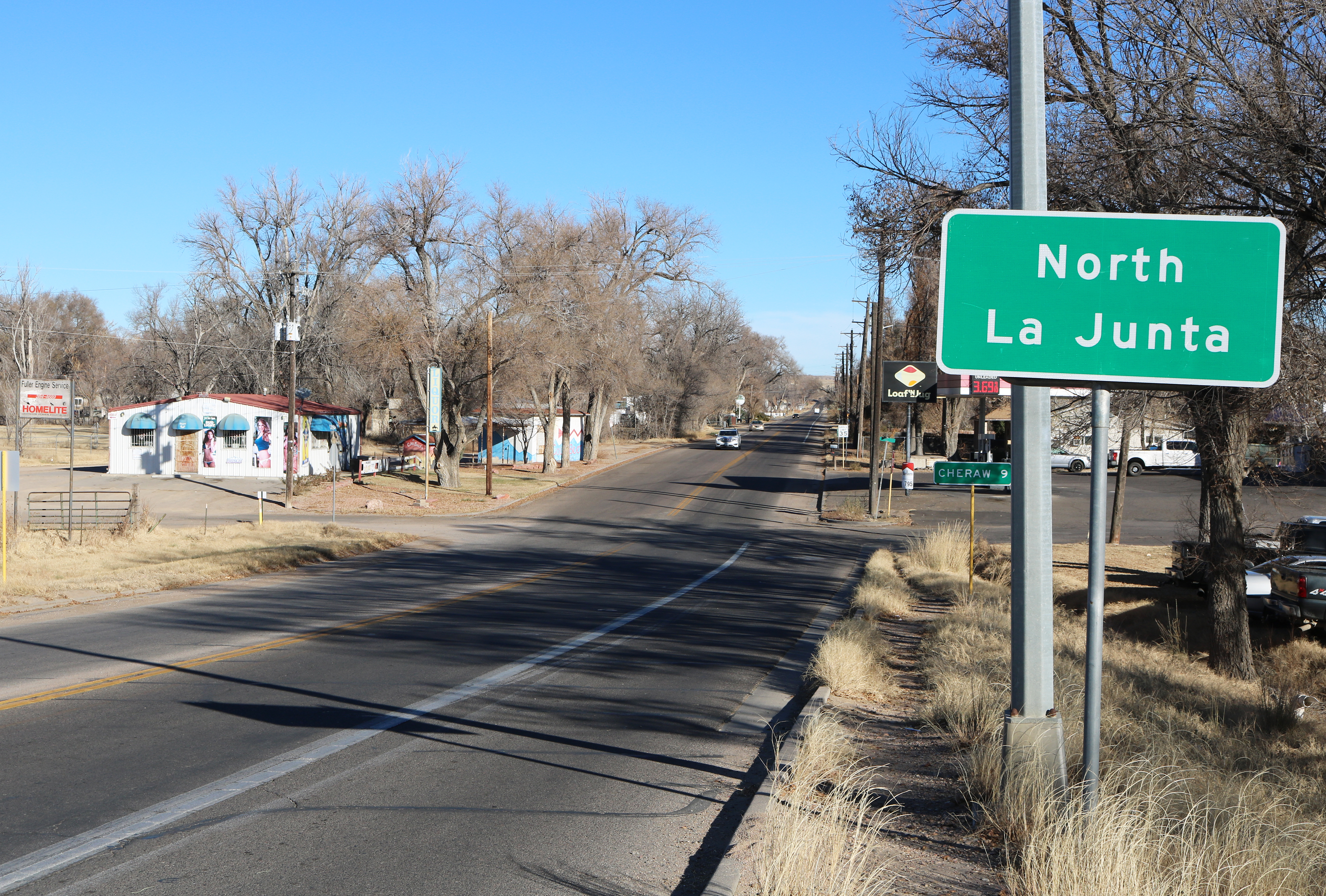
- Entering from the south

- Location of the North La Junta CDP in Otero County, Colorado
- Coordinates: 37°00′04″N 103°31′25″W
- Country: United States
- State: Colorado
- County: Otero County

Government
  - Type: Unincorporated community

Area
  - Total: 1.391 sq mi (3.602 km^{2})
  - Land: 1.360 sq mi (3.523 km^{2})
  - Water: 0.031 sq mi (0.079 km^{2})
- Elevation: 4,045 ft (1,233 m)

Population (2020)
  - Total: 482
  - Density: 354/sq mi (137/km^{2})
- Time zone: UTC-7 (MST)
  - Summer (DST): UTC-6 (MDT)
- ZIP Code: La Junta 81050
- Area codes: 970
- GNIS feature: 2583273

North La Junta is a census-designated place (CDP) in Otero County, Colorado, United States. The population of the North La Junta CDP was 482 at the United States Census 2020. The La Junta post office Zip Code 81050 serves the area.

== History ==
The North La Junta School is listed on the National Register of Historic Places.

== Geography ==
North La Junta is located just across the Arkansas River from the larger City of La Junta.

The North La Junta CDP has an area of 890 acres (3.602 km^{2}), including 20 acres (0.079 km^{2}) of water.

== Demographics ==
North La Junta CDP, Colorado
Year	Pop.	±%
2010	512	—
2020	482	−5.9%
Source: United States Census Bureau

The United States Census Bureau initially defined the North La Junta CDP for the United States Census 2010.

== See also ==
- List of census-designated places in Colorado
