= Daniel Sciumbato Grocery Store =

- U.S. National Register of Historic Places
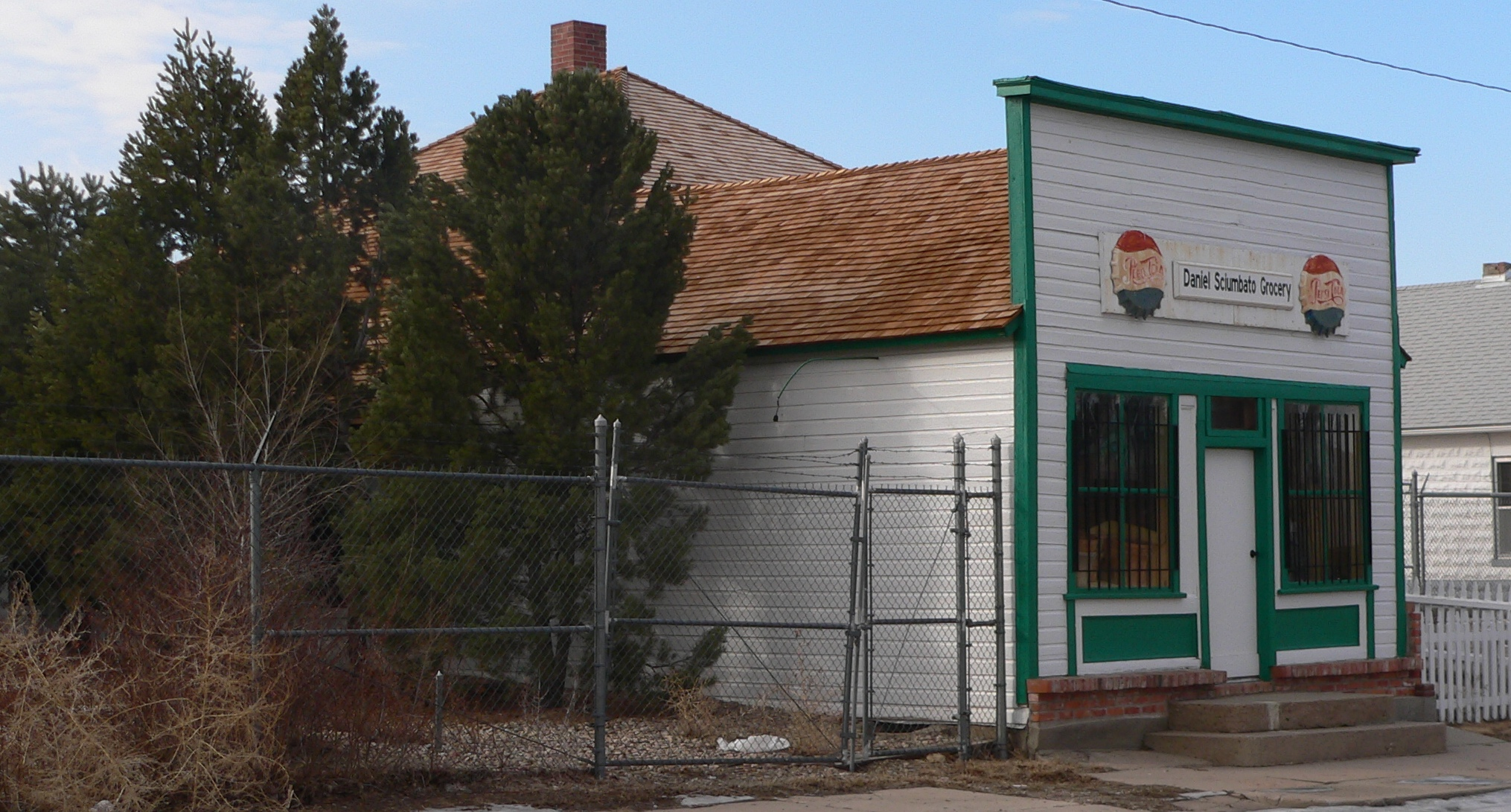

- Location within Colorado Location within the United States
- Location: 706 2nd St., La Junta, Colorado
- Coordinates: 37°59′12″N 103°33′06″W
- Area: 0.3 acres (0.12 ha)
- Built: 1908
- NRHP reference No.: 84000878
- Added to NRHP: May 17, 1984

The Daniel Sciumbato Grocery Store, at 706 2nd St. in La Junta, Colorado, was built in 1908. It was listed on the National Register of Historic Places in 1984.

The lot was purchased by Daniel Sciumbato in 1901, with a two-room adobe house in place. About 1908, added a false-fronted frame building to the front and opened a grocery store in that plus the east room of the adobe structure. A house adjacent to the west, and the west room of the adobe structure, became his family's residence. In about 1910 the house adjacent was moved elsewhere, and a brick house was built around the adobe structure.

The grocery store was operated by Sciumbato until his death in 1942; his son George then took over and the store continued in operation until 1974.
