= Eugene Rourke House =

Historical house in La Junta, CO

- U.S. National Register of Historic Places
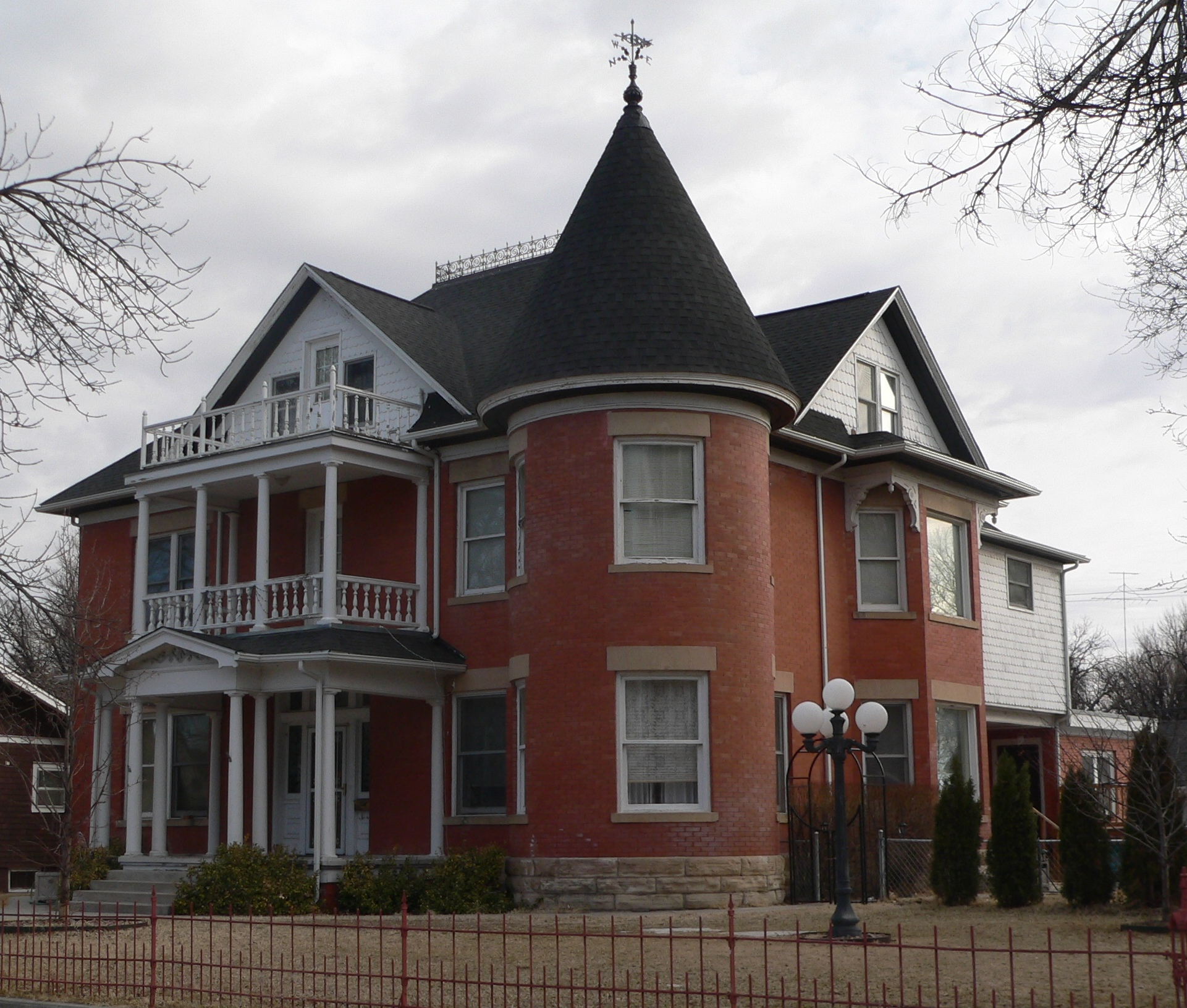
- Rourke house (La Junta, Colorado) from SW 1

- Location within Colorado Location within the United States
- Location: 619 Carson St. La Junta, Colorado
- Coordinates: 37°58′55.76″N 103°32′52.83″W
- Area: less than one acre
- Built: 1912
- Architectural style: Colonial Revival, Late Victorian
- NRHP reference No.: 83001326
- Added to NRHP: May 9, 1983

The Eugene Rourke House at 619 Carson St., in La Junta, Colorado, United States, was built in 1898. It was added to the National Register of Historic Places on May 9, 1983. The building has many interesting features including a turret, Colonial Revival portico, and iron cresting around the hipped roof. The home demonstrates the transition between Late-Victorian and Colonial Revival styles. It is a two-story brick structure on four corner lots.

Born in 1849, Eugene Rourke originally immigrated to Illinois in 1852 from Ireland, began work as a farmhand at the age of 9, and found his way to a mining camp at Black Hawk, Colorado in 1869. He eventually traveled to the Purgatoire River Valley in southeastern Colorado where he established his ranch. Eugene Rourke founded the Rouke Ranch, also known as the Wineglass Ranch, in 1871. The ranch is now a National Historic District. The property is located on what is now the Comanche National Grassland. In 1898, Rourke made the decision to move his family to La Junta so his ten children could attend public school. At this time, construction began on the Eugene Rourke House. Rourke became a prominent businessman in La Junta establishing a bank, theater, and apartment building.

Eugene Rourke died in 1918.
