= Wilson A. Hart House =

- U.S. National Register of Historic Places
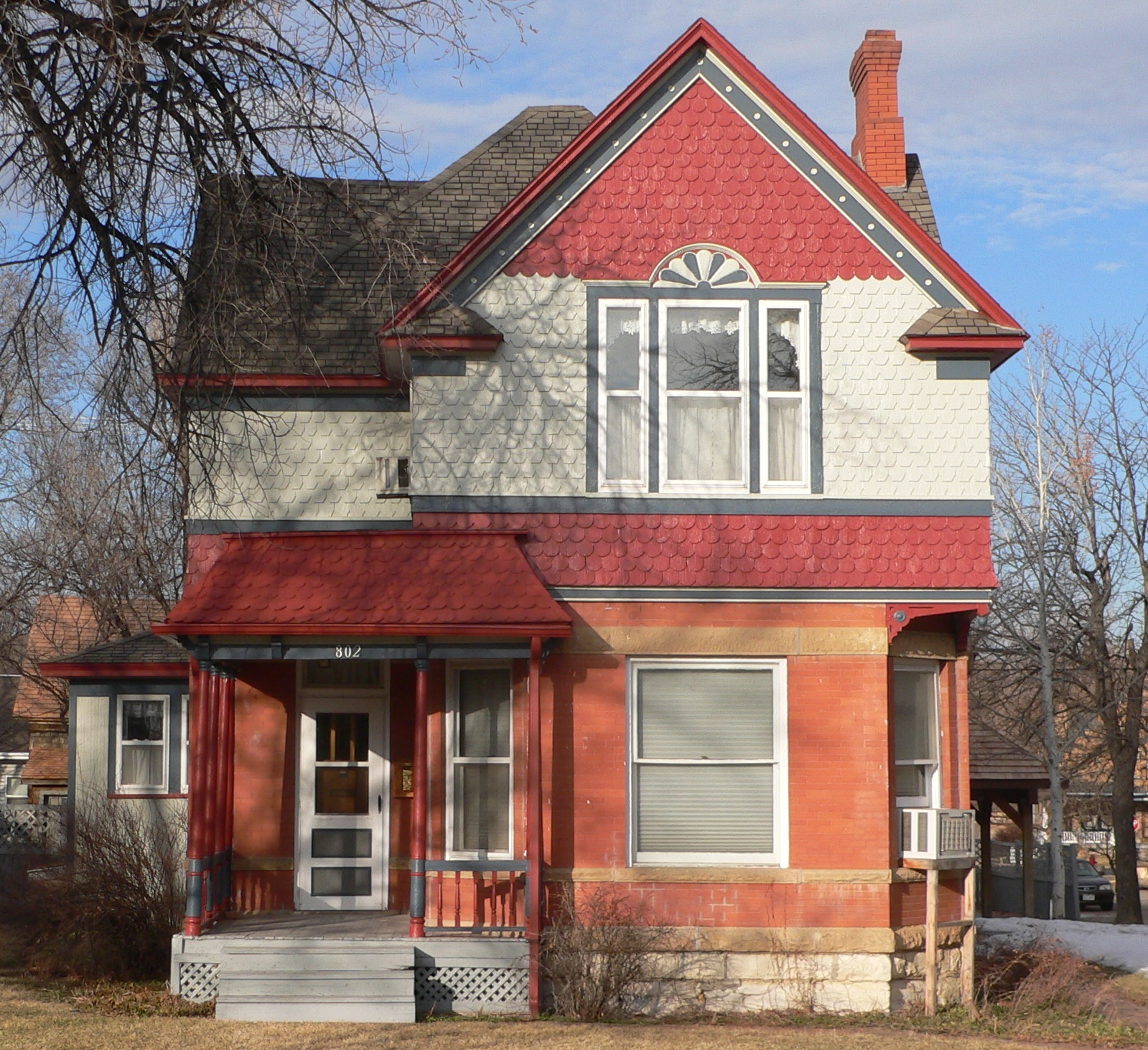

- Location within Colorado Location within the United States
- Location: 802 Raton Ave., La Junta, Colorado
- Coordinates: 37°58′51″N 103°32′31″W
- Area: 0.2 acres (0.081 ha)
- Built: 1898
- Built by: C. D. Amos
- Architect: George Burnett
- Architectural style: Late Victorian
- NRHP reference No.: 79000617
- Added to NRHP: May 31, 1979

The Wilson A. Hart House, at 802 Raton Ave. in La Junta, Colorado, was built in 1898. It was listed on the National Register of Historic Places in 1979.

It is a two-story house built with "stone, brick, and wood ... used in an interesting combination", built in eclectic Late Victorian styles.

It was designed and built in 1898 for Wilson A. Hart, a banker in La Junta, who "presented it as a wedding gift to his wife Mary J. Hart", who lived in the house until her death in 1942.
