= Marvin Cordova Jr. =

American boxer

Personal information
- Nickname: Much Too Much
- Nationality: American
- Born: Marvin Dale Cordova; January 17, 1985 (age 41) Rocky Ford, Colorado
- Height: 5 ft 10 in (180 cm)
- Weight: Light welterweight

Boxing career
- Reach: 72 in (183 cm)
- Stance: Orthodox

Boxing record
- Total fights: 26
- Wins: 23
- Win by KO: 12
- Losses: 2
- Draws: 1
- No contests: 0

Marvin Dale Cordova (born January 17, 1985) is an American professional boxer.

== Amateur career ==
In 2002 he won a bronze medal at the United States Under-19 championships at light welterweight and competed at the United States championships at lightweight. Then at 152 lbs he took a bronze medal at the 2003 Police Athletic League championships and was a Quarter-finalist at the 2004 US Western Olympic trials.

Cordova Jr. was introduced to the boxing arena at the age of six years and had 242 amateur fights before turning pro in 2004.

== Professional career ==
Cordova had a draw against top prospect Victor Ortiz and his only loss was to veteran Dennis Laurente.
