= U.S. Post Office (La Junta, Colorado) =

United States historic post office

- U.S. National Register of Historic Places
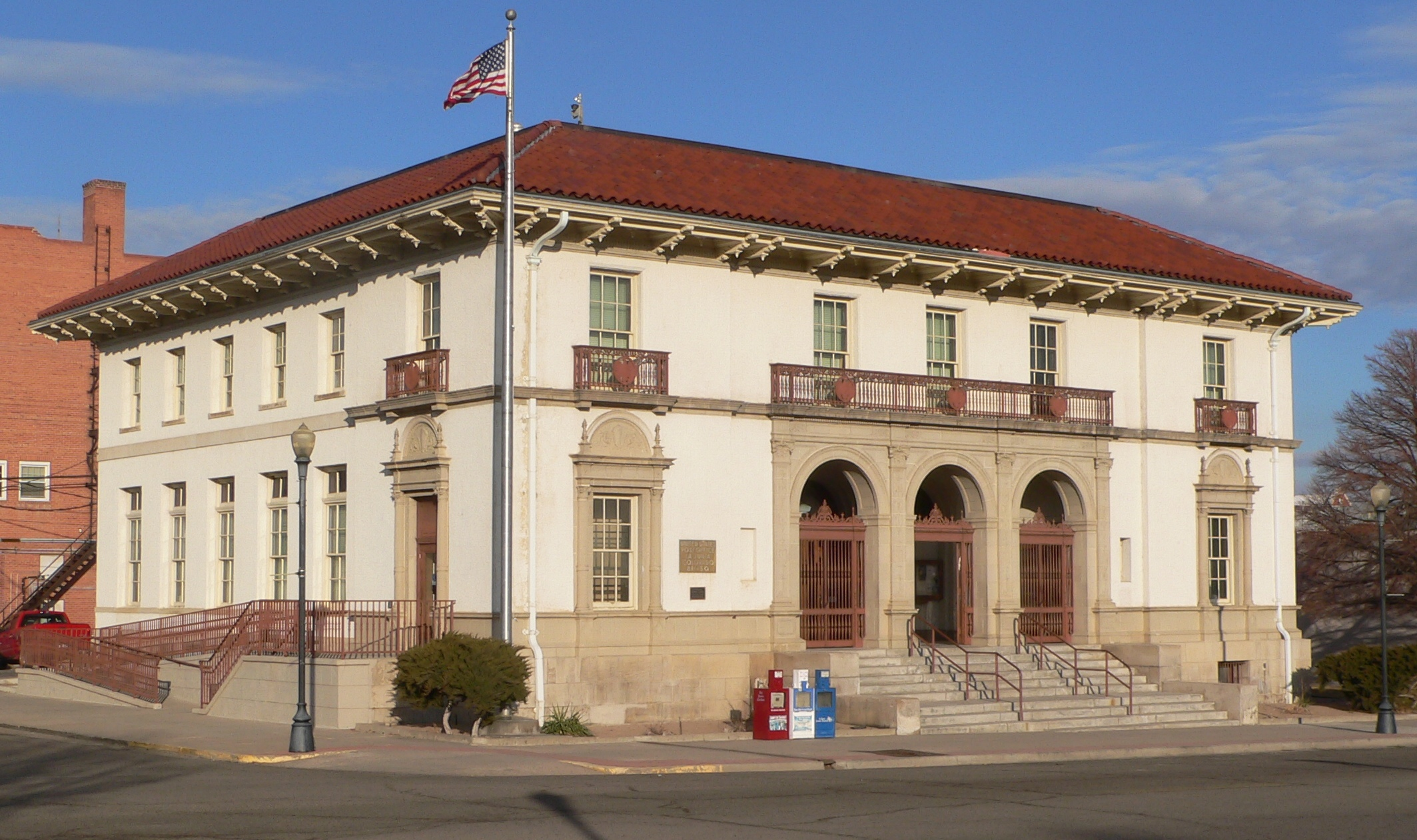

- Location within Colorado
- Location: 4th and Colorado Ave., La Junta, Colorado
- Coordinates: 37°59′07″N 103°32′36″W
- Area: 0.3 acres (0.12 ha)
- Built: 1915
- Architect: Oscar Wenderoth
- Architectural style: Mission/spanish Revival, Spanish Colonial
- NRHP reference No.: 76000565
- Added to NRHP: July 12, 1976

The U.S. Post Office in La Junta, Colorado, at 4th and Colorado Ave., was built in 1915. It was listed on the National Register of Historic Places in 1976.

Its design is credited to Oscar Wenderoth. It is a two-story building, built in "a modified Spanish Colonial style".
