= Bent County High School =

- U.S. National Register of Historic Places
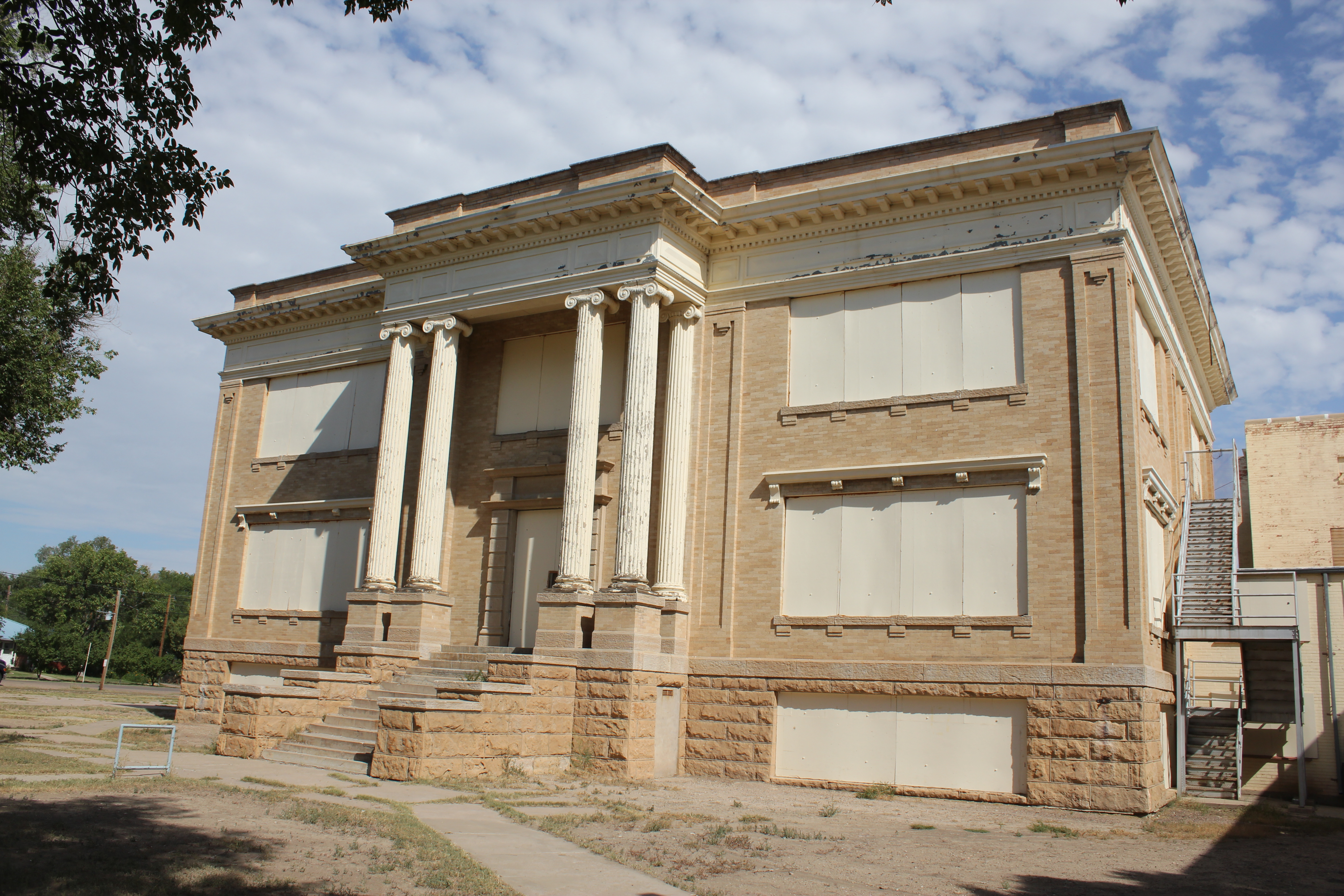
- The school in August, 2013

- Location within Colorado Location within the United States
- Location: 1214 Ambassador Thompson Blvd, Las Animas, Colorado
- Coordinates: 38°3′56″N 103°13′57″W
- Area: 1 acre (0.40 ha)
- Built: 1913 or 1914
- Architect: Walter Dubree; James Larson
- Architectural style: Classical Revival, Moderne
- MPS: New Deal Resources on Colorado's Eastern Plains MPS
- NRHP reference No.: 10000505
- Added to NRHP: July 30, 2010

The Bent County High School, in Bent County, Colorado at 1214 Ambassador Thompson Blvd in Las Animas, is a historic school that was built in 1913 or 1914. It has been deemed notable for association with former U.S. Ambassador Llewellyn Thompson (who served John F. Kennedy during the 1962 Cuban Missile Crisis), Ken Curtis (actor in CBS's Gunsmoke who graduated in 1935), and author James Michener’s wife, Mari (Sabusawa) Michener, all of whom attended the school, as well as for "its imposing, three-story, massive-columned architecture". It was designed by Swedish architect James Larson. The building was listed on the National Register of Historic Places (NRHP) in 2010.

The NRHP listing includes what has also been known as Las Animas Middle School and as Las Animas Junior High School. The property includes Classical Revival, and Moderne architecture. The listing includes two contributing buildings. Both Walter Dubree and James Larson are architects identified with the project.

The property was identified by Colorado Preservation, Inc., in 2004 as being one of the most endangered historic places in the state. As of October, 2009, the school building had then been empty for 10 years but was in good condition. Plans were then being discussed by the school board to renovate and re-use part of the property, the Works Progress Administration addition to the building, but in that plan the 1914 Classical Revival portion was slated for demolition. In 2013 the posted status for the site was "Alert".

The original classic revival-styled high school, built in 1914, was designed by La Junta architect Walter Dubree. It was expanded by an addition in 1939, funded by Works Progress Administration and Public Works Administration grants. The addition, with Art Moderne and Art Deco elements, was designed by Pueblo architects Walter DeMordaunt and John Gray.

It is shown as an NRHP-listed property by the Colorado Historical Society.

Las Animas is currently served by the Las Animas Senior High School, at 300 Grove Ave. in Las Animas, and other schools of the Las Animas School District.

== See also ==
- Columbian Elementary School, also noted endangered in 2004, subsequently demolished
