= Art Building (Rocky Ford, Colorado) =

- U.S. National Register of Historic Places
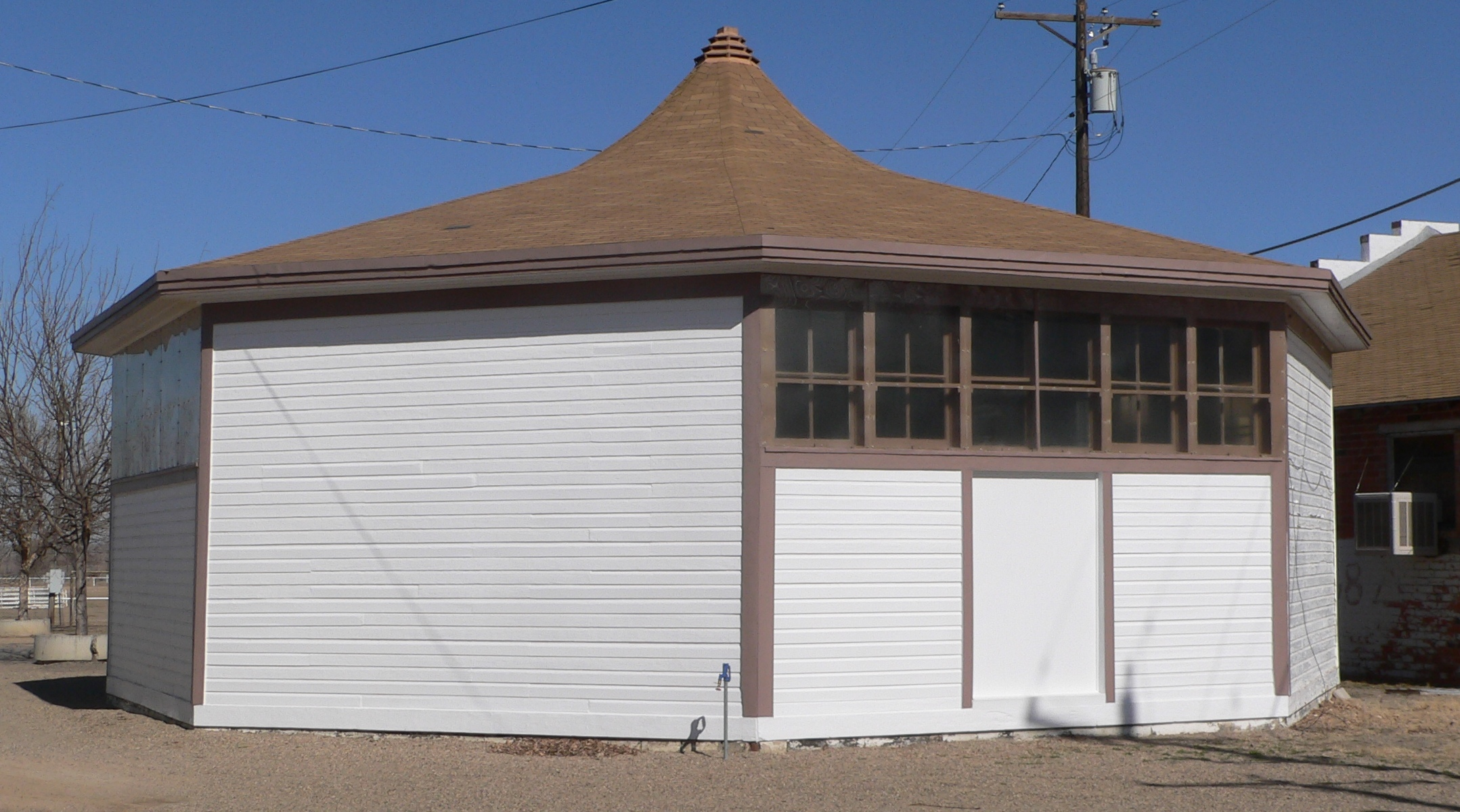

- Location within Colorado
- Location: Arkansas Valley Fairgrounds, near jct. of Main St. and US 50, Rocky Ford, Colorado
- Coordinates: 38°03′31″N 103°43′07″W
- Area: less than one acre
- Built: 1901
- Architectural style: octagon mode
- NRHP reference No.: 96001027
- Added to NRHP: September 27, 1996

The Art Building of the Arkansas Valley Fairgrounds in Rocky Ford, Colorado was built in 1901. It was listed on the National Register of Historic Places in 1996.

It is a one-story octagonal wood-frame building.
