= United States Post Office-Manitou Springs Main =

- US Post Office - Manitou Springs Main
- U.S. National Register of Historic Places
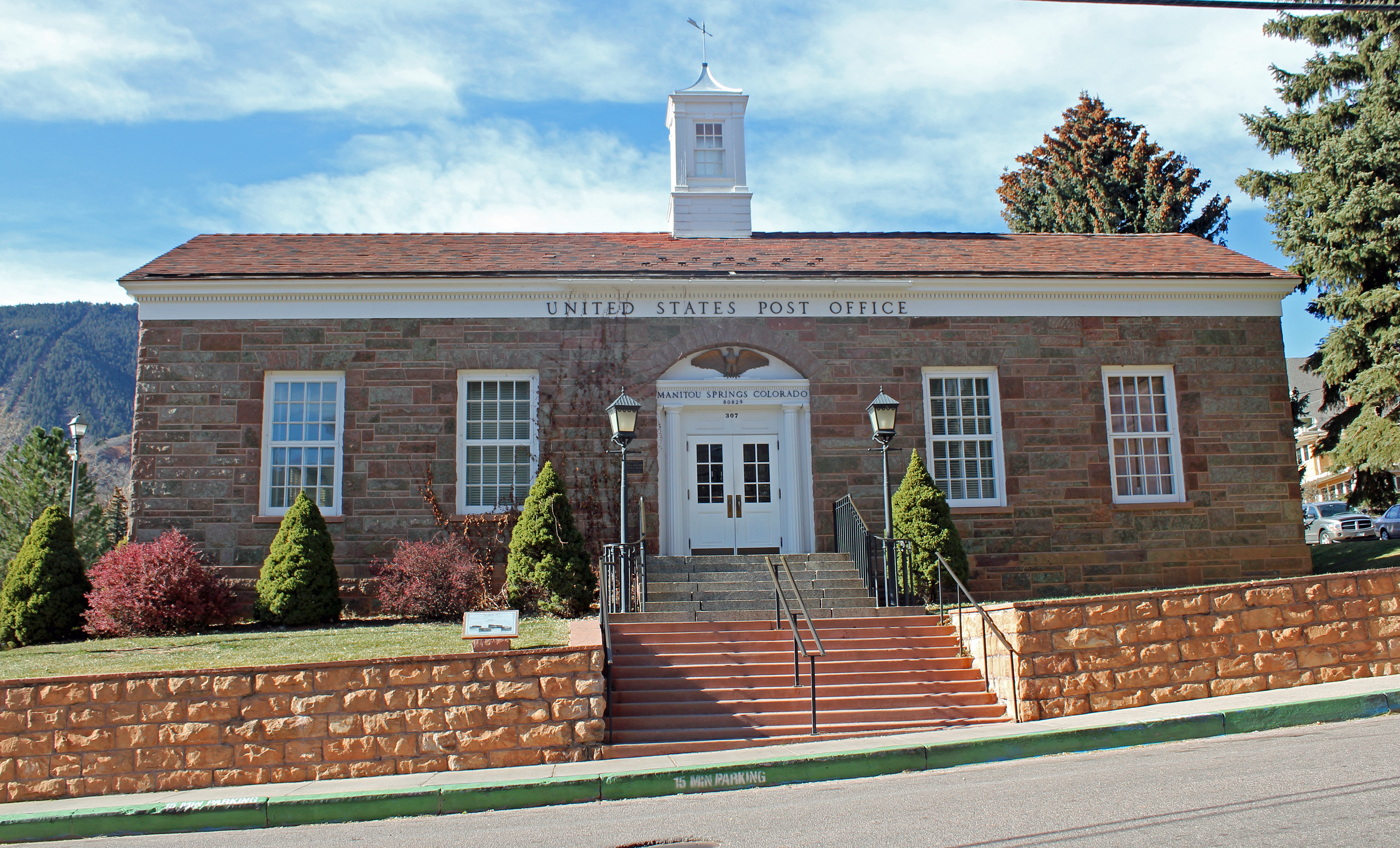

- Location within Colorado Location within the United States
- Location: 307 Canon Avenue, Manitou Springs, Colorado
- Coordinates: 38°51′35.67″N 104°55′4.44″W
- Architect: Louis A. Simon
- Architectural style: Colonial Revival
- NRHP reference No.: 86000181
- Added to NRHP: 1986

US Post Office-Manitou Springs Main or Manitou Springs Post Office is a historic building located on Canon Avenue in Manitou Springs, Colorado. It is on the National Register of Historic Places.

== Overview ==
The United States post office is built upon the site of Jerome B. Wheeler's Windemere estate. The colonial style building is made of blocks of locally quarried reddish green sandstone. The post office opened in 1940 or 1941. At the time it was the only United States post office to be made with locally quarried stone. The building is a one and a half storied, rectangular structure. Instead of a basement, storage is available in the half story that runs along the west side of the building. One of the town's springs is located just south of the post office.

== Mural ==
In 1942 a Works Progress Administration mural title "Hunters, Red and White" was created by Archie Musick.

A plaque by the mural reads:

Depression-era public art programs coincided with the heyday of Colorado Springs' art school, the Broadmoor Art Academy: Its students and teachers painted murals in federal buildings nationwide. For Manitou’s post office mural competition, my father, Archie Musick, depicted the legend of Manitou’s springs: "the God Manitou in a fit of rage clubbing a quarrelsome chief." His frieze of Indian-trapper life across the bottom of the submitted sketch was so popular with "the brass in Washington…they told me to dump the main design and blow up the frieze to fill the entire space." Painted when many federal murals were nationalistic – just months after Pearl Harbor – this mural’s ambiguity and unusual dry-pigment / glaze technique are distinctive: "Hunters Red and White" embodies some historical suggestions from his friend, author Frank Waters – Manitou’s first cabin, explorers Pike and Fremont – but mostly Archie’s own inspiration from fantasy, pictographs, artist friends (including Japanese-American artists sheltering here), and the beloved local rocky landscape.

== See also ==
- List of United States post offices
- Manitou Springs Historic District
- List of Manitou Springs Historic District buildings
