= Otero County, Colorado =

County in Colorado, United States

- County
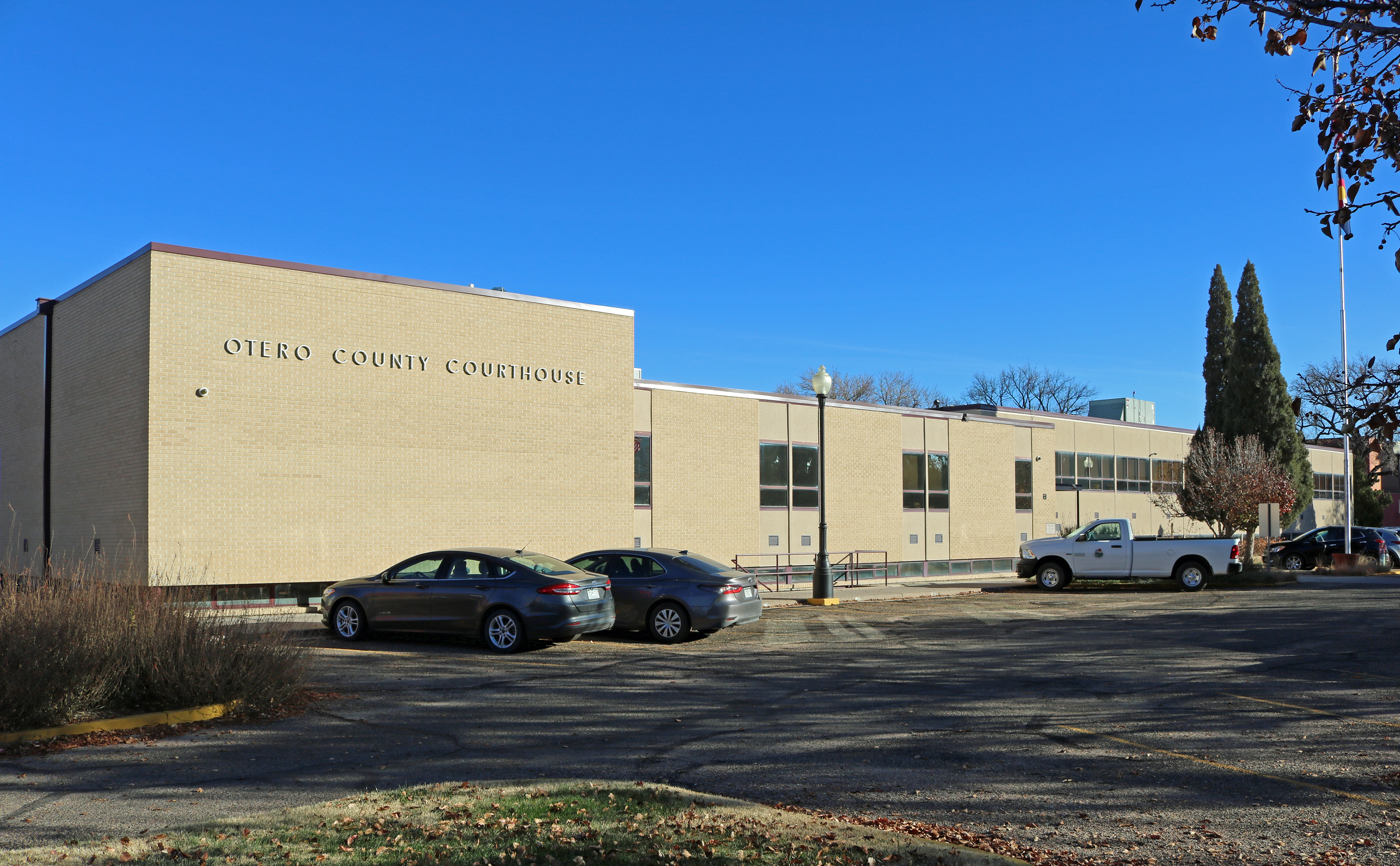
- Otero County Courthouse in La Junta

- Location within the U.S. state of Colorado
- Coordinates: 37.90°N 103.71°W
- Country: United States
- State: Colorado
- Founded: March 25, 1889
- Named for: Miguel Antonio Otero
- Seat: La Junta
- Largest city: La Junta

Area
  - Total: 1,270 sq mi (3,300 km^{2})
  - Land: 1,262 sq mi (3,270 km^{2})
  - Water: 7.7 sq mi (20 km^{2}) 0.6%

Population (2020)
  - Total: 18,690
  - Estimate (2025): 17,683 ▼
  - Density: 14.81/sq mi (5.718/km^{2})
- Time zone: UTC−7 (Mountain)
  - Summer (DST): UTC−6 (MDT)
- Congressional district: 3rd
- Website: oterocounty.colorado.gov

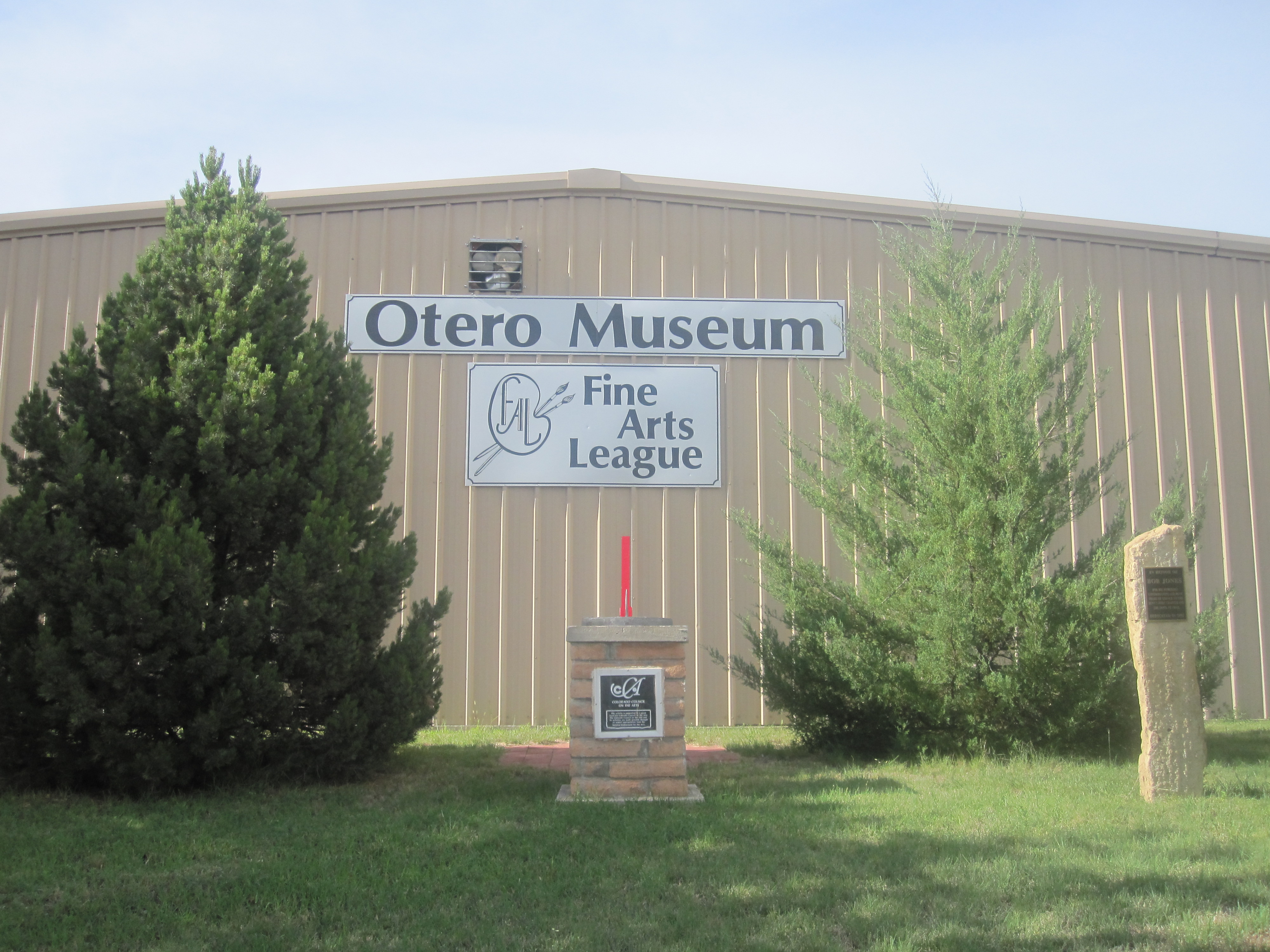
Otero Museum and Fine Arts League in La Junta

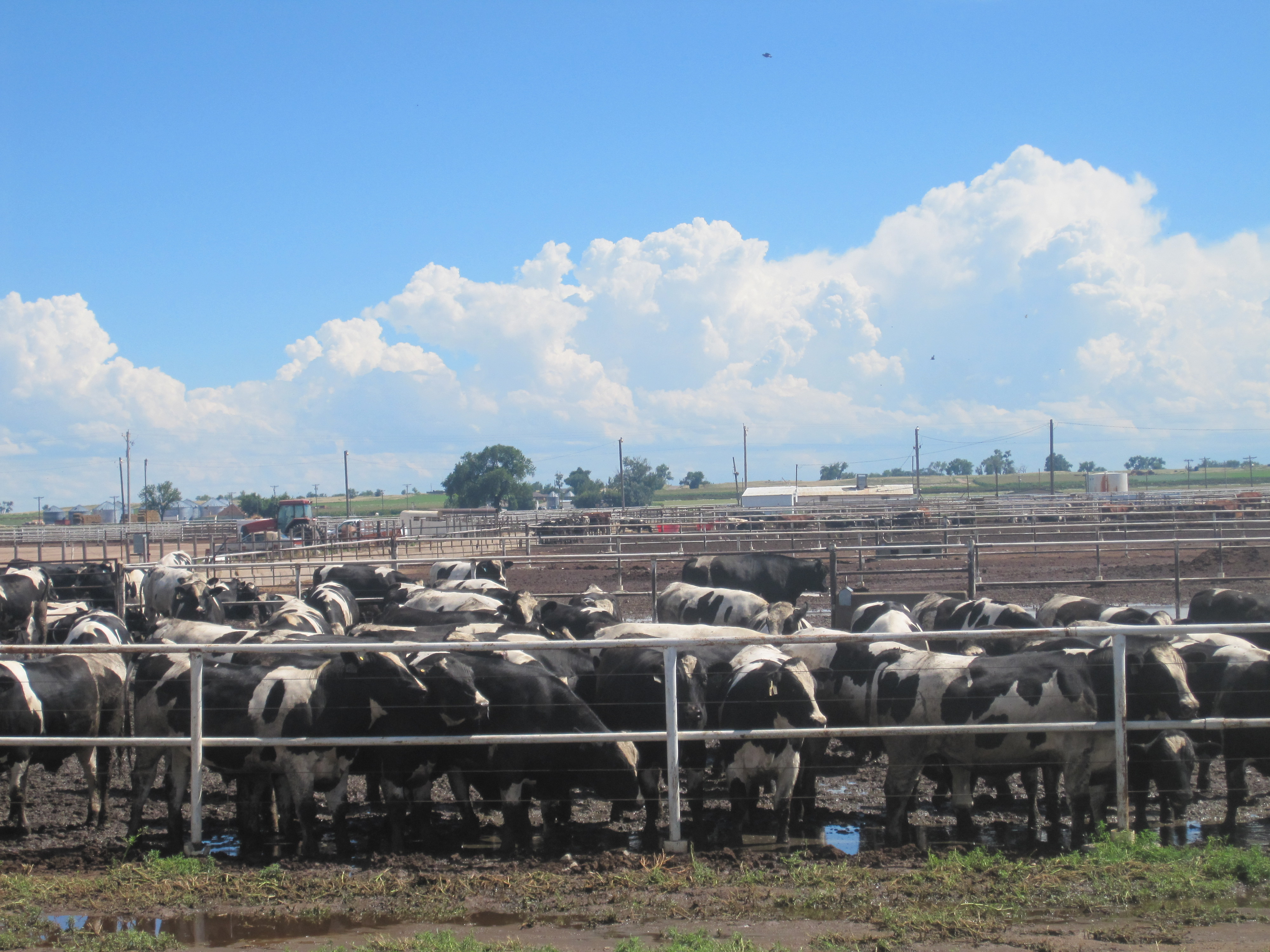
Cattle feedlot in Otero County west of Rocky Ford

Otero County is a county located in the U.S. state of Colorado. As of the 2020 census, the population was 18,690. The county seat is La Junta. The county was named for Miguel Antonio Otero, one of the founders of the town of La Junta and a member of a prominent Hispanic family.

== Geography ==
According to the U.S. Census Bureau, the county has a total area of 1,270 square miles (3,300 km^{2}), of which 1,262 square miles (3,270 km^{2}) is land and 7.7 square miles (20 km^{2}) (0.6%) is water.

=== Adjacent counties ===
- Crowley County - north
- Kiowa County - northeast
- Bent County - east
- Las Animas County - south
- Pueblo County - west

=== Major highways ===
- U.S. Highway 50
- U.S. Highway 350
- State Highway 10
- State Highway 71
- State Highway 109
- State Highway 167
- State Highway 207
- State Highway 266

=== National protected areas ===
- Bent's Old Fort National Historic Site
- Comanche National Grassland
- Santa Fe National Historic Trail

=== Trails and byways ===
- American Discovery Trail
- Santa Fe Trail National Scenic Byway

== Demographics ==
Historical population
| Census | Pop. | Note | %± |
|---|---|---|---|
| 1890 | 4,192 | | — |
| 1900 | 11,522 | | 174.9% |
| 1910 | 20,201 | | 75.3% |
| 1920 | 22,623 | | 12.0% |
| 1930 | 24,390 | | 7.8% |
| 1940 | 23,571 | | −3.4% |
| 1950 | 25,275 | | 7.2% |
| 1960 | 24,128 | | −4.5% |
| 1970 | 23,523 | | −2.5% |
| 1980 | 22,567 | | −4.1% |
| 1990 | 20,185 | | −10.6% |
| 2000 | 20,311 | | 0.6% |
| 2010 | 18,831 | | −7.3% |
| 2020 | 18,690 | | −0.7% |
| 2025 (est.) | 17,683 | ▼ | −5.4% |
U.S. Decennial Census; 1790-1960 1900-1990; 1990-2000 2010-2020

=== 2020 census ===
As of the 2020 census, the county had a population of 18,690. Of the residents, 23.4% were under the age of 18 and 21.5% were 65 years of age or older; the median age was 41.1 years. For every 100 females there were 97.3 males, and for every 100 females age 18 and over there were 96.0 males. 41.7% of residents lived in urban areas and 58.3% lived in rural areas.

Otero County, Colorado – Racial and ethnic composition Note: the US Census treats Hispanic/Latino as an ethnic category. This table excludes Latinos from the racial categories and assigns them to a separate category. Hispanics/Latinos may be of any race.
| Race / Ethnicity (NH = Non-Hispanic) | Pop 2000 | Pop 2010 | Pop 2020 | % 2000 | % 2010 | % 2020 |
|---|---|---|---|---|---|---|
| White alone (NH) | 12,014 | 10,639 | 10,013 | 59.15% | 56.50% | 53.57% |
| Black or African American alone (NH) | 111 | 93 | 134 | 0.55% | 0.49% | 0.72% |
| Native American or Alaska Native alone (NH) | 134 | 111 | 112 | 0.66% | 0.59% | 0.60% |
| Asian alone (NH) | 134 | 135 | 98 | 0.66% | 0.72% | 0.52% |
| Pacific Islander alone (NH) | 6 | 7 | 28 | 0.03% | 0.04% | 0.15% |
| Other race alone (NH) | 10 | 24 | 103 | 0.05% | 0.13% | 0.55% |
| Mixed race or Multiracial (NH) | 260 | 226 | 500 | 1.28% | 1.20% | 2.68% |
| Hispanic or Latino (any race) | 7,642 | 7,596 | 7,702 | 37.62% | 40.34% | 41.21% |
| Total | 20,311 | 18,831 | 18,690 | 100.00% | 100.00% | 100.00% |

The racial makeup of the county was 68.7% White, 0.9% Black or African American, 2.0% American Indian and Alaska Native, 0.5% Asian, 0.1% Native Hawaiian and Pacific Islander, 12.6% from some other race, and 15.1% from two or more races. Hispanic or Latino residents of any race comprised 41.2% of the population.

There were 7,676 households in the county, of which 28.4% had children under the age of 18 living with them and 29.7% had a female householder with no spouse or partner present. About 32.7% of all households were made up of individuals and 16.5% had someone living alone who was 65 years of age or older.

There were 8,716 housing units, of which 11.9% were vacant. Among occupied housing units, 64.2% were owner-occupied and 35.8% were renter-occupied. The homeowner vacancy rate was 2.0% and the rental vacancy rate was 9.5%.

=== 2000 census ===
At the 2000 census there were 20,311 people, 7,920 households, and 5,472 families living in the county. The population density was 16 people per square mile (6.2 people/km^{2}). There were 8,813 housing units at an average density of 7 units per square mile (2.7 units/km^{2}). The racial makeup of the county was 79.02% White, 0.76% Black or African American, 1.43% Native American, 0.70% Asian, 0.08% Pacific Islander, 15.06% from other races, and 2.96% from two or more races. 37.62% of the population were Hispanic or Latino of any race. Of the 7,920 households 32.20% had children under the age of 18 living with them, 52.70% were married couples living together, 12.00% had a female householder with no husband present, and 30.90% were non-families. 27.80% of households were one person and 12.90% were one person aged 65 or older. The average household size was 2.49 and the average family size was 3.04.

The age distribution was 26.90% under the age of 18, 8.90% from 18 to 24, 24.40% from 25 to 44, 23.40% from 45 to 64, and 16.50% 65 or older. The median age was 38 years. For every 100 females there were 95.60 males. For every 100 females age 18 and over, there were 91.50 males.

The median household income was $29,738 and the median family income was $35,906. Males had a median income of $26,996 versus $21,001 for females. The per capita income for the county was $15,113. About 14.20% of families and 18.80% of the population were below the poverty line, including 25.90% of those under age 18 and 11.80% of those age 65 or over.

== Politics ==
Otero is a strongly Republican county, although less so than the counties of the Colorado High Plains. It was last won for the Democratic Party by Bill Clinton in 1996. Before that, Otero tended to be a Republican-leaning county at the Presidential level, although it did vote for Wilson twice, FDR in 1932 and 1936, Truman in 1948 and Lyndon Johnson in 1964.

United States presidential election results for Otero County, Colorado
| Year | Republican | | Democratic | | Third party(ies) | |
| Year | No. | % | No. | % | No. | % |
|---|---|---|---|---|---|---|
| 1892 | 324 | 18.23% | 0 | 0.00% | 1,453 | 81.77% |
| 1896 | 524 | 19.13% | 2,167 | 79.12% | 48 | 1.75% |
| 1900 | 1,913 | 43.73% | 2,266 | 51.79% | 196 | 4.48% |
| 1904 | 2,975 | 53.98% | 2,225 | 40.37% | 311 | 5.64% |
| 1908 | 3,232 | 44.47% | 3,542 | 48.73% | 494 | 6.80% |
| 1912 | 1,293 | 20.98% | 2,885 | 46.80% | 1,986 | 32.22% |
| 1916 | 2,678 | 38.68% | 3,963 | 57.24% | 283 | 4.09% |
| 1920 | 3,846 | 55.93% | 2,727 | 39.66% | 303 | 4.41% |
| 1924 | 4,694 | 59.19% | 1,938 | 24.44% | 1,298 | 16.37% |
| 1928 | 5,788 | 74.88% | 1,876 | 24.27% | 66 | 0.85% |
| 1932 | 3,974 | 42.79% | 5,107 | 54.99% | 206 | 2.22% |
| 1936 | 3,859 | 39.49% | 5,775 | 59.10% | 138 | 1.41% |
| 1940 | 5,459 | 54.11% | 4,567 | 45.27% | 62 | 0.61% |
| 1944 | 5,002 | 56.74% | 3,791 | 43.00% | 23 | 0.26% |
| 1948 | 4,311 | 33.08% | 8,640 | 66.30% | 81 | 0.62% |
| 1952 | 6,552 | 63.57% | 3,721 | 36.10% | 34 | 0.33% |
| 1956 | 5,964 | 61.53% | 3,722 | 38.40% | 7 | 0.07% |
| 1960 | 6,015 | 58.80% | 4,199 | 41.05% | 15 | 0.15% |
| 1964 | 3,605 | 37.41% | 5,999 | 62.26% | 32 | 0.33% |
| 1968 | 4,690 | 49.66% | 3,891 | 41.20% | 864 | 9.15% |
| 1972 | 6,016 | 65.75% | 2,929 | 32.01% | 205 | 2.24% |
| 1976 | 4,597 | 51.54% | 4,118 | 46.17% | 205 | 2.30% |
| 1980 | 4,801 | 54.55% | 3,294 | 37.43% | 706 | 8.02% |
| 1984 | 5,373 | 62.37% | 3,005 | 34.88% | 237 | 2.75% |
| 1988 | 4,265 | 51.39% | 3,910 | 47.11% | 124 | 1.49% |
| 1992 | 3,120 | 37.53% | 3,485 | 41.92% | 1,708 | 20.55% |
| 1996 | 3,356 | 45.13% | 3,386 | 45.53% | 695 | 9.35% |
| 2000 | 4,082 | 55.83% | 2,963 | 40.52% | 267 | 3.65% |
| 2004 | 4,947 | 60.48% | 3,164 | 38.68% | 69 | 0.84% |
| 2008 | 4,393 | 54.47% | 3,547 | 43.98% | 125 | 1.55% |
| 2012 | 4,382 | 53.49% | 3,647 | 44.52% | 163 | 1.99% |
| 2016 | 4,928 | 58.31% | 2,943 | 34.82% | 581 | 6.87% |
| 2020 | 5,756 | 60.11% | 3,605 | 37.65% | 215 | 2.25% |
| 2024 | 5,520 | 61.84% | 3,164 | 35.45% | 242 | 2.71% |

United States Senate election results for Otero County, Colorado2
| Year | Republican | | Democratic | | Third party(ies) | |
| Year | No. | % | No. | % | No. | % |
|---|---|---|---|---|---|---|
| 2020 | 5,731 | 61.18% | 3,428 | 36.60% | 208 | 2.22% |

United States Senate election results for Otero County, Colorado3
| Year | Republican | | Democratic | | Third party(ies) | |
| Year | No. | % | No. | % | No. | % |
|---|---|---|---|---|---|---|
| 2022 | 3,958 | 54.70% | 3,052 | 42.18% | 226 | 3.12% |

Colorado Gubernatorial election results for Otero County
| Year | Republican | | Democratic | | Third party(ies) | |
| Year | No. | % | No. | % | No. | % |
|---|---|---|---|---|---|---|
| 2022 | 4,053 | 55.93% | 2,951 | 40.73% | 242 | 3.34% |

== Communities ==
=== Cities ===
- La Junta
- Rocky Ford

=== Towns ===
- Cheraw
- Fowler
- Manzanola
- Swink

=== Census-designated places ===
- La Junta Gardens
- North La Junta

== See also ==
- Bibliography of Colorado
- Geography of Colorado
- History of Colorado
  - G.W. Swink, pioneer county commissioner
  - National Register of Historic Places listings in Otero County, Colorado
- Index of Colorado-related articles
- List of Colorado-related lists
  - List of counties in Colorado
- Outline of Colorado
