= Cheraw, Colorado =

Statutory town in Otero County, Colorado, USA

- statutory town
- Town of Cheraw
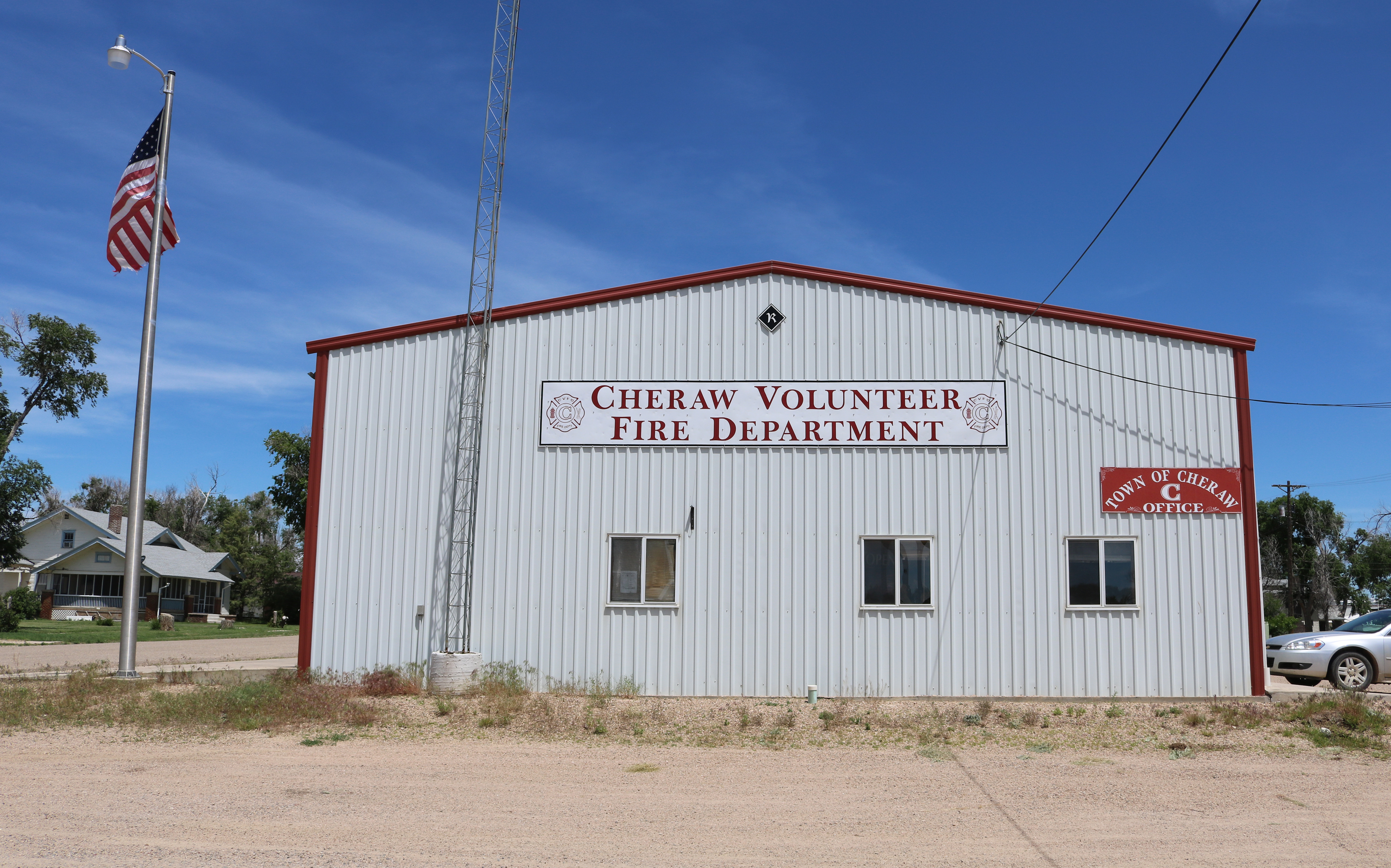
- Fire department and town office (2017)

- Location of the Town of Cheraw in Otero County, Colorado
- Coordinates: 38°06′27″N 103°30′40″W
- Country: United States
- State: Colorado
- County: Otero
- Incorporated: April 17, 1917

Government
  - Type: Statutory town

Area
  - Total: 0.183 sq mi (0.474 km^{2})
  - Land: 0.180 sq mi (0.467 km^{2})
  - Water: 0.0027 sq mi (0.007 km^{2})
- Elevation: 4,131 ft (1,259 m)

Population (2020)
  - Total: 237
- Time zone: UTC−07:00 (MST)
  - Summer (DST): UTC−06:00 (MDT)
- ZIP code: 81030
- Area code: 719
- GNIS town ID: 2413193
- FIPS code: 08-13460
- Website: Official website

Cheraw is a statutory town located in Otero County, Colorado, United States. The town population was 237 at the 2020 United States census.

== History ==
The Cheraw, Colorado, post office opened on August 13, 1910, and the Town of Cheraw was incorporated on April 17, 1917. In 1917, Cheraw was the smallest town in the world with a regimental band. Cheraw had a population of 80, half of whom were men serving in the Colorado National Guard Second Regiment Band under the leadership of Sergeant Luther D. Armstrong, attached to the regiment of General Cameron and the 115th Ammunition Train commanded by Colonel Danks.

In 1920, the U.S. census of the town of Cheraw reported a population of 186 in 49 households within the town limits. Fewer than ten of the town's adults had been born in Colorado; most were from the Midwest. The largest demographic group, 15 percent of the population, were resident aliens who had immigrated from Mexico within the previous decade.

The men's occupations in 1920 included blacksmith, salesman, publisher, lumberyard manager, retail merchant, laborer, wagon driver, bank cashier, barber, physician, druggist, teacher, minister, carpenter, farmer and farm laborers, alfalfa mill manager and laborers, bank bookkeeper, railroad depot operator, [illegible] at pool hall, railroad laborer, and auto mechanic. Women were employed at paying occupations as saleslady, teacher, manager of the telephone exchange, postal workers, and postmistress. The census taker was also a woman.

== Geography ==
At the 2020 United States census, the town had a total area of 117 acres (0.474 km^{2}) including 1.7 acres (0.007 km^{2}) of water.

== Climate ==
According to the Köppen Climate Classification system, Cheraw has a cold semi-arid climate, abbreviated "BSk" on climate maps. The hottest temperature recorded in Cheraw was 107 °F (41.7 °C) on June 25, 2012, July 24, 2026 and July 27, 2026, while the coldest temperature recorded was −25 °F (−31.7 °C) on February 17, 2021.

Climate data for Cheraw, Colorado, 1991–2020 normals, extremes 1994–present
Month	Jan	Feb	Mar	Apr	May	Jun	Jul	Aug	Sep	Oct	Nov	Dec	Year
Record high °F (°C)	77 (25)	87 (31)	93 (34)	95 (35)	101 (38)	107 (42)	107 (42)	106 (41)	103 (39)	98 (37)	87 (31)	80 (27)	107 (42)
Mean maximum °F (°C)	68.7 (20.4)	72.6 (22.6)	82.6 (28.1)	87.4 (30.8)	93.8 (34.3)	101.8 (38.8)	101.4 (38.6)	100.1 (37.8)	97.5 (36.4)	89.8 (32.1)	80.7 (27.1)	69.1 (20.6)	103.2 (39.6)
Mean daily maximum °F (°C)	46.8 (8.2)	50.5 (10.3)	60.9 (16.1)	68.1 (20.1)	76.9 (24.9)	87.4 (30.8)	91.6 (33.1)	89.4 (31.9)	82.6 (28.1)	70.3 (21.3)	57.2 (14.0)	46.9 (8.3)	69.1 (20.6)
Daily mean °F (°C)	29.7 (−1.3)	33.6 (0.9)	43.3 (6.3)	51.0 (10.6)	61.2 (16.2)	71.7 (22.1)	76.2 (24.6)	74.3 (23.5)	66.0 (18.9)	52.7 (11.5)	40.0 (4.4)	30.2 (−1.0)	52.5 (11.4)
Mean daily minimum °F (°C)	12.7 (−10.7)	16.7 (−8.5)	25.7 (−3.5)	33.9 (1.1)	45.4 (7.4)	56.0 (13.3)	60.8 (16.0)	59.2 (15.1)	49.5 (9.7)	35.1 (1.7)	22.8 (−5.1)	13.6 (−10.2)	36.0 (2.2)
Mean minimum °F (°C)	−6.3 (−21.3)	−0.8 (−18.2)	8.9 (−12.8)	21.2 (−6.0)	31.3 (−0.4)	45.7 (7.6)	53.7 (12.1)	51.8 (11.0)	38.2 (3.4)	19.9 (−6.7)	8.1 (−13.3)	−4.4 (−20.2)	−10.8 (−23.8)
Record low °F (°C)	−20 (−29)	−25 (−32)	−4 (−20)	9 (−13)	22 (−6)	36 (2)	44 (7)	47 (8)	27 (−3)	−4 (−20)	−14 (−26)	−22 (−30)	−25 (−32)
Average precipitation inches (mm)	0.32 (8.1)	0.34 (8.6)	0.80 (20)	1.26 (32)	1.61 (41)	1.61 (41)	2.54 (65)	1.84 (47)	0.88 (22)	0.97 (25)	0.43 (11)	0.37 (9.4)	12.97 (330.1)
Average snowfall inches (cm)	2.9 (7.4)	3.7 (9.4)	1.8 (4.6)	0.6 (1.5)	0.0 (0.0)	0.0 (0.0)	0.0 (0.0)	0.0 (0.0)	0.0 (0.0)	0.5 (1.3)	1.7 (4.3)	2.9 (7.4)	14.1 (35.9)
Average precipitation days (≥ 0.01 in)	2.3	2.7	3.9	5.2	6.2	5.5	6.9	6.1	4.4	3.9	2.3	2.9	52.3
Average snowy days (≥ 0.1 in)	0.9	1.2	0.7	0.3	0.0	0.0	0.0	0.0	0.0	0.2	0.6	1.1	5.0
Source 1: NOAA
Source 2: National Weather Service (mean maxima/minima 2006–2020)

== Demographics ==
Historical population
Census	Pop.	Note	%±
1920	186		—
1930	293		57.5%
1940	184		−37.2%
1950	174		−5.4%
1960	173		−0.6%
1970	129		−25.4%
1980	233		80.6%
1990	265		13.7%
2000	211		−20.4%
2010	252		19.4%
2020	237		−6.0%
U.S. Decennial Census

As of the census of 2000, there were 211 people, 92 households, and 58 families residing in the town. The population density was 1,289.3 inhabitants per square mile (497.8/km^{2}). There were 102 housing units at an average density of 623.3 per square mile (240.7/km^{2}). The racial makeup of the town was 95.73% White, 0.95% Native American, 2.84% from other races, and 0.47% from two or more races. Hispanic or Latino of any race were 10.90% of the population.

There were 92 households, out of which 33.7% had children under the age of 18 living with them, 46.7% were married couples living together, 8.7% had a female householder with no husband present, and 35.9% were non-families. 31.5% of all households were made up of individuals, and 7.6% had someone living alone who was 65 years of age or older. The average household size was 2.29 and the average family size was 2.92.

In the town, the population was spread out, with 24.2% under the age of 18, 10.4% from 18 to 24, 24.6% from 25 to 44, 29.9% from 45 to 64, and 10.9% who were 65 years of age or older. The median age was 40 years. For every 100 females, there were 90.1 males. For every 100 females age 18 and over, there were 97.5 males.

The median income for a household in the town was $21,250, and the median income for a family was $24,844. Males had a median income of $20,125 versus $23,750 for females. The per capita income for the town was $12,590. About 13.4% of families and 14.2% of the population were below the poverty line, including 16.7% of those under the age of eighteen and 8.6% of those 65 or over.

== See also ==
- List of municipalities in Colorado
