= Rocky Ford, Colorado =

City in Otero County, Colorado, United States

- Statutory city
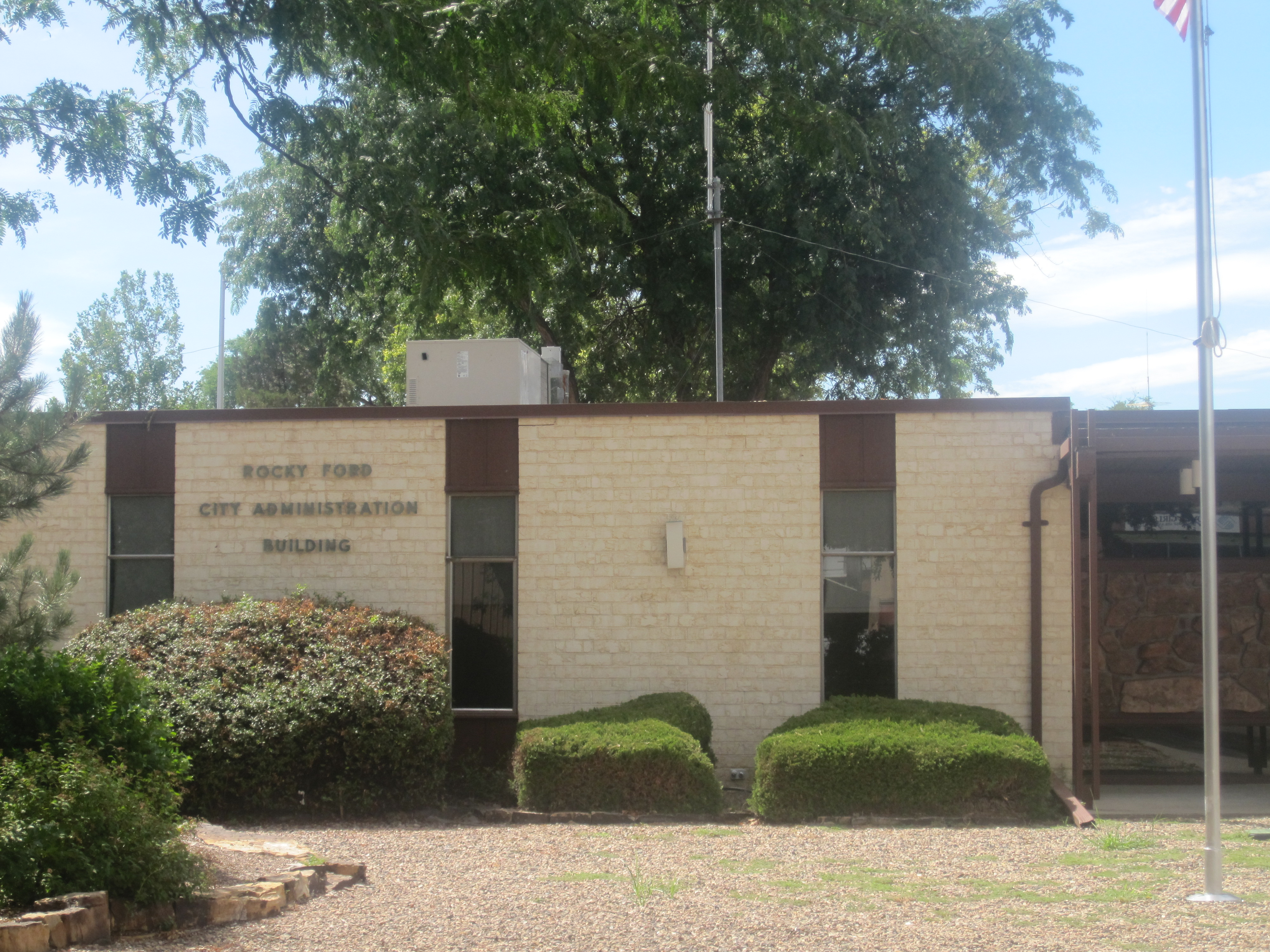
- Rocky Ford City Hall (2010)

- Location within Otero County and Colorado
- Coordinates: 38°3′4″N 103°43′17″W
- Country: United States
- State: Colorado
- County: Otero County
- City: Rocky Ford
- Incorporated: August 19, 1887

Government
  - Type: Statutory City
  - Mayor: Duane Gurulé

Area
  - Total: 1.69 sq mi (4.38 km^{2})
  - Land: 1.68 sq mi (4.35 km^{2})
  - Water: 0.015 sq mi (0.04 km^{2})
- Elevation: 4,180 ft (1,270 m)

Population (2020)
  - Total: 3,876
  - Density: 2,310/sq mi (891/km^{2})
- Time zone: UTC-7 (Mountain (MST))
  - Summer (DST): UTC-6 (MDT)
- ZIP code: 81067
- Area code: 719
- GNIS feature: 2410983
- FIPS code: 08-65190
- Website: www.cityofrockyfordco.gov

Rocky Ford is a statutory city located in Otero County, Colorado, United States. The population was 3,876 at the 2020 census.

== History ==
The community was named for a rocky ford across the Arkansas River near the original town site.

== Geography ==
According to the United States Census Bureau, the city has a total area of 1.7 square miles (4.4 km^{2}), of which, 1.7 square miles (4.4 km^{2}) is land and 0.58% is water.

== Demographics ==
Historical population
Census	Pop.	Note	%±
1880	47		—
1890	468		895.7%
1900	2,018		331.2%
1910	3,230		60.1%
1920	3,746		16.0%
1930	3,426		−8.5%
1940	3,493		2.0%
1950	4,087		17.0%
1960	4,929		20.6%
1970	4,859		−1.4%
1980	4,804		−1.1%
1990	4,162		−13.4%
2000	4,286		3.0%
2010	3,957		−7.7%
2020	3,876		−2.0%
U.S. Decennial Census

=== 2020 census ===
As of the 2020 census, Rocky Ford had a population of 3,876. The median age was 41.4 years. 23.2% of residents were under the age of 18 and 21.9% of residents were 65 years of age or older. For every 100 females there were 97.2 males, and for every 100 females age 18 and over there were 99.4 males age 18 and over.

0.0% of residents lived in urban areas, while 100.0% lived in rural areas.

There were 1,595 households in Rocky Ford, of which 27.6% had children under the age of 18 living in them. Of all households, 35.5% were married-couple households, 24.9% were households with a male householder and no spouse or partner present, and 33.4% were households with a female householder and no spouse or partner present. About 36.8% of all households were made up of individuals and 19.5% had someone living alone who was 65 years of age or older.

There were 1,854 housing units, of which 14.0% were vacant. The homeowner vacancy rate was 2.2% and the rental vacancy rate was 7.9%.

Racial composition as of the 2020 census
Race	Number	Percent
White	2,357	60.8%
Black or African American	37	1.0%
American Indian and Alaska Native	81	2.1%
Asian	27	0.7%
Native Hawaiian and Other Pacific Islander	4	0.1%
Some other race	638	16.5%
Two or more races	732	18.9%
Hispanic or Latino (of any race)	2,208	57.0%

=== 2000 census ===
As of the census of 2000, there were 4,286 people, 1,655 households, and 1,136 families residing in the city. The population density was 2,521.8 inhabitants per square mile (973.7/km^{2}). There were 1,852 housing units at an average density of 1,089.7 per square mile (420.7/km^{2}). The racial makeup of the city was 72.42% White, 0.40% African American, 1.47% Native American, 0.75% Asian, 0.12% Pacific Islander, 21.86% from other races, and 2.99% from two or more races. Hispanic or Latino people of any race were 57.14% of the population.

There were 1,655 households, out of which 33.0% had children under the age of 18 living with them, 48.1% were married couples living together, 15.5% had a female householder with no husband present, and 31.3% were non-families. 28.0% of all households were made up of individuals, and 12.7% had someone living alone who was 65 years of age or older. The average household size was 2.53 and the average family size was 3.07.

In the city, the population was spread out, with 28.2% under the age of 18, 8.7% from 18 to 24, 23.9% from 25 to 44, 21.6% from 45 to 64, and 17.6% who were 65 years of age or older. The median age was 37 years. For every 100 females, there were 95.9 males. For every 100 females age 18 and over, there were 91.2 males.

The median income for a household in the city was $23,359, and the median income for a family was $29,470. Males had a median income of $26,271 versus $17,485 for females. The per capita income for the city was $12,742. About 14.6% of families and 20.3% of the population were below the poverty line, including 28.2% of those under age 18 and 11.6% of those age 65 or over.

== Economy ==
Rocky Ford is noted for its watermelon, cantaloupe and agriculture due to its soil content and fluctuation in temperatures providing great growing conditions.

== Transportation ==
Rocky Ford is part of Colorado's Bustang network. It is along the Lamar-Pueblo-Colorado Springs Outrider line.

== Notable people ==
Notable individuals who were born in or have lived in Rocky Ford include:

- Lewis Babcock (1943- ), judge
- Marvin Cordova, Jr. (1985- ), light welterweight boxer
- Paul Gebhard (1917–2015), anthropologist, sexologist
- Blaine Gibson (1918–2015), Disney sculptor and animator
- Earl T. Newbry (1900–1995), Oregon Secretary of State
- Manuel T. Pacheco (1941- ), university president
- George W. Swink (1836–1910), land developer, fruit grower
- Robert Swink (1918–2000), film editor
- John D. Vanderhoof (1922–2013), 37th governor of Colorado

== See also ==
- List of municipalities in Colorado
