= La Junta, Colorado =

City in Otero County, Colorado, United States

- Home rule municipality
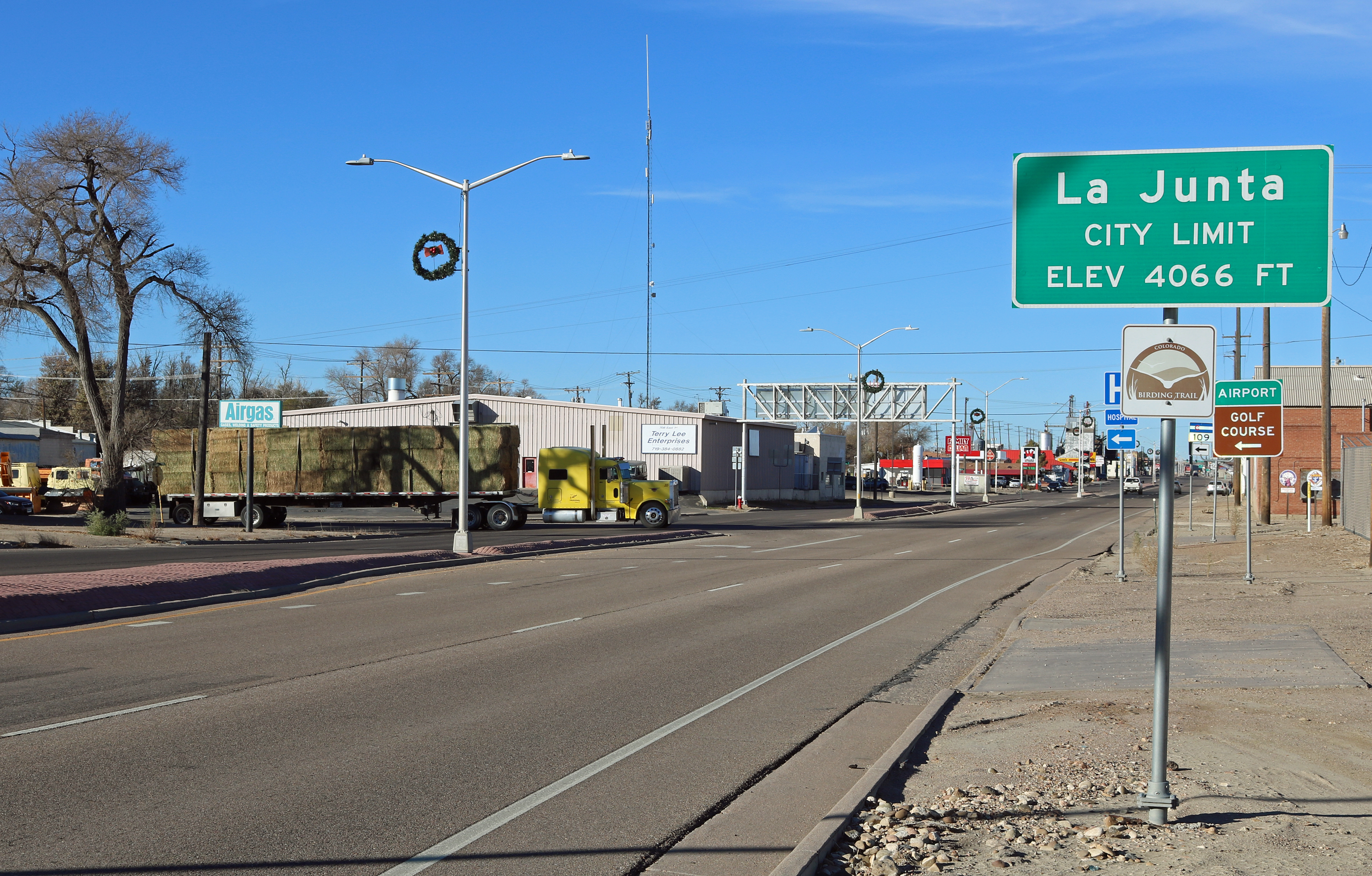
- Looking west along East 1st Street (2021)

- Flag

- Location within Otero County and Colorado
- Coordinates: 37°58′53″N 103°32′51″W
- Country: United States
- State: Colorado
- County: Otero County
- City: La Junta
- Incorporated: April 23, 1881

Government
  - Type: Home Rule Municipality

Area
  - Total: 3.18 sq mi (8.24 km^{2})
  - Land: 3.18 sq mi (8.23 km^{2})
  - Water: 0.0039 sq mi (0.01 km^{2})
- Elevation: 4,078 ft (1,243 m)

Population (2020)
  - Total: 7,322
  - Density: 2,300/sq mi (890/km^{2})
- Time zone: UTC−7 (Mountain (MST))
  - Summer (DST): UTC−6 (MDT)
- ZIP code: 81050
- Area code: 719
- FIPS code: 08-42110
- GNIS feature ID: 2411574
- Website: lajuntacolorado.org

La Junta HOON-tə is a home rule municipality in, the county seat of, and the most populous municipality in Otero County, Colorado, United States. The city population was 7,322 at the 2020 United States census. La Junta is located on the Arkansas River in southeastern Colorado 68 miles (109 km) east of Pueblo. The city is the home of Otero College and hosts the annual Tarantula Fest.

== History ==
La Junta (Spanish for 'the junction') was named for the fact it rested at the intersection of the Santa Fe Trail and a pioneer road to Pueblo. The town developed near Bent's Fort, a fur trading post of the 19th century. The Atchison, Topeka and Santa Fe Railway passed through La Junta, with a branch line to Denver separating here.

During World War II, La Junta had an Army Air Force Training Base outside town. An Air Force detachment of the Strategic Air Command remained there until modern flight simulators developed in the 1980s rendered live flight unnecessary for pilot training maneuvers. At least one military aircraft crashed closeby during such training maneuvers.

== Geography ==
The area is high plains terrain, dry with short grass prairie and sagebrush, and is part of the Southwestern Tablelands ecological region. This area of Colorado is often the warmest. Summer brings numerous days above 100 °F (37.8 °C). The hottest temperature recorded in La Junta was 110 °F (43.3 °C) on June 28, 1990, and June 24, 2012, while the coldest temperature recorded was −23 °F (−30.6 °C) on January 20, 1948.

=== Climate ===
Climate data for La Junta Municipal Airport, Colorado (1991–2020 normals, extremes 1945–present)
Month	Jan	Feb	Mar	Apr	May	Jun	Jul	Aug	Sep	Oct	Nov	Dec	Year
Record high °F (°C)	78 (26)	86 (30)	92 (33)	95 (35)	104 (40)	110 (43)	109 (43)	108 (42)	108 (42)	95 (35)	86 (30)	81 (27)	110 (43)
Mean maximum °F (°C)	68.8 (20.4)	72.9 (22.7)	82.1 (27.8)	88.0 (31.1)	95.5 (35.3)	102.9 (39.4)	104.5 (40.3)	102.3 (39.1)	98.2 (36.8)	90.1 (32.3)	78.2 (25.7)	68.6 (20.3)	105.7 (40.9)
Mean daily maximum °F (°C)	46.5 (8.1)	50.5 (10.3)	61.3 (16.3)	68.8 (20.4)	78.8 (26.0)	90.0 (32.2)	94.5 (34.7)	91.8 (33.2)	84.3 (29.1)	70.5 (21.4)	56.9 (13.8)	46.2 (7.9)	70.0 (21.1)
Daily mean °F (°C)	32.3 (0.2)	35.9 (2.2)	45.5 (7.5)	53.2 (11.8)	63.4 (17.4)	74.2 (23.4)	79.1 (26.2)	76.8 (24.9)	68.6 (20.3)	54.6 (12.6)	41.8 (5.4)	32.3 (0.2)	54.8 (12.7)
Mean daily minimum °F (°C)	18.1 (−7.7)	21.3 (−5.9)	29.6 (−1.3)	37.7 (3.2)	48.0 (8.9)	58.4 (14.7)	63.6 (17.6)	61.8 (16.6)	52.9 (11.6)	38.8 (3.8)	26.8 (−2.9)	18.4 (−7.6)	39.6 (4.2)
Mean minimum °F (°C)	0.1 (−17.7)	3.7 (−15.7)	13.8 (−10.1)	23.2 (−4.9)	34.5 (1.4)	48.0 (8.9)	55.8 (13.2)	54.2 (12.3)	39.2 (4.0)	22.6 (−5.2)	10.5 (−11.9)	−0.9 (−18.3)	−5.2 (−20.7)
Record low °F (°C)	−23 (−31)	−20 (−29)	−17 (−27)	10 (−12)	22 (−6)	38 (3)	48 (9)	43 (6)	22 (−6)	0 (−18)	−11 (−24)	−21 (−29)	−23 (−31)
Average precipitation inches (mm)	0.21 (5.3)	0.25 (6.4)	0.71 (18)	1.22 (31)	1.59 (40)	1.31 (33)	2.21 (56)	1.43 (36)	0.84 (21)	0.94 (24)	0.37 (9.4)	0.26 (6.6)	11.34 (288)
Average precipitation days (≥ 0.01 in)	3.1	3.1	5.3	6.2	7.4	6.6	8.0	7.5	4.8	4.3	3.4	2.6	62.3
Source: NOAA

== Demographics ==
Historical population
Census	Pop.	Note	%±
1890	1,439		—
1900	2,513		74.6%
1910	4,154		65.3%
1920	4,964		19.5%
1930	7,193		44.9%
1940	7,040		−2.1%
1950	7,712		9.5%
1960	8,026		4.1%
1970	8,205		2.2%
1980	8,338		1.6%
1990	7,637		−8.4%
2000	7,568		−0.9%
2010	7,077		−6.5%
2020	7,322		3.5%
U.S. Decennial Census 2020

There were 7,568 people, 2,977 households, and 1,964 families residing in the city. The population density was 2,652.0 inhabitants per square mile (1,023.9/km^{2}). There were 3,277 housing units at an average density of 1,148.3 per square mile (443.4/km^{2}). The racial makeup of the city was 74.22% White, 1.22% African American, 1.77% Native American, 0.86% Asian, 0.13% Pacific Islander, 18.33% from other races, and 3.48% from two or more races. Hispanic or Latino of any race were 43.60% of the population.

There were 2,977 households, out of which 33.7% had children under the age of 18 living with them, 47.0% were married couples living together, 14.7% had a female householder with no husband present, and 34.0% were non-families. 30.9% of all households were made up of individuals, and 15.0% had someone living alone who was 65 years of age or older. The average household size was 2.44 and the average family size was 3.06.

In the city, the population was spread out, with 27.1% under the age of 18, 10.4% from 18 to 24, 24.6% from 25 to 44, 21.4% from 45 to 64, and 16.6% who were 65 years of age or older. The median age was 36 years. For every 100 females, there were 89.2 males. For every 100 females age 18 and over, there were 84.1 males.

The median income for a household in the city was $29,002, and the median income for a family was $36,398. Males had a median income of $26,325 versus $21,324 for females. The per capita income for the city was $14,928. About 16.8% of families and 21.4% of the population were below the poverty line, including 31.4% of those under age 18 and 10.0% of those age 65 or over.

== Arts and culture ==
Tourists come to see tarantulas who are looking for mates during the cooler weather in September and into October each year, in particular during Tarantula Fest. Bent's Old Fort National Historic Site, an important trading post along the Santa Fe Trail, is northeast of La Junta. The Koshare Indian Museum, housed at Otero College, holds a collection of Native American artifacts. The Koshare Indian museum hosts a unique Boy Scout/Explorer program which trains the Scouts in both Native American dance and building traditional outfits. The Scouts give dance performances during the summer and also host Scout troops from other areas. Purgatoire River track site, one of the largest dinosaur track sites in North America, is south of La Junta.

The Caboose is the drive-through for the State Bank, which was established in 1893. The bank has been remodeled with antiques, including a teller line from the late 1890s.

== Media ==
The city is served by the daily newspaper The Tribune-Democrat. The city is also served by a local radio station that broadcasts in AM and FM. They are KBLJ 1400 AM and KTHN 92.1 FM.

== Infrastructure ==
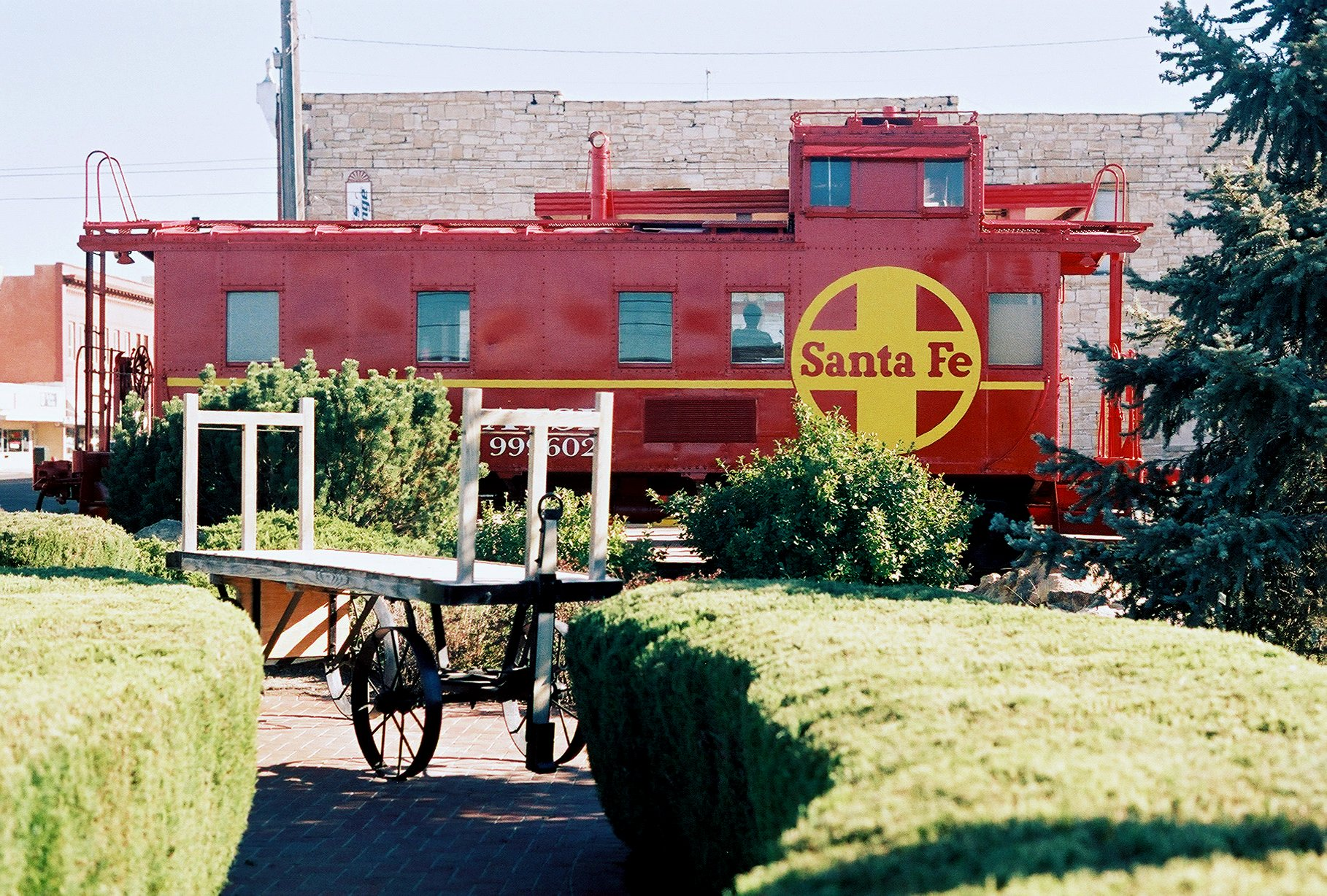
This railroad caboose serves as the drive-up window for The State Bank.

=== Transportation ===
The Southwest Chief provides Amtrak passenger rail service to the community.

La Junta, until recently, had a railroad yard for assembling freight trains for the climb over Raton Pass. BNSF runs freight trains between Denver and Kansas/Texas via La Junta. The sole remaining major train crossing Raton Pass today is the daily Southwest Chief, in both directions, between Los Angeles and Chicago.

U.S. Highway 50 travels through La Junta, approaching from Pueblo to the northwest and continuing eastward towards Lamar and into Kansas. U.S. Highway 350 begins at La Junta and travels southwest before reaching Trinidad. State Highway 10 also begins at La Junta and travels west-southwest before reaching Walsenburg.

The city operates a public bus system with one route that circles the city. Intercity transportation is provided by Bustang. La Junta is part of the Lamar-Pueblo-Colorado Springs Outrider line.

The former military airport, located 5 miles (8.0 km) north of La Junta, has 77 acres (31 ha) of tarmac and two runways. One runway (east-west) is 6,851 feet (2,088 m) long and the other is 5,800 feet (1,800 m). .

=== Health care ===
The city and region are served by the Arkansas Valley Regional Medical Center, located in La Junta.

== See also ==
- List of municipalities in Colorado
