= 1966 Milwaukee Panthers football team =

American college football season

1966 Milwaukee Panthers football
- Conference: Independent
- Record: 4–5–1
- Head coach: Wally Dreyer (7th season)
- Home stadium: Shorewood Stadium

1966 NCAA College Division independents football records
	Conf.			Overall
Team	W	L	T	W		L		T
St. Norbert		–		7	–	1	–	1
Parsons		–		9	–	2	–	0
Drake		–		8	–	2	–	0
Northern Illinois		–		8	–	2	–	0
Indiana (PA)		–		7	–	2	–	0
Santa Clara		–		7	–	2	–	0
Cortland		–		6	–	2	–	0
Northeastern		–		6	–	2	–	0
Akron		–		6	–	3	–	0
Northern Michigan		–		6	–	3	–	1
Samford		–		6	–	3	–	1
Carnegie Tech		–		5	–	3	–	0
Eastern Michigan		–		5	–	3	–	1
Ashland		–		5	–	3	–	2
Northern Arizona		–		6	–	4	–	0
UC Santa Barbara		–		6	–	4	–	0
Wheaton (IL)		–		5	–	4	–	0
Boston University		–		5	–	5	–	0
Cal Poly Pomona		–		5	–	5	–	0
Chattanooga		–		5	–	5	–	0
Colorado College		–		4	–	4	–	0
Wabash		–		4	–	4	–	1
Milwaukee		–		4	–	5	–	1
Southern Illinois		–		4	–	5	–	1
UC Riverside		–		4	–	5	–	0
Tampa		–		4	–	5	–	0
Rose Poly		–		3	–	4	–	1
Hawaii		–		4	–	6	–	0
Portland State		–		4	–	6	–	0
Lake Forest		–		2	–	5	–	0
Wayne State (MI)		–		2	–	6	–	0
Mississippi Valley State		–		2	–	7	–	0

The 1966 Milwaukee Panthers football team represented the University of Wisconsin–Milwaukee as an independent during the 1966 NCAA College Division football season. Led by Wally Dreyer in his seventh season as head coach, Milwaukee compiled a record of 4–5–1. The Panthers offense scored 183 points while the defense allowed 250 points.

== Schedule ==
Date	Opponent	Site	Result	Attendance	Source
September 10	North Dakota State	Shorewood Stadium; Shorewood, WI	L 6–46	3,000	
September 17	Illinois State	Shorewood Stadium; Shorewood, WI	W 32–14	3,500	
September 24	at Wayne State (MI)	UD Stadium; Detroit, MI	W 37–20	3,360	
October 1	at Eastern Illinois	Lincoln Field; Charleston, IL	W 7–3	700–2,500	
October 8	La Crosse State	Shorewood Stadium; Shorewood, WI	L 0–22	4,000	
October 22	Chicago Circle	Shorewood Stadium; Shorewood, WI	W 49–7	4,000	
October 29	at Ferris State	Top Taggart Field; Big Rapids, MI	T 28–28		
November 5	St. Norbert	Shorewood Stadium; Shorewood, WI	L 8–30	4,500	
November 12	at Bradley	Peoria Stadium; Peoria, IL	L 8–32		
November 19	at Northern Illinois	Huskie Stadium; DeKalb, IL	L 8–48	6,637	
