= 1966 Drake Bulldogs football team =

American college football season

1966 Drake Bulldogs football
- Conference: Independent
- Record: 8–2
- Head coach: Jack Wallace (2nd season)
- Home stadium: Drake Stadium

1966 NCAA College Division independents football records
	Conf.			Overall
Team	W	L	T	W		L		T
St. Norbert		–		7	–	1	–	1
Parsons		–		9	–	2	–	0
Drake		–		8	–	2	–	0
Northern Illinois		–		8	–	2	–	0
Indiana (PA)		–		7	–	2	–	0
Santa Clara		–		7	–	2	–	0
Cortland		–		6	–	2	–	0
Northeastern		–		6	–	2	–	0
Akron		–		6	–	3	–	0
Northern Michigan		–		6	–	3	–	1
Samford		–		6	–	3	–	1
Carnegie Tech		–		5	–	3	–	0
Eastern Michigan		–		5	–	3	–	1
Ashland		–		5	–	3	–	2
Northern Arizona		–		6	–	4	–	0
UC Santa Barbara		–		6	–	4	–	0
Wheaton (IL)		–		5	–	4	–	0
Boston University		–		5	–	5	–	0
Cal Poly Pomona		–		5	–	5	–	0
Chattanooga		–		5	–	5	–	0
Colorado College		–		4	–	4	–	0
Wabash		–		4	–	4	–	1
Milwaukee		–		4	–	5	–	1
Southern Illinois		–		4	–	5	–	1
UC Riverside		–		4	–	5	–	0
Tampa		–		4	–	5	–	0
Rose Poly		–		3	–	4	–	1
Hawaii		–		4	–	6	–	0
Portland State		–		4	–	6	–	0
Lake Forest		–		2	–	5	–	0
Wayne State (MI)		–		2	–	6	–	0
Mississippi Valley State		–		2	–	7	–	0

The 1966 Drake Bulldogs football team was an American football team that represented Drake University as an independent during the 1966 NCAA College Division football season. In its second season under head coach Jack Wallace, the team compiled an 8–2 record and outscored opponents by a total of 297 to 164.

The team's statistical leaders included quarterback Ron Royer with 1,892 passing yards, halfback Ron Oswalt with 329 rushing yards, and end Manley Sarnowsky with 92 receptions for 1,114 yards and 82 points scored (including 25 extra points and five touchdowns). Royer and Sarnowsky broke Drake season records for passing and receiving, and Sarnowsky set an NCAA small-college record with 92 receptions.

The team played its home games at Drake Stadium in Des Moines, Iowa.

== Schedule ==
Date	Opponent	Site	Result	Attendance	Source
September 17	Northwest Missouri State	Drake Stadium; Des Moines, IA	W 27–0	6,500	
September 24	at State College of Iowa	O. R. Latham Stadium; Cedar Falls, IA	W 9–6	7,000	
October 1	Southern Illinois	Drake Stadium; Des Moines, IA	W 30–7	8,500	
October 8	Wichita State	Drake Stadium; Des Moines, IA	W 34–16	9,500	
October 15	at Louisville	Fairgrounds Stadium; Louisville, KY	L 26–66	8,000	
October 22	Western Kentucky	Bowling Green, KY	W 37–21	4,000	
October 29	North Texas State	Drake Stadium; Des Moines, IA	W 17–13	9,100	
November 5	at Quantico Marines	Butler Stadium; Quantico, VA	L 13–21	5,200	
November 12	South Dakota	Drake Stadium; Des Moines, IA	W 31–14	3,200	
November 19	at Omaha	Rosenblatt Stadium; Omaha, NE	W 53–0	525	
