= 1966 Mississippi Valley State Delta Devils football team =

American college football season

1966 Mississippi Valley State Delta Devils football
- Conference: Independent
- Record: 2–7
- Head coach: Curtis Maddox (1st season)
- Home stadium: Magnolia Stadium

1966 NCAA College Division independents football records
	Conf.			Overall
Team	W	L	T	W		L		T
St. Norbert		–		7	–	1	–	1
Parsons		–		9	–	2	–	0
Drake		–		8	–	2	–	0
Northern Illinois		–		8	–	2	–	0
Indiana (PA)		–		7	–	2	–	0
Santa Clara		–		7	–	2	–	0
Cortland		–		6	–	2	–	0
Northeastern		–		6	–	2	–	0
Akron		–		6	–	3	–	0
Northern Michigan		–		6	–	3	–	1
Samford		–		6	–	3	–	1
Carnegie Tech		–		5	–	3	–	0
Eastern Michigan		–		5	–	3	–	1
Ashland		–		5	–	3	–	2
Northern Arizona		–		6	–	4	–	0
UC Santa Barbara		–		6	–	4	–	0
Wheaton (IL)		–		5	–	4	–	0
Boston University		–		5	–	5	–	0
Cal Poly Pomona		–		5	–	5	–	0
Chattanooga		–		5	–	5	–	0
Colorado College		–		4	–	4	–	0
Wabash		–		4	–	4	–	1
Milwaukee		–		4	–	5	–	1
Southern Illinois		–		4	–	5	–	1
UC Riverside		–		4	–	5	–	0
Tampa		–		4	–	5	–	0
Rose Poly		–		3	–	4	–	1
Hawaii		–		4	–	6	–	0
Portland State		–		4	–	6	–	0
Mississippi Valley State		–		3	–	6	–	0
Lake Forest		–		2	–	5	–	0
Wayne State (MI)		–		2	–	6	–	0

The 1966 Mississippi Valley State Delta Devils football team represented Mississippi Valley State College (now known as Mississippi Valley State University) as an independent school during the 1966 NCAA College Division football season. Led by first-year head coach Curtis Maddox, the Delta Devils compiled an overall record of 2–7.

== Schedule ==
Date	Opponent	Site	Result	Attendance	Source
September 17	at Arkansas AM&N	Pumphrey Stadium; Pine Bluff, AR	L 20–59		
September 24	Paul Quinn	Magnolia Stadium; Itta Bena, MS	W 42–0		
October 1	Alabama State	Magnolia Stadium; Itta Bena, MS	L 14–21		
October 8	at Texas Southern	Jeppesen Stadium; Houston, TX	L 8–32		
October 15	Grambling	Magnolia Stadium; Itta Bena, MS	L 33–55		
October 22	Edward Waters	Magnolia Stadium; Itta Bena, MS	W 27–2		
October 29	at Prairie View A&M	Edward L. Blackshear Field; Prairie View, TX	L 8–17	3,000	
November 5	Alcorn A&M	Magnolia Stadium; Itta Bena, MS	L 19–34	2,100	
November 19	at Jackson State	Alumni Field; Jackson, MS	L 12–29	4,128	
