= 1966 East Tennessee State Buccaneers football team =

American college football season

1966 East Tennessee State Buccaneers football
- Conference: Ohio Valley Conference
- Record: 3–6 (2–5 OVC)
- Head coach: John Robert Bell (1st season)
- Home stadium: University Stadium

1966 Ohio Valley Conference football standings
	Conf.					Overall
Team	W		L		T	W		L		T
Morehead State $	6	–	1	–	0	7	–	2	–	0
Middle Tennessee	5	–	2	–	0	7	–	3	–	0
Austin Peay	4	–	3	–	0	6	–	4	–	0
No. 16 Eastern Kentucky	4	–	3	–	0	7	–	3	–	0
Tennessee Tech	4	–	3	–	0	5	–	5	–	0
Western Kentucky	3	–	4	–	0	5	–	5	–	0
East Tennessee State	2	–	5	–	0	3	–	6	–	0
Murray State	0	–	7	–	0	0	–	10	–	0
$ – Conference champion; Rankings from UPI small college poll

The 1966 East Tennessee State Buccaneers football team represented East Tennessee State University as a member of the Ohio Valley Conference (OVC) during the 1966 NCAA College Division football season. Led by first-year head coach John Robert Bell, the Buccaneers compiled an overall record of 3–6, with a mark of 2–5 in conference play, and finished seventh in the OVC.

== Schedule ==
Date	Opponent	Site	Result	Attendance	Source
September 17	at Murray State	Cutchin Stadium; Murray, KY	W 20–16	7,000	
September 24	Western Kentucky	University Stadium; Johnson City, TN	L 7–24	7,100	
October 1	at The Citadel*	Johnson Hagood Stadium; Charleston, SC	L 0–3	7,500	
October 8	at Tennessee Tech	Tucker Stadium; Cookeville, TN	L 3–14	4,000	
October 15	at Eastern Kentucky	Hanger Field; Richmond, KY	L 7–21	5,000	
October 22	Wofford*	University Stadium; Johnson City, TN	W 42–6	8,000	
October 29	Morehead State	University Stadium; Johnson City, TN	L 7–13	3,000	
November 5	at Austin Peay	Municipal Stadium; Clarksville, TN	L 14–22	4,500	
November 12	Middle Tennessee	University Stadium; Johnson City, TN	W 12–0	3,000	
*Non-conference game; Source:
