= Curtis Maddox =

American football and basketball coach (1935–2018)

Biographical details
- Born: August 10, 1935; Greenwood, Mississippi, U.S.
- Died: August 21, 2018 (aged 82)

Playing career

Football
- c. 1955: Mississippi Vocational
- Position: Tackle

Coaching career (HC unless noted)

Football
- 1957: Mississippi Vocational (assistant)
- 1966–1967: Mississippi Valley State
- 1968–1971: Norfolk State

Basketball
- 1962–1963: Mississippi Vocational

Head coaching record
- Overall: 14–36–1 (football)

Curtis G. Maddox (August 10, 1935 – August 21, 2018) was an American football and basketball coach. He served as the head football coach at Mississippi Valley State College—now known as Mississippi Valley State University—from 1966 to 1967 and Norfolk State University from 1968 to 1971, compiling a career college football coaching record of 14–36–1. Maddox was also the head basketball coach at Mississippi Valley State for one season, in 1962–63, when the school was known as Mississippi Vocational College.

Maddox was later CEO and president of Cutron General Contractors, Inc. and vice president for operations at Norfolk State. He died on August 21, 2018.

== Head coaching record ==
=== Football ===
Year	Team	Overall	Conference	Standing	Bowl/playoffs
Mississippi Valley State Delta Devils (NCAA College Division independent) (1966–1967)
1966	Mississippi Valley State	2–7			
1967	Mississippi Valley State	1–8			
Mississippi Valley State:		3–15			
Norfolk State Spartans (Central Intercollegiate Athletic Association) (1968–1971)
1968	Norfolk State	2–5–1	2–4–1	10th	
1969	Norfolk State	4–4	4–3	6th	
1970	Norfolk State	3–6	2–3	6th (Northern)	
1971	Norfolk State	2–6	2–3	4th (Northern)	
Norfolk State:		11–21–1	10–13–1		
Total:		14–36–1			
