= Wally Dreyer =

American football player and coach (1923–2002)

No. 3, 8, 16, 42
- Positions: Defensive back, halfback

Personal information
- Born: February 25, 1923; Milwaukee, Wisconsin, U.S.
- Died: September 27, 2002 (aged 79); Brookfield, Wisconsin, U.S.
- Listed height: 5 ft 10 in (1.78 m)
- Listed weight: 170 lb (77 kg)

Career information
- High school: Washington (Milwaukee); University (Milwaukee)
- College: Wisconsin (1942, 1946-1948); Michigan (1943)
- NFL draft: 1947: 17th round, 155th overall pick

Career history

Playing
- Chicago Bears (1949); Green Bay Packers (1950–1951)

Coaching
- Berlin HS (WI) (1952) Head coach; Rufus King HS (WI) (1953–1959) Head coach; Milwaukee (1960–1969) Head coach

Career NFL statistics
- Rushing yards: 172
- Rushing average: 3.7
- Receptions: 7
- Receiving yards: 94
- Total touchdowns: 1
- Stats at Pro Football Reference

Head coaching record
- Career: College: 26–58–2 (.314)

Walter Otto Dreyer (February 25, 1923 – September 27, 2002) was an American professional football player and coach. He played professionally as a defensive back and halfback in the National Football League (NFL) for the Chicago Bears (1949) and the Green Bay Packers (1950–1951). Dreyer played college football at the University of Wisconsin–Madison and the University of Michigan. He served as the head football coach at the University of Wisconsin–Milwaukee from 1960 to 1969.

== Coaching career ==
Dreyer began his coaching career in 1952 as head football coach at Berlin High School in Berlin, Wisconsin. A year later, he moved to Rufus King High School in Milwaukee, where he compiled a record of 39–15–2 in seven seasons as head football coach and led his teams to three city conference titles.

== Head coaching record ==
=== College ===
Year	Team	Overall	Conference	Standing	Bowl/playoffs
Milwaukee Cardinals (Wisconsin State College Conference) (1960–1963)
1960	Milwaukee	2–6	2–4	7th	
1961	Milwaukee	2–6	2–4	T–9th	
1962	Milwaukee	2–6	2–4	T–7th	
1963	Milwaukee	1–6–1	1–4–1	8th	
Milwaukee Cardinals/Panthers (NCAA College Division independent) (1964–1969)
1964	Milwaukee	5–4			
1965	Milwaukee	2–6			
1966	Milwaukee	4–5–1			
1967	Milwaukee	3–6			
1968	Milwaukee	2–7			
1969	Milwaukee	3–6			
Milwaukee:		26–58–2	7–16–1		
Total:		26–58–2			
