= Clyde Biggers =

American football player, coach, and administrator (1925–1976)

Biographical details
- Born: March 6, 1925; Concord, North Carolina, U.S.
- Died: December 23, 1976 (aged 51); Richmond, Virginia, U.S.

Playing career

Football
- c. 1947: Catawba

Baseball
- c. 1948: Catawba

Coaching career (HC unless noted)

Football
- c. 1950: Fayetteville HS (NC)
- 1952: East Carolina (line)
- 1953–1958: Catawba
- 1959–1964: South Carolina (assistant)
- 1965–1971: Eastern Illinois

Administrative career (AD unless noted)
- 1971–1974: Nebraska–Omaha
- 1974–1976: Richmond

Head coaching record
- Overall: 45–70–6

Clyde W. Biggers (March 6, 1925 – December 23, 1976) was an American football coach and college athletics administrator. He served as the head football coach at Catawba College from 1953 to 1958 and at Eastern Illinois University from 1965 to 1971, compiling a career college football record of 45–70–6. Biggers was then the athletic director at University of Nebraska Omaha from 1971 to 1974 and at the University of Richmond from 1974 until his death in 1976.

Biggers played football and baseball at Catawba College, from which he graduated in 1948. He coached football at Fayetteville High School in Fayetteville, North Carolina before serving as the line coach for the football team at East Carolina College—now East Carolina University—in 1952. Between his tenures as head coach at Catawba and Eastern Illinois, Biggers was an assistant coach at the University of South Carolina. He died of a heart attack at his home in Richmond, Virginia on December 23, 1976.

== Head coaching record ==
Year	Team	Overall	Conference	Standing	Bowl/playoffs
Catawba Indians (North State Conference) (1953–1958)
1953	Catawba	4–5–1	4–1–1	2nd	
1954	Catawba	3–8	2–4	5th	
1955	Catawba	6–4	4–2	2nd	
1956	Catawba	5–4–1	4–2	T–2nd	
1957	Catawba	4–3	3–2	3rd	
1958	Catawba	5–3–2	2–3–1	4th	
Catawba:		27–27–4	19–14–2		
Eastern Illinois Panthers (Interstate Intercollegiate Athletic Conference) (1965–1969)
1965	Eastern Illinois	3–5	1–3	4th	
1966	Eastern Illinois	1–6–1	1–1–1	2nd	
1967	Eastern Illinois	2–6–1	1–2	T–3rd	
1968	Eastern Illinois	4–5	1–2	T–3rd	
1969	Eastern Illinois	2–7	0–3	4th	
Eastern Illinois Panthers (NCAA College Division independent) (1970–1971)
1970	Eastern Illinois	2–8			
1971	Eastern Illinois	4–6			
Eastern Illinois:		18–43–2	4–11–1		
Total:		45–70–6			
