= 1966 State College of Iowa Panthers football team =

American college football season

1966 State College of Iowa Panthers football
- Conference: North Central Conference
- Record: 4–5 (4–2 NCC)
- Head coach: Stan Sheriff (7th season)
- Home stadium: O. R. Latham Stadium

1966 North Central Conference football standings
| | Conf. | | | | | Overall |
| Team | W | | L | | T | W | | L | | T |
|---|---|---|---|---|---|---|---|---|---|---|
| North Dakota + | 5 | – | 1 | – | 0 | 8 | – | 2 | – | 0 |
| North Dakota State + | 5 | – | 1 | – | 0 | 8 | – | 2 | – | 0 |
| State College of Iowa | 4 | – | 2 | – | 0 | 4 | – | 5 | – | 0 |
| Augustana (SD) | 2 | – | 4 | – | 0 | 5 | – | 4 | – | 0 |
| South Dakota | 2 | – | 4 | – | 0 | 5 | – | 5 | – | 0 |
| South Dakota State | 2 | – | 4 | – | 0 | 3 | – | 7 | – | 0 |
| Morningside | 1 | – | 5 | – | 0 | 3 | – | 6 | – | 0 |
$ – Conference champion

The 1966 State College of Iowa Panthers football team represented the State College of Iowa (later renamed University of Northern Iowa) as a member of the North Central Conference (NCC) during the 1966 NCAA College Division football season. In its seventh season under head coach Stan Sheriff, the team compiled a 4–5 record (4–2 in conference games) and finished in third place in the NCC.

Three S.C.I. players were named to the all-NCC team: halfback Terry Fox; guard Ray Pedersen; and end Rick Price.

The team played its home games at O. R. Latham Stadium in Cedar Falls, Iowa.

== Schedule ==
| Date | Opponent | Site | Result | Attendance | Source |
|---|---|---|---|---|---|
| September 10 | at Northern Michigan* | Marquette, MI | L 0–21 | 3,000 | |
| September 24 | Drake* | O. R. Latham Stadium; Cedar Falls, IA | L 6–9 | 7,000 | |
| October 1 | at North Dakota | Memorial Stadium; Grand Forks, ND | L 10–23 | 5,592 | |
| October 8 | Augustana (SD) | O. R. Latham Stadium; Cedar Falls, IA | W 28–7 | | |
| October 15 | at Southern Illinois* | McAndrew Stadium; Carbondale, IL | L 7–30 | | |
| October 22 | Morningside | O. R. Latham Stadium; Cedar Falls, IA | W 2–0 | 7,800 | |
| October 29 | South Dakota State | O. R. Latham Stadium; Cedar Falls, IA | W 13–7 | 3,500 | |
| November 5 | at South Dakota | Inman Field; Vermillion, SD | L 14–30 | 3,585 | |
| November 12 | North Dakota State | O. R. Latham Stadium; Cedar Falls, IA | W 41–14 | 5,500 | |
*Non-conference game
