= 1963 Milwaukee Cardinals football team =

American college football season

1963 Milwaukee Cardinals football
- Conference: Wisconsin State College Conference
- Record: 1–6–1 (1–4–1 WSCC)
- Head coach: Wally Dreyer (4th season)
- Home stadium: Shorewood Stadium; Pearse Field

1963 Wisconsin State College Conference football standings
	Conf.					Overall
Team	W		L		T	W		L		T
No. 13 Eau Claire State $	6	–	0	–	0	7	–	0	–	0
Stevens Point State	6	–	1	–	0	6	–	2	–	0
Whitewater State	5	–	2	–	0	6	–	3	–	0
Superior State	4	–	2	–	0	5	–	4	–	0
Platteville State	3	–	3	–	0	3	–	5	–	0
River Falls State	3	–	3	–	1	4	–	3	–	2
Stout State	2	–	4	–	1	2	–	5	–	1
Milwaukee	1	–	4	–	1	1	–	6	–	1
Oshkosh State	0	–	5	–	2	0	–	5	–	2
La Crosse State	0	–	6	–	1	0	–	8	–	1
$ – Conference champion; Rankings from NAIA poll

The 1963 Milwaukee Cardinals football team represented the University of Wisconsin–Milwaukee as a member of the Wisconsin State College Conference (WSCC) during the 1963 NAIA football season. Led by Wally Dreyer in his fourth season as head coach, Milwaukee compiled a record of 1–6–1, with a record in conference of 1–4–1, and finished eighth in the WSCC.

== Schedule ==
Date	Opponent	Site	Result	Source
September 14	Ferris State*	Shorewood Stadium; Shorewood, WI	L 6–18	
September 21	Oshkosh State	Shorewood Stadium; Shorewood, WI	T 0–0	
September 27	at La Crosse State	Memorial Stadium; La Crosse, WI	W 12–7	
October 5	River Falls State	Shorewood Stadium; Shorewood, WI	L 9–12	
October 12	at Stevens Point State	Goerke Field; Stevens Point, WI	L 7–34	
October 19	at Whitewater State	Hamilton Field; Whitewater, WI	L 2–57	
October 26	Platteville State^{†}	Pearse Field; Milwaukee, WI	L 6–20	
November 2	at Michigan Tech*	Hubbell Field; Houghton, MI	L 0–20	
*Non-conference game; ^{†}Homecoming; Source:
