= 1966 Cal State Hayward Pioneers football team =

American college football season

1966 Cal State Hayward Pioneers football
- Conference: Far Western Conference
- Record: 2–8 (1–5 FWC)
- Head coach: Les Davis (1st season)
- Home stadium: Pioneer Stadium

1966 Far Western Conference football standings
	Conf.					Overall
Team	W		L		T	W		L		T
Sacramento State $	6	–	0	–	0	8	–	2	–	0
San Francisco State	5	–	1	–	0	7	–	3	–	0
Nevada	3	–	3	–	0	6	–	3	–	0
UC Davis	3	–	3	–	0	5	–	5	–	0
Humboldt State	2	–	4	–	0	4	–	6	–	0
Chico State	1	–	5	–	0	4	–	6	–	0
Cal State Hayward	1	–	5	–	0	2	–	8	–	0
$ – Conference champion

The 1966 Cal State Hayward Pioneers football team represented California State College at Hayward—now known California State University, East Bay—as a member of the Far Western Conference (FWC) during the 1966 NCAA College Division football season. Led by first-year head coach Les Davis, Cal State Hayward compiled an overall record of 2–8 with a mark of 1–5 in conference play, tying for sixth place in the FWC. The team was outscored by its opponents 255 to 110 for the season. The Pioneers played home games at Pioneer Stadium in Hayward, California.

== Schedule ==
Date	Opponent	Site	Result	Attendance	Source
September 24	at Southern Oregon*	Fuller Field; Ashland, OR	L 8–34		
October 1	at Humboldt State	Redwood Bowl; Arcata, CA	W 33–14	3,500	
October 8	Sacramento State	Pioneer Stadium; Hayward, CA	L 6–38	1,500	
October 15	at Oregon Tech*	Klamath Falls, OR	W 13–12		
October 22	at UC Davis	Toomey Field; Davis, CA	L 14–27	3,400	
October 29	San Francisco State	Pioneer Stadium; Hayward, CA	L 12–21	1,800	
November 5	Nevada	Pioneer Stadium; Hayward, CA	L 0–24	1,800	
November 12	at Chico State	College Field; Chico, CA	L 6–28	3,500	
November 19	San Francisco*	Pioneer Stadium; Hayward, CA	L 0–20	200	
November 26	Redlands*	Pioneer Stadium; Hayward, CA	L 18–37	1,000	
*Non-conference game
