= 1966 Montana State Bobcats football team =

American college football season

1966 Montana State Bobcats football

Big Sky champion

Camellia Bowl, L 7–28 vs. San Diego State
- Conference: Big Sky Conference
- Record: 8–3 (4–0 Big Sky)
- Head coach: Jim Sweeney (4th season)
- Home stadium: Gatton Field

1966 Big Sky Conference football standings
	Conf.					Overall
Team	W		L		T	W		L		T
Montana State $^	4	–	0	–	0	8	–	3	–	0
Idaho	3	–	1	–	0	4	–	6	–	0
Weber State	2	–	2	–	0	6	–	3	–	0
Idaho State	1	–	3	–	0	3	–	6	–	0
Montana	0	–	4	–	0	1	–	8	–	0
$ – Conference champion

The 1966 Montana State Bobcats football team was an American football team that represented Montana State University in the Big Sky Conference during the 1966 NCAA College Division football season. In its fourth season under head coach Jim Sweeney, the team compiled an 8–3 record (4–0 against Big Sky opponents) and won the conference championship.

== Schedule ==
Date	Opponent	Rank	Site	Result	Attendance	Source
September 10	vs. South Dakota State*		Memorial Stadium; Great Falls, MT	W 41–6	5,500	
September 17	at Portland State*		Wilson High School Stadium; Portland, OR	W 50–7	2,100	
September 24	Idaho	No. 5	Gatton Field; Bozeman, MT	W 24–10	9,500	
October 1	Fresno State*	No. 3	Gatton Field; Bozeman, MT	W 55–6	9,100	
October 8	at No. 1 North Dakota State*	No. 2	Dacotah Field; Fargo, ND	L 23–35	8,100–8,500	
October 15	Idaho State	No. 7	Gatton Field; Bozeman, MT	W 49–0	7,200	
October 22	No. 7 Weber State^{†}	No. 6	Gatton Field; Bozeman, MT	W 45–36	9,000–9,600	
October 29	at No. 4 North Dakota*	No. 3	Memorial Stadium; Grand Forks, ND	W 59–21	4,100–4,137	
November 5	at Montana	No. 3	Dornblaser Field; Missoula, MT (rivalry)	W 38–0	8,500	
November 12	at Tulsa*	No. 3	Skelly Stadium; Tulsa, OK	L 10–13	24,055	
December 10	vs. No. 1 San Diego State*	No. 3	Charles C. Hughes Stadium; Sacramento, CA (Camellia Bowl)	L 7–28	15,740	
*Non-conference game; ^{†}Homecoming; Rankings from AP Poll released prior to the game
