= 1966 Ball State Cardinals football team =

American college football season

1966 Ball State Cardinals football

ICC champion
- Conference: Indiana Collegiate Conference
- Record: 7–1–1 (5–0–1 ICC)
- Head coach: Ray Louthen (5th season)
- Home stadium: Ball State Field

1966 Indiana Collegiate Conference football standings
	Conf.					Overall
Team	W		L		T	W		L		T
Ball State $	5	–	0	–	1	7	–	0	–	1
Indiana State	4	–	2	–	0	6	–	2	–	0
Butler	4	–	2	–	0	4	–	5	–	0
Saint Joseph's (IN)	3	–	3	–	0	4	–	4	–	0
Evansville	2	–	3	–	1	4	–	4	–	1
DePauw	1	–	5	–	0	3	–	6	–	0
Valparaiso	1	–	5	–	0	3	–	6	–	0
$ – Conference champion

The 1966 Ball State Cardinals football team was an American football team that represented Ball State University in the Indiana Collegiate Conference (ICC) during the 1966 NCAA College Division football season. In its fifth season under head coach Ray Louthen, the team compiled a 7–1–1 record.

== Schedule ==
Date	Opponent	Site	Result	Attendance	Source
September 17	at IUP*	Indiana, PA	W 20–7	6,600	
September 24	Valparaiso	Muncie, IN	W 20–7	11,500	
October 1	at Evansville	Evansville, IN	T 21–21	2,800	
October 8	Northern Illinois*	Muncie, IN (rivalry)	L 24–38	7,550–7,853	
October 15	DePauw	Muncie, IN	W 30–15	12,600	
October 22	at Butler	Indianapolis, IN	W 17–14	11,800	
October 29	Indiana State	Muncie, IN (Blue Key Victory Bell)	W 31–20	7,100	
November 5	at Saint Joseph's (IN)	Rensselaer, IN	W 29–16	3,857	
November 12	at Southern Illinois	Carbondale, IL	W 15–14	5,000	
*Non-conference game
