= 1966 Western Kentucky Hilltoppers football team =

American college football season

1966 Western Kentucky Hilltoppers football
- Conference: Ohio Valley Conference
- Record: 5–5 (3–4 OVC)
- Head coach: Nick Denes (9th season)
- Captain: Jack Crangle

1966 Ohio Valley Conference football standings
	Conf.					Overall
Team	W		L		T	W		L		T
Morehead State $	6	–	1	–	0	7	–	2	–	0
Middle Tennessee	5	–	2	–	0	7	–	3	–	0
Austin Peay	4	–	3	–	0	6	–	4	–	0
No. 16 Eastern Kentucky	4	–	3	–	0	7	–	3	–	0
Tennessee Tech	4	–	3	–	0	5	–	5	–	0
Western Kentucky	3	–	4	–	0	5	–	5	–	0
East Tennessee State	2	–	5	–	0	3	–	6	–	0
Murray State	0	–	7	–	0	0	–	10	–	0
$ – Conference champion; Rankings from UPI small college poll

The 1966 Western Kentucky Hilltoppers football team represented Western Kentucky University as a member of the Ohio Valley Conference (OVC) during the 1966 NCAA College Division football season. Led by ninth-year head coach Nick Denes, the Hilltoppers compiled an overall record of 5–5 with a mark of 3–4 in conference play, for sixth place in the OVC. The team's captain was Jack Crangle.

== Schedule ==
Date	Opponent	Site	Result	Attendance	Source
September 17	Saint Joseph's (IN)*	Bowling Green, KY	W 42–21	6,000–7,047	
September 24	at East Tennessee State	Johnson City, TN	W 24–7	7,100	
October 1	No. T–10 Middle Tennessee	Bowling Green, KY (rivalry)	L 9–33	7,994–10,000	
October 8	Austin Peay	Bowling Green, KY	W 7–3	7,000–7,584	
October 15	at Tennessee Tech	Cookeville, TN	L 14–21	5,000–7,500	
October 22	Drake*	Bowling Green, KY	L 21–37	4,000	
October 29	Eastern Kentucky^{†}	Bowling Green, KY (rivalry)	L 12–24	12,500–12,625	
November 5	at Morehead State	Jayne Stadium; Morehead, KY	L 7–12	5,000	
November 12	Butler*	Bowling Green, KY	W 35–7	5,000–5,740	
November 19	at Murray State	Cutchin Stadium; Murray, KY (rivalry)	W 37–20	2,500–4,100	
*Non-conference game; ^{†}Homecoming; Rankings from AP Poll released prior to the game
