= 1966 Central Michigan Chippewas football team =

American college football season

1966 Central Michigan Chippewas football

IIAC champion
- Conference: Interstate Intercollegiate Athletic Conference
- Record: 5–5 (3–0 IIAC)
- Head coach: Kenneth Kelly (16th season)
- MVP: Paul Verska
- Home stadium: Alumni Field

1966 Interstate Intercollegiate Athletic Conference football standings
	Conf.					Overall
Team	W		L		T	W		L		T
Central Michigan $	3	–	0	–	0	5	–	5	–	0
Eastern Illinois	1	–	1	–	1	1	–	6	–	1
Western Illinois	1	–	2	–	0	1	–	7	–	1
Illinois State	0	–	2	–	1	2	–	5	–	2
$ – Conference champion

The 1966 Central Michigan Chippewas football team represented Central Michigan University in the Interstate Intercollegiate Athletic Conference (IIAC) during the 1966 NCAA College Division football season. In their 16th and final season under head coach Kenneth Kelly, the Chippewas compiled a 5–5 record (3–0 against IIAC opponents), lost five straight games to start the season, won five straight to end the season, won the IIAC championship, and outscored all opponents by a combined total of 213 to 159.

The team's statistical leaders included quarterback Bob Miles with 5,000 passing yards, Bob Rosso with 662 rushing yards, and Wally Hempton with 574 receiving yards. Miles also threw a school record 17 interceptions in 1966. Offensive guard Paul Verska received the team's most valuable player award. End Greg Hoefler set a school record (since broken) with 187 receiving yards against Wayne State on November 19, 1966. Ten Central Michigan players (Miles, Rosso, Hoefler, Veska, defensive guard Chuck Barker, halfbacks Bob Foldesi and Don Krueger, defensive end Mark Maksimovicz, tackle Mike Pintek, and defensive tackle Bill Sinkule) received first-team honors on the All-IIAC team.

Coach Kelly retired as Central Michigan's head football coach at the end of the 1966 season after 16 years in the position. He compiled a 91–58–2 record as the head football coach at Central Michigan.

== Schedule ==
Date	Opponent	Site	Result	Attendance	Source
September 10	vs. Whitewater State*	Saginaw, MI (Red Feather game)	L 16–40	8,200–9,000	
September 17	Youngstown State*	Alumni Field; Mount Pleasant, MI	L 6–7	9,000	
September 24	at Western Michigan*	Waldo Stadium; Kalamazoo, MI (rivalry)	L 14–31	17,000–17,500	
October 1	at Northern Illinois*	Huskie Stadium; DeKalb, IL	L 13–20	8,343–8,500	
October 8	Northern Michigan*	Alumni Field; Mount Pleasant, MI	L 14–35	8,500	
October 15	at Hillsdale*	Hillsdale, MI	W 28–7	2,500	
October 22	Illinois State^{†}	Alumni Field; Mount Pleasant, MI	W 20–6	11,500	
October 29	Western Illinois	Alumni Field; Mount Pleasant, MI	W 28–3	6,000	
November 5	at Eastern Illinois	Lincoln Field; Charleston, IL	W 30–10	4,000	
November 19	Wayne State (MI)*	Alumni Field; Mount Pleasant, MI	W 44–0	1,000	
*Non-conference game; ^{†}Homecoming
