= 1966 Chico State Wildcats football team =

American college football season

1966 Chico State Wildcats football
- Conference: Far Western Conference
- Record: 4–6 (1–5 FWC)
- Head coach: George Maderos (9th season)
- Home stadium: College Field

1966 Far Western Conference football standings
	Conf.					Overall
Team	W		L		T	W		L		T
Sacramento State $	6	–	0	–	0	8	–	2	–	0
San Francisco State	5	–	1	–	0	7	–	3	–	0
Nevada	3	–	3	–	0	6	–	3	–	0
UC Davis	3	–	3	–	0	5	–	5	–	0
Humboldt State	2	–	4	–	0	4	–	6	–	0
Chico State	1	–	5	–	0	4	–	6	–	0
Cal State Hayward	1	–	5	–	0	2	–	8	–	0
$ – Conference champion

The 1966 Chico State Wildcats football team represented Chico State College—now known as California State University, Chico—as a member of the Far Western Conference (FWC) during the 1966 NCAA College Division football season. Led by ninth-year head coach George Maderos, Chico State compiled an overall record of 4–6 with a mark of 1–5 in conference play, tying for sixth place in the FWC. The team was outscored by its opponents 247 to 236 for the season. The Wildcats played home games at College Field in Chico, California.

== Schedule ==
Date	Opponent	Site	Result	Attendance	Source
September 17	at San Francisco*	Kezar Stadium; San Francisco, CA	L 7–20	3,000	
September 24	Redlands*	College Field; Chico, CA	W 28–24	4,200	
October 1	at Southern Oregon*	Fuller Field; Ashland, OR	W 39–16	3,200	
October 8	at Humboldt State	Redwood Bowl; Arcata, CA	L 28–29	4,500	
October 15	UC Davis	College Field; Chico, CA	L 13–42	5,700	
October 22	at San Francisco State	Cox Stadium; San Francisco, CA	L 13–39	3,100–3,300	
October 29	Nevada	College Field; Chico, CA	L 31–41	3,500	
November 5	Oregon Tech*	College Field; Chico, CA	W 49–0	4,000	
November 12	Cal State Hayward	College Field; Chico, CA	W 28–6	3,500	
November 19	at Sacramento State	Charles C. Hughes Stadium; Sacramento, CA	L 0–30	1,843–2,000	
*Non-conference game
