= 1966 UC Davis Aggies football team =

American college football season

1966 UC Davis Aggies football
- Conference: Far Western Conference
- Record: 5–5 (3–3 FWC)
- Head coach: Herb Schmalenberger (4th season)
- Captains: Paul Fiack; Dick South
- Home stadium: Toomey Field

1966 Far Western Conference football standings
	Conf.					Overall
Team	W		L		T	W		L		T
Sacramento State $	6	–	0	–	0	8	–	2	–	0
San Francisco State	5	–	1	–	0	7	–	3	–	0
Nevada	3	–	3	–	0	6	–	3	–	0
UC Davis	3	–	3	–	0	5	–	5	–	0
Humboldt State	2	–	4	–	0	4	–	6	–	0
Chico State	1	–	5	–	0	4	–	6	–	0
Cal State Hayward	1	–	5	–	0	2	–	8	–	0
$ – Conference champion

The 1966 UC Davis Aggies football team represented the University of California, Davis as a member of the Far Western Conference (FWC) during the 1966 NCAA College Division football season. Led by fourth-year head coach Herb Schmalenberger, the Aggies compiled an overall record of 5–5 with a mark of 3–3 in conference play, tying for third place in the FWC. The team was outscored by its opponents 218 to 200 for the season. The Aggies played home games at Toomey Field in Davis, California.

The UC Davis sports teams were commonly called the "Cal Aggies" from 1924 until the mid 1970s.

== Schedule ==
Date	Opponent	Site	Result	Attendance	Source
September 17	at Santa Clara*	Buck Shaw Stadium; Santa Clara, CA	L 7–34	5,800	
September 24	UC Riverside*	Toomey Field; Davis, CA	W 27–7	3,000	
October 1	at Whittier*	Hadley Field; Whittier, CA	W 10–7	600	
October 8	Nevada	Toomey Field; Davis, CA	L 10–26	4,800	
October 15	at Chico State	College Field; Chico, CA	W 42–13	5,700	
October 22	Cal State Hayward	Toomey Field; Davis, CA	W 27–14	3,400	
October 29	at Sacramento State	Charles C. Hughes Stadium; Sacramento, CA (rivalry)	L 24–36	4,919	
November 5	Humboldt State	Toomey Field; Davis, CA	W 34–29	5,100	
November 12	at Cal Poly Pomona*	Kellogg Field; Pomona, CA	L 13–35	1,500–2,200	
November 19	at San Francisco State	Cox Stadium; San Francisco, CA	L 6–17	600–750	
*Non-conference game
