= Dick Arndt =

American football player (born 1944)

No. 71
- Position: Defensive tackle

Personal information
- Born: March 12, 1944 (age 82); Bonners Ferry, Idaho, U.S.
- Listed height: 6 ft 5 in (1.96 m)
- Listed weight: 265 lb (120 kg)

Career information
- High school: Sandpoint (ID)
- College: Stanford (1962); Idaho (1964–1966)
- NFL draft: 1966: 5th round, 77th overall pick
- AFL draft: 1966: Red Shirt 3rd round, 21st overall pick

Career history
- Pittsburgh Steelers (1967–1970); Washington Redskins (1971)*; New England Patriots (1972)*
- * Offseason or practice squad member only

Career NFL statistics
- Sacks: 2
- Stats at Pro Football Reference

Richard Lee Arndt (born March 12, 1944) is an American former professional football player who was a defensive tackle for four seasons with the Pittsburgh Steelers of the National Football League (NFL).

Born and raised in northern Idaho, Arndt graduated from Sandpoint High School in 1962 and played college football at Stanford, then transferred to Idaho. A future pick in the 1966 NFL draft, he was selected in the fifth round (77th overall) by the Los Angeles Rams, but stayed in college and turned pro after the 1966 season.

The Rams traded the rights to Arndt along with quarterback Ron Smith and a second round draft pick to the Green Bay Packers for running back Tom Moore. Arndt worked out at offensive guard and tackle before switching to defensive tackle in the Packers' 1967 training camp before the Packers traded Arndt to the Pittsburgh Steelers for a fourth round draft pick prior to the start of the season. For the Steelers, Arndt played in all 14 games in '67, three in '68 and '69 and all 14 games again in 1970. Cut in 1971, Arndt tried out for the Washington Redskins that season and New England Patriots the following season before retiring from the NFL.
