= 1966 South Dakota Coyotes football team =

American college football season

1966 South Dakota Coyotes football
- Conference: North Central Conference
- Record: 5–5 (2–4 NCC)
- Head coach: Joe Salem (1st season)
- Home stadium: Inman Field

1966 North Central Conference football standings
	Conf.					Overall
Team	W		L		T	W		L		T
North Dakota +	5	–	1	–	0	8	–	2	–	0
North Dakota State +	5	–	1	–	0	8	–	2	–	0
State College of Iowa	4	–	2	–	0	4	–	5	–	0
Augustana (SD)	2	–	4	–	0	5	–	4	–	0
South Dakota	2	–	4	–	0	5	–	5	–	0
South Dakota State	2	–	4	–	0	3	–	7	–	0
Morningside	1	–	5	–	0	3	–	6	–	0
$ – Conference champion

The 1966 South Dakota Coyotes football team was an American football team that represented the University of South Dakota in the North Central Conference (NCC) during the 1966 NCAA College Division football season. In its first season under head coach Joe Salem, the team compiled a 5–5 record (2–4 against NCC opponents), finished in a three-way tie for fourth place out of seven teams in the NCC, and outscored opponents by a total of 225 to 160. The team played its home games at Inman Field in Vermillion, South Dakota.

== Schedule ==
Date	Opponent	Site	Result	Attendance	Source
September 10	vs. Colorado State–Greeley*	O'Hara Field; Rapid City, SD	W 27–12	3,000	
September 17	Wayne State (NE)*	Inman Field; Vermillion, SD	W 40–6	4,004	
September 24	Montana*	Inman Field; Vermillion, SD	W 21–7	3,937–5,000	
October 1	at Augustana (SD)	Howard Wood Field; Sioux Falls, SD	L 20–24	8,000	
October 8	at No. 3 North Dakota	Memorial Stadium; Grand Forks, ND (Sitting Bull Trophy)	L 17–31	4,670–5,107	
October 15	at Morningside	Sioux City, IA	W 38–0	5,600	
October 22	South Dakota State	Inman Field; Vermillion, SD (rivalry)	L 18–22	9,500	
October 29	No. 1 North Dakota State	Inman Field; Vermillion, SD	L 0–13	4,067	
November 5	State College of Iowa	Inman Field; Vermillion, SD	W 30–14	3,585	
November 12	at Drake*	Drake Stadium; Des Moines, IA	L 14–31	3,300	
*Non-conference game; Rankings from AP Poll released prior to the game
