= 1966 Northern Illinois Huskies football team =

American college football season

1966 Northern Illinois Huskies football
- Conference: Independent
- Record: 8–2
- Head coach: Howard Fletcher (11th season)
- Offensive coordinator: Bill Peck (2nd season)
- MVP: Dan Meyer
- Captains: Dan Meyer; Joseph Bertone
- Home stadium: Huskie Stadium

1966 NCAA College Division independents football records
	Conf.			Overall
Team	W	L	T	W		L		T
St. Norbert		–		7	–	1	–	1
Parsons		–		9	–	2	–	0
Drake		–		8	–	2	–	0
Northern Illinois		–		8	–	2	–	0
Indiana (PA)		–		7	–	2	–	0
Santa Clara		–		7	–	2	–	0
Cortland		–		6	–	2	–	0
Northeastern		–		6	–	2	–	0
Akron		–		6	–	3	–	0
Northern Michigan		–		6	–	3	–	1
Samford		–		6	–	3	–	1
Carnegie Tech		–		5	–	3	–	0
Eastern Michigan		–		5	–	3	–	1
Ashland		–		5	–	3	–	2
Northern Arizona		–		6	–	4	–	0
UC Santa Barbara		–		6	–	4	–	0
Wheaton (IL)		–		5	–	4	–	0
Boston University		–		5	–	5	–	0
Cal Poly Pomona		–		5	–	5	–	0
Chattanooga		–		5	–	5	–	0
Colorado College		–		4	–	4	–	0
Wabash		–		4	–	4	–	1
Milwaukee		–		4	–	5	–	1
Southern Illinois		–		4	–	5	–	1
UC Riverside		–		4	–	5	–	0
Tampa		–		4	–	5	–	0
Rose Poly		–		3	–	4	–	1
Hawaii		–		4	–	6	–	0
Portland State		–		4	–	6	–	0
Lake Forest		–		2	–	5	–	0
Wayne State (MI)		–		2	–	6	–	0
Mississippi Valley State		–		2	–	7	–	0

The 1966 Northern Illinois Huskies football team represented Northern Illinois University as independent during the 1966 NCAA College Division football season. Led by 11th-year head coach Howard Fletcher, the Huskies compiled a record of 8–2. Northern Illinois played home games at Huskie Stadium in DeKalb, Illinois.

== Schedule ==
Date	Opponent	Site	Result	Attendance	Source
September 17	Butler	Huskie Stadium; DeKalb, IL	W 34–6	14,872	
September 24	Kent State	Huskie Stadium; DeKalb, IL	L 7–26	13,129–18,000	
October 1	Central Michigan	Huskie Stadium; DeKalb, IL	W 20–13	8,343–8,500	
October 8	at Ball State	Muncie, IN (rivalry)	W 38–24	7,550–7,853	
October 15	Bradley	Huskie Stadium; DeKalb, IL	W 49–18	14,040	
October 22	at Hillsdale	Hillsdale, MI	W 14–7	3,400	
October 29	Akron	Huskie Stadium; DeKalb, IL	W 31–18	18,921	
November 5	at Illinois State	Hancock Stadium; Normal, IL	L 8–27	4,587	
November 12	at Western Illinois	Hanson Field; Macomb, IL	W 44–6	9,500	
November 19	Milwaukee	Huskie Stadium; DeKalb, IL	W 48–8	6,637	
