= 1966 Indiana State Sycamores football team =

American college football season

1966 Indiana State Sycamores football
- Conference: Indiana Collegiate Conference
- Record: 6–2 (4–2 ICC)
- Head coach: Jerry Huntsman (1st season)
- Home stadium: Memorial Stadium

1966 Indiana Collegiate Conference football standings
	Conf.					Overall
Team	W		L		T	W		L		T
Ball State $	5	–	0	–	1	7	–	0	–	1
Indiana State	4	–	2	–	0	6	–	2	–	0
Butler	4	–	2	–	0	4	–	5	–	0
Saint Joseph's (IN)	3	–	3	–	0	4	–	4	–	0
Evansville	2	–	3	–	1	4	–	4	–	1
DePauw	1	–	5	–	0	3	–	6	–	0
Valparaiso	1	–	5	–	0	3	–	6	–	0
$ – Conference champion

The 1966 Indiana State Sycamores football team represented Indiana State University as a member of the Indiana Collegiate Conference (ICC) during the 1966 NCAA College Division football season. Led by first-year head coach Jerry Huntsman, the Sycamores compiled an overall record of 6–2 with a mark of 4–2 in conference play, tying for second place in the ICC.

The Sycamores were represented on the All-Conference team by: John Truitt, Senior, WR, Joe Fiedler, Senior, Center, Randy Payne, Junior, Halfback and Rob Pychinka, Linebacker. Ron Overton, Sophomore, Quarterback & Dean Klink, Sophomore, Fullback were named to the Conference Honorable Mention team.

== Schedule ==
Date	Time	Opponent	Site	Result	Attendance	Source
September 17	2:00 pm	at Eastern Illinois*	Lincoln Field; Charleston, IL	W 32–0	2,000–3,500	
September 24	2:00 pm	at Butler	Butler Bowl; Indianapolis, IN	L 6–28	7,100	
October 1	8:00 pm	Illinois State*	Memorial Stadium; Terre Haute, IN	W 25–6	3,900	
October 8	2:00 pm	Saint Joseph's (IN)^{†}	Memorial Stadium; Terre Haute, IN	W 19–0	10,750	
October 15	2:00 pm	at Valparaiso	Brown Field; Valparaiso, IN	W 19–16	6,000	
October 22	2:00 pm	Evansville	Memorial Stadium; Terre Haute, IN	W 20–18	4,500	
October 29	2:00 pm	at Ball State	ISU Muncee Stadium; Muncee, IN	L 20–31	7,100	
November 5	2:00 pm	DePauw	Memorial Stadium; Terre Haute, IN	W 30–8	3,500	
*Non-conference game; ^{†}Homecoming; All times are in Central time
