= 1966 Southern Illinois Salukis football team =

American college football season

1966 Southern Illinois Salukis football
- Conference: Independent
- Record: 4–5–1
- Head coach: Ellis Rainsberger (1st season)
- Home stadium: McAndrew Stadium

1966 NCAA College Division independents football records
	Conf.			Overall
Team	W	L	T	W		L		T
St. Norbert		–		7	–	1	–	1
Parsons		–		9	–	2	–	0
Drake		–		8	–	2	–	0
Northern Illinois		–		8	–	2	–	0
Indiana (PA)		–		7	–	2	–	0
Santa Clara		–		7	–	2	–	0
Cortland		–		6	–	2	–	0
Northeastern		–		6	–	2	–	0
Akron		–		6	–	3	–	0
Northern Michigan		–		6	–	3	–	1
Samford		–		6	–	3	–	1
Carnegie Tech		–		5	–	3	–	0
Eastern Michigan		–		5	–	3	–	1
Ashland		–		5	–	3	–	2
Northern Arizona		–		6	–	4	–	0
UC Santa Barbara		–		6	–	4	–	0
Wheaton (IL)		–		5	–	4	–	0
Boston University		–		5	–	5	–	0
Cal Poly Pomona		–		5	–	5	–	0
Chattanooga		–		5	–	5	–	0
Colorado College		–		4	–	4	–	0
Wabash		–		4	–	4	–	1
Milwaukee		–		4	–	5	–	1
Southern Illinois		–		4	–	5	–	1
UC Riverside		–		4	–	5	–	0
Tampa		–		4	–	5	–	0
Rose Poly		–		3	–	4	–	1
Hawaii		–		4	–	6	–	0
Portland State		–		4	–	6	–	0
Lake Forest		–		2	–	5	–	0
Wayne State (MI)		–		2	–	6	–	0
Mississippi Valley State		–		2	–	7	–	0

The 1966 Southern Illinois Salukis football team was an American football team that represented Southern Illinois University (now known as Southern Illinois University Carbondale) as an independent during the 1966 NCAA College Division football season. Under first-year head coach Ellis Rainsberger, the team compiled a 4–5–1 record. The team played its home games at McAndrew Stadium in Carbondale, Illinois.

== Schedule ==
Date	Opponent	Site	Result	Attendance	Source
September 17	Wichita State	McAndrew Stadium; Carbondale, IL	W 17–7	6,000	
September 24	Louisville	McAndrew Stadium; Carbondale, IL	L 7–16	10,000–10,500	
October 1	at Drake	Drake Stadium; Des Moines, IA	L 7–30	8,600	
October 8	Youngstown State	McAndrew Stadium; Carbondale, IL	T 21–21	6,500	
October 15	at State College of Iowa	O. R. Latham Stadium; Cedar Falls, IA	W 30–7	5,000	
October 22	at North Texas State	Fouts Field; Denton, TX	L 6–53	9,000	
October 29	East Carolina^{†}	McAndrew Stadium; Carbondale, IL	W 31–13	14,000	
November 5	at Northern Michigan	Memorial Field; Marquette, MI	L 0–34	3,500	
November 12	Ball State	McAndrew Stadium; Carbondale, IL	L 14–15	5,000	
November 19	at Southwest Missouri State	SMS Stadium; Springfield, MO	W 19–0	2,500	
^{†}Homecoming
