= 1966 North Dakota Fighting Sioux football team =

American college football season

1966 North Dakota Fighting Sioux football

NCC co-champion Pecan Bowl champion

Pecan Bowl, W 42–14 vs. Parsons
- Conference: North Central Conference
- Record: 8–2 (5–1 NCC)
- Head coach: Marvin C. Helling (9th season)
- Home stadium: Memorial Stadium

1966 North Central Conference football standings
	Conf.					Overall
Team	W		L		T	W		L		T
North Dakota +	5	–	1	–	0	8	–	2	–	0
North Dakota State +	5	–	1	–	0	8	–	2	–	0
State College of Iowa	4	–	2	–	0	4	–	5	–	0
Augustana (SD)	2	–	4	–	0	5	–	4	–	0
South Dakota	2	–	4	–	0	5	–	5	–	0
South Dakota State	2	–	4	–	0	3	–	7	–	0
Morningside	1	–	5	–	0	3	–	6	–	0
$ – Conference champion

The 1966 North Dakota Fighting Sioux football team, also known as the Nodaks, was an American football team that represented the University of North Dakota in the North Central Conference (NCC) during the 1966 NCAA College Division football season. In its ninth year under head coach Marvin C. Helling, the team compiled an 8–2 record (5–1 against NCC opponents), tied with North Dakota State for the NCC championship, defeated Parsons in the Pecan Bowl, and outscored opponents by a total of 338 to 154. The team played its home games at Memorial Stadium in Grand Forks, North Dakota.

== Schedule ==
Date	Opponent	Rank	Site	Result	Attendance	Source
September 17	vs. Montana*		Daylis Stadium; Billings, MT	W 30–6	5,400–6,000	
September 24	Idaho State*	No. 3	Memorial Stadium; Grand Forks, ND	W 41–0	8,300–8,570	
October 1	State College of Iowa	No. 2	Memorial Stadium; Grand Forks, ND	W 23–10	5,592	
October 8	South Dakota	No. 3	Memorial Stadium; Grand Forks, ND (Sitting Bull Trophy)	W 31–17	4,670–5,107	
October 15	at South Dakota State	No. 2	Coughlin–Alumni Stadium; Brookings, SD	W 43–0	6,400	
October 22	No. 1 North Dakota State	No. 2	Memorial Stadium; Grand Forks, ND (Nickel Trophy)	L 15–18	14,275	
October 29	No. 3 Montana State*	No. 4	Memorial Stadium; Grand Forks, ND	L 21–59	4,100–4,137	
November 5	at Augustana (SD)		Howard Wood Field; Sioux Falls, SD	W 30–20	3,208	
November 12	at Morningside	No. 9	Sioux City, IA	W 62–0	1,340	
December 10	vs. No. 5 Parsons*	No. 8	Shotwell Stadium; Abilene, TX (Pecan Bowl)	W 42–24		
*Non-conference game; Rankings from AP Poll released prior to the game
