= 1966 North Dakota State Bison football team =

American college football season

1966 North Dakota State Bison football

NCC co-champion
- Conference: North Central Conference
- Record: 8–2 (5–1 NCC)
- Head coach: Ron Erhardt (1st season)
- Home stadium: Dacotah Field

1966 North Central Conference football standings
	Conf.					Overall
Team	W		L		T	W		L		T
North Dakota +	5	–	1	–	0	8	–	2	–	0
North Dakota State +	5	–	1	–	0	8	–	2	–	0
State College of Iowa	4	–	2	–	0	4	–	5	–	0
Augustana (SD)	2	–	4	–	0	5	–	4	–	0
South Dakota	2	–	4	–	0	5	–	5	–	0
South Dakota State	2	–	4	–	0	3	–	7	–	0
Morningside	1	–	5	–	0	3	–	6	–	0
$ – Conference champion

The 1966 North Dakota State Bison football team was an American football team that represented North Dakota State University during the 1966 NCAA College Division football season as a member of the North Central Conference. In their first year under head coach Ron Erhardt, the team compiled a 8–2 record and finished as NCC co-champion.

== Schedule ==
Date	Opponent	Rank	Site	Result	Attendance	Source
September 10	at Milwaukee*		Shorewood Stadium; Shorewood, WI	W 46–6		
September 17	St. Thomas (MN)*		Dacotah Field; Fargo, ND	W 35–6		
September 24	Morningside	No. 1	Dacotah Field; Fargo, ND	W 28–14		
October 1	South Dakota State	No. 1	Dacotah Field; Fargo, ND (rivalry)	W 35–6		
October 8	Montana State*^{†}	No. 1	Dacotah Field; Fargo, ND	W 35–23	8,100–8,500	
October 15	Augustana (SD)	No. 1	Dacotah Field; Fargo, ND	W 28–0	4,500	
October 22	at No. 2 North Dakota	No. 1	Memorial Stadium; Grand Forks, ND (Nickel Trophy)	W 18–15	14,275	
October 29	at South Dakota	No. 1	Inman Field; Vermillion, SD	W 13–0	4,067	
November 5	at No. 2 San Diego State*	No. 1	Balboa Stadium; San Diego, CA	L 0–36	35,342	
November 12	at State College of Iowa	No. 2	O. R. Latham Stadium; Cedar Falls, IA	L 14–41	5,500	
*Non-conference game; ^{†}Homecoming; Rankings from AP Poll released prior to the game
