= 1966 San Francisco State Gators football team =

American college football season

1966 San Francisco State Gators football
- Conference: Far Western Conference
- Record: 7–3 (5–1 FWC)
- Head coach: Vic Rowen (6th season)
- Home stadium: Cox Stadium

1966 Far Western Conference football standings
	Conf.					Overall
Team	W		L		T	W		L		T
Sacramento State $	6	–	0	–	0	8	–	2	–	0
San Francisco State	5	–	1	–	0	7	–	3	–	0
Nevada	3	–	3	–	0	6	–	3	–	0
UC Davis	3	–	3	–	0	5	–	5	–	0
Humboldt State	2	–	4	–	0	4	–	6	–	0
Chico State	1	–	5	–	0	4	–	6	–	0
Cal State Hayward	1	–	5	–	0	2	–	8	–	0
$ – Conference champion

The 1966 San Francisco State Gators football team represented San Francisco State College—now known as San Francisco State University—as a member of the Far Western Conference (FWC) during the 1966 NCAA College Division football season. Led by sixth-year head coach Vic Rowen, San Francisco State compiled an overall record of 7–3 with a mark of 5–1 in conference play, placing second in the FWC. For the season the team outscored its opponents 235 to 134. The Gators played home games at Cox Stadium in San Francisco.

== Schedule ==
Date	Opponent	Site	Result	Attendance	Source
September 17	at Cal Poly*	Mustang Stadium; San Luis Obispo, CA	W 38–0	3,636–4,200	
September 24	at Long Beach State*	Veterans Stadium; Long Beach, CA	L 18–24	6,700	
October 1	Santa Clara*	Cox Stadium; San Francisco, CA	L 16–26	5,000	
October 8	Cal Poly Pomona*	Cox Stadium; San Francisco, CA	W 28–26	2,000–2,200	
October 15	at Nevada	Mackay Stadium; Reno, NV	W 27–0	6,000	
October 22	Chico State	Cox Stadium; San Francisco, CA	W 39–13	3,100–3,300	
October 29	at Cal State Hayward	Pioneer Stadium; Hayward, CA	W 21–12	1,800	
November 5	Sacramento State	Cox Stadium; San Francisco, CA	L 9–10	4,400	
November 12	at Humboldt State	Redwood Bowl; Arcata, CA	W 22–17	7,000	
November 19	UC Davis	Cox Stadium; San Francisco, CA	W 17–6	600–750	
*Non-conference game

== Team players in the NFL ==
The following San Francisco State players were selected in the 1967 NFL/AFL draft.

Player	Position	Round	Overall	NFL team
Elmer Collett	Guard	14	208	San Francisco 49ers
Terry Oakes	Defensive end	15	377	Chicago Bears
Lyle Baucom	Tackle	17	431	Washington Redskins
