= 1966 Montana Grizzlies football team =

American college football season

1966 Montana Grizzlies football
- Conference: Big Sky Conference
- Record: 1–8 (0–4 Big Sky)
- Head coach: Hugh Davidson (3rd season)
- Home stadium: Dornblaser Field

1966 Big Sky Conference football standings
	Conf.					Overall
Team	W		L		T	W		L		T
Montana State $^	4	–	0	–	0	8	–	3	–	0
Idaho	3	–	1	–	0	4	–	6	–	0
Weber State	2	–	2	–	0	6	–	3	–	0
Idaho State	1	–	3	–	0	3	–	6	–	0
Montana	0	–	4	–	0	1	–	8	–	0
$ – Conference champion

The 1966 Montana Grizzlies football team represented the University of Montana in the 1966 NCAA College Division football season as a member of the Big Sky Conference (Big Sky). The Grizzlies were led by third-year head coach Hugh Davidson, played their home games at Dornblaser Field, and finished the season with a record of one win and eight losses (1–8, 0–4 Big Sky).

== Schedule ==
Date	Opponent	Site	Result	Attendance	Source
September 17	vs. North Dakota*	Daylis Stadium; Billings, MT	L 6–30	5,400–6,000	
September 24	at South Dakota*	Inman Field; Vermillion, SD	L 7–21	3,937–5,000	
October 1	Portland State*	Dornblaser Field; Missoula, MT	W 10–0	6,200	
October 8	No. 9 Weber State^{†}	Dornblaser Field; Missoula, MT	L 0–28	7,000–7,500	
October 15	at Pacific (CA)*	Pacific Memorial Stadium; Stockton, CA	L 0–28	11,500	
October 22	at Idaho State	Spud Bowl; Pocatello, ID	L 14–17	5,600	
October 29	at Northern Arizona*	Lumberjack Stadium; Flagstaff, AZ	L 8–34	5,000	
November 5	No. 3 Montana State	Dornblaser Field; Missoula, MT (rivalry)	L 0–38	8,500	
November 12	at Idaho	Neale Stadium; Moscow, ID (Little Brown Stein)	L 6–40	5,500	
*Non-conference game; ^{†}Homecoming; Rankings from AP Poll released prior to the game
