= 1966 Sacramento State Hornets football team =

American college football season

1966 Sacramento State Hornets football

FWC champion
- Conference: Far Western Conference
- Record: 8–2 (6–0 FWC)
- Head coach: Ray Clemons (6th season)
- Home stadium: Charles C. Hughes Stadium

1966 Far Western Conference football standings
	Conf.					Overall
Team	W		L		T	W		L		T
Sacramento State $	6	–	0	–	0	8	–	2	–	0
San Francisco State	5	–	1	–	0	7	–	3	–	0
Nevada	3	–	3	–	0	6	–	3	–	0
UC Davis	3	–	3	–	0	5	–	5	–	0
Humboldt State	2	–	4	–	0	4	–	6	–	0
Chico State	1	–	5	–	0	4	–	6	–	0
Cal State Hayward	1	–	5	–	0	2	–	8	–	0
$ – Conference champion

The 1966 Sacramento State Hornets football team represented Sacramento State College—now known as California State University, Sacramento—as a member of the Far Western Conference (FWC) during the 1966 NCAA College Division football season. Led by sixth-year head coach Ray Clemons, Sacramento State compiled an overall record of 8–2 with a mark of 6–0 in conference play, winning the FWC title. The team outscored its opponents 205 to 102 for the season. The Hornets played home games at Charles C. Hughes Stadium in Sacramento, California.

== Schedule ==
Date	Opponent	Site	Result	Attendance	Source
September 17	at UC Santa Barbara*	Campus Stadium; Santa Barbara, CA	L 9–24	5,500–6,450	
September 24	at Santa Clara*	Buck Shaw Stadium; Santa Clara, CA	L 3–7	5,500	
October 1	Cal Poly Pomona*	Charles C. Hughes Stadium; Sacramento, CA	W 26–17	2,500–3,000	
October 8	at Cal State Hayward	Pioneer Stadium; Hayward, CA	W 38–6	1,500	
October 15	San Francisco	Charles C. Hughes Stadium; Sacramento, CA	W 23–7	3,690	
October 22	Humboldt State	Charles C. Hughes Stadium; Sacramento, CA	W 17–0	4,981	
October 29	UC Davis	Charles C. Hughes Stadium; Sacramento, CA (rivalry)	W 36–24	4,919	
November 5	at San Francisco State	Cox Stadium; San Francisco, CA	W 10–9	4,400	
November 12	at Nevada	Mackay Stadium; Reno, NV	W 13–8	6,000	
November 19	Chico State	Charles C. Hughes Stadium; Sacramento, CA	W 30–0	1,843–2,000	
*Non-conference game

== Team players in the NFL ==
The following Sacramento State players were selected in the 1967 NFL/AFL draft.

Round	Pick	Player	Position	Team
15	371	Al Nicholas	Fullback	Atlanta Falcons
