= 1966 Humboldt State Lumberjacks football team =

American college football season

1966 Humboldt State Lumberjacks football
- Conference: Far Western Conference
- Record: 4–6 (2–4 FWC)
- Head coach: Bud Van Deren (1st season)
- Home stadium: Redwood Bowl

1966 Far Western Conference football standings
	Conf.					Overall
Team	W		L		T	W		L		T
Sacramento State $	6	–	0	–	0	8	–	2	–	0
San Francisco State	5	–	1	–	0	7	–	3	–	0
Nevada	3	–	3	–	0	6	–	3	–	0
UC Davis	3	–	3	–	0	5	–	5	–	0
Humboldt State	2	–	4	–	0	4	–	6	–	0
Chico State	1	–	5	–	0	4	–	6	–	0
Cal State Hayward	1	–	5	–	0	2	–	8	–	0
$ – Conference champion

The 1966 Humboldt State Lumberjacks football team represented Humboldt State College—now known as California State Polytechnic University, Humboldt—as a member of the Far Western Conference (FWC) during the 1966 NCAA College Division football season. Led by first-year head coach Bud Van Deren, the Lumberjacks compiled an overall record of 4–6 with a mark of 2–4 in conference play, placing fifth in the FWC. The team was outscored by its opponents 210 to 144 for the season. Humboldt State played home games at the Redwood Bowl in Arcata, California.

== Schedule ==
Date	Opponent	Site	Result	Attendance	Source
September 17	Central Washington*	Redwood Bowl; Arcata, CA	W 6–2	3,000	
September 24	UBC*	Redwood Bowl; Arcata, CA	W 9–7	4,000	
October 1	Cal State Hayward	Redwood Bowl; Arcata, CA	L 14–33	3,500	
October 8	Chico State	Redwood Bowl; Arcata, CA	W 29–28	4,500	
October 15	at Hawaii*	Honolulu Stadium; Honolulu, HI	L 0–7	4,500	
October 22	at Sacramento State	Charles C. Hughes Stadium; Sacramento, CA	L 0–17	4,981	
October 29	Cal Poly Pomona*	Redwood Bowl; Arcata, CA	L 22–43	4,300	
November 5	at UC Davis	Toomey Field; Davis, CA	L 29–34	5,100	
November 12	San Francisco State	Redwood Bowl; Arcata, CA	L 17–22	7,000	
November 19	at Nevada*	Mackay Stadium; Reno, NV	W 18–17		
*Non-conference game
