= 1966 Middle Tennessee Blue Raiders football team =

American college football season

1966 Middle Tennessee Blue Raiders football
- Conference: Ohio Valley Conference
- Record: 7–3 (5–2 OVC)
- Head coach: Charles M. Murphy (20th season)
- Captains: L. Dotson; Jerry Smith
- Home stadium: Horace Jones Field

1966 Ohio Valley Conference football standings
| | Conf. | | | | | Overall |
| Team | W | | L | | T | W | | L | | T |
|---|---|---|---|---|---|---|---|---|---|---|
| Morehead State $ | 6 | – | 1 | – | 0 | 7 | – | 2 | – | 0 |
| Middle Tennessee | 5 | – | 2 | – | 0 | 7 | – | 3 | – | 0 |
| Austin Peay | 4 | – | 3 | – | 0 | 6 | – | 4 | – | 0 |
| No. 16 Eastern Kentucky | 4 | – | 3 | – | 0 | 7 | – | 3 | – | 0 |
| Tennessee Tech | 4 | – | 3 | – | 0 | 5 | – | 5 | – | 0 |
| Western Kentucky | 3 | – | 4 | – | 0 | 5 | – | 5 | – | 0 |
| East Tennessee State | 2 | – | 5 | – | 0 | 3 | – | 6 | – | 0 |
| Murray State | 0 | – | 7 | – | 0 | 0 | – | 10 | – | 0 |
$ – Conference champion; Rankings from UPI small college poll

The 1966 Middle Tennessee Blue Raiders football team represented Middle Tennessee State University—as a member of the Ohio Valley Conference (OVC) during the 1966 NCAA College Division football season. Led by 20th-year head coach Charles M. Murphy, the Blue Raiders compiled a record an overall record of 7–3 with a mark of 5–2 in conference play, placing second in the OVC. The team's captains were L. Dotson and Jerry Smith.

== Schedule ==
| Date | Opponent | Rank | Site | Result | Attendance | Source |
|---|---|---|---|---|---|---|
| September 17 | Pensacola Navy* | | Horace Jones Field; Murfreesboro, TN | W 14–12 | 7,000 | |
| September 24 | at Tennessee–Martin* | | Pacer Stadium; Martin, TN | W 10–3 | 6,000 | |
| October 1 | at Western Kentucky | No. T–10 | Bowling Green, KY (rivalry) | W 33–9 | 7,994–10,000 | |
| October 8 | Eastern Kentucky | No. 5 | Horace Jones Field; Murfreesboro, TN | W 22–20 | 10,000 | |
| October 15 | at No. 10 Chattanooga* | No. 3 | Chamberlain Field; Chattanooga, TN | L 0–5 | 8,000 | |
| October 22 | Morehead State | No. 9 | Horace Jones Field; Murfreesboro, TN | W 20–7 | 9,500 | |
| October 29 | Austin Peay | No. 7 | Horace Jones Field; Murfreesboro, TN | L 7–13 | 9,500 | |
| November 5 | Murray State | | Horace Jones Field; Murfreesboro, TN | W 33–0 | 2,500 | |
| November 12 | at East Tennessee State | | State College Stadium; Johnson City, TN | L 0–12 | 5,000 | |
| November 24 | at Tennessee Tech | | Tucker Stadium; Cookeville, TN | W 21–14 | 10,000 | |
*Non-conference game; Rankings from AP Poll released prior to the game
