= 1966 Weber State Wildcats football team =

American college football season

1966 Weber State Wildcats football
- Conference: Big Sky Conference
- Record: 6–3 (2–2 Big Sky)
- Head coach: Sark Arslanian (2nd season)
- Home stadium: Wildcat Stadium

1966 Big Sky Conference football standings
	Conf.					Overall
Team	W		L		T	W		L		T
Montana State $^	4	–	0	–	0	8	–	3	–	0
Idaho	3	–	1	–	0	4	–	6	–	0
Weber State	2	–	2	–	0	6	–	3	–	0
Idaho State	1	–	3	–	0	3	–	6	–	0
Montana	0	–	4	–	0	1	–	8	–	0
$ – Conference champion

The 1966 Weber State Wildcats football team represented Weber State College (now known as Weber State University) as a member of the Big Sky Conference during the 1966 NCAA College Division football season. Led by second-year head coach Sark Arslanian, the Wildcats compiled an overall record of 6–3, with a mark of 2–2 in conference play, and finished third in the Big Sky.

== Schedule ==
Date	Opponent	Rank	Site	Result	Attendance	Source
September 17	at Northern Arizona*		Lumberjack Stadium; Flagstaff, AZ	W 32–14	6,700	
September 24	No. 7 San Diego State*	No. 4	Wildcat Stadium; Ogden, UT	L 34–38	10,961–11,961	
October 1	Cal State Los Angeles*	No. 9	Wildcat Stadium; Ogden, UT	W 70–7	9,729–9,779	
October 8	at Montana	No. 9	Dornblaser Field; Missoula, MT	W 28–0	7,000–7,500	
October 22	at No. 6 Montana State	No. 7	Gatton Field; Bozeman, MT	L 36–45	9,000–9,600	
October 29	Idaho State^{†}		Wildcat Stadium; Ogden, UT	W 16–7	9,054	
November 5	Western State (CO)*		Wildcat Stadium; Ogden, UT	W 42–7	5,762	
November 12	at Portland State*		Wilson High School Stadium; Portland, OR	W 51–6	1,793	
November 19	at Idaho		Neale Stadium; Moscow, ID	L 12–42	4,500	
*Non-conference game; ^{†}Homecoming; Rankings from AP Poll released prior to the game
