= 1966 Eastern Illinois Panthers football team =

American college football season

1966 Eastern Illinois Panthers football
- Conference: Interstate Intercollegiate Athletic Conference
- Record: 1–6–1 (1–1–1 IIAC)
- Head coach: Clyde Biggers (2nd season)
- Home stadium: Lincoln Field

1966 Interstate Intercollegiate Athletic Conference football standings
	Conf.					Overall
Team	W		L		T	W		L		T
Central Michigan $	3	–	0	–	0	5	–	5	–	0
Eastern Illinois	1	–	1	–	1	1	–	6	–	1
Western Illinois	1	–	2	–	0	1	–	7	–	1
Illinois State	0	–	2	–	1	2	–	5	–	2
$ – Conference champion

The 1966 Eastern Illinois Panthers football team represented Eastern Illinois University as a member of the Interstate Intercollegiate Athletic Conference (IIAC) during the 1966 NCAA College Division football season. The team was led by second-year head coach Clyde Biggers and played their home games at Lincoln Field in Charleston, Illinois. The Panthers finished the season with a 1–6–1 record overall and a 1–1–1 record in conference play.

== Schedule ==
Date	Opponent	Site	Result	Attendance	Source
September 17	Indiana State*	Lincoln Field; Charleston, IL	L 0–32	2,000–3,500	
September 24	at Ferris State*	Top Taggart Field; Big Rapids, MI	L 7–17		
October 1	Milwaukee*	Lincoln Field; Charleston, IL	L 3–7	2,500	
October 8	Illinois State^{†}	Lincoln Field; Charleston, IL (rivalry)	T 0–0	4,000	
October 15	at Northwood*	Midland, MI	L 27–34	2,000	
October 22	at Western Illinois	Hanson Field; Macomb, IL	W 16–6	12,100	
November 5	Central Michigan	Lincoln Field; Charleston, IL	L 10–30	4,000	
November 12	at Eastern Michigan*	Briggs Field; Ypsilanti, MI	L 13–17	3,500–3,900	
*Non-conference game; ^{†}Homecoming
