= 1966 Idaho State Bengals football team =

American college football season

1966 Idaho State Bengals football
- Conference: Big Sky Conference
- Record: 3–6 (1–3 Big Sky)
- Head coach: Leo McKillip (1st season)
- Home stadium: Spud Bowl

1966 Big Sky Conference football standings
	Conf.					Overall
Team	W		L		T	W		L		T
Montana State $^	4	–	0	–	0	8	–	3	–	0
Idaho	3	–	1	–	0	4	–	6	–	0
Weber State	2	–	2	–	0	6	–	3	–	0
Idaho State	1	–	3	–	0	3	–	6	–	0
Montana	0	–	4	–	0	1	–	8	–	0
$ – Conference champion

The 1966 Idaho State Bengals football team represented Idaho State University as a member of the Big Sky Conference during the 1966 NCAA College Division football season. Led by first-year head coach Leo McKillip, the Bengals compiled an overall record of 3–6, with a mark of 1–3 in conference play, and finished fourth in the Big Sky.

== Schedule ==
Date	Opponent	Site	Result	Attendance	Source
September 17	Omaha*	Spud Bowl; Pocatello, ID	W 28–20		
September 24	at No. 3 North Dakota*	Memorial Stadium; Grand Forks, ND	L 0–41	8,300–8,570	
October 1	Northern Arizona*	Spud Bowl; Pocatello, ID	L 13–14	4,000–5,000	
October 8	Idaho	Spud Bowl; Pocatello, ID	L 20–27	7,000	
October 15	at No. 7 Montana State	Gatton Field; Bozeman, MT	L 0–49	7,200	
October 22	Montana	Spud Bowl; Pocatello, ID	W 17–14	5,600	
October 29	at Weber State	Wildcat Stadium; Ogden, UT	L 7–16	9,054	
November 12	at Parsons*	Alumni Field; Fairfield, IA	L 8–13	9,000	
November 24	at Portland State*	Multnomah Stadium; Portland, OR	W 12–7		
*Non-conference game; Rankings from AP Poll released prior to the game
