= 1962 Milwaukee Cardinals football team =

American college football season

1962 Milwaukee Cardinals football
- Conference: Wisconsin State College Conference
- Record: 2–6 (2–4 WSCC)
- Head coach: Wally Dreyer (3rd season)
- Home stadium: Shorewood Stadium; Pearse Field

1962 Wisconsin State College Conference football standings
	Conf.					Overall
Team	W		L		T	W		L		T
Whitewater State $	6	–	1	–	0	6	–	3	–	0
Superior State	4	–	1	–	1	7	–	1	–	1
Stevens Point State	5	–	2	–	0	6	–	2	–	0
Eau Claire State	5	–	2	–	0	5	–	3	–	0
La Crosse State	4	–	3	–	0	4	–	5	–	0
River Falls State	3	–	4	–	0	3	–	5	–	1
Milwaukee	2	–	4	–	0	2	–	6	–	0
Platteville State	2	–	4	–	0	2	–	6	–	0
Stout State	1	–	4	–	1	2	–	5	–	1
Oshkosh State	0	–	7	–	0	0	–	7	–	0
$ – Conference champion

The 1962 Milwaukee Cardinals football team represented the University of Wisconsin–Milwaukee as a member of the Wisconsin State College Conference (WSCC) during the 1962 college football season. Led by Wally Dreyer in his third season as head coach, Milwaukee compiled a record of 2–6, with a record in conference of 2–4, and finished tied for seventh in the WSCC.

== Schedule ==
Date	Opponent	Site	Result	Attendance	Source
September 15	at Ferris State*	Top Taggart Field; Big Rapids, MI	L 0–20		
September 22	at Oshkosh State	Jackson Street Field; Oshkosh, WI	W 7–6		
September 29	La Crosse State	Shorewood Stadium; Shorewood, WI	L 13–42	4,000	
October 6	at River Falls State	Ramer Field; River Falls, WI	L 6–19		
October 13	Stevens Point State	Shorewood Stadium; Shorewood, WI	L 7–32	3,000	
October 20	Whitewater State	Pearse Field; Milwaukee, WI	L 6–38	1,800	
October 27	at Platteville State	Platteville, WI	W 16–6		
November 3	Bradley*	Pearse Field; Milwaukee, WI	L 6–20	1,200	
*Non-conference game; Source:
