= 1966 Nevada Wolf Pack football team =

American college football season

1966 Nevada Wolf Pack football
- Conference: Far Western Conference
- Record: 6–3 (3–3 FWC)
- Head coach: Dick Trachok (8th season)
- Home stadium: Mackay Stadium

1966 Far Western Conference football standings
	Conf.					Overall
Team	W		L		T	W		L		T
Sacramento State $	6	–	0	–	0	8	–	2	–	0
San Francisco State	5	–	1	–	0	7	–	3	–	0
Nevada	3	–	3	–	0	6	–	3	–	0
UC Davis	3	–	3	–	0	5	–	5	–	0
Humboldt State	2	–	4	–	0	4	–	6	–	0
Chico State	1	–	5	–	0	4	–	6	–	0
Cal State Hayward	1	–	5	–	0	2	–	8	–	0
$ – Conference champion

The 1966 Nevada Wolf Pack football team represented the University of Nevada during the 1966 NCAA College Division football season. Nevada competed as a member of the Far Western Conference (FWC). The Wolf Pack were led by eighth-year head coach Dick Trachok and played their home games at Mackay Stadium.

== Schedule ==
Date	Opponent	Site	Result	Attendance	Source
September 24	at Willamette*	McCulloch Stadium; Salem, OR	W 28–21		
October 1	UC Santa Barbara*	Mackay Stadium; Reno, NV	W 33–17	4,800	
October 8	at UC Davis	Toomey Field; Davis, CA	W 26–10	4,800	
October 15	San Francisco State	Mackay Stadium; Reno, NV	L 0–27	6,000	
October 22	San Francisco*^{†}	Mackay Stadium; Reno, NV	W 40–16	6,200	
October 29	at Chico State	College Field; Chico, CA	W 41–31	3,500	
November 5	at Cal State Hayward	Pioneer Stadium; Hayward, CA	W 24–0	1,800	
November 12	Sacramento State	Mackay Stadium; Reno, NV	L 8–13	6,000	
November 19	Humboldt State	Mackay Stadium; Reno, NV	L 17–18		
*Non-conference game; ^{†}Homecoming
