= 1966 Idaho Vandals football team =

American college football season

1966 Idaho Vandals football
- Conference: Big Sky Conference
- Record: 4–6 (3–1 Big Sky)
- Head coach: Steve Musseau (2nd season)
- Captains: John Foruria; Ron Porter
- Home stadium: Neale Stadium

1966 Big Sky Conference football standings
	Conf.					Overall
Team	W		L		T	W		L		T
Montana State $^	4	–	0	–	0	8	–	3	–	0
Idaho	3	–	1	–	0	4	–	6	–	0
Weber State	2	–	2	–	0	6	–	3	–	0
Idaho State	1	–	3	–	0	3	–	6	–	0
Montana	0	–	4	–	0	1	–	8	–	0
$ – Conference champion

The 1966 Idaho Vandals football team represented the University of Idaho in the 1966 NCAA University Division football season. The Vandals were led by second-year head coach Steve Musseau and played a second season in the Big Sky Conference, but remained in the NCAA University Division. Home games were played on campus at Neale Stadium in Moscow, with one home game in Boise at old Bronco Stadium at Boise Junior College.

Led on the field by quarterbacks John Foruria and Steve Garman and senior fullback Ray McDonald, the Vandals were 4–6 overall and 3–1 in conference play. Idaho nearly won the Battle of the Palouse with neighbor Washington State for the third straight year, but lost 14–7 in the chilly mud at Neale Stadium after giving up two late touchdowns. It remains the last time the rivalry was played in the state of Idaho; the Vandals dropped fourteen straight to the Cougars until consecutive wins in 1999 and 2000.

McDonald rushed for 255 yards in the season finale against Weber State and led the NCAA for the season with 1,329 yards. He was the thirteenth overall selection in the 1967 NFL Draft, the highest-ever for a Vandal, taken by the Washington Redskins.

== Schedule ==
Date	Time	Opponent	Site	Result	Attendance	Source
September 17	1:30 pm	at Washington*	Husky Stadium; Seattle, WA	L 7–19	55,360	
September 24	12:30 pm	at Montana State	Gatton Field; Bozeman, MT	L 10–24	9,500	
October 1	1:30 pm	Pacific (CA)*^{†}	Neale Stadium; Moscow ID	W 28–7	6,700–12,500	
October 8	12:30 pm	at Idaho State	Spud Bowl; Pocatello, ID	W 27–20	7,000	
October 15	1:30 pm	at Oregon State*	Parker Stadium; Corvallis OR	L 7–14	16,141	
October 22	1:30 pm	Washington State*	Neale Stadium; Moscow, ID (Battle of the Palouse)	L 7–14	16,500	
October 29	12:30 pm	vs. Oregon*	old Bronco Stadium; Boise, ID	L 7–28	11,500	
November 5	1:30 pm	at San Jose State*	Spartan Stadium; San Jose, CA	L 7–21	16,200	
November 12	1:30 pm	Montana	Neale Stadium; Moscow, ID (Little Brown Stein)	W 40–6	5,500	
November 19	1:30 pm	Weber State	Neale Stadium; Moscow, ID	W 42–12	4,800	
*Non-conference game; ^{†}Homecoming; All times are in Pacific time

== Roster ==
1966 Idaho Vandals football team roster
Players
Coaches
Offense

Pos.	#	Name	Class
QB	10	John Foruria (C)	Sr
QB	14	Paul Gentle	Jr
QB, P	16	Joe Rodriguez	Sr
QB	18	Steve Garman	So
E	20	Jerry Skaife	Sr
WB	22	Joe McCollum	Sr
FB	32	Ray McDonald	Sr
WB, PK	36	Darrell Danielson	Jr
FB	40	Art Chubb
WB	43	Jim Pearsall	So
HB	44	Butch Slaughter	Sr
C	51	Gary Atkinson	So
C	55	Bob Skuse	Sr
OL	61	Karl Kleinkopf	Jr
RG	65	Bob McCray	Jr
LG	67	Steve Ulrich	Jr
OL	71	Jim Thiemens	Jr
OL	72	Brian Evans	Jr
LT	79	Gary Grove	So
WR	81	Rich Toney	Jr
OL	82	Bill Bufton	Sr
TE	83	Tim Lavens	Sr
WR	88	Manny Murrell	So

Defense

Pos.	#	Name	Class
S	11	Jerry Ahlin	Sr
DB	20	Pat Davidson	Jr
CB	21	Dick Nelson	So
DB	24	Byron Strickland	Jr
CB	27	Kenny Dotson	So
DB	34	John Shelt	Jr
DB	38	Gayle Young	Jr
DB	42	Rob Young	So
DB	45	Rob Woodward
LB	50	Al Busby	Sr
DT	60	John Daniel	Sr
LB	63	LaVerle Pratt	Sr
LB	66	Ron Porter (C)	Sr
DT	70	Gary Fitzpatrick	Sr
MG	73	Tom Carson	So
DL	74	Vic Mann	Jr
DT	75	Dick Arndt	Sr
DT	78	Bud Fernandez	Sr
DE, KR	80	Ray Miller	Sr
DE	85	Tom Stephens	Sr

Special teams

Pos.	#	Name	Class
P	16	Joe Rodriguez	Sr
PK	36	Darrell Danielson	Jr
KR	80	Ray Miller	Sr

Head coach

- Steve Musseau (2nd year)

Coordinators/assistant coaches

- Herb Adams (OB)
- Walt Anderson (OL)
- Billy Hughes (DB)
- Jack Jacobsen (LB)
- John G. Smith (DL)

Legend

- (C) Team captain
- (S) Suspended
- (I) Ineligible
- Injured
- Redshirt

== All-conference ==
Fullback Ray McDonald was a unanimous selection to the all-conference team, joined by guard Steve Ulrich, center Bob Skuse, defensive end Tom Stephens, middle guard Dick Arndt, and linebacker Ron Porter. Second team (honorable mention) picks were guard Bob McCray, tackle Gary Fitzpatrick, tight end Tim Lavens, quarterback Steve Garman, defensive tackles John Daniel and Ray Miller, linebacker Jerry Ahlin, and defensive backs Byron Strickland and John Foruria.

McDonald was a second-team All-American (AP, UPI, NEA), and a first team selection by the Sporting News and Time.

== NFL draft ==
Four Vandal seniors were selected in the 1967 NFL/AFL draft, the first common draft, which lasted 17 rounds (445 selections).

Player	Position	Round	Overall	Franchise
Ray McDonald	RB	1st	13	Washington Redskins
Ron Porter	LB	5th	126	Baltimore Colts
John Foruria	QB	8th	192	Pittsburgh Steelers
Tim Lavens	TE	9th	212	New Orleans Saints

Three seniors were previously selected as future picks in the 1966 NFL draft, which lasted 20 rounds (305 selections).

Player	Position	Round	Overall	Franchise
Dick Arndt	DT	5th	77	Los Angeles Rams
Ray Miller	DE	7th	108	Green Bay Packers
LaVerle Pratt	LB	14th	210	St. Louis Cardinals
