= 1966 Northern Arizona Lumberjacks football team =

American college football season

1966 Northern Arizona Lumberjacks football
- Conference: Independent
- Record: 6–4
- Head coach: Andy MacDonald (2nd season)
- Home stadium: Lumberjack Stadium

1966 NCAA College Division independents football records
	Conf.			Overall
Team	W	L	T	W		L		T
St. Norbert		–		7	–	1	–	1
Parsons		–		9	–	2	–	0
Drake		–		8	–	2	–	0
Northern Illinois		–		8	–	2	–	0
Indiana (PA)		–		7	–	2	–	0
Santa Clara		–		7	–	2	–	0
Cortland		–		6	–	2	–	0
Northeastern		–		6	–	2	–	0
Akron		–		6	–	3	–	0
Northern Michigan		–		6	–	3	–	1
Samford		–		6	–	3	–	1
Carnegie Tech		–		5	–	3	–	0
Eastern Michigan		–		5	–	3	–	1
Ashland		–		5	–	3	–	2
Northern Arizona		–		6	–	4	–	0
UC Santa Barbara		–		6	–	4	–	0
Wheaton (IL)		–		5	–	4	–	0
Boston University		–		5	–	5	–	0
Cal Poly Pomona		–		5	–	5	–	0
Chattanooga		–		5	–	5	–	0
Colorado College		–		4	–	4	–	0
Wabash		–		4	–	4	–	1
Milwaukee		–		4	–	5	–	1
Southern Illinois		–		4	–	5	–	1
UC Riverside		–		4	–	5	–	0
Tampa		–		4	–	5	–	0
Rose Poly		–		3	–	4	–	1
Hawaii		–		4	–	6	–	0
Portland State		–		4	–	6	–	0
Lake Forest		–		2	–	5	–	0
Wayne State (MI)		–		2	–	6	–	0
Mississippi Valley State		–		2	–	7	–	0

The 1966 Northern Arizona Lumberjacks football team was an American football team that represented Northern Arizona University (NAU) as an independent during the 1966 NCAA College Division football season. In their second year under head coach Andy MacDonald, the Lumberjacks compiled a 6–4 record and outscored opponents by a total of 202 to 159.

The team played its home games at Lumberjack Stadium in Flagstaff, Arizona.

== Schedule ==
Date	Opponent	Site	Result	Attendance	Source
September 17	Weber State	Lumberjack Stadium; Flagstaff, AZ	L 14–32	6,700	
September 24	at Fresno State	Ratcliffe Stadium; Fresno, CA	L 12–14	8,586–10,500	
October 1	at Idaho State	Spud Bowl; Pocatello, ID	W 14–13	4,000–5,000	
October 8	Central Missouri State	Lumberjack Stadium; Flagstaff, AZ	W 34–16	6,000–7,000	
October 15	at Cal Poly Pomona	Kellogg Field; Pomona, CA	W 26–0	2,000–2,050	
October 22	Long Beach State	Lumberjack Stadium; Flagstaff, AZ	W 32–12	7,300	
October 29	Montana	Lumberjack Stadium; Flagstaff, AZ	W 34–8	5,000	
November 5	West Texas State	Lumberjack Stadium; Flagstaff, AZ	L 7–34	6,900	
November 12	at Eastern New Mexico	Greyhound Stadium; Portales, NM	W 21–14	1,250	
November 19	at No. 1 San Diego State	Aztec Bowl; San Diego, CA	L 8–16	10,047	
Rankings from AP Poll released prior to the game
