= 1966 Akron Zips football team =

American college football season

1966 Akron Zips football
- Conference: Independent
- Record: 6–3
- Head coach: Gordon K. Larson (6th season)
- Captain: Jim Braccio; George Fuciu
- Home stadium: Rubber Bowl

1966 NCAA College Division independents football records
	Conf.			Overall
Team	W	L	T	W		L		T
St. Norbert		–		7	–	1	–	1
Parsons		–		9	–	2	–	0
Drake		–		8	–	2	–	0
Northern Illinois		–		8	–	2	–	0
Indiana (PA)		–		7	–	2	–	0
Santa Clara		–		7	–	2	–	0
Cortland		–		6	–	2	–	0
Northeastern		–		6	–	2	–	0
Akron		–		6	–	3	–	0
Northern Michigan		–		6	–	3	–	1
Samford		–		6	–	3	–	1
Carnegie Tech		–		5	–	3	–	0
Eastern Michigan		–		5	–	3	–	1
Ashland		–		5	–	3	–	2
Northern Arizona		–		6	–	4	–	0
UC Santa Barbara		–		6	–	4	–	0
Wheaton (IL)		–		5	–	4	–	0
Boston University		–		5	–	5	–	0
Cal Poly Pomona		–		5	–	5	–	0
Chattanooga		–		5	–	5	–	0
Colorado College		–		4	–	4	–	0
Wabash		–		4	–	4	–	1
Milwaukee		–		4	–	5	–	1
Southern Illinois		–		4	–	5	–	1
UC Riverside		–		4	–	5	–	0
Tampa		–		4	–	5	–	0
Rose Poly		–		3	–	4	–	1
Hawaii		–		4	–	6	–	0
Portland State		–		4	–	6	–	0
Lake Forest		–		2	–	5	–	0
Wayne State (MI)		–		2	–	6	–	0
Mississippi Valley State		–		2	–	7	–	0

The 1966 Akron Zips football team represented Akron University in the 1966 NCAA College Division football season as an independent. Led by sixth-year head coach Gordon K. Larson, the Zips played their home games at the Rubber Bowl in Akron, Ohio. They finished the season with a record of 6–3 and outscored their opponents 137–116.

== Schedule ==
Date	Opponent	Rank	Site	Result	Attendance	Source
September 17	Northern Michigan		Rubber Bowl; Akron, OH	W 18–10	40,166	
September 24	at Muskingum	No. 9	McConagha Stadium; New Concord, OH	L 0–28	3,700	
October 1	at Tampa		Tampa Stadium; Tampa, FL	L 12–20	9,500–10,000	
October 8	No. 8 Wittenberg		Rubber Bowl; Akron, OH	W 14–7	4,300	
October 15	Wooster		Rubber Bowl; Akron, OH	W 26–0	2,000	
October 22	Baldwin–Wallace		Rubber Bowl; Akron, OH	W 9–6	4,514	
October 29	at Northern Illinois		Huskie Stadium; DeKalb, IL	L 18–31	18,921	
November 5	at Butler		Butler Bowl; Indianapolis, IN	W 20–14	1,700	
November 12	Heidelberg		Rubber Bowl; Akron, OH	W 20–0	1,100	
Rankings from AP Poll released prior to the game
