= 1966 Eastern Michigan Hurons football team =

American college football season

1966 Eastern Michigan Hurons football
- Conference: Independent
- Record: 5–3–1
- Head coach: Jerry Raymond (2nd season)
- Captains: Jonas Halonen; Ed Mass; Lonny Head
- Home stadium: Briggs Field

1966 NCAA College Division independents football records
| | Conf. | | | Overall |
| Team | W | L | T | W | | L | | T |
|---|---|---|---|---|---|---|---|---|
| St. Norbert | | – | | 7 | – | 1 | – | 1 |
| Parsons | | – | | 9 | – | 2 | – | 0 |
| Drake | | – | | 8 | – | 2 | – | 0 |
| Northern Illinois | | – | | 8 | – | 2 | – | 0 |
| Indiana (PA) | | – | | 7 | – | 2 | – | 0 |
| Santa Clara | | – | | 7 | – | 2 | – | 0 |
| Cortland | | – | | 6 | – | 2 | – | 0 |
| Northeastern | | – | | 6 | – | 2 | – | 0 |
| Akron | | – | | 6 | – | 3 | – | 0 |
| Northern Michigan | | – | | 6 | – | 3 | – | 1 |
| Samford | | – | | 6 | – | 3 | – | 1 |
| Carnegie Tech | | – | | 5 | – | 3 | – | 0 |
| Eastern Michigan | | – | | 5 | – | 3 | – | 1 |
| Ashland | | – | | 5 | – | 3 | – | 2 |
| Northern Arizona | | – | | 6 | – | 4 | – | 0 |
| UC Santa Barbara | | – | | 6 | – | 4 | – | 0 |
| Wheaton (IL) | | – | | 5 | – | 4 | – | 0 |
| Boston University | | – | | 5 | – | 5 | – | 0 |
| Cal Poly Pomona | | – | | 5 | – | 5 | – | 0 |
| Chattanooga | | – | | 5 | – | 5 | – | 0 |
| Colorado College | | – | | 4 | – | 4 | – | 0 |
| Wabash | | – | | 4 | – | 4 | – | 1 |
| Milwaukee | | – | | 4 | – | 5 | – | 1 |
| Southern Illinois | | – | | 4 | – | 5 | – | 1 |
| UC Riverside | | – | | 4 | – | 5 | – | 0 |
| Tampa | | – | | 4 | – | 5 | – | 0 |
| Rose Poly | | – | | 3 | – | 4 | – | 1 |
| Hawaii | | – | | 4 | – | 6 | – | 0 |
| Portland State | | – | | 4 | – | 6 | – | 0 |
| Lake Forest | | – | | 2 | – | 5 | – | 0 |
| Wayne State (MI) | | – | | 2 | – | 6 | – | 0 |
| Mississippi Valley State | | – | | 2 | – | 7 | – | 0 |

The 1966 Eastern Michigan Hurons football team represented Eastern Michigan University as an independent during the 1966 NCAA College Division football season. In their second and final season under head coach Jerry Raymond, the Hurons compiled a 5–3–1 record and outscored their opponents, 100 to 87.

In August 1967, Eastern Michigan athletic director Frosty Ferzacca announced that Raymond was being replaced as head coach by Dan Boisture. Although Raymond had served as head coach for two full seasons, Ferzacca stated that "Raymond was serving as our interim coach." Raymond compiled an 8–7–2 record in two seasons as the school's "interim" head coach.

== Schedule ==
| Date | Opponent | Site | Result | Attendance | Source |
|---|---|---|---|---|---|
| September 17 | at Findlay | Findlay, OH | L 0–20 | | |
| September 24 | at Western Illinois | Hanson Field; Macomb, IL | T 0–0 | | |
| October 1 | Kentucky State | Briggs Field; Ypsilanti, MI | L 9–26 | 6,000 | |
| October 8 | Western Reserve | Briggs Field; Ypsilanti, MI | W 16–3 | 4,500 | |
| October 15 | at John Carroll | University Heights, OH | W 12–2 | | |
| October 22 | Ferris State^{†} | Briggs Field; Ypsilanti, MI | W 21–6 | 6,500 | |
| October 29 | Wayne State (MI) | Briggs Field; Ypsilanti, MI | W 16–0 | 5,000 | |
| November 5 | at Ohio Northern | Ada, OH | L 9–17 | | |
| November 12 | Eastern Illinois | Briggs Field; Ypsilanti, MI | W 17–13 | 3,500–3,900 | |
^{†}Homecoming

== After the season ==
The following Huron was selected in the 1967 NFL/AFL draft after the season.

| Round | Pick | Player | Position | NFL club |
|---|---|---|---|---|
| 13 | 328 | Robert Rodwell | Linebacker | Washington Redskins |
