= 1966 Boston University Terriers football team =

American college football season

1966 Boston University Terriers football
- Conference: Independent
- Record: 5–5
- Head coach: Warren Schmakel (3rd season)
- Home stadium: Nickerson Field

1966 NCAA College Division independents football records
	Conf.			Overall
Team	W	L	T	W		L		T
St. Norbert		–		7	–	1	–	1
Parsons		–		9	–	2	–	0
Drake		–		8	–	2	–	0
Northern Illinois		–		8	–	2	–	0
Indiana (PA)		–		7	–	2	–	0
Santa Clara		–		7	–	2	–	0
Cortland		–		6	–	2	–	0
Northeastern		–		6	–	2	–	0
Akron		–		6	–	3	–	0
Northern Michigan		–		6	–	3	–	1
Samford		–		6	–	3	–	1
Carnegie Tech		–		5	–	3	–	0
Eastern Michigan		–		5	–	3	–	1
Ashland		–		5	–	3	–	2
Northern Arizona		–		6	–	4	–	0
UC Santa Barbara		–		6	–	4	–	0
Wheaton (IL)		–		5	–	4	–	0
Boston University		–		5	–	5	–	0
Cal Poly Pomona		–		5	–	5	–	0
Chattanooga		–		5	–	5	–	0
Colorado College		–		4	–	4	–	0
Wabash		–		4	–	4	–	1
Milwaukee		–		4	–	5	–	1
Southern Illinois		–		4	–	5	–	1
UC Riverside		–		4	–	5	–	0
Tampa		–		4	–	5	–	0
Rose Poly		–		3	–	4	–	1
Hawaii		–		4	–	6	–	0
Portland State		–		4	–	6	–	0
Lake Forest		–		2	–	5	–	0
Wayne State (MI)		–		2	–	6	–	0
Mississippi Valley State		–		2	–	7	–	0

The 1966 Boston University Terriers football team was an American football team that represented Boston University as an independent during the 1966 NCAA College Division football season. During the team's third season under head coach Warren Schmakel, the team compiled a 5–5 record and outscored various opponents by a total of 182 to 155.

== Schedule ==
Date	Opponent	Site	Result	Attendance	Source
September 17	at Colgate	Andy Kerr Stadium; Hamilton, NY	L 0–34	8,000	
September 24	at Maine	Alumni Field; Orono, ME	W 20–7	8,012	
October 1	Temple	Nickerson Field; Boston, MA	L 6–9	2,000	
October 8	Buffalo	Nickerson Field; Boston, MA	W 26–16	7,500	
October 15	Holy Cross	Nickerson Field; Boston, MA	L 14–17	15,000	
October 22	at UMass	Alumni Stadium; Amherst, MA	L 7–12	18,700	
October 29	at Rutgers	Rutgers Stadium; Piscataway, NJ	L 7–16	19,500	
November 5	at Connecticut	Memorial Stadium; Storrs, CT	W 30–16		
November 12	No. 14 Delaware	Nickerson Field; Boston, MA	W 42–14	5,000	
November 19	at Rhode Island	Meade Stadium; Kingston, RI	W 30–14	5,280	
Rankings from UPI Coaches Poll released prior to the game
