= 1966 UC Riverside Highlanders football team =

American college football season

1966 UC Riverside Highlanders football
- Conference: Independent
- Record: 4–5
- Head coach: Pete Kettela (2nd season)
- Home stadium: Highlander Stadium

1966 NCAA College Division independents football records
| | Conf. | | | Overall |
| Team | W | L | T | W | | L | | T |
|---|---|---|---|---|---|---|---|---|
| St. Norbert | | – | | 7 | – | 1 | – | 1 |
| Parsons | | – | | 9 | – | 2 | – | 0 |
| Drake | | – | | 8 | – | 2 | – | 0 |
| Northern Illinois | | – | | 8 | – | 2 | – | 0 |
| Indiana (PA) | | – | | 7 | – | 2 | – | 0 |
| Santa Clara | | – | | 7 | – | 2 | – | 0 |
| Cortland | | – | | 6 | – | 2 | – | 0 |
| Northeastern | | – | | 6 | – | 2 | – | 0 |
| Akron | | – | | 6 | – | 3 | – | 0 |
| Northern Michigan | | – | | 6 | – | 3 | – | 1 |
| Samford | | – | | 6 | – | 3 | – | 1 |
| Carnegie Tech | | – | | 5 | – | 3 | – | 0 |
| Eastern Michigan | | – | | 5 | – | 3 | – | 1 |
| Ashland | | – | | 5 | – | 3 | – | 2 |
| Northern Arizona | | – | | 6 | – | 4 | – | 0 |
| UC Santa Barbara | | – | | 6 | – | 4 | – | 0 |
| Wheaton (IL) | | – | | 5 | – | 4 | – | 0 |
| Boston University | | – | | 5 | – | 5 | – | 0 |
| Cal Poly Pomona | | – | | 5 | – | 5 | – | 0 |
| Chattanooga | | – | | 5 | – | 5 | – | 0 |
| Colorado College | | – | | 4 | – | 4 | – | 0 |
| Wabash | | – | | 4 | – | 4 | – | 1 |
| Milwaukee | | – | | 4 | – | 5 | – | 1 |
| Southern Illinois | | – | | 4 | – | 5 | – | 1 |
| UC Riverside | | – | | 4 | – | 5 | – | 0 |
| Tampa | | – | | 4 | – | 5 | – | 0 |
| Rose Poly | | – | | 3 | – | 4 | – | 1 |
| Hawaii | | – | | 4 | – | 6 | – | 0 |
| Portland State | | – | | 4 | – | 6 | – | 0 |
| Mississippi Valley State | | – | | 3 | – | 6 | – | 0 |
| Lake Forest | | – | | 2 | – | 5 | – | 0 |
| Wayne State (MI) | | – | | 2 | – | 6 | – | 0 |

The 1966 UC Riverside Highlanders football team represented the University of California, Riverside as an independent during the 1966 NCAA College Division football season. Led by second-year head coach Pete Kettela, UC Riverside compiled a record of 4–5. The team outscored its opponents 235 to 182 for the season. The Highlanders played home games at Highlander Stadium in Riverside, California.

== Schedule ==
| Date | Opponent | Site | Result | Attendance |
|---|---|---|---|---|
| September 24 | at UC Davis | Toomey Field; Davis, CA | L 7–27 | 3,000 |
| October 1 | La Verne | Highlander Stadium; Riverside, CA | W 48–6 | 3,500 |
| October 8 | at San Francisco | Kezar Stadium; San Francisco, CA | L 23–42 | 1,500 |
| October 15 | at Redlands | Redlands Stadium (Note: This stadium is the predecessor to the current Ted Runner Stadium on the University of Redlands campus, which was opened for the 1968 season); Redlands, CA | L 0–27 | 3,000 |
| October 22 | Claremont-Mudd | Highlander Stadium; Riverside, CA | W 36–7 | 3,500 |
| October 29 | Pomona | Highlander Stadium; Riverside, CA | L 15–31 | 3,000 |
| November 4 | Caltech | Highlander Stadium; Riverside, CA | W 43–0 | 3,000 |
| November 12 | Azusa Pacific | Highlander Stadium; Riverside, CA | W 41–6 | 4,000 |
| November 19 | at Cal Lutheran | Mt. Clef Field; Thousand Oaks, CA | L 22–36 | 1,500 |
