= 1966 Cal Poly Pomona Broncos football team =

American college football season

1966 Cal Poly Pomona Broncos football
- Conference: Independent
- Record: 5–5
- Head coach: Don Warhurst (10th season)
- Home stadium: Kellogg Field

1966 NCAA College Division independents football records
| | Conf. | | | Overall |
| Team | W | L | T | W | | L | | T |
|---|---|---|---|---|---|---|---|---|
| St. Norbert | | – | | 7 | – | 1 | – | 1 |
| Parsons | | – | | 9 | – | 2 | – | 0 |
| Drake | | – | | 8 | – | 2 | – | 0 |
| Northern Illinois | | – | | 8 | – | 2 | – | 0 |
| Indiana (PA) | | – | | 7 | – | 2 | – | 0 |
| Santa Clara | | – | | 7 | – | 2 | – | 0 |
| Cortland | | – | | 6 | – | 2 | – | 0 |
| Northeastern | | – | | 6 | – | 2 | – | 0 |
| Akron | | – | | 6 | – | 3 | – | 0 |
| Northern Michigan | | – | | 6 | – | 3 | – | 1 |
| Samford | | – | | 6 | – | 3 | – | 1 |
| Carnegie Tech | | – | | 5 | – | 3 | – | 0 |
| Eastern Michigan | | – | | 5 | – | 3 | – | 1 |
| Ashland | | – | | 5 | – | 3 | – | 2 |
| Northern Arizona | | – | | 6 | – | 4 | – | 0 |
| UC Santa Barbara | | – | | 6 | – | 4 | – | 0 |
| Wheaton (IL) | | – | | 5 | – | 4 | – | 0 |
| Boston University | | – | | 5 | – | 5 | – | 0 |
| Cal Poly Pomona | | – | | 5 | – | 5 | – | 0 |
| Chattanooga | | – | | 5 | – | 5 | – | 0 |
| Colorado College | | – | | 4 | – | 4 | – | 0 |
| Wabash | | – | | 4 | – | 4 | – | 1 |
| Milwaukee | | – | | 4 | – | 5 | – | 1 |
| Southern Illinois | | – | | 4 | – | 5 | – | 1 |
| UC Riverside | | – | | 4 | – | 5 | – | 0 |
| Tampa | | – | | 4 | – | 5 | – | 0 |
| Rose Poly | | – | | 3 | – | 4 | – | 1 |
| Hawaii | | – | | 4 | – | 6 | – | 0 |
| Portland State | | – | | 4 | – | 6 | – | 0 |
| Mississippi Valley State | | – | | 3 | – | 6 | – | 0 |
| Lake Forest | | – | | 2 | – | 5 | – | 0 |
| Wayne State (MI) | | – | | 2 | – | 6 | – | 0 |

The 1966 Cal Poly Pomona Broncos football team represented California State Polytechnic College, Kellogg-Voorhis—now known as California State Polytechnic University, Pomona—as an independent during the 1966 NCAA College Division football season. Led by Don Warhurst in his tenth and final season as head coach, Cal Poly Pomona compiled a record of 5–5. The team outscored its opponents 264 to 263 for the season. The Broncos played home games at Kellogg Field in Pomona, California.

Warhurst finished his tenure at Cal Poly Pomona with an overall record of 56–33–2, for a .626 winning percentage. The school joined the California Collegiate Athletic Association (CCAA) in 1967, but the football team's games did not count as conference play until 1969 as the Broncos did not play a full conference schedule in 1967 and 1968.

== Schedule ==
| Date | Opponent | Site | Result | Attendance | Source |
|---|---|---|---|---|---|
| September 17 | Pomona | Kellogg Field; Pomona, CA | W 41–31 | 2,000 | |
| September 24 | at Whittier | Hadley Field; Whittier, CA | W 21–14 | 2,500 | |
| October 1 | at Sacramento State | Charles C. Hughes Stadium; Sacramento, CA | L 17–26 | 2,500–3,000 | |
| October 8 | at San Francisco State | Cox Stadium; San Francisco, CA | L 26–28 | 2,000–2,200 | |
| October 15 | Northern Arizona | Kellogg Field; Pomona, CA | L 0–26 | 2,000–2,050 | |
| October 22 | at UC Santa Barbara | Campus Stadium; Santa Barbara, CA | L 20–43 | 4,400–6,000 | |
| October 29 | at Humboldt State | Redwood Bowl; Arcata, CA | W 43–22 | 4,300 | |
| November 5 | Valley State | Kellogg Field; Pomona, CA | W 49–24 | 2,500–4,000 | |
| November 12 | UC Davis | Kellogg Field; Pomona, CA | W 35–13 | 1,500–2,200 | |
| November 19 | Santa Clara | Kellogg Field; Pomona, CA | L 12–36 | 2,000 | |
