= 1966 Hawaii Rainbows football team =

American college football season

1966 Hawaii Rainbows football
- Conference: Independent
- Record: 4–6
- Head coach: Phil Sarboe (1st season)
- Home stadium: Honolulu Stadium

1966 NCAA College Division independents football records
	Conf.			Overall
Team	W	L	T	W		L		T
St. Norbert		–		7	–	1	–	1
Parsons		–		9	–	2	–	0
Drake		–		8	–	2	–	0
Northern Illinois		–		8	–	2	–	0
Indiana (PA)		–		7	–	2	–	0
Santa Clara		–		7	–	2	–	0
Cortland		–		6	–	2	–	0
Northeastern		–		6	–	2	–	0
Akron		–		6	–	3	–	0
Northern Michigan		–		6	–	3	–	1
Samford		–		6	–	3	–	1
Carnegie Tech		–		5	–	3	–	0
Eastern Michigan		–		5	–	3	–	1
Ashland		–		5	–	3	–	2
Northern Arizona		–		6	–	4	–	0
UC Santa Barbara		–		6	–	4	–	0
Wheaton (IL)		–		5	–	4	–	0
Boston University		–		5	–	5	–	0
Cal Poly Pomona		–		5	–	5	–	0
Chattanooga		–		5	–	5	–	0
Colorado College		–		4	–	4	–	0
Wabash		–		4	–	4	–	1
Milwaukee		–		4	–	5	–	1
Southern Illinois		–		4	–	5	–	1
UC Riverside		–		4	–	5	–	0
Tampa		–		4	–	5	–	0
Rose Poly		–		3	–	4	–	1
Hawaii		–		4	–	6	–	0
Portland State		–		4	–	6	–	0
Mississippi Valley State		–		3	–	6	–	0
Lake Forest		–		2	–	5	–	0
Wayne State (MI)		–		2	–	6	–	0

The 1966 Hawaii Rainbows football team represented the University of Hawaiʻi at Mānoa as an independent during the 1966 NCAA College Division football season. In their first season under head coach Phil Sarboe, the Rainbows compiled a 4–6 record.

== Schedule ==
Date	Opponent	Site	Result	Attendance
September 17	at Fresno State	Ratcliffe Stadium; Fresno, CA (rivalry)	L 27–28	12,000
September 24	at UC Santa Barbara	Campus Stadium; Santa Barbara, CA	L 6–24	
October 1	UBC	Honolulu Stadium; Honolulu, HI	W 27–6	6,734
October 8	at Air Force	Falcon Stadium; Colorado Springs, CO (rivalry)	L 0–54	37,786
October 15	Humboldt State	Honolulu Stadium; Honolulu, HI	W 7–0	4,500
October 22	Pacific (CA)	Honolulu Stadium; Honolulu, HI	L 0–41	7,000
October 29	Cal Western	Honolulu Stadium; Honolulu, HI	W 21–17	
November 5	Whitworth	Honolulu Stadium; Honolulu, HI	W 12–6	1,000
November 19	Parsons^{†}	Honolulu Stadium; Honolulu, HI	L 10–21	7,500
November 26	Utah State	Honolulu Stadium; Honolulu, HI	L 0–48	10,000
^{†}Homecoming
