= 1966 Tampa Spartans football team =

American college football season

1966 Tampa Spartans football
- Conference: Independent
- Record: 4–5
- Head coach: Sam Bailey (3rd season)
- Home stadium: Phillips Field

1966 NCAA College Division independents football records
	Conf.			Overall
Team	W	L	T	W		L		T
St. Norbert		–		7	–	1	–	1
Parsons		–		9	–	2	–	0
Drake		–		8	–	2	–	0
Northern Illinois		–		8	–	2	–	0
Indiana (PA)		–		7	–	2	–	0
Santa Clara		–		7	–	2	–	0
Cortland		–		6	–	2	–	0
Northeastern		–		6	–	2	–	0
Akron		–		6	–	3	–	0
Northern Michigan		–		6	–	3	–	1
Samford		–		6	–	3	–	1
Carnegie Tech		–		5	–	3	–	0
Eastern Michigan		–		5	–	3	–	1
Ashland		–		5	–	3	–	2
Northern Arizona		–		6	–	4	–	0
UC Santa Barbara		–		6	–	4	–	0
Wheaton (IL)		–		5	–	4	–	0
Boston University		–		5	–	5	–	0
Cal Poly Pomona		–		5	–	5	–	0
Chattanooga		–		5	–	5	–	0
Colorado College		–		4	–	4	–	0
Wabash		–		4	–	4	–	1
Milwaukee		–		4	–	5	–	1
Southern Illinois		–		4	–	5	–	1
UC Riverside		–		4	–	5	–	0
Tampa		–		4	–	5	–	0
Rose Poly		–		3	–	4	–	1
Hawaii		–		4	–	6	–	0
Portland State		–		4	–	6	–	0
Mississippi Valley State		–		3	–	6	–	0
Lake Forest		–		2	–	5	–	0
Wayne State (MI)		–		2	–	6	–	0

The 1966 Tampa Spartans football team represented the University of Tampa in the 1966 NCAA College Division football season. It was the Spartans' 30th season. The team was led by head coach Sam Bailey, in his third year, and played their home games at Phillips Field in Tampa, Florida. They finished with a record of four wins and five losses (4–5).

== Schedule ==
Date	Opponent	Site	Result	Attendance	Source
September 17	at Tulsa	Skelly Stadium; Tulsa, OK	L 11–57	25,500	
September 24	Bowling Green	Phillips Field; Tampa, FL	W 20–13	9,500	
October 1	at Akron	Rubber Bowl; Akron, OH	W 20–12	9,500–10,000	
October 8	at North Texas State	Fouts Field; Denton, TX	L 6–41	10,000	
October 15	Furman	Phillips Field; Tampa, FL	W 41–2	9,600	
October 29	at Houston	Houston Astrodome; Houston, TX	L 9–48	41,182	
November 5	Northeast Louisiana State	Phillips Field; Tampa, FL	L 0–17	6,000–8,000	
November 12	Buffalo	Phillips Field; Tampa, FL	W 27–8	7,000	
November 19	Eastern Kentucky	Phillips Field; Tampa, FL	L 6–14	6,500	
