= 1966 UC Santa Barbara Gauchos football team =

American college football season

1966 UC Santa Barbara Gauchos football
- Conference: Independent
- Record: 6–4
- Head coach: Jack Curtice (4th season)
- Home stadium: Campus Stadium

1966 NCAA College Division independents football records
	Conf.			Overall
Team	W	L	T	W		L		T
St. Norbert		–		7	–	1	–	1
Parsons		–		9	–	2	–	0
Drake		–		8	–	2	–	0
Northern Illinois		–		8	–	2	–	0
Indiana (PA)		–		7	–	2	–	0
Santa Clara		–		7	–	2	–	0
Cortland		–		6	–	2	–	0
Northeastern		–		6	–	2	–	0
Akron		–		6	–	3	–	0
Northern Michigan		–		6	–	3	–	1
Samford		–		6	–	3	–	1
Carnegie Tech		–		5	–	3	–	0
Eastern Michigan		–		5	–	3	–	1
Ashland		–		5	–	3	–	2
Northern Arizona		–		6	–	4	–	0
UC Santa Barbara		–		6	–	4	–	0
Wheaton (IL)		–		5	–	4	–	0
Boston University		–		5	–	5	–	0
Cal Poly Pomona		–		5	–	5	–	0
Chattanooga		–		5	–	5	–	0
Colorado College		–		4	–	4	–	0
Wabash		–		4	–	4	–	1
Milwaukee		–		4	–	5	–	1
Southern Illinois		–		4	–	5	–	1
UC Riverside		–		4	–	5	–	0
Tampa		–		4	–	5	–	0
Rose Poly		–		3	–	4	–	1
Hawaii		–		4	–	6	–	0
Portland State		–		4	–	6	–	0
Mississippi Valley State		–		3	–	6	–	0
Lake Forest		–		2	–	5	–	0
Wayne State (MI)		–		2	–	6	–	0

The 1966 UC Santa Barbara Gauchos football team represented the University of California, Santa Barbara (UCSB) as an independent during the 1966 NCAA College Division football season. Led by fourth-year head coach Jack Curtice, the Gauchos compiled a record of 6–4 and outscored their opponents 261 to 159. The team played home games at the newly-opened Campus Stadium in Santa Barbara, California.

== Schedule ==
Date	Opponent	Site	Result	Attendance	Source
September 17	Sacramento State	Campus Stadium; Santa Barbara, CA	W 24–9	5,500–6,540	
September 24	Hawaii	Campus Stadium; Santa Barbara, CA	W 24–6	7,000	
October 1	at Nevada	Mackay Stadium; Reno, NV	L 17–33	4,800	
October 8	Whittier	Campus Stadium; Santa Barbara, CA	W 20–0	8,500	
October 15	at Long Beach State	Veterans Memorial Stadium; Long Beach, CA	L 14–48	5,491–5,500	
October 22	Cal Poly Pomona	Campus Stadium; Santa Barbara, CA	W 43–20	4,400–6,000	
October 29	at Valley State	Birmingham High School; Van Nuys, CA	W 38–12	6,000	
November 5	at Santa Clara	Buck Shaw Stadium; Santa Clara, CA	L 7–14	10,050	
November 12	Cal Western (Note: Alliant International University was formed in 2001 via the merger of United States International University (USIU) and California School of Professional Psychology. USIU had been known as California Western University (Cal Western) from 1952 to 1967.)	Campus Stadium; Santa Barbara, CA	W 64–3	11,000	
November 19	Cal Poly	Campus Stadium; Santa Barbara, CA	L 10–14	6,500–7,000	
