= 1966 Chattanooga Moccasins football team =

American college football season

1966 Chattanooga Moccasins football
- Conference: Independent
- Record: 5–5
- Head coach: Scrappy Moore (36th season)
- Home stadium: Chamberlain Field

1966 NCAA College Division independents football records
	Conf.			Overall
Team	W	L	T	W		L		T
St. Norbert		–		7	–	1	–	1
Parsons		–		9	–	2	–	0
Drake		–		8	–	2	–	0
Northern Illinois		–		8	–	2	–	0
Indiana (PA)		–		7	–	2	–	0
Santa Clara		–		7	–	2	–	0
Cortland		–		6	–	2	–	0
Northeastern		–		6	–	2	–	0
Akron		–		6	–	3	–	0
Northern Michigan		–		6	–	3	–	1
Samford		–		6	–	3	–	1
Carnegie Tech		–		5	–	3	–	0
Eastern Michigan		–		5	–	3	–	1
Ashland		–		5	–	3	–	2
Northern Arizona		–		6	–	4	–	0
UC Santa Barbara		–		6	–	4	–	0
Wheaton (IL)		–		5	–	4	–	0
Boston University		–		5	–	5	–	0
Cal Poly Pomona		–		5	–	5	–	0
Chattanooga		–		5	–	5	–	0
Colorado College		–		4	–	4	–	0
Wabash		–		4	–	4	–	1
Milwaukee		–		4	–	5	–	1
Southern Illinois		–		4	–	5	–	1
UC Riverside		–		4	–	5	–	0
Tampa		–		4	–	5	–	0
Rose Poly		–		3	–	4	–	1
Hawaii		–		4	–	6	–	0
Portland State		–		4	–	6	–	0
Mississippi Valley State		–		3	–	6	–	0
Lake Forest		–		2	–	5	–	0
Wayne State (MI)		–		2	–	6	–	0

The 1966 Chattanooga Moccasins football team was an American football team that represented the University of Chattanooga (now known as the University of Tennessee at Chattanooga) during the 1966 NCAA College Division football season. In their 36th year under head coach Scrappy Moore, the team compiled a 5–5 record.

== Schedule ==
Date	Opponent	Rank	Site	Result	Attendance	Source
September 17	at Auburn		Cliff Hare Stadium; Auburn, AL	L 6–20	22,808	
September 24	at Tennessee Tech		Overall Field; Cookeville, TN	W 17–7		
October 1	No. 9 Parsons		Chamberlain Field; Chattanooga, TN	W 19–0		
October 8	Abilene Christian		Chamberlain Field; Chattanooga, TN	W 45–8	7,500	
October 15	No. 3 Middle Tennessee	No. 10	Chamberlain Field; Chattanooga, TN	W 5–0	8,000	
October 22	at Xavier	No. 4	Xavier Stadium; Cincinnati, OH	L 10–27	9,316–10,316	
October 29	Jacksonville State^{†}		Chamberlain Field; Chattanooga, TN	L 10–19		
November 5	at No. 10 (UD) Tennessee		Neyland Stadium; Knoxville, TN	L 10–28	34,551	
November 19	at North Texas State		Fouts Field; Denton, TX	L 7–42	7,000	
November 24	Austin Peay		Chamberlain Field; Chattanooga, TN	W 27–17	10,000	
^{†}Homecoming; Rankings from AP Poll released prior to the game
