= 1966 NCAA College Division football season =

American college football season

- Champion(s): San Diego State (AP, UPI); Tennessee A&I (black)

The 1966 NCAA College Division football season was the 11th season of college football in the United States organized by the National Collegiate Athletic Association at the NCAA College Division level.

== Conference standings ==
1966 Big Sky Conference football standings
	Conf.					Overall
Team	W		L		T	W		L		T
Montana State $^	4	–	0	–	0	8	–	3	–	0
Idaho	3	–	1	–	0	4	–	6	–	0
Weber State	2	–	2	–	0	6	–	3	–	0
Idaho State	1	–	3	–	0	3	–	6	–	0
Montana	0	–	4	–	0	1	–	8	–	0
$ – Conference champion

1966 California Collegiate Athletic Association football standings
	Conf.					Overall
Team	W		L		T	W		L		T
No. 1/1 San Diego State $	5	–	0	–	0	11	–	0	–	0
Fresno State	3	–	2	–	0	7	–	3	–	0
Long Beach State	3	–	2	–	0	6	–	3	–	0
Cal Poly	2	–	3	–	0	6	–	4	–	0
Cal State Los Angeles	2	–	3	–	0	4	–	6	–	0
Valley State	0	–	5	–	0	2	–	7	–	1
$ – Conference champion; Rankings from AP/UPI small college polls

1966 Central Intercollegiate Athletic Association football standings
	Conf.					Overall
Team	W		L		T	W		L		T
Morgan State $	8	–	0	–	0	9	–	0	–	0
North Carolina College	6	–	3	–	0	6	–	3	–	0
Livingstone	5	–	1	–	1	6	–	3	–	1
Johnson C. Smith	3	–	2	–	1	3	–	5	–	1
Hampton	5	–	2	–	0	6	–	3	–	0
Elizabeth City State	5	–	3	–	0	5	–	3	–	0
Maryland State	3	–	3	–	0	5	–	3	–	0
Virginia Union	4	–	4	–	0	4	–	4	–	0
Norfolk State	3	–	5	–	0	3	–	5	–	0
North Carolina A&T	3	–	4	–	0	3	–	6	–	0
Fayetteville State	2	–	3	–	1	3	–	4	–	1
Howard	2	–	3	–	0	4	–	4	–	0
Virginia State	3	–	5	–	0	3	–	5	–	0
Delaware State	2	–	4	–	0	3	–	5	–	0
Winston-Salem State	2	–	5	–	0	2	–	6	–	0
Saint Paul's (VA)	1	–	6	–	1	1	–	7	–	1
Shaw	0	–	7	–	2	0	–	7	–	2
$ – Conference champion

1966 Central Intercollegiate Conference football standings
	Conf.					Overall
Team	W		L		T	W		L		T
No. 15 Fort Hays State +	3	–	1	–	0	7	–	2	–	0
No. 14 Pittsburg State +	3	–	1	–	0	7	–	2	–	0
Emporia State	2	–	2	–	0	3	–	6	–	0
Washburn	1	–	3	–	0	2	–	7	–	0
Omaha	1	–	3	–	0	1	–	9	–	0
$ – Conference champion; Rankings from NAIA poll

1966 College Athletic Conference football standings
	Conf.					Overall
Team	W		L		T	W		L		T
Washington University $	4	–	0	–	0	7	–	2	–	0
Centre	2	–	2	–	0	7	–	2	–	0
Southwestern (TN)	2	–	2	–	0	4	–	4	–	0
Washington and Lee	1	–	3	–	0	2	–	5	–	2
Sewanee	1	–	3	–	0	2	–	6	–	0
$ – Conference champion

1966 College Conference of Illinois football standings
	Conf.					Overall
Team	W		L		T	W		L		T
Augustana (IL) $	5	–	1	–	0	6	–	2	–	1
Carthage	4	–	2	–	0	6	–	2	–	0
North Central (IL)	4	–	2	–	0	6	–	3	–	0
Illinois Wesleyan	4	–	2	–	0	5	–	3	–	0
Carroll (WI)	2	–	4	–	0	5	–	4	–	0
Millikin	2	–	4	–	0	3	–	5	–	0
North Park	0	–	6	–	0	0	–	7	–	1
$ – Conference champion

1966 Eastern Football Conference football standings
	Conf.					Overall
Team	W		L		T	W		L		T
Southern Connecticut State $	4	–	1	–	0	6	–	3	–	0
Bridgeport	3	–	1	–	0	7	–	3	–	0
Central Connecticut State	3	–	2	–	0	7	–	2	–	0
Trenton State	3	–	2	–	0	4	–	4	–	0
Montclair State	1	–	4	–	0	3	–	5	–	0
Glassboro State	0	–	4	–	0	1	–	7	–	1
$ – Conference champion

1966 Far Western Conference football standings
	Conf.					Overall
Team	W		L		T	W		L		T
Sacramento State $	6	–	0	–	0	8	–	2	–	0
San Francisco State	5	–	1	–	0	7	–	3	–	0
Nevada	3	–	3	–	0	6	–	3	–	0
UC Davis	3	–	3	–	0	5	–	5	–	0
Humboldt State	2	–	4	–	0	4	–	6	–	0
Chico State	1	–	5	–	0	4	–	6	–	0
Cal State Hayward	1	–	5	–	0	2	–	8	–	0
$ – Conference champion

1966 Gulf States Conference football standings
	Conf.					Overall
Team	W		L		T	W		L		T
No. 4 Northwestern State $	5	–	0	–	0	9	–	0	–	0
Southwestern Louisiana	3	–	2	–	0	6	–	4	–	0
McNeese State	3	–	2	–	0	5	–	5	–	0
Northeast Louisiana State	2	–	3	–	0	7	–	3	–	0
Southeastern Louisiana	1	–	4	–	0	3	–	6	–	0
Louisiana Tech	1	–	4	–	0	1	–	9	–	0
$ – Conference champion; Rankings from NAIA poll

1966 Hoosier Conference football standings
	Conf.					Overall
Team	W		L		T	W		L		T
Manchester (IN) +	4	–	1	–	0	5	–	4	–	0
Franklin (IN) +	4	–	1	–	0	4	–	5	–	0
Taylor	3	–	2	–	0	5	–	3	–	0
Hanover	3	–	2	–	0	4	–	5	–	0
Anderson (IN)	1	–	4	–	0	1	–	7	–	0
Indiana Central	0	–	5	–	0	1	–	8	–	0
+ – Conference co-champions

1966 Independent College Athletic Conference football standings
	Conf.					Overall
Team	W		L		T	W		L		T
Alfred $	3	–	0	–	0	6	–	1	–	1
St. Lawrence	2	–	1	–	0	2	–	6	–	0
RPI	1	–	1	–	0	5	–	4	–	0
Hobart	1	–	3	–	0	3	–	5	–	0
Union (NY)	1	–	3	–	0	1	–	6	–	1
$ – Conference champion

1966 Indiana Collegiate Conference football standings
	Conf.					Overall
Team	W		L		T	W		L		T
Ball State $	5	–	0	–	1	7	–	0	–	1
Indiana State	4	–	2	–	0	6	–	2	–	0
Butler	4	–	2	–	0	4	–	5	–	0
Saint Joseph's (IN)	3	–	3	–	0	4	–	4	–	0
Evansville	2	–	3	–	1	4	–	4	–	1
DePauw	1	–	5	–	0	3	–	6	–	0
Valparaiso	1	–	5	–	0	3	–	6	–	0
$ – Conference champion

1966 Interstate Intercollegiate Athletic Conference football standings
	Conf.					Overall
Team	W		L		T	W		L		T
Central Michigan $	3	–	0	–	0	5	–	5	–	0
Eastern Illinois	1	–	1	–	1	1	–	6	–	1
Western Illinois	1	–	2	–	0	1	–	7	–	1
Illinois State	0	–	2	–	1	2	–	5	–	2
$ – Conference champion

1966 Iowa Conference football standings
	Conf.					Overall
Team	W		L		T	W		L		T
No. 5 Central (IA) $^	7	–	0	–	0	9	–	1	–	0
Luther	6	–	1	–	0	7	–	2	–	0
Upper Iowa	5	–	2	–	0	7	–	3	–	0
Buena Vista	4	–	3	–	0	6	–	3	–	0
Dubuque	3	–	4	–	0	5	–	4	–	0
Simpson (IA)	2	–	5	–	0	3	–	5	–	0
Wartburg	1	–	6	–	0	1	–	8	–	0
William Penn	0	–	7	–	0	0	–	9	–	0
$ – Conference champion; ^ – NAIA playoff participant; Rankings from NAIA poll

1966 Little Three Conference football standings
	Conf.					Overall
Team	W		L		T	W		L		T
Wesleyan $	2	–	0	–	0	6	–	2	–	0
Amherst	1	–	1	–	0	6	–	2	–	0
Williams	0	–	2	–	0	6	–	2	–	0
$ – Conference champion

1966 Lone Star Conference football standings
	Conf.					Overall
Team	W		L		T	W		L		T
East Texas State $	4	–	1	–	2	5	–	3	–	2
Southwest Texas State	4	–	2	–	1	7	–	2	–	1
Sam Houston State	4	–	2	–	1	6	–	3	–	1
Sul Ross	3	–	3	–	1	6	–	3	–	1
Stephen F. Austin	3	–	3	–	1	5	–	3	–	1
Howard Payne	3	–	3	–	1	5	–	5	–	1
Texas A&I	3	–	4	–	0	5	–	5	–	0
McMurry	0	–	6	–	1	1	–	8	–	1
$ – Conference champion

1966 Maine Intercollegiate Athletic Association football standings
	Conf.					Overall
Team	W		L		T	W		L		T
Bates $	2	–	0	–	0	6	–	2	–	0
Bowdoin	1	–	1	–	0	1	–	6	–	0
Colby	0	–	2	–	0	1	–	7	–	0
$ – Conference champion

1966 Mason–Dixon Conference football standings
	Conf.					Overall
Team	W		L		T	W		L		T
Hampden–Sydney $	5	–	0	–	0	5	–	4	–	1
Randolph–Macon	4	–	1	–	0	7	–	1	–	1
Western Maryland	2	–	2	–	0	4	–	5	–	0
Bridgewater	2	–	3	–	0	3	–	4	–	0
Shepherd	1	–	3	–	0	1	–	8	–	0
Johns Hopkins	0	–	2	–	0	0	–	6	–	2
Gallaudet	0	–	3	–	0	1	–	6	–	0
$ – Conference champion; Conference standings were based on the Dickinson Scoring System.

1966 Michigan Intercollegiate Athletic Association football standings
	Conf.					Overall
Team	W		L		T	W		L		T
Albion $	4	–	1	–	0	7	–	2	–	0
Olivet	3	–	2	–	0	5	–	3	–	0
Alma	3	–	2	–	0	5	–	4	–	0
Hope	2	–	3	–	0	3	–	4	–	0
Kalamazoo	2	–	3	–	0	3	–	5	–	0
Adrian	1	–	4	–	0	3	–	5	–	0
$ – Conference champion

1966 Middle Atlantic Conference football standings
	Conf.					Overall
Team	W		L		T	W		L		T
University Division
Delaware x	6	–	0	–	0	6	–	3	–	0
Gettysburg	4	–	2	–	0	7	–	2	–	0
Temple	2	–	2	–	0	6	–	3	–	0
Lafayette	2	–	3	–	0	3	–	6	–	0
Bucknell	2	–	3	–	0	4	–	5	–	0
Hofstra	1	–	3	–	0	2	–	8	–	0
Lehigh	0	–	4	–	0	0	–	9	–	0
Northern College Division
Wilkes x	7	–	0	–	0	8	–	0	–	0
Upsala	6	–	1	–	0	6	–	2	–	0
Delaware Valley	4	–	2	–	0	5	–	3	–	0
Lycoming	4	–	3	–	0	4	–	4	–	0
Moravian	4	–	4	–	1	4	–	4	–	1
Albright	4	–	4	–	0	4	–	5	–	0
Juniata	3	–	3	–	0	4	–	4	–	0
Wagner	1	–	3	–	1	2	–	6	–	1
Susquehanna *	1	–	2	–	0	3	–	6	–	0
Southern College Division
Swarthmore x	6	–	0	–	1	6	–	0	–	1
Drexel	4	–	1	–	0	6	–	1	–	1
Franklin & Marshall	3	–	2	–	2	3	–	3	–	2
Dickinson	4	–	3	–	1	4	–	3	–	1
Western Maryland	2	–	3	–	0	4	–	5	–	0
Ursinus	2	–	4	–	1	2	–	5	–	1
Muhlenberg	2	–	6	–	1	2	–	6	–	1
Lebanon Valley	2	–	6	–	0	2	–	6	–	0
Pennsylvania Military	2	–	6	–	0	2	–	7	–	0
Haverford	1	–	5	–	0	1	–	6	–	0
Johns Hopkins	0	–	4	–	2	0	–	6	–	2
West Chester *	0	–	0	–	0	8	–	1	–	0
x – Division champion/co-champions; * – Ineligible for championship due to insufficient conference games

1966 Midwest Conference football standings
	Conf.					Overall
Team	W		L		T	W		L		T
Lawrence +	7	–	1	–	0	7	–	1	–	0
Ripon +	7	–	1	–	0	7	–	1	–	0
St. Olaf +	7	–	1	–	0	7	–	1	–	0
Beloit	5	–	3	–	0	5	–	3	–	0
Carleton	3	–	5	–	0	3	–	5	–	0
Coe	3	–	5	–	0	3	–	5	–	0
Cornell (IA)	3	–	5	–	0	3	–	5	–	0
Grinnell	2	–	6	–	0	2	–	6	–	0
Monmouth (IL)	2	–	6	–	0	2	–	6	–	0
Knox	1	–	7	–	0	1	–	7	–	0
+ – Conference co-champions

1966 Midwestern Conference football standings
	Conf.					Overall
Team	W		L		T	W		L		T
No. 1 Tennessee A&I $	2	–	0	–	0	10	–	0	–	0
Lincoln (MO)	1	–	1	–	0	7	–	2	–	0
Kentucky State	0	–	2	–	0	3	–	4	–	1
$ – Conference champion; Rankings from New Pittsburgh Courier

1966 Minnesota Intercollegiate Athletic Conference football standings
	Conf.					Overall
Team	W		L		T	W		L		T
No. 9 Hamline $	6	–	1	–	0	8	–	1	–	0
Gustavus Adolphus	4	–	1	–	2	5	–	2	–	2
Minnesota–Duluth	4	–	2	–	1	5	–	3	–	1
Concordia (MN)	4	–	3	–	0	5	–	3	–	0
Saint John's (MN)	3	–	3	–	1	4	–	3	–	1
Augsburg	3	–	4	–	0	4	–	4	–	1
St. Thomas (MN)	2	–	5	–	0	2	–	6	–	1
Macalester	0	–	7	–	0	2	–	7	–	0
$ – Conference champion; Rankings from NAIA poll

1966 Missouri Intercollegiate Athletic Association football standings
	Conf.					Overall
Team	W		L		T	W		L		T
SW Missouri State $	5	–	0	–	0	7	–	4	–	0
SE Missouri State	4	–	1	–	0	5	–	5	–	0
NW Missouri State	3	–	2	–	0	4	–	5	–	0
Central Missouri State	2	–	3	–	0	4	–	5	–	0
Missouri–Rolla	1	–	4	–	0	3	–	6	–	0
NE Missouri State	0	–	5	–	0	3	–	6	–	0
$ – Conference champion

1966 North Central Conference football standings
	Conf.					Overall
Team	W		L		T	W		L		T
North Dakota +	5	–	1	–	0	8	–	2	–	0
North Dakota State +	5	–	1	–	0	8	–	2	–	0
State College of Iowa	4	–	2	–	0	4	–	5	–	0
Augustana (SD)	2	–	4	–	0	5	–	4	–	0
South Dakota	2	–	4	–	0	5	–	5	–	0
South Dakota State	2	–	4	–	0	3	–	7	–	0
Morningside	1	–	5	–	0	3	–	6	–	0
$ – Conference champion

1966 Ohio Athletic Conference football standings
	Conf.					Overall
Team	W		L		T	W		L		T
No. 7 Muskingum +	6	–	0	–	0	9	–	1	–	0
Wittenberg +	4	–	0	–	0	8	–	1	–	0
Denison	7	–	1	–	0	8	–	1	–	0
Capital	4	–	2	–	0	6	–	2	–	0
Ohio Wesleyan	4	–	2	–	0	6	–	3	–	0
Mount Union	4	–	4	–	0	4	–	5	–	0
Hiram	3	–	4	–	0	3	–	5	–	0
Marietta	2	–	3	–	0	4	–	4	–	1
Heidelberg	2	–	3	–	0	3	–	4	–	1
Baldwin–Wallace	2	–	3	–	0	3	–	5	–	0
Oberlin	2	–	4	–	0	2	–	6	–	0
Wooster	1	–	5	–	0	1	–	8	–	0
Otterbein	1	–	6	–	0	2	–	7	–	0
Kenyon	0	–	5	–	0	1	–	8	–	0
+ – Conference co-champions; Rankings from AP small college poll

1966 Ohio Valley Conference football standings
	Conf.					Overall
Team	W		L		T	W		L		T
Morehead State $	6	–	1	–	0	7	–	2	–	0
Middle Tennessee	5	–	2	–	0	7	–	3	–	0
Austin Peay	4	–	3	–	0	6	–	4	–	0
No. 16 Eastern Kentucky	4	–	3	–	0	7	–	3	–	0
Tennessee Tech	4	–	3	–	0	5	–	5	–	0
Western Kentucky	3	–	4	–	0	5	–	5	–	0
East Tennessee State	2	–	5	–	0	3	–	6	–	0
Murray State	0	–	7	–	0	0	–	10	–	0
$ – Conference champion; Rankings from UPI small college poll

1966 Pennsylvania State College Athletic Conference football standings
	Conf.					Overall
Team	W		L		T	W		L		T
East Division
West Chester xy	6	–	0	–	0	8	–	3	–	0
East Stroudsburg	4	–	2	–	0	4	–	4	–	0
Cheyney	3	–	3	–	0	4	–	3	–	0
Bloomsburg	3	–	3	–	0	4	–	4	–	0
Mansfield	2	–	4	–	0	4	–	5	–	0
Millersville	2	–	4	–	0	4	–	5	–	0
Kutztown	1	–	5	–	0	1	–	6	–	1
West Division
No. 6 Clarion xy$	5	–	0	–	0	10	–	0	–	0
California (PA)	4	–	1	–	0	4	–	5	–	0
Shippensburg	2	–	3	–	0	4	–	5	–	0
Lock Haven	2	–	3	–	0	2	–	7	–	0
Slippery Rock	1	–	3	–	1	3	–	5	–	1
Edinboro	0	–	4	–	1	1	–	6	–	1
Championship: Clarion 28, West Chester 26
$ – Conference champion; x – Division champion/co-champions; y – Championship game participant; Rankings from NAIA poll

1966 Prairie College Conference football standings
	Conf.					Overall
Team	W		L		T	W		L		T
Principia $	2	–	0	–	0	7	–	1	–	0
Rose Poly	1	–	1	–	0	3	–	4	–	1
Illinois College	0	–	2	–	0	4	–	4	–	0
$ – Conference champion

1966 Presidents' Athletic Conference football standings
	Conf.					Overall
Team	W		L		T	W		L		T
Bethany (WV) $	5	–	0	–	1	6	–	0	–	1
John Carroll	4	–	1	–	0	4	–	3	–	0
Allegheny	3	–	2	–	0	4	–	3	–	0
Thiel	2	–	2	–	1	3	–	4	–	1
Case Tech	1	–	4	–	0	2	–	5	–	0
Western Reserve	1	–	4	–	0	1	–	6	–	0
Washington & Jefferson	1	–	4	–	0	1	–	6	–	0
$ – Conference champion

1966 Rocky Mountain Conference football standings
	Conf.					Overall
Team	W		L		T	W		L		T
Western State (CO) $	3	–	0	–	0	6	–	2	–	0
Adams State	2	–	1	–	0	8	–	2	–	0
Colorado Mines	1	–	2	–	0	5	–	5	–	0
Colorado State–Greeley	0	–	3	–	0	3	–	7	–	0
$ – Conference champion

1966 Southern California Intercollegiate Athletic Conference football standings
	Conf.					Overall
Team	W		L		T	W		L		T
Redlands $	4	–	1	–	0	7	–	3	–	0
Pomona	3	–	1	–	1	6	–	2	–	1
Whittier	3	–	1	–	1	3	–	5	–	2
Occidental	3	–	2	–	0	5	–	4	–	0
Claremont-Mudd	1	–	4	–	0	1	–	8	–	0
Caltech	0	–	5	–	0	0	–	9	–	0
$ – Conference champion; Caltech forfeited to Whittier.

1966 Southland Conference football standings
	Conf.					Overall
Team	W		L		T	W		L		T
Arlington State +	3	–	1	–	0	6	–	4	–	0
Lamar Tech +	3	–	1	–	0	6	–	4	–	0
No. 6 Arkansas State	2	–	2	–	0	7	–	2	–	0
Trinity (TX)	2	–	2	–	0	5	–	4	–	0
Abilene Christian	0	–	4	–	0	4	–	6	–	0
+ – Conference co-champions; Rankings from AP small college poll

1966 Southwestern Athletic Conference football standings
	Conf.					Overall
Team	W		L		T	W		L		T
Southern +	5	–	1	–	1	7	–	2	–	1
No. 13 Grambling +	5	–	1	–	1	6	–	2	–	1
Texas Southern	4	–	2	–	1	5	–	4	–	1
Jackson State	3	–	3	–	1	5	–	3	–	1
Prairie View A&M	3	–	3	–	1	5	–	3	–	1
Alcorn A&M	2	–	3	–	2	5	–	3	–	2
Arkansas AM&N	2	–	4	–	1	4	–	5	–	1
Wiley	0	–	7	–	0	0	–	8	–	0
+ – Conference co-champions; Rankings from NAIA poll

1966 Wisconsin State University Conference football standings
	Conf.					Overall
Team	W		L		T	W		L		T
No. 2 Whitewater State $^	8	–	0	–	0	10	–	1	–	0
River Falls State	6	–	1	–	1	6	–	2	–	1
Stevens Point State	6	–	2	–	0	6	–	3	–	0
La Crosse State	5	–	3	–	0	6	–	3	–	0
Platteville State	3	–	4	–	1	4	–	4	–	1
Oshkosh State	3	–	5	–	0	3	–	6	–	0
Stout State	2	–	6	–	0	3	–	6	–	0
Eau Claire State	1	–	7	–	0	1	–	7	–	1
Superior State	1	–	7	–	0	1	–	8	–	0
$ – Conference champion; ^ – NAIA playoff participant; Rankings from NAIA poll

1966 Yankee Conference football standings
	Conf.					Overall
Team	W		L		T	W		L		T
UMass $	5	–	0	–	0	6	–	3	–	0
Vermont	3	–	2	–	0	6	–	2	–	0
Connecticut	2	–	2	–	1	2	–	6	–	1
Maine	2	–	3	–	0	4	–	5	–	0
Rhode Island	1	–	3	–	1	1	–	7	–	1
New Hampshire	1	–	4	–	0	2	–	6	–	0
$ – Conference champion

1966 NCAA College Division independents football records
	Conf.			Overall
Team	W	L	T	W		L		T
St. Norbert		–		7	–	1	–	1
Parsons		–		9	–	2	–	0
Drake		–		8	–	2	–	0
Northern Illinois		–		8	–	2	–	0
Indiana (PA)		–		7	–	2	–	0
Santa Clara		–		7	–	2	–	0
Cortland		–		6	–	2	–	0
Northeastern		–		6	–	2	–	0
Akron		–		6	–	3	–	0
Northern Michigan		–		6	–	3	–	1
Samford		–		6	–	3	–	1
Carnegie Tech		–		5	–	3	–	0
Eastern Michigan		–		5	–	3	–	1
Ashland		–		5	–	3	–	2
Northern Arizona		–		6	–	4	–	0
UC Santa Barbara		–		6	–	4	–	0
Wheaton (IL)		–		5	–	4	–	0
Boston University		–		5	–	5	–	0
Cal Poly Pomona		–		5	–	5	–	0
Chattanooga		–		5	–	5	–	0
Colorado College		–		4	–	4	–	0
Wabash		–		4	–	4	–	1
Milwaukee		–		4	–	5	–	1
Southern Illinois		–		4	–	5	–	1
UC Riverside		–		4	–	5	–	0
Tampa		–		4	–	5	–	0
Rose Poly		–		3	–	4	–	1
Hawaii		–		4	–	6	–	0
Portland State		–		4	–	6	–	0
Mississippi Valley State		–		3	–	6	–	0
Lake Forest		–		2	–	5	–	0
Wayne State (MI)		–		2	–	6	–	0

== Rankings ==
College Division teams (also referred to as "small college") were ranked in polls by the AP (a panel of writers) and by UPI (coaches). The national champion(s) for each season were determined by the final poll rankings, published at or near the end of the regular season, before any bowl games were played.

=== Small college final polls ===
In 1966, both services ranked San Diego State (10–0) at the top, with Montana State (8–2) ranked second by UPI and third by the AP, led by quarterbacks Don Horn and Dennis Erickson, respectively. They later met in the Camellia Bowl in Sacramento, California, with San Diego State prevailing, 28–7.

United Press International (coaches) final poll
Published on November 30

Rank	School	Record	No. 1 votes	Total points
1	San Diego State	10–0	30	336
2	Montana State	8–2	3	272
3	Tennessee A&I	9–0	19	262
4	Northwestern State	9–0		166
5	North Dakota	7–2		161
6	New Mexico Highlands	8–1		122
7	Muskingum	9–0		109
8	North Dakota State	8–2		104
9	Weber State	6–3		85
10	UMass	6–3		46

Associated Press (writers) final poll
Published on December 1

Rank	School	Record	No. 1 votes	Total points
1	San Diego State	10–0	14	158
2	Tennessee A&I	9–0	2	126
3	Montana State	8–2		113
4	Northwestern State	9–0		72
5	Parson	9–1		70
6	Arkansas State	7–2		43
7	Muskingum	9–0		41
8	North Dakota	7–2		39
9	North Dakota State	8–2		32
T10	Waynesburg	9–0		31
T10	Weber State	6–3		31

== Bowl games ==
The postseason consisted of four bowls as regional finals, played on December 10.

Bowl	Region	Location	Winning team		Losing team		Ref
Tangerine	East	Orlando, Florida	Morgan State	14	West Chester	6	
Grantland Rice	Mideast	Murfreesboro, Tennessee	Tennessee A&I	34	Muskingum	7	
Pecan	Midwest	Abilene, Texas	North Dakota	42	Parsons	24	
Camellia	West	Sacramento, California	San Diego State	28	Montana State	7	

== See also ==
- 1966 NCAA University Division football season
- 1966 NAIA football season
