= Don Coryell =

American football coach (1924–2010)

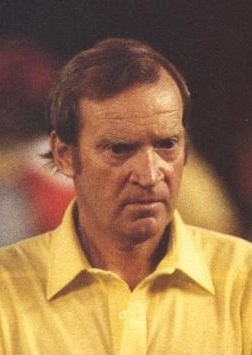
- Coryell with the San Diego Chargers, c. 1984

Personal information
- Born: October 17, 1924; Seattle, Washington, U.S.
- Died: July 1, 2010 (aged 85); La Mesa, California, U.S.

Career information
- College: Washington

Career history
- Washington (1950) Assistant coach; Punahou (HI) (1951) Assistant coach; Farrington HS (HI) (1952) Head coach; UBC (1953–1954) Head coach; Wenatchee Valley (1955) Head coach; Fort Ord (1956) Head coach; Whittier (1957–1959) Head coach; USC (1960) Assistant coach; San Diego State (1961–1972) Head coach; St. Louis Cardinals (1973–1977) Head coach; San Diego Chargers (1978–1986) Head coach

Awards and highlights
- AP NFL Coach of the Year (1974); Los Angeles Chargers Hall of Fame; San Diego Chargers 40th Anniversary Team; San Diego Chargers 50th Anniversary Team; 3× NCAA College Division champion (1966–1968); 3× SCIAC champion (1957–1959); 3× CCAA champion (1962, 1966–1967); 3× PCAA champion (1969–1970, 1972)

Career coaching statistics
- Regular season: 114–89–1 (.561)
- Postseason: 3–6 (.333)
- Career: NFL: 117–95–1 (.552); NCAA: 127–24–3 (.834)
- Coaching profile at Pro Football Reference
- Pro Football Hall of Fame
- College Football Hall of Fame

Donald David Coryell (/kɔːrˈjɜːl/ kor-YEL; October 17, 1924 – July 1, 2010) was an American football coach. He coached in high school, college, and the professional ranks; his most notable NCAA post was with the San Diego State Aztecs for 12 seasons from 1961 to 1972 before he moved on to the National Football League (NFL), first with the St. Louis Cardinals from 1973 to 1977 and then the San Diego Chargers from 1978 to 1986. Well known for his innovations in football's passing game, in particular the Air Coryell offense he created with the Chargers, Coryell was the first head coach to win more than 100 games at both the collegiate and professional levels. He was inducted into the Chargers Hall of Fame in 1994, the College Football Hall of Fame in 1999, and the Pro Football Hall of Fame in 2023.

Born in Seattle, Coryell served in the U.S. military during World War II and played college football before becoming a coach upon his graduation. Between 1950 and 1960 he served as either a head coach or assistant at eight different institutions, overseeing rapid improvements in most cases and winning three conference titles with the Whittier Poets. He followed this with a 12-year stint at San Diego State, from 1961 to 1972, in which he led them to seven conference titles, three NCAA College Division titles and victory in three bowl games. During this time, future Pro Football Hall of Fame coaches John Madden and Joe Gibbs served on his staff as assistants.

Coryell moved into professional coaching in 1973 with the St. Louis Cardinals, where he stayed for five years, leading the team to 10-win seasons three times, including the only two divisional titles of their 28-year stint in St. Louis. He left after a dispute with Cardinals owner Bill Bidwill and joined the San Diego Chargers in 1978, leading them to three division titles over the course of eight years. During his time with the Chargers, his teams led the NFL in passing yards six years in a row and seven times in total, while also leading the league in total yardage five times and scoring three times. Coryell retired from coaching after being fired following a 1–7 start in 1986.

== Early life ==
Don Coryell was born October 17, 1924, to Julia and George Coryell in Seattle, Washington. He was the youngest of four children, all boys. Don initially had no middle name, but adopted David at his mother's suggestion, as the biblical story of David and Goliath was his favorite as a child.

Coryell graduated from Lincoln High School in 1943 while World War II was in process, and immediately enlisted in the United States Army. He joined the newly-formed 86th Mountain Infantry, a regiment of ski troops training at Camp Hale in Colorado; it would later be combined with two others to form the 10th Mountain Division. While the bulk of his group joined the war in Italy, Coryell was promoted to platoon sergeant and remained in America as an instructor. Preferring to see combat, he applied for officer's school; he was eventually sent to Japan, but only after the war had ended. Coryell later trained as a paratrooper, joined the 11th Airborne Division and rose to the rank of first lieutenant before being discharged at the age of 21.

After leaving the service, Coryell enrolled at the University of Washington, studying physical education and earning his bachelor's and master's degrees. He played as a defensive back for the Washington Huskies, lettering as a senior in 1949 and playing in that year's Hula Bowl. He also competed as a boxer, winning the university's light heavyweight crown in 1947 and 1948 before being defeated in the heavyweight title fight the following year.

== Early coaching career (1950–1960) ==
Coryell changed jobs frequently during his first decade as a coach. While earning a master's degree at the University of Washington, he remained with the Huskies as an assistant coach. After completing his studies, Coryell took a job at Punahou School in Honolulu, Hawaii, where he served as both an assistant coach and a biology teacher. The following year, 1952, he moved to another Honolulu school, Farrington High School, for his first head coaching post. He improved a team that had failed to win a game the previous year. In 1953, Coryell moved to the University of British Columbia in Canada, where he compiled a 2–16 record over two seasons. The university did not prioritize sporting success; when Coryell earned his first victory it ended a two-year winless drought for the team, and prompted the Vancouver Sun to write, "Don Coryell has carved himself a niche in UBC's not-too-crowded football hall of fame."

In 1955, Coryell accepted an offer from Wenatchee Junior College in his home state of Washington. The team had gone winless the previous year. Coryell bolstered his squad by recruiting nine players from Canada and seven from Hawaii and led Wenatchee to a 7–0–1 record, before they lost, 33–6, to Bakersfield in the Potato Bowl. (Note: This Potato Bowl was a junior college bowl game discontinued in 2006, and is unrelated to the later Famous Idaho Potato Bowl.) During that year, Coryell began using what he called the "IT formation", combining elements of the I formation and the T formation, with the intention of having his backs receive the ball closer to the line of scrimmage. This is today known as the power I formation.

Coryell changed jobs in both 1956 and 1957. First, he left Wenatchee for a military team at Fort Ord. Again making use of the I formation, he led them to the service football championship with a 9–0 record. Next, he successfully applied for a vacancy in Whittier, California, replacing George Allen as the head coach of the Whittier Poets, whose most recent Southern California Intercollegiate Athletic Conference (SCIAC) title had come five years earlier. Coryell remained at Whittier for three seasons (1957–59), winning SCIAC championships each time. The Poets were unbeaten in conference play during his tenure, going 12–0–1 against SCIAC teams and 23–5–1 overall. Coryell adopted a flexible approach to offensive play, based on the abilities of his personnel. Early on in his time with Whittier, he used a run-based attack because his starting quarterback was injured and his backups were less accomplished. Later, Coryell converted a tailback into a talented quarterback and began passing more often. He also kept the program within its budget, which his predecessor had failed to do.

In 1960, he was an assistant coach under John McKay for the USC Trojans, where the I formation would be its signature offense for decades. While the origin of the I formation is unclear, Coryell was one of its pioneers.

== San Diego State Aztecs (1961–1972) ==
Coryell's next job was as the head coach of the San Diego State Aztecs, who had struggled prior to his appointment. In 1960, the Aztecs had posted a 1–6–1 record, and lost all five games in their conference, the California Collegiate Athletic Association (CCAA). The offense produced under 200 yards per game, and scored only 53 points in eight games. Only 6,000 fans were in attendance for a 60–0 home defeat by an inter-state rival, the Fresno State Bulldogs. The Aztecs had failed to win the CCAA or make a bowl game since 1951.

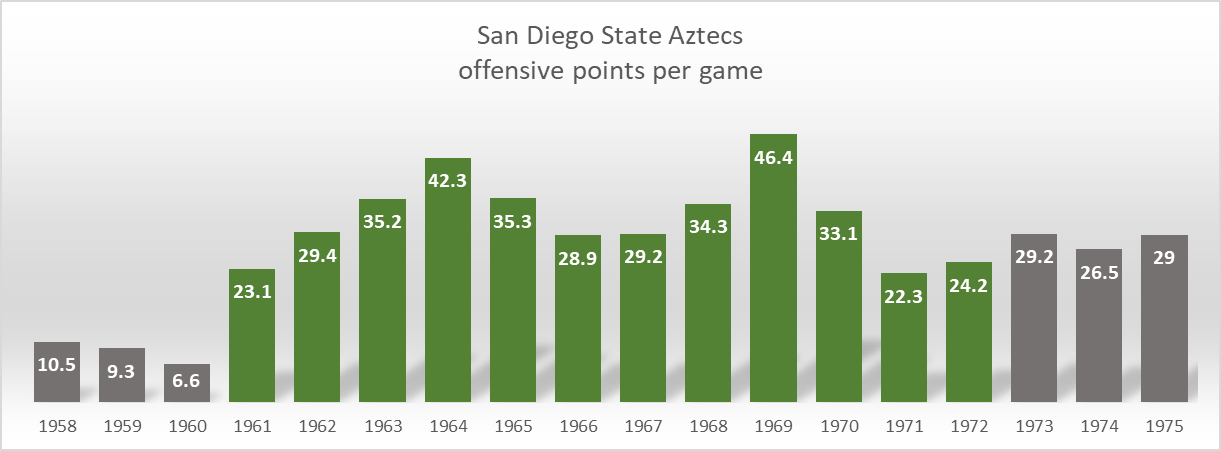
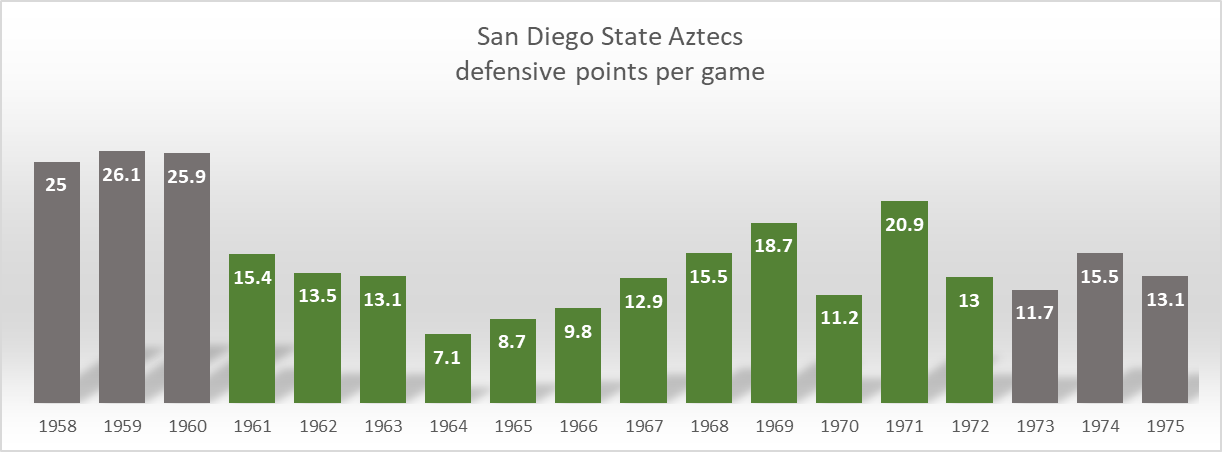
The Aztecs' points scored per game (above) and points conceded per game (below), from three years before Coryell's arrival at San Diego State to three years after his departure. Seasons where Coryell was the head coach are highlighted in green.

Coryell was named the Aztecs' new head coach on January 11, 1961, and predicted that San Diego State would be a leading small college by 1963. He installed the I formation, and instituted a policy of recruiting juniors who had played for two years at junior colleges in Southern California, reasoning that this policy allowed the Aztecs to study their recruits and be sure of their abilities before signing them, avoiding wasting any of their limited budget on sub-standard players. Among his first crop of junior recruits was future Hall of Fame head coach Joe Gibbs. The Aztecs improved rapidly under Coryell, as he led the team to a 7–2–1 record in his first season. They followed with their first CCAA title for a decade, going 8–2 overall and 6–0 in their division. The decisive game came against Fresno State, who had won the CCAA the previous four consecutive seasons. Before a capacity crowd of 13,000, the Aztecs ended an eight-game losing streak to their rivals, winning 29–25. Coryell was carried from the field by his players at the end of the game. At this point, his offense was based primarily around the run; in the game against Fresno State, the Aztecs gained only 9 yards passing against 269 rushing. Coryell's success led to speculation that he might take a role with the San Diego Chargers or a larger college, but he affirmed his intention to stay with the Aztecs. San Diego State went 7–2 in 1963, earning a share of the CCAA title. They scored at least 30 points in each of their first seven games.

In 1964, Coryell recruited another future Hall of Fame head coach, this time appointing John Madden as his defensive coordinator. Gibbs also moved from a playing role to a graduate assistant coaching position; both would remain on Coryell's staff for three years. The Aztecs went 8–2 in 1964, scoring at least 44 points in all eight of their victories and conceding only 71 points in their ten games. The team used a balanced offense, with Rod Dowhower at quarterback, Gary Garrison the leading receiver and Jim Allison at running back. They were unable to continue their run of CCAA titles, with a 7–0 loss to the eventual champions Cal State proving costly. The Aztecs again finished 8–2 in 1965. They scored 40-plus points in six games and shut their opponents out in five, but lost two conference games and finished third in the CCAA.

San Diego State returned to the top of the CCAA in 1966, posting a perfect 11–0 record. They were also voted the No. 1 small college side by both the UPI and the Associated Press, and won the Camellia Bowl. Prompted by the ability of quarterback Don Horn Coryell shifted his offense's emphasis towards the pass, adopting the pro set formation and using multiple wingbacks in passing situations. San Diego State began the season expected to vie with the Long Beach State 49ers for the conference title; the Aztecs beat Long Beach State 21–18 on October 8 to set up the CCAA title win. Four weeks later they were ranked No. 2 in the UPI and AP small college polls and faced No.1 North Dakota State, winning 36–0 to take over the No. 1 spot themselves. Anticipating muddy conditions in the season-ending Camellia Bowl, Coryell had his offense practice in the shotgun formation; the conditions were as expected, and San Diego State defeated Montana State 28–7.

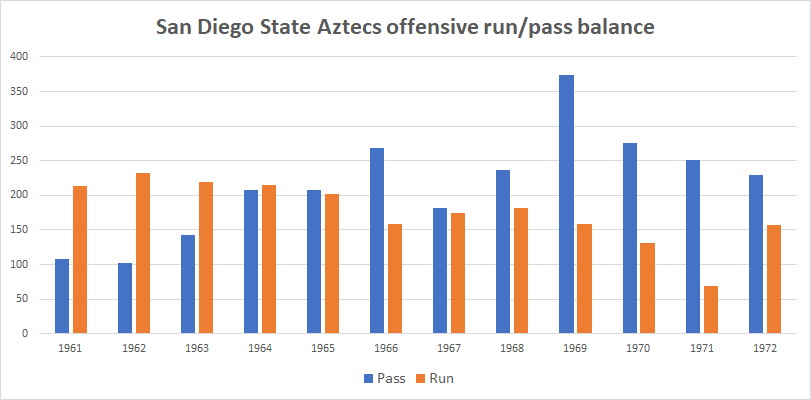
The Aztecs' average passing yards per game (in blue) and average rushing yards per game (in orange), for each season that Coryell was the head coach

Coryell came close to leaving the Aztecs in 1967, but ultimately remained and again led them to a CCAA title, the No. 1 small college ranking and victory in the Camellia Bowl, this time with a 10–1 record. He was approached by the University of Arizona to coach the Wildcats, a post commanding a much higher salary than San Diego State could afford. When Coryell mentioned to Jack Murphy (a sportswriter for the San Diego Union) that he was inclined to accept Arizona's offer, Murphy approached the Greater San Diego Sports Association and they agreed to supplement Coryell's salary. This was enough to persuade him to stay. On the field, Horn had graduated, and his replacements were less suited to a pass-oriented offense, so Coryell used a more balanced system. Playing in the newly opened San Diego Stadium and drawing crowds that topped 40,000, the Aztecs won their first nine games. When they eventually lost their tenth, it ended a 25-game winning streak. Two weeks after that defeat, Coryell had to replace six defensive starters due to eligibility issues, but his rebuilt team convincingly won their second straight Camellia Bowl, 27–6 against San Francisco State. During the season, the Aztecs averaged a higher attendance in San Diego Stadium than the Chargers.

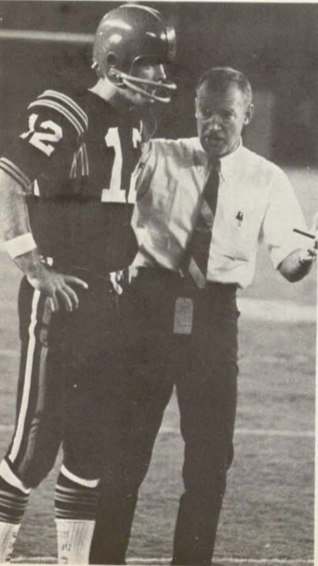
Coryell passed more with Dennis Shaw as his quarterback in 1968.

In 1968 and 1969 Coryell had future NFL quarterback Dennis Shaw as his starter, and his offense shifted back towards the pass. Coryell was able to lure Shaw away from USC, where McKay had used him as a tight end. The Aztecs finished 9–0–1 in 1968. They declined to accept any bowl invitations, and had withdrawn from the CCAA in advance of joining the new Pacific Coast Athletic Association (PCAA) the following season, but were voted the No. 1 small college team in the UPI poll and No. 2 by the AP. In 1969, the team played in the top-tier University Division for the first time and faced higher-rated teams than in previous years. Nonetheless, the Aztecs posted their second 11–0 record of Coryell's tenure, scoring over 40 points in seven of their games and only once winning by fewer than 10 points. They became the first PCAA champions with a 6–0 conference record, ranked No. 18 in the UPI poll, and defeated Boston University 28–7 in the Pasadena Bowl. Coryell continued to build a reputation as a top passing coach; Shaw was the nation's top passer with over 3,000 yards, and set NCAA records for touchdown passes in a game (9) and in a season (39). As a team, the Aztecs ranked first in the nation in passing yards, total yards and points scored. Coryell said of his offensive philosophy, "The quickest way to move the football is with the pass. That's the shortest route to the end zone."

Coryell interviewed for Wisconsin's vacant head coach after the 1969 season, but ultimately stayed in San Diego for another three seasons. With future NFL MVP Brian Sipe the quarterback the Aztecs went 9–2 in 1970, winning their first nine games before losing to Long Beach State, who shared the PCAA title with them. The loss broke a 31-game unbeaten streak and ended a 55–1–1 run that had begun in 1965. The 1971 season was Coryell's worst with San Diego State, as they finished with a 6–5 record; it was the only time one of his Aztec teams lost more than two games in a season. Coryell was hampered by a new rule imposed by the university's Student Council removing preregistration privileges from athletes, meaning that they could not be sure of being on the courses they desired. This made recruitment much harder for Coryell, who needed to replace half his team every season due to his reliance on bringing in juniors with only two years of eligibility. He later said, "I couldn't tolerate having my future riding on the whims of others. That's when I started seriously thinking of finding a new job." After interviewing for a vacancy with the Denver Broncos but failing to win the job, Coryell stayed for one further year in San Diego. The Aztecs rebounded to finish 10–1, winning the PCAA with a 4–0 conference record.

Over twelve seasons with the Aztecs, Coryell compiled a record of 104–19–2; combined with his time at Whittier, this gave him an overall college record of 126–24–3. His Aztec teams won four CCAA titles (including one shared), three PCAA titles (one shared), were voted the No. 1 small college three times by the UPI and twice by the AP, and won in each of their three bowl appearances. On his decision to leave San Diego for the NFL's St. Louis Cardinals he said, "I've gone as far as I can in the situation I'm in ... I was blessed as a college coach, yet there comes a time when you want more.

== St. Louis Cardinals (1973–1977) ==
=== 1973 season ===
Coryell's first NFL job was with the St. Louis Cardinals; the Cardinals had a vacancy after dismissing Bob Hollway, whose two seasons in charge had produced a pair of 4–9–1 records. After his off-field difficulties during the 1971 season Coryell had committed to finding a job in the professional ranks, where he would be able to focus purely on coaching and not on recruitment. He contacted the Cardinals about the vacancy and was named their head coach on January 18, 1973, signing a three-year contract. Team owner Bill Bidwill introduced Coryell as a coach who could improve the offense, ranked last in the National Football Conference the previous season. Coryell expressed an intention to favor the pass, saying, "I believe in the passing game... I've gradually come about to a wide-open style of ball," and explaining that a weaker team's best chance of beating a stronger one lay with the pass. He brought in several of his former San Diego State assistant coaches, including Gibbs, Dowhower and Jim Hanifan. When training camp began, several players praised the atmosphere created by their new head coach's enthusiasm, positive attitude and willingness to offer praise.

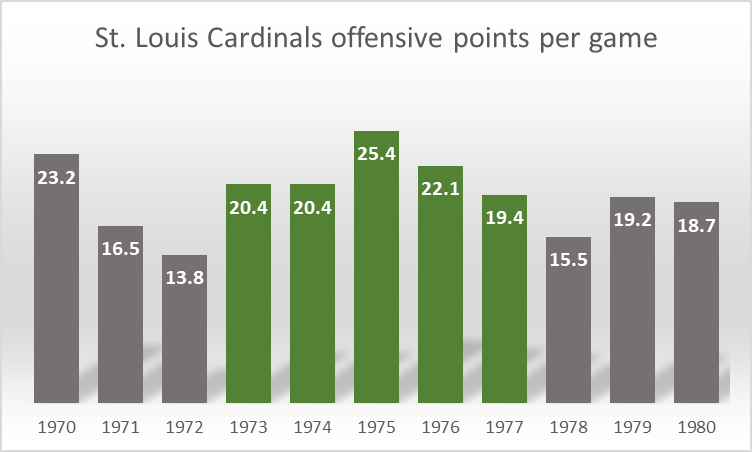
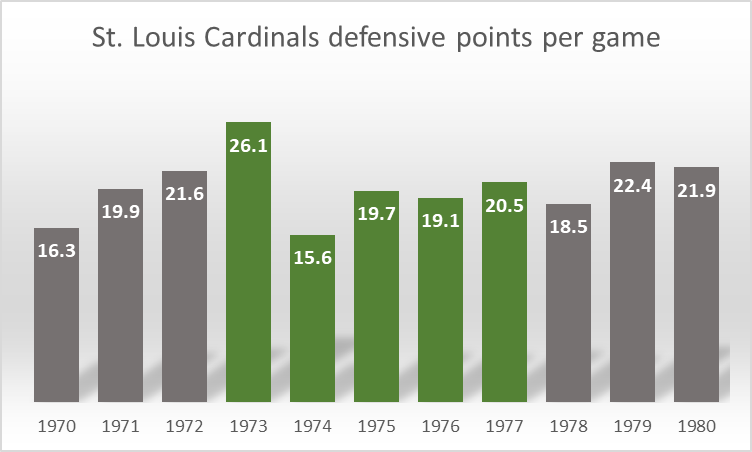
The Cardinals' points scored and conceded per game from three years before Coryell's arrival in St. Louis to three years after his departure. Seasons where Coryell was the head coach are highlighted in green.

The Cardinals showed no immediate improvement in results, as their 1973 season produced a third consecutive 4–9–1 record. They began well, taking a 21–0 lead less than seven minutes into their opening-day win in Philadelphia and following up by beating the defending NFC East champions Washington in Coryell's regular-season home debut, but won only twice more through the rest of the season. The team's passing attack did improve. Jim Hart, who Coryell had committed to as starting quarterback during training camp, set new personal bests by completing 55.6% of his passes (the second-best percentage in franchise history at the time), and being intercepted on only 3.1% of his attempts, second only to Fran Tarkenton in 1973. Despite the losing record, Bidwill expressed satisfaction with the improved morale of the team and gave Coryell a new contract on December 27, extended by two years through to the end of the 1977 season.

=== 1974 season ===
St. Louis began their 1974 season with little expectation of a playoff run; Coryell expressed concern after a series of weak preseason performances. The team improved greatly once the regular season began, winning their first seven games en route to an eventual 10–4 record and their first divisional title since 1948, when they were based in Chicago. Impressed by his rushing attack's performance in a victory over Atlanta late in the previous season, Coryell opted to shift away from his pass-heavy offensive philosophy, adopting a more run-based style that would control the ball for longer and reduce pressure on the defense. The new approach yielded Pro Bowl appearances for five players, including four on offense. Running back Terry Metcalf doubled as a kick returner and became the first Cardinal to gain over 2,000 all-purpose yards in a season, while Hart won the UPI NFC player of the year award, leading the conference with 20 touchdowns while throwing only 8 interceptions from 388 attempts. The St. Louis defense won a pair of early-season games with late stops, and conceded their fewest points since the franchise moved to St. Louis with 218; Coryell considered them his most improved unit.

St Louis travelled to Minnesota for the divisional playoffs, where they were tied 7–7 at halftime but eventually defeated 30–14 by the Vikings. Coryell said of the defeat, "We had a satisfying, wonderful season. It was great to get here. But it's still a disappointing end." Despite the defeat, Coryell was named the Associated Press Coach of the Year, receiving 50 of the 78 available votes. He had his contract extended again before the following season, running for six more years through to 1980.

=== 1975 season ===
St. Louis repeated as NFC East champions in 1975, finishing 11–3; they were two games behind Dallas and one behind Washington after losing to both those teams in the first four weeks of the season, but defeated both their rivals while winning nine of their final ten games to top the division; The team were dubbed the 'Cardiac Cards' after winning a series of close games during their run-in. While Coryell's defense was worse than the previous season, ranking only 10th of 13 NFC teams, his offense continued to improve; they also continued to increase their percentage of rushing plays, 555 runs to 355 passes. Coryell said of the shift, "My philosophy is exactly the same. If we're capable of running against a good team now, we will... we've matured in a lot of ways, and now we can run the ball." Metcalf set an NFL record with 2,462 all-purpose yards and the Cardinals had the NFC leaders for both rushing and receiving yards (Jim Otis and Mel Gray). With St. Louis conceding only eight sacks, they had three offensive linemen among their nine Pro Bowlers.

St. Louis were again disappointing in the playoffs, losing in the first round at the Los Angeles Rams. Hart had been more prone to interceptions than the previous year, and he threw two that were returned for touchdowns as the Rams took a 28–6 lead inside twenty minutes, eventually winning 35–23. The Cardinals defense struggled to stop Rams running back Lawrence McCutcheon, who set a playoff record with 203 rushing yards. Coryell commented, "We put our defense in embarrassing positions, but I'm proud our people had the competitiveness to battle back when we were behind". He was again a contender for AP coach of the year, gaining eight votes while Tom Landry of the Cowboys won the award with twelve votes.

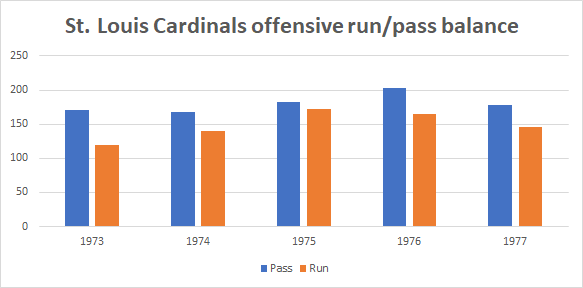
The Cardinals' average passing yards per game (in blue) and average rushing yards per game (in orange), for each season that Coryell was the head coach

=== 1976 season ===
Despite a third consecutive season with double-digit wins, St Louis missed the playoffs at 10–4. They again played in a number of close games, standing at 8–2 after Jim Bakken kicked late game-winning field goals in three consecutive weeks, the third of which was a playoff rematch at the Los Angeles Rams. This left them one game behind Dallas and two ahead of Washington, but they lost to both their rivals in the space of four days, both times turning the ball over on downs in opposition territory in the final seconds. In the latter of the two losses, 19–14 in Dallas, there were controversial non-calls of pass interference against the Cowboys as St. Louis looked for the winning touchdown; Coryell claimed, "The game was taken away from us." Despite winning their final two games, St. Louis lost the NFC's lone wildcard berth to Washington on tiebreakers. They had struggled with injuries during the season, as well as frequent fumbles on offense, but set franchise season records for total yardage and first downs, and were again well-represented in the Pro Bowl, with six nominees including four offensive starters.

=== 1977 season ===
The Cardinals finished 7–7 and missed the playoffs again in Coryell's final season. They were again in contention after ten games having won six consecutive games to stand in the NFC wild card spot at 7–3, but collapsed to lose four, beginning with an embarrassing 55–14 loss to the Miami Dolphins on national television. While the offense remained strong, the defense lacked the depth to overcome a number of injuries, and became one of the league's weaker units.

"This place is tearing my life apart... A lot of our guys are playing out their options and they would scatter if they could. The coaches are all that's holding this team together."

— Coryell, in a conversation with Jack Murphy he believed to be off the record.

St. Louis were eliminated from playoff contention following their penultimate game, a 26–20 home defeat by Washington. Coryell showed anger at the Cardinals fans and organization after the game, saying that the fans had verbally abused both himself and his family, that he had lower wages and fewer assistant coaches than his rivals, and that he should have more of a say over which new players were drafted. Following a meeting with Bidwill on December 12, the owner said that he expected Coryell to return as head coach the following season, though Coryell stated he was still disappointed and upset. The following day, what he had believed to be an off the record conversation with Jack Murphy was published in the San Diego Union. The piece contained more Coryell quotes critical of the Cardinals organization, bemoaning a lack of spending, the quality of his defensive players, and a restrictive contract that forbade Coryell from having any business interests without Bidwill's permission, as well as predicting that the Cardinals would keep getting worse over the next two seasons, and stating that he would only stay in St. Louis if his salary was increased by enough for his family to live in San Diego. Coryell didn't deny the veracity of the quotes, describing them as a 'terrible mistake' and stating that he and Bidwill had made progress over his contract concerns during their meeting, as well as discussing plans to increase the role of Coryell and his staff in the drafting process.

Uncertainty as to Coryell's future followed his remarks, and continued after a season-ending loss to the Tampa Bay Buccaneers. His family's preference for living in San Diego prompted media speculation that he would take the San Diego Chargers head coaching job but the incumbent, Tommy Prothro, was given an extension for the 1978 season. On December 22, Coryell accepted an invitation for himself and his staff to coach in the Senior Bowl, having consulted with Bidwill; Coryell led the North team to a 17–14 victory on January 7. Following a 25-minute conversation on January 9, Bidwill released a statement that his Director of Operations would handle any further meetings with Coryell. During the meeting, Bidwill had given his head coach permission to talk to other teams, and Coryell flew to Los Angeles to talk with the Rams the following day. The Rams job went instead to George Allen, in part because Bidwill was asking Los Angeles for a 1st-round draft pick to release Coryell from the remainder of his contract; Coryell also missed out on a vacancy with the New Orleans Saints, despite the price being reduced to a 2nd-round pick.

On February 10, 1978, Bidwill officially announced that Coryell had been dismissed as head coach of the Cardinals, explaining "I just don't think it's in the best interest of the football team for a coach to say that he's unhappy and that he wants another job." By the terms of their agreement, Coryell would still only be able to coach in the NFL in 1978 with Bidwill's permission.

Coryell compiled a record of 42–27–1 during his five years in St. Louis, setting a franchise record for wins by a head coach; (Note: Ken Whisenhunt broke this record in 2012.) his postseason record was 0–2. The two NFC East titles he won with the Cardinals were their only divisional crowns in the city of St. Louis, (Note: The Cardinals played in St. Louis from 1960–87.) the previous having come in 1948 (as the Chicago Cardinals) and the next arriving in 2008 (as the Arizona Cardinals). A Sports Illustrated article published in 2020 named Coryell as the best head coach in franchise history. He is credited with improving offensive stars such as Hart, Gray, and Hall of Fame offensive lineman Dan Dierdorf.

== San Diego Chargers (1978–1986) ==
=== 1978 season ===
Coryell moved back to San Diego in April 1978, having apparently missed out on any head coaching posts for the coming season. He coached a San Diego State alumni team in a match against their current varsity, losing 37–14, and attended a preseason scrimmage between the Chargers and Cowboys. With Tommy Prothro's contract set to expire in one more year, Coryell was rumored to be a likely replacement in 1979. In the event, he missed only four regular season games before he was back to work.

The Chargers, after struggling for most of the 1970s, had entered their 1978 season with hopes of a playoff push; the previous year they had gone 7–7 despite their offense being hampered by a ten-game holdout from starting quarterback Dan Fouts. They opened with a 1–3 record under Prothro, winning their opener before losing three straight, culminating in a 24–3 defeat to the Green Bay Packers in which they committed eleven turnovers. Believing that the team needed "a rude awakening", Prothro chose to resign. The transition happened quickly on the morning of September 25; Chargers owner Gene Klein accepted Prothro's resignation at 5 a.m. and telephoned Coryell at 6 a.m. to offer him the job, which Coryell enthusiastically accepted. By 10 a.m., Klein had negotiated Coryell's release from the Cardinals in exchange for a 3rd-round draft pick in 1980. Coryell described the appointment as "like a dream come true" at his introductory press conference, also stating that he would retain Prothro's staff and noting that his predecessor's offensive system was similar to Coryell's own. The Los Angeles Times described the appointment as "a merger made in Heaven", with Coryell's expertise expected to improve the offense to match the already-strong defense.

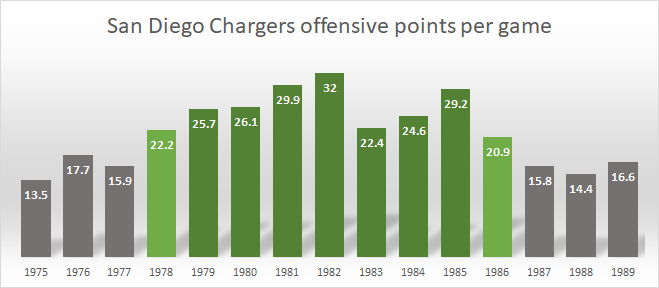
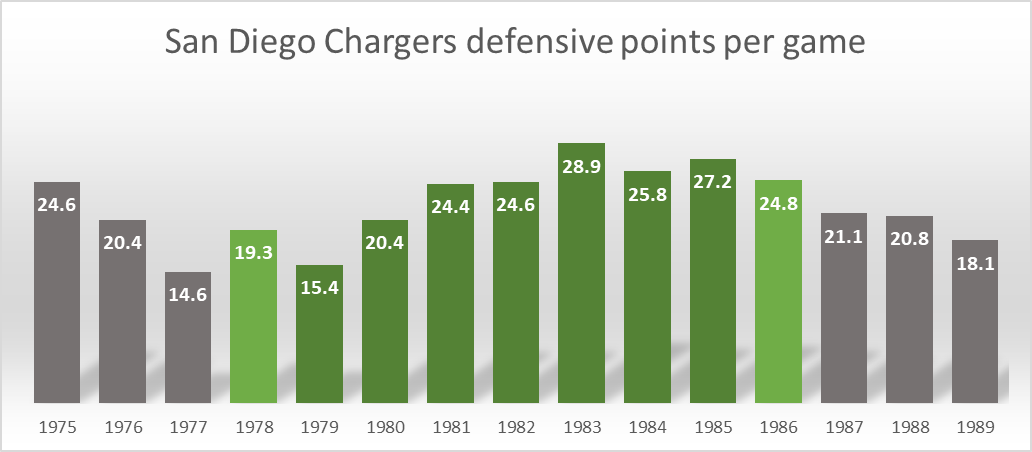
Charts showing the Chargers' points scored and conceded per game, from three years before Coryell's arrival in San Diego to three years after his departure. Seasons where Coryell was the head coach are highlighted in green (light green when he coached for part of a season).

Coryell lost his first game in charge at New England, then won on his return to San Diego Stadium (still shared by the Chargers and Aztecs); a crowd of 50,000 gave him an ovation at both the start and finish of a 23–0 victory over the Denver Broncos. San Diego lost their next two games, and were 2–6 heading into a game at the Oakland Raiders, coached by Coryell's former protégé John Madden. The Chargers won that game, (Note: The 27–23 victory was the Chargers' first in Oakland for ten years.) beginning a run of seven wins in eight weeks to finish with a 9–7 record. While they missed the playoffs by one game, it was their first winning season since 1969.

After playing conservatively for much of the season, Coryell's offense put up 985 passing yards while scoring a combined 122 points over the final three games. Fouts finished with a career-high 2,999 yards, tying a franchise record with 369 in the finale, while wide receiver John Jefferson, the Chargers' top pick in the 1978 draft, had 1,001 yards receiving and tied a rookie record with 13 touchdowns. As a team, the Chargers led the league with 3,375 passing yards.

=== 1979 season ===
Coryell added Hanifan and Gibbs to his staff for the third time early in the offseason, soon promoting Gibbs to offensive coordinator. (Note: Gibbs replaced Ray Perkins, who left to coach the New York Giants.) He was more involved in the draft process than he had been in St. Louis, and instrumental in the Chargers trading up to pick tight end Kellen Winslow in the first round. San Diego entered 1979 with high expectations after their strong finish the previous year, though Coryell played down their Super Bowl chances, noting that they had yet to win even a divisional title since joining the NFL.

In the event, the Chargers did capture their first AFC West title, posting a 12–4 record and clinching the division by beating Denver 17–7 in the final game of the regular season. Nicknamed Air Coryell, their passing attack was the focus of the offense throughout the year, as they called more passing plays (541) than rushing (481), unusual for a successful team at the time. Fouts broke Joe Namath's single-season passing record with 4,082 yards, and both Jefferson and eleventh-year veteran Charlie Joiner went over 1,000 yards receiving. Speaking of the success of the passing game, Fouts said, "Ninety percent of it is coaching... wanting to pass, teaching it properly, working on it by the hour." The defense was also strong, claiming four interceptions of Denver quarterback Craig Morton in the finale and five of Terry Bradshaw in an earlier win over the defending Super Bowl champion Pittsburgh Steelers. Coryell received 10 votes for AP Coach of the Year, finishing in third place. (Note: Washington head coach Jack Pardee won the award with 30 votes.)

"We weren't beaten by signals. We were beaten by the Oilers. We were beaten by a stubborn fine defense, and our mistakes. We're making no excuses about signals."

— Coryell, reacting to reports that Houston had decoded his offensive signals in the Chargers' divisional playoff defeat.

San Diego entered the 1979–80 NFL playoffs having earned home field advantage as the No. 1 seed in the AFC, and were favored by 8 points in their opening game against the Houston Oilers. Despite being without starting quarterback Dan Pastorini and NFL rushing champion Earl Campbell, the Oilers won 17–14; Fouts threw five interceptions, two of which led to Houston touchdowns. It emerged after the game that Houston defensive coordinator Ed Biles had broken the code the Chargers used to hand-signal in their offensive plays, giving his defense advanced knowledge of what was to come. Coryell was skeptical as to the truth of the story, and whether any signal-stealing would have a major impact on the game, believing that Oilers would have needed a high degree of experience with the Chargers' system to take advantage of the information. He defended the use of hand signals as opposed to having a runner relay the play calls to Fouts, as the former system was quicker and less prone to error.

=== 1980 season ===
Coryell's Chargers repeated as division champions with an 11–5 record in 1980; they stood at 6–4 following a mid-season loss to Denver, but ran off five victories in their final six games and beat Oakland to the title on tiebreakers. While the Chargers improved their running game with the midseason acquisition of Chuck Muncie, it was their passing attack that continued to dominate, described by The New York Times as having "more in common with fast-break basketball offense than with traditional ball-control football." Winslow, who had missed most of his rookie season with a broken leg, was available for all of 1980. Coryell had him line up as both a tight end and wide receiver, and he led the league in receptions with 89. With Winslow, Coryell redefined the tight end position into a deep, pass-catching threat too fast for a linebacker and too big for a defensive back, reasoning that "If we're asking Kellen to block a defensive end and not catch passes, I'm not a very good coach." Winslow also joined Jefferson and Joiner in gaining over 1,000 receiving yards—the first trio of teammates to achieve that feat in the same season. Fouts improved on his own passing yardage record with 4,715, while breaking three other single-season records (attempts, completions and 300-yard games), and the Chargers as a team broke the records for most first downs and yards in a season. On defense, the pass rush provided by defensive linemen Fred Dean, Louie Kelcher, Gary "Big Hands" Johnson and Leroy Jones was a strength. San Diego had the league leader in sacks (Johnson with 17 1/2) and also ranked top as a team, with 60. (Note: While the NFL did not keep sack statistics until 1982, they were unofficially reported in 1980.)

Again the No. 1 seed in the AFC playoffs, San Diego opened with a home divisional playoff game against the Buffalo Bills, who possessed the league's top-ranked defense and had beaten the Chargers earlier in the season. Buffalo led 14–3 at halftime before the Chargers came back to win 20–14, the winning touchdown being scored by backup wide receiver Ron Smith with barely two minutes to play. San Diego won despite having to change their offensive formation when blocking tight end Gregg McCrary was injured early in the game. "It took a lot of our offense away from us," said Coryell, who won his first playoff game at the fourth attempt. McCrary would also miss the AFC championship game against Oakland, forcing Winslow to do more blocking and less receiving. Despite again having homefield advantage, San Diego committed three early turnovers and fell behind 28–7 to the Raiders, eventually losing 34–27. Coryell said, "We didn't play well enough to win... Actually, I was very proud of our comeback in the second half—but it wasn't quite enough."

=== 1981 season ===
Early in the 1981 season, Coryell lost high-profile players on both offense and defense, with Jefferson and Dean both holding out. Klein, who had a personal rule against renegotiating a contract, opted to trade both players. (Note: Jefferson was traded to the Packers for one 1st-round pick, two 2nd-round picks, two opportunities to swap 1st-round picks, and wide receiver Aundra Thompson; Dean went to the San Francisco 49ers in exchange for a 2nd-round pick and one chance to swap 1st-round picks.) Coryell was not involved in either decision, but did not publicly criticize them. He said of Jefferson, "My job is to coach the football players on the field and that's what I'm going to do—I want to coach the people who want to play," and of Dean, "We regret it, but this was his choice."

Despite the high-profile departures, and despite an indifferent 6–5 start to the season, San Diego eventually finished 10–6 and won their third consecutive AFC West crown, edging out Denver on tiebreakers. Deprived of Dean's pass-rushing ability and hampered by injuries, the Charger defense declined sharply, rated second worst in the league for total yardage; their pass defense was particularly weak, as they gave up an NFL-record 4,311 yards. By contrast, and despite Gibbs leaving the coordinator role, Coryell's offense continued to break records. (Note: Gibbs left to take the available head coach job at Washington.) They spent some of their capital from the Jefferson trade bringing in his replacement, Wes Chandler, (Note: San Diego acquired Chandler from the Saints in exchange for 1st- and 3rd-round draft picks and Thompson.) who joined Winslow and Joiner in gaining over 1,000 receiving yards. As a team, the Chargers broke their own records for total yardage and led the league in scoring. Individually, Fouts again broke the NFL passing yardage record with 4,802 and Muncie tied another record with 19 rushing touchdowns while gaining over 1,000 yards; both benefitted from an experienced offensive line who allowed only 19 sacks from 648 pass plays. After clinching the division Coryell pronounced himself satisfied to have come through the off-field distractions, blaming the press for stories of discontent within his squad and for criticisms of the defense.

"I have coached for 31 or 32 years and there has never been a game like this. It was probably the most exciting game in pro football history."

— Coryell, reflecting on the Epic in Miami.

San Diego entered the postseason with a trip to Miami to face the AFC East champion Dolphins. Aware that the game would be played in taxing, humid conditions, Coryell decided on the flight over that his players should eat bananas beforehand, reasoning that they contained potassium and would reduce the risk of cramp. In what came to be known as the Epic in Miami; San Diego led 24–0, trailed 38–31 and won 41–38 after nearly fourteen minutes of overtime, having blocked two potential game-winning field goals by the Dolphins. In keeping with their regular season, San Diego set several offensive records for a playoff game, including most pass attempts, completions and yards for Fouts and most receptions for Winslow; with the Charger defense struggling to stop Miami, the game also set playoff records for combined points and yardage. San Diego advanced to the AFC championship game, where they would meet the Cincinnati Bengals in what were expected to be freezing conditions; Coryell was concerned that the cold would make the ball heavier and harder, affecting the Chargers' passing attack. Swirling winds on game day made for even colder conditions than expected and added to the difficulty in passing; San Diego lost the game, which would become known as the Freezer Bowl, by a score of 27–7. In the aftermath of the game, Coryell proposed that playoff games should all be played at neutral, warm-weather sites.

=== 1982 season ===
San Diego made numerous changes to try and improve their defense during the offseason. They impressed in the first two weeks, forcing six turnovers in a 23–3 win at Denver. After one more game, an NFL players strike interrupted the season. With no games to coach, Coryell attended some college football and scouted future prospects. He expressed his frustration as the strike continued, as well as his fears that the whole season would be cancelled, wasting a year of his career. The strike ended after 57 days, resulting in a reduced regular season of nine games. San Diego finished with a 6–3 record, earning the No. 5 seed in an expanded eight-team AFC playoff bracket. They reverted to their form of the previous season after the resumption, both scoring and conceding points at a rapid pace. In back-to-back weeks they beat the San Francisco 49ers and the Bengals by scores of 41–37 and 50–34, with the latter game featuring an NFL-record 883 passing yards. The Chargers led the league in points, total yardage and passing yardage, while their defense was the third-worst in the AFC; explaining the lopsided nature of his team, Coryell blamed the lack of time his rebuilt defense had spent playing together.

San Diego began the playoff tournament with a trip to Pittsburgh. Their ability to perform in a cold-weather city was questioned after the previous season's Freezer Bowl defeat, but they came from eleven points behind in the final quarter to beat the Steelers 31–28. The following week, they travelled to face the Dolphins in a rematch of the Epic in Miami. The game proved anticlimactic as Miami's top-ranked defense shut down the Charger offense in an easy 34–13 win, with San Diego committing seven turnovers; Coryell said afterwards, "We would have had to play our best game against Miami to have a chance to beat them. We didn't do it." It would be the last time he coached in the playoffs.

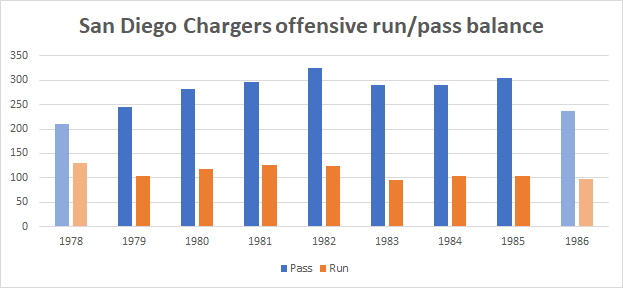
The Chargers' average passing yards per game (in blue) and average rushing yards per game (in orange), for each season that Coryell was the head coach

=== 1983 season ===
San Diego finished 6–10 in 1983, their first losing record of the Coryell era. The Chargers continued to lead the league in total yardage and passing yardage, but following a midseason injury to Fouts, they could no longer overcome the frailties of the defense. Coryell described the disappointment of missing the playoffs as less intense than the depression of losing in them. After the season, he accepted an invitation to coach in the Senior Bowl for the second time, leading the South to a 21–20 victory.

=== 1984 season ===
Coryell's employer changed shortly before the season when Klein sold the Chargers to builder Alex Spanos, previously a minority owner. San Diego began the season 4–2 and in the thick of the AFC West race, but won only three more games and finished last in the division with a 7–9 record. Coryell made over forty roster changes during the season, mostly due to injuries, and several starters missed time; Winslow missed eight games with a shattered knee and Fouts three games with a groin injury, while Muncie was suspended for violating the league's drug policy. The defense was again a weakness and the pass offense again a strength, though for the first time in Coryell's tenure they did not lead the league in passing yardage, instead ranking second behind Miami. (Note: The Dolphins broke San Diego's team record set in 1981, while their quarterback Dan Marino broke Fouts' individual record from the same season.) Spanos gave Coryell a public vote of confidence towards the end of the season.

=== 1985 season ===
On July 9, 1985, the Chargers waived seven veteran players; Coryell stated that the move would allow younger players to gain more experience. Later that month he denied rumors that the players had been cut without his knowledge; he agreed that he had not been part of the decision, but publicly claimed to agree with it. One of the released players, Ray Preston, claimed in a 2006 interview that a tearful Coryell had telephoned to tell Preston of his release and assure him that Coryell would have retained him given the choice. Spanos invested heavily in new players during the offseason and suggested that Coryell needed to produce at least an 8–8 record to keep his job.

Coryell's Chargers met Spanos' requirement with an 8–8 record in 1985. The offense bounced back to reclaim their league-leading status, despite Fouts again missing time through injury. Coryell had a new weapon in 5 foot 6 inch Lionel James, whose 2,535 all-purpose yards broke the NFL record Metcalf had set for Coryell in 1975. He also set a new record for receiving yards by a running back with 1,027 as the Chargers topped the league in passing for the seventh time in eight years. With the defense again among the league's worst, San Diego won games by scores of 44–41, 40–34 and 54–44.

"I want to go out on top as a real winner. I want to be part of this team when it wins. I don't want to wait. I want to win now."

— Coryell, after signing a one-year contract extension. He would be dismissed after only eight more games.

The day after the season finished, Spanos pronounced himself satisfied that his goal of an 8–8 record had been met and extended Coryell's contract by a year to run through 1987 (though the new contract had no guaranteed money past 1986). Spanos also promoted receivers coach Al Saunders to assistant head coach, where he would act as a liaison for Spanos and a potential heir to the head coach role. Coryell welcomed the moves, stating that Saunders' promotion would give him more time to work with the defense.

=== 1986 season ===
Coryell had a strained relationship with Spanos, who began meeting with Saunders to discuss the future of the team, reducing Coryell's authority. The Chargers cut starting linebacker Linden King on July 25, only two days after Coryell had praised his progress in a new inside linebacker role. King defended Coryell and blamed scouting director Ron Nay (an adviser to Spanos) for his release.

San Diego began their 1986 season with an impressive 50–28 win over Miami, but it was to be the last victory of Coryell's 37-year coaching career. The Chargers lost their next seven consecutive games, and Spanos dismissed his head coach on October 29, 1986, after over nine years in the job, replacing him with Saunders. While Coryell agreed to put his name to a statement saying that he had resigned, and Spanos denied having influenced him, this version of events was met with some scepticism by Coryell's former players; King declared that Spanos was looking for scapegoats to blame for the team's struggles. Coryell remained silent on the matter for several years, but stated in a 1992 interview that his exit had been Spanos' decision. Spanos confirmed this in his 2002 autobiography; he also said that he regretted not dismissing Coryell and the rest of Klein's personnel as soon as he took over control of the team, noting that Jerry Jones had "cleaned house" when he bought the Dallas Cowboys in 1989 with good results.

Coryell never returned to coaching after leaving the Chargers, turning down a number of subsequent offers. His regular season record with the Chargers was 69–56, giving him an overall NFL record of 111–83–1; in the postseason, his record was 3–4 with the Chargers and 3–6 overall. The San Diego Union Tribune named him the second-best head coach in Charger history in a 2012 article. (Note: Sid Gillman was ranked above him.) The Chargers inducted him into their Hall of Fame in 1994.

== Legacy ==
Coryell was the first head coach to win 100 games at both the collegiate and professional levels. He earned a reputation for quickly turning around a losing team, doing so with numerous college programs before taking both the Cardinals and Chargers into the playoffs in his second seasons with the franchises. Coryell is remembered primarily as an offensive coach who could tailor his offense to suit the skills of the personnel available. More specifically, he is associated with innovations in the passing game; the Air Coryell offense he developed with the Chargers was called "one of the most explosive and exciting offenses that ever set foot on an NFL field" by the Pro Football Hall of Fame. Three principle players from that offense (Fouts, Winslow and Joiner) would go on to be inducted into the Hall of Fame, as would Coryell himself.

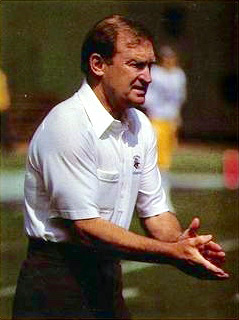
Coryell coaching the Chargers, c. 1981.

San Diego's offense was statistically dominant during Coryell's tenure. They led the league in passing yards an NFL-record six consecutive years from 1978 to 1983 and again in 1985; they also led the league in total yards and first downs in 1980–1983 and 1985, and in scoring in 1981, 1982 and 1985. During his career, Coryell advocated for the league to adopt rules changes that would assist offenses; as well as wanting playoff games to be played in neutral, warm-weather cities, Coryell suggested widening the field and allowing multiple men in motion, as in the CFL. Air Coryell remained influential in the league after Coryell's retirement, with Washington, Dallas and the St. Louis Rams all winning Super Bowls while using versions of the offense.

Detractors of Coryell point to the Chargers' defensive shortcomings, given that his defenses were in the bottom five league-wide in points allowed from 1981 to 1986. Tom Bass, who was a defensive coordinator for Coryell with both SDSU and the Chargers, said Coryell focused on offense during practice. He left the coaching of defensive players and the defensive game plan to Bass. "In planning and designing defense, he simply had no interest", said Bass. However, in 1979, the Chargers allowed the fewest points (246) in the AFC, while their defense led the NFL with 60 sacks in 1980. They declined quickly after the trade of Dean in 1981, becoming a frequent liability for the next five seasons. Meanwhile, Dean would go on in the same year to win UPI NFC Defensive Player of the Year (while playing in only 11 games) and help lead the San Francisco 49ers to a Super Bowl both that year and again in 1984. Dean was inducted to the Pro Football Hall of Fame in 2008. The San Diego Union-Tribune in 2013 called the trade "perhaps the biggest blunder in [Chargers] franchise history."

As a character, Coryell was known as a scowling, intense presence on gamedays. His focus on football would often lead him to walk straight by friends or players without noticing them or responding when they greeted him; he worked late hours, and would sleep at his team's training facility two or three times a week while the season was ongoing. Coryell's team talks on the eve of a game were described as highly motivational despite being difficult to follow. Klein said, "Players loved playing for him. He was so sincere that even if the things he said sometimes made no sense, they didn't care." His relaxed approach to discipline and willingness to forge personal connections made him popular with his players. "The most important thing to me about Don Coryell is him as a person. He actually cared about us as players. A lot of coaches don't even know who you are", said Fouts. Coryell did not want to intimidate his players and instead treated his players with respect, allowing them to showcase their strengths. "I don't think a coach has to be a son of a bitch to be successful. I think you can treat men like men", he said.

== Hall of Fame induction ==
After his retirement, Coryell was inducted into the halls of fame of the city of San Diego, San Diego State, the San Diego Chargers, college football, and the University of Washington. In 1993, the Chargers inducted Fouts and Joiner but not Coryell; this embarrassed Fouts, who publicly stated that the coach should have gone in before any of his players. Coryell was inducted the following year.

Coryell took far longer to reach the Pro Football Hall of Fame, his election coming in 2023 after he had first become eligible in 1992. (Note: Coaches and players become eligible once they have been retired for five years.) Possible reasons for the long delay include Coryell's failure to lead his teams to a Super Bowl, a 3–6 postseason record and his perceived weakness in the defensive side of the game. Sports Illustrated writer Jim Trotter, a voter on the Pro Football Hall of Fame Board of Selectors, said selectors were hesitant to vote for coaches while there was a backlog of deserving players. Shortly before his death in 2010, he was among the 15 finalists considered by the Pro Football Hall of Fame selection committee on the Saturday before the Super Bowl. He was not selected that year, and was also a losing finalist in 2015, 2016, 2017, 2019 and 2020.

Advocates for Coryell's inclusion included Madden and Gibbs, both Hall of Fame inductees and former members of his San Diego State staff, and his former players Fouts and Winslow. Fouts said, "He influenced offensive and defensive football because if you are going to have three or four receivers out there, you better have an answer for it on the other side of the ball. If it wasn't for Don, I wouldn't be in the Hall of Fame." Winslow noted that Coryell's influence on the game, with his basic offensive scheme still in use years later: "It's just a personnel change, but it's the same thing. When the Rams won their Super Bowl, it was the same offense, same terminology. For Don Coryell to not be in the Hall of Fame is a lack of knowledge of the voters. That's the nicest way that I can put that. A lack of understanding of the legacy of the game."

The selection committee chose him as the finalist out of a group of 12 coaches and contributors for induction in the class of 2023. In February 2023 he was elected to the Pro Football Hall of Fame; his formal induction took place on August 5, with Fouts presenting Coryell at the ceremony while his daughter Mindy accepted the honor on his behalf.

== Personal life ==
Coryell met his future wife Aliisa during his year coaching Fort Ord; she worked as a recreation director at the facility. The couple had a son and a daughter, Mike and Mindy. After leaving the Chargers, Coryell and his wife spent time backpacking and fishing while not at their home on the island of Friday Harbor in the State of Washington. Often living without a telephone or television, Coryell did not follow football closely during his retirement.

== Death ==
Coryell died on July 1, 2010, at Sharp Grossmont Hospital in La Mesa, California. The cause of death was not officially released, but Coryell had been in poor health for some time.

== Head coaching record ==
=== American college ===
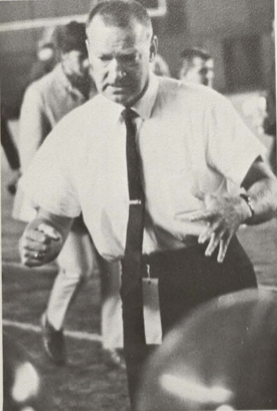
Coryell had a 104–19–2 record with San Diego State.

Year	Team	Overall	Conference	Standing	Bowl/playoffs	Coaches^{#}	AP^{°}
Whittier Poets (Southern California Intercollegiate Athletic Conference) (1957–1959)
1957	Whittier	6–2–1	3–0–1	1st			
1958	Whittier	8–1	4–0	1st			
1959	Whittier	8–2	5–0	1st			
Whittier:		22–5–1	12–0–1				
San Diego State Aztecs (California Collegiate Athletic Association) (1961–1967)
1961	San Diego State	7–2–1	2–2–1	T–3rd			
1962	San Diego State	8–2	5–0	1st			
1963	San Diego State	7–2	3–1	2nd			
1964	San Diego State	8–2	4–1	2nd			
1965	San Diego State	8–2	3–2	3rd			
1966	San Diego State	11–0	5–0	1st	W Camellia	1	1
1967	San Diego State	10–1	5–0	1st	W Camellia	1	1
San Diego State Aztecs (NCAA College Division independent) (1968)
1968	San Diego State	9–0–1				1	2
San Diego State Aztecs (Pacific Coast Athletic Association) (1969–1972)
1969	San Diego State	11–0	6–0	1st	W Pasadena	18	
1970	San Diego State	9–2	5–1	T–1st			
1971	San Diego State	6–5	2–3	T–4th			
1972	San Diego State	10–1	4–0	1st		20	
San Diego State:		104–19–2	44–10–1				
Total:		126–24–3					
National championship Conference title Conference division title or championship game berth

=== American junior college ===
Year	Team	Overall	Conference	Standing	Bowl/playoffs
Wenatchee Valley Knights (Washington Junior College Conference) (1955)
1955	Wenatchee Valley	7–1–1	5–0–1	1st	L Potato Bowl
Wenatchee Valley:		7–1–1	5–0–1		
Total:		7–1–1			
National championship Conference title Conference division title or championship game berth

=== Canadian college ===
Year	Team	Overall	Conference	Standing	Bowl/playoffs
UBC Thunderbirds (Western Canadian Intercollegiate Athletic Association) (1953–1954)
1953	UBC	2–7			
1954	UBC	0–9			
UBC:		2–16			
Total:		2–16			
National championship Conference title Conference division title or championship game berth

=== Professional ===
Team	Year	Regular season					Postseason			
Team	Year	Won	Lost	Ties	Win %	Finish	Won	Lost	Win %	Result
STL	1973	4	9	1	.308	4th in NFC East	–	–	–	–
STL	1974	10	4	0	.714	1st in NFC East	0	1	.000	Lost to Minnesota Vikings in divisional playoffs
STL	1975	11	3	0	.786	1st in NFC East	0	1	.000	Lost to Los Angeles Rams in divisional playoffs
STL	1976	10	4	0	.714	2nd in NFC East	–	–	–	–
STL	1977	7	7	0	.500	3rd in NFC East	–	–	–	–
STL Total		42	27	1	.607		0	2	.000	–
SD	1978	8	4	0	.667	3rd in AFC West	–	–	–	–
SD	1979	12	4	0	.750	1st in AFC West	0	1	.000	Lost to Houston Oilers in divisional playoffs
SD	1980	11	5	0	.688	1st in AFC West	1	1	.500	Lost to Oakland Raiders in AFC championship
SD	1981	10	6	0	.625	1st in AFC West	1	1	.500	Lost to Cincinnati Bengals in AFC championship
SD	1982	6	3	0	.667	2nd in AFC West	1	1	.500	Lost to Miami Dolphins in divisional playoffs
SD	1983	6	10	0	.375	4th in AFC West	–	–	–	–
SD	1984	7	9	0	.438	5th in AFC West	–	–	–	–
SD	1985	8	8	0	.500	3rd in AFC West	–	–	–	–
SD	1986	1	7	0	.125	5th in AFC West	–	–	–	–
SD Total		69	56	0	.552		3	4	.429	–
NFL Total		111	83	1	.572		3	6	.333	–

=== Individual honors ===
- AP NFL Coach of the Year, 1974
- UPI NFC Coach of the Year, 1974
- PFWA NFC Coach of the Year, 1974
- PFWA AFC Coach of the Year, 1979
- Breitbard Hall of Fame, class of 1987
- San Diego State Aztecs Hall of Fame, class of 1988
- San Diego Chargers Hall of Fame, class of 1994
- College Football Hall of Fame, class of 1999
- Washington Huskies, class of 2000
- Pro Football Hall of Fame, class of 2023
- San Diego Chargers 40th Anniversary Team
- San Diego Chargers 50th Anniversary Team

=== Titles and championships ===
==== College ====
- 3× SCIAC champion (1957–1959)
- 4× CCAA champion (1962–1963, 1966–1967)
- 3× UPI NCAA College Division champion (1966–1968)
- 3× AP NCAA College Division champion (1966–1967)
- 2x Camellia Bowl winner (1966–1967)
- 3× PCAA champion (1969–1970, 1972)
- Pasadena Bowl winner (1969)

==== NFL ====
- 2x NFC East champion (1974–1975)
- 3x AFC West champion (1979–1981)

=== NFL records ===
The following records, set during Coryell's tenure with the San Diego Chargers, remain in the NFL Record & Fact Book as of 2023.

- Most consecutive seasons leading league, first downs: 4 (1980–1983)
- Most consecutive seasons leading league, net yards gained rushing and passing: 4 (1980–1983) (Note: Tied with Chicago Bears (1941-44).)
- Most consecutive seasons leading league, passing yards: 6 (1978–1983) (Note: Tommy Prothro was the head coach for the first four games in 1978.)
- Most consecutive games, 400+ yards gained rushing and passing: 11 (1982–1983)
- Most touchdown passes, game: 7 (week 12, 1981) (Note: Tied with numerous other teams.)

== Coaching tree ==
Assistant coaches under Coryell who subsequently become college or professional head coaches:

- John Madden: Oakland Raiders (1969–1978)
- Ray Perkins: New York Giants (1979–1982), Alabama (1983–1986), Tampa Bay Buccaneers (1987–1990)
- Joe Gibbs: Washington Redskins (1981–1992), (2004–2007)
- Jim Hanifan: St. Louis Cardinals (1980–1985), Atlanta Falcons (1989)
- Rod Dowhower: Indianapolis Colts (1985–1986)
- Al Saunders: San Diego Chargers (1986–1988)
- Jim L. Mora: Atlanta Falcons (2004–2006), Seattle Seahawks (2009), UCLA (2012–2017), UConn (2022–present)

== See also ==
- List of National Football League head coaches with 50 wins

== Bibliography ==
- Stein, Joe; Clark, Diane (1976). Don Coryell: "Win With Honor". Joyce Press. ISBN 978-0-89325-003-4.
- Jaworski, Ron; Plaut, David; Cosell, Greg (2011). The Games That Changed the Game: The Evolution of the NFL in Seven Sundays. Random House. ISBN 978-0-34551-796-8.
- Klein, Gene; Fisher, David (1987). First Down and a Billion: the Funny Business of Pro Football. Morrow. ISBN 0-688-06894-4.
