= 1966 Fresno State Bulldogs football team =

American college football season

1966 Fresno State Bulldogs football
- Conference: California Collegiate Athletic Association
- Record: 7–3 (3–2 CCAA)
- Head coach: Darryl Rogers (1st season)
- Home stadium: Ratcliffe Stadium

1966 California Collegiate Athletic Association football standings
	Conf.					Overall
Team	W		L		T	W		L		T
No. 1/1 San Diego State $	5	–	0	–	0	11	–	0	–	0
Fresno State	3	–	2	–	0	7	–	3	–	0
Long Beach State	3	–	2	–	0	6	–	3	–	0
Cal Poly	2	–	3	–	0	6	–	4	–	0
Cal State Los Angeles	2	–	3	–	0	4	–	6	–	0
Valley State	0	–	5	–	0	2	–	7	–	1
$ – Conference champion; Rankings from AP/UPI small college polls

The 1966 Fresno State Bulldogs football team represented Fresno State College—now known as California State University, Fresno—as a member of the California Collegiate Athletic Association (CCAA) during the 1966 NCAA College Division football season. Led by first-year head coach Darryl Rogers, Fresno State compiled an overall record of 7–3 with a mark of 3–2 in conference play, tying for second place in the CCAA. The Bulldogs played home games at Ratcliffe Stadium on the campus of Fresno City College in Fresno, California.

== Schedule ==
Date	Opponent	Site	Result	Attendance	Source
September 17	Hawaii*	Ratcliffe Stadium; Fresno, CA (rivalry)	W 28–27	9,089	
September 24	Northern Arizona*	Ratcliffe Stadium; Fresno, CA	W 14–12	8,586–10,500	
October 1	at No. 3 Montana State*	Gatton Field; Bozeman, MT	L 6–55	9,100	
October 8	Valley State	Ratcliffe Stadium; Fresno, CA	W 18–17	6,918–7,500	
October 15	Cal Poly	Ratcliffe Stadium; Fresno, CA	W 14–7	11,016–13,000	
October 22	at Cal State Los Angeles	Rose Bowl; Pasadena, CA	W 14–7	5,000	
October 29	at No. 2 San Diego State	Aztec Bowl; San Diego, CA (rivalry)	L 13–34	15,178	
November 5	Long Beach State	Ratcliffe Stadium; Fresno, CA	L 20–28	7,452–9,000	
November 12	Pacific (CA)*	Ratcliffe Stadium; Fresno, CA	W 16–14	8,429	
November 19	at San Jose State*	Spartan Stadium; San Jose, CA (rivalry)	W 15–13	5,400	
*Non-conference game; Rankings from AP Poll released prior to the game

== Team players in the NFL/AFL ==
The following were selected in the 1967 NFL/AFL draft.

Player	Position	Round	Overall	NFL team
Bill Wilsey	Linebacker	10	246	Pittsburgh Steelers
Walt Richardson	Defensive tackle	14	356	Los Angeles Rams

The following finished their college career in 1966, were not drafted, but played in the AFL.

Player	Position	First AFL team
Curt Frazier	Defensive back	1968 Cincinnati Bengals
