= 1967 Cal State Hayward Pioneers football team =

American college football season

1967 Cal State Hayward Pioneers football
- Conference: Far Western Conference
- Record: 7–3 (3–3 FWC)
- Head coach: Les Davis (2nd season)
- Home stadium: Pioneer Stadium

1967 Far Western Conference football standings
	Conf.					Overall
Team	W		L		T	W		L		T
No. 17 San Francisco State $	6	–	0	–	0	9	–	2	–	0
Sacramento State	4	–	2	–	0	7	–	3	–	0
Humboldt State	3	–	2	–	1	6	–	3	–	1
Cal State Hayward	3	–	3	–	0	7	–	3	–	0
Nevada	2	–	3	–	1	4	–	4	–	1
UC Davis	2	–	4	–	0	3	–	6	–	0
Chico State	0	–	6	–	0	2	–	8	–	0
$ – Conference champion; Rankings from UPI small college poll

The 1967 Cal State Hayward Pioneers football team represented California State College at Hayward—now known California State University, East Bay—as a member of the Far Western Conference (FWC) during the 1967 NCAA College Division football season. Led by second-year head coach Les Davis, Cal State Hayward compiled an overall record of 7–3 with a mark of 3–3 in conference play, placing fourth in the FWC. The team outscored its opponents 419 to 231 for the season. The Pioneers played home games at Pioneer Stadium in Hayward, California.

== Schedule ==
Date	Opponent	Site	Result	Attendance	Source
September 16	at Redlands*	Redlands Stadium (Note: This stadium is the predecessor to the current Ted Runner Stadium on the University of Redlands campus, which was opened for the 1968 season); Redlands, CA	W 25–7	2,500	
September 23	at Pomona*	Alumni Field (Note: Merritt Field was known as Alumni Field until 1991.); Claremont, CA	W 33–17	2,000	
September 30	Oregon Tech*	Pioneer Stadium; Hayward, CA	W 59–0	2,800	
October 7	Humboldt State	Pioneer Stadium; Hayward, CA	W 47–23	3,000–3,300	
October 14	UC Davis	Pioneer Stadium; Hayward, CA	W 40–19	4,000	
October 21	at San Francisco State	Cox Stadium; San Francisco, CA	L 44–66	4,500–4,800	
October 28	at Nevada	Mackay Stadium; Reno, NV	L 7–23	2,800	
November 4	Chico State	Pioneer Stadium; Hayward, CA	W 68–28	3,100–4,200	
November 11	San Francisco*	Pioneer Stadium; Hayward, CA	W 77–20	2,900	
November 18	at Sacramento State	Hornet Stadium; Sacramento, CA	L 19–28	2,071	
*Non-conference game
