= 1966 Valley State Matadors football team =

American college football season

1966 Valley State Matadors football
- Conference: California Collegiate Athletic Association
- Record: 2–7–1 (0–5 CCAA)
- Head coach: Sam Winningham (5th season)
- Home stadium: Birmingham High School

1966 California Collegiate Athletic Association football standings
	Conf.					Overall
Team	W		L		T	W		L		T
No. 1/1 San Diego State $	5	–	0	–	0	11	–	0	–	0
Fresno State	3	–	2	–	0	7	–	3	–	0
Long Beach State	3	–	2	–	0	6	–	3	–	0
Cal Poly	2	–	3	–	0	6	–	4	–	0
Cal State Los Angeles	2	–	3	–	0	4	–	6	–	0
Valley State	0	–	5	–	0	2	–	7	–	1
$ – Conference champion; Rankings from AP/UPI small college polls

The 1966 Valley State Matadors football team represented San Fernando Valley State College—now known as California State University, Northridge—as a member of the California Collegiate Athletic Association (CCAA) during the 1966 NCAA College Division football season. Led by fifth-year head coach Sam Winningham, Valley State compiled an overall record of 2–7–1 with a mark of 0–5 in conference play, placing last out of six teams in the CCAA. The team was outscored 260–152 for the season. The Matadors played home games at Birmingham High School in Van Nuys, California.

== Schedule ==
Date	Opponent	Site	Result	Attendance	Source
September 17	Whittier*	Birmingham High School; Van Nuys, CA	T 7–7	4,000	
September 24	at Occidental*	Occidental Stadium; Los Angeles, CA	W 14–10	1,000	
October 1	Long Beach State	Birmingham High School; Van Nuys, CA	L 20–24	5,000–6,000	
October 8	at Fresno State	Ratcliffe Stadium; Fresno, CA	L 17–18	6,918–7,500	
October 15	Santa Clara*	Birmingham High School; Van Nuys, CA	W 17–14	6,500	
October 22	at Cal Poly	Mustang Stadium; San Luis Obispo, CA	L 22–28	5,400–5,600	
October 29	UC Santa Barbara*	Birmingham High School; Van Nuys, CA	L 12–38	5,000–6,000	
November 5	at Cal Poly Pomona*	Kellogg Field; Pomona, CA	L 24–49	2,500–4,000	
November 12	at No. 1 San Diego State	Aztec Bowl; San Diego, CA	L 0–21	10,000–10,423	
November 19	Cal State Los Angeles	Birmingham High School; Van Nuys, CA	L 19–51	6,000–6,500	
*Non-conference game; Rankings from AP Poll released prior to the game
