= Bob Howard (American football) =

American football player (1944–2008)

No. 24, 23
- Position: Defensive back

Personal information
- Born: November 24, 1944; Tallulah, Louisiana, U.S.
- Died: April 7, 2008 (aged 63); San Diego, California, U.S.
- Listed height: 6 ft 2 in (1.88 m)
- Listed weight: 174 lb (79 kg)

Career information
- High school: San Bernardino (San Bernardino, California)
- College: Cal Poly-San Luis Obispo; San Diego State
- NFL draft: 1967: 2nd round, 48th overall pick
- AFL draft: 1965: 10th round, 77th overall pick

Career history
- San Diego Chargers (1967-1974); New England Patriots (1975–1977); Philadelphia Eagles (1978–1979)

Career NFL/AFL statistics
- Interceptions: 32
- Fumble recoveries: 10
- Touchdowns: 1
- Stats at Pro Football Reference

Robert Lee Howard (November 24, 1944 – April 7, 2008) was an American professional football defensive back. He played in the American Football League (AFL) for the San Diego Chargers, where he was a second-round selection in the 1967 Common Draft. He also played for the Chargers, Philadelphia Eagles, and New England Patriots in the National Football League (NFL).

== College career ==
Howard first played college football in 1963 at Cal Poly San Luis Obispo, competing for the Mustangs' "Colts" squad during the era when collegiate programs had junior varsity and freshman-level squads.

He later transferred to San Diego State University, where he had been recruited by Don Coryell. Howard played for the Aztecs in the falls of 1965 and 1966, and was selected for All-CCAA First Team status as a senior.

== Personal ==
Howard married Barbara Howard after graduating from San Bernardino High School. They had three children, two girls and a boy.

Bob Howard died of cancer on April 7, 2008.

== See also ==
- List of American Football League players
