= 1967 Sacramento State Hornets football team =

American college football season

1967 Sacramento State Hornets football
- Conference: Far Western Conference
- Record: 7–3 (4–2 FWC)
- Head coach: Ray Clemons (7th season)
- Home stadium: Charles C. Hughes Stadium, Hornet Stadium

1967 Far Western Conference football standings
	Conf.					Overall
Team	W		L		T	W		L		T
No. 17 San Francisco State $	6	–	0	–	0	9	–	2	–	0
Sacramento State	4	–	2	–	0	7	–	3	–	0
Humboldt State	3	–	2	–	1	6	–	3	–	1
Cal State Hayward	3	–	3	–	0	7	–	3	–	0
Nevada	2	–	3	–	1	4	–	4	–	1
UC Davis	2	–	4	–	0	3	–	6	–	0
Chico State	0	–	6	–	0	2	–	8	–	0
$ – Conference champion; Rankings from UPI small college poll

The 1967 Sacramento State Hornets football team represented Sacramento State College—now known as California State University, Sacramento—as a member of the Far Western Conference (FWC) during the 1967 NCAA College Division football season. Led by seventh-year head coach Ray Clemons, Sacramento State compiled an overall record of 7–3 with a mark of 4–2 in conference play, placing second in the FWC. The team outscored its opponents 198 to 170 for the season. The Hornets played home games at Charles C. Hughes Stadium and Hornet Stadium in Sacramento, California.

== Schedule ==
Date	Time	Opponent	Site	Result	Attendance	Source
September 23	2:00 p.m.	Cal Poly*	Charles C. Hughes Stadium; Sacramento, CA	L 7–17	5,200–5,300	
September 30		at Cal Poly Pomona*	Kellogg Field; Pomona, CA	W 16–13	2,000	
October 7		at Portland State*	Civic Stadium; Portland, OR	W 23–21	725	
October 14		at Humboldt State	Redwood Bowl; Arcata, CA	L 20–28	3,500	
October 20		at UC Davis	Toomey Field; Davis, CA (rivalry)	W 23–6	7,200	
October 28	2:00 p.m.	San Francisco State^{†}	Hornet Stadium; Sacramento, CA	L 20–28	5,917–6,500	
November 4	2:00 p.m.	Nevada	Hornet Stadium; Sacramento, CA	W 14–7	3,051	
November 11		at Chico State	College Field; Chico, CA	W 20–17	6,000–6,800	
November 18		Cal State Hayward	Hornet Stadium; Sacramento, CA	W 28–19	2,071	
November 25	2:00 p.m.	Cal Western*	Hornet Stadium; Sacramento, CA	W 27–14	2,000	
*Non-conference game; ^{†}Homecoming
