= 1967 Nevada Wolf Pack football team =

American college football season

1967 Nevada Wolf Pack football
- Conference: Far Western Conference
- Record: 4–4–1 (2–3–1 FWC)
- Head coach: Dick Trachok (9th season)
- Home stadium: Mackay Stadium

1967 Far Western Conference football standings
	Conf.					Overall
Team	W		L		T	W		L		T
No. 17 San Francisco State $	6	–	0	–	0	9	–	2	–	0
Sacramento State	4	–	2	–	0	7	–	3	–	0
Humboldt State	3	–	2	–	1	6	–	3	–	1
Cal State Hayward	3	–	3	–	0	7	–	3	–	0
Nevada	2	–	3	–	1	4	–	4	–	1
UC Davis	2	–	4	–	0	3	–	6	–	0
Chico State	0	–	6	–	0	2	–	8	–	0
$ – Conference champion; Rankings from UPI small college poll

The 1967 Nevada Wolf Pack football team represented the University of Nevada during the 1967 NCAA College Division football season. Nevada competed as a member of the Far Western Conference (FWC). The Wolf Pack were led by ninth-year head coach Dick Trachok and played their home games at Mackay Stadium.

== Schedule ==
Date	Time	Opponent	Site	Result	Attendance	Source
September 23		Willamette*	Mackay Stadium; Reno, NV	W 32–15	4,500	
September 30		at UC Santa Barbara*	Campus Stadium; Santa Barbara, CA	L 7–34	7,135	
October 7		at San Francisco State	Cox Stadium; San Francisco, CA	L 6–34	1,500	
October 14		at San Francisco*	Kezar Stadium; San Francisco, CA	W 21–14		
October 21		Chico State^{†}	Mackay Stadium; Reno, NV	W 27–6	6,000	
October 28		Cal State Hayward	Mackay Stadium; Reno, NV	W 23–7	2,800	
November 4	2:00 p.m.	at Sacramento State	Hornet Stadium; Sacramento, CA	L 7–14	3,051	
November 11		at Humboldt State	Redwood Bowl; Arcata, CA	T 7–7	4,500	
November 18		UC Davis	Mackay Stadium; Reno, NV	L 20–28	1,000	
*Non-conference game; ^{†}Homecoming; All times are in Pacific time
