= 1966 Cal Poly Mustangs football team =

American college football season

1966 Cal Poly Mustangs football
- Conference: California Collegiate Athletic Association
- Record: 6–4 (2–3 CCAA)
- Head coach: Sheldon Harden (5th season)
- Home stadium: Mustang Stadium

1966 California Collegiate Athletic Association football standings
	Conf.					Overall
Team	W		L		T	W		L		T
No. 1/1 San Diego State $	5	–	0	–	0	11	–	0	–	0
Fresno State	3	–	2	–	0	7	–	3	–	0
Long Beach State	3	–	2	–	0	6	–	3	–	0
Cal Poly	2	–	3	–	0	6	–	4	–	0
Cal State Los Angeles	2	–	3	–	0	4	–	6	–	0
Valley State	0	–	5	–	0	2	–	7	–	1
$ – Conference champion; Rankings from AP/UPI small college polls

The 1966 Cal Poly Mustangs football team represented California Polytechnic State College—now known as California Polytechnic State University, San Luis Obispo—as a member of the California Collegiate Athletic Association (CCAA) during the 1966 NCAA College Division football season. Led by fifth-year head coach Sheldon Harden, Cal Poly compiled an overall record of 6–4 with a mark of 2–3 in conference play, tying for fourth place in the CCAA. The Mustangs played home games at Mustang Stadium in San Luis Obispo, California.

== Schedule ==
Date	Opponent	Site	Result	Attendance	Source
September 17	San Francisco State*	Mustang Stadium; San Luis Obispo, CA	L 0–38	3,636–4,200	
September 24	Linfield*	Mustang Stadium; San Luis Obispo, CA	W 22–7	5,520	
October 1	San Diego State	Mustang Stadium; San Luis Obispo, CA	L 13–14	4,980	
October 8	at Cal Western*	Balboa Stadium?; San Diego, CA	W 21–3	25,870	
October 15	at Fresno State	Ratcliffe Stadium; Fresno, CA	L 7–14	11,016–13,000	
October 22	Valley State	Mustang Stadium; San Luis Obispo, CA	W 28–22	5,400–5,600	
October 29	at Long Beach State	Veterans Stadium; Long Beach, CA	L 0–32	5,779	
November 5	Cal State Los Angeles	Mustang Stadium; San Luis Obispo, CA	W 14–10	4,400	
November 12	Santa Clara*	Mustang Stadium; San Luis Obispo, CA	W 34–32	2,600	
November 19	at UC Santa Barbara*	Campus Stadium; Santa Barbara, CA	W 14–10	6,500–7,000	
*Non-conference game
