= 1967 Humboldt State Lumberjacks football team =

American college football season

1967 Humboldt State Lumberjacks football
- Conference: Far Western Conference
- Record: 6–3–1 (3–2–1 FWC)
- Head coach: Bud Van Deren (2nd season)
- Home stadium: Redwood Bowl

1967 Far Western Conference football standings
	Conf.					Overall
Team	W		L		T	W		L		T
No. 17 San Francisco State $	6	–	0	–	0	9	–	2	–	0
Sacramento State	4	–	2	–	0	7	–	3	–	0
Humboldt State	3	–	2	–	1	6	–	3	–	1
Cal State Hayward	3	–	3	–	0	7	–	3	–	0
Nevada	2	–	3	–	1	4	–	4	–	1
UC Davis	2	–	4	–	0	3	–	6	–	0
Chico State	0	–	6	–	0	2	–	8	–	0
$ – Conference champion; Rankings from UPI small college poll

The 1967 Humboldt State Lumberjacks football team represented Humboldt State College—now known as California State Polytechnic University, Humboldt—as a member of the Far Western Conference (FWC) during the 1967 NCAA College Division football season. Led by second-year head coach Bud Van Deren, the Lumberjacks compiled an overall record of 6–3–1 with a mark of 3–2–1 in conference play, placing third in the FWC. The team outscored its opponents 242 to 227 for the season. Humboldt State played home games at the Redwood Bowl in Arcata, California.

== Schedule ==
Date	Opponent	Site	Result	Attendance	Source
September 16	Eastern Washington*	Redwood Bowl; Arcata, CA	L 14–17	4,500	
September 30	Whitworth*	Redwood Bowl; Arcata, CA	W 30–13	4,000	
October 7	at Cal State Hayward	Pioneer Stadium; Hayward, CA	L 23–47	3,000–3,300	
October 14	Sacramento State	Redwood Bowl; Arcata, CA	W 28–20	3,500	
October 21	Hawaii*	Redwood Bowl; Arcata, CA	W 13–0	3,000–3,500	
October 28	UC Davis	Redwood Bowl; Arcata, CA	W 34–18	4,600–5,000	
November 4	at San Francisco State	Cox Stadium; San Francisco, CA	L 34–68	3,500	
November 11	Nevada	Redwood Bowl; Arcata, CA	T 7–7	4,500	
November 18	at Chico State	College Field; Chico, CA	W 27–15	2,000–3,000	
November 23	San Francisco*	Redwood Bowl; Arcata, CA	W 32–22	3,000	
*Non-conference game

== Team players in the NFL ==
The following Humboldt State players were selected in the 1968 NFL/AFL draft.

Player	Position	Round	Overall	NFL team
Chuck Bailey	Tackle	13	337	Detroit Lions
