= 1967 Cal Poly Pomona Broncos football team =

American college football season

1967 Cal Poly Pomona Broncos football
- Conference: Independent
- Record: 2–8
- Head coach: Ray Daugherty (1st season)
- Home stadium: Kellogg Field

1967 NCAA College Division independents football records
| | Conf. | | | Overall |
| Team | W | L | T | W | | L | | T |
|---|---|---|---|---|---|---|---|---|
| Ashland | | – | | 8 | – | 0 | – | 1 |
| Northern Michigan | | – | | 9 | – | 1 | – | 0 |
| Indiana (PA) | | – | | 8 | – | 1 | – | 0 |
| Santa Clara | | – | | 8 | – | 1 | – | 0 |
| Northeastern | | – | | 7 | – | 1 | – | 0 |
| Wheaton (IL) | | – | | 7 | – | 2 | – | 0 |
| Samford | | – | | 8 | – | 2 | – | 1 |
| Wayne State (MI) | | – | | 6 | – | 2 | – | 0 |
| Chattanooga | | – | | 7 | – | 3 | – | 0 |
| Eastern Michigan | | – | | 6 | – | 3 | – | 0 |
| Tennessee A&I | | – | | 6 | – | 3 | – | 0 |
| Parsons | | – | | 6 | – | 3 | – | 1 |
| Kentucky State | | – | | 5 | – | 3 | – | 1 |
| Hawaii | | – | | 6 | – | 4 | – | 0 |
| St. Norbert | | – | | 5 | – | 4 | – | 0 |
| Akron | | – | | 4 | – | 4 | – | 1 |
| Carnegie Mellon | | – | | 4 | – | 4 | – | 0 |
| Cortland | | – | | 4 | – | 4 | – | 0 |
| Northern Arizona | | – | | 5 | – | 5 | – | 0 |
| Northern Illinois | | – | | 5 | – | 5 | – | 0 |
| UC Riverside | | – | | 4 | – | 4 | – | 1 |
| UC Santa Barbara | | – | | 5 | – | 5 | – | 0 |
| Drake | | – | | 4 | – | 5 | – | 0 |
| Pacific (CA) | | – | | 4 | – | 5 | – | 0 |
| Portland State | | – | | 4 | – | 6 | – | 0 |
| Lincoln (MO) | | – | | 3 | – | 5 | – | 0 |
| Boston University | | – | | 3 | – | 6 | – | 0 |
| Lake Forest | | – | | 3 | – | 6 | – | 0 |
| Milwaukee | | – | | 3 | – | 6 | – | 0 |
| Mississippi Valley State | | – | | 3 | – | 6 | – | 0 |
| Southern Illinois | | – | | 3 | – | 7 | – | 0 |
| Colorado College | | – | | 2 | – | 5 | – | 1 |
| Rose Poly | | – | | 1 | – | 6 | – | 2 |
| Tampa | | – | | 2 | – | 7 | – | 0 |
| Wabash | | – | | 2 | – | 7 | – | 0 |
| Cal Poly Pomona | | – | | 2 | – | 8 | – | 0 |

The 1967 Cal Poly Pomona Broncos football team represented California State Polytechnic College, Kellogg-Voorhis—now known as California State Polytechnic University, Pomona—as an independent during the 1967 NCAA College Division football season. Led by first-year head coach Ray Daugherty, Cal Poly Pomona compiled a record of 2–8. The team was outscored by its opponents 317 to 192 for the season. The Broncos played home games at Kellogg Field in Pomona, California.

Cal Poly Pomona joined the California Collegiate Athletic Association (CCAA) in 1967, but the football team's games in 1967 and 1968 did not count as conference play since they did not play a full conference schedule.

== Schedule ==
| Date | Opponent | Site | Result | Attendance | Source |
|---|---|---|---|---|---|
| September 16 | at Long Beach State | Veterans Stadium; Long Beach, CA | L 7–39 | 3,000 | |
| September 23 | Whittier | Kellogg Field; Pomona, CA | L 14–26 | 2,500 | |
| September 30 | Sacramento State | Kellogg Field; Pomona, CA | L 13–16 | 2,000 | |
| October 7 | at Redlands | Redlands Stadium; Redlands, CA | W 20–14 | 4,500 | |
| October 21 | UC Santa Barbara | Kellogg Field; Pomona, CA | L 14–31 | 1,000–2,500 | |
| October 28 | Chico State | Kellogg Field; Pomona, CA | W 33–28 | 1,500–4,000 | |
| November 4 | at Valley State | Birmingham High School; Van Nuys, CA | L 13–53 | 5,000–5,300 | |
| November 10 | at Occidental | D. W. Patterson Field; Los Angeles, CA | L 31–35 | 1,000 | |
| November 18 | No. 19 San Francisco State | Kellogg Field; Pomona, CA | L 29–47 | 1,500 | |
| November 25 | Santa Clara | Kellogg Field; Pomona, CA | L 18–28 | 1,500 | |
Rankings from UPI Coaches Poll released prior to the game
