= 1966 San Diego State Aztecs football team =

American college football season

1966 San Diego State Aztecs football

AP small college national champion; UPI small college national champion; CCAA champion; Camellia Bowl champion

Camellia Bowl, W 28–7 vs. Montana State
- Conference: California Collegiate Athletic Association

Ranking
- Coaches: No. 1 (UPI small college)
- AP: No. 1 (AP small college)
- Record: 11–0 (5–0 CCAA)
- Head coach: Don Coryell (6th season)
- Defensive coordinator: John Madden (3rd season)
- Home stadium: Aztec Bowl, Balboa Stadium

1966 California Collegiate Athletic Association football standings
	Conf.					Overall
Team	W		L		T	W		L		T
No. 1/1 San Diego State $	5	–	0	–	0	11	–	0	–	0
Fresno State	3	–	2	–	0	7	–	3	–	0
Long Beach State	3	–	2	–	0	6	–	3	–	0
Cal Poly	2	–	3	–	0	6	–	4	–	0
Cal State Los Angeles	2	–	3	–	0	4	–	6	–	0
Valley State	0	–	5	–	0	2	–	7	–	1
$ – Conference champion; Rankings from AP/UPI small college polls

The 1966 San Diego State Aztecs football team represented San Diego State College (Note: San Diego State University was known as San Diego State College from 1935–1971. See: San Diego State) during the 1966 NCAA College Division football season. San Diego State competed in the California Collegiate Athletic Association (CCAA). The team was led by head coach Don Coryell, in his sixth year, and played home games at both Aztec Bowl and Balboa Stadium.

They finished the season as champions of the CCAA, undefeated and untied with eleven wins and zero losses (11–0, 5–0 CCAA). The Aztecs finished the season ranked number 1 in both the AP and UPI small college polls. The offense scored 317 points during the season, while the defense only gave up 105.

At the end of the regular season, San Diego State qualified for the Camellia Bowl, which at the time was the Western Regional Final in the College Division of the NCAA. The Aztecs beat Montana State in the game, 28–7. The Aztecs were voted the College Division national champion at the end of the season.

== Schedule ==
Date	Opponent	Rank	Site	Result	Attendance	Source
September 17	Águilas Blancas IPN*		Aztec Bowl; San Diego, CA	W 45–0	10,843	
September 24	at No. 4 AP / 3 UPI Weber State*	No. 7 AP / 10 UPI	Wildcat Stadium; Ogden, UT	W 38–34	10,961–11,961	
October 1	at Cal Poly	No. 5 AP / 3 UPI	Mustang Stadium; San Luis Obispo, CA	W 14–13	4,980	
October 8	at No. 8 UPI Long Beach State	No. 6 AP / 4 UPI	Veterans Stadium; Long Beach, CA	W 21–18	13,187	
October 15	at San Jose State*	No. 4 AP / 3 UPI	Spartan Stadium; San Jose, CA	W 25–0	19,400	
October 29	Fresno State	No. 2 AP / 2 UPI	Aztec Bowl; San Diego, CA (rivalry)	W 34–13	15,178	
November 5	No. 1 AP / 1 UPI North Dakota State*	No. 2 AP / 2 UPI	Balboa Stadium; San Diego, CA	W 36–0	35,342	
November 12	Valley State	No. 1 AP / 1 UPI	Aztec Bowl; San Diego, CA	W 21–0	10,000–10,423	
November 19	Northern Arizona*^{†}	No. 1 AP / 1 UPI	Aztec Bowl; San Diego, CA	W 16–8	10,047	
November 26	Cal State Los Angeles	No. 1 AP / 1 UPI	Balboa Stadium; San Diego, CA	W 39–12	13,947	
December 10	No. 3 AP / 2 UPI Montana State*	No. 1 AP / 1 UPI	Charles C. Hughes Stadium; Sacramento, CA (Camellia Bowl)	W 28–7	15,740	
*Non-conference game; ^{†}Homecoming; Rankings from AP/UPI Poll released prior to the game

== Awards and honors ==
Award	Player
Most Valuable Player (John Simcox Memorial Trophy)	Don Horn
Outstanding Offensive & Defensive Linemen (Byron H. Chase Memorial Trophy)	Leo Carroll
Team captains Dr. R. Hardy / C.E. Peterson Memorial Trophy	Don Horn, Off; John Wittler, Def
Most Inspirational Player	John Wittler

== Team players in the NFL/AFL ==
The following San Diego State players were selected in the 1967 NFL/AFL draft.

Player	Position	Round	Overall	NFL team
Don Horn	Quarterback	1	25	Green Bay Packers
Leo Carroll	Defensive end	2	31	Atlanta Falcons
Don Shy	Running back	2	35	Pittsburgh Steelers
Bob Jones	Wide receiver	2	36	Chicago Bears
Bob Howard	Defensive back	2	48	San Diego Chargers
Nate Johns	Flanker	6	147	San Diego Chargers
John Williams	Defensive back	7	174	Philadelphia Eagles
Craig Scoggins	End	15	381	San Diego Chargers
