= 1967 Fresno State Bulldogs football team =

American college football season

1967 Fresno State Bulldogs football
- Conference: California Collegiate Athletic Association
- Record: 3–8 (3–2 CCAA)
- Head coach: Darryl Rogers (2nd season)
- Home stadium: Ratcliffe Stadium

1967 California Collegiate Athletic Association football standings
	Conf.					Overall
Team	W		L		T	W		L		T
No. 1/1 San Diego State $	5	–	0	–	0	10	–	1	–	0
Valley State	3	–	2	–	0	6	–	4	–	0
Long Beach State	3	–	2	–	0	5	–	5	–	0
Fresno State	3	–	2	–	0	3	–	8	–	0
Cal Poly	1	–	4	–	0	3	–	7	–	0
Cal State Los Angeles	0	–	5	–	0	1	–	9	–	0
$ – Conference champion; Rankings from AP/UPI small college polls

The 1967 Fresno State Bulldogs football team represented Fresno State College—now known as California State University, Fresno—as a member of the California Collegiate Athletic Association (CCAA) during the 1967 NCAA College Division football season. Led by second-year head coach Darryl Rogers, Fresno State compiled an overall record of 3–8 with a mark of 3–2 in conference play, tying for second place in the CCAA. The Bulldogs played home games at Ratcliffe Stadium on the campus of Fresno City College in Fresno, California.

== Schedule ==
Date	Opponent	Site	Result	Attendance	Source
September 16	Santa Clara*	Ratcliffe Stadium; Fresno, CA	L 16–24	9,172	
September 23	Idaho*	Ratcliffe Stadium; Fresno, CA	L 14–30	5,500–8,065	
September 30	No. 10 Montana State*	Ratcliffe Stadium; Fresno, CA	L 20–21	7,678–8,000	
October 7	at Valley State	Birmingham High School; Van Nuys, CA	W 31–25	5,500	
October 14	at Cal Poly	Mustang Stadium; San Luis Obispo, CA	W 41–14	7,000	
October 21	Cal State Los Angeles	Ratcliffe Stadium; Fresno, CA	W 14–3	9,347	
October 28	No. 1 San Diego State	Ratcliffe Stadium; Fresno, CA (rivalry)	L 21–28	12,276	
November 4	at Long Beach State	Veterans Stadium; Long Beach, CA	L 14–26	5,400	
November 11	at Pacific (CA)*	Pacific Memorial Stadium; Stockton, CA	L 20–32	10,550	
November 18	San Jose State*	Ratcliffe Stadium; Fresno, CA (rivalry)	L 30–35	4,500–5,336	
November 25	at Hawaii*	Honolulu Stadium; Honolulu, HI (rivalry)	L 19–29	18,000–18,500	
*Non-conference game; Rankings from AP Poll released prior to the game

== Team players in the NFL ==
The following were selected in the 1968 NFL/AFL draft.

Player	Position	Round	Overall	NFL team
Mike Freeman	Defensive back	4	89	Minnesota Vikings
Len McNeil	Guard	4	95	Philadelphia Eagles
