= 1967 Chico State Wildcats football team =

American college football season

1967 Chico State Wildcats football
- Conference: Far Western Conference
- Record: 2–8 (0–6 FWC)
- Head coach: George Maderos (10th season)
- Home stadium: College Field

1967 Far Western Conference football standings
	Conf.					Overall
Team	W		L		T	W		L		T
No. 17 San Francisco State $	6	–	0	–	0	9	–	2	–	0
Sacramento State	4	–	2	–	0	7	–	3	–	0
Humboldt State	3	–	2	–	1	6	–	3	–	1
Cal State Hayward	3	–	3	–	0	7	–	3	–	0
Nevada	2	–	3	–	1	4	–	4	–	1
UC Davis	2	–	4	–	0	3	–	6	–	0
Chico State	0	–	6	–	0	2	–	8	–	0
$ – Conference champion; Rankings from UPI small college poll

The 1967 Chico State Wildcats football team represented Chico State College—now known as California State University, Chico—as a member of the Far Western Conference (FWC) during the 1967 NCAA College Division football season. Led by George Maderos in his tenth and final season as head coach, Chico State compiled an overall record of 2–8 with a mark of 0–6 in conference play, placing last out of seven teams in the FWC. The team was outscored by its opponents 365 to 204 for the season. The Wildcats played home games at College Field in Chico, California.

Maderos finished his tenure at Chico State with overall record of 35–59–1, for a .374 winning percentage. This the lowest winning percentage of any of the eight Chico State head coaches who spent more than two years in the position.

== Schedule ==
Date	Opponent	Site	Result	Attendance	Source
September 16	San Francisco*	College Field; Chico, CA	W 31–30	5,300	
September 23	at Oregon Tech*	Klamath Falls, OR	L 21–29	2,500	
September 30	Southern Oregon*	College Field; Chico, CA	W 44–28	6,100	
October 6	at UC Davis	Toomey Field; Davis, CA	L 0–35	6,000–6,500	
October 14	San Francisco State	College Field; Chico, CA	L 14–68	6,000	
October 21	at Nevada	Mackay Stadium; Reno, NV	L 6–27	6,000	
October 28	at Cal Poly Pomona*	Kellogg Field; Pomona, CA	L 28–33	1,500–4,000	
November 4	at Cal State Hayward	Pioneer Stadium; Hayward, CA	L 28–68	3,100–4,200	
November 11	Sacramento State	College Field; Chico, CA	L 17–20	6,000–6,800	
November 18	Humboldt State	College Field; Chico, CA	L 15–27	2,000–3,000	
*Non-conference game
