= 1967 Cal Poly Mustangs football team =

American college football season

1967 Cal Poly Mustangs football
- Conference: California Collegiate Athletic Association
- Record: 3–7 (1–4 CCAA)
- Head coach: Sheldon Harden (6th season)
- Home stadium: Mustang Stadium

1967 California Collegiate Athletic Association football standings
	Conf.					Overall
Team	W		L		T	W		L		T
No. 1/1 San Diego State $	5	–	0	–	0	10	–	1	–	0
Valley State	3	–	2	–	0	6	–	4	–	0
Long Beach State	3	–	2	–	0	5	–	5	–	0
Fresno State	3	–	2	–	0	3	–	8	–	0
Cal Poly	1	–	4	–	0	3	–	7	–	0
Cal State Los Angeles	0	–	5	–	0	1	–	9	–	0
$ – Conference champion; Rankings from AP/UPI small college polls

The 1967 Cal Poly Mustangs football team represented California Polytechnic State College—now known as California Polytechnic State University, San Luis Obispo—as a member of the California Collegiate Athletic Association (CCAA) during the 1967 NCAA College Division football season. Led by Sheldon Harden in his sixth and final season as head coach, Cal Poly compiled an overall record of 3–7 with a mark of 1–4 in conference play, placing fifth in the CCAA. The Mustangs played home games at Mustang Stadium in San Luis Obispo, California.

== Schedule ==
Date	Time	Opponent	Site	Result	Attendance	Source
September 16		at San Francisco State*	Cox Stadium; San Francisco, CA	L 14–31	1,500–2,000	
September 23	2:00 p.m.	at Sacramento State*	Charles C. Hughes Stadium; Sacramento, CA	W 17–7	5,200–5,300	
September 30		at No. 1 San Diego State	San Diego Stadium; San Diego, CA	L 20–26	31,492–31,892	
October 7		Cal Western*	Mustang Stadium; San Luis Obispo, CA	L 13–14	6,800	
October 14		Fresno State	Mustang Stadium; San Luis Obispo, CA	L 14–41	7,000	
October 21		at Valley State	Birmingham High School; Van Nuys, CA	L 21–40	6,300	
October 28		Long Beach State	Mustang Stadium; San Luis Obispo, CA	L 0–29	5,250	
November 4		at Cal State Los Angeles	Rose Bowl; Pasadena, CA	W 16–6	2,300–2,724	
November 11		at Santa Clara*	Buck Shaw Stadium; Santa Clara, CA	L 7–28	9,845	
November 25		UC Santa Barbara*	Mustang Stadium; San Luis Obispo, CA	W 30–14	2,500	
*Non-conference game; Rankings from AP Poll released prior to the game

== Team players in the NFL ==
The following were selected in the 1968 NFL/AFL draft.

Player	Position	Round	Overall	NFL team
Cecil Turner	Flanker, wide receiver	5	127	Chicago Bears
