= 1967 Long Beach State 49ers football team =

American college football season

1967 Long Beach State 49ers football
- Conference: California Collegiate Athletic Association
- Record: 5–5 (3–2 CCAA)
- Head coach: Don Reed (10th season)
- Home stadium: Veterans Memorial Stadium

1967 California Collegiate Athletic Association football standings
	Conf.					Overall
Team	W		L		T	W		L		T
No. 1/1 San Diego State $	5	–	0	–	0	10	–	1	–	0
Valley State	3	–	2	–	0	6	–	4	–	0
Long Beach State	3	–	2	–	0	5	–	5	–	0
Fresno State	3	–	2	–	0	3	–	8	–	0
Cal Poly	1	–	4	–	0	3	–	7	–	0
Cal State Los Angeles	0	–	5	–	0	1	–	9	–	0
$ – Conference champion; Rankings from AP/UPI small college polls

The 1967 Long Beach State 49ers football team represented California State College, Long Beach—now known as California State University, Long Beach—as a member of the California Collegiate Athletic Association (CCAA) during the 1967 NCAA College Division football season. Led by tenth-year head coach Don Reed, the 49ers compiled an overall record of 5–5 with a mark of 3–2 in conference play, placing a three-way tie for second in the CCAA. The team played home games at Veterans Memorial Stadium adjacent to the campus of Long Beach City College in Long Beach, California.

== Schedule ==
Date	Opponent	Site	Result	Attendance	Source
September 16	Cal Poly Pomona*	Veterans Memorial Stadium; Long Beach, CA	W 39–7	3,000	
September 23	at San Francisco State*	Cox Stadium; San Francisco, CA	L 27–55	2,000	
September 29	Valley State	Veterans Memorial Stadium; Long Beach, CA	L 25–35	4,020	
October 7	at No. 1 San Diego State	San Diego Stadium; San Diego, CA	L 7–20	35,434	
October 14	at UC Santa Barbara*	Campus Stadium; Santa Barbara, CA	W 34–24	7,200	
October 20	Northern Arizona*	Veterans Memorial Stadium; Long Beach, CA	L 21–26	5,500	
October 28	at Cal Poly	Mustang Stadium; San Luis Obispo, CA	W 29–0	5,250	
November 4	Fresno State	Veterans Memorial Stadium; Long Beach, CA	W 26–14	5,400	
November 11	Cal State Los Angeles	Veterans Memorial Stadium; Long Beach, CA	W 9–0	5,627	
November 18	at Pacific (CA)*	Pacific Memorial Stadium; Stockton, CA	L 8–39	5,000	
*Non-conference game; Rankings from AP Poll released prior to the game

== Team players in the NFL ==
The following were selected in the 1968 NFL/AFL draft.

Player	Position	Round	Overall	NFL team
Phil Johnson	Defensive back	9	220	Cincinnati Bengals
