= 1967 Valley State Matadors football team =

American college football season

1967 Valley State Matadors football

Pasadena Bowl, L 13–35 vs. West Texas State
- Conference: California Collegiate Athletic Association
- Record: 6–4 (3–2 CCAA)
- Head coach: Sam Winningham (6th season)
- Home stadium: Birmingham High School

1967 California Collegiate Athletic Association football standings
	Conf.					Overall
Team	W		L		T	W		L		T
No. 1/1 San Diego State $	5	–	0	–	0	10	–	1	–	0
Valley State	3	–	2	–	0	6	–	4	–	0
Long Beach State	3	–	2	–	0	5	–	5	–	0
Fresno State	3	–	2	–	0	3	–	8	–	0
Cal Poly	1	–	4	–	0	3	–	7	–	0
Cal State Los Angeles	0	–	5	–	0	1	–	9	–	0
$ – Conference champion; Rankings from AP/UPI small college polls

The 1967 Valley State Matadors football team represented San Fernando Valley State College—now known as California State University, Northridge—as a member of the California Collegiate Athletic Association (CCAA) during the 1967 NCAA College Division football season. Led by sixth-year head coach Sam Winningham, Valley State compiled an overall record of 6–4 with a mark of 3–2 in conference play, tying for second place in the CCAA. This was the first winning season for the Matadors in their sixth year of existence. At the end of the regular season, conference champion San Diego State qualified for a berth in one of the college division regional championship games (the Camellia Bowl), so second-place Valley State was chosen to represent the CCAA in the Pasadena Bowl.In their first bowl game appearance, the Matadors lost to West Texas State. Valley State played home games at Birmingham High School in Van Nuys, California.

== Schedule ==
Date	Opponent	Site	Result	Attendance	Source
September 16	at Whittier*	Memorial Stadium; Whittier, CA	W 30–7	2,100	
September 29	at Long Beach State	Veterans Stadium; Long Beach, CA	W 35–25	4,020	
October 7	Fresno State	Birmingham High School; Van Nuys, CA	L 25–31	5,500	
October 14	at Santa Clara*	Buck Shawn Stadium; Santa Clara, CA	L 14–34	7,200–7,220	
October 21	Cal Poly	Birmingham High School; Van Nuys, CA	W 40–21	6,300	
October 28	at UC Santa Barbara*	Campus Stadium; Santa Barbara, CA	W 28–27	6,500	
November 4	Cal Poly Pomona*^{†}	Birmingham High School; Van Nuys, CA	W 53–13	5,300	
November 11	No. 1 San Diego State	Birmingham High School; Van Nuys, CA	L 21–30	9,200	
November 18	at Cal State Los Angeles	Rose Bowl; Pasadena, CA	W 42–6	2,100–3,300	
December 2	vs. West Texas State*	Rose Bowl; Pasadena, CA (Pasadena Bowl)	L 13–35	23,802	
*Non-conference game; ^{†}Homecoming; Rankings from AP Poll released prior to the game

== Team players in the NFL ==
No Valley State players were selected in the 1968 NFL/AFL draft.

The following finished their college career in 1967, were not drafted, but played in the NFL.

Player	Position	First NFL team
Bruce Lemmerman	QB	1968 Atlanta Falcons
