= 1967 UC Davis Aggies football team =

American college football season

1967 UC Davis Aggies football
- Conference: Far Western Conference
- Record: 3–6 (2–4 FWC)
- Head coach: Herb Schmalenberger (5th season)
- Captains: Mike Way; George Ziser
- Home stadium: Toomey Field

1967 Far Western Conference football standings
	Conf.					Overall
Team	W		L		T	W		L		T
No. 17 San Francisco State $	6	–	0	–	0	9	–	2	–	0
Sacramento State	4	–	2	–	0	7	–	3	–	0
Humboldt State	3	–	2	–	1	6	–	3	–	1
Cal State Hayward	3	–	3	–	0	7	–	3	–	0
Nevada	2	–	3	–	1	4	–	4	–	1
UC Davis	2	–	4	–	0	3	–	6	–	0
Chico State	0	–	6	–	0	2	–	8	–	0
$ – Conference champion; Rankings from UPI small college poll

The 1967 UC Davis Aggies football team represented the University of California, Davis as a member of the Far Western Conference (FWC) during the 1967 NCAA College Division football season. Led by fifth-year head coach Herb Schmalenberger, the Aggies compiled an overall record of 3–6 with a mark of 2–4 in conference play, placing sixth in the FWC. The team was outscored by its opponents 212 to 164 for the season. The Aggies played home games at Toomey Field in Davis, California.

The UC Davis sports teams were commonly called the "Cal Aggies" from 1924 until the mid 1970s.

== Schedule ==
Date	Opponent	Site	Result	Attendance	Source
September 23	at UC Riverside*	Highlander Stadium; Riverside, CA	W 19–6	2,000–3,200	
September 30	at Occidental*	D.W. Patterson Field; Los Angeles, CA	L 14–19	1,500	
October 6	Chico State	Toomey Field; Davis, CA	W 35–0	6,000–6,500	
October 14	at Cal State Hayward	Pioneer Stadium; Hayward, CA	L 19–40	4,000	
October 20	Sacramento State	Toomey Field; Davis, CA (rivalry)	L 6–23	7,200	
October 28	at Humboldt State	Redwood Bowl; Arcata, CA	L 18–34	4,600–5,000	
November 4	Santa Clara*	Toomey Field; Davis, CA	L 8–49	5,800	
November 11	San Francisco State	Toomey Field; Davis, CA	L 17–21	3,700–4,500	
November 18	at Nevada	Mackay Stadium; Reno, NV	W 28–20	1,000	
*Non-conference game
