= 1966 Cal State Los Angeles Diablos football team =

American college football season

1966 Cal State Los Angeles Diablos football
- Conference: California Collegiate Athletic Association
- Record: 4–6 (2–3 CCAA)
- Head coach: Jim Williams (1st season)
- Home stadium: Rose Bowl

1966 California Collegiate Athletic Association football standings
	Conf.					Overall
Team	W		L		T	W		L		T
No. 1/1 San Diego State $	5	–	0	–	0	11	–	0	–	0
Fresno State	3	–	2	–	0	7	–	3	–	0
Long Beach State	3	–	2	–	0	6	–	3	–	0
Cal Poly	2	–	3	–	0	6	–	4	–	0
Cal State Los Angeles	2	–	3	–	0	4	–	6	–	0
Valley State	0	–	5	–	0	2	–	7	–	1
$ – Conference champion; Rankings from AP/UPI small college polls

The 1966 Cal State Los Angeles Diablos football team represented California State College at Los Angeles—now known as California State University, Los Angeles—as a member of the California Collegiate Athletic Association (CCAA) during the 1966 NCAA College Division football season. Led by first-year head coach Jim Williams, Cal State Los Angeles compiled an overall record of 4–6 with a mark of 2–3 in conference play, tying for fourth place in the CCAA. The Diablos played home games at the Rose Bowl in Pasadena, California.

== Schedule ==
Date	Opponent	Site	Result	Attendance	Source
September 17	at Pacific (CA)*	Pacific Memorial Stadium; Stockton, CA	L 7–30	10,000–16,000	
September 24	Texas A&I*	Rose Bowl; Pasadena, CA	W 10–9	3,388	
October 1	at No. 9 Weber State*	Wildcat Stadium; Ogden, UT	L 7–70	9,779	
October 8	at Parsons*	Blum Stadium; Fairfield, IA	L 7–37	7,300	
October 22	Fresno State	Rose Bowl; Pasadena, CA	L 7–14	5,000	
October 29	Abilene Christian*	Rose Bowl; Pasadena, CA	W 23–7	4,450–4,458	
November 5	at Cal Poly	Mustang Stadium; San Luis Obispo, CA	L 10–14	4,400	
November 12	Long Beach State^{†}	Rose Bowl; Pasadena, CA	W 17–13	7,454	
November 19	at Valley State	Birmingham High School; Van Nuys, CA	W 51–19	6,000–6,500	
November 26	at No. 1 San Diego State	Balboa Stadium; San Diego, CA	L 12–39	13,147–13,947	
*Non-conference game; ^{†}Homecoming; Rankings from AP Poll released prior to the game

== Team players in the NFL ==
The following Cal State Los Angeles players were selected in the 1967 NFL/AFL draft.

Player	Position	Round	Overall	NFL team
Philip Spiller	Defensive back	16	410	St. Louis Cardinals
