= 1967 San Francisco State Gators football team =

American college football season

1967 San Francisco State Gators football

FWC champion

Camellia Bowl, L 6–27 vs. San Diego State
- Conference: Far Western Conference
- Record: 9–2 (6–0 FWC)
- Head coach: Vic Rowen (7th season)
- Home stadium: Cox Stadium

1967 Far Western Conference football standings
	Conf.					Overall
Team	W		L		T	W		L		T
No. 17 San Francisco State $	6	–	0	–	0	9	–	2	–	0
Sacramento State	4	–	2	–	0	7	–	3	–	0
Humboldt State	3	–	2	–	1	6	–	3	–	1
Cal State Hayward	3	–	3	–	0	7	–	3	–	0
Nevada	2	–	3	–	1	4	–	4	–	1
UC Davis	2	–	4	–	0	3	–	6	–	0
Chico State	0	–	6	–	0	2	–	8	–	0
$ – Conference champion; Rankings from UPI small college poll

The 1967 San Francisco State Gators football team represented San Francisco State College—now known as San Francisco State University—as a member of the Far Western Conference (FWC) during the 1967 NCAA College Division football season. Led by seventh-year head coach Vic Rowen, San Francisco State compiled an overall record of 9–2 with a mark of 6–0 in conference play, winning the FWC for the fifth time in seven years. For the season the team outscored its opponents 235 to 134. The Gators played home games at Cox Stadium in San Francisco.

San Francisco State was invited to Camellia Bowl, the western regional final for the NCAA College Division, played in Sacramento, California. The Gators lost the game to No. 1-ranked San Diego State, 27–6.

== Schedule ==
Date	Time	Opponent	Rank	Site	Result	Attendance	Source
September 16		Cal Poly*		Cox Stadium; San Francisco, CA	W 31–14	1,500–2,000	
September 23		Long Beach State*		Cox Stadium; San Francisco, CA	W 55–27	2,000	
September 30		at Santa Clara*	No. 16	Buck Shaw Stadium; Santa Clara, CA	L 21–28	9,600	
October 7		Nevada		Cox Stadium; San Francisco, CA	W 34–6	1,500	
October 14		at Chico State		College Field; Chico, CA	W 68–14	6,000	
October 21		Cal State Hayward		Cox Stadium; San Francisco, CA	W 66–44	4,500–4,800	
October 28	2:00 p.m.	Sacramento State		Hornet Stadium; Sacramento, CA	W 28–20	5,917–6,500	
November 4		Humboldt State		Cox Stadium; San Francisco, CA	W 68–34	3,500	
November 11		at UC Davis		Toomey Field; Davis, CA	W 21–17	3,700–4,500	
November 18		at Cal Poly Pomona*	No. 19	Kellogg Field; Pomona, CA	W 47–29	1,500	
December 9		vs. No. 1 San Diego State*	No. 17	Charles C. Hughes Stadium; Sacramento, CA (Camellia Bowl)	L 6–27	15,710	
*Non-conference game; Rankings from UPI Coaches Poll released prior to the game; All times are in Pacific time

== Team players in the NFL ==
The following San Francisco State players were selected in the 1968 NFL/AFL draft.

Player	Position	Round	Overall	NFL team
Joe Koontz	Wide receiver	9	234	New York Giants
Jim Schmidt	Defensive back	17	437	Atlanta Falcons
