= 1967 Cal State Los Angeles Diablos football team =

American college football season

1967 Cal State Los Angeles Diablos football
- Conference: California Collegiate Athletic Association
- Record: 1–9 (0–5 CCAA)
- Head coach: Jim Williams (2nd season)
- Home stadium: Rose Bowl

1967 California Collegiate Athletic Association football standings
	Conf.					Overall
Team	W		L		T	W		L		T
No. 1/1 San Diego State $	5	–	0	–	0	10	–	1	–	0
Valley State	3	–	2	–	0	6	–	4	–	0
Long Beach State	3	–	2	–	0	5	–	5	–	0
Fresno State	3	–	2	–	0	3	–	8	–	0
Cal Poly	1	–	4	–	0	3	–	7	–	0
Cal State Los Angeles	0	–	5	–	0	1	–	9	–	0
$ – Conference champion; Rankings from AP/UPI small college polls

The 1967 Cal State Los Angeles Diablos football team represented California State College at Los Angeles—now known as California State University, Los Angeles—as a member of the California Collegiate Athletic Association (CCAA) during the 1967 NCAA College Division football season. Led by second-year head coach Jim Williams, Cal State Los Angeles compiled an overall record of 1–9 with a mark of 0–5 in conference play, placing last out of six teams in the CCAA. The Diablos played home games at the Rose Bowl in Pasadena, California.

== Schedule ==
Date	Opponent	Site	Result	Attendance	Source
September 16	at UT Arlington*	Memorial Stadium; Arlington, TX	L 14–17	8,000	
September 30	at Parsons (IA)*	Blum Stadium; Fairfield, IA	L 3–19	5,000	
October 7	at Weber State*	Wildcat Stadium; Ogden, UT	L 3–13	6,800–6,857	
October 14	No. 1 San Diego State	Rose Bowl; Pasadena, CA	L 0–28	9,409–9,709	
October 21	at Fresno State	Ratcliffe Stadium; Fresno, CA	L 3–14	9,347–10,600	
October 28	at Hawaii*	Honolulu Stadium; Honolulu, HI	W 9–3	16,842–17,000	
November 4	Cal Poly^{†}	Rose Bowl; Pasadena, CA	L 6–16	2,300–2,724	
November 11	at Long Beach State	Veterans Stadium; Long Beach, CA	L 0–9	5,627–5,800	
November 18	Valley State	Rose Bowl; Pasadena, CA	L 6–42	2,100–3,300	
November 25	Bowling Green*	Rose Bowl; Pasadena, CA	L 27–42	2,414–2,464	
*Non-conference game; ^{†}Homecoming; Rankings from AP Poll released prior to the game
