= 1967 San Diego State Aztecs football team =

American college football season

1967 San Diego State Aztecs football

AP small college national champion; UPI small college national champion; CCAA champion; Camellia Bowl champion

Camellia Bowl, W 27–6 vs. San Francisco State
- Conference: California Collegiate Athletic Association

Ranking
- Coaches: No. 1 (UPI small college)
- AP: No. 1 (AP small college)
- Record: 10–1 (5–0 CCAA)
- Head coach: Don Coryell (7th season)
- Home stadium: San Diego Stadium

1967 California Collegiate Athletic Association football standings
	Conf.					Overall
Team	W		L		T	W		L		T
No. 1/1 San Diego State $	5	–	0	–	0	10	–	1	–	0
Valley State	3	–	2	–	0	6	–	4	–	0
Long Beach State	3	–	2	–	0	5	–	5	–	0
Fresno State	3	–	2	–	0	3	–	8	–	0
Cal Poly	1	–	4	–	0	3	–	7	–	0
Cal State Los Angeles	0	–	5	–	0	1	–	9	–	0
$ – Conference champion; Rankings from AP/UPI small college polls

The 1967 San Diego State Aztecs football team represented San Diego State College (Note: San Diego State University was known as San Diego State College from 1935 to 1971.) during the 1967 NCAA College Division football season.

This was San Diego State's last year in the California Collegiate Athletic Association (CCAA). They had been a member of the CCAA since its founding in 1939. The team was led by head coach Don Coryell, in his seventh year, and played home games at San Diego Stadium (Note: San Diego County Credit Union Stadium (SDCCU Stadium) was known as San Diego Stadium from its opening in 1967 through 1980.) in San Diego, California. This was the first season for the Aztecs in the brand new stadium.

They finished the season as champions of the CCAA, with ten wins and one loss (10–1, 5–0 CCAA). The offense scored 319 points during the season, while the defense only gave up 135. For the second season in a row, the Aztecs finished the season ranked number 1 in both the AP and UPI small college rankings. At the end of the regular season, San Diego State again qualified for the Camellia Bowl, which at the time was the Western Regional Final in the College Division of the NCAA. The Aztecs beat San Francisco State in the game, 27–6. The Aztecs were voted the College Division national champion for the second consecutive year.

== Schedule ==
Date	Opponent	Rank	Site	Result	Attendance	Source
September 15	Tennessee A&I*		San Diego Stadium; San Diego, CA	W 16–8	45,296	
September 23	Weber State*	No. 1 AP	San Diego Stadium; San Diego, CA	W 58–12	36,741	
September 30	Cal Poly	No. 1 AP / 1 UPI	San Diego Stadium; San Diego, CA	W 26–20	31,492	
October 7	Long Beach State	No. 1 AP / 1 UPI	San Diego Stadium; San Diego, CA	W 20–7	35,434	
October 14	at Cal State Los Angeles	No. 1 AP / 1 UPI	Rose Bowl; Pasadena, CA	W 28–0	9,409	
October 21	at Northern Illinois*	No. 1 AP / 1 UPI	Huskie Stadium; DeKalb, IL	W 47–6	12,537	
October 28	at Fresno State	No. 1 AP / 1 UPI	Ratcliffe Stadium; Fresno, CA (rivalry)	W 28–21	12,276	
November 11	at Valley State	No. 1 AP / 1 UPI	Birmingham High School; Van Nuys, CA	W 30–21	9,200	
November 18	Montana State*	No. 1 AP / 1 UPI	San Diego Stadium; San Diego, CA	W 14–3	47,125	
November 25	Utah State*	No. 1 AP / 1 UPI	San Diego Stadium; San Diego, CA	L 25–31	44,317	
December 9	No. 17 UPI San Francisco State*	No. 1 AP / 1 UPI	Charles C. Hughes Stadium; Sacramento, CA (Camellia Bowl)	W 27–6	15,710	
*Non-conference game; Rankings from AP/UPI Poll released prior to the game

== Team players in the NFL/AFL ==
Four Aztecs were selected in the 1968 NFL/AFL draft.

Player	Position	Round	Overall	Franchise
Haven Moses	Wide Receiver	1	9	Buffalo Bills
Steve Duich	Guard	5	121	Green Bay Packers
John Beck	Defensive Back	12	303	New Orleans Saints
Teddy Washington	Running Back	13	354	Cincinnati Bengals

The following finished their San Diego State career in 1967, were not drafted, but played in the NFL/AFL.

Player	Position	First NFL Team
Dave Ogas	Linebacker	1968 Oakland Raiders

== Team awards ==
Award	Player
Most Valuable Player (John Simcox Memorial Trophy)	Haven Moses
Outstanding Offensive & Defensive Linemen (Byron H. Chase Memorial Trophy)	Steve Duich
Team captains Dr. R. Hardy / C.E. Peterson Memorial Trophy	Haven Moses, Off; Cliff Hancock, Def
Most Inspirational Player	Cliff Hancock
