= 1966 Long Beach State 49ers football team =

American college football season

1966 Long Beach State 49ers football
- Conference: California Collegiate Athletic Association
- Record: 6–3 (3–2 CCAA)
- Head coach: Don Reed (9th season)
- Home stadium: Veterans Memorial Stadium

1966 California Collegiate Athletic Association football standings
	Conf.					Overall
Team	W		L		T	W		L		T
No. 1/1 San Diego State $	5	–	0	–	0	11	–	0	–	0
Fresno State	3	–	2	–	0	7	–	3	–	0
Long Beach State	3	–	2	–	0	6	–	3	–	0
Cal Poly	2	–	3	–	0	6	–	4	–	0
Cal State Los Angeles	2	–	3	–	0	4	–	6	–	0
Valley State	0	–	5	–	0	2	–	7	–	1
$ – Conference champion; Rankings from AP/UPI small college polls

The 1966 Long Beach State 49ers football team represented California State College, Long Beach—now known as California State University, Long Beach—as a California Collegiate Athletic Association (CCAA) member during the 1966 NCAA College Division football season. Led by ninth-year head coach Don Reed, the 49ers compiled an overall record of 6–3 with a mark of 3–2 in conference play, tying for second place in the CCAA. The team played home games at Veterans Memorial Stadium adjacent to the campus of Long Beach City College in Long Beach, California.

== Schedule ==
Date	Opponent	Site	Result	Attendance	Source
September 24	San Francisco State*	Veterans Memorial Stadium; Long Beach, CA	W 24–18	6,700	
October 1	at Valley State	Birmingham High School; Van Nuys, CA	W 24–20	5,000–6,000	
October 8	No. 6 San Diego State	Veterans Memorial Stadium; Long Beach, CA	L 18–21	13,187	
October 15	UC Santa Barbara*	Veterans Memorial Stadium; Long Beach, CA	W 48–14	5,491–5,500	
October 22	at Northern Arizona*	Lumberjack Stadium; Flagstaff, AZ	L 12–32	7,300	
October 29	Cal Poly	Veterans Memorial Stadium; Long Beach, CA	W 32–0	5,779	
November 5	at Fresno State	Ratcliffe Stadium; Fresno, CA	W 28–20	7,452–9,000	
November 12	at Cal State Los Angeles	Rose Bowl; Pasadena, CA	L 13–17	7,454	
November 18	Pacific (CA)*	Veterans Memorial Stadium; Long Beach, CA	W 34–14	6,000	
*Non-conference game; Rankings from AP Poll released prior to the game

== Team members in the NFL ==
The following player was selected in the 1967 NFL/AFL draft.

Player	Position	Round	Overall	NFL Team
Steve Newell	Wide Receiver	9	225	San Diego Chargers
