= Jack Murphy (sportswriter) =

American journalist (1923–1980)

- Born: February 5, 1923; Denver, Colorado, U.S.
- Died: September 24, 1980 (aged 57); Los Angeles, California, U.S.
- Occupation: Sportswriter
- Relatives: Bob Murphy (brother)

John Patrick Murphy (February 5, 1923 – September 24, 1980) was an American sportswriter and columnist for the San Diego Union from 1951 to 1980. Jack Murphy Stadium was named in his honor.

== Background ==
Murphy was born on February 5, 1923, in Denver. He was the older brother of Bob Murphy, a New York Mets broadcaster. He moved from Fort Worth, Texas, in 1951 to become a sportswriter for the San Diego Union newspaper. On December 21, 1960, Jack Murphy wrote a column for the San Diego Union proposing that the Los Angeles Chargers of the American Football League (AFL) should become a San Diego franchise. For a year in Union articles, he was a key figure who implored San Diegans to move the Chargers. He helped secure the San Diego Padres as a National League MLB expansion team in 1969.

== Jack Murphy Stadium ==
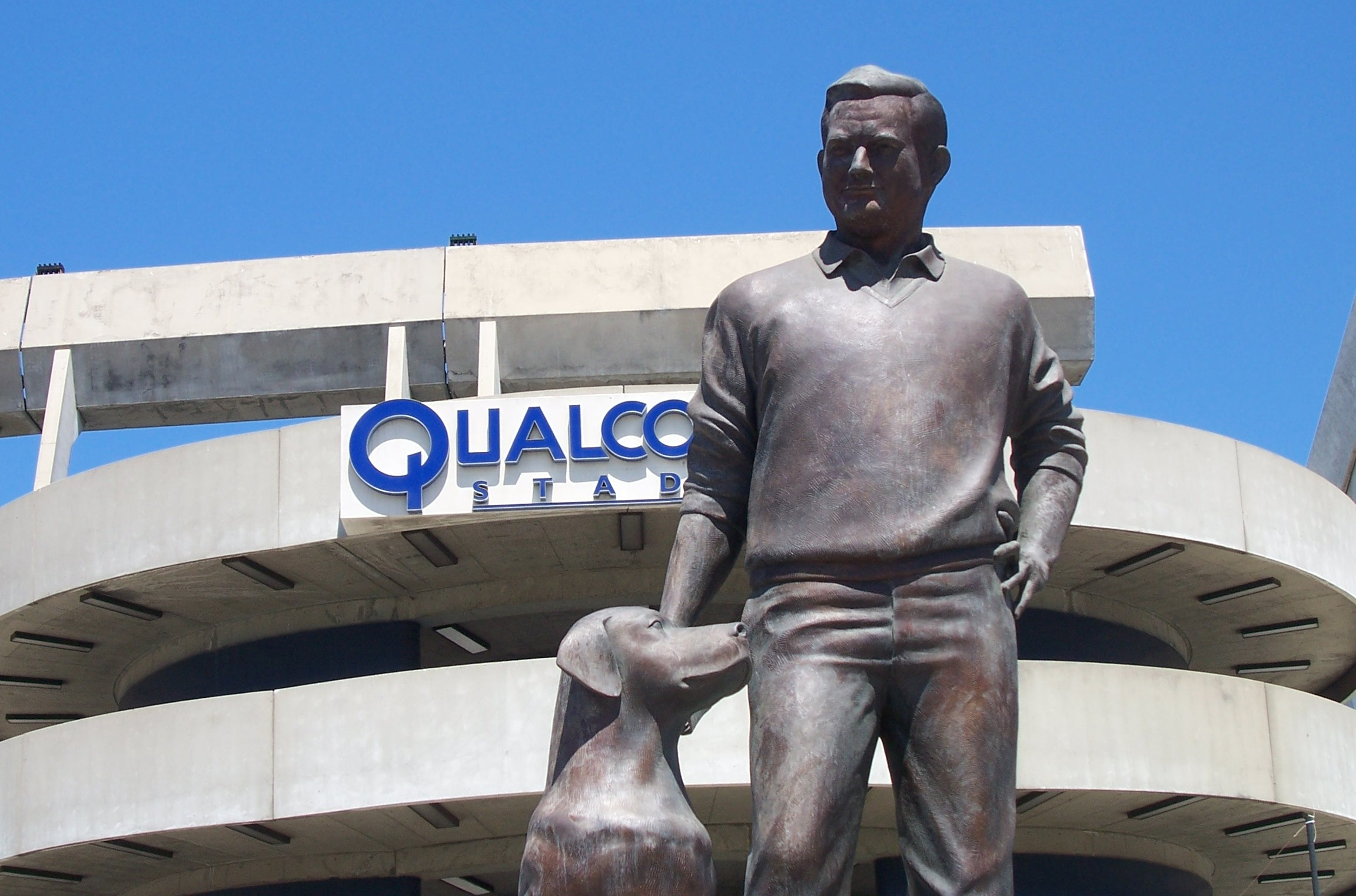
Statue of Jack Murphy and his dog Abe in front of then-Qualcomm Stadium

After the Chargers began to outgrow Balboa Stadium in San Diego, Murphy helped lobby for a San Diego stadium in articles for the San Diego Union. A 50,000-seat stadium was proposed and approved by San Diego voters in 1965.

San Diego Stadium, with 54,000 seats, was renamed San Diego–Jack Murphy Stadium after Murphy died in 1980. It was known as well by "The Murph". The stadium was renamed Qualcomm Stadium in 1997 and Qualcomm retained the naming rights until 2017. It was renamed SDCCU Stadium in 2018 after the San Diego County Credit Union purchased the naming rights. The city named the stadium site Jack Murphy Field.

== Personal life ==
Murphy owned a black Labrador Retriever named Abe and he wrote about him in articles. A statue of Murphy with Abe is in front of Qualcomm Stadium. He was a third cousin of billionaire investor Warren Buffett. Murphy died on September 24, 1980, of lung cancer.

== Awards ==
On May 3, 1988, Murphy was inducted into the National Sportscasters and Sportswriters Hall of Fame.
