= 1966 small college football rankings =

- Selectors: AP, UPI
- No. 1: San Diego State
- Small college football rankings (AP, UPI)
- «1965 1967»

The 1966 small college football rankings are rankings of college football teams representing smaller college and university teams during the 1966 college football season, including the 1966 NCAA College Division football season and the 1966 NAIA football season. Separate rankings were published by the Associated Press (AP) and the United Press International (UPI). The AP rankings were selected by a board of sports writers, and the UPI rankings were selected by a board of small-college coaches.

The 1966 San Diego State Aztecs football team (11–0), led by head coach Don Coryell and defensive coordinator John Madden, was rated as the small-college champion by both the AP and UPI. Tennessee State (9–0) was ranked No. 2 by the AP and No. 3 by the UPI.

== Legend ==
	Increase in ranking
	Decrease in ranking
	Not ranked previous week
(#–#)	Win–loss record
(Italics)	Number of first place votes
т	Tied with team above or below also with this symbol

== AP poll ==
	Week 1 Sept 22	Week 2 Sept 29	Week 3 Oct 6	Week 4 Oct 13	Week 5 Oct 20	Week 6 Oct 27	Week 7 Nov 3	Week 8 Nov 10	Week 9 Nov 17	Week 10 Nov 24	Week 11 Dec 1	
1.	North Dakota State (2)	North Dakota State (5)	North Dakota State (4–0) (7)	North Dakota State (5–0) (10)	North Dakota State (6–0) (8)	North Dakota State (7–0) (11)	North Dakota State (8–0) (10)	San Diego State (7–0) (11)	San Diego State (8–0) (13)	San Diego State (9–0) (11)	San Diego State (10–0) (14)	1.
2.	Southern Illinois	North Dakota (1)	Montana State (4–0) (5)	North Dakota (4–0)	North Dakota (5–0) (2)	San Diego State (5–0) (2)	San Diego State (6–0) (5)	North Dakota State (8–1)	Tennessee State (7–0) (2)	Tennessee State (8–0) (2)	Tennessee State (9–0) (2)	2.
3.	North Dakota	Montana State (3)	North Dakota (3–0)	Middle Tennessee (4–0) (2)	San Diego State (5–0) (2)	Montana State (6–1)	Montana State (7–1) (1)	Montana State (8–1) (1)	Montana State (8–2)	Montana State (8–2)	Montana State (8–2)	3.
4.	Weber State (4)	Sul Ross	Sul Ross (4–0) (1)	San Diego State (4–0) (1)	Chattanooga (4–1)	North Dakota (5–1)	Tennessee State (5–0) (1)	Tennessee State (6–0) (2)	Northwestern State (8–0) (1)	Northwestern State (9–0)	Northwestern State (9–0)	4.
5.	Montana State	San Diego State (1)	Middle Tennessee (3–0) (1)	Sul Ross (3–0) (1)	Sul Ross (4–0) (1)	Arkansas State (5–0) (1)	Northwestern State (6–0)	Northwestern State (7–0) (1)	Weber State (6–2)	Parsons (9–1)	Parsons (9–1)	5.
6.	Sul Ross	Eastern Kentucky (1)	San Diego State (3–0)	Weber State (3–1)	Montana State (5–1)	Tennessee State	Arkansas State (5–1)	Parsons (7–1)	Parsons (8–1)	Arkansas State (7–2)	Arkansas State (7–2)	6.
7.	San Diego State	Ball State (1)	Eastern Kentucky (3–0) (1)	Montana State (4–1)	Weber State (4–1)	Middle Tennessee (5–1)	UMass (5–1)	Arkansas State (6–1) (1)	North Dakota (7–2)	Muskingum (9–0)	Muskingum (9–0)	7.
8.	Southwest Texas State	Wittenberg	Wittenberg (2–0)	Tennessee State (5–0)	Arkansas State (4–0) (1)	Northwestern State (5–0) (1)	Eastern Kentucky (6–1) (1)	Weber State (6–2)	Muskingum (8–0)	North Dakota (7–2)	North Dakota (7–2)	8.
9.	Akron т	Parsons	Weber State (2–1) (1)	Arkansas State (1)	Middle Tennessee (4–1)	Sul Ross (4–0–1) (1)	Weber State (5–2)	North Dakota (6–2)	North Dakota State (7–2)	North Dakota State (8–2)	North Dakota State (8–2)	9.
10.	Florida A&M т	Arkansas State т	Tennessee State (2–0)	Chattanooga (3–1)	Tennessee State (1)	New Mexico Highlands (6–0) (1)	Waynesburg	Muskingum (7–0)	Clarion (9–0)	Weber State (6–3)	Waynesburg (9–0) т	10.
11.		Middle Tennessee (1) т									Weber State (6–3) т	11.
	Week 1 Sept 22	Week 2 Sept 29	Week 3 Oct 6	Week 4 Oct 13	Week 5 Oct 20	Week 6 Oct 27	Week 7 Nov 3	Week 8 Nov 10	Week 9 Nov 17	Week 10 Nov 24	Week 11 Dec 1	
		Dropped: 2 Southern Illinois; 4 Weber State; 8 Southwest Texas State; 9 Akron; 10 Florida A&M	Dropped: 7 Ball State; 9 Parsons; 10 Arkansas State	Dropped: 7 Eastern Kentucky; 8 Wittenberg	None	Dropped: 4 Chattanooga; 7 Weber State	Dropped: 4 North Dakota; 7 Middle Tennessee; 9 Sul Ross; 10 New Mexico Highlands	Dropped: 7 UMass; 8 Eastern Kentucky; 10 Waynesburg	Dropped: 7 Arkansas State	Dropped: 10 Clarion	None	

== UPI coaches poll ==
	Week 1 Sept 21	Week 2 Sept 28	Week 3 Oct 5	Week 4 Oct 12	Week 5 Oct 19	Week 6 Oct 26	Week 7 Nov 2	Week 8 Nov 9	Week 9 Nov 16	Week 10 Nov 23	Week 11 Nov 30	
1.	North Dakota State (2–0) (16)	North Dakota State (3–0) (14)	North Dakota State (4–0) (14)	North Dakota State (5–0) (25)	North Dakota State (6–0) (20)	North Dakota State (7–0) (25)	North Dakota State (8–0) (23)	San Diego State (7–0) (33)	San Diego State (8–0) (32)	San Diego State (9–0) (30)	San Diego State (10–0) (30)	1.
2.	Middle Tennessee (1–0) (2)	North Dakota (2–0) (7)	North Dakota (3–0) (4)	North Dakota (4–0) (3)	San Diego State (5–0) (6)	San Diego State (5–0) (6)	San Diego State (6–0) (7)	Montana State (8–1) (1)	Montana State (8–2) (2)	Montana State (8–2) (4)	Montana State (8–2) (3)	2.
3.	Weber State (1–0) (3)	San Diego State (2–0) (4)	Montana State (4–0) (8)	San Diego State (4–0) (1)	North Dakota (5–0) (4)	Montana State (6–1)	Montana State (7–1) (5)	North Dakota State (8–1) (1)	Weber State (6–2)	Tennessee State (8–0)	Tennessee State (9–0) (1)	3.
4.	UMass (1–0) (1)	Middle Tennessee (2–0) (1)	San Diego State (3–0) (2)	Middle Tennessee (4–0) (2)	Chattanooga (4–1) (1)	North Dakota (5–1)	UMass (5–1)	Weber State (6–2)	Tennessee State (7–0)	North Dakota (7–2)	Northwestern State (9–0)	4.
5.	North Dakota (1–0)	Montana State (3–0)	Middle Tennessee (3–0) (3)	Weber State (3–1) (1)	Weber State (4–1)	UMass (4–1) (1)	Weber State (5–2) т	Arkansas State (6–1)	UMass (6–2)	New Mexico Highlands (8–1)	North Dakota (7–2)	5.
6.	Northern Illinois (1–0)	Long Beach State (1–0) (1)	Sul Ross (3–0)	Sul Ross (3–0)	Montana State (5–1) (1)	Arkansas State (5–0) (1)	Delaware (5–1) т	North Dakota (6–2)	North Dakota (7–2)	Northwestern State (9–0)	New Mexico Highlands (8–1)	6.
7.	St. John's (1–0)	Sul Ross (2–0)	Weber State (2–1)	UMass (2–1)	Sul Ross (4–0)	Middle Tennessee (5–1)	North Dakota (5–2)	Tennessee State (6–0)	New Mexico Highlands (8–1)	Muskingum (9–0)	Muskingum (9–0)	7.
8.	Sul Ross (2–0)	UC Santa Barbara (2–0) (1)	Long Beach State (2–0) (1)	Montana State (4–1)	UMass (3–1)	Sul Ross (4–0–1)	Eastern Kentucky (6–1)	UMass (5–2)	North Dakota State (7–2)	North Dakota State (8–2)	North Dakota State (8–2)	8.
9.	Long Beach State (0–0)	Weber State (1–1)	UMass (1–1)	Chattanooga (3–1) (1)	Arkansas State (4–0) (1)	Chattanooga (4–2)	Arkansas State (5–1)	Middle Tennessee (6–2)	Muskingum (8–0)	Weber State (6–3)	Weber State (6–3)	9.
10.	San Diego State (1–0)	UMass (1–1) (1)	Eastern Kentucky (3–0)	Delaware (3–0) (1)	Middle Tennessee (4–1)	New Mexico Highlands (6–0) (1)	Tennessee State (5–0)	New Mexico Highlands (7–1)	Northwestern State (8–0)	UMass (6–3)	UMass (6–3)	10.
11.	UC Santa Barbara	Ball State	Delaware	Arkansas State	Long Beach State	Weber State	Middle Tennessee	Chattanooga	Chattanooga	Arkansas State	Arkansas State	11.
12.	Pacific (CA)	Arkansas State	Concordia (MN)	Long Beach State	Temple	Temple	Sul Ross т	Long Beach State	Arkansas State	Whitewater State	Whitewater State	12.
13.	Montana State т	Delaware (2)	Chattanooga (1)	Lenoir–Rhyne (1)	New Mexico Highlands (1)	Delaware	Long Beach State т	Muskingum	Gettysburg (1)	Parsons	Parsons	13.
14.	Ball State т	Concordia (MN)	UC Santa Barbara	New Mexico Highlands т	Delaware	Eastern Kentucky	Muskingum	Delaware	Whitewater State	Gettysburg (1)	Central College (IA) т	14.
15.	Linfield	Eastern Kentucky	Lenoir–Rhyne (1)	UC Santa Barbara т	Eastern Kentucky	Luther (1)	Chattanooga	Eastern Kentucky	Parsons	Eastern Kentucky	Waynesburg (1) т	15.
16.	Grambling State	Southwest Texas State	New Mexico Highlands	Temple т	Luther (1)	Tennessee State	New Mexico Highlands	Sul Ross	Central College (IA)	Central College (IA)	Eastern Kentucky	16.
17.	Cal State Los Angeles	Michigan Tech	Arkansas State т	Luther т	Tennessee State	Lenoir–Rhyne	Gettysburg	Gettysburg	Waynesburg	Waynesburg	Gettysburg	17.
18.	Arkansas State (1)	Parsons	Michigan Tech т	Eastern Kentucky	Gettysburg	Muskingum т	Central College (IA)	Northwestern State	Eastern Kentucky	Clarion	Clarion	18.
19.	Florida A&M	Grambling State т	Wittenberg (1)	Baldwin-Wallace (1)	Fort Hays State	Gettysburg т	Lamar Tech	Northeast Louisiana	Northeast Louisiana	Northeast Louisiana	Chattanooga т	19.
20.	Southern Illinois	Northern Illinois т	Abilene Christian	Michigan Tech	Lenoir–Rhyne	Long Beach State	Northeast Louisiana	Parsons	Western State (CO)	Chattanooga	Wittenberg т	20.
	Week 1 Sept 21	Week 2 Sept 28	Week 3 Oct 5	Week 4 Oct 12	Week 5 Oct 19	Week 6 Oct 26	Week 7 Nov 2	Week 8 Nov 9	Week 9 Nov 16	Week 10 Nov 23	Week 11 Nov 30	
		Dropped: 7 St. John's; 12 Pacific (CA); 15 Linfield; 17 Cal State Los Angeles; 19 Florida A&M; 20 Southern Illinois	Dropped: 11 Ball State; 16 Southwest Texas State; 18 Parsons; 19 Grambling State; 20 Northern Illinois	Dropped: 12 Concordia (MN); 19 Wittenberg; 20 Abilene Christian	Dropped: 15 UC Santa Barbara; 19 Baldwin-Wallace; 20 Michigan Tech	Dropped: 19 Fort Hays State	Dropped: 12 Temple; 15 Luther; 17 Lenoir–Rhyne	Dropped: 18 Central College (IA); 19 Lamar Tech	Dropped: 9 Middle Tennessee; 12 Long Beach State; 14 Delaware; 16 Sul Ross	Dropped: 20 Western State (CO)	Dropped: 19 Northeast Louisiana	

== HBCU rankings ==
The New Pittsburgh Courier, a leading African American newspaper, ranked the top 1966 teams from historically black colleges and universities in an era when college football was often racially segregated.

The rankings were published on December 10:

- 1. Tennessee A&I (10–0)
- 2. Morgan State (9–0)
- 3. Southern (6–2–1)
- 4. Grambling (6–2–1)
