= John Smith Field =

Baseball venue in Sacramento, California

- The John
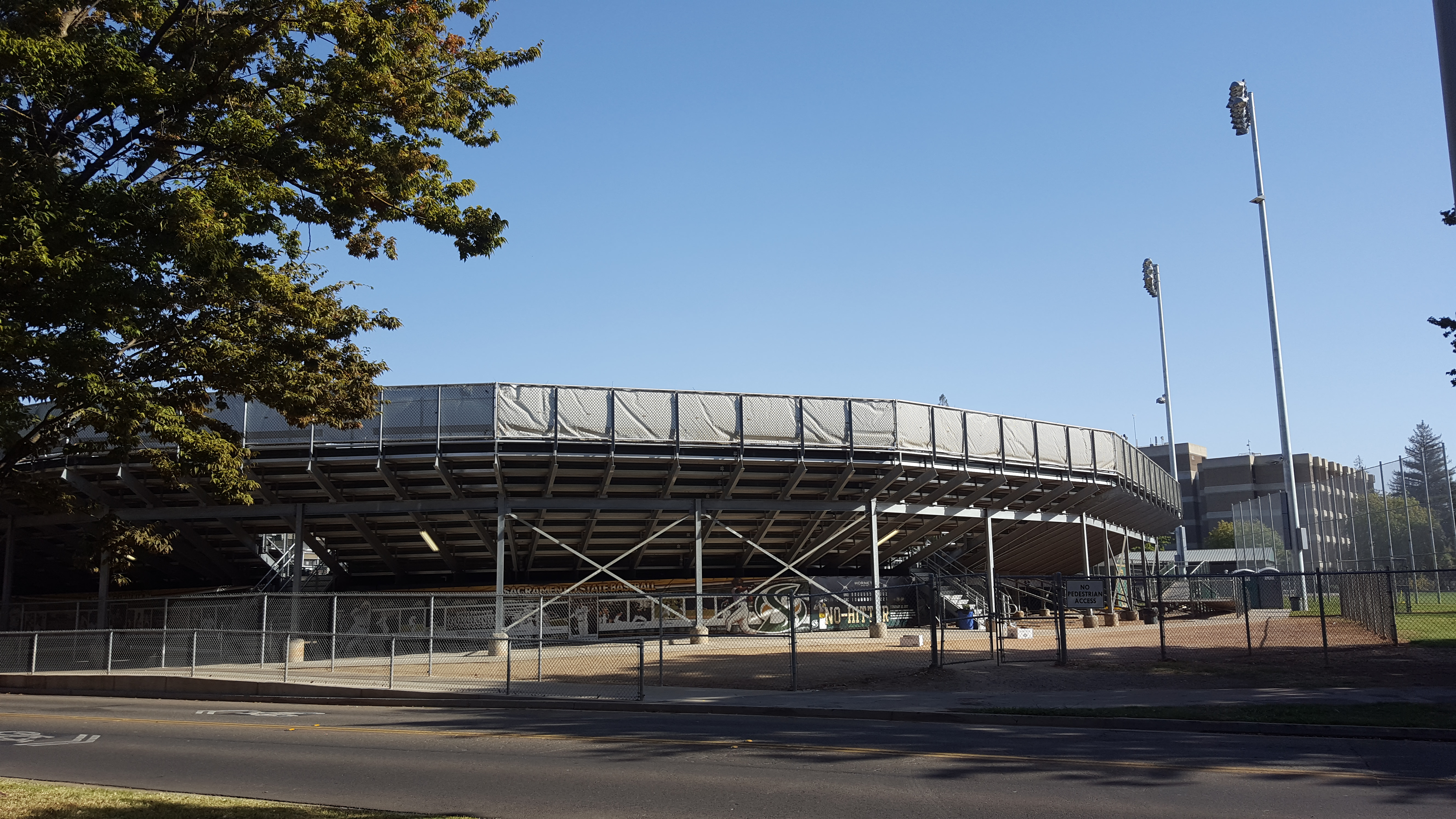
- Exterior view of the stadium in 2017

- Location within California Location within the United States
- Interactive map of John Smith Field
- Former names: Hornet Field (1953–2010)
- Address: Sacramento, CA, USA
- Coordinates: 38.55839°N 121.42640°W
- Owner: Sacramento State University
- Operator: Sacramento State University Athletics
- Capacity: 1,200
- Type: Ballpark
- Surface: Natural grass
- Scoreboard: Electronic
- Current use: Baseball

Construction
- Opened: 1953; 73 years ago
- Renovated: 2002, 2005, 2011
- Expanded: 2002

Tenants
- Sacramento State Hornets baseball Sacramento State Hornets football (1967–1968); William Jessup University (2015)

Website
- hornetsports.com/john-smith-field

John Smith Field, originally known as Hornet Field, is a baseball venue in Sacramento, California. It is home to the Sacramento State Hornets baseball team. Opened in 1953, it has a seating capacity of 1,200 fans. The facility is named for former Sacramento State baseball coach John Smith, who coached the program for 32 seasons. The park was dedicated in 2010, after Smith's retirement following the 2010 season.

== Renovations ==
In 2002, the stadium's seating capacity was expanded with 150 chairback seats and 1,050 bleacher seats. The dugouts, playing surface, and fences were also renovated. In 2005, a new LED scoreboard was installed. In 2007, the players' clubhouse, which includes a lounge, lockers, and offices, was redesigned. 2011 renovations saw adjustments to the dugouts, clubhouse, batting cages, windscreen, and outfield fence. In 2016, lights were installed.

== Baseball events ==
The venue hosted the 1986 and 1987 NCAA Division II West Regionals. The venue hosted a three-game Golden State Athletic Conference series between William Jessup University and Biola University.

== Sacramento State Hornets football ==
Hornet Field was a multi-purpose on-campus field used for football, baseball, and other sports. For the 1967–68 football seasons, the football team split its home games between Hornet Field and Charles C. Hughes Stadium. In 1969, the Sacramento State football team relocated to Hornet Stadium and the old Hornet Field site became primarily dedicated to baseball.

== See also ==
- List of NCAA Division I baseball venues
