= 1966 NAIA football season =

American college football season

- Regular season: August–November 1966
- Postseason: November 26–December 10, 1966
- National Championship: Tulsa, OK
- Champion: Waynesburg

The 1966 NAIA football season was the eleventh season of college football sponsored by the NAIA.

The season was played from August to November 1966, culminating in the 1966 NAIA Championship Bowl, played this year on December 10, 1966 in Tulsa, Oklahoma.

Waynesburg defeated Whitewater State in the Championship Bowl, 42–21, to win their first NAIA national title.

== Conference standings ==
1966 Alabama Collegiate Conference football standings
	Conf.					Overall
Team	W		L		T	W		L		T
Jacksonville State $	3	–	0	–	0	8	–	2	–	0
Florence State	2	–	1	–	0	4	–	4	–	1
Troy State	1	–	2	–	0	5	–	5	–	0
Livingston State	0	–	3	–	0	3	–	6	–	0
$ – Conference champion

1966 Arkansas Intercollegiate Conference football standings
	Conf.					Overall
Team	W		L		T	W		L		T
Arkansas A&M +	4	–	2	–	0	7	–	2	–	0
Ouachita Baptist +	4	–	2	–	0	6	–	4	–	0
Arkansas State Teachers +	4	–	2	–	0	5	–	4	–	0
Harding	3	–	3	–	0	6	–	3	–	0
Southern Arkansas	3	–	3	–	0	5	–	3	–	0
Arkansas Tech	2	–	4	–	0	3	–	6	–	1
Henderson State	1	–	5	–	0	1	–	8	–	0
+ – Conference co-champions

1966 Carolinas Conference football standings
	Conf.					Overall
Team	W		L		T	W		L		T
Lenoir Rhyne +	5	–	2	–	0	6	–	3	–	0
Presbyterian +	5	–	2	–	0	6	–	4	–	0
Guilford	4	–	2	–	1	5	–	4	–	1
Catawba	4	–	3	–	0	5	–	5	–	0
Newberry	3	–	3	–	1	4	–	5	–	1
Western Carolina	3	–	4	–	0	5	–	5	–	0
Appalachian State	2	–	5	–	0	3	–	6	–	1
Elon	1	–	6	–	0	1	–	9	–	0
+ – Conference co-champions

1966 Central Intercollegiate Conference football standings
	Conf.					Overall
Team	W		L		T	W		L		T
No. 15 Fort Hays State +	3	–	1	–	0	7	–	2	–	0
No. 14 Pittsburg State +	3	–	1	–	0	7	–	2	–	0
Emporia State	2	–	2	–	0	3	–	6	–	0
Washburn	1	–	3	–	0	2	–	7	–	0
Omaha	1	–	3	–	0	1	–	9	–	0
$ – Conference champion; Rankings from NAIA poll

1966 College Conference of Illinois football standings
	Conf.					Overall
Team	W		L		T	W		L		T
Augustana (IL) $	5	–	1	–	0	6	–	2	–	1
Carthage	4	–	2	–	0	6	–	2	–	0
North Central (IL)	4	–	2	–	0	6	–	3	–	0
Illinois Wesleyan	4	–	2	–	0	5	–	3	–	0
Carroll (WI)	2	–	4	–	0	5	–	4	–	0
Millikin	2	–	4	–	0	3	–	5	–	0
North Park	0	–	6	–	0	0	–	7	–	1
$ – Conference champion

1966 Eastern Football Conference football standings
	Conf.					Overall
Team	W		L		T	W		L		T
Southern Connecticut State $	4	–	1	–	0	6	–	3	–	0
Bridgeport	3	–	1	–	0	7	–	3	–	0
Central Connecticut State	3	–	2	–	0	7	–	2	–	0
Trenton State	3	–	2	–	0	4	–	4	–	0
Montclair State	1	–	4	–	0	3	–	5	–	0
Glassboro State	0	–	4	–	0	1	–	7	–	1
$ – Conference champion

1966 Evergreen Conference football standings
	Conf.					Overall
Team	W		L		T	W		L		T
No. 19 Eastern Washington $	4	–	1	–	1	7	–	1	–	1
Puget Sound	3	–	3	–	0	5	–	4	–	0
Central Washington	2	–	2	–	2	2	–	5	–	2
Western Washington	2	–	3	–	1	3	–	4	–	2
Whitworth	2	–	4	–	0	2	–	8	–	0
$ – Conference champion; Rankings from NAIA poll

1966 Gateway Conference football standings
	Conf.					Overall
Team	W		L		T	W		L		T
Milton $	3	–	0	–	0	5	–	4	–	0
Northwestern (WI)	2	–	1	–	0	3	–	5	–	0
Lakeland	1	–	2	–	0	3	–	6	–	0
Eureka	0	–	3	–	0	0	–	7	–	0
$ – Conference champion

1966 Gulf States Conference football standings
	Conf.					Overall
Team	W		L		T	W		L		T
No. 4 Northwestern State $	5	–	0	–	0	9	–	0	–	0
Southwestern Louisiana	3	–	2	–	0	6	–	4	–	0
McNeese State	3	–	2	–	0	5	–	5	–	0
Northeast Louisiana State	2	–	3	–	0	7	–	3	–	0
Southeastern Louisiana	1	–	4	–	0	3	–	6	–	0
Louisiana Tech	1	–	4	–	0	1	–	9	–	0
$ – Conference champion; Rankings from NAIA poll

1966 Iowa Conference football standings
	Conf.					Overall
Team	W		L		T	W		L		T
No. 5 Central (IA) $^	7	–	0	–	0	9	–	1	–	0
Luther	6	–	1	–	0	7	–	2	–	0
Upper Iowa	5	–	2	–	0	7	–	3	–	0
Buena Vista	4	–	3	–	0	6	–	3	–	0
Dubuque	3	–	4	–	0	5	–	4	–	0
Simpson (IA)	2	–	5	–	0	3	–	5	–	0
Wartburg	1	–	6	–	0	1	–	8	–	0
William Penn	0	–	7	–	0	0	–	9	–	0
$ – Conference champion; ^ – NAIA playoff participant; Rankings from NAIA poll

1966 Kansas Collegiate Athletic Conference football standings
	Conf.					Overall
Team	W		L		T	W		L		T
No. 18 College of Emporia +	8	–	1	–	0	8	–	1	–	0
No. 11 Ottawa +	8	–	1	–	0	8	–	1	–	0
Southwestern (KS)	7	–	2	–	0	8	–	2	–	0
Baker	5	–	3	–	1	5	–	3	–	1
Friends	5	–	3	–	1	5	–	3	–	1
Bethany (KS)	4	–	5	–	0	4	–	5	–	0
McPherson	3	–	6	–	0	3	–	6	–	0
Kansas Wesleyan	2	–	7	–	0	2	–	7	–	0
Sterling	2	–	7	–	0	2	–	7	–	0
Bethel (KS)	0	–	9	–	0	0	–	9	–	0
+ – Conference co-champions; Rankings from NAIA poll

1966 Lone Star Conference football standings
	Conf.					Overall
Team	W		L		T	W		L		T
East Texas State $	4	–	1	–	2	5	–	3	–	2
Southwest Texas State	4	–	2	–	1	7	–	2	–	1
Sam Houston State	4	–	2	–	1	6	–	3	–	1
Sul Ross	3	–	3	–	1	6	–	3	–	1
Stephen F. Austin	3	–	3	–	1	5	–	3	–	1
Howard Payne	3	–	3	–	1	5	–	5	–	1
Texas A&I	3	–	4	–	0	5	–	5	–	0
McMurry	0	–	6	–	1	1	–	8	–	1
$ – Conference champion

1966 Mid-Ohio Conference football standings
	Conf.					Overall
Team	W		L		T	W		L		T
No. 10 Defiance $	2	–	0	–	0	9	–	0	–	0
Ashland	1	–	0	–	0	5	–	3	–	2
Bluffton	1	–	2	–	0	3	–	4	–	1
Wilmington (OH)	0	–	2	–	0	1	–	7	–	0
$ – Conference champion; Rankings from NAIA poll

1966 Midwest Conference football standings
	Conf.					Overall
Team	W		L		T	W		L		T
Lawrence +	7	–	1	–	0	7	–	1	–	0
Ripon +	7	–	1	–	0	7	–	1	–	0
St. Olaf +	7	–	1	–	0	7	–	1	–	0
Beloit	5	–	3	–	0	5	–	3	–	0
Carleton	3	–	5	–	0	3	–	5	–	0
Coe	3	–	5	–	0	3	–	5	–	0
Cornell (IA)	3	–	5	–	0	3	–	5	–	0
Grinnell	2	–	6	–	0	2	–	6	–	0
Monmouth (IL)	2	–	6	–	0	2	–	6	–	0
Knox	1	–	7	–	0	1	–	7	–	0
+ – Conference co-champions

1966 Minnesota Intercollegiate Athletic Conference football standings
	Conf.					Overall
Team	W		L		T	W		L		T
No. 9 Hamline $	6	–	1	–	0	8	–	1	–	0
Gustavus Adolphus	4	–	1	–	2	5	–	2	–	2
Minnesota–Duluth	4	–	2	–	1	5	–	3	–	1
Concordia (MN)	4	–	3	–	0	5	–	3	–	0
Saint John's (MN)	3	–	3	–	1	4	–	3	–	1
Augsburg	3	–	4	–	0	4	–	4	–	1
St. Thomas (MN)	2	–	5	–	0	2	–	6	–	1
Macalester	0	–	7	–	0	2	–	7	–	0
$ – Conference champion; Rankings from NAIA poll

1966 Missouri College Athletic Union football standings
	Conf.					Overall
Team	W		L		T	W		L		T
Tarkio +	3	–	0	–	0	4	–	5	–	0
William Jewell +	2	–	0	–	0	6	–	3	–	0
Central Methodist	2	–	1	–	0	5	–	3	–	0
Missouri Valley	1	–	1	–	0	6	–	3	–	0
Culver–Stockton	1	–	2	–	0	3	–	6	–	0
Graceland	0	–	5	–	0	1	–	8	–	0
+ – Conference co-champions

1966 Montana Collegiate Conference football standings
	Conf.					Overall
Team	W		L		T	W		L		T
Upper Division
Eastern Montana x$	5	–	0	–	0	6	–	1	–	1
Western Montana	4	–	2	–	0	4	–	5	–	0
Carroll (MT)	3	–	4	–	0	3	–	5	–	0
Lower Division
Northern Montana x	4	–	1	–	0	5	–	2	–	0
Montana Tech	1	–	5	–	0	1	–	5	–	0
Rocky Mountain	1	–	6	–	0	1	–	7	–	0
$ – Conference champion; x – Division champion/co-champions

1966 Nebraska College Conference football standings
	Conf.					Overall
Team	W		L		T	W		L		T
Wayne State (NE) $	4	–	0	–	0	6	–	2	–	0
No. 20 Kearney State	3	–	1	–	0	8	–	2	–	0
Hastings	2	–	2	–	0	3	–	4	–	1
Peru State	1	–	3	–	0	2	–	7	–	0
Chadron State	0	–	4	–	0	0	–	9	–	0
$ – Conference champion; Rankings from NAIA poll

1966 North Dakota College Athletic Conference football standings
	Conf.					Overall
Team	W		L		T	W		L		T
Mayville State +	5	–	1	–	0	6	–	2	–	0
Jamestown +	5	–	1	–	0	5	–	2	–	0
Minot State	4	–	2	–	0	5	–	3	–	0
Valley City State	3	–	3	–	0	5	–	3	–	0
Ellendale	2	–	4	–	0	?	–	?	–	?
Wahpeton Science	2	–	4	–	0	?	–	?	–	?
Dickinson State	0	–	6	–	0	1	–	7	–	0
$ – Conference champion; Dickinson State forfeited a win over Ellendale.

1966 Northern Intercollegiate Conference football standings
	Conf.					Overall
Team	W		L		T	W		L		T
Moorhead State $	4	–	1	–	0	6	–	3	–	0
Mankato State	2	–	2	–	1	3	–	4	–	2
St. Cloud State	2	–	2	–	1	3	–	5	–	1
Michigan Tech	2	–	3	–	0	4	–	3	–	0
Bemidji State	2	–	3	–	0	3	–	5	–	0
Winona State	2	–	3	–	0	2	–	6	–	0
$ – Conference champion

1966 Northwest Conference football standings
	Conf.					Overall
Team	W		L		T	W		L		T
No. 7 Lewis & Clark $	6	–	0	–	0	8	–	1	–	0
Linfield	5	–	1	–	0	7	–	2	–	0
Willamette	4	–	2	–	0	5	–	4	–	0
College of Idaho	2	–	3	–	1	4	–	4	–	1
Pacific Lutheran	1	–	3	–	2	2	–	5	–	2
Pacific (OR)	1	–	4	–	1	3	–	5	–	1
Whitman	0	–	6	–	0	0	–	9	–	0
$ – Conference champion; Rankings from NAIA poll

1966 Oklahoma Collegiate Conference football standings
	Conf.					Overall
Team	W		L		T	W		L		T
East Central $	5	–	1	–	1	7	–	3	–	1
Central State (OK)	5	–	2	–	0	7	–	2	–	0
SW Oklahoma State	5	–	2	–	0	7	–	3	–	0
NW Oklahoma State	4	–	2	–	1	6	–	3	–	1
Langston	4	–	3	–	0	5	–	4	–	0
SE Oklahoma State	2	–	5	–	0	5	–	5	–	0
Northeastern State	2	–	5	–	0	2	–	6	–	1
Panhandle A&M	0	–	7	–	0	1	–	10	–	0
$ – Conference champion

1966 Oregon Collegiate Conference football standings
	Conf.					Overall
Team	W		L		T	W		L		T
Oregon College $	4	–	0	–	0	6	–	2	–	0
Southern Oregon	3	–	1	–	0	4	–	4	–	0
Eastern Oregon	2	–	2	–	0	3	–	5	–	0
Oregon Tech	1	–	3	–	0	1	–	7	–	0
George Fox	0	–	4	–	0	1	–	6	–	0
$ – Conference champion

1966 Pennsylvania State College Athletic Conference football standings
	Conf.					Overall
Team	W		L		T	W		L		T
East Division
West Chester xy	6	–	0	–	0	8	–	3	–	0
East Stroudsburg	4	–	2	–	0	4	–	4	–	0
Cheyney	3	–	3	–	0	4	–	3	–	0
Bloomsburg	3	–	3	–	0	4	–	4	–	0
Mansfield	2	–	4	–	0	4	–	5	–	0
Millersville	2	–	4	–	0	4	–	5	–	0
Kutztown	1	–	5	–	0	1	–	6	–	1
West Division
No. 6 Clarion xy$	5	–	0	–	0	10	–	0	–	0
California (PA)	4	–	1	–	0	4	–	5	–	0
Shippensburg	2	–	3	–	0	4	–	5	–	0
Lock Haven	2	–	3	–	0	2	–	7	–	0
Slippery Rock	1	–	3	–	1	3	–	5	–	1
Edinboro	0	–	4	–	1	1	–	6	–	1
Championship: Clarion 28, West Chester 26
$ – Conference champion; x – Division champion/co-champions; y – Championship game participant; Rankings from NAIA poll

1966 Rocky Mountain Conference football standings
	Conf.					Overall
Team	W		L		T	W		L		T
Western State (CO) $	3	–	0	–	0	6	–	2	–	0
Adams State	2	–	1	–	0	8	–	2	–	0
Colorado Mines	1	–	2	–	0	5	–	5	–	0
Colorado State–Greeley	0	–	3	–	0	3	–	7	–	0
$ – Conference champion

1966 South Dakota Intercollegiate Conference football standings
	Conf.					Overall
Team	W		L		T	W		L		T
Northern State $	5	–	0	–	1	6	–	1	–	2
Southern State (SD)	4	–	2	–	0	6	–	3	–	0
Black Hills State	3	–	2	–	1	5	–	2	–	1
General Beadle	3	–	3	–	0	5	–	4	–	0
South Dakota Tech	2	–	4	–	0	4	–	4	–	0
Dakota Wesleyan	1	–	4	–	1	3	–	5	–	1
Huron	1	–	4	–	1	1	–	7	–	1
$ – Conference champion

1966 Southern California Intercollegiate Athletic Conference football standings
	Conf.					Overall
Team	W		L		T	W		L		T
Redlands $	4	–	1	–	0	7	–	3	–	0
Pomona	3	–	1	–	1	6	–	2	–	1
Whittier	3	–	1	–	1	3	–	5	–	2
Occidental	3	–	2	–	0	5	–	4	–	0
Claremont-Mudd	1	–	4	–	0	1	–	8	–	0
Caltech	0	–	5	–	0	0	–	9	–	0
$ – Conference champion; Caltech forfeited to Whittier.

1966 Southwestern Athletic Conference football standings
	Conf.					Overall
Team	W		L		T	W		L		T
Southern +	5	–	1	–	1	7	–	2	–	1
No. 13 Grambling +	5	–	1	–	1	6	–	2	–	1
Texas Southern	4	–	2	–	1	5	–	4	–	1
Jackson State	3	–	3	–	1	5	–	3	–	1
Prairie View A&M	3	–	3	–	1	5	–	3	–	1
Alcorn A&M	2	–	3	–	2	5	–	3	–	2
Arkansas AM&N	2	–	4	–	1	4	–	5	–	1
Wiley	0	–	7	–	0	0	–	8	–	0
+ – Conference co-champions; Rankings from NAIA poll

1966 Tri-State Conference football standings
	Conf.					Overall
Team	W		L		T	W		L		T
Yankton +	5	–	1	–	0	8	–	1	–	0
Westmar +	5	–	1	–	0	7	–	2	–	0
Sioux Falls	4	–	2	–	0	6	–	3	–	0
Dana	2	–	4	–	0	3	–	5	–	0
Concordia (NE)	2	–	4	–	0	2	–	5	–	2
Midland	2	–	4	–	0	2	–	6	–	0
Northwestern (IA)	1	–	5	–	0	2	–	6	–	0
+ – Conference co-champions

1966 West Penn Conference football standings
	Conf.					Overall
Team	W		L		T	W		L		T
No. 1 Waynesburg $^	2	–	0	–	0	11	–	0	–	0
Grove City	1	–	0	–	1	8	–	0	–	1
Westminster (PA)	1	–	1	–	1	6	–	2	–	1
Geneva	0	–	3	–	0	0	–	8	–	0
$ – Conference champion; ^ – NAIA playoff participant; Rankings from NAIA poll

1966 West Virginia Intercollegiate Athletic Conference football standings
	Conf.					Overall
Team	W		L		T	W		L		T
No. 8 Concord $	6	–	0	–	0	9	–	1	–	0
No. 16 Fairmont State	6	–	1	–	0	7	–	1	–	0
West Virginia Wesleyan	3	–	1	–	0	5	–	4	–	0
Bluefield State	2	–	1	–	2	4	–	1	–	2
West Liberty State	3	–	2	–	1	5	–	2	–	1
Salem	2	–	3	–	1	2	–	5	–	1
West Virginia Tech	3	–	5	–	0	3	–	5	–	0
Glenville State	2	–	5	–	0	2	–	6	–	0
West Virginia State	1	–	6	–	0	2	–	7	–	0
Shepherd	0	–	4	–	0	1	–	8	–	0
$ – Conference champion; Conference standings based on power ratings; Rankings from NAIA poll

1966 Wisconsin State University Conference football standings
	Conf.					Overall
Team	W		L		T	W		L		T
No. 2 Whitewater State $^	8	–	0	–	0	10	–	1	–	0
River Falls State	6	–	1	–	1	6	–	2	–	1
Stevens Point State	6	–	2	–	0	6	–	3	–	0
La Crosse State	5	–	3	–	0	6	–	3	–	0
Platteville State	3	–	4	–	1	4	–	4	–	1
Oshkosh State	3	–	5	–	0	3	–	6	–	0
Stout State	2	–	6	–	0	3	–	6	–	0
Eau Claire State	1	–	7	–	0	1	–	7	–	1
Superior State	1	–	7	–	0	1	–	8	–	0
$ – Conference champion; ^ – NAIA playoff participant; Rankings from NAIA poll

1966 NAIA independents football records
	Conf.			Overall
Team	W	L	T	W		L		T
No. 12 Doane		–		7	–	0	–	1
Cal Lutheran		–		8	–	2	–	0
Emory and Henry		–		8	–	2	–	0
No. 3 New Mexico Highlands ^		–		8	–	2	–	0
Carson–Newman		–		7	–	3	–	1
Austin		–		6	–	3	–	0
Wofford		–		6	–	3	–	1
Georgetown (KY)		–		6	–	4	–	0
Azusa Pacific		–		5	–	4	–	0
Simon Fraser		–		5	–	3	–	0
Westminster (UT)		–		4	–	4	–	0
Hillsdale		–		3	–	5	–	1
Iowa Wesleyan		–		3	–	5	–	0
Findlay		–		3	–	6	–	0
La Verne		–		3	–	6	–	0
Earlham		–		2	–	5	–	1
Southern Colorado State		–		3	–	7	–	0
Eastern New Mexico		–		2	–	7	–	0
St. Mary of the Plains		–		2	–	7	–	0
Oklahoma Panhandle State		–		1	–	10	–	0
Rankings from NAIA poll

== Postseason ==
=== Bracket ===
Semifinals; November 26, 1966
Waynesburg	30
New Mexico Highlands*	27
Central (IA)	18
Whitewater State*	41

Championship; December 10, 1966; Tulsa, OK
Waynesburg	42
Whitewater State	21

=== Championship game outstanding players ===
- Back: Rich Dahar, Waynesburg
- Lineman: Dennis Williamson, Whitewater State

== See also ==
- 1966 NCAA University Division football season
- 1966 NCAA College Division football season
