= 1966 Tennessee A&I Tigers football team =

American college football season

1966 Tennessee A&I Tigers football

Black college national champion Midwestern Conference champion

Grantland Rice Bowl, W 34–7 vs. Muskingum
- Conference: Midwestern Conference
- Record: 10–0 (2–0 Midwestern)
- Head coach: John Merritt (4th season)
- Home stadium: Hale Stadium

1966 Midwestern Conference football standings
	Conf.					Overall
Team	W		L		T	W		L		T
No. 1 Tennessee A&I $	2	–	0	–	0	10	–	0	–	0
Lincoln (MO)	1	–	1	–	0	7	–	2	–	0
Kentucky State	0	–	2	–	0	3	–	4	–	1
$ – Conference champion; Rankings from New Pittsburgh Courier

The 1966 Tennessee A&I Tigers football team was an American football team that represented Tennessee Agricultural & Industrial State College as a member of the Midwestern Conference during the 1966 NCAA College Division football season. In their fourth season under head coach John Merritt, the Tigers compiled a perfect 10–0 record, won the Midwestern Conference championship, shut out five of ten opponents, defeated Muskingum in the 1966 Grantland Rice Bowl, and outscored all opponents by a total of 410 to 51. The Tigers compiled a 24-game unbeaten streak that encompassed the 1965 and 1966 seasons.

The team was also recognized as the 1966 black college national champion and was ranked No. 2 in the final small college rankings issued by the Associated Press and No. 3 in the final poll issued by the United Press International. The team's No. 2 ranking was the highest achieved by a black college team to that point in time. The Pittsburgh Courier called the 1966 Tennessee A&I team as "the finest force yet produced by Negro college football."

On October 22, the Tigers became the first team to defeat the Florida A&M Rattlers in Bragg Memorial Stadium and the first team to shut out the Rattlers in 16 years.

Three Tennessee A&I players were selected as first team players on the Pittsburgh Courier's 1966 All-America team: quarterback Eldridge Dickey, fullback Bill Tucker, and defensive tackle Claude Humphrey. Other key players included halfback Noland Smith and split end Johnnie Robinson.

== Schedule ==
Date	Opponent	Rank	Site	Result	Attendance	Source
September 24	at North Carolina A&T*		World War Memorial Stadium; Greensboro, NC	W 55–0		
October 1	Texas Southern*		Hale Stadium; Nashville, TN	W 52–0	7,720	
October 8	at Grambling*	No. 10	Grambling Stadium; Grambling, LA	W 31–23		
October 22	at Florida A&M*	No. 10	Bragg Memorial Stadium; Tallahassee, FL	W 29–0		
October 29	Southern*	No. 6	Hale Stadium; Nashville, TN	W 31–9		
November 5	Morris Brown*	No. 4	Hale Stadium; Nashville, TN	W 28–0	2,260	
November 12	vs. Lincoln (MO)	No. 4	Busch Memorial Stadium; St. Louis, MO (Gateway Classic)	W 28–6	3,000	
November 19	at Allen*	No. 2	Columbia, SC	W 39–6		
November 24	Kentucky State^{†}	No. 2	Hale Stadium; Nashville, TN	W 83–0	11,000	
December 10	vs. No. 7 Muskingum*	No. 2	Horace Jones Field; Murfreesboro, TN (Grantland Rice Bowl)	W 34–7	< 7,000	
*Non-conference game; ^{†}Homecoming; Rankings from AP Poll released prior to the game
