= 1966 college football season =

1966 college football season may refer to:

- 1966 NCAA University Division football season
- 1966 NCAA College Division football season
- 1966 NAIA football season
