= 1966 Sam Houston State Bearkats football team =

American college football season

1966 Sam Houston State Bearkats football
- Conference: Lone Star Conference
- Record: 6–3–1 (4–2–1 LSC)
- Head coach: Paul Pierce (15th season)
- Home stadium: Pritchett Field

1966 Lone Star Conference football standings
| | Conf. | | | | | Overall |
| Team | W | | L | | T | W | | L | | T |
|---|---|---|---|---|---|---|---|---|---|---|
| East Texas State $ | 4 | – | 1 | – | 2 | 5 | – | 3 | – | 2 |
| Southwest Texas State | 4 | – | 2 | – | 1 | 7 | – | 2 | – | 1 |
| Sam Houston State | 4 | – | 2 | – | 1 | 6 | – | 3 | – | 1 |
| Sul Ross | 3 | – | 3 | – | 1 | 6 | – | 3 | – | 1 |
| Stephen F. Austin | 3 | – | 3 | – | 1 | 5 | – | 3 | – | 1 |
| Howard Payne | 3 | – | 3 | – | 1 | 5 | – | 5 | – | 1 |
| Texas A&I | 3 | – | 4 | – | 0 | 5 | – | 5 | – | 0 |
| McMurry | 0 | – | 6 | – | 1 | 1 | – | 8 | – | 1 |
$ – Conference champion

The 1966 Sam Houston State Bearkats football team represented Sam Houston State College (now known as Sam Houston State University) as a member of the Lone Star Conference (LSC) during the 1966 NAIA football season. Led by 15th-year head coach Paul Pierce, the Bearkats compiled an overall record of 6–3–1 with a mark of 4–2–1 in conference play, and finished tied for second in the LSC.

== Schedule ==
| Date | Opponent | Site | Result | Source |
|---|---|---|---|---|
| September 17 | Northwestern State (OK)* | Pritchett Field; Huntsville, TX | W 32–6 | |
| September 24 | Mexico Polytechnic* | Pritchett Field; Huntsville, TX | W 42–0 | |
| October 1 | Tarleton State* | Pritchett Field; Huntsville, TX | L 13–19 | |
| October 8 | at Howard Payne | Brownwood, TX | T 0–0 | |
| October 15 | at McMurry | Shotwell Stadium; Abilene, TX | W 10–3 | |
| October 22 | Southwest Texas State | Pritchett Field; Huntsville, TX | W 27–16 | |
| October 29 | at Stephen F. Austin | Memorial Stadium; Nacogdoches, TX (rivalry) | L 14–21 | |
| November 5 | East Texas State | Pritchett Field; Huntsville, TX | L 13–17 | |
| November 12 | at Texas A&I | Javelina Stadium; Kingsville, TX | W 10–0 | |
| November 19 | Sul Ross | Pritchett Field; Huntsville, TX | W 21–14 | |
*Non-conference game
