= 1966 Florida A&M Rattlers football team =

American college football season

1966 Florida A&M Rattlers football

Orange Blossom Classic, W 43–26 vs. Alabama A&M
- Conference: Southern Intercollegiate Athletic Conference
- Division I
- Record: 7–3 (4–1 SIAC)
- Head coach: Jake Gaither (22nd season)
- Home stadium: Bragg Memorial Stadium

The 1966 Florida A&M Rattlers football team represented Florida A&M University as a member of Division I of the Southern Intercollegiate Athletic Conference (SIAC) during the 1966 NCAA College Division football season. Led by 22nd-year head coach Jake Gaither, the Rattlers finished the season overall record of 7–3 and a mark of 4–1 in conference play. Florida A&M was defeated by Grambling in the Orange Blossom Classic.

== Schedule ==
Date	Opponent	Site	Result	Attendance	Source
September 17	Allen	Bragg Memorial Stadium; Tallahassee, FL	W 43–3		
September 24	at South Carolina State	State College Stadium; Orangeburg, SC	L 3–8		
October 8	Benedict	Bragg Memorial Stadium; Tallahassee, FL	W 56–12		
October 15	at Morris Brown	Herndon Stadium; Atlanta, GA	W 22–15		
October 22	No. 10 Tennessee A&I*	Bragg Memorial Stadium; Tallahassee, FL	L 0–29		
November 5	North Carolina A&T*	Bragg Memorial Stadium; Tallahassee, FL	W 64–18	13,500	
November 12	at Southern*	University Stadium; Baton Rouge, LA	L 13–17		
November 19	at Bethune–Cookman	Welch Stadium; Daytona Beach, FL (Florida Classic)	W 37–13	10,000	
November 26	vs. Texas Southern*	Gator Bowl Stadium; Jacksonville, FL	W 41–12		
December 3	vs. Alabama A&M*	Miami Orange Bowl; Miami, FL (Orange Blossom Classic)	W 43–26	28,815	
*Non-conference game; Rankings from AP Poll released prior to the game; Source:
