= 1966 Southwest Texas State Bobcats football team =

American college football season

1966 Southwest Texas State Bobcats football
- Conference: Lone Star Conference
- Record: 7–2–1 (4–2–1 LSC)
- Head coach: Bill Miller (2nd season)
- Home stadium: Evans Field

1966 Lone Star Conference football standings
	Conf.					Overall
Team	W		L		T	W		L		T
East Texas State $	4	–	1	–	2	5	–	3	–	2
Southwest Texas State	4	–	2	–	1	7	–	2	–	1
Sam Houston State	4	–	2	–	1	6	–	3	–	1
Sul Ross	3	–	3	–	1	6	–	3	–	1
Stephen F. Austin	3	–	3	–	1	5	–	3	–	1
Howard Payne	3	–	3	–	1	5	–	5	–	1
Texas A&I	3	–	4	–	0	5	–	5	–	0
McMurry	0	–	6	–	1	1	–	8	–	1
$ – Conference champion

The 1966 Southwest Texas State Bobcats football team was an American football team that represented Southwest Texas State College (now known as Texas State University) during the 1966 NAIA football season as a member of the Lone Star Conference (LSC). In their second year under head coach Bill Miller, the team compiled an overall record of 7–2–1 with a mark of 4–2–1 in conference play.

== Schedule ==
Date	Opponent	Site	Result	Attendance	Source
September 17	Texas Lutheran*	Evans Field; San Marcos, TX	W 34–3		
September 24	at Trinity (TX)*	Alamo Stadium; San Antonio, TX	W 16–0	7,706	
October 1	at Sul Ross	Jackson Field; Alpine, TX	L 13–16		
October 8	Angelo State*	Evans Field; San Marcos, TX	W 24–6		
October 15	Howard Payne	Evans Field; San Marcos, TX	W 18–17		
October 22	at Sam Houston State	Pritchett Field; Huntsville, TX (rivalry)	L 16–27		
October 29	at McMurry	Shotwell Stadium; Abilene, TX	W 17–0		
November 5	Stephen F. Austin	Evans Field; San Marcos, TX	W 20–7		
November 12	at East Texas State	Memorial Stadium; Commerce, TX	T 14–14		
November 19	Texas A&I	Evans Field; San Marcos, TX	W 9–3		
*Non-conference game
