= 1966 Grantland Rice Bowl =

Tennessee A&I Tigers	Muskingum Fighting Muskies
(9–0)	(9–0)
Midwestern Conference	Ohio Athletic Conference
34	7
Head coach: John Merritt	Head coach: Ed Sherman
	1	2	3	4	Total
Tennessee A&I	7	13	7	7	34
Muskingum	0	0	7	0	7
- Date: December 10, 1966
- Season: 1966
- Stadium: Horace Jones Field
- Location: Murfreesboro, Tennessee
- Attendance: 6,500

The 1966 Grantland Rice Bowl was an NCAA College Division game following the 1966 season, between the Tennessee A&I Tigers and the Muskingum Fighting Muskies. Tennessee State quarterback Eldridge Dickey was named the game's most valuable player.

== Notable participants ==
Multiple players from Tennessee A&I were selected in the 1967 NFL/AFL draft – running back Bill Tucker, defensive back Alvin Coleman, return specialist Noland Smith, defensive back Leon Moore, running back Eugens Bowens, and defensive back Howard Finley. Additional Tennessee A&I players were selected in the 1968 NFL/AFL draft – defensive end Claude Humphrey, quarterback Eldridge Dickey, wide receiver John Robinson, wide receiver Leo Johnson, and guard Tommy Davis. Humphrey was inducted to the Pro Football Hall of Fame in 2014. Running back Cid Edwards was not drafted, but later played in the NFL. Muskingum running back Rick Harbold was inducted to his university's hall of fame in 1985.

Both head coaches have been inducted to the College Football Hall of Fame – John Merritt of Tennessee A&I in 1994, and Ed Sherman of Muskingum in 1996.

== Scoring summary ==
Scoring summary

Quarter	Time	Drive			Team	Scoring information	Score	
Quarter	Time	Plays	Yards	TOP	Team	Scoring information	Tenn. A&I	Musk.
1					Tenn. A&I	Nolan Smith 46-yard touchdown reception from Eldridge Dickey, Roy Meneese kick good	7	0
2		2	4		Tenn. A&I	Eldridge Dickey 1-yard touchdown run, Roy Meneese kick good	14	0
2			18		Tenn. A&I	Eldridge Dickey 1-yard touchdown run, 2-point pass failed	20	0
3		8	44		Musk.	Rick Harbold 2-yard touchdown run, Albury kick good	20	7
3					Tenn. A&I	John Robinson 79-yard touchdown reception from Eldridge Dickey†, Roy Meneese kick good	27	7
4		7	69		Tenn. A&I	John Robinson 14-yard touchdown reception from Eldridge Dickey, Roy Meneese kick good	34	7
"TOP" = time of possession. For other American football terms, see Glossary of American football.							34	7

†Play set a TSU record for longest touchdown reception.
