= 1966 Texas Southern Tigers football team =

American college football season

1966 Texas Southern Tigers football
- Conference: Southwestern Athletic Conference
- Record: 5–4–1 (4–2–1 SWAC)
- Head coach: Clifford Paul (2nd season)
- Home stadium: Jeppesen Stadium

1966 Southwestern Athletic Conference football standings
	Conf.					Overall
Team	W		L		T	W		L		T
Southern +	5	–	1	–	1	7	–	2	–	1
No. 13 Grambling +	5	–	1	–	1	6	–	2	–	1
Texas Southern	4	–	2	–	1	5	–	4	–	1
Jackson State	3	–	3	–	1	5	–	3	–	1
Prairie View A&M	3	–	3	–	1	5	–	3	–	1
Alcorn A&M	2	–	3	–	2	5	–	3	–	2
Arkansas AM&N	2	–	4	–	1	4	–	5	–	1
Wiley	0	–	7	–	0	0	–	8	–	0
+ – Conference co-champions; Rankings from NAIA poll

The 1966 Texas Southern Tigers football team was an American football team that represented Texas Southern University as a member of the Southwestern Athletic Conference (SWAC) during the 1966 NAIA football season. Led by second-year head coach Clifford Paul, the Tigers compiled an overall record of 5–4–1 with a mark of 4–2–1 in conference play, placing third in SWAC.

== Schedule ==
Date	Opponent	Site	Result	Attendance	Source
September 17	Southern	Jeppesen Stadium; Houston, TX	W 20–14		
September 24	vs. Wiley	Public School Stadium; Galveston, TX	W 64–6		
October 1	at Tennessee A&I*	Hale Stadium; Nashville, TN	L 0–52	7,720	
October 8	Mississippi Valley State*	Jeppesen Stadium; Houston, TX	W 32–8		
October 15	at Alcorn A&M	Henderson Stadium; Lorman, MS	W 16–7	3,500	
October 29	Grambling	Jeppesen Stadium; Houston, TX	L 17–19		
November 5	at Jackson State	Alumni Field; Jackson, MS	W 28–14		
November 12	at Arkansas AM&N	Pumphrey Stadium; Pine Bluff, AR	T 15–15		
November 19	Prairie View A&M	Jeppesen Stadium; Houston, TX (rivalry)	L 18–31	16,500	
November 26	vs. Florida A&M*	Gator Bowl Stadium; Jacksonville, FL	L 12–41		
*Non-conference game
