= John Merritt (American football) =

American football player and coach (1926–1983)

- c. 1970

Biographical details
- Born: January 26, 1926; Falmouth, Kentucky, U.S.
- Died: December 15, 1983 (aged 57); Nashville, Tennessee, U.S.

Playing career
- 1947–1949: Kentucky State
- Position: Guard

Coaching career (HC unless noted)
- 1952–1962: Jackson / Jackson State
- 1963–1983: Tennessee A&I/State

Head coaching record
- Overall: 235–70–12
- Bowls: 5–2
- Tournaments: 1–2 (NCAA D-I-AA playoffs)

Accomplishments and honors

Championships
- 8 black college national (1962, 1965–1966, 1970–1971, 1973, 1979, 1982); 5 MWAA/Midwestern/Midwest (1957, 1963–1966); 2 SWAC (1961–1962)

Awards
- Amos Alonzo Stagg Award (1995)
- College Football Hall of Fame; Inducted in 1994 (profile)

John Ayers Merritt (January 26, 1926 – December 15, 1983) was an American college football coach. He served as the head football coach at Jackson State University from 1952 to 1962 and Tennessee State University from 1963 to 1983, compiling a career coaching record of 235–70–12. Merritt was inducted into the College Football Hall of Fame in 1994.

Merritt was born in Falmouth, Kentucky, and is an alumnus of Kentucky State University, where he played guard on the football team from 1947 to 1949. He earned the nickname "Big John". He graduated in 1950 and earned a master's degree from the University of Kentucky in 1952.

He coached Jackson State University from 1953 to 1962, where he compiled a record of 63–37–5. Merritt led Jackson State to back-to-back appearances in the Orange Blossom Classic in 1961 and 1962 before being hired by what was then Tennessee A&I. At Tennessee State (as Tennessee A&I was renamed in 1968), Merritt had four undefeated seasons, claimed four Midwest Athletic Association titles, seven black college football national championships: (1965, 1966, 1970, 1971, 1973, 1979 and 1982) and earned the school's first-ever NCAA Division I-AA playoff victory in 1982.

Merritt coached many players who went on to the National Football League (NFL), including Ed "Too Tall" Jones, Joe Gilliam, Claude Humphrey, Mike Hegman, and Richard Dent. His coaching record at Tennessee State was 172–33–7 with an .828 winning percentage—far and away the best in program history. He had the opportunity to become the first black head coach of a major college football in 1973 when he was offered the head coaching job at Wichita State, but chose to remain at Tennessee State out of loyalty to his players and assistants.

== Death and honors ==
Merritt died on December 15, 1983, at Vanderbilt University Hospital in Nashville, Tennessee, after suffering from heart disease.

John Merritt Boulevard in Nashville, Tennessee and the John Ayers Merritt Memorial Bridge in his hometown of Falmouth, Kentucky are named in his honor. The Tennessee State football team usually opens every home season with the John Merritt Classic game at Nissan Stadium, traditionally against Alabama A&M University, but more recently the game has also headlined other from other universities.

== Head coaching record ==
Year	Team	Overall	Conference	Standing	Bowl/playoffs
Jackson / Jackson State Tigers (Midwest Athletic Association) (1952–1957)
1952	Jackson	3–5–1	0–2–1	6th	
1953	Jackson	5–4	0–3	T–6th	
1954	Jackson	1–7–1	0–4	7th	
1955	Jackson	5–4	0–3	T–5th	
1956	Jackson State	6–2–2	1–1	T–2nd	
1957	Jackson State	6–2	2–0	T–1st	
1958	Jackson State	6–2–1	2–0	2nd	
Jackson State Tigers (Southwestern Athletic Conference) (1959–1962)
1959	Jackson State	6–4	4–3	4th	
1960	Jackson State	6–4	4–3	4th	
1961	Jackson State	9–2	6–1	1st	L Orange Blossom Classic
1962	Jackson State	10–1	6–1	1st	W Orange Blossom Classic
Jackson / Jackson State:		63–37–5	25–21–1		
Tennessee A&I Tigers (Midwest Conference / Midwestern Conference) (1963–1966)
1963	Tennessee A&I	6–3	3–0	1st	
1964	Tennessee A&I	8–2	3–0	1st	
1965	Tennessee A&I	9–0–1	3–0	1st	T Grantland Rice
1966	Tennessee A&I	10–0	2–0	1st	W Grantland Rice
Tennessee A&I / State Tigers (NCAA College Division / Division II independent) (1967–1976)
1967	Tennessee A&I	6–3			
1968	Tennessee State	6–2–1			
1969	Tennessee State	7–1–1			
1970	Tennessee State	11–0			W Grantland Rice
1971	Tennessee State	9–1			W Grantland Rice
1972	Tennessee State	11–1			W Pioneer
1973	Tennessee State	10–0			
1974	Tennessee State	8–2			
1975	Tennessee State	5–4			
1976	Tennessee State	7–2–1			
Tennessee State Tigers (NCAA Division I/I-A independent) (1977–1980)
1977	Tennessee State	8–1–1			
1978	Tennessee State	8–3			
1979	Tennessee State	8–3			
1980	Tennessee State	9–1			
Tennessee State Tigers (NCAA Division I-AA independent) (1981–1983)
1981	Tennessee State	9–2			L NCAA Division I-AA Quarterfinal
1982	Tennessee State	10–1–1			L NCAA Division I-AA Semifinal
1983	Tennessee State	8–2–1			
Tennessee A&I / State:		172–33–7	11–0–1		
Total:		235–70–12			
National championship Conference title Conference division title or championship game berth

== See also ==
- List of college football career coaching wins leaders
