= 1966 East Texas State Lions football team =

American college football season

1966 East Texas State Lions football

LSC champion
- Conference: Lone Star Conference
- Record: 5–3–2 (4–1–2 LSC)
- Head coach: Ernest Hawkins (3rd season)
- Home stadium: Memorial Stadium

1966 Lone Star Conference football standings
	Conf.					Overall
Team	W		L		T	W		L		T
East Texas State $	4	–	1	–	2	5	–	3	–	2
Southwest Texas State	4	–	2	–	1	7	–	2	–	1
Sam Houston State	4	–	2	–	1	6	–	3	–	1
Sul Ross	3	–	3	–	1	6	–	3	–	1
Stephen F. Austin	3	–	3	–	1	5	–	3	–	1
Howard Payne	3	–	3	–	1	5	–	5	–	1
Texas A&I	3	–	4	–	0	5	–	5	–	0
McMurry	0	–	6	–	1	1	–	8	–	1
$ – Conference champion

The 1966 East Texas State Lions football team represented East Texas State University in the 1966 NAIA football season. They were led by head coach Ernest Hawkins, who was in his third season at East Texas State. The Lions played their home games at Memorial Stadium and were members of the Lone Star Conference. With a 5–3–2 record, the Lions won the Lone Star Conference championship, the first of four under Hawkins. Tailback Curtis Guyton was named All-American, the first black player in program history to be named All-American.

== Schedule ==
Date	Time	Opponent	Site	Result	Attendance	Source
September 17	2:00 p.m.	at Abilene Christian*	Shotwell Stadium; Abilene, TX	L 0–7	6,500	
September 24	2:00 p.m.	Texas Lutheran*	Memorial Stadium; Commerce, TX	W 42–0		
October 1	6:00 p.m.	at Arlington State*	Memorial Stadium; Arlington, TX	L 10–27		
October 8	6:00 p.m.	McMurry	Memorial Stadium; Commerce, TX	W 17–11		
October 15	2:00 p.m.	at Texas A&I	Memorial Stadium; Commerce, TX	W 25–24		
October 22	2:00 p.m.	at Sul Ross	Jackson Field; Alpine, TX	T 14–14		
October 29	2:00 p.m.	Howard Payne	Memorial Stadium; Commerce, TX	W 10–7		
November 4	6:00 p.m.	at Sam Houston State	Pritchett Field; Huntsville, TX	W 17–13		
November 12	2:00 p.m.	Southwest Texas State	Memorial Stadium; Commerce, TX	T 14–14		
November 19	2:00 p.m.	at Stephen F. Austin	Memorial Stadium; Nacogdoches, TX	L 7–24		
*Non-conference game; All times are in Central time

== Postseason awards ==
=== All-Americans ===
- Curtis Guyton, halfback, Third Team

=== Lone Star Conference superlatives ===
- Coach of The Year: Ernest Hawkins

=== All-Lone Star Conference ===
==== LSC First Team ====
- Curtis Guyton, halfback

==== LSC Second Team ====
- Charles Froneberger, center
- Bill Garner, defensive end
- David McKay, safety
- Mike Venable, linebacker
- Sam Walton, offensive tackle
- Ronald Zwernemann, offensive tackle

==== LSC Honorable Mention ====
- Tommy Briscoe, offensive guard
- Leo Rhodes, offensive guard
- Tim Smith, defensive tackle
