= Eldridge Dickey =

American football player (1945–2000)

No. 10
- Positions: Quarterback, Wide receiver

Personal information
- Born: December 24, 1945; Houston, Texas, U.S.
- Died: May 22, 2000 (aged 54)
- Listed height: 6 ft 2 in (1.88 m)
- Listed weight: 198 lb (90 kg)

Career information
- High school: Booker T. Washington (Houston)
- College: Tennessee State
- NFL draft: 1968: 1st round, 25th overall pick

Career history
- Oakland Raiders (1968–1971)

Awards and highlights
- AFL champion (1968)

Career NFL/AFL statistics
- Receptions: 5
- Receiving yards: 112
- Touchdowns: 1
- Stats at Pro Football Reference

Eldridge Reno Dickey (December 24, 1945 – May 22, 2000) was an American professional football player. After playing for Tennessee State University from 1965 to 1968, he was selected by the Oakland Raiders in the first round of the 1968 NFL/AFL draft. Dickey became the first African American quarterback selected in the first round by an American Football League (AFL) or National Football League (NFL) team. Despite a strong performance during training camp, Dickey was moved to wide receiver for the start of the season. He never played at quarterback in an AFL or NFL game.

== Early life and college ==
Dickey began playing football at Richard G. Lockett Jr. High School and went on to play at Booker T. Washington High School, both in his hometown of Houston, Texas. Dickey had an IQ measured in the high 130s.

In college at Tennessee State (TSU), he became a three-time HBCU All-American with 6,523 passing yards and 67 touchdowns. Dickey was considered a gifted athlete with his strongest positions being quarterback and punter. He was also able to throw precision passes with both his left and right arm. With Dickey at the lead, TSU played in the Grantland Rice Bowl in 1965 and 1966; Dickey was named the MVP of the 1966 game. Also in 1966, TSU earned their first undefeated, untied season and their first National Black College Football Championship. The 1966 team averaged 41 points per game, allowing an average of only 4.

== Professional career ==
In the 1968 NFL/AFL draft the Oakland Raiders made Dickey the first African American quarterback to be drafted in the first round in professional football. The Raiders also selected University of Alabama quarterback Ken Stabler in the second round. Despite reports that Dickey outperformed Stabler at training camp, Dickey was moved to wide receiver for the start of the season. It is unknown if this decision was influenced by the predominant stereotype at the time that Blacks weren't intelligent enough to be capable leaders or if it was solely based on Dickey's athletic ability. This came as a blow to a player who at one time told his former coach, Joe Gilliam Sr., that if he couldn't play quarterback he didn't want to play. But, Dickey accepted the position hoping for an opportunity to play his preferred position.

It is believed that this change affected Dickey's performance on the field. He made just one catch for 34 yards and 6 punt returns for 48 yards in 11 games in the 1968 season. He didn't play in another game until 1971 where he made 4 catches for 78 yards with 1 touchdown and on November 5, 1971, was cut from the team 7 games into the season after dropping a pass against the Kansas City Chiefs that could have been a touchdown. He was acquired by the Baltimore Colts from the Raiders for a 1972 third-round pick (74th overall–traded to New Orleans Saints) on January 28, 1972. He did not play in the 1972 NFL season, nor any subsequent season. In 1984, he signed for the Denver Gold of the United States Football League, but never played for the team.

Dickey never overcame the hurt at not being able to play quarterback professionally. As with two other black quarterbacks of his time, Joe Gilliam and Marlin Briscoe, the feeling that he never received a fair opportunity to play his desired position led to drug abuse. In 2005, he was honored as the quarterback of the All-Time HBCU football team.

== Personal life ==
Dickey married LaCanas Casselle in 1966. Later in life he became a minister. He died May 22, 2000, of a stroke. His son Troy played WR for the Arizona Wildcats in the 1990s and had a brief professional career.
