= 1966 Prairie View A&M Panthers football team =

American college football season

1966 Prairie View A&M Panthers football
- Conference: Southwestern Athletic Conference
- Record: 5–3–1 (3–3–1 SWAC)
- Head coach: Hoover J. Wright (1st season)
- Home stadium: Edward L. Blackshear Field

1966 Southwestern Athletic Conference football standings
	Conf.					Overall
Team	W		L		T	W		L		T
Southern +	5	–	1	–	1	7	–	2	–	1
No. 13 Grambling +	5	–	1	–	1	6	–	2	–	1
Texas Southern	4	–	2	–	1	5	–	4	–	1
Jackson State	3	–	3	–	1	5	–	3	–	1
Prairie View A&M	3	–	3	–	1	5	–	3	–	1
Alcorn A&M	2	–	3	–	2	5	–	3	–	2
Arkansas AM&N	2	–	4	–	1	4	–	5	–	1
Wiley	0	–	7	–	0	0	–	8	–	0
+ – Conference co-champions; Rankings from NAIA poll

The 1966 Prairie View A&M Panthers football team represented Prairie View A&M College of Texas (now known as Prairie View A&M University) as a member of the Southwestern Athletic Conference (SWAC) during the 1966 NCAA College Division football season. Led by first-year head coach Hoover J. Wright, the Panthers compiled an overall record of 5–3–1, with a conference record of 3–3–1, and finished tied for fourth in the SWAC.

== Schedule ==
Date	Opponent	Site	Result	Attendance	Source
September 17	at Jackson State	Alumni Field; Jackson, MS	L 7–14	5,321	
September 24	at Southern	University Stadium; Baton Rouge, LA	L 0–35	10,173	
October 1	Grambling	Edward L. Blackshear Field; Prairie View, TX	T 10–10	6,000	
October 17	vs. Wiley	Cotton Bowl; Dallas, TX (State Fair Classic)	W 21–0	1,000	
October 22	Arkansas AM&N	Edward L. Blackshear Field; Prairie View, TX	W 31–0	4,000	
October 29	Mississippi Valley State*	Edward L. Blackshear Field; Prairie View, TX	W 17–8	3,000	
November 5	at Bishop*	Dallas, TX	W 30–16	3,000	
November 12	Alcorn A&M^{†}	Edward L. Blackshear Field; Prairie View, TX	L 10–19	2,100–10,000	
November 19	at Texas Southern	Jeppesen Stadium; Houston, TX (rivalry)	W 31–18	16,500	
*Non-conference game; ^{†}Homecoming
