= 1966 Southern Jaguars football team =

American college football season

1966 Southern Jaguars football

SWAC co-champion
- Conference: Southwestern Athletic Conference
- Record: 7–2–1 (5–1–1 SWAC)
- Head coach: Robert E. Smith (2nd season)
- Home stadium: University Stadium

1966 Southwestern Athletic Conference football standings
	Conf.					Overall
Team	W		L		T	W		L		T
Southern +	5	–	1	–	1	7	–	2	–	1
No. 13 Grambling +	5	–	1	–	1	6	–	2	–	1
Texas Southern	4	–	2	–	1	5	–	4	–	1
Jackson State	3	–	3	–	1	5	–	3	–	1
Prairie View A&M	3	–	3	–	1	5	–	3	–	1
Alcorn A&M	2	–	3	–	2	5	–	3	–	2
Arkansas AM&N	2	–	4	–	1	4	–	5	–	1
Wiley	0	–	7	–	0	0	–	8	–	0
+ – Conference co-champions; Rankings from NAIA poll

The 1966 Southern Jaguars football team was an American football team that represented Southern University as a member of the Southwestern Athletic Conference (SWAC) during the 1966 NCAA College Division football season. Led by Robert E. Smith in his second season as head coach, the Jaguars compiled an overall record of 7–2–1, with a mark of 5–1–1 in conference play, sharing the SWAC title with Grambling.

== Schedule ==
Date	Opponent	Site	Result	Attendance	Source
September 17	at Texas Southern	Jeppesen Stadium; Houston, TX	L 14–20		
September 24	Prairie View A&M	University Stadium; Baton Rouge, LA	W 35–0	10,173	
October 1	at Morris Brown*	Herndon Stadium; Atlanta, GA	W 28–10		
October 8	at Arkansas AM&N	Pumphrey Stadium; Pine Bluff, AR	W 28–14		
October 15	Jackson State	University Stadium; Baton Rouge, LA (rivalry)	W 45–28	6,758–10,219	
October 22	at Alcorn A&M	Henderson Stadium; Lorman, MS	T 14–14	5,200	
October 29	at No. 6 Tennessee A&I*	Hale Stadium; Nashville, TN	L 9–31		
November 5	Wiley^{†}	University Stadium; Baton Rouge, LA	W 27–0	11,528	
November 12	Florida A&M*	University Stadium; Baton Rouge, LA	W 17–13		
November 19	at Grambling	University Stadium; Baton Rouge, LA (rivalry)	W 41–13		
*Non-conference game; ^{†}Homecoming; Rankings from AP Poll released prior to the game
