= 1966 Jackson State Tigers football team =

American college football season

1966 Jackson State Tigers football
- Conference: Southwestern Athletic Conference
- Record: 5–3–1 (3–3–1 SWAC)
- Head coach: Rod Paige (3rd season)
- Home stadium: Alumni Field

1966 Southwestern Athletic Conference football standings
	Conf.					Overall
Team	W		L		T	W		L		T
Southern +	5	–	1	–	1	7	–	2	–	1
No. 13 Grambling +	5	–	1	–	1	6	–	2	–	1
Texas Southern	4	–	2	–	1	5	–	4	–	1
Jackson State	3	–	3	–	1	5	–	3	–	1
Prairie View A&M	3	–	3	–	1	5	–	3	–	1
Alcorn A&M	2	–	3	–	2	5	–	3	–	2
Arkansas AM&N	2	–	4	–	1	4	–	5	–	1
Wiley	0	–	7	–	0	0	–	8	–	0
+ – Conference co-champions; Rankings from NAIA poll

The 1966 Jackson State Tigers football team represented Jackson College for Negro Teachers (now known as Jackson State University) as a member of the Southwestern Athletic Conference (SWAC) during the 1967 NCAA College Division football season. Led by third-year head coach Rod Paige, the Tigers compiled an overall record of 5–3–1, with a conference record of 3–3–1, and finished tied for fifth in the SWAC.

== Schedule ==
Date	Opponent	Site	Result	Attendance	Source
September 17	Prairie View A&M	Alumni Field; Jackson, MS	W 14–7	5,321	
September 24	at Alcorn A&M	Henderson Stadium; Lorman, MS (rivalry)	T 25–25	4,500–7,821	
October 1	Arkansas AM&N	Alumni Field; Jackson, MS	W 28–25	5,001	
October 8	at Alabama State*	Hornet Stadium; Montgomery, AL	W 56–13	4,837	
October 15	at Southern	University Stadium; Baton Rouge, LA (rivalry)	L 28–45	6,758–10,219	
October 22	at Grambling	Grambling Stadium; Grambling, LA	L 18–27	10,026	
October 29	Wiley	Alumni Field; Jackson, MS	W 28–14	5,438	
November 5	Texas Southern	Alumni Field; Jackson, MS	L 14–28	3,832	
November 19	Mississippi Valley State*	Alumni Field; Jackson, MS	W 29–12	4,128	
*Non-conference game
