= 1966 Wiley Wildcats football team =

American college football season

1966 Wiley Wildcats football
- Conference: Southwestern Athletic Conference
- Record: 0–8 (0–7 SWAC)
- Head coach: Bob Moorman (1st season)
- Home stadium: Wiley Field

1966 Southwestern Athletic Conference football standings
	Conf.					Overall
Team	W		L		T	W		L		T
Southern +	5	–	1	–	1	7	–	2	–	1
No. 13 Grambling +	5	–	1	–	1	6	–	2	–	1
Texas Southern	4	–	2	–	1	5	–	4	–	1
Jackson State	3	–	3	–	1	5	–	3	–	1
Prairie View A&M	3	–	3	–	1	5	–	3	–	1
Alcorn A&M	2	–	3	–	2	5	–	3	–	2
Arkansas AM&N	2	–	4	–	1	4	–	5	–	1
Wiley	0	–	7	–	0	0	–	8	–	0
+ – Conference co-champions; Rankings from NAIA poll

The 1966 Wiley Wildcats football team represented Wiley College as a member of the Southwestern Athletic Conference (SWAC) during the 1966 NCAA College Division football season. Led by first-year head coach Bob Moorman, the Wildcats compiled an overall record of 0–8, with a conference record of 0–7, and finished eighth in the SWAC.

== Schedule ==
Date	Opponent	Site	Result	Attendance	Source
September 24	vs. Texas Southern	Public School Stadium; Galveston, TX	L 6–64		
October 1	at Bishop*	Bishop Stadium; Dallas, TX	L 13–14		
October 8	Alcorn A&M	Wiley Field; Marshall, TX	L 2–21	750	
October 17	vs. Prairie View A&M	Cotton Bowl; Dallas, TX (State Fair Classic)	L 0–21	1,000	
October 29	at Jackson State	Alumni Field; Jackson, MS	L 14–28	5,438	
November 5	at Southern	University Stadium; Baton Rouge, LA	L 0–27	11,528	
November 12	Grambling	Wiley Field; Marshall, TX	L 14–45		
November 19	Arkansas AM&N	Wiley Field; Marshall, TX	L 18–54		
*Non-conference game
