= 1966 Grambling Tigers football team =

American college football season

1966 Grambling Tigers football

SWAC co-champion
- Conference: Southwestern Athletic Conference
- Record: 6–2–1 (5–1–1 SWAC)
- Head coach: Eddie Robinson (24th season)
- Home stadium: Grambling Stadium

1966 Southwestern Athletic Conference football standings
	Conf.					Overall
Team	W		L		T	W		L		T
Southern +	5	–	1	–	1	7	–	2	–	1
No. 13 Grambling +	5	–	1	–	1	6	–	2	–	1
Texas Southern	4	–	2	–	1	5	–	4	–	1
Jackson State	3	–	3	–	1	5	–	3	–	1
Prairie View A&M	3	–	3	–	1	5	–	3	–	1
Alcorn A&M	2	–	3	–	2	5	–	3	–	2
Arkansas AM&N	2	–	4	–	1	4	–	5	–	1
Wiley	0	–	7	–	0	0	–	8	–	0
+ – Conference co-champions; Rankings from NAIA poll

The 1966 Grambling Tigers football team represented Grambling College (now known as Grambling State University) as a member of the Southwestern Athletic Conference (SWAC) during the 1966 NCAA College Division football season. Led by 24th-year head coach Eddie Robinson, the Tigers compiled an overall record of 6–2–1 and a mark of 5–1–1 in conference play, sharing the SWAC title with Southern.

== Schedule ==
Date	Opponent	Site	Result	Attendance	Source
September 17	Alcorn A&M	Grambling Stadium; Grambling, LA	W 14–13	750	
October 1	at Prairie View A&M	Edward L. Blackshear Field; Prairie View, TX (rivalry)	T 10–10		
October 8	No. 10 Tennessee A&I*	Grambling Stadium; Grambling, LA	L 23–31		
October 15	at Mississippi Valley State*	Magnolia Stadium; Itta Bena, MS	W 55–33		
October 22	Jackson State	Grambling Stadium; Grambling, LA	W 27–18		
October 29	at Texas Southern	Jeppesen Stadium; Houston, TX	W 19–17		
November 5	Arkansas AM&N	Grambling Stadium; Grambling, LA	W 61–21		
November 12	at Wiley	Wildcat Stadium; Marshall, TX	W 45–14		
November 19	at Southern	University Stadium; Baton Rouge, LA (rivalry)	L 13–41		
*Non-conference game; Rankings from AP Poll released prior to the game
