= 1966 Arkansas AM&N Golden Lions football team =

American college football season

1966 Arkansas AM&N Golden Lions football
- Conference: Southwestern Athletic Conference
- Record: 4–5–1 (2–4–1 SWAC)
- Head coach: Vannette W. Johnson (5th season)
- Home stadium: Pumphrey Stadium

1966 Southwestern Athletic Conference football standings
	Conf.					Overall
Team	W		L		T	W		L		T
Southern +	5	–	1	–	1	7	–	2	–	1
No. 13 Grambling +	5	–	1	–	1	6	–	2	–	1
Texas Southern	4	–	2	–	1	5	–	4	–	1
Jackson State	3	–	3	–	1	5	–	3	–	1
Prairie View A&M	3	–	3	–	1	5	–	3	–	1
Alcorn A&M	2	–	3	–	2	5	–	3	–	2
Arkansas AM&N	2	–	4	–	1	4	–	5	–	1
Wiley	0	–	7	–	0	0	–	8	–	0
+ – Conference co-champions; Rankings from NAIA poll

The 1966 Arkansas AM&N Golden Lions football team represented the Arkansas Agricultural, Mechanical and Normal College (now known as the University of Arkansas at Pine Bluff) as a member of the Southwestern Athletic Conference (SWAC) during the 1966 NCAA College Division football season. Led by fifth-year head coach Vannette W. Johnson, the Golden Lions compiled an overall record of 4–5–1, with a conference record of 2–4–1, and finished seventh in the SWAC.

== Schedule ==
Date	Opponent	Site	Result	Attendance	Source
September 17	Mississippi Valley State*	Pumphrey Stadium; Pine Bluff, AR	W 59–20		
September 24	at Lincoln (MO)*	LU Stadium; Jefferson City, MO	L 21–26		
October 1	at Jackson State	Alumni Field; Jackson, MS	L 25–28	5,001	
October 8	Southern	Pumphrey Stadium; Pine Bluff, AR	L 14–28		
October 15	Bishop*	Pumphrey Stadium; Pine Bluff, AR	W 36–14		
October 22	at Prairie View A&M	Edward L. Blackshear Field; Prairie View, TX	L 0–31		
October 29	Alcorn A&M	Pumphrey Stadium; Pine Bluff, AR	W 34–28		
November 5	at Grambling	Grambling Stadium; Grambling, LA	L 21–61		
November 12	Texas Southern	Pumphrey Stadium; Pine Bluff, AR	T 15–15		
November 19	Wiley	Wiley Field; Marshall, TX	W 54–18		
*Non-conference game
