= 1966 Alcorn A&M Braves football team =

American college football season

1966 Alcorn A&M Braves football
- Conference: Southwestern Athletic Conference
- Record: 5–3–2 (2–3–2 SWAC)
- Head coach: Marino Casem (3rd season)
- Home stadium: Henderson Stadium

1966 Southwestern Athletic Conference football standings
	Conf.					Overall
Team	W		L		T	W		L		T
Southern +	5	–	1	–	1	7	–	2	–	1
No. 13 Grambling +	5	–	1	–	1	6	–	2	–	1
Texas Southern	4	–	2	–	1	5	–	4	–	1
Jackson State	3	–	3	–	1	5	–	3	–	1
Prairie View A&M	3	–	3	–	1	5	–	3	–	1
Alcorn A&M	2	–	3	–	2	5	–	3	–	2
Arkansas AM&N	2	–	4	–	1	4	–	5	–	1
Wiley	0	–	7	–	0	0	–	8	–	0
+ – Conference co-champions; Rankings from NAIA poll

The 1966 Alcorn A&M Braves football team represented Alcorn A&M College (now known as Alcorn State University) as a member of the Southwestern Athletic Conference (SWAC) during the 1966 NCAA College Division football season. Led by third-year head coach Marino Casem, the Braves compiled an overall record of 5–3–2, with a conference record of 2–3–2, and finished sixth in the SWAC.

== Schedule ==
Date	Opponent	Site	Result	Attendance	Source
September 11	Paul Quinn*	Henderson Stadium; Lorman, MS	W 70–0	500	
September 17	at Grambling	Grambling Stadium; Grambling, LA	L 13–14	750	
September 24	Jackson State	Henderson Stadium; Lorman, MS (rivalry)	T 25–25	4,500–7,821	
October 8	at Wiley	Wiley Field; Marshall, TX	W 21–2	750	
October 15	Texas Southern	Henderson Stadium; Lorman, MS	L 7–16	3,500	
October 22	Southern	Henderson Stadium; Lorman, MS	T 14–14	5,200	
October 29	at Arkansas AM&N	Pumphrey Stadium; Pine Bluff, AR	L 28–34	2,700	
November 5	at Mississippi Valley State*	Magnolia Stadium; Itta Bena, MS	W 34–19	2,100	
November 12	at Prairie View A&M	Edward L. Blackshear Field; Prairie View, TX	W 19–10	2,100–10,000	
November 19	Bishop*	Henderson Stadium; Lorman, MS	W 52–18	3,900	
*Non-conference game
